= Parker-Hale M82 =

Sniper rifle

Parker Hale M82
- Type: Sniper rifle
- Place of origin: United Kingdom

Service history
- In service: 1972–Present
- Used by: See Use
- Wars: War in Afghanistan

Production history
- Designed: 1960s
- Manufacturer: Parker Hale
- Variants: See Variants

Specifications (Canada C3A1)
- Mass: 7.2 kg (15.9 lbs)
- Length: 127–132.1cm
- Barrel length: 711.2 mm (28 in)
- Cartridge: 7.62×51mm NATO
- Action: M98 Bolt action
- Muzzle velocity: 786.3 m/s-835.1 m/s (2580 ft/s-2740 ft/s)(175 grain – 147 grain)
- Effective firing range: 1200m
- Maximum firing range: 600m
- Feed system: 4-round internal magazine
- Sights: block mounts for iron sights

The Parker-Hale Model 82 (M82) is the military version of the Parker-Hale 1200TX target rifle; it was accepted for service by several nations for both military and police use. In appearance and design terms the Model 82 is an entirely conventional sniping weapon. It uses a manual bolt action the same as the classic Mauser 98 rifle, allied to a heavy free-floating barrel chambered for the 7.62×51mm NATO round. The barrel weighs 1.98 kg and is manufactured from chrome molybdenum steel. The Model 82 has an integral four-round magazine and an entirely self-contained trigger unit which can be adjusted as required.

== Design ==
The M82 was available in a number of forms to suit any customer requirements. Thus an adjustable cheek pad may have been provided if wanted, and the butt lengths can be altered by adding or taking away butt spacers of various thicknesses. The rifle was basically a standard target 7.62×51mm NATO heavy-barreled Mauser 98 with a wide beaver tail target walnut stock (with inset handstop rail) and a Parker Hale trigger with its side safety mechanism. The sights were subject to several variations, but the standard Model 82 was normally supplied with removable 'iron' match-type sight blocks. If an optical sight is fitted the rear-sight was removed, and the front sight slid off, but the front block/post remained. Two mounting blocks were fitted to the receiver for the purpose of the fitting of optical sight mounts, supplied with the Parker Hale are the parkerized aluminium scope rings; rifles that were in service in the Australian and New Zealand armies used the Austrian Kahles Wien ZF-69 6×42 (26mm tube) drop compensation telescopic sight set in 100m increments out to 800m, with fine crosshair. Some attempts at refurbishing and rebarrelling the rifles resulted in usage of one piece scope mounts but this proved unsatisfactory. The action and barrel were originally finished by parkerizing then completed with a black rubberised style non-reflecting coating.

The barrel for the Canadian C3A1 is a heavy, fully free floating barrel chambered for the 7.62×51mm NATO round. It has a weight of 2.04 kg/4.5 lbs and a length of 60 cm. Rifling follows a 1:12 turn ratio with 4 right hand twists. The action is a Mauser-style rotating bolt type. It has 3 stainless steel locking lugs at the front and rear of the bolt. The C3 safety is a thumb activated lever above the magazine which locks the trigger, bolt and sear giving ultimate protection against an accidental discharge.

The standard sight on the revamped model C3A1 is an Unertl 10× zoom scope which can only be used for daytime engagements as its lacks any night vision capabilities. It has a duplex crosshair with a mil dot style scale in increments of 200m up to 1000m. It can also be used with the default iron sights. The stock for the C3A1 is one piece walnut or fibreglass stock with an internal bedding of either Devlon, Aluminum or Steel putty. The fibreglass version is called the Mcmillan A2 stock and can be painted in any camouflage scheme depending on environment.

== Variants ==
=== L81A1 ===
The Parker Hale L81A1 is a shorter version of the Parker Hale M82 rifle 7.62×51mm (.308) rifle, adopted as a cadet rifle in addition to the .22 LR Rifle No.8. It can trace its lineage back through both the M82 sniper rifle and the Parker-Hale 1200TX target rifle.

=== L81A2 ===
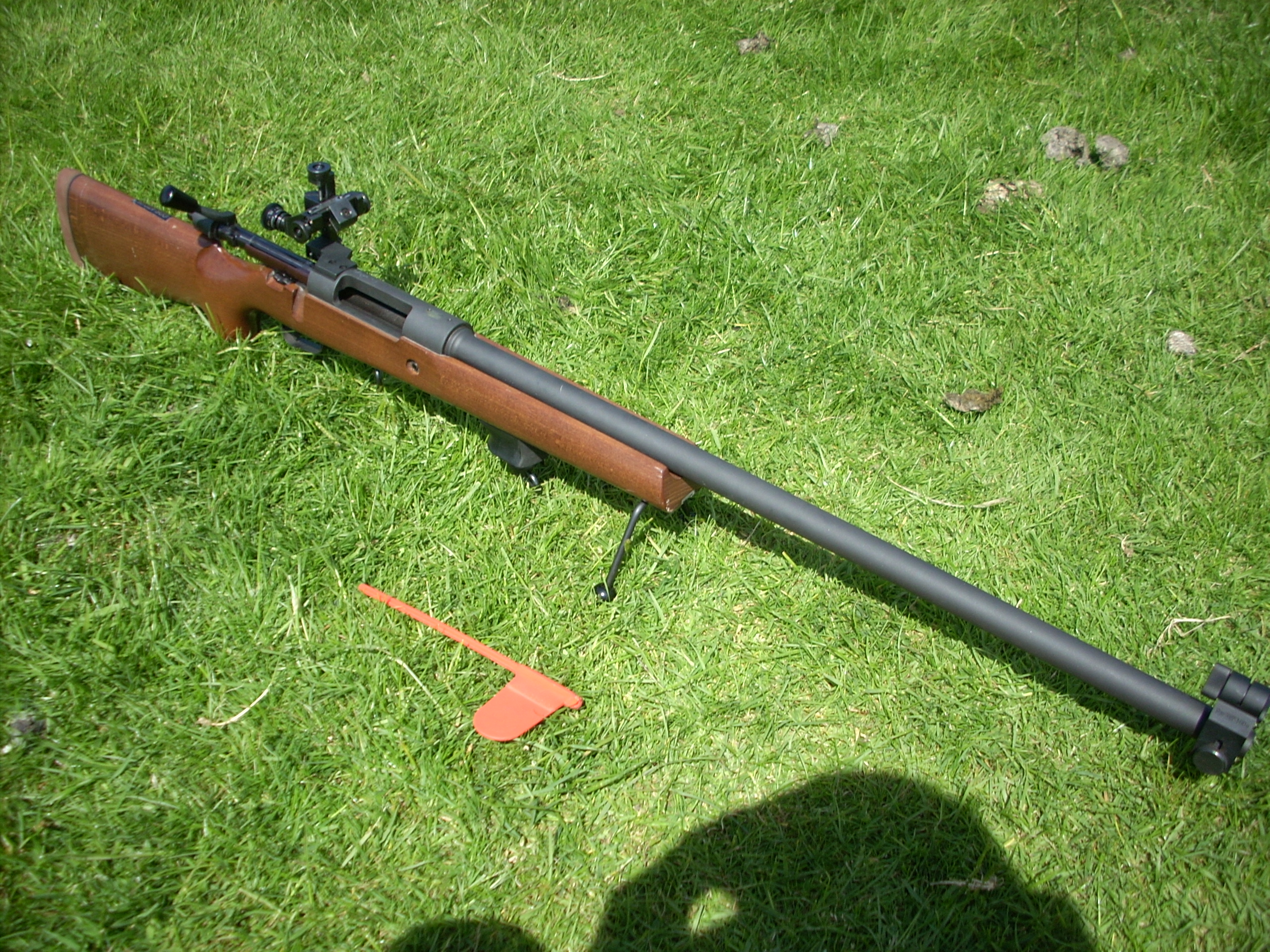
L81 A2 Cadet Target Rifle

The Parker Hale L81A2, officially known as the L81A2 Cadet Target Rifle (CTR), the L81A2 replaced the L81A1 following reports of technical safety issues, including bulges in the barrel and is used by the ATC, ACF, SCC and CCF in competitions such as the Ashburton Shield staged annually in July by the Council for Cadet Rifle Shooting (CCRS), and the Inter Service Cadet Rifle Meeting (ISCRM), held at Bisley ranges. It is to be withdrawn without replacement in 2026

=== C3 ===
The C3 was adopted by the Canadians in 1972 and was based on the Parker Hale M82. Its stock was made of wood with a front beavertail and an accessories rail. It had a Kahles Helios ZF 69 6×42 scope. After a couple of years, it was upgraded to the C3A1 with a few modifications.

=== C3A1 ===
The C3 was updated to the C3A1 and a number of modifications were made including the addition of a 10× Unertl scope currently in use by the United States Marine Corps. A fiberglass McMillan A2 stock was fitted along with a Parker-Hale made bipod for more stability and support while aiming in the prone position. During Operation APOLLO Canadian sniper Master Corporal Graham Ragsdale recorded 20 confirmed kills with the C3A1. It has also been used as a competition rifle. The C3A1 has been withdrawn from the Canadian Army and has been replaced by the C14 Timberwolf rifle Medium Range Sniper Weapon System. Instead it is used for the training of snipers due to its similarities with the C14 Timberwolf rifle. Its decline was due to a lack of parts due to the ending of production of firearms by Parker Hale in 2000 and the cessation of C3A1 production in 1984.

Parker Hale offered the C3A1 as a complete kit known as the M85 on the civilian market. Common confusion occurs but no M82 was fitted with detachable magazines or enlarged bolt knob. Other Canadian snipers recorded high hit ratios and some extremely difficult shots. These marksmen remain anonymous.

== Users ==
- Australia – Australian Army now uses SR-25, SR98, Blaser R93 Tactical
- Canada (replaced by the C21 for the Canadian Army)
- New Zealand – New Zealand Army now uses L96, LMT 308 MWS Accuracy International AW50 Barrett MRAD and Barrett 107a1
- United Kingdom – replaced by the Accuracy International Arctic Warfare L118A1 and Accuracy International AWM L115A3 by British Army

== See also ==
- C14 Timberwolf rifle

Similar sniper rifles

- FR F1
- L42A1
- M40A1
