= Accuracy International AX50 =

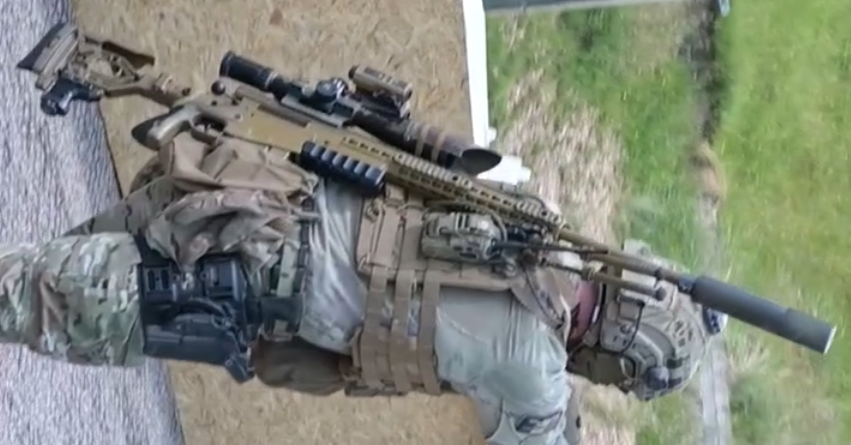
- Accuracy International AX50 with a suppressor
- Type: Anti-material rifle
- Place of origin: United Kingdom

Service history
- Used by: See Users

Production history
- Manufacturer: Accuracy International
- Produced: 2010–present

Specifications
- Mass: 12.5 kg (27.6 lb) (with empty magazine)
- Length: 1,370 mm (53.9 in); 1,115 mm (43.9 in) folded
- Barrel length: 685.8 mm (27.0 in)
- Width: 125 mm (4.92 in); 164 mm folded
- Height: 190 mm (7.48 in)
- Cartridge: .50 BMG
- Action: Bolt-action; Two-stage trigger, set at 1.5 to 2.0kg (3.3-4.4 1bs)
- Muzzle velocity: 900 m/s (2,953 ft/s)
- Effective firing range: 2,500 m (2,734 yd)
- Feed system: 5-round detachable box magazine
- Sights: Standard: S&B 5-25×56 PM II telescopic sight

The Accuracy International AX50 is a .50 BMG anti-materiel rifle manufactured by British firearms company Accuracy International.

The AX50 is developed as an upgrade to the Accuracy International AW50, the AX50 is built to withstand sustained, heavy usage and constant military deployment. It was designed to allow the operator a high level of accuracy and performance in harsh conditions.

== History ==
The AX50 is a .50 BMG anti-materiel rifle variant of the AXMC sniper rifle that entered production in 2010. Designed by Accuracy International to meet the modern demands of military and police units alike, the AX50 Is designed with long range precision accuracy in mind for a more accurate anti-materiel weapon.

According to Accuracy International, the development of the series was partly influenced by the Precision Sniper Rifle (PSR) U.S. Special Operations Command solicitation, an undertaking by the U.S. military for a new and improved Precision long range rifle. The PSR contract was ultimately granted to Remington's Modular Sniper Rifle.

== Design details ==
The AX50 is a bolt-action, .50 BMG anti-materiel rifle weighing 12.5 kg (27.6 lb), and is 1,370 mm (53.9 in) in overall length with a 685.8 mm (27.0 in) free floated barrel that can be changed in less than 10 minutes. It is built on an aluminum chassis, has a stock which can be folded to the left to shorten the overall length of the rifle when needed, and features a two-stage trigger with a 3.3 to 4.4 lbs. adjustable pull. The receiver and bolt featuring a 60° bolt throw are made of steel.

The AX50 features an integrated Picatinny rail, a 30 mm (1.18 in) diameter bolt and a "Firing pin cocking indicator" safety allowing the user to ascertain whether a cartridge is chambered. Accuracy International actively promotes fitting the Schmidt & Bender PM II / MILITARY MK II product line as sighting components on their sniper rifles and sells these telescopic sights as accessories, which is rare for a rifle manufacturer.

== Variants ==
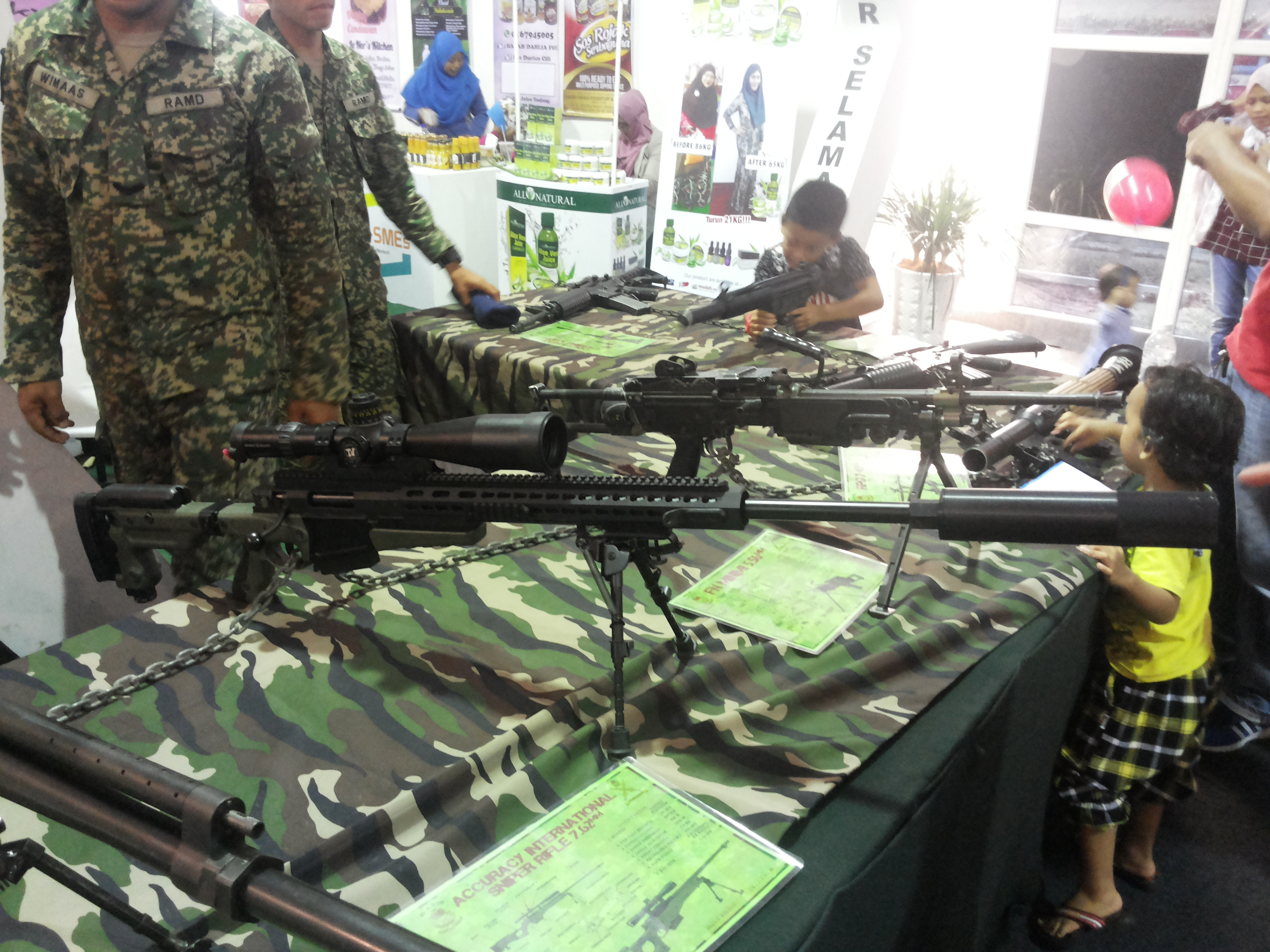
AX308 variant on display

- AXMC multi calibre sniper rifle that can be chambered either in .338 Lapua Magnum, 300 Winchester Magnum or 7.62×51mm NATO/.308 Winchester when it is reconfigured by changing the 22 mm (0.87 in) diameter bolt, magazine/insert, and barrel.
- AX308 non-multi calibre sniper rifle chambered in 7.62×51mm NATO/.308 Winchester using a 20 mm (0.79 in) diameter bolt.

== Users ==
- Cyprus: AX-50 used by the Cypriot Special Forces.
- Denmark: the standard anti-materiel precision rifle for the Royal Danish Army.
- Turkey: In service with Turkish Police Special Operation Department.
- United Kingdom: It has replaced the AW50.
- Netherlands: Used in multiple divisions.

== See also ==
- List of sniper rifles
