= Parker-Hale M85 =

Parker Hale M85
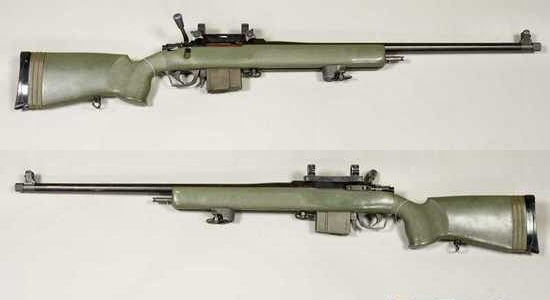
- Parker Hale M85 sniper rifle with scope mounts but no rifle scope
- Place of origin: United Kingdom

Production history
- Manufacturer: Parker Hale
- Variants: Parker Hale M85 Police

Specifications
- Mass: 12.57 lbs. (with scope)
- Length: 45.3" (overall)
- Barrel length: 24.5"
- Cartridge: 7.62×51mm NATO
- Effective firing range: 900 metres
- Maximum firing range: 1,200 meters
- Feed system: 10-round magazine
- Sights: Iron sights. Can be fitted with any scope.

The Parker Hale M85 is a British bolt-action .308 sniper rifle, with an effective range around 900 metres. It fires from a 10-round detachable magazine, and weighs 12 pounds, telescopic sight included. The rifle was created after the Falklands War by Parker Hale Ltd in response to shortcomings in the contemporary Lee–Enfield L42A1. Although the Parker Hale M85 manufacturing licence was sold to Gibbs Rifle Co., it has not yet resumed production.

== History ==
The M85 took part in a British Army trial to see if it could be used as a potential sniper rifle, along with the Accuracy International PM, Heckler & Koch PSG1, SIG Sauer SSG 2000, and Remington 700. The rifle lost by a slight margin to the Accuracy International (adopted by the British Army as the L96).

== Design ==
The M85's range is about 600 metres and has an 85% first round hit capabilities from 600 – 900 metres. The weapon also has a silent safety catch, a threaded muzzle for a flash suppressor, and an integral dovetail rail that accepts a variety of sights. The standard telescopic sight is a 6×42mm Schmidt & Bender with a BDC from 200 – 900 meters. Emergency iron sights are also fitted. The rifle is outfitted with a bipod as standard. The fiberglass stock is made by McMillan.

=== Variants ===
There is a police variant of the M85, which has a cheek pad option on the rifle's timber stock. This was marketed as the M87 model.

== Users ==
- Brazil: Brazilian Navy (GRUMEC) (Batalhão de Operações Especias de Fuzileiros Navais)
- Malaysia: Royal Malaysian Navy (PASKAL)
- Fiji
