= Eurooptic =

Privately owned business

EuroOptic.com
- Type: Private
- Industry: Retail
- Founded: late 1990s
- Headquarters: Montoursville, Pennsylvania, U.S.
- Products: High-quality optics scopes, binoculars, spotting scopes, and firearms
- Services: Firearms import export and distribution for various brands
- Website: EuroOptic.com

EuroOptic.com is a privately owned business started in the late 1990s that deals primarily in high-quality optics. This business' predominant sales channel is direct e-commerce via the company website, but EuroOptic also maintains a company presence on popular public channel stores including eBay, Amazon, and GunBroker.com. EuroOptic is an ATF Class 08 Firearms importer, a DDTC US Department of State exporter, BIS US Department of Commerce exporter, Accuracy International distributor, exclusive Surgeon Rifle distributor, North American distributor for Cadex Defence, a US Military sales distributor for Bushnell Tactical Optics, a US Military sales distributor for Nightforce Optics, has a GSA contract, and is a Master Distributor for Remington Defense.

== Products and Product Lines ==
EuroOptic maintains over 150 manufacturer relationships but is most well known for its relationships with Accuracy International, Schmidt & Bender, Hensoldt, Swarovski Optik, Sitka Gear, Zeiss, Leica, Nightforce, Blaser, Desert Tech, Sako, and Vortex Optics.

== RED Shipping ==
EuroOptic launched its RED shipping offering in Q3 of 2021. Designed to capitalize on the retailer's extremely large offering of in-stock products, the RED shipping program ships covered items the same day with either a 1-day or 2-day UPS carrier delivery speed, at no extra charge.

== Retail Storefront ==
EuroOptic completed construction of a new retail and headquarters facility in Montoursville, Pennsylvania in August 2017. In 2020, EuroOptic completed the purchase of a 235,000 sq. ft. facility formerly owned by Grizzly Industrial, most of which is in renovation to support the large warehousing and fulfillment operation, but also includes plans for a 30,000 sq. ft. destination showroom, with an estimated completion date in late 2022.

== Wall of Shame ==
EuroOptic was infamous for maintaining a list of customers who attempted or successfully defrauded or broke the trust of the company during its early days. This list often contained the customer's name and address, and occasionally information about which products they had fraudulently obtained. This practice proved to be interesting to the readership of this site and prompted a few bounty hunters to begin working through the list proffered on the Wall of Shame in hopes that they might split some of the profits of collecting the charges for the illegitimately obtained products.

The Wall of Shame was taken down in the late 2010s due to concerns about the reputability of the practice.

== Sponsorships ==
EuroOptic sponsors many shooting, hunting, safari, and conservation efforts, most notably the Dallas Safari Club and Safari Club International, and is a sponsor of most Precision Rifle Series events. It was the 2021 title sponsor of the Sportsman's Channel and YouTube channel MTN TOP OUTDOORS.
