= Bottom metal =

Firearm component

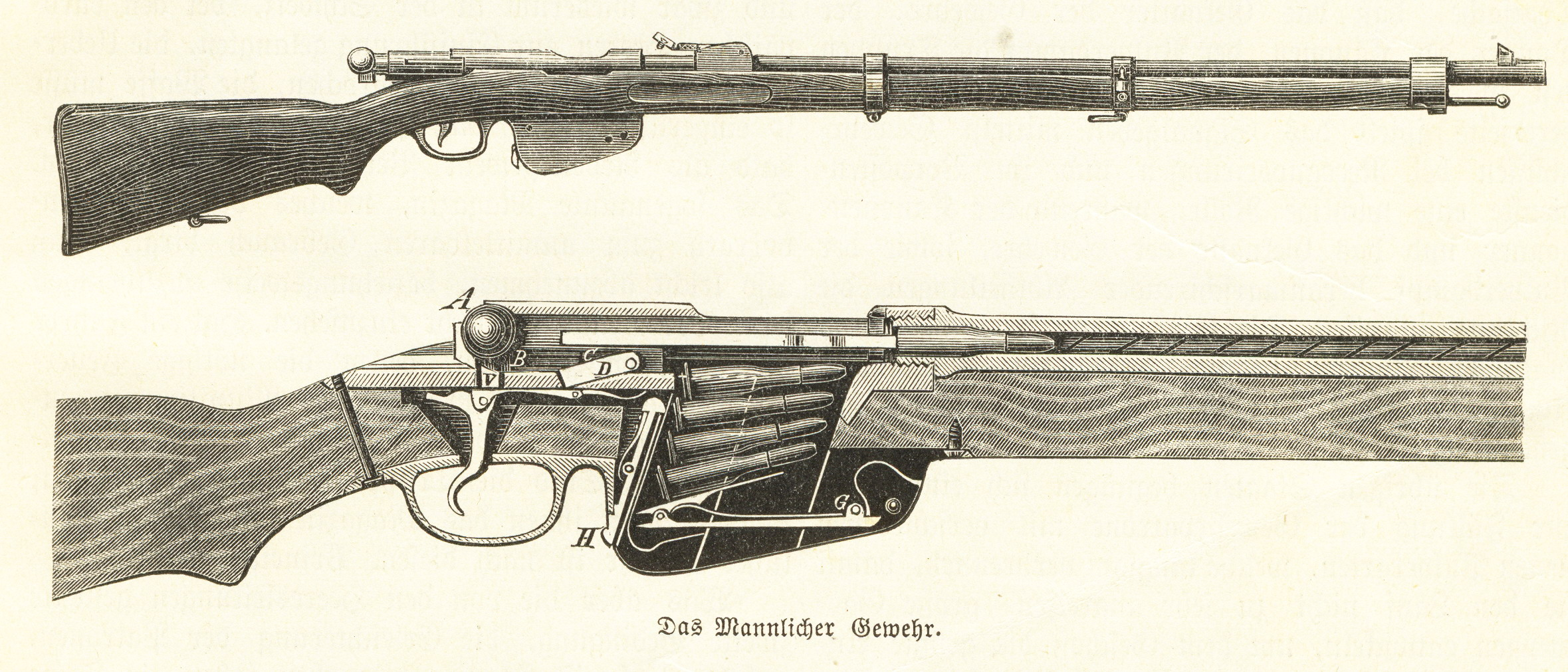
Bottom metal on a Mannlicher M1886 (cutaway).

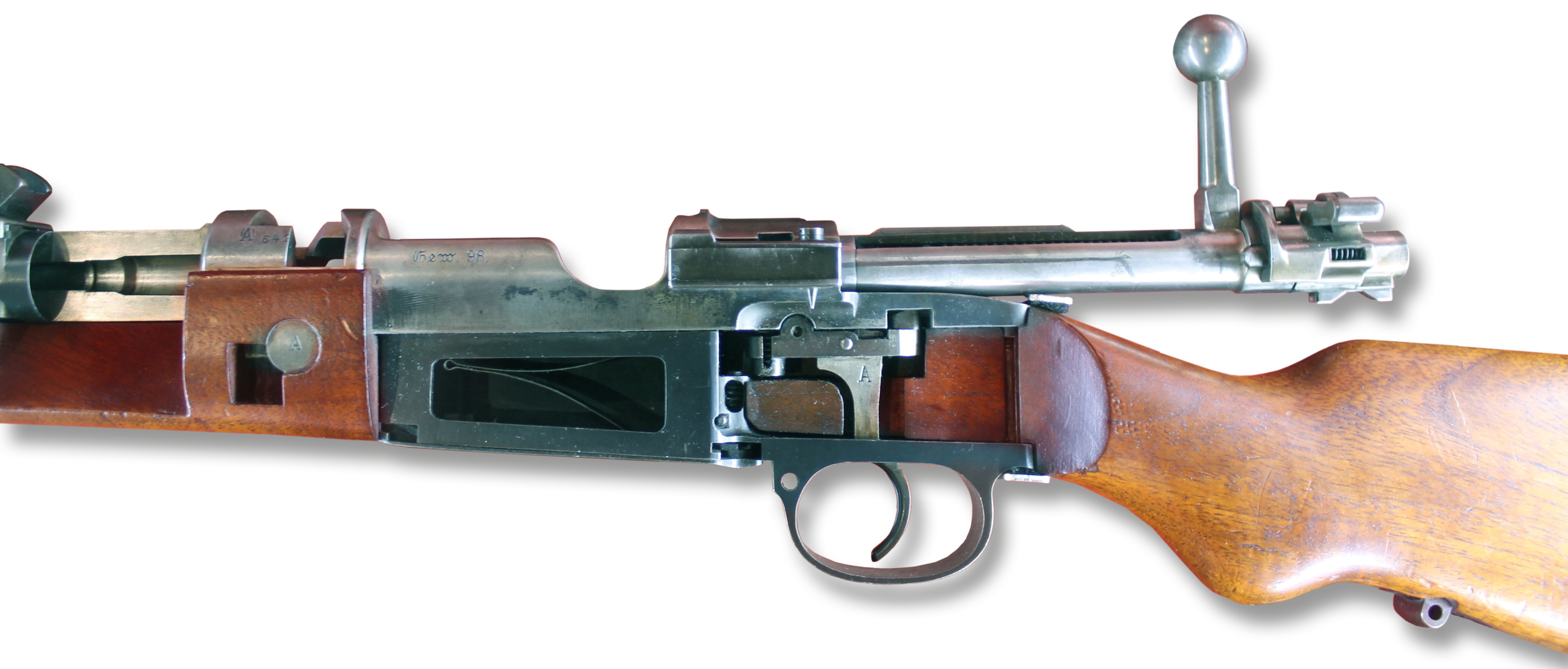
Bottom metal on a Mauser Model 98 (cutaway).

A bottom metal is a firearm component typically made of metallic material (such as aluminium alloy or steel), that serves as the floor of the action and also helps to clamp the receiver onto the stock. The bottom metal also frequently incorporates the trigger guard, for instance on the Mauser 98 and M1 Garand, although a trigger guard by itself is not considered a bottom metal.

In repeating firearms with internal magazines, the bottom metal serves as the magazine floorplate and contains the spring and follower, either as a fixed solid piece or can be opened like a hinged door. Bottom metals designed to accept detachable magazines are called detachable bottom metals (DBM), and contain a rectangular reception slot called the magazine well, with a latch mechanism that securely holds the inserted magazine in place.

Single-shot firearms (e.g. SIG Sauer 200 STR) typically do not have bottom metals, and modern firearms with metallic chassis (e.g. SIG Sauer CROSS) do not have separate bottom metals as its function is already integrated into the chassis.

Aftermarket bottom metals are available commercially for various models of modern firearms. It is not uncommon to see a firearm with an internal magazine (e.g. a Remington 700 rifle) being modified to accept various models of detachable box magazines (e.g. an AICS magazine), simply by replacing the factory bottom metal with an aftermarket one.

== See also ==
- Receiver
