= Accuracy International AW50 =

Accuracy International Arctic Warfare .50
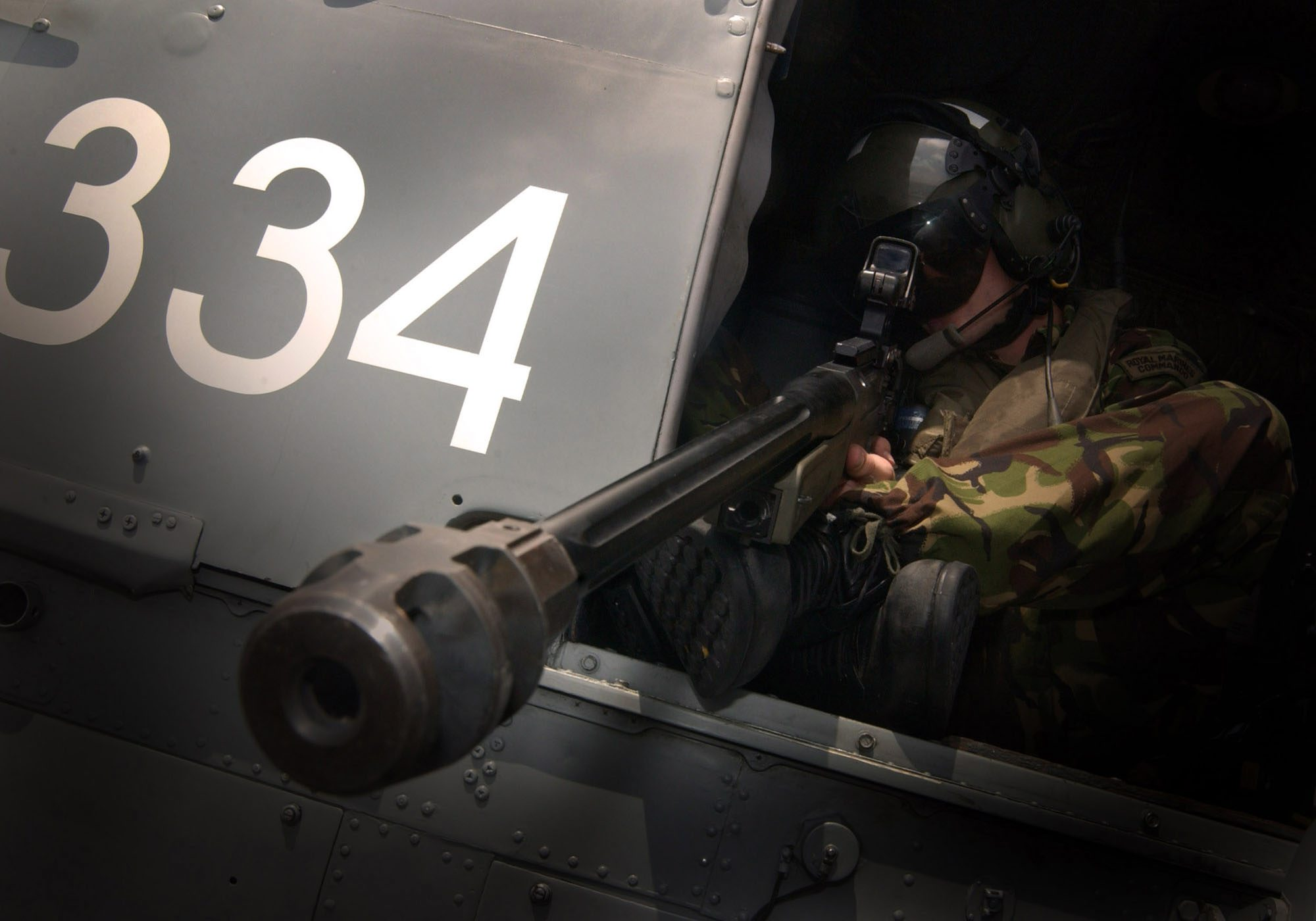
- Royal Marine sniper with the AW50
- Type: Anti-materiel rifle
- Place of origin: United Kingdom

Service history
- In service: 2000-present
- Used by: See Users

Production history
- Manufacturer: Accuracy International

Specifications
- Mass: 15 kg w/ bipod (33 lbs)
- Length: 1,420 mm, 1,170 mm (folded)
- Barrel length: 686 mm (27 inches)
- Cartridge: .50 BMG (12.7×99mm NATO)
- Action: Bolt-action
- Effective firing range: 1,500 m
- Feed system: 5-round box magazine
- Sights: Mil spec Mk II in 6x, 10x and standard iron sights

The AW50 is a .50 BMG anti-materiel rifle designed by Accuracy International. It is a re-engineered version of the Accuracy International Arctic Warfare sniper rifle (the standard issue sniper rifle in the British forces).

== Overview ==
The AW50 is intended to engage a variety of targets, including radar installations, light vehicles (including light armoured vehicles), field fortifications, boats and ammunition dumps. The Picatinny rail can hold a variety of equipment; the normal sight for the AW50 is the Schmidt & Bender 3-12x50 PM II with Al Mil Dot reticle, 0.2 mrad clicks and elevation to 1,500 m (4,900 ft) and laser protection. Night vision device sights such as the Simrad KN series or Hensoldt NSV 80 can also be fitted.

=== AW50F ===
The AW50F is a folding stock variant of the AW50, which fires the multi-purpose Raufoss Mk 211 cartridge and other rounds. It has a fully adjustable bipod and buttstock heel rest. Four sling loops allow shoulder and hand carrying of the rifle. Weighing 15 kg (33 lb), the AW50F rifle is approximately four times the weight of a typical assault rifle. The Raufoss Mk 211 (NM140 MP) .50 calibre ammunition is also heavy. The weight of the weapon, combined with a muzzle brake on the front end and a hydraulic buffer system in the butt, gives the AW50F a relatively low recoil and enhances accuracy. Most of the rifles are made in the United Kingdom. The barrels are sourced from three different manufacturers: Lothar Walther, Border and Maddco.

== Users ==
- Australia: AW50F.
- Germany: Designated G24.
- Indonesia: Used by Indonesian Air Force Bravo Detachment 90.
- Ireland: Used by ARW marksmen.
- Malaysia: Used by Royal Malaysian Navy PASKAL.
- Portugal: AW50 is used by GNR (Republican National Guard).
- Slovakia: AW50F Used by 5th Special Operations Regiment.
- South Korea: Used by UDT/SEAL.
- Thailand: Used by Royal Thai Navy and Royal Thai Navy SEALS.
- United Kingdom L121A1 Used in limited quantities by EOD units, UKSF and Royal Marine Maritime Sniper Teams

== See also ==
- Accuracy International AWP
- Accuracy International AWM
- Accuracy International AS50
- Accuracy International AX50
