= C14 Timberwolf =

PGW Timberwolf C14 MRSWS
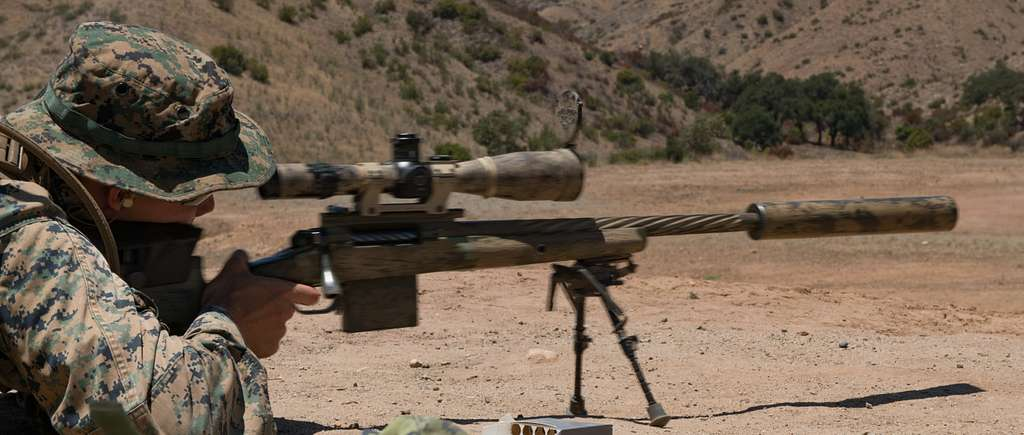
- A United States Marine using the Timberwolf rifle at RIMPAC 2018
- Type: Sniper rifle
- Place of origin: Canada

Service history
- In service: 2005–present
- Used by: See Users
- Wars: War in Afghanistan (2001–2021); Yemeni Civil War (2015–present); Saudi-led intervention in Yemen; Saudi–Yemeni border conflict (2015–present)

Production history
- Designer: PGW Defence Technologies Ltd
- Designed: 2001
- Produced: 2005–present
- No. built: Approx. 5,890

Specifications (PGW Timberwolf)
- Mass: 7.1 kg (15.6 lbs) unloaded
- Length: 1,200 mm (47 in); 1,245 mm (49 in) with muzzle brake
- Barrel length: 660 mm (26 in)
- Cartridge: .338 Lapua Magnum
- Action: manually operated bolt action
- Muzzle velocity: 823 m/s (2,700 ft/s) for 19.44 g (300 gr) SMK
- Effective firing range: 1,500 m
- Feed system: 5 round detachable box
- Sights: day or night optics

The C14 Timberwolf MRSWS (Medium Range Sniper Weapon System) is a bolt-action sniper rifle built by the Canadian arms company PGW Defence Technologies Inc. In 2005 they won the contract to supply the Canadian Forces Land Command with the C14 Timberwolf MRSWS for $4.5 million.

The military version of the rifle, which is being used to replace the C3A1 sniper rifle, started as a civilian precision sport rifle. The military rifle, however, has several modifications to make it better suited for military use, and many accessories are available.

The official military designation for the rifle is C14 Timberwolf Medium Range Sniper Weapon System (MRSWS).

== History ==
The Timberwolf rifle was originally developed as a civilian long range hunting and sport shooting rifle for super magnum cartridges by the Canadian company Prairie Gun Works, now PGW Defence Technologies Inc. The civilian Timberwolf rifle is offered in several chamberings, up to the .408 Cheyenne Tactical cartridge and the .416 PGW cartridge, a wildcat cartridge based on the .408 Cheyenne Tactical. These rifle cartridges are dimensionally larger and are more powerful when compared to the .338 Lapua Magnum cartridge used in the C14 Timberwolf used by the Canadian military.

During the 1990s the Canadian Armed Forces formulated a requirement for a sniper rifle that could fulfill an anti-personnel role up to 1,200 m (1,312 yd). This long-range anti-personnel rifle would replace the aging C3A1 bolt-action rifle which fired the smaller 7.62×51mm NATO cartridge which had been in service since the 1950s.

In 2001 during trials for new sniper rifles at CFB Gagetown, the C14 Timberwolf MRSWS was picked to become the new designated anti-personnel sniper rifle for the Canadian Forces. The C14 Timberwolf MRSWS went into production for the Canadian Forces Land Command in 2005.

Since the introduction of the C14 Timberwolf MRSWS, the C3A1 rifle has been slowly removed from active service. The C14 Timberwolf MRSWS is now the main sniper rifle in the Canadian Armed Forces arsenal. It is highly rated by snipers, who like the rifle itself as well as the additional effective range and penetration the .338 Lapua Magnum offers over the C3A1's 7.62×51mm NATO cartridge.

The C14 Timberwolf's accuracy potential is stated by its manufacturer as sub 0.75 MOA with proper ammunition. The Canadian Forces accuracy standard was evaluated by hit probability with a requirement of hitting a chest sized target at 1,200 m (1,312 yd) 90% of the time. PGW Defence Technologies Inc. averaged over 95% on this standard and every weapon delivered under the Canadian Armed Forces contract was evaluated for accuracy and witnessed by DND officials.

== Design details ==
The C14 Timberwolf MRSWS rifle is chambered for the .338 Lapua Magnum rifle cartridge. The rifle achieves a maximum muzzle velocity of 838 m/s (2750 ft/s) with 19.44 g (300 gr) Sierra Matchking very-low-drag bullet loads. Such loads are much more powerful compared to the 7.62×51mm NATO cartridge used in the C3A1 rifle which typically fires 11.3 g (175 gr) bullets at 790 m/s (2580 ft/s).

=== Operating mechanism ===
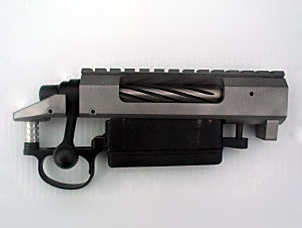
PGWDTI Timberwolf bolt-action

The Timberwolf action is a manually operated stainless steel bolt action with a right-hand side bolt and ejection port. The bolt is a rotary bolt with dual front locking lugs plus one locking lug at the rear. It requires a 90-degree bolt rotation. the bolt is partly helically fluted which reduces weight and stops bolt debris jams. A double plunger ejector and hook type extractor are used to remove fired cartridge cases. This helps create a very smooth action which is very reliable. The extra locking lug at the rear assists in preventing the bolt from becoming jammed when chambering another round. Though not used by the Canadian military, the manufacturer offers a titanium receiver as an alternative for the stainless steel used in the C14 receiver. The use of titanium reduces the weight of the Timberwolf bolt-action.

The single stage trigger is adjustable for weight, creep, and over-travel.

=== Barrel ===
The barrel for the MRSWS is a modified, heavy free floating Krieger made barrel. It comes in 660 mm (26 in) standard but a 737 mm (29 in) custom barrel is fitted to the civilian precision hunting rifle variant, however this can be used on the military version as well. The 338 Lapua Magnum barrels are supplied with a 254 mm (1 in 10 inch) twist rate optimized to stabilize long, heavy very-low-drag bullets like the Sierra HPBT MatchKing and Lapua Scenar .338-calibre 19.44 gram (300 grain) bullets. The barrels are cryogenic stress relieved and partly helically fluted which reduces weight whilst maintaining most of the structural strength and contains a detachable proprietary stainless steel muzzle brake that reduces the recoil.

=== Safety ===
The safety is a three-position type safety featuring a middle "field strip" position.

=== Feeding ===
It has a five-round detachable box magazine which is positioned just ahead of the trigger guard.

=== Sights ===
The rifle has no default iron sights but it is instead fitted with a length of integral picatinny rail with a 25 MOA forward slope on which an optical sight can be mounted. It also contains two small lengths of MIL-STD-1913 or Picatinny rail at the forefront of the stock. The Canadian Forces originally used a Leupold Mark 4 16x40mm LR/T M1 Riflescope and later Schmidt & Bender PMII telescopic sights as standard, but other day telescopic sights and night sights can be fitted. Simrad night sights are mounted by custom scope ring sets and UNS or MUNS night sights are mounted via a PGWDTI proprietary mount. Tactical lights and lasers can be fitted to the two front lengths of MIL-STD-1913 rail.

=== Stock ===
The stock is a McMillan A5 composite stock which has an adjustable saddle cheekpiece and spacer plates to regulate the length of pull to tailor the stock for the individual shooter. It is an upgraded version from the M40A3 McMillan A3 type stock. The stock is made from high strength fibre glass with a PGWDTI-Titanium Cantilever Monoblock bedding block which provides both added comfort and strength.

=== Accessories ===
The gun can accept the customary accessories for sniper weapons systems like; telescopic sights and other optical sights, MIL-STD-1913 rails (Picatinny rails) to mount optical sights and other accessories, bipods, muzzle brakes/flash-hiders and silencers (sound suppressors) and (carrying) slings. Further it can be delivered with cleaning kits and soft and heavy-duty transit cases and various maintenance tools.

== Users ==
- Canada: Used by Canadian Forces.
- United Kingdom: Used by the SAS.
- Saudi Arabia: Used by the Royal Saudi Land Force.
- Ukraine: Used by the Ukrainian Ground Forces and the Ukrainian Marine Corps - delivered by Canadian government in early 2022 during Russian Invasion of Ukraine

== Bibliography ==
- Neville, Leigh (20 December 2016). The SAS 1983-2014. Osprey. ISBN 978-1472814036.
