= No.8 rifle =

Rifle .22" No.8 Mk.1
- Type: Cadet rifle
- Place of origin: United Kingdom

Service history
- In service: late 1940s – 2018
- Used by: United Kingdom British Army as well as cadets ACF CCF SCC ATC

Production history
- Manufacturer: Royal Ordnance Factory Fazakerley & BSA Ltd, Shirley
- Produced: 1947–1953
- Variants: Match (prototypes only), Infantry

Specifications
- Length: 41 in (1.04 m)
- Barrel length: 23.2 in (0.59 m)
- Cartridge: .22 Long Rifle
- Calibre: .22 in (5.6 mm)
- Action: Re-designed Lee bolt, hand fed, single shot
- Muzzle velocity: 330 m/s (1,100 ft/s)
- Effective firing range: 100 yd (91 m)
- Feed system: Single shot – bolt action
- Sights: Blade foresight, aperture rearsight, adjustable for elevation between 25 and 100 yd (23 and 91 m)

The Rifle, Number 8 (commonly referred to as the "Number 8 Rifle" or the "Number 8 Cadet Rifle") is a bolt-action .22 calibre version of the Lee–Enfield rifle designed for British Army target shooting. They are simple single-shot, hand-fed cadet rifles and were originally designed to be used by military marksmen firing in civilian competitions. The Number 8 is no longer used by the British cadet services as a basic target rifle, replaced by the L144 and air rifles. Some examples are in civilian ownership worldwide, especially following the disposal by the New Zealand cadet forces of their Number 8 and Number 9 rifles at auction.

== Sight types ==
Typically fired at a range of 25 yd (23 m), the rearsight can be adjusted to allow fire at 50 and 100 yd (46 and 91 m). A harmonisation setting is also provided for firing at specially designed targets. The No 8 can also be fitted with two types of sight. The more common leaf sight, allowing adjustment for elevation only, is simpler to use and more robust, but the standard of accuracy that can be achieved with this sight is lower than can be achieved with the Parker Hale PH5D sight, which allows for windage adjustment as well as elevation, in 1/4 minute of angle clicks. It is also more delicate than the leaf-sight and not generally found in cadet service. The Parker-Hale 8/53 sight adaptor unit can also be fitted to the leaf rearsight, providing windage adjustment without the removal of the issued sighting system. It screws on through the sight aperture and therefore introduces a large elevation difference, rendering the range markings on the sight useless.

== Replacement ==
In 2014 the replacement contract for the rifle was put out to tender. In 2016 it was announced that a modified version of the Savage Arms FVT had been chosen for this role, entering service as the "L144 A1 Cadet Small Bore Target Rifle (CSBTR)".

== Users ==
United Kingdom

- Army Cadet Force
- Sea Cadet Corps
- Combined Cadet Force
- Air Training Corps
