= SIG Sauer CROSS =

- Type: Hunting rifle
- Place of origin: United States

Production history
- Manufacturer: SIG Sauer
- Unit cost: $1,779 (MSRP)
- Produced: 2019 (announced) to present

Specifications
- Mass: 2.94 kg (6.48 lb) or 3.08 kg (6.79 lb)
- Length: 927 mm (36.5 in) or 977.9 mm (38.5 in)
- Barrel length: 406 mm (16.0 in) or 457 mm (18.0 in)
- Width: 74 mm (2.9 in)
- Height: 203.2 mm (8.00 in)
- Cartridge: .308 Winchester.277 Fury; 6.5mm Creedmoor
- Action: Bolt-action
- Feed system: 5-round detachable AICS-style box magazine
- Sights: none (Picatinny rail)

The SIG Sauer CROSS is a light-weight bolt-action rifle manufactured by SIG Sauer's North American branch headquartered in Newington, New Hampshire in the United States, as a "precision hunting rifle" designed to "meet the demands of both precision long-range shooting and extreme back country hunting", available in three different calibers. Announced in December 2019, it is the company's first bolt-action offering since the SSG 3000 was introduced in 1992.

The Cross is available on the civilian market in America from Sig Sauer.

== Specifications ==
The rifle is available in three chamberings: .308 Winchester, 6.5mm Creedmoor, or .277 Fury. (Note: .277 Fury is a new cartridge "designed for the US Army’s next generation squad weapons program.") Barrel length is either 16-inch (410 mm) for .308 Winchester and .277 Fury chamberings, or 18-inch (460 mm) for the 6.5mm Creedmoor chambering, both of which have a 1:8 barrel twist. Weight is either 6.5 pounds (2.9 kg) or 6.8 pounds (3.1 kg), respectively. The rifle is available in black or camouflage ("First Lite Cipher") finishes. Trigger-pull is adjustable from 2.5 lbf (11 N) to 4.5 lbf (20 N). and both have similarities with the Ritter & Stark SX-1 MTR. It features a M-LOK attachment system. The folding stock features an adjustable cheek rest and shoulder pad.
