= Parker-Hale =

British firearms manufacturer

- Industry: Arms industry
- Founded: Birmingham, England (1910)
- Founder: Alfred Gray Parker (1842–1915)
- Fate: Sold to Modular Industries Ltd.
- Headquarters: Birmingham, England
- Area served: Worldwide
- Key people: Alfred Gray Parker; Arthur Hale; John le Breton
- Products: Rifle sights, Gun cleaning equipment, Shooting accessories, Rifles, Shotguns

Parker-Hale Ltd. was primarily a British firearms accessory manufacturer for rifle sights, gun cleaning equipment and shooting accessories establishing a reputation among civilian marksmen and shooting clubs in the UK. It also made Firearms and air rifles. It was located in the Gun Quarter of Birmingham, England. It was founded by Alfred Gray Parker and Arthur Hale.

== History ==
Colour-Sergeant Alfred Gray Parker of the 1st V.B. Royal Warwickshire Regiment founded a rifle manufacturing company in 1880. In 1900 his nephew A T C Hale was taken into partnership, and the business was formed into a limited liability company in 1904. A first catalogue was issued of arms and shooting accessories and, though limited in its range, clearly showed the company's growing trend for the development of accessories.

By 1914 the company's small manufacturing plant was well established and the Ministry of Munitions ordered training equipment from Parker-Hale. The "Parkerifling" process, coupled with the Hiscock-Parker magazine, enabled service rifles to be converted to .22 Long Rifle (.22 LR) for use as training rifles, and demand was such that the Parker-Hale factory was soon working to full capacity. During and after World War I, Parker-Hale supplied rifles and accessories to marksmanship programs and small-bore competitions, including events at Bisley Camp.

The company expanded its product range to include sporting rifles, target rifles, and precision apertures, meeting growing demand from both civilian shooters and military cadet programs.

In 1924, Hale's son, Arthur, joined the business and in 1926, at the Bisley meeting, a family record was set up when A T C Hale (Managing Director) and his two eldest sons A C Hale & F C Hale all won places in the King's final stage. This event was eclipsed two years later when Arthur Hale succeeded in winning the coveted King's prize itself.

With the outbreak of the Second World War, the available resources of the gun trade had been mobilised to recondition a reserve of Pattern 1914 Enfield rifles, and in 1940 a subsidiary the Parker-Hale Arms Company was founded. Additional premises were acquired "for the duration" of the war and, under the management of Arthur Hale, a large reconditioning programme was rapidly carried through. A wide range of additional war contract work followed, principally with the manufacture of .30-06 Springfield and .303 British drill cartridges in large quantities.

After the close of hostilities, with a fall in production contracts and no permanent premises, the company had little choice but to invest in a small factory unit, erected under the Government's emergency programme to re-house bombed-out manufacturers. Meanwhile, the Parker-Hale Arms Company was transferred to the Birmingham Proof House, where it continued with the reconditioning of .22 LR weapons for junior training organisations. The wartime subsidiary was then disbanded, and the main company resumed its commercial activities in accessories and firearms.

The immediate post-war years can best be described as a period of frustrated opportunity, since overseas markets were opened but materials of all sorts were in short supply. Nevertheless, by 1948 business abroad far exceeded the home trade.

Business at Parker-Hale remained relatively stable throughout the 1960s and into the 1980s. Sales of target and sporting rifles occurred alongside the company’s broader portfolio of other firearms, shooting accessories and cleaning kits. Between the 1980s and 1990s, Parker-Hale manufactured the Series 500, 700, and 800 shotguns and the 600 series with the Ignacio Ugartechea factory in Eibar, Spain, they also produce exclusive rifle models.

The Parker Hale M85 rifle took part in the British Army trials for a replacement sniper rifle, along with the Accuracy International PM, Heckler & Koch PSG1, SIG-Sauer SSG 2000, and Remington 700. The rifle lost by a slight margin to the Accuracy International.

Lacking the investment necessary to enable the company to compete effectively in newly emerging markets, shrinking British firearms manufacturing and increased competition from foreign rifle manufacturers, Parker-Hale was eventually sold to the Midlands engineering group, Modular Industries Ltd. In 1992 the assets were later acquired by Navy Arms and spun off as Gibbs Rifle Company, Inc.

The Parker-Hale brand continues for gun-care products though firearms production ceased. In November 2000, John Rothery Wholesale (JRW) procured Parker-Hale Ltd merging operations into their Petersfield premises.

== Partial list of Parker-Hale firearms ==
Submachine guns:

- Parker-Hale PDW Related Patent

Shotguns:

- Parker-Hale Rogun
- Parker-Hale 500 (Midland) series - Italy
- Parker-Hale 600 (Ignacio Ugartechea) series - Spain
- Parker-Hale 700 series - Italy
- Parker-Hale 800 series

Rifles:

Sporting:	
	Sporter conversions based on Short Magazine Lee Enfield
Standard No.1	Calibre: .303 British, Barrel length: 25ins, Magazine capacity: 10, Weight: 10lbs
Supreme No.1	Calibre: .303 British, Barrel length: 22ins, Magazine capacity: 5, Weight: 7.5lbs
Custom No.1	Calibre: .303 British, Barrel length: 22ins, Magazine capacity: 5, Weight: 7lbs
	Sporter conversions based on No. 4 Lee Enfield
Standard No.4	Calibre: .303 British, Barrel length: 25.5ins, Magazine capacity: 10, Weight: 8lbs
Supreme No.4	Calibre: .303 British, Barrel length: 22ins, Magazine capacity: 5, Weight: 8lbs
Deluxe No.4	Calibre: .303 British, Barrel length: 22ins, Magazine capacity: 5, Weight: 8lbs
Custom No.4	Calibre: .303 British, Barrel length: 22ins, Magazine capacity: 5, Weight: 8lbs
	Mauser 98 action. C is Clip - detachable magazine as opposed to hinged floor plate - internal magazine
M81 Classic	Calibre: various, Barrel length: 24ins, Magazine capacity: 4, Weight: 7.75lbs
1000 Standard	Calibre: various, Barrel length: 22ins, Magazine capacity: 4, Weight: 7.25lbs
1100 Deluxe	First Model Calibre: various, Barrel length: 24ins, Magazine capacity: 4, Weight: 7lbs
1100 Deluxe	Second Model Calibre: various, Barrel length: 24ins, Magazine capacity: 4, Weight: 7lbs
1100	African Magnum Calibre: .375 H&H Magnum, .404, .458 Win Mag, Barrel length: 24ins, Magazine capacity: 4
1200 Super	Super Calibre: various, Barrel length: 24ins, Magazine capacity: 4, Weight:7.5lbs
1200M	Super Magnum Calibre: various, Magazine capacity: 3, Weight:7.5lbs
1200C	Super Clip Calibre: various, Magazine capacity: 4, Weight:7.75lbs
1200CM	Super Clip Magnum Calibre: various, Magazine capacity: 3, Weight:7.75lbs
1200V	Varmint Calibre: various, Barrel length: 24ins, Magazine capacity: 4, Weight:9lbs
2100	Midland Calibre: various, Barrel length: 22ins, Magazine capacity: 4, Weight: 7lbs
1300C	Scout (Gibbs) Calibre: .243 Win, 7.62x51, Barrel length: 20ins, Magazine capacity: 4/10, Weight: 8.5lbs
Target:	
T4 (Enfield Action)	Calibre: 7.62×51, Barrel length: 26ins, Weight: 10.25lbs
Excel (Mauser Action)	Calibre: 7.62x51, Barrel length: 26ins, Magazine capacity: 10, Weight: 10.25lbs
TX1200 / 1200TX (Mauser Action)	Mk 1 / Mk II - Calibre: 7.62x51, Barrel length: 26ins, Magazine capacity: 5, Weight: 10.5lbs
M84 (Mauser Action)	Canberra / Bisley - Calibre: 7.62x51, Barrel length: 27.5ins, Single shot, Weight: 11lbs
Elite (Mauser Action)	Calibre: 7.62x51, Civilian target rifle version of L81A2
Sniper:	
M82	Calibre: 7.62x51, Barrel length: 28ins, Magazine capacity: 4
L81A1 / M83	Calibre: 7.62x51
L81A2	Calibre: 7.62x51
C3	Calibre: 7.62x51
C3A1	Calibre: 7.62x51, Barrel length: 23.5ins, Weight 15.87lbs
M85	Calibre: 7.62x51, Barrel length: 24.5ins, Magazine capacity: 10, Weight 12.57lbs
M86	Calibre: 7.62x51, Barrel length: 27.5ins, Magazine capacity: 5
M87	Calibre: 7.62x51, .243 Win, 6.5x55, 30-06 Springfield, .300 Win Mag, Barrel length: 26ins, Magazine capacity: 5

Air rifles:

Parker-Hale Dragon Mk 1 and Mk 2	Calibre: .177, Barrel length: 20ins / .22, Barrel length 22ins; Sporting / target air rifle
Parker-Hale Phoenix Mk 1 and Mk 2	Calibre: .177 / .22, Barrel length: 23 3/4ins; Target rifle series
Parker-Hale Striker	Calibre: .177, Break-barrel, Entry-level air rifle
