= L42A1 =

Sniper rifle

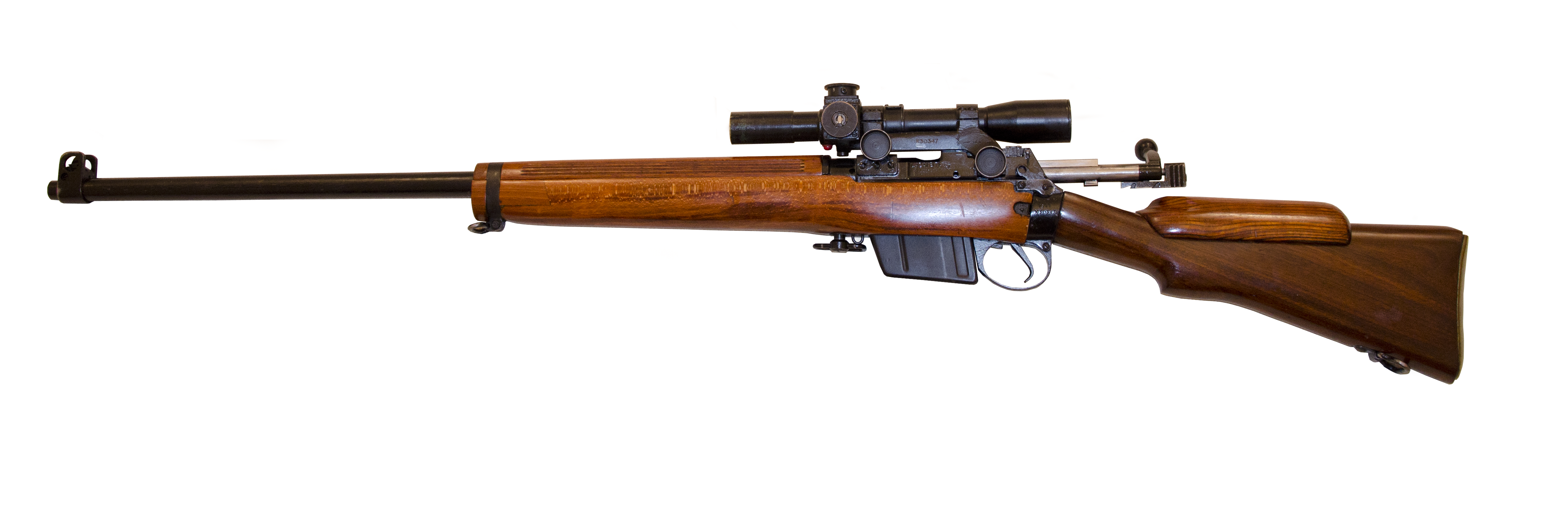
- Type: Sniper rifle
- Place of origin: United Kingdom

Service history
- In service: 1970–1990
- Used by: United Kingdom
- Wars: Dhofar Rebellion; The Troubles; Falklands War; Lebanese Civil War; Gulf War

Specifications
- Mass: 5.67 kg (12.5 lb)
- Length: 1,071 mm (3 ft 6.2 in)
- Barrel length: 699 mm (27.5 in)
- Cartridge: 7.62×51mm NATO
- Calibre: 7.62mm
- Action: Bolt-action
- Muzzle velocity: 838 m/s (2,750 ft/s)
- Effective firing range: 800 yd (730 m)
- Feed system: 10-round detachable box magazine
- Sights: Fixed front, adjustable rear sight

The L42A1 is a bolt-action sniper rifle chambered for the 7.62×51mm NATO cartridge. Used in the past by the British Army, Royal Marines and Royal Air Force RAF Regiment, the L42A1 entered service in 1970. It was replaced by the Accuracy International AW (as the L96A1) in 1985.

The L42A1 has been used in several conflicts, including the Dhofar Rebellion in Oman, The Troubles in Northern Ireland, the Falklands War, and the Gulf War.

The L42A1 was the last model in a long line of bolt-action rifles that used a rear-locking action designed by James Paris Lee for the British Army. This action design appeared first in the Lee–Metford rifle of 1888.

== Design details ==
The L42A1 was a 7.62×51mm NATO conversion of the Second World War era .303 British chambered Lee–Enfield Rifle No. 4 Mk1(T) and No. 4 Mk1*(T), which had remained in service for some time after the 7.62×51mm NATO L1A1 Self-Loading Rifle replaced the Rifle No.4 as the standard service rifle in 1957. It differed from other post-war No. 4 based variants in that the trigger remained hinged on the trigger guard as on the No.4 Mk1 and 1*, not hung from the receiver as in the later No. 4 Mk 2, Mk 1/2 and Mk 1/3 .303 British rifles, and other 7.62×51mm NATO conversions.

The conversion programme was carried out at Royal Small Arms Factory Enfield from 1970 to 1971 and about 1,080 rifles were converted. A new hammer-forged heavy 7.62×51mm NATO barrel was installed, with four-groove, right hand twist rifling instead of the five-groove left-hand Enfield-type rifling used in .303 British barrels. The heavier barrel was free-floating, which meant that the required accuracy standard could be achieved without the barrel bearing against the wooden fore-end, as had been the case with the No.4 MkI(T). Therefore, the woodwork was modified by shortening the fore-end to 1/2" in front of the middle band, and a new design for an upper handguard was fitted.

The No. 32 3.5 power telescopic sight was refurbished and the bullet drop compensation on the elevation drum modified for the ballistic characteristics of the 7.62×51mm NATO cartridge in 50 m (55 yd) increments out to 1,000 m (1,094 yd). The modified version was renamed the "Telescope, Straight Sighting, L1A1".

A new magazine suitable for the 7.62×51mm NATO cartridge was attached; it is recognizable by its more square shape when compared against the .303 British version. A hardened projection of the left magazine lip serves as an ejector, although the .303 British ejector screw remained in place. The butt with its screwed-on cheekpiece was retained, however the scope number on the wrist of the stock, was obliterated with "X"-outs, and new numbers applied. The markings on the left side of the receiver were obliterated and new markings reflecting the new rifle's designation and chambering were applied. The original markings are sometimes partially visible underneath.

A new, larger transit case was made for the L42A1.

== Variants ==
L39A1
A target-shooting variant produced for military full-bore shooting teams. It was similar to the L42A1, except it was fitted with Parker-Hale target tunnel front and micrometer-adjustable rear sights in lieu of the telescopic sight, and the butt did not have a sniper cheekpiece. The rifles were supplied without sights, which had to be fitted by the units to which they were issued. Some rifles are seen retrofitted with a curved pistol grip similar to the butt used on the No.8 .22 rifle. Since magazine loading was not required, the L39A1 as issued had a .303 British magazine, the follower of which served as a loading platform for single shot use, although 7.62×51mm NATO magazines are also seen fitted, as the receivers are machined to accept these. The barrel was the same hammer-forged, heavy 7.62×51mm NATO version fitted to the L42A1, fitted for a Parker-Hale type front sight band.

No.4 7.62mm CONV
As for L39A1, except the rifles were supplied from the factory with Parker-Hale 5c sights, No.8-style butt and 7.62×51mm magazine as standard. These rifles share the same serial number range as the L39A1, 1183 rifles (both types plus pre-production experimental types together). These rifles were mostly sent to the Army Rifle Association, and were available for purchase by military units.

Enfield Enforcer
A police-specific sniper variant used by various British police forces from the early 1970s. It was similar to the L39A1, with a commercial "Monte Carlo" style butt with semi-pistol grip and integral cheekpiece. It was provided with a high-quality East German-made Pecar Berlin telescopic sight. The telescope mounts were of commercial pattern; they did not resemble the No.4 Mk1(T) type screw-on mounts used on the L42A1. Target sights similar to those used on the L39A1 could also be fitted to the Enforcer. The 7.62×51mm NATO magazine was fitted, and 767 were made.

Enfield Envoy
Similar to the L39A1, but was produced with a higher standard of external finish for sale on the civilian market. It had a fore-end of broader cross section of the same shape as the No.8, and was supplied with a No.8 style butt.

== Users ==
Military users;

- United Kingdom: British Army, Royal Marines, and RAF Regiment – Enfield L42A1.

Police users;

- United Kingdom: British police forces – Enforcer (Police version).

Non-state military users

- Lebanese Forces: Enfield L42A1 and Enforcer rifles.

== See also ==
- M21 Sniper Weapon System
- M40 rifle
- Remington Model 700
- Savage 10FP/110FP
- SSG 82
- Steyr SSG 69
