= Accuracy International =

Specialist British firearms manufacturer

- Type: Limited company
- Industry: Defence industry
- Founded: 1978
- Founder: Malcolm Cooper, Sarah Cooper, Martin Kay, Dave Walls, David Caig
- Headquarters: Portsmouth, Hampshire, England
- Products: Anti-materiel rifles, sniper rifles
- Owner: FN Browning Group (since the 30 Oct. 2026); Dave Walls, Tom Irwin, Paul Bagshaw (2005 - 30 Oct.. 2026); Malcolm Cooper (10%) and a group of investors (1999 - 2005); Founders (until 1999)
- Number of employees: 92 (2022)
- Website: www.accuracyinternational.com

Accuracy International is a British firearms manufacturer based in Portsmouth, England. The company specialises in sniper rifles, anti-materiel rifles and civilian competition rifles.

== History ==
The company was founded in 1978 by a group of individuals including British Olympic shooting gold medalist Malcolm Cooper, Sarah Cooper, and Martin Kay, along with the technical and production specialists and firearms designers Dave Walls and David Caig.

The selection of the Accuracy International PM (Precision Magazine) rifle and British Army adoption into service in 1984 as the L96A1 marked their first major sniper rifle sale. The British military selection process was the impetus for outsourcing and professionalising (test) arms production, enabling a recently founded small company to successfully participate. Since then Accuracy International's sniper rifles have been used by a multitude of military units and police departments across the world.

Following a period of financial hardship, Accuracy International faced liquidation in 2005. Nevertheless, a British consortium, led by Tom Irwin and the initial design duo of Dave Walls and David Caig, intervened to ensure the company's continuity.

On 28 May 2026 the FN Browning Group has announced that they entered into an acquisition agreement to purchase Accuracy International as an independent subsidiary for an undisclosed amount of money. On 30 October 2026, FN Browning Group has completed the acquisition.

== Management ==
As of 2014, the company is managed by two directors and owners, Tom Irwin and Dave Walls.

== Production ==
Accuracy International's primary rifle platforms include the AT-X, AXSR, and AX-ELR, all of which are multi-caliber systems.

In September 2023, the U.S. Customs and Border Protection announced the award of a $5 million indefinite delivery/indefinite quantity (IDIQ) contract for its new Modular Precision Weapon Platform (MPWP). The Australian Defence Force selected the multi-caliber, long-range AXSR as its new sniper rifle system under the LAND 159 Lethality Program.

== Distribution ==
Accuracy International's distribution in the United States is managed by the American division of AI, Accuracy International of North America, Inc. There are only two official retail distributors of Accuracy International in the United States: Eurooptic and Mile High Shooting. Mile High is the exclusive law enforcement distributor for the USA.

Similarly in the United Kingdom, there are only two official retail distributors of Accuracy International products: Sporting Services Ltd and Sportsman Gun Centre.

== Magazine types ==
Different Accuracy International rifle models come with a variety of proprietary magazines.

Model	Caliber	Stacking and feeding
AICS (short action)	.223.308	Double stack, single feed
AICS (long action)	.300 Win Mag	Single stack, single feed
AICS (long action)	.338 Lapua Mag	Single stack, single feed
AX AICS	.308	Double stack, single feed
AX AICS	.300 Win Mag	Single stack, single feed
AX AICS	.338 Lapua Mag	Single stack, single feed
AE MkI (pre 2009)	.308	Single stack, single feed
AE MkII/ MkIII	.308	Double stack, single feed
AX rifle	.308	Double stack, staggered feed
AX rifle	.300 Win Mag	Double stack, staggered feed
AX rifle	.338 Lapua Mag	Double stack, staggered feed
AW rifle	.308	Double stack, staggered feed
AW rifle	.300 Win Mag	Single stack, single feed
AW rifle	.338 Lapua Mag	Single stack, single feed
AW50, AX50	.50 BMG	Single stack, single feed

=== AICS-style magazine ===
The "AICS-style" short action box magazine was originally manufactured for the Accuracy International Chassis System but can now be found on several production rifles, such as the SIG Sauer CROSS, the Ruger Gunsite Scout, Ruger Precision Rifle, some Ruger American Rifle models, and some new production models by Remington (Model 700 PCR, 700 Tactical Chassis, 700 Magpul, and 700 Magpul Enhanced). AICS-style magazines can also be found on many custom rifles, and aftermarket conversion kits (known as "bottom metals") are available for several different rifle models and are made by several different manufacturers. Many conversion kits require fitting ("inletting") by a gunsmith.
