= Accuracy International Arctic Warfare =

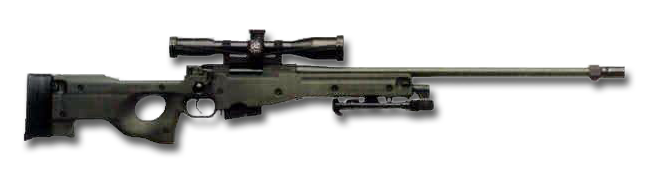
- Accuracy International Arctic Warfare (Adopted by Sweden as the Prickskyttegevär 90)
- Type: Sniper rifle
- Place of origin: United Kingdom

Service history
- In service: 1982 (L96A1), 1988 (AW), 1990–present
- Used by: See Users
- Wars: Iraq War; War in Afghanistan; Insurgency in the North Caucasus; Syrian Civil War; Russo-Ukrainian War

Production history
- Designed: 1982 (PM), 1983 (AW)
- Manufacturer: Accuracy International
- Produced: 1982–present

Specifications
- Mass: 6.5 kg (14.3 lb)
- Length: 1,180 mm (46.5 in)
- Barrel length: 660 mm (26.0 in)
- Cartridge: 7.62×51mm NATO; .300 Winchester Magnum; .308 Winchester; .338 Lapua Magnum
- Action: Bolt-action
- Muzzle velocity: 850 m/s (2,790 ft/s)
- Effective firing range: 800 m (870 yd)
- Maximum firing range: 3,943 m (4,312 yd)
- Feed system: 10-round double stack detachable box magazine (.308); 5-round single stack detachable box magazine (.300, .338)
- Sights: Detachable aperture type iron sights Day or night optics

The Accuracy International Arctic Warfare rifle is a bolt-action sniper rifle designed and manufactured by the British company Accuracy International. It has proved popular as a civilian, police, and military rifle since its introduction in the 1980s. The rifles have features that improve performance in extremely cold conditions (which gave the rifle its name) without impairing operation in less extreme conditions.

Arctic Warfare rifles are generally fitted with a Schmidt & Bender Police & Military II (PM II) telescopic sight with fixed or variable magnification. Variable telescopic sights can be used if the operator wants more flexibility to shoot at varying ranges, or when a wide field of view is required. Accuracy International actively promotes fitting the German-made Schmidt & Bender PM II product line as sighting components on their rifles, which is rare for a rifle manufacturer. The German and Russian forces preferred a telescopic sight made by Zeiss over Accuracy International's recommendation.

== History ==
=== Original design ===
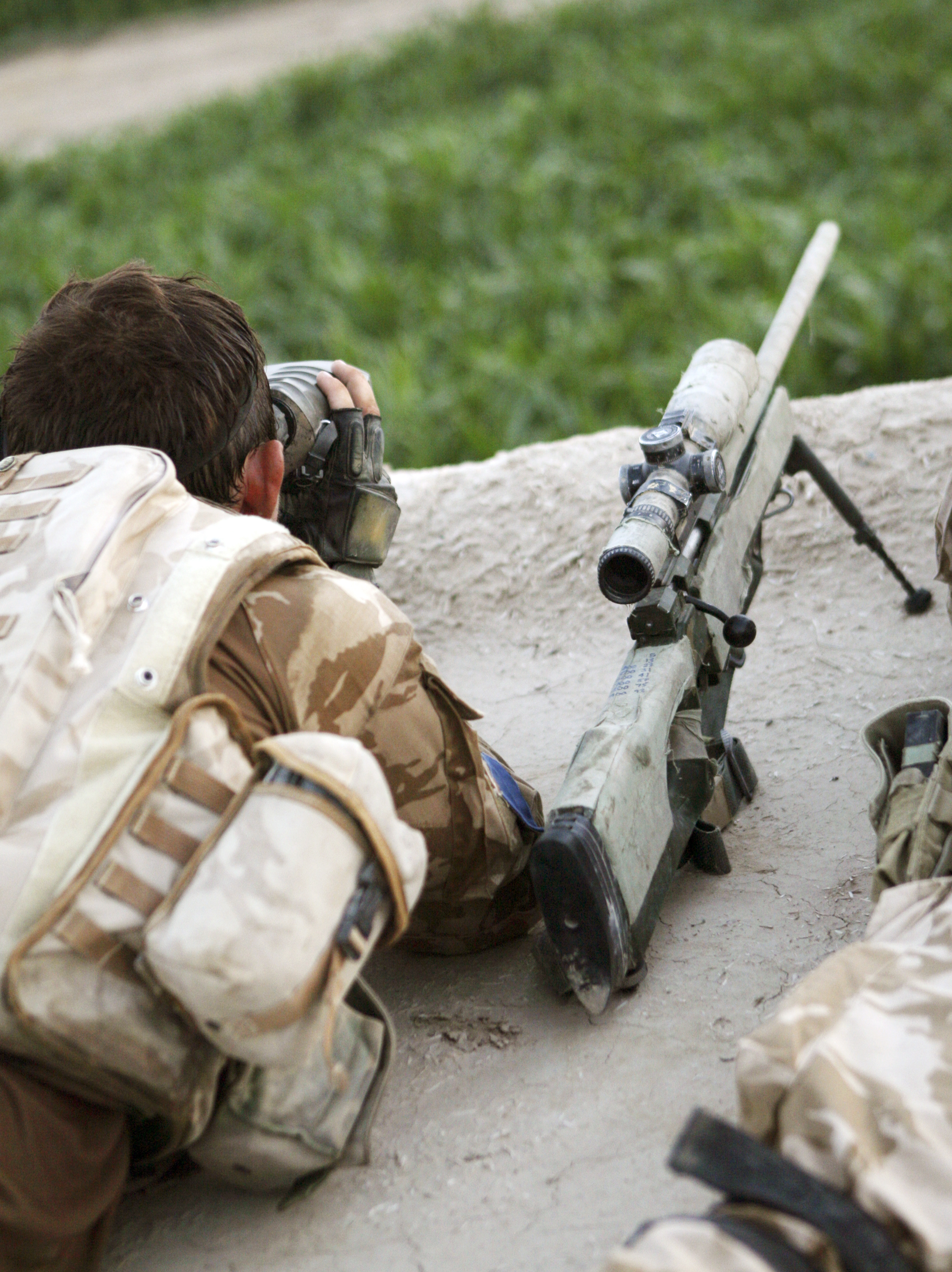
2 PARA sniper on operations in 2008; the L96A1 at his side can be distinguished from the later Arctic Warfare series by its squarer buttstock and lack of a flash hider, with most examples also having a front sight post.

The origin of the then innovative design ideas goes back to Olympic shooting gold medalist Malcolm Cooper, and the technical and production specialists and gun smiths Dave Walls and David Caig, operating from a modestly equipped shed and predates the foundation of Accuracy International. The Accuracy International PM (Precision Marksman) rifle was entered into a British competition after the Falklands War in the early 1980s as a replacement for the Lee–Enfield derived sniper rifles then in use by the British Army (e.g. L42A1). The selection process was the impetus for outsourcing and professionalizing (test) arms production, enabling a recently founded small company to participate. The Accuracy International PM was selected over the Parker Hale M85, Heckler & Koch PSG1, SIG Sauer SSG 2000, and Remington 700. The British Army adopted the Accuracy International PM in 1984 into service as the L96A1 and outfitted the rifle with Schmidt & Bender 6×42 telescopic sights designated the L13A1. In this configuration the rifle is capable of first shot hits with a cold, warm or fouled barrel. Tests with 10.89 g (168 gr) ammunition provided sub 0.5 MOA ten-shot groups at 91 m (100 yd). The rifle was supplied with a telescopic sight, bipod, five magazines, sling, cleaning kit and tool roll, encased in a fitted transport case.

=== Design evolution ===
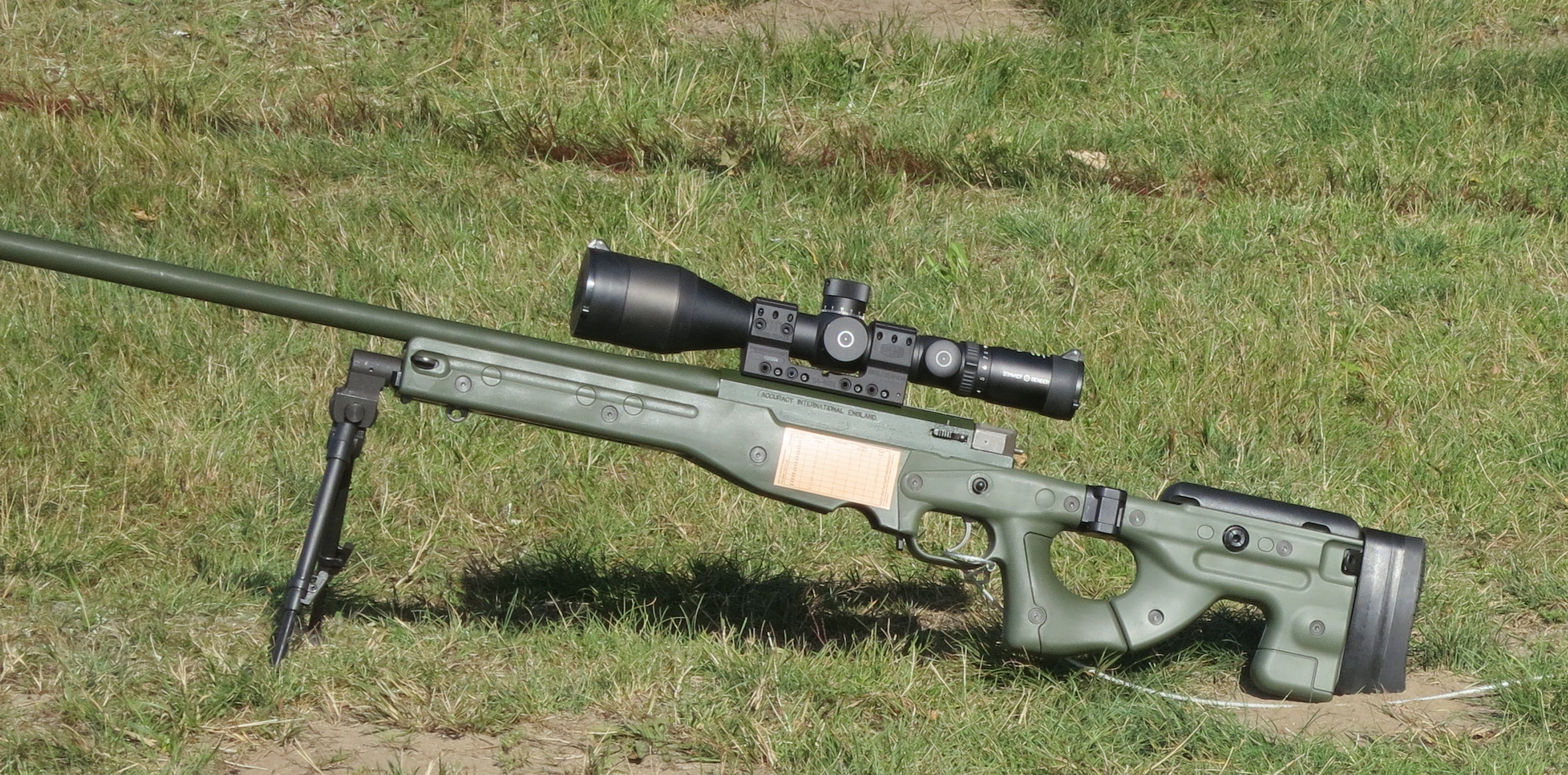
The Swedish Prickskyttegevär 90 variant introduced cold weather upgrades (Prickskyttegevär 90B pictured)

Some years later, the Swedish military wanted to replace the 6.5×55mm chambered m/1941B rifle with a new sniper rifle, and in the early 1990s Accuracy International introduced an upgraded version of the PM: the AW (Arctic Warfare). This was the start of the Arctic Warfare name, which became the primary name of the rifle family despite its earlier names.

Special de-icing features allow it to be used effectively at temperatures as low as −40 °C (−40 °F). The AW rifle featured a modified bolt with milled slots at the rear of the bolt to prevent bolt binding problems caused by penetrating water/ice, dirt, or similar debris. Further, the thumb-hole, bolt handle, magazine release, and trigger guard on the AW were enlarged, and the magazine floor plate was fitted with protruding grasping tabs to allow use with heavy Arctic mittens. The resin stock side-panels were replaced with sturdier polymer panels that were less brittle in subzero temperatures. The safety was revised to a 3-position safety allowing the bolt to be cycled with a locked trigger. Fitted with a Kikarsikte 90 10×42 Hensoldt ZF 500 telescopic sight, this version was accepted into use by the Swedish Army in 1991 as the Prickskyttegevär 90 (Psg 90).

The British Army decided to adopt the modifications, which they designated L115A1 (fixed stock variant) and L115A2 (folding stock variant). The rifles were fitted with Schmidt & Bender PM II 3-12×50 telescopic sights offering the operator more flexibility to shoot at varying ranges, or in situations when a wide field of view is required. The stocks were fitted with a butt spike. This rifle has seen service in conflicts such as Operation Granby and Operation Telic.

In 2011 some Swedish Psg 90 rifles were modernized to the Prickskyttegevär 90B (Psg 90B) standard, whereby the rifles were fitted with folding stocks, Swedish-made Spuhr SA-4601 mounts and accessories, and Kikarsikte 11 Schmidt & Bender PM II 3-12×50 telescopic sights.

=== Rifle system family ===
The Accuracy International Arctic Warfare model has since spawned an entire family of sniper rifles using the Arctic Warfare name, and has been adopted by a number of other countries, including Australia, Belgium, Germany, Indonesia, Ireland, Latvia, Malaysia, Norway, the Netherlands, New Zealand, Russia, Singapore, Spain, Sweden and the United Kingdom. Other AI rifles descended from the L96A1 include the AI AE, and the AI AS50 (see variants below).

Most Arctic Warfare rifles are chambered for the 7.62×51mm NATO cartridge, but Accuracy International also made variants of the sniper rifle - the AWM (Arctic Warfare Magnum) chambered in either .300 Winchester Magnum or .338 Lapua Magnum, and the AW50 (Arctic Warfare .50 calibre) chambered for the .50 BMG (12.7×99mm NATO). The sniper rifles are mounted with a muzzle brake in order to help reduce the recoil, muzzle raise and muzzle flash of the weapon.

Each country's rifles differ slightly. The Swedish Psg 90 for example, uses a Hensoldt (Zeiss) scope and can also use sabot rounds. In 1998, the German Bundeswehr adopted the first folding-stock Arctic Warfare Magnum (AWM-F) chambered in .300 Winchester Magnum (7.62×67mm) and with optics made by the German company Zeiss, and designated as the Scharfschützengewehr 22 (G22).

The AW's complete parts interchangeability and reliability in adverse weather conditions have made it a popular, if expensive, weapon. The rifle offers good accuracy (a capable marksman can expect ≤ 0.5 MOA consistent accuracy with appropriate ammunition), and its maximum effective range with a Schmidt & Bender 6×42 PM II scope is around 800 metres (870 yd).

== Design details ==
The AW system is almost unique in being a purpose-designed military sniper rifle, rather than an accurised version of an existing general-purpose rifle.

The modular design of the AW system allows for flexibility, serviceability and repairability under field and combat conditions. Major components, such as the barrel and the bolt, can be switched between rifles, or replaced in the field by their operator with the help of some tools. The chambering can also be switched by the operator as long as the barrels, bolts and feeding mechanism can handle the shape and size of the cartridges.

=== Features ===
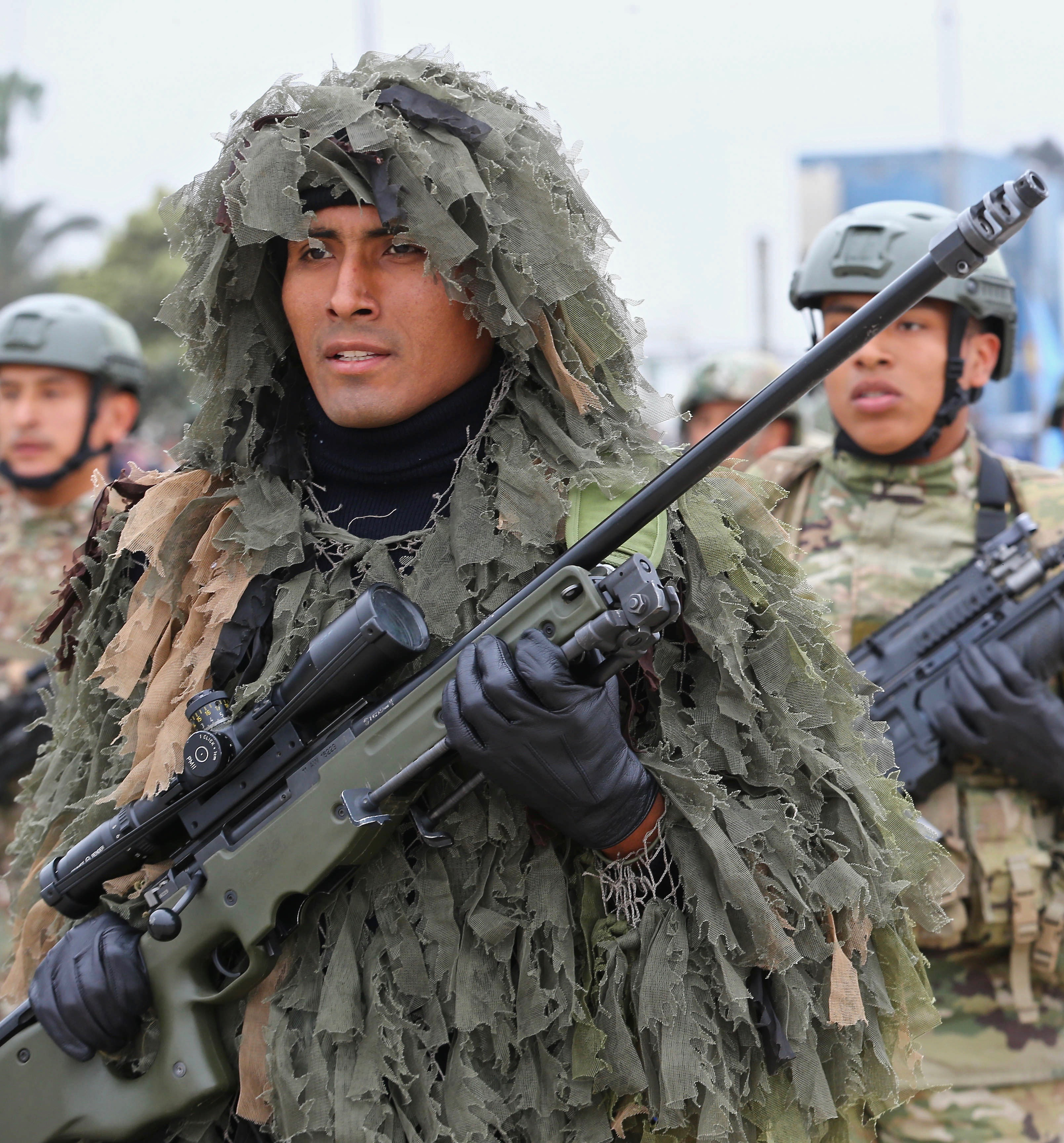
Sniper of the Peruvian Armed Forces equipped with an Arctic Warfare rifle

Rather than a traditional wooden or polymer rifle stock, the AW is based on an aluminium chassis which extends the entire length of the stock. This chassis system is marketed as the Accuracy International Chassis System (AICS) and can be used for all Accuracy International rifles. All other components, including the receiver, are bolted directly to this chassis. Two hollow polymer "half thumb-hole stock panels", usually coloured green, dark earth or black, are in turn bolted to each other through the chassis, creating a rugged yet, for its sturdiness, comparatively light weapon.

The Accuracy International receiver is bolted with four screws and permanently bonded with epoxy material to the aluminium chassis, and was designed for ruggedness, simplicity and ease of operation. To this end, the heavy-walled, flat-bottomed, flat-sided receiver is a stressed part, machined in-house by AI from a solid piece of forged carbon steel. AW rifles are supplied in two action lengths—standard AW (short) and long SM (magnum). The six bolt lugs, arranged in two rows of three, engage a heat-treated steel locking ring insert pinned inside the front bridge of the action. The ring can be removed and replaced to refresh headspace control on older actions. The AW system cast steel bolt has a 0.75-inch (19.05 mm) diameter combined with gas relief holes in a 0.785 in (19.9 mm) diameter bolt body and front action bridge allowing high-pressure gases a channel of escape in the event of a cartridge-case head failure. Against penetrating water or dirt the bolt has milled slots, which also prevent freezing or similar disturbances. Unlike conventional bolt-action rifles, the bolt handle is bent to the rear, which eases the repeating procedure for the operator and reduces the contour of the weapon. The action cocks on opening with a short, 60 degree bolt throw and has a non-rotating (fixed) external extractor and an internal ejector. Firing pin travel is 0.26 in (6.6 mm) to keep lock times to a minimum. Finally, an 11 mm (0.43 in) integral dovetail rail located above the receiver is designed to accommodate different types of optical or electro-optical sights. As an option, a MIL-STD-1913 rail (Picatinny rail) can be permanently pinned, bonded and bolted to the action, providing a standard interface for many optical systems.

=== Ammunition feeding ===
Cartridges are fed through the bottom of the receiver using a detachable, double-stack, steel box magazine. Rifles chambered for .300 Winchester Magnum or larger use a single-stack magazine. Alternatively cartridges can be loaded singly directly into the chamber if no rounds are present in the magazine.

=== Barrel ===
The free-floating, heavy, stainless steel barrels (stainless steel resists throat erosion better than normal barrels) for the available cartridge chamberings all have a different length, groove cutting and rifling twist rate optimised for their chambering and intended ammunition. For .243 Winchester, the twist rate is 254 mm (1 in 10 in), and for .308 Winchester/7.62×51mm NATO variants it is 305 mm (1 in 12 in), except for the suppressed-barrel variant. If the consistent accuracy requirement of an operator is no longer met, the barrel can fairly easily be renewed. This is normal practice for active high-performance precision rifle operators, who regard barrels as replaceable. The barrels are provided by Australian company Maddco Rifle Barrels (button rifled), and Scottish company Border Barrels, who cut-rifles them on Pratt & Whitney rifling benches. Twists are one turn in 10, 11, 12, 13 and 14 inches for 7.62 MM depending on RFP.

=== Safety ===
A three-position, firing pin blocking safety lever on the bolt shroud allows the bolt to be manipulated with the safety on. If the weapon is cocked, the firing pin can be felt at the end of the bolt action, making it possible in poor visibility to feel whether the weapon is ready to fire. The safety-catch of the weapon is also positioned at the rear, showing white if the safety is on, red if not.

=== Trigger ===
The two-stage trigger mechanism has an adjustable trigger pull weight of 10 to 20 N (2.2 to 4.4 lb_{f}). The trigger assembly can be easily removed for cleaning by undoing two socket-head cap screws.

=== Accessories ===
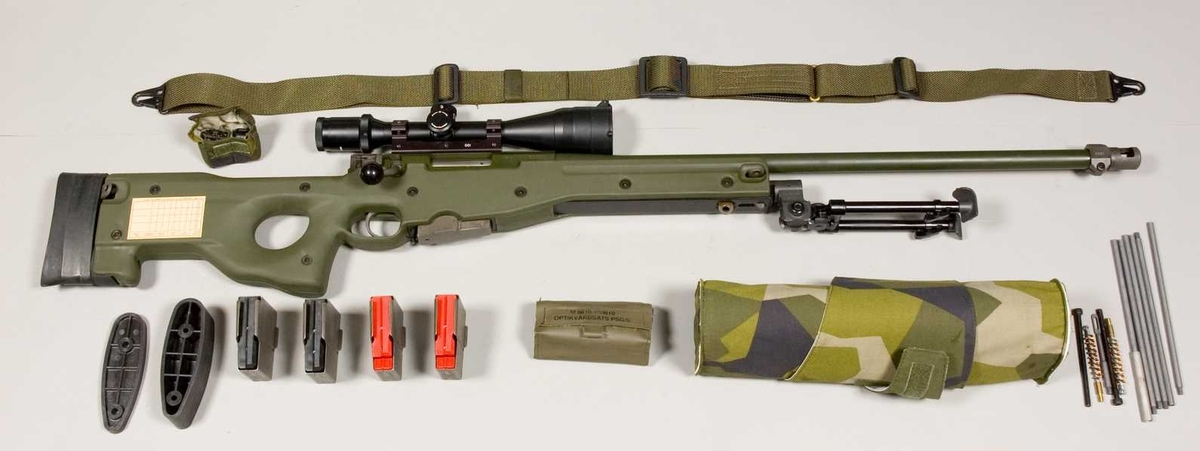
Swedish Prickskyttegevär 90 with accessories

The AW is usually equipped with an integrated bipod and it also has a monopod mounted on the buttstock.

Accuracy International accessories for the Arctic Warfare system include a selection of PM II series telescopic sights made by Schmidt & Bender with laser filters for the military scopes, aluminium one-piece telescopic sight mounting sets, MIL-STD-1913 rails (Picatinny rails), lens hoods, various optical and kill flash filters and lens covers for telescopic sights, auxiliary iron sights for emergency use, cleaning kits, muzzle brakes/flash-hiders and suppressors, butt plates and spacers to regulate the length of pull and butt angle to the requirements of the individual shooter, buttspikes, bipod (adapters), handstops, mirage bands, soft and heavy-duty transit cases and various maintenance tools.

== Accuracy International Chassis System ==
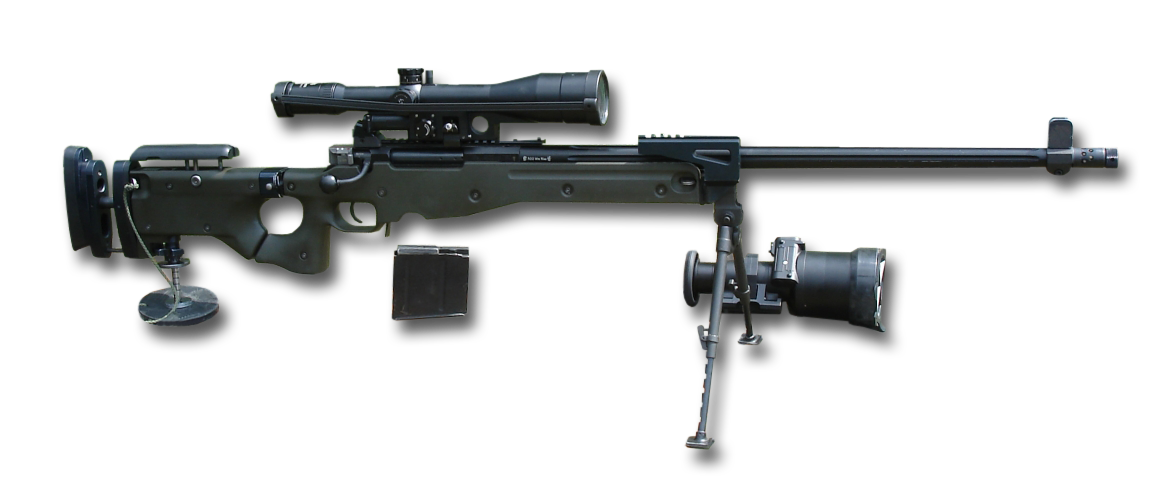
G22 of the German Army with an AICS 2.0 stock.

The Accuracy International Chassis System (AICS) can be configured for various actions (all Accuracy International and some Remington 700 receivers), triggers, and other items. The AICS version for Remington 700 receivers was introduced in 1999. U.S. distributors started selling AICS chassis systems in late 2012 for Savage Arms' Model 10 series of precision long range rifles. These Savage Arms rifles are primarily for the law enforcement applications. There are three variants of AICS chassis system. The basic variant is the AICS 1.0 with a fixed cheek-piece. The AICS 1.5 variant has a fully adjustable cheek-piece. The AICS 2.0 is a folding stock that reduces the rifle's overall length by 210 mm (8.3 in) when folded and adds 0.2 kg (0.44 lb) to the rifle's total weight. The AICS 1.5 and 2.0 both have cheek-piece design that adjusts sideways and for height for optimal cheek position when using night vision equipment, or telescopic sights with large objective lenses. There is also a quick-adjust cheek-piece option that has a spring-loaded cheek-piece in conjunction with a quick-adjust butt plate.

The AICS side panels are made from a high-strength polymer and are available in the colours olive drab, dark earth or black.

Sling attachment points are mounted on each side of the rifle, so it can be carried flat against the back and used comfortably by left- and right-handed users. A front attachment point is situated below the fore end and can be used to anchor a target style sling or replaced by an adapter for a Harris bipod.

=== Mk 13 ===
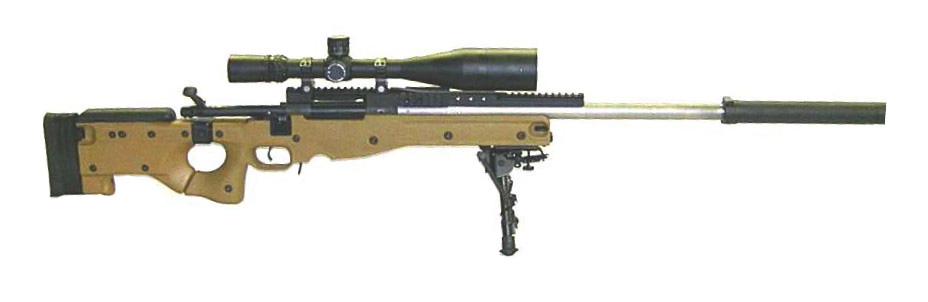
US Navy Mk 13 MOD 5 SWS using an AICS 2.0 stock and a Remington 700 based receiver.

The United States Special Operations Command uses the AICS as the Mk 13 Mod 5 rifle chambered in .300 Winchester Magnum. The Mk 13 Mod 5 utilises the "long-action" bolt of the Remington 700/M24 receiver and has a precision barrel that can be fitted with the suppressor of the Mk 11. It has a 3-sided Modular Accessory Rail System (MARS) for mounting optics on top and Picatinny rail accessories on each side, and a folding bipod. The Mk 13 is to be gradually replaced by the Modular Sniper Rifle in US Army use.

==== Mk 13 Mod 7 ====
In April 2018, the U.S. Marine Corps announced they would be replacing the M40 sniper rifle with the Mk 13 Mod 7; the M40 had been in service with the Marines since 1966, with the latest M40A6 being upgraded in 2014. The Mk 13 chambered in .300 Winchester Magnum increases range from 1,000 metres with the M40 to 1,300 metres, giving Marine snipers similar capabilities to the U.S. Army M2010 Enhanced Sniper Rifle.

=== AX AICS stock ===
An AX series Accuracy International Chassis System (AICS) stock is also available for Remington 700 short and long bolt action based rifles.

=== AT AICS stock ===
An AT series Accuracy International Chassis System (AICS stock) is also available for Remington 700 short and long bolt action based rifles, Savage M10 short action and Tikka T3 short action rifles.

== Variants ==
There are two main types of AW series models. Models offered by AI, and type classified models in service with governments. AW models are related to, but not necessarily exactly synonymous with specific models adopted by countries.

=== PM (Precision Marksman) ===
The rifle from which the Arctic Warfare family was developed. In this original form, it entered service in the UK in the mid-1980s, and designated as the L96A1 (chambered for 7.62×51mm NATO). 35 suppressed guns known as the PM-SD were built and were exclusively used by UK special forces. (Two were purchased by the Metropolitan Police, but never used.)

=== AW (Arctic Warfare) ===
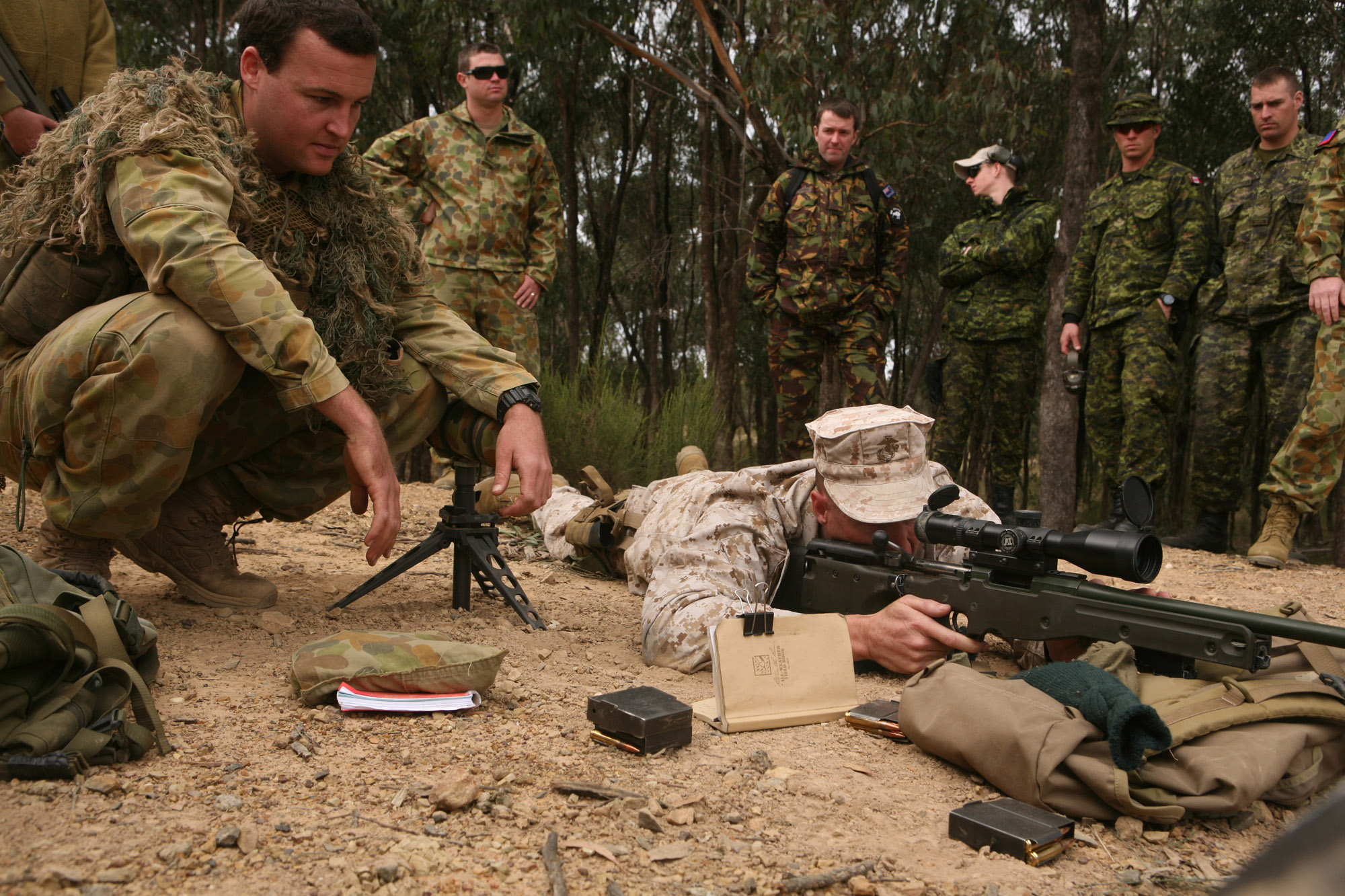
Australian SR-98

The basic "improved" version of the L96A1. The name stems from special features designed to enable operation in extremely cold climates.

Adopted as the following (All versions mentioned are chambered for the 7.62×51mm NATO cartridge and uses a 10-round detachable magazine):

- L118A1: The British military service version.
- Psg 90: The Swedish military service version. Psg is short for Prickskyttegevär ("Sniper Rifle").
- SR98: The Australian military service version. It is the standard issue sniper rifle for the Australian Army and is also used by various law enforcement agencies. This variant features a threaded barrel (for a suppressor); an integrated, adjustable bipod, a folding stock, an adjustable butt pad, a cheek pad and a rear monopod.

According to the Accuracy International AW brochure, the AW can be chambered either in 7.62×51mm NATO and .243 Winchester, though on special request other calibres that will function with the AW bolt action can be fitted.

==== AWF (Arctic Warfare Folding) ====
The AWF is a variant of the AW with side-folding polymer stock.

- L118A2: The British military service version.
- Psg 90B: The Swedish military service version.

=== AWP (Arctic Warfare Police) ===
The AWP is a version intended for use by law enforcement as opposed to military, with AWP standing for Arctic Warfare Police. The most notable feature is that the distinctive frame is black instead of light green. It also has a shorter 24 in (610 mm) barrel than the AW model. The AWP is normally chambered for 7.62×51mm NATO/.308 Winchester or .243 Winchester ammunition, though it can be chambered for other cartridges. The AWP is distinct from the Accuracy International AW AE, which also has a black finish but is a cheaper non-military version of the AW series.

=== AWS (Arctic Warfare Suppressed) ===
The AWS is specifically designed for use with subsonic ammunition which, depending on the target, gives an effective maximum range of around 300 metres (330 yd). Its noise levels are similar to those generated by .22 LR match ammunition. The weapon is fitted with a special .308 Winchester/7.62×51mm NATO 406 mm (16 in) long barrel which has a twist rate of 229 mm (1 in 9 in) and an integral suppressor. The aluminum alloy integral suppressor is fitted over the barrel and can be removed by the user. The use of supersonic ammunition is possible, but will result in accelerated barrel/suppressor combination wear and a sonic boom causes noise level increase. The AWS barrel/suppressor combination has a total length of 711 mm (28 in), which keeps the weapon's overall length within normal limits. The user can remove the barrel/suppressor combination and replace it with a standard AW or AWP barrel in about three minutes. As with all such systems, the sight will need re-zeroing after a barrel change.

=== AWC (Arctic Warfare Covert) ===
The Covert system is essentially an AWS with a folding stock with a 305 mm (12 in) long barrel/integral suppressor combination with a 203 mm (1 in 8 in) twist rate. The aluminum alloy integral suppressor is fitted over the barrel and can be removed by the user. The user can also remove the barrel/suppressor combination and replace it with a standard much longer AW or AWP barrel. The AWC is supplied in a small suitcase which houses the rifle with the stock folded and the barrel/integral suppressor combination detached. The polymer suitcase is lined with closed-cell foam featuring cut-outs for the stock/action/optics/bipod combination, the bolt, the suppressor, a magazine and a box of ammunition. While the Covert system's compacted size is considerably smaller than that of any conventional system, its special barrel and integral suppressor keep the weapon's overall length within normal limits when deployed.

It is notably used by the USSOCOM 1st SFOD-D (Delta Force), the British Special Air Service and the German KSK (designated G25)

=== AWM (Arctic Warfare Magnum) ===
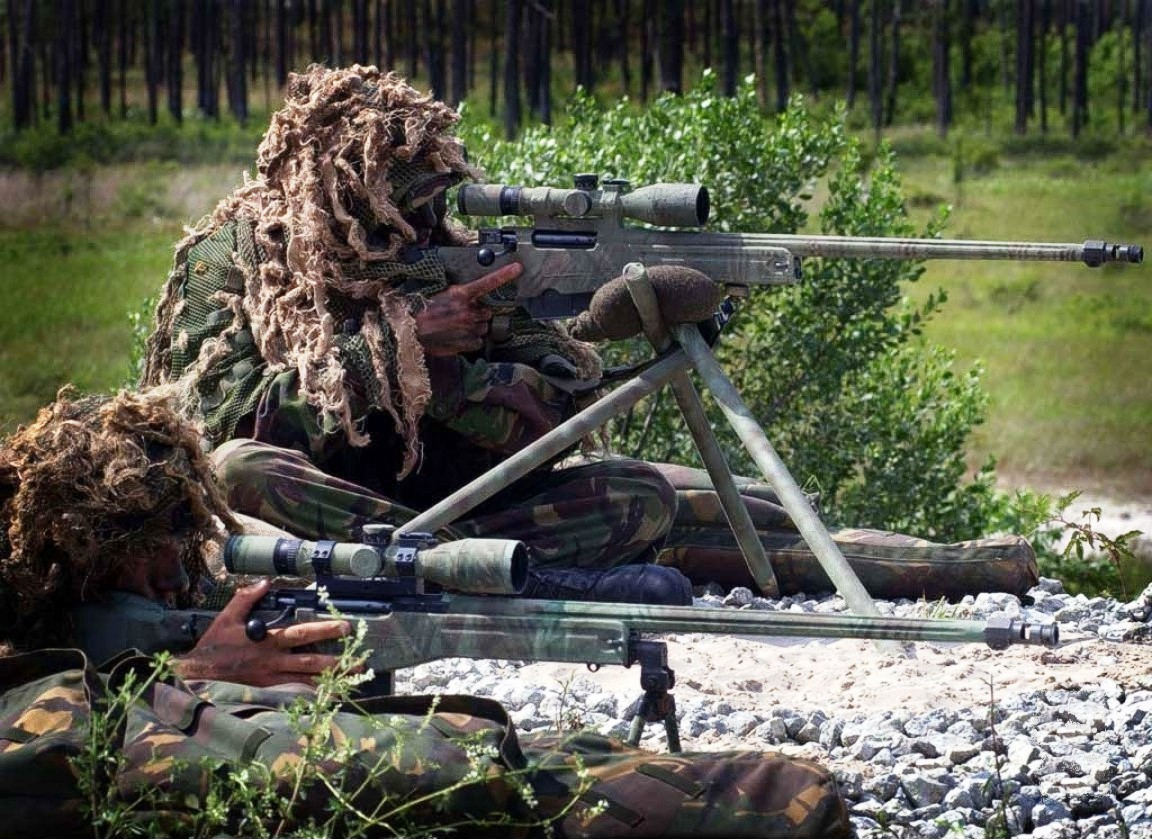
Royal Marines with L115A1 rifles.

The AWM is a variant of the AW sniper rifle that is chambered for either the .300 Winchester Magnum or the .338 Lapua Magnum. It has a longer bolt compared to the AW, in order to accommodate for the larger and more powerful magnum cartridges. It is fed through a 5-round detachable magazine.

The AWM that is chambered for the .338 Lapua Magnum cartridge has been adopted since its first introduction in the British army and in the Dutch army in 1996. (See the Arctic Warfare Magnum article for the full list.)

The British Armed Forces adopted the AWM that is chambered for the .338 Lapua Magnum and designated it as the L115A1 and in November 2007, it was announced that the British Army, Royal Marines and RAF Regiment were to get an improved variant of the L115A1, the L115A3.

==== AWM-F (Arctic Warfare Magnum Folding Stock) ====
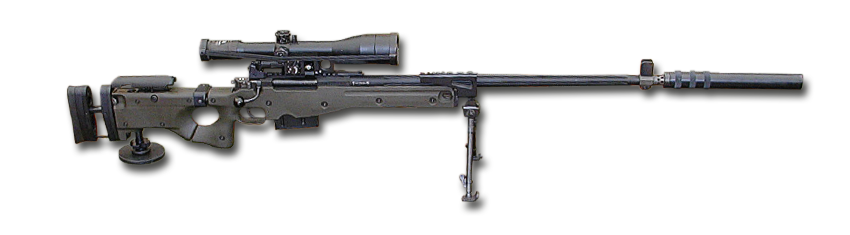
G22 of the German Army with attached suppressor

The AWM-F was the first AW variant featuring a folding stock and has been adopted since its first introduction in the German Army in 1998, and by other several armies. (See the Arctic Warfare Magnum article for the full list.)

The G22 (Gewehr 22 or Scharfschützengewehr 22) by German Army, it features a folding stock and is chambered for the .300 Winchester Magnum round (designated 7.62×67mm).

The Dutch army also adopted the AWM-F that is chambered for the .338 Lapua Magnum.

=== AW50 (Arctic Warfare .50 calibre) ===
The AW50 was introduced in 2000 by the British and Australian armed forces and is an AW rifle re-engineered and chambered for .50 BMG (12.7×99mm NATO).

The German Army adopted the AW50 and designated it as the G24 (Gewehr 24 or Scharfschützengewehr 24).

==== AW50F (Arctic Warfare .50 calibre Folding Stock) ====
The AW50F is a variant of the AW50 adopted by the Australian military. It differs from the standard AW50 in that it is fitted with a folding stock (hence the F) and Maddco barrel.

== AE (Accuracy Enforcement) ==
The Accuracy International AE was introduced in 2001 as a cheaper, somewhat simplified, less robust version of the L96/AW series intended for law enforcement, in place of the more expensive AWP or AW models intended for military use. The round AE receiver differs from the larger, more angular AW receiver design and is lighter than in the AW models. The AE receiver is bolted with screws and can be removed as it is not permanently bonded with epoxy material to the aluminium chassis. Unlike the AW models, the AE can not be ordered in a left-handed configuration. The AE is chambered in 7.62×51mm NATO cartridge and its barrel is 610 mm (24 in) long.

=== AE Mk III ===
In 2009, the AE was updated to the AE Mk III. The AE Mk III sniper rifle system uses AICS 5- and 10-round magazines, has a removable trigger group, and a screw-adjustable cheekpiece. An optional 508 mm (20.0 in) barrel with muzzle brake or tactical suppressor mounting facilities and a folding chassis are available.

Accuracy International has discontinued the AE sniper rifles. In 2014, Accuracy International introduced the AT308 or the AT (Accuracy Tactical) sniper rifle, which is a more modern variant of the AE (Accuracy Enforcement) sniper rifle, and will be offered to law enforcement and civilian clients worldwide.

== AT (Accuracy Tactical) ==
The AT (Accuracy Tactical) model was introduced in 2014 as a cheaper alternative to the more expensive AX series which are intended for military use. The AT on the other hand is intended for law enforcement and civilian use. Like the AX series the AT continues the legacy of the Arctic Warfare sniper rifle and is also an improvement of the AE (Accuracy Enforcement) sniper rifle.

The AT is chambered in 7.62×51mm NATO/.308 Winchester. It is a manual operated, bolt action sniper rifle. It features a rotary bolt with six locking lugs, arranged into three pairs at the bolt head, a polymer stock with aluminium alloy chassis, and a solid, flat-bottomed receiver made of steel, the AI (Accuracy International) muzzle brake (optional), a detachable suppressor, a 20-, 24- inch plain or threaded barrel, and a 26-inch threaded barrel only, a 10-round detachable magazine, an integral Picatinny (Mil-Std 1913) rail above the receiver for mounting various optics/scopes and an additional accessory rails can be easily bolted to the forend of the rifle for mounting various accessories, a standard stock that is made from a polymer and features fully adjustable comb and buttpad, side-folding stock that folds to the left is available, a two-stage trigger that is adjustable for trigger weight between 1.5 and 2 kg.

== AX series ==
The Accuracy International AX long range sniper rifle series was designed for long, high-powered super magnum cartridges and was unveiled in January 2010 at the SHOT Show trade show. It is a major design evolution based on the AWM variant of the AW series and its development was according to Accuracy International partly driven by a Precision Sniper Rifle (PSR) U.S. Special Operations Command solicitation. The PSR contract was awarded in 2013 to Remington Arms for their Modular Sniper Rifle.

The AX series comprises the multi calibre AXMC chambered either in .338 Lapua Magnum, .300 Winchester Magnum, and 7.62×51mm NATO/.308 Winchester, which can be reconfigured in minutes by simply changing the barrel, bolt and magazine/insert. In addition the AX series consists of the non-multi calibre AX308 chambered in 7.62×51mm NATO/.308 Winchester and the AX50 chambered in .50 BMG.

=== AXMC ===
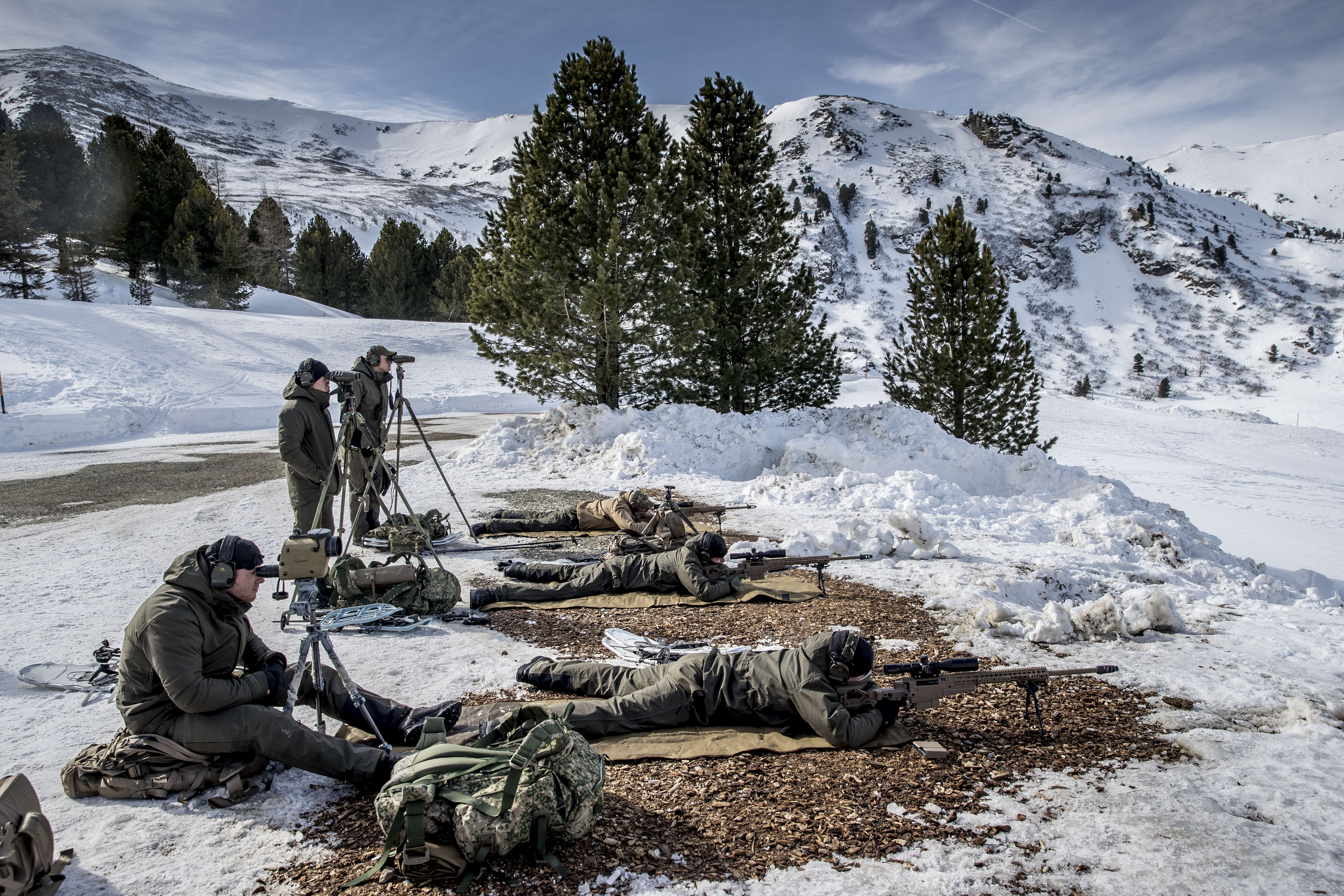
AXMC of the Dutch Army chambered for .338 Lapua Magnum during training in 2019

The AXMC multi calibre sniper rifle is chambered either for the .338 Lapua Magnum, .300 Winchester Magnum, 7.62×51mm NATO/.308 Winchester. It features parts that dimensionally or otherwise are not interchangeable with the AW rifle series. With an AXMC calibre conversion kit, the AXMC can change calibres in minutes by exchanging the bolts, magazines and barrels. Converting to the 7.62×51mm NATO cartridge, an additional magazine converter must also be fitted within the magazine port to allow the use of an Accuracy International AX308 magazine. A single shroud/firing pin assembly is provided for each multi calibre weapon system and must therefore be installed into the required bolt assembly as part of the conversion procedure.

Compared to the AWM, the bolt action of the AXMC is longer and wider and the internal magazine is lengthened, allowing the unimpaired use of .338 Lapua Magnum cartridges loaded to the C.I.P. (Permanent International Commission for the Proof of Firearms Portable) maximum allowed overall length of 93.50 mm (3.681 in).

The AXMC bolt is 22 mm (0.87 in) in diameter and the bolt, bolt head, locking ring and barrel tenon construction were designed to be significantly stronger and more capable of handling higher chamber pressures and temperatures and thus higher bolt thrust safely compared to the AWM variant. The bolt construction is significantly revised, allowing the bolt to be field stripped by hand and allowing the more complex removal of the bolt head from the bolt body with simple hand tools. Calibre changes can be accomplished by the change of a complete bolt assembly or a calibre specific bolt sleeve, which is more laborious. The interior of the bolt has a new safety feature added that will prevent the rifle from firing on a partially closed bolt. An improved leaf-spring AW 7.62 style extractor should enhance the cycling reliability of the bolt action. This extractor can be removed and reinstalled with the help of a bullet tip. The top of the receiver features a MIL-STD 1913 Picatinny rail for mounting aiming optics. The AXMC has a 30 MOA forward canted optical rail optimised for extreme long range shooting. The diameter of the barrel threading was enlarged and is unique to the AXMC. The rifle is fitted with a 27 in (686 mm) long .338 in (8.6 mm) calibre free floating fluted barrel as standard. The AXMC has a non conventional 238 mm (1:9.35 in) twist rate to adequately stabilise longer, heavier .338 calibre very-low-drag projectile designs that became more common in the 21st century. Other barrel lengths, calibres and twist rates are available as options. The two-stage trigger has a new trigger shoe that can be moved for and rearwards by 0.5 in (13 mm) and has a 15 to 20 N (3.4 to 4.5 lb_{f}) adjustable trigger pull. The AXMC uses new 10-round double stacked .338 Lapua Magnum steel magazines that are inserted into a revised magazine well.

Further, the AXMC features a revised external chassis stock system with an octagonal shaped fore end which envelops the free floating barrel offering modular attachment points for user (re)movable MIL-STD 1913 Picatinny accessory rails on four sides. Several lengths of octagonal shaped fore end and Picatinny accessory rails are available as options. The folding rear of the stock can be fitted with an optional butt spike. The minimal possible length of pull was reduced compared to the AICS stocks to facilitate usage when wearing thick clothing or body armour. The stock has a left-right and height adjustable cheekpiece as standard or can be fitted with an optional quick adjustable cheekpiece. The cheekpiece contains a 4 mm hex wrench used for various adjustment, removal and (re)mounting procedures. The pistol grip can be fitted with backstraps of differing sizes that combined with the movable trigger shoe enables the trigger to be tailored to the individual shooter.

==== AXSR ====
In 2025 a further developed variant of the AXMC and the short-lived (European market) AX Mk III rifle series is marketed as the long action AXSR and can be chambered for:

- .338 Lapua Magnum 1:9.35 in twist rate
- .338 Norma Magnum 1:9.35 in twist rate
- .300 Norma Magnum 1:8 in twist rate
- .300 PRC 1:8 in twist rate
- .300 Winchester Magnum 1:10 in twist rate

The standard barrels are 27 in long, except the .300 Winchester Magnum which is 26 in long and feature B&T provided muzzle brakes. The rifles are on request available in .308 Winchester and 6.5 Creedmoor short action chamberings, other barrel lengths and M-LOK forends.

The AXSR series features a new two-position ambidextrous safety and the AX Mk III introduced ARCA Swiss style tripod rail interface.

=== AX308 ===
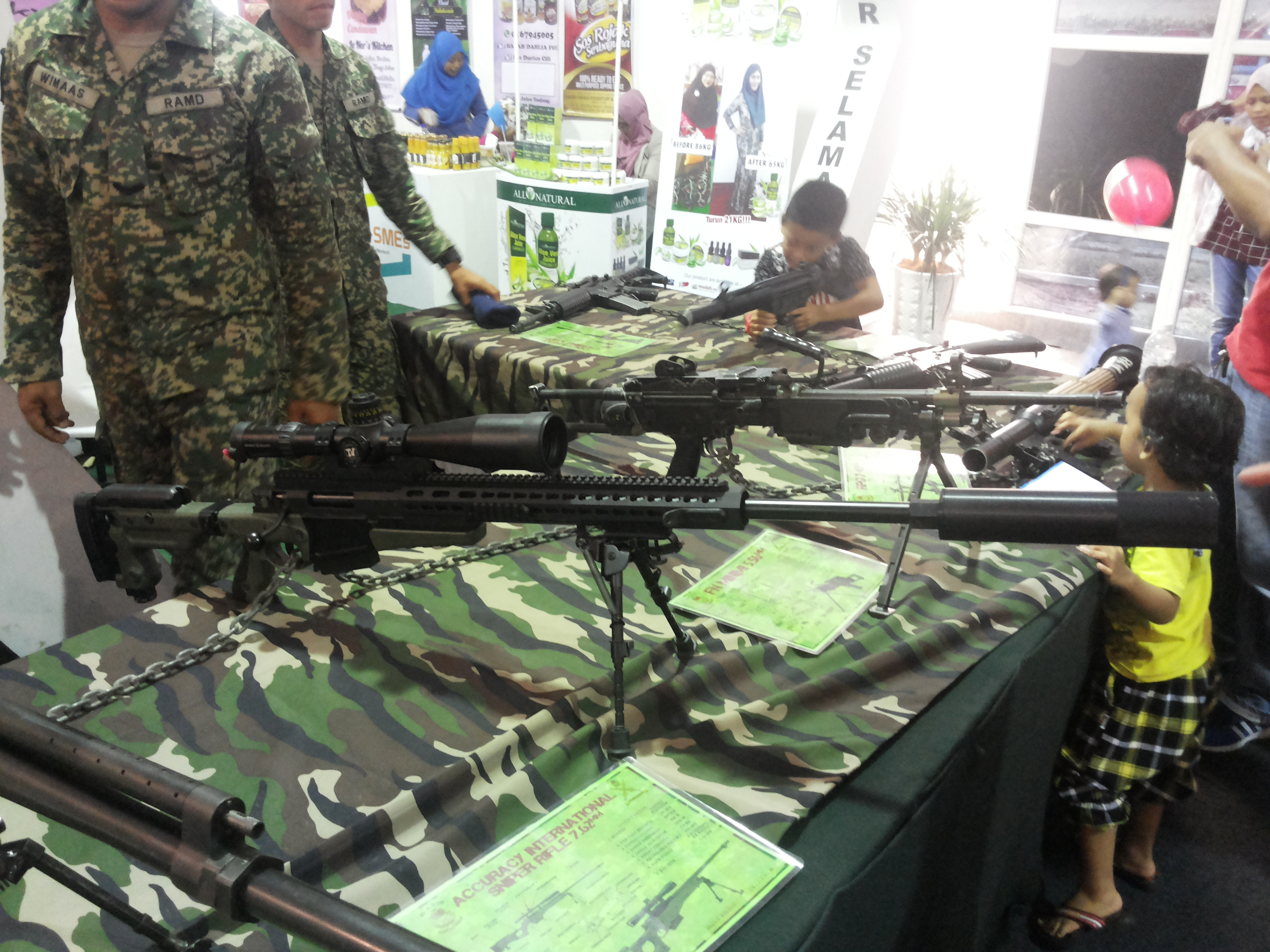
AX308 of the Malaysian Army with a suppressor attached

The AX308 is a stand-alone 7.62×51mm NATO variant. It is chambered in 7.62×51mm NATO/.308 Winchester and has a smaller short action with a bolt diameter of 20 mm (0.79 in). The AX308 has a 20 MOA forward canted optical rail optimised for long range shooting.

=== AX50 ===
The AX50 is a stand-alone .50 BMG (12.7×99mm NATO) anti-materiel rifle variant that replaced the AW50. It has a bolt diameter of 30 mm (1.18 in).

== Users (7.62×51mm NATO or smaller chamberings) ==
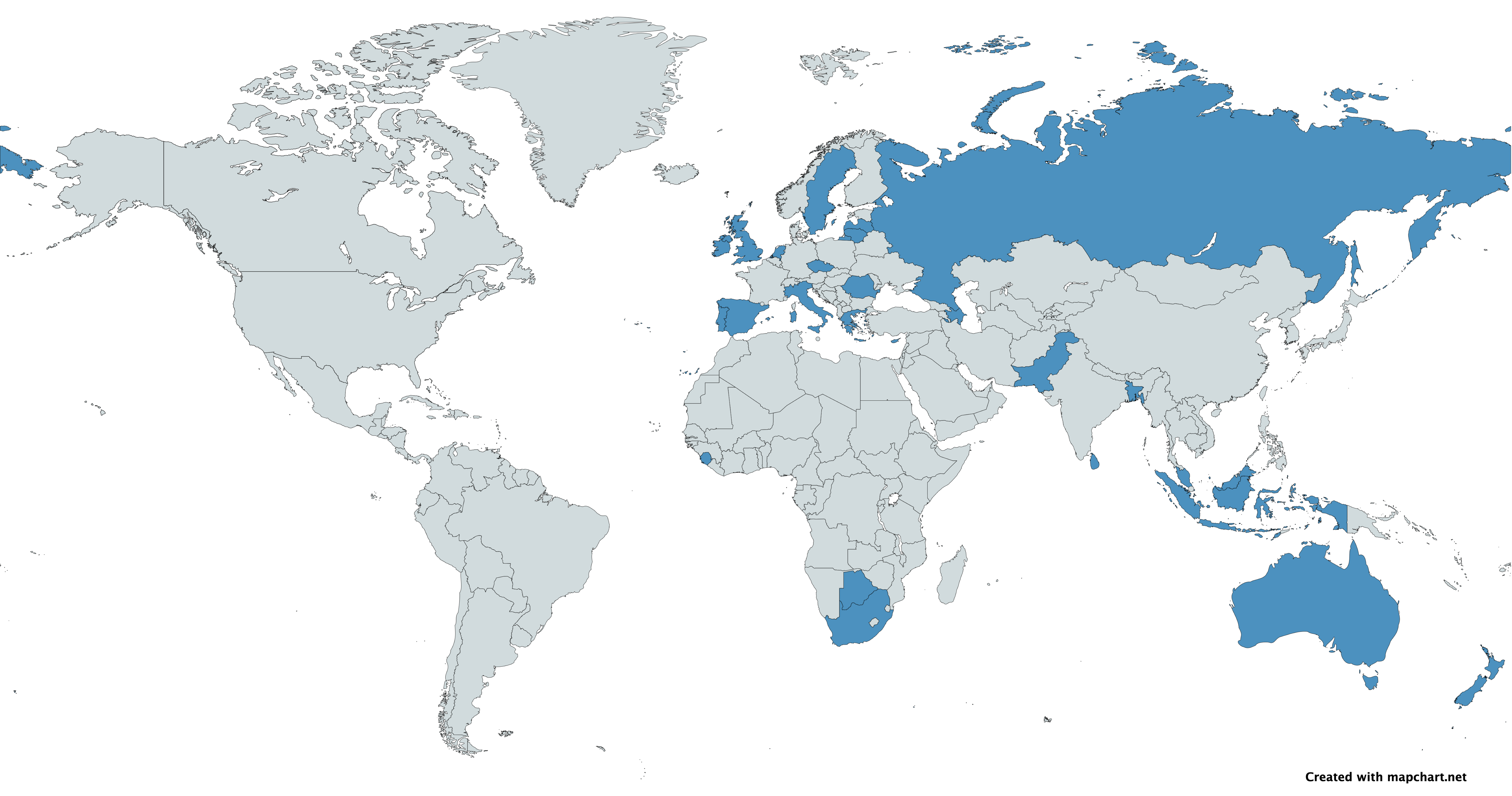
Map with Arctic Warfare users in blue

- Australia: Australian Defence Force with folding stock designated as the SR-98.
- Azerbaijan: Azerbaijani Special Forces and State Border Service (DSX)
- Bangladesh: Used by Bangladesh Army special sniper unit Black Eagle.
- Botswana
- Cyprus: AXMC variant used by Cypriot Special Forces.
- Czech Republic: Purchased a number of AWF rifles, mainly for the use of Special Forces.
- Greece: Special Anti-Terrorist Unit (EKAM)
- Indonesia: AW and AX308 version used by the Indonesian National Armed Forces.
- Ireland: Irish Army, including Army Ranger Wing
- Italy: PM variant. The AWS variant is used by the 9th Parachute Assault Regiment and the AWP variant is used by the Carabinieri.
- Latvia
- Lithuania
- Malaysia: PM and AW variants are used by the Malaysian Special Operations Force.
- Netherlands: Korps Commandotroepen, Korps Mariniers, 11th Airmobile Brigade (Netherlands) (few AW, AWC and AXMC 7.62×51mm NATO chambered arms available).
- New Zealand
- Pakistan: Used by Special Services Group of Pakistan Army.
- Portugal: AI AWSF and AI AXMC versions are in use with Portuguese Army.
- Romania: AWP entered in the Brigada Antiteroristă in 1999.
- Russia: Used by the Ministry of Internal Affairs of Russia and Federal Security Service of Russia.
- Sierra Leone: Sierra Leone Police
- South Africa: South African Police Service Special Task Force and South African Special Forces
- Spain
- Sri Lanka
- Sweden: Adopted the AW rifle in 1988, designated as the Psg 90.
- Syria: .338 Lapua Magnum version. Used by special forces.
- United Kingdom: L96A1 (Precision Marksman) entered service in the British Armed Forces in 1985. L118A1 (Arctic Warfare) adopted for UKSF use in the 1990s.
- United States: United States Armed Forces use it designated as the Mk 13 rifle

== In popular culture ==
The Arctic Warfare Police, or simply AWP, version of the Accuracy International Arctic Warfare rifle has been frequently featured in popular first-person shooter video games such as Counter-Strike and Call of Duty. It is usually portrayed as a sniper rifle for long range sniping and requires precision.
