= Schmidt & Bender =

German company

Schmidt & Bender GmbH & Co. KG
- Type: Gesellschaft mit beschränkter Haftung
- Founded: 1957
- Headquarters: Biebertal, Hesse, Germany
- Key people: Sabine Bender-Gerlach; Udo H. Bender; Karlheinz Gerlach
- Products: High end riflescopes
- Number of employees: 60 (Germany) 80 (Hungary)
- Website: schmidtundbender.de

Schmidt & Bender (often abbreviated as S&B) is a German company specialized in producing high-end telescopic sights for hunting, sports, law enforcement and military arms.

The company was founded in 1957 by instrument maker Helmut Schmidt and master instrument maker Helmut Bender. The company started with producing telescopic sights for large German (mail order) hunting equipment sales chains under various brand names and gradually started to produce telescopic sights under their own brand name. As of 2008, the company was still a family enterprise.

Schmidt & Bender is an ISO 9001 certified company.

== Schmidt & Bender Hungaria Optik ==
In 1992 Schmidt & Bender Hungaria Optik GmbH in Budapest, Hungary was founded as an independent company by Schmidt & Bender GmbH & Co. KG, Biebertal, Germany. The process of privatisation in Hungary made it possible for Schmidt & Bender to buy the production of precision optics and fibre optics from the government-owned enterprise of the Hungarian Opticai Works (MOM). Schmidt & Bender bought Hungarian Opticai Works since this company produced and still produces the optical components Schmidt & Bender uses in their rifle scopes. In 2008 Schmidt & Bender Hungaria Optik employed 80 people.

The fixed magnification models of the Schmidt & Bender Classic product line can be either "Made in Germany" or "Made in Hungary".

== Products ==
Schmidt & Bender offers telescopic sights in three major groups and that are those meant for hunters, for sport and others meant for professional use (Military, Police, Security). As of 2019 the following series are available:

Hunting rifle telescopic sights

- Classic product line designed for hunting.
- Precision Hunter line. These scopes are produced on special order and based on Classic line scopes, each equipped with a top-mounted bullet drop compensator and reticles designed for accurate shooting at longer ranges.
- Zenith product line designed for hunting.
- Summit scope with 1 inch tube
- Stratos product line
- Polar T96 product line
- Exos product line

Sport rifle telescopic sights

- Sport line designed for field target sports shooters.

Professional rifle telescopic sights

- Police Marksman (PM) product line designed for the military and law enforcement.
- Police Marksman II (PM II) product line designed for the military and law enforcement.
- PM II ShortDot, product line with wide angle telescopic sights
- PM II High Power, product line with high zoom factors
- PM II Ultra Short, product line with short overall length
- PM II Ultra Bright, product line with high light transmission rate (similar in design to Polar T96 scopes)
- PM II High Power Digital BT with integrated display
- MILITARY MK II product line designed for the military. These telescopic sights are essentially PM II models with an additional laser filtration lens coating to protect operators against being wounded/blinded by laser light sources. The MILITARY MK II telescopic sights are marketed by sniper rifle manufacturer Accuracy International and have the Accuracy International company logo depicted on a turret.

For some models the option exists to have mounting rails underneath the riflescope to provide for mounting solutions that do not use scope rings. These rails are an integral part of the scope body and can not be removed. The most recent rail mounting system of Schmidt & Bender is their proprietary "Convex rail". The Convex rail uses matching slide-in mount fasteners to connect the riflescope to the gun and offers the possibility to tilt the scope up to 1° to the left or right. Since 2017 Schmidt & Bender also offer the Zeiss rail system on some of their hunting telescopic sights in the following series: Exos, Polar T96 and Stratos. The telescopic sights equipped with the Zeiss mounting rail are marked LMZ (Light Metal with Z-rail) in the Schmidt & Bender catalogs.

=== Sniper rifle manufacturers using Schmidt & Bender ===
The British high end factory sniper rifle manufacturer Accuracy International actively promotes fitting the Schmidt & Bender PM II / MILITARY MK II product line as sighting components on their Arctic Warfare family of sniper rifles and sells these products as accessories.

The Swiss fire arms manufacturer Brügger & Thomet (B&T) uses specially made Schmidt & Bender 3-12x50 PM II LP product line scopes with a B&T designed TRS reticle pattern for their APR bolt-action sniper rifles.

The German fire arms manufacturer Heckler & Koch (H&K) uses Schmidt & Bender 3-12x50 PM II telescopic sights as standard aiming optics for their PSG1A1 semi-automatic sniper rifles.

== Gallery ==
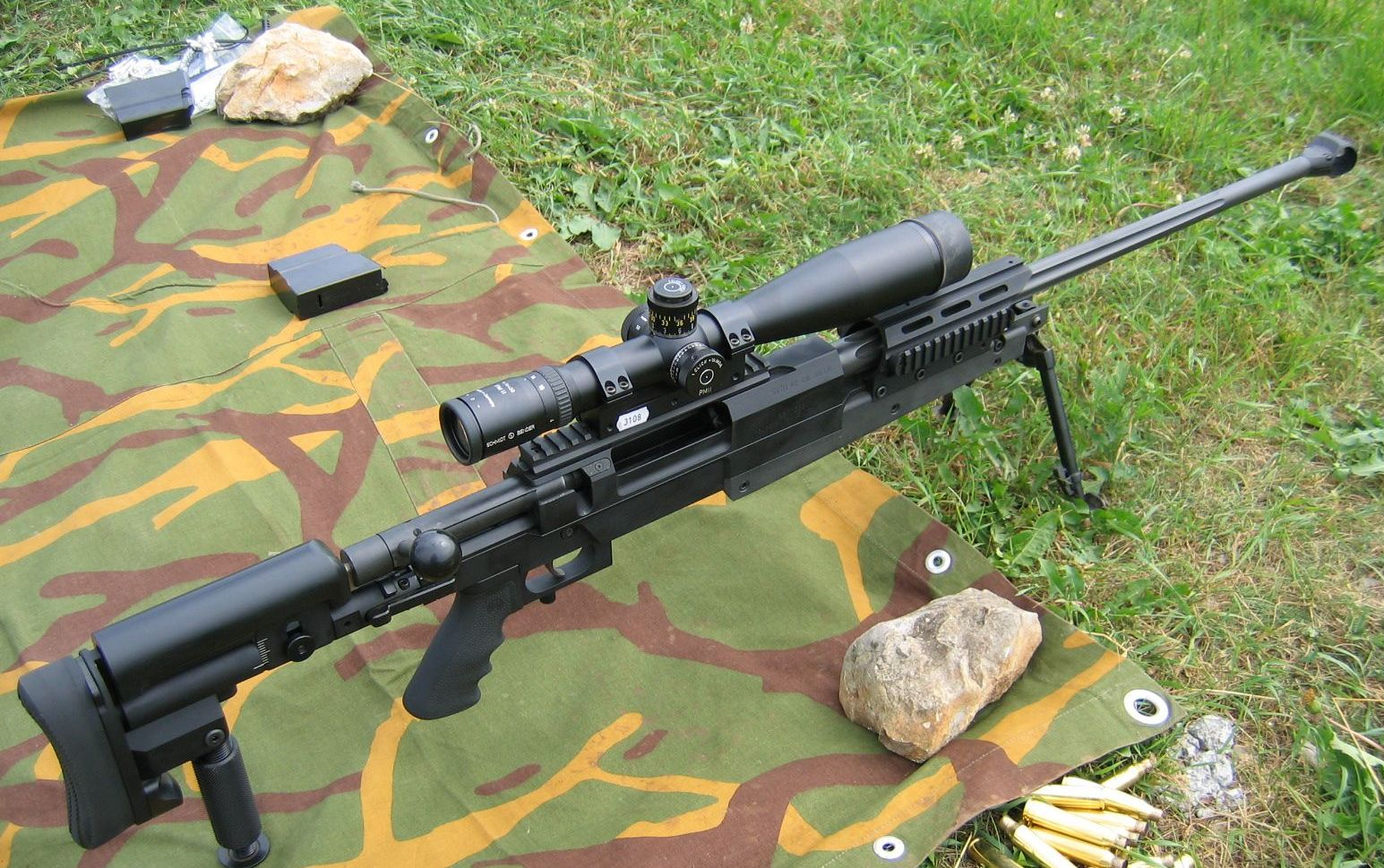
Schmidt & Bender 3-12x50 PM II P telescopic sight fitted with scope rings on a PGM .338 LM sniper rifle.

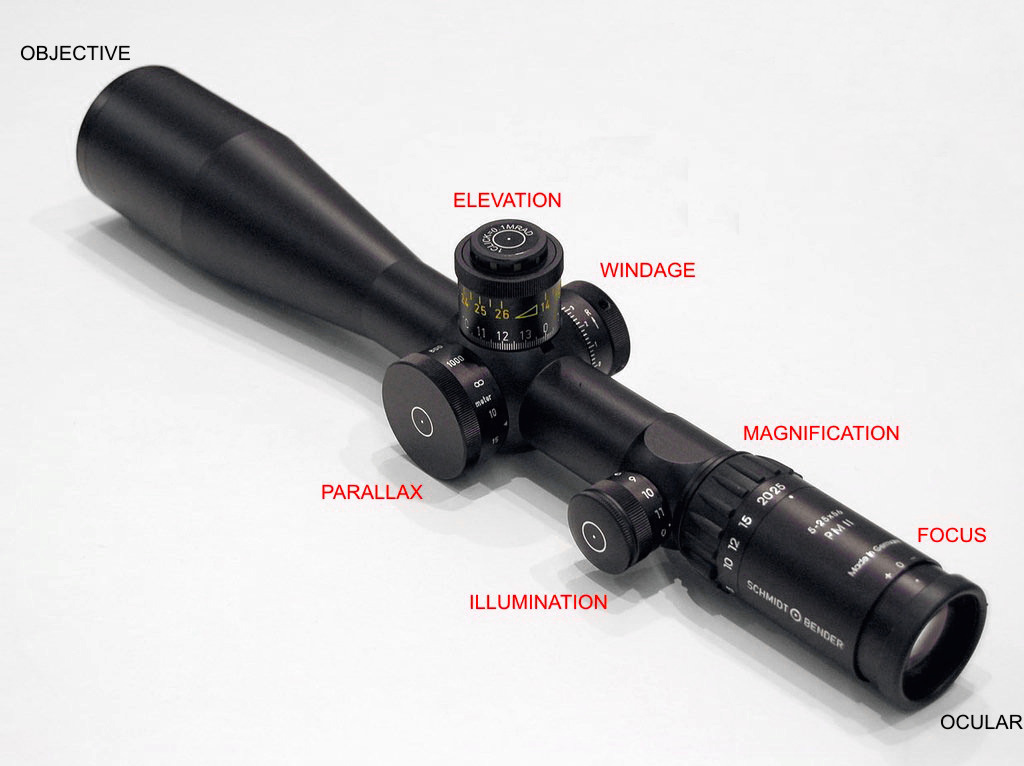
Schmidt & Bender 5-25x56 PM II LP telescopic sight and its adjustment controls.

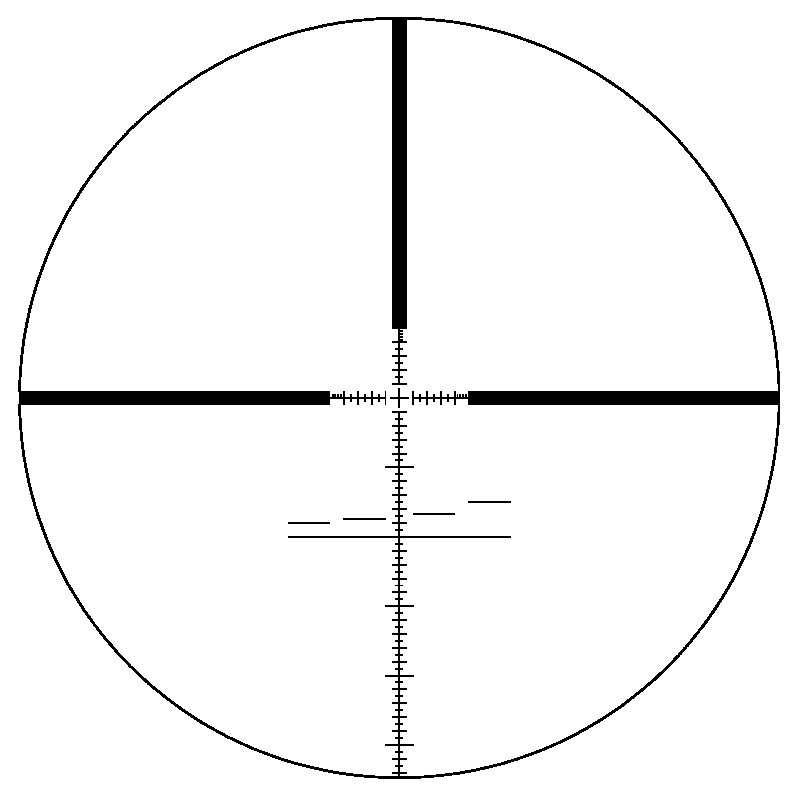
The P4 stadiametric rangefinding reticle as used in the Schmidt & Bender 5-25x56 PM II LP at 5x zoom.

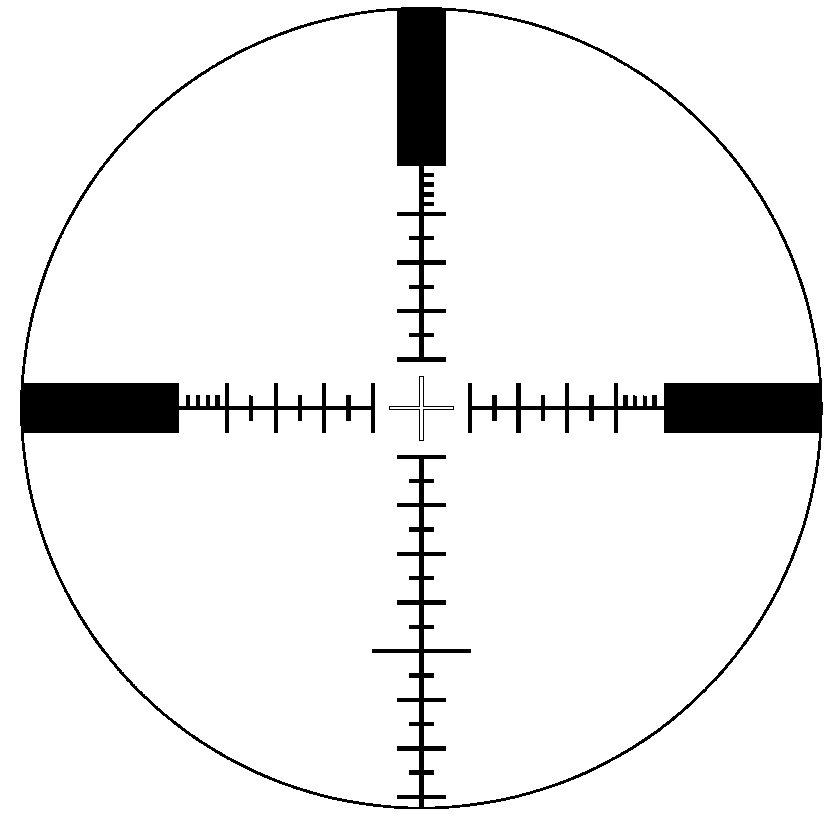
The P4 stadiametric rangefinding reticle as used in the Schmidt & Bender 5-25x56 PM II LP at 25x zoom.
