= List of anti-materiel rifles =

The following is a list of anti-materiel rifles: sniper rifles that fire large caliber ammunition used primarily for engaging materiel, rather than personnel.

Name	Country	Image	Year	Action	Cartridge
Steyr HS .50	Austria		2004	Bolt action	.460 Steyr.50 BMG
Steyr IWS 2000	Austria		1980	Bolt action	15.2×169mm proprietary Steyr APFSDS
Istiglal	AZE		2008	Semi-automatic	14.5×114mm
CDX-50	Canada			Bolt action	.416 Barrett.50 BMG
CDX-X60	Canada			Bolt action	12.7×114mm 14.5×114mm
AMR-2	China		2000	Bolt action	12.7×108mm
QBU-10	China		2009	Semi-automatic	12.7×108mm
QBU-201	China		2021	Bolt action	12.7×108mm
Norinco LG5	China		2011	Semi-automatic	40×53mm HV; 35×32mm SR
Zijiang M99	China		2005	Semi-automatic	.50 BMG; 12.7×108mm
HSARI LR-2	China		2012	Bolt action	12.7x108mm
RT-20	Croatia		1993	Bolt action	20×110mm Hispano
Mambi AMR	Cuba		1981	Semi-automatic	14.5×114mm
Falcon	Czech Republic		1998	Bolt action	.50 BMG; 12.7×108mm
Lahti L-39	Finland		1939	Gas-operated	20×138mmB
PGM Hecate II	France		1993	Bolt action	.50 BMG
PDSHP	Georgia		2014	Bolt action Semi-automatic	12.7×108mm
Satevari MSWP	Georgia		2015	Bolt action	.50 BMG
DSR-Precision DSR-50	GER		2003	Bolt action	.50 BMG
Mauser Tankgewehr M1918	German Empire		1918	Bolt action	13.2mm TuF
Gepárd anti-materiel rifle	Hungary		1987	Bolt action Semi-automatic	.50 BMG 12.7×108mm 14.5×114mm
Vidhwansak	India		2005	Bolt action	12.7×108mm 14.5×114mm 20×82mm
Pindad SPR-2	IDN		2007	Bolt action	.50 BMG
Arash	Iran		2013	Semi-automatic	20×102mm
Baher	Iran		2015		23×152mm
Nasr	Iran		2016		12.7×108mm
Shaher	Iran		2012	Bolt action	14.5×114mm
AM-50 Sayyad	Iran		2008	Bolt action	.50 BMG
Golan S-01	Syria		2015	Bolt action	12.7×108mm
Type 97	Empire of Japan		1935	Semi-automatic	20×125mm
Panzerbüchse	Nazi Germany		1939	Falling-block action	7.92×94mm Patronen
Wz. 35	Poland		1935	Bolt action	7.92×107mm DS
WKW Tor	Poland		2005	Bolt action	.50 BMG
KSVK	Russia		1997	Bolt action	12.7×108mm
Orsis T-5000	Russia		2011	Bolt action	12.7×108mm
OSV-96	Russia		2000	Semi-automatic	12.7×108mm
SV-18	Russia		2019	Bolt action	.50 BMG; 12.7×108mm
PTRD-41	Soviet Union		1941	Bolt action	14.5×114mm
PTRS-41	Soviet Union		1941	Semi-automatic	14.5×114mm
Zastava M93 Black Arrow	Serbia		1998	Bolt action	.50 BMG; 12.7×108mm
Zastava M12 Black Spear	Serbia		2022	Bolt action	.50 BMG; 12.7×108mm
SNT Motiv STSR20	South Korea		2018	Semi-automatic	.50 BMG
Denel NTW-20	South Africa		1998	Bolt action	14.5×114mm (NTW 14.5); 20×82mm (NTW 20); 20×110mm Hispano (NTW 20)
Neopup PAW-20	South Africa		2015	Rotating bolt	20×42mm
SAN 511 (formerly OM 50 Nemesis)	Switzerland		2001	Bolt action	.50 BMG
Solothurn S-18/1000	Switzerland		1939	Semi-automatic	20×138mmB
T112 heavy sniper rifle	Taiwan		2024	Bolt action	.50 BMG
Snipex Alligator	Ukraine		2020	Bolt action	14.5×114mm
Snipex M	Ukraine		2017	Rotating bolt	12.7×108mm
Snipex Rhino Hunter	Ukraine		2016	Bolt action	.50 BMG
Snipex T-Rex	Ukraine		2017	Bolt action	14.5×114mm
MCR Horizon's Lord	Ukraine		2015	Bolt action	.416 Barrett.460 Steyr.50 BMG; 12.7×108mm 12.7×114mm "HL"; 14.5×114mm 23×115mm
CSR 50	UAE		2013	Bolt action	.50 BMG
RPA Rangemaster	United Kingdom		2001	Bolt action	.50 BMG
Accuracy International AW50	United Kingdom		2000	Bolt action	.50 BMG
Accuracy International AS50	United Kingdom		2007	Semi-automatic	.50 BMG
Accuracy International AX50	United Kingdom		2010	Bolt action	.50 BMG
Cyclone HSR	United Kingdom		2017	Bolt action	.50 BMG
SC-127 Thunderbolt	United Kingdom		2014	Bolt action	.50 BMG
Anzio 20mm rifle	United States		2006	Bolt action	20×102mm Vulcan
Barrett M82	United States		1989	Semi-automatic	.50 BMG
Barrett M90	United States		1990	Bolt action	.50 BMG
Barrett M95	United States		1995	Bolt action	.50 BMG
Barrett M99	United States		1999	Bolt action	.416 Barrett.50 BMG
Barrett XM109	United States		2004	Semi-automatic	25×59mm
Barrett XM500	United States		2006	Semi-automatic	.50 BMG
Desert Tech HTI	United States		2012	Bolt action	.50 BMG
Harris Gun Works M-96	United States	Harris Gun Works M-96 (On Top)	1990	Semi-automatic	.50 BMG
Iver Johnson AMAC-1500	United States		1981		.50 BMG
Leader 50 A1	United States		2012	Semi-automatic	.50 BMG
McMillan Tac-50	United States		2000	Bolt action	.50 BMG
Robar RC-50	United States		1985	Bolt action	.50 BMG
Bushmaster BA50 Rifle	United States		2003	Semi-automatic	.50 BMG
Grizzly Big Boar	United States		1995	Bolt action	.50 BMG
ArmaLite AR-50	United States		1997	Bolt action	.50 BMG
Pauza P-50	United States		1990	Gas operation, tilting bolt	.50 BMG

== See also ==
- Anti-material pistol
- Lists of weapons
- List of firearms
- List of assault rifles
- List of battle rifles
- List of carbines
- List of machine guns
- List of multiple-barrel firearms
- List of pistols
- List of semi-automatic pistols
- List of revolvers
- List of sniper rifles
- List of grenade launchers
