= List of equipment of the Peshmerga =

Equipment of the Internal Security Forces in Kurdistan

The following is a list of equipment currently in use with the Peshmerga (The Internal Security Forces of the Kurdistan Region). It includes small arms, vehicles, artillery, anti-aircraft guns, and aircraft.

== Current equipment ==
=== Small arms ===
Photo	Name	Origin	Type	Caliber	Quantity	Notes
Pistols
	P1	West Germany	Semi-automatic pistol	9×19mm Parabellum		8,000+ in aid.
Glock 19	Glock 19	Austria	Semi-automatic pistol	9×19mm Parabellum	N/A	
Rifles and carbines
	vz. 58	Czechoslovakia	Assault rifle	7.62×39mm	Thousands	
	AK-47	Soviet Union	Assault rifle	7.62×39mm	Thousands	
	AKM	Soviet Union	Assault rifle	7.62×39mm	Thousands	
	M16	United States	Assault rifle	5.56×45mm NATO	Thousands	4,400+ in aid. M16A4 variant used.
	M4	United States	Carbine	5.56×45mm NATO	Thousands	14,400+ in aid.
	Heckler & Koch G36	Germany	Assault rifle	5.56×45mm NATO	Thousands	13,000+ in aid.
	Heckler & Koch G3	West Germany	Battle rifle	7.62×51mm NATO	Thousands	11,000+ in aid.
	SVD	Soviet Union	Designated marksman rifle	7.62×54mmR	Thousands	
	Zijiang M99	China	Anti-materiel rifle	12.7×108mm		
Machine guns
	PKM	Soviet Union	General-purpose machine gun	7.62×54mmR		
	M240B	United States	General-purpose machine gun	7.62×51mm NATO	Hundreds	186+ in aid.
	MG 42	Nazi Germany	General-purpose machine gun	7.92×57mm Mauser	Hundreds	100+ in aid.
	Rheinmetall MG3	West Germany	General-purpose machine gun	7.62×51mm NATO	Hundreds	47+ in aid. Includes the Beretta MG 42/59 variant.
	DShK	Soviet Union	Heavy machine gun	12.7×108mm	Thousands	
	M2 Browning	United States	Heavy machine gun	.50 BMG		86+ in aid.
Grenade launchers
	Neopup PAW-20	South Africa	Grenade launcher	20×42mm		
	Denel Y3 AGL	South Africa	Automatic grenade launcher	40×53mm		
	QLZ-87	China	Automatic grenade launcher	35×32mmSR		
Anti-tank weapons
	RPG-7	Soviet Union	Rocket-propelled grenade	40 mm	Thousands	
	Panzerfaust 3	West Germany	Rocket-propelled grenade	60 mm		450 launchers and 5,000 rockets.
	Carl Gustaf	Sweden	Recoilless rifle	84 mm		40+ in aid.
	SPG-9	Soviet Union	Recoilless rifle	73 mm		
	M40	United States	Recoilless rifle	105 mm		
	HJ-8	China	Anti-tank guided missile	120 mm		
	9M14 Malyutka	Soviet Union	Anti-tank guided missile	125 mm		
	9M113 Konkurs	Soviet Union	Anti-tank guided missile	135 mm		
	9M133 Kornet	Russia	Anti-tank guided missile	152 mm		
	MILAN	France; West Germany	Anti-tank guided missile	115 mm		30 launchers and 700 guided missiles.
	BGM-71 TOW	United States	Anti-tank guided missile	152 mm		

=== Combat vehicles ===
Photo	Name	Origin	Variant	Quantity	Notes
Main battle tanks
	T-54/T-55	Soviet Union		130	Most captured in 1991 and 2003.
	T-62	Soviet Union		100	
	T-72	Soviet Union		80	Most captured in 2003.
	Type 69	China		40	Most captured in 1991-2003.
Reconnaissance
	EE-9 Cascavel	Brazil			
Armoured personnel carriers
	MT-LB	Soviet Union			
	BRDM-2	Soviet Union			
	BMP-2	Soviet Union			
	BMP-1	Soviet Union			
	EE-11 Urutu	Brazil		2+	
	Type 63	China			
MRAPs
	Cougar	United States	6×6		
	BAE Caiman	United States			
	International MaxxPro	United States			
	IAG Guardian	United Arab Emirates			
	STREIT Group Spartan	United Arab Emirates			
	Reva	South Africa			
	Wer'wolf MKII	Namibia			
Utility vehicles
	Humvee	United States	M1151	Thousands	36 Humvees and 77 up-armored Humvees in 2017, around 48 in July and 226 in November 2021, supplied by the US
	ATF Dingo	Germany	Dingo 1	Up to 23	
	M1117	United States			
	Otokar Akrep	Turkey			
Armoured recovery vehicle
	Type 653 ARV	China		1+	
Logistic Trucks
	Navistar 7000 series	United States	Transport but some are used for the BM-21 Grad.		
	Unimog	Germany	Transport.		
	Ural-5323	Soviet Union	Transport.		

=== Artillery ===
Photo	Name	Origin	Type	Caliber	Quantity	Notes
Self-propelled artillery
	2S1 Gvodzika	Soviet Union	Self-propelled howitzer	122 mm		
Towed artillery
	M119	United States	Howitzer	105 mm	At least 60	36 supplied by the US in 2017, 24 in 2024
	D-30	Soviet Union	Howitzer	122 mm	At least 6	
	M-46	Soviet Union	Field gun	130 mm		
	D-20	Soviet Union	Gun-howitzer	152 mm		
	Type 59	China	Field gun	130 mm		
Multiple rocket launchers
	BM-21 Grad	Soviet Union	Self-propelled MRL	122 mm		
	Type 63	China	Towed MRL	107 mm		Mounted on technicals.
	HM20	Iran	Self-propelled MRL	122 mm		Iranian version of the BM-21 Grad
Mortars
	M224	United States	Light mortar	60 mm		
	M252	United Kingdom; United States	Medium mortar	81 mm		
	M120	Israel; United States	Heavy mortar	120 mm		

=== Air defense ===
Photo	Name	Origin	Caliber	Variant	Notes
Man-portable air-defense system
	9K32 Strela-2	Soviet Union	72 mm		
FN-6/FN-16 MANPADS launcher	FN-6	People's Republic of China	72 mm		
Anti-aircraft guns
	ZPU	Soviet Union	14.5×114mm	ZPU-1; ZPU-2; ZPU-4	Some mounted on technicals.
	ZU-23-2	Soviet Union	23 mm	ZU-23-2	
	AZP S-60	Soviet Union	57 mm		Some mounted on technicals.
	53T2 Tarasque	France	20 mm		Some mounted on technicals.
Self-propelled anti-aircraft guns
	ZSU-57-2	Soviet Union	57 mm		

=== Aircraft ===
Photo	Aircraft	Origin	Type	In service	Notes
Helicopters
	Eurocopter EC225	Multinational	Transport	At least 1	
	Eurocopter EC635	Portugal	Transport/CAS	N/A	Fitted with the Paramount Group FLASH (Flexible Light Armaments System for Helicopters) upgrade. Most probably provided by Jordan.
	Airbus H135	France	Transport	3+	
	AS350B3	France	Transport	3	
	MD Helicopters MD-530F	United States	Transport	2+	
	Eurocopter EC120 Colibri	France	Transport-Training	N/A	

=== Personal Gear ===
Photo	Name	Origin	Type	Quantity	Notes
Protective Gear
	Gefechtshelm M92	Germany	Combat helmet	4,000+	
	Personnel Armor System for Ground Troops	United States	Combat Helmet	N/A	As seen in the provided photo.
	Interceptor Body Armor	United States of America	Body armor	N/A	As seen in some photos.
Camouflage
	U.S. Woodland	United States of America	Military Camouflage	N/A	Peshmerga troops can be seen wearing the camouflage in certain images as seen here.
	Desert Camouflage Uniform	United States of America	Military Camouflage	N/A	
Communications
	SEM 52S mobile radios	Germany	Radio	700	
Tactical Equipment
	Zeiss Fero Z-51	Germany	Night-vision device	680	

== Gallery ==
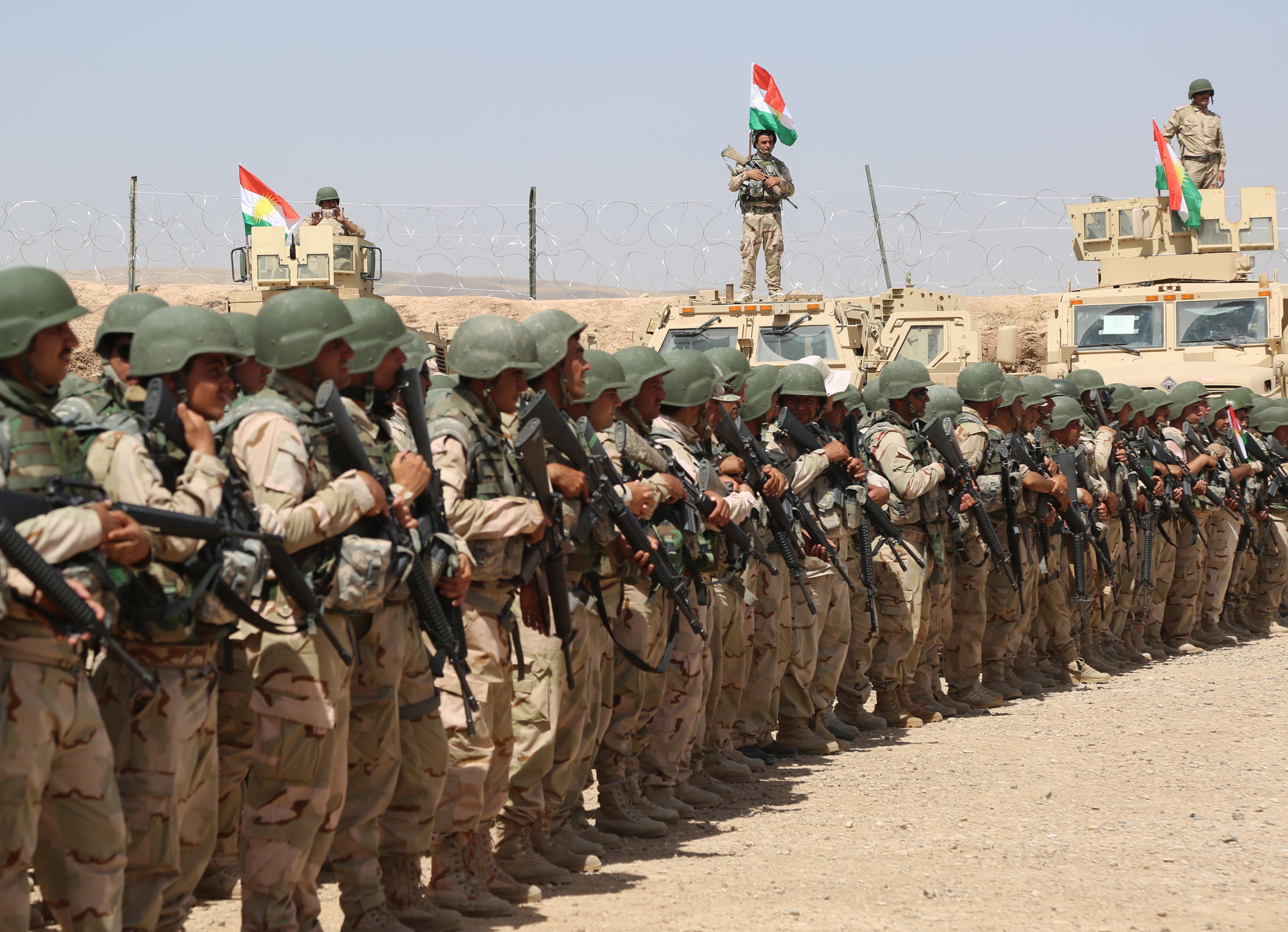
Peshmerga soldiers stand in formation during the Modern Brigade Course graduation ceremony.

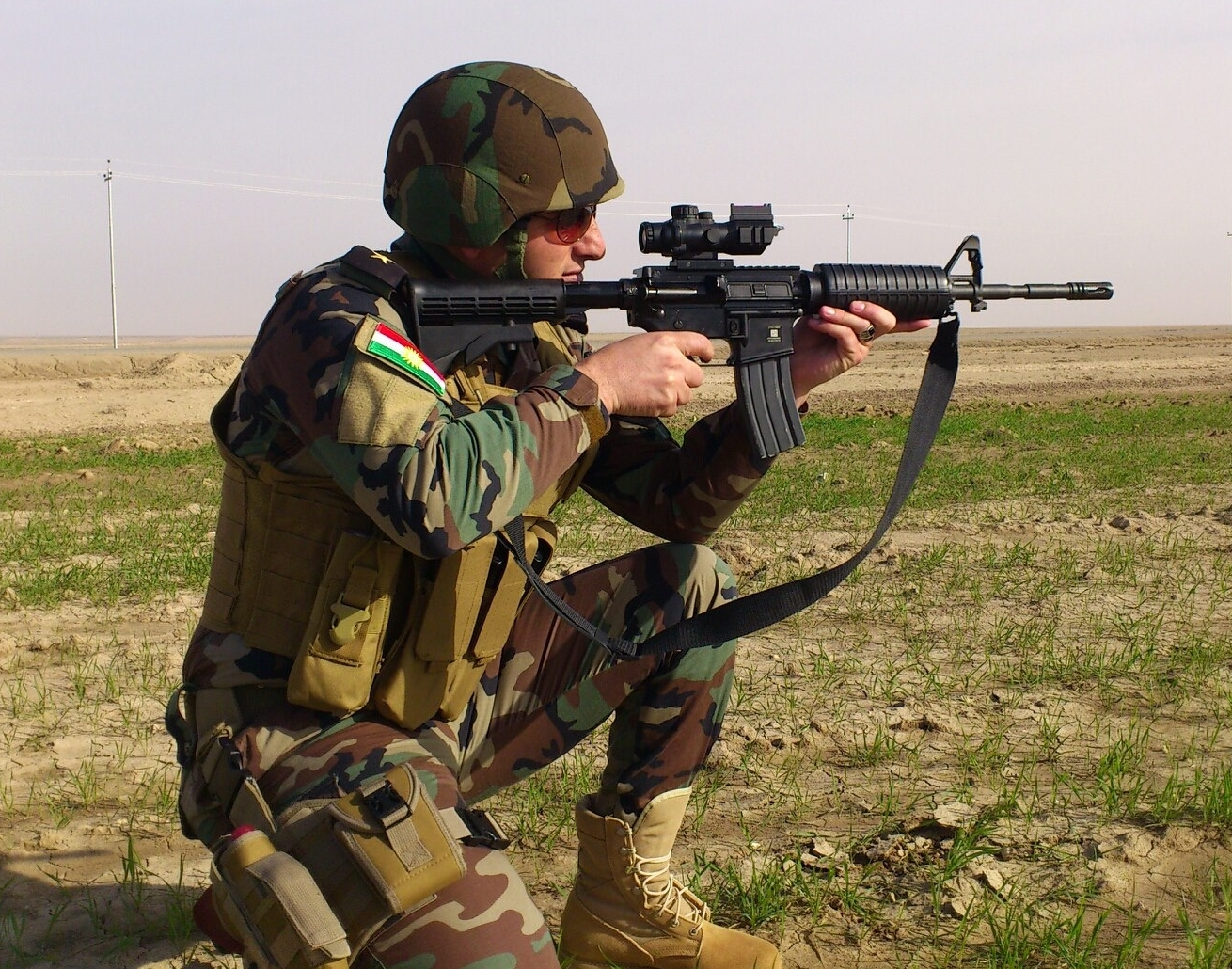
Peshmerga soldier operating an M4 carbine.

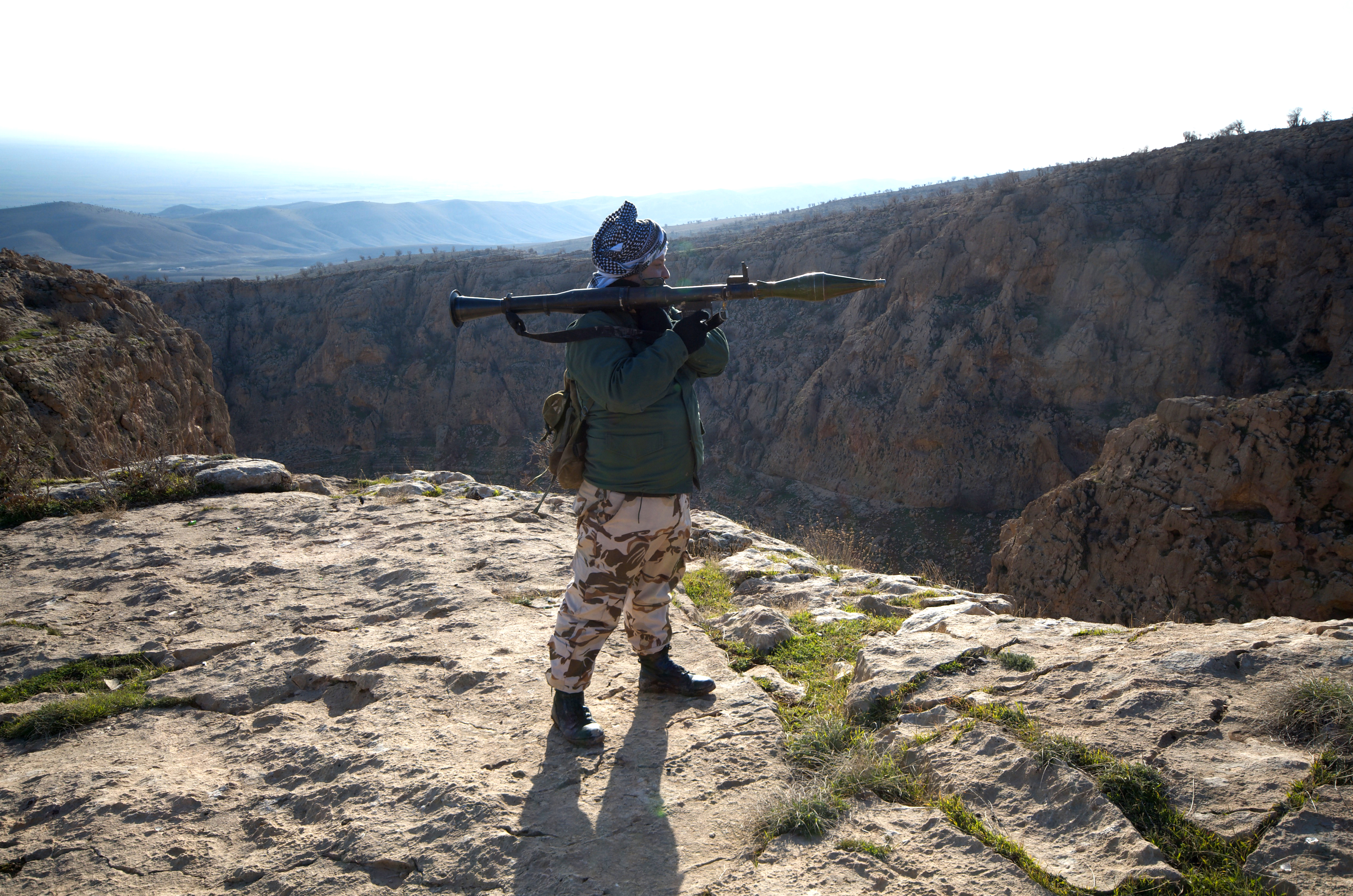
Peshmerga fighter aiming through an RPG-7 in Sinjar.

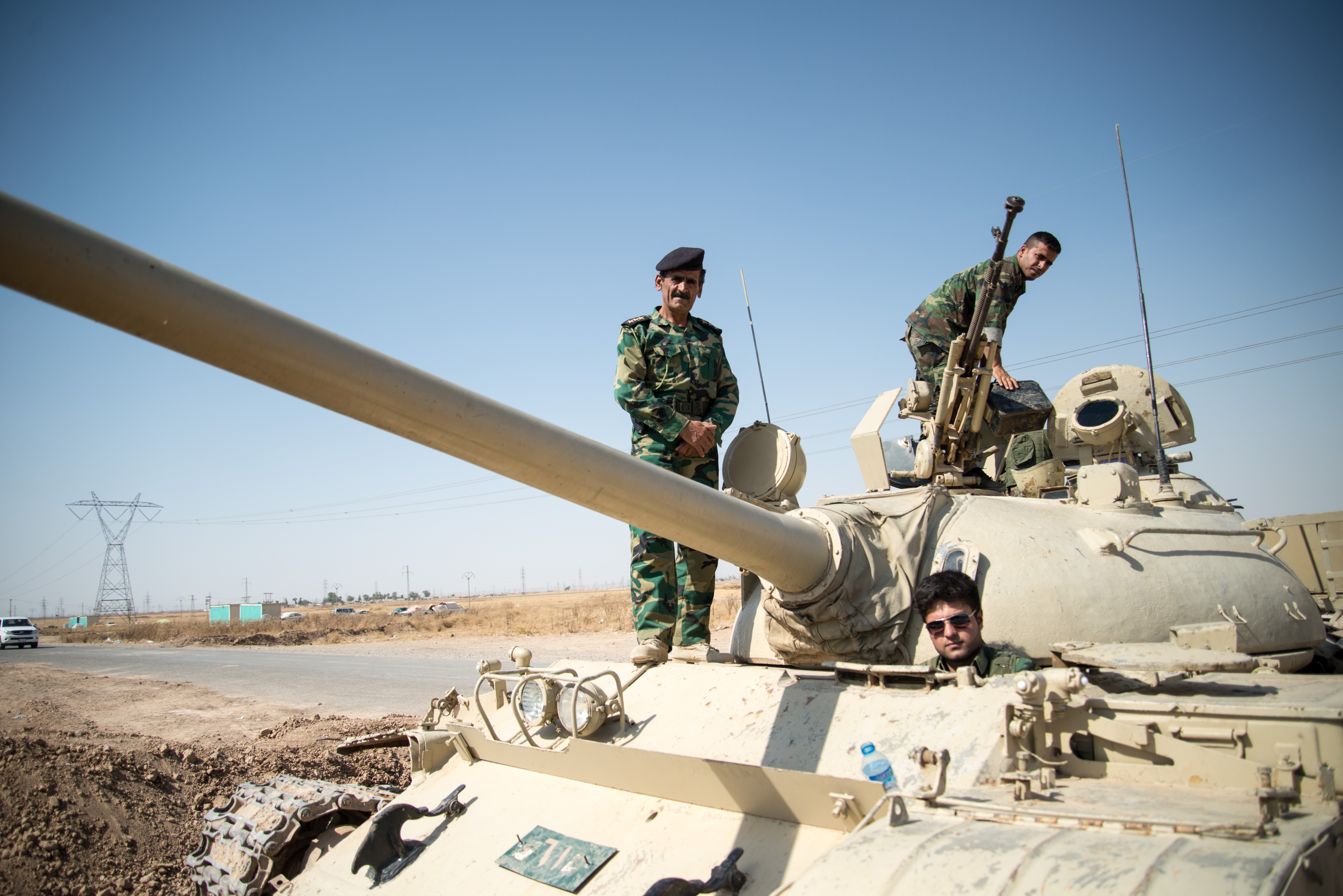
Peshmerga on a T-55 Tank outside Kirkuk.

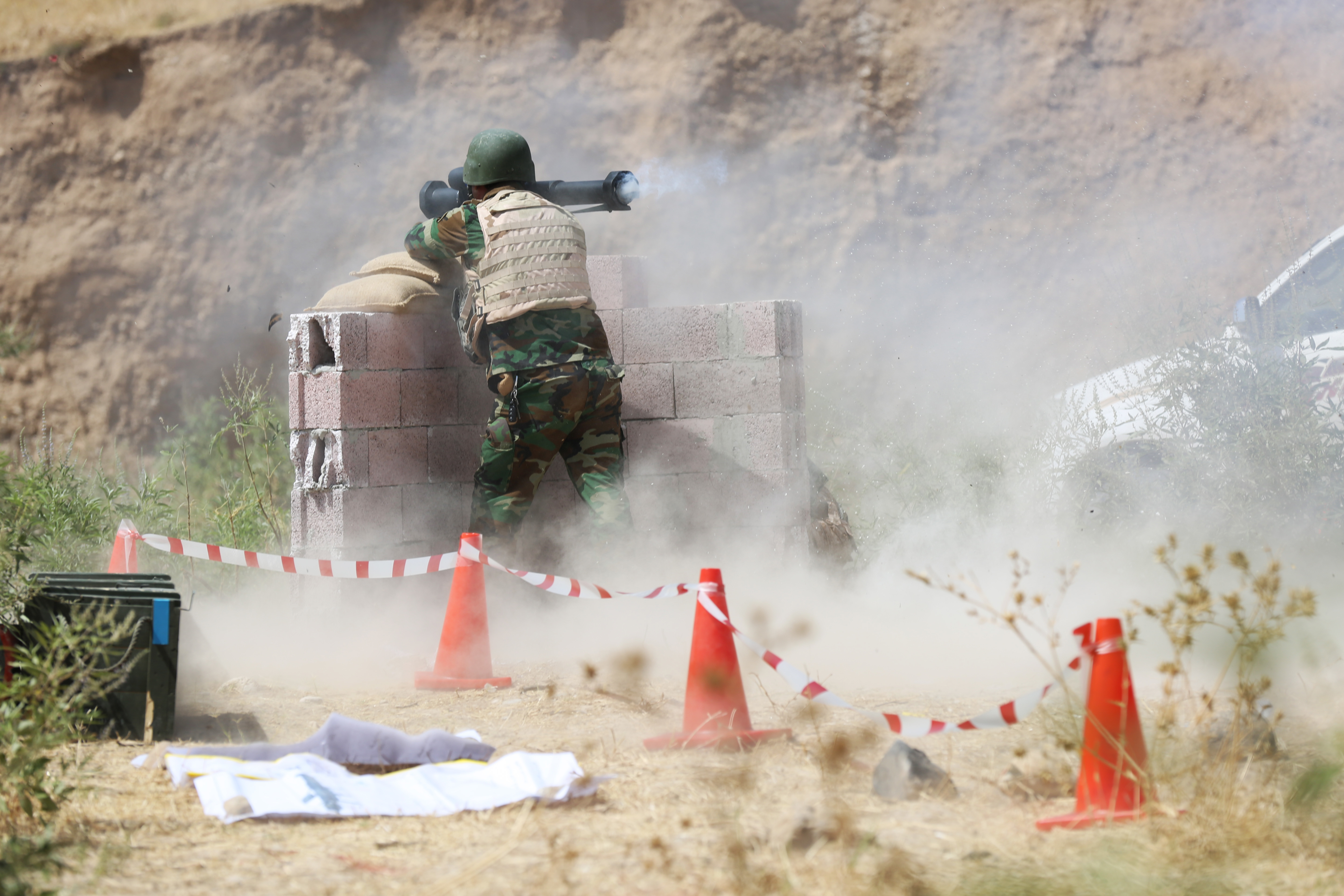
Peshmerga shoots a Panzerfaust 3 during training.

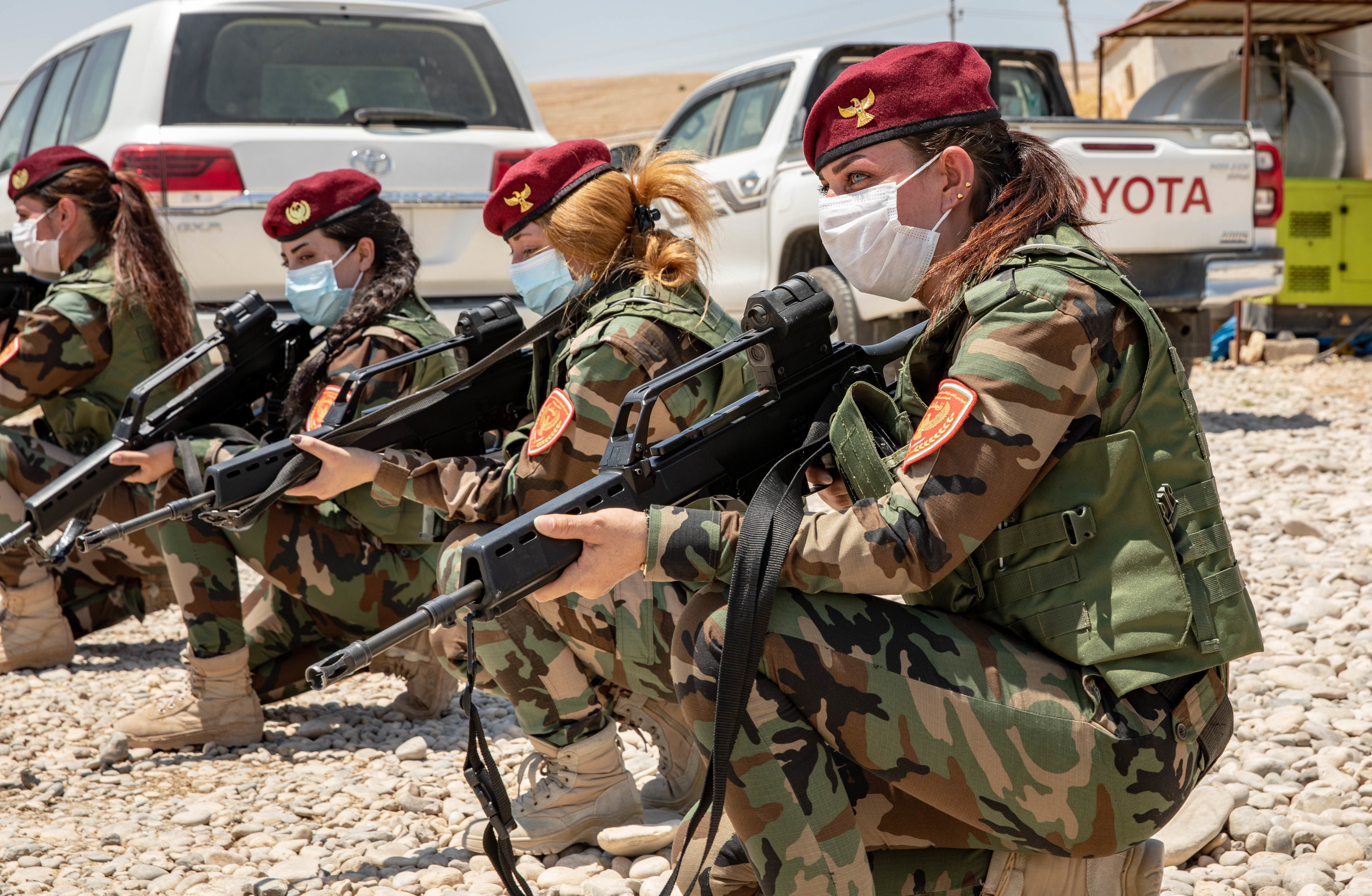
Female Peshmerga soldiers training with G36's.

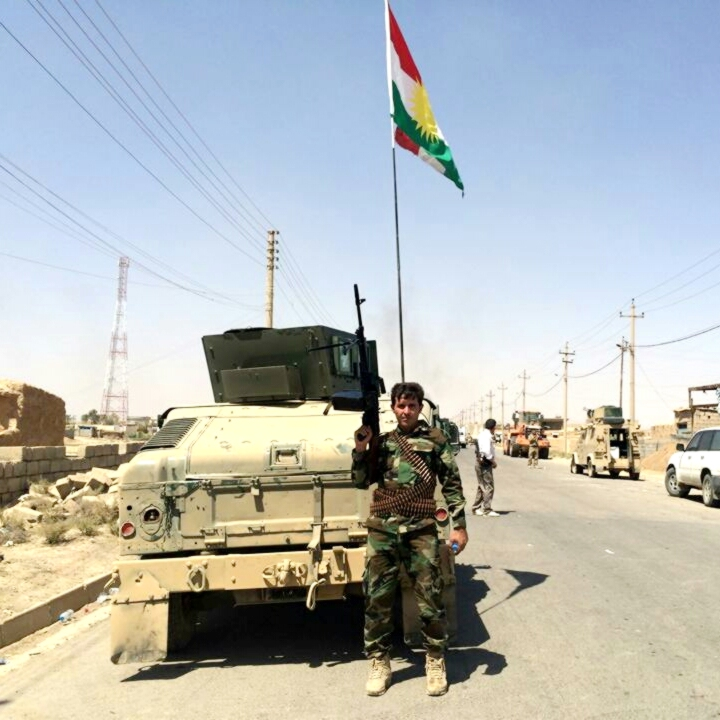
Peshmerga soldier standing in front of a Humvee.

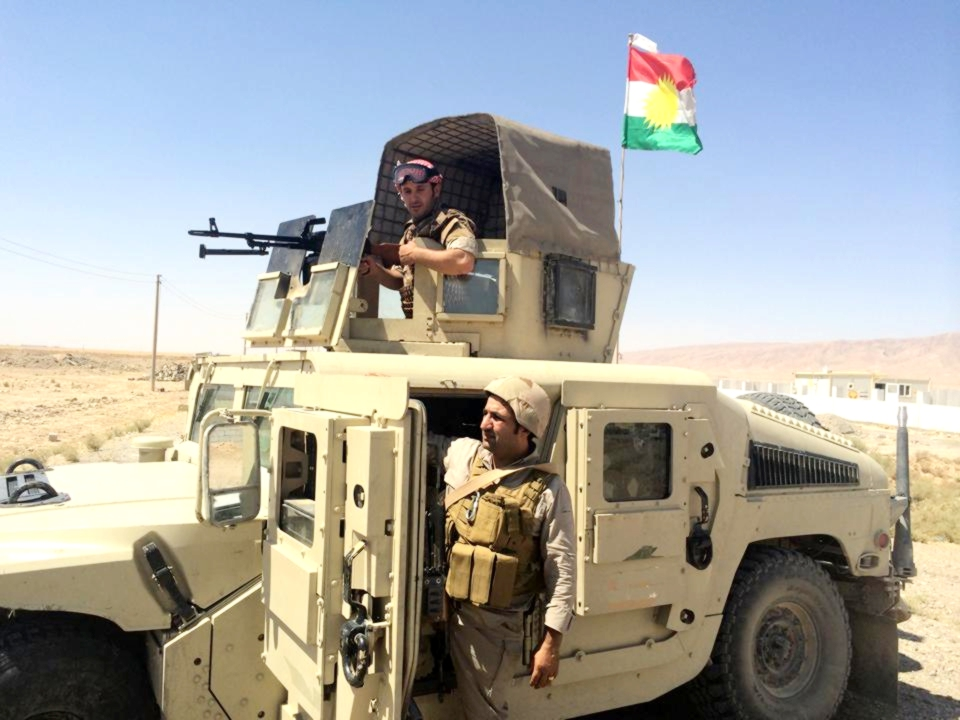
Peshmerga soldiers in a Humvee.
