= Nasr (sniper rifle) =

Iranian firearm

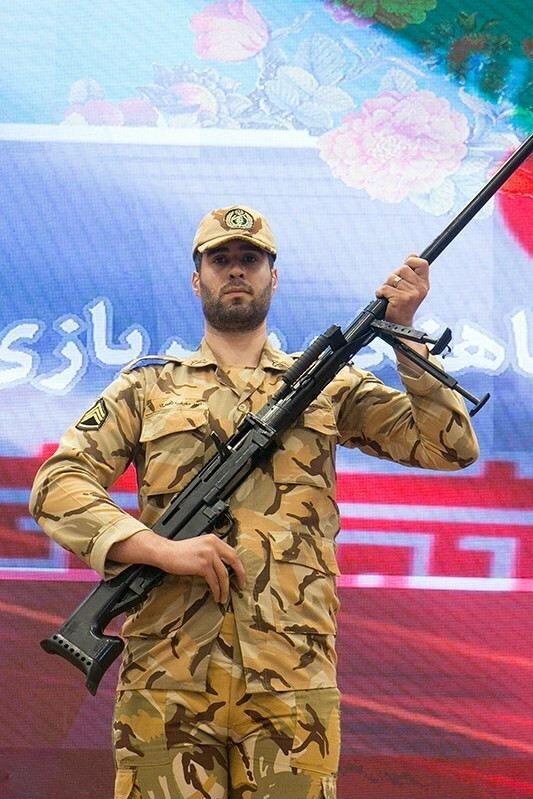
Nasr (sniper rifle)

The Nasr is an Iranian 12.7×108mm anti-materiel rifle, designed and built by domestic Iranian defense industries.

== History ==
The Nasr made its first appearance in photos from the 2016 IPAS exhibition.

== Design ==
The Nasr is a locally produced variant of the Russian OSV-96 anti-materiel rifle, also chambered in 12.7x108mm.
