= QBU-201 =

Bolt-action sniper rifle

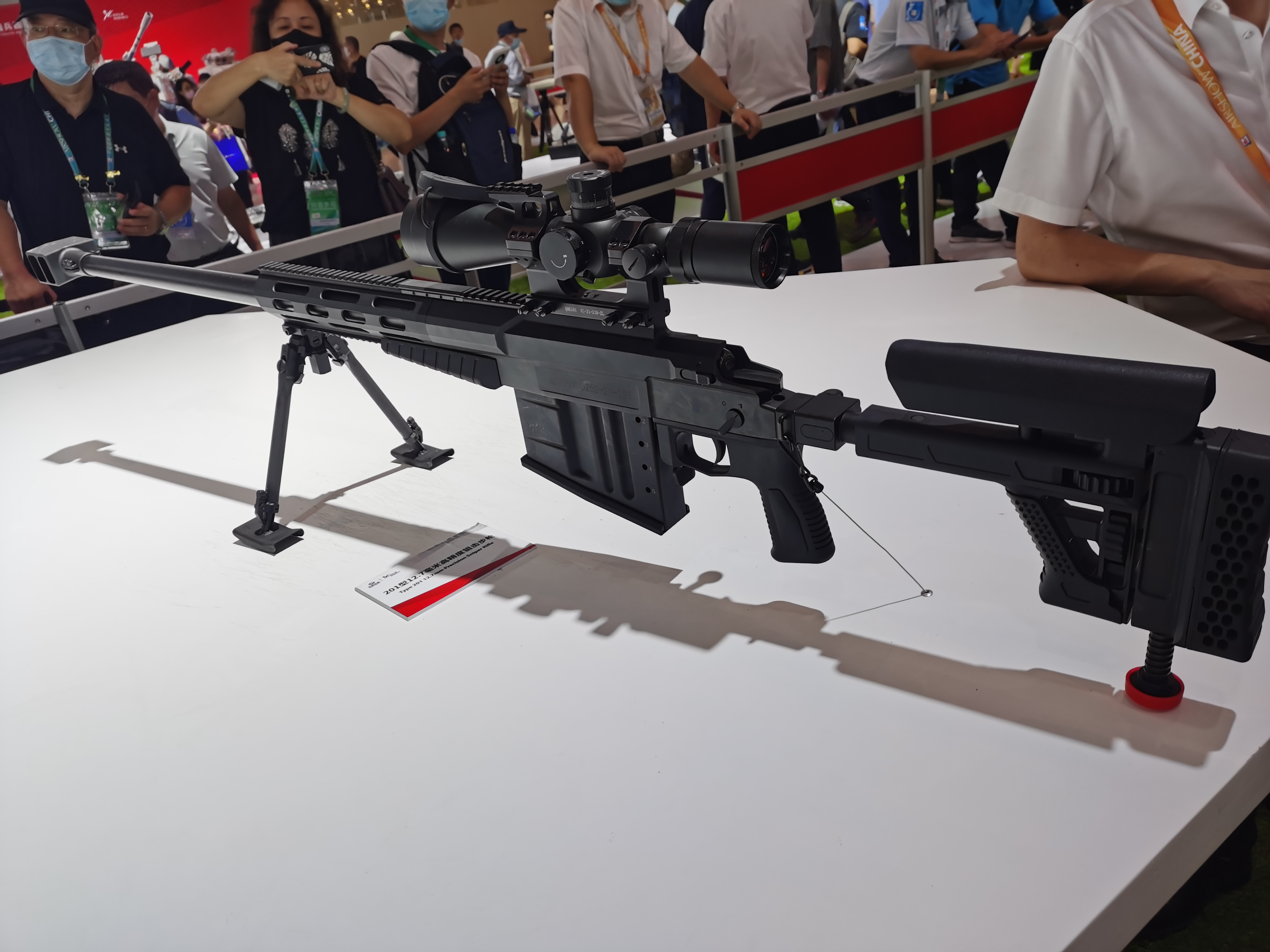
QBU-201 displayed at Zhuhai Airshow in 2021

The QBU-201 is a type of bolt-action anti-materiel rifle designed and manufactured by Chinese company Norinco. The weapon is chambered with improved 12.7×108mm high-precision ammunition in a 5-round box magazine. The rifle features a free-floating barrel, Picatinny rail, dual-chamber compensator, and a shoulder stock with a retractable recoil reducer.

== Variants ==
QBU-201
Chinese military version
CS/LR46
Export designation.

== Users ==
- China: People's Liberation Army Ground Force

== See also ==
- AMR-2
- QBU-10
