= Pauza P-50 =

- Type: Anti-materiel rifle
- Place of origin: United States

Service history
- In service: None
- Wars: None

Production history
- Designer: Robert Pauza
- Manufacturer: Robert Pauza
- No. built: 36 (Pauza-made P-50s)
- Variants: See Variants

Specifications
- Mass: Rifle: 14.52 (32 pounds) – No Magazine/Scope; 15.42 (34 pounds) – with empty magazine inserted; Carbine: 12.47 (27.5 pounds) – No Magazine/Scope; 13.38 (29.5 pounds) – with empty magazine inserted; 13.15 (29 pounds) – with bipod; 14.06 (31 pounds) – with bipod and magazine
- Length: Rifle: 56.5" (Overall); 29" (Barrel); Carbine: 50.5" (Overall); 24" (Barrel)
- Barrel length: Rifle: 49" (Disassembled Length); Carbine: 44" (Disassembled Length)
- Cartridge: .50 BMG (12.7 x 99 mm)
- Action: Gas operation, tilting bolt
- Muzzle velocity: 915 metres per second (3,000 ft/s)
- Effective firing range: 1,800 metres (2,000 yd)
- Feed system: 5 round detachable box magazine
- Sights: Picatinny railing available for installation of various telescope sights

The Pauza P-50 was a gas-operated, semi-automatic anti-materiel rifle developed by Robert Pauza. It was manufactured between 1990 and 1997, and sold by Pauza Specialties of Baytown, Texas; later versions were produced by Freshour Manufacturing, a company in Texas City, Texas. The rifle was developed to be a competitor to similar products by Barrett Firearms Manufacturing, although only 36 P-50s were produced.

== Variants ==
The rifle was produced in variants consisting of a sniper rifle and a carbine rifle, both in .50 caliber.

A similar firearm exists, the MG Arms Behemoth.

== See also ==
- List of anti-materiel rifles
