= OSV-96 =

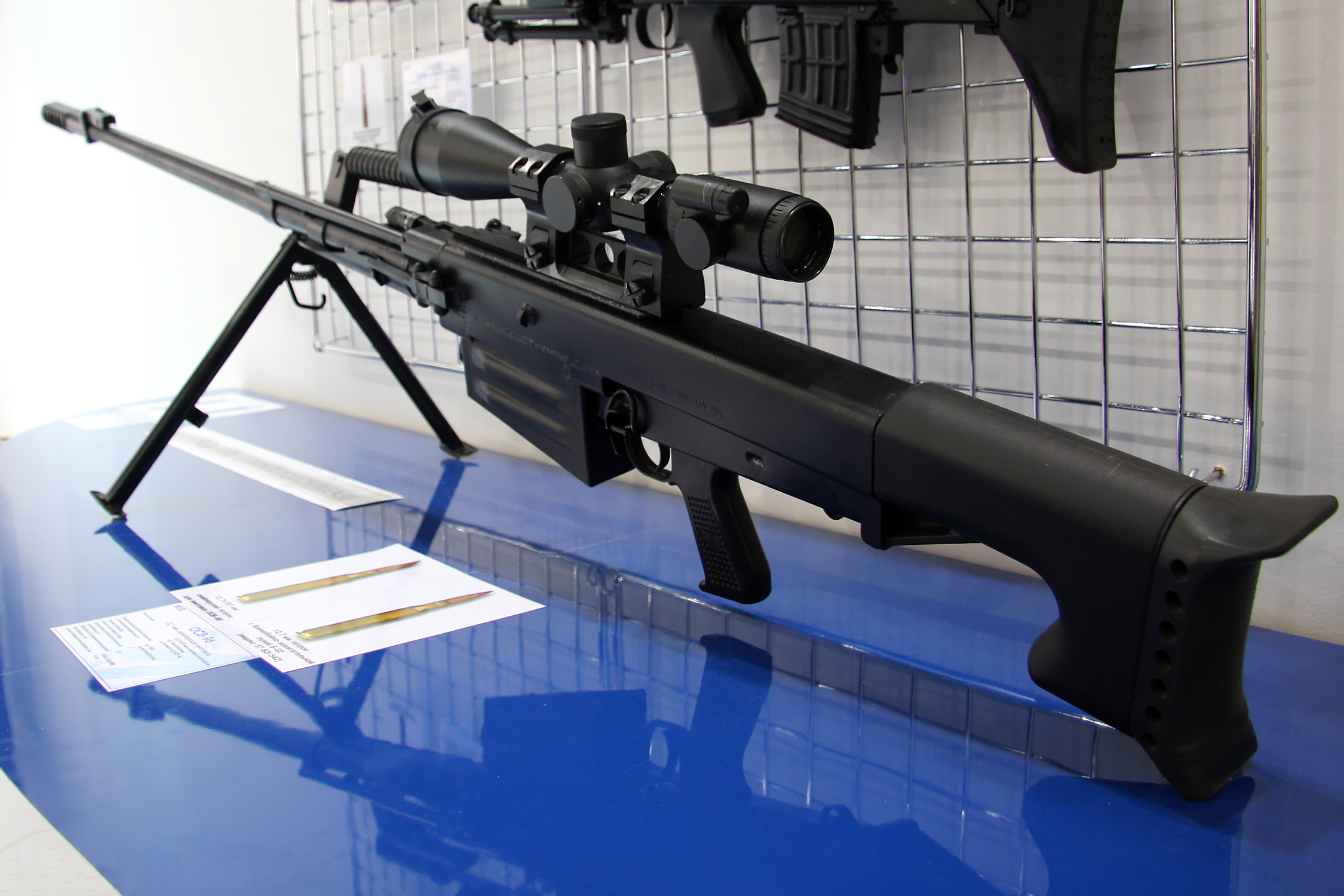
- OSV-96 in MAKS-2009
- Type: Anti-materiel rifle
- Place of origin: Russia

Service history
- In service: 2000–present
- Used by: See Users
- Wars: Syrian civil war 2020 Nagorno-Karabakh conflict

Production history
- Designer: A.G. Shipunov
- Designed: 1990 (Prototype V-94); 1996 (OSV-96)
- Manufacturer: KBP Instrument Design Bureau
- Produced: 1994 (Prototype V-94); 2000–present (OSV-96)
- Variants: V-94

Specifications
- Mass: 12.9 kg (28 lb) w/o scope
- Length: 1,746 mm (68.7 in)
- Barrel length: 1,000 mm (39 in)
- Cartridge: 12.7×108mm
- Action: Direct impingement gas-operated, rotating bolt
- Rate of fire: Semi-Auto
- Muzzle velocity: 870–910 m/s
- Effective firing range: 2,000 m (2,200 yd)
- Feed system: 5-round detachable box magazine
- Sights: various mounting sniper sights and back-up iron sights

The OSV-96 (Russian: ОСВ-96) is a Russian semi-automatic anti-materiel rifle chambered for 12.7×108mm.

== Design ==
The rifle is capable of engaging infantry at a distance of up to 1800 meters and can combat materiel targets at ranges up to 2500 meters. The OSV-96 can keep the shooter outside of the effective range of conventional calibers providing a distinct advantage over lower caliber rifles. Specialized high-accuracy 12.7×108mm 7N34 59.0 gram FMJ and AP sniper cartridges have been developed for Russian .50-caliber sniper rifles such as this rifle. Large caliber machine gun cartridges can also be used for firing, but with limited accuracy. With 7N34 ammunition, its accuracy is claimed as 1.5 MOA at 100 meters or better, equal to the Barrett M107.

The OSV-96 folds in half in between the barrel/chamber and receiver compartments to shorten its length for ease of transportation. The rifle features a free-floating barrel in combination with a large muzzle brake to greatly decrease its recoil.

=== Variants ===
- V-94 (В-94 «Волга») - Prototype was developed by the KBP (Instrument Design Bureau) in the early 1990s. V-94 was first revealed to the public in 1994. Initial muzzle energy is estimated to be 18860 J, while firing API ammunition (885 gr).
- OSV-96 (ОСВ-96 «Взломщик») - Developed in 1996–2000, entered service in March 2000. Design utilizes a number of improvements, such as a redesigned stock, muzzle brake, and carrying handle.
- MTs-567 (МЦ-567) - developed in 2018–2019, since August 2020 is allowed as civilian hunting weapon.

== Users ==
- Azerbaijan: Used by the special forces
- Belarus: Used by the special forces
- Egypt: Used by Egyptian special operation forces (El-Sa'ka Forces)
- India: Used by the Indian Army.
- Russia: Federal Security Service and Ministry of Internal Affairs
- Vietnam: Used by the Vietnamese military, manufactured by the Z111 Factory as the SBT-12.7 (unlicensed copy).

== Former users ==
- Ba'athist Syria: Used by both government and jihadist forces in the Syrian civil war

== See also ==
- KSVK 12.7 - the OSV-96's service competitor
- Barrett M82 - American counterpart
- QBU-10 - Chinese counterpart
- Accuracy International AS50
