= Zijiang M99 =

M99
- Ta'ang National Liberation Army with a Zijiang M99 rifle in 2023.
- Type: Semi-automatic anti-materiel rifle
- Place of origin: China

Service history
- In service: 2005-present
- Used by: See Users
- Wars: Syrian Civil War; War in Iraq (2013-2017); Myanmar Civil War; Sudanese civil war (2023–present)

Production history
- Manufacturer: Zijiang Machinery Company (Arsenal 9656)
- Produced: 2005-present
- Variants: M99-II; M06

Specifications
- Mass: 12 kg
- Length: 150 cm
- Cartridge: 12.7×108mm
- Action: Semi-automatic
- Muzzle velocity: 800 m/s
- Maximum firing range: 1500-1700 meters
- Feed system: 5-round box magazine

The Zijiang M99 is a semi-automatic anti-materiel rifle first introduced in 2005. It has since seen use by the People's Liberation Army Navy and Marine Corps in anti-piracy operations in the Gulf of Aden, and has been seen in the hands of various rebel groups involved in the Syrian Civil War.

== History ==
The acquisition of the M99 by rebel forces in Syria is thought to have been brokered through Qatar or Sudan.

== Design ==
The Type 99 is a lightweight 12.7x108 mm, direct impingement gas-operated, anti-materiel rifle. It features a large muzzle brake to aid in the mitigation of the recoil produced by its cartridge. A 2006 trial conducted by the Pakistan Army indicated that the rifle is capable of 1.6 MOA accuracy with the appropriate precision ammunition.

== Variants ==
- M99-II: .50 BMG variant.
- M06: Bullpup, drum magazine-fed variant.

== Users ==
- China: People's Liberation Army Navy and People's Liberation Army Marine Corps
- Kurdistan Region
- Myanmar: Myanmar Army-Sniper division and units at light infantry battalions
- Qatar
- Sudan: Sudan People's Armed Forces
- Syria

=== Non-State Actors ===
- Hamas
- Islamic State
- United Wa State Army

== See also ==
- Accuracy International AS50
- Barrett M82/M107
