= QBU-10 =

Type 10 Anti-Material Rifle
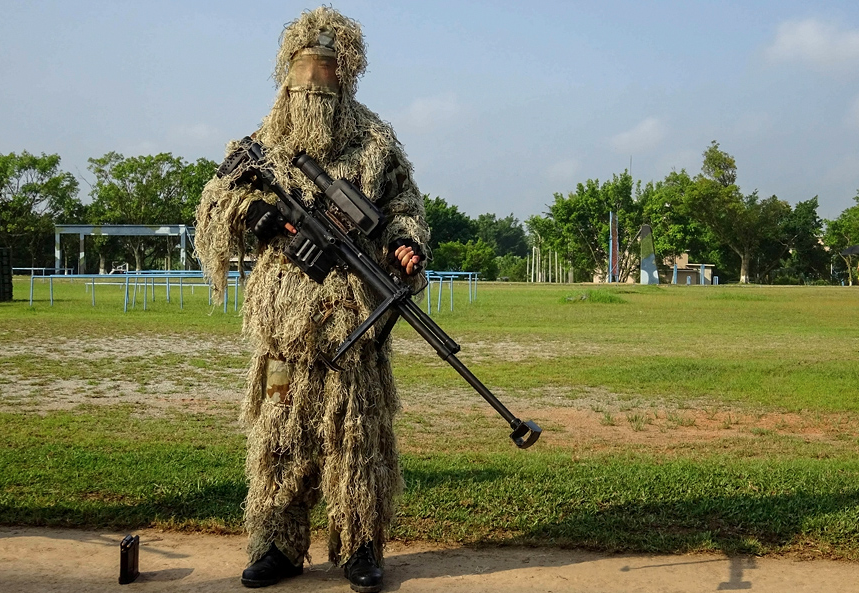
- A sniper of the People's Liberation Army Navy Marine Corps holding the QBU-10 sniper rifle
- Type: Semi-automatic anti-materiel rifle
- Place of origin: China

Service history
- In service: 2010–present
- Used by: See Users

Production history
- Designed: 2006
- Manufacturer: Norinco
- Produced: 2009–present

Specifications
- Length: 1,380 mm (54.3 in)
- Barrel length: 780 mm (30.7 in)
- Cartridge: 12.7×108mm
- Action: hybrid short-recoil and short-stroke piston
- Rate of fire: Semi-automatic
- Muzzle velocity: 825 m/s (2,706.7 ft/s)
- Effective firing range: 1,000–1,500 m (3,280.8–4,921.3 ft)
- Maximum firing range: 2,000 m (6,561.7 ft)
- Feed system: 5-round box magazine
- Sights: YMA09 (8x) scope with integrated ballistic computer and laser range finder QMH-151A daylight/thermal scope folded back-up iron sights

The QBU-10 or Type 10 sniper rifle is a semi-automatic anti-materiel rifle designed and manufactured by Norinco. First introduced in 2010, it has since seen use by the People's Liberation Army Ground Force, People's Liberation Army Navy, and Marine Corps.

== Design ==
QBU-10 is a type of semi-automatic anti-materiel rifle adopted by the Chinese military to roughly match the capability provided by Barrett M82 for United States military forces. The QBU10 features a gas operated, rotating bolt mechanics with a recoiling barrel. To increase accuracy, the gun barrel is free-floating, with the bipod, carrying handle, and iron sights mounted on top of the gas-tube housing. The rifle is reported to have slightly better accuracy than Barrett M82. The rifle is fed through a 5-round detachable box magazine. Recoil is mitigated through the hybrid actions, muzzle brake, rubber recoil pad, and a rear monopod, which can provide a stable firing platform. The rifle can be disassembled into several major components for transportation, including barrel, receiver, shoulder stock, and the grip with trigger unit.

Each QBU-10 is fitted with a YMA09 telescopic sighting unit (8x) with integrated ballistic computer and laser range finder. An additional night-time IR unit can be attached to the scope to provide thermal capability. The sighting unit is waterproofed with a range finder button extended to the trigger guard. YMA09 scope was superseded by the QMH151A integrated daylight/thermal scope with datalink and fire control system. QBU-10 can also mount CS/ON2A night vision scope.

Two type of dedicated sniper ammunitions are developed for the QBU-10. DBT-10 12.7×108mm sniper cartridge (Chinese: DBT10狙击弹) features air-resistance reduction design. The whole ammo weights 130 g (4.6 oz), the projectile tip weights 46 g (1.6 oz), with a muzzle velocity around 820 m/s (2,690.3 ft/s). The DBJ-10 12.7×108mm multipurpose round (Chinese: DBJ10多功能弹) is a type of armor-piercing incendiary PELE ammunition. The ammo utilizes "penetrator with enhanced lateral effect" (PELE), which contains inert substance inside the cartridge instead of incendiary explosives, and the inert substance will trigger a pressurized shockwave, sending off shrapnel after the round penetrating through armor.

== Variants ==
QBU-10
Chinese military designation.
NSG-127
Export version with Picatinny rail.

== Users ==
- Cambodia
- China: People's Armed Police, People's Liberation Army.
- Turkmenistan: Turkmen Armed Forces

== See also ==
- Accuracy International AS50
- Barrett M82/M107
- OSV-96
