= 6P62 =

- Type: Machine gun
- Place of origin: Russian Federation

Production history
- Designed: 2010

Specifications
- Mass: 15 kg (33 lb) (without rounds or additional sights); 3.5 kg (7.7 lb) (weight of the loaded magazine)
- Length: 1,200 mm (47 in)
- Cartridge: 12.7x108 mm (4.3 in)
- Action: Gas-operated
- Rate of fire: 400-500 rounds/min
- Muzzle velocity: 620–645 m/s (2,030–2,120 ft/s)
- Maximum firing range: 1,000 metres (3,300 ft)
- Feed system: 14-round detachable box magazine
- Sights: Iron sights : 100–1,000 metres (330–3,280 ft) (optical sights as an option)

6P62 (6П62) is the GRAU designation of a Russian handheld machine gun chambered for the 12.7×108mm round. Its project code name is unknown.

It is a large-frame automatic rifle with a short barrel and a folding bipod. It has a large compensating muzzle-brake on the end of the barrel to reduce the muzzle-flash, sound and recoil of the heavy round to manageable levels. All demonstrations used iron sights, as it is meant to be used at short ranges.

Its purpose was to provide close anti-vehicle support at a strongpoint or roadblock, where engagement range is too close for grenade launchers or rocket launchers. It would also be easier to transport and quicker to set up than a heavy machine gun or automatic-grenade launcher emplacement. Its most effective use would be by military police and border guards at checkpoints. It could also be used by assault troops to take and hold vital transport junctions like crossroads and bridges while waiting to be relieved by follow-on troops.

== See also ==
- List of Russian weaponry
