= Chechen War =

Chechen War may refer to:

- Chechen–Russian conflict, 1785–2017
- Caucasian War, 1817–1864
- Murid War, 1829–1859, a.k.a. Russian Conquest of Chechnya and Dagestan
- 1940–44 insurgency in Chechnya
- First Chechen War, December 1994–August 1996
- Second Chechen War, 1999–2009
- Insurgency in the North Caucasus, 2009–2017
