= Grizzly Big Boar =

- Type: Sniper rifle
- Place of origin: United States

Production history
- Manufacturer: L.A.R. Manufacturing Inc.
- Unit cost: US$3,500–3,900 (depending on finish)

Specifications
- Mass: 30.4 lb (13.8 kg)
- Length: 45.5 in (116 cm)
- Caliber: .50 BMG
- Action: Bolt action
- Feed system: Single-shot, breech-loading

The LAR Grizzly Big-Boar is a breech loading, single shot sniper rifle chambered for .50 BMG rounds. It was developed by L.A.R. Manufacturing Inc., a gunsmithing firm headquartered in West Jordan, Utah. The gun has been used in several Hollywood films, probably because its distinctive appearance and unusual loading method make it a memorable weapon.

== Prices ==
As of 2020, the weapon and its multiple finishes are priced as follows:

- Standard Blue: US$3,650.00
- Parkerized: US$3,750.00 US
- Standard Blue with Nickel trigger housing: US$3,800.00
- Full Nickel: US$3,900.00 US
- Stainless Steel barrel: US$4,000.00

== Features ==
The gun has the following features:

- 36 in (910 mm) heavy barrel
- Fully machined muzzle brake
- Bolt stop safety
- Thumb safety
- An exchangeable AR-15 grip (Grizzly started out making high quality parts for M-16's)
- Scope mount
- Tripod pintle mount
- Harris bipod

== Specifications ==
The Grizzly "Big Boar" is a breech-loading, single-shot bolt-action rifle. It is chambered in .50 BMG (Browning Machine Gun) rounds. It has a barrel length of 36 inches. The Rifling twist is 1 turn in 15 inches. The weight of this weapon is 30.4 pounds without the tripod mount and scope. The overall length of this weapon is 45.5 inches. This weapon can be purchased from LAR chambered in either Match Grade or Field Grade Rounds.

== In popular culture ==
The LAR Grizzly Big-Boar can be seen in the following movies:

- Tremors 2: Aftershocks (1996): Used by Burt Gummer (played by Michael Gross) to take out a single shrieker, a concrete wall, wooden beams, several oil barrels, an outhouse, and their escape vehicle, in a single shot. He states in the movie that it uses a "World War I Anti-Tank cartridge".
- Tremors 3: Back to Perfection (2001): It is briefly seen several times until it meets its demise when Burt Gummer (played by Michael Gross) has to put an ammo can on his truck's gas pedal, propelling it off a cliff, so he and his friends can get away from a Graboid.
- The Rock (1996): Seen briefly when Private McCoy's (played by Steve Harris) M60E3 runs out of ammo. He is knocked off the roof of the building he was on before he is able to use it. It has the muzzle brake removed.
- Lost World: Jurassic Park (1997): The LAR Grizzly Big-Boar is used for the tranquilizer guns depicted in the film.

The a modified version of the LAR Grizzly Big-Boar with an SL8-style rifle stock was also planned to appear in Half-Life 2, as seen in pre-release builds, but was cut in favor of the Resistance's homemade crossbow.

== Legality ==
Owning a rifle that uses .50 BMG rounds is legal in most U.S. states, and some places allow the use of these weapons for hunting. As a single shot weapon, it is also legal to own in the United Kingdom, although not to use for hunting and there are very few ranges that allow the use of .50 BMG rounds.

== See also ==
.50 BMG
