= AMR-2 =

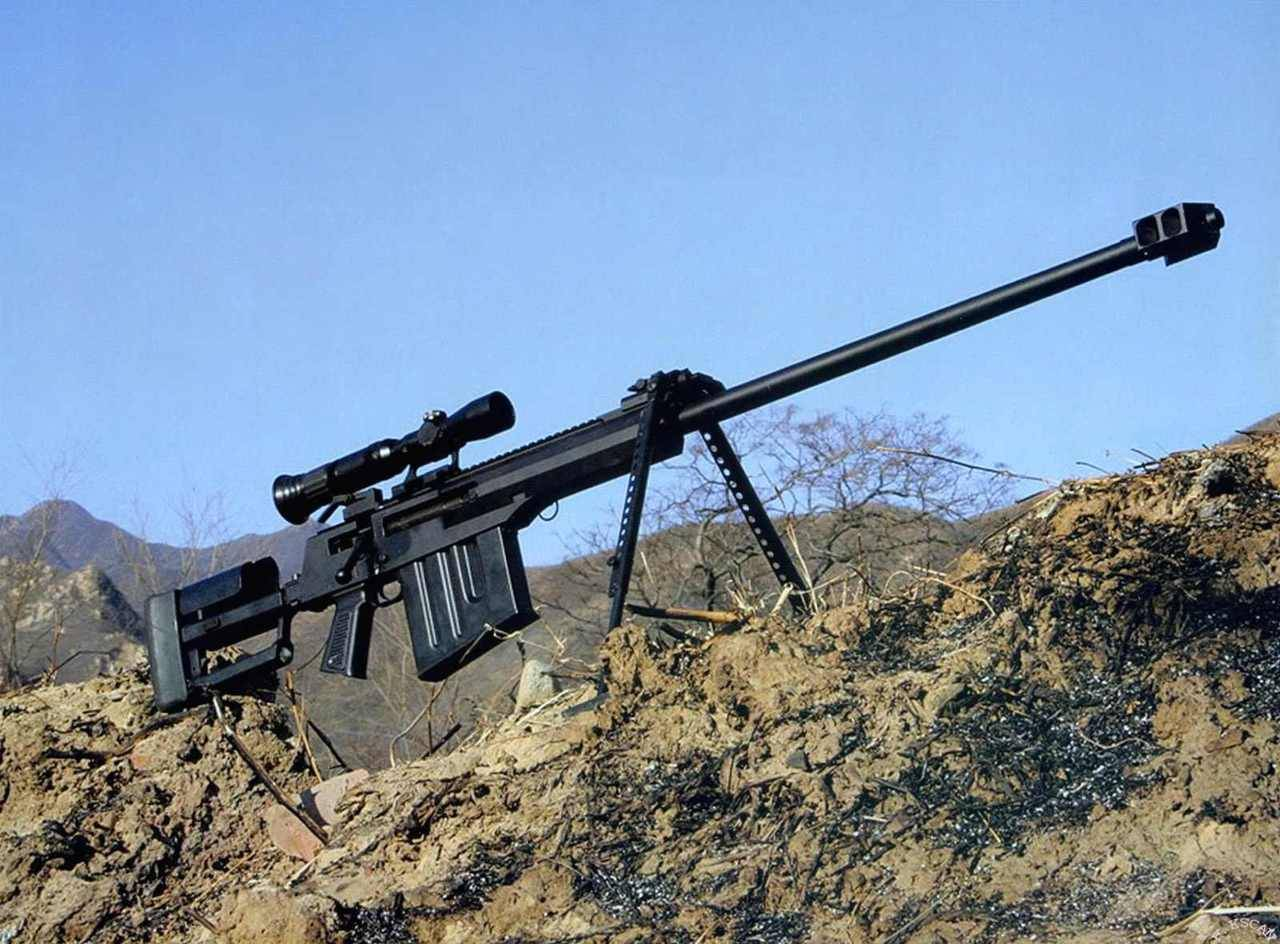
- Type: Anti-material rifle
- Place of origin: China

Service history
- In service: 2000–present

Production history
- Manufacturer: China South Industries Group
- Produced: Currently in production

Specifications
- Mass: 9.8kg
- Length: 1420mm (stock extended); 1230mm (stock closed); 57" (inches) (stock extended)
- Barrel length: 850mm
- Cartridge: 12.7×108mm
- Caliber: .50 Russian
- Action: Bolt action
- Effective firing range: 2,000 metres (2,200 yd)
- Maximum firing range: 2,500 metres (2,700 yd)
- Feed system: 5 round box magazine

The AMR-2 (Anti Material Rifle - 2) is a 12.7mm sniper rifle which was developed in China as an anti-materiel sniper weapon, it was introduced in the early 2000s. Designed and developed by Sichuan Huaqing Machinery Co. Ltd, a subsidiary of China South Industries Group, the rifle uses a conventional bolt-action design. The AMR-2 fires a 12.7×108mm cartridge from a 5-round detachable box magazine fitted directly ahead of the trigger group. The barrel is free-floating and has a large double baffle muzzle brake to mitigate recoil.

It is normally fitted with side-folding buttstock with an adjustable cheekpiece, a folding bipod, and a detachable rear monopod under the butt. The rifle is fitted with open iron sights on folding bases, and a Picatinny rail is provided for installation of telescopic or night sights.
