= Accuracy International AS50 =

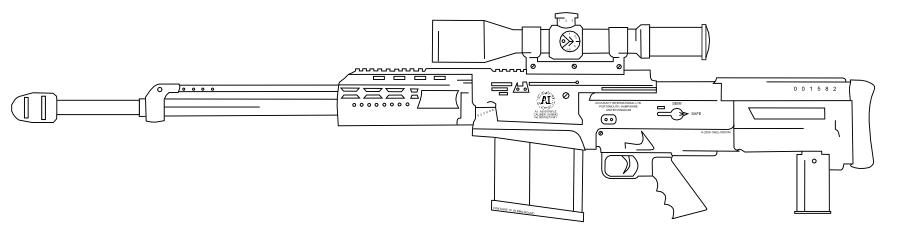
- Type: Anti-materiel precision rifle
- Place of origin: United Kingdom

Production history
- Designed: 2005
- Manufacturer: Accuracy International
- Produced: 2007

Specifications
- Mass: 14.1 kg (31 lb) (unloaded, no optic)
- Length: 1,369 mm (53.9 in)
- Barrel length: 692 mm (27.2 in)
- Cartridge: .50 BMG
- Action: Gas operation, direct impingement
- Rate of fire: semi-automatic, estimated at 5 rounds/1.6 seconds
- Muzzle velocity: 1,219 m/s
- Effective firing range: 1,800 m (2,000 yd)
- Feed system: 5-round detachable box magazine
- Sights: Optical sight

The AS50 is a semi-automatic .50 BMG anti-materiel precision rifle manufactured by British firearms producer Accuracy International. It enables operators to engage targets at very long range with high accuracy using explosive or incendiary ammunition, and employs a gas operated semi-automatic action and muzzle brake, allowing for lower recoil than the AW50 bolt-action rifle and faster target acquisition. The rifle is highly transportable, ergonomic and lightweight. It can be disassembled in less than three minutes and serviced without tools.

The AS50 is designed for the British Armed Forces and United States Navy SEALs, the rifle is employed due to its high rate of fire (five rounds in 1.6 seconds). This high rate of fire is due mostly to the floating barrel and the lightweight titanium frame.

The rifle has an accuracy of 1.5 MOA. The barrel is free-floating. The two-part machined steel receiver features an integral accessory rail for mounting optical sights. Two additional rails are mounted on the sides of the short barrel shroud. An adjustable bipod and rear support leg/hand grip allow for stable shooting. This weapon can accurately engage targets at a range of 1,500 metres (1,600 yd).

The AS50 weighs 14.1 kilograms (31 lb) empty and holds five rounds of .50 BMG in a single-stack, removable box magazine.

== See also ==
- OSV-96 – Russian counterpart
- Barrett M82 – another semi-automatic .50 BMG sniper rifle
