= Barrett M82 =

American anti-materiel sniper rifle

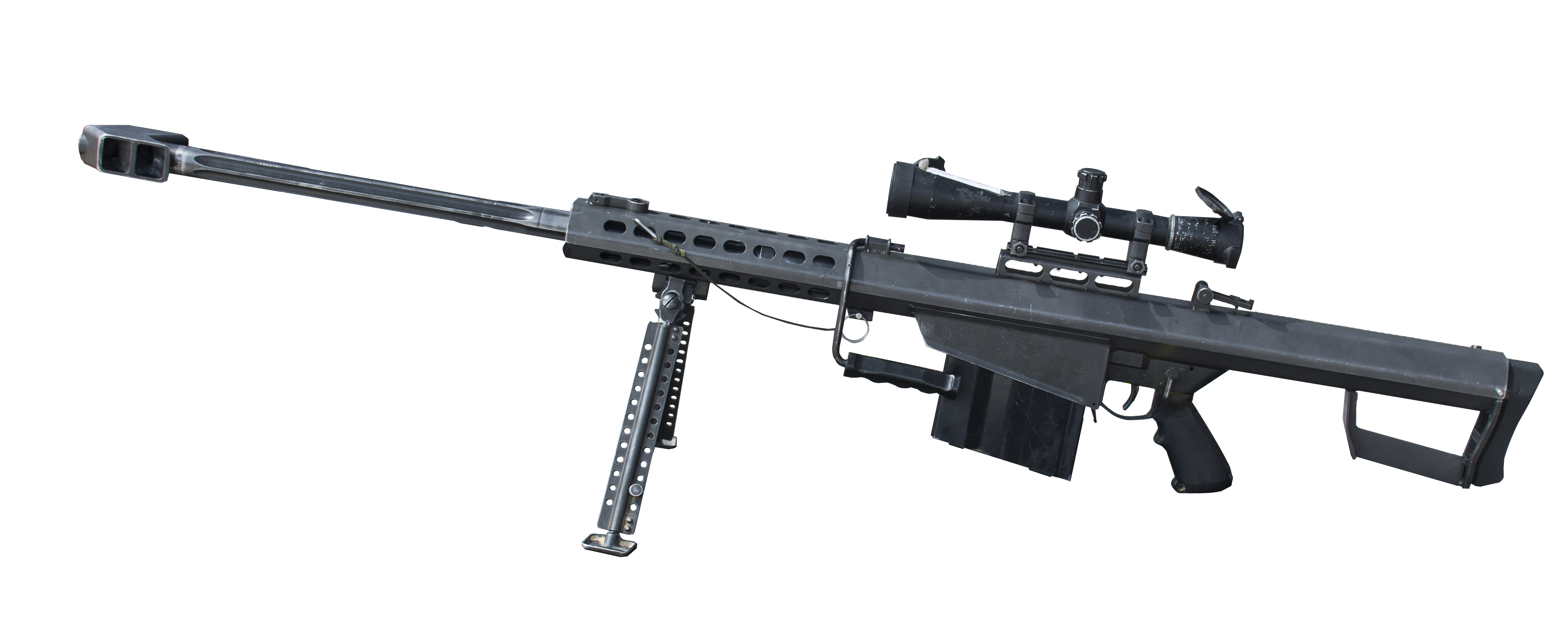
- A Barrett M82A1
- Type: Anti-materiel rifle
- Place of origin: United States

Service history
- In service: 1989–present
- Used by: See Users
- Wars: The Troubles; Soviet–Afghan War; Gulf War; Kosovo War; War in Afghanistan; Iraq War; Mexican drug war; War in Iraq (2013–2017); Second Libyan Civil War; Russo-Ukrainian War

Production history
- Designer: Ronnie Barrett
- Designed: 1982
- Manufacturer: Barrett Firearms Manufacturing
- Produced: 1982–present

Specifications
- Mass: 29.7 lb (13.5 kg) to 32.7 lb (14.8 kg)
- Length: 48 in (120 cm) to 57 in (140 cm)
- Barrel length: 20 in (51 cm) to 29 in (74 cm)
- Diameter: 16 mm
- Cartridge: .50 BMG; .416 Barrett
- Action: Recoil-operated rotating bolt
- Muzzle velocity: 2,799 ft/s (853 m/s)
- Effective firing range: 1,969 yd (1,800 m)
- Feed system: 5- or 10-round detachable box magazine
- Sights: Iron sights or various optics on MIL-STD-1913 rail

The Barrett M82 (standardized by the U.S. military as the M107) is a recoil-operated, semi-automatic anti-materiel rifle developed by Barrett Firearms Manufacturing and produced in the United States.

Also called the Light Fifty (due to its chambering of the .50 BMG 12.7×99mm NATO cartridge), the weapon is classified in three variants: the original M82A1 (and M82A3) models, the bullpup M82A2 model, and the Barrett M107A1, with an attached QDL adapter muzzle brake (designed to accept a suppressor, and made lighter with the use of aluminum and titanium). The M82A2 is no longer manufactured, though the XM500 can be seen as its successor.

Despite being designated as an anti-materiel rifle, the M82 can also be deployed in an anti-personnel role.

== Overview ==
Barrett Firearms Manufacturing was founded by Ronnie Barrett for the sole purpose of building semi-automatic rifles chambered for the powerful 12.7×99mm NATO (.50 BMG) ammunition, originally developed for and used in M2 Browning machine guns. The weapon was first sold to the Swedish Army in 1989. In 1990, the United States armed forces purchased the M82A1 during operations Desert Shield and Desert Storm in Kuwait and Iraq. About 125 rifles were initially bought by the United States Marine Corps, and orders from the Army and Air Force soon followed. The M82A1 is known by the U.S. military as the SASR—"Special Applications Scoped Rifle", and it was and still is used as an anti-materiel rifle and explosive ordnance disposal tool.

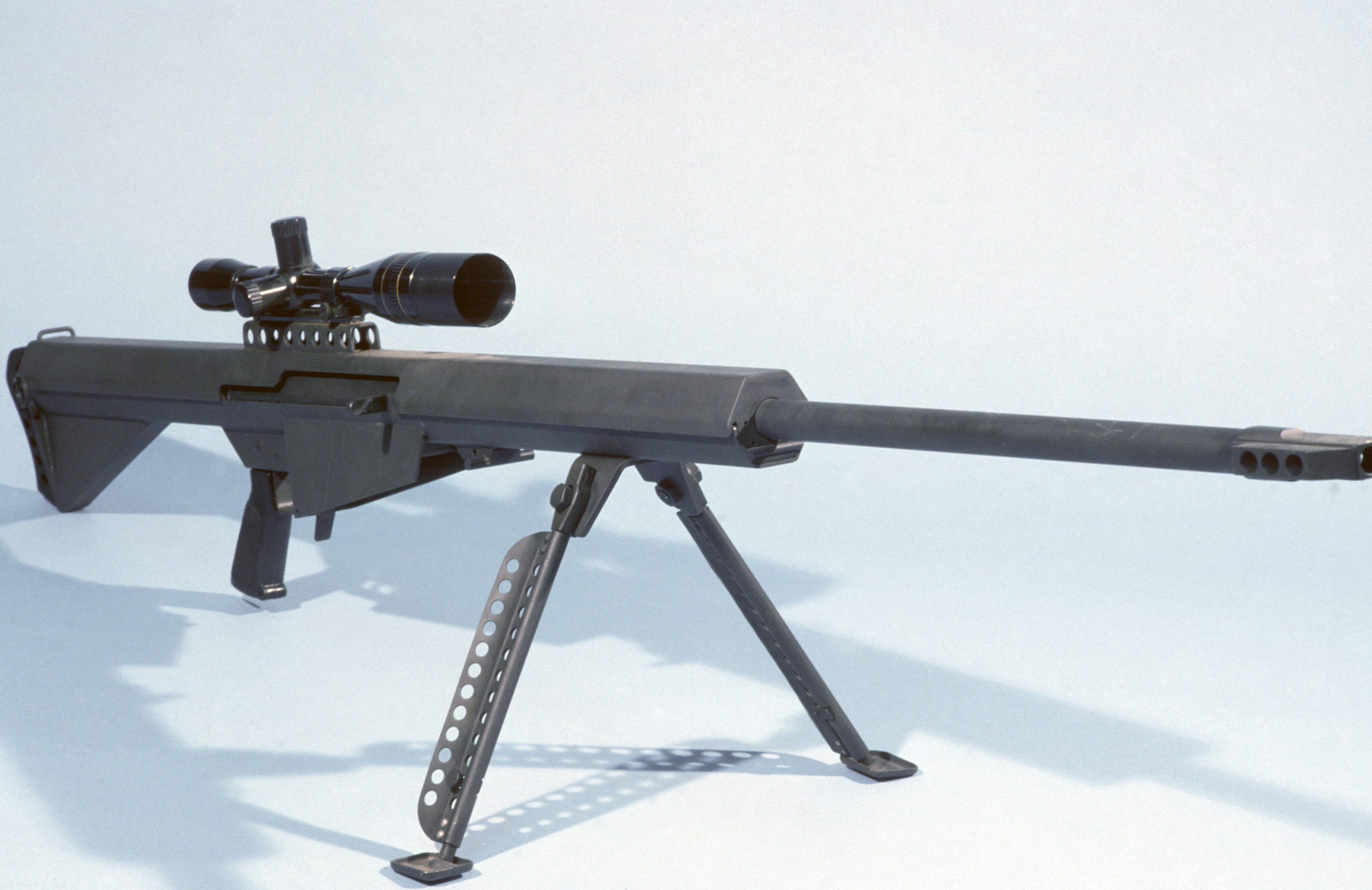
An early model M82

In 2006, Barrett completed development of the XM500, which has a bullpup configuration similar to the M82A2. Barrett M82 rifles were bought by various military and police forces from at least 30 countries, such as Belgium, Chile, Denmark, Finland, France, Germany, Greece, Indonesia, Italy, Jamaica, Mexico, the Netherlands, and others.

The Barrett M82A1 rifle was used in 2002 as a platform for the experimental OSW (Objective Sniper Weapon) prototype. This weapon was fitted with a shorter barrel, and fired 25 mm high-explosive shells developed for the 25×59 mm OCSW (Objective Crew Served Weapon) automatic grenade launcher. The experimental OSW showed an increased effectiveness against various targets, but the recoil was beyond human limitations. This weapon, also known as the Barrett "Payload Rifle", has now been designated the XM109.

=== Use by the Provisional IRA ===
The Provisional IRA smuggled a number of M82s into Ireland from the United States in the 1980s, apparently made and sold by a gunsmith and former Barrett Firearms employee in Texas. One of the M82s was shipped from Chicago to Dublin in pieces, where it was re-assembled. The IRA equipped two sniper teams with the Light Fifties, later reinforced with a couple of M90s bought in the United States from an arms dealer in 1995. The IRA snipers killed five soldiers and a constable with .50 rifles from 1992 to 1997. The snipers usually fired on their targets from a distance of less than 300 metres (980 ft), despite the 1,800 m (5,900 ft) effective range of the weapons.

=== Use by Mexican drug cartels ===
In 2021, Barrett and nine other U.S. gun manufacturers were named in a lawsuit brought by the Mexican government in the U.S. District Court for the District of Massachusetts, seeking $10 billion in damages. The Mexican government claimed that the Barrett M82 is one of the weapons of choice for drug cartels. According to Romain Le Cour Grandmaison, an expert interviewed by Reuters, the M82 has disrupted the balance of power between criminals and poorly-equipped police forces.

== Variants ==
- M82: 12.7×99mm Barrett M82 semi-automatic rifle.
- M82A1: 12.7×99mm Barrett M82A1 semi-automatic rifle. Improved variant including redesigned muzzle brake.
- M82A1A: 12.7×99mm Barrett M82A1 semi-automatic rifle variant. Optimized for use with the Raufoss Mk 211 .50 caliber round.
- M82A1M: 12.7×99mm Barrett M82A1 semi-automatic rifle variant. Improved variant including lengthened accessory rail. Includes rear grip and monopod socket.
- M82A2: 12.7×99mm Barrett M82A2 semi-automatic bullpup rifle. Bullpup configured variant made to compensate for recoil by being shoulder-mounted.
- M82A3: 12.7×99mm Barrett M82A3 semi-automatic rifle. New production rifles built to M82A1M specifications, featuring lengthened accessory rail which is usually, but not always, raised higher up than the M82A1M/M107. Unlike the M82A1M/M107, it does not include a rear grip and monopod socket.
- XM107/M107: Initially used to designate 12.7×99mm Barrett M95 bolt-action rifle. Designation changed to apply to a product improved M82A1M variant. Includes lengthened accessory rail, rear grip, and monopod socket.

== M82 to M107 ==
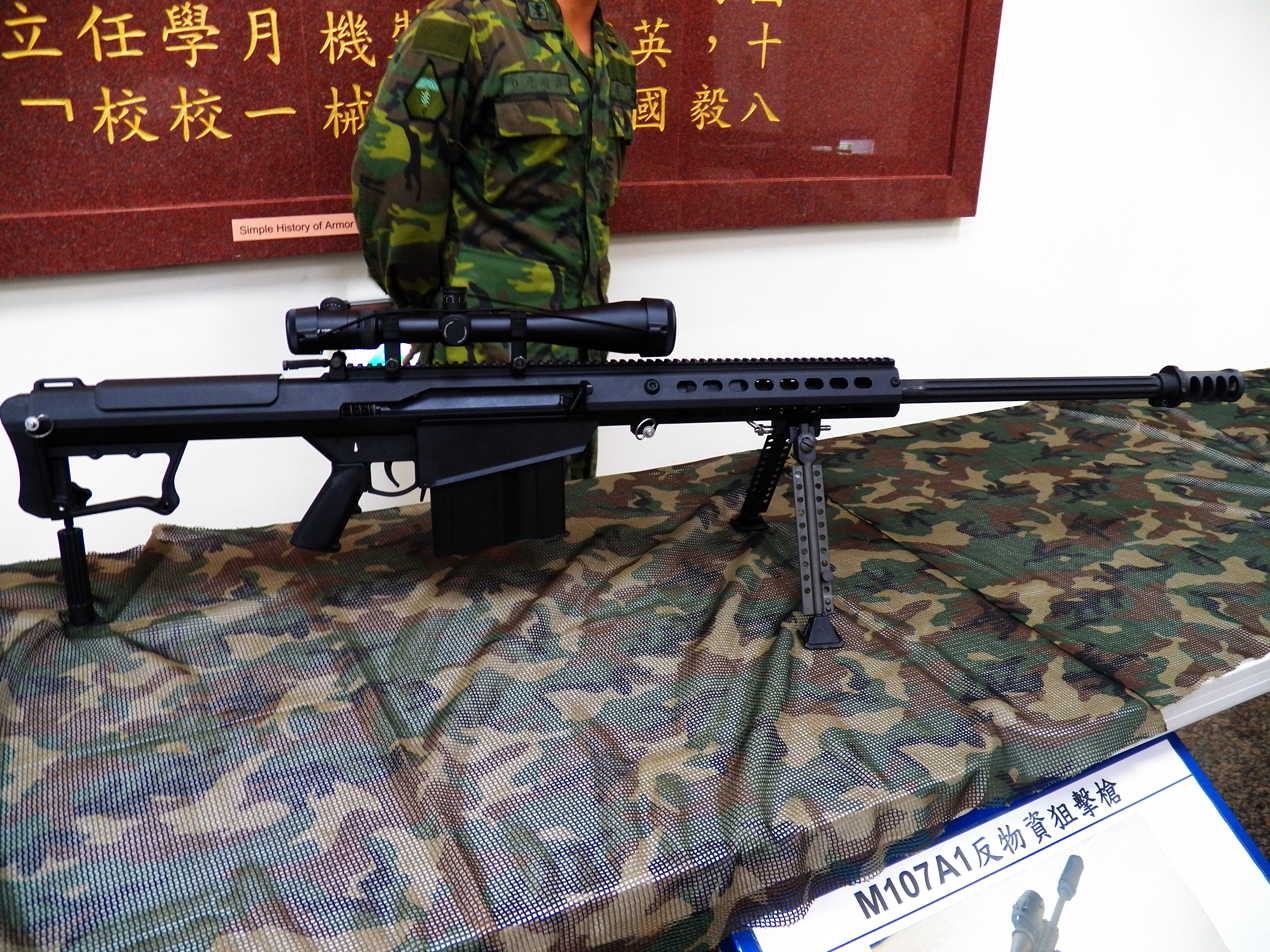
Barrett M107A1

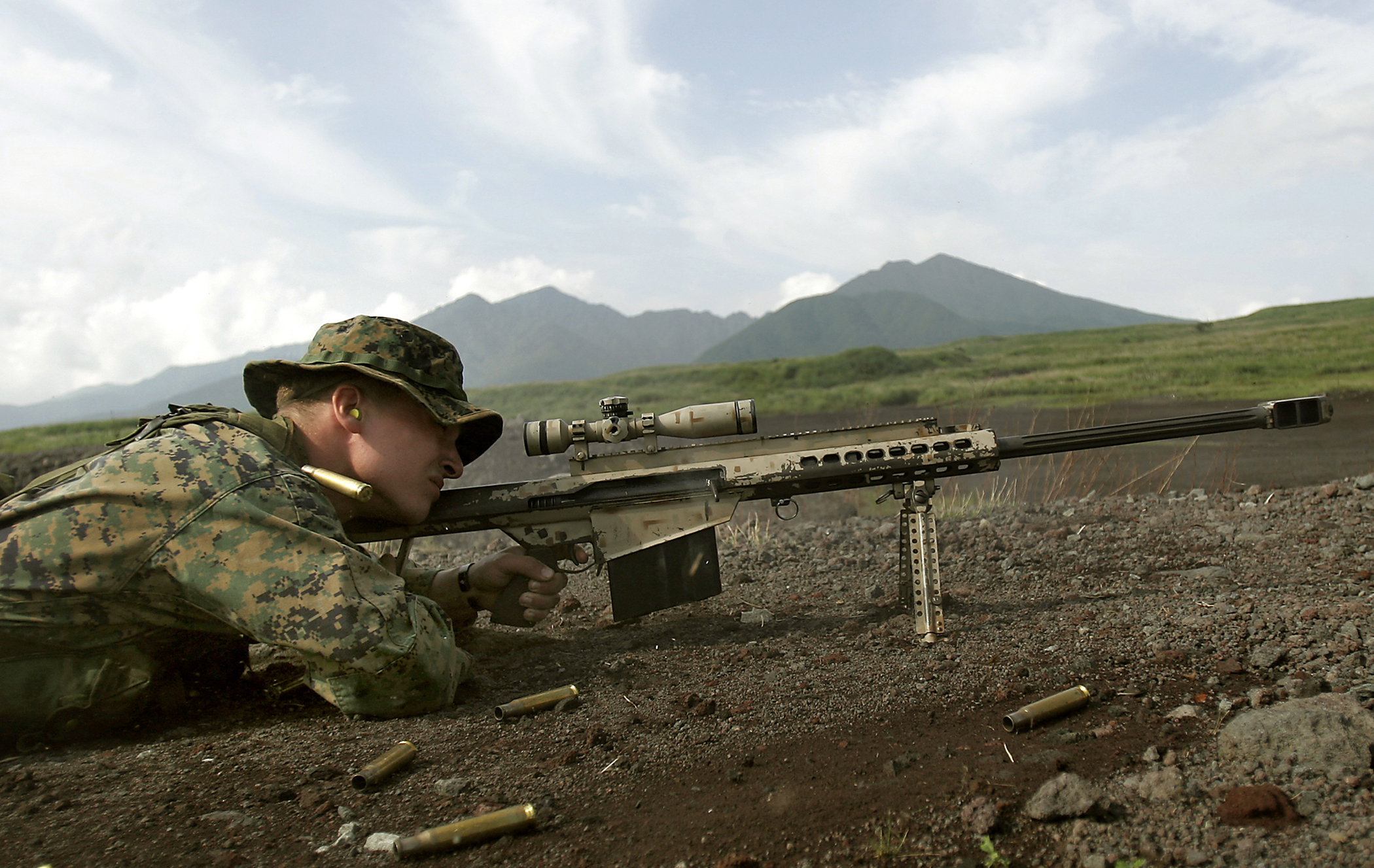
USMC scout sniper firing downrange with an M82A3

The XM107 was originally intended to be a bolt-action sniper rifle, and the Barrett M95 was originally selected by the U.S. Army in a competition between such weapons. However, under the trials, the decision was made that the U.S. Army did not, in fact, require such a weapon. In summer 2002, the M82 finally emerged from its Army trial phase and was officially adopted as the Long Range Sniper Rifle, Caliber .50, M107. The M107 uses a Leupold 4.5–14×50 Mark 4 scope.

The Barrett M107 is a .50 caliber, shoulder-fired, semi-automatic sniper rifle. Like its predecessors, the rifle is said to have manageable recoil for a weapon of its size owing to the barrel assembly that itself absorbs force, moving inward toward the receiver against large springs with every shot. Additionally, the weapon's weight and large muzzle brake also assist in recoil reduction. Various changes were made to the original M82A1 to create the M107, with new features such as a lengthened accessory rail, rear grip, and monopod socket.

The Barrett M107, like previous members of the M82 line, is also referred to as the Barrett "Light Fifty". The designation has in many instances supplanted earlier ones, with the M107 being voted one of 2005's top 10 military inventions by the U.S. Army.

The U.S. Army and Marine Corps plan to field another Barrett rifle, the Mk22 MRAD, in 2021 to replace the M107. The Mk22 is a bolt-action multi-caliber rifle that is powerful enough to replace the M107 when chambered in .338 Norma Magnum.

== Technical description ==
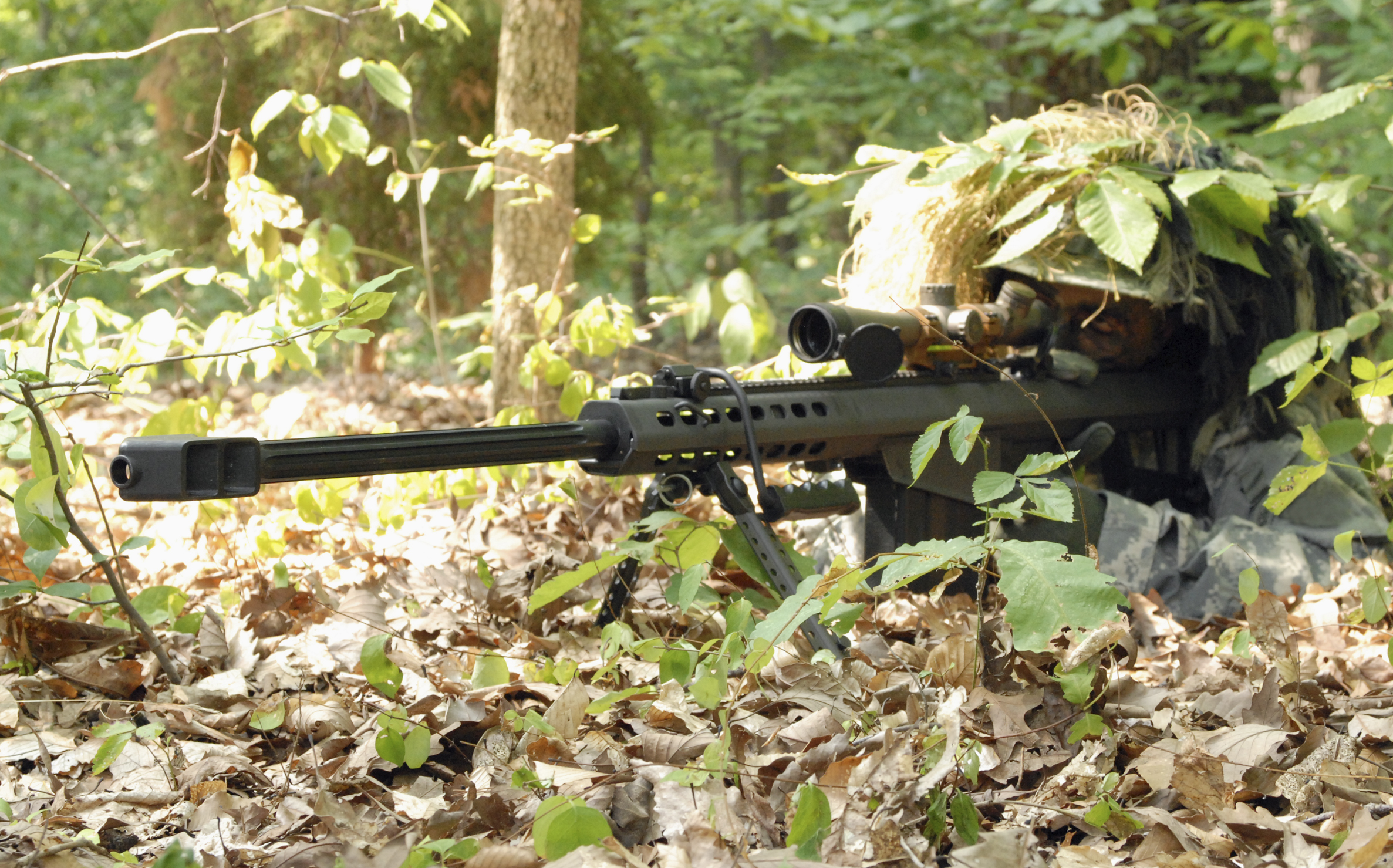
A U.S. Army sniper using an M107

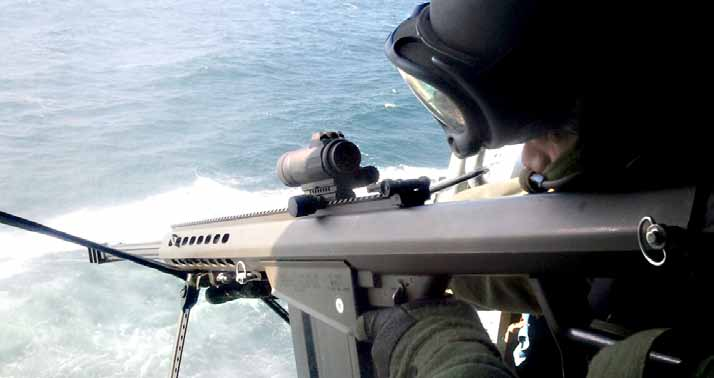
A U.S. Coast Guard TACLET marksman with a Barrett M107

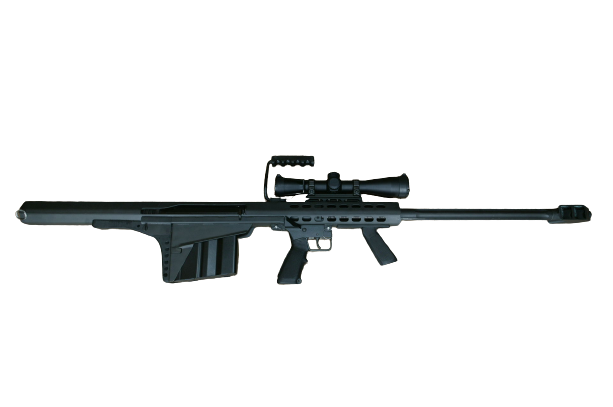
Barrett model M82A2

The M82 is a short-recoil semi-automatic firearm. When the gun is fired, the barrel initially recoils for a short distance (about 1 inch (25 mm)), while being securely locked by the rotating bolt. After the short travel, the lower part of the accelerator arm, held by the receiver upper part, is already hinged in the bolt carrier and the middle portion strikes it back to the barrel by a rod placed in the bolt carrier, transferring part of the recoil energy of the barrel to the bolt to achieve reliable cycling and unlock it from the barrel. The bolt is unlocked by turning in the curved cam track in the bolt carrier. Then the barrel is stopped by the combined effect of the accelerator, buffer spring, and the muzzle brake and the bolt continues back, to extract and eject a spent case. On its return stroke, the bolt strips the fresh cartridge from the box magazine and feeds it into the chamber and finally locks itself to the barrel. The striker is also cocked on the return stroke of the bolt. The gun is fed from a large, detachable box magazine holding up to ten rounds, although a rare twelve-round magazine was developed for use during Operation Desert Storm in 1991.

The receiver is made from two parts (upper and lower), stamped from sheet steel and connected by cross-pins. The heavy barrel is fluted to improve heat dissipation and save weight, and fitted with a large and effective reactive muzzle brake. The muzzle brakes on the earlier models had a round cross-section; later M82 rifles are equipped with two-chamber brakes of rectangular cross-section.

M82A1 rifles are fitted with scope mount and folding backup iron sights, should the glass scope break. The U.S. military M82 rifles are often equipped with Leupold Mark 4 telescopic sights. The M82A1M (USMC M82A3) rifles have long Picatinny accessory rails mounted and US Optics telescopic sights. Every M82 rifle is equipped with a folding carrying handle and a folding bipod (both are detachable on the M82A3). The M82A3 is also fitted with a detachable rear monopod under the butt. The buttpad is fitted with a soft recoil pad to further decrease the felt recoil. M82A1 and M82A3 rifles could be mounted on the M3 or M122 infantry tripods (originally intended for machine guns) or on vehicles using the special Barrett soft-mount. The M82A1 can be fitted with a carry sling, but according to those who carried it in the field, the M82 is too uncomfortable to be carried on a sling due to its excessive length and weight. It is usually carried in a special carry soft or hard case.

The M82A2 differed from M82A1 mostly in its configuration; the pistol grip along with trigger was placed ahead of the magazine, and the buttpad placed below the receiver, just after the magazine. An additional forward grip was added below the receiver, and the scope mount was moved forward.

The M107's maximum effective range is 1,830 m (2,000 yd), while it can hit targets past 2,000 m (2,200 yd). The maximum range of this weapon (specifically the M107 variant) is 4,000 m (4,400 yd), as quoted in the owner's manual.

== Users ==
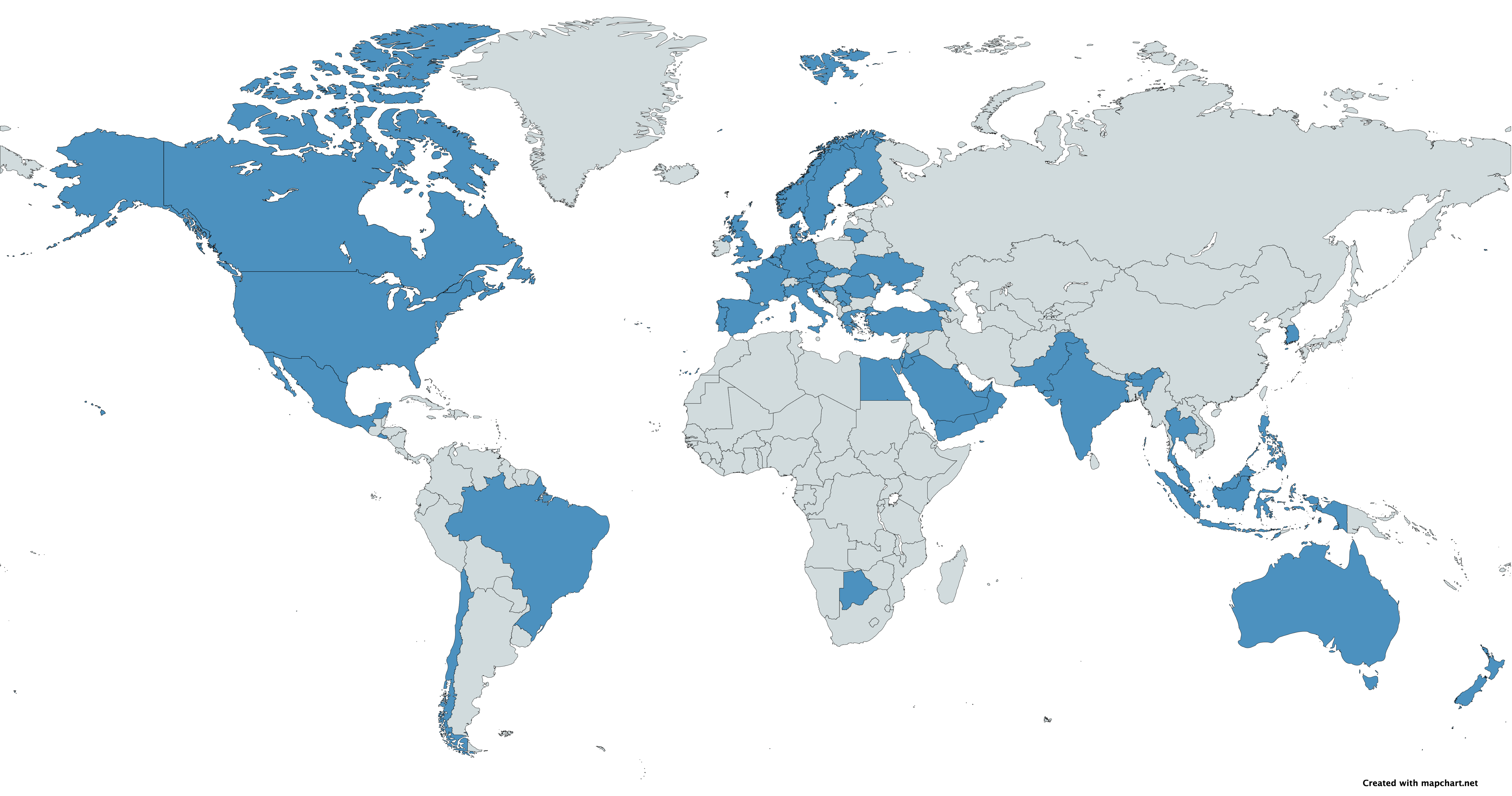
A map with Barrett M82 users in blue

- Australia: Used by Australian Army
- Austria: Used by Austrian Army SF Jagdkommando
- Bahrain
- Belgium
- Bhutan
- Botswana
- Brazil
- Canada: Used by JTF2 operatives in small numbers
- Chile
- Colombia
- Croatia
- Czech Republic
- Denmark
- Egypt: Used by Thunderbolt Forces, Unit 1999, Egyptian navy special forces brigades and Black Cobra Unit
- El Salvador
- Finland
- France: Used by GIGN (before PGM Hécate II)
- Georgia: Used by the army including special forces
- Germany: Used by the German Army
- Greece
- India: Used by Mumbai Police Force One Commandos and Indian special forces
- Indonesia: Used by Army Special Forces Command (Kopassus) and Amphibious Reconnaissance Battalion (Taifib).
- Israel: Used by the IDF Combat Engineering Corps
- Italy
- Jordan
- Kuwait
- Kosovo
- Lithuania: Used by Lithuanian Armed Forces
- Malaysia: Used by Malaysian Special Operations Force
- Mexico
- Moldova: M107A1
- Netherlands

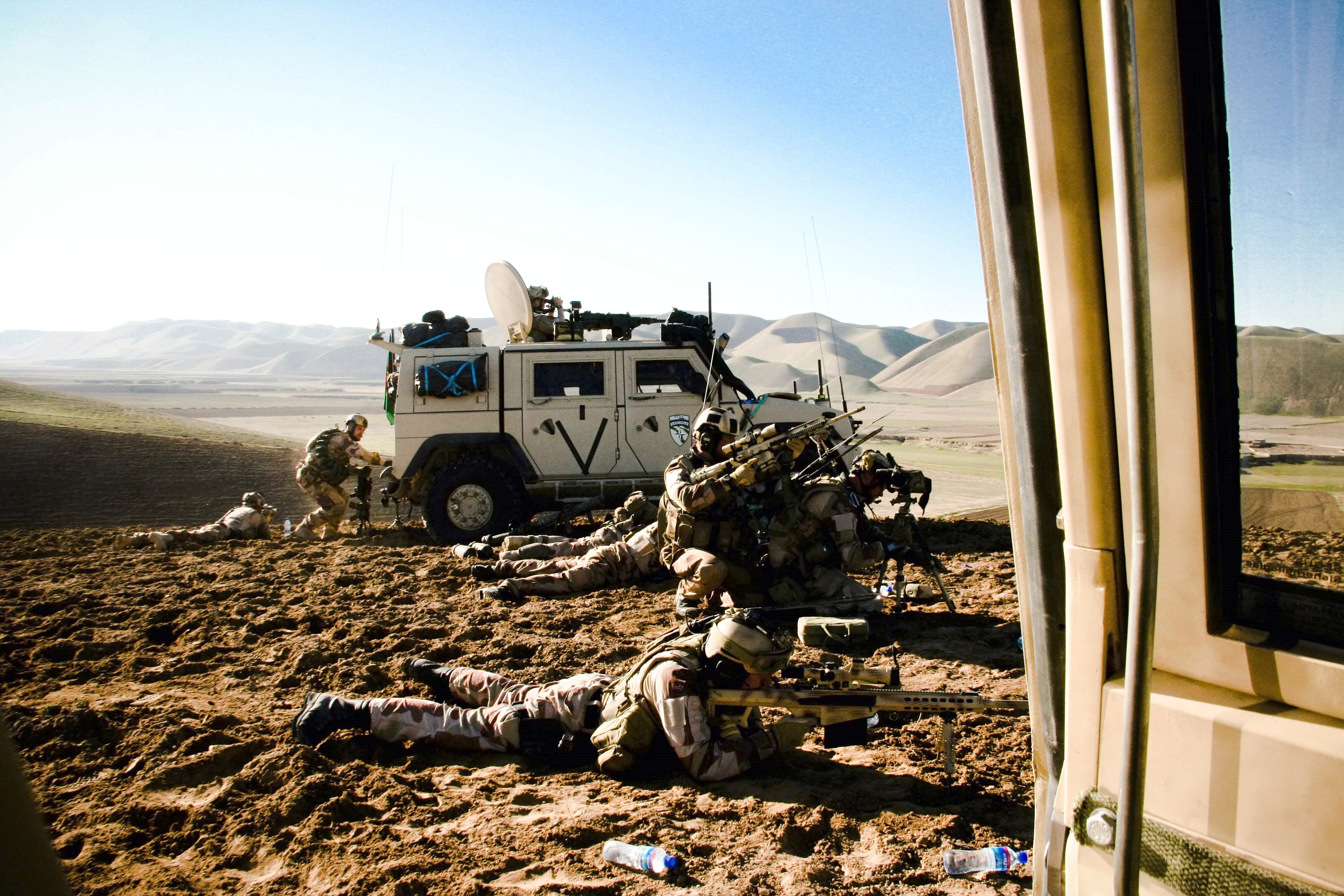
Norwegian M82 (foreground) in a long-range fire fight in Afghanistan

- New Zealand
- Norway: M82 and M107A1
- Oman
- Pakistan
- Philippines: Used by Armed Forces of the Philippines, delivered in 2019, and Philippine National Police
- Portugal: Used by Portuguese Army
- Qatar
- Romania: Used by Special Forces
- Saudi Arabia
- Serbia: Used by Special Forces
- Singapore: Used by Special Forces
- Slovakia: Used by 5th Special Operations Regiment
- Slovenia: Used by Special Police Unit
- Spain
- Sweden
- South Korea
- Turkey
- Thailand
- Ukraine: Used by Ukrainian Ground Forces
- United Arab Emirates
- United Kingdom
- United States
  - US Armed Forces
  - Texas Highway Patrol: Two Barrett rifles are in each Davis-class patrol boat

=== Non-state users ===
- Afghan Mujahideen: A number were supplied by the CIA
- Al Qaeda: Obtained around 25 rifles in 1988
- Houthis
- Kosovo Liberation Army: Smuggled out of the US
- Moro Islamic Liberation Front: Clones made from captured Barrett M82s
- Provisional IRA

== Awards and recognition ==
On February 26, 2016, the U.S. state of Tennessee named the Barrett Model M82 as its official state rifle.

== See also ==
- Accuracy International AS50
- List of crew-served weapons of the U.S. Armed Forces
- McMillan TAC-50
- QBU-10
- Steyr HS .50 / HS .460
- Zijiang M99
