= 12.7 × 108 mm =

Rifle cartridge

12.7×108mm
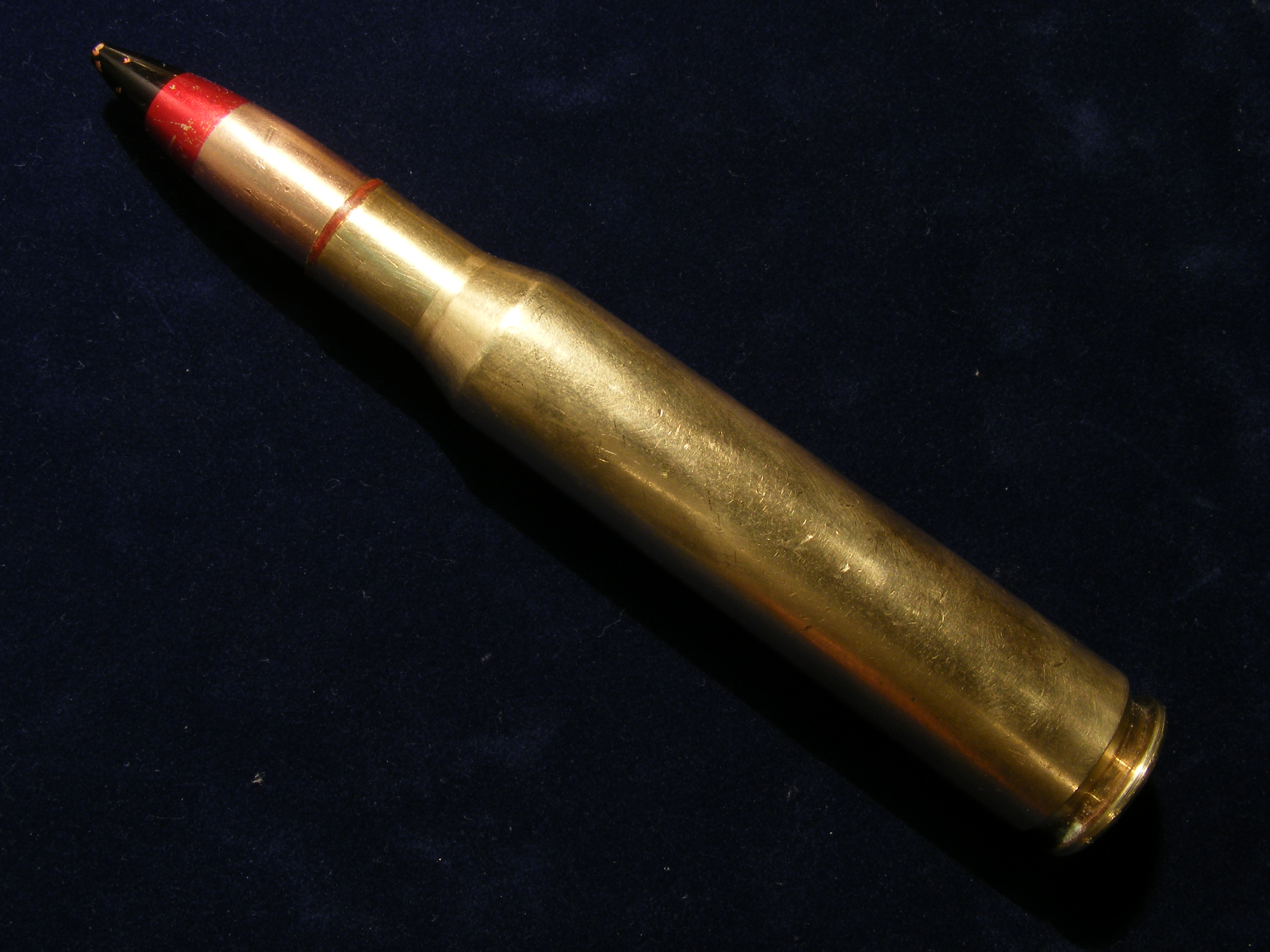
- A 12.7 × 108 mm cartridge
- Type: Heavy machine gun Anti-materiel rifle
- Place of origin: Soviet Union

Service history
- In service: 1935–present
- Used by: Soviet Union and successor states
- Wars: Winter War; World War II; Korean War; Portuguese Colonial War; Vietnam War; Cambodian Civil War; Cambodian–Vietnamese War; Six-Day War; War of Attrition; The Troubles; Yom Kippur War; Soviet–Afghan War; Iran–Iraq War; Gulf War; Chechen War; Iraq War; War in Afghanistan; Libyan Civil War; Syrian Civil War; Nagorno-Karabakh conflict Russo-Ukrainian War; Gaza war

Specifications
- Case type: Rimless, bottleneck
- Bullet diameter: 12.98 mm (0.511 in)
- Neck diameter: 13.95 mm (0.549 in)
- Shoulder diameter: 18.90 mm (0.744 in)
- Base diameter: 21.75 mm (0.856 in)
- Rim diameter: 21.70 mm (0.854 in)
- Rim thickness: 1.90 mm (0.075 in)
- Case length: 108 mm (4.3 in)
- Overall length: 147.50 mm (5.807 in)
- Case capacity: 22.72 cm^{3} (350.6 gr H_{2}O)
- Primer type: Berdan
- Maximum pressure: 360 MPa (52,000 psi)

Ballistic performance
Bullet mass/type	Velocity	Energy
48.3 g (745 gr) API B32 57-BZ-542	820–860 m/s (2,700–2,800 ft/s)	16,240–17,861 J (11,978–13,174 ft⋅lbf)
55.4 g (855 gr) API-HC BS	820 m/s (2,700 ft/s)	18,625 J (13,737 ft⋅lbf)
56.6 g (873 gr) API-HC BS 7-BZ-1	820–825 m/s (2,690–2,710 ft/s)	19,029–19,621 J (14,035–14,472 ft⋅lbf)
59.2 g (914 gr) Sniper SN 7N34	770–785 m/s (2,530–2,580 ft/s)	17,549–18,240 J (12,943–13,453 ft⋅lbf)
44.1 g (681 gr) Tulammo 680 gr hunting cartridge	916–923 m/s (3,010–3,030 ft/s)	18,501–18,785 J (13,646–13,855 ft⋅lbf)
- Test barrel length: 1000 mm

The 12.7×108mm cartridge is a 12.7 mm heavy machine gun and anti-materiel rifle cartridge used by the former Soviet Union and Warsaw Pact countries, as well as China, Iran, and North Korea. It was invented in 1934 to create a cartridge like the German 13.2mm TuF anti-tank rifle round and the American .50 Browning Machine Gun round (12.7×99mm NATO).

It is used in the same roles as the NATO .50 BMG (12.7×99mm NATO) cartridge. The two differ in bullet shape and weight; the casing of the 12.7 × 108 mm is slightly longer, and its larger case capacity allows it to hold slightly more of a different type of powder. The 12.7 × 108 mm can be used to engage a wide variety of targets on the battlefield, and will destroy unarmored vehicles, penetrate lightly armored vehicles, and damage external ancillary equipment (e.g. searchlights, radar, transmitters, vision blocks, and engine compartment covers) on heavily armored vehicles, such as tanks. It will also ignite gasoline and—since 2019—diesel fuel (experimental "Avers" AP/I round).

== Cartridge dimensions ==
The 12.7 × 108 mm has 22.72 ml (350 grains) H_{2}O cartridge case capacity.

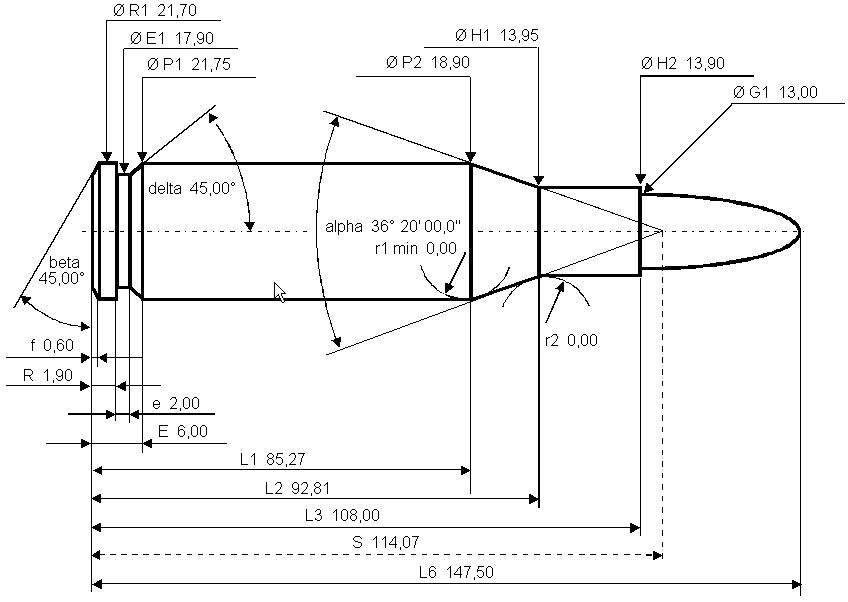

12.7 × 108 mm maximum cartridge dimensions. All sizes in millimeters (mm).

Americans define the shoulder angle at alpha/2 ≈ 18.16 degrees.

According to guidelines the 12.7 × 108 mm case can handle up to 360 MPa (52,213 psi) piezo pressure. In C.I.P. regulated countries every rifle cartridge combo has to be proofed at 125% of this maximum CIP pressure to certify for sale to consumers.

== Cartridge types ==
=== Soviet and Russian 12.7 × 108 mm types ===
Б-30 (B-30)
First version of 1930. Armor-piercing (бронебойная) bullet weighing 49 g (1.7 oz) and 64 mm (2.5 in) long with hardened steel core. Replaced by B-32.
БЗТ (BZT)
Pre-WW2 armor-piercing incendiary (бронебойно-зажигательная) tracer. Replaced by BZT-44.
Б-32 (B-32) (GRAU# 57-BZ-542, 7-BZ-2)
Steel-cored API bullet. Main type in use. Penetrates 20 mm (0.79 in) NATO medium-hard RHA from 500 m (1,600 ft) at 0° when fired out of DShKM. Penetrates 20 mm (0.79 in) 2P steel from 100 m (330 ft) at 0° when fired out of NSV-12.7. First produced 1936; named after the B-32 7.62×54mmR ammunition of 1932.
БС-41 (BS-41)
API bullet weighing 55.4 g (1.95 oz) and 51 mm (2.0 in) long with a cemented carbide (Re8 WC-Co) core. Produced in small quantities at the beginning of WWII for the 12.7 mm Sholokhov anti-tank rifles (PTRSh-41).
БЗТ-44 (BZT-44) (GRAU# 57-BZT-542)
APIT with brighter tracer, usually used with B-32. Complemented by BZT-44M (GRAU# 57-BZT-542M) of 2002 with subdued tracer.
БЗФ-46 (BZF-46)
API bullet with (white) phosphorus (фосфорная). Aircraft MG round.
БС (BS) (GRAU# 7-BZ-1)
API bullet with cemented carbide (VK8 WC-Co, commonly called a "cermet" in Russian) core, developed in 1972. Ballistics also similar to B-32.
МДЗ / MDZ (GRAU# 7-3-2)
Immediate-action incendiary. Used in belt with B-32 and BZT-44(M).
12,7 1СЛ (12.7 1SL) (GRAU# 9-A-4012)
12,7 1СЛТ (12.7 1SLT) (GRAU# 9-A-4427)
Tandem / duplex cartridge with two bullets inside, in normal and tracer versions. Developed 1985 for use by helicopter against soft targets.
12,7СН (12.7SN) (GRAU# 7N34)
Sniper cartridge (FMJ; AP). Bullet weighs 59.2 g (2.09 oz) and travels at ~800 m/s (2,600 ft/s). Bullet consists of hardened tool steel tip and lead body. Able to defeat lightly-armored vehicles at 1,500 m (4,900 ft) and 10 mm (0.39 in) RHA at 800 m (2,600 ft). Entered production in the 2000s.
12.7 Blank (GRAU# 7H1)
12.7 UCH Dummy (GRAU# 7H2)

Note that some WW2 bullets share designations with ones for 14.5×114mm.

== Use ==
=== Rifles ===
China

- (China) 2000 – AMR-2 anti-materiel rifle
- (China) 2005 – Zijiang M99 anti-materiel rifle
- (China) 2006 – Zijiang M06 anti-materiel rifle
- (China) 2010 – QBU-10 anti-materiel rifle
- (China) 2012 – Zijiang LR-2/LR-2A anti-materiel rifle
- (China) 2021 – QBU-201 precision sniper rifle

Czechia

- (Czech Republic) 1996 – ZVI Falcon OP96 anti-material rifle
- (Czech Republic) 2000 – ČZW-127 anti-materiel rifle

Georgia

- (Georgia (country)) 2013 – PDShP anti-materiel rifle

Hungary

- (Hungary) 1990 – Gepárd anti-materiel rifle

India

- (India) 2007 – Vidhwansak anti-materiel rifle

Russia

- (Russia) 1994 – V-94 anti-materiel rifle
- (Russia) 1998 – SVN-98 experimental anti-materiel rifle
- (Russia) 1998 – KSVK-12.7 anti-materiel rifle
- (Russia) 2000 – OSV-96 anti-materiel rifle

Syria

- (Syria) 2018 – Golan S-01 anti-materiel rifle

Ukraine

- (Ukraine) 2017 – Snipex M

Serbia

- (Socialist Federal Republic of Yugoslavia) 1993 – Zastava M93 Black Arrow anti-materiel rifle
- (Serbia) 2012 – Zastava M12 Black Spear anti-materiel rifle

=== Machine guns ===
China

- (China) 1977 – Type 77 heavy machine gun
- (China) 1988 – QJC-88 heavy machine gun
- (China) 1989 – QJZ-89 heavy machine gun
- (China) 2001 – QJH001 (M17G) hatch machine gun
- (China) 2005 – CS/LM5 rotary machine gun
- (China) 2023 – QJZ-171 (CS/LM23) heavy machine gun

Russia

- (Soviet Union) 1934 – ShVAK aircraft machine gun
- (Soviet Union) 1938 – DShK heavy machine gun
- (Soviet Union) 1939 – Berezin BS aircraft machine gun
- (Soviet Union) 1941 – Berezin UB aircraft machine gun
- (Soviet Union) 1953 – Afanasev A-12.7 aircraft machine gun
- (Soviet Union) 1971 – NSV-12.7 heavy machine gun
- (Soviet Union) 1973 – YakB-12.7 rotary aircraft machine gun
- (Russia) 1998 – Kord-12.7 heavy machine gun
- (Russia) 2010 – 6P62 handheld machine gun

Serbia

- (Socialist Federal Republic of Yugoslavia) 1987 – Zastava M87 heavy machine gun
- (Serbia) 2002 – Zastava M02 Coyote heavy machine gun

== See also ==
- .50 BMG (American equivalent)
- 14.5 × 114 mm
- 20 mm caliber
