= List of military equipment of the Czech Army =

This is a list of military equipment of the Czech Republic currently in service and in storage. This includes weapons and equipment of the Czech Armed Forces and its service branches (Land Forces, Air Force, Czech Territorial Forces, Czech Information and Cyber Forces, Czech Special Forces) as well as other Czech military forces (Castle Guard or Military Police).

== Personal equipment ==
- ACH/MICH-style ballistic helmet
- Ops-Core FAST
- 46 988 ballistic vests VOBU II
- Vz 85 leaf camouflage pattern
- Vz 95 leaf camouflage pattern (M95 combat uniform—U.S. M1948 ERDL-style)
- MAD21 camouflage pattern (M21 combat uniform—U.S. M1948 ERDL and MultiCam mixed)—

== Small arms ==
=== Active firearms ===
List of firearms:

Standard issue in infantry units (in bold)

Name	Photo	Country of origin	Type	Caliber	Notes
Pistols
**CZ P-10 C/F**		Czech Republic	Semi-automatic pistol	9×19mm Parabellum	Selected in 2020 as new standard-issue pistol, replaced CZ 75 SP-01 Phantom; 2020: Order for 20,000 standard pistols + 1,000 suppressor ready; 2025: 10,500 ordered.
Glock 17 Glock 25 Glock 31 Glock 37		Austria	Semi-automatic pistol	9×19mm Parabellum.380 ACP.357 SIG.45 GAP	In service since 2003 as replacement of CZ 82 in selected units.; In use by the 601st Special Forces Group and paratroopers of the 43rd Airborne Regiment; Glock 25, 31 and 37 in use according to the official website of the Ministry of Defence (Czech Republic)
Submachine guns
CZ Škorpion EVO 3		Czech Republic	Submachine gun	9×19mm Parabellum	In service with Prague Castle Guard and in other specialist roles; 100 CZ SCORPION EVO 3 A1 ordered in 2020
Heckler & Koch MP5	MP5 SD6 MP5K	Germany	Submachine gun	9×19mm Parabellum	In use by the 601st Special Forces Group; MP5 SD6 PDW; MP5K PDW
Heckler & Koch MP7 A2		Germany	Submachine gun	4.6×30mm HK	In use by the Military Police
Shotguns
Winchester Model 1300		United States	shotgun	12 gauge	Winchester Model 1300 used in small numbers
Benelli M3		Italy	shotgun	12 gauge	In use by the 601st Special Forces Group and paratroopers
Rifles
**CZ BREN 2**		Czech Republic	Assault rifle Carbine	5.56×45mm NATO	Standard issue rifle since 2020 as CZ 805 BREN & vz. 58 replacement; 2016: order for 2,600: 2,600 ZD-Dot red dot; 1,600 DV-Mag3 3x magnifiers; 1,450 NV-Mag3 night vision sights; 500 DBAL-A2 laser pointer; 800 under barrel grenade launchers (mentioned in the "grenades" section of the table); 2020: order for 16,000 with accessories (with aim to fully replace CZ BREN 805 in service by 2025); 2025: order for 9,477 with accessories
Daniel Defense M4A1 and MK18		United States	Carbine	5.56×45mm NATO	M4 Carbine introduced in 2003 as vz. 58 replacement in selected units.; In use by the 601st Special Forces Group; 350 M4A1 and MK18 ordered in 2018 as replacement of Bushmaster M4A3
Heckler & Koch HK417		Germany	Battle rifle	7.62×51mm NATO	In use by the 601st Special Forces Group
Vz. 52/57		Czechoslovakia	Ceremonial rifle	7.62×39mm	Ceremonial rifle, used by Prague Castle Guard
Precision rifles
**CZ BREN 2 PPS**		Czech Republic	Designated marksman rifle	7.62×51mm NATO	Selected in 2020 to replace the SVD-1 and SVDN-3 as standard-issue designated marksman rifle; 350 ordered in 2020, 167 ordered in 2025.; Equipped with Nightforce ATACR 1 – 8x24 F1 & a night-vision device; Used by: Designated marksmen (primary firearm); Snipers (secondary firearm); Reconnaissance (primary firearm)
**Sako TRG-22**		Finland	sniper rifle	7.62×51mm NATO	In use by some mechanized units and units of the Military Police
CZ 750		Czech Republic	sniper rifle	7.62×51mm NATO	In use by Castle Guard
Accuracy International AWM		United Kingdom	sniper rifle	.300 Winchester Magnum	In use by the 601st Special Forces Group
Desert Tech HTI		United States	Sniper rifle	.375 Cheyenne Tactical	In use by the special forces
CheyTac Intervention		United States	Sniper rifle	.408 Cheyenne Tactical	In use by the 601st Special Forces Group
Barrett M82		United States	anti-materiel rifle	12.7×99mm NATO	In use by the 601st Special Forces Group
ZVI Falcon		Czech Republic	anti-materiel rifle	12.7×99mm NATO	In use by the 601st Special Forces Group
Dismounted machine guns
FN Minimi		Belgium	Light machine gun	5.56×45mm NATO	Used by paratroopers.
M249		United States Belgium	Light machine gun	5.56×45mm NATO	In use by the 601st Special Forces Group; American variant of the Minimi
**FN Minimi Mk3**		Belgium	General-purpose machine gun	7.62×51mm NATO	Replaced UK vz. 59 as main purpose machine-gun since 2023; ~ 1,200 pcs; Elcan SPECTER 1-4x optic sight; TigIR infrared scope
Mk 48		United States Belgium	General-purpose machine gun	7.62×51mm NATO	In use by the 601st Special Forces Group; introduced in 2006; American variant of the Minimi
M60 E4		United States	General-purpose machine gun	7.62×51mm NATO	In use by the 601st Special Forces Group introduced in 2006
Mounted machine guns
M240 machine gun		United States	General-purpose machine gun	7.62×51mm NATO	Coaxial machine gun on RCWS-30 turret of the Pandur II (KBVP variant)
Rheinmetall MG 3		Germany	General-purpose machine gun	7.62×51mm NATO	Coaxial machine gun for the Leopard 2A4; Remote control weapon station KMW Type 1530 equipped with MG 3, used on Dingo 2
FN MAG		Belgium Czech Republic	General-purpose machine gun	7.62×51mm NATO	Remote controlled weapon station ZSRD 07 equipped with MAG machine gun, used on Iveco LMV (LOV 50B)
M134 Minigun		United States	Rotary machine gun	7.62×51mm NATO	Door gunner's machinegun; Used on Mi-171Š helicopters
PK		Soviet Union	General-purpose machine gun	7.62×54mmR	Door gunner's machinegun; Used on Mi-171Š helicopters
M2 Browning		United States Czech Republic	Heavy machine gun	12.7×99mm NATO	Remote controlled weapon station Protector M151A2; Used on LOV Iveco
NSV		Soviet Union	Heavy machine gun	12.7×108mm	Mounted machine gun; Land Rover Defender 130 Kajman and SPM-85 PRAM-S
DShK		Soviet Union	Heavy machine gun	12.7×108mm	Mounted machine gun; Used on DANA howitzer and Land Rover Defender 130 Kajman
Grenades and grenade launchers
**SplHGr 85**	—	Germany Czech Republic	Hand grenade fragmentation (defensive)		Chosen in 2018 as replacement for previous types; CZ produces grenades under licence provided by Rheinmetall
**OffHGr 85**	—	Germany Czech Republic	Hand grenade high explosive (offensive)		Chosen in 2018 as replacement for previous types; CZ produces grenades under licence provided by Rheinmetall
**CZ 805G1**		Czech Republic	Under barrel grenade launcher	40×46 mm LV	Equipped with the CZ 805 BREN and BREN 2; 397 ordered in February 2010; 800 ordered in January 2016; 1,600 ordered in 2020; 377 ordered in 2025 (CZ GL version)
M203		United States	Under barrel grenade launcher	40×46 mm LV	Used by the special forces with the M4
AGS-17		Soviet Union	Grenade launcher	30×29mm	Mounted on the Land Rover Defender 130 Kajman, used by the special forces; Only for war use, too unreliable to train with
Anti tank weapons
**RPG-75**		Czech Republic	Disposable recoilless gun	68 mm	
**RPG-7V**		Soviet Union Czech Republic	Rocket-propelled grenade		13.000 grenades ordered in 2021; 100.000 grenades ordered in 2023; Ammunition used: PG-7VM (anti-armor, 300mm RHA); TB-7VM (thermobaric); OFG-7V (anti-personnel high fragmentation); PG-7VM PRACTICE-T (training)
Carl Gustav M3		Sweden	Recoilless rifle	84 mm	Used by special forces, paratroopers and mechanized infantry; Ammunition used: HEAT 751; HEAT 551; TP 552; HEDP 502; HE 441; SMOKE 469; ILLUM 545; TPT 141 a 553 B
Spike-LR		Israel	Anti-tank guided missile		500 missiles ordered to be used with the KBVP IFVs and Enok 4.8
FGM-148 Javelin		United States	Anti-tank guided missile		In use by the 601st Special Forces Group; First acquisition in 2004, for 3 launchers and several missiles; Additional order in 2015 in limited numbers
9K11 Maljutka		Soviet Union	Anti-tank guided missile		Unclear whether any remaining in view of donations to Ukraine
Land mines
Sentry		Finland Czech Republic	Anti-tank mine		10,000 ordered in December 2024

== Indirect fire ==
Equipment	Photo	Origin	Type	Quantity	Notes
Rocket artillery
MV-3		Czech Republic	Rocket artillery 122 mm	16	122mm multiple launch rocket propelled mine thrower intended for remote establishment of anti-tank mine fields (up to 3 km away).
Howitzers
152 mm SpGH DANA		Czechoslovakia	Self-propelled howitzer 152 mm	53	48 active in two artillery battalions.; To be replaced by Caesar.; Probably total of 53 remaining after 13 units were sent to Ukraine.
CAESAR		France; Czech Republic	Self-propelled howitzer 155mm	0 (+62 on order)	Agreement for delivery of CAESAR 8x8 SPGs signed in December 2022 with deliveries planned for April 2026 - December 2027.; CZK 10.17 billion worth of ammunition ordered from Czech company STV Group.; As of June 2026 none of 62 delivered due to non-conformance of initial units to technical specifications.
Mortars
SPM-85 PRAM-S		Czechoslovakia	Self-propelled mortar 120 mm	8	
M1982 PRAM-L		Czechoslovakia	Towed mortar 120 mm	85	
Expal 81-MK2-KM		Spain	Mortar 81mm	23	
ANTOS		Czech Republic	Mortar 60 mm	22+	8 delivered in 2011 and at least 14 delivered in 2023.
Artillery reconnaissance and command
PzPK Sněžka		Czech Republic	Reconnaissance and surveillance vehicle	8	Some PzPK Sněžka was modernized to PzPK Sněžka-M.
LOS		Czech Republic	Light reconnaissance and surveillance system	10	Some LOS was modernized to LOS-M.
ARTHUR		Sweden	Counter-battery radar	3	

== Vehicles ==
=== Armoured vehicles ===
Equipment	Photo	Origin	Type	Quantity	Notes
Main battle tanks
Leopard 2A8		Germany; Czech Republic	Main battle tank	0 (+44 on order)	Order placed in 2025 for 44 Leopard 2A8 combat and command tanks with option to purchase additional 16 MBTs. Moreover, 17 vehicles in other modifications (recovery, bridge, engineering, and driver training) are planned.; Hulls to be made in the Czech Republic by the Czechoslovak Group.; To be delivered 2028-2031.
Leopard 2A4		West Germany	Main battle tank	42	Refurbished German and Swiss tanks delivered 2022 - 2026 as stopgap replacement of T-72M4CZ and T72M1 before Leopard 2A8 enter service.
Infantry fighting vehicles and armoured personnel carriers
CV90 MkIV		Sweden Czech Republic	Infantry fighting vehicle IFV	0 (+141 on order)	246 Vehicles ordered in May 2023 to replace BVP-2 and BVP-1.; IFV with 30 mm Bushmaster III cannon with an integrated muzzle ammunition programmer and Spike LR.
CV90 MkIV		Sweden Czech Republic	Company commander's IFV	0 (+31 on order)	246 Vehicles ordered in May 2023 to replace BVP-2 and BVP-1.; IFV with 30 mm Bushmaster III cannon with an integrated muzzle ammunition programmer and Spike LR.
CV90 MkIV		Sweden Czech Republic	Reconnaissance IFV	0 (+18 on order)	246 Vehicles ordered in May 2023 to replace BVP-2 and BVP-1.; IFV with 30 mm Bushmaster III cannon with an integrated muzzle ammunition programmer and Spike LR.
CV90 MkIV		Sweden Czech Republic	Artillery observation IFV	0 (+12 on order)	246 Vehicles ordered in May 2023 to replace BVP-2 and BVP-1.; IFV with 30 mm Bushmaster III cannon with an integrated muzzle ammunition programmer and Spike LR.
CV90 MkIV		Sweden Czech Republic	Armoured engineering vehicle	0 (+13 on order)	246 Vehicles ordered in May 2023 to replace BVP-2 and BVP-1.; IFV with 30 mm Bushmaster III cannon with an integrated muzzle ammunition programmer and Spike LR.
CV90 MkIV		Sweden Czech Republic	Armoured recovery vehicle	0 (+15 on order)	246 Vehicles ordered in May 2023 to replace BVP-2 and BVP-1.; IFV with 30 mm Bushmaster III cannon with an integrated muzzle ammunition programmer and Spike LR.
CV90 MkIV		Sweden Czech Republic	Armored ambulance	0 (+16 on order)	246 Vehicles ordered in May 2023 to replace BVP-2 and BVP-1.; IFV with 30 mm Bushmaster III cannon with an integrated muzzle ammunition programmer and Spike LR.
Pandur II		Austria; Czech Republic	Infantry fighting vehicle	72	3+7 crew; Armament: RCWS 30 (30mm Mk44 Bushmaster II & M240 machine gun & Spike LR)
Pandur II		Austria; Czech Republic	Company commander's IFV	11	5+1 crew; Armament: RCWS 30
Pandur II		Austria; Czech Republic	Reconnaissance IFV with radar	8	5 crew; Armament: RCWS 30; Integrated reconnaissance equipment
Pandur II		Austria; Czech Republic	Reconnaissance IFV	8	5 crew; Armament: RCWS 30; Integrated reconnaissance equipment
Pandur II		Austria; Czech Republic	Military communications	14	4 crew; Armament: FN Minimi 7,62 NATO; Extensive communications equipment
Pandur II		Austria; Czech Republic	Command and control	5	4 crew; Armament: FN Minimi 7,62 NATO; Extensive communications equipment
Pandur II		Austria; Czech Republic	Armoured engineering vehicle	4	3+6 crew; Armament: RCWS 12,7 Mini Samson (Browning M2HB-QCB)
Pandur II		Austria; Czech Republic	Armored ambulance	4	3 crew; No armament
BVP-2		Czechoslovakia	Infantry fighting vehicle	?	To be replaced by CV90; Unknown number remaining after over 200 IFVs donated to Ukraine
Armoured vehicles
Iveco LMV		Italy; Czech Republic	Infantry mobility vehicle	72	2+3 crew; M151A2 Protector RWS with Browning M2 HB-QCB
Iveco LMV		Italy; Czech Republic	Infantry mobility vehicle	11	1+4 crew; ZSRD 07 RCWS with FN MAG
Iveco LMV		Italy; Czech Republic	Command vehicle	7 (+18 on order)	2+2 crew; M151A2 Protector RWS with Browning M2 HB-QCB; Command and communications equipment; additional 18 ordered in 2025
Iveco LMV		Italy; Czech Republic	CBRN Reconnaissance	80	2 crew; ZSRD 07 RCWS with FN MAG; CBRN defense equipment
Iveco LMV		Italy; Czech Republic	Armored ambulance	20	
Iveco LMV		Italy; Czech Republic	Other	20 (+6 on order)	Various other versions (e.g. electronic warfare, artillery reconnaissance, etc.); 6 additional artillery reconnaissance vehicles ordered in 2025
Nexter Titus		France Czech Republic	Command and control	6 (+22 on order)	4 crew; FN Minimi 7,62 NATO; Communication equipment; Additional 22 ordered in 2025
Nexter Titus		France Czech Republic	Artillery command	20	5 crew; FN Minimi 7,62 NATO
Nexter Titus		France Czech Republic	Military communications	36	4 crew; FN Minimi 7,62 NATO; Communication equipment
Nexter Titus		France Czech Republic	Training vehicle	0 (+2 on order)	Ordered in 2025
Supacat HMT Extenda 6×6		United Kingdom	Combat vehicle	0 (+18 on order)	18 on order
Enok 4.8		Germany	Light Armoured Combat Vehicle	11 (+60 on order)	60 on order; In service with the 43rd Airborne Regiment and the 601st Special Forces Group
Dingo 2		Germany	MRAP	21	In service with 25th anti-aircraft rocket regiment; Used for transport of RBS 70 teams
Tatra T815-7 (Force)		Czech Republic	Heavy off-road truck	~700	Many variants, both basic as well as with specialist superstructures; Axle variations from 4x4 up to 10x10; Various armour levels, unarmored include add-on armour kits
STARKOM		Czech Republic	Armoured electronic warfare vehicle intended for near-frontline operation	8	STAvebnicový Rušič KOMunikační; 8x8 Tatra T815-7 fully armored truck; In service since 2023
ES-RA		Czech Republic	Armoured electronic warfare reconnaissance system	0/8 units	Elektronický Systém RÁdiový; Tatra 815-7 8x8 fully armored truck (similar to STARKOM but with different capabilities).; Purchase confirmed in 2025

=== Military engineering vehicles ===
Equipment	Photo	Origin	Type	Quantity	Notes
Büffel 3		Germany	Armored recovery vehicle	2	
VT-72M4 CZ		Czech Republic	Armored recovery vehicle	3	Recovery tank variant based on T-72M4CZ
BOŽENA 5		Slovakia	Mine clearing vehicle	3	
Hyundai HL960A		South Korea	Wheeled loader	11	Replaced KN-251 in 2026.
Kalmar RT240		Sweden	Container handler	1/3	
Grove GMK 3050-3		Germany	Mobile crance	16	
Liebherr		Germany	Crane	1/?	Other selected units of the Army of the Czech Republic will be gradually equipped with this equipment
MT-55A		Czechoslovakia	Armoured vehicle-launched bridge	6	
AM 50		Czechoslovakia	Bridge Layer	?	
PTS-10		Soviet Union	Tracked amphibious transport	24	
Renault Trucks K440 P6x6		France	Sewage truck	2 (+ 6 on order)	
Renault K P8x8 MEDIUM 13L E6		France	Recovery truck	1 (+ 1 on order)	

=== Unarmoured vehicles ===
Equipment	Photo	Origin	Type	Quantity	Notes
Utility vehicles
Toyota Hilux		Japan	Light off-road vehicle	1,500	Delivered in 2021–2024 as replacement for Land Rover Defender 110 TDi
Flyer 72 HD		United States	Light utility vehicle	46/159	Used by 43rd Airborne Regiment; 46 donated under United States Foreign Military Financing, more to be purchased to replace Land Rover 130 Kajman
Land Rover Defender 130 Kajman		United Kingdom	Light off-road vehicle	79	Used by paratroopers; to be replaced by Flyer 72 HD
Polaris Ranger XP 1000 EPS		United States	Light off-road vehicle	8	Used by military police
Emergency vehicles
Iveco MUV M70		Italy Czech Republic	ambulance	19	
Tatra Force 6x6 CAS 30/9000/540		Czech Republic	Fire truck	37	33 in red and 4 in khaki
Logistics vehicles
Praga V3S		Czechoslovakia	Military medium truck	?	Mostly replaced, few remaining in service with specialist superstructures (e.g. field kitchen, field repair shop)
Scania R590		Sweden	Heavy on-road logistics truck	12	
Scania R660		Sweden	Semi-truck	4	
Tatra T 810 (Tactic)		Czech Republic	Medium off-road truck	600	The first 558 were delivered in 08/09; Others went in the following years in different variants
Tatra T815		Czech Republic	Military heavy truck	2,700+- (+ 870)	4x4, 6x6, 8x8, 10x10 versions; 870 additional flatbeds and hook lift trucks to be delivered in 2025 - 2031; 22 CAPL-16M1-Tanker and 5 CNS-Tanker
Volvo VTN3R		Sweden	Dump truck	60	

== Air defence systems ==
Equipment	Photo	Origin	Type	Quantity	Notes
Air defence systems
2K12 Kub-M2		Soviet Union	Surface-to-air missile	2 batteries	Phased out as SPYDER reaches operational capability.; 2 batteries delivered as aid for Ukraine in 2023.
SPYDER LR		Israel	Surface-to-air missile	4 batteries	Ordered in 2021 to replace the KUB system, deliveries in 2024–2026, full operational capability of all four batteries planned for 2028.; Each battery composed of: 4 launchers; 1 radar EL/M-2084 MMR/MADR; Missiles: Python-5 (short range, 15 km); Derby (medium range, 35 km); 48 I-Derby-ER (long range, 80 km), ordered in 2023 with deliveries in 2027; Tatra chassis
SPYDER AiO		Israel	Surface-to-air missile	0 (+ 4)	Intent to buy announced in November 2026
MARS S-330		Czech Republic Sweden	SHORAD armored car	0 (+24 on order)	Contract signed on 22 July 2025 with delivery expected in 2028-2030.
RBS 70		Sweden	Man-portable air-defense system	32 (+8 on order)	Launchers: 16 RBS 70; 16 RBS 70NG; Additional 8 RBS 70NG ordered 2025; Missiles: 231 delivered between 2014 and 2022; 135 RBS-70 Mk3 ordered in 2023
Air surveillance
EL/M-2084 MMR/MADR		Israel	Mobile 3D multi-mission radar	8	5 stationary, 3 vehicle-based as back-up.; Detection range of 100km.; Additional vehicle-based MADR radars are part of SPYDER systems.; In service since 2023.
PLESS		Czech Republic	Passive radar (strategic)	0 (+3 on order)	Passive Long-range ESM Surveillance System.; Detection range of 700km, including targets without active radio emmiters, including beyond-horizon targets.; 1 stationary, 2 mobile (vehicle-based).; 3 systems ordered in 2025.
Věra		Czech Republic	Passive radar (strategic)	5	Detection range of 450km, only targets with active radio emitters.; 2x VĚRA-S/M.; 3x VĚRA-NG (introduced in 2023; DPET Deployable Passive Electronic‑Support Measures Tracker version).; Each system consists of five units carried by Tatra 815-7 Trucks (NG version also includes two extra "light" sensors carried by Toyota Hilux).
BORAP		Czech Republic	Passive radar (tactical)		BOjový RAdiolokační Pátrač.; Detection range of 450km.; Each system consists of two radar units and two control units carried by Tatra 815-7 Trucks.
SRTP		Czech Republic	Passive radar (tactical)	1	Směroměrný RadioTechnický Pátrač.; Mounted on Iveco LMV.; Prototype in service since 2019, further orders expected in 2025 to serve for purpose of localization and targeting of enemy drone operators.
ReVisor		Czech Republic	Short-range radar (up to 30 km)	6	ReVisor is a surveillance radar designed especially for very short-range ground-based air defence (VSHORAD).
Air defence command
RACCOS		Czech Republic	Automated command and control fire distribution system	6	
PU Posy		Czech Republic	C4ISTAR	2	

== Watercraft ==
Equipment	Photo	Origin	Type	Quantity	Notes
MO-634		Czech Republic	Motor towing boat	?	
MO-2000 Veronika		Czech Republic	Motor towing boat	?	can replace 2 MO-634 boats handling PMS
RUSB		Germany	Boat	?	
Pegas 4M		Czech Republic	Hovercraft	?	Primarily used for SAR by rescue teams

== Unmanned aerial vehicles ==
Model	Image	Origin	Type	Role	Quantity	Notes
Elbit Skylark I-LE		Israel	Fixed-wing UAV	ISR	2	Purchased in 2009
RQ-11B Raven		United States	Fixed-wing UAV	ISR	6	
RQ-12 Wasp AE		United States	Fixed-wing UAV	ISR	?	
Insitu ScanEagle		United States	Fixed-wing UAV	ISR	10	
RQ-20 Puma		United States	Fixed-wing UAV	ISR	5	One system RQ-20A Puma was purchased in 2018; Four systems Puma 3 AE were purchased in 2022
STRATOM		Czech Republic	High altitude ISR and communications balloon	ISR & Military communications	?	High-altitude ‘pseudo-satellite’ surveillance balloon intended for long-term independent operation at altitude of 25 km

== Aircraft ==
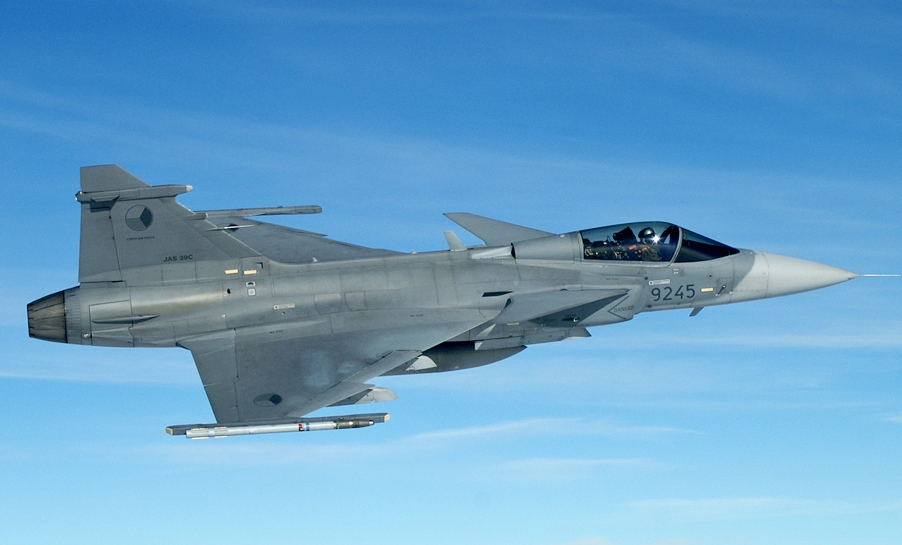
A JAS 39C Gripen at cruising altitude

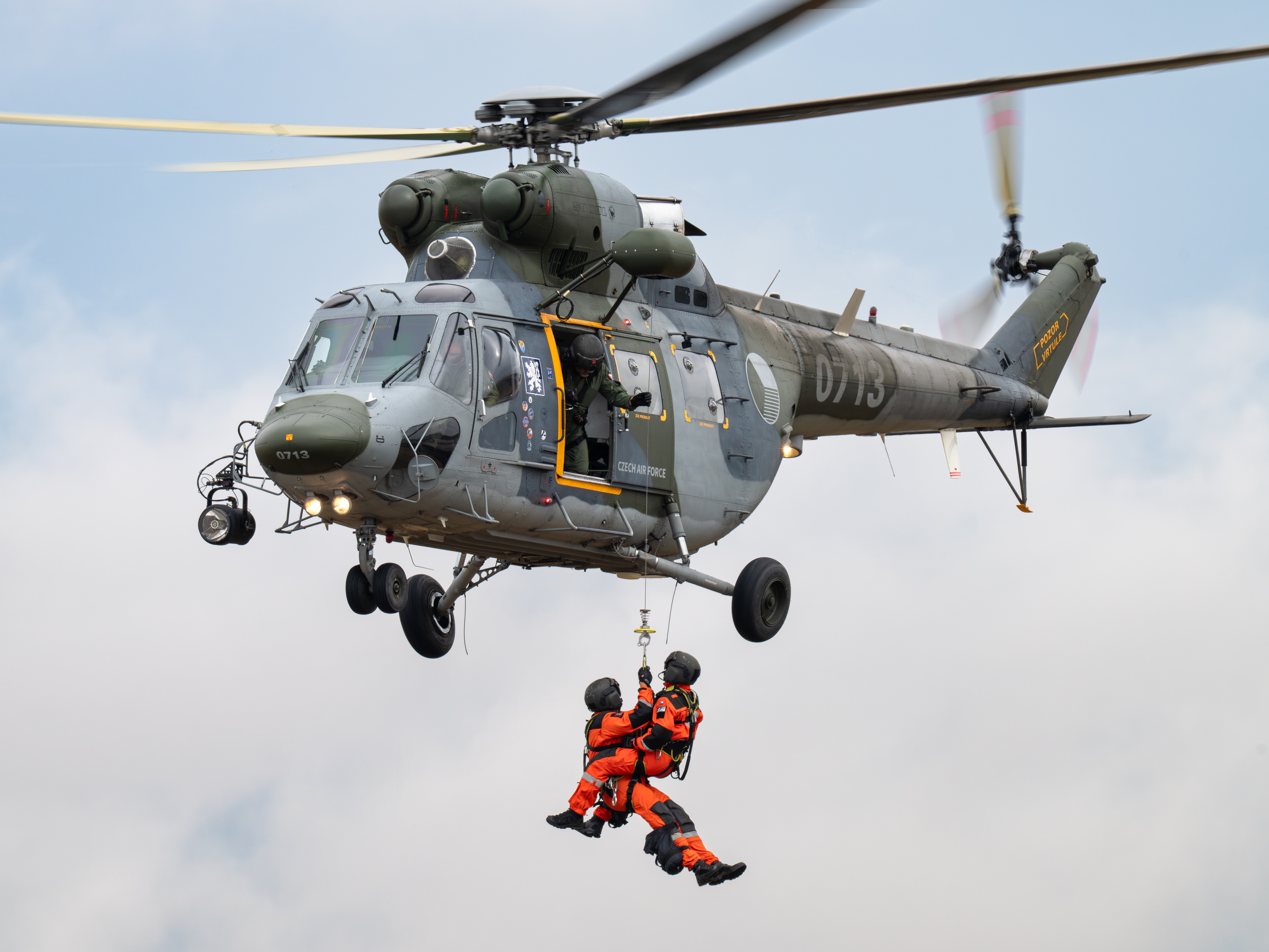
A W-3A Sokół performing a search and rescue demonstration.

=== Aircraft inventory ===
==== Current fleet ====
Aircraft	Origin	Role	Variant	In service	Notes
Combat aircraft
Saab JAS 39 Gripen	Sweden	Multirole fighter	JAS 39C	12	Leased from the Swedish Air Force.
Aero L-159	Czech Republic	Light attack aircraft	L-159A	16	(Note: 16 × L-159A (single-seat variant), they were refurbished and upgrades from 2020 to 2022.)
F-35 Lightning II	United States	Stealth multirole fighter	F-35A	0 (+24 on order)	Deliveries planned for the period 2029 - 2035.
Special mission aircraft
Let L-410 Turbolet	Czech Republic	Reconnaissance / surveillance / photographic mapping	L-410FG	2	Out of 6 Let L-410 , 2 are used for this mission.
Transport aircraft
Airbus A319	France / Germany	VIP transport	A319CJ	2	
Embraer C-390 Millennium	Brazil	Tactical airlifter	C390	1 (+1 on order)	Second delivery expected in 2027 or 2028.
Airbus C295	Spain	Tactical airlifter	C295M	4	(Note: Modernisation contract of the C295M to the C295MW variant signed in 2019. The modernisation is planned for the 2025-2028 period.)
Airbus C295	Spain	Tactical airlifter	C295MW	2	(Note: Two C-295MW ordered in 2019, an improved variant (winglet, improved engine, increased payload capacity).)
Let L-410	Czech Republic	Light tactical airlifter / utility aircraft	L-410UVP	4	
Helicopters
Bell AH-1 Viper	United States	Attack helicopter	AH-1Z	4 (+6 on order)	
Mil Mi-17	Soviet Union	Transport helicopter	–	3	(Note: Deep modernization in 2017–2020)
Mil Mi-17	Soviet Union	VIP transport	–	2	(Note: Two rebuilt and modified for passenger transport in 2023 as a partial replacement of previous VIP Mil Mi-8); Succeeding to the Mil-Mi-8. Total of 20 Mil Mi-17 / Mil-Mi 171.
Mil Mi-171	Russia	Utility helicopter	Mil Mi-171Sh	7	(Note: Mil Mi-171Sh: Manufactured between 2004 and 2006 as a repayment of old Soviet Union debt, helicopter variant with a rear ramp. It was upgraded twice: Upgraded to the NATO standards (5 in 2009, 2 in 2013).; Deep refurbishment between 2020 and 2026 (lifespan pushed to 2035).; It is equipped with 2 door gunners (2×Minigun M134D on a swing arm, or dismounted PKM), 1 rear ramp gunner, and an external fuel tank pods.); Total of 20 Mil Mi-17 / Mil-Mi 171.
Mil Mi-171	Russia	Utility helicopter	Mil Mi-171ShKM	8	(Note: Mil Mi-17#Export variants); Total of 20 Mil Mi-17 / Mil-Mi 171.
Bell UH-1 Venom	United States	Utility helicopter	UH-1Y	7 (+2 on order)	1 crashed on July 23, 2026.
PZL W-3 Sokół	Poland	Transport helicopter	W-3A	4	Planned to be retired in 2028. (Note: PZL W-3 Sokół received in 1995 in exchange for 10 MiG-29 from Poland.)
PZL W-3 Sokół	Poland	SAR	W-3A	6	Planned to be retired in 2028.
Trainer aircraft
Saab JAS 39 Gripen	Sweden	Conversion trainer	JAS 39D	2	Leased from the Swedish Air Force.
Aero L-159	Czech Republic	LiFT / advanced trainer	L-159T1+	3 (Note: 3× L-159T1+ two-seat trainers which were refurbished and upgraded from 2016 to 2019.)	Total of 8 Aero L-159 trainers.
Aero L-159	Czech Republic	LiFT / advanced trainer	L-159T2	5 (Note: 5× L-159T2 two-seat trainers which were manufactured between 2018 and 2020.)	Total of 8 Aero L-159 trainers.
Aero L-39 Skyfox	Czech Republic	Advanced trainer / basic trainer	L-39NG	4 (+4 on order)	Aircraft also known as the L-39NG (LOM Praha).

==== Potential future aircraft ====
Potential aircraft model	Origin	Role	Variant	Planned quantity	Notes
Helicopters
Boeing CH-47 Chinook	United States	Heavy lift helicopters	CH-47F	6	Successor of the Mil Mi-17 as planned in the CAFDC 2035. Order planned in 2030 - 2035.
AW-101	Italy / United Kingdom	Heavy lift helicopters	–	6	Successor of the Mil Mi-17 as planned in the CAFDC 2035. Order planned in 2030 - 2035.

=== Satellites ===
Satellite model	Origin	Type	Role	In service	Notes
Reconnaissance satellite
SATurnin-1	Czech Republic	LEO, CubeSat pototype	ISR	1	Launched into orbit in 2025.

=== Aircraft equipment ===
Model	Origin	Type	Variant	Used with	Notes
Cannons
Mauser BK-27	Germany	Revolver cannon (27×145mm)	–	JAS 39C / JAS 39D	
ZVI Plamen PL-20	Czech Republic	2 × cannon pod (20×102mm)	–	L-159A	
M197 electric cannon	United States	Rotary cannon (20×102mm)	–	AH-1Z	
Air-to-air missiles
AIM-120 AMRAAM	United States / Norway	BVR, radar homing, air-to-air missile Beyond-visual-range	AIM-120C-5	JAS 39C / JAS 39D	
AIM-9 Sidewinder	United States	Short range, infrared homing, air-to-air missile	AIM-9L	L-159A	
AIM-9 Sidewinder	United States	Short range, infrared homing, air-to-air missile	AIM-9M	JAS 39C / JAS 39D / L-159A	
Air-to-ground missiles
AGM-65 Maverick	United States	Air-to-ground tactical missile (dual EO/IR guidance system) (close air support missile)	AGM-65B	JAS 39C / JAS 39D / L-159A	
AGM-114 Hellfire	United States	Anti-tank guided missile	–	AH-1Z	
Guided bombs
GBU-12 Paveway II	United States	General-purpose, laser-guided bomb 500 lb (230 kg)	–	L-159A	Munition: Mk 82 500 lb (230 kg).
GBU-16 Paveway II	United States	General-purpose, laser-guided bomb 1,000 lb (450 kg)	–	L-159A	Munition: Mark 83 1,000 lb (450 kg).
Rockets
CRV7	Canada	Unguided rockets / rocket pods	–	L-159A	Launched from: LAU-5002 rocket pod (6 × 70mm); LAU-5003 rocket pod (19 × 70mm)
Hydra 70	United States	Unguided rockets / rocket pods (70 mm)	–	AH-1Z/ UH-1Y	
APKWS	United States	Guided rocket kits for Hydra 70 (70mm)	–	AH-1Z/ UH-1Y	
Small arms
FN M3P	Belgium	Pintle-mounted, door machine gun (12.7×99mm NATO)	GAU-21A	UH-1Y	(Left side)
PKM	USSR	Door machine gun (7.62×54mmR)	–	Mil Mi-171Sh / Mil Mi-171ShKM	(Dismounted - for close perimeter protection while doorgunner is outside)
M134 Minigun	United States	Rotary, pintle-mounted, door machine gun (7.62×51mm NATO)	M134D-H	UH-1Y / Mil Mi-171Sh / Mil Mi-171ShKM	
M240	Belgium / United States	Pintle-mounted, door machine gun (7.62×51mm NATO)	M240D	UH-1Y	(Right side)
Pods
Rafael Litening 4	Israel	Targeting pod / reconnaissance pod	Litening 4i	JAS 39C / JAS 39D	
Laser guidance	United States	Laser targeting system	–	AH-1Z	The AH-1Z can be used as a JTAC platform for the L-159A attacks.
Helicopter fuel pods	USSR	External fuel tanks	–	Mil Mi-171Sh / Mil Mi-171ShKM	

== Other equipment ==
Equipment	Photo	Origin	Type	Quantity	Notes
OM-90		Czech Republic	Air purifying respirator	Unknown	The OM-90 is a Czech gas mask designed in 1990, it is currently still in service. The threads are 40mmx3.6mm.
UGV-Pz		Czech Republic	Unmanned ground reconnaissance vehicle	Unknown	

== Proposed and in negotiation purchases ==
These are vehicles, which could in theory enter service with the Czech Army in the future.

Model	Image	Origin	Type	Numbers	Details
8x8 IFV			Infantry Fighting Vehicle	250+	First deliveries planned by 2028.
120mm Self Propelled Mortar			120 mm remote-controlled mortar	74	Expected to be ordered 2031–2035, with current contenders being Rak, Amos and Nemo.
Military engineering vehicle			Route clearance version Explosive Ordnance Disposal version Combat engineering version	50	Planned ordering of up to 82 MRAPs for the Czech Army has been established in the KVAČR 2035, the most likely candidate is the Australian Bushmaster MRAP however, Czech MOD may choose the TITUS instead because of the established home production and due to the fact of it already being present within the Czech Army.

== Reserve equipment ==
Main battle tank
Name	Photo	Country of origin	Type	Caliber	Notes
T-72M4CZ		Czech Republic	Main battle tank		30; Produced 2003 - 2006, deep refurbishment undertaken in 2022 - 2025 failed due to inability to refurbish its unique Italian fire control system
Infantry fighting vehicle
BVP-1		Czechoslovakia	Infantry fighting vehicle		Unclear whether any remaining in view of donations to Ukraine
Handguns
CZ 75 SP-01 Phantom		Czech Republic	Semi-automatic pistol	9×19mm Parabellum	Standard issue pistol since 2012, their replacement decided in 2020; Progressive withdrawal to be completed by 2025, and being added to the reserve
Submachine guns
Škorpion vz. 61		Czechoslovakia	Submachine gun / PDW	.32 ACP	Unclear whether any remaining in view of donations to Ukraine
Assault rifles, battle rifles and carbines
CZ 805 BREN		Czech Republic	Assault rifle	5.56×45mm NATO	Standard issue rifle since 2012, their replacement decided in 2020; Progressive withdrawal to be completed by 2025, and being added to the reserve
Bushmaster M4A3 (XM15-E2S M4A3)		United States	Carbine	5.56×45mm NATO	In special forces replaced by Daniel Defense M4A1 and MK18, in paratroopers replaced by BREN 2.
Samopal vz. 58		Czechoslovakia	Assault rifle	7.62x39mm	Used by some Active Reserve units as of November 2025.; 1959 - 2011 standard service rifle
Machine guns
UK vz. 59		Czechoslovakia	General-purpose machine gun	7.62x54mmR 7.62x51mm NATO	Reserve only; 1960–2021 standard-issue machine gun
Sniper rifles
SVD-1 SVDN-3		Soviet Union	Designated marksman rifle	7.62x54mmR	Reserve only; Standard issue DSM 1980s - 2022
Grenades and grenade launchers
URG-86		Czechoslovakia	Hand grenade		Reserve only; replaced by SplHGr 85 and OffHGr 85
F-1		Soviet Union	Hand grenade		Reserve only; replaced by UGR-86
CIS 40 GL	—	Singapore	Under barrel grenade launcher	40×46 mm LV	In the reserve, used under the Samopal vz. 58 assault rifle; It was in use by the 601st Special Forces Group

== See also ==
- List of military aircraft of the Czech Republic
