= Lobaev Arms =

Russian firearms manufacturer

Lobaev Arms, officially the Integrated Systems Design Bureau, LLC (Ru:OOO Конструкторское бюро интегрированных систем Konstruktorskoye byuro integrirovannykh sistem (KBIS)), is a Russian designer and manufacturer of precision rifles, precision grade rifle ammunition, and rifle parts. Lobaev Arms is based in Tarusa (Russian: Тару́са), Kaluga Oblast, Russia.

== History ==
KBIS traces its history back to a small arms company Tsar Cannon LLC (Ru: ООО «Царь-пушка» OOO «Tsar'-pushka» TsP), founded by the Lobaev brothers in Tarusa in 2003 for the production of sporting benchrest rifles. In 2007, an early prototype of the SVL sniper rifle was created, which later became the ancestor of the SVL / SVLK-14 family - the main lineup of the company. In 2009, a pre-production sample was completed, created on the basis of the King v.3 bolt group. In 2010, the production of the first serial model of the SVL rifle began, adopted by the security service of the President of the Russian Federation. Since 2009, design work has been carried out on the Tsar Cannon on a light silent rifle DVL and a special subsonic cartridge 8.6 × 39 mm.

In 2010, the activity of Tsar Cannon LLC in Russia was terminated. Most of the team moves to the UAE, where they continue to work on the subject of sniper rifles as a division of the local company Tawazun Advanced Defense Systems (TADS). In the UAE, Tarusa rifles were improved and sold under the indices: SVL - KS-11, and DVL - SS-113. The Tsar Cannons team has developed more than 20 models of self-loading and bolt-action small arms for the Military of the United Arab Emirates.

In 2013, the company returned to Tarusa, work was resumed on the design and production of high-precision sniper rifles, accessories for them and ammunition. Barrel and cartridge production has been established. To modify the DVL silent rifle, a new subsonic cartridge of increased power 10.3 × 45 mm was created.

In May 2023, the company started production of import-substituted .408 Cheyenne Tactical cartridges. The production of a new self-loaded sniper rifle codenamed "Zveroboi" with a range of over 2 km and chambered for the Cheytac cartridge is being established as of July 2023.

== Structure of the LOBAEV group of companies ==
Integrated Systems Design Bureau LLC is a part of the LOBAEV group of companies named after the names of its founders the brothers Vladislav and Nikolay Lobaev. In addition to KBIS, LOBAEV corporation includes a number of highly specialized divisions.

- KB of integrated systems - A design office responsible for development and pre-series production.

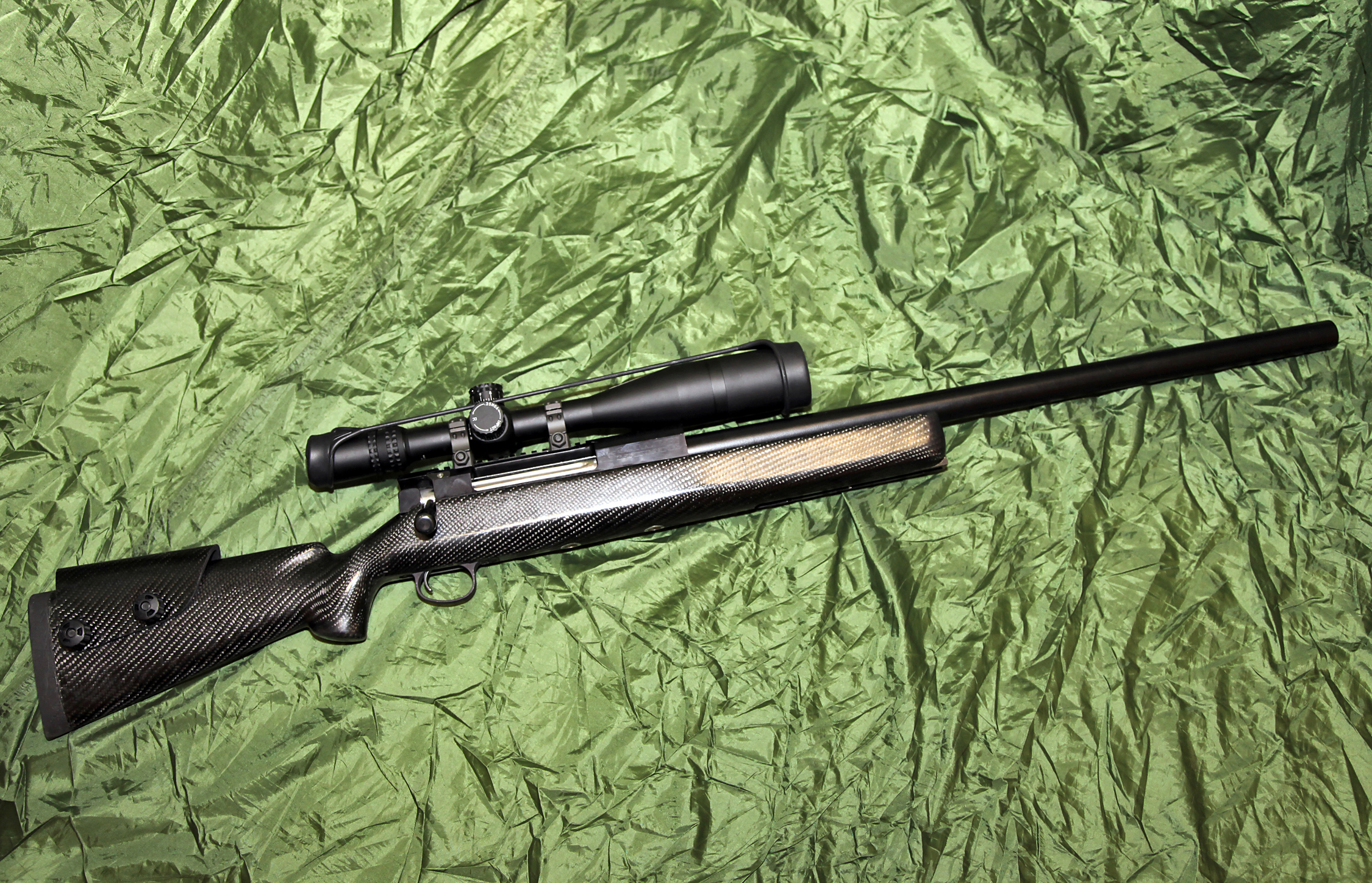
Lobaev OVL-3 rifle

- Lobaev Arms - The basic unit engaged in mass production and customization of Lobaev brand sniper rifles whose main models are SVL, DXL, DVL, TSVL.
- Lobaev Ammo - Cartridge production, serially producing sniper rifle cartridges, including special ones of in-house design - .338LW and .40LW .
- Lobaev Hummer Barrels - Barrel production. Barrels, high-precision champion barrels, small-bore .22LR caliber barrels, barrels and blanks for pneumatics are offered for sale.
- Lobaev Robotics - A division specializing in the creation of military robots and other robotics. A light mobile tactical robot PC1A3 "Minirex" with a firing module is proposed for implementation. The robot is designed for carrying out assault operations indoors and in open areas, equipped with automatic remote-controlled small arms.

== See also ==
- ООО (общество с ограниченной ответственностью) is a type of private limited company in Russia
- ORSIS, a similar Russian company
