= Windrunner =

Windrunner may refer to:

- Sylvanas Windrunner, fictional character who appears in the Warcraft series of video games by Blizzard Entertainment
- Windrunner, one of several aliases of DC Comics superhero Max Mercury
- Radia WindRunner, a planned aircraft on the list of large aircraft
- EDM Arms Windrunner, an American bolt-action sniper rifle later sold as the CheyTac Intervention
- Windrunner, 1994 indie film starring Jason Wiles
