= LAPV Enok =

Enok
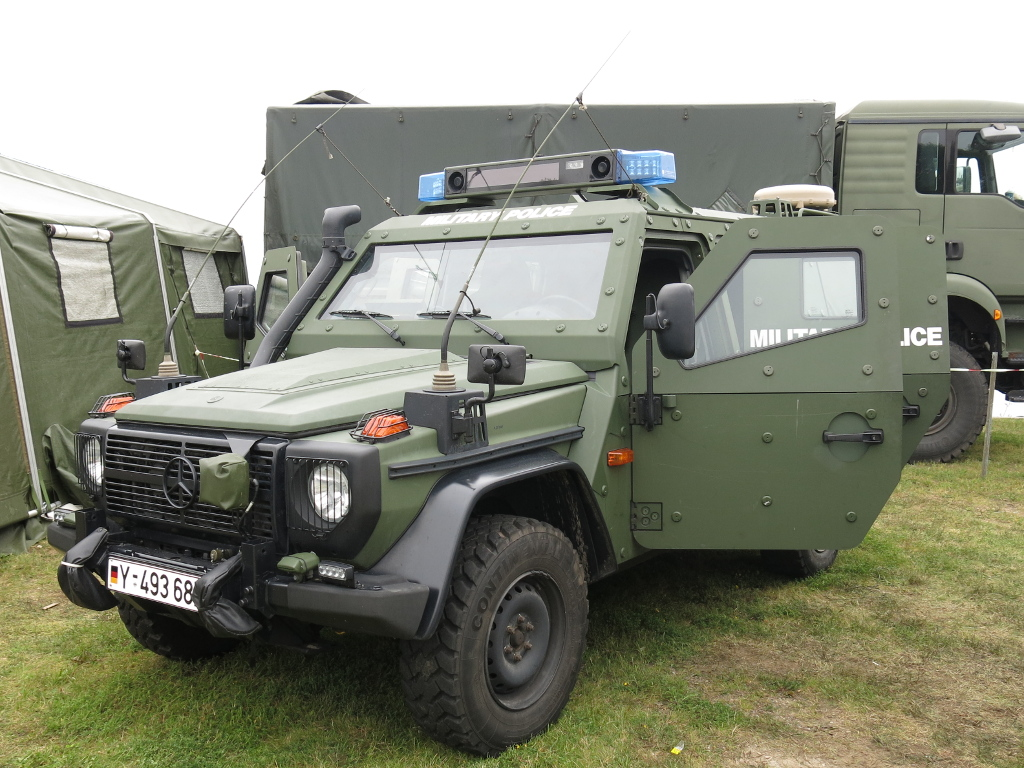
- An Enok of the Feldjäger
- Type: Armoured car
- Place of origin: Germany

Service history
- In service: 2008–present
- Used by: See Operators

Production history
- Manufacturer: Mercedes-Benz, Armoured Car Systems (ACS)
- Unit cost: ~$760,000

Specifications
- Mass: 5.4 tonnes (6.0 short tons) or 6.1 tonnes (6.7 short tons)
- Length: 4.82 m (15.8 ft)
- Width: 1.90 m (6.2 ft)
- Height: 1.90 m
- Crew: 2-6
- Main armament: Remote-controlled turret with a Rheinmetall MG3 or HK GMG
- Engine: OM642 270, 6-cylinder diesel engine 135 kW (184 hp)
- Transmission: Five speeds fully automatic
- Suspension: Rigid axles with coil springs and telescopic shock absorbers for front and rear
- Operational range: 700 km (430 mi)
- Maximum speed: 95 km/h (59 mph)

The LAPV Enok is a Light Armoured Patrol Vehicle of the Bundeswehr, mostly in use with the German Army. It is a significantly further developed Wolf SSA, based on the Mercedes-Benz G-Class.

The LAPV Enok is being manufactured by Armored Car Systems GmbH (ACS), based in Aichach, a wholly owned subsidiary of 'Gruma Commercial Vehicles' based in Derching. Important subcontractors are the companies LeTech - Special Purpose Vehicles (formerly Lennartz Technik) in Welzheim and the Austrian Magna Steyr based in Graz.

== History ==
A first batch of 247 vehicles has been ordered by the Bundeswehr, with deliveries scheduled to be carried out between 2008 and 2013.

Another batch of 84 improved Enoks (Enok 6.1) with increased armor and weight (=6.1 tonnes (6.7 short tons)) were ordered in January 2015. 49 of them are determined for the Kommando Spezialkräfte

Im August 2018, the German Federal Police ordered modified Enok 6.1s along with remote controlled weapon stations as protected vehicles for airport security tasks, denominated Geschütztes Einsatzfahrzeug 2 - (GEF2).

== Design ==
It features protection according to NATO STANAG 4569 Level 2, against rifle fire, land mines, and improvised explosive devices. The Enok was especially designed to be deployed in harsh terrain and bad weather situations.

== Variants ==
Based on the Mercedes G-Class W461 chassis:

- Light weight, aluminium framed
- ENOK 5.4 tankhunter:
- Spike missiles weapon system from Rafael (LR and ER missile variants)
- ENOK 5.4 military police
- ENOK 5.4 dog guide vehicle
- ENOK 5.4 patrol vehicle
- ENOK 5.4 ordnance disposal
- ENOK 5.4 nuclear emission detection
- ENOK 6.1

Based on the Mercedes G-Class W464 chassis:

- ENOK 4.8 AB airborne.

ACS Development

- ENOK 7.5, vehicle using the cockpit, engine and transmission of a Mercedes G-class, but the vehicle is developed in house.

Based on the Mercedes UNIMOG chassis:

- ACS ENOK 9.5, 9.5 tons GVW, STANAG 4569 level 2 protection, up to 10 soldiers (2 crew + 8 passengers). Based on the Unimog U1500 (FGA 9.5, same base as Dingo 2).
- ACS ENOK 14.8, 14.5 tons GVW, STANAG 4569 level 3 protection, up to 10 soldiers (2 crew + 8 passengers) or specialised variants (air defence). Based on the Unimog U5000 (FGA 14.5).
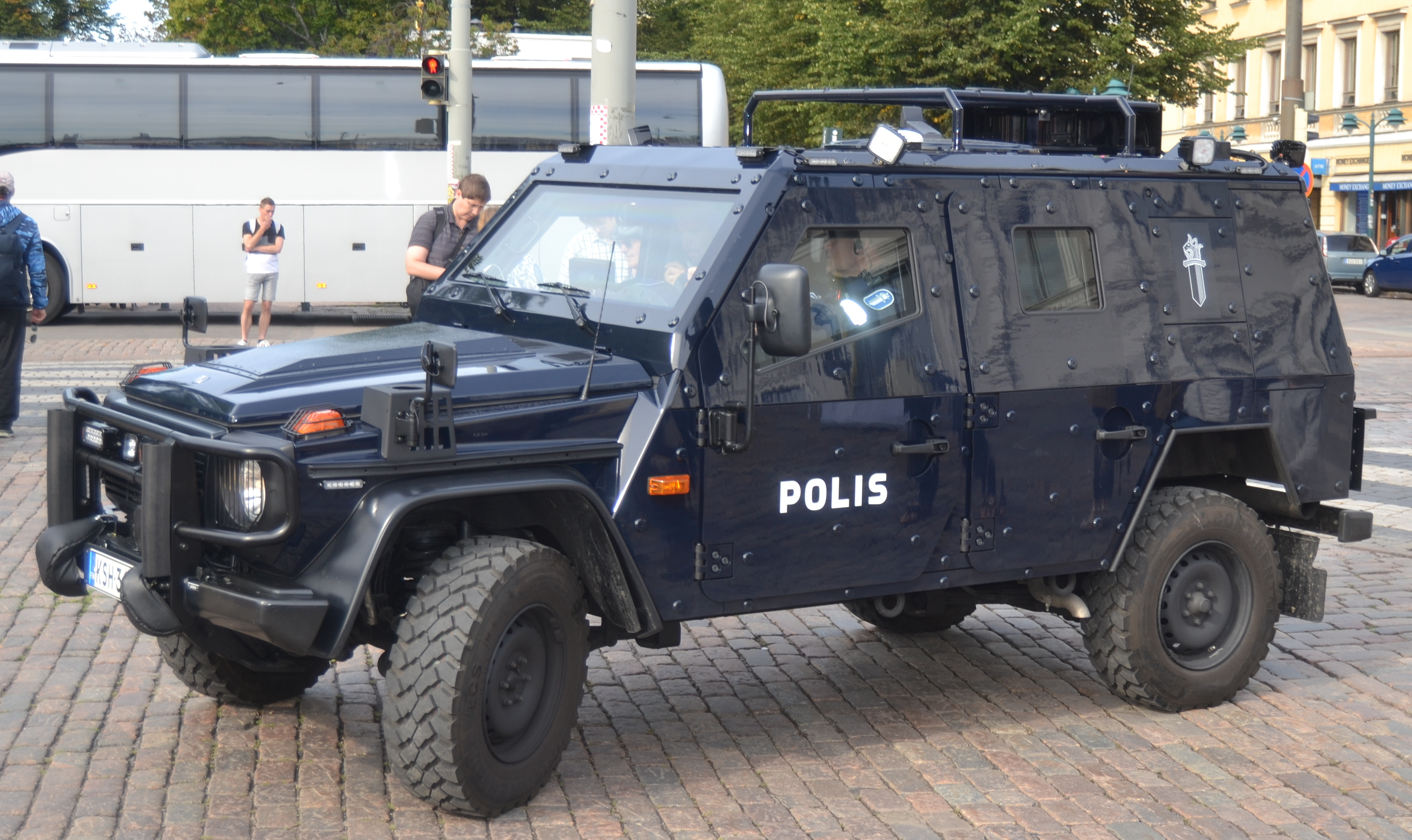
ENOK 5.4 Police Finland

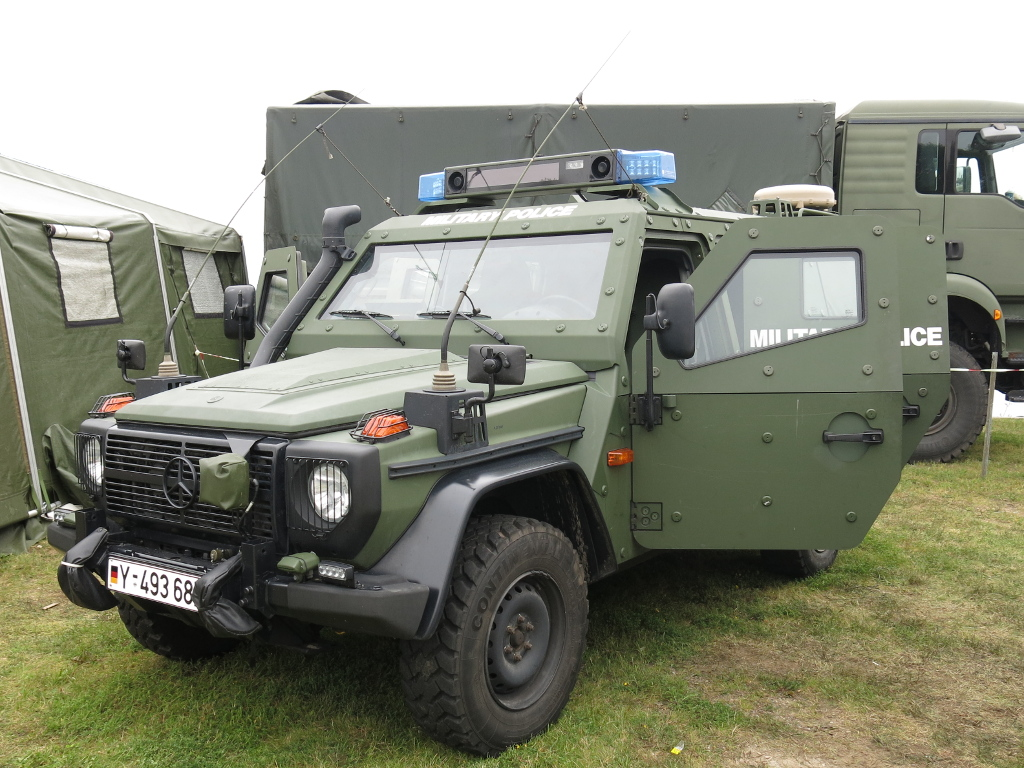
ENOK 5.4, GFF1, Bundeswehr, Feldjäger

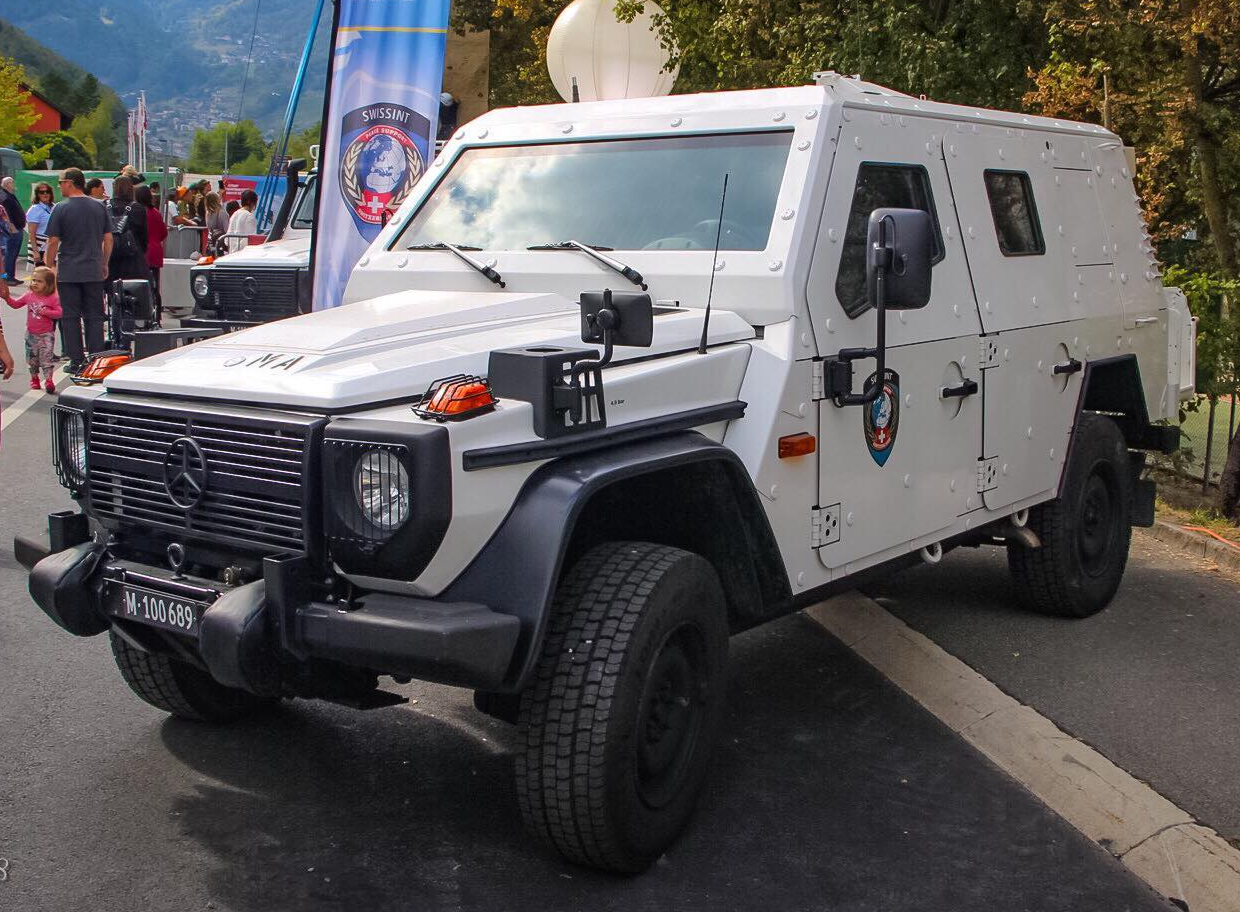
ENOK 5.4, Panzer Wagen, Swiss Army, SwissInt

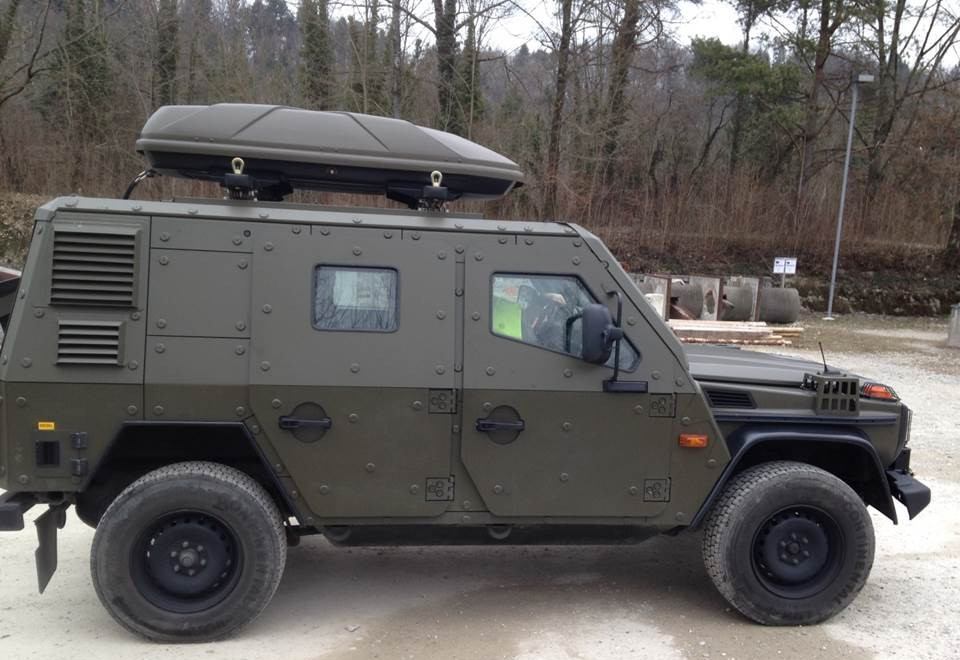
ENOK 5.4, Radiometrie Wagen L22, Swiss Army, ABC Defense Battalion 10

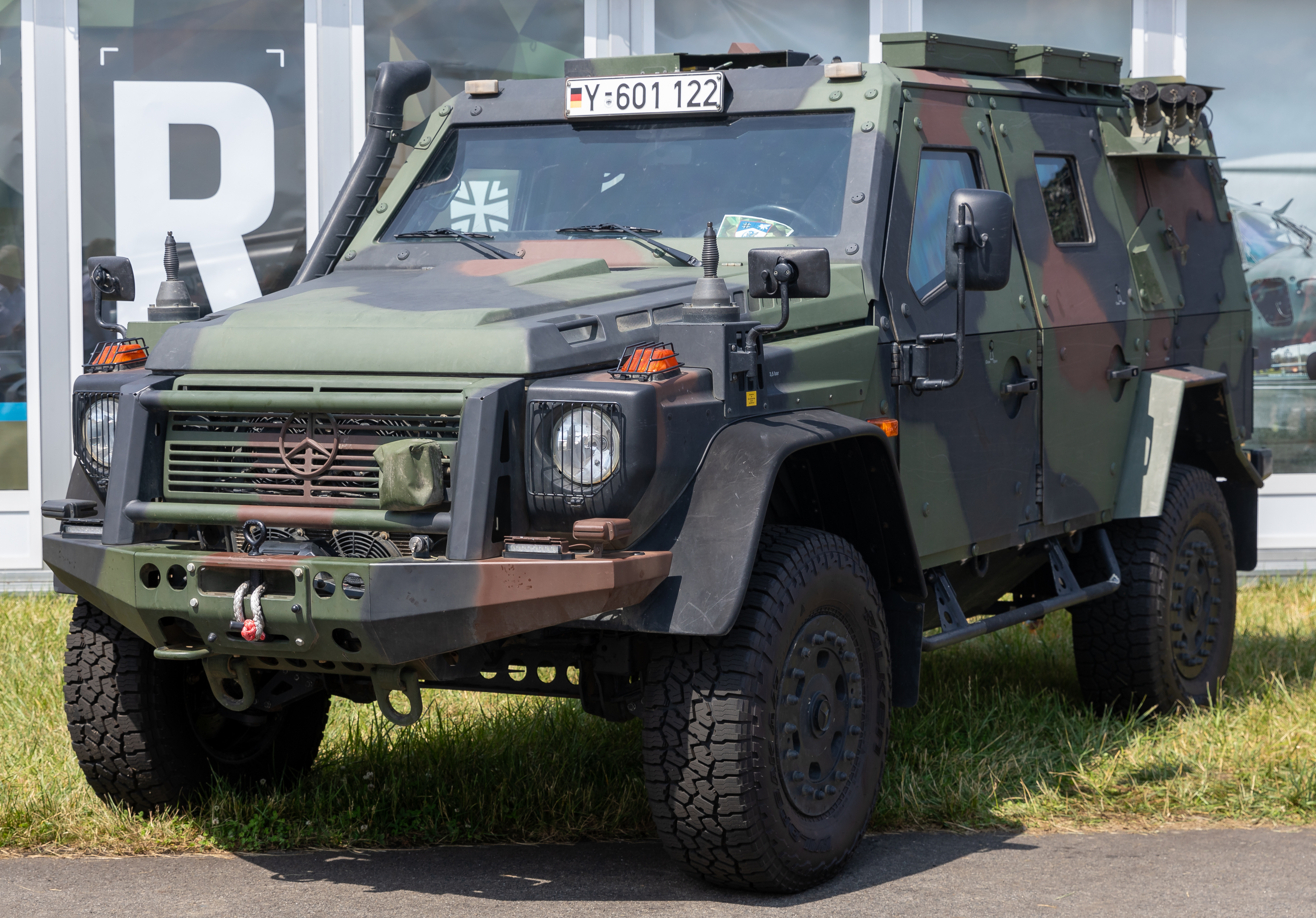
ENOK 6.1 Bundeswehr, KSK

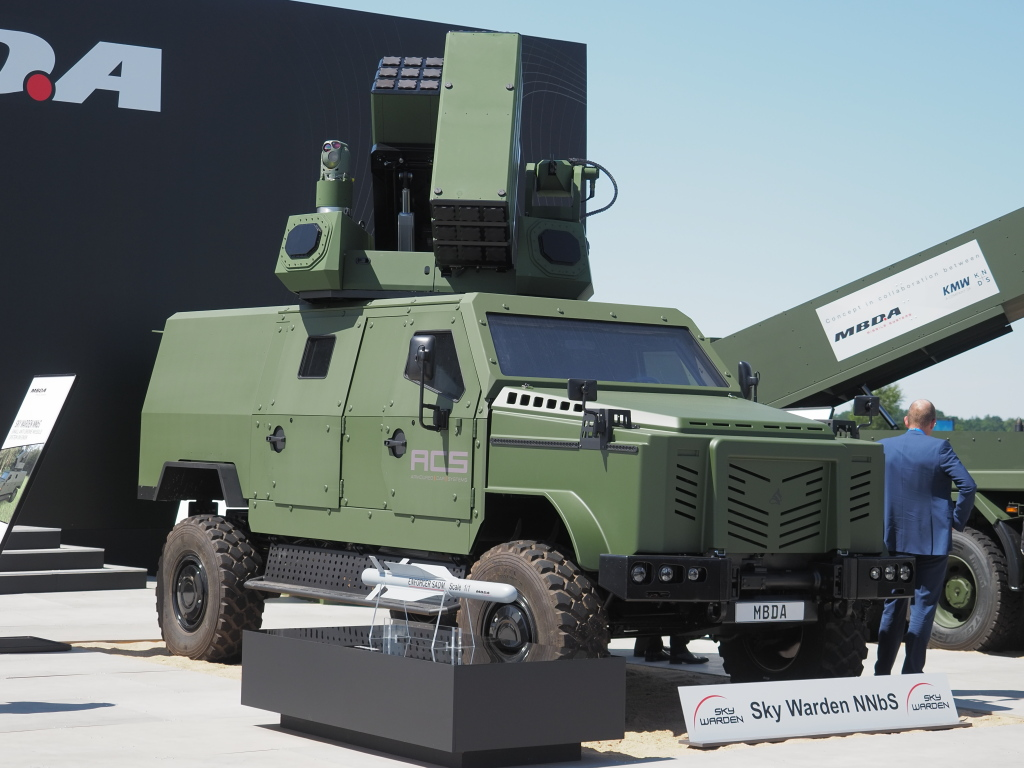
ENOK 14.8 Prototype, air defence

== Operators ==
=== Military operators ===
==== Current operators ====
Cyprus (60)
The Cypriot National Guard ordered 60 ENOK 4.8 AB, and received its first in August 2024, equipped with Spike LR2 missiles.
Czech Republic (5)
The 601st Special Forces Group operates 5 ENOK 4.8 AB vehicles.
Germany (221)
The Enok is known as the GFF1 ("Geschütztes Führungs- und Funktionsfahrzeug") in the German Army.
- 137 ENOK 5.4 ordered in 2008. The variants in service are:
  - 76 military police (Feldjäger)
  - 45 patrol vehicles
  - 10 EOD
  - 5 dog guide vehicle
- 84 ENOK 6.1 ordered in 2015, worth €56.3 million:
  - 53 of which are for the special forces (KSK)
  - 23 used by the Joint Service Support
  - 8 used by the Air Force
Montenegro (6)
Germany donated 6 ENOK 5.4 to the Armed Forces of Montenegro in 2018 as military support, donation worth €2.2 million.
Switzerland (> 4)
The Swiss Army operates two variants of the ENOK 5.4, but the volume in service is unknown.
- ACS Enok 5.4 Swissint, used as armoured vehicle for patrolling in peace keeping missions.
- 4 ACS Enok 5.4 Radiometrie Wagen L22, used by NBC reconnaissance troops.

==== Future operators ====
Czech Republic (5)
Additional ENOK 4.8 AB for the 601st Special Forces Group ordered in May 2025, unknown quantity.
Denmark
Ordered by the Danish Army in 2025.
Romania
The Romanian special forces will operate the ENOK AB, the airborne variant.

=== Police operators ===
Austria
ENOK 6.2 operated by the police.
Finland (15)
The Finnish Police ordered 15 ENOK 5.4 to be delivered between 2018 and 2019.
Germany (31)
German Federal Police (Bundespolizei) (28)

- 7 ENOK 6.1 since mid-2018, vehicles used for airport security, known as GEF-2 LuSi.
- 21 ENOK 6.2 since 2021, vehicles used for BFE+, which stands for "evidence preservation and arrest unit", and is used for counter-terrorism and serious crime intervention.

Bavaria (2)

The Spezialeinsatzkommando of the Bavarian State Police: has been operating 2 ENOK 6.2 since 2020 (olive colour).

Lower Saxony (1)

The state police of Lower Saxony has been operating 1 ENOK 6.2 since 2021 for anti-terrorism missions (grey colour).

== See also ==
- Puch G / Mercedes-Benz G-Class, for info on the Wolf vehicle and the Austrian Puch G.
