= Cadex Defence =

Canadian firearms manufacturer

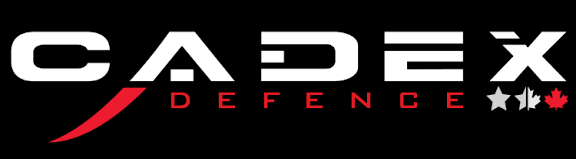
- Company type: Private
- Industry: Arms industry
- Founded: 1994
- Headquarters: Saint-Jean-sur-Richelieu, Quebec
- Key people: Serge Dextraze (President CEO)
- Products: Firearms, weapons
- Revenue: 25 millions $ (2024)
- Parent: Cadex Inc.
- Website: cadexdefence.com

Cadex Defence is a Canadian firearms manufacturer based in Saint-Jean-sur-Richelieu, Quebec. It produces high-end bolt action rifles, precision sniper rifles, rifle chassis and defence accessories.

== History ==
The company was founded in 1994 as Cadex. Initially, it specialised in helmet and eyewear testing equipment. In 2000, after it secured a number of orders from military units and police departments, it created the defence division.

Cadex Defence worked with Remington Arms to create the Remington RACS chassis for the M2010 Enhanced Sniper Rifle, a modern revision of Remington Model 700 rifle. The company offers a similar chassis to Remington RACS under the name Cadex Dual Strike.

On May 8, 2019, a 2 million CAD contract was awarded to Cadex Inc. to deliver 300 monocular night-vision devices for the Canadian Army Reserves.

On October 29, 2025, it was reported that Cadex-made sniper rifles were acquired by Russia, bypassing sanctions amid the Russo-Ukrainian war. Canadian Security Intelligence Service officers visited the company in May 2026. Cadex subsequently released a statement explaining an internal investigation was launched after the initial report, while stressing its support for Ukraine and that "at no time has the company sold, exported, or authorized the transfer of its products" to Russia.

== Products ==
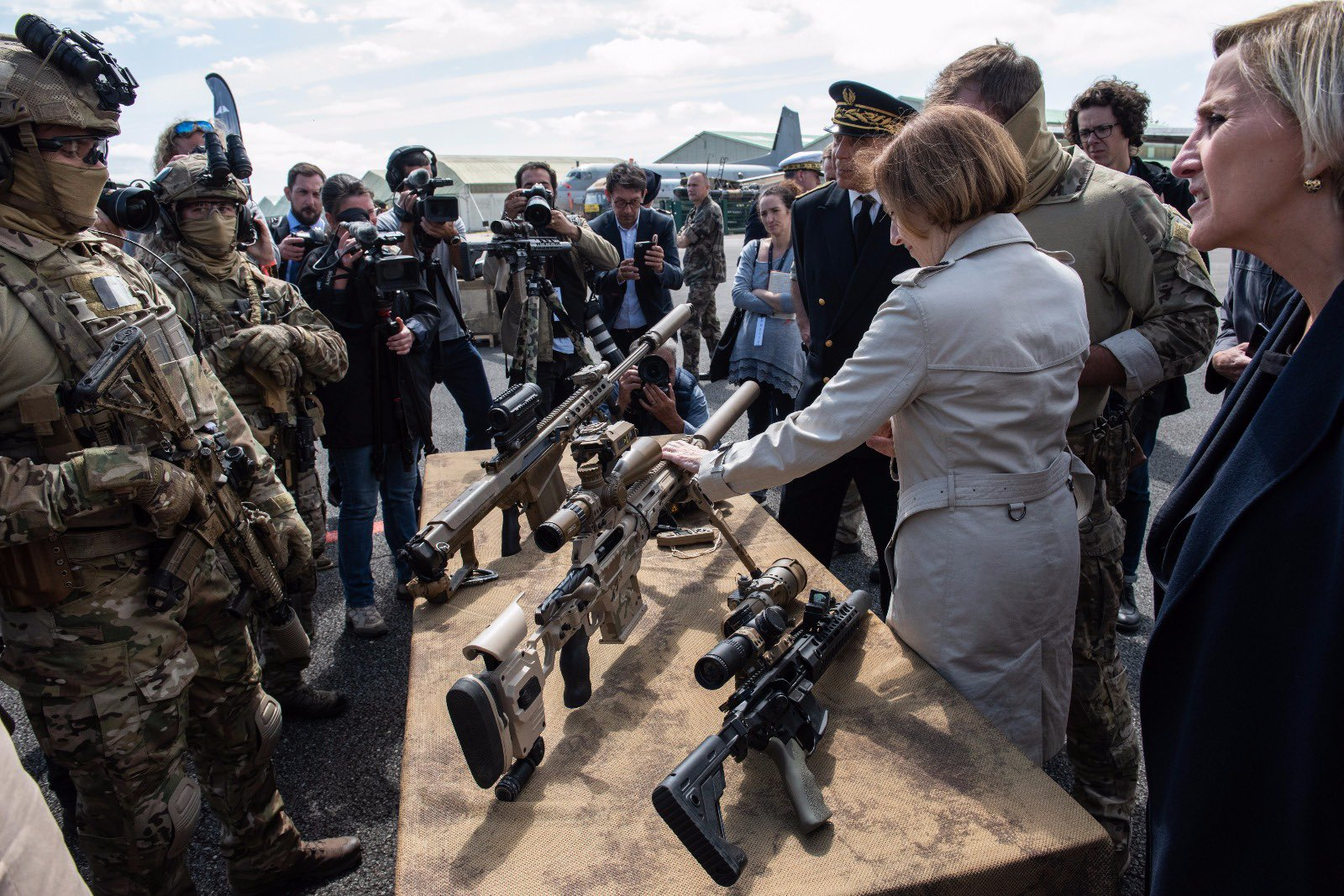
French Minister of Armed Forces Florence Parly examines a Cadex CDX-40 during a 2019 visit to the French Army Special Forces Command's units in Pau

Cadex Defence produces the CDX-MC Kraken multi-caliber rifle, which is based on Cadex Dual Strike chassis.

The company also produces CDX-40 Shadow rifles. Since 2019, these rifles are used by long-range snipers of the French special forces unit 1st RPIMA. The rifles are chambered for .408 Chey Tac.

Cadex Defence rifles typically use barrels from the American company Bartlein Barrels. Apart from that, their gear is entirely Canadian-made.

== See also ==
- Accuracy International
