= Lobaev Sniper Rifle =

Lobaev sniper rifle
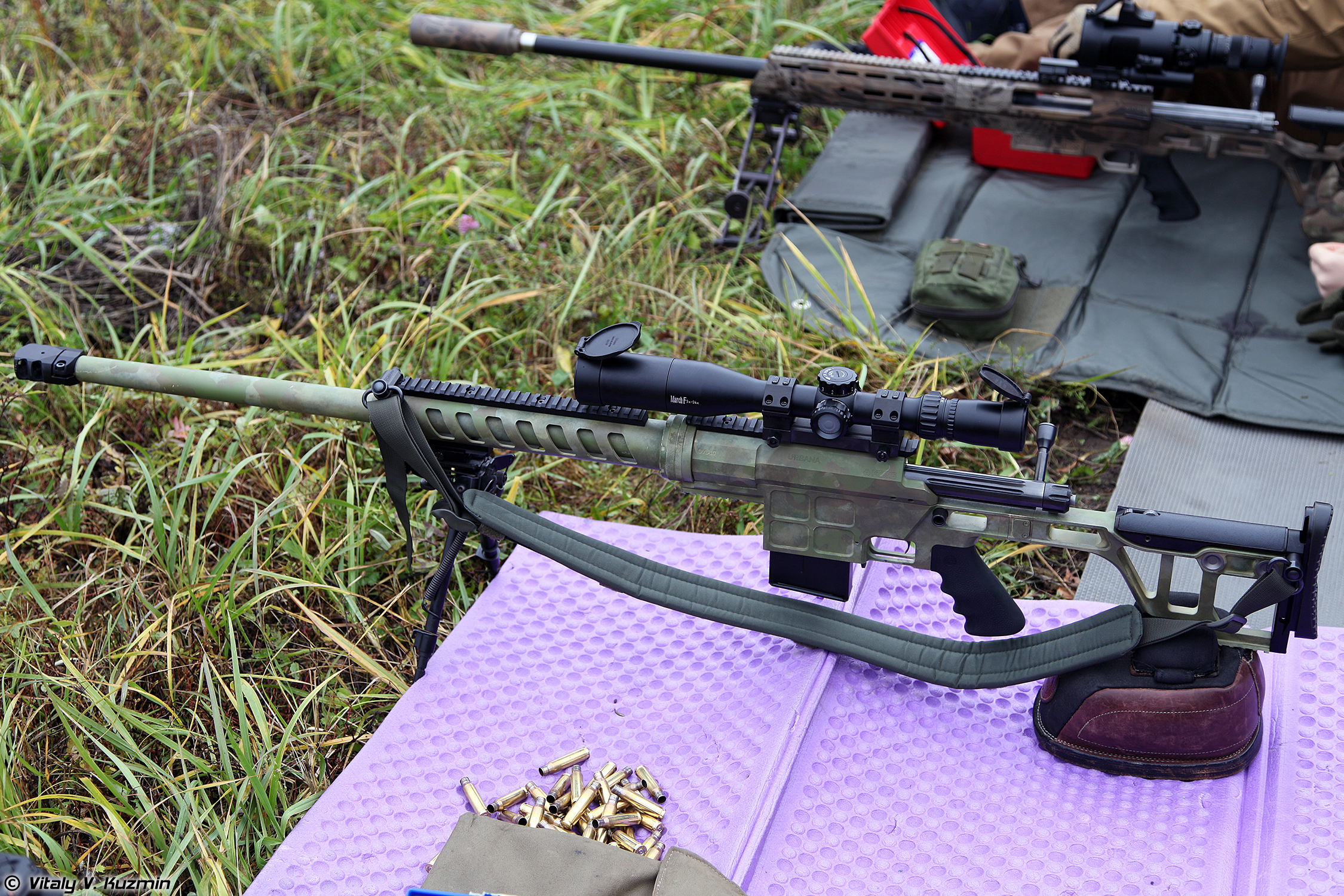
- DVL-10 during Interpolitex-2016 exhibition
- Type: Sniper rifle
- Place of origin: Russia

Service history
- Used by: See Users
- Wars: 2022 Russian invasion of Ukraine

Production history
- Designer: Vladislav Lobaev
- Designed: 2005
- Manufacturer: Tzar Pushka, KBIS; Tawazun Advanced Defense Systems (TADS)
- Produced: 2010
- Variants: SVL (Lobaev sniper rifle); OVL (Lobaev hunting rifle)

Specifications
- Mass: Varies on configuration
- Length: Varies on configuration
- Barrel length: Varies on configuration
- Cartridge: Varies on configuration
- Caliber: 408 LW .40 LW (Lobaev Whisper, 10+ x 48 mm), 338LW 8.6x39 mm, 375 CT, 408 Lapua, 408 CT, .338 Lapua Magnum, 408 LI, 6.5×47mm Lapua, others
- Action: Bolt action
- Effective firing range: 2,200 m (2,406 yd) (.408 Chey Tac chambering)
- Maximum firing range: 4,210 m (4,604 yd)
- Feed system: single shot 5-round detachable box magazine
- Sights: Picatinny rail provided for mounting a telescopic sight or other aiming optics

The Lobaev sniper rifle is a rifle line of custom-built bolt-action sniper rifles manufactured by Lobaev Arms, which produces benchrest equipment and long-range, sniper and mountain hunting rifles in Tarusa, Russia. The Lobaev rifles are based on a single-shot bolt-action designed for benchrest shooting by Vladislav Lobaev. The chambering, barrel, stock, ammunition feeding method and other rifle characteristics are determined by the clients' preferences.

== Variants ==
Lobaev rifles are offered in two main variants. The first variant is the SVL, СВЛ - Снайперская винтовка Лобаева (Lobaev sniper rifle). The SVL variant has a field quick barrel change feature and the top of the receiver features a Picatinny rail to mount aiming optics. Lobaev SVL sniper rifles are factory guaranteed to have 0.3 MOA accuracy with specific ammunition. With a typical accuracy potential of sub-0.2 MOA at ranges exceeding 2,000 meters, the Lobaev company claims it builds the most accurate long-range sniper rifle in the world.

The second variant is the OVL, ОВЛ - Охотничья винтовка Лобаева (Lobaev hunting rifle). The OVL variant is used among hunters and sportsmen like benchrest shooters, etc.

Other variants of the Lobaev Sniper Rifle include:

- SVLK-14S, SVLK-14M
- DXL, DXL-5 Havoc
- TSVL
- DVL

== Gallery ==
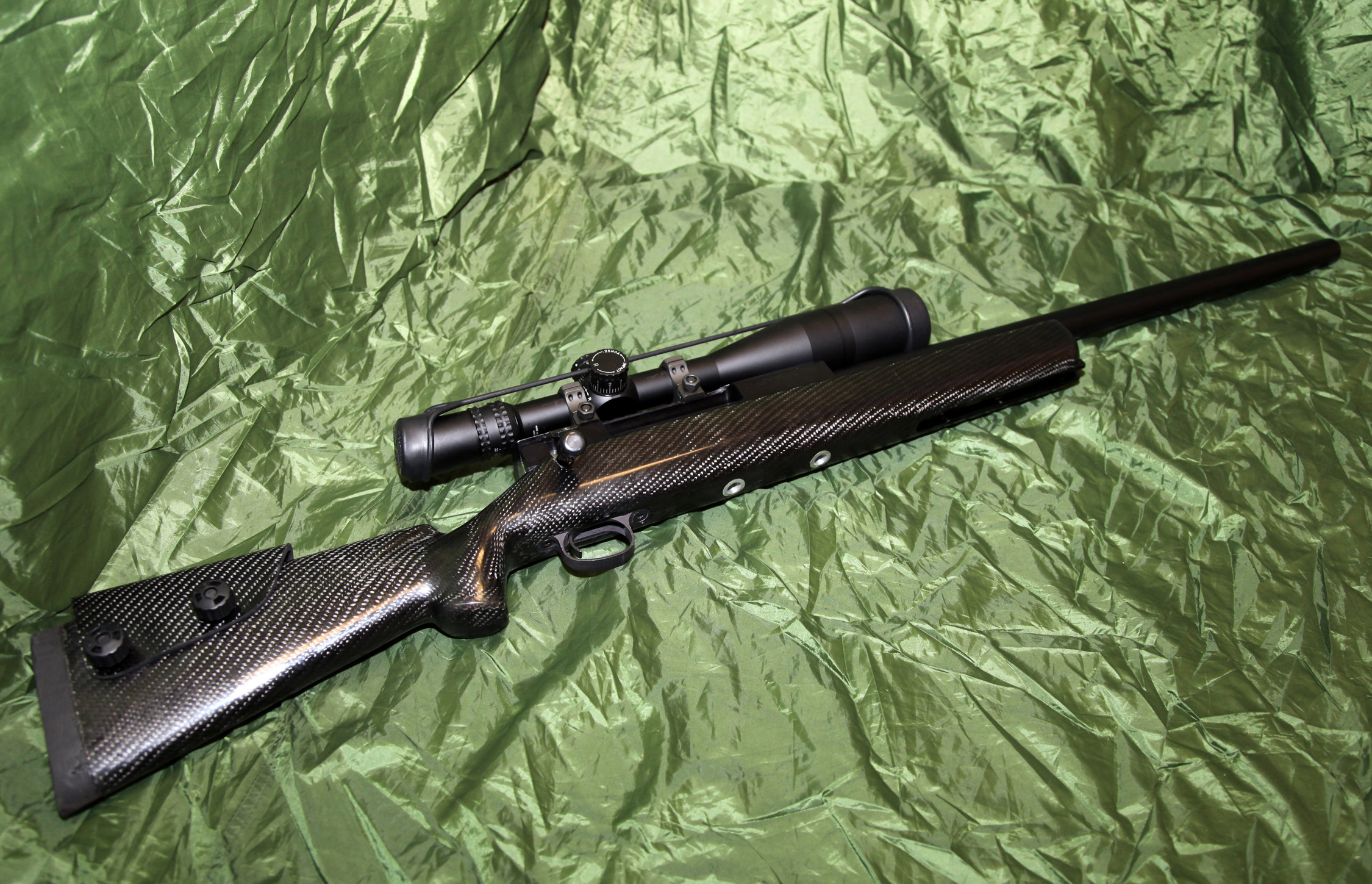
Lobaev OVL-3 rifle with NightForce 5.5-22x50 NXS telescopic sight

== Users ==
- Argentina
- Belarus: Actively purchased by the SOF, Border troops and SOBR.
- Kazakhstan
- Russia: The SVL variant chambered for .408 Chey Tac is used by the Federal Protective Service of Russia. The DXL-5 variant chambered for the Russian cartridge 12.7×108mm is used by the Russian Ground Forces.
- UAE

== See also ==
- List of Russian weaponry
- Sniper equipment
