= ORSIS T-5000 =

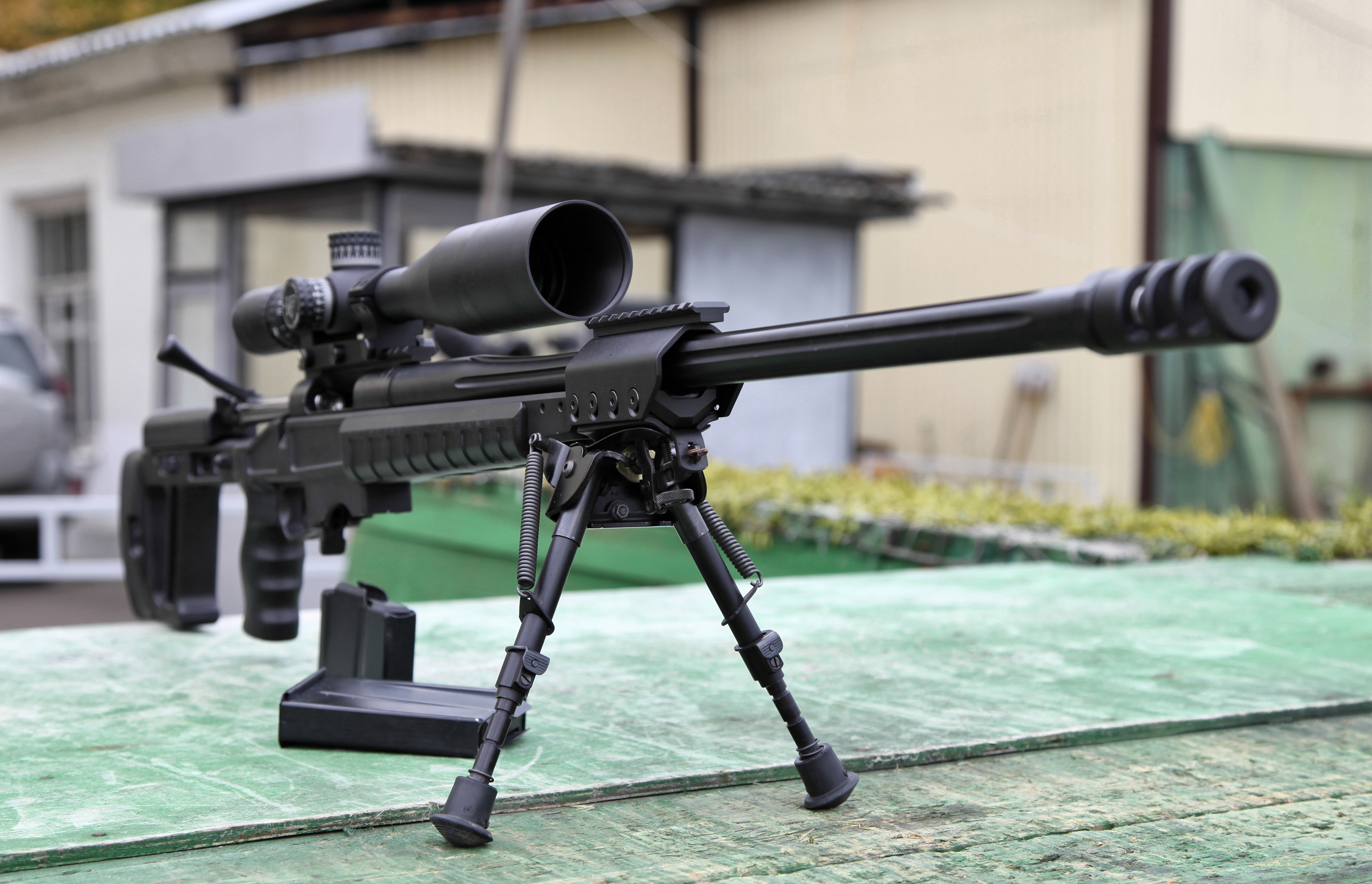
- ORSIS T-5000 in The Armourers Day
- Type: Sniper rifle Anti-materiel rifle (ORSIS 12.7)
- Place of origin: Russia

Service history
- In service: 2018–present
- Used by: See Users
- Wars: Syrian Civil War; War in Iraq (2013–2017); Russo-Ukrainian War; Russian invasion of Ukraine

Production history
- Designed: 2011
- Manufacturer: ORSIS
- Produced: 2011–present
- Variants: See Variants

Specifications
- Mass: 308: 6.3 kg (13.9 lb); 338: 6.5 kg (14.3 lb)
- Length: 308: 1,230 mm (48.4 in); 338: 1,270 mm (50.0 in)
- Barrel length: 308: 673.1 mm (26.5 in); 338: 698.5 mm (27.5 in)
- Cartridge: 6.5×47mm Lapua; 7.62×51mm NATO (.308 Winchester).300 Winchester Magnum.338 Lapua Magnum.375 CheyTac; 12.7 × 108 mm (ORSIS 12.7)
- Caliber: Various
- Action: Bolt-action
- Effective firing range: 308: 1,000 m (1,094 yd); 338: 1,500 m (1,640 yd)
- Maximum firing range: over 2,000 m (2,187 yd)
- Feed system: 5-round detachable box magazine
- Sights: Picatinny rail

The ORSIS T-5000 (Russian: ОРСИС Т-5000) is a Russian bolt-action sniper rifle. It was the first product developed by ORSIS, and is produced in their Moscow factory. The rifle was introduced in 2011 at the international exhibition of Russian weapons in Nizhny Tagil, and is entirely original, using no third-party components. According to General Director of the Institute for Precision Machine Engineering TsNIITochMash, Dmitry Semiozerov: "As of 2017, the newest sniper complex T-5000 "Precision" was adopted by the FSB, the FSO, and Rosgvardiya".

== Design ==
In its standard configuration the T-5000 is equipped with a 660 mm fluted, stainless steel barrel (698 mm when chambered in .338 Lapua Magnum), cut to a twist rate between 1-in-10 and 1-in-12 depending on customer requirements.

The stainless steel stock adopts a highly "skeletal" design, with highly adjustable butt and cheekpiece components mounted on a folding stock that reduces the transport length of the T-5000 by around 250 mm. The trigger is adjustable from 500 g in its Varmint configuration, to over 1500 g depending on application, and a Picatinny rail is provided for the attachment of optics.

== Variants ==
The Federal Security Service, the Federal Protective Service and the National Guard in 2017 adopted a next-gen ORSIS T-5000, and designated it as the Tochnost ("precision") sniper rifle chambered in 7.62×51mm NATO and .338 Lapua Magnum (8.6×70mm).

A next-gen T-5000 'Tochnost' sniper rifle chambered in .375 CheyTac (9.5×77mm) and made for rough military conditions was tested in the Moscow Region. Its range is over 2,000 m (2,187 yd). The tests were successfully completed in 2019.

There is also a variant of T-5000 chambered in 12.7 × 108 mm known as the ORSIS 12.7, intended for anti-materiel roles. This variant was first introduced during the ARMY-2022 exhibition held in Russia in August 2022.

The SBT-7,62M2 is a Vietnamese clone of the T-5000, which was revealed in 2024.

== Users ==
- Azerbaijan
- Armenia - Seen during the Second Nagorno-Karabakh war and after. Probably used in small numbers.
- Belarus – Ministry of Defense, Presidential Guard
- China – Used by Tianjin Municipal Public Security Bureau SWAT
- Cameroon - Used by Rapid Intervention Brigade and Presidential Guard.
- Egypt – Used By Unit 777 and Thunderbolt Forces.
- Iran - Used by IRGC Ground Forces and IRI Army Ground Forces.
- Iraq – Used by Iraqi Special Operations Forces and Popular Mobilisation Forces.
- Russia – In particular used by certain FSB, the FSO, and Rosgvardiya units.
- Vietnam

=== Non-State Actors ===
- Hezbollah

== Sources ==
- Сергей Самаров (24 October 2014). Пуля для ликвидатора. Эксмо. pp. 214–. ISBN 978-5-457-53546-6.
