= .400 Taylor Magnum =

Rifle cartridge

- Type: Rifle

Specifications
- Neck diameter: 9.52 mm (0.375 in)

The .400 Taylor Magnum is a rifle cartridge. It was derived from "a modified .505 Gibbs, necked down to 0.375 inches". The .408 Cheyenne Tactical and the .375 Cheyenne Tactical were later based on the .400 Taylor Magnum.
