= ORSIS =

Russian arms manufacturer

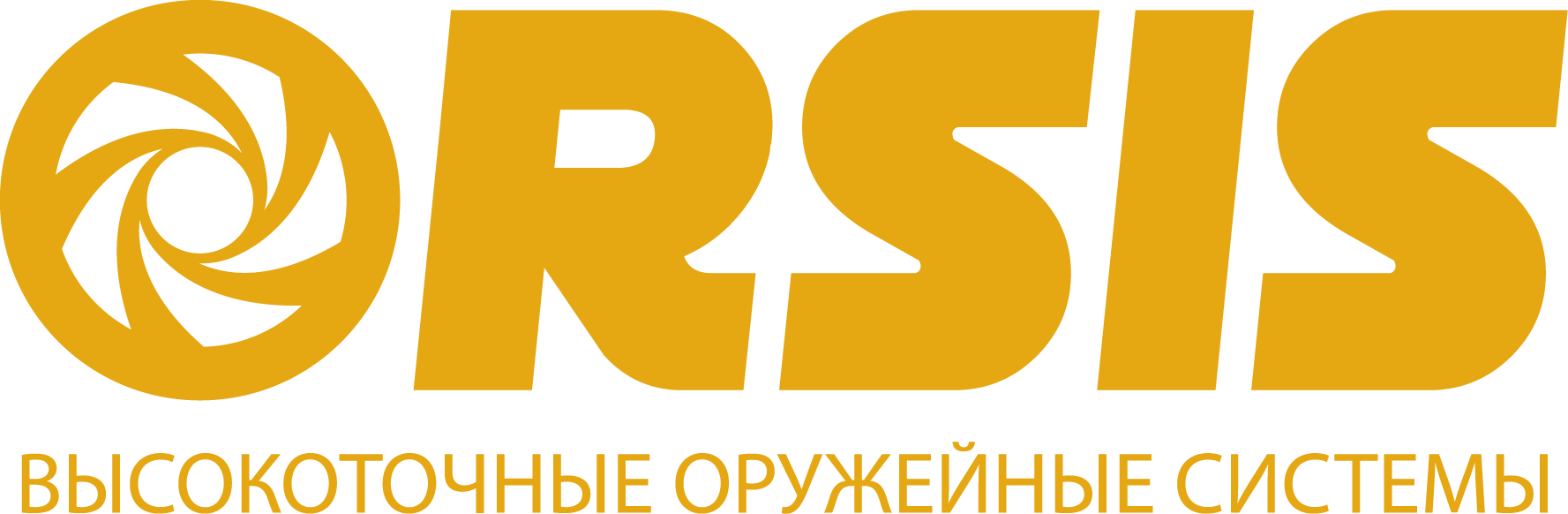
- Company type: Private
- Industry: Arms industry
- Founded: March 2011
- Headquarters: Moscow, Russia
- Products: Firearms
- Number of employees: >150
- Website: orsis.com

ORSIS (Russian: ОРСИС, from ОРужейные СИСтемы, "Weapon Systems") is the trading name of Promtechnology (Russian: Промтехнология) Group based in Moscow, Russia. Specialising in the manufacture of centrefire rifles designed for a variety of military and civilian applications, ORSIS was founded in 2011 and is currently privately owned.

The company launched with the T-5000 tactical rifle, before releasing a number of civilian derivatives for both hunting and long range target shooting. The company is able to produce entire rifles, including stocks, actions and barrels, as well as being able to produce replacement barrels for third party firearms. Its products are produced at the factory of the "Promtekhnologia" company located in Moscow.

Alongside their centre-fire product line, development of a rimfire rifle for IBU Biathlon competition took place between 2011 and 2013 with the resulting rifle demonstrated to coaches and athletes in December 2013. Rimfire hunting rifles are also planned as derivatives of this system.

== History ==
"Promtekhnologia" started its design of the ORSIS family of sport and hunting rifles in March 2011, and the ORSIS company was founded with its name from the abbreviation of the phrase "ОРужейные СИСтемы" (ORuzheynyye SIStemy), or "Weapon Systems".

The only ORSIS factory in Moscow is equipped with a modern machining park in which 40 machining centers for various purposes with programmable controls are located. This provides the possibility to maintain a high quality of products at every stage of production, as well as to provide flexibility and a sufficiently high performance of the enterprise.

The unique equipment of the enterprise allows production of parts with ideal internal geometries, and the equipment is no longer used anywhere else in Europe.

"Promtekhnologia" participates in joint ventures include with Glock, with ArmaLite and with Marocchi to produce their products in Moscow. ORSIS assembled copies of AR-10 and M-15 with stainless steel parts and of the AR-15.

=== Scandals ===
In 2019 the company was involved in bribery scandal about supplying the Armenian army with weaponry that led to launching a criminal case against the high-ranking representative of the Armenian Ministry of Defense by Armenian Investigative Committee in 2020.

In 2023, already being under sanctions, it was accused of avoiding it by purchasing long-range sniper rifle's ammo for the Russian army in disassembled form, however later that year company denied it to be done.

== Production ==
The ORSIS factory occupies an area less than 3000 sq. meters and employs around 150 workers. The company possesses all the necessary licenses and permits to manufacture firearms, as well as ISO 9001 certificates. "Promtekhnologia" is staffed with high-level engineers, designers, workers and management personnel. The enterprise also possesses all kinds of research and development systems in terms of design and modernization of firearms. It also realized cooperation with specialists from Russian science research institutes and those from high-level education establishments on metallurgical processing, material selection and designs of firearms. Their projects of creating high-tech weapons was realized with the support of the National Federation of Precision Weapons, whose experts have taken part in the development and testing of ORSIS products.

A complete cycle of production of ORSIS rifles is established at the company's factory, complete with production of receivers, bolt groups, triggers, lodges, as well as areas for assembly and testing of finished products. Every ORSIS model is an independent development by specialists of the company.

High-strength steel is used for the production of triggers and bolt groups of ORSIS rifles.

In 2012, ORSIS entered a joint venture to perform final assembly for a number of Glock products.

In October 2013, it was announced that American actor Steven Seagal would market for ORSIS, both marketing the firm's products as well as lobbying for the easing of US import restrictions on Russian sporting firearms. Seagal will also be designing and developing a new long range rifle with the firm preliminarily titled "ORSIS by Steven Seagal".

=== Barrels ===
ORSIS can offer barrels manufactured using one of two rifling processes.

- ORSIS barrels use 416 Stainless Steel and the Button method.
- ORSIS SE barrels use 4140 grade Chrome-Molybdenum Steel with the Single-Point Cut Rifling process.

=== Firearms ===
==== Assault Rifles ====
- Orsis AS-15
- Orsis M15
- Orsis AR-15J

==== Bolt-Action Rifles ====
===== Centrefire =====
- ORSIS T-5000
- ORSIS Hunter
- ORSIS Alpine
- ORSIS Varmint
- ORSIS Varmint M
- ORSIS F-Class
- ORSIS Benchrest
- ORSIS 120
- ORSIS 140

== See also ==
- Lobaev Arms, a similar Russian company
