= CheyTac Intervention =

Sniper rifle/anti-materiel rifle

CheyTac Intervention M200
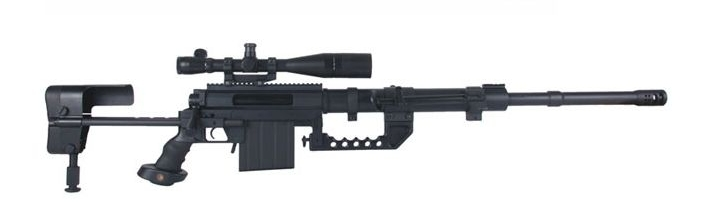
- A right-side view of the CheyTac M200 Intervention
- Type: Sniper rifle Anti-materiel rifle
- Place of origin: United States

Service history
- Used by: See Users

Production history
- Manufacturer: CheyTac USA LLC
- Unit cost: M200: $10,665–14,150; M300: (Carbon Fiber): $9,585–10,960; M300: (Composite): $9,135–11,000; All cost(s) exclude ammo, attachments, license fees, paint (including special colours & Kryptek camo), shipping, and tax.
- Produced: 2001–present
- Variants: See Variants

Specifications
- Mass: 31 lb (14.1 kg) without scope (M200)
- Length: 53 in (1,300 mm) (stock extended), 46.75 in (1,187 mm) (stock collapsed) (M200/M310)
- Barrel length: 29 in (740 mm) in standard, 26 in (660 mm) optional.
- Cartridge: .408 Cheyenne Tactical or .375 Cheyenne Tactical
- Action: Bolt action
- Muzzle velocity: 3,000 ft/s (914 m/s)
- Effective firing range: M200: 2,500 m (2,734 yd)+; M200 Carbine: 2,000 m (2,187 yd)+; M200 CIV (Civilian): 1,500 m (1,640 yd)+; M310 SS (Single Shot): 1,800 m (1,969 yd)+; M310 R (Repeater): 1,800 m (1,969 yd)+
- Feed system: 7-round detachable box magazine, 5-round detachable box magazine (optional, or when 7-round magazine is prohibited by law).
- Sights: none

The CheyTac Intervention, also known as the CheyTac M200, is an American bolt-action sniper rifle manufactured by CheyTac USA, which can also be classified as an anti-materiel rifle. It is fed by a seven-round detachable single-stack magazine (an optional five-round magazine is also available). It is specifically chambered in either .408 Chey Tac or .375 Chey Tac ammunition. CheyTac Inc. states that the system is capable of delivering sub-MOA accuracy at ranges of up to 2,500 yd (2,286 m). It is based on the EDM Arms Windrunner.

The CheyTac M200 Intervention has an overall length of 56 inches and can be shortened to 46.75 inches with the stock collapsed. Its weight is 31 lbs without an optic, and it has a 29-inch barrel. The rifle is designed for long-range precision, with an effective range of over 2,500 yards. It is a well-known weapon for its extreme precision, despite being available for civilian use.

== Design details ==
The CheyTac system consists of three major components:

1. .408/.375 CheyTac ammunition
2. CheyTac "XTreme Long Distance™" Rifle
3. CheyTac Advanced Ballistic Computer

The CheyTac M200 Intervention is a manually operated, rotating bolt sniper rifle. It features a Picatinny rail on the top of its receiver for mounting various optical sights.

=== Cartridge ===
The M200 Intervention is chambered in either the .408 CheyTac or .375 CheyTac cartridge. CheyTac specially developed the .408 CheyTac/.375 CheyTac cartridge for long-range use. The cartridge is optimized for accuracy by a balance of the rotational and linear drag, which reduces yaw and precession, and keeps the tip of the projectile pointed along the trajectory. The M200 Intervention is fed through a detachable 7 round box magazine, an optional 5 round box magazine is also available. Alternatively, cartridges can be loaded individually directly into the chamber.

=== Barrel ===
The M200 Intervention uses a free floating heavy-fluted barrel, which can be quickly removed for replacement or storage and transportation, and the shroud at the rear serves as a mount for an integral folding bipod and a carrying handle.

=== Attachable muzzle devices ===
The M200 Intervention features the McArthur PGRS-1 muzzle brake, which can be used to reduce recoil. The muzzle brake is also removable and can be replaced by an OPSINC suppressor.

=== Buttstock ===
The M200 Intervention has a collapsible and retractable buttstock that is adjustable for length of pull and for easy storage and transportation. The buttstock also contains an integral rear monopod, which is hinged, and can be folded up when not in use.

=== Day and low light optical sights ===
There are two different day optical sights available for the M200 Intervention. The standard optical sight is the Nightforce NXS 5.5-22x56 variable magnification telescopic sight with a 56 mm objective. The alternative optical sight is the US Optics SN-9. The night vision system is the AN/PVS-14 GEN III Pinnacle monocular, which attaches to the day optic using the Monoloc device. An AN/PEQ-2 infrared laser provides additional lighting in low-light conditions. The device is attached to a titanium strut.

=== Accessories ===
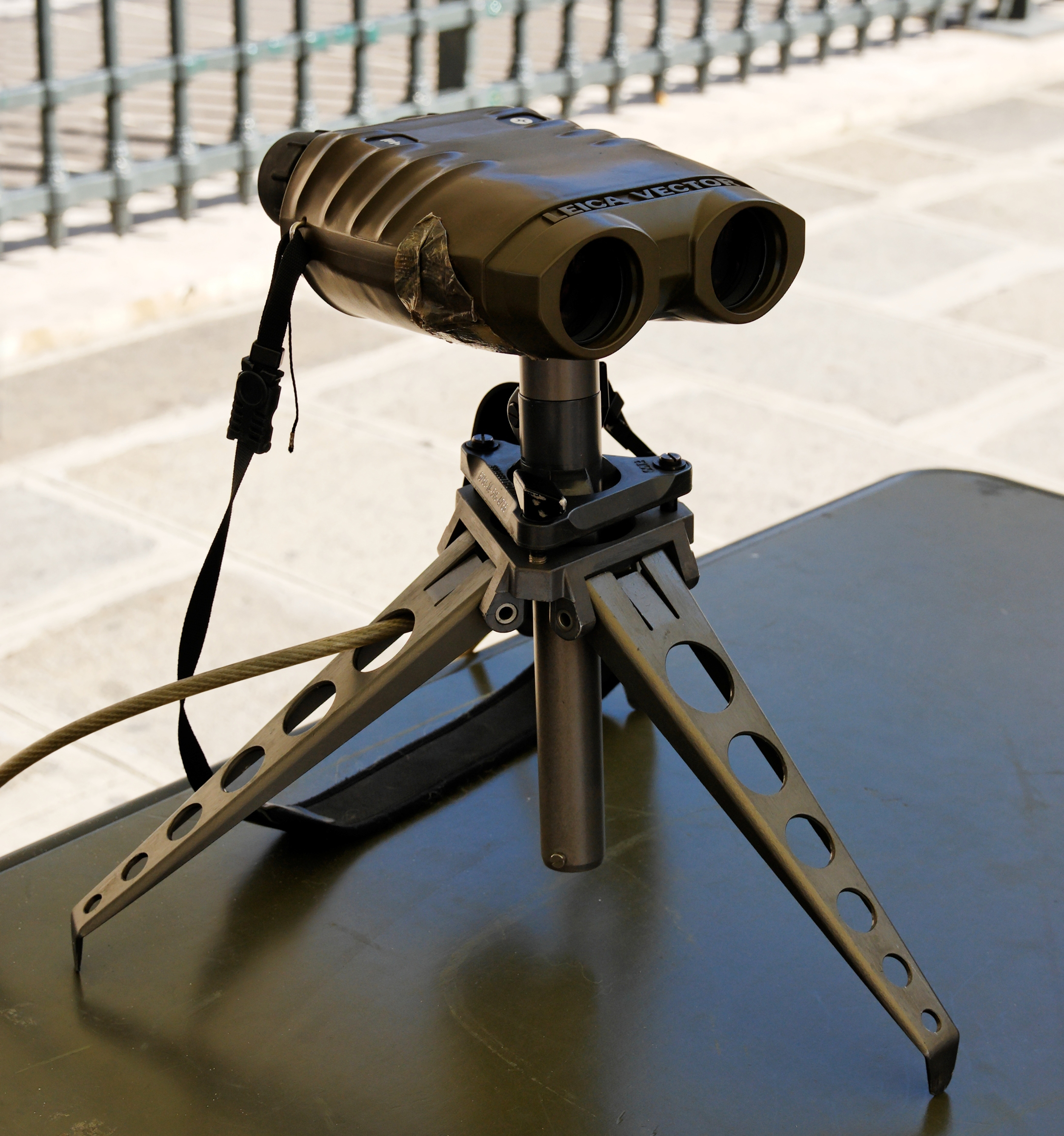
Vector laser range finder binoculars.

The M200 Intervention comes with a portable advanced ballistic computer, laser rangefinder binoculars and meteorological and environmental sensor package. All these components, together with the sniper rifle, are part of the CheyTac Long Range Sniper System (LRSS) and are linked to the ballistic computer. It provides all necessary data and calculations for accurate long range firing.

- Advanced Ballistic Computer – The CheyTac Advanced Ballistic Computer (ABC) System software package uses tabulated bullet flight data derived from high speed Doppler radar test sessions, and mathematical models to predict ballistic trajectory. It runs on Windows Mobile 2003 and receives input from the Kestrel handheld weather station and Vector IV laser rangefinder binoculars. However, much like other ballistic prediction software, when rounds are used for which no Doppler Radar-established bullet flight data is known, the ABC System relies solely on mathematical ballistic models. Printed data tables are available for manual use.
- Meteorological and environmental sensor package – The KESTREL 4000 (or, 4500 NV) meteorological and environmental sensor package measures the wind speed, air temperature, air pressure, relative humidity, wind chill, and dew point. The KESTREL 4500 NV model is compatible with night vision devices.
- Laser rangefinder – The Vector IV mil spec laser rangefinder measures distances up to 6,000 m (6,561.7 yd), and houses a digital compass and class 1 eye safe filters.

== Accuracy ==
CheyTac states that "the CheyTac LRRS is a solid anti-personnel system to 2,000 yd (1,829 m)." The primary intent of the .408 is as an extreme range anti-personnel system. Groups of 7 to 9 in (18 to 23 cm) at 1,000 yd (914 m), 10 in (25 cm) at 1,500 yd (1,372 m) and 15 in (38 cm) at 2,000 yd (1,829 m) have been consistently obtained.

Groups of 19 in (48 cm) at 2,100 yd (1,920 m) and 29 in (74 cm) at 2,400 yd (2,200 m) have also been obtained. All groups that are up to 3,000 yd (2,743 m) are less than 1 minute of angle for vertical dispersion.

== Variants ==
The CheyTac Intervention originally was manufactured in multiple variants:

- M200 (29 in (737 mm) barrel length)
- M200 Carbine
- M200 CIV (Civilian variant, no longer produced)

The main capability differences between the different variants are governed by barrel length which determines the obtainable muzzle velocity. Higher muzzle velocity extends the effective range of a rifle, everything else being equal. The M200 CIV version was a marginally de-rated Mil Spec M200 with a 500 yard shorter effective range, this version was soon discontinued, and the 29 inch fully accurized version is the only version available for sale.

== Users ==
- Czech Republic: Used by 601st Special Forces Group
- Poland: Used by GROM operatives.
- Turkey: Used by Maroon Berets operatives.

== See also ==
- Accuracy International AX50
