= .408 Cheyenne Tactical =

Cartridge for long-range sniper rifles

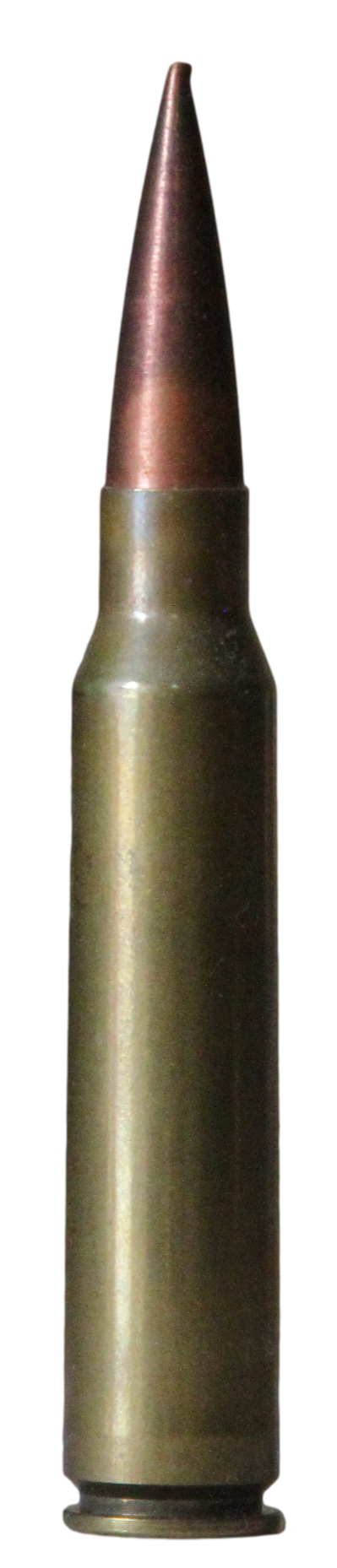
- .408 Cheyenne Tactical cartridge
- Type: Rifle
- Place of origin: United States

Production history
- Designer: John Taylor and William O. Wordman
- Designed: 2001
- Manufacturer: CheyTac USA LLC
- Produced: 2001–present
- Variants: .375 CheyTac

Specifications
- Parent case: .505 Gibbs/.400 Taylor Magnum
- Case type: Rimless, bottleneck
- Bullet diameter: 10.36 mm (0.408 in)
- Land diameter: 10.16 mm (0.400 in)
- Neck diameter: 11.12 mm (0.438 in)
- Shoulder diameter: 15.24 mm (0.600 in)
- Base diameter: 16.18 mm (0.637 in)
- Rim diameter: 16.25 mm (0.640 in)
- Rim thickness: 1.60 mm (0.063 in)
- Case length: 77.21 mm (3.040 in)
- Overall length: 115.50 mm (4.547 in)
- Case capacity: 10.32 cm^{3} (159.3 gr H_{2}O)
- Rifling twist: 330.2 mm (1 in 13 in)
- Primer type: Large rifle
- Maximum pressure (C.I.P. (2013–2021)): 440.00 MPa (63,817 psi)

Ballistic performance
| Bullet mass/type | Velocity | Energy |
|---|---|---|
| 305 gr (20 g) Solid | 3,500 ft/s (1,100 m/s) | 8,295 ft⋅lbf (11,247 J) |
| 419 gr (27 g) Solid | 2,752 ft/s (839 m/s) | 7,045 ft⋅lbf (9,552 J) |
- Source: Cartridges of the World

The .408 Cheyenne Tactical (designated 408 Chey Tac (10.36×77mm) by the C.I.P.) is a specialized rimless, bottlenecked, centerfire cartridge for military long-range sniper rifles that was developed by Dr. John D. Taylor and machinist William O. Wordman. The round was designed with a possible military need for a cartridge for anti-personnel, anti-sniper, and anti-materiel roles with a (supersonic) precision range of 2,200 yards (2,000 m). It is offered as a competitor to the most common military NATO long-range service cartridges, such as .338 Lapua Magnum and the .50 BMG.

== History ==
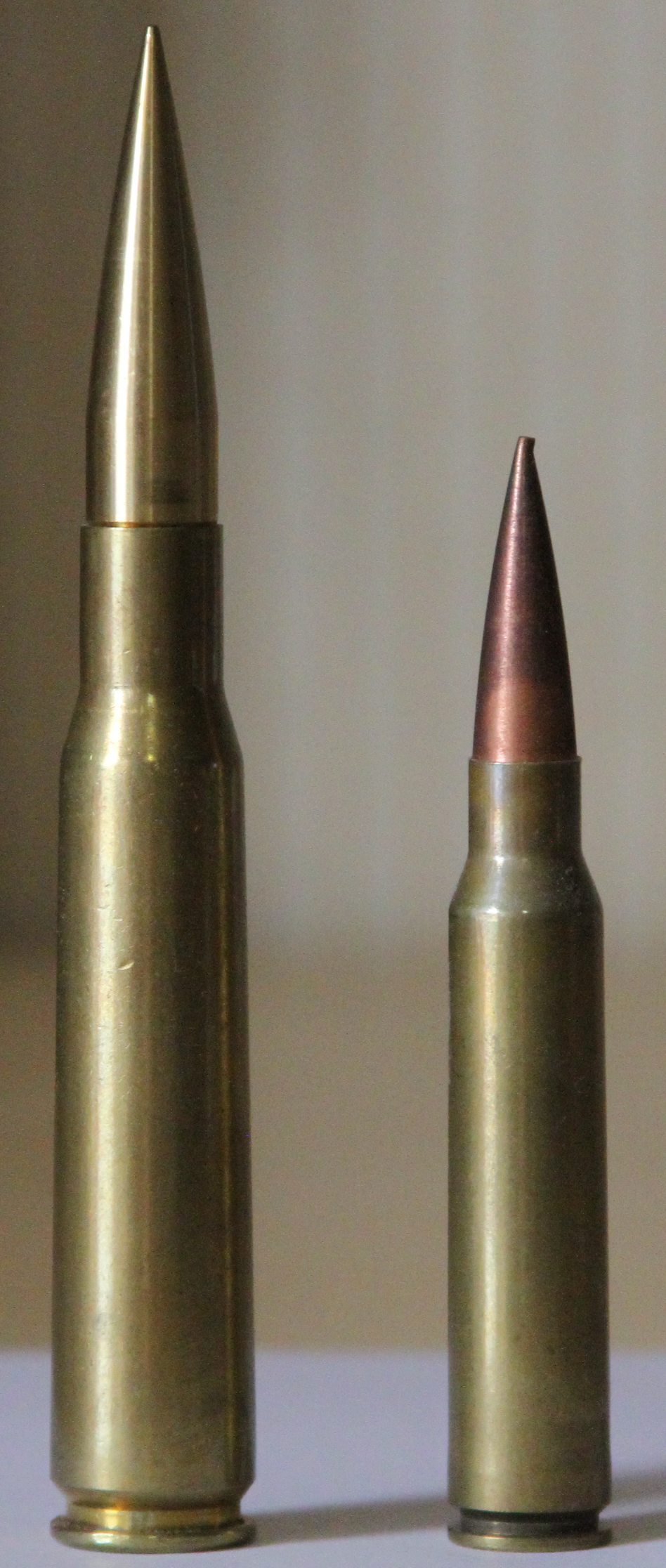
.50 BMG cartridge (left) next to a .408 Cheytac cartridge.

The .408 Cheyenne Tactical is based on the .400 Taylor Magnum, which itself is based on a modified .505 Gibbs, necked down to 0.408 inches (10.36 mm). The .505 Gibbs is an old English big-game cartridge that was designed to accommodate a pressure of 39,160 psi (270 MPa). One of the disadvantages to these old cartridge cases intended for firing cordite charges, instead of modern smokeless powder, is the thickness of the sidewall just forward of the web. During ignition, the cartridge's base, forward of the bolt face, is not supported. The case is driven back against the bolt face, which results in stretching of the case, particularly the sidewall immediately forward of the web. When the sidewall resists the outward expansion against the chamber, the pressure stretches the case, thereby increasing its length, resulting in the sidewall becoming thinner at that stretch point.

In the .408 CheyTac cartridge casing design particular attention was directed toward thickening and metallurgically strengthening the case's web and sidewall immediately forward of the web to accommodate high chamber pressures. In modern solid head cases, the hardness of the brass is the major factor that determines a case's pressure limit before undergoing plastic deformation. Lapua Ltd. solved this problem when they used the .416 Rigby as the parental case to the .338 Lapua Magnum. They created a hardness distribution ranging from the head and web (hard) to the mouth (soft) as well as a strengthened (thicker) case web and sidewall immediately forward of the web. This method results in a very pressure-resistant case.

== Cartridge dimensions ==
The .408 Cheyenne Tactical became officially registered by the Commission Internationale Permanente pour l'Epreuve des Armes à Feu Portatives (C.I.P.) on 15 May 2013 ending its status as a wildcat cartridge.

The .408 Cheyenne Tactical has 10.32 ml (159 grains H_{2}O) cartridge case capacity.

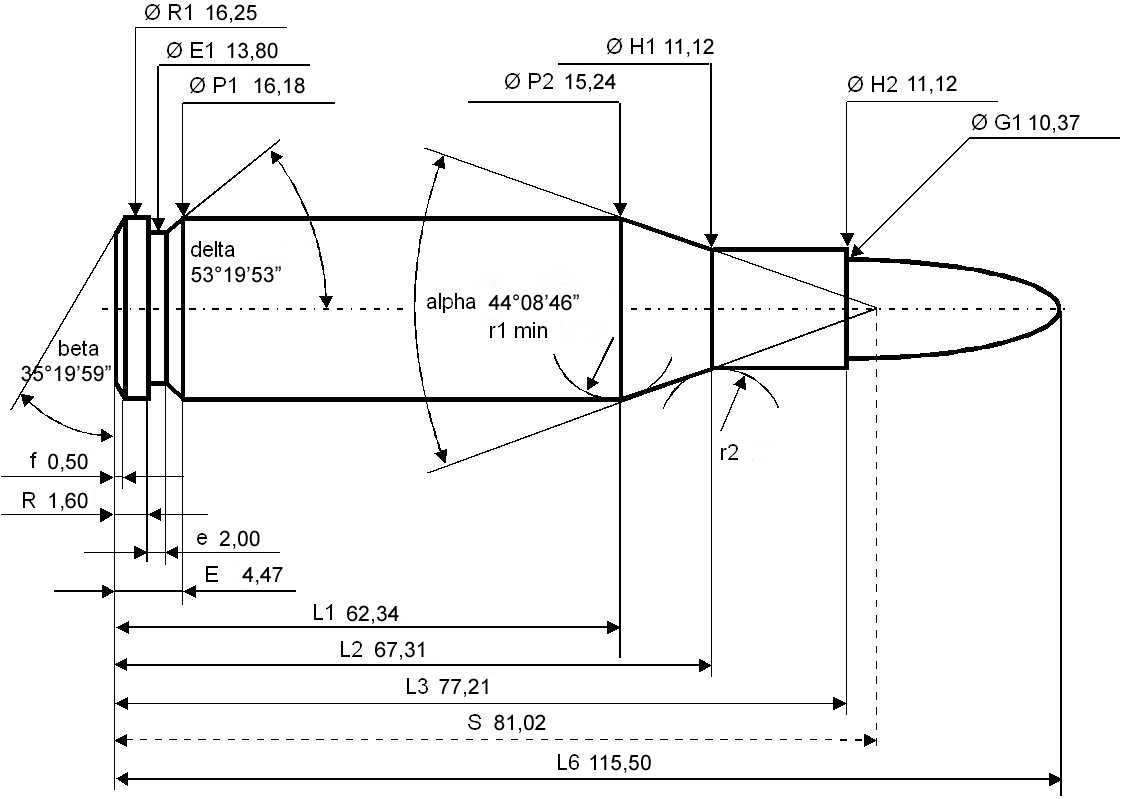

.408 Cheyenne Tactical maximum C.I.P. cartridge dimensions. All sizes in millimeters (mm).

Americans would define the shoulder angle at alpha/2 ≈ 22.13 degrees. The common rifling twist rate for this cartridge is 330.2 mm (1 in 13 in), 8 grooves, Ø lands = 10.16 mm (0.400 in), Ø grooves = 10.36 mm (0.408 in), land width = 2.57 mm (0.1 in) and the primer type is large rifle.

According to the official C.I.P. (Commission Internationale Permanente pour l'Epreuve des Armes à Feu Portatives) rulings the .408 Cheyenne Tactical can handle up to 440.00 MPa (63,817 psi) P_{max} piezo pressure. In C.I.P. regulated countries every rifle cartridge combo has to be proofed at 125% of this maximum C.I.P. pressure to certify for sale to consumers. This means that .408 Cheyenne Tactical chambered arms in C.I.P. regulated countries are currently (2016) proof tested at 550.00 MPa (79,771 psi) PE piezo pressure.

== .408 Cheyenne Tactical as a parent case ==
.375 Cheyenne Tactical
- Type: Sniper rifle
- Place of origin: United States

Production history
- Designed: 2009
- Manufacturer: CheyTac USA LLC
- Produced: 2009–present

Specifications
- Parent case: .408 CheyTac
- Case type: Rimless, bottleneck
- Bullet diameter: 9.53 mm (0.375 in)
- Land diameter: 9.30 mm (0.366 in)
- Neck diameter: 10.31 mm (0.406 in)
- Shoulder diameter: 15.22 mm (0.599 in)
- Base diameter: 16.18 mm (0.637 in)
- Rim diameter: 16.25 mm (0.640 in)
- Rim thickness: 1.60 mm (0.063 in)
- Case length: 76.91 mm (3.028 in)
- Overall length: 113.40 mm (4.465 in)
- Primer type: Large rifle
- Maximum pressure: 440.00 MPa (63,817 psi)

Ballistic performance
| Bullet mass/type | Velocity | Energy |
|---|---|---|
| 22.7 g (350 gr) Solid | 905 m/s (2,970 ft/s) | 9,294 J (6,855 ft⋅lbf) |
| 24.3 g (375 gr) Solid | 930 m/s (3,100 ft/s) | 10,499 J (7,744 ft⋅lbf) |

The .408 CheyTac serves as the parent for several other second-generation wildcat cartridges.

By blowing out .408 CheyTac factory cases the wildcatter generally hopes to gain extra muzzle velocity by increasing the case capacity of the factory parent cartridge case by a few percent. Practically there can be some muzzle velocity gained by this method, but the measured results between parent cartridges and their "improved" wildcat offspring is often marginal. An example of a blown out .408 CheyTac variant is the .408 Baer.

Besides changing the shape and internal volume of the parent cartridge case, wildcatters also can change the original caliber. Because the .408 CheyTac offers a large and sturdy, pressure resistant cartridge case, it has become quite popular among wildcatters. With the .408 CheyTac as the parent case, wildcatters have created .338 (.338 Little Dave (8.5×55mm). 338 Snipe-Tac. 338/408 Baer), .375 (.375 CheyTac, .375-.408 CheyTac, .375 Snipe-Tac, .375 SOE), .416 (.416 PGW), and .510 (.510 Snipe-Tac) caliber variants. As of 2007, the .375 in (9.5 mm) caliber variants seemed to attract the most attention. Due to this, CheyTac USA added .375 CheyTac to the factory chamberings for the Intervention.

=== .375 Cheyenne Tactical ===
The wildcat status of the .375 CheyTac ended on 17 May 2017 when it got Commission Internationale Permanente pour l'Epreuve des Armes à Feu Portatives (C.I.P.) certified and became an officially registered and sanctioned under the 375 Chey Tac or 9.5×77mm designation.

The cartridge has been used to set a long-distance target shooting record. In March 2023, Jaclyn Bryan shot a target at 4,227 yd (3,865 m) with the .375 CheyTac, taking the record for the second-longest-distance shot (current as of August 2023). She was assisted by Shane Bryan, who acted as a spotter, giving targeting-correction advice, based on his observation of bullet impact.

== Projectiles (bullets) ==
Most .408 CheyTac factory ammunition uses solid projectiles or bullets rather than jacketed lead-core bullets, which are common to most other rifle bullets. The oldest factory .408 CheyTac ammunition uses bullets designed by Warren S. Jensen and originally produced by Lost River Ballistic Technologies. Currently (2009) these projectiles are produced by Jamison International, where they are turned on Swiss-type CNC lathes from solid bars of proprietary copper nickel alloy. The factory claims their diameter is accurate to "one 50 millionth" but does not provide a unit of measurement with this claim, making it somewhat vague. One noted downside to the use of solid mono metal projectiles is that they tend to increase the fouling left in the rifle barrel after they are fired. Since the bullets are harder and more abrasive than the gilding metal jackets of normal jacketed bullets, they are made slightly "undersized" so that they may be gripped effectively by the lands of the barrel's rifling. This inevitably reduces the seal of the bullet in the barrel, allowing hot gunpowder gases to reach the sides of the projectile, vaporizing some of the material and depositing it in the bore.

Other manufacturers, such as Rocky Mountain Bullet Company/Vigilance Rifles, GS Custom Bullets, Lehigh Bullets & Design, Lutz Möller and TTI Armory have developed lead-core or mono metal very-low-drag projectiles for the .408 CheyTac.

In 2007 Dr. John D. Taylor designed a new class of armor-piercing projectiles known as the .408 CheyCorey and in this configuration, it outperforms the .50 AP (both black and silver tips) cartridge against armor steel and titanium. The projectile has a mass of 370 grains (24.0 g). Claimed penetration of AR500 certified steel is 1 inch (2.54 cm) at 100 yards (91.5 m) and 1/2 inch (1.27 cm) at 775 yards (708.8 m).

In 2008 factory loaded .408 CheyTac 420-grain (27.22 g) lead core bullets with 955 copper jackets became available. The very-low-drag bullets are made by Rocky Mountain Bullets in Philipsburg, Montana and have a rebated boattail and a claimed ballistic coefficient (G1 BC) of 0.874.

Factory .408 CheyTac ammunition is expensive, starting at around $7 per round with Jamison International 419-grain (27.15 g) very-low-drag projectiles.

=== Ballistic coefficient of the Jamison 419-grain (27.2 g) projectile ===
Cheyenne Tactical claimed a Doppler radar-measured G1 ballistic coefficient (BC) for the Lost River Ballistic Technologies/Jamison International 419-grain (27.15 g) bullet of roughly 0.934 and a stated BC for the 305-grain (19.76 g) bullet of 0.611, though these numbers have been disputed by a number of knowledgeable sources. Extreme Firearms claimed the G1 BC of the same .408 CheyTac projectile to average 0.945 to 2000 meters and it drops to the low 0.900s to 2800 meters. The .408 CheyTac projectile remains supersonic up to 2,300 yards (2,100 m) according to Extreme Firearms. CheyTac LLC claims that the 26.95 gram (419 gr) projectile has a supersonic range of 2,200+ yards (2,011+ m) at 'standard air conditions'. The average ballistic coefficient of the 419 grain (27.15 g) is 0.945 over 3,825 yards (3,500 m). Jamison International stated the G1 BC of this bullet on their website in 2009 at 0.940. Currently (2024) the average ballistic coefficient of the 419 grain (27.15 g) is stated by CheyTac USA at 0.949 over 3,500 yards (3,200 m).

The above variations can be explained by differences in the ambient air density used for these BC statements or differing range-speed measurements on which the stated G1 BC averages are based. The BC changes during a projectile's flight and stated BC's are always averages for particular range-speed regimes. Some more explanation about the transient nature of a projectile's G1 BC (it rises above or gets under a stated average value for a certain speed-range regime) during flight can be found at the external ballistics article. This article implies that knowing how a BC was established is almost as important as knowing the stated BC value itself. Fixed drag curve models generated for standard-shaped projectiles or BC modelling are the most common method used but not an advanced or desirable method to model the long range flight behavior of projectiles.

=== Balanced-flight/controlled-spin projectile ===
Lost River Ballistic Technologies (statement of Mr. Warren Jensen) stated that "the .408 CheyTac is the first bullet/rifle system that utilizes what they call a balanced flight projectile. To achieve balanced flight the linear drag has to be balanced with the rotational drag to keep the very fine nose (meplat) of the bullet pointed directly into the oncoming air. It should result in very little precession and yaw at extreme range and allows accurate flight back through the transonic region. This is hard to achieve for small arms projectiles. Mathematically you are at a great disadvantage trying to achieve balanced flight with a lead core non mono metal bullet. The rotational mass/surface area ratio is too high."

The balanced flight projectile patent can be found at the US Patent Office, Controlled spin projectile, US PAT No. 6,629,669. According to the patent a projectile engraved and launched in accordance with the patent should decelerate from supersonic flight through transonic to subsonic in a stable and predictable manner effective to a range beyond 3000 yards (2,743 m). It implies that among several other preconditions the rifle barrel has to have specific rifling dimensions to achieve a desired amount of axial air drag on the bullet's surface, which reduces the bullet's spin rate to achieve balanced flight. The patent does not account for normally occurring differences in air density. More about balanced flight can also be found in the CheyTac Information Papers.

The Balanced Flight/Controlled Spin Projectile bullet patent has been questioned/disputed by the German physicist Lutz Möller. Mr. Möller realized balanced flight has to do with the nature of spin stabilized flight and scale of parameters. There were projectiles produced prior to the patent that remain stable through the transonic flight regime. This is a consequence of the spin deceleration and forward deceleration of the projectile being similar enough not to cause undesirable precession and yaw during the transonic flight phase. The main parameter for achieving stable transonic transition is controlling the drag coefficients (C_{d}) and forward velocity loss around Mach 1 and to a lesser degree controlling the spin deceleration. In other words, any bullet with appropriate drag behaviour around Mach 1 and mass (distribution) will do exactly what the balanced flight projectile patent states.

== Performance ==
The cartridge delivers accurate (sub-MOA) performance from a sniper rifle. The Lost River Ballistic Technologies/Jamison International 419-grain (26.95 g) very-low-drag bullet is the standard, long-range sniping load.

Lost River Ballistic Technologies also designed a 305 grain (19.76 g) bullet for the Battlefield Domination Round (BDR). The BDR is loaded with a 305 grain (19.76 g) bullet (claimed G1 BC = 0.612) and is intended for short and medium range application using the point-blank range aiming method.

=== Supersonic range ===
For a typical .408 CheyTac chambered gun, shooting 27.15 gram (419 gr) Lost River Ballistic Technologies bullets (claimed G1 BC = 0.940) at 884 m/s (2900 ft/s) muzzle velocity, the supersonic range would be 1,930 m (2,110 yd) under International Standard Atmosphere sea level conditions (air density ρ = 1.225 kg/m^{3}).

For a typical .375 CheyTac chambered gun, shooting 24.30 gram (375 gr) Lost River Ballistic Technologies bullets (claimed G1 BC = 1.02) at 930 m/s (3050 ft/s) muzzle velocity, the supersonic range would be 2,230 m (2,440 yd) under International Standard Atmosphere sea level conditions (air density ρ = 1.225 kg/m^{3}).

Improvement beyond this standard while still using standard .375 CheyTac brass is possible, but the bullets have to be very long and the normal cartridge overall length has to be exceeded. The common .375 CheyTac 292 mm (1:11.5 in) rifling twist rate also has to be tightened to stabilize very long projectiles. The use of such a .375 CheyTac based cartridge demands the use of a custom or customized rifle with an appropriately cut chamber and a fast-twist bore. An example of such a special .375 caliber extreme range bullet is the German CNC manufactured mono-metal 26.44 gram (408 gr) .375 Viking (G1 BC 1.537; this Ballistic coefficient (BC) is calculated by its designer, Mr. Lutz Möller, and not proven by Doppler radar measurements). This bullet has since exhibited dynamic stability problems and is no longer produced. The .375 Viking bullet had an overall length of 70 mm (2.756 in) and derived its anticipated low drag from a radical LD Haack or Sears-Haack profile in the bullet's nose area. Rifles chambered for this wildcat cartridge, with a cartridge overall length of 119 mm (4.685 in), were to have been equipped with custom made 762 mm (30 in) long 203 mm (1:8 in) twist rate barrels.

In theory, Mr. Möller calculated that a typical .375 CheyTac chambered gun, shooting his now defunct 26.44 gram (408 gr) .375 Viking bullets (claimed G1 BC = 1.537) at 870 m/s (2854 ft/s) muzzle velocity, would have a supersonic range of 3,090 m (3,380 yd) under International Standard Atmosphere sea level conditions (air density ρ = 1.225 kg/m^{3}). However, field testing of this projectile proved it to be completely unstable, and useless at any velocity, or range. This was established in February 2009 by Terry Holstine, an Oklahoma State Trooper, who is the only person to ever have fired the Viking. It would appear that Mr. Möller did not test this projectile prior to public release whereby the dynamic instability would have been discovered.

.408 CheyTac ballistic comparison with other long-range sniper cartridges
| Cartridge | Bullet mass gr (g) | Muzzle velocity ft/s (m/s) | Muzzle energy ft·lbf (J) |
|---|---|---|---|
| .338 Lapua Magnum | 250 (16.2) | 2,970 (905.2) | 4,893 (6,634.0) |
| .338 Lapua Magnum | 300 (19.44) | 2,717 (828.1) | 4,919 (6,669.2) |
| .375 Chey Tac | 315 (20.4) | 3,050 (929.6) | 6,505 (8,820.2) |
| .408 Chey Tac | 305 (19.8) | 3,500 (1,066.8) | 8,298 (11,250.5) |
| .408 Chey Tac | 419 (27.2) | 3,000 (914.4) | 8,376 (11,356.3) |
| .416 Barrett | 398 (25.8) | 3,150 (960.1) | 8,767 (11,887.0) |
| .50 BMG | 700 (45) | 2,978 (907.7) | 13,971 (18,942.1) |

== Chambering availability ==
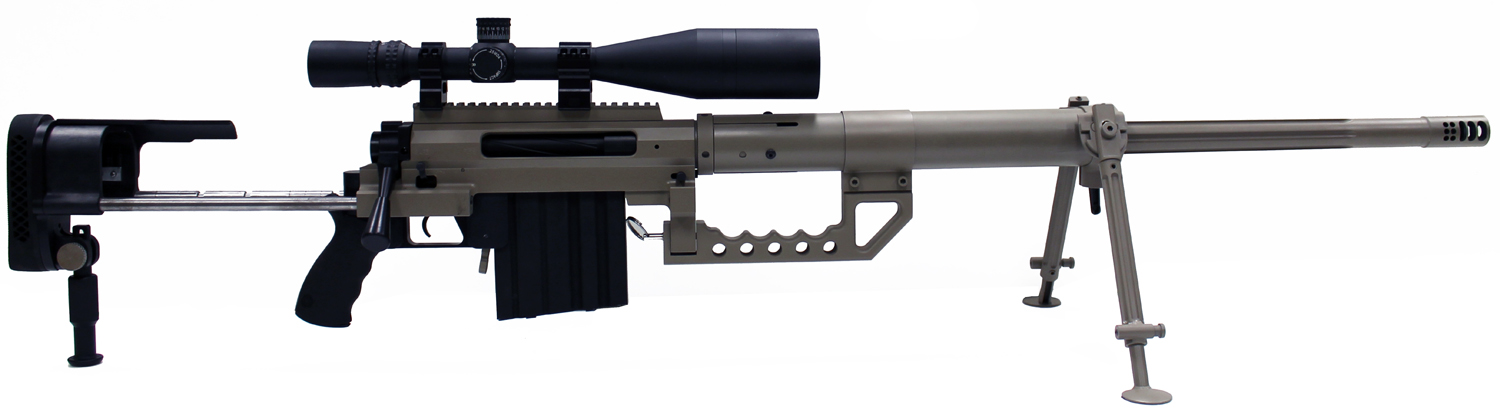
THOR M408 sniper rifle developed by Bill Ritchie of EDM and Thor GDG (who now owns the sole rights after the passing of Mr. Ritchie.)

The .408 Cheyenne Tactical chambering is offered for these factory rifles:

- Beretta - Victrix Armaments "Tormentum"
- BCM Europearms S.a.s.
- Cadex CDX-40 Shadow rifle
- CheyTac Intervention rifle series - CheyTac LLC.
- E.D.M. Arms XM04
- PGWDTI Timberwolf .408 CheyTac and .416 PGW rifle - Prairie Gun Works Defence Technologies Inc.
- Lawton Machine LLC. (Lawton Rifle Barrels)
- Lobaev Sniper Rifle
- Mirage ULR (Ultra Long Range)
- G.A.C precision rifles
- RND Manufacturing, Inc.
- Tactilite T1 (single-shot) AR-15 .408 Chey Tac upper
- THOR XM408
- Vigilance Rifles VR1
- Desert Tech HTI
- Cadex Defence CDX-40 Shadow
- Noreen Firearms BN408

The .375 Cheyenne Tactical chambering is offered for these factory rifles:

- Sako TRG-62 A1
- ORSIS T-5000

Several high quality large tactical and match (semi) custom bolt actions were designed for the .408 Cheyenne Tactical cartridge and were becoming available as of 2007. These semi-custom bolt actions are used with other high grade rifle and sighting components to build custom sporting and target rifles. Such rifles are ordered by long-range accuracy oriented shooters and built by specialized, highly skilled gunsmiths and can cost thousands of dollars. When built to expectation such rifles are very accurate—0.5 MOA or better consistent accuracy for a particular rifle optimized ammunition is considered normal.

== See also ==
- .505 Gibbs
- CheyTac Intervention
- 10 mm caliber
- .338 Lapua Magnum
- .416 Barrett
- List of sniper rifles
- List of individual weapons of the U.S. Armed Forces
- Table of handgun and rifle cartridges
