= 601st Special Forces Group =

- Czech: 601. skupina speciálních sil generála Moravce
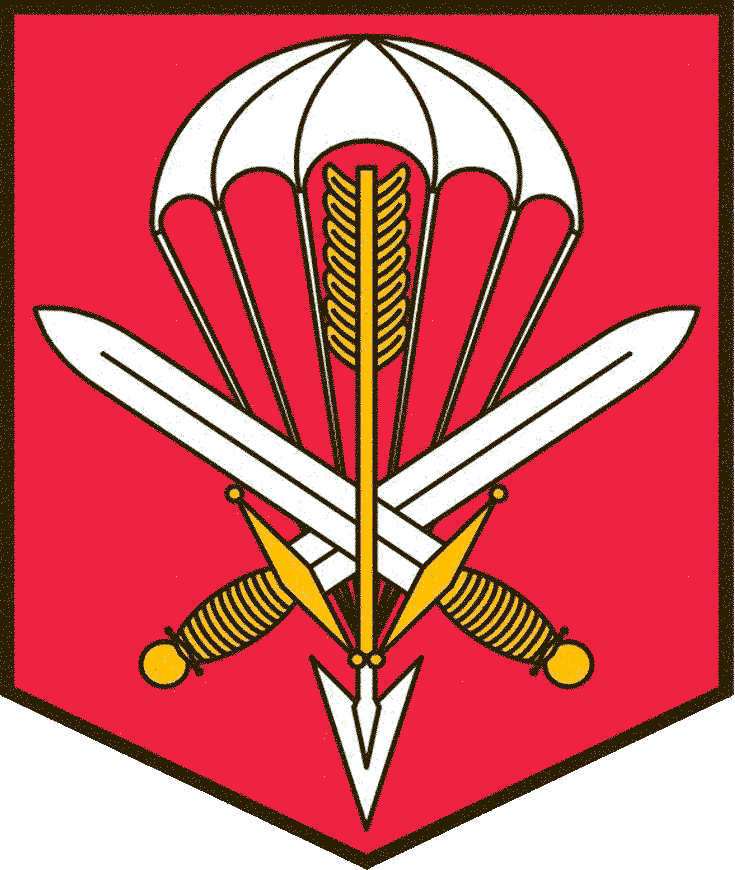
- Allegiance: Czech Republic
- Branch: Czech Special Forces
- Type: Special forces
- Size: Classified
- Garrison/HQ: Prostějov
- Patron: Brig. Gen. František Moravec
- Motto: Latin: Dum spiro spero

The General Moravec's 601st Special Forces Group or 601 SFG (Czech: 601. skupina speciálních sil generála Moravce or 601. SkSS) is a special forces unit of the Czech Armed Forces. It was officially created in 2003, the product of reorganizations in the Military of the Czech Republic in that year. However, it has roots that go back as far as 1952 when it was a paratrooper brigade.

== History ==
The 601 SFG finds its roots in a paratrooper brigade created in 1952. This unit was based in Prešov, Slovakia, but in 1960 it was relocated to Prostějov and the unit joined the 22nd Paratrooper Brigade, which was based in Prostějov. Until 1969 the members of the units were trained according to Soviet military doctrine, training mass parachute operations, defending points of military interest until the arrival of main ground forces. From 1970 to 1988, the unit began to focus on the training of small reconnaissance groups, which were to be inserted to the rear of an enemy to carry out diversionary and reconnaissance missions.

=== Military operations and deployments ===
Members of the 601st Special Forces Group participate or participated in many military operations:

- Saudi Arabia (1990)
- former Yugoslavia
  - UNPROFOR (1992—1995)
  - IFOR (1996)
  - SFOR (from 1996—2001)
  - SFOR (2004)
  - KFOR (from 1999—2006)
- Albania — AFOR (1999)
- Afghanistan
  - ISAF (2002)
  - Operation Enduring Freedom (2004)
- Iraq
  - Gulf War 1991
  - Operation Enduring Freedom (2003)
  - MNF (I) (2004)
- Kuwait — EF (2002, 2003)

6th Special Forces Company was the first Czech military unit which operated in Kosovo in 1999. It laid foundations for activities of other Czech military units in this territory.

So far, the most important operation the 601 SFG has taken part in was Operation Enduring Freedom in Afghanistan in 2004. This was the first combat operation of the Czech Armed Forces since World War II. More than 100 people participated for six months and, without break, fulfilled their tasks in arduous climatic conditions. Participation in this operation was highly praised by the highest state officials as well as the Army of the Czech Republic and International Security Assistance Force coalition partners.

In 1999, this group received the honorary historical name of General Moravec after the leader of Czechoslovak intelligence before and during World War Two.
