= Tennessee House of Representatives 49th district =

State legislative district in Tennessee

Tennessee's 49th State House of Representatives district
- Map of Tennessee House districts with the 49th District shaded in red
Representative
Mike Sparks; R–Smyrna
- Demographics: 55.4% White; 16.8% Black; 17% Hispanic; 4.2% Asian; 0.7% Other; 5.6% Multiracial
- Population (2024): 76,813

The Tennessee House of Representatives 49th district is one of 99 legislative districts in the Tennessee House of Representatives. The district represents the west of Rutherford County. The district includes most of Smyrna, part of La Vergne, and outer suburbs of Murfreesboro. It has been represented by Mike Sparks since 2011. The district is considered slightly competitive. In 2024, Donald Trump won the district by 18.3%

== Demographics ==
The Tennessee Comptroller estimates the population as of 2024 at 76,813.

- 55.4% of the district is White
- 17% of the district is Hispanic
- 16.8% of the district is Black
- 4.2% of the district is Asian
- 0.7% of the district is some other race
- 5.6% of the district is Two or more races

Detailed demographic information is also available through Census Reporter.

== History ==
From the 88th Tennessee General Assembly, the districts were numbered, at this time, the district was made up of Giles and Lawrence counties. At the time of the 93rd GA the district was in Franklin County.From the 94th to 97th GAs, it was made up of parts of Rutherford, and Williamson counties. From the 98th General Assembly it has been a portion of Rutherford County. It was historically a swing district, but has become less competitive.

== List of representatives ==
Representative	Party	Years of service	General Assembly	Residence
Mike Sparks	Republican	2011–present	107th-114th	Murfreesboro
Kent Coleman	Democratic	2003–2010	103rd-106th	Murfreesboro
Donna Rowland	Republican	2001-2002	102nd	Murfreesboro
Mary Ann Eckles	Democratic	1995-1998	99th-100th	Nashville
Mike Liles	Republican	1991-1994	97th-98th	Murfreesboro
Fred R. Hobbs	Democratic	1985-1990	94th-96th	Eagleville
Ed Murray	Democratic	1983-1984	93rd	Winchester
C.E. DuPriest	Democratic	1973-1982	88th-92nd	Pulaski
