= Barrett M99 =

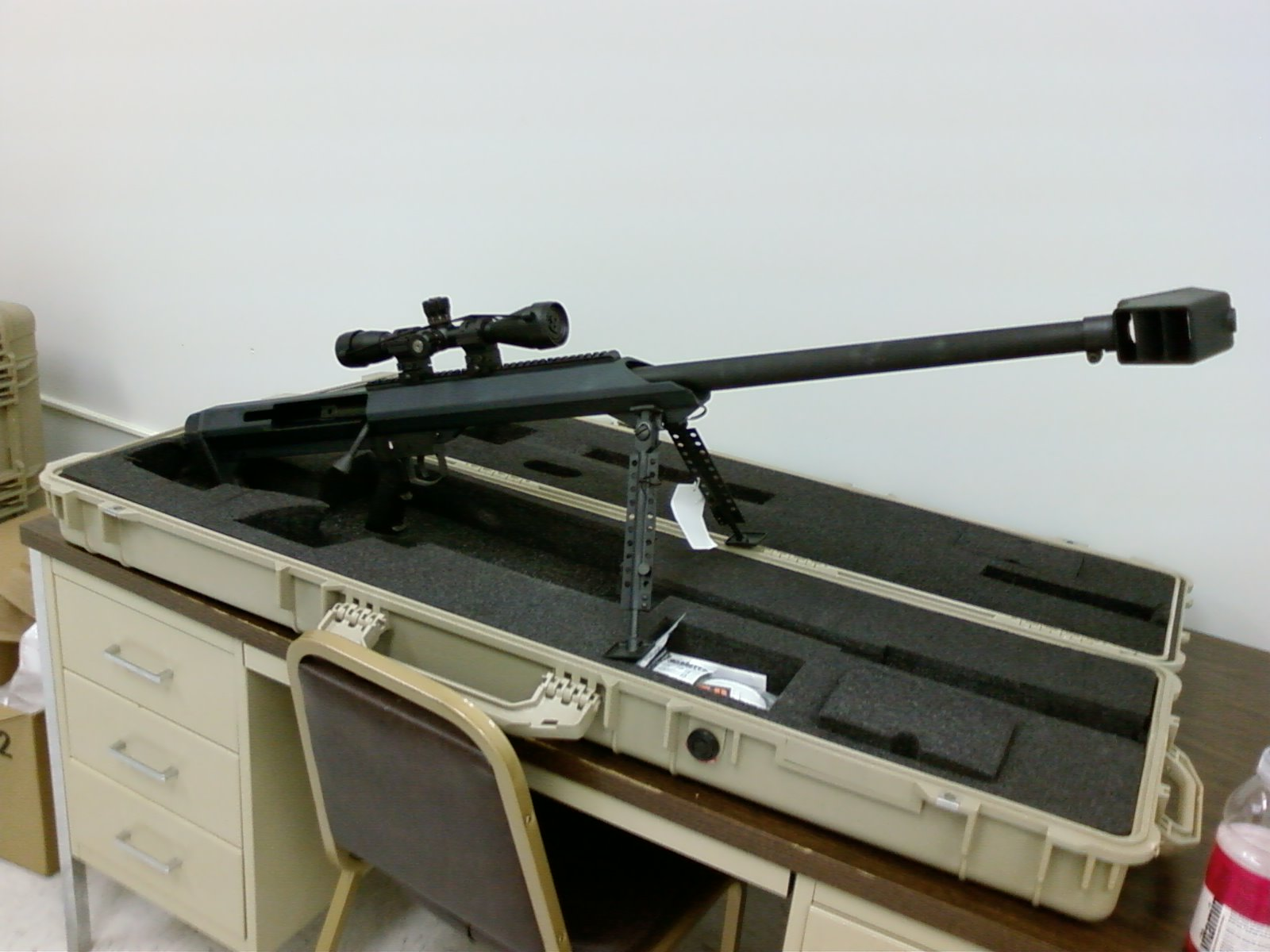
- Type: Anti-materiel rifle
- Place of origin: United States

Production history
- Designed: 1999
- Manufacturer: Barrett Firearms Company
- Produced: 1999–present

Specifications
- Mass: 23 lb (10 kg) (29 in (74 cm) Barrel); 25 lb (11 kg) (32 in (81 cm) Barrel)
- Length: 47 in (120 cm) (29 in (74 cm) Barrel); 50 in (130 cm) (32 in (81 cm) Barrel)
- Barrel length: 29 in (74 cm); 32 in (81 cm)
- Cartridge: .50 BMG (12.7×99mm).416 Barrett (10.4×83mm)
- Action: Bolt action
- Effective firing range: 1,800 metres (2,000 yd)
- Maximum firing range: 2,600 metres (2,800 yd)
- Feed system: Single-shot

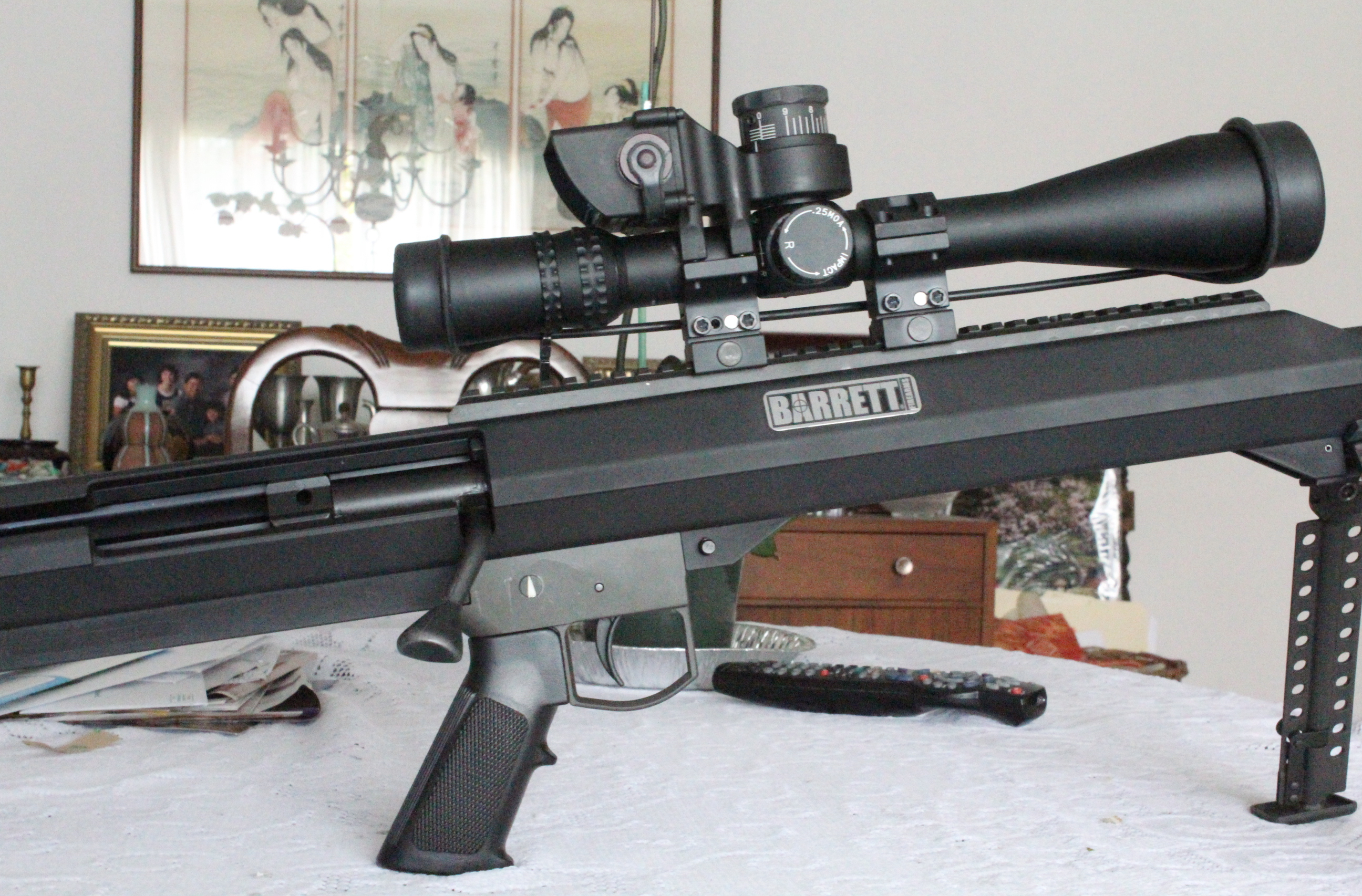
Side view of the M99

The Barrett M99 (Model 99) is a single-shot anti-materiel rifle that was first introduced in 1999 by the Barrett Firearms Company as a less expensive alternative to the company's higher-priced offerings. The rifle uses a bullpup configuration with a pistol grip. Its primary market was long-range competitive target shooters and in 2001, a shooter set a world record at 1,000 yd (910 m) with the M99 by shooting a 5-shot group which measured 4.09 in (10.4 cm).

== Design ==
The M99 features a hard-core construction, 7000 series aluminum alloy extrusion, match-quality trigger design, heat-treated steel M1913 rail, match grade barrel, and S-7 tool steel bolt. It has three quick assembly pins, allowing it to be assembled or disassembled without the use of tools. The M99 is very accurate because of its heavy contour barrel. With the .416 round, the accuracy and increased velocity compared to .50 BMG enables greater long range precision. The bolt is machined from a single piece of S-7 tool steel. To make the rifle very reliable and easy to maintain, the M99 has just three moving parts: the extractor, ejector and firing pin assembly. For bench rest shooting, the bipod can be detached easily. The design of the trigger is virtually maintenance-free. The barrel is locked into the extrusion by being hydraulically pressed, allowing the user to mount a rifle scope on it. The steel gun barrel and the aluminum extrusion surround the cartridge, making the firearm safer.

== Variants ==
The rifle is offered in two calibers: .416 Barrett and .50 BMG. The .416 Barrett version is available with a 32 in (81 cm) barrel and the .50 BMG version is available with a 29 in (74 cm) or 32 in (81 cm) barrel. Barrett also designs and makes a QDL suppressor for the M99. The 360 degree welding on the dual layered heat treated high strength alloys makes it the safest large bore suppressor on the market. The suppressor slides over the muzzle brake directly into the index point, allowing accurate alignment. The recoil of suppressed fire is reduced using an auxiliary two-port muzzle brake.

== See also ==
- Barrett M82A1
- Barrett M95
- Barrett REC7
- Barrett M98B
- Barrett MRAD
- Barrett M107A1
