= Tennessee House of Representatives 34th district =

State legislative district in Tennessee

Tennessee's 34th State House of Representatives district
- Map of Tennessee House districts with the 34th District shaded in red
Representative
| Tim Rudd; R–Murfreesboro |
- Demographics: 67.3% White; 13.5% Black; 8.7% Hispanic; 3.9% Asian; 0.2% Other; 6.4% Multiracial
- Population (2024): 78,579

The Tennessee House of Representatives 34th district is one of 99 legislative districts in the Tennessee House of Representatives. The district represents the south of Rutherford County. The district includes much of Murfreesboro, a portion of Eagleville, and many unincorporated communities south of Murfreesboro. These include Rockvale, Midland, Barfield, and Christiana. It has been represented by Tim Rudd since 2019. The district is considered marginally competitive. In 2024, Donald Trump won the district by 22.1%

== Demographics ==
The Tennessee Comptroller estimates the population as of 2024 at 78,579.

- 67.3% of the district is White
- 13.5% of the district is Black
- 8.7% of the district is Hispanic
- 3.9% of the district is Asian
- 0.2% of the district is some other race
- 6.4% of the district is Two or more races

Detailed demographic information is also available through Census Reporter.

== History ==
From the 88th Tennessee General Assembly, districts were numbered. At that time the district was made up of Anderson, Campbell, and Union counties. Prior, there was a district for only Anderson County. From the 97th-98th GAs, it was made up of Claiborne, Union, and Grainger counties. From the 99th to 102nd GAs, it was changed to Claiborne, Union, and part of Campbell counties. From the 103rd General Assembly it has been a portion of Rutherford County.

== List of representatives ==
| Representative | Party | Years of service | General Assembly | Residence |
|---|---|---|---|---|
| Tim Rudd | Republican | 2017–present | 110th-114th | Murfreesboro |
| Rick Womick | Republican | 2011–2016 | 107th-109th | Rockvale |
| Donna Rowland | Republican | 2001-2010 | 103rd-106th | Murfreesboro |
| Mark Goins | Republican | 1997-2000 | 100th-102nd | Lafollette |
| Micheal Williams | Republican | 1991-1996 | 97th-99th | Maynardville |
| Thomas C. Wheeler | Democratic | 1979-1990 | 91st-96th | Clinton |
| James E. "Buzz" Elkins | Republican | 1969-1978 | 86th-90th | Clinton |
