= LWRC REPR =

LWRC International semi-automatic 308 caliber rifle

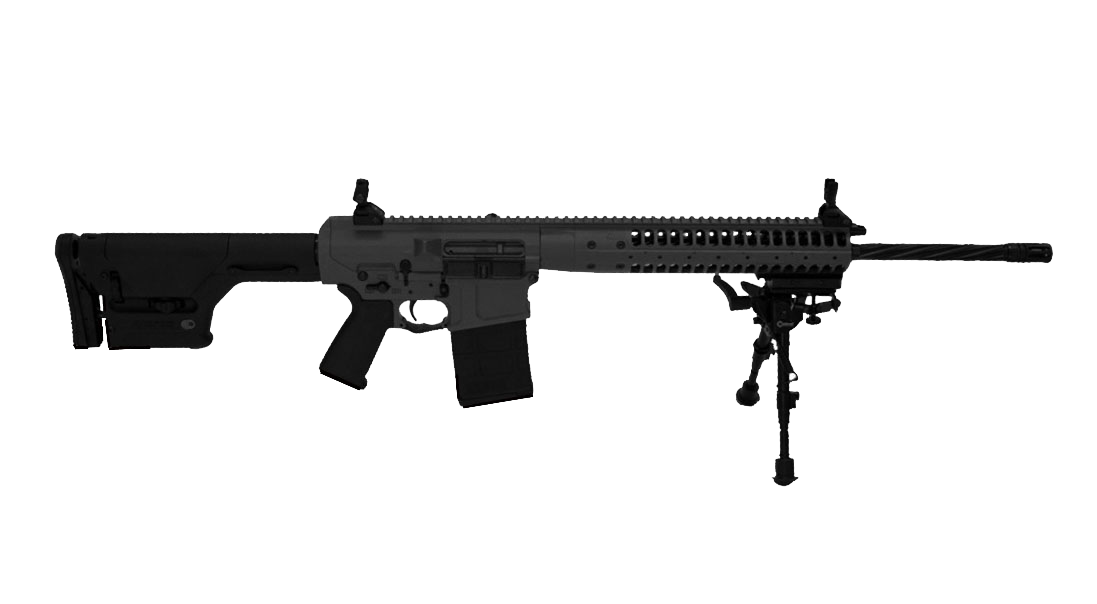
- LWRCI R.E.P.R
- Type: Semi-automatic rifle
- Place of origin: United States

Production history
- Designed: 2010
- Manufacturer: LWRC International
- Unit cost: $4,233.00

Specifications
- Mass: 10.4 lb (4.7 kg)
- Length: 41.25 in (104.8 cm)
- Cartridge: 7.62x51mm NATO; 6.5mm Creedmoor
- Barrels: 20 in (51 cm)
- Action: Short stroke gas piston
- Sights: Iron sights

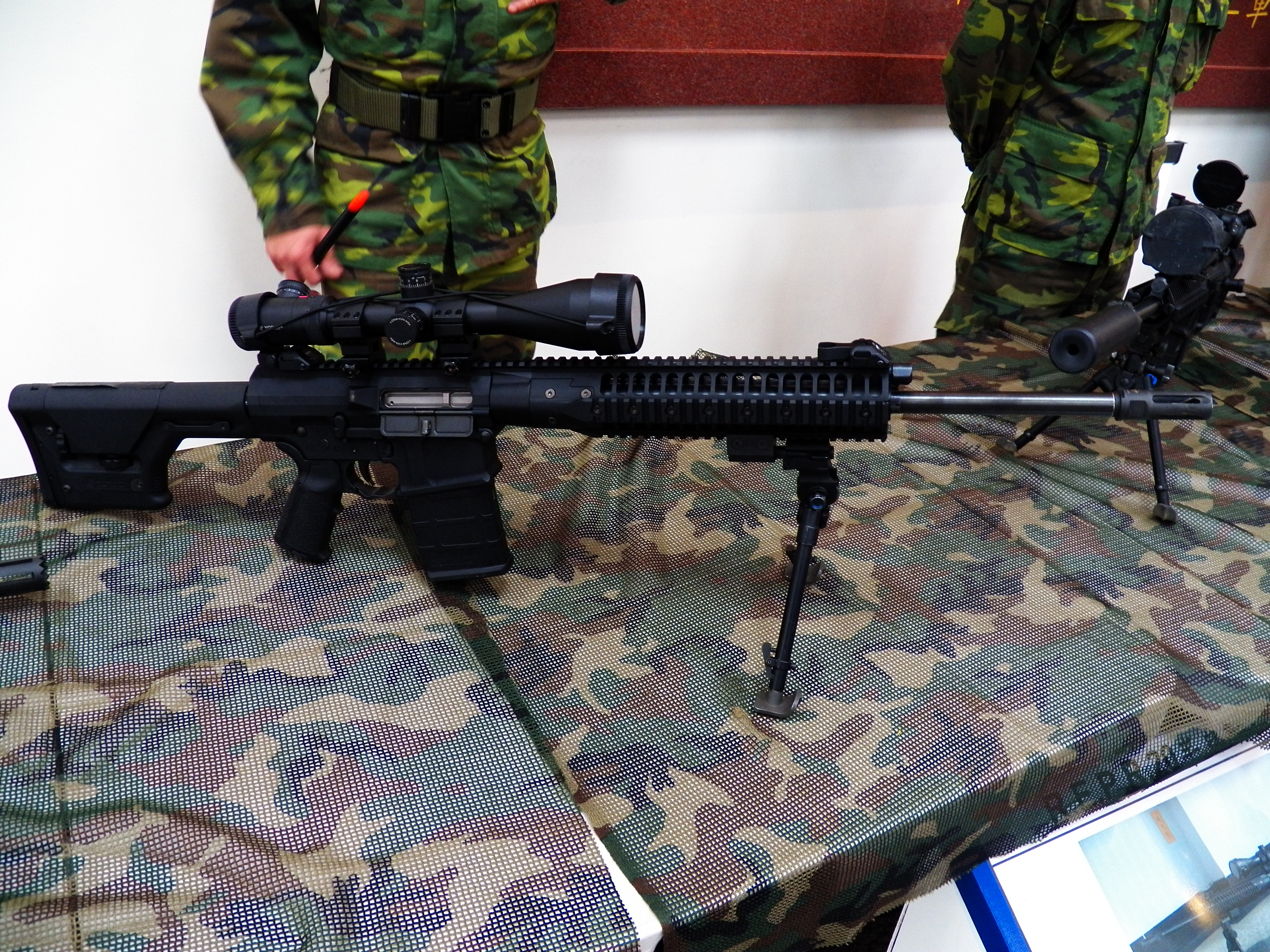
LWRCI R.E.P.R in Taiwanese service

LWRC REPR (Rapid Engagement Precision Rifle) is a semi-automatic rifle manufactured by LWRC International. It is chambered in either 7.62×51mm NATO or 6.5mm Creedmoor.

== Design details ==
The rifle is built on the AR-10 platform which takes a 7.62 mm cartridge. The rifle has a Geissele trigger, and Magpul Industries components. It also has a proprietary 4 port Muzzle brake. It has ambidextrous controls The barrel is cold hammer forged, Black Nitride treated, and has. 1:10 twist. The gun can be fitted with a 20", 16", or 12" barrel. The barrel is carbon fiber-wrapped. The gun has a full-length Picatinny rail.

== Operation ==
The gun operates with a short Stroke piston. It weighs 13 pounds when loaded with ammunition. The gun's purpose is for hunting, long-range shooting competition and law enforcement. The gun is equipped with a 20-round magazine.

== Users ==
- Sweden
- Taiwan

=== Possible Users ===
- Jordan

== See also ==
- Remington Semi Automatic Sniper System
- Colt Canada C20 DMR
- LWRC SABR
