= .460 =

.460 and .460 Magnum may refer to two different firearms cartridges:

- .460 Weatherby Magnum (rifle)
- .460 S&W Magnum (revolver)

.460 can also refer to:

- .460 Steyr (rifle)
- .460 Rowland (pistol)
