= Barrett REC10 =

Selective-fire semi-automatic rifle

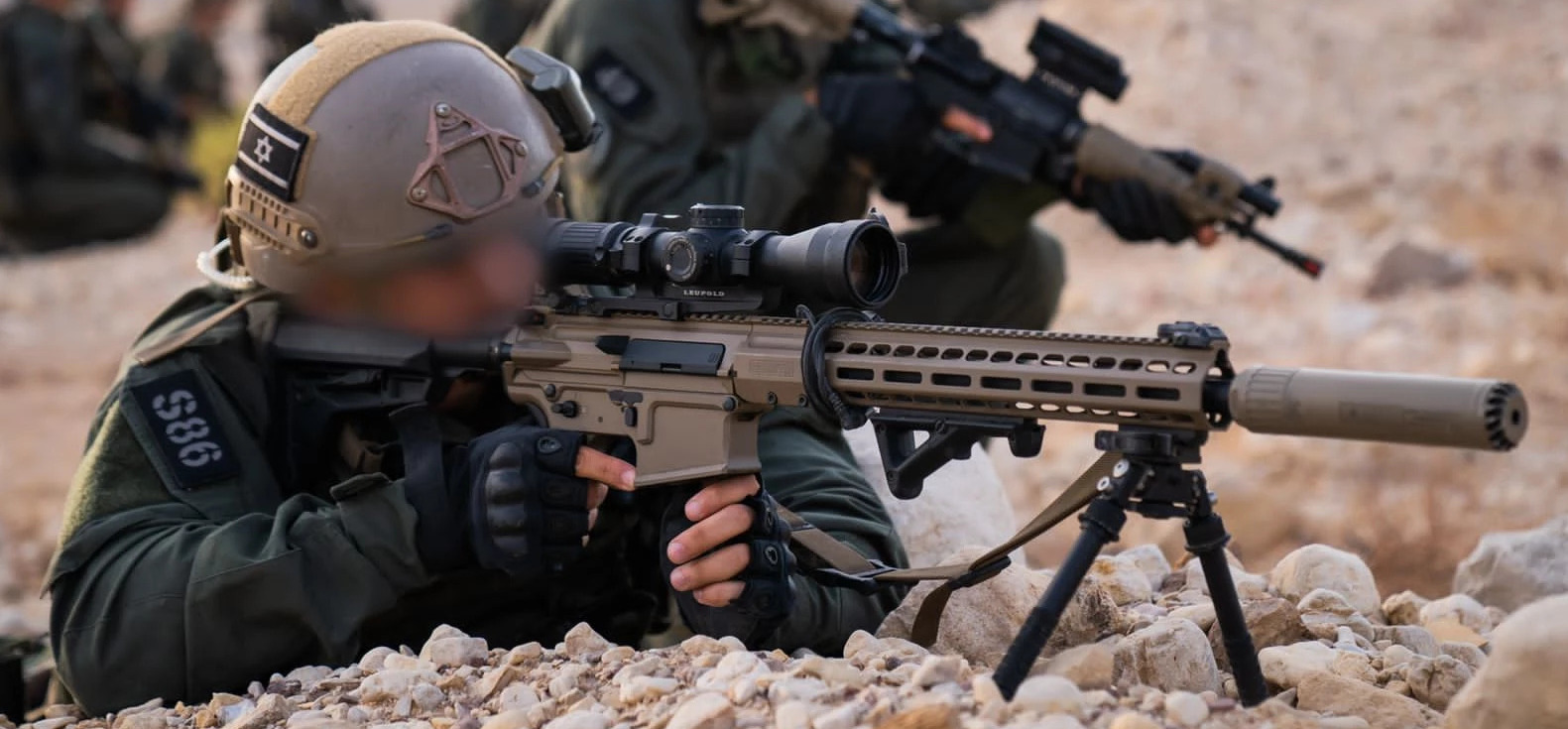
- Soldier with a Barrett REC10
- Type: Designated Marksman Rifle
- Place of origin: United States

Production history
- Manufacturer: Barrett Firearms Manufacturing

Specifications
- Mass: 8.0 lbs (3.6 kg) unloaded.
- Length: 34.5 in (876.3 mm) collapsed
- Caliber: .308 Winchester / 7.62×51mm NATO
- Action: semi-automatic

The Barrett REC10 (designation stands for "reliability-enhanced carbine") is an American selective-fire, semi-automatic rifle chambered in .308 Winchester or 6.5mm Creedmoor, manufactured by Barrett Firearms. The REC10 utilises a direct impingement gas operating system. Most variants of the REC10 have a twist rate of 1:10 and a standard magazine capacity of 20 rounds.

== Design and features ==
The Barrett REC10's upper and lower receivers are machined from a billet of 7075-T6 aluminum. It features a proprietary M-LOK handguard, TB-41 DLC coated bolt carrier group and a chrome-lined chamber. The REC10 comes with an ALG QMS trigger and a Magpul stock, Magpul pistol grip, and Magpul flip-up sights. It also features fully ambidextrous controls.

== Variants ==
The REC10 is available in different factory-configurations that are primarily distinguished by barrel length, barrel material and finish. According to the company, it is "Carbine" version with a 16-inch chrome-lined barrel and a "Long-Range (LR)" or DMR-style version with a 16 or 20-inch stainless steel barrel, available in 6.5 Creedmoor or .308 Winchester.

Both models share the following features: tuned direct-impingement gas system that is optimized for suppressed or unsuppressed firing, billet 7075-T6 aluminum lower and upper receivers, full ambidextrous controls, and free-float M-LOK handguards with full-length top Picatinny rails. Finish and color options have included Black, Tungsten Grey Cerakote and Flat Dark Earth.

== Users ==
- Israel
- Malaysia

== See also ==
- Barrett REC7 - A Barrett Firearms 5.56x45 mm NATO carbine
