= Ferret 50 =

Bolt-action rifle

- Type: Competition
- Place of origin: United States

Production history
- Designed: 2005
- Manufacturer: Spider Firearms
- Variants: .510 DTC SuperComp

Specifications
- Mass: 18 lb (8.2 kg) to 24 lb (11 kg) dependent on cartridge
- Barrel length: 18 in (46 cm) to 18 in (46 cm) dependent on cartridge
- Cartridge: .50BMG
- Action: Bolt-action, single shot

The Ferret 50 is a high-caliber bolt-action rifle developed by Spider Firearms for competition shooting and long-range hunting. It is chambered for .50BMG, .408 CheyTac, and .338 Lapua. The Ferret 50 was initially crafted as an AR conversion for its high adaptability and customization potential. Using a standard AR-15 receiver, it weighs between 18 and 24lb depending on the caliber, and its barrel length ranges from 18" to 36", again depending on the caliber. The barreled upper receiver includes an adjustable bipod. A steel receiver is also available that is provided either with (SuperComp model) or without (Sportsman model) an adjustable monopod on the buttstock. It is a single-shot, meaning it has no magazine, internal or external. The barrel can also be furnished in either chrome-moly or stainless steel.

The Ferret50 barreled upper receiver design is known for its high margin of safety, ease of maintenance, and simple head spacing procedure. One key feature of the Ferret 50 is the fish-gill muzzle brake. This allows the rifle to fire large caliber rounds with controllable recoil but no loss in accuracy.

== Ferret 50 SuperComp ==
The SuperComp Ferret 50 is the competition-level version of the rifle. It can be chambered in all the above mentioned calibers (except .338 Lapua) plus .510 DTC. Among its features are an extended receiver, optional left-handed or right-handed action, adjustable trigger and stock, and detachable rear monopod and forward bipod. As per its purpose, the SuperComp has high customization capabilities, which many purchasers take advantage of.

== Ferret 50 Sportsman ==
Another version of the Ferret 50 is the Sportsman. It is simply a lower-cost version of the SuperComp that does not include a monopod and is intended for more casual shooters and hunters. It has no significant difference between Sportsman and the SuperComp except for caliber—the Sportsman does not come in .510 DTC but can be chambered for .338 Lapua.
