= LWRC M6 =

Series of US military carbines based on the M4 carbine

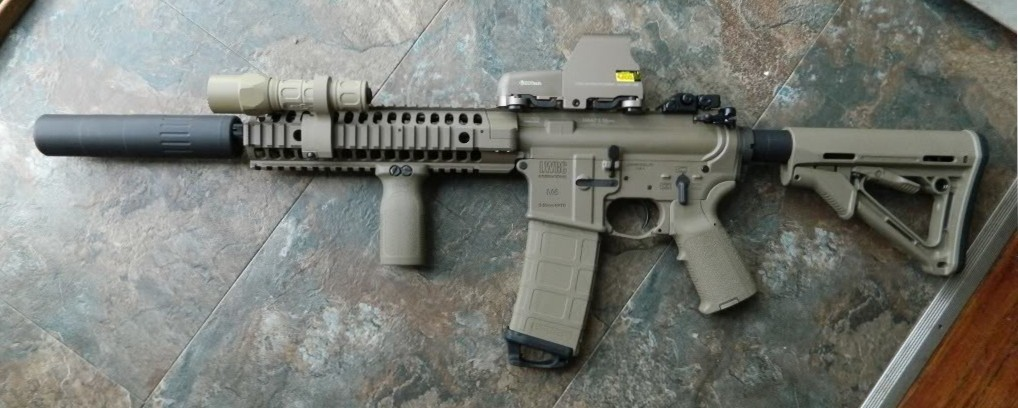
- LWRC M6A2 in a short barrel configuration with a cerakote "flat dark earth" finish, suppressor and holographic sight.
- Type: Assault rifle Carbine
- Place of origin: United States

Production history
- Designer: LWRC International
- Manufacturer: LWRC International
- Unit cost: US$2,350
- Produced: 2006–present
- Variants: See Variants

Specifications
- Cartridge: 5.56×45mm NATO; 6.8mm Remington SPC
- Action: Gas-operated short-stroke piston, rotating bolt
- Rate of fire: 700–900 rounds/min
- Muzzle velocity: 2,800 ft/s (850 m/s) (5.56 mm from a 14.7 in barrel); 2,500 ft/s (760 m/s) (6.8 mm SPC from a 14.7 in barrel)
- Feed system: STANAG-compliant magazine Barrett magazine (6.8 mm models)
- Sights: BUIS Flip-Up iron sights

The LWRC M6 is a series of carbines designed and manufactured by LWRC International. The 'M' model name is not a US military designation.

== Design ==
The LWRC M6 is based on the M4 carbine, with which it shares 80% of its parts.

Like the HK416, M6 features a proprietary short-stroke self-regulating gas piston system and bolt carrier/carrier key design, which prevents trapped gases from contacting the bolt carrier or receiver of the weapon.

LWRC International claims that this reduces the heating and carbon fouling of the internals, simplifies field maintenance, and improves reliability.

Standard length barrel is 16.1 in, featuring a 1:7″ twist (six lands, right twist) barrel with a ferritic nitrocarburized surface conversion which covers the barrel, inside and out, as well as the piston components.

Barrel lengths of 10.5″, 12.7″, 14.7″ and 18″ (available for select models) are available.

== Variants ==
=== M6 ===
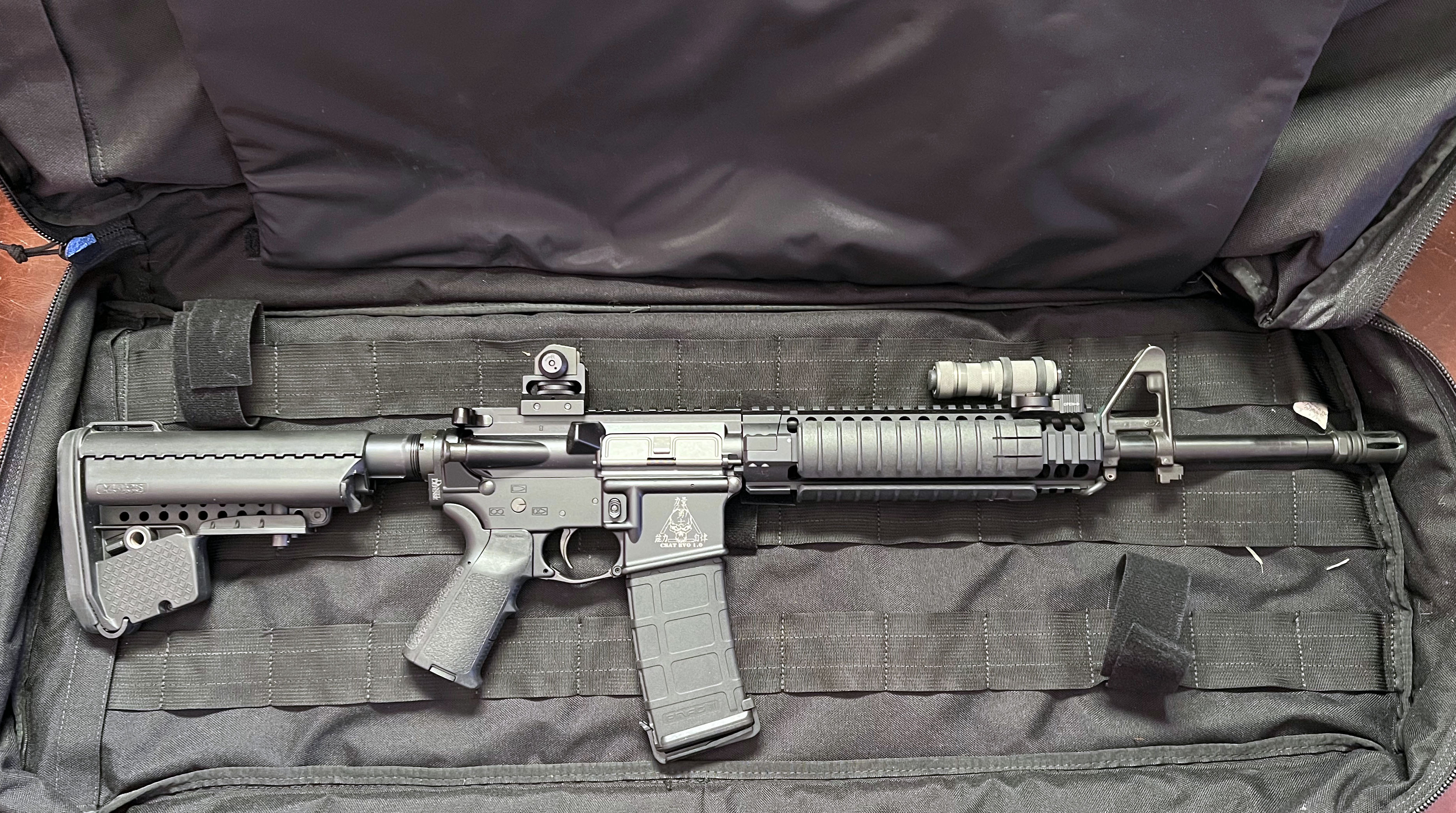
Paul Howe signature edition LWRCI CSAT M6 A1 EVO 1.0

The M6 is LWRC's most basic model. It is the most similar to the M4, but it still has the short-stroke gas piston system common to all LWRC's models.

The M6 has now been replaced by the M6-SL (stretch lightweight) as LWRC's most basic offering.

=== M6A1 ===
The M6A1 is also similar to the M4, but is designed to accept SOPMOD accessories similar to the M4A1 used by USSOCOM.

The difference between the M6 and the A1 model is the addition of a rail system.

=== M6A2 ===
The M6A2 is identified by LWRC as its "standard carbine" and has features that allow it to be used in multiple roles beyond a rifle, such as an optional longer barrel allowing it to be used as a designated marksman rifle.

All A2 series use flip-up iron sights mounted to Mil Std 1913 style rail interfaces as the A2 series lacks a built-in sighting system like those found on A1 and A3 models.

=== Personal Security Detail ===
The LWRC PSD is an ultra-short barrel carbine with an 8-inch barrel and Magpul CTR stock.

Derived from the M6A2 carbine, it comes chambered in 5.56mm NATO or 6.8mm Remington SPC.

It is also available without a stock as the M6A2-P Pistol, but is semi-automatic and also chambered in 5.56mm and 6.8mm Remington SPC.

=== M6A3 ===
The M6A3 is designed specifically to be a designated marksman rifle. This rifle uses a midlength short stroke gas piston system to reduce recoil and increases the speed of follow up shots.

The M6A3 features an adjustable gas system to allow the user to adapt the rifle to different conditions and is designed to accommodate optics such as scopes and reflex sights. The A3 integrates a gas block using a flip up front sight as opposed to the fixed AR series sight of the M6 and M6A1.

=== M6A4 ===
The M6A4 was designed to fulfill the role of the squad automatic weapon.

Externally identical to the M6A3, it fires from a closed bolt during semi-automatic fire, and from an open bolt during automatic fire which is labeled as "OBA" for Open Bolt Automatic.

While in OBA mode, the first round may be fired from a closed bolt (it will then lock back and subsequent shots will be from an open bolt until the operator manually closes the bolt again).

Firing from an open bolt increases cooling and eliminates the potential for accidental discharges due to rounds "cooking off" in an overheated chamber. It also allows for a faster rate of fire.

However, an open bolt design meant that the first round fired will have reduced accuracy when compared to a closed bolt design. This is due to the fact that when the trigger is pulled, the bolt slams forward under spring tension, stripping a round from the feeding device, chambering it, then firing it.

This sequence of events shakes the firearm and takes longer than a closed bolt design to fire the first round (greater lock time). This also introduces extra potential points of failure in the ignition of the first round.

=== M6 Individual Carbine ===
Developed for the eventually cancelled US Army Individual Carbine Competition, the Individual Carbine is a 5.56×45mm weapons system.

First batch units used a spiral-fluted barrel in either 14.7 inches or 16.1 inches. Later units returned to a more conventional style.

The front gas block differed from other M6-series via a bayonet mounting gas block with flip-up iron sight. The IC-SPR, a sub-variant of the IC, sported a low-profile gas block.

The system used a monoforged rail system that was forged as part of the upper receiver. The system uses a slight extension of the foreend of the upper receiver that attaches the handguard, unlike traditional systems that utilize a barrel nut to connect the handguard system to the upper receiver. This results in greater stability and higher durability.

IC comes standard with a Magpul MOE pistol grip, and either a Magpul stock or a proprietary compact stock.

=== Six8 ===
The Six8 is a derivative of the M6-series with variants conforming to the M6A2, M6A2 SPR and PSD but engineered specifically around the 6.8×43mm SPCII round.

LWRCI partnered with ATK and Magpul to develop the Six8 to fulfill a large overseas military contract. ATK developed the contract ammunition, a 90-grain Gold Dot round optimized for short-barreled rifles. Magpul created a larger variation of their PMAG magazine, called the "Black Widow," with a blood-red follower for the 6.8mm round. The upper and lower receivers were developed specifically to fit this Magpul magazine and optimized around the 6.8×43mm round.

The flagship model of the Six8 series is the UCIW which features an 8.5-inch barrel. The A2 and SPR variations feature longer barrel lengths including 12.7, 14.7, and 16.1 inches. Weapons of this series come standard with Magpul MOE pistol grips, LWRCI proprietary compact stocks, and iron sights.

== Adoption ==
The M6A2 was an approved personal purchase duty carbine of the United States Drug Enforcement Administration in a special configuration called the M6A2 D-DEA, however, it is not standard issue.

The M6A2 UCIW (Ultra Compact Individual Weapon) was adopted around 2012 in limited numbers by the UK Special Forces. The 7-inch (178 mm) barrel and the overall length of the carbine at 22-inches (559 mm) met the key requirement in the UKSF trials that produced the weapon, which competed successfully for the British contract against the HK416C.

The 5.56×45mm NATO UCIW weighs 6.25 lb (2.83 kg) and is apparently intended for use by UKSF dog handlers, team leaders, signallers and for use in vehicles and whilst conducting covert reconnaissance and close protection, replacing the 9×19mm Parabellum MP5K machine pistol in the latter role. The weapon is often seen in Afghanistan with a SureFire suppressor and either an Aimpoint, Trijicon, or EO Tech optic.

It was developed for the United States Marine Corps' Infantry Automatic Rifle program, which sought to replace some M249s with a more maneuverable weapon. However, it was not accepted for final testing in favor of a Heckler & Koch HK416 variant.

== Users ==
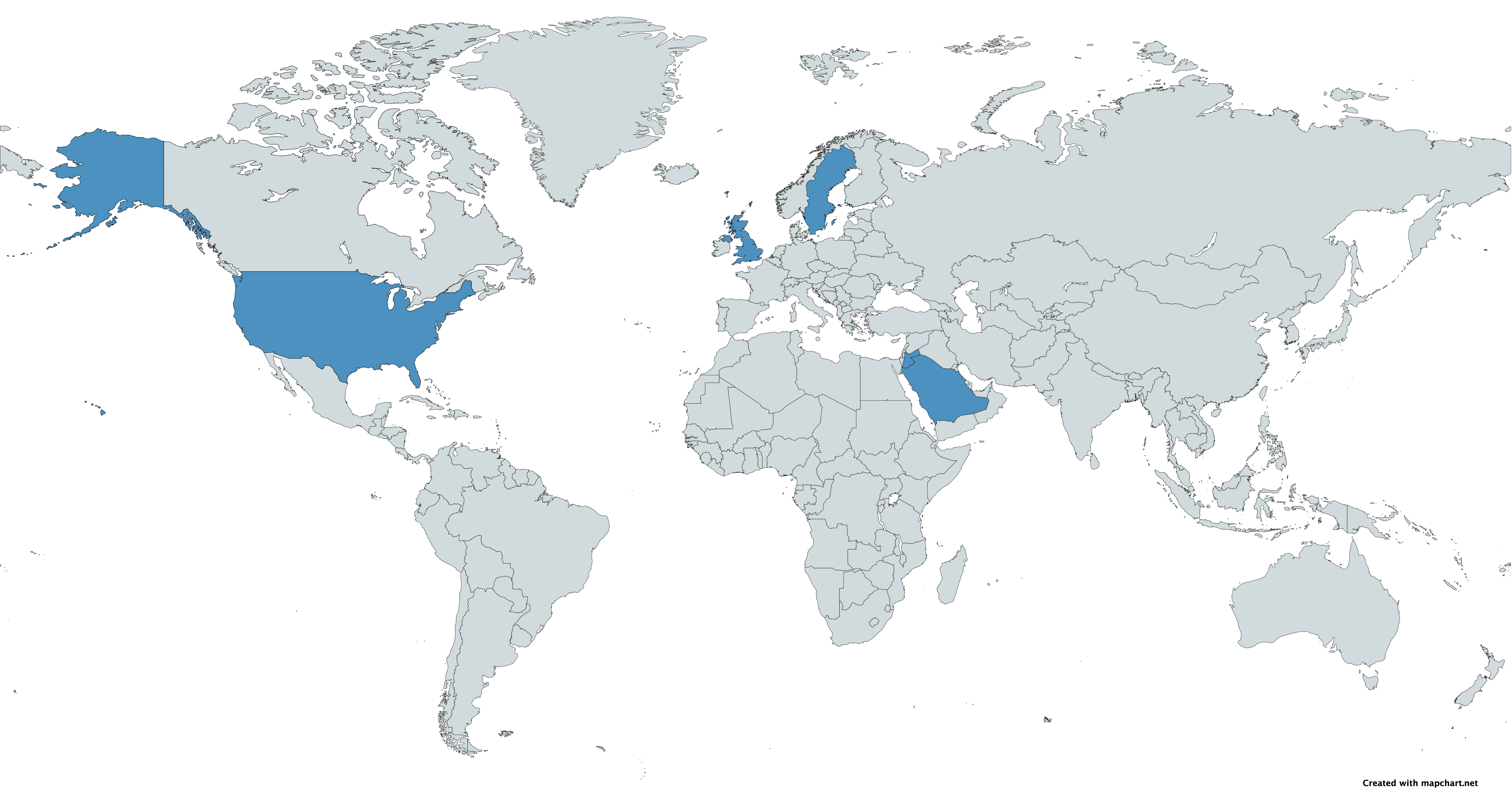
A map with users of the LWRC M6 in blue

| Country | Organization | Model | Reference |
|---|---|---|---|
| Jordan | Royal Guard | 6.8 PSD | |
| Saudi Arabia | Royal Guard Regiment | Six8 UCIW | |
| Sweden | SOG and police tactical units | M6IC & ICA5 300BLK Upper Receivers | |
| United Kingdom | United Kingdom Special Forces | M6A2 UCIW | |
| United States | Drug Enforcement Administration (DEA) | M6A2 D-DEA | |
| United States | Pentagon Force Protection Agency (PFPA) | M6A2 | |
