= Steyr HS .50 =

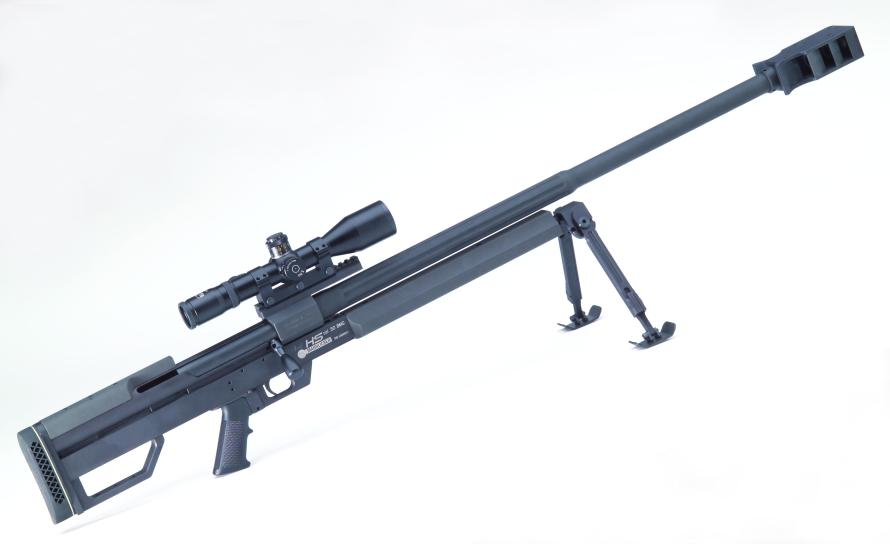
- Steyr HS .50
- Type: Anti-materiel rifle
- Place of origin: Austria

Service history
- Used by: See Users
- Wars: Iraq War; Syrian Civil War; War in Iraq (2013–2017); Yemeni Civil War (2014–present); Russo–Ukrainian War (2014–present); 2014 Gaza war Gaza war

Production history
- Designer: Heinrich Fortmeier
- Manufacturer: Steyr Mannlicher; Defense Industries Organization (Iranian copy); Golan Rifle Plant (Syrian copy)
- Produced: 2004
- Variants: HS .460; HS .50 M1

Specifications (HS .50)
- Mass: 12.4 kg (28.5 lbs)
- Length: 1,370 mm (54 inches)
- Barrel length: 833 mm (33 inches)
- Cartridge: .50 BMG; .460 Steyr
- Caliber: .50 BMG
- Action: Bolt action
- Effective firing range: up-to 1500m
- Feed system: Single shot (HS .50, HS .460); 5 round detachable box magazine (HS .50 M1)

The Steyr HS .50 and the Steyr HS .460 are single-shot anti-materiel rifles manufactured by Steyr Mannlicher and chambered in .50 BMG and .460 Steyr, respectively. Unlicensed variants of the HS. 50 include the AM-50 Sayyad produced by Iran, the Golan S-01 produced by Syria and the Al-Ghoul rifle produced by the Al-Qassam Brigades.

== Design and features ==
The Steyr HS .50 is a single-shot bolt-action rifle. It has no built-in magazine, and each round has to be loaded directly into the ejection port and is pushed into the chamber by the bolt. The fluted barrel is cold hammer-forged and has an effective range of up to 1,500 m. It has an adjustable bipod, a muzzle brake that reduces recoil significantly, and a Picatinny rail for the installation of various optics.

The original Steyr HS-50 was designed by Heinrich Fortmeier, on behalf of Steyr Arms.

== Variants ==
=== HS .460 ===
The HS .460 is chambered for the .460 Steyr round, developed for markets where ownership of the .50 BMG by private citizens is banned but .46 caliber rounds are not, such as California.

=== HS-50 ===
The HS-50 is a single shot bolt action .50 BMG rifle, with 2 barrel length options (29" / 33"), the rifle comes standard with a 0 MOA picatinny rail.

=== HS-50 M1 ===
The HS .50 M1 is an evolution of the HS .50. It is magazine-fed from a five-round magazine feeding horizontally left from the receiver, has a longer top Picatinny rail and more Picatinny rails on the side, an adjustable cheekpiece, a newly designed fixable bipod, and a monopod at the buttstock.

=== AM-50 Sayyad ===
Iran produces an unlicensed copy under the name AM-50 Sayyad. The AM-50 has been in production since 2008 and has been widely exported to Middle Eastern militias friendly to Iran. Because of its widespread proliferation, AM-50 rifles have also been supplied to or captured by groups opposed to Iran, such as Syrian rebels. The AM-50 reportedly has much worse fit and finish than the original Steyr HS .50. These copies are manufactured by the Iranian state-controlled Defence Industries Organization's (DIO) Individual Combat Industries Group (ICIG).

=== Golan S-01 ===
In June 2018, media organizations affiliated with the Syrian government reported that Syria had begun producing an unlicensed variant of the rifle, dubbed the Golan S-01, in reference to the Golan Heights. Its first prototype was issued in 2015. Unlike the original HS .50, the Golan S-01 fires the Soviet 12.7×108mm anti-materiel rifle cartridge. It is slightly heavier than the HS.50, weighing in at 13.5 kg and has an effective firing range of 1,600 meters, a 100-meter improvement over the previous generation of anti-materiel rifles used by the Syrian Army. It is also 100 mm longer than the HS .50, measuring in at 1,470mm total length. It is manufactured by Golan Rifle Plant. In 2023, the SSRC has upgraded the Syrian produced Golan S-01 AMR. New model Golan S-01 Mk.2 was introduced with a new stock, box magazine, and scope.

=== Al-Ghoul ===
Named after the Hamas engineer and senior operative Adnan al-Ghoul, the Al-Ghoul is an upgraded variant of the original Steyr HS .50 rifle manufactured in Palestine by the Al-Qassam Brigades. With a length of over 1.5 meters, it measures as one of the world’s longest sniper rifles, and has variants chambered for 14.5mm and 12.7mm caliber ammunition. The rifle has a reported effective range of 2000 meters, 500 meters greater than the original Steyr. Hamas first used this rifle in the 2014 Gaza war. The group also stated that these rifles are “evidence of the distinction of its military industries”.

== Users ==
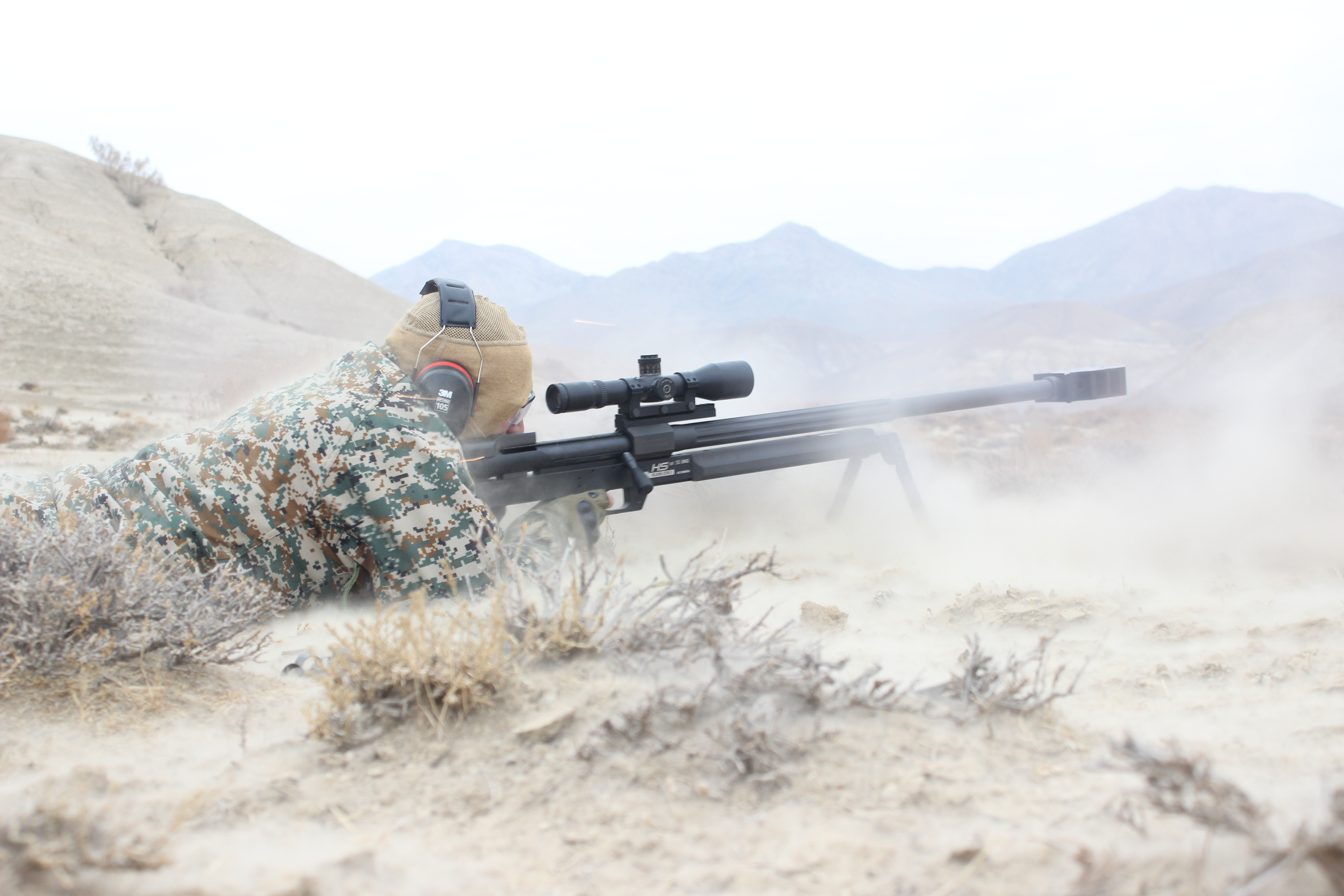
Steyr HS-50 Iranian sniper

- Argentina - Used by Argentine Army.
- Bolivia - Used by Bolivian Army.
- Iran - 800 rifles were purchased in 2006.
- Romania - Used by Brigada Specială de Intervenție a Jandarmeriei
- Russia - Used by police forces and special forces.
- Ukraine - Used by HUR.

=== AM-50 Sayyad / Golan S-01 operators ===
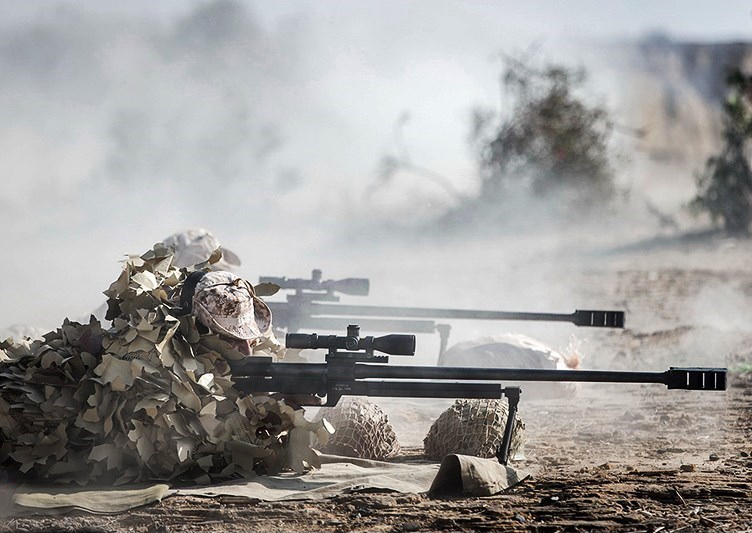
AM-50 Sayyad used by Iranian Navy Takavaran

- Hamas
- Hezbollah
- Houthis
- Iran
- Iraq - Iraqi Special Operations Forces and the Iraqi Ground Forces.
  - Asa'ib Ahl al-Haq
  - Badr Organization
  - Harakat Hezbollah al-Nujaba
  - Kata'ib Sayyid al-Shuhada
  - Saraya al-Salam (until 2021)
  - Saraya al-Khorasani
- Islamic State
- Kurdistan Workers' Party (PKK)
- Liwa al-Zulfiqar
- Saraya al-Aqida
- Saraya Ashura
- Syria
  - Liwa Fatemiyoun
  - National Guard
  - Tahrir al-Sham
  - Syrian National Army

=== “Ghoul” variant operators ===
- Qassam Brigades
- (Palestinian Islamic Jihad) Al-Quds Brigades
- Al-Aqsa Martyrs' Brigades (in Gaza)

== Gallery ==
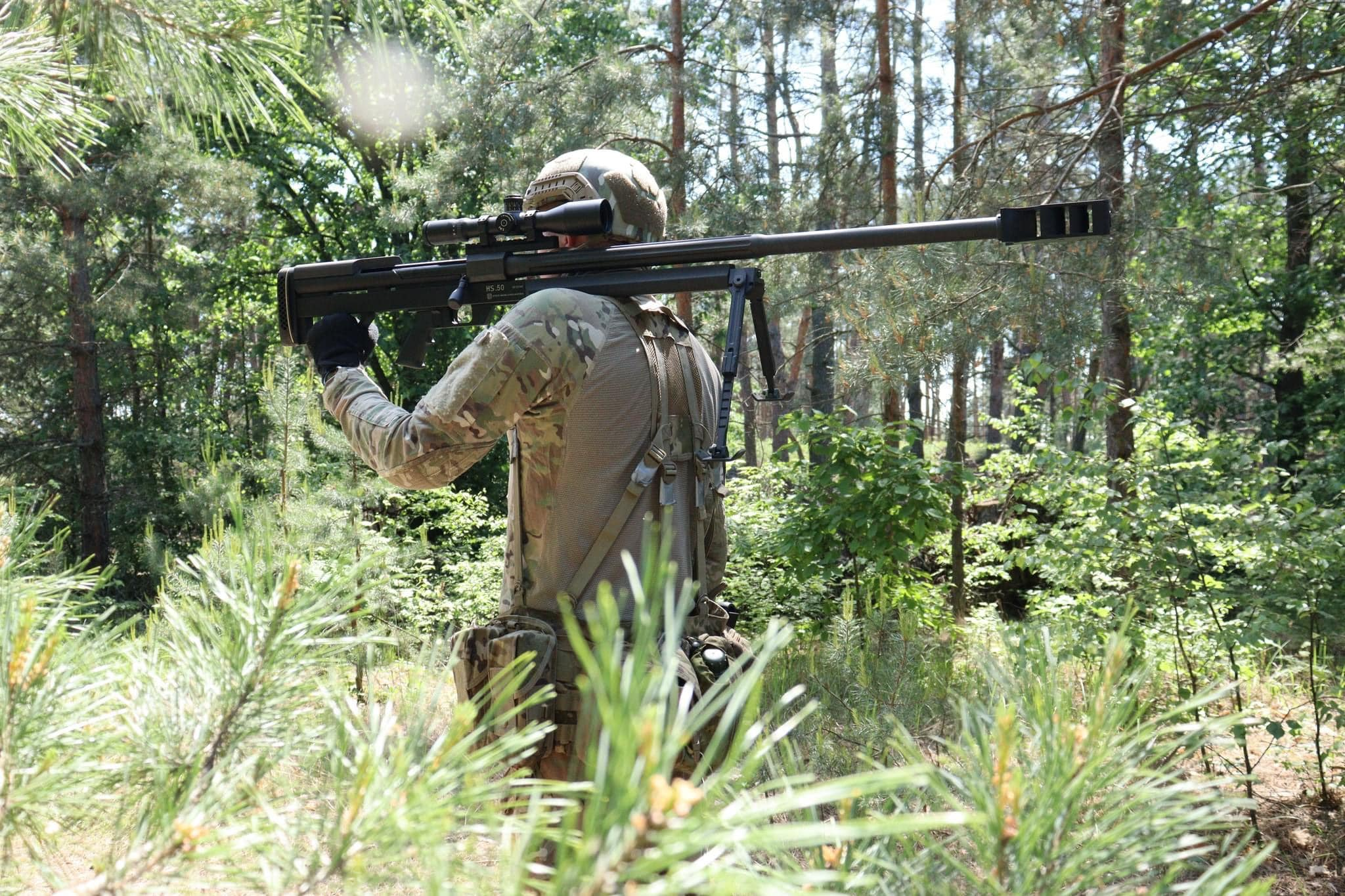
Ukrainian HUR soldier in 2022

== See also ==
- Barrett M82, an American anti-materiel rifle
- Denel NTW-20, a South African anti-materiel rifle
- KSVK 12.7, a Russian anti-materiel rifle
- PGM Hécate II, a French anti-materiel rifle
- Steyr SSG 69, an Austrian bolt-action sniper rifle
