= 6.8mm Remington SPC =

Intermediate rifle cartridge

6.8×43mm Remington SPC
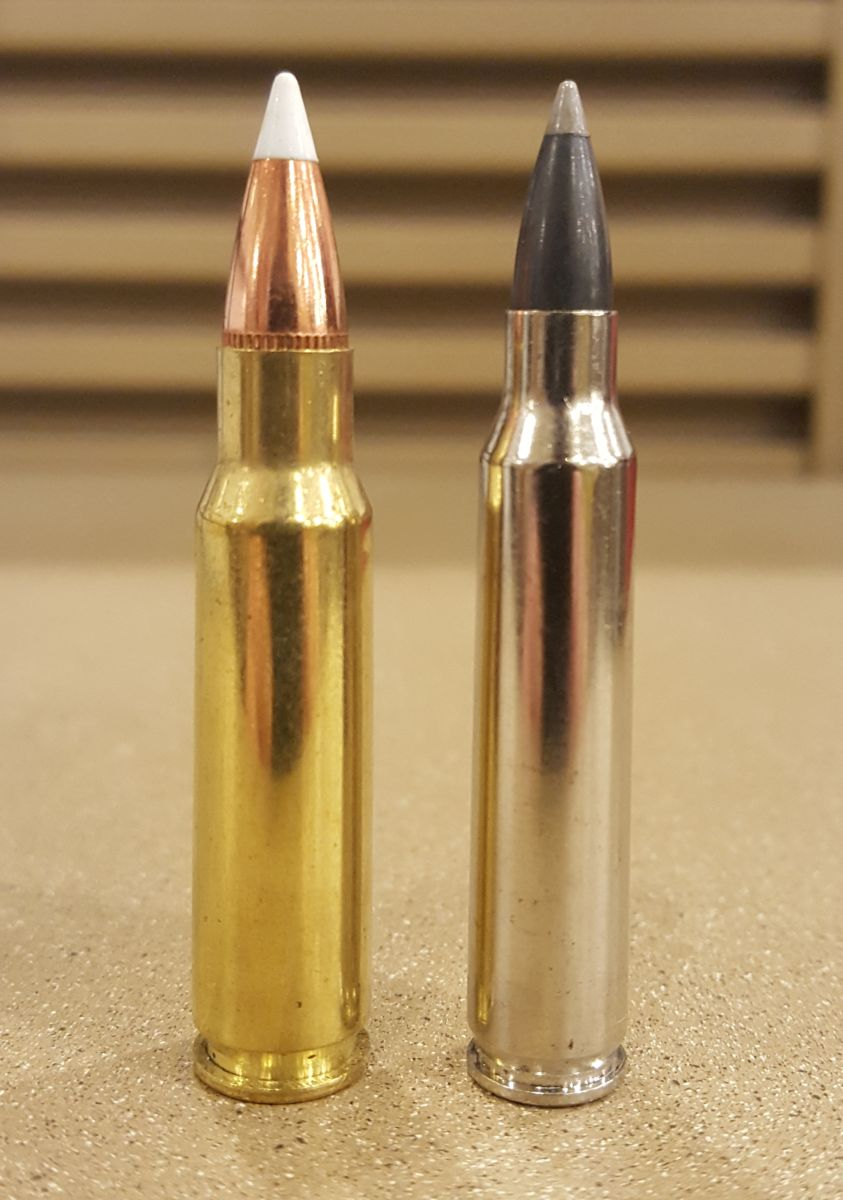
- 6.8 SPC (left), 5.56×45mm NATO (right)
- Place of origin: United States

Production history
- Designer: Remington Arms, USSOCOM
- Designed: 2002–2004

Specifications
- Parent case: .30 Remington
- Case type: Rimless, bottlenecked
- Bullet diameter: 0.277 in (7.0 mm)
- Land diameter: 0.270 in (6.9 mm)
- Neck diameter: 0.306 in (7.8 mm)
- Shoulder diameter: 0.402 in (10.2 mm)
- Base diameter: 0.422 in (10.7 mm)
- Rim diameter: 0.422 in (10.7 mm)
- Rim thickness: 0.049 in (1.2 mm)
- Case length: 1.687 in (42.8 mm)
- Overall length: 2.260 in (57.4 mm)
- Case capacity: 34.8–36.9 gr H_{2}O (2.26–2.39 cm^{3})
- Primer type: Large Rifle
- Maximum pressure (C.I.P): 58,700 psi (405 MPa)
- Maximum pressure (SAAMI): 55,000 psi (380 MPa)

Ballistic performance
Bullet mass/type	Velocity	Energy
7.45 g (115 gr) Full Metal Jacket	2,575 ft/s (785 m/s)	1,694 ft⋅lbf (2,297 J)
7.78 g (120 gr) SST	2,460 ft/s (750 m/s)	1,612 ft⋅lbf (2,186 J)
7.1 g (110 gr) Sierra Pro Hunter	2,500 ft/s (760 m/s)	1,525 ft⋅lbf (2,068 J)
5.5 g (85 gr) Barnes TSX with "tactical" factory SSA load	3,070 ft/s (940 m/s)	1,780 ft⋅lbf (2,410 J)
- Test barrel length: 410 mm (16 in); Source

The 6.8mm Remington Special Purpose Cartridge (6.8 SPC, 6.8 SPC II or 6.8×43mm) is a rimless bottlenecked intermediate rifle cartridge that was developed by Remington Arms in collaboration with members of the U.S. Army Marksmanship Unit and United States Special Operations Command to possibly replace the 5.56 NATO cartridge in short barreled rifles (SBR) and carbines. Based on the .30 Remington cartridge, it is between the 5.56×45mm NATO and 7.62×51mm NATO in bore diameter. It uses the same 0.277 inch diameter bullet (usually not the same mass) as the .270 Winchester hunting cartridge.

== Development ==
The 6.8 SPC was designed to address the deficiencies of the terminal ballistics of the 5.56×45mm NATO cartridge currently in service with the armed forces of all NATO-aligned countries. The cartridge was the result of the Enhanced Rifle Cartridge Program. The 6.8 SPC (6.8×43mm) was initially developed by Master Sergeant Steve Holland and Chris Murray, a United States Army Marksmanship Unit gunsmith, to offer superior downrange lethality over the 5.56 NATO/.223 Remington in an M16-pattern service rifle with minimal loss of magazine capacity and a negligible increase in recoil.

The program started the design by using a .30 Remington case, which was modified in length to fit into magazines that would be accommodated by the magazine wells of the M16 family of rifles and carbines that are currently in service with the U.S. Armed Forces.

In tests comparing various caliber bullets using a .30 Remington parent case, Holland and Murray determined that a 6.5 mm caliber projectile had the best accuracy and penetration, with historical data going back for decades of US Army exterior and terminal ballistic testing, but a 7 mm projectile had the best terminal performance. The combination of the cartridge case, powder load, and projectile easily outperformed the 7.62×39mm and 5.45×39mm Soviet cartridges, with the new cartridge's muzzle velocity proving to be about 61 m/s (200 ft/s) faster than the 7.62x39.

The 6.8mm Remington SPC was designed to perform better in short-barreled CQB rifles after diminished performance from the 5.56 NATO when the M16A4 was changed from the rifle configuration to the current M4 carbine. The 6.8 SPC delivers 44% more energy than the 5.56mm NATO (M4 configuration) at 100–300 m (330–980 ft). The 6.8mm SPC is not the ballistic equal of the 7.62×51mm NATO cartridge, but it has less recoil, has been said to be more controllable in rapid fire, and is lighter, allowing operators to carry more ammunition than would otherwise be possible with the larger caliber round. The 6.8 mm generates around 2,385 J (1,759 ft⋅lbf) of muzzle energy with a 7.5-gram (115 gr) bullet. In comparison, the 5.56×45mm round (which the 6.8 is designed to replace) generates around 1,796 J (1,325 ft⋅lbf) with a 4.0 g (62 gr) bullet, giving the 6.8 mm a terminal ballistic advantage over the 5.56 mm of 588 J (434 ft⋅lbf). One of the enigmatic features of this cartridge is its being designed for a shorter-barrel carbine-length rifle than the standard rifle length is (usually 41 cm (16 in)). The round only gains about 7.6–10.7 m/s (25–35 ft/s) for every 25 mm of barrel length past the standard 410 mm (16 in) barrel (all else being equal) up to barrel lengths around 560–610 mm (22–24 in) with no gain or loss in accuracy. It also does well in rifles with less than 410 mm (16 in) barrels. In recent developments (the period 2008–2012) the performance of the 6.8 SPC has been increased by approximately 61 to 91 m/s (200 to 300 ft/s) by the work of ammunition manufacturer Silver State Armory LLC (SSA) and a few custom rifle builders using and designing the correct chamber and barrel specifications. The 6.8mm Remington SPC cartridge weighs, depending on the manufacturer and load, between 16.8 and 17.6 grams (259 and 272 gr). Also, more recently, LWRC, Magpul and Alliant Techsystems (ATK) introduced a new AR-15 designed for the 6.8 SPC which allows for a proprietary 6.8 Magpul P-mags and an overall cartridge length of 5.9 cm (2.32 in). The personal defense weapon (PDW) known as the "Six8" is an SPC II with 1:250 mm (10 in) twist and is able to use all current 6.8 SPC factory ammunition.

=== Muzzle velocity from a 610-millimeter (24 in) barrel ===
7.1-gram (110 gr) Nosler Accubond	870 m/s (2,840 ft/s) – Silver State Armory (SSA)
7.5-gram (115 gr) OTM	850 m/s (2,800 ft/s) – Remington Premier Match
5.5-gram (85 gr) Nosler E-Tip	940 m/s (3,100 ft/s) – SSA
5.8-gram (90 gr) Nosler BSB	910 m/s (2,980 ft/s) – SSA
7.1-gram (110 gr) Hornady BTHP TAP	820 m/s (2,700 ft/s) – Hornady Law Enforcement "tactical" factory load
7.5-gram (115 gr) OTM (FMJ)	831 m/s (2,725 ft/s) – SSA
7.5-gram (115 gr) Boat tail hollow point (BTHP)	850 m/s (2,800 ft/s)
7.5-gram (115 gr) Sierra Match King (SMK)	850 m/s (2,800 ft/s)
7.1-gram (110 gr) Hornady V-MAX	850 m/s (2,800 ft/s)
7.1-gram (110 gr) SCHP	850 m/s (2,800 ft/s) – SSA "combat" factory load
7.1-gram (110 gr) BTHP OTM & Barnes TSX	840 m/s (2,750 ft/s) – Wilson "combat" factory load
5.5-gram (85 gr) Barnes TSX	970 m/s (3,180 ft/s) – SSA "tactical" factory load
5.8-gram (90 gr) Speer Gold Dot	930 m/s (3,050 ft/s) – Federal(ATK) "tac/mil" load

=== Muzzle velocity from a 510-millimeter (20 in) barrel ===
7.1-gram (110 gr) Nosler Accubond	850 m/s (2,800 ft/s)- Silver State Armory (SSA)
7.5-gram (115 gr) OTM	820 m/s (2,700 ft/s)- Remington Premier Match
6.2-gram (95 gr) Barnes TTSX	880 m/s (2,880 ft/s) – Doubletap
5.8-gram (90 gr) Bonded Defense JSP	910 m/s (2,980 ft/s) – Doubletap
6.5-gram (100 gr) Nosler Accubond	855 m/s (2,805 ft/s) – Doubletap
7.1-gram (110 gr) Nosler Accubond	830 m/s (2,710 ft/s) – Doubletap
7.5-gram (115 gr) Full metal jacket boat tail	806 m/s (2,645 ft/s) – Doubletap
5.8-gram (90 gr) Speer TNT	910 m/s (2,980 ft/s)- SSA

=== Muzzle velocity from a 410-millimeter (16 in) barrel ===
7.1-gram (110 gr) Nosler Accubond	820 m/s (2,700 ft/s)- Silver State Armory (SSA)
7.5-gram (115 gr) OTM	800 m/s (2,625 ft/s)- Remington Premier Match
5.5-gram (85 gr) Barnes TSX	920 m/s (3,030 ft/s) – SSA
5.5-gram (85 gr) Nosler E-Tip	900 m/s (2,950 ft/s) – SSA
5.8-gram (90 gr) Nosler BSB	870 m/s (2,840 ft/s) – SSA
7.1-gram (110 gr) Hornady V-MAX	810 m/s (2,650 ft/s)
7.5-gram (115 gr) Sierra Match King (SMK)	810 m/s (2,650 ft/s)
7.5-gram (115 gr) OTM (FMJ)	785 m/s (2,575 ft/s) – SSA
5.5-gram (85 gr) Barnes TSX	940 m/s (3,070 ft/s) – SSA "tactical" factory load
5.8-gram (90 gr) Speer Gold Dot	880 m/s (2,900 ft/s)- Federal(ATK) "tac/mil" load
6.2-gram (95 gr) Barnes TTSX	790 m/s (2,600 ft/s) – Wilson Combat factory load
7.1-gram (110 gr) SCHP	810 m/s (2,650 ft/s) – SSA "combat" factory load
7.1-gram (110 gr) Hornady BTHP TAP	780 m/s (2,550 ft/s) – Hornady Law Enforcement "tactical" factory load
7.1-gram (110 gr) BTHP OTM & Barnes TSX	790 m/s (2,600 ft/s) – Wilson "combat" factory load
9.1-gram (140 gr) Berger VLD	732 m/s (2,401 ft/s) – SSA factory load. (Discontinued)

=== Comparison to other military calibers ===
Cartridge	Muzzle velocity	180 m (200 yd) drop	180 m (200 yd) velocity	370 m (400 yd) drop	370 m (400 yd) velocity
5.56×45mm 3.6 g (55 gr) M193	937 m/s (3,073 ft/s)	56 mm (2.2 in)	717 m/s (2,353 ft/s)	710 mm (27.8 in)	531 m/s (1,743 ft/s)
5.56×45mm 5.0 g (77 gr) OTM	817 m/s (2,679 ft/s)	84 mm (3.3 in)	675 m/s (2,216 ft/s)	830 mm (32.7 in)	550 m/s (1,810 ft/s)
6.8×43mm SPC 7.5 g (115 gr) SMK	810 m/s (2,650 ft/s)	89 mm (3.5 in)	653 m/s (2,143 ft/s)	900 mm (35.4 in)	511 m/s (1,677 ft/s)
6.8×43mm SPC 7.1 g (110 gr) V-MAX	810 m/s (2,650 ft/s)	84 mm (3.3 in)	673 m/s (2,208 ft/s)	790 mm (31.1 in)	552 m/s (1,811 ft/s)
7.62×39mm	700 m/s (2,300 ft/s)	84 mm (3.3 in)	545 m/s (1,787 ft/s)	1,370 mm (53.8 in)	404 m/s (1,324 ft/s)
7.62×51mm 10.9 g (168 gr) SMK	790 m/s (2,600 ft/s)	86 mm (3.4 in)	681 m/s (2,235 ft/s)	820 mm (32.3 in)	576 m/s (1,891 ft/s)

Typical trajectory information from carbines with drop and velocity calculated at sea level with a 91 m (100 yd) zero.

== Applications ==
=== Military and law enforcement adoption ===
By late 2004 the 6.8×43mm SPC was said to be performing well in the field against enemy combatants in special operations. However the cartridge was not used by conventional US military personnel. It was not adopted for widespread use due to resistance from officials. The 6.8 SPC was designed for better terminal effectiveness at the shorter ranges of urban combat experienced in Iraq. When fighting in Afghanistan began to intensify, engagements began taking place at greater distances, where the 6.8 SPC begins to falter. Experiments suggested that the comparatively short 6.8 mm bullets became ineffective at longer ranges. In 2007, both the U.S. SOCOM and the U.S. Marine Corps decided not to field weapons chambered in 6.8 mm due to logistical and cost issues.

While there are many rumors of evaluations of the cartridge by several major federal and local law enforcement agencies, the US Drug Enforcement Administration has allowed individual agents to purchase the M6A2 D-DEA – which uses the 6.8mm Remington SPC – as an authorized alternative to their duty weapon. In 2010 the Jordanian state-owned arms manufacturer KADDB announced that they would be producing 6.8 mm rifles and carbines for the Jordanian Army. There is also a contract between LWRC, Magpul, Alliant Techsystems and the Saudi Royal Guard for around 36,000 Six8 PDWs and an undisclosed amount of ATK/Federal XD68GD (90gr Gold Dot "training" ammo) and proprietary Magpul 6.8 Pmags specifically for the LWRC Six8.

==== Semiautomatic action ====
The first major manufacturer to offer a 6.8mm Remington SPC-chambered version of the AR-15 was Barrett Firearms Company, offering the Barrett M468 and later the REC7. By 2007, most major manufacturers of AR-15-type rifles for the civilian gun market were offering rifles in this caliber. Dedicated AR upper receiver assemblies chambered for the round are produced by a number of smaller firms, including Daniel Defense. Ruger Firearms no longer produces a 6.8 mm for their Ruger SR-556 piston-driven AR-15 variant. The Stag Arms hunter and tactical models utilize the newer chamber (SPC II) and specified twist rates to accommodate higher pressure loadings, as well as upper receivers in left-handed configurations. Rock River Arms has an LAR-6.8 X Series rifle and uppers. Microtech Small Arms Research offers their version of the Steyr AUG in 6.8. Robinson Armament Co. offers the XCR-L in 6.8, which can be easily converted between 6.8, 5.56, and 7.62×39. Bushmaster delivered a 6.8 SPC II conversion kit to the market as of October 2018. Ruger Firearms chambered their Mini-14 ranch rifle in this round for several years; however, it has been discontinued.

== See also ==
- .224 Valkyrie, 6.8 SPC derivative cartridges
- 6mm ARC
- 6mm SAW, similar cartridge developed to approximate both 7.62×51mm and 5.56×45mm cartridges
- .277 Fury
- .280 British, similar cartridge developed during the 1940s in the UK
- .276 Pedersen, similar cartridge developed in 1923 in the US
- .277 Wolverine, 6.8mm AR-15 wildcat based on 5.56×45mm case
- List of AR platform cartridges
- List of individual weapons of the U.S. Armed Forces
