= .460 Steyr =

Sniper rifle cartridge

- 3D Model of the .460 Steyr cartridge
- Type: Rifle
- Place of origin: Austria

Production history
- Designer: Horst Grillmayer
- Designed: 2002
- Manufacturer: Steyr Mannlicher
- Produced: 2004–present

Specifications
- Parent case: .50 BMG
- Case type: Rimless, bottleneck
- Bullet diameter: .4579 in (11.63 mm)
- Land diameter: .4500 in (11.43 mm)
- Neck diameter: 0.5008 in (12.72 mm)
- Shoulder diameter: 0.7205 in (18.30 mm)
- Base diameter: 0.804 in (20.4 mm)
- Rim diameter: 0.804 in (20.4 mm)
- Rim thickness: 0.083 in (2.1 mm)
- Case length: 3.543 in (90.0 mm)
- Overall length: 4.918 in (124.9 mm)
- Rifling twist: 1 in 14
- Maximum pressure (C.I.P): 53,664 psi (370.00 MPa)

Ballistic performance
| Bullet mass/type | Velocity | Energy |
|---|---|---|
| 600 gr (39 g) Monolithic | 3,000 ft/s (910 m/s) | 11,989 ft⋅lbf (16,255 J) |

The .460 Steyr (11.6×90mm Grillmayer) is a center fire cartridge from the weapons manufacturer Steyr Mannlicher, which was developed for sniper rifles. During the development, important features for the military, such as the penetration power of armor or a tracer, were not taken into account. The cartridge was presented for the first time in February 2004 at the ShotShow-2004 in Las Vegas together with the Steyr HS .50.

The cartridge was designed by Horst Grillmayer in 2002, while the projectile was designed by Guido Wasser. Production started around 2004 together with the Steyr HS .460.

The ammunition was developed for precision rifles for sport shooters, with the focus on the long range and bypassing the 12.7×99mm NATO (.50 BMG) caliber, the use of which is prohibited in many European countries for non-official purposes. The ammunition can also be of interest to armies deployed abroad, which have been banned from using 12.7 mm ammunition in peacekeeping operations.

== Overview ==
The external shape of the .460 Steyr cartridge is very similar to other cartridges such as 12.7x99mm, but has a shorter case and a narrower cartridge neck, which leads to increased gas pressure. The ballistic properties of the .460 Steyr and the 12.7x99mm are largely similar.

The ammunition is also comparable to other special cartridges such as the .408 Chey Tac or the .416 Barrett, which were also developed as special calibers for precision rifles in order to be able to work over long distances.

== See also ==
- List of rifle cartridges
- .50 BMG
- .416 Barrett
- .408 CheyTac
