= Mike Liles =

American businessman and politician (1945–2022)

Member of the Tennessee House of Representatives from the 49th district
- In office 1991–1995
- Preceded by: Fred R. Hobbs
- Succeeded by: Mary Ann Eckles

Personal details
- Born: September 19, 1945
- Died: May 1, 2022 (aged 76)
- Party: Republican

Mike J. Liles (September 19, 1945 – May 1, 2022) was an American businessman and politician. He served in the Tennessee House of Representatives from 1991 to 1995 and was a Republican.

Liles lived in Murfreesboro, Tennessee, with his wife and family and was a contractor. He also served on the Rutherford County Commission.
