= Remington Semi Automatic Sniper System =

Remington Semi Automatic Sniper System (RSASS)
- Type: Precision rifle Sniper Rifle
- Place of origin: United States

Service history
- In service: 2012–present

Production history
- Designed: 2010-present
- Manufacturer: Remington Arms

Specifications
- Mass: 15.75 lb (7.14 kg)
- Length: 39.5 in (100 cm)
- Barrel length: 18 in (46 cm); 20 in (51 cm)
- Cartridge: 7.62 NATO
- Barrels: 1:10 twist
- Effective firing range: 875–1,100 yd (800–1,006 m)
- Feed system: 20-round magazine

The Remington Semi Automatic Sniper System (RSASS) is a semi-automatic precision rifle manufactured by Remington Arms.

== Design and features ==
The RSASS was designed and sold by Remington with components made by JP Enterprises Company. The stated accuracy for the RSASS is Sub-MOA, with an effective range of up to 1,100 yd (1,000 m).

== Use ==
The primary market for the RSASS is law enforcement and military as a designated marksman/sniper rifle. As of January 2013, the rifle is only available for Military/LEOs and not for civilian sales.

== See also ==
- LWRC REPR
- Colt Canada C20 DMR
