= Barrett Model 98B =

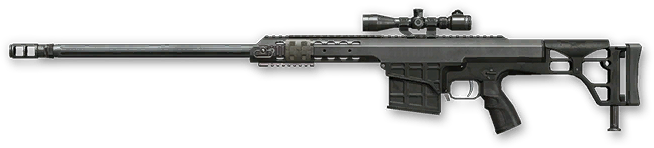
- Artistic rendition of the Barrett Model 98B
- Type: Sniper Rifle
- Place of origin: United States

Production history
- Designer: Ronnie Barrett
- Designed: 1997
- Manufacturer: Barrett Firearms Manufacturing
- Produced: 2008–present

Specifications
- Mass: 12.4 lb (5.6 kg) (20" Barrel); 13.5 lb (6.1 kg) (27" Barrel)
- Length: 43 in (110 cm) (20" Barrel); 49.75 in (126.4 cm) (27" Barrel)
- Barrel length: 20 in (51 cm); 27 in (69 cm)
- Cartridge: .338 Lapua Magnum
- Action: Bolt action
- Muzzle velocity: 3,100 ft/s (940 m/s)
- Maximum firing range: 1,500 metres (1,600 yd)
- Feed system: 10-round detachable box magazine

The Barrett Model 98B (also known as the Barrett Model 98 Bravo) is a bolt-action sniper rifle chambered in .338 Lapua Magnum (8.6×70mm or 8.58×70mm) and manufactured by Barrett Firearms Manufacturing. The Model 98B was officially announced in October 2008, and became available for sale in early 2009, with an MSRP of $4,495.00.

Sub-MOA shot groupings of 0.73 inches (19 mm) at 100 yards (91 m), 1.3 inches (33 mm) at 200 yards (180 m), and 4.05 inches (103 mm) at 800 yards (730 m) were obtained.

== Overview ==
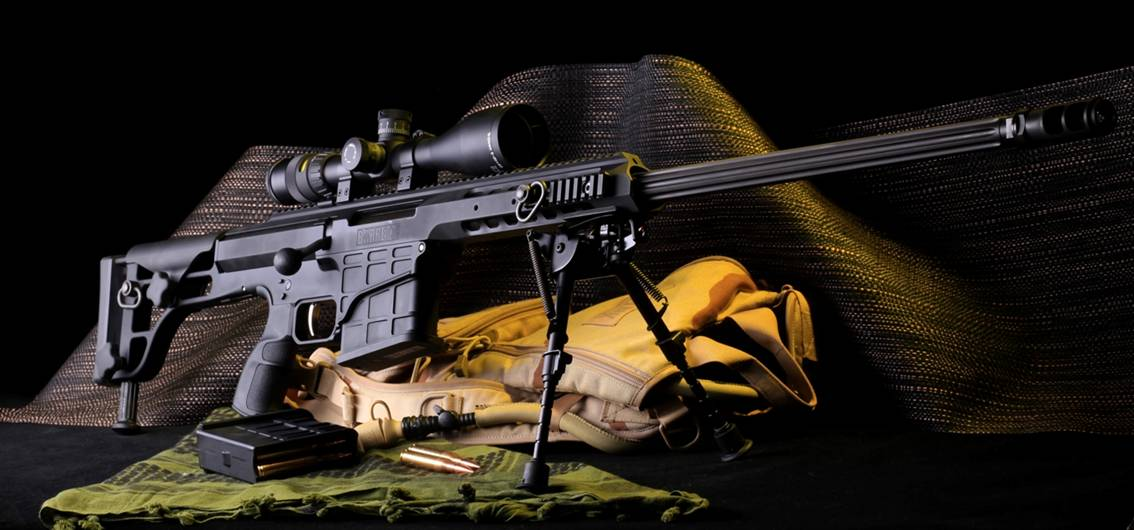
The Barrett M98B

Barrett engineers began designing the Model 98B in 1997, with a goal of developing a precision tactical .338 Lapua rifle not based on any sporting rifles. The initial semi-auto design, the Model 98 was unveiled at the 1998 SHOT Show, but never went into full production. In past years, Ronnie Barrett's son, Chris, revived the company's interest in the .338 rifle.

Many of the Model 98B's features are inspired by Stoner's AR-15/M16; the hinged aluminum upper and lower receivers, ergonomic pistol grip and thumb operated safety are all borrowed from Stoner's design. The upper receiver also features a full-length (18.125 inches (460.4 mm)) 1913 style Picatinny rail for mounting optics, lasers, etc., and two additional accessory rails are mounted forward of the main rail on each side of the upper.

The Model 98B also features a fluted medium-heavy 27-inch (690 mm) barrel made of 4150 MIL-B-11595 steel. The barrel is rifled in a six groove, 1:10" right hand twist pattern, and features a two-port muzzle brake threaded on and indexed by a jam nut. The bolt rides in a new "bolt guide" design, consisting of two tubular glass-filled polymer guides which have been infused with Teflon. These guides allow the bolt to travel better, as well as reducing the need for lubrication, and helping to seal the ejection and bolt handle ports from dirt. The bolt head is made of case-hardened 8620 steel, features nine lugs (three sets of three), and is attached to the bolt body with a crosspin. This separate bolt head design allows for simple caliber changes, as well as future pre-headspaced barrel and bolt-head sets.

The lower receiver is forged from 7075 aluminum, can mount any type of AR-15/M-16 pistol grip, and features an ambidextrous magazine latch just forward of the integral trigger guard. Also featured within the lower receiver is the rifle's trigger assembly. The trigger assembly can be removed from the receiver as a single unit, and features adjustment screws for weight (2 to 4 lbs.) and overtravel, as well as a reversible AR-15/M-16 style thumb safety.

The skeletonized buttstock is also integral to the lower receiver, and features a thick Sorbothane buttpad with spacers for pull adjustment, a polymer cheekpiece with 0.75 inches (19 mm) of variable comb height, and an adjustable monopod. The rifle also comes from the factory with a Harris brand S-BR bipod attached to the fore-end.

The Model 98B was featured both on the cover, and in an article, of the April 2009 issue of American Rifleman magazine.

== MRAD ==
Barrett's offering for USSOCOM's Precision Sniper Rifle contract, the MRAD, is derived from the Model 98B. Changes to the rifle include cutting back the fixed stock and integrating a folding adjustable stock, a Desert Tan finish color, and a front loading quick change barrel for caliber change. As of 2011, the only barrel and caliber offered was a 24.5 in (620 mm) fluted barrel with a 1:10" right hand twist chambered for .338 Lapua Magnum.

== Safety recall ==
On September 9, 2009, Barrett released a recall notice regarding the Model 98B. They determined that if the rifle is dropped or subjected to a significant impact, it could accidentally discharge. A modification to the lower receiver was required to ensure user safety.

== See also ==
- Accuracy International AWM
- C14 Timberwolf
- Sako TRG
