= .416 Barrett =

Rifle cartridge

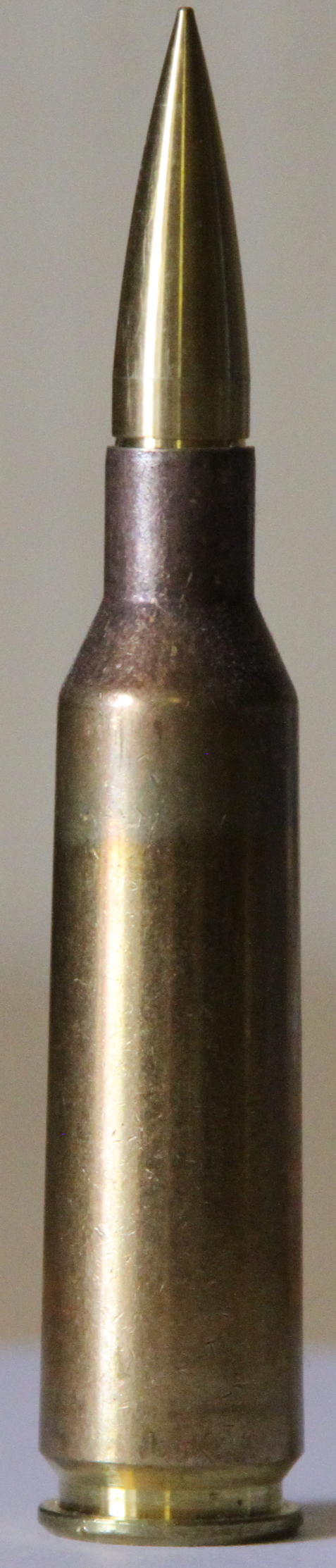
- Type: Rifle
- Place of origin: United States

Production history
- Designer: Chris Barrett and Pete Forras
- Designed: 2005

Specifications
- Parent case: .50 BMG
- Case type: Rimless, bottlenecked
- Bullet diameter: .416 in (10.6 mm)
- Land diameter: .408 in (10.4 mm)
- Neck diameter: .458 in (11.6 mm)
- Shoulder diameter: .730 in (18.5 mm)
- Base diameter: .803 in (20.4 mm)
- Rim diameter: .804 in (20.4 mm)
- Rim thickness: .083 in (2.1 mm)
- Case length: 3.27 in (83 mm)
- Overall length: 4.65 in (118 mm)
- Case capacity: 200 gr H_{2}O (13 cm^{3})

Ballistic performance
Bullet mass/type	Velocity	Energy
398 gr (26 g) Solid Brass	3,150 ft/s (960 m/s)	8,767.4 ft⋅lbf (11,887.0 J)

The .416 Barrett (10.4×83mm), centerfire rifle cartridge is a proprietary bottlenecked centrefire rifle cartridge designed in 2005. It is an alternative to the large-caliber .50 BMG in long-range high-power rifles. It was designed in response to a request for a medium/heavy rifle cartridge combination that was issued from Naval Surface Warfare Center Crane Division in late 2004.

== Design ==
The Barrett .416 cartridge was designed by Chris Barrett, son of Ronnie Barrett, with the help of Pete Forras. The bullet was designed using some NACA low-supersonic-drag equations to design the shape.

The cartridge was designed as an improvement to the .50 BMG cartridge, a common machine gun and rifle cartridge. It is a wildcatted .50 BMG case, shortened to 3.27 inches (83 mm) from its original length of 3.91 inches (99 mm) and necked down to accept a .416 caliber, 398-grain (25.8 g) projectile; however, the case dimensions are proprietary. Because the two cartridges, the .50 BMG and .416 Barrett, have identical base dimensions, all that is needed to convert a rifle to use one or the other cartridge is a relatively quick barrel swap.

The Barrett Model 99 was initially the only commercially available rifle using the cartridge. In 2009, Zel Custom Manufacturing released the Tactilite .416 Barrett upper for AR-style rifles Zel Custom Manufacturing curtailed operations in 2018 which was subsumed by another manufacturer, McCutchen Firearms, after the BATFE classified barreled upper assemblies in .50 caliber to be firearms in and of themselves on July 17, 2018. There is now a range of options available from several manufacturers: Noreen Firearms makes a rifle in .416 Barrett, as does Desert Tech, and Barrett now also has a .416 Barrett option for its semi-automatic M82A1. Barrett has also introduced the MRADELR rifle in .416 Barrett.

=== 416 Barrett competition rifles ===
Today, many competition-driven shooters build custom 416 Barrett rifles with longer barrels ranging from 35-40" to make the most of the 180 grain+ of powder loaded in this cartridge pushing 550 grain solid bullets past 2900 ft/s, significantly higher than the original loading.

This has made the rifle very popular in Extreme Long Range Matches where steel targets are engaged out past 2 miles with specialized optics such as the March Genesis ELR Scope, allowing these rifle systems to deliver accurate precision rifle fire to impressive ranges. This is further facilitated by the weight of these extreme long range rifles often hovering around 18 kg all in.

== Performance ==
=== Barrett 398 gr solid brass boattail spitzer bullet ===
The use of a lighter, narrower bullet results in a significantly higher muzzle velocity and superior ballistic performance to the .50 BMG, and the .416 Barrett is claimed to retain more energy than the .50 BMG at distances over 1,000 yards. Barrett claims that this cartridge is capable of propelling a 398 gr solid brass boattail spitzer bullet out of the 32-inch (810 mm) barrel of a Model 99 single-shot rifle at 960 m/s (3,150 ft/s), giving it a ballistic coefficient of .720, and keeping the projectile supersonic out to 1,737 meters (1,900 yards, ~1.2 miles).

=== .416 Barrett MSG bullet ===
Improvement beyond this standard while still using standard .416 Barrett brass seems possible, but the bullets have to be specially designed. An example of such a special .416 Barrett very low drag extreme range bullet is the German CNC manufactured mono-metal 27.5 gram (424 gr) .416 Barrett MSG (G1 BC ≈ 1.103 – this ballistic coefficient (BC) is calculated by its designer, Mr. Lutz Möller, and not proven by Doppler radar measurements). The solid brass .416 Barrett MSG bullet has an overall length of 56 mm (2.2 in) and derives its exceptional low drag from a radical LD Haack or Sears-Haack profile in the bullet's nose area. Rifles chambered for this cartridge bullet combination, with a cartridge overall length of 116 mm (4.6 in), have to be equipped with custom made 1,016 mm (40.0 in) long 279 mm (1:11 in) twist rate barrels to stabilize the .416 Barrett MSG projectiles and attain a projected 1,032 m/s (3,385 ft/s) muzzle velocity.

=== Muzzle velocity ===
.416 Barrett ballistic comparison with other long-range sniper cartridges
Cartridge	Bullet weight gr (g)	Muzzle velocity ft/s (m/s)	Muzzle energy ft·lbf (J)
.338 Lapua Magnum	250 (16.2)	2,970 (905.2)	4,893 (6,634.0)
.338 Lapua Magnum	300 (19.44)	2,717 (828.1)	4,919 (6,669.2)
.375 Chey Tac	375 (24.3)	3,050 (929.6)	7,744 (10,500)
.408 Chey Tac	305 (19.8)	3,500 (1,066.8)	8,298 (11,250.5)
.408 Chey Tac	419 (27.2)	3,000 (914.4)	8,376 (11,356.3)
.416 Barrett	398 (25.8)	3,150 (960.1)	8,767 (11,887.0)
.50 BMG	700 (45)	2,978 (907.7)	13,971 (18,942.1)

== Legality ==
A few jurisdictions in the United States, most notably California, New Jersey, as well as a few nations such as Argentina, Austria, Belgium, Italy, Lithuania, Netherlands, and Denmark restrict or prohibit civilian ownership of rifles chambered to use the .50 BMG cartridge, but not other calibers (e.g., .416 Barrett).

For California, Section 30905 of the California Penal Code governs exceptions/exclusions to the law:

You hold a valid permit to possess an assault weapon specifically (not just a general concealed carry permit),

You lawfully possessed the rifle before it was made illegal (i.e., before January 1, 2005), You are the executor or administrator of an estate that lawfully holds such firearms, You engage in lawful target shooting and/or police-approved firearm exhibitions, or

You are a non-California resident traveling who is traveling to or from an organized competitive match or league competition that lawfully uses assault weapons.

== Gallery ==
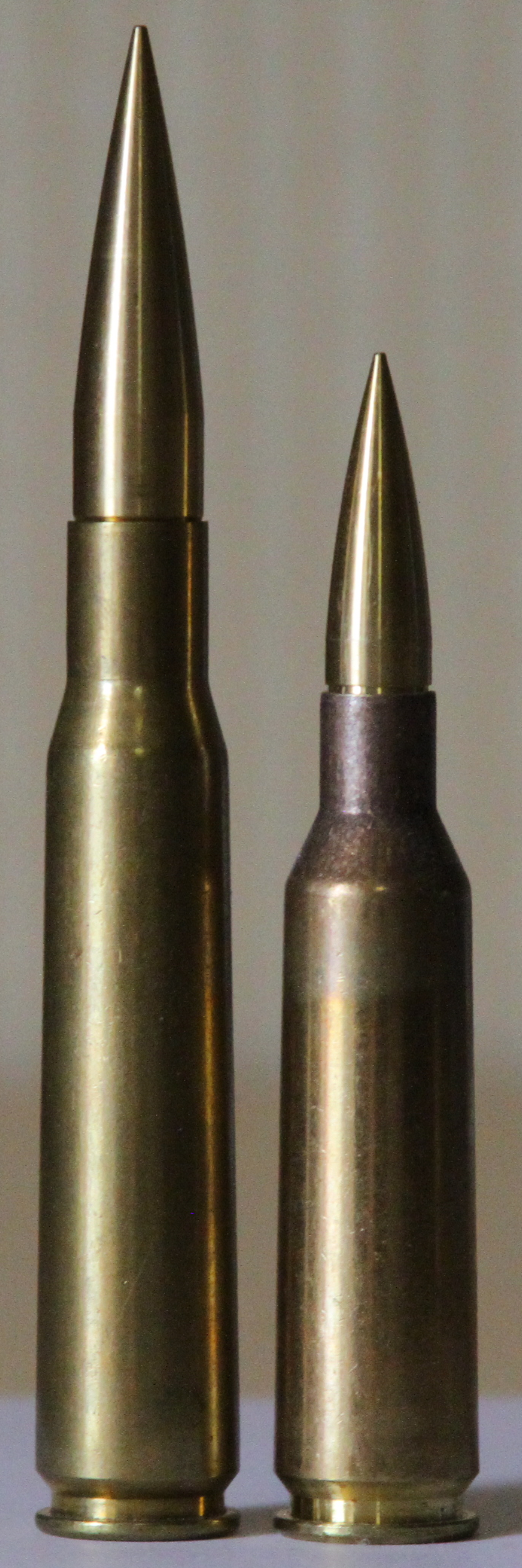
.50 BMG cartridge on the left and a .416 cartridge on the right.

== See also ==
- .408 CheyTac
- List of firearms
- List of rifle cartridges
- List of wildcat cartridges
- Table of handgun and rifle cartridges
- 10 mm caliber
- .50 Caliber BMG Regulation Act of 2004
