= Tim Rudd =

American politician (born 1960)

Member of the Tennessee House of Representatives from the 34th district
- Incumbent
- Assumed office January 10, 2017
- Preceded by: Rick Womick

Personal details
- Born: November 30, 1960 (age 65)
- Party: Republican
- Education: Middle Tennessee State University
- Website: House website Campaign website

Tim Rudd (born November 30, 1960) is an American politician and a member of the Republican Party. He was elected to the Tennessee House of Representatives in 2016, representing the 34th district.

In 2023, Rudd supported a resolution to expel three Democratic lawmakers from the legislature for violating decorum rules. The expulsion was widely characterized as unprecedented.

== 2018 House election ==
The results for the 34th House district election were:

District 34 General Election Results
Party	Candidate	Vote Count	Vote %
Republican	Tim Rudd	19,962	66.76%
Democrat	Laura Bohling	9,939	33.24%
Total		29,901	100%

== Early life and pre-politics career ==
Tim Rudd attended Smyrna High School and Middle Tennessee State University. Rudd worked in the real estate business with Coldwell Banker Snow & Law beginning in 1998. Rudd has lived in Rutherford County, Tennessee for 45 years.

== Religious freedom controversy ==
Rudd was the sponsor of HB-0836. The measure permits adoption and foster care agencies funded by taxpayers to refuse service to LGBT people based upon "religious beliefs or moral convictions."

== Committees ==
Rudd was a member of the Insurance and Banking and State Government Committees and the Insurance and Banking Subcommittee.

He is a member of the Insurance and Local Committees and the Property and Casualty Subcommittee. He chairs the Elections and Campaign Finance Subcommittee.

== Legislative initiatives ==
Rudd has advocated for bills such as; the protection of the unborn, retaining traditional gender labels, better supervising child sexual predators, freedom of speech through signs on personal property, protection of the Second Amendment, National Guard education financial assistance, Middle College scholarships, reducing the size of government, worker's compensation reform and educator assistance bills.

On June 9, 2020, Rudd voted as a member of the House Naming, Designating, & Private Acts Committee against removal of a bust honoring Ku Klux Klan Grand Wizard Nathan Bedford Forrest from the Tennessee State Capitol building.

== Beliefs and values ==
Rudd is a Baptist. He is a conservative. Rudd supports the rights of the unborn and is an opponent of abortion for any reason. He opposes same-sex marriage, claiming that traditional marriage forms the backbone for families, making stable society.
