= Mike Sparks =

American politician (born 1967)

Member of the Tennessee House of Representatives from the 49th district
- Incumbent
- Assumed office January 11, 2011
- Preceded by: Kent Coleman

Personal details
- Born: January 11, 1967 (age 59)
- Party: Republican
- Spouse: Felicia Sparks (m. 1990)
- Children: 2
- Education: Middle Tennessee State University
- Website: votemikesparks.com

Mike Sparks (born January 11, 1967) is an American politician. A Republican, he represents the 49th district in the Tennessee House of Representatives.

== Career ==
Sparks was a county commissioner for Rutherford County, Tennessee from 2002 until 2010, and served on the Smyrna Municipal Planning Committee from 2001 to 2010.

His former auto business, MidTnAUTOS.com, was reported by the Business Journal to be the first 'dot com' car business in Tennessee to use a domain name as its official company name.

Sparks has self-published three books: Learn The Car Business for Fun & Profit, Learn to Barter & 21 Ways to Increase Your Income and How to Do More with Less During Tough Times.

Prompted, in part, by the Rutherford County, Tennessee juvenile arrest and incarceration scandal, in January 2023, he introduced House Bill 720 to the Tennessee General Assembly, proposing amendments to protect juveniles from interrogation in the absence of a guardian.
