= LWRC SABR =

LWRC International semi-automatic 308 caliber rifle

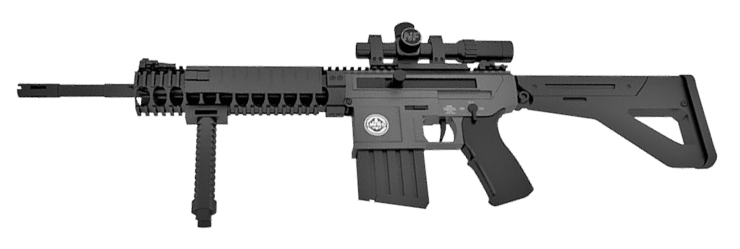
- LWRC SABR
- Type: Semi-automatic sniper rifle
- Place of origin: United States

Production history
- Designed: 2008
- Manufacturer: LWRC International

Specifications
- Mass: 8.2 lb (3.7 kg)
- Length: 39.3 in (100 cm)
- Cartridge: 7.62x51mm NATO
- Barrels: 12.7", 16.1", 18" and 20”
- Action: Short stroke gas piston operated
- Sights: Skirmish and Back Up Iron Sights

LWRC SABR (Sniper Assaulter Battle Rifle) is a 7.62x51mm semi-automatic rifle manufactured by LWRC International. The gun is considered a sniper rifle and it preceded the LWRC REPR.

== Design details ==
The gun features the LWRC designed short-stroke gas-piston operating system. It has removable Picatinny rails and it could accommodate the installation of several other uppers with different barrel lengths, including 12.7", 16.1", 18" and 20".

== Operation ==
There is a side charging handle so that the user does not have to take their eyes off of the target. The rifle was the first sniper rifle that was produced by LWRCI. It was replaced by the LWRC REPR. The SABR was heavier than the REPR.

The gun is one of the many that is banned in Canada.
