= Barrett Firearms Manufacturing =

Australian/American firearms manufacturer

- Type: Private
- Industry: Firearms
- Founded: 1982; 44 years ago
- Founder: Ronnie Barrett
- Headquarters: Christiana, Tennessee, U.S.
- Key people: Bryan James (President)
- Products: Firearms
- Owner: NIOA
- Website: barrett.net

Barrett Firearms Manufacturing is an Australian-owned, American manufacturer of firearms and ammunition located in Christiana, Tennessee. It was founded in 1982 by Ronnie G. Barrett for the purpose of building semi-automatic rifles chambered for the .50 BMG (12.7×99mm NATO) ammunition, originally developed for and used in M2 Browning machine guns. Barrett began this work in the early 1980s, and the first working rifles were available in 1982, hence the designation M82. Barrett personally designed every part of the weapon. He marketed the weapon and mass-produced it utilizing private funds. He continued to develop the rifle through the 1980s, and developed the improved M82A1 rifle by 1986. Barrett was acquired by the NIOA Group on 17 January 2023, solidifying the long-standing relationship between the two companies.

== History ==
Barrett introduced the M82 in 1982 but did not have significant sales until 1989. These first large sales were to Sweden. Soon afterward, the M82 was purchased by the United States Armed Forces, and it was deployed in the Gulf War. The company has since gained contracts with dozens of countries to supply sniper rifles.

The success of the M82A1 led the company to develop several other models of .50 BMG rifles, including the M95, M99, and M99-1. These are lighter and lower cost bolt-action and single-shot rifles.

An early customer of the M82 (or "Barrett Light Fifty") was the IRA, which conducted a sniper campaign against the British Armed Forces in Northern Ireland in the 1990s. An unidentified IRA volunteer, quoted by author Toby Harnden, said that:

What's special about the Barrett is the huge kinetic energy... The bullet can just walk through a flak jacket. South Armagh was the prime place to use such weapon because of the availability of Brits. They came to dread it and that was part of its effectiveness.

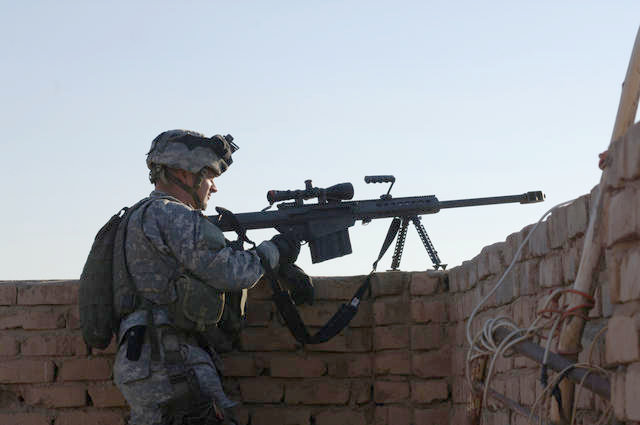
A U.S. Army sniper with a Barrett rifle in Baghdad, Iraq

The US military uses the M82A3 and a newer version, the M107, as an anti-materiel rifle. It is used by explosive ordnance disposal teams with special military HEIAP ammunition.

Barrett also manufactured the REC7 upper receiver for the AR-15 style rifle, chambered in 6.8 mm Remington SPC, which was one of the weapons the US Army reviewed in 2008 while drafting requirements for a potential M4 carbine replacement.

In response to California's ban of civilian ownership of .50 BMG rifles, Barrett suspended sales and service to all law enforcement agencies in California. In October 2008, Barrett introduced the new M98B. The M98B was a bolt-action rifle chambered in .338 Lapua Magnum, which went on sale in 2009. On February 26, 2016, Tennessee named the Barrett M82 the official rifle of the State of Tennessee.

In 2021, Barrett secured a $50 million contract for the United States Army Precision Sniper Rifle initiative.

In January 2023, Barrett was acquired by Australian defense contractor NIOA. Long-serving Barrett Chief Operating Officer Bryan James became president. Barrett founder Ronnie Barrett said: "Today marks the beginning of a new chapter in the Barrett story. Rob and the NIOA team have great respect for the legacy Barrett has created as the leader in long range precision rifles. It's reassuring to know Barrett will be in good hands with a family-owned company that is focused on manufacturing and delivering world-class firearms and munitions to a global network."

== Products ==
- Anti-materiel rifles
  - Barrett M82/M107
  - Barrett M90
  - Barrett M95
  - Barrett M99
  - Barrett XM109
  - Barrett XM500
- Sniper rifles
  - Barrett M98B
  - Barrett MRAD
  - Barrett MRADELR
- Semi-automatic rifles
  - Barrett M468
  - Barrett REC7
  - Barrett REC10
- Machine guns
  - Barrett M240LW
- Optics
  - Barrett Optical Ranging System (BORS)
- Ammunition
  - .50 BMG M33 Ball
  - .416 Barrett
  - 6.8 SPC
  - .338 Lapua Magnum

== See also ==
- List of anti-materiel rifles
