= .510 DTC EUROP =

Rifle cartridge in France

- Type: Rifle
- Place of origin: France

Production history
- Designer: Eric Danis
- Designed: 2000

Specifications
- Parent case: .50 BMG
- Bullet diameter: 12.98 mm (0.511 in)
- Neck diameter: 14.22 mm (0.560 in)
- Shoulder diameter: 19.28 mm (0.759 in)
- Base diameter: 20.38 mm (0.802 in)
- Rim diameter: 20.42 mm (0.804 in)
- Rim thickness: 2.26 mm (0.089 in)
- Case length: 96.14 mm (3.785 in)
- Overall length: 137.47 mm (5.412 in)
- Case capacity: 19.175 cm^{3} (295.92 gr H_{2}O)
- Primer type: CCI#35 (.50 BMG)

Ballistic performance
Bullet mass/type	Velocity	Energy
41.9 g (647 gr)	910 m/s (3,000 ft/s)	17,306 J (12,764 ft⋅lbf)

The .510 DTC EUROP is a French rifle cartridge developed by Eric Danis of Dan Tec to comply with firearms legislation of .50 BMG rifles in Europe. The .510 DTC EUROP uses the same bullet as the .50 BMG, but has slightly different case dimensions. The case is 0.100 inches (2.5 mm) shorter and uses a steeper shoulder than standard .50 BMG ammunition. .510 DTC cases can be made by shortening and then fire-forming .50 BMG cases. The new round has almost identical ballistics, but because of the different dimensions, rifles chambered for the .50 BMG cannot safely fire the .510 DTC, and vice versa, and therefore do not fall under the same legal prohibitions such as California's .50 Caliber BMG Regulation Act of 2004.
