= Rick Womick =

American politician

Member of the Tennessee House of Representatives from the 34th district
- In office January 11, 2011 – January 10, 2017
- Preceded by: Donna Rowland
- Succeeded by: Tim Rudd

Personal details
- Born: July 10, 1958 (age 68) Dallas, Texas, USA
- Party: Republican
- Spouse: Married
- Children: 4
- Education: University of Dayton (BS)
- Website: House website

Rick Womick (born 1958) is an American politician. He served as a Republican member of the Tennessee House of Representatives for the 34th district from 2011 through 2017.

== Early life ==
He was born on July 10, 1958, in Dallas, Texas. He received a Bachelor of Science in Education from the University of Dayton and received training at the Federal Law Enforcement Training Center.

== Career ==
He worked as an airline pilot and United States Air Force fighter pilot for twenty-three years.

He is chairman of the Rutherford County Republican Party. Since 2010, he has served as state congressman for the 34th district of Tennessee. He is Vice-Chair of the House Civil Justice Committee, and a member of the House Consumer and Human Resources Committee and the House Civil Justice Subcommittee. He has made anti-Muslim remarks, suggesting all Muslims serving in the United States Army should be removed.

In November 2014, Womick introduced HB002, a bill that would require abortion providers to show a woman an ultrasound image of her fetus. If the woman declines to do so, the provider would be required to verbally describe the fetus, let the woman hear the heartbeat and provide the woman with an image of the ultrasound. The bill would also require a waiting period of at least 24 hours before getting the abortion. According to Womick, the bill is "about protecting the emotional and physical health of a woman."

In 2015, he sent a letter to county clerks in Tennessee asking them to ignore the United States Supreme Court's ruling in favour of same-sex marriage.

He is involved with the Boy Scouts of America, where he is an Eagle Scout. He is also a member of the Rutherford County Chamber of Commerce, the National Rifle Association of America, the Air Force Association, the Allied Pilots Association, Focus on the Family, the Tennessee Right to Life, the Tennessee Eagle Forum, and the World Taekwondo Federation.

Womick is a lieutenant colonel in the Tennessee State Guard.

== Personal life ==
He is married, and he has four children. He is a Baptist and attends New Vision Baptist Church in Murfreesboro, Tennessee.
