= .50 Caliber BMG Regulation Act of 2004 =

Gun law in California, United States

California State Legislature
- Long title: An act to amend Sections 245, 12011, 12022, 12022.5, 12275, 12275.5, 12280, 12285, 12286, 12287, 12288, 12288.5, 12289, and 12290 of, and to add Section 12278 to, the Penal Code, relating to firearms.
- Enacted by: California State Legislature
- Enacted: June 4, 2004 (Assembly); August 23, 2004 (Senate, amended); August 25, 2004 (Senate, concurrence)
- Signed: September 13, 2004
- Introduced by: Paul Koretz (D-42nd-Los Angeles)

The .50 Caliber BMG Regulation Act of 2004 is a law in the state of California that effectively banned all .50 BMG-caliber rifles from being sold in the state. The law took effect on January 1, 2005.

== Background ==
The legislature of California declared that "proliferation and use" of .50 BMG rifles posed a terrorist threat, as well as a threat to the "health, safety, and security of all residents" of California. The act required existing .50 BMG rifles to be registered with the state and prohibited the sale of any rifle after the ban went into effect. To quote the state web site, the act "regulates the .50 BMG rifles in essentially the same manner as assault weapons." The law specifically allowed a registration period of one year, now passed, to register any such firearms, after which unregistered weapons would become illegal firearms.

=== Definitions ===
"A .50 BMG rifle is defined as a centerfire rifle that can fire a .50 BMG cartridge and is not already an assault weapon ... or a machinegun"

".50 BMG cartridge" is defined as a cartridge that is designed and intended to be fired from a centerfire rifle and that meets all of the following criteria: (1) It has an overall length of 5.54 inches (141 mm) from the base to the tip of the bullet. (2) The bullet diameter for the cartridge is from .510 to, and including, .511-inch (13.0 mm). (3) The case base diameter for the cartridge is from .800-inch (20.3 mm) to, and including, .804 inch. (4) The cartridge case length is 3.91 inches (99 mm). (PC § 12278.)

=== Exceptions/Exclusions to California Penal Code 30905, et al. ===
The law does not apply to the law enforcement officers with permission from their employing agencies.

Exceptions are granted to rifles classified as antiques or Curio and Relics as defined by the BATFE.

Out-of-state owners may bring .50 BMG rifles into the state for shooting competitions.

Limited exceptions are granted for exhibitions, displays, and education projects sponsored by law enforcement or government agencies.

You hold a valid permit to possess an assault weapon specifically (not just a general concealed carry permit) from the State Department of Justice.

You lawfully possessed the rifle before it was made illegal (i.e., before January 1, 2005) and registered it before April 30, 2006 with the State Department of Justice.

You are the executor or administrator of an estate that lawfully holds such firearms.

== Controversy ==
As a result of the ban, the Barrett Firearms Company announced it would no longer sell to or service any of its rifles in the possession of any California government agency.

A 1999 Justice Department Office of Special Investigations briefing on .50 caliber rifle crime identified several instances of the .50 BMG being involved in criminal activities. Only one instance (the Branch Davidians at Waco, Texas) involved the alleged use of a .50 BMG during the commission of a crime; the remainder involved illegal possession (e.g. stolen), not use. The briefing did not identify any instance of a .50 BMG rifle being used in the commission of a murder.

According to the GAO report there were no instances of violent crime with a .50 BMG rifle, while providing examples of crimes that had occurred: a doomsday cult possessed 10 rifles and were arrested for using false identities, a .50 BMG rifle was stolen and later recovered, and a claim by the ATF that the Branch Davidians fired a .50 BMG prior to the ATF firing tear gas and incendiary devices at the occupied structure. No .50 BMG rifles were reported recovered after the ATF siege at Waco

== Alternative cartridges ==
The .510 DTC Europ has since been introduced to take advantage of the highly specific language used in the act. The round provides almost identical ballistics and performance, but cannot be used in weapons chambered for .50 BMG.

Barrett has since produced the .416 Barrett, a necked-down .50 BMG case using a .416 caliber bullet, which is not subject to the .50 BMG Act because of the smaller caliber. It has the benefit of having a flatter trajectory and longer effective range than the .50 BMG.

== See also ==
- 12 mm caliber
