= Mary Ann Eckles =

American politician

Member of the Tennessee House of Representatives from the 49th district
- In office January 10, 1995 – January 9, 2001
- Preceded by: Mike Liles
- Succeeded by: Donna Rowland

Personal details
- Born: July 22, 1947 (age 79)
- Party: Democratic
- Spouse: George Eckles
- Children: 2
- Website: House website

Mary Ann Eckles (born July 22, 1947) was an American politician.

Eckles lived in Murfreesboro, Tennessee with her husband and family. She served in the Tennessee House of Representatives from 1995 to 2001 and was a Democrat.
