= Barrett M468 =

Assault rifle manufactured by Barrett Firearms Manufacturing

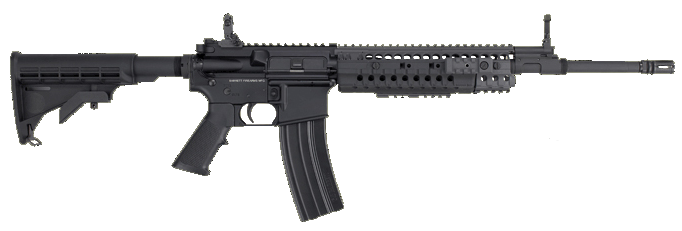
- Type: Assault rifle Carbine
- Place of origin: United States

Production history
- Manufacturer: Barrett Firearms Manufacturing
- Unit cost: $2,700 (full weapon) $1,590 (Upper Receiver Kit)
- Produced: 2004–2010

Specifications
- Mass: 7.3 lb (3.3 kg) (M468); 7.8 lb (3.5 kg) (M468A1)
- Length: 35.375 in (89.85 cm)
- Barrel length: 16 in (41 cm)
- Cartridge: 6.8 SPC
- Caliber: 6.8x43mm SPC
- Barrels: Chromed bore. 6 groove, Right Hand twist, 1-in-10” [1:25.4 cm]
- Action: Gas-operated, closed rotating bolt, Stoner bolt and carrier piston
- Rate of fire: 45 rpm (Semi-Auto); 750 rpm (Cyclic)
- Muzzle velocity: 2,650 ft/s (810 m/s)
- Effective firing range: 600 meters [656.1 yards] [600 m] (Individual Target); 800 meters [874.8 yards] (Area Targets)
- Feed system: 28-round magazine 5-, 10-, 25- or 30-round aftermarket magazines
- Sights: Folding front & rear

The Barrett M468 was a variant of the M4 Carbine manufactured by Barrett Firearms Manufacturing, rechambered for a heavier and larger 6.8mm bullet for increased terminal performance. The designation of M468 stands for an M4 carbine chambered for the 6.8mm SPC cartridge. It was an attempt to create an optimal Special Operations close-to-medium range carbine for Close Quarter Battle (CQB). A 12-inch barreled micro-carbine and 16-inch barreled carbine version were created. Barrett ceased manufacturing the rifle in 2010.

== Accessories ==
=== Furniture ===
The standard M468 uses a regular forend whereas the M468A1 comes with an ARMS Selective Integrated Rail (SIR) accessory rail system with integral "flat-top" Picatinny Rail scope mount and 4-position forend, and a detachable ARMS Back Up Iron Sight folding rear iron sight. The Barrett gas block in front has an integral forward-folding iron front sight. The rifle can use either a solid M16A2-style stock or an optional M4-style 4-position collapsible stock and used an M16A2-style pistol grip.

=== Muzzle brake ===
The original muzzle brake was a proprietary design with four vents (two on each side) for increased control. This was later replaced with an M16A2-style "birdcage" muzzle-brake on the later Barrett REC-7. This was so the REC-7 would use parts already in the supply chain and have compatibility with US- and NATO-standard rifle grenades and silencers.

=== Suppressor ===
A proprietary Barrett-made silencer was available that was optimized for use with the 12-inch (300 mm) barreled version. The suppressor weighed 1 pound (450 g) and was 12 inches (300 mm) long. The Barrett gas block contained a ratchet that steadied the suppressor while it was mounted. The suppressor screwed on clockwise and unscrewed counter-clockwise.

=== Magazines ===
The M468 could not use the same magazines as the AR-15/M16 family, so they designed their own. The Barrett magazine was made of steel rather than aluminum and had a steel follower rather than an aluminum or plastic one. The magazine used two magazine springs instead of one to maintain steady pressure and reliable feeding. The original 28-round magazine was designed to be the same dimensions and use the same web gear as the 30-round AR-15/M16 magazines. The larger 30-round Barrett steel magazines were one inch (25 mm) longer and weighed 5 oz (140 g) more empty / 1.82 lb (830 g) full) than the standard AR-15/M16 aluminum magazine. Precision Reflex Inc. (PRI) made a 25-round steel magazine that was 7.2 in (180 mm) long and weighed 8.4 oz (240 g) empty and 25 oz (710 g) loaded.

== Civilian market ==
The civilian-market version of the M468 shipped with a soft carrying case, cleaning kit, sight wrench, and two 25-round PRI magazines.

== Discontinuation ==
The M468 employed the same Stoner bolt and carrier piston system as the M4. The weakness of such a system is that it distributes hot gases and unburnt propellant directly into the rifle’s receiver, leading to overheating and potential stoppages if regular maintenance and cleaning protocols are overlooked. The cartridge was more powerful than the 5.56mm NATO, exacerbating this problem. This made the M468 less reliable than the M4 carbine it was trying to replace. Barrett was still selling its limited stock of the M468 but only as an upper receiver kit and not as a complete rifle up until 2010.

The M468 has been largely replaced by its upgraded version, the Barrett REC7, which operates via a short stroke piston that minimizes the direct impingement rifle's issues with gases in the receiver. The 5.56mm NATO version of the REC-7 was submitted for the Enhanced Carbine trials for use by conventional forces in 2008.
