= Fred R. Hobbs =

American businessman and farmer

Fred Ralston Hobbs (May 10, 1947 – June 24, 2010) was an American businessman and farmer.

Hobbs was born in Warren County, Tennessee and he moved to Eagleville, Tennessee, with his mother in 1949 after the death of his father. He was a cattle farmer, realtor, and auctioneer. Hobbs served as Mayor of Eagleville and also served on the Rutherford County Board of Education. He served in the Tennessee House of Representatives and was a Democrat.
