= LWRC International =

American manufacturer of firearms

LWRC International LLC
- Industry: Firearms
- Predecessor: Land Warfare Resources Corporation
- Founded: 1999; 27 years ago
- Headquarters: Cambridge, Maryland, United States
- Key people: Pat Bryan
- Products: Long guns; Handguns; Rifles
- Owner: Richard Bernstein
- Website: LWRCI

LWRC International, LLC, formerly known as Land Warfare Resources Corporation, is a CAGE defense contractor and firearms manufacturer. Founded in 1999, it is headquartered in Cambridge, Maryland.

== History ==
The company began in 1999, and was originally located in northern Virginia. The company was focused on R&D. Leitner-Wise Rifle Company, the predecessor to LWRC International, was founded in October 1999 by Paul Leitner-Wise in Springfield, Virginia, as a research and development firm dedicated to innovative firearms technologies, particularly short-stroke gas piston operating systems for AR-platform rifles.[3][4] The initial focus was on developing reliable, large-bore weapons to address limitations in direct impingement designs, emphasizing enhanced durability and reduced fouling through piston-driven mechanisms.[4] Early prototypes centered on adapting short-stroke tappet systems, drawing from prior military conversions like the 1960s Winchester M16 modifications.[5] Operations in the company's formative years involved prototyping and testing piston-operated carbines, culminating in the introduction of the M6 model around 2006, which featured a proprietary gas piston system in 5.56mm NATO caliber.[4] Based in northern Virginia, the firm prioritized engineering advancements over mass production, targeting military and law enforcement applications with modular, high-performance rifles.[6] Leitner-Wise, the inventor of key patents for the piston system, led development until his departure in October 2006 following an earlier company sale in 2005.[7][3]

In 2008, the company was acquired, relocated to Cambridge, Maryland, and rebranded as LWRC International, LLC, marking the transition to broader commercialization while retaining the core piston technology innovations from its origins.[3] This rebranding enabled expanded manufacturing capabilities and product lines, building on the foundational R&D established in the prior decade.[8]In 2006, the company purchased Grenadier Precision Limited.

In 2006, retired U.S. Army veteran Pat Bryan, along with a management team, purchased the company and began to manufacture firearms. The company focused on producing a proprietary short-stroke gas piston system on the M4 platform.

In 2008, Richard Bernstein and a group of investors purchased LWRC International. Bernstein was president and CEO after the purchase. The company has been focused on improving upon the direct impingement M4 carbine assault rifle. They provide weapons to The Pentagon, the Jordanian Armed Forces, and Georgia SWAT. Darren Mellors and Jesse Gomez, employees of the previous LWRC and Grenadier, were tasked with marketing and development. The former LWRC CEO Pat Bryan was retained to focus on international marketing.

The company produces several M6 series weapons based on the M4 carbine, which use a proprietary short-stroke self-regulating gas piston system and bolt carrier design. This system prevents trapped gases from contacting the bolt carrier or receiver of the weapon, which reduces the heating and carbon fouling of the internals, simplifies field maintenance, and improves reliability.

Three segments of the Discovery Channel show Future Weapons were filmed featuring LWRC's weapons. Weapons featured were the M6A2, M6A4, and the Sniper/Assaulter Battle Rifle (LWRC SABR).
