= Ronnie Barrett =

Founder of Barrett Firearms (born 1954)

Ronnie G. Barrett
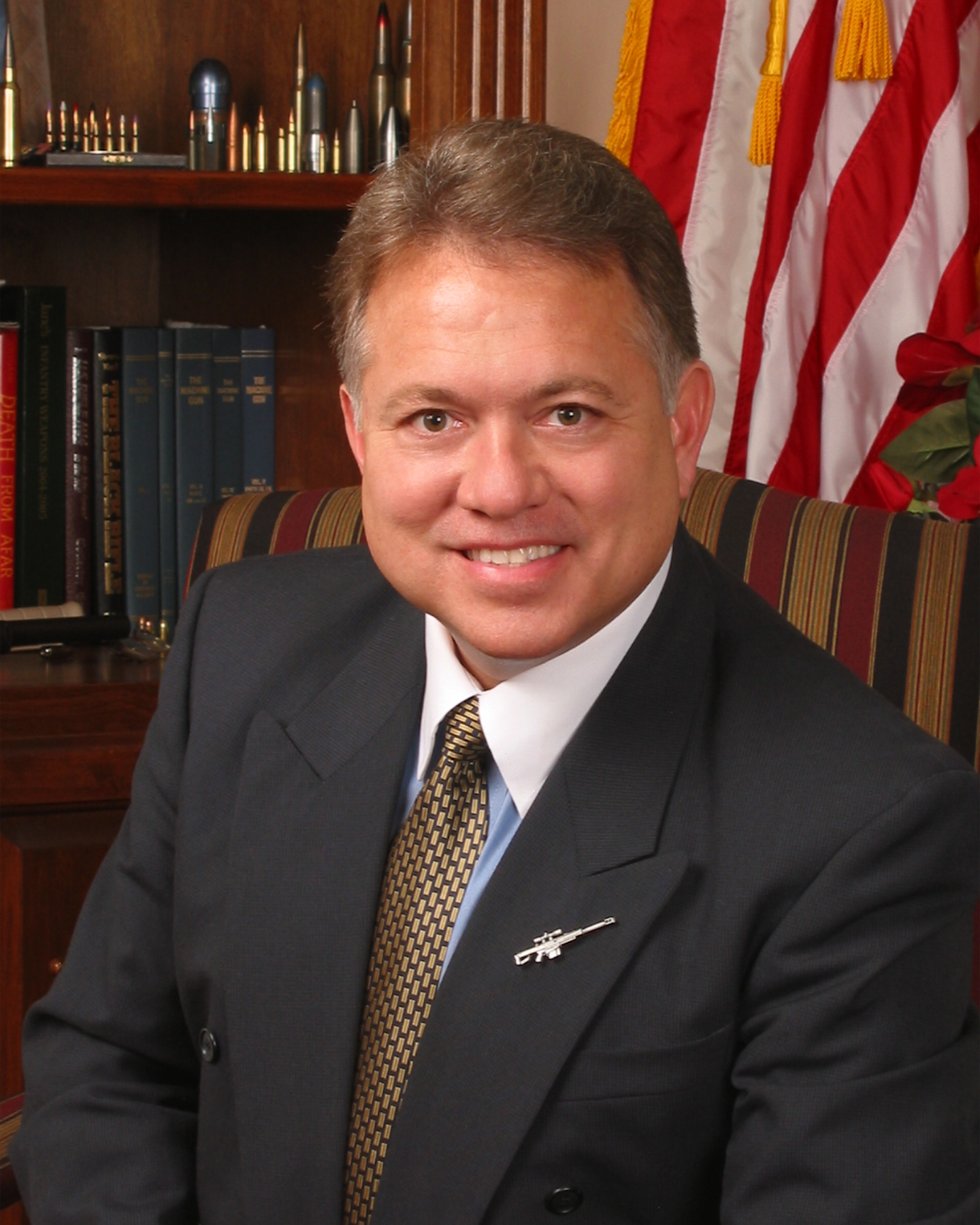
- Barrett in 2009
- Born: 5 March 1954 (age 72); Murfreesboro, Tennessee, U.S.
- Citizenship: American
- Education: Murfreesboro Central High School
- Known for: Barrett Firearms Manufacturing, Barrett M82
- Spouse: Donna Rowland (m. 2010)
- Children: Chris Barrett; Angela Barrett

Ronnie G. Barrett (born 1954) is the founder of Barrett Firearms Manufacturing of Christiana, Tennessee, board member of the National Rifle Association of America, and the designer of the Barrett M82.

== Life and career ==
Barrett was born in Murfreesboro, Tennessee in 1954, and graduated from Murfreesboro Central High School. He started his career in 1972 as a professional photographer for a studio in the same town. In 1982, while he owned a photography studio, he was inspired to create the Barrett M82. On January 1, 1982, when Barrett was photographing a river patrol gunboat on the Stones River near Nashville, Tennessee, a picture he shot of the twin Browning machine guns mounted prominently on the boat made him think of the .50 BMG cartridge and its potential for commercial users.

With no engineering background, Barrett hand-sketched plans at home for a .50BMG repeating semi-automatic rifle. Later, he found a partner in tool and die maker Bob Mitchell and an employee at a sheet metal fabricator in Smyrna, Tennessee. Four months later a prototype was finished. A second prototype shown off at a gun show in Houston would garner starting capital for Barrett from three investors, necessary for the Barrett Firearms Manufacturing company and production of the first 30 rifles for private use. Large-scale commercial success came when the CIA acquired an unknown number of rifles for arming the Afghan mujahideen as part of the Soviet–Afghan War effort. In 1989, the Swedish Army adopted the M82 as a sniper rifle. In 1990, the United States Armed Forces followed, and subsequently deployed the rifles during Operation Desert storm.

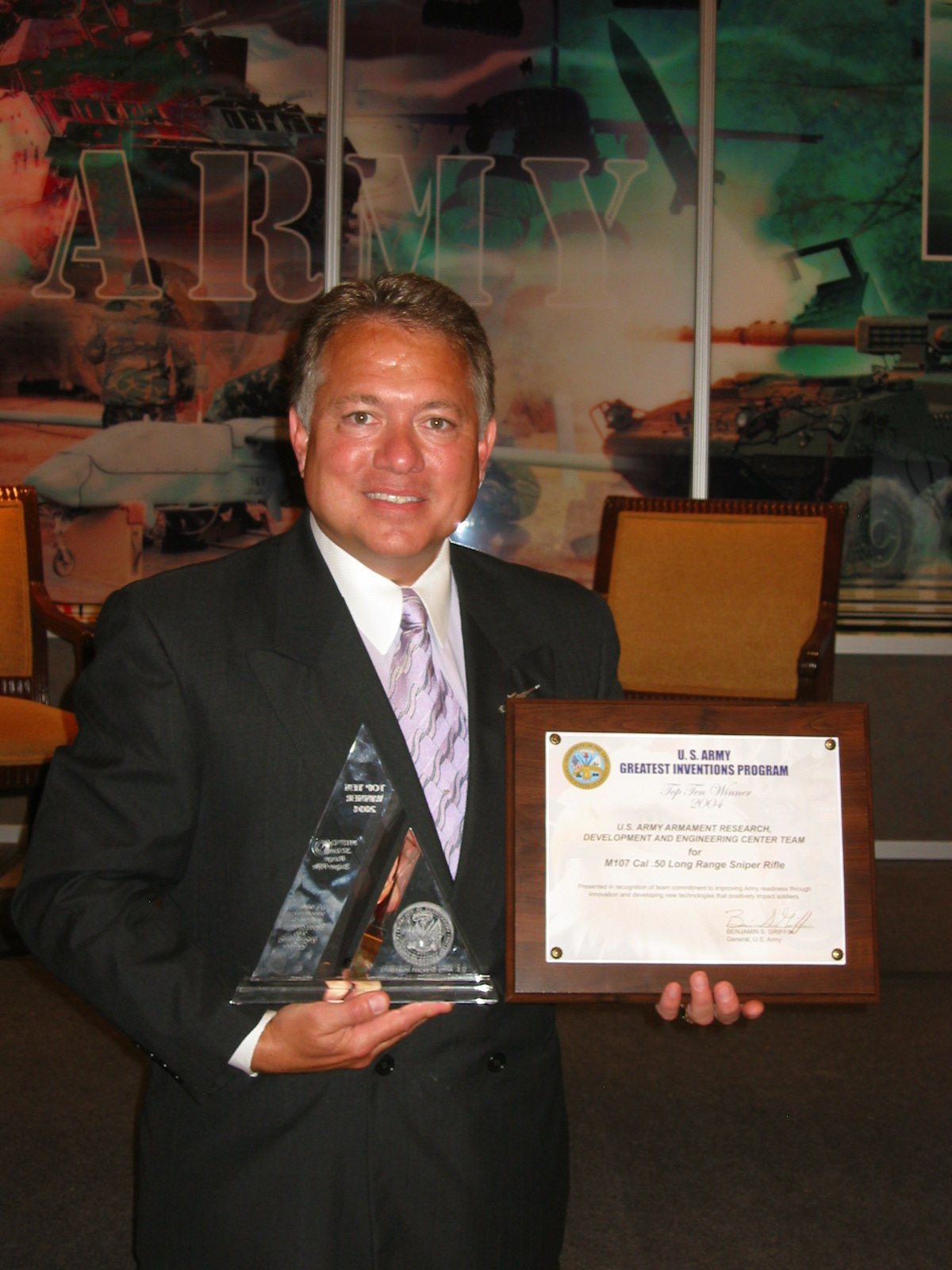
Ronnie Barrett Top 10 Award

Barrett is an advocate for the private ownership of firearms. Barrett has headed fundraising campaigns for the National Rifle Association, sits on its board of directors, and makes occasional appearances on the Cam & Company podcast where he speaks on gun laws. Following the ban on civilian ownership of .50 BMG firearms in California, Barrett announced that his company will no longer sell firearms to any state government agency in California.

Barrett married former Tennessee State Rep. Donna Rowland in 2010.
