= Barrett REC7 =

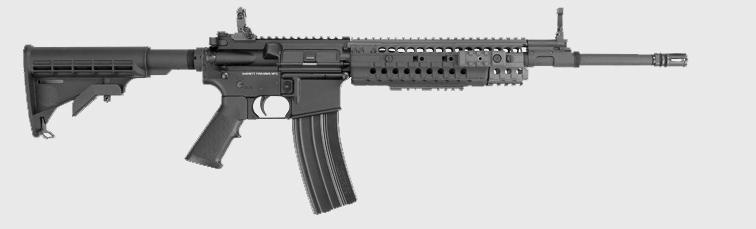
- The Barrett REC7
- Type: Semi-automatic rifle, Assault rifle (Full auto/Select fire version)
- Place of origin: United States

Production history
- Designed: 2007
- Manufacturer: Barrett Firearms Manufacturing
- Unit cost: $2,399 (average)

Specifications
- Mass: 3.4 kg
- Length: 831.85 mm (collapsed); 927.1 mm (fully extended)
- Cartridge: 5.56×45mm NATO and 6.8mm Remington SPC
- Action: Gas-operated short-stroke piston, rotating bolt
- Effective firing range: 600 m – 800 m
- Feed system: Barrett-compliant 30-round detachable magazine
- Sights: Iron sights, picatinny-rail

The Barrett REC7 (designation stands for "reliability-enhanced carbine") is an American firearm manufactured as a selective-fire fully-automatic and semi-automatic rifle by Barrett Firearms. It is an M4 carbine utilizing a short-stroke gas piston system and is available in either 5.56×45mm NATO or 6.8mm Remington SPC. The REC7 is Barrett's second AR-pattern rifle chambered for the 6.8mm Remington SPC cartridge, the first being the Barrett M468 rifle. The 6.8 SPC-chambered M468 rifle employed the same Stoner bolt and carrier piston system as the M4.

== Design and features ==
Unlike possible replacements for the M16/M4 such as the now canceled XM8, the REC7 is not an entirely new rifle, instead it is made up of an upper receiver that is attached to an M16/M4 lower receiver and is compatible with many accessories intended for the M16/M4 family. It can also be mated to M16/M4 lower receivers currently in the possession of the US military. The rifle uses a short-stroke gas piston mechanism, unlike the M16 or M4 which use Stoner bolt and carrier piston.

In addition, the REC7 uses the new 6.8mm Remington SPC (6.8×43mm) cartridge, a round that is of roughly equivalent length to 5.56×45mm NATO ammunition, so it is compatible with a standard-size lower receiver currently in use by the United States military.

The REC7 uses a short-stroke gas piston designed by Barrett. It rides above the barrel and is housed inside the fore-end. The spring-loaded piston is a one-piece 17-4 stainless steel rod. The forward and rearward movement of the piston is approximately one inch.

Like many AR-15 type rifles, such as the M16/M4, the barrel is threaded to allow muzzle attachments such as a suppressor. The REC7 employs a free-floating Daniel Defense rail system, which allows many military accessories such as a bipod, night vision devices, and combat optics to be placed on the rifle. The REC7 features forged 7075 aluminum upper and lower receivers that are hard-coat anodized a deep black. The lower receiver has a single-stage trigger, a Magpul enhanced trigger guard for firing with gloves, and a beveled magazine well for rapid magazine changes. The upper receiver is flat-top with a Picatinny rail. The barrel is chrome-lined and is fitted with a M16A2 flash suppressor, a six-position Magpul MOE butt stock and pistol grip.

The REC7 outfitted in a shortened barrel PDW configuration was one of the weapons displayed to U.S. Army officials during an invitation-only Industry Day on November 13, 2008. The goal of the Industry Day was to review current carbine technology prior to writing formal requirements for a future replacement for the M4 carbine. The Barrett Enhanced Bolt is made from high-strength 9310 steel. The bolt is designed specifically for use in the piston operated REC7, not just adapted from a direct gas bolt. The bolt's gas-ring-free design is easy to clean. Reinforced at critical areas, every bolt is proofed and magnetic-particle inspected to guarantee reliable performance. At the heart of the operating system is a nitrided, two-position, forward-venting gas plug that retains the piston. The piston can be accessed through the front of the gas block without removing the handguard so optical sights or laser devices do not need to be zeroed after routine maintenance. The REC7 rifle's forged 7075 aluminum upper and lower receivers are Type 3 hardcoat anodized. The lower houses an ultra-dependable single-stage trigger. The upper supports a free-floated, hammer-forged, chrome-lined barrel with M4 feed ramps machined into the receiver and the barrel extension. A mil-spec A2 flash hider protects the muzzle.
