= Donna Rowland =

American politician (born 1969)

Member of the Tennessee House of Representatives
- In office January 9, 2001 – January 11, 2011
- Preceded by: Mary Ann Eckles
- Succeeded by: Rick Womick
- Constituency: 49th district (2001-2003); 34th district (2003-2011)

Personal details
- Born: June 5, 1969 (age 57) Shelbyville, Tennessee, U.S.
- Party: Republican
- Spouse: Ronnie Barrett
- Education: Middle Tennessee State University
- Website: House website

Military service
- Allegiance: Tennessee
- Branch/service: Tennessee State Guard
- Rank: Major

Donna Rowland Barrett (born June 5, 1969) is a former Republican member of the State Representative in the Tennessee General Assembly for the 34th House District in Rutherford County, Tennessee. She served as the State Representative from that area from 2000 to 2010.

== Biography ==
Barrett attended Middle Tennessee State University. She is married to Ronnie Barrett, CEO of Barrett Firearms.

== Public service ==
In 1998, Barrett unsuccessfully ran against incumbent Representative Mary Ann Eckles for the 49th District House Seat, receiving 48% of the vote. In 2000, she ran a successful campaign against Mary Ann Eckles. She served in the Tennessee House of Representatives from 2000 to 2010. She was a member of the Finance, Ways and Means Committee, the Children and Family Affairs Committee, and the Consumer and Employee Affairs Committee. She also served on the powerful Fiscal Review Committee, overseeing government spending for the state. In 2005 she was awarded the "Taxpayer Hero Award" by Tennessee Tax Revolt, Inc.

In April 2010, she was one of five persons added to the governing body of the Tennessee Center for Policy Research (TCPR).
