= List of sniper rifles =

Major precision rifle variants used by snipers from around the world are as follows. The list includes hunting or precision rifles equipped with a telescopic optic, and precision rifles used by both military and law enforcement trained snipers and marksmen.

Name	Manufacturer(s)	Image	Cartridge(s)	Action	Origin	Year
7.62 Tkiv 85	Valmet		7.6×53mmR	Bolt-action	Finland	1984
Accuracy International Arctic Warfare (L96A1)	Accuracy International		7.62×51mm NATO.308 Winchester	Bolt-action	United Kingdom	1982
Accuracy International AS50	Accuracy International		.50 BMG	Direct impingement (semi-auto)	United Kingdom	2007
Accuracy International AW50	Accuracy International		.50 BMG	Bolt-action	United Kingdom	2000
Accuracy International AWM	Accuracy International		.300 Winchester Magnum.338 Lapua Magnum	Bolt-action	United Kingdom	1996
Accuracy International AX50	Accuracy International		.50 BMG	Bolt-action	United Kingdom	2010
Alejandro sniper rifle	Union de Industrias Militares		7.62×54mmR	Bolt-action	Cuba	2002
AMR-2	China South Industries Group		12.7×108mm	Bolt-action	China	2000 approx.
Anzio 20mm rifle	Anzio Iron Works		20×102mm	Bolt-action	United States	2006
Arash anti-materiel rifle			20×102mm	Gas operation (semi-auto)	Iran	2013
ArmaLite AR10T	ArmaLite		7.62×51mm NATO.308 Winchester.338 Federal	Direct impingement (semi-auto)	United States	1956
ArmaLite AR-50	ArmaLite		.50 BMG.416 Barrett	Bolt-action (single-shot)	United States	1997
Azb DMR MK1	Pakistan Ordnance Factories		7.62×51mm NATO	Roller-delayed blowback (semi-auto)	Pakistan	2014
Baher anti-materiel rifle			23×152mmB		Iran	
Barrett M82	Barrett Firearms Company		.50 BMG.416 Barrett	Short-recoil (semi-auto)	United States	1980
Barrett M90	Barrett Firearms Company		.50 BMG	Bolt-action	United States	1990
Barrett M95	Barrett Firearms Company		.50 BMG	Bolt-action	United States	1995
Barrett M99	Barrett Firearms Company		.50 BMG.416 Barrett	Bolt-action (single-shot)	United States	1999
Barrett Model 98B	Barrett Firearms Company		.338 Lapua Magnum	Bolt-action	United States	1997
Barrett MRAD	Barrett Firearms Company		6.5mm Creedmoor; 7mm Remington Magnum.308 Winchester.300 Winchester Magnum.338 Lapua Magnum.338 Norma Magnum	Bolt-action	United States	2009
Barrett XM109	Barrett Firearms Company		25×59mm	Short-recoil (semi-auto)	United States	2004
Barrett XM500	Barrett Firearms Company		.50 BMG	Gas operation (semi-auto)	United States	2006
Beretta Sniper	Beretta		7.62×51mm NATO	Bolt-action	Italy	1985
Blaser R93 Tactical	Blaser		7.62×51mm NATO.300 Winchester Magnum.338 Lapua Magnum; 6.5×55mm	Bolt-action	Germany	1993
Bor rifle	OBR SM Tarnów		7.62×51mm NATO.338 Lapua Magnum	Bolt-action	Poland	2005
Brügger & Thomet APR	Brügger & Thomet		7.62×51mm NATO.308 Winchester.338 Lapua Magnum	Bolt-action	Switzerland	2003
Bushmaster BA50 Rifle	Bushmaster Firearms International		.50 BMG	Bolt-action	United States	
C14 Timberwolf	PGW Defence Technologies Inc.		.338 Lapua Magnum	Bolt-action	Canada	2001
Cadex CDX-40	Cadex Defence		.375 EnABELR.375 CheyTac.408 CheyTac	Bolt-action	Canada	
CheyTac Intervention	CheyTac Inc.		.408 CheyTac.375 CheyTac	Bolt-action	United States	2001
Chukavin SVCH	Kalashnikov Concern		7.62×51mm.7.62×54mmR..338 Lapua Magnum	Long-stroke piston (semi-auto)	Russia	2023
Colt Canada C20 DMR	Colt Canada		7.62×51mm NATO	Direct impingement (semi-auto)	Canada	2020
Crazy Horse rifle	Smith Enterprise, Inc.		7.62×51mm NATO	Gas operation (semi-auto)	United States	2003
CS/LR3	Norinco		5.8×42mm	Bolt-action	China	
CS/LR4	Norinco		7.62×51mm NATO.308 Winchester.338 Lapua Magnum	Bolt-action	China	2008
CS/LR19	Norinco		7.62×54mmR	Gas operation (semi-auto)	China	2014
CS/LR35	Norinco		7.62×51mm NATO.338 Lapua Magnum	Bolt-action	China	2020
CSR 50	Caracal International		.50 BMG	Bolt-action	United Arab Emirates	2013
Cyclone	Steel Core Designs		7.62×51mm NATO.338 Magnum.50 BMG	Bolt-action	United Kingdom	2017
CZ 700 sniper rifle	Česká zbrojovka Uherský Brod		7.62×51mm NATO	Bolt-action	Czech Republic	2001
Denel NTW-20	Denel Land Systems		20×82mm 20×110mm Hispano; 14.5×114mm	Bolt-action	South Africa	1995
Desert Tech HTI	Desert Tech		.375 Cheyenne Tactical.408 Cheyenne Tactical.416 Barrett.50 BMG	Bolt-action	United States	2012
Desert Tech SRS	Desert Tech		.243 Winchester; 7.62×51mm NATO.300 Winchester Magnum.338 Lapua Magnum	Bolt-action	United States	2008
Dragunov SVD	Izhmash		7.62×54mmR	Short-stroke piston (semi-auto)	Soviet Union	1958
Dragunov SVDK	Izhmash		9.3×64mm Brenneke	Short-stroke piston (semi-auto)	Russia	2006
Dragunov SVU	KBP Instrument Design Bureau		7.62×54mmR	Short-stroke piston (semi-auto, select-fire OTs-03A variant)	Russia	1994
SA58 SPR	DSA Arms		7.62x51mm	Short-stroke piston (semi auto)	United States	2005
DSR-Precision DSR-1	DSR-precision GmbH		.308 Winchester.300 Winchester Magnum.338 Lapua Magnum	Bolt-action	Germany	2000
DSR-Precision DSR-50	DSR-precision GmbH		.50 BMG	Bolt-action	Germany	2003
Elmech EM 992	Elmech Razvoj		7.62×51mm NATO	Bolt-action	Croatia	1991
Elmech EMM 992	Elmech Razvoj		.300 Winchester Magnum	Bolt-action	Croatia	1991
EXACTO	Lockheed Martin; Teledyne Scientific & Imagining		.50 BMG		United States	2008
FN Ballista	FN Herstal		.300 Winchester Magnum.308 Winchester.338 Lapua Magnum	Bolt-action	Belgium	2013
FN FNAR	FN Manufacturing Co.		7.62×51mm NATO	Short-stroke piston (semi-auto)	United States	2008
FN SCAR PR; FN SCAR TPR/MK20 SSR	FN Herstal		7.62×51mm NATO; 6.5mm Creedmoor	Short-stroke piston (semi-auto)	Belgium	2009
FN Model 30-11	FN Herstal		7.62×51mm NATO	Bolt-action	Belgium	1976
FN Patrol Bolt Rifle	FN Herstal USA		7.62×51mm NATO.308 Winchester	Bolt-action	United States	
FN Special Police Rifle	FNH USA		7.62×51mm NATO.300 Winchester Short Magnum	Bolt-action	United States	2004
FN Tactical Sport Rifle	FN Herstal		7.62×51mm NATO.308 Winchester.300 Winchester Short Magnum.223 Remington (TSP-XP USA)	Bolt-action	Belgium; United States	2009
FR F1	Manufacture d'armes de Saint-Étienne		7.5×54mm French; 7.62×51mm NATO	Bolt-action	France	1966
FR F2 sniper rifle	Nexter		7.62×51mm NATO	Bolt-action	France	1984
Galil Sniper	Israel Military Industries		7.62×51mm NATO	Gas operation (semi-auto)	Israel	1983
Gepárd anti-materiel rifle	Sero International Kft.		12.7×108mm.50 BMG; 14.5×114mm	Single-shot (M1); Semi-auto (M2, M3, M4, M6); Bolt-action (M5)	Hungary	1991
Gewehr 98	Mauser		7.8×57 M/88; 7.92×57mm Mauser	Bolt-action	German Empire	1895
GOL Sniper Magnum	Gol-Matic GmbH		7.62×51mm.300 Winchester Magnum.338 Lapua Magnum	Bolt-action	Germany	1986
Grizzly Big Boar	L.A.R. Manufacturing Inc.		.50 BMG	Bolt-action	United States	
Grot 762N	FB "Łucznik" Radom		7.62×51mm NATO	Short-stroke piston (semi-auto)	Poland	2015
H-S Precision Pro Series 2000 HTR	H-S Precision		.338 Lapua Magnum.308 Winchester.300 Winchester Magnum	Bolt-action	United States	2000
Haenel RS9	C.G. Haenel		.338 Lapua Magnum	Bolt-action	Germany	2016
Hagelberg FH 50	Hagelberg Arms		.50 BMG	Bolt-action (single-shot)	Denmark	
Harris Gun Works M-96	Harris Gun Works		.50 BMG	Gas operation (semi-auto)	United States	1996
Haskins Rifle			8.58×71mm 7.62×51mm NATO.50 BMG	Bolt-action	United States	1981
Heckler & Koch G3SG1	Heckler & Koch		7.62×51mm NATO	Roller-delayed blowback (semi-auto)	West Germany	1955
Heckler & Koch G28	Heckler & Koch		7.62×51mm NATO	Short-stroke piston (semi-auto)	Germany	2005
Heckler & Koch MSG90	Heckler & Koch		7.62×51mm NATO	Roller-delayed blowback (semi-auto)	Germany	1990
Heckler & Koch PSG1	Heckler & Koch		7.62×51mm NATO	Roller-delayed blowback (semi-auto)	West Germany	1970s
Heckler & Koch SL8	Heckler & Koch		.223 Remington; 5.56x45mm.300 Whisper	Gas operation (semi auto)	West Germany	1998
Heckler & Koch XM8 Sharpshooter	Heckler & Koch		5.56×45mm NATO	Gas operation (select-fire)	Germany; United States	2003
Howa 1500	Howa		.22-250 Remington.223 Remington.204 Ruger; 6.5×55mm.300 Winchester Magnum.308 Winchester.30-06 Springfield.375 Ruger	Bolt-action	Japan	1979
Istiglal Anti-Materiel Rifle	Azerbaijani Defense Industry		12.7×108mm 14.5×114mm	Short-recoil (semi-auto)	Azerbaijan	2008
Iver Johnson AMAC-1500	Iver Johnson Arms		.50 BMG	Bolt-action (single-shot)	United States	1981
IWI Dan	Israel Weapon Industries		.338 Lapua Magnum	Bolt-action	Israel	2010
JS 7.62	China South Industries Group		7.62×54mmR	Bolt-action	China	2005
K-11	Armenian Ministry of Defence Industrial Department		5.45×39mm 7.62×54mmR	Bolt-action	Armenia	1996
Karabiner 98k	Mauser		7.92×57mm Mauser	Bolt-action	Germany	1935
Kalekalıp KNT-308	MKEK		7.62×51mm NATO	Bolt-action	Turkey	2008
Kefefs	Elliniki Viomichania Oplon		7.62×51mm NATO	Bolt-action	Greece	1995
Komodo Armament D7 PMR SA	Komodo Armament		7.62×51mm NATO	Direct impingement (semi-auto)	Indonesia	2014
Komodo Armament D7CH	Komodo Armament		7.62×51mm NATO	Bolt-action	Indonesia	2018
Kongsberg M59	Kongsberg Gruppen		.30-06 Springfield; 7.62×51mm NATO	Bolt-action	Norway	1959
Kongsberg M67	Kongsberg Gruppen		7.62×51mm NATO; 6.5×55mm.22 Long Rifle	Bolt-action	Norway	1967
Krag–Jørgensen	Kongsberg Våpenfabrikk		8×58mmR Danish Krag.30-40 Krag; 6.5×55mm Swedish	Bolt-action	Norway	1886
KSVK 12.7	Degtyarev plant		12.7×108mm	Bolt-action	Russia	1997
L42A1	RSAF Enfield		7.62×51mm NATO	Bolt-action	United Kingdom	1970
L129A1	Lewis Machine & Tool Company		7.62×51mm NATO; 6.5mm Creedmoor	Direct impingement (semi-auto)	United States; United Kingdom	2009
Lobaev Sniper Rifle	Lobaev Arms		408 LW .40 LW (Lobaev Whisper, 10+ x 48 mm); 338LW 8.6x39 mm.375 CheyTac, 408 Lapua, .408 CheyTac, .338 Lapua Magnum, 408 LI, 6.5×47mm Lapua, others	Bolt-action	Russia	2010
Longbow T-76	Dakota Arms		.338 Lapua Magnum	Bolt-action	United States	1997
Lee-Enfield	RSAF Enfield		.303 Mk VII SAA Ball	Bolt-action	United Kingdom	1895
LSR	Pakistan Ordnance Factories		7.62×51mm NATO	Bolt-action	Pakistan	2016
LWRC SABR	LWRC International		7.62x51mm NATO	Short-stroke piston (semi-auto)	United States	2008
M1C/M1D Garand	Springfield Armory		.30-06 Springfield; 7.62×51mm NATO.308 Winchester	Long-stroke piston (semi-auto)	United States	1928
M21 Sniper Weapon System	Rock Island Arsenal; Springfield Armory		7.62×51mm NATO	Short-stroke piston (semi-auto)	United States	1969
M24 Sniper Weapon System	Remington Arms		7.62×51mm NATO.338 Lapua Magnum (M24A3).300 Winchester Magnum (experimental)	Bolt-action	United States	1988
M25 Sniper Weapon System	Springfield Armory		7.62×51mm NATO	Short-stroke piston (semi-auto)	United States	1980s
M38 DMR	Heckler & Koch		5.56×45mm NATO	Short-stroke piston (select-fire)	Germany	2008
M39 Enhanced Marksman Rifle	United States Marine Corps		7.62×51mm NATO	Short-stroke piston (semi-auto)	United States	2008
M40 rifle	Remington Arms		7.62×51mm NATO	Bolt-action	United States	1966
M86 sniper rifle	Harris Gunworks		7.62x51mm NATO.300 Winchester Magnum.338 Lapua Magnum	Bolt-action	United States	
M89SR sniper rifle	Technical Consultants International		7.62×51mm NATO	Short-stroke piston (semi-auto)	Israel	1980s
M110 Semi-Automatic Sniper System	Knight's Armament Company		7.62×51mm NATO; 6.5mm Creedmoor (M110A3)	Direct impingement (semi-auto)	United States	2007
M110A1 CSASS	Heckler & Koch		7.62×51mm NATO	Short-stroke piston (semi-auto)	United States	2016
M1903 Springfield	Springfield Armory		.30-03 Springfield.30-06 Springfield	Bolt-action	United States	1903
M2010 Enhanced Sniper Rifle	Remington Arms		.300 Winchester Magnum	Bolt-action	United States	2010
MACS M3			.50 BMG	Bolt-action (single-shot)	Croatia	1991
Mambi AMR	Union de Industrias Militares		14.5×114mm	Gas operation (semi-auto)	Cuba	1981
Marine Scout Sniper Rifle	Philippine Marine Corps		5.56×45mm NATO	Direct impingement (semi-auto)	Philippines	1996
McMillan TAC-50	McMillan Firearms		.50 BMG	Bolt-action	United States	1980s
McMillan Tac-338	McMillan Firearms		.338 Lapua Magnum	Bolt-action	United States	
MCR Horizon's Lord	Mayak		.50 BMG; 12.7×108mm 14.5×114mm 23×115mm 12.7×114mmHL		Ukraine	2015
MICOR Leader 50	MICOR Defence		.50 BMG	Short-stroke piston (semi-auto)	United States	2012
Mk 12 Special Purpose Rifle			5.56×45mm NATO	Direct impingement (select-fire)	United States	2002
Mk 13 rifle	Accuracy International; Remington Arms		.300 Winchester Magnum	Bolt-action	United Kingdom; United States	2018
Mk 14 Enhanced Battle Rifle	Naval Surface Warfare Center Crane Division, Smith Enterprise Inc., Mike Rock & Jim Ribordy		7.62×51mm NATO	Short-stroke piston (select-fire/semi auto)	United States	2002
MKE JNG-90	MKEK		7.62×51mm NATO	Bolt-action	Turkey	2004
Mosin–Nagant	Tula; Izhevsk; Sestroryetsk		7.62×54mmR	Bolt-action	Russian Empire	1891
MS-74	Izhevsk Machinebuilding Plant		7.62×54mmR	Bolt-action	Soviet Union	1949
MTs-116M	TsKIB SOO		7.62×54mmR	Bolt-action	Russia	1997
Nasr			12.7x108mm		Iran	2016
Orsis T-5000	ORSIS		6.5×47mm Lapua; 7.62×51mm NATO (.308 Winchester).300 Winchester Magnum.338 Lapua Magnum.375 CheyTac	Bolt-action	Russia	2018
OSV-96	KBP Instrument Design Bureau		12.7×108mm	Direct impingement (semi-auto)	Soviet Union	1990
Parker-Hale M82	Parker-Hale		7.62×51mm NATO	Bolt-action	United Kingdom	1960s
Parker-Hale M85	Parker-Hale		7.62×51mm NATO	Bolt-action	United Kingdom	1985
Pattern 1914 Enfield	RSAF Enfield		.303 British	Bolt-action	United Kingdom	1914
Pauza P-50	Pauza Specialties		.50 BMG	Gas operation (semi-auto)	United States	1990
PDShP	STC Delta		12.7×108mm	Long-recoil (mod-1); Bolt-action (mod-2)	Georgia	2012
Pindad SPR-1; Pindad SPR-3	Pindad		7.62×51mm NATO	Bolt-action	Indonesia	(1980s)-2003 2010
Pindad SPR-2	Pindad		.50 BMG	Bolt-action	Indonesia	2007
Pindad SPR-4	Pindad		.338 Lapua Magnum	Bolt-action	Indonesia	2017
Pindad SPM-2	Pindad		7.62×51mm NATO	Gas operation (semi auto)	Indonesia	2020s
PGM 338	PGM Précision		.338 Lapua Magnum	Bolt-action	France	1993
PGM Hécate II	PGM Précision		.50 BMG	Bolt-action	France	1993
PGM Ultima Ratio	PGM Précision		7.62×51mm NATO.300 Savage; 7mm-08 Remington; 6.5-08 A-Square; 6.5×47mm Lapua; 6mm BR	Bolt-action	France	2000
PSR-90	Pakistan Ordnance Factories		7.62×51mm NATO.308	Roller-delayed blowback (semi-auto)	Pakistan	2010
Puşca Semiautomată cu Lunetă	Fabrica de Arme Cugir SA		7.62×54mmR; 7.62×51mm NATO	Long-stroke piston (semi-auto)	Romania	1974
QBU-10	Norinco		12.7×108mm	Short recoil (semi-auto)	China	2006
QBU-88	Norinco		5.8×42mm DBP87; 5.56×45mm NATO	Short-stroke piston (semi-auto)	China	1990s
QBU-201	Norinco		12.7×108mm	Bolt-action	China	
R-20 L	Lewis Machine & Tool Company		7.62×51mm NATO	Gas operation (select-fire)	United States; Estonia	2019
Ramo M600	Ramo Defence		.50 BMG; 12.7×108mm 14.5×114mm	Bolt-action	United States	
Remington MSR	Remington Arms		.338 Lapua Magnum.338 Norma Magnum.300 Winchester Magnum.308 Winchester; 7.62×51mm NATO	Bolt-action	United States	2009
Remington Semi Automatic Sniper System	Remington Arms		7.62×51mm NATO	Direct impingement (semi-auto)	United States	2010
Remington SR-8	Remington Arms		.338 Lapua Magnum	Bolt-action	United States	
Robar RC-50	Robar Companies, Inc		.50 BMG	Bolt-action	United States	1985
RPA Rangemaster	RPA Defence		7.62×51mm NATO.338 Lapua Magnum.50 BMG	Bolt-action	United Kingdom	2001
RT-20	Metallic		20×110mm Hispano	Bolt-action (single-shot)	Croatia	1994
S&T Motiv K14	S&T Motiv		.308 Winchester	Bolt-action	South Korea	2011
STSR20	SNT Motiv		.50 BMG	Short-recoil (semi-auto)	South Korea	2020
STSR23	SNT Motiv		7.62×51mm NATO	Short recoil (semi-auto)	South Korea	2020
Sako M23	SAKO		7.62×51mm NATO	Short-stroke piston (select-fire)	Finland	2022
Sako TRG	SAKO		.260 Remington; 6.5mm Creedmoor.308 Winchester.300 Winchester Magnum.338 Lapua Magnum	Bolt-action	Finland	1989
Sako TRG M10; C21 MCSW	SAKO		7.62×51mm NATO.300 Winchester Magnum.338 Lapua Magnum	Bolt-action	Finland	2011
SAN 511	SIG Sauer AG		.50 BMG	Bolt-action	Switzerland	2001
Satevari MSWP	STC Delta		.300 Winchester Magnum.300 Norma Magnum.308 Winchester.338 Lapua Magnum.338 GBM.375 GBM.50 BMG	Bolt-action	Georgia	2015
Savage 10FP	Savage Arms Company		.223 Remington.300 Winchester Magnum.308 Winchester.338 Lapua Magnum	Bolt-action	United States	1956
Savage 110 BA	Savage Arms Company		.338 Lapua Magnum.300 Winchester Magnum	Bolt-action	United States	2009
SC-76 Thunderbolt	Steel Core Designs		.308 Winchester; 7.62×51mm NATO	Bolt-action	United Kingdom	
SEAL Recon Rifle	NAVSEA		5.56×45mm NATO	Direct impingement (select-fire)	United States	1993
Shaher anti-materiel rifle	Defense Industries Organization		14.5×114mm	Bolt-action	Iran	2012
SIG550-1 Sniper; ZF Stgw 90	Swiss Arms AG		5.56x45mm	Long-stroke piston (select-fire)	Switzerland	1970s–1980s
SIG750	Swiss Arms AG		6.5mm Creedmoor	Long-stroke piston (semi-auto)	Switzerland	2004
SIG751 SAPR	Swiss Arms AG		7.62x51mm	Long-stroke piston (select-fire)	Switzerland	2004
SIG Sauer SSG 2000	SIG Sauer		7.62×51mm NATO.300 Winchester Magnum; 7.5×55mm Swiss	Bolt-action	West Germany; Switzerland	1989
SIG Sauer SSG 3000	SIG Sauer		7.62×51mm NATO	Bolt-action	Germany; Switzerland	1992
Siyavash sniper rifle			7.62×51mm NATO	Bolt-action	Iran	2013
Snipex Alligator	XADO-Holding Ltd.		14.5×114mm	Bolt-action	Ukraine	2020
Snipex M	XADO-Holding Ltd.		12.7×108mm	Bolt-action (single-shot)	Ukraine	2017
Snipex Rhino Hunter	XADO-Holding Ltd.		.50 BMG	Bolt-action (single-shot)	Ukraine	2017
Snipex T-Rex	XADO-Holding Ltd.		14.5×114mm	Bolt-action (single-shot)	Ukraine	2020
Squad Advanced Marksman Rifle	USMC Precision Weapons Section		5.56×45mm NATO	Direct impingement (semi-auto)	United States	2001
Squad Designated Marksman Rifle	United States Army Marksmanship Unit		5.56×45mm NATO	Direct impingement (select-fire)	United States	2004
SR-25	Knight's Armament Company		7.62×51mm NATO	Direct impingement (semi-auto)	United States	1990
SSG 82	VEB Fahrzeug- und Jagdwaffenwerk "Ernst Thälmann" Suhl		5.45×39mm	Bolt-action	East Germany	1982
Steyr HS .50 / HS .460	Steyr Mannlicher		.50 BMG.460 Steyr	Bolt-action (single-shot)	Austria	2004
Steyr SSG 04	Steyr Mannlicher		.308 Winchester.300 Winchester Magnum	Bolt-action	Austria	2004
Steyr SSG 08	Steyr Mannlicher		.243 Winchester; 7.62×51mm NATO.300 Winchester Magnum.338 Lapua Magnum	Bolt-action	Austria	2008
Steyr SSG 69	Steyr Mannlicher		7.62×51mm NATO.243 Winchester.22–250	Bolt-action	Austria	1969
Steyr IWS 2000	Steyr Mannlicher		15.2×169mm	Long-recoil (single-shot)	Austria	1980s
Steyr Scout	Steyr Mannlicher		5.56×45mm NATO.223 Remington.243 Winchester; 7mm-08 7.62×51mm NATO.308 Winchester.376 Steyr	Bolt-action	Austria	1997
SV-18	Kalashnikov Concern		12.7×108mm.50 BMG	Bolt-action	Russia	2019
SV-98	Izhmash		7.62×54mmR.338 Lapua Magnum; 7.62×51mm NATO	Bolt-action	Russia	1998
T-12 sniper rifle	MKEK		5.56×45mm NATO	Bolt-action	Turkey	
T93 sniper rifle	205th Armory		7.62×51mm NATO	Bolt-action	Taiwan	2003
T108 sniper rifle	205th Armory		7.62×51mm NATO	Bolt-action	Taiwan	2022
Tabuk Sniper Rifle	Al-Qadissiya Establishments		7.62×39mm	Long-stroke piston (semi-auto)	Iraq	1970s
Taher sniper rifle	Defense Industries Organization		7.62×51mm NATO	Bolt-action	Iran	2016
Tango 51	Tactical Operations Incorporated		7.62×51mm NATO.308 Winchester	Bolt-action	United States	2000
Tikka M55	Tikkakoski		.17 Remington.222 Remington.223 Remington.22-250 Remington; 6mm Remington.243 Winchester; 7.62×39mm.308 Winchester	Bolt-action	Finland	1968
Tikka M65	Tikkakoski		.25-06 Remington; 6.5×55mm Swedish.270 Winchester; 7×57mm Mauser; 7×64mm 7mm Remington Magnum.308 Winchester.30-06 Springfield.300 Winchester Magnum.338 Winchester Magnum; 9.3×62mm	Bolt-action	Finland	1969
Tikka T3	SAKO		.204 Ruger.222 Remington.223 Remington.22-250 Remington.243 Winchester.25-06 Remington.260 Remington; 6.5 Creedmoor; 6.5×55mm 6.5 PRC.270 Winchester.270 Winchester Short Magnum; 7mm-08 Remington; 7×64mm 7mm Remington Magnum.308 Winchester/7.62×51mm NATO.30-06 Springfield.300 Winchester Short Magnum.300 Winchester Magnum; 8×57 IS.338 Federal.338 Winchester Magnum; 9.3×62mm	Bolt-action	Finland	2003
TPG-1	Unique Alpine AG		.223 Remington; 5.56×45mm NATO.338 Remington Ultra Magnum	Bolt-action	Germany	2000
Type 97 Sniper Rifle	Arisaka		6.5×50mmSR Arisaka	Bolt-action	Japan	1937
Type 99 sniper rifle			7.7×58mm Arisaka	Bolt-action	Japan	1939
United States Marine Corps Designated Marksman Rifle	USMC Precision Weapons Section		7.62×51mm NATO	Short-stroke piston (semi-auto)	United States	2001
Valmet Sniper M86	Valmet		.308 Winchester	Bolt-action	Finland	1987
Våpensmia NM149	Våpensmia A/S		7.62×51mm NATO	Bolt-action	Norway	1985
Vidhwansak	Ordnance Factories Organisation		12.7×108mm 14.5×114mm 20×82mm	Bolt-action	India	2005
VKS sniper rifle			12.7×55mm	Bolt-action	Russia	2002
Walther WA 2000	Walther Arms		7.62×51mm NATO.300 Winchester Magnum; 7.5×55mm Swiss	Gas operation (semi-auto)	West Germany	1970s
VSK-94	KBP Instrument Design Bureau		9×39mm	Long-stroke piston (select-fire)	Russia	1994
VSS Vintorez	Tula Arms Plant		9×39mm	Long-stroke piston (select-fire)	Soviet Union	1983
Vz. 54			7.62×54mmR	Bolt-action	Czechoslovakia	1951
Winchester Model 70	Winchester Repeating Arms Company		.30-06 Springfield	Bolt-action	United States	1936
WKW Tor	OBR SM Tarnów		.50 BMG	Bolt-action	Poland	2000
Yalguzag sniper rifle	Azerbaijani Defense Industry		7.62×51mm NATO	Bolt-action	Azerbaijan	2011
Yirtiji 7.62	Azerbaijan Defense Industry		7.62×54mmR	Gas operation (semi-auto)	Azerbaijan	2010
Zastava M07	Zastava Arms		7.62×51mm NATO	Bolt-action	Serbia	2006
Zastava M12 Black Spear	Zastava Arms		12.7×108mm.50 BMG	Bolt-action	Serbia	2012
Zastava M76	Zastava Arms		7.92×57mm Mauser	Long-stroke piston (semi-auto)	Yugoslavia	1975
Zastava M91	Zastava Arms		7.62×54mmR	Long-stroke piston (semi-auto)	Serbia and Montenegro	1991
Zastava M93 Black Arrow	Zastava Arms		12.7×108mm.50 BMG	Bolt-action	Serbia and Montenegro	1993
Zbroyar Z-008	Zbroyar				Ukraine	2007
Zbroyar Z-10	Zbroyar		7.62×51mm NATO		Ukraine	2012
Zf. Kar. 55	Waffenfabrik Bern		7.5×55mm Swiss	Bolt-action	Switzerland	1950s
Zijiang M99	Zijiang Machinery Company (Arsenal 9656)		12.7×108mm	Direct impingement (semi-auto)	China	2005
ZVI Falcon	Zbrojovka Vsetín Inc.		12.7×108mm.50 BMG	Bolt-action	Czech Republic	1998

== See also ==
- List of books, articles and documentaries about snipers
- List of anti-materiel rifles
- List of assault rifles
- List of battle rifles
- List of carbines
- List of bolt-action rifles
- List of straight-pull rifles
- List of pump-action rifles
- List of rifles
- List of pistols
- Sniper equipment
