= PDShP =

AMR -mod-1 (PDShP)
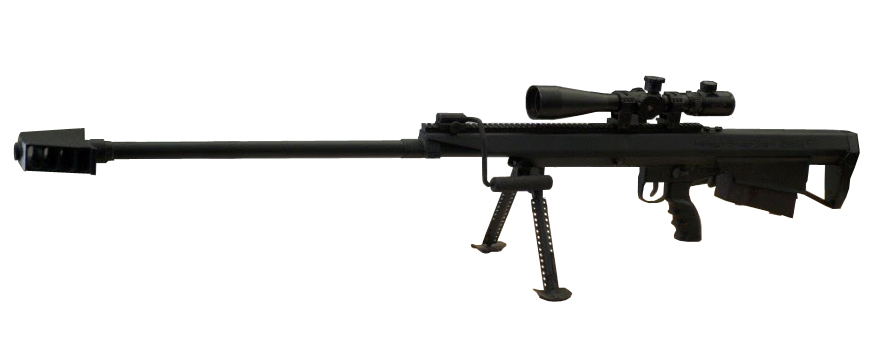
- The recoil operated long range 12.7×108mm PDShP rifle
- Type: Bullpup Anti-materiel rifle
- Place of origin: Republic of Georgia

Production history
- Designer: STC Delta
- Designed: 2012–2013
- Manufacturer: Scientific Technical Center Delta
- Produced: 2012–present

Specifications
- Mass: AMR (mod-1) 14 kg (31 lb); AMR (mod-2) 12 kg (26 lb)
- Length: 1,520 mm (60 in) (mod-1); 1,040 mm (41 in) (mod-2)
- Barrel length: 1,100 mm (43 in) (mod-1); 580 mm (23 in) (mod-2)
- Cartridge: 12.7×108mm
- Action: Semi-automatic (mod-1); Bolt action (mod-2)
- Muzzle velocity: 817 m/s (2,680 ft/s)
- Effective firing range: 1,800 m (5,900 ft) (mod-1); 1,000 m (3,300 ft) (mod-2)
- Feed system: 5-round detachable box magazine
- Sights: Various

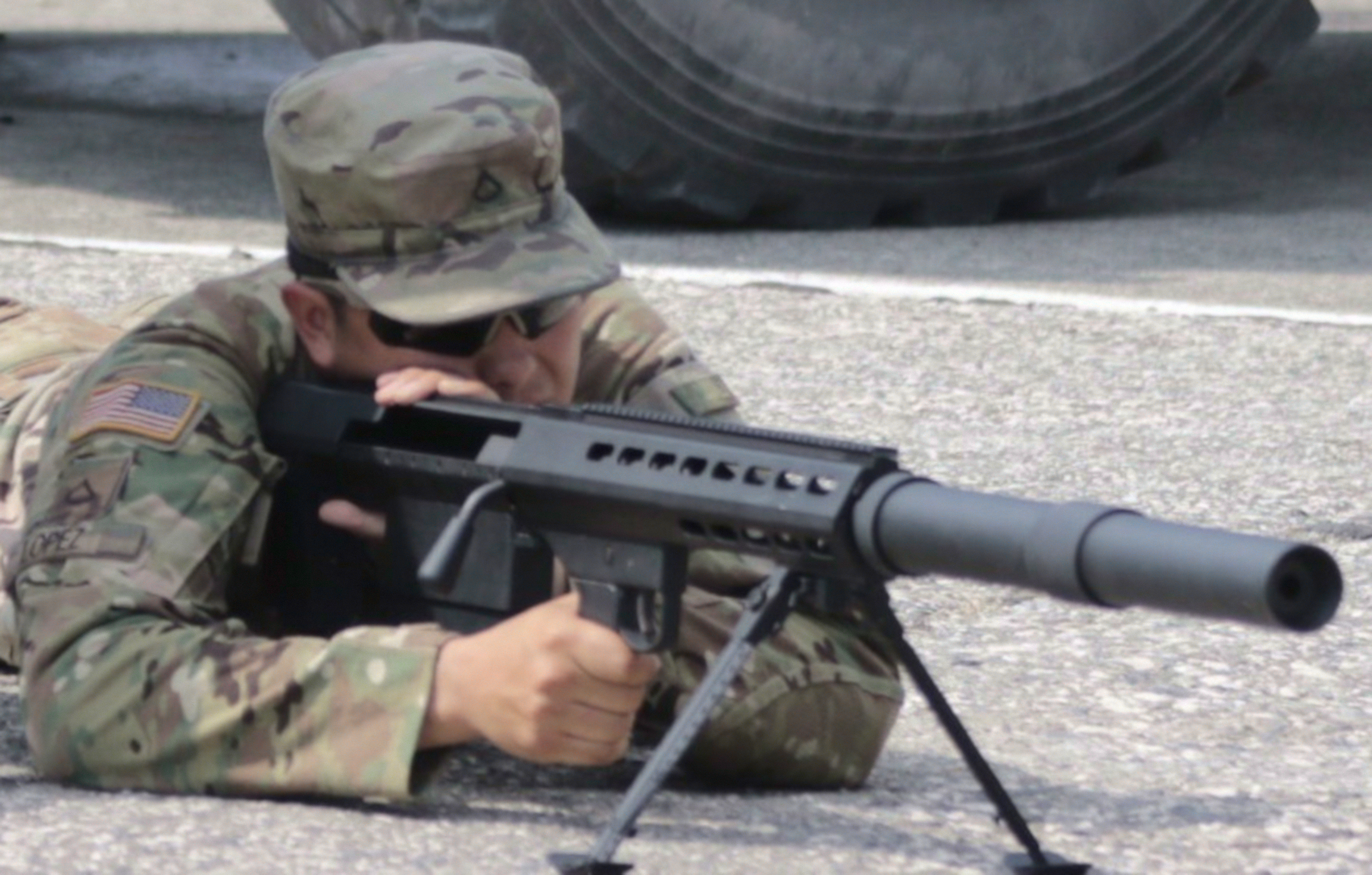
A US serviceman familiarizing with the AMR Mod II during an exercise, 2018

The PDShP (Georgian: პდშპ) is a series of bullpup anti-materiel rifles developed by the Georgian Military Scientific-Technical Center STC Delta. The weapons are based on a bullpup design and there are different versions, Amr mod-1 and Amr mod-2. Development of the current series was completed in 2013.

== History ==
The development of the rifles was complete in late 2012 to early 2013 but the weapons were not revealed earlier than May 2014.

== Variants ==
Currently there are two variants available. They are all bullpup configured. The more recent 12.7×108mm version is recoil-operated with a 6 round box magazine feed and has an effective range of 1,800–2,000 m (5,900–6,600 ft). Its development was completed in 2013.

== See also ==
- List of bullpup firearms
- List of sniper rifles
- KSVK 12.7
- OSV-96
- OM 50 Nemesis
- Barrett M82
- Barrett M95
- Zastava M93
- Zastava M12 Black Spear
