= Satevari MSWP =

Satevari, Satevari Modular Sniper Weapon Platform, Dagger
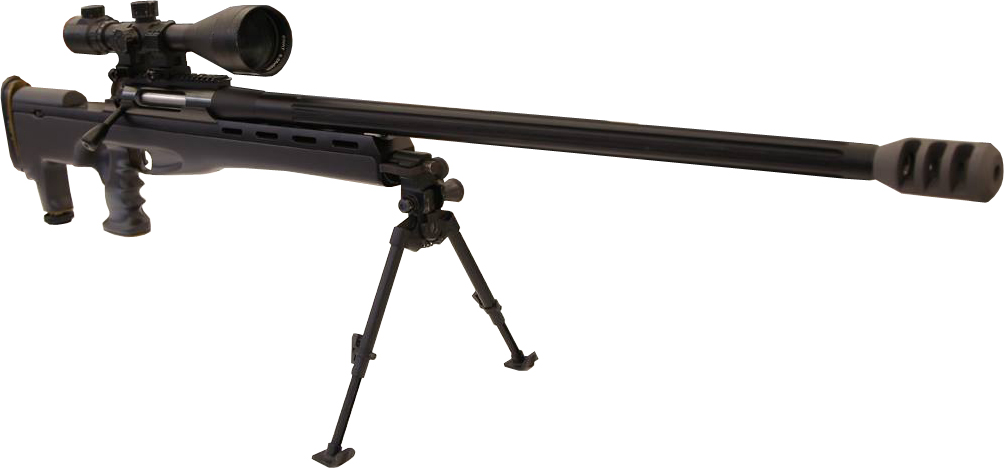
- Satevari-1 sniper rifle
- Type: sniper rifle anti-material rifle
- Place of origin: Georgia

Production history
- Designer: STC Delta
- Manufacturer: STC Delta
- Produced: 2015–present

Specifications
- Mass: 5.50 kg (12.1 lb) lightest variant (.308 Win); 12 kg (26 lb) heaviest variant (.50 BMG)
- Length: 1,160 mm (46 in) shortest variant (.308 Win); 1,300 mm (51 in) longest variant (.50 BMG)
- Barrel length: 525 mm (20.7 in) shortest barrel (.308 Win); 730 mm (29 in) longest barrel (.50 BMG)
- Cartridge: .300 Winchester Magnum.300 Norma Magnum.308 Winchester.338 Lapua Magnum.338 GBM.375 GBM.50 BMG
- Caliber: bicaliber
- Action: Bolt-action
- Effective firing range: 800 metres (875 yd) (.308 Win); 1,000 metres (1,094 yd) (.300 WM); 1,200 metres (1,312 yd) (.338 LM); 1,400 metres (1,531 yd) (.300 NM); 1,800 metres (1,969 yd) (.338 GBM); 1,800 metres (1,969 yd) (.375 GBM); 2,500 metres (2,734 yd) (.50 BMG)
- Feed system: 5-round detachable box magazine (308 Win, .300 WM, .300 NM); 4-round detachable box magazine (.338 LM, .338 GBM, .375 GBM, .50 BMG)
- Sights: Telescopic

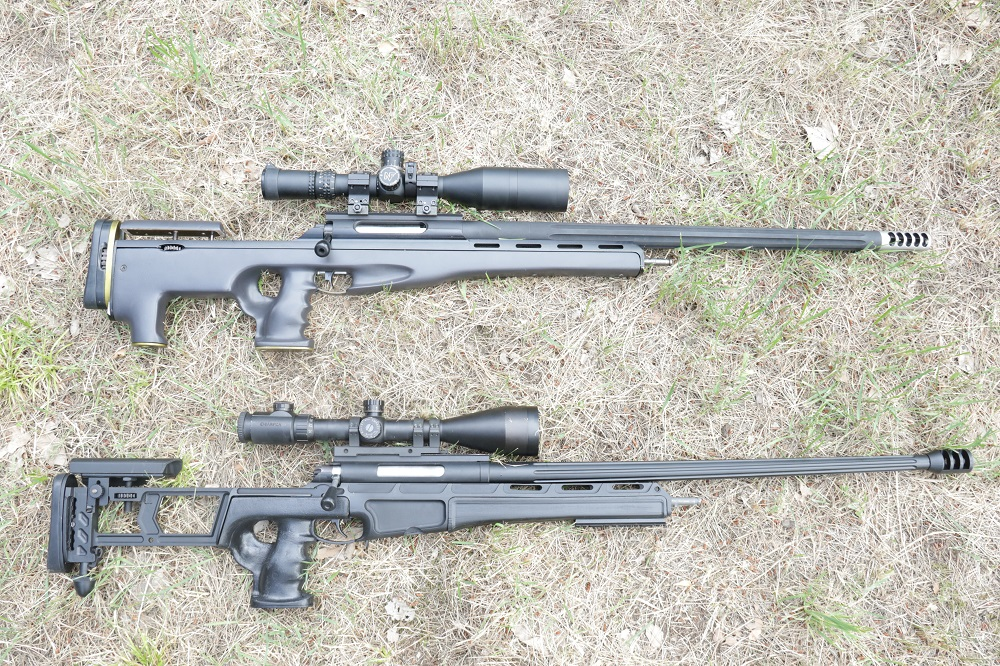
satevari sniper rifles

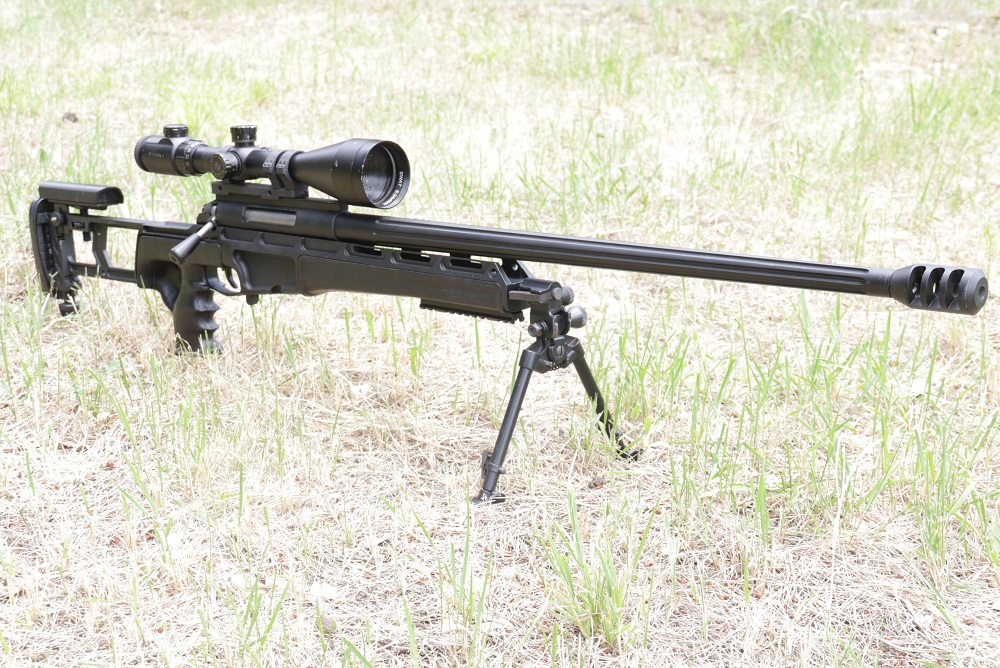
satevari-2 sniper rifle

The Satevari (Georgian: სატევარი translated as "Dagger" ) MSWP is a proposed multi-caliber modular sniper rifle platform developed by STC Delta intended primarily for military but also limited civilian use. It was designed as convertible precision sniper rifle able to maintain high accuracy over long ranges and maximum effective ranges accordingly to cartridge and corresponding conversion.

== Design ==
The rifle is equipped with an adjustable stock with integrated monopod in support of more stability and accuracy while shooting. A special ergonomic and orthopedic grip was installed in order to provide comfort by reducing the muscle strain of the user hand to a minimum. Active-reactive muzzle breaks reduce overall recoil. The base design can be further altered and modified

== Modularity ==
The rifle design allows a multi-caliber setup with yet unspecified details. A total of 7 cartridge types can be fired with the weapon, ranging from .308 Win to .50 BMG giving it penetration capabilities against both soft and lightly armoured targets.

== Accuracy ==
The designer states an overall accuracy of 0.3 MOA field tested with bipod. Fixed may be more accurate.

== Designation ==
The name "Satevari" comes from a type of ceremonial Georgian dagger which is carried together with a traditional national dress called Chokha. The specific designation may be an implication as to the rifle's accuracy.

== See also ==
- List of sniper rifles
- Remington MSR
- Sako TRG
- M24 Sniper Weapon System
- KSVK 12.7
- OSV-96
- OM 50 Nemesis
- Barrett M95
- Zastava M93
- Zastava M12 Black Spear
