= List of bullpup firearms =

The following is a list of firearms designed in a bullpup configuration – with the firing grip located in front of the breech of the weapon, instead of behind it.

Name	Manufacturer	Image	Cartridge	Country	Year
A-91	KBP Instrument Design Bureau		5.45×39mm 5.56×45mm	Russia	1990
ADS amphibious rifle	TsKIB SOO		5.45×39mm	Russia	2007
AICW	DSTO; Metal Storm; Tenix Defence		5.56×45mm 40mm superposed grenades	Australia	2005 (Prototype)
AGM-1 carbine	AL.GI.MEC.Srl		9×19mm Parabellum.45 ACP.22 LR	Italy	1980s
ALSETEX Cougar MS	SAE ALSETEX		40x46mm	France	2014
Arash anti-materiel rifle			20×102mm HEI	Iran	2013
Armtech C30R	Armtech Pty Ltd		5.56×45mm	Australia	1986
Barrett M82A2	Barrett Firearms Manufacturing		.50 BMG	United States	1980
Barrett M90	Barrett Firearms Manufacturing		.50 BMG	United States	1990
Barrett M95	Barrett Firearms Manufacturing		.50 BMG	United States	1995
Barrett M99	Barrett Firearms Manufacturing		.416 Barrett.50 BMG	United States	1999
Barrett XM500	Barrett Firearms Manufacturing		.50 BMG	United States	2006
Bond Arms BullPup 9	Bond Arms		9x19mm Parabellum	United States	2017
Bor rifle	Zakłady Mechaniczne Tarnów		7.62×51mm NATO.338 Lapua Magnum	Poland	2005
BR18	ST Kinetics		5.56×45mm NATO	Singapore	2012–14 (Prototypes) 2018 (Production models)
Burney rifle	Broadway Trust		.27 Broadway Trust	United Kingdom	1944
Bushmaster Arm Pistol	Gwinn Firearms		5.56×45mm	United States	1977
Bushmaster M17S	Bushmaster Firearms International		5.56×45mm	Australia	1992
Crye Six12	Crye Precision		12 gauge	United States	2014
Cook automatic rifle	Benicia Armory		.30-06 Springfield	United States	1950s
Desert Tech MDR	Desert Tech		.223 Remington; 5.56×45mm.223 Wylde.308 Win; 7.62×51mm	United States	2014
Desert Tech MDRx	Desert Tech		.223 Remington; 5.56×45mm.223 Wylde.300 BLK.308 Win; 7.62×51mm 6.5mm Creedmoor.350 Legend.450 Bushmaster	United States	2020
Desert Tech HTI	Desert Tech		.375 Cheyenne Tactical.408 Cheyenne Tactical.416 Barrett.50 BMG	United States	2012
Desert Tech SRS	Desert Tech		.243 Winchester; 7.62×51mm.300 Winchester Magnum.338 Lapua Magnum	United States	2008
Desert Tech WLVRN	Desert Tech		.223 Remington; 5.56×45mm.223 Wylde.300 BLK.308 Win; 7.62×51mm 6.5mm Creedmoor	United States	2024
Dragunov SVU	Central Design Research Bureau of Sporting and Hunting Arms		7.62×54mmR	Russia	1994
DSR-Precision GmbH DSR-1	DSR-precision GmbH		.308 Winchester.300 Winchester Magnum.338 Lapua Magnum	Germany	2000
DSR-50	DSR-precision GmbH		.50 BMG	Germany	2000
EM-2 rifle	Royal Small Arms Factory		6.25×43mm 7.92x33mm Kurz.280 (7 mm Mk1Z); 7.62×51mm	United Kingdom	1948
EMER-K1	EMEC		5.56×45mm NATO	Myanmar	1995
FAMAS	Manufacture d'armes de Saint-Étienne & Nexter		5.56×45mm	France	1975
Falcon	Zbrojovka Vsetín Inc.		12.7×108mm.50 BMG	Czech Republic	1998
FN F2000	FN Herstal		5.56×45mm	Belgium	2001
FN P90	FN Herstal		FN 5.7×28mm	Belgium	1990
Fusil Automático Doble	SIMA Electronic		5.56×45mm	Peru	2008
Gepard anti-materiel rifle	SERO Ltd		12.7×108mm.50 BMG; 14.5×114mm	Hungary	1990
Heckler & Koch G11	Heckler & Koch		4.73×33mm caseless ammunition 4.7×2mm 4.3mm 4.9mm 4.73×25mm caseless ammunition	West Germany	1968
Heckler & Koch HK CAWS	Heckler & Koch		12 gauge	West Germany	1980's
High Standard Model 10	High Standard Manufacturing Company		12 gauge	United States	1950s
HS Produkt VHS	HS Produkt		5.56×45mm	Croatia	2005
INSAS Bullpup (prototype)	Armament Research and Development Establishment		5.56×45mm	India	2019
IFAR 22	PT Republik Armamen Industri		5.56×45mm	INA	2022
Interdynamics MKR	Interdynamics AB		4.5×26mm MKR	Sweden	1980s
Tavor TAR-21	Israel Weapon Industries		5.56×45mm 9×19mm Parabellum; 5.56×30mm MINSAS; 5.45×39mm	Israel	1995
Tavor X95	Israel Weapon Industries		5.56×45mm 5.45×39mm.300 AAC Blackout; 9×19mm Parabellum; 5.56×30mm MINSAS	Israel	2003
Tavor 7	Israel Weapon Industries		7.62×51mm(.308 Winchester)	Israel	2013
JS 9 mm	China South Industries Group		9×19mm DAP92-9; 9×19mm Parabellum	China	2006
K-3 (rifle)	Garni-ler		5.45×39mm	Armenian SSR (now Armenia)	1990s
KAL1 general purpose infantry rifle	Small Arms Factory Lithgow		7.62×51mm	Australia	1970
Kbk wz. 2002 BIN			5.56×45mm	Poland	2002
KEPPELER KS Bullpup Sniper	KEPPELER Germany		7.62×51mm.308 Win.300 Win Mag.338 Lapua	Germany	2002
M17S556	K&M ARMS		.223 Remington; 5.56×45mm	United States	2014 – current
Kel-Tec KSG	Kel-Tec CNC Industries		12 gauge	United States	2011
Kel-Tec KS7	Kel-Tec CNC Industries		12 gauge	United States	2019
Kel-Tec RFB	Kel-Tec CNC Industries		7.62×51mm	United States	2003
Kel-Tec RDB	Kel-Tec CNC Industries		5.56×45mm	United States	2014
Kel-Tec RDB Hunter (Previously RDB-C)	Kel-Tec CNC Industries		5.56×45mm	United States	2016
Kel-Tec RDB Survival (Previously RDB-S)	Kel-Tec CNC Industries		5.56×45mm NATO	United States	2018
KH-2002	Defense Industries Organization		5.56×45mm	Iran	2001
Konstantinov SA-1	ZiD/Degtyarev Plant		7.62x39mm	Soviet Union	1963
KSVK 12.7	Degtyarev plant		12.7×108mm	Russia	1997
L64/65	Royal Small Arms Factory		4.85×49mm	United Kingdom	1964
L85	BAE Systems		5.56×45mm	United Kingdom	1987
L86	BAE Systems		5.56×45mm	United Kingdom	1987
LAPA FA-03	Laboratorio de Pesquisa de Armamento Automatico		5.56×45mm (non-standard 55-grains M193 "Ball" cartridge)	Brazil	1970s
M89SR	Technical Equipment International		7.62×51mm NATO	Israel	1980s
Magpul PDR	Magpul Industries		5.56×45mm	United States	2012
Mambi AMR			14.5×114mm	Cuba	1980s
Model 45A			.30-06 Springfield	United States; Philippines	1945
MSBS-5.56B	FB "Łucznik" Radom		5.56×45mm	Poland	2017
Malyuk	Ukroboronprom		5.56×45mm 5.45×39mm 7.62×39mm	Ukraine	2015
NeoStead 2000	Truvelo Armoury		12 gauge	South Africa	1991
Norinco Type 86S	China North Industries Corporation		7.62×39mm	China	1980s
OTs-14 Groza	Tula Arms Plant		9×39mm 7.62×39mm	Russia	1990s
Pancor Jackhammer	Pancor Corporation		12 gauge	United States	1984
Panzerbüchse M.SS41	Brno		7.92×94mm Patronen	Nazi Germany; Protectorate of Bohemia and Moravia	1941
PAPOP	GIAT Industries		5.56×45mm	France	1995
PDSHP-1	STC Delta		12.7×108mm 14.5×114mm	Georgia	2012
PDSHP-2	STC Delta		12.7×108mm	Georgia	2012
Pindad SS Bullpup	Pindad		5.56×45mm	IDN	2005
QBB-95	China North Industries Corporation		5.8×42mm DBP87	China	1995
QBU-88	China North Industries Corporation		5.8×42mm DBP87; 5.56×45mm NATO	China	1990s
QBZ-95/97 T97NSR	China North Industries Corporation		5.8×42mm DBP87; 5.56×45mm	China	1995
QCW-05	China South Industries Group		5.8×21mm DCV05	China	2001
Remington XP-100	Remington Arms Company		.221 Fireball.22-250 Remington.223 Remington.250 Savage; 6 mm BR Remington; 7 mm BR Remington; 7 mm-08 Remington.308 Winchester.35 Remington	United States	1963
RM277 NGSW-AR	LoneStar Future Weapons		.277 Fury	United States	2019
RT-20 (rifle)	Metallic		20×110mm	Croatia	1994
S&T Daewoo K11	S&T Motiv		5.56×45mm 20×30mm grenade	South Korea	2000
S&T Daewoo XK8	S&T Motiv		5.56×45mm	South Korea	2000s
S&W M&P 12	Smith&Wesson		12 Gauge	United States	2010s
SAR 21	ST Kinetics		5.56×45mm	Singapore	1996
Savage Striker	Savage Arms		.22 long rifle.22 Winchester Magnum Rimfire.223 Remington.22-250 Remington.243 Winchester; 7mm-08 Remington.260 Remington.308 Winchester; 7mm Winchester Short Magnum.300 Winchester Short Magnum	United States	1999
ShAK-12	Izhmash		12.7×55mm	Russia	2010
Sieg automatic rifle			.30-06 Springfield	United States	1946
SP-50	Liberty Arms Manufacturing		.50 BMG	United States	1990s
Special Purpose Individual Weapon			12 gauge flechette XM110 5.6×53mm (Project SALVO)	United States	1980s
Standard Manufacturing DP-12	Standard Manufacturing		12 gauge	United States	2015
Steyr ACR	Steyr Mannlicher		5.56×45mm annular-primed SCF (synthetic case flechette)	Austria	1987
Steyr AUG	Steyr Mannlicher		5.56×45mm 9×19mm Parabellum	Austria	1970s
Steyr IWS 2000	Steyr Mannlicher		14.5mm 15.2×169mm	Austria	1980s
STG-556	Microtech Small Arms Research		5.56×45mm.223 Remington; 6.8mm Remington SPC	United States	2007
SV-18	Kalashnikov Concern		.50 BMG; 12.7×108mm	Russia	2019
T-AB 1A	Maktes Arms		5.56x45mm 5.45x39mm 7.62x39mm	Armenia	2025
Thorneycroft carbine			.303 British	United Kingdom	1901
TKB-408	Tula Arms Plant		7.62×39mm	Soviet Union	1946
TKB-022PM	Tula Arms Plant		7.62×39mm 5.6×39mm	Soviet Union	1960s
TKB-059	Tula Arms Plant		7.62×39mm M43	Soviet Union	1962
TKB-011 2M	Tula Arms Plant		7.62×39mm	Soviet Union	1965
TKB-0146	Tula Arms Plant		5.45×39mm	Soviet Union	1984
Urutau			9x19mm Parabellum	Brazil	2024
USFA ZiP .22	U.S. Fire Arms Manufacturing Company		.22 LR	United States	2013–2014
UTAS UTS-15	UTAS		12 gauge	Turkey	2006
Valmet M82	Valmet		5.56×45mm 7.62×39mm	Finland	1978
VB Berapi LP06	VB Berapi		5.56×45mm	Malaysia	2006
Vektor CR-21	Denel Land Systems		5.56×45mm	South Africa	1997
Vepr	National Space Agency of Ukraine		5.45×39mm	Ukraine	2001
VKS sniper rifle	Central Design Bureau of Sporting and Hunting Weapons		12.7×55mm STs-130	Russia	2002
VS-121	Kalashnikov Concern		7.62×54mmR	Russia	2011
VSK-100BP	BSVT – New Technologies LLC		7.62×39mm	Belarus	2019
Walther G22	Walther arms		.22 LR	Germany	2004
Walther WA 2000	Walther arms		7.62×51mm.300 Winchester Magnum; 7.5×55mm Swiss	West Germany	1970s
WKW Wilk	Zakłady Mechaniczne Tarnów		.50 BMG	Poland	2000
XM25 CDTE	Heckler & Koch; Orbital ATK		25×40mm	US; GER	2010
XM29 OICW	Heckler & Koch; Alliant Techsystems		5.56×45mm 20×85mm	US; GER	1996
MBAR	Atlas Engineering Templar Precision		.223 Remington; 5.56×45mm.223 Wylde.300 BLK.308 Win; 7.62×51mm 6.5mm Creedmoor.350 Legend.450 Bushmaster	United States	2024–2026 (Prototypes)

== See also ==
- Automatic shotgun
- Combat shotgun
- List of combat shotguns
- List of multiple-barrel firearms
- List of revolvers
- List of rifles
- List of semi-automatic shotguns
- Riot shotgun
- Semi-automatic shotgun
