= Barrett XM500 =

- Type: Bullpup anti materiel/sniper rifle
- Place of origin: United States

Production history
- Designed: 2006
- Manufacturer: Barrett Firearms Manufacturing

Specifications
- Mass: 26 lb (12 kg)
- Length: 46 in (120 cm)
- Cartridge: .50 BMG
- Action: Gas-operated, rotating bolt
- Feed system: 10-round detachable box magazine
- Sights: None

The Barrett XM500 is a gas-operated, semi-automatic, anti materiel/sniper rifle in development by the Barrett Firearms Company as of 2010. It is fed by a 10-round detachable box magazine situated behind the trigger in bullpup configuration.

Based on the design of the Barrett M82/M107, it is intended to be a lighter, more compact alternative. Since the XM500 has a stationary barrel (instead of the recoiling-barrel design of the M82), it will likely have somewhat better accuracy. As with its predecessor, it comes with a removable, adjustable bipod mounted under the barrel, and a top-mounted Picatinny rail for attachment of a scope or other accessory. As of 2026 January, there is no publicly available evidence the weapon is actively manufactured.

== See also ==
- List of bullpup firearms
- List of sniper rifles
- Barrett M95 – (United States)
- Barrett XM109 – (United States)
- Dragunov SVU – (Russia)
- Gepard GM6 Lynx – (Hungary)
- MACS M3 – (Croatia)
- OSV-96 – (Russia)
