= WKW Tor =

Polish anti-materiel rifle

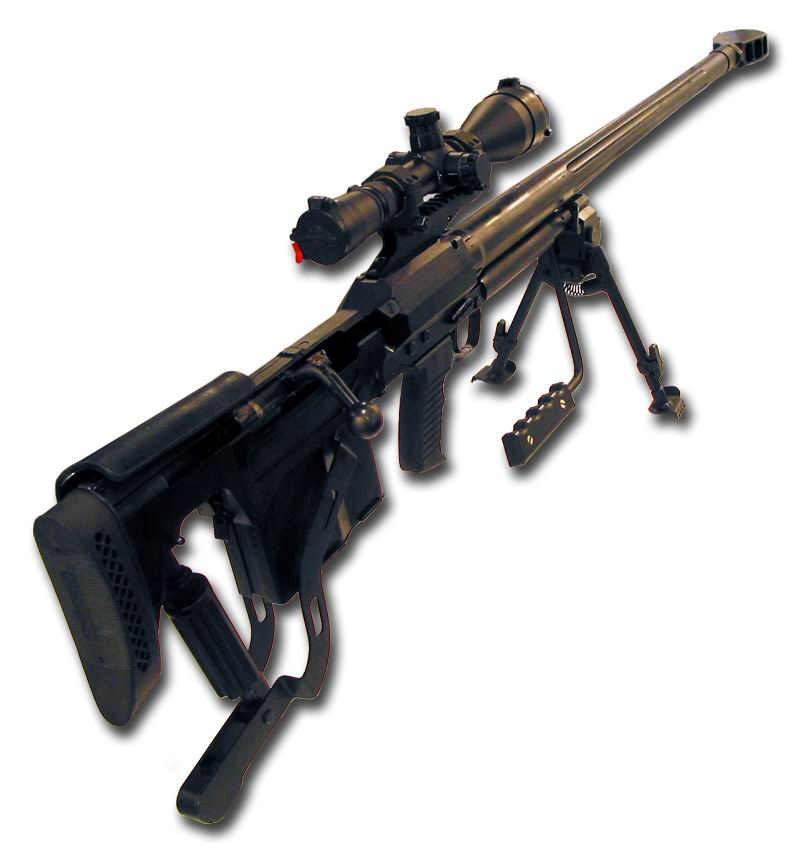
- The WKW Tor with a bipod attached
- Type: Bullpup anti-materiel rifle and sniper rifle
- Place of origin: Poland

Service history
- In service: 2005–present
- Used by: See Users
- Wars: War in Afghanistan (2001–2021); Russo-Ukrainian War: Russian Invasion of Ukraine

Production history
- Designer: Zakłady Mechaniczne Tarnów
- Designed: 2000
- Produced: 2005–present
- No. built: Ca. 150

Specifications
- Mass: 16.1 kg
- Length: 1,350 mm
- Barrel length: 880 mm
- Cartridge: .50 BMG
- Action: Manually operated rotary Bolt action
- Muzzle velocity: 2,895 ft/s (882 m/s) from 800gr Barnes
- Effective firing range: Max effective range is 3,000 m
- Feed system: 7-round detachable box magazine
- Sights: None

The WKW Tor (Thorium) or previously WKW Wilk (Wolf) is a modern anti-materiel and/or sniper rifle produced in Poland by the Zakłady Mechaniczne Tarnów. The abbreviation "WKW" stands for Wielkokalibrowy Karabin Wyborowy or Large Caliber Sniper Rifle. The rifle was initially given the working name Wilk, but after completion of development it was given the final name Tor. This rifle was developed between 2000 and 2004 and the first selected units in the Polish army apparently received Tor rifles in around 2005 onwards.

The WKW Tor uses a manually operated rotary bolt action weapon of bull-pup layout. It is fed from detachable box magazines and is fitted with a folding and adjustable bipod and an adjustable rear monopod. Standard sighting equipment is a Schmidt & Bender X3−12 P/MII telescope sight which is placed on Picatinny rails above the receiver.

== Gallery ==
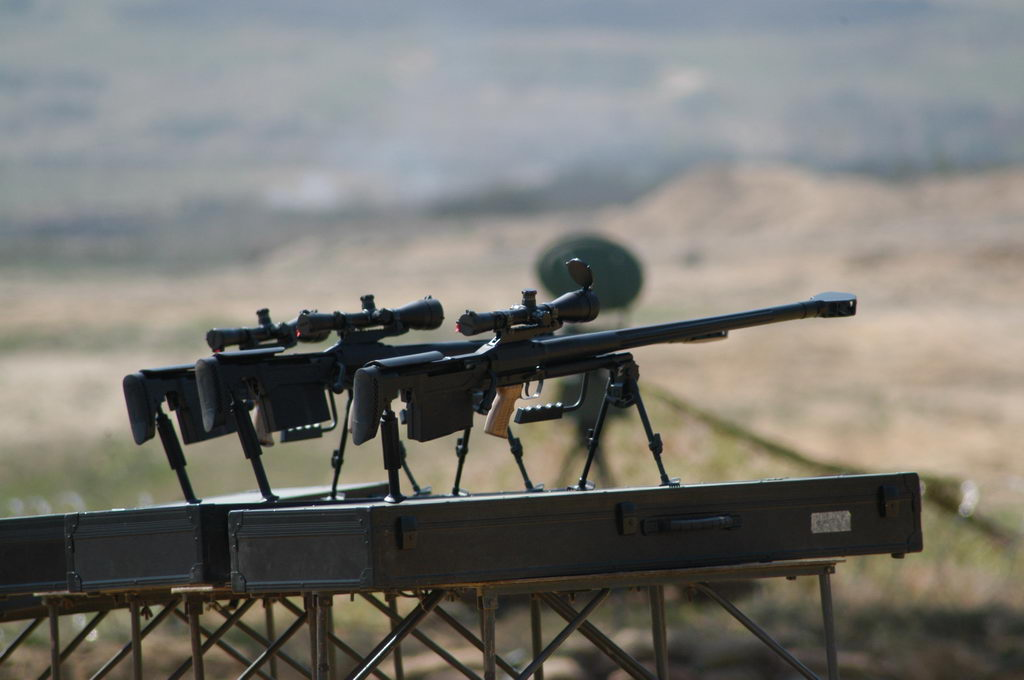
Three Tors 12.7 mm in a shooting range

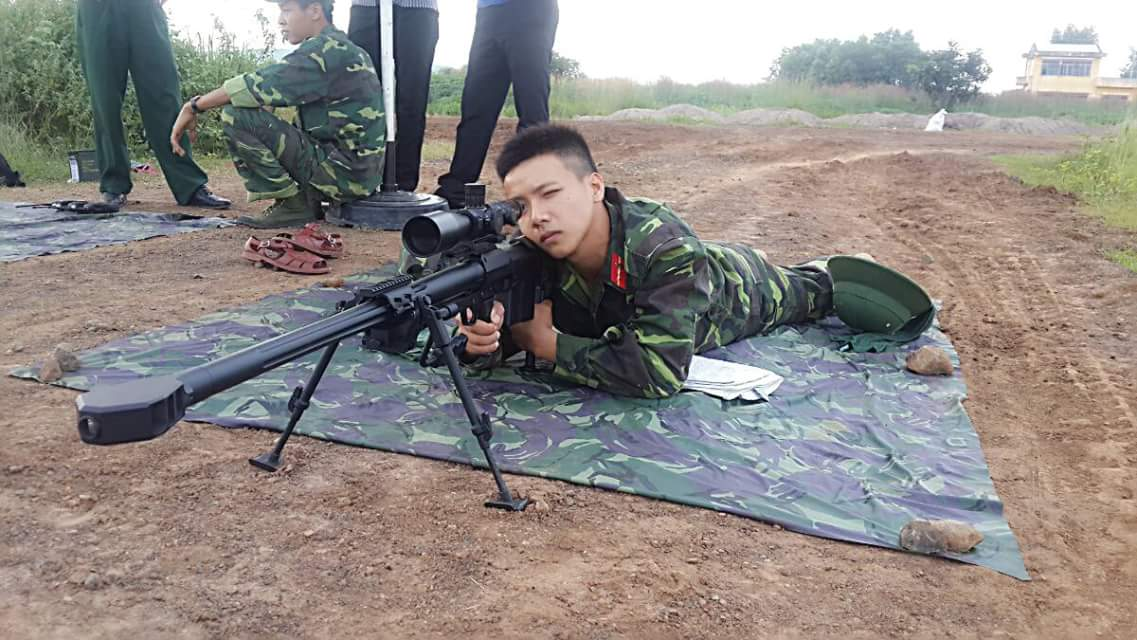
Vietnamese soldier shooting with WKW Tor

== Users ==
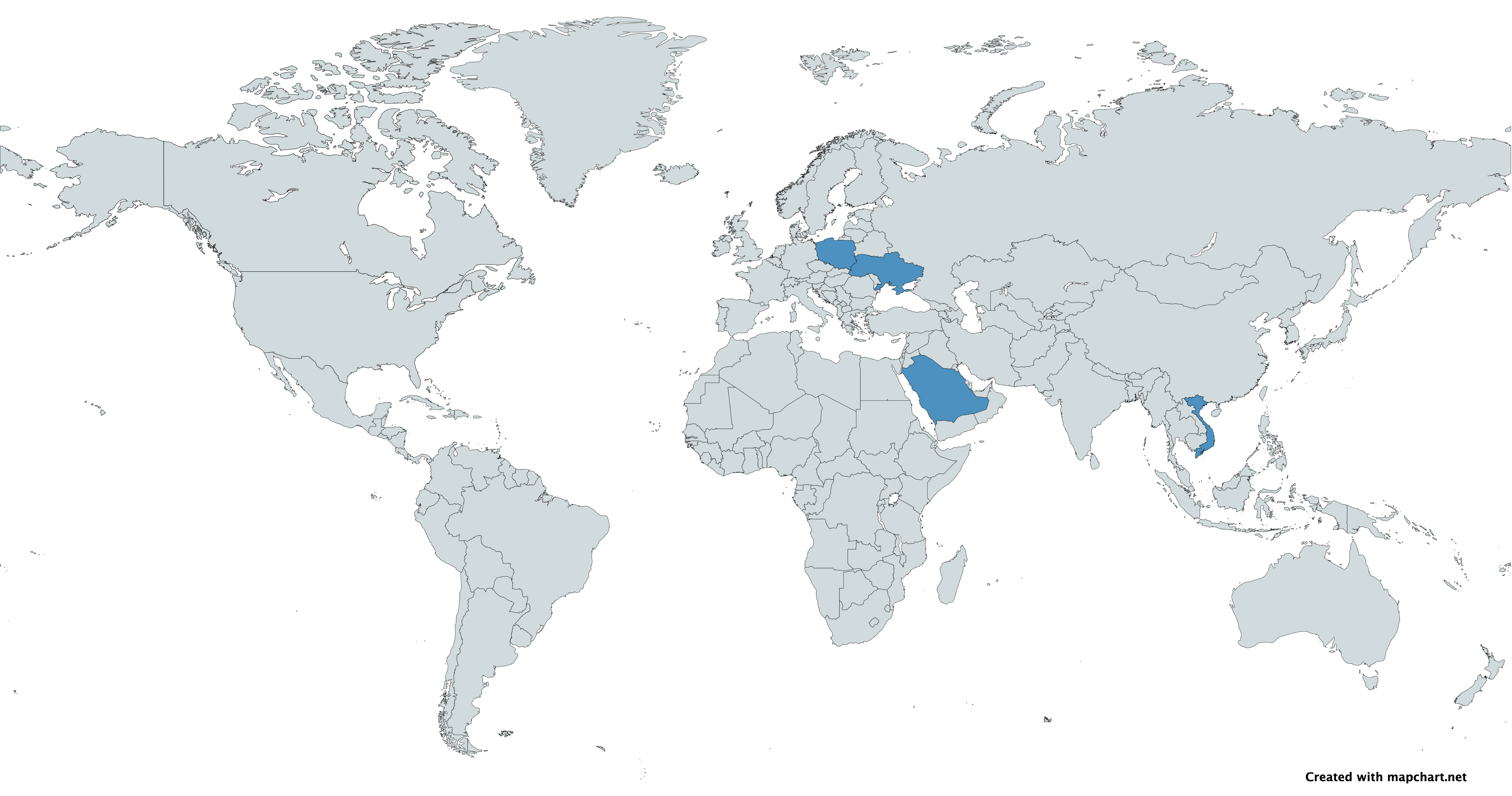
Map with WKW Tor users in blue

- Poland: Ca. 80 units bought.
- Saudi Arabia: Ca. 15 units bought.
- Ukraine: Unknown amount donated by Poland.
- Vietnam: Ca. 50 units bought.

== See also ==
- List of bullpup firearms
- List of sniper rifles
- AMP Technical Services DSR-50 – (Germany)
- Barrett M95 – (United States)
- Gepard – (Hungary)
- KSVK – (Russia)
- ZVI Falcon – (Czech Republic)
