= MICOR Leader 50 =

- Type: Bullpup sniper rifle
- Place of origin: United States

Production history
- Designer: Charles St. George
- Manufacturer: MICOR Defence
- Unit cost: $6800.00
- Produced: 2012–present

Specifications
- Mass: 17 lbs (without magazine)
- Length: 39" (with 24" barrel)
- Cartridge: .50 BMG
- Cartridge weight: 650 to 1200 grains
- Caliber: .50
- Barrels: 24"
- Action: Annular short-stroke gas piston
- Effective firing range: Approximately 1600 yards
- Maximum firing range: Approximately 2000 yards (roughly 1 mile)
- Feed system: 10-round detachable box magazine
- Sights: None (M1913 Picatinny Rail for user-supplied sight)

The MICOR Leader 50 is a heavy semi-automatic sniper rifle of US origin. The weapon has a bullpup layout.

== See also ==
- List of bullpup firearms
- List of sniper rifles
- Anti-materiel rifle
- Raufoss Mk211
- Barrett XM500
