= WKW =

WKW may refer to:

- Wer-kennt-wen, popular German social networking site
- WKW Wilk, modern sniper rifle
- Wong Kar-wai (born 1958), Chinese film director
- Wee Kim Wee (1915–2005), fourth president of Singapore
