= List of equipment of the Zerevani =

List of some of the equipment, which is being used by the Kurdistan Region's gendarmerie, the Zerevani.

== Current equipment ==
=== Small arms ===
Infantry rifles
Weapon Name	Picture	Origin	Number	Note
M16		USA	Unknown	
M4A1		USA	Unknown	
AK-12		Russia	Unknown	
FAMAS G2		France	Unknown	
Barrett M82		USA	Unknown	
M-24 sniper rifle		USA	Unknown	
Dragunov SVU		Russia	Unknown	
Zastava M91		Yugoslavia	Unknown	
PSG-1		West Germany		

=== Anti-tank weapons ===
Weapon Name	Picture	Note
RPG-7		
RPG-29		
AT4		
9K111 Fagot		
Panzerfaust 3		

=== Combat vehicles ===
Vehicles
Vehicle Name	Picture	Origin	Quantity	Notes
T-62		Soviet Union	116	116 tanks captured from Mosul in 2003.
T-54/T-55		Soviet Union	132	121 tanks captured from the Iraqi Army in 1991 and 27 tanks captured from the Iraqi Army in 2003. 8 tanks destroyed during the 1990s and 6 tanks destroyed in the fight against ISIS
GAZ-66				
Humvee				Zerevani forces currently have 3000+ Humvees.
Toyota Hilux				
LMTV				
Toyota Land Cruiser Pickup				Known as "Mig Zamin" within the Peshmerga Forces.
Nissan Titan				
Defender-110				

Anti-aircraft guns

Name	Picture	Note
ZU-23-2		16 pieces captured from Iraqi Army in 1991 and 5 were given by Russia in 2016.
85 mm air defense gun M1939 (52-K)		10 pieces inherited from the Republic of Kurdistan and 18 further pieces donated by the Soviet Union in 1961–62.
AZP S-60		12 pieces donated by the Soviet Union in 1957 and 1963, 18 pieces captured from Iraqi Army in 1991 and 24 pieces in 2003.
ZSU-23-4		21 pieces captured from Iraqi Army in 2003.
