= Grot 762N =

Polish semi-automatic designated marksman rifle

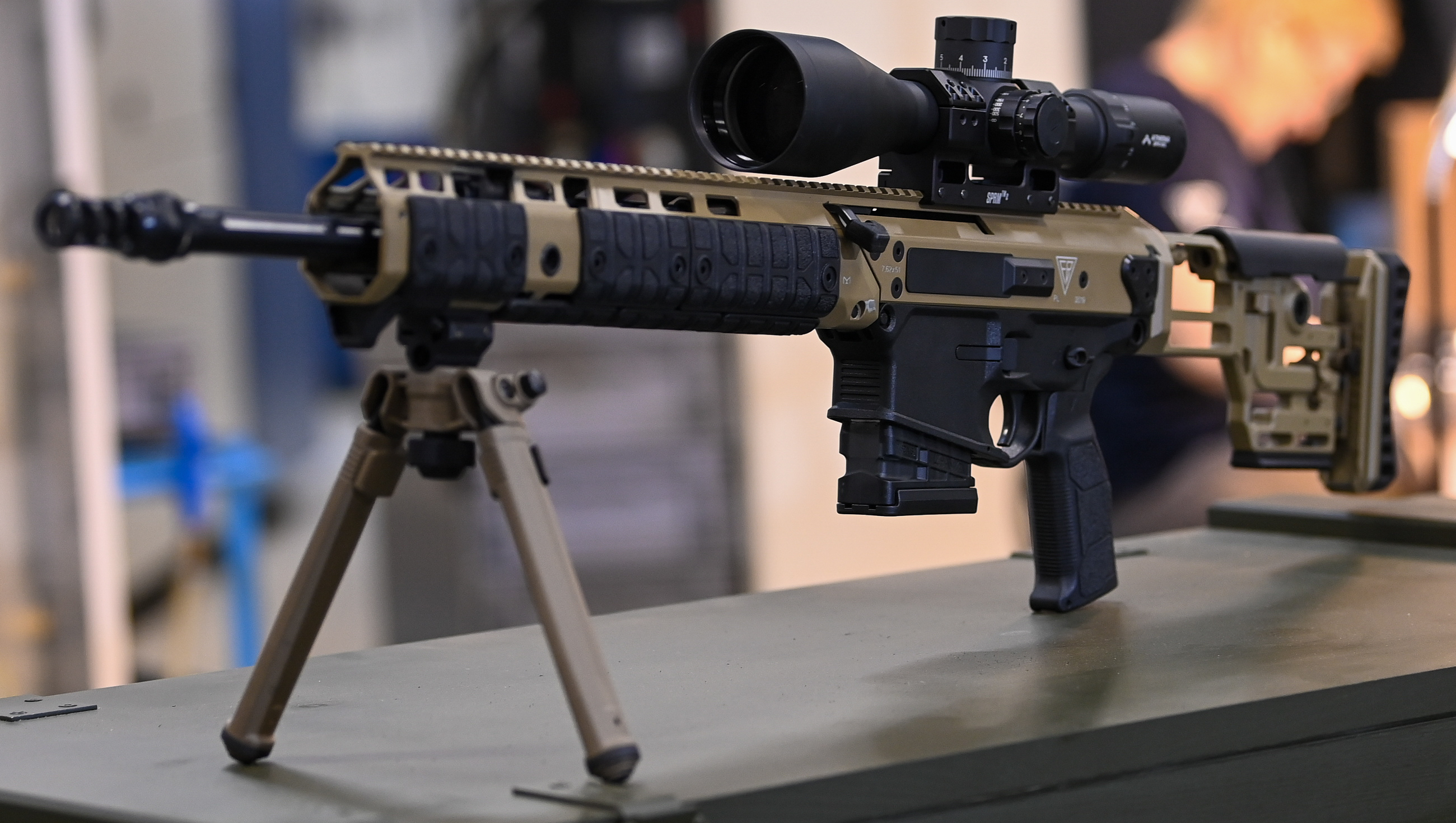
- Grot 762N with a bipod and telescopic sight
- Type: Designated marksman rifle
- Place of origin: Poland

Production history
- Manufacturer: FB Radom

Specifications
- Mass: 5.2–6 kg (11–13 lb)
- Barrel length: 406 mm (16.0 in); 508 mm (20.0 in)
- Cartridge: 7.62×51mm NATO
- Action: Short-stroke gas piston, rotating bolt
- Feed system: 20-round detachable SR-25 magazines
- Sights: Integrated Picatinny rail for various optical sights and Picatinny attachable iron sights

The Grot 762N is a Polish semi-automatic designated marksman rifle chambered in 7.62×51mm NATO cartridge, developed from the FB MSBS Grot.

== History ==
The MSBS-7.62N project began in the end of 2015 when Polish Military of Defence announced analytical works for the replacement program of their Dragunov sniper rifle and supplement the bolt-action TRG-22 and Tor sniper rifles currently in service. It was led by the team of Fabryka Broni Łucznik-Radom and Wojskowa Techniczna (WAT) engineers.

== Design details ==
The Grot 7.62N has two different configurations; one with a 508 mm (20 in) barrel with a fixed adjustable stock and the other with 406 mm (16 in) barrel with the MSBS Grot C's adjustable side-folding stock. Both configurations are part of the MSBS family and some of the parts of the Grot 762N, such as the stock, handguard, pistol grip, and trigger are interchangeable between 5.56mm and 7.62mm models.

The Grot 7.62N is designed as a semi-automatic rifle but project engineers declared that a fully automatic configuration can be developed if required.

== Users ==
- Poland
