= VB Berapi LP06 =

Malaysian assault rifle

- Type: Bullpup assault rifle
- Place of origin: Malaysia

Production history
- Designer: Viktor Prykhodko
- Designed: 2006
- Manufacturer: Vita Berapi
- Variants: Prototype

Specifications
- Length: 587 mm (23.1 in)
- Barrel length: 400 mm (16 in)
- Cartridge: 5.56×45mm NATO
- Caliber: 5.56mm
- Maximum firing range: 600 m (2,000 ft)
- Feed system: 30-round detachable box magazine
- Sights: Iron sight / Optical sight

The VB Berapi LP06 is the first assault rifle designed and manufactured by Malaysia, and is not related to any previously licensed assault rifles made by VB Berapi. The LP06 is a bullpup assault rifle. It is chambered in the 5.56×45mm NATO round and is fed from a 30-round magazine. Hisham Abd Majid, the director of Vita Berapi in 2006, said that the rifle is designed by Viktor Prykhodko (Russian: Виктор Приходько), a Russian residing in Malaysia.

== See also ==
- List of bullpup firearms
- List of assault rifles
