= Iver Johnson AMAC-1500 =

Iver Johnson AMAC 1500/5100
- Type: Anti-material rifle Sniper rifle
- Place of origin: United States

Production history
- Designed: 1981–1982
- Manufacturer: Iver Johnson Arms

Specifications
- Length: 51.5 in (131 cm)
- Barrel length: 29 in (73.7 cm)
- Cartridge: .50 BMG
- Action: Manually-operated, rotating bolt

The Iver Johnson AMAC-1500/5100 (aka RAP Model 500 or aka RAI 500 or, depending on source, 'AMAC-1500' or 'AMAC-5100') is a 36 lb manually operated single-shot sniper rifle/anti-material rifle. The 29" barrel with a massive 7" two-stage muzzle brake on its end (barrel plus muzzle brake OAL of 36") has a 1 in 14" twist rifling rate, an adjustable crisp trigger pull between 3 lbs - 8 lbs, an adjustable stock length of pull between 13.75" to 15.5," and a stock comb adjustable to +1.5" for operator tuning. The rifle featured a removable "shell holder" rotating bolt with three lugs. For each shot, the removable bolt was rotated and removed from the receiver, then a cartridge was inserted into a half-circular retaining ridge breech bolt face, and then bolt with cartridge were inserted back into receiver and locked closed prior to firing pin cocking and firing. As such, there is no 'safety' once the bolt is engaged with a live round other than counter-rotating the bolt from the locked position. The rifle does not have any integral open sights as only telescopic sights were intended to be used. The integral receiver dove-tail rail with cross-key is set up for a scope mount with fixed ring spacing and 60 min of angle elevation. The rifle was not designed to be fired offhand, and thus had no forearm; instead, each rifle was issued with integral stout folding bipod attached to the receiver that allowed harmonic tuning adjustment in the bipod tube. For carry, rifle was easily disassembled into several major parts. There are several variants that also have larger calibers for this same design.

== Design and background ==
The Iver Johnson AMAC-1500/5100 is a derivative of the RAP Model 500, which was originally designed by a team led by Jerry Haskins of Research Armaments Prototypes (RAP, or RAI [incorporated]) (Jacksonville, Arkansas) as the Model 500 in 1981 at the request of US Armed Forces (SOCOM not created until April 16, 1987). Jerry Haskins formerly worked with Doug Champlin of Champlin Firearms but left to form his own company in 1971 (name confusion lists D. Haskins as the creator which was a misnomer of Champlin's first initial and Haskins last name). Both weapons are similar; the main differences are the barrel shape, the muzzle brake, and the bipod. Subsequently, the design was purchased by Daisy Weapon Systems (Rogers, Arkansas) who sold the AMAC 1500/5100 manufacturing rights to Iver Johnson Arms. Daisy continued development of the larger caliber M600 and M650 variants eventually selling off these designs to Redick Arms Development (R.A.D.) in 1990. As a note, Iver Johnson's Arms & Cycle Works is a company that originally started in 1891 (Fitchburg, Massachusetts) and bears no relation, besides the namesake, to the Iver Johnson Arms of this instance, which was purchased as a name right in 1973 by Louis Imperato, of Middlesex, New Jersey, from the original Iver Johnson company (future creator and owner of Henry Repeating Arms created in 1998, Brooklyn New York). Louis Imperato moved Iver Johnson from its long time original Fitchburg, Massachusetts location to Middlesex, New Jersey in 1977 (Ibid.). After restructuring, Louis Imperato then sold the Iver Johnson brand to a group of eight investors in Jacksonville, Arkansas headed by former business partner Philip Lynn Lloyd in 1982. Lloyd and his investors acquired the Iver Johnson branding from Louis Imperato for an amount to be paid over time with Iver Johnson operations moving to 2202 Redmond Road, Jacksonville, Arkansas in 1983. Rifles were constructed in small numbers (hundreds) and implemented by the US Armed Forces that same year in 1983 for deployment in Beirut, Panama, Grenada, and later Serbia/Bosnia.

== Naming variants and company controversy ==
Initial military delivery for 125 rifles was not sufficient to keep Iver Johnson operational and Phillip Lynn Lloyd and investors looked to other means of business to pay former owner, Louis Imperato, his due for the Iver Johnson branding. One of several events that caused Iver Johnson to file for bankruptcy in October 1986 was an import deal involving 43,500 Australian Enfield rifles that had arrived seriously damaged to the chagrin of Phillip Lynn Lloyd and investors. This situation was one of the final straws that forced the Iver Johnson company, under Lloyd and investors, to file for Chapter 11 bankruptcy protection in October 1986 in Federal Court (Little Rock, Arkansas). While operations continued at Iver Johnson's Arms at their Jacksonville, Arkansas location during their Chapter 11 Bankruptcy, the money owed Louis Imperato by Phillip Lynn Lloyd and others led to the return of the company to Louis Imperato under controversial conditions. At the completion of the bankruptcy proceedings, Iver Johnson company equipment was then set by the court to be sold at auction to satisfy creditor claims, the biggest creditor being Louis Imperato, himself. The historical controversy centers on, Iver Johnson's previous owner Louis Imperato, then re-purchasing his former company's assets, set for auction sale from the bankruptcy court, for $1.2 million, as he was the first creditor to be satisfied. Included in this bankruptcy court transaction were all the damaged Australian Enfield parts (the ones Phillip Lynn Lloyd and investors had bought prior) when Louis Imperato re-acquired Iver Johnson, its branding, and equipment. This action led to a souring between him and his former business partner, Phillip Lynn Lloyd, and investors as it gave Louis Imperato the right also to collect the remaining balance of the court's determined final company's valuation which Lloyd and investors had never been able to pay in full since acquisition in 1982, four years prior. On February 2, 1987, Louis Imperato created and incorporated Australian Military Surplus Enfield Enterprises in Jacksonville, Arkansas which listed himself as the President, Vice-President, Secretary, and Treasurer with Glenn Barber acting as the registered agent for Louis Imperato's court re-acquired Iver Johnson company in Jacksonville, Arkansas. On company internal documents Louis Imperato identified AMAC as "American Military Arms Corporation" with Iver Johnson Arms being a division of AMAC. The name "American Military Arms Corporation" was not incorporated in Arkansas until September 11, 1989 when it was incorporated by another investor, Neal Paul Fisk (Mountain Home, Arkansas) effectively making Iver Johnson a division of AMAC, Inc. Louis Imperato managed Iver Johnson's Arms in Jacksonville, Arkansas from his office in Brooklyn, New York. However, Louis Imperato would have Iver Johnson declare bankruptcy again, not more than a year later, in 1990, at first as a Chapter 11 (intending to resume business), and then refile to a Chapter 7 (unable to restructure).

== Final disposition of the company and its rifle ==
As part of the final asset sell-off in bankruptcy court, Numrich Gun Parts acquired all of the M1 and Enfield parts. Redick Arms Development (aka incorrectly referenced as 'Redrick'; incorporated 1990, later sold in 1999 to Aurora Tactical, LLC [Springdale Arkansas]) by single owner Ron Witherspoon (Rogers, Arkansas, same as Daisy Weapon Systems), acquired some of the unsold AMAC 5100s as did Ramo Defense (incorporated 1977; defunct www.ramo.com website) located in Nashville, Tennessee. Later in 2003, other remaining unsold AMAC 5100 rifles were acquired by single owner of Ultimate Accuracy Arms, Darrell Reynolds (incorporated in 2003, Lonoke, Arkansas). Iver Johnson Arms branding, trademark, and other rights were acquired from the bankruptcy court by a Rockledge, Florida based company that began using the Iver Johnson name and Owl company logo in 2006. Their website plainly states that, “We do not have any parts, guns, or info related to the old Iver Johnson name (Ibid). Mr. Louis Imperato died in 2007 and his son, Anthony, moved the Henry Repeating Arms company to Bayonne, New Jersey in 2008.

== See also ==
- Barrett M82
- Barrett M95
- Barrett XM109
