= Barrett M90 =

- Type: Bullpup Anti materiel sniper rifle
- Place of origin: United States

Service history
- Used by: See Users
- Wars: The Troubles

Production history
- Designed: 1990
- Manufacturer: Barrett Firearms Company
- Produced: 1990-1995

Specifications
- Cartridge: .50 BMG
- Action: Bolt-action
- Feed system: 5-round detachable box magazine
- Sights: None

The Barrett M90 is a bolt-action, bullpup rifle chambered in .50 BMG (12.7×99mm NATO). It was designed and manufactured by Barrett Firearms Company. In 1995, Barrett stopped production of the M90, and replaced it with the M95.

== Summary ==
The M90 was designed and produced from 1990 to 1995 as a bolt-action alternative to the semi-automatic Barrett M82. It was a bolt-action rifle in a bullpup design. The weapon featured a fluted barrel with integrated muzzle brake, 2 part receiver (upper and lower), folding bipod, and a 5-round detachable box magazine. The M90 had no iron sights, but instead had a Picatinny rail for the mounting of a scope.

== Overview ==
The Barrett M90 is a BMG .50 caliber bolt-action rifle. The rifle was produced by Barrett Firearms Company in 1990 until 1995. The Barrett M90 is the alternative bolt-action version to the Barrett M82A1, which is the semi-automatic counterpart. The Barrett M90 has a bullpup design, making the rifle a more compact version of a BMG .50 caliber. The bullpup design made the gun more civilian-friendly in its usage. Barrett Firearms initially created the Barrett M90 to attract consumers who were seeking to find a bolt-action .50 caliber. Unlike the larger semi-automatic Barrett M82A1, the Barrett M90 is compact, has a fluted muzzle to reduce recoil, and has a special picatinny rail in order to mount a different variety of scopes. The Barrett M90, like other Barrett rifles, incorporates the picatinny rail instead of iron sights due its larger caliber. The gun was originally used for civilian long-range division shooters incorporating them into competition style shooting. The Barrett M90 is very light in comparison to the Barrett M82A1. This was due to its smaller, more compact design.

== Design and history ==
With its smaller design came more technological advancements in order to add to effectiveness and adaptation to the smaller design. The Barrett M90’s barrel has the same length as the Barrett M82A1. Due to it being a bolt-action rifle other than its semi-automatic counterpart, it uses three large lugs that are locked into the barrel to improve its overall sturdiness to handle a BMG .50 caliber round. The Barrett M90 uses a muzzle brake to redirect propellant gases to reduce recoil and rising of the gun during rapid firing. The gun has a two-chamber muzzle brake, same as the gun’s counterpart M82A1 and its future replacement, the Barrett M95. The Barrett M90 isn’t affected very much from rising due to it being a bolt action. Muzzle brakes are very effective in combat and competition use because it adds to the accuracy of the weapon.

The Barrett M90 uses a muzzle brake due to its high caliber as with any other high caliber gun as well, alongside artillery guns. The Barrett M90 is composed of stamped sheet steel to add to its durability and reduced weight. This reduces the number of parts going into the gun, making assembly and disassembly simpler. The gun is composed of two parts, upper and lower. The upper part is the top assembly of the weapon such as barrel and rail, and the lower is the handle and trigger mechanism. The upper and lower parts of the Barrett M90 are held together by very strong push pins. Due to the advancement in the bullpup design, the magazine is located in the stock of the weapon, adding to its more compact design.

The Barrett M90 has a much shallower magazine than the Barrett M82A1 and can only hold five rounds. This is due to the smaller design of the weapon. The handle and trigger mechanism is located just in front of the gun’s magazine. The butt of the gun is positioned directly to the receiver as well, increasing stability when firing. The gun uses a foldable bipod to add to accuracy and stability while firing. This also decreases the initial force of recoil from the weapon. The scope of the Barrett M90 varies. For a stock scope the Barrett M90 uses a 10x Leupold M series sight.

The Barrett M90 was produced between 1990 and 1995. In 1995 its replacement the Barrett M95, which is currently being used by multiple armies, was made after technological advancements in Barrett Firearm’s weapon systems. The Barrett M95 is the improved variant of the Barrett M90. The Barrett M95 has better magazine clearance because the pistol grip and trigger have been moved forward on the gun. Also, there were minor changes to the firing pin, bolt handle, and the barrel chamber is plated in chrome. The Barrett M90 still remains very popular because of its bullpup design and light weight. The Barrett M90 was bought at a slow pace and sometimes in bulk. By now, the Barrett M90 is found for sale through firearm collectors and is sold online.

== Weapon operation ==
The Barrett M90 is not meant to be a shoulder-fired weapon. Upon setup when preparing to fire the M90, it is first set up by folding down the attached bipod on the weapon and set on whatever space is being used to fire the weapon. The gun is first inspected to see if there is any debris that might cause the weapon to malfunction. Being a bolt-action rifle, there is typically little cause for error, whereas a semi-automatic rifle could jam or the round might have problems ejecting after firing. After the gun is set up in the desired firing space, the five-round magazine is loaded and the gun is ready to be fired after proper safety precautions are followed. The gun is rested on the bipod with the user holding the rifle’s handle firmly to prevent the gun from sliding back. The design that has gone into the M90 allows it to be fired in this manner without being pressed against the shoulder. The gun is able to reduce recoil through the muzzle brakes, and bipod usage. If the Barrett M90 did not have any muzzle brake then the recoil of the gun would be considerably larger and would need a different design incorporating the shoulder being pressed to the gun.

== Users ==
- Provisional IRA: Used by the Provisional Irish Republican Army.

== See also ==
- List of bullpup firearms
- List of sniper rifles
- Barrett M95
- South Armagh Sniper (1990–97)
