= Longbow T-76 =

The Longbow T-76 is a bolt action sniper rifle introduced in 1997 by Dakota Arms. The T-76 tactical rifle is based on their Model 76 hunting rifle. On its website Dakota Arms guaranteed 1/2 MOA performance with an effective range of 1500 meters for the Longbow T-76 in its .338 configuration. The T-76 tactical rifle generates up to 5,250 foot pounds (7.12 kJ) of muzzle energy and 2,850 feet per second (870 m/s) velocity from a 300 grain (19.4 g) round.
