= ZVI Falcon =

Falcon
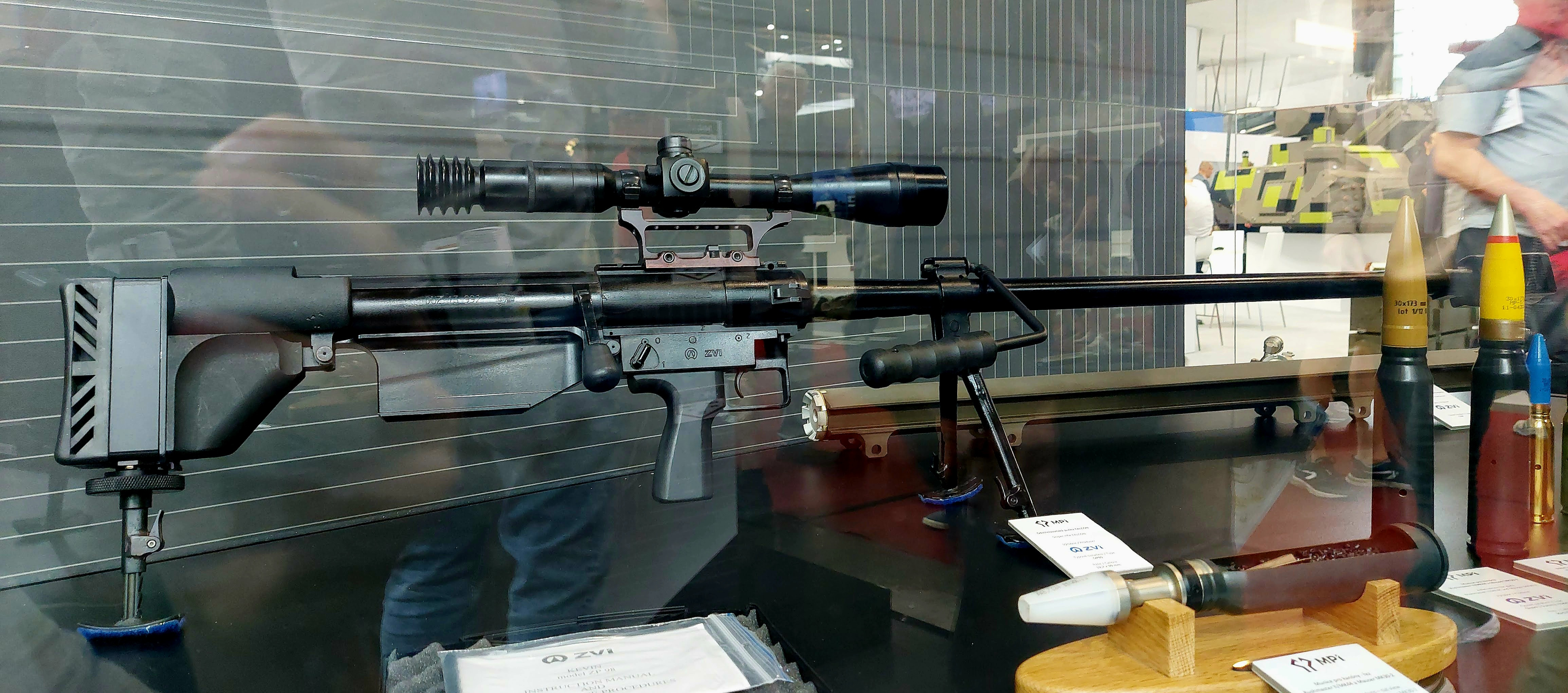
- Type: Anti-materiel rifle
- Place of origin: Czech Republic

Service history
- In service: 1998–present
- Used by: See Users
- Wars: See Conflicts

Production history
- Manufacturer: ZVI Inc. (formerly Zbrojovka Vsetín Inc.)
- Variants: OP96; OP99

Specifications (OP99)
- Mass: 12.2 kg (27 lb) (single-shot); 12.9 kg (28 lb) (with magazine)
- Length: 1,260 mm (50 in)
- Barrel length: 839 mm (33 in)
- Cartridge: .50 BMG (OP99); 12.7×108mm (OP96)
- Action: Mauser bolt action
- Muzzle velocity: 825–925 m/s (2,710–3,030 ft/s)
- Effective firing range: 1,600 m (1,700 yd) (day); 800 m (870 yd) (night)
- Feed system: 2-round fixed box magazine
- Sights: ZD 10×50 telescopic sight ZN 6× passive night vision sight Backup iron sights

The ZVI Falcon is a Czech 12.7 mm caliber bolt-action bullpup anti-materiel rifle developed by Zbrojovka Vsetín Inc. (now ZVI Inc.). The rifle is intended for ground troops and special forces for operations against distant targets up to 1,600 metres (1,700 yd) away, such as armoured fighting vehicles (AFVs) or technical equipment.

== Design and features ==
The Falcon is a bullpup bolt-action rifle with a Mauser locking system and fixed 2-round box magazine. It features a magazine cut-off; a new cartridge must be manually loaded into the chamber after each shot when it is engaged. The bolt has two locking lugs.

Mounted about halfway along the Falcon are a collapsible bipod and a carrying handle. It also features a muzzle brake to dampen recoil; ZVI states that the muzzle brake reduces recoil by 75 percent. A bayonet mount was planned, but was not included on production versions.

The Falcon features a sight rail to mount the Meopta ZD 10×50 telescopic sight for daylight engagements and the Meopta ZN 6× passive night vision sight for nighttime use. A protective cover is available to protect the scope from damage. The rifle also has backup iron sights for emergency use if the scope is damaged.

The Falcon can be stowed in a carrying case for transport, and a special backpack is available for use by airborne forces.

== Conflicts ==
The Falcon was used in the War in Afghanistan. It is also used by Armed Forces of Ukraine during Russian invasion of Ukraine.

== Users ==
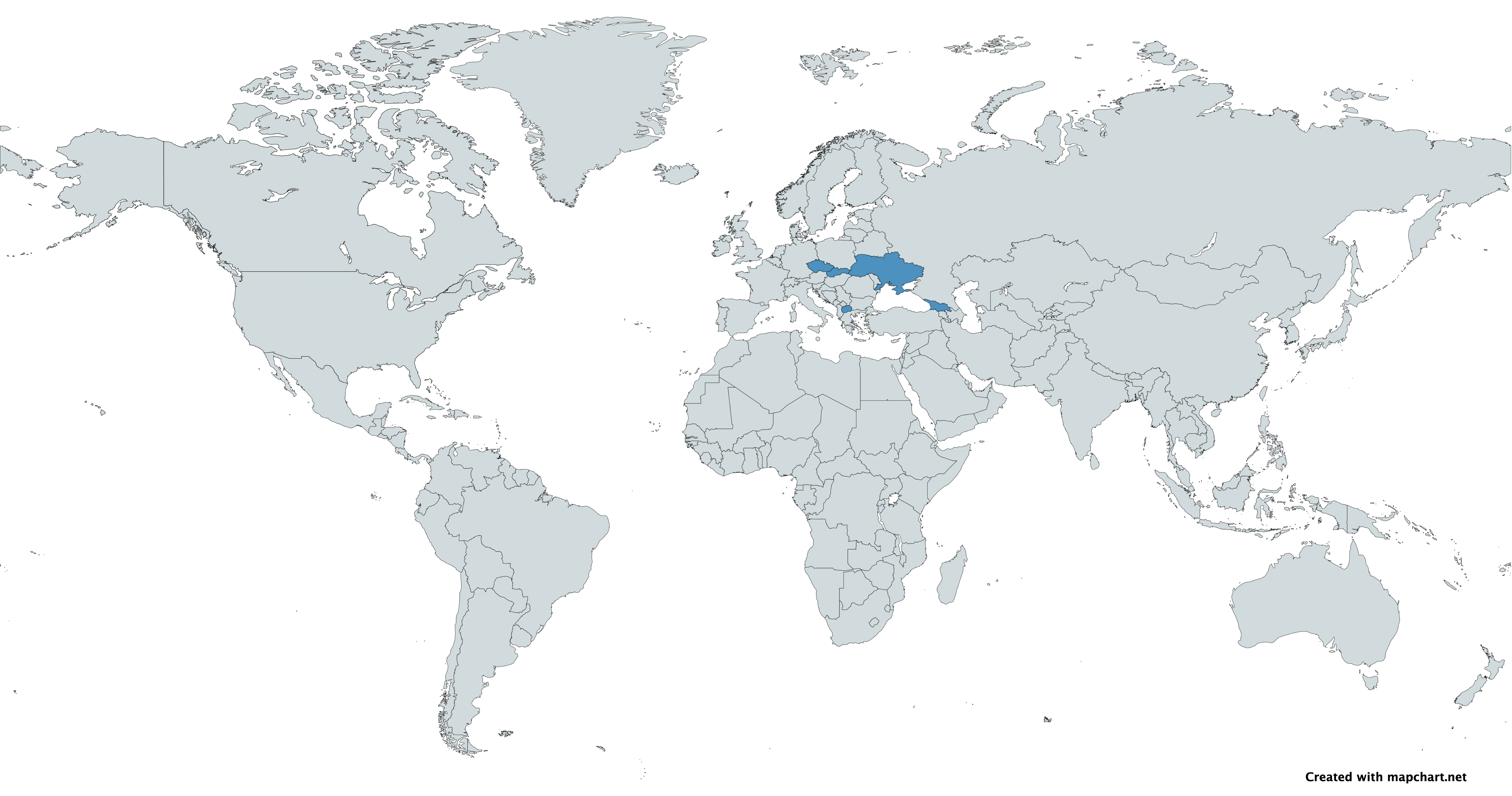
Map with ZVI Falcon users in blue

- Czech Republic
- Georgia
- North Macedonia
- Slovakia
- Ukraine 19 gifted from Czech Republic, sent as part of a military package in response to the 2022 Russian invasion of Ukraine.

== See also ==
- List of bullpup firearms
- List of sniper rifles
