= Hagelberg FH 50 =

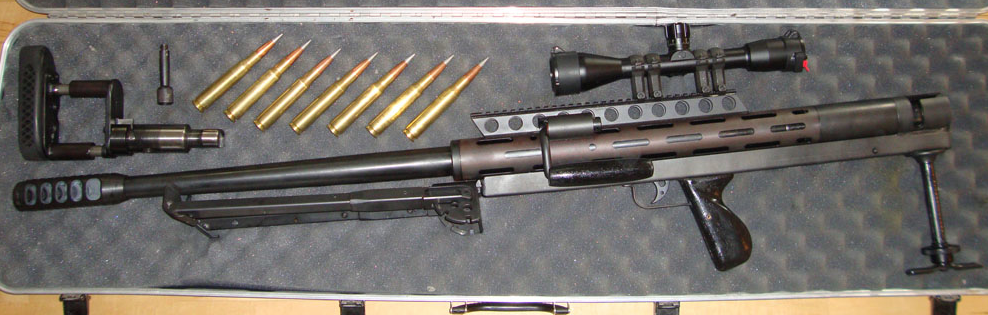
- Type: Sniper rifle
- Place of origin: Denmark

Production history
- Manufacturer: Hagelberg Arms
- Variants: K, L

Specifications
- Mass: 12.3 kg (27.1 lb) (Variant L)
- Length: 1285 mm (50.5 in) (Variant L)
- Barrel length: Variant L = 910 mm (35.8 in), Variant K = 600 mm (23.6 in)
- Cartridge: .50 BMG
- Action: Single-shot, Bolt-action
- Feed system: Single shot, loaded from the back of the buttstock (Buttstock is bolt).

Hagelberg FH 50 is a Danish .50 BMG, single shot bolt-action bullpup precision rifle manufactured by Hagelberg Arms. The rifle is designed for both target shooting and law enforcement use, and comes in two lengths, variant L (Long) and variant K (Short). The rifle can also come with a sound suppressor and short range back-up sights.

== See also ==
- Firearms, List of firearms
- .50 BMG
- Bolt action
- Single shot
