= SV-18 =

- Type: Anti-materiel rifle
- Place of origin: Russia

Production history
- Designer: Vladimir Zlobin
- Designed: 2019
- Manufacturer: Kalashnikov Concern

Specifications
- Mass: 9.1 kilograms (20 lb) (prototype)
- Caliber: 12.7×108mm 12.7x99mm (.50 BMG)
- Action: Bolt-action
- Feed system: 5 round detachable box magazine

The SV-18 is a Russian bolt-action bullpup anti-materiel rifle designed in 2019 by Kalashnikov Concern.

== History ==
A single-shot breechloading prototype of the SV-18 was first unveiled at ARMY-2017, an annual Russian military trade exhibition. At the next year's ARMY exhibition, the first instance of a magazine-fed, bolt-action design was seen, and the weapon was finalised in 2019.

== Design ==
One of the SV-18's requirements was that it massed less than 10 kilograms, which led to it being designed as a bolt action, as the recoil created would have otherwise caused discomfort. A large muzzle brake is in place to reduce recoil.

The SV-18 contains a rail on top of the receiver, and M-LOK slots on the handguard, for the attachment of accessories.

== See also ==
- KSVK 12.7
- OSV-96
- SV-98
