= MS-74 =

- Type: Sniper rifle
- Place of origin: Soviet Union

Production history
- Designer: E. F. Dragunov
- Designed: 1949
- Manufacturer: Izhevsk Machinebuilding Plant
- Produced: 1949

Specifications
- Mass: 4.84 kg
- Barrel length: 706 mm
- Cartridge: 7.62×54mmR
- Feed system: 5-round box magazine
- Sights: optical sight and iron sights

MS-74 (No.74 Factory's Modernized Sniper Rifle) was a limited edition Soviet sniper rifle, made by Yevgeny Dragunov in 1949 at Izhevsk Machinebuilding Plant. The weapon was based on the Mosin Nagant 1891/31 sniper rifle chambered in a 7.62×54mmR cartridge. The main goal of development of the rifle was to increase accuracy, improve ergonomics and ease of reloading. It was tested and recommended for use, but was neither manufactured or fielded by the Red Army in any significant quantity.
