= DSR-Precision DSR-50 =

Bullpup bolt-action anti-materiel rifle

DSR-50
- Type: Bullpup bolt-action anti-materiel rifle
- Place of origin: Germany

Production history
- Designer: Ingolf Reuter
- Designed: 2003
- Manufacturer: DSR-Precision GmbH
- Produced: 2003–?

Specifications
- Mass: 10.3 kg (22.7 lb) (empty)
- Length: 1,230 mm (48.4 in) (without blast compensator); 1,350 mm (53.1 in) (with blast compensator)
- Barrel length: 800 mm (31.5 in)
- Cartridge: .50 BMG
- Action: Bolt action
- Feed system: 3-round detachable box magazine
- Sights: Picatinny rail for mounting optical sights

The DSR-Precision DSR-50 is a bullpup bolt-action anti-materiel rifle developed and manufactured by DSR-Precision GmbH and chambered in .50 BMG. It is essentially an upscaled DSR-1.

== Design and features ==
The DSR-50 is based on DSR-Precision's earlier DSR-1, and includes modifications necessary to fire the more powerful .50 BMG, including a hydraulic recoil buffer in the buttstock and an innovative muzzle attachment. This muzzle device, described as a 'blast compensator', is a combination sound suppressor and muzzle brake, and is notable in its attempt at moderating the .50 BMG's muzzle blast and recoil, unlike contemporary large-caliber rifles, which are typically equipped with muzzle brakes only. Like the DSR-1, this rifle retains its bullpup configuration, allowing a longer barrel while retaining a shorter overall length (OAL), which is an important consideration for large caliber rounds such as .50 BMG, and focuses the weapon's balance towards the buttstock, compensating for the muzzle's heavy attachments standard on the DSR-50. The DSR-50 also retains some of the DSR-1's features, such as a top mounted bipod, "butt spike" monopod, free-floating barrel, fully adjustable cheekrest and buttstock, and forward magazine holder.

== Appearances in media ==
The DSR-50 has appeared in two pieces of media as of 2025, both being video game titles. It appears as a much more boutique rifle option than the DSR-1, which has thus far featured in twenty-two video games and multiple television shows and movies. It appeared first in Call of Duty: Black Ops 2 in 2012, though it was incorrectly depicted as having a five round magazine. The DSR-50 was then featured in Sniper: Ghost Warrior 2 released the following year, where it again features a five round magazine.

== See also ==
- List of bullpup firearms
- List of sniper rifles
