= Steyr IWS 2000 =

Anti-materiel rifle

IWS 2000
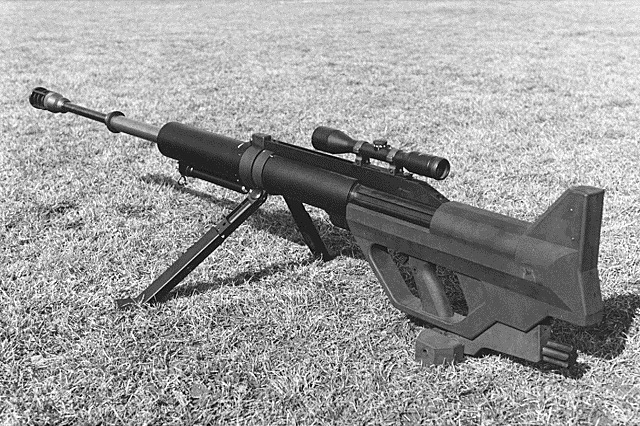
- The Steyr IWS 2000, left side view
- Type: Anti-materiel rifle
- Place of origin: Austria

Production history
- Designed: Mid-1980s
- Manufacturer: Steyr Mannlicher
- Variants: IWS 2000; AMR 5075

Specifications
- Mass: 18 kg (39.7 lb)
- Length: 1,800 mm (70.9 in)
- Barrel length: 1,200 mm (47.2 in)
- Cartridge: 15.2×169mm (IWS 2000 and AMR 5075)
- Action: Single-shot; Bolt-action
- Muzzle velocity: 1,450 metres per second (4,757 feet per second)
- Effective firing range: 1,000 metres (1,093 yards)
- Maximum firing range: 2,500 meters (2,734 yards)
- Feed system: Single-shot
- Sights: 10x telescopic sight

The Steyr Infantry Weapon System 2000 (IWS 2000) is a single-shot, bolt-action anti-materiel rifle produced by Austrian firearm manufacturer Steyr Mannlicher. Unlike other anti-tank rifle designs, the IWS 2000 has a smoothbore barrel. This facilitates higher projectile velocities and allows a longer barrel service life, but the lack of rifling-induced gyroscopic spin-stabilization requires the IWS 2000's projectile to have aerodynamic stabilizing fins instead, making it an armor-piercing fin-stabilized discarding-sabot projectile.

The first variant of the weapon was the proposed AMR 5075 (AMR standing for anti-materiel rifle). It was to fire the same type of ammunition as the IWS 2000 and to use a 5-round detachable box magazine. However, that version did not pass the proposal stage.

== Design ==
The weapon is based on a 25 cm (9 3/4 in) bolt action mechanism that recoils inside the stock. This mechanism, usually found in artillery, helps manage the heavy recoil forces of the 15.2 mm Steyr APFSDS round due to its damping effect that allows for force distribution over a longer period of time. After firing, the action recoils into a shock-absorbing hydro-pneumatic sleeve; the IWS 2000 also uses a multi-baffle muzzle brake to distribute muzzle energy and further reduce recoil. The entire rifle body is made up of a combination of high-tension plastics and superlight polymers to increase manageability and cut down on weight. The smoothbore barrel is easily detached and packed away for increased mobility. The cartridge round is inserted from the side of the weapon.

== Ammunition ==
The 15.2x169mm cartridge is a fin-stabilized discarding-sabot round the IWS 2000 was specifically designed for firing. Its maximum diameter is 26 millimeters, at its base, and with the projectile seated in it, the entire cartridge weighs 150 grams and is 207 millimeters long. The cartridge consists of several components:

- propellant within a plastic case
- a steel head which seals the bottom of the case against the chamber pressure of 4,800 bar (69,600 psi)
- the projectile itself, which weighs 35 grams and is further divided into:
  - the penetrator, a 20 g (309 gr) dart made of tungsten carbide or depleted uranium. It can pierce 40 mm of rolled homogeneous armor at a range of 1,000 meters while causing secondary fragmentation.
  - the sabot, a 15-gram plastic shell surrounding the penetrator. It captures the force of the expanding propellant, accelerating the penetrator to a muzzle velocity of 1,450 m/s, then splits into four petals and falls away as the projectile exits the barrel, leaving the penetrator to carry on to the target.

== See also ==
- List of sniper rifles
