= Werkenntwen =

German social networking site

Wer-kennt-wen Auch du kennst wen bei wer-kennt-wen ("You know someone on wer-kennt-wen too")
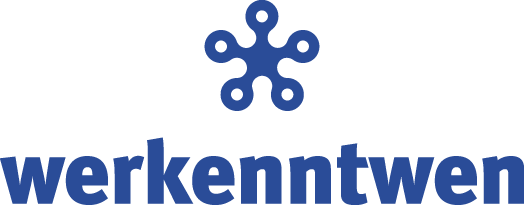
- Company type: Subsidiary
- Website type: Social network service
- Available in: German
- Headquarters: Cologne, {{{location_country}}}
- Area served: Germany, Switzerland, Austria
- Owners: RTL interactive, an RTL Group subsidiary
- Founders: Fabian Jager, Patrick Ohler
- CEO: Eva-Maria Bauch
- Employees: about 80
- Website: www.wer-kennt-wen.de
- Registration: Required (with real name)
- Users: 9.4 million (November 2011)
- Launched: October 2006
- Current status: Inactive since 2 June 2014

Werkenntwen (English: "Whoknowswhom"), often abbreviated in German as wkw, was a German social networking site. TechCrunch once compared it to Myspace. According to Alexa Internet in July 2011, werkenntwen's traffic was ranked 959 worldwide and was one of the most successful websites in Germany. The site allowed users to write blogs, chat with friends, and write in their guestbook.

== History ==
The site was started in 2006 by Fabian Jager and Patrick Ohler, two students at the University of Koblenz and Landau. Initially it was only meant for their personal use until the number of users in Germany grew, reaching 50,000 six months after it started, and one million by December 2007.

The site was awarded an OnlineStar in 2008 in the "social communities" category. In 2008, RTL interactive bought 49% of the company and bought the remainder in placing it among the ten most popular websites in German.

By October 2012, the number of unique visitors fell to 23 million. New functions and a new design were launched in October 2013 in an attempt increase the number of users.

== Closure ==
The number of users dropped to 13 million four months after the redesign and relaunch. In March 2014, RTL Interactive put the site up for sale. Like other social networks, wkw was unable to survive competition from Facebook. Having failed to find a buyer, RTL Interactive closed the site on 2 June 2014.

== Users ==
Werkenntwen did target a specific group, but was open to anyone over 14 years of age. Company statistics from 2011 reported 9.4 million registered users, of which 41.7% were male and 58.3% female, with 36.7% of all users over 40 years of age.

== Features ==
Users were able to connect with everybody they knew (colleagues, friends, neighbors, classmates etc.). They could also create profiles with photos, listing their interests, see their contacts on a map, search for people, post status updates, write blogs or in guestbooks, maintain calendars and photo albums and play games.

It was also possible to chat to other users. A mobile version of the website and an iPhone and Android app were also available.
