= MACS M3 =

Heavy sniper rifle

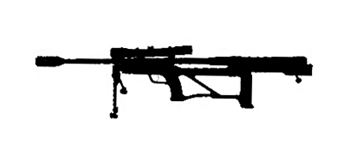
A Diagram of the MACS M3

The MACS M3 .50 BMG heavy sniper rifle is a rifle manufactured in Croatia since 1991. The version of the previous model MACS M2-A has been enhanced, and this rifle is intended for action by live power, unshielded and lightly armed vehicles, ground planes, radar and other communication antennas and systems. It is also used for the elimination of enemy snipers, the destruction of unexploded ordnance and the like. The most effective results are achieved at distances up to 1,500 meters.

It is essentially the MACS-M2A reconfigured into a bullpup layout by moving the butt stock assembly forward so that the bolt action protrudes well to the rear. This has been done to reduce the overall length to 1.11 meters and the mass, including the bipod and optical sight, to 8.8 kilograms. Many of the components, including the manual bolt action and the optical sights, remain the same as those on the MACS M2A, although the barrel length has been reduced slightly. The ballistic performance of the MACS M3 remains similar to that of the MACS M2A. This rifle can only be fired from the right shoulder.

== Variants ==
- MACS M2
- MACS M2A
- MACS M3
- MACS M4

== Facts ==
.50 MACS M3, MACS M2

- Type: Anti-material rifle
- Place of origin: Croatia
- In service: 1991–present
- Used by: Croatia, Slovenia, Bosnia and Herzegovina, Romania
- Produced: 1991–present
- Variants: MACS M3, MACS M2

== Specification ==
- Weight: 12 kg
- Cartridge: .50 Browning Machine Gun
- Action: Single shot, bolt action
