= Dragunov SVU =

OTs-03 SVU
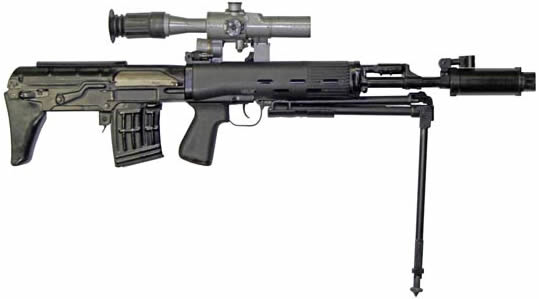
- The SVU with a bipod attached
- Type: Designated marksman rifle Battle rifle (as OTs-03A); Carbine (OTs-18 Hunting Variant)
- Place of origin: Russia

Service history
- In service: 1994–present
- Used by: (see § Users)

Production history
- Designer: KBP Instrument Design Bureau
- Designed: 1990
- Manufacturer: KBP Instrument Design Bureau
- Produced: 1994–present
- Variants: OTs-03A (SVU-A)

Specifications
- Mass: 3.6 kg (7.9 lb) (unloaded without scope)
- Length: 87 cm (34 in)
- Barrel length: 52 cm (20 in) (4 grooves, 1 in 245 mm (9.6 in) right-hand twist)
- Cartridge: 7.62×54mmR
- Action: Gas-operated, three-lug rotating bolt
- Rate of fire: 650 rpm (SVU-AS)
- Muzzle velocity: 830 m/s (2,700 ft/s)
- Effective firing range: 1,200 m (1,300 yd)
- Feed system: 10, 20, or 30-round detachable box magazine
- Sights: Front: Folding post inside ring Rear: Folding U-notch, PSO-1 telescopic sight, other optics available

The OTs-03 SVU (ОЦ-03 СВУ, Russian: Снайперская винтовка укороченная, Snájperskaja Vintóvka Ukoróčennaja, Sniper Rifle Shortened) is a bullpup designated marksman rifle. The SVU was developed to meet the needs of the security forces of the Russian Ministry of Internal Affairs, such as OMON. The SVU was first seen in use in the First Chechen War. Originally, the plan was to just slightly modernize the aging SVD, but the designers eventually realised that the configuration of the weapon would have to be completely altered, leading to the creation of the SVU.

A special muzzle brake was added that could absorb up to 40% of the recoil energy and an elastic butt stock with lamellar spring was non-rigidly attached to the receiver. The acoustics of the rifle were also improved by adding a sound suppressor. The other main improvements made to the SVU over the SVD include replacement of the butt stock, pistol grip, trigger, and the mounting for the sight; shortening the barrel by 100 mm (3.9 in) afforded the weapon perfect balance as well.

Around 1991, the Russians developed a slight variant of the OTs-03, the OTs-03A (SVU-A). Whereas the SVU is semi-automatic, the SVU-A (the A stands for automatic) is a fully automatic. In this rifle, the center of gravity was moved forward by the addition of a forward extended bipod mounted on the receiver. Developing 20 and 30 round box magazines increased the capacity of the magazine so that it could be used effectively in full automatic mode; and better optics were incorporated into the SVU-A to replace the previous units, which had been left almost untouched since the SVD.

Though it has folding iron sights, the SVU is almost always used with the PSO-1 scope with illuminated reticle, but other Russian scopes can also be mounted. The PSO-1 reticle is somewhat unique in the world of sniper scopes, in that its rangefinders are in the lower left, chevrons for bullet drop compensation are found in the middle, and stadia marks for windage to the left and right of the center reticule. The reticle is also illuminated by radioactive tritium instead of a small battery-powered lamp. The SVU also comes with an adjustable bipod. It has an integral flash hider and muzzle brake. A bayonet may be fitted under the forestock.

== Variants ==
The OTs-03A (SVU-A) (Russian: Снайперская винтовка укороченная, автоматическая, Snayperskaya Vintovka Ukorochennaya— Avtomaticheskaya, Short Sniper Rifle— Automatic) is a selective-fire version of the SVU, capable of semi-automatic or fully automatic fire.

== Users ==
- Russia: Used by the Russian Ministry of Internal Affairs.
- Yemen: Some imported prior to the ousting of the Saleh government.

== See also ==
- List of Russian weaponry
- List of bullpup firearms
- List of sniper rifles
