= M89SR sniper rifle =

M89SR
- Type: Sniper rifle/Designated Marksman Rifle
- Place of origin: Israel

Production history
- Manufacturer: Technical Consultants International (before Sardius)

Specifications
- Mass: 4.50 kg
- Length: 850 mm
- Barrel length: 560 mm
- Cartridge: 7.62×51mm NATO
- Action: Gas-operated, rotating bolt
- Muzzle velocity: 855 m/s (2,810 ft/s)
- Effective firing range: 1000 meters
- Feed system: 10 or 20-round detachable box magazine
- Sights: None

The M89SR sniper rifle is a gas operated semi-automatic sniper rifle produced by Technical Consultants International (TCI).

== Design ==
The M89SR was first introduced as the Sardius M36 Sniper Weapon System (SWS) in the 1980s. The rifle is based on the American M14 rifle in bullpup configuration.

It was intended to replace the M14, though Sardius were unable to secure financing. When Sardius went out of business, Technical Consulting International (TCI) obtained the licence to produce the M36. They made some adjustments, such as adding a new carbon fiber stock, and it was renamed the M89SR (Model 89 Sniper Rifle).

The rifle is much shorter than an assault rifle even with a sound suppressor attached, making it easy to conceal. It is also relatively light, and is more accurate than other sniper rifles.

== Users ==
- Israel: The rifle was used by the Israel Defense Forces. Reported to be in use with Sayeret Duvdevan and Sayeret Shimshon.
