= SAN 511 =

SAN 511 / OM 50 Nemesis
- Type: Bolt-action sniper rifle
- Place of origin: Switzerland

Production history
- Manufacturer: Swiss Arms (formerly AMSD)

Specifications
- Mass: 12 to 15 kg (26 to 33 lb)
- Length: 1,100 to 1,500 mm (43 to 59 in)
- Caliber: .50 BMG
- Barrels: 380 to 810 mm (15 to 32 in)

The SAN 511, formerly OM 50 Nemesis, is a bolt-action sniper rifle made by Swiss manufacturer Swiss Arms (under license from AMSD).
It was created in early 2001 by Chris L. Movigliatti.
It fires the .50 BMG cartridge. It has a reported accuracy of 0.5 minute of arc (MOA) at 300 m (980 ft) and under 1 MOA at 1,000 m (3,300 ft).

== Users ==
- Azerbaijan:Used by Special Forces and State Border Service (DSX)
- Georgia: Used by Georgian Special Operations Forces.
- Ukraine: Used by law enforcement forces under Ministry of Internal Affairs.
