= KSVK 12.7 =

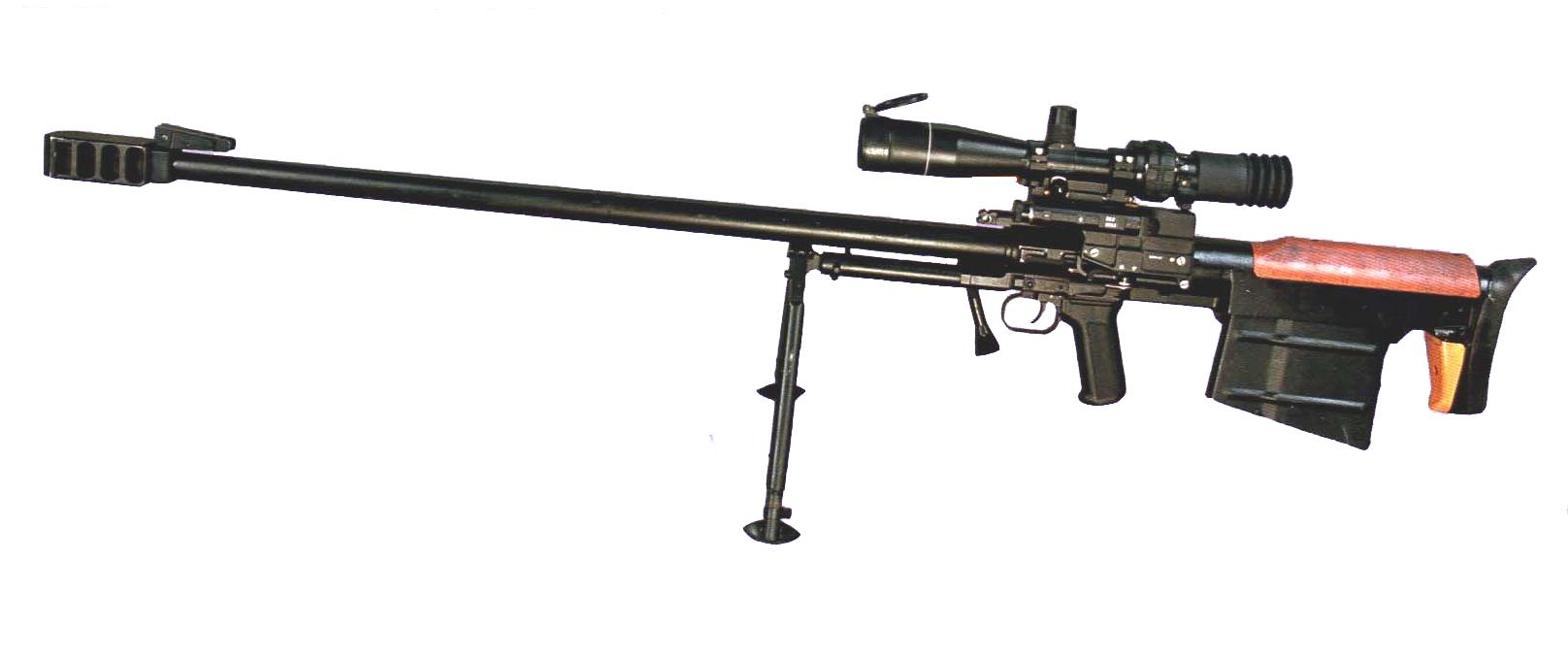
- The KSVK 12.7
- Type: Anti materiel sniper rifle
- Place of origin: Russia

Service history
- In service: Russian Defense Ministry
- Used by: See Users
- Wars: See Conflicts

Production history
- Designer: E.V. Zhuravlev, M.Y. Kuchin, and V.I. Negrulenko
- Designed: 1997
- Manufacturer: Degtyarev plant
- Produced: 1997 (KSVK); 2018 (AVSK-M)
- Variants: See Variants

Specifications
- Mass: 12 kg w/o scope
- Length: 1420 mm
- Barrel length: 1000 mm
- Cartridge: 12.7×108mm
- Caliber: 12.7mm
- Action: Bolt action
- Rate of fire: 10 s.p.m.
- Muzzle velocity: 770–860 m/s
- Effective firing range: 1500 m
- Maximum firing range: 2000 m
- Feed system: 5-round detachable box magazine
- Sights: Iron sights, rails for mounting various sniper sights

The KSVK 12.7 (Russian: Крупнокалиберная Снайперская Винтовка Ковровская, romanized: Krupnokalibernaya Snayperskaya Vintovka Kovrovskaya, lit. 'Large-Caliber Kovrov Sniper Rifle'), also known as the Kovrov or Degtyarev sniper rifle, is a 12.7x108mm anti-materiel rifle developed in Russia by the Degtyarev plant for the purpose of counter sniping and penetrating thick walls, as well as light armored vehicles. It is based on the SVN-98 12.7mm experimental rifle.

== Design ==
The KSVK is a bullpup-configured, bolt-action, magazine-fed rifle. It is equipped with a muzzle device which acts as a muzzle brake.

The KSVK is equipped with standard Russian side-mounted scope rail (dovetail), and can be fitted with variety of day and night scopes. Open iron sights are installed for backup or emergency purposes.

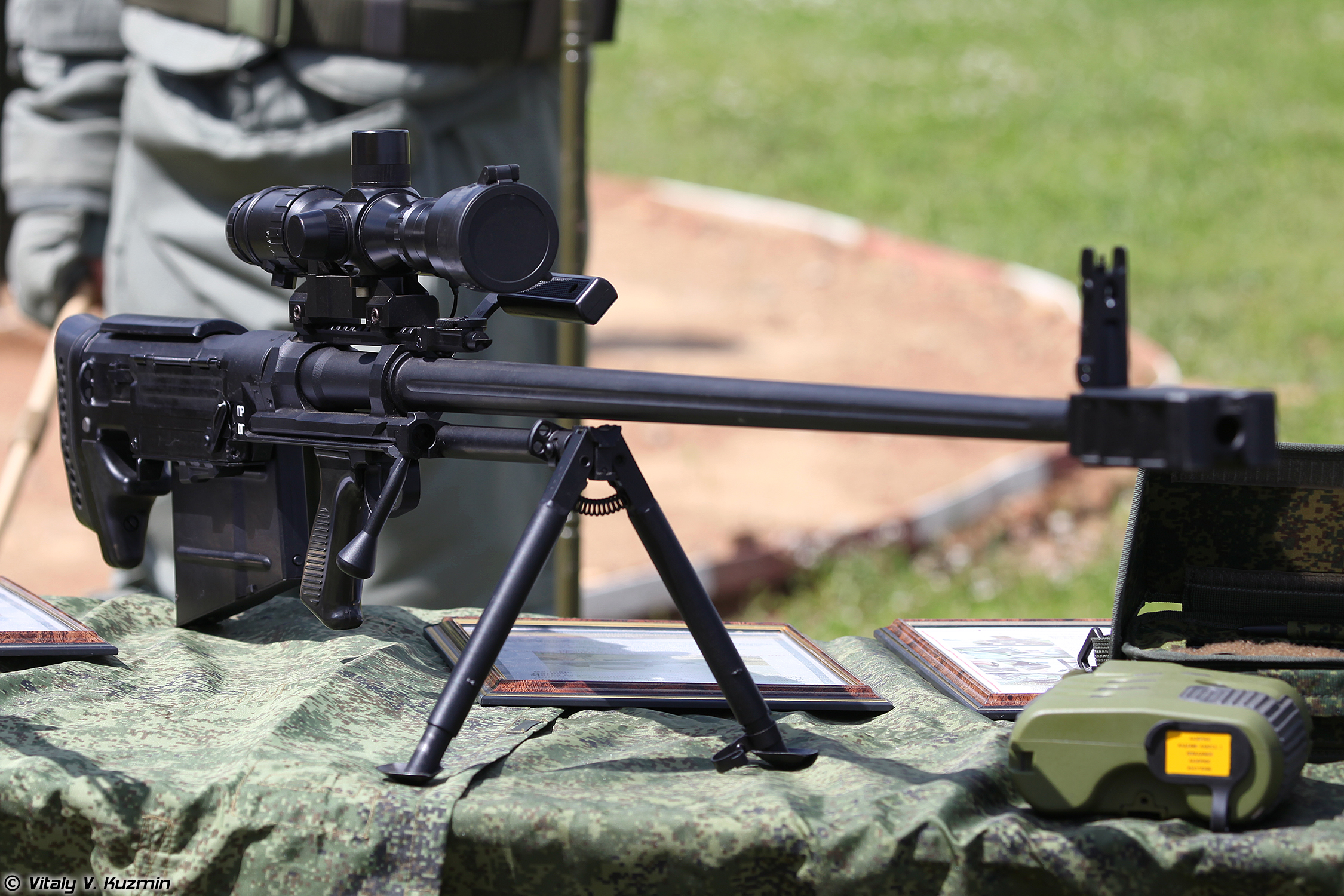
ASVK-M Kord-M Variant

== Variants ==
- SVN-98 (СВН-98)
- KSVK (КСВК)
- ASVK (АСВК, army Kovrov large-caliber sniper rifle) – adopted by Ministry of Defence of the Russian Federation under designation 6S8 "KORD" sniper complex (6С8 «Корд») in June 2013 and used by the Syrian Arab Army during the Syrian Civil War.
- SBT12M1, a Vietnamese design based on the Russian KSVK with several modifications to fit the local conditions. It is equipped with the also Vietnamese produced N12 optical sight with 10x magnification. Manufactured at Z111 and Z199 factories.
- ASVK-M Kord-M: Upgraded version

== Conflicts ==
The KSVK 12.7 has been in the following conflicts:

- Second Chechen War
- Syrian Civil War
- 2022 Russian invasion of Ukraine

== Users ==
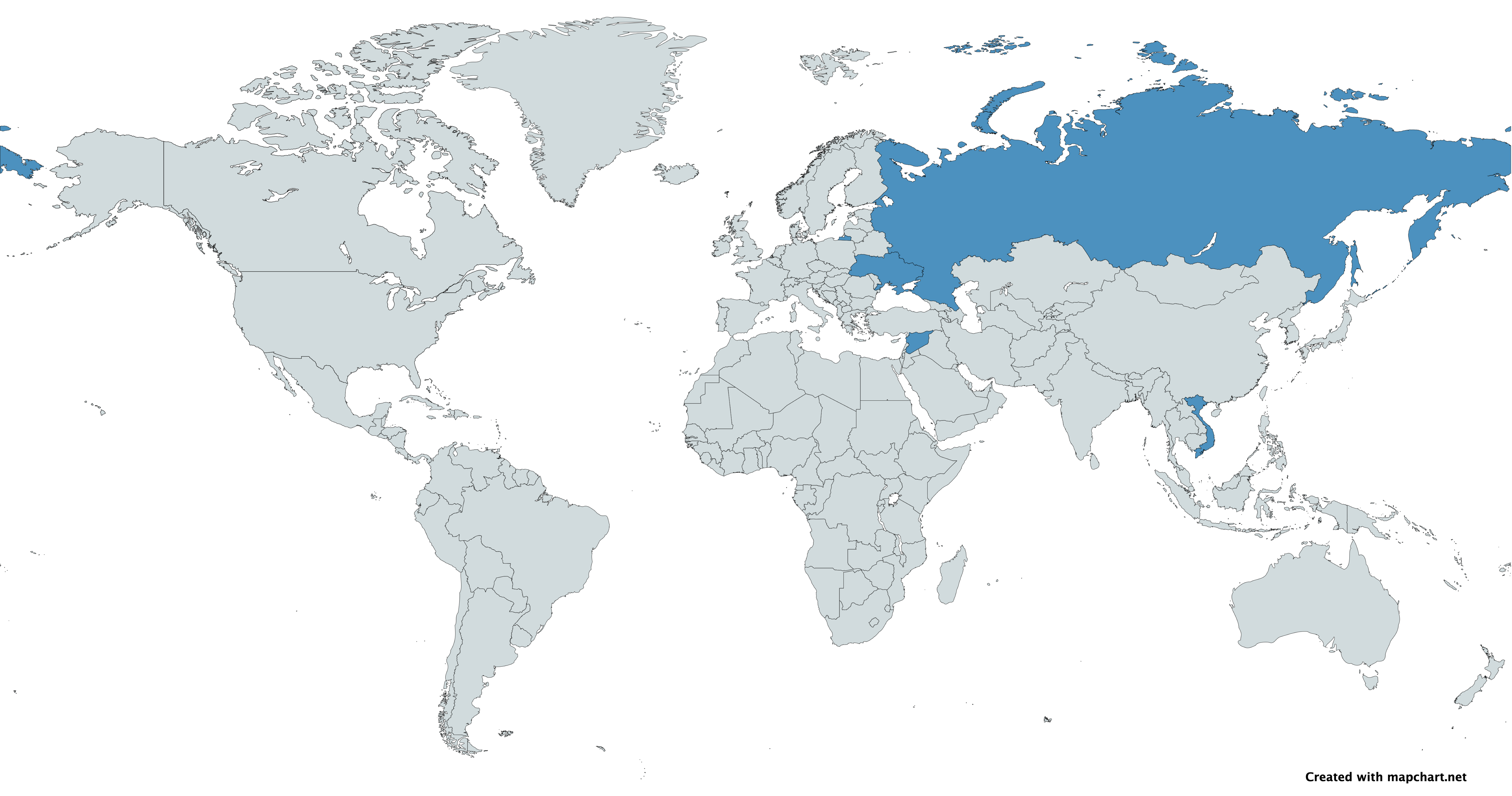
Map with KSVK 12.7 users in blue

- Russia: ASVK is currently used by units of the Southern, Eastern and Western Military Districts and Northern Fleet. Improved version ASVK-M Kord-M entered service in June 2018.
  - Russian separatist forces in eastern Ukraine
- Syria: Used by the Syrian Armed Forces.
- Ukraine: ASVK-M Kord-M, captured from Russian forces during 2022 Russian invasion of Ukraine.
- Vietnam: SBT12M1, a domestically produced version, featuring modifications to suit local conditions made by Z111 Factory.

== See also ==
- List of Russian weaponry
- List of bullpup firearms
- List of sniper rifles
- Barrett M95
- Denel NTW-20
- Istiglal Ist-14.5
- OSV-96, the KSVK's service competitor
- PTRD
