= Barrett M95 =

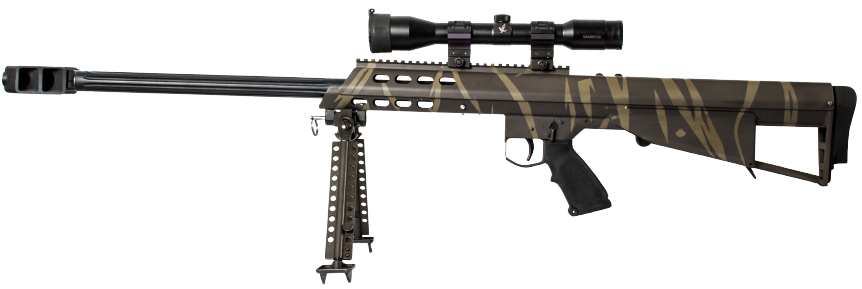
- The Barrett M95 with camouflage finish
- Type: Bullpup Anti materiel sniper rifle
- Place of origin: United States

Service history
- In service: 1997–present
- Used by: See Users

Production history
- Manufacturer: Barrett Firearms Company
- Produced: 1995–present

Specifications
- Mass: 23.5 pounds (10.7 kg) empty, without scope
- Length: 45 inches (114.3 cm)
- Barrel length: 29 inches (73.7 cm)
- Cartridge: .50 BMG (12.7×99mm)
- Action: Bolt action
- Muzzle velocity: 2,800 feet per second (854 m/s) (with M33 ball ammunition)
- Effective firing range: 2,000 yards (1,800 m)
- Maximum firing range: 6,800 meters (7,400 yd)
- Feed system: 5-round detachable box magazine
- Sights: None

The Barrett M95 is a bolt-action rifle chambered in .50 BMG (12.7×99mm) and manufactured by Barrett Firearms Company. It has been adopted by multiple militaries around the world.

== Overview ==
The M95 is an improved version of the earlier Barrett M90. It is a bolt-action rifle in a bullpup design. The major difference between the M95 and the M90 is that the pistol grip and trigger have been moved forward 1 inch (25 mm) for better magazine clearance. Also, the bolt handle has been redesigned and bent down and to the rear, the barrel chamber has been plated in chrome, and there are also some minor changes to the trigger and firing pin.

== XM107 ==
In 1999, the M95 won a military competition to become the new XM107. A small number were purchased by the U.S. Army for further testing, but ultimately, the M82 was chosen. The Barrett website also announces that M95 rifle is used for military and law enforcement applications in at least 15 other countries.

== Users ==
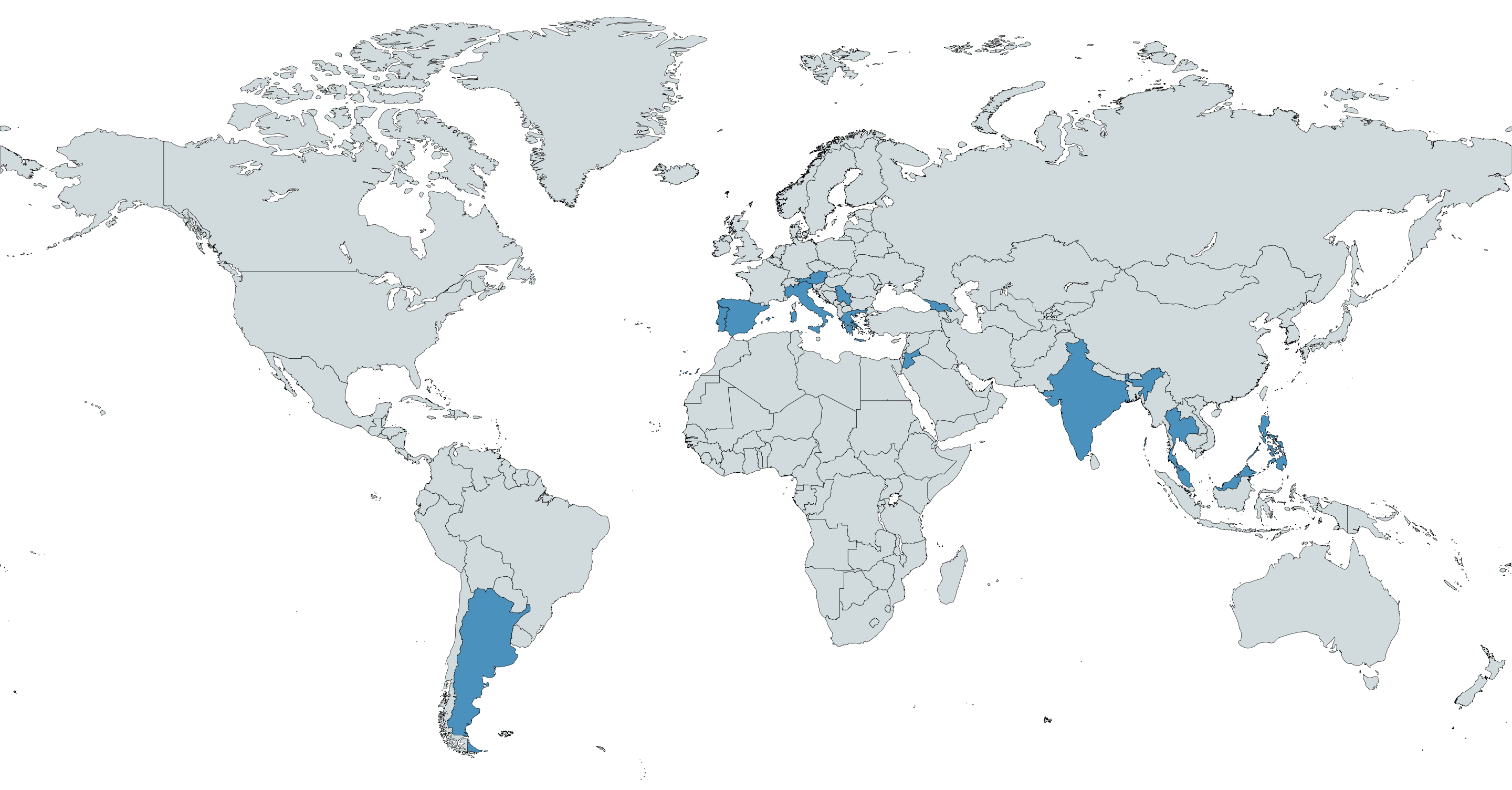
Map with users of the Barrett M95 in blue

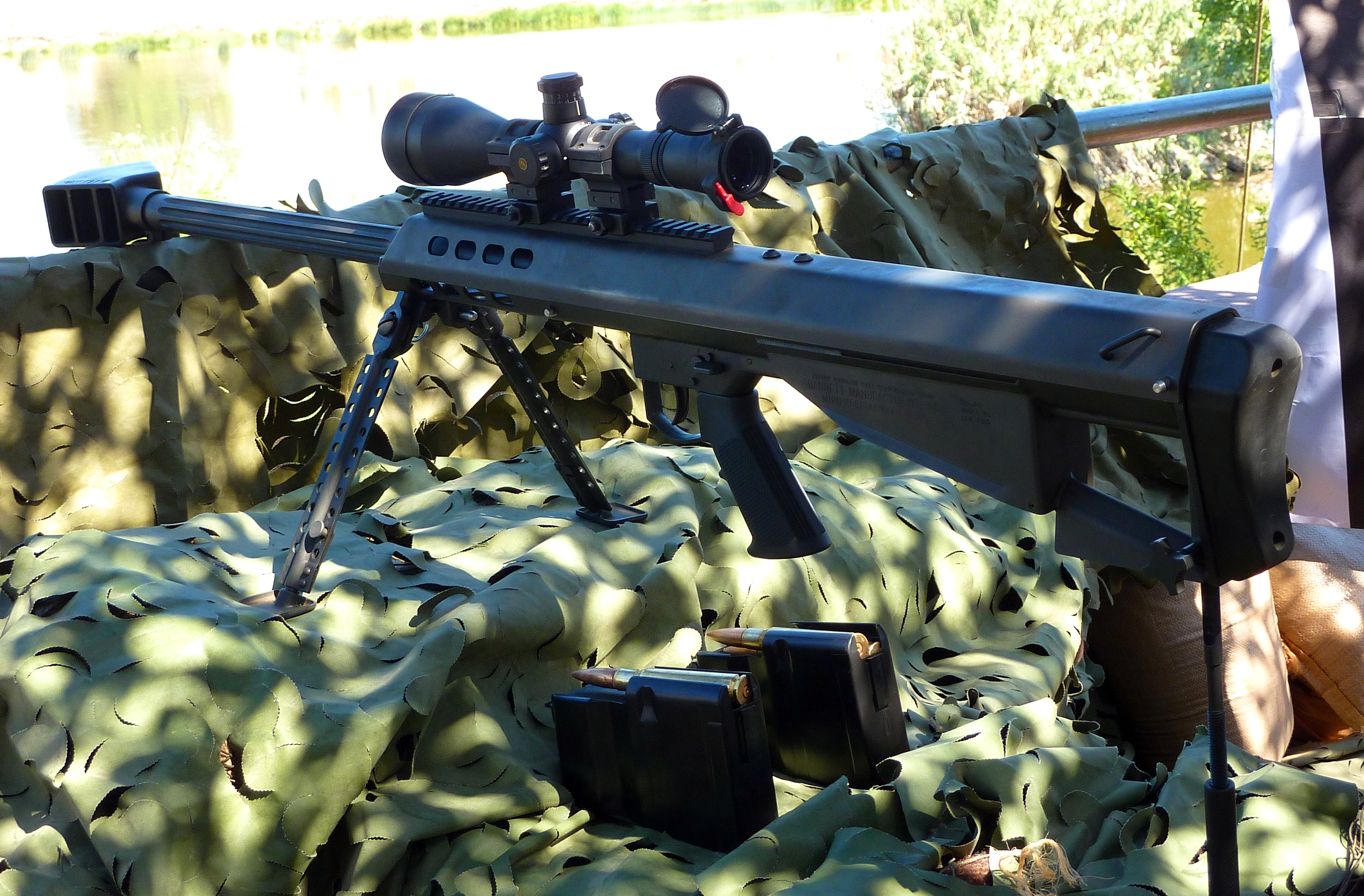
Barrett M95SP with magazines, ready to be fired

- Argentina - Comandos Anfibios, Gendarmería Nacional Sección de Fuerzas Especiales, Grupo Alacrán
- Austria - Jagdkommando special group of the Austrian Army.
- Greece
- Georgia - Used in limited number by special operations forces.
- India - Indian Army.
- Italy - 9th Parachute Assault Regiment "Col Moschin".
- Jordan: Employed by Jordanian Special Operations Forces.
- Malaysia - Employed by the Malaysian Army Grup Gerak Khas.
- Philippines - Adopted by the Philippine Marine Corps. Rifles were purchased in 1998.
- Portugal - Used by the Special Operations Troops Centre of the Portuguese Army.
- Serbia - Used by the 72nd Brigade for Special Operations and the 63rd Parachute Brigade of the Serbian Armed Forces as well as by the Gendarmery.
- Spain - Spanish Army and Spanish Navy.
- Thailand - Royal Thai Navy SEALs.

== See also ==
- List of bullpup firearms
- List of sniper rifles
