= Snipex Alligator =

Ukrainian anti-materiel rifle

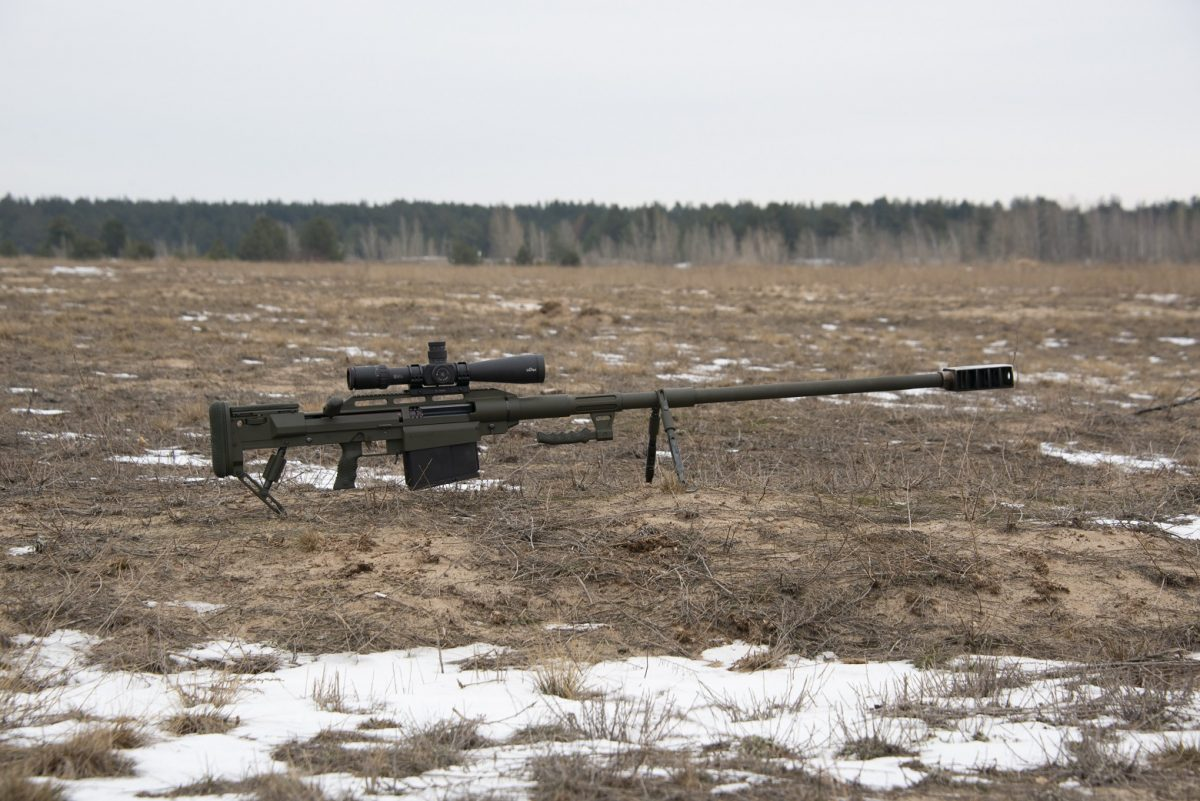
- Type: Anti-materiel rifle
- Place of origin: Ukraine

Service history
- In service: 2021–present
- Wars: Russo-Ukrainian War

Production history
- Manufacturer: XADO-Holding Ltd.
- Produced: 2020

Specifications
- Mass: 25 kg (55 lb) (14.5×114mm); 16 kg (35 lb) (12.7x108mm, .50 BMG)
- Length: 2,000 mm (79 in) (14.5×114mm); 1,620 mm (64 in) (12.7x108mm, .50 BMG)
- Barrel length: 1,200 mm (47 in) (14.5×114mm); 850 mm (33 in) (12.7x108mm, .50 BMG)
- Cartridge: 14.5×114mm; 12.7x108mm; .50 BMG
- Action: Manually operated, bolt action
- Muzzle velocity: 980 m/s (3,200 ft/s)
- Effective firing range: 4,000 m (13,000 ft)
- Maximum firing range: 7,000 m (23,000 ft)
- Feed system: 5-round detachable box magazine (14.5×114mm); 10-round detachable box magazine (.50 BMG)
- Sights: MIL-STD rail

The Snipex Alligator is a bolt-action very-long-range magazine-fed anti-materiel rifle chambered in 14.5×114mm and manufactured by XADO Holding Ltd.

== Design ==
The Snipex Alligator long-range large-caliber magazine-fed repeating rifle is designed to engage moving and stationary targets: vehicles, communications and air defense systems, aircraft in parking areas, fortified fixed defensive positions, dugouts, etc. The box magazine is detachable and holds five rounds of ammunition. It is designed to penetrate 10 mm (0.39 in) of armor plate at a distance of 1,500 m (1,600 yd).

The rifle was designed to take into account all the requirements for high-precision shooting. Barrel locking is achieved through a rotating bolt. The rifle exhibits an "acceptable" level of recoil during shooting. Recoil is suppressed by a muzzle brake, a recoil isolator, an elastic multilayer shoulder pad, and optimally balanced weight.

The rifle has a height-adjustable cheek rest, which can be positioned for right- or left-handed shooting. For ease of aiming, the rifle is equipped with a folding bipod and an adjustable rear support, allowing for fine adjustment. It has a Picatinny rail with a 35 arc minute gradient on which various sighting devices can be mounted.

== History ==
The rifle was first introduced in June 2020 on the official Snipex Facebook page. In July, the first presentation video appeared on the official YouTube channel of XADO. Based on the state examinations results, the 14.5×114 mm caliber Snipex Alligator rifle was unofficially adopted by the Armed Forces of Ukraine in 2020; it was officially adopted on 2 March 2021.

The Alligator has been used by Ukrainian forces during the 2022 Russian invasion of Ukraine. A near-record killing shot was recorded there in November 2022 at a confirmed distance of 2,710 m (8,890 ft).

On 14 August 2025, Ukrainian journalist and soldier Yurii Butusov claimed that another sniper killed two Russian targets at a distance of 4,000 meters using the Alligator, setting a new record for the longest range sniper kill. The shot was reportedly made with assistance by AI and a drone.

== Users ==
- Ukraine: Armed Forces of Ukraine

== See also ==
- Snipex T-Rex
- Snipex M
- Snipex Rhino Hunter
