= Ramo M600 =

Sniper rifle

The Ramo M600 is a .50 BMG, 12.7×108mm and 14.5×114mm bolt-action sniper rifle.
