= Snipex T-Rex =

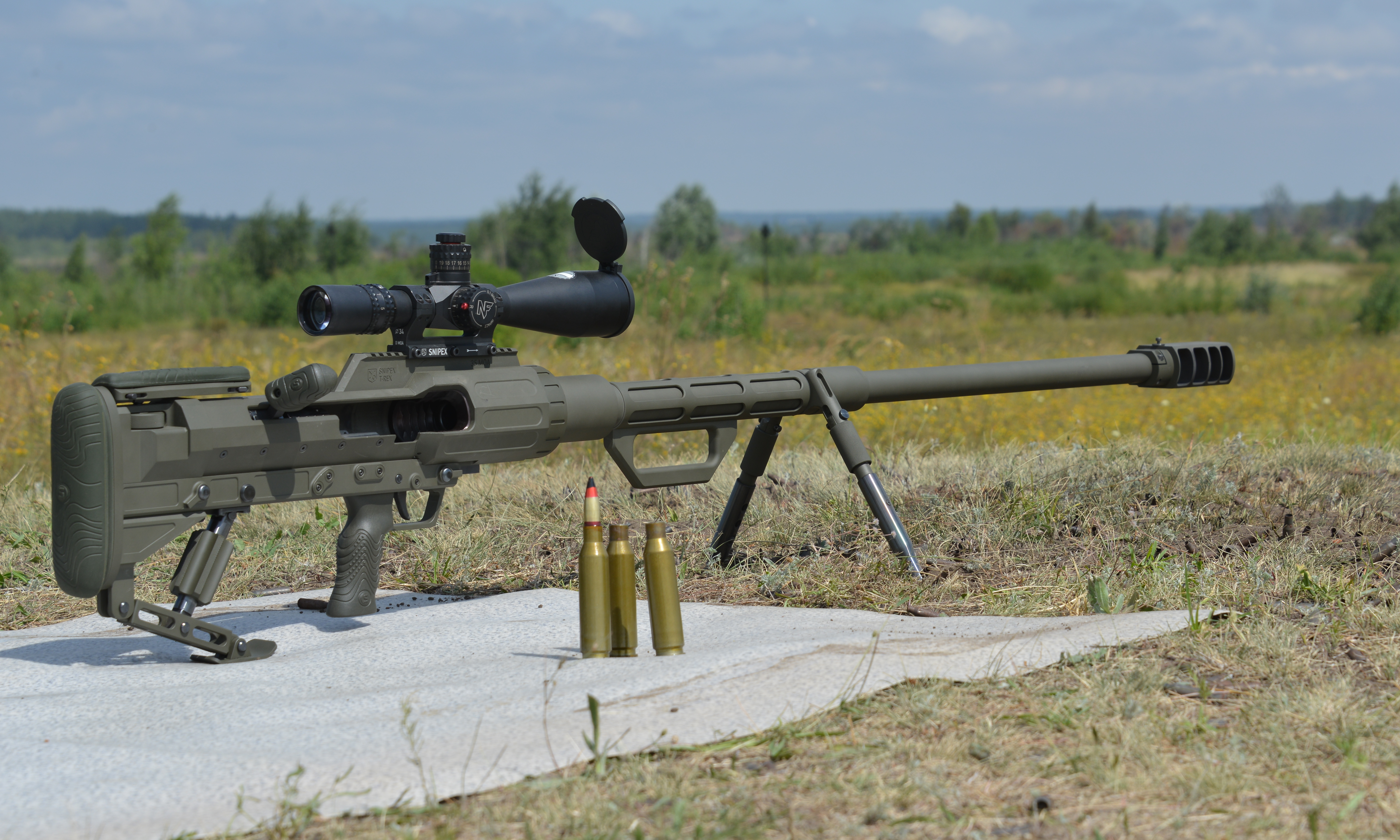
- Type: Anti-materiel rifle
- Place of origin: Ukraine

Service history
- Used by: Armed Forces of Ukraine

Production history
- Manufacturer: XADO-Holding Ltd.
- Produced: 2017–present

Specifications
- Mass: 25 kg (55 lb)
- Length: 1,800 mm (71 in)
- Barrel length: 1,200 mm (47 in)
- Cartridge: 14.5×114mm
- Action: Rotating bolt
- Muzzle velocity: 980 m/s (3,200 ft/s)
- Effective firing range: 2,000 m (6,600 ft)
- Maximum firing range: 7,000 m (23,000 ft)
- Feed system: Single-shot
- Sights: MIL-STD rail

The Snipex T-Rex is a single-shot anti-materiel rifle chambered for the 14.5×114mm cartridge and manufactured by XADO-Holding Ltd., Kharkiv, Ukraine.

== Design ==
The T-Rex is a bolt-action rifle. During loading, the cartridge is inserted into the breech opening with the bolt open. Barrel locking is achieved through a rotating bolt. The floating barrel is in free recoil when the bullet flies out. Recoil is suppressed due to the muzzle brake, the effect of a recoil isolator, an elastic multilayer shoulder pad, and a balanced weight.

The rifle is suitable for shooting resting both on the right and left shoulders. It has a height-adjustable cheek rest that can be installed on the right or on the left side. The rifle has a bipod and an adjustable rear support, which allows for adjustment to the shooter's needs.

The rifle has a Picatinny rail with 50 MOA gradient, on which various sighting devices can be mounted.

== History ==
The first development was presented at the XIV International Specialized Exhibition “Arms and Security 2017”. In the course of constant improvements, a number of changes were made to the design of the rifle. Based on the state examinations results, the 14.5×114 mm caliber Snipex T- Rex rifle has been adopted by the Armed Forces of Ukraine in 2020.

== Users ==
- Ukraine: Used by the Armed Forces of Ukraine

== See also ==
- Snipex M
- Snipex Rhino Hunter
- Snipex Alligator
- Istiglal anti-materiel rifle
