= M85 machine gun =

Machine Gun, Cal .50, Fixed, M85
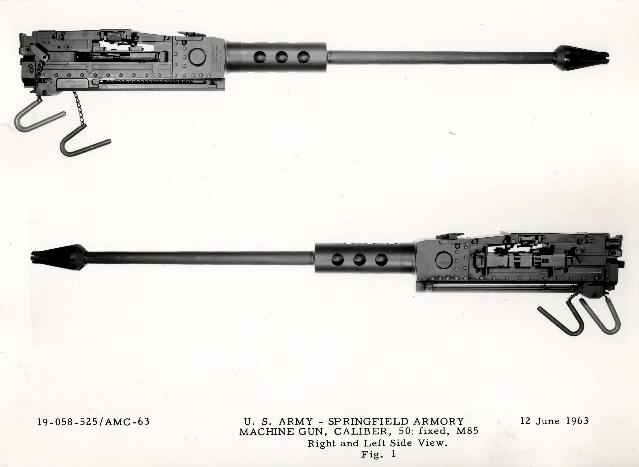
- M85 machine gun
- Type: Heavy machine gun
- Place of origin: United States

Service history
- Used by: U.S./NATO-aligned countries
- Wars: Gulf War/Operation Desert Storm

Production history
- Manufacturer: General Electric
- Variants: See Variants

Specifications
- Mass: 65 lb (29.5 kg)
- Length: 54.5 in (1,384.3 mm)
- Cartridge: 12.7×99mm NATO (.50 BMG)
- Action: Recoil-operated
- Rate of fire: 400–625 rd/min
- Muzzle velocity: 2,887 ft/s (880.0 m/s)
- Effective firing range: 2,187 yd (1,999.8 m)
- Maximum firing range: 7,330 yd (6,702.6 m)
- Feed system: Belt Feed, left or right hand

The M85 is a heavy machine gun firing .50 BMG ammunition that was used primarily for turreted applications in armored fighting vehicles. It was intended to replace the venerable M2 machine gun with a smaller and much lighter weapon, suitable for use inside fighting vehicles, as opposed to only on external mounts. It is used on the M60 series of tanks and the LVTP-7 amphibious landing vehicle.

== Design and development ==
Intended as a smaller, lighter, more capable replacement for the venerable M2 Browning machine gun, the M85 was produced by General Electric. The weapon was developed with selectable high and low rates of fire for engagement of both ground and air targets, a feature lacking in the older M2.

The M85 was the standard heavy tank machine gun for the M60 series, and was also used on the LVTP-7 amphibious vehicle. It is an air-cooled, recoil operated machine gun, has a short receiver and quick change barrel, and can be configured for left or right hand feeding. The M85 is significantly lighter than the M2 by 20 lb (9.1 kg) and significantly smaller, a prime consideration for its intended role inside the cramped interiors of armored vehicles. Firing and charging are achieved by pull on one of two color-coded pull chains (black for charging and red for firing), or firing could be initiated by means of a switch activated solenoid on the M-19 cupola elevation mechanism.

The M85 used the M15 push-through link to feed ammunition as opposed to the M2 or M9 pull-out links used on the M2 and M3 Browning machine guns. The M85 had a slow (400 rpm) & high (900 rpm) rate of fire. The link difference created issues with ammunition supply, since despite the same .50 BMG cartridges being used in both machine guns, the ammunition was supplied already packed on links. Re-linking was not practical in the field.

In service the M85 was found to be unreliable due to the metallic link catching in the feed system, compared to the stock M2 machine gun. The weapon was tested on the XM-1 Abrams, but not fitted to the production M1 Abrams, and was replaced by the M2 machine gun on the improved AAVP-7. An attempt was also made to make a version of the M85 that would replace the M2 in the infantry role was designated the M85C, and features standard spade grips and can be fitted to the M3 heavy tripod. The M85C was unpopular and this weapon was not adopted.

The M85 was also tested by the United Kingdom under the designations XL17E1 and XL17E2. They were equipped with special-purpose barrels and evaluated as ranging machine guns. The weapon was not adopted.

== Variants ==
=== M85 ===
- Basic weapon, designed for mounting inside vehicle cupolas

=== M85C ===
- Flexible infantry variant with sights and spade grips

== See also ==
- M2 Browning machine gun
