= .50 BMG =

Rifle cartridge designed by John Moses Browning

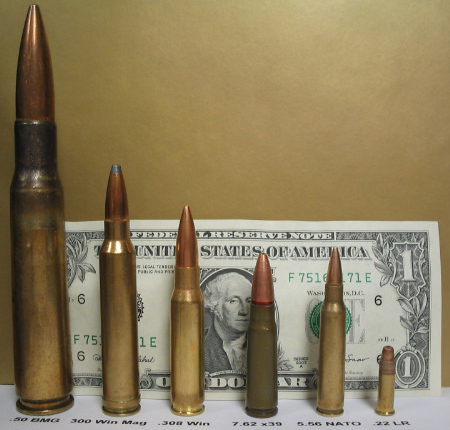
- From left: .50 BMG, .300 Win Mag, .308 Winchester, 7.62 × 39mm, 5.56 × 45mm NATO, .22 long rifle
- Type: Heavy machine gun Anti-materiel rifle
- Place of origin: United States

Service history
- In service: 1921–present
- Used by: NATO
- Wars: World War II; 1947-1949 Palestine war Korean War; Vietnam War; Cambodian Civil War; War on drugs Falklands War; Persian Gulf War; The Troubles; Global War on Terrorism; War in Afghanistan (2001–2021); Iraq War; Colombian conflict Mexican drug war Sri Lanka Civil War; Syrian Civil War; War in Iraq (2013–2017); Yemeni Civil War (2014–present); Saudi Arabian-led intervention in Yemen; Saudi–Yemeni border conflict (2015–present); Russian invasion of Ukraine

Production history
- Designer: Winchester Repeating Arms Co. and Frankford Arsenal

Specifications
- Case type: Rimless, bottleneck
- Bullet diameter: 0.511 in (12.98 mm)
- Land diameter: 0.498 in (12.65 mm)
- Neck diameter: 0.560 in (14.22 mm)
- Shoulder diameter: 0.714 in (18.14 mm)
- Base diameter: 0.804 in (20.42 mm)
- Rim diameter: 0.804 in (20.42 mm)
- Rim thickness: 0.089 in (2.26 mm)
- Case length: 3.910 in (99.31 mm)
- Overall length: 5.450 in (138.43 mm)
- Case capacity: 292.80 gr H_{2}O (18.973 cm^{3})
- Primer type: #35 Arsenal Primer
- Maximum pressure (TM43-0001-27): 54,923 psi (378.68 MPa)
- Maximum pressure (EPVAT): 60,481 psi (417.00 MPa)
- Maximum pressure (C.I.P.): 53,664 psi (370.00 MPa)

Ballistic performance
Bullet mass/type	Velocity	Energy
647 gr (42 g) Speer	3,044 ft/s (928 m/s)	13,310 ft⋅lbf (18,050 J)
655 gr (42 g) ADI	3,029 ft/s (923 m/s)	13,350 ft⋅lbf (18,100 J)
700 gr (45 g) Barnes	2,978 ft/s (908 m/s)	13,971 ft⋅lbf (18,942 J)
750 gr (49 g) Hornady	2,820 ft/s (860 m/s)	13,241 ft⋅lbf (17,952 J)
800 gr (52 g) Barnes	2,895 ft/s (882 m/s)	14,895 ft⋅lbf (20,195 J)
- Test barrel length: 45 in (1.1 m); Source: Ammoguide.com

The .50 BMG (.50 Browning Machine Gun), also known as 12.7 × 99mm NATO, and designated as the 50 Browning by the C.I.P., is a .50 in (12.7 mm) caliber cartridge developed for the M2 Browning heavy machine gun in the late 1910s, entering official service in 1921. Under STANAG 4383, it is a standard service cartridge for NATO forces. The cartridge itself has been made in many variants: multiple generations of regular ball, tracer, armor-piercing (AP), incendiary, and saboted sub-caliber penetrator rounds. The rounds intended for machine guns are made into a continuous ammunition belt using metallic links.

The .50 BMG cartridge is also used in anti-materiel rifles. A wide variety of ammunition is available, and the availability of match grade ammunition has increased the usefulness of .50 caliber rifles by allowing more accurate fire than lower-quality rounds.

== History ==
In response to the need for new anti-aircraft weaponry during World War I, John Browning developed the .50 BMG. He wanted the round to be used in a machine gun based on a scaled-up version of the M1917 Browning.

The development of the .50 BMG round is sometimes confused with the German 13.2 mm TuF, which Germany developed for an anti-tank rifle to combat British tanks during World War I and against aircraft. According to American Rifleman:

the Browning .50 originated in the Great War. American interest in an armor-piercing cartridge was influenced by the marginal French 11 mm design, prompting U.S. Army Ordnance officers to consult Browning. They wanted a heavy projectile at 2700 feet per second (f.p.s), but the ammunition did not exist. Browning pondered the situation and, according to his son John, replied, "Well, the cartridge sounds pretty good to start. You make up some cartridges and we'll do some shooting."

The American Rifleman further explains that development was:

[r]eputedly influenced by Germany's 13.2 × 92 mm SR (.53-cal.) anti-tank rifle, Ordnance contracted with Winchester to design a .50-cal. cartridge. Subsequently, Frankford Arsenal took over from Winchester, producing the historic .50 BMG or 12.7 × 99 mm cartridge. The Army then returned to John Browning for the actual gun. Teamed with Colt, he produced prototypes ready for testing and, ironically, completed them by Nov. 11, 1918—the Great War's end.

The round was put into use in the M1921 Browning machine gun. This gun was later developed into the M2HB Browning, which, with its .50 caliber armor-piercing cartridges, went on to function as an anti-aircraft and anti-vehicular machine gun, capable of penetrating 0.9 inches (23 mm) of face-hardened armor steel plate at 220 yards (200 m), 1 inch (25 mm) of rolled homogeneous armor at the same range, and 0.75 inches (19 mm) at 547 yards (500 m).

During World War II, the .50 BMG was primarily used in the M2 Browning machine gun, in both its "light barrel" aircraft mount version and the "heavy barrel" (HB) version on ground vehicles, for anti-aircraft purposes. An upgraded variant of the M2 Browning HB machine gun used during World War II is still in use today. Since the mid-1950s, some armored personnel carriers and utility vehicles have been designed to withstand 12.7 mm machine-gun fire, thereby limiting the destructive capability of the M2. It still has more penetrating power than lighter weapons such as general-purpose machine guns, though it is significantly heavier and more cumbersome to transport. Its range and accuracy, however, are superior to light machine guns when fixed on tripods. It has not been replaced as the standard caliber for Western vehicle-mounted machine guns (Soviet and CIS armored vehicles mount 12.7 × 108mm NSVs, which have similar dimensions to .50 BMGs).

Decades later, the .50 BMG was chambered in high-powered rifles as well. The Barrett M82 rifle was developed during the 1980s and, along with later variants, has upgraded the anti-materiel power of the military sniper.

== Typical uses ==
The primary military use of this round is in the M2 Browning machine gun and anti-materiel rifles such as the Barrett M82.

The U.S. Coast Guard uses .50 BMG rifles onboard armed helicopters to disable the engines on boats during interdictions. Similarly, .50 BMG weapons have attracted attention from law enforcement agencies; they have been adopted by the New York City Police Department and the Pittsburgh Police. A .50 BMG round can effectively disable a vehicle when fired into the engine block. A .50 BMG round will penetrate most commercial brick walls and concrete cinder blocks.

The .50 BMG round was used as a sniper round as early as the Korean War. Several world records for the longest confirmed kills were set with the .50 BMG. Eventually, purpose-built sniper rifles were developed specifically for this round.

In addition to long-range and anti-materiel, the U.S. military uses .50 BMG weapons to detonate unexploded ordnance from a safe distance. It can disable most unarmored and lightly armored vehicles.

Some civilians use .50 caliber rifles for long-range target shooting: the US-based Fifty Caliber Shooters Association holds .50 BMG shooting matches.

== Cartridge dimensions ==
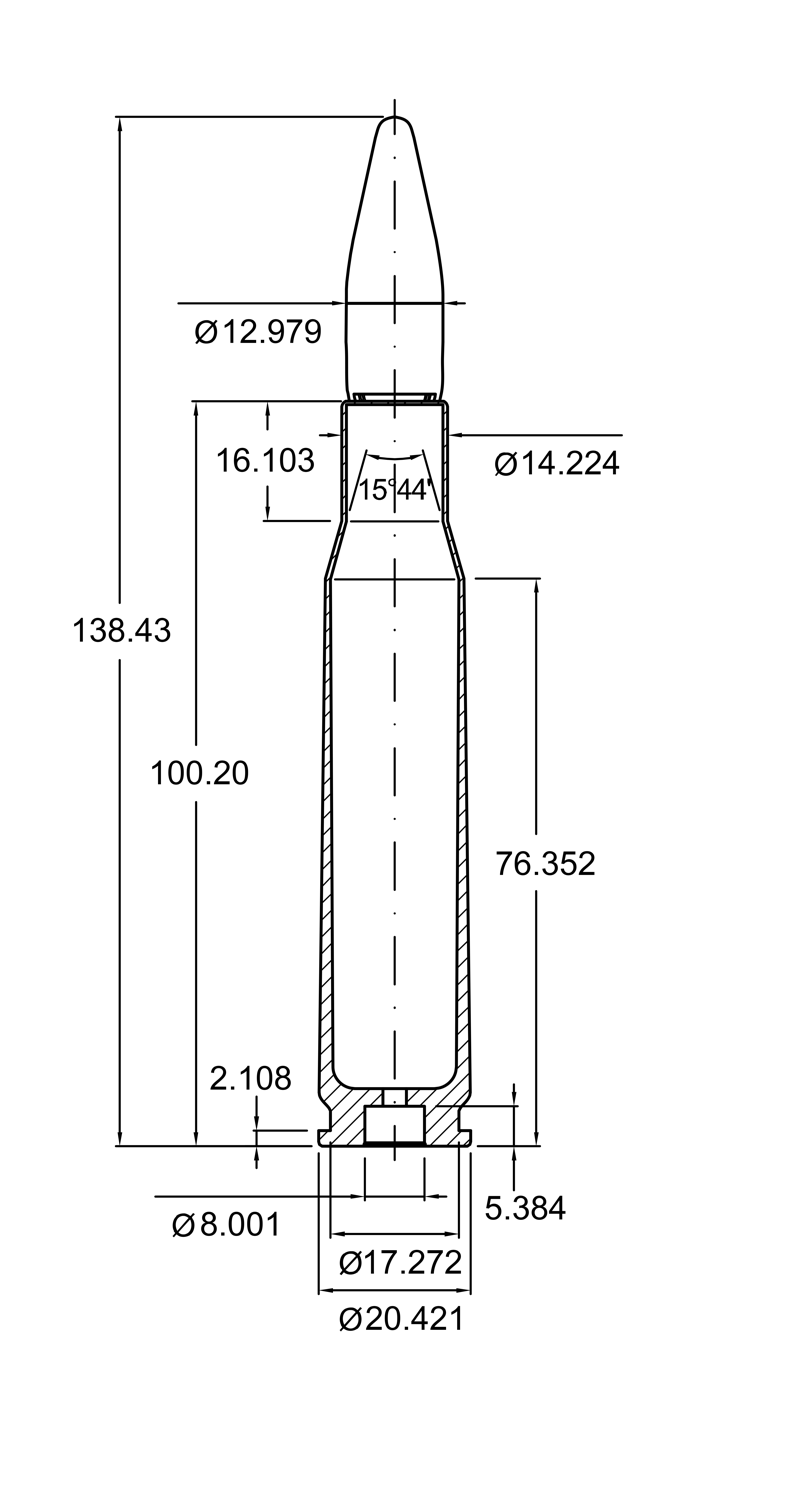
12.7 × 99mm NATO cartridge dimensions in inches	12.7 x 99mm NATO dimensions converted to millimeters

The .50 BMG (12.7 × 99mm NATO) cartridge has a capacity of 290 gr (19 g). The round is a scaled-up version of the .30-06 Springfield but uses a case wall with a long taper to facilitate feeding and extraction in various weapons.

The common rifling twist rate for this cartridge is 1 in 15 in (380 mm), with eight lands and grooves. The primer type specified for this ammunition is a boxer primer with a single centralized ignition point (in the U.S. and NATO countries). However, some other countries produce the ammunition with Berdan primers that have two flash holes.

The average chamber pressure in this round as listed in TM43-0001-27, the U.S. Army Ammunition Data Sheets — Small Caliber Ammunition, not including plastic practice, short cased spotter, or proof/test loads, is 54,923 psi (378,680 kPa). The proof/test pressure is listed as 65,000 psi (450,000 kPa).

== Power ==
A common method for understanding the actual power of a cartridge is the comparison of muzzle energies. The .30-06 Springfield, the standard caliber for American soldiers in both World Wars and a popular caliber amongst American hunters for medium to large game animals, can produce muzzle energies between 2,000 and 3,000 foot-pounds force (3,000 and 4,000 J). The .50 BMG round can produce between 10,000 and 15,000 foot-pounds force (14,000 and 20,000 J), depending on its powder and bullet type, as well as the weapon it is fired from. Due to the high ballistic coefficient of the bullet, the .50 BMG's trajectory also suffers less "drift" from crosswinds than smaller and lighter calibers, making the .50 BMG a good choice for high-powered sniper rifles.

== Military cartridge types ==
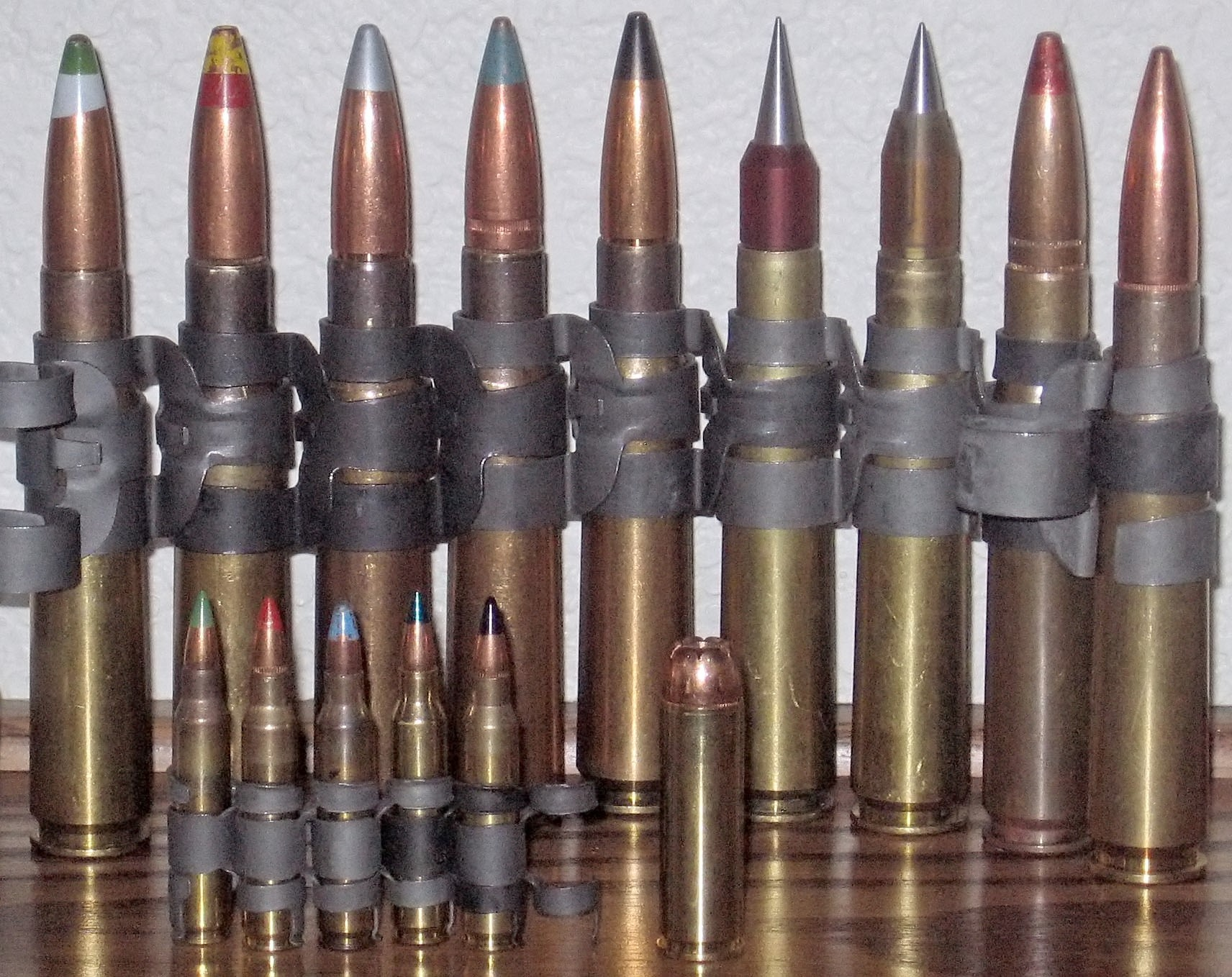
Left to right, rear: green/gray tip Raufoss Mk 211 HEIAP (high-explosive incendiary armor-piercing) yellow/red tip (M48 spotter) silver tip (M8 armor-piercing incendiary) light blue tip (M1 incendiary) black tip (M2 armor piercing) silver tip/red sabot (M962 SLAP-T) silver tip/amber sabot (M903 SLAP) red tip (M17 tracer) unpainted copper (M33 ball) Front row are 5.56 × 45mm NATO and .500 S&W Magnum, for size comparison

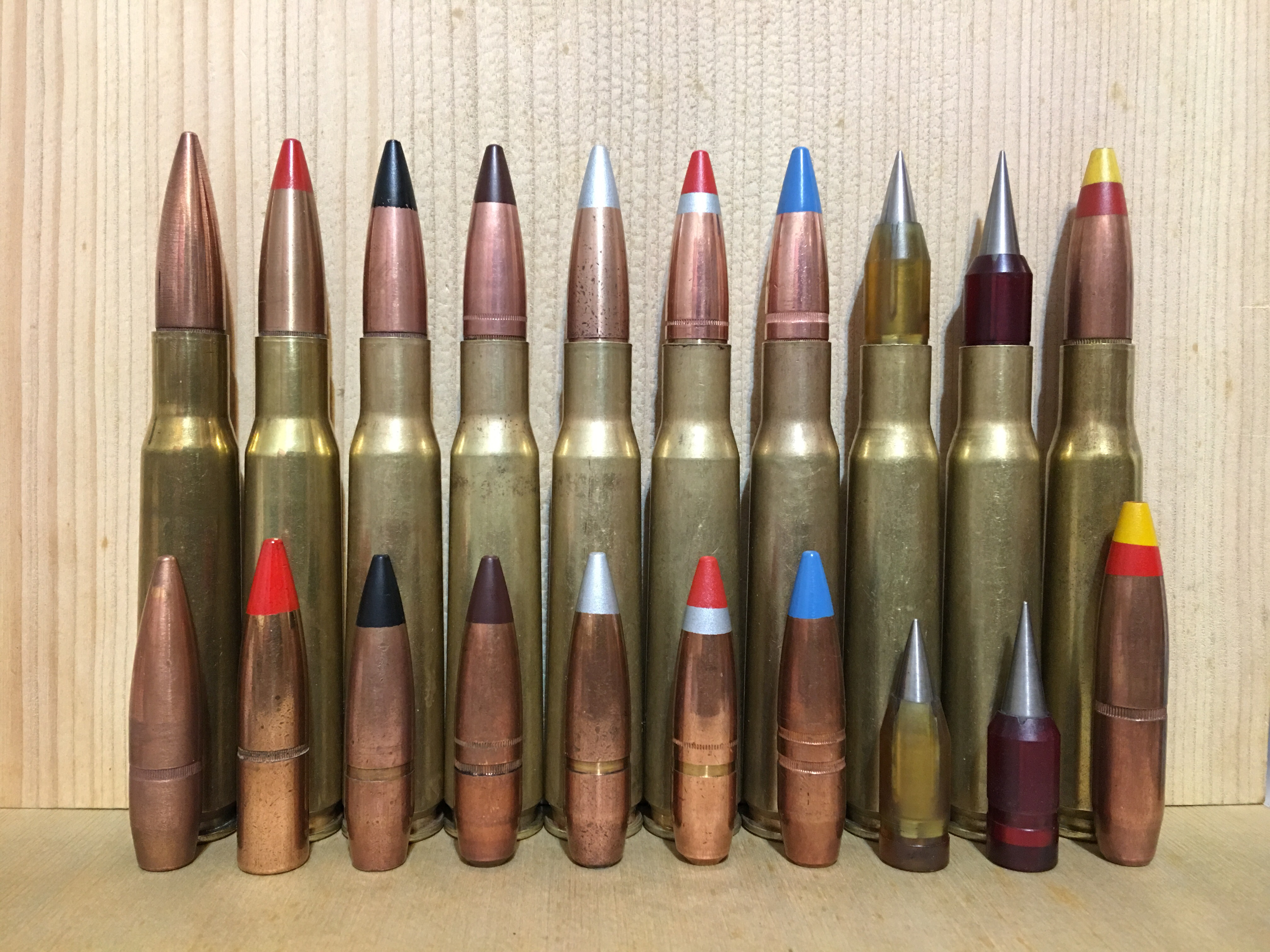
.50 BMG rounds and projectiles. Left to right: M2 ball; M1 tracer; M2 armor piercing; M17 tracer; M8 armor-piercing incendiary; M20 armor-piercing incendiary tracer; M1 incendiary; M903 SLAP; M962 SLAP-T; XM156 spotter tracer

The .50 BMG cartridge is also produced commercially in a wide range of specifications, including armor-piercing, tracing, and incendiary:

Cartridge, caliber .50, tracer, M1
This tracer is used for observing fire, signaling, target designation, and incendiary purposes. This bullet has a red tip.
Cartridge, caliber .50, incendiary, M1
This cartridge is used against unarmored, flammable targets. The incendiary bullet has a light blue tip.
Cartridge, caliber .50, ball, M2
This cartridge is used against personnel and unarmored targets. This bullet has an unpainted tip.
Cartridge, caliber .50, armor-piercing (AP), M2
This cartridge is used against lightly armored vehicles, protective shelters, and personnel, and can be identified by its black tip.
Cartridge, caliber .50, armor-piercing incendiary (API), M8
This cartridge is used, in place of the armor-piercing round, against armored, flammable targets. The bullet has a silver tip.
Cartridge, caliber .50, dim tracer, M10
Tracer for observing fire, signaling, target designation, and incendiary purposes. Designed to be less intense for the first 100 yards and then become bright out to 1,600 yards. It was originally designed for use by aircraft to prevent loss of night vision and to conceal the aircraft's position in flight. The M10 has an orange tip.
Cartridge, caliber .50, tracer, M17
Tracer for observing fire, signaling, target designation, and incendiary purposes. Can be fired from the M82/M107 series of rifles. The M17 has a brown tip.
Cartridge, caliber .50, armor-piercing incendiary tracer (API-T), M20
This cartridge is used in place of the armor-piercing round against armored, flammable targets, with a tracer element for observation purposes. It is effectively a variant of the M8 armor-piercing incendiary with the added tracer element. Can be fired from the M82/M107 series of rifles. This bullet has a red tip with a ring of aluminum paint.
Cartridge, caliber .50, tracer, head light, M21
Tracer bullet with a bright white tracer element for use in observing fire during air-to-air combat. Designed to dazzle attacking aircraft (like oncoming headlights), the M21 is three times more brilliant than the M1 tracer because it used a pure igniter chemical filler. The bullet had a red tip; its packaging was marked Tracer (H.L.) to tell it apart from the standard M1 tracer.
Cartridge, caliber .50, incendiary, M23
This cartridge is used against unarmored, flammable targets. The tip of the bullet is painted blue with a light blue ring.
Cartridge, caliber .50, ball, M33
This cartridge is used against personnel and unarmored targets. Can be fired from the M82/M107 series of rifles.
Cartridge, caliber .50, saboted light armor penetrator (SLAP), M903
This cartridge has a 355–360 gr (23.0–23.3 g) tungsten penetrator that is sabot-launched at a muzzle velocity of 4,000 feet per second (1,200 m/s). The 0.50 in (12.7 mm) diameter sabot is designed to separate after leaving the muzzle, releasing the 0.30 in (7.62 mm) penetrator. The sabot is injection-molded from a special high-strength plastic and reinforced with an aluminum insert in the base section. The cartridge is identified by an amber sabot (Ultem 1000). Used only in the M2 series of machine guns. This round can penetrate 0.75 in (19 mm) of steel armor at 1,500 yards (1,400 m).
Cartridge, caliber .50, saboted light armor penetrator tracer (SLAP-T), M962
Like the M903, this is a SLAP round, with the only difference being that the M962 also has a tracer element for observing fire, target designation, and incendiary purposes. It has a red plastic sabot for identification and is used only in the M2 series of machine guns.
Cartridge, caliber .50, ball, XM1022
A long-range match cartridge specifically designed for long-range work using the M107 rifle.
Cartridge, caliber .50, M1022 long-range sniper
The .50 caliber M1022 has an olive-green bullet coating with no tip ID coloration. The projectile is of standard ball design. It is designed for long-range sniper training and tactical use against targets that do not require armor-piercing or incendiary effects. It exhibits superior long-range accuracy and is trajectory matched to MK211 grade A. The M1022 is ideal for use in all .50 caliber bolt-action and semi-automatic sniper rifles. The bullet remains supersonic from 1,640 yd (1,500 m) to 1,750 yd (1,600 m).

Raufoss Mk 211 Mod 0 HEIAP projectile

Cartridge, caliber .50, high-explosive incendiary armor-piercing (HEIAP), Mk 211 Mod 0
A "combined effects" cartridge, the Raufoss Mk 211 Mod 0 HEIAP cartridge contains a .30 caliber tungsten penetrator, zirconium powder, and Composition A explosive. It can be used in any .50-caliber weapon in the U.S. inventory, except the M85 machine gun. A green tip with a gray ring identifies the cartridge.
Cartridge, caliber .50, armor-piercing incendiary dim tracer (API-DT), Mk 257
The .50 caliber Mk 257 API-DT has a purple bullet tip. The bullet has a hardened-steel core and an incendiary tip. It is used in the M2, M3, and M85. Dim tracer reduces the possibility of the weapon being located during night fire and is visible only with night-vision devices.
Cartridge, caliber .50, armor-piercing (AP), Mk 263 Mod 2
The .50-caliber Mk 263 has a black tip. The bullet has a hardened-steel core and features double valleys to reduce bearing surface, thereby decreasing friction and increasing stability. It is used in the M2, M3, and M85.
Cartridge, caliber .50, armor-piercing incendiary tracer (API-T), Mk 300 Mod 0
As per the Mk 211 Mod 0, but with a tracer component.
Cartridge, caliber .50, armor-piercing explosive incendiary (APEI), Mk 169 Mod 2
This cartridge is used against hardened targets such as bunkers, for suppressive fire against lightly armored vehicles, and ground and aerial threat suppression. It is generally fired either from pilot-aimed aircraft-mounted guns or anti-aircraft platforms, both produced by FN Herstal. It is identified by a gray over yellow tip. A tracer variant of it also exists.
Cartridge, caliber .50, ball, Mk 323 Mod 0
Created by the Naval Surface Warfare Center Crane Division, this cartridge uses M33 ball projectiles in polymer cases instead of brass. It has a clear polymer case with a standard brass head fused at the bottom. The Mk 323 can be fired from M2HB/M2A1 machine guns and GAU-21/A aircraft guns with the same performance. It gives a 25 percent weight saving over brass-cased ammunition, allowing 40 percent more ammunition to be carried for the same weight. The Mk 323's polymer casing is applied to tracer, AP, API, and SLAP projectiles.

DARPA (Defense Advanced Research Projects Agency) contracted with Teledyne Scientific Company to develop the EXACTO program, including a .50-caliber guided bullet. Videos published by DARPA show the guided bullet diverting to strike a moving target.

== Belt links ==
Three distinct and non-compatible metallic links have been used for the .50 BMG cartridge belts. The M2 and M9 links, "pull-out" designs, are used in the Browning M2 and M3 machine guns. The M15-series metal "push-through" links were used in the M85 machine gun. Pull-out cloth belts were also used at one time, but have been obsolete since 1945.

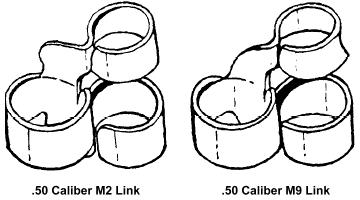
M2 and M9 links

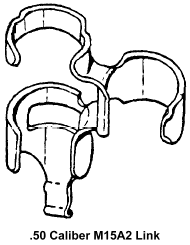
M15A2 link

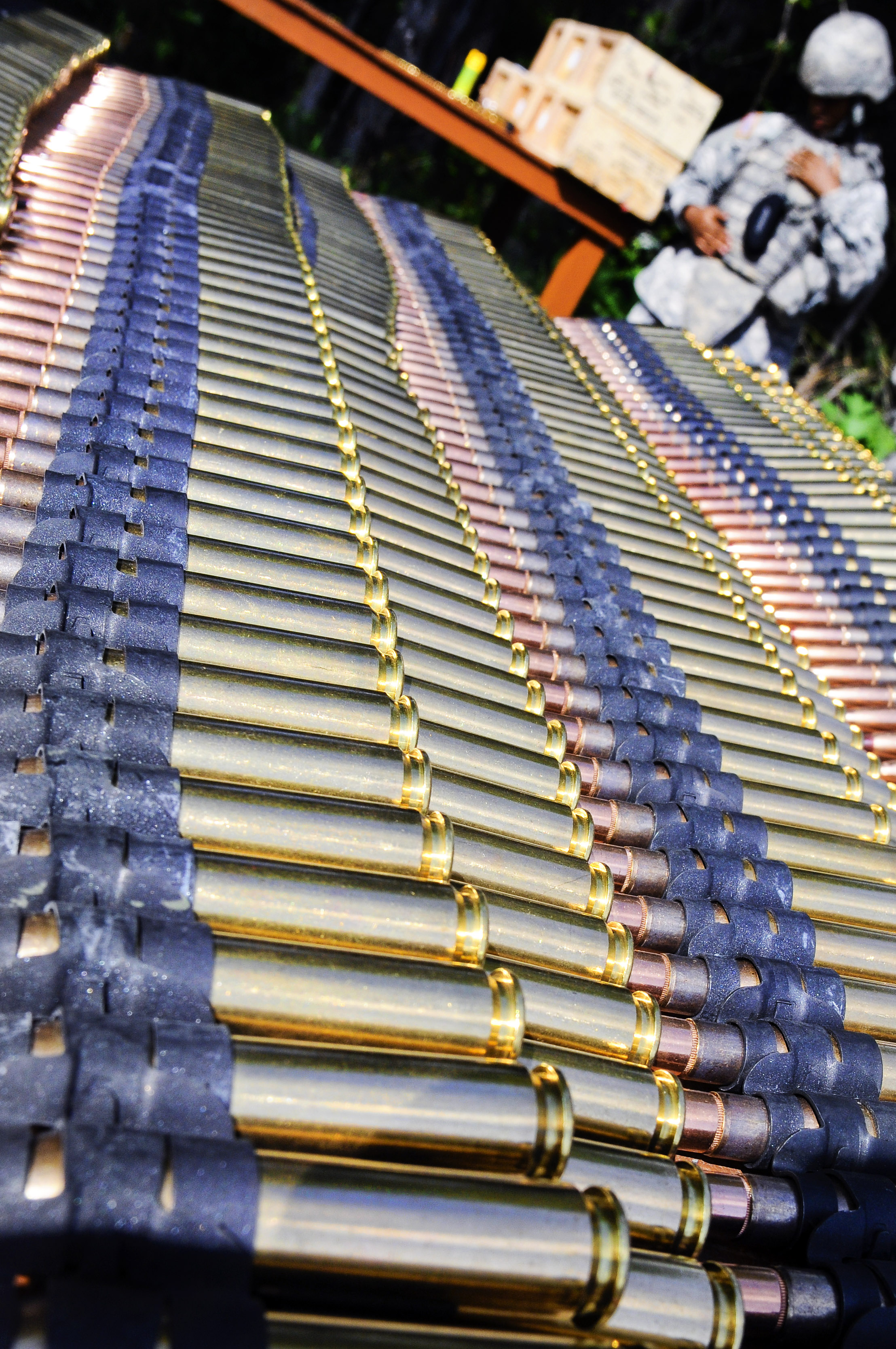
M9 links in use

== Legal issues ==
=== United Kingdom ===
Within the United Kingdom, it is legal to own a bolt-action .50 BMG rifle with a section 1 Firearms Certificate. Applications requesting firearms in this caliber are assessed by the same criteria as smaller calibers, with the applicant having to prove they have a valid reason for owning such a weapon.

=== United States ===
The specified maximum diameter of an unfired .50 BMG bullet is 0.510 inches (13.0 mm); while this appears to be over the .50 inch (12.7 mm) maximum allowed for non-sporting Title I firearms under the U.S. National Firearms Act, the barrel of a .50 BMG rifle is only .50 inch (12.7 mm) across the rifling lands and slightly larger in the grooves. The oversized bullet is formed to the bore size upon firing, forming a tight seal and engaging the rifling. Despite political controversy over the cartridge's great power (it is the most powerful commonly available cartridge not considered a destructive device under the National Firearms Act), it remains popular among long-range shooters for its accuracy and external ballistics. While the .50 BMG round can deliver accurate shot placement (if match grade ammunition is used) at ranges over 1,000-yard (910 m), smaller-caliber rifles produce better scores and tighter groups in 1,000-yard (910 m) competitions.

A 1999 Justice Department Office of Special Investigations briefing on .50 caliber rifle crime identified several instances of the .50 BMG being involved in criminal activities. None of the cited cases has confirmed domestic violent criminal use of a .50 BMG firearm, and a majority of the domestic cases were possession charges.

In the United States, Washington, D.C. disallows registration of .50 BMG rifles, thus rendering civilian possession unlawful. California prohibits the private purchase of a rifle capable of firing the .50 BMG through the .50 Caliber BMG Regulation Act of 2004. Connecticut specifically bans the Barrett 82A1 .50 BMG rifle. However, .50 BMG rifles registered before the enacted bans remain lawful to possess in California and Connecticut. In Illinois, it is legal to possess a .50 caliber rifle only if it was acquired by January 10, 2023, and it was registered with the state police by January 1, 2024. Maryland imposes additional regulations on the sale and transfer of .50 BMG rifles and other weapons classed as "regulated firearms", and limits purchases of any firearm within this class to one per month, but does not impose registration requirements or any form of categorical ban.

Contrary to a persistent misconception within the United States Armed Forces, using .50 BMG directly against enemy personnel is not prohibited by the laws of war. Writing for the Marine Corps Gazette, Major Hays Parks states: "No treaty language exists (either generally or specifically) to support a limitation on [the use of .50 BMG] against personnel, and its widespread, longstanding use in this role suggests that such antipersonnel employment is the customary practice of nations." Parks theorizes that the misconception originated in historical doctrine discouraging the use of the M8C spotting rifle—an integral .50-caliber aiming aid for the M40 recoilless rifle—in the antipersonnel role. This limitation was entirely tactical and intended to hide the vulnerable M40 and its crew from the enemy until the main anti-tank gun was ready to fire; however, Parks concludes that some U.S. troops assumed the existence of a legal limitation on the use of .50-caliber projectiles more generally.

== Partial list of .50 BMG firearms ==
=== Carbines ===
- Barrett M82CQ (a carbine version of the M82A3)

=== Rifles ===
- Accuracy International AS50
- Accuracy International AW50
- Accuracy International AX50
- ArmaLite AR-50
- Arms Tech Ltd. TTR-50
- Barrett M82/M107
- Barrett M95
- Barrett M99
- Bushmaster BA50
- Cadex Defence CDX-50 Tremor
- Desert Tech HTI
- DSR-50
- Gepárd anti-materiel rifle
- McMillan TAC-50
- OM 50 Nemesis
- PGM Hécate II
- Pindad SPR-2
- Ramo M600
- Robar RC-50
- Snipex M
- Snipex Rhino Hunter
- Steyr HS .50
- WKW Wilk
- Zastava M93 Black Arrow

=== Machine guns ===
- GAU-19
- GAU-21 FN M3M
- Kord machine gun - export variant
- M1921 Browning machine gun
- M2 Browning machine gun
- M85 machine gun
- MAC-58 - only built as a prototype
- NSV machine gun - export variant of the original West Kazakhstan Machine Building Company NSV machine gun
- WKM-B - Polish version of the NSV machine gun
- Profense PF 50
- Rolls-Royce Experimental Machine Gun - only built as prototype
- STK 50MG
- XM218
- XM312
- XM806 (LW50)
- Zastava M87 - Serbian export variant of the NSV machine gun

=== Pistols ===
- Triple Action Thunder

== See also ==
- .50 Caliber BMG Regulation Act of 2004
- .50 caliber handguns
- .510 DTC EUROP
- .510 Whisper
- 12 mm caliber
- 12.7 × 108 mm (Russian equivalent)
- 14.5 × 114 mm
- Gun laws in the United States (by state)
- List of firearms
- List of rifle cartridges
- NATO EPVAT testing
- Table of handgun and rifle cartridges
