= Gepárd anti-materiel rifle =

Gepárd
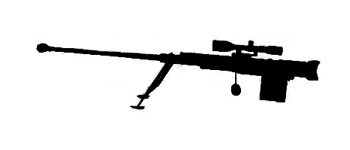
- Gepárd M3
- Type: Bullpup anti-materiel rifle
- Place of origin: Hungarian People's Republic

Service history
- In service: 1990–present
- Used by: See Users

Production history
- Designer: Engineer Major Ferenc Földi
- Designed: 1987–1990
- Manufacturer: Sero International Kft.
- Produced: 1991–present
- No. built: 123 M1, M1A1, M1A2; over 200 M1-M6
- Variants: M1A1, M1A2, M2/M2A1, M3, M4, M5, M6

Specifications
- Mass: 17.5 kg (39 lb)
- Length: 157 cm (62 in)
- Barrel length: 110 cm (43 in)
- Cartridge: 12.7×108mm B32, .50 BMG, 14.5×114mm (M3)
- Caliber: 12.7mm/14.5mm
- Action: M1 Single shot 12.7×108mm and .50 BMG; M2 Semi-automatic 12.7×108mm and .50 BMG; M3 Semi-automatic 14.5×114mm M4 Semi-automatic 12.7×108mm and .50 BMG; M5 Bolt-action 12.7×108mm and .50 BMG; M6 Semi-automatic 12.7×108mm and .50 BMG
- Muzzle velocity: 900 m/s (3,000 ft/s) (.50 BMG); 860 m/s (2,800 ft/s) (12.7×108mm); 1,000 m/s (3,300 ft/s) (14.5 mm)
- Effective firing range: 2,000 m (6,600 ft)
- Maximum firing range: 2,500 m (8,200 ft)
- Feed system: M1: Single-shot; M2, M3, M4, M6: Semi-automatic 5-round detachable box magazine M5: Bolt-action 5-round detachable box magazine
- Sights: 12× scope

The Gepárd family of anti-materiel rifles (meaning cheetah in Hungarian) are a family of Hungarian weapons manufactured by Sero International Kft. designed to destroy unarmored and lightly armored targets. These long-range large-caliber rifles have high accuracy and muzzle velocity. In 1987, the Hungarian People's Army sought to obtain a compact, mobile weapon that could damage lightly armored targets. The project, led by Ferenc Földi (Institute of Military Technology of the Hungarian People's Army), culminated in the creation of the Gepárds.

== Description ==
The production history of the Gepárd was bumpy, since it was designed and prototyped at the end of communist rule and first production runs happened during the early-1990s, as Hungary transitioned to a market economy. Early examples were assembled at the Vízgépészeti Vállalat (Hydrotechnic State Company).

Production and development of Gepárd currently happens at Báthory-Épszolg Kft. (GM6 is manufactured by Sero International Kft.), which also produces the new "Szép" bolt-action sniper rifle in 7.62×51mm for Hungarian army and anti-terrorist police units. This smaller, standard caliber sniper rifle owes a lot of design elements to the Gepárd, since its designer, Ferenc Szép, also participated in development of the Gepárd guns.

=== Gepárd M1 ===
The M1 was the first Gepárd rifle to enter service. It featured a long barrel for increased accuracy, a skeleton stock to reduce weight, and used the heavy 12.7×108mm cartridge. However, the rifle was complicated to reload. The M1 fired only one shot and would then have to be manually reloaded. To do this, the user had to rotate, pull back, remove the grip assembly (whose shape resembles a signal-flare handgun), and insert another cartridge. This tedious task took time to master and slowed the weapon's rate of fire. Other difficulties such as high recoil also plagued the M1. The recoil problem was solved with the addition of a barrel that recoiled back after each shot. The design was inspired by artillery cannons, which face the same impediment. Still, the Gepárd rifles need specially made, high-strength telescopic gunsights. Improvements, such as the addition of a carrier/lafette backpack and a longer barrel, led to the M1A1 variant, but at 21 kg (46 lb) its combat weight was deemed excessive.

The M1 was essentially a sniper weapon, not primarily intended for military field application, but for anti-terrorist police and special forces' use, who operate on the "one shot, one kill" principle. The single shot action was designed to reduce the number of moving parts and allow for extreme precision, five hits out of five shots fit in a 25 cm (9.8 in) radius circle at 1,300 m (4,300 ft). Yet, the Hungarian army decided to purchase 25 rifles of the Gepárd M1 type for use as an in-the-field materiel destruction rifle, but did not purchase any of the later variants so far. Owing to the great weight of Gepárd M1, sharpshooters were instructed to abandon the weapon if forced to retreat quickly and only save the grip assembly for proof, rendering the gun useless.

=== Gepárd M2 ===
A semi-automatic version of the M1 was later produced. Dubbing it the M2, designers reduced its barrel length and weight. An even shorter paratrooper variant dubbed M2A2 made it more favorable to airborne forces and special forces, especially because it could be fired from the hip, thanks to the advanced recoil mechanism. A fiber optic technology scope and eyepiece imaging system was developed (or at least proposed) to allow use of a hip-fired M2A2 for VIP protection purposes.

=== Gepárd M3 ===
Although the 12.7×108mm was considered one of the most powerful, Fellegi decided it was not good enough. He then ordered the development of the M3, with a larger 14.5×114mm. With this new destructive capability also came increased accuracy and range, making the M3 the most popular of the Gepárd rifles.

The M3 is strictly an anti-materiel rifle, because while the 14.5mm round is extremely powerful, its accuracy degrades rapidly at ranges beyond 1,000 m (3,300 ft). Its high destructive power is efficient in taking out hovering helicopters, APCs or mobile radar stations.

=== Gepárd M4 ===
The M4 sought to become an improvement on the M2, with stronger materials and better reliability. The new version have a more rectangular look and are usually of blackened steel finish, while M1, M2, and M3 were usually painted olive-green colour.

The M4 is a semi-automatic anti-materiel rifle. The 10-round drum magazine, so characteristic of the M2 and M3, was replaced with a straight box magazine design with a capacity for five rounds. The later guns can fire either Russian or NATO 12.7 mm ammunition as the gun barrel is field replaceable.

=== Gepárd M5 ===
Akin to the M4 on the M2, the M5 sought to become an improvement on the M1, with stronger materials and better reliability, featuring a more rectangular look, etc.

Like the M1, the M5 is a bolt-action rifle for military sharpshooters and weighs only 13 kilograms. The 10-round drum magazine, so characteristic of the M2 and M3, was replaced with a straight box magazine design with a capacity for five rounds. The later guns can fire either Russian or NATO 12.7 mm ammunition as the gun barrel is field replaceable.

=== Gepárd M6 (GM6 Lynx) ===
Reciprocating barrel of the Gepárd M6 Hiúz

Finally, the Gepárd rifle family concluded with the M6, now called "GM6 Lynx". This rifle used the 12.7×108mm and .50 BMG rounds, like the M2 and M4, but featured stronger parts, lighter weight, shorter length and an improved scope.

== Variants ==
- Gepárd M1 – heavy bolt action sniper rifle in 12.7×108mm
  - Gepárd M1A1 – longer barrel
  - Gepárd M1A2 –
- Gepárd M2 – semi-automatic anti-material rifle in 12.7×108mm
  - Gepárd M2A1 –
  - Gepárd M2A2 – shorter paratrooper variant
- Gepárd M3 – semi-automatic anti-material rifle in 14.5×114mm
- Gepárd M4 – improved M2 in 12.7×108mm or 12.7×99mm
- Gepárd M5 – improved M1 in 12.7×108mm or 12.7×99mm
- Gepárd M6 Hiúz / GM6 Lynx – improved semi-automatic anti-material rifle in 12.7×108mm or 12.7×99mm

== Ammunition ==
The M-1, M-1A1, M-2, M-4, M-5, and M-6 rifles all use the 12.7×108mm cartridge as their primary calibre. They can be converted to fire the .50 BMG NATO cartridge. The M-3 rifle only uses the Soviet 14.5×114mm cartridge.

== Users ==
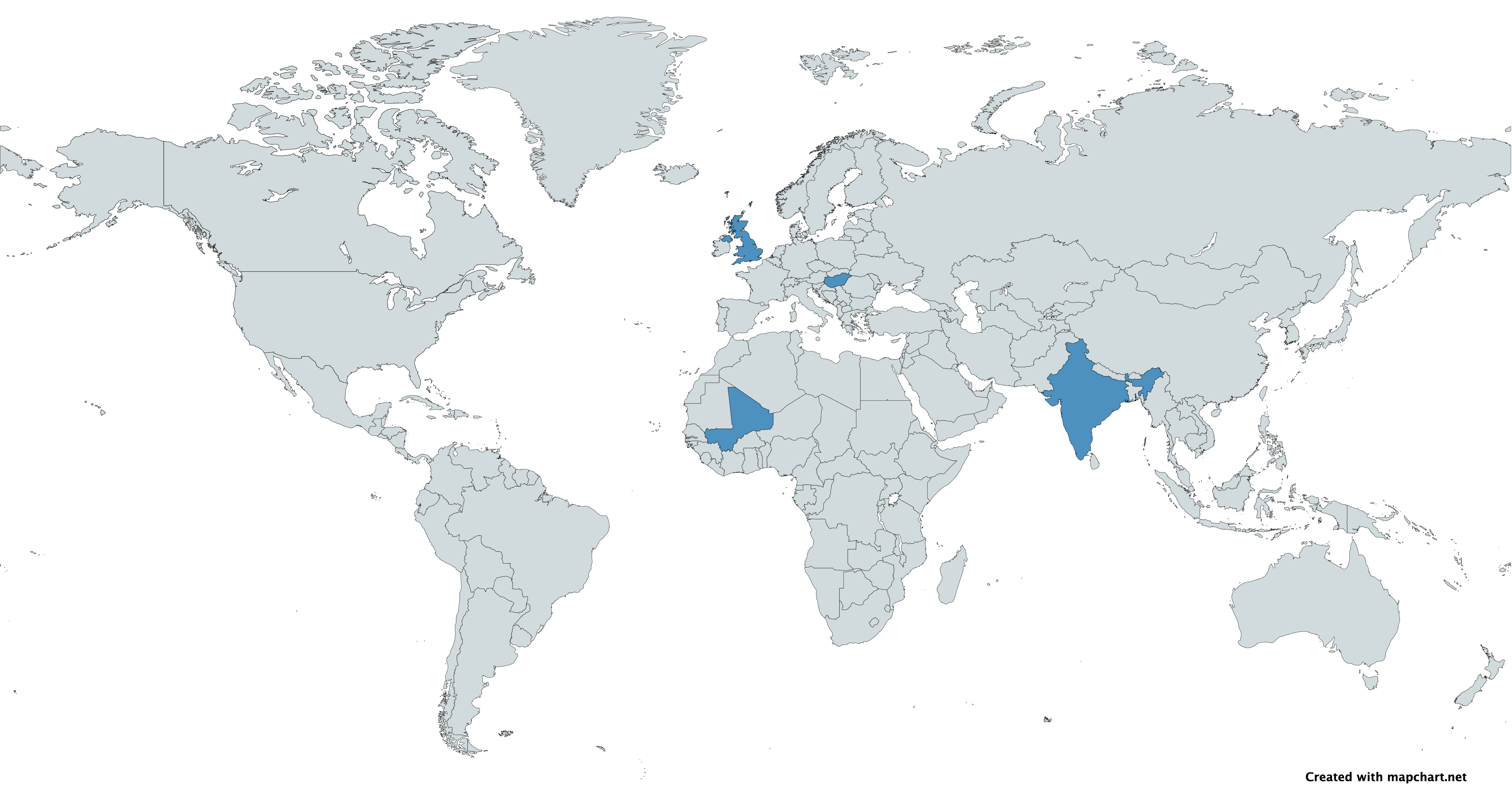
Map with Gepárd anti-materiel rifle users in blue

- Hungary
- India: Indian special forces use the GM6 Lynx.
- Mali: People's Movement for the Liberation of Azawad used M2s.

== See also ==
- Szép (sniper rifle)
- List of bullpup firearms
- List of sniper rifles
- Denel NTW-20
