= Rolls-Royce Experimental Machine Gun =

Gun, Machine, Rolls-Royce, Experimental
- Type: Heavy machine gun
- Place of origin: United Kingdom

Service history
- In service: Prototype only
- Wars: World War II

Production history
- Designed: 1940-42

Specifications
- Calibre: .50 in (12.7 mm)
- Effective firing range: 1,800 m (2,200 yd)

The Rolls-Royce Experimental Machine Gun was a prototype British heavy machine gun, designed by Rolls-Royce during World War II.

Britain wanted to equip aircraft with the Browning M2 .50 caliber machine gun by buying direct from America, but since this was the main heavy caliber machine gun of the U.S. Army and its Air Corps none could be spared for export. Thus Rolls-Royce commenced design of a heavy machine gun in early 1940, intended for use in aircraft. The result was a recoil-operated weapon firing .50 Browning cartridges. This was evaluated in March 1941 and proved prone to stoppages. A revised gas-operated weapon was designed and built to try to solve these problems.

As well as the .50-inch versions, it was planned to modify the gas-operated gun to fire the more powerful .55-inch ammunition used in the Boys anti-tank rifle.

All work on the Rolls-Royce machine guns was abandoned in 1942, by which time supply of the M2 Browning from the U.S.A. had started.
