= Snipex Rhino Hunter =

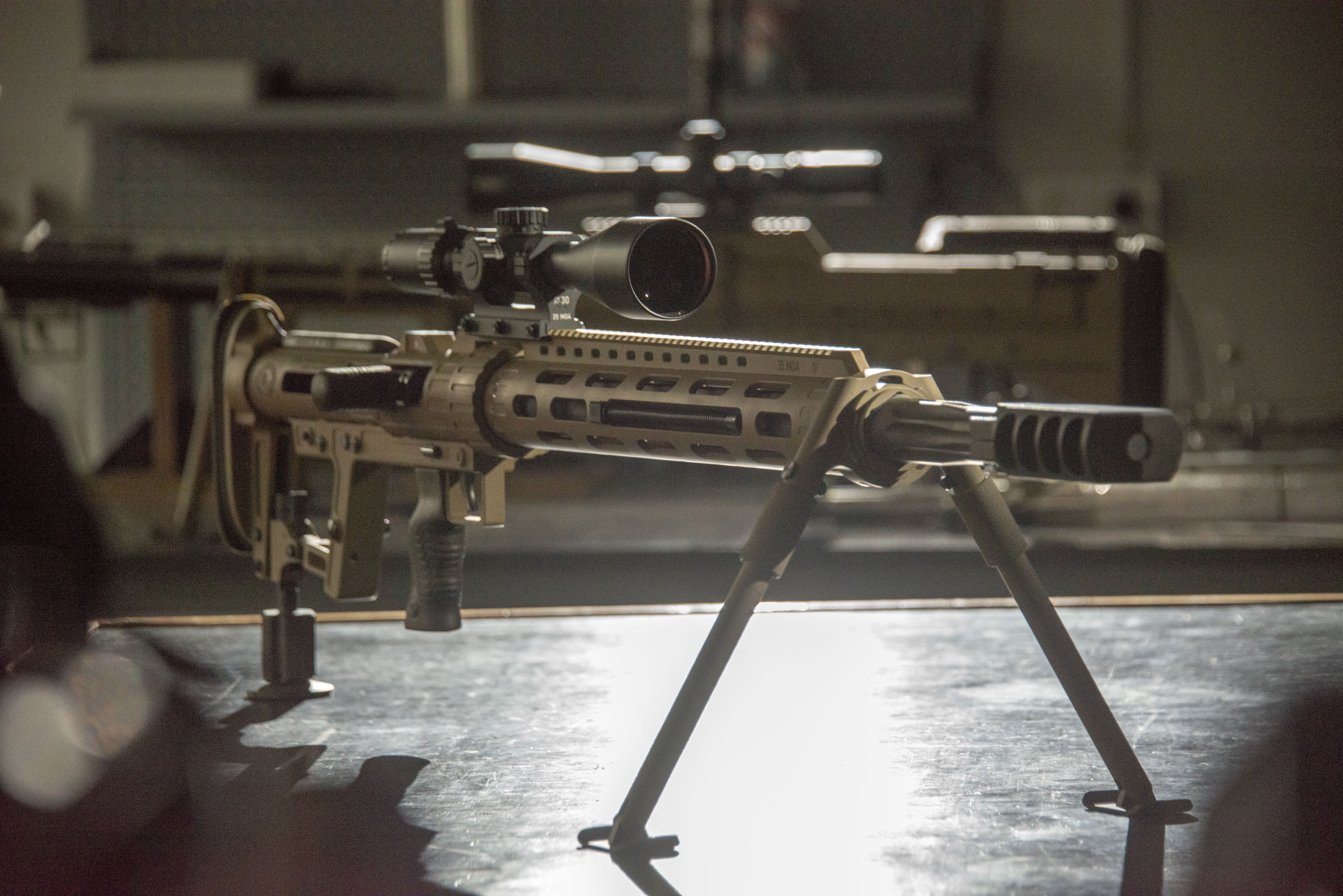
- Type: Bullpup anti materiel rifle
- Place of origin: Ukraine

Production history
- Manufacturer: XADO-Holding Ltd.
- Produced: 2017–present

Specifications
- Mass: 15 kg
- Length: 1250 mm
- Barrel length: 750 mm
- Cartridge: .50 BMG (12.7x99mm)
- Action: Bolt action
- Muzzle velocity: 780 m/s
- Effective firing range: 2000 m
- Feed system: single-shot
- Sights: MIL-STD rail

The Snipex Rhino Hunter is a civilian version of the Snipex M rifle chambered for .50 BMG, developed by the Ukrainian company XADO-Holding Ltd.

== Design ==
The Snipex Rhino Hunter is a bolt-action bullpup with a rotating bolt, and is equipped with a muzzle brake. The bolt has a special flag indicator that allows controlling the degree of bolt locking. For ease of use in the dark, the indicator is made of luminophore.

To reduce recoil, the rifle uses the inertia recoil system, which includes spring-loaded assemblies and hydraulic or spring shock absorbers. The shock absorbers are built into the upper receiver, which allows shooting with the upper receiver set against any surface. Recoil energy is further reduced by to the muzzle brake.

== History ==
The rifle was first presented in October 2016 at the XIII International Specialized Exhibition Arms and Security in Kyiv.

== See also ==
- Snipex T-Rex
