= Bushmaster BA50 Rifle =

- Place of origin: United States

Service history
- Wars: Mexican drug war

Production history
- Manufacturer: Bushmaster
- Unit cost: $5657.25 MSRP

Specifications
- Mass: 13.6 kg (30 lb)
- Length: 1,473.2 mm (58.00 in)
- Barrel length: 762 mm (30.0 in)
- Cartridge: .50 BMG
- Action: Bolt action
- Feed system: 10-round magazine
- Sights: None, MIL-STD-1913 rail

The Bushmaster BA50 is a bolt-action, magazine-fed rifle designed to shoot the .50 BMG cartridge. It has a 22- (carbine) or 30-inch, match grade Lothar Walther free-floating barrel with a 1-in-15-inch twist rate (standard for the .50 BMG cartridge). The rifle weighs 30 pounds (without a magazine or ammunition) and has a muzzle brake to help tame the recoil. Bushmaster literature says that the rifle recoils like a .243 Winchester. The barrel has a MIL-STD-1913 rail (Picatinny style) for mounting a rifle scope.

The BA50 was the original design of Cobb Manufacturing. Bushmaster purchased the design and upgraded it and released it as the Bushmaster BA50.

Bushmaster states that the rifle is capable of shooting 1 minute of angle (MOA) with M33 ball ammunition.

In 2020 Remington, who owns Bushmaster, rebranded the rifle to be released as the "R2Mi."

== Features ==
- Bolt action: bolt is on the left side of the receiver
- Magpul PRS adjustable buttstock with LimbSaver® recoil pad
- High-efficiency recoil-reducing brake minimizes rearward force comparable to .243 Winchester
- Disassembles like an AR-type rifle for cleaning and maintenance
- Rate of twist: 1 in 15″
- MIL-STD-1913 rail at 12 o'clock position on vented fore-end
- Steel bipod with folding legs(M60 style)
- ErgoGrip Deluxe Tactical Pistol Grip
- Lower receiver machined from T6-6061 aluminum billet
- Upper is machined from T6-6061 extrusion with MIL-ST-1913 rail
- Manganese phosphate finish on steel parts
- Hard anodized black finish on aluminum parts (mil-spec)
- Barrel free-floated within vented fore-end

== Users ==
- Mexico
  - Mexican Cartels
