= MAC-58 =

French prototype machine gun

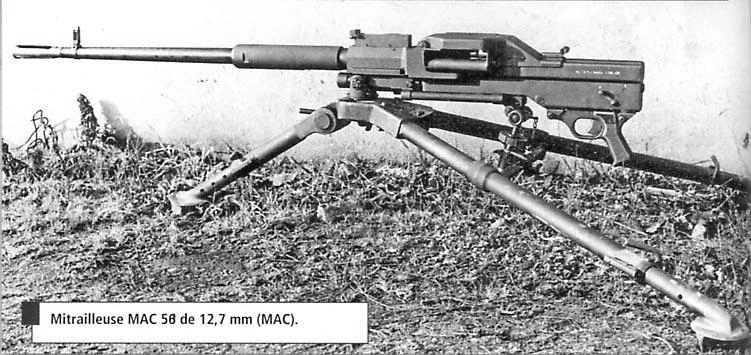
- Type: Machine gun
- Place of origin: France

Production history
- Designed: 1958
- Manufacturer: Manufacture d'armes de Saint-Étienne

Specifications
- Mass: 26 kg (57 lb) (with standard barrel)
- Cartridge: 12.7x99mm NATO
- Caliber: .50
- Action: Lever-delayed blowback
- Rate of fire: 500–600 rpm
- Effective firing range: 600–2,000 m (660–2,190 yd)
- Feed system: Belt
- Sights: Iron

The MAC-58 was a version of the French AA-52 machine gun using .50 BMG instead of 7.62×51mm NATO cartridges. A few prototypes were tested and one was retained for pre-serial production, but it never reached mass production due to the large quantity of American M2 Browning machine guns already in service with the French armed forces.

== Development ==
On September 23, 1950, the Manufacture d'armes de Châtellerault (MAC) began to develop a 12.7 mm machine gun to replace the M2 Browning. Only the caliber of the weapon was specified, with other features being left to the initiative of consulting firms in Mulhouse, Châtellerault and Saint-Étienne.

In Chatellerault, the study was entrusted to a technician under the orders of Chief Engineer Martin and the instigation of directors, BMI and BMI Rabbe Nardin. On February 12, 1956, a dimensional drawing of the weapon was produced and submitted to the technical department of the Direction des études et fabrications d'armement (Directorate of Weapons Manufacture and Study), resulting in the creation of a prototype. The 26-kilogram (57 lb) weapon was inspired by the AA-52 general-purpose machine gun, with a pressed steel shell that necessitated the use of a 3-400 ton press.

=== Specifications ===
Specifications that would meet the 12.7 mm machine gun standard were specified by the MAC. The weapon was required to:

- Be an adaptable and self-portable light machine gun.
- Enable effective fire against helicopters or light aircraft which are at an altitude of 1,000 m (1,100 yd).
- Have an adjustable range of 1,000 to 2,000 m (1,100 to 2,200 yd)
- Be lightweight for easy handling.
- Be easier to maintain and operate than an American 12.7 mm machine gun.
- Use the same types of ammunition as an American 12.7 mm machine gun (particularly armor-piercing ammunition, to allow the MAC-58 to be used in an anti-materiel role).

The MAC was also to provide, by August 25, 1956 at the latest, an information sheet containing the main features of the prototypes, the project status, and the prototype's next testing period to the Institution of Technical Experiments in Versailles. As per a letter from August 23, 1956, the MAC outlined additional specifications in response:

- The prototype is fed from the left and ejects shell casings from the bottom right.
- Effectiveness of air target shooting is to be identical to the 12.7 mm machine gun currently used by light anti-aircraft gunners.
- The shooting ground is set with an APX 806 bezel.
- The weight should be comparable to that of the Hotchkiss Mle 1914 (i.e. 27.5 kg (61 lb) with a heavy barrel).
- The design is to be based on the AA-52, with few differing parts.
- The gun should fire both NATO and French cartridges.
- The gun can be mounted on an M3 tripod via a flexible MAC link.
- The fire rate is to be 500 to 600 rpm.

== Evaluation ==
Two MAC-58 prototypes were presented to the CABA (Commission d'Adoption du Matériel de l'Armée de Terre) on November 30, 1956 and May 28, 1957, respectively. On June 27, 1957, three machine guns were sent for final evaluation. Two copies were for the Technical Section of the Army. The weapon was deemed valid in its presentation and operating principle, but it could not be mounted on all military vehicles in service because of its shape and lack of rear handles. On December 10, 1959, the seventh and eighth prototypes were given to the Ateliers de construction d'Issy-les-Moulineaux for adaptive trials on a circular troop transport vehicle. Ultimately, 12 prototypes were ordered in December 1956, manufactured, and tested. As further development was not considered necessary, the MAC-58 remained a prototype.
