= Szép (sniper rifle) =

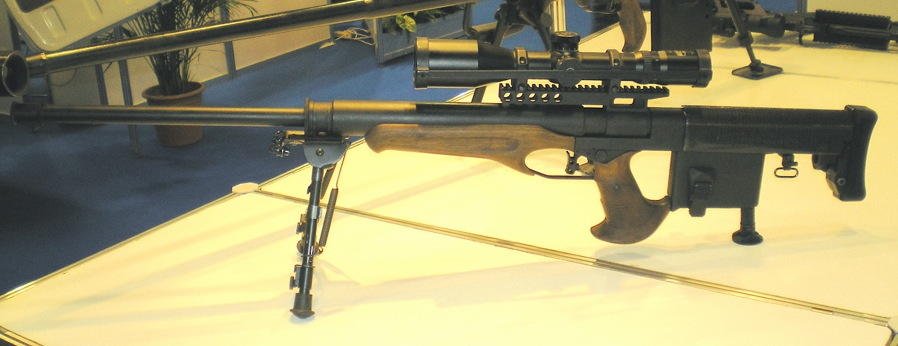
Szép

The Szép is a Hungarian bullpup bolt-action sniper rifle manufactured by Bátori-Épszol Ltd. It's derived from the Gepárd family of anti-material rifles. The main change in concept is the caliber being lowered from 12.7 × 108 mm (.50 caliber) to 7.62 × 51 mm (.30 caliber) for practical sniper use.

The Szep M1 sniper rifle was designed in around 2008 by Hungarian army officer Ferenc Szép for Hungarian army and anti-terrorist police use. Originally named as "Medium-caliber Szép sniping rifle", it was later put into limited production by Hungarian company Bátori-Épszol Ltd.
