= Revitalizant =

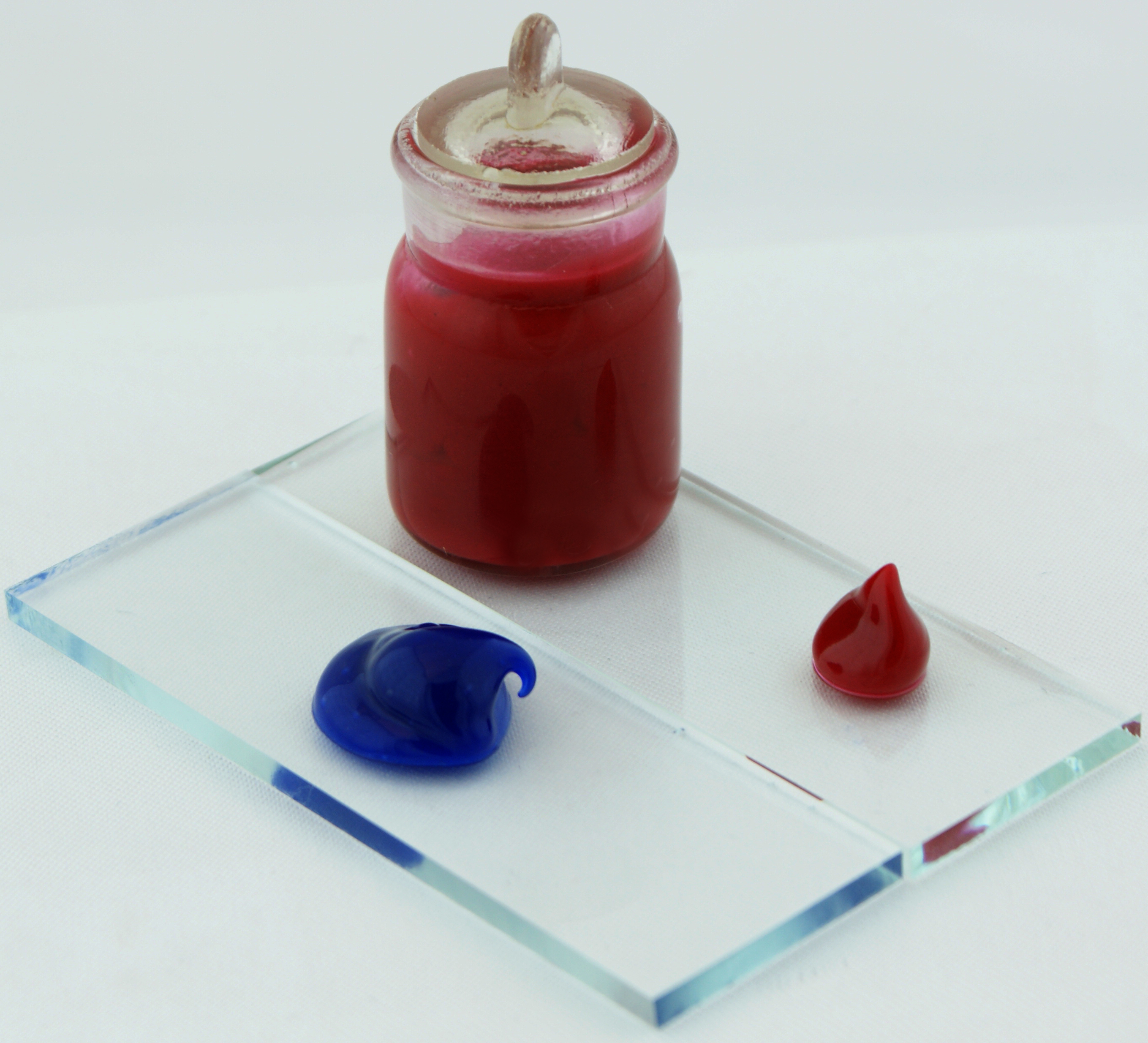
gels-revitalizants

Revitalizant (Latin: vita — life, can be literally translated to “bringing back to life”) is a semi-permanent treatment for metals found in automobile engines, transmissions, fuel pumps, and other friction surfaces in industrial and other machines. The treatment is added to the engine oil, operating fluids, or fuel. The treatment forms a protective cermet or ceramic-metal coating on the friction metal parts of the mechanisms directly during the process of their operation. The Revitalizant solves the problem of non-wear operation of cars and mechanisms.

== History ==
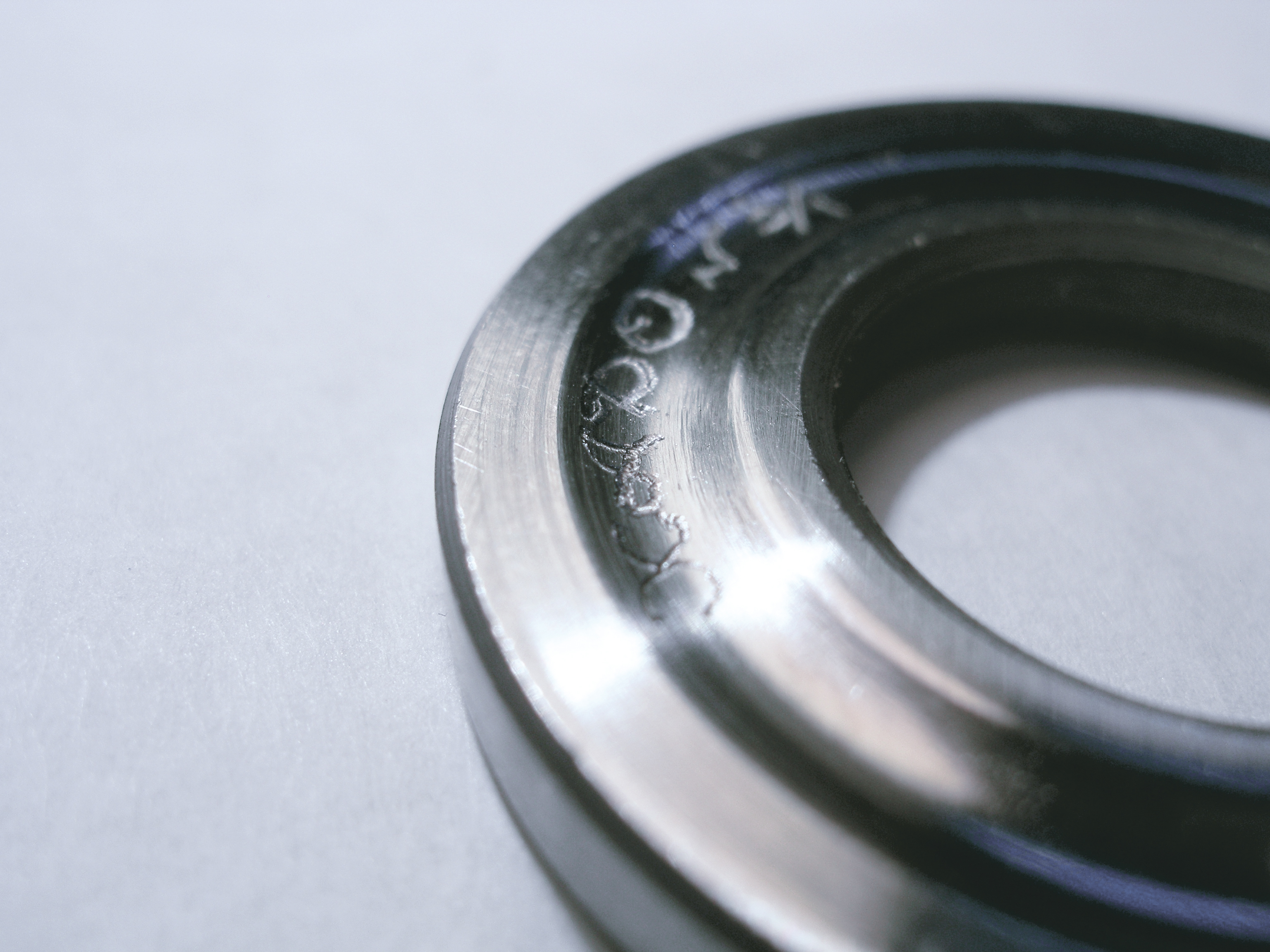
Appearance of the bearing race with a defect made on purpose

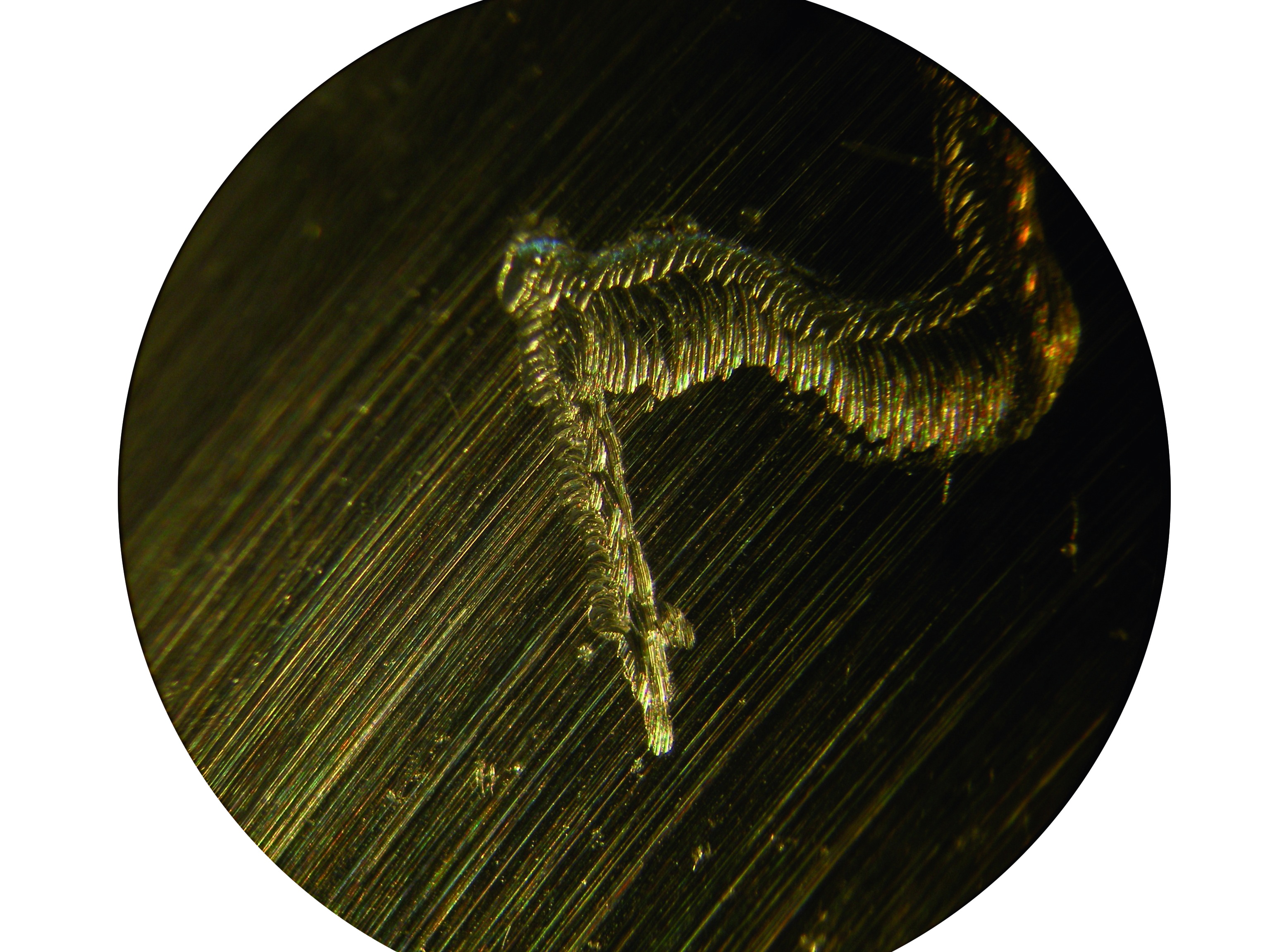
Magnified view of the initial surface of the part

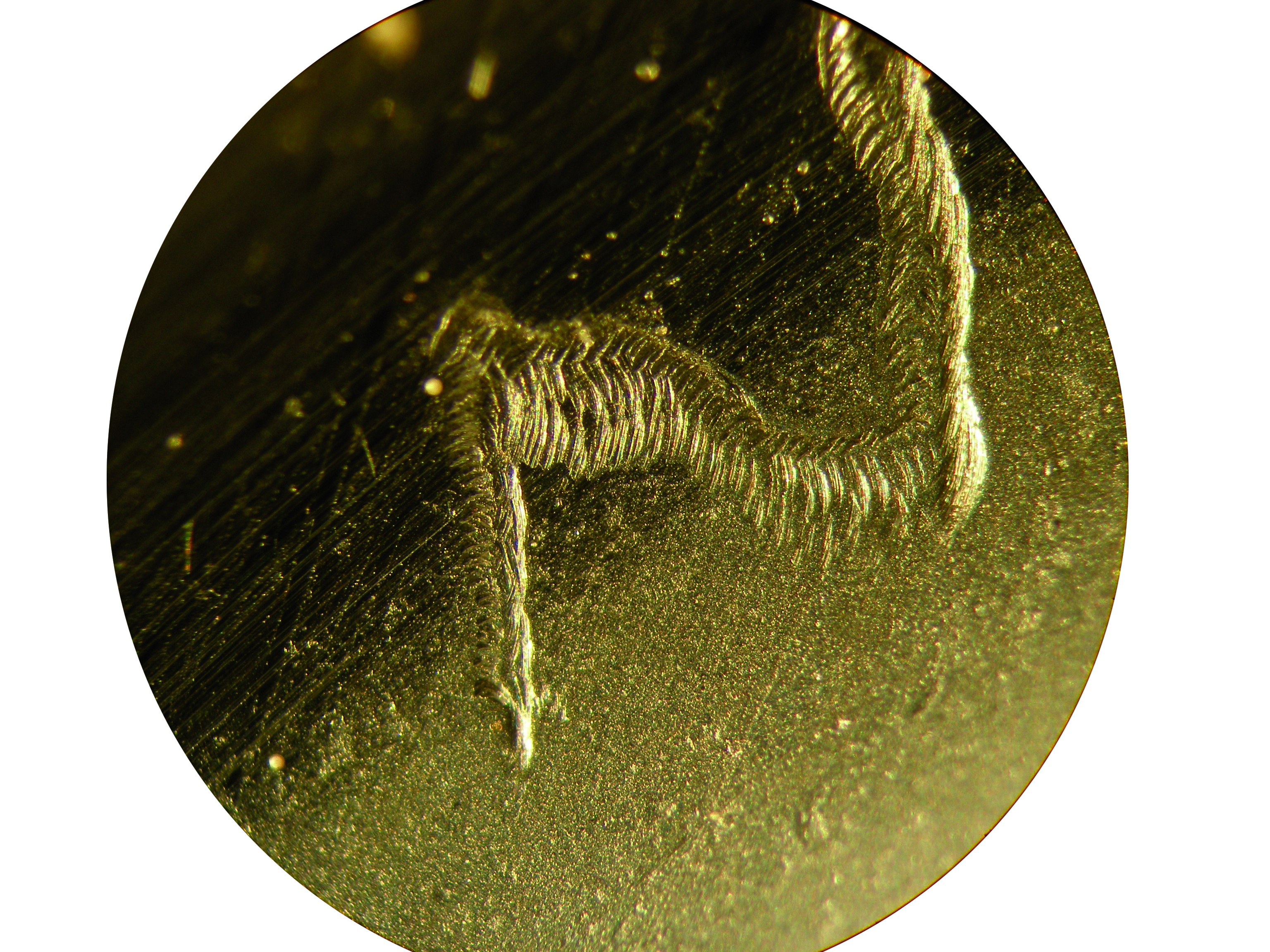
Effect of revitalizant. Modification of the friction surface. Start of defect closing.

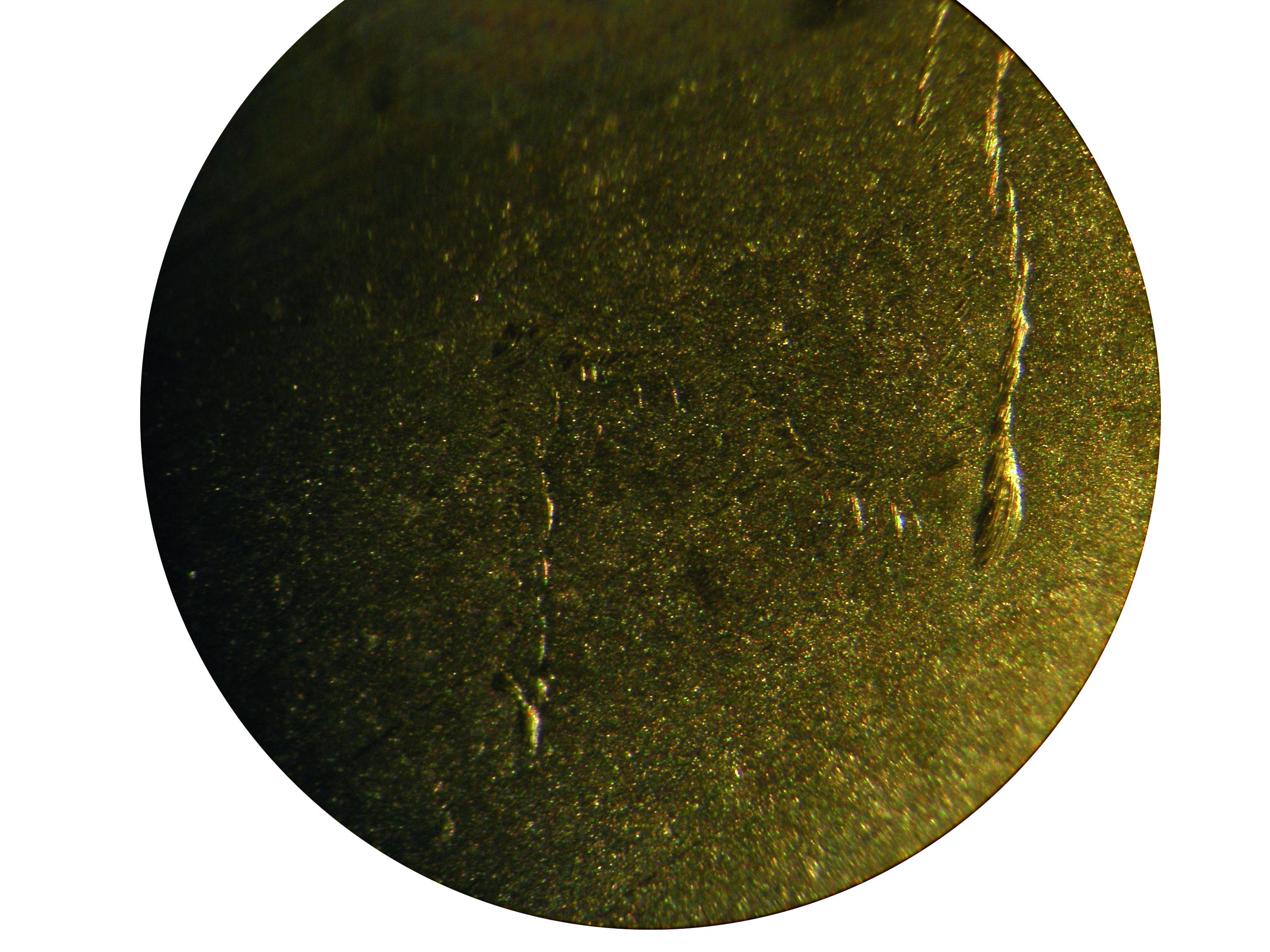
Surface defect eliminated. Detailed information about terms of obtaining the pictures.

The Revitalizant was developed in 1998 in Kharkiv (Ukraine) by XADO. The composition and the method of its preparation are patented. The notion was included in the textbook on tribology.

== Description ==
Visually it is a gel or a plastic substance. It consists of a lubricant and a mixture of oxides and metal oxide hydrates: Al_{2}O_{3} and/or SiO_{2} and/or MgO and/or CaO and/or Fe_{2}O_{3} etc., with dispersion from 100 to 10,000 nanometers.

== Properties ==
- Under certain conditions (pressure and temperature) typical for the contact of the parts during friction, the substances contained in the revitalizant act as a catalyst for creating the metal carbide of coupling materials.

     
  
    
      
        
          n
          M
          e
          +
          m
          C
          →
          M
          
            e
            
              n
            
          
          
            C
            
              m
            
          
        
        ,
      
    
    {\displaystyle \mathrm {nMe+mC\rightarrow Me_{n}C_{m}} ,}
  

     where Me stands for metal; C - carbon.

- Particles of the substance have the form similar to the spherical and during the process of friction they are acting as surface hardening and at the same time as rolling substances, reducing the friction coefficient.

== Process ==
The process of the protective coating formation, called revitalization, is based on physical-chemical interaction between surfaces of the parts on the spots of virtual contact covered with revitalizant in a boundary or mixed lubrication mode. As a result a gradient cermet coating is formed, containing positive compressive stresses all over its depth and concentration of carbon, increasing at the surface (up to the formation of diamond-like structures). Distinctive feature of the process is a hardening of the coating with its simultaneous growth

== Application ==
Used in the manufacture of lubricants, greases and additives.
