= Snipex M =

Snipex M100
- Type: Anti-materiel rifle
- Place of origin: Ukraine

Production history
- Manufacturer: XADO-Holding Ltd.
- Produced: 2017–present

Specifications
- Mass: 16.5 kg
- Length: 1,505 mm
- Barrel length: 1,000 mm
- Cartridge: 12.7×108mm
- Action: rotating bolt
- Muzzle velocity: 850 m/s
- Effective firing range: 2,300 m
- Maximum firing range: 6,800 m
- Feed system: single-shot
- Sights: MIL-STD rail

Snipex M is a long-range single-shot 12.7mm rifle with automatic case ejection. Developed by XADO-Holding Ltd. company (Kharkiv, Ukraine).

== Design ==
The Snipex М rifle is available in two versions. Snipex М75 has a barrel length of 750 mm, and Snipex М100 — a barrel length of 1,000 mm. Both versions are designed taking into account all the requirements for weapons for high-precision shooting. The rifles have the bullpup design. The barrel is fully open, has eight right grooves with a 15-inch twist as well as cannelures. Equipped with a muzzle brake.

Barrel locking is achieved through a rotating bolt. Thirteen bolt lugs are disposed in three rows and can rotate by 60 degrees, which ensures rigid locking of the barrel. Empty cases are ejected automatically when pulling the bolt back. The case ejection process is slightly delayed, which allows the bullet to leave the barrel with the bolt still fully closed. During this time, the maximum amount of energy is transferred to the bullet.

The rifle is equipped with a special grip safety, which is located directly above the pistol grip on both sides of the weapon.

The rifle features a number of special design solutions with regard to the reduction of recoil and the increase of shooting accuracy. Recoil reduction is achieved due to the inertia recoil system, which includes spring-loaded assemblies and hydraulic or spring shock absorbers. The shock absorbers are built into the upper receiver, which allows shooting with the upper receiver set against any surface. Recoil energy is partially reduced due to the muzzle brake.

The rifle is equipped with an original easily foldable bipod designed in such a way that the center of gravity of the rifle is below the bipod mounting point. During shooting, this provides additional stability and precision. The additional rear support allows for quick adjustment to the shooter's needs. The rifle has a Picatinny rail with 35 MOA gradient, on which various sighting devices can be mounted.

== Specifications ==
	Snipex M75	Snipex M100
Caliber, mm	12.7	12.7
Cartridge	12.7 Х 108	12.7 Х 108
Mass, kg	15	16,5
Overall length (assembled), mm	1250	1505
Barrel length, mm	750	1000
Rifling	8/15"	8/15"
Safety	safety button, safety sear	safety button, safety sear
Picatinny rail	top Mil Standard	top Mil Standard
Muzzle velocity, m/s	780	850
Effective range, m	2000	2300
Maximum range, m	6800	6800

== History ==
The prototype of the rifle was presented at the International Specialized Exhibition “ Arms and Security 2016”. A year later, information about the working version of the rifle Snipex M75 appeared, and another year later, Snipex M100 was presented at the exhibition “Arms and Security 2018”.

== See also ==
- Snipex T-Rex
- Snipex Rhino Hunter
