= 14.5 × 114 mm =

Heavy machine gun and anti-material rifle cartridge

14.5×114mm
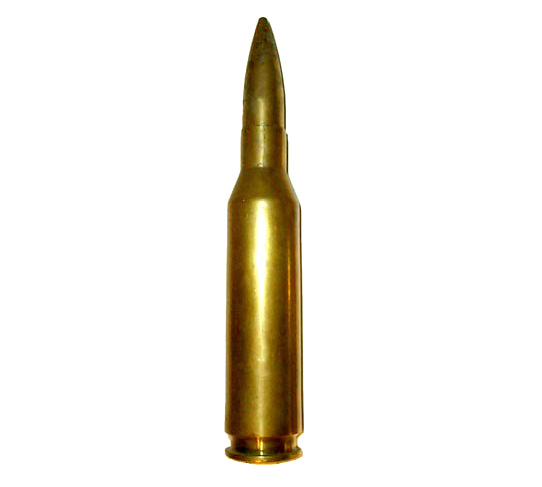
- A 14.5 × 114 mm cartridge
- Type: Anti-tank rifle, anti-materiel rifle, heavy machine gun
- Place of origin: Soviet Union

Service history
- In service: 1941–present
- Used by: Soviet Union and successor states
- Wars: World War II; Soviet–Afghan War; War on terror First Libyan civil war Syrian Civil War and many other conflicts

Production history
- Designed: 1934–1939

Specifications
- Case type: Rimless, bottleneck
- Bullet diameter: 14.88 mm (0.586 in)
- Land diameter: 14.50 mm (0.571 in)
- Neck diameter: 16.5 mm (0.65 in)
- Shoulder diameter: 25.50 mm (1.004 in)
- Base diameter: 26.95 mm (1.061 in)
- Rim diameter: 26.95 mm (1.061 in)
- Rim thickness: 2.5 mm (0.098 in)
- Case length: 114 mm (4.5 in)
- Overall length: 155.80 mm (6.134 in)
- Case capacity: 42.53 cm^{3} (656.3 gr H_{2}O)
- Rifling twist: 455 mm (1 in 17.91 in)
- Maximum pressure: 360 MPa (52,000 psi)

Ballistic performance
Bullet mass/type	Velocity	Energy
59.7 g (921 gr) MDZ HEI	1,000 m/s (3,300 ft/s)	29,850 J (22,020 ft⋅lbf)
60 g (926 gr) ZP Inc.-T	1,000 m/s (3,300 ft/s)	30,000 J (22,000 ft⋅lbf)
64 g (988 gr) B-32 API	1,000 m/s (3,300 ft/s)	32,000 J (24,000 ft⋅lbf)
64.4 g (994 gr) BS AP	1,006 m/s (3,300 ft/s)	32,588 J (24,036 ft⋅lbf)
66.5 g (1,026 gr) KKV	1,000 m/s (3,300 ft/s)	33,250 J (24,520 ft⋅lbf)
59.56 g (919 gr) BZT	1,006 m/s (3,300 ft/s)	30,138 J (22,229 ft⋅lbf)
45 g (694 gr) DGJ02	1,250 m/s (4,100 ft/s)	35,156 J (25,930 ft⋅lbf)
- Test barrel length: 1350 mm (53 inches); Source: Post WWII Ammunition Russian Ammunition Page

The 14.5×114 mm (.57 calibre) is a heavy machine gun and anti-materiel rifle cartridge used by the Soviet Union, the former Warsaw Pact, modern Russia, and other countries.

It was originally developed for the PTRS and PTRD anti-tank rifles, and was later used as the basis for the KPV heavy machine gun that formed the basis of the ZPU series anti-aircraft guns that is also the main armament of the BTR series of armoured personnel carriers from the BTR-60 to the BTR-80 and for heavy anti-materiel sniper rifles.

== Cartridge dimensions ==
The 14.5 × 114 mm has a 42.53 ml (655 grains H_{2}O) cartridge case capacity. The exterior shape of the case was designed to promote reliable case feeding and extraction in bolt-action rifles, semi-automatic rifles, and heavy machine guns alike, under extreme conditions.

14.5 × 114 mm maximum cartridge dimensions. All dimensions in millimetres (mm), but angles may be measured in degrees or degrees-arcminutes-arcseconds (° ′ ″); alpha is 22.5°.

Americans define the shoulder angle at alpha/2 = 22.25°. The most common rifling twist rate for this cartridge is 1 in 455 mm (17.91 in), with 8 grooves, land ⌀ 14.50 mm (0.571 in), and groove ⌀ 14.95 mm (0.589 in). Assuming a muzzle velocity of 1 km/s (0.62 mi/s), as is roughly typical for it, this gives it a muzzle angular frequency of ≈ 131868 rpm (13809 rad/s; 2.198 kHz). According to the official guidelines, the 14.5 × 114 mm case can handle up to 360 MPa (52,213 psi) piezo pressure. In C.I.P. regulated countries every rifle cartridge combo has to be proofed at 125% of this maximum C.I.P. pressure to be certified for sale to consumers.

== Ammunition types ==
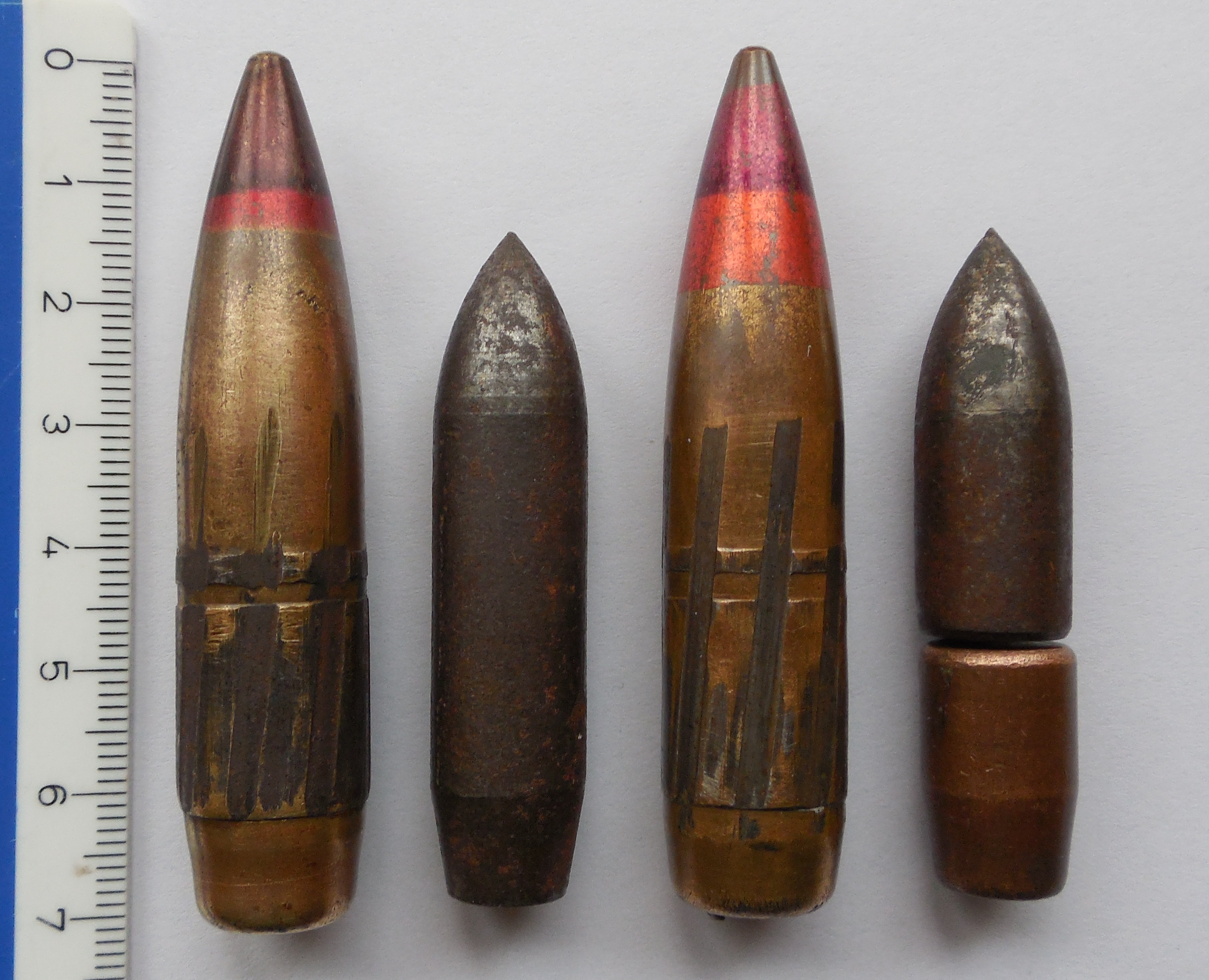
B-32 API projectile on the left, hardened steel core aside. Tip is black with a thin red band below. On the right, BZT API-T projectile with dark red tip and a wide red band below; hardened steel core and tracer cup on its right. Both jackets and the tracer cup are made from copper-washed steel. Between the cores and the jackets there is a layer of lead.

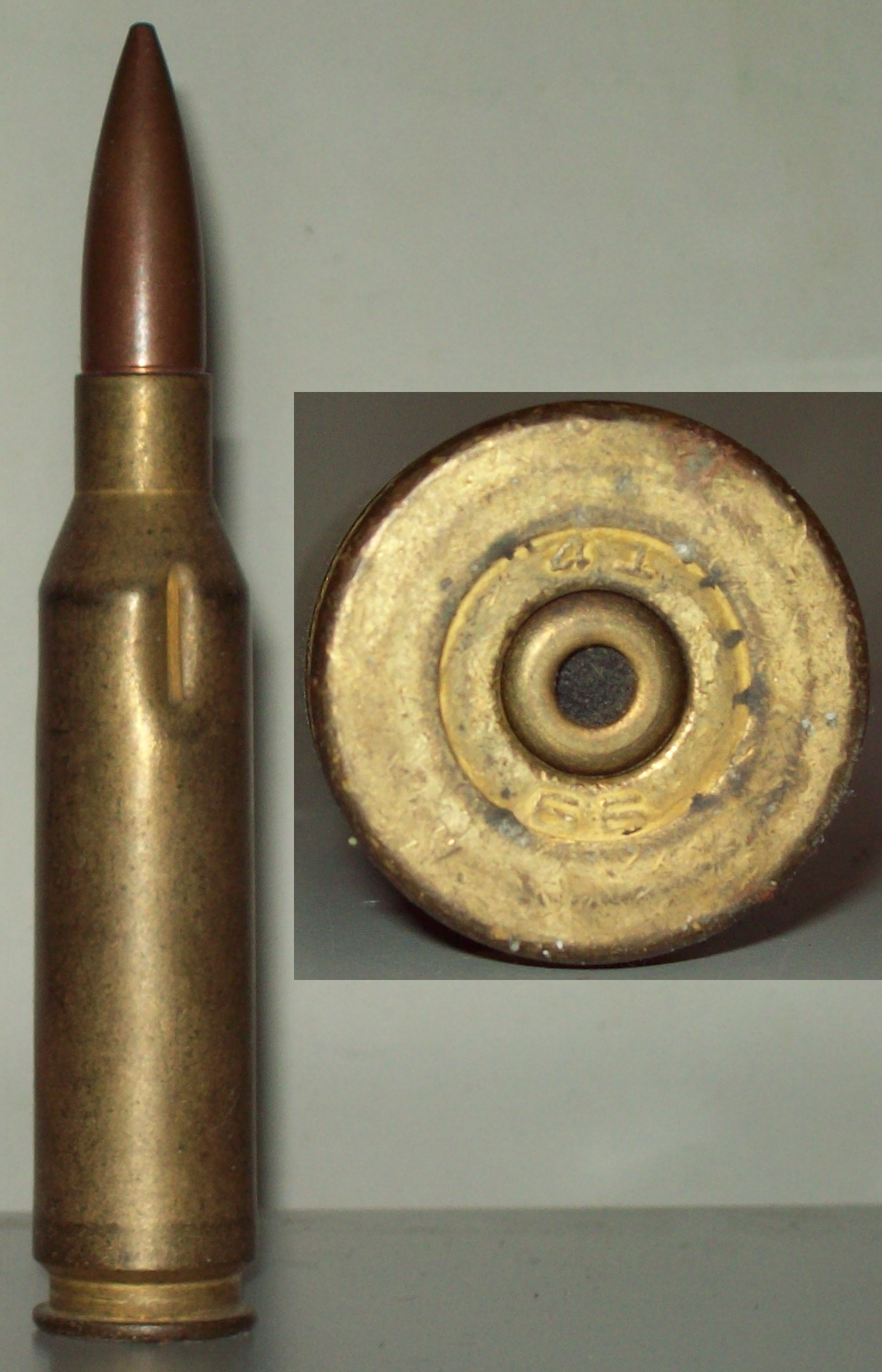
Dummy round

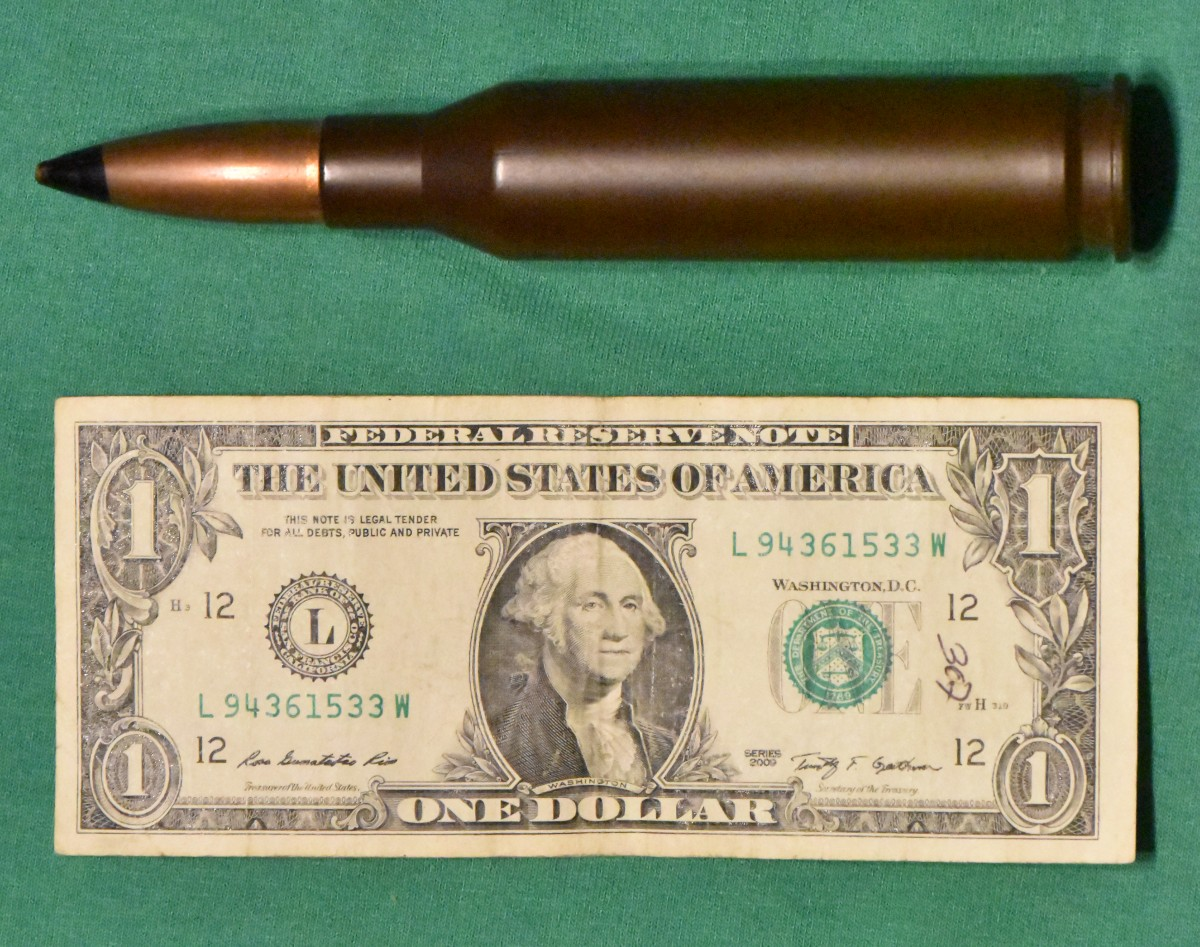
14.5 × 114 round with a US 1 dollar bill for reference

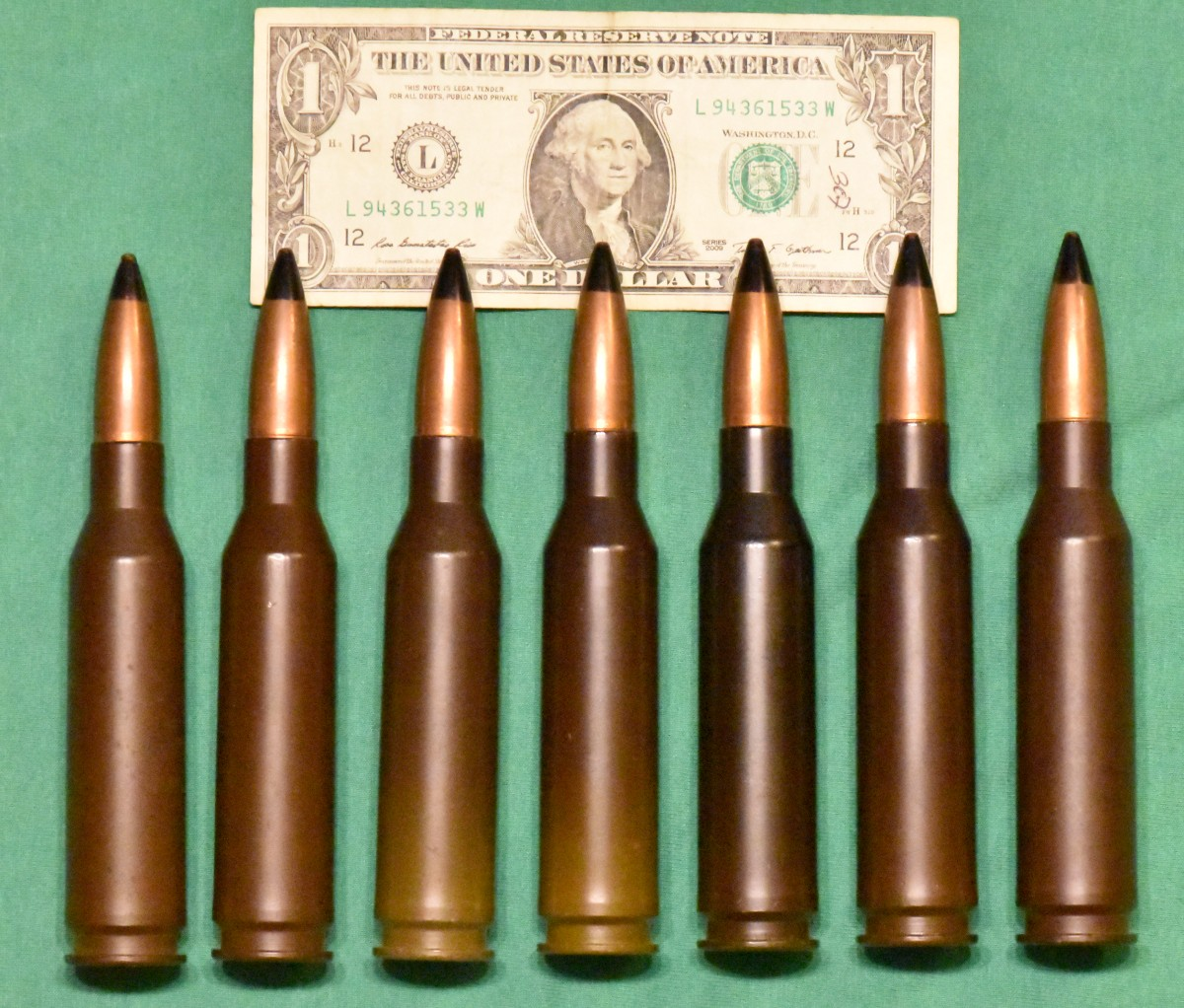
Seven rounds of 14.5 × 114 made in 1981, with a $1 bill for reference

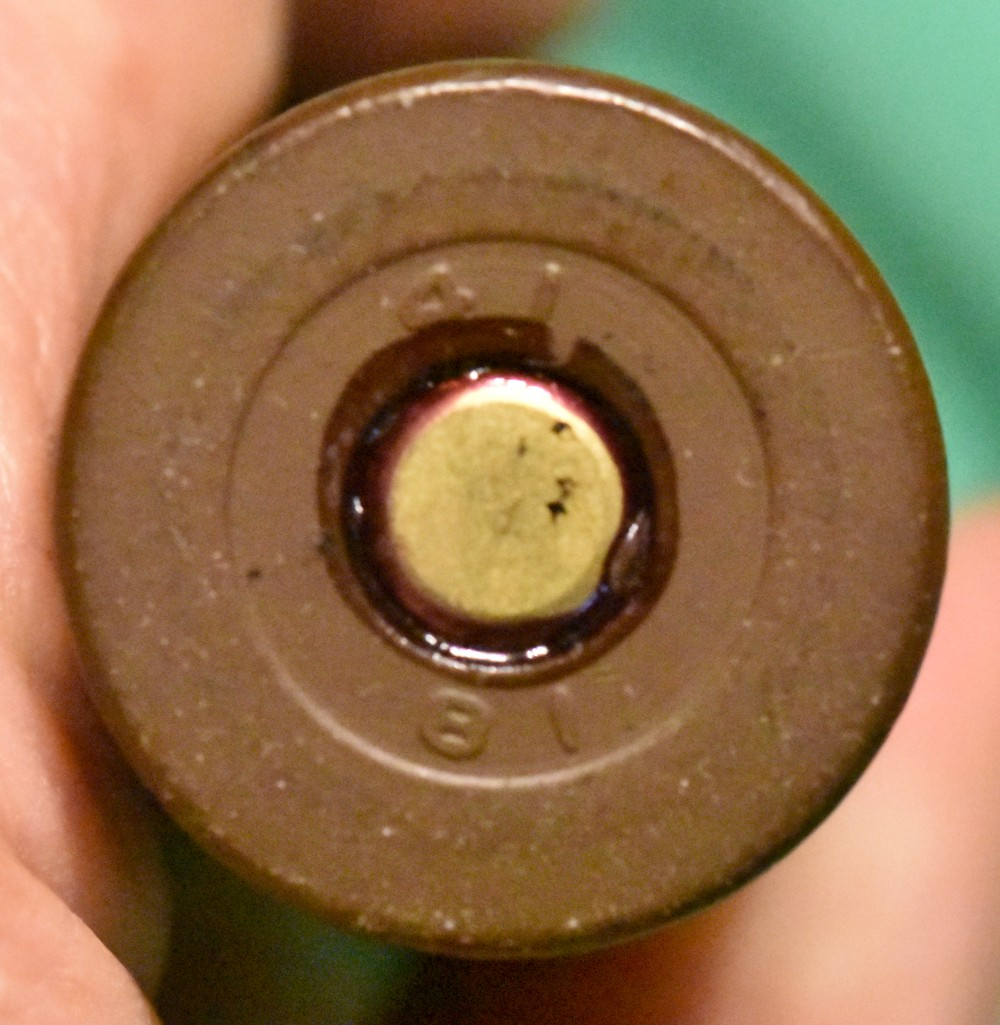
14.5 × 114 Soviet ammunition base, made in 1981

- BS: Armour-piercing incendiary original anti-tank round. The projectile weighs 64.4 g (994 gr) and is 51 mm (2.0 in) long with a 38.7 g (597 gr) core of tungsten carbide with 1.8 g (28 gr) of incendiary material in the tip. The overall round masses approximately 200 g (3,100 gr) and is 155 mm (6.1 in) long. The projectile has a muzzle velocity of approximately 1,006 m/s (3,300 ft/s; Mach 3.0), giving it a translational kinetic energy of 32,588 J (24,036 ft⋅lb) and a rotational kinetic energy of 138–172 J (102–127 ft⋅lb), assuming its nominal diameter of 14.88 mm (0.586 in) rather than the average diameter left behind by the rifling of 14.725 mm (0.5797 in) - the range is between treating the cartridge as an ellipsoid versus a cylinder for the purposes of moment of inertia. Using the rifled diameter yields 135–168 J (100–124 ft⋅lb). It can penetrate 30–32 mm (1.2–1.3 in) of RHA steel at an incidence of 0 degrees at a range of 500 m (1,600 ft), or 40 mm (1.6 in) at a range of 100 m (330 ft).
- B-32: Armour-piercing incendiary full-metal-jacket round with a hardened steel core. Projectile weight is 64 g (2.3 oz) and muzzle velocity is 1,006 m/s (3,300 ft/s). Armour penetration at 500 m (1,600 ft) is 32 mm (1.3 in) of RHA at 90 degrees.
- BZT: Armour-piercing incendiary tracer full-metal-jacket round with a steel core. Projectile weight is 59.56 g (2.101 oz) and muzzle velocity is 1,006 m/s (3,300 ft/s). Tracer burns to at least 2,000 m (6,600 ft).
- MDZ: High-explosive incendiary bullet of instant action. Projectile weight is 59.6 g (2.10 oz).
- ZP: Incendiary tracer round.

Cartridges use lacquered steel cases and percussion primers. Some countries also use brass cartridge cases. The propellant consists of 28.8 g (1.02 oz) smokeless powder with seven tubes, designated as "5/7NA powder". Two different versions of bullet series are known, the earlier has a conventional bullet jacket with a boat-tail. These have a long engraving portion that causes considerable barrel wear. The newer bullet types have a smaller engraving portion with a rounder boat-tail and were used from about 1957 onward.

The cartridge has been manufactured in Bulgaria, China, Egypt, Hungary, Iraq, North Korea, Poland, Romania, Russia, and the former Czechoslovakia. There are new Chinese armour-piercing types:

- DGJ02: APDS-T cartridges use 45 g (690 gr) tungsten penetrators, wrapped in discarding sabots (similar to the US military SLAP cartridges) with dual colour tracers to aid ranging. The sabot splits and leaves the penetrator between 150 m (490 ft) and 200 m (660 ft) from the muzzle. It has a muzzle velocity of 1,250 m/s (4,100 ft/s; Mach 3.7) and is quoted as being able to penetrate 20 mm (0.79 in) of armour plate set at an angle of 60° at 1,000 m (3,300 ft).
- DGE02: APHEI cartridges are notably heavy, 175–188 g (2,700–2,900 gr). At 1,000 m (3,300 ft) it is quoted as having a 90 percent chance of being able to penetrate 15 mm (0.59 in) of armour plate set at 30°. At 300 m (980 ft) after penetrating a 2 mm (0.079 in) soft steel plate (representing an aircraft skin) it can further penetrate a 1.2 mm (0.047 in) thick steel plate, producing about 20 fragments. Upon explosion, between 75 and 95 incendiary pieces are formed, which have an 80% chance of igniting aviation fuel.

== Chambered weapons ==
Anti-materiel rifles

- Anzio rifle
- Cadex CDX-X145
- Denel NTW-20
- Gepard M-3
- MCR Horizon's Lord
- Istiglal IST-14.5
- Mambi-1 AMR
- PDSHP
- PTRS-41 (anti-tank rifle)
- PTRD-41 (anti-tank rifle)
- Shaher
- Snipex T-Rex
- Snipex Alligator
- Truvelo 14.5×114mm
- Vidhwansak
- Şer rifle (home made anti-materiel rifle)

Machine guns

- Slostin machine gun (heavy variant)
- KPV heavy machine gun
  - Chinese Type 56 (KPV) and Type 58 (KPVT) heavy machine guns
- Type 02/QJG-02 heavy machine gun

Other

- ZPU anti-aircraft guns
- 2Kh35 inserted unified self-loading gun

In addition to being chambered in multiple calibers, the Ukrainian Horizon's Lord rifle uses its own proprietary "12.7 × 114 HL" cartridge made by necking down a 14.5 × 114 mm cartridge case to accept a .50 BMG bullet. In essence, the 14.5 × 114mm cartridge is the parent case for the 12.7 × 114 HL.

== See also ==
- 12.7 × 108 mm
- .50 BMG
- .60 caliber
- 20 mm caliber
- 23 mm caliber
- 25 mm caliber
- 30 mm caliber
