= XADO =

Multinational chemical group

Xado Хадо
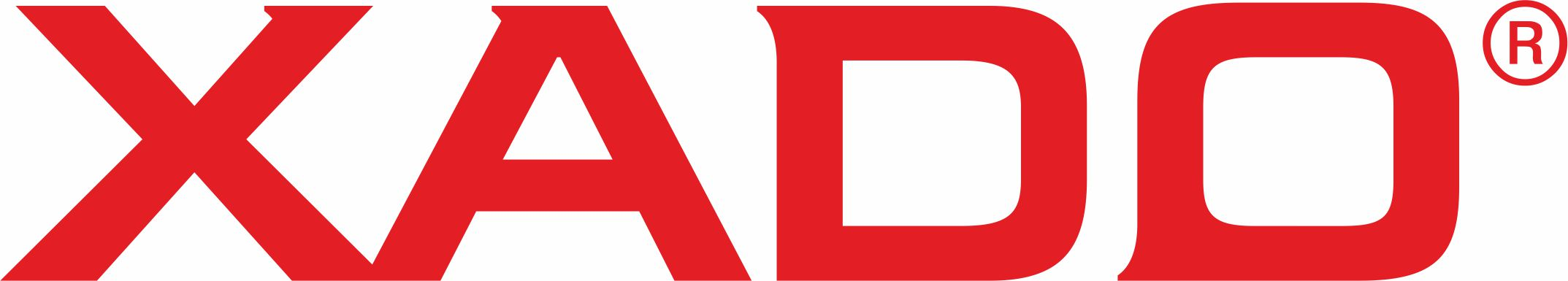
- Company type: Privately held company
- Founded: 1991
- Headquarters: Kharkiv, Ukraine
- Area served: Worldwide with distributors in more than 100 countries
- Products: Additive; Oil; Grease; Car care
- Number of employees: +2,500 (2023)
- Website: xado.com

Xado (Ukrainian: Хадо, romanized: Khado) is a multinational chemical group with headquarters in Germany, the Netherlands, and Ukraine, manufacturing high-tech nano technology products and lubricants such as revitalizants, lubricants, oils, greases, aftermarket oil additives, fuel additives.

== History ==
The company was founded in 1991 in Kharkiv, Ukraine. The name Xado was shortened from the Russian Kharkovskiy Dom ("Kharkiv house"). In 1998, the directors of the company patented the development of a revitalizant product, a metal treatment which has the ability to repair, restore and protect the mechanism against wear. The first consumer-packaged product was introduced in December 1999. In 2004 in the Netherlands, together with European manufacturer of oils Eurol, Xado established Xado Lube B.V., specializing in manufacturing oil with atomic revitalizant XADO Atomic Oil. In addition to the Netherlands, Xado has headquarters in Germany; Xado products are produced under Xado Germany and Xado Lube B.V. Netherlands licenses. Xado repairing products possess TÜV performance confirmation certificate, ISO 17025, American Petroleum Institute (API) approvals.

== Activity ==
The company manufactures over 1,600 products, primarily for car maintenance, which can be purchased in more than 100 countries all over the world (as of March 2023). The best-known Xado products include revitalizants, atomic oils, and VeryLube car care products. The specialists assess Xado as the major player in the Ukrainian market of imported and domestic antifriction materials as well, actively occupying almost all major regions of the post-Soviet countries. The company's share of the market is 24%, whereas in the segment of nanoceramics it is up to 90%.

== Sports ==
- Xádo owns a motorsports team XADO Motorsport, the champion of Ukrainian Rally and Circular Racing Cups.
- Xádo is a sponsor of Pro100!XADO, the first Ukrainian gamer team to win the International computer games tournament.
- In September 2011 Xádo started to cooperate with one of the most titled football clubs of Ukraine, Shakhtar Donetsk.
