= A91 =

A91 or A-91 may refer to:

- A91 road, a trunk road in Scotland
- Dutch Defence, in the Encyclopaedia of Chess Openings
- A-91, a Soviet bull-pup assault rifle, derived from the 9A-91 carbine
