= Desert Tech HTI =

Hard Target Interdiction
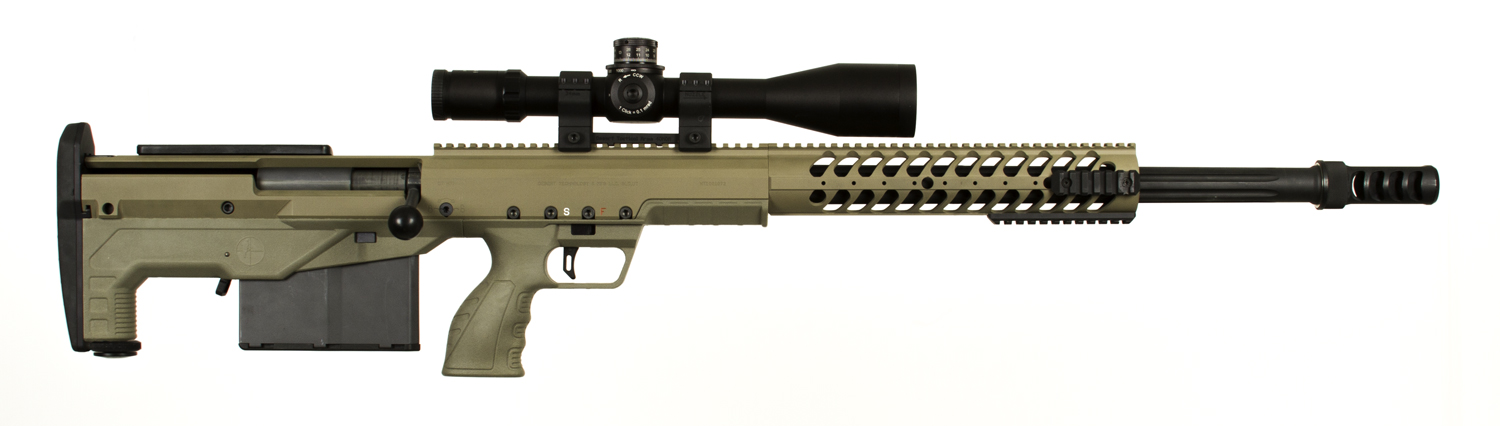
- A Desert Tech HTI
- Type: Bullpup bolt-action sniper/anti-materiel rifle
- Place of origin: United States

Service history
- Wars: Russo-Ukrainian War

Production history
- Designer: Desert Tech
- Manufacturer: Desert Tech
- Unit cost: $7699 (November 2023 .50 BMG)
- Produced: 2012–present

Specifications
- Mass: 8.93 kg (19.7 lb) (.375 CheyTac); 9.18 kg (20.2 lb) (.408 CheyTac, .416 Barrett); 9.09 kg (20.0 lb) (.50 BMG)
- Length: 1,127 mm (44.4 in) (.375 CheyTac, .408 CheyTac); 1,152.4 mm (45.37 in) (.416 Barrett, .50 BMG)
- Barrel length: 737 mm (29.0 in)
- Cartridge: .375 Cheyenne Tactical.408 Cheyenne Tactical.416 Barrett.50 BMG
- Action: Bolt action
- Effective firing range: 2200m (.50 BMG)
- Feed system: 5-round detachable box magazine
- Sights: Picatinny rail for mounting iron or optical sights

The Desert Tech Hard Target Interdiction (HTI) is a bullpup bolt-action sniper and anti-materiel rifle designed and manufactured in West Valley City, Utah, United States by Desert Tech (formerly Desert Tactical Arms).

== Design ==
The Desert Tech HTI made its first public debut at Shot Show 2012 as a modular multi caliber bullpup Sniper Rifle.

The design of the HTI is largely based on the SRS-A1, scaled up to handle larger cartridges. It is made out of high-impact polymers, aircraft grade aluminum (7075-T6), ultra high-strength steels, and durable coatings. These materials make the firearm 12 pounds lighter, 12 inches shorter, and far more accurate than the comparable US M82A1 and M107 50 BMG rifles, in the same caliber, currently in service with various militaries around the world.

Barrels on the HTI can be changed within 60 seconds, allowing the chambering to be easily changed or worn out barrels to be quickly replaced. The chamberings currently available from Desert Tech are .375 Cheyenne Tactical (CheyTac), .408 CheyTac, .416 Barrett, and .50 BMG.

The bullpup design means the action is behind the trigger. As with all bullpups, this allows for a shorter overall length, without having to reduce barrel length.

Results of the shelf ammunition accuracy tests of the Desert Tech HTI firearm show between 0.549 MOA and 1.751 MOA, depending on ammunition used.

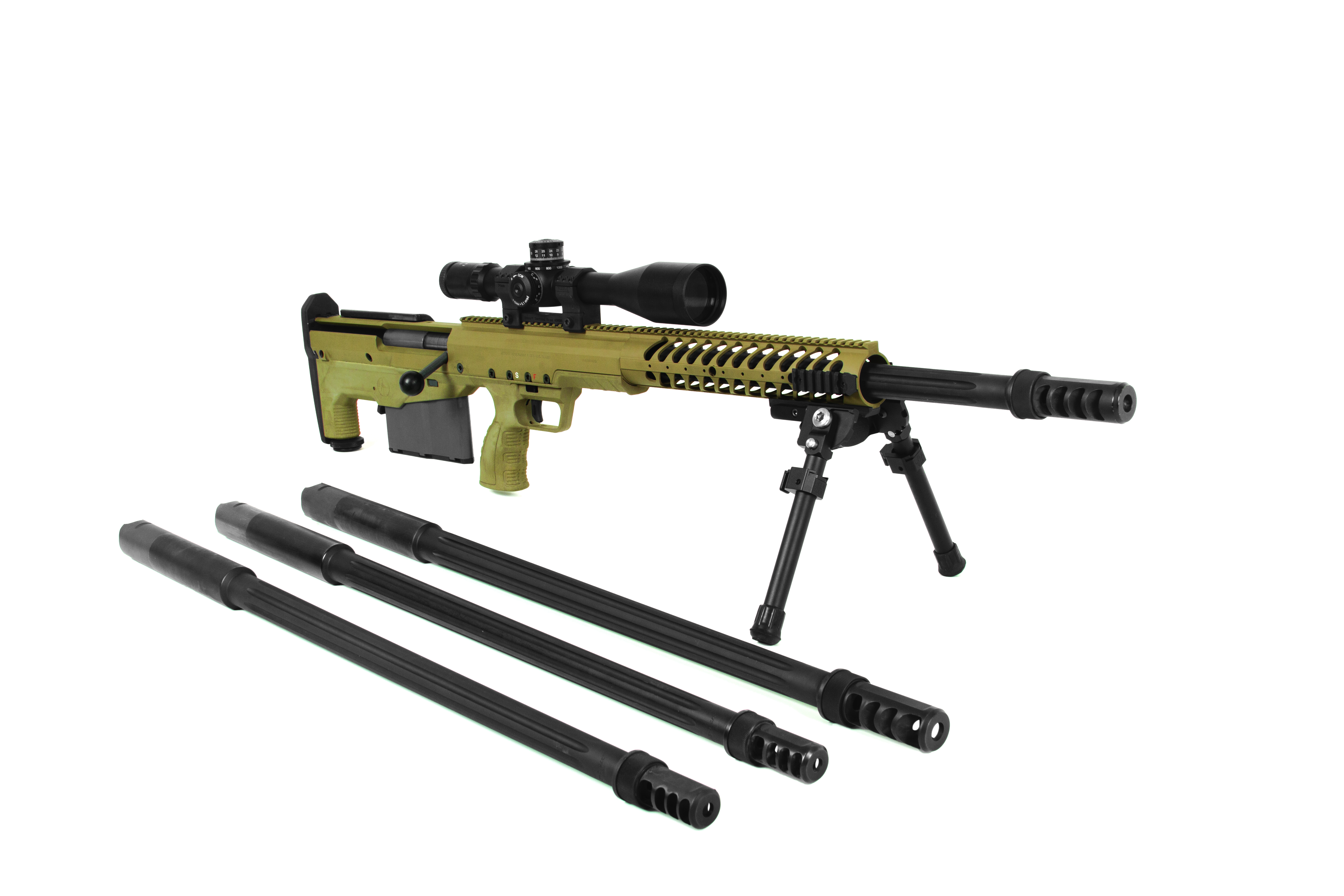

== Users ==
- Armenia: Used by Special forces of Armenia.
- Czech Republic: In March 2017, the Czech Ministry of Defence signed a contract worth CZK 75 million (US$3 million) for 30 Hard Target Interdiction rifles for use by Czech special forces in international operations. The contract also included the delivery of 30 sets of conversion kits for .375 CheyTac and .50 BMG cartridges (including barrel, bolt, and magazines), along with scopes, 120 replacement barrels (737 mm/29.0 in long), 21,000 cartridges, and additional accessories such as bipods, mounts, and cases.
- Lithuania: Sniper rifle in the Lithuanian Armed Forces; selected in 2015.
- Saudi Arabia: Sniper rifle in the Saudi Royal Guard Regiment; selected in 2013.
- Ukraine: Used by the State Border Guard of Ukraine.

== See also ==
- List of bullpup firearms
- List of sniper rifles
