= Desert Tech MDR =

Family of rifles

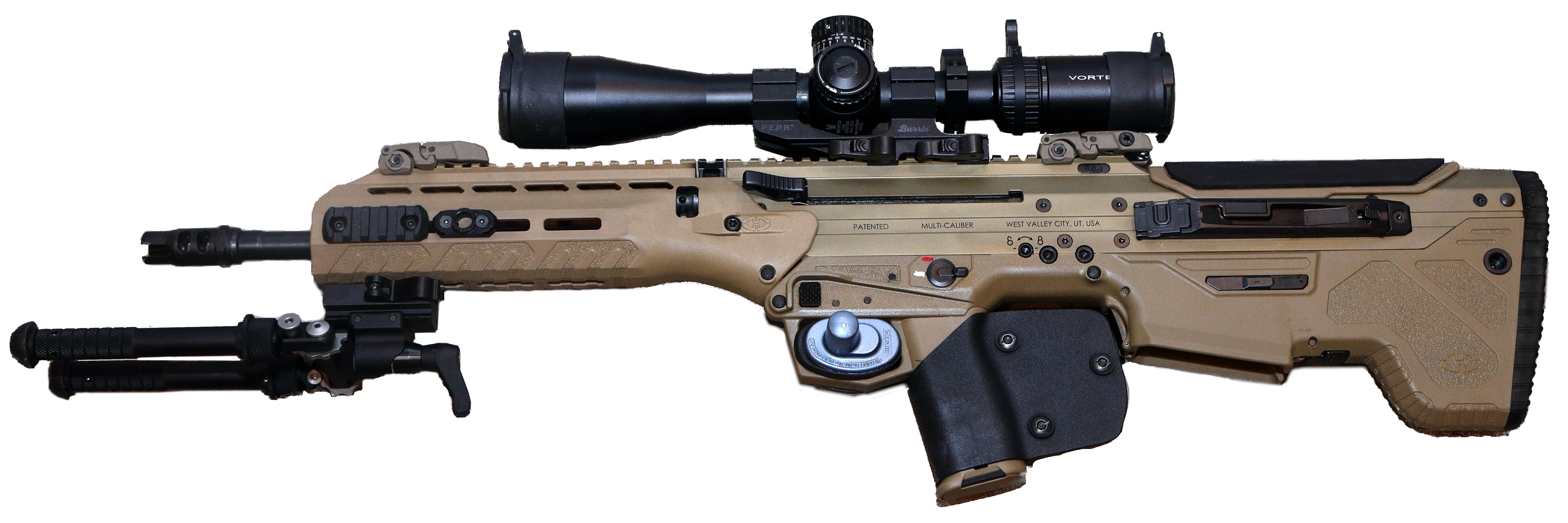
- A Compliant Desert Tech MDRx with 3-15 Scope, Bipod, front QD, Ratchet Compensator, Saddle Blanket, Front and Rear backup sights, over molded hand guard, and Trigger Lock
- Type: Bullpup semi-automatic rifle
- Place of origin: United States

Production history
- Designer: Desert Tech
- Manufacturer: Desert Tech
- Unit cost: $2099 (August 2020 for 5.56)
- Produced: 2017–2019 (MDR); 2020–2024(MDRX)
- Variants: MDR; MDRX; MDRX-SE; MDRX Compliant; MDRX-SE Compliant; MDRX Micron (conversion kit)

Specifications
- Mass: 3.72 kg (8.2 lb) SE 16"; 3.94 kg (8.7 lb) FE 16"; 4.03 kg (8.9 lb) FE 20"; 3.33 kg (7.3 lb) Micron
- Length: 698 mm (27.5 in) FE 16"; 800 mm (31 in) FE 20"; 595.12 mm (23.430 in) Micron
- Barrel length: 410 mm (16 in); 510 mm (20 in); 292.1 mm (11.50 in)
- Width: 57.4 mm (2.26 in) SE; 59.2 mm (2.33 in) FE
- Height: 200.4 mm (7.89 in)
- Cartridge: .223 Remington; 5.56×45mm NATO; .223 Wylde; .300 BLK; .308 Win; 7.62×51mm NATO; 6.5mm Creedmoor; .350 Legend; .450 Bushmaster
- Action: Short-stroke gas-operated piston, rotating bolt
- Rate of fire: 625 rounds/min (MDR-A)
- Muzzle velocity: 3150 ft/s (960 m/s) (With 5.56x45mm NATO M855A1 ammunition)
- Effective firing range: 900m
- Feed system: 10, 20, & 30-round box magazine
- Sights: Picatinny rail for mounting Picatinny mounted iron sights or various optical sights

The Desert Tech MDR (Micro Dynamic Rifle) is a family of bullpup semi-automatic rifles designed by Desert Tech (formerly Desert Tactical Arms) in 2014. A second generation of the MDR was later developed, designated as the MDRx (Micro Dynamic Rifle eXtreme). A third generation was announced, serving as a successor to the MDRx series, designated as the Desert Tech WLVRN.

The MDR's first public debut was in 2014 at Shot Show and was discontinued on January 18, 2024, right before Shot Show 2024.

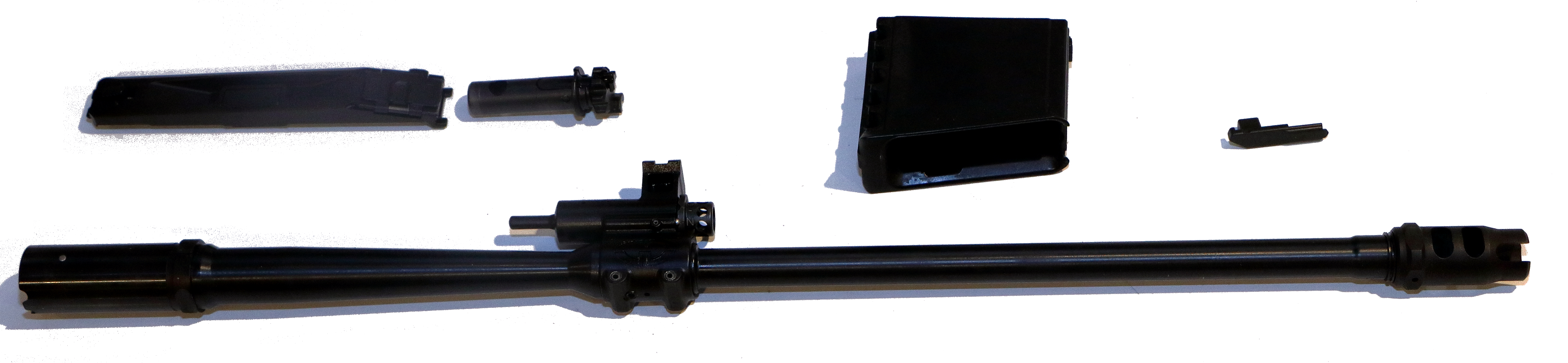
Desert Tech MDRX 5.56/.223 Conversion Kit includes barrel, mag catch, mag insert, bolt head, and ejector chute

== Design details ==
The Desert Tech MDR is a gas operated, conventional rotary bolt bullpup rifle. The gas system features a gas piston located above the barrel and a 6 position manual gas regulator.

The MDR is designed to be ambidextrous. The MDR contains an ambidextrous forward and side eject port and viewing window that allows for tool free forward ejector side change. A non reciprocating ambidextrous charging handle is installed on both sides of the gun, and two or three-position safety / selector levers and magazine release are provided on both sides of the pistol grip. The rifle is compatible with Desert Tech caliber conversion kits that allow the rifle to change caliber. This provides a unique feature in which the rifle chassis can accept both intermediate cartridges and full-powered rifle cartridges on the same serial number platform (such as 5.56×45mm NATO and 7.62×51mm NATO magazines). The Colt CM901 is one of the early designs able to accept different cartridge categories on the same platform with a caliber conversion kit.

The outer shell of the gun is made from impact-resistant polymer with an aluminium receiver.

Many of the MDR’s components are produced using modern Metal injection molding (MIM) metalworking processes that are becoming more common in the firearm industry. MDR MIM parts including the Barrel Block (Trunnion), Gas Block, Bolt Catch, 7.62 mag conversion bar, ejector retainer, and extractor link, are produced by Indo-MIM Pvt. Ltd., India. Indo-MIM Pvt, Ltd received the 2017 distinction in hand/tools award by PIM international for their innovation in MIM development and part cost reduction.

The .308/7.62 MDR was 10,000 round endurance tested with .308 win 150 grain FMJ American Eagle, 7.62x51 149 grain American Eagle, 7.62 m80 ball US Surplus and averaged 1 failure in 2000 rounds.

=== MDR .308/7.62 upgrade program ===
The 2017 MDR in .308/7.62 win received public feedback that resulted in an upgrade program by Desert Tech on the gas and extractor system in 2019 to improve the rifle's ammunition tolerance without having to adjust the gas setting as frequently. This update is considered the Generation 2 MDR Gas System.

Desert Tech publicly addressed the MDR criticism on January 10, 2019. Desert Tech directly attributed the most vocal criticism of the platform to the InRangeTV company in collaboration with the Forgotten Weapons Company that demonstrated numerous failures in the system that were identified to be from varying ammunition loads used in the gas system on December 13, 2018. In addition to addressing the criticism, Desert Tech provided a technical root cause analysis presentation on the platform failures and resulting improvements with the generation 2 gas system. As a supplemental incentive, Desert Tech announced their MDR generation 2 gas system upgrade was to be covered under their warranty program for all owners.

=== MDRX redesign ===
The Micro Dynamic Rifle eXtreme, MDRX, variant was produced and marketed as a separate firearm in 2020. Improvements to the firearm include the following: Improved impact-resistant polymer, improved trigger, improved gas block, and a new "Ratchet" compensator.

The firearm was offered in .300 BLK, 6.5 Creedmoor (The first production semi-auto bullpup chambered in this cartridge), along with its original .223/5.56 and .308/7.62 calibers as well as 20" barrel and side ejection options. This update is considered the generation 3 MDR gas system.

Desert Tech halted production of the .300 BLK Rifle and conversion kits in late 2020 up until January 2023.

A California compliant variant was produced with a 20" barrel, shark fin grip, reduced magazine size, and California compliant Ratchet compensator to qualify for a featureless rifle restrictions.

The MDRX, with its various caliber kits, is rated from the manufacturer between 1-2 MOA. A large multi shooter community study in 2022, including aftermarket precision vendors such as ES Tactical, was able to quantify the performance of the stock OEM barrel between 1.9 and 5.6 MOA with 5 shot groups in .308 with various ammunition as well as identified a contributing failure mode of Trunnion fasteners loosening over time.

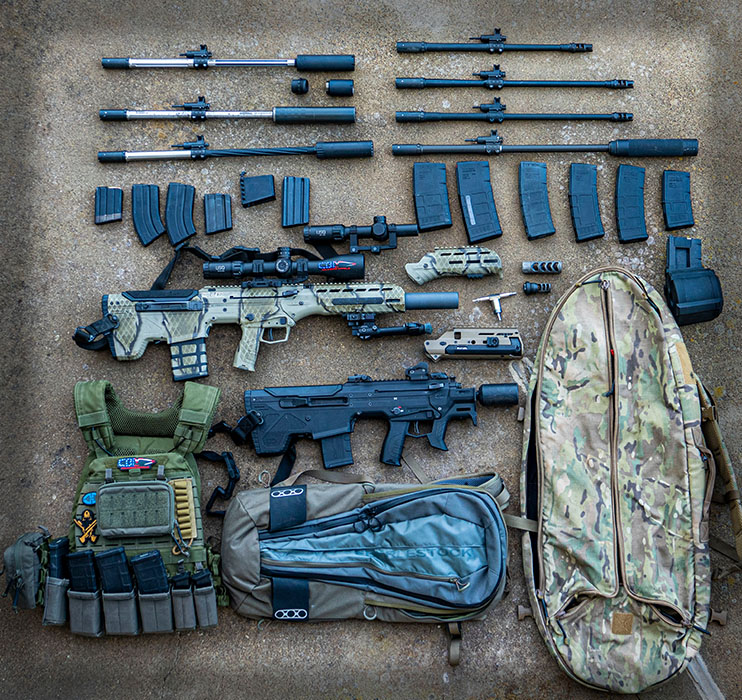
Desert Tech MDR (Top) and MDRX (Bottom) with various conversion kits, suppressors, various muzzle devices, magazines, necessary conversion tools, various handguards, and custom caliber ES Tactical barrels

On May 6th 2024, Desert Tech conducted their second extensive accuracy study on the MDR/MDRx platform in 308 and evaluated it against its competitor Rifles in the field and found that best unsuppressed performance of the rifle was 2.7 MOA. This performance is 1.2 MOA worse than the performance guaranteed with the paperwork that was shipped with the Rifle as well as the 1 to 2 MOA evaluation. This places the Rifle as the 2nd worst performing rifle that they tested. When suppressed the Rifle's performance was increased to 1.5 MOA, the other Rifles were not tested with suppressors. Desert Tech indicated that the rifle's poor mechanical performance was due the bullet being in the barrel while the barrel undergoes harmonic vibration due to the gas block location being too close to the chamber, light weight non match grade barrel, and patrol rifle trigger pull. In addition, Desert Tech presented their research data that clearly showed suppressors significantly improve the accuracy of Rifles by upwards of 1 MOA for the MDR.

For comparison on September 23rd 2022, Desert Tech asserted the worst accuracy in the MDRx was in .308 in the 16" length barrel. The resulting performance was 1.6 MOA suppressed. Desert tech did not present the unsuppressed Accuracy

== Design Changes, Upgrades, and Update History ==
=== MDR ===
On April 4, 2019, Desert Tech announced multiple MDR updates to improve rifle performance on the 308 Rifle. The manufacturer indicated that these updates would be incorporated in all post-announcement shipments. These updates including the 2019 6-hole gas valve and wider extractor. In addition a heavy hammer spring is available for special order to resolve light strike failures on hardened primers.

On August 13, 2019, Desert Tech announced a forward eject panel spring buffer kit for sale to resolve forward eject panel spring weakening over time on the MDR platform.

=== MDRX ===
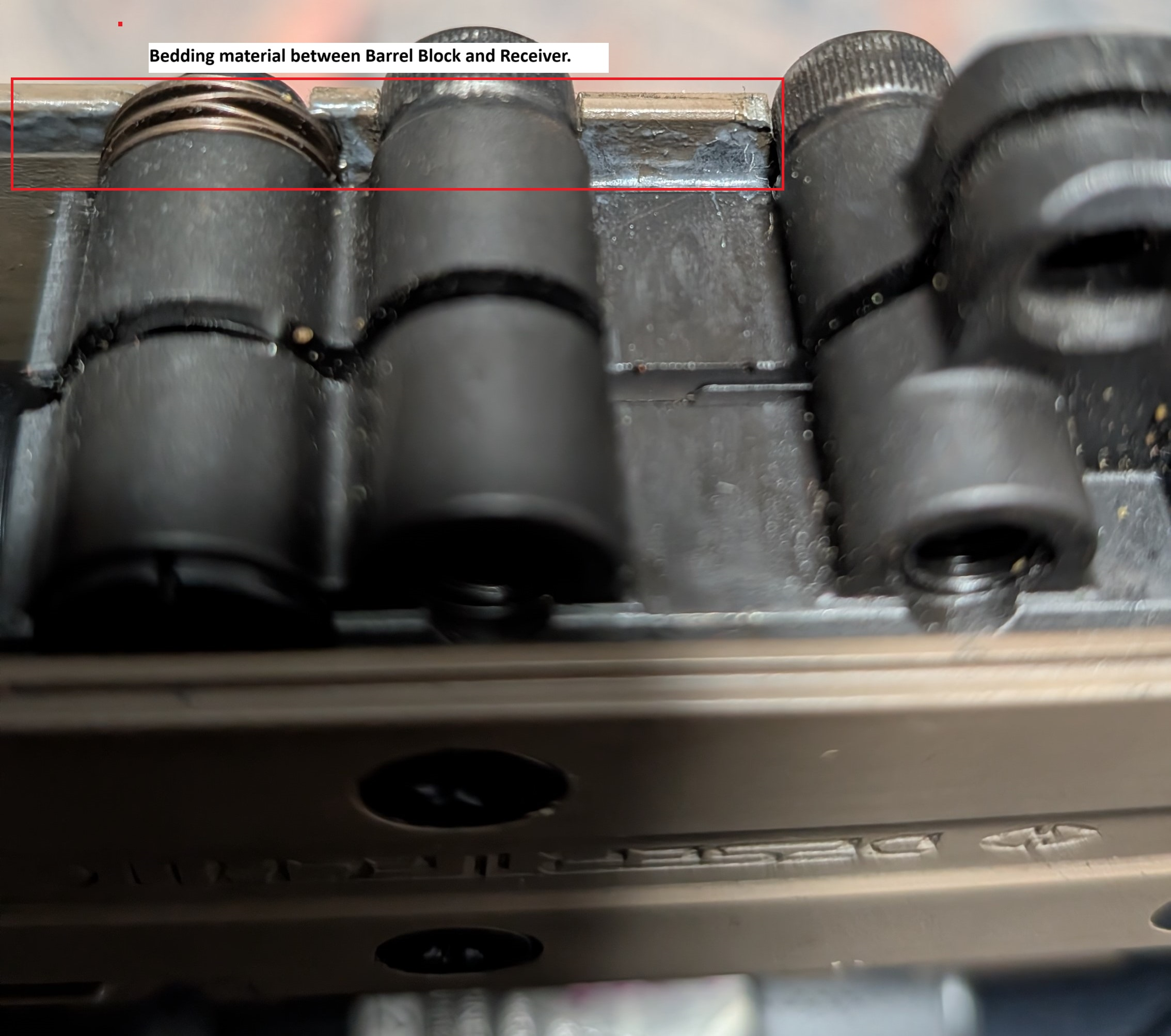
Barrel Block Bedding

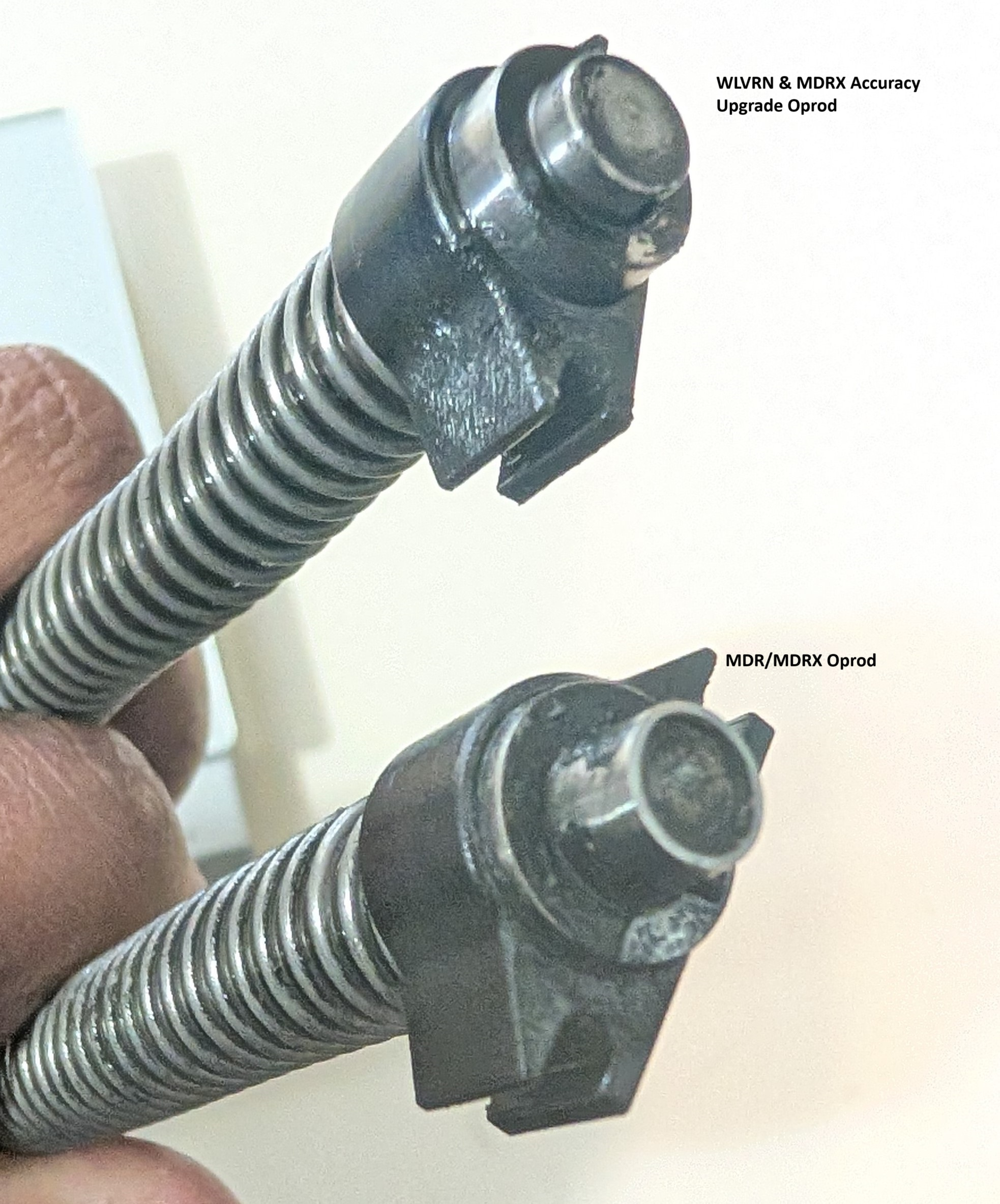
Visual difference between the Upgraded Oprod of the MDRx vs the Original MDRx Oprod

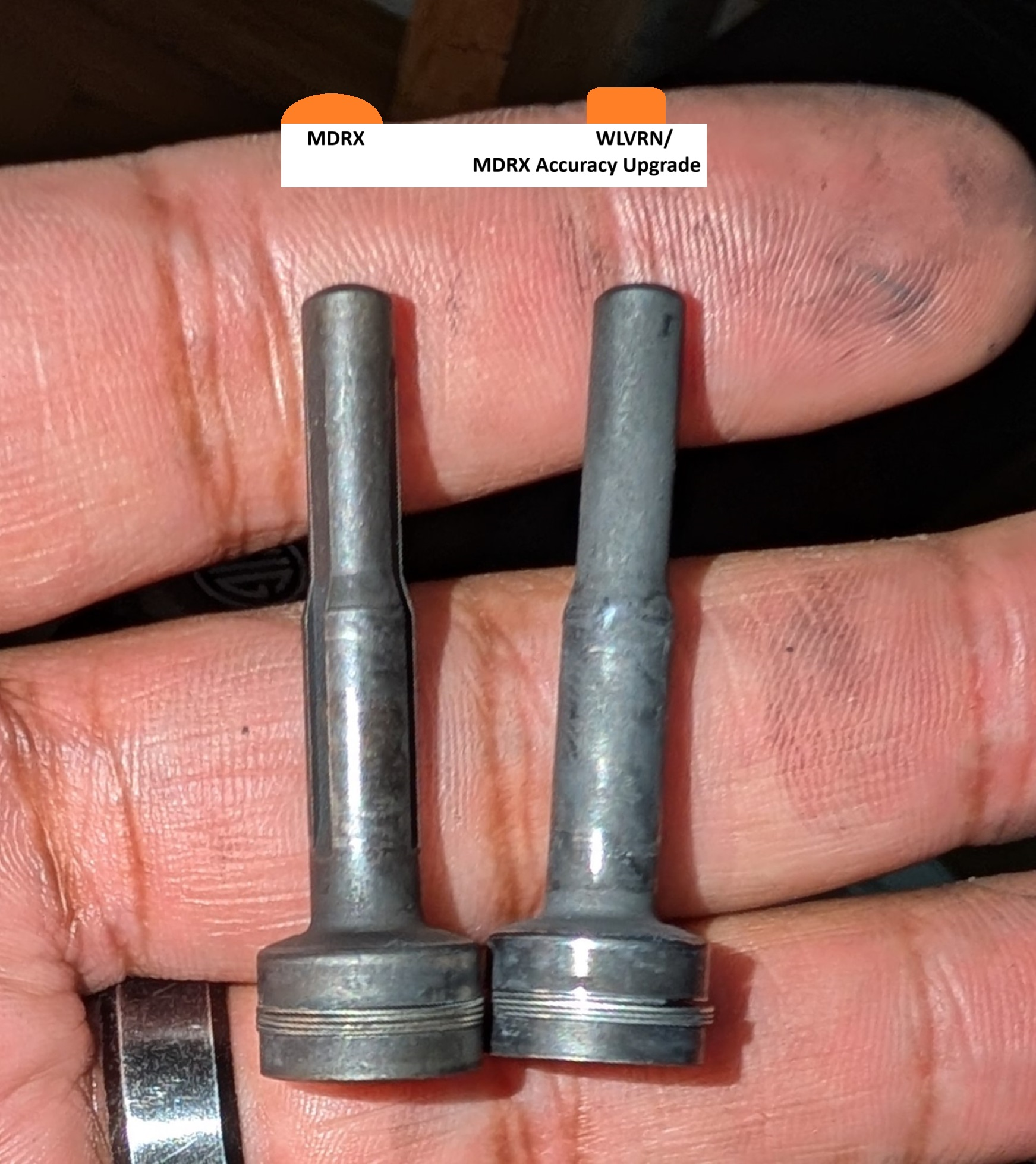
Visual difference between the Piston(s) of the Accuracy Upgrade MDRx vs the Original MDRx

On January 9, 2020, Desert Tech announced the MDRx was available for sale.

On January 28, 2021, the MDRX Micron conversion kit was announced that allowed the purchase of a 11.5" 5.56/.223 Wylde barrel, replacement hand guard, ejector plates, a new 'Raiden' flash hider, and bolt replacement for a side eject bullpup with a total length of 23.43". These kits allow standard MDRX and MDRs to be classified and regulated as a short-barreled rifle (SBR) requiring the user to apply with the appropriate regulatory bodies before install of the conversion kit in their rifle. These kits became available for sale on January 29, 2021.

On March 18, 2021, a collaboration between Desert Tech and BLK LBL Bipods was announced to develop, produce, and sell the Mantis handguard. The handguard is a 9-inch-long (230 mm), 16.7-ounce (470 g), aluminium handguard with an integrated bipod that replaces the factory polymer handguard and improved zero for handguard mounted parts. The aluminium handguard with integrated bipod is designed for both 16" and 20" barrel MDR/MDRxs and allows both an M-LOK under handguard attachment as well as an integrated bipod to be used at the same time without interference.

In early 2022, a 13-inch-long (330 mm), 20.7-ounce (590 g) Mantis handguard for the longer 20" barrel option was available for sale.

In March 2022, ES Tactical, a Desert Tech Dealer who specializes in precision upgrade parts, began to sell after market caliber conversion kits in .350 Legend and .450 Bushmaster, resulting in the first bullpup to be chambered in those cartridges.

In June 2022, Desert Tech and BLK LBL announced a 13-inch-long (330 mm) and 9-inch-long (230 mm) ALX hand guard solution similar to the Mantis without the bipod attachment.

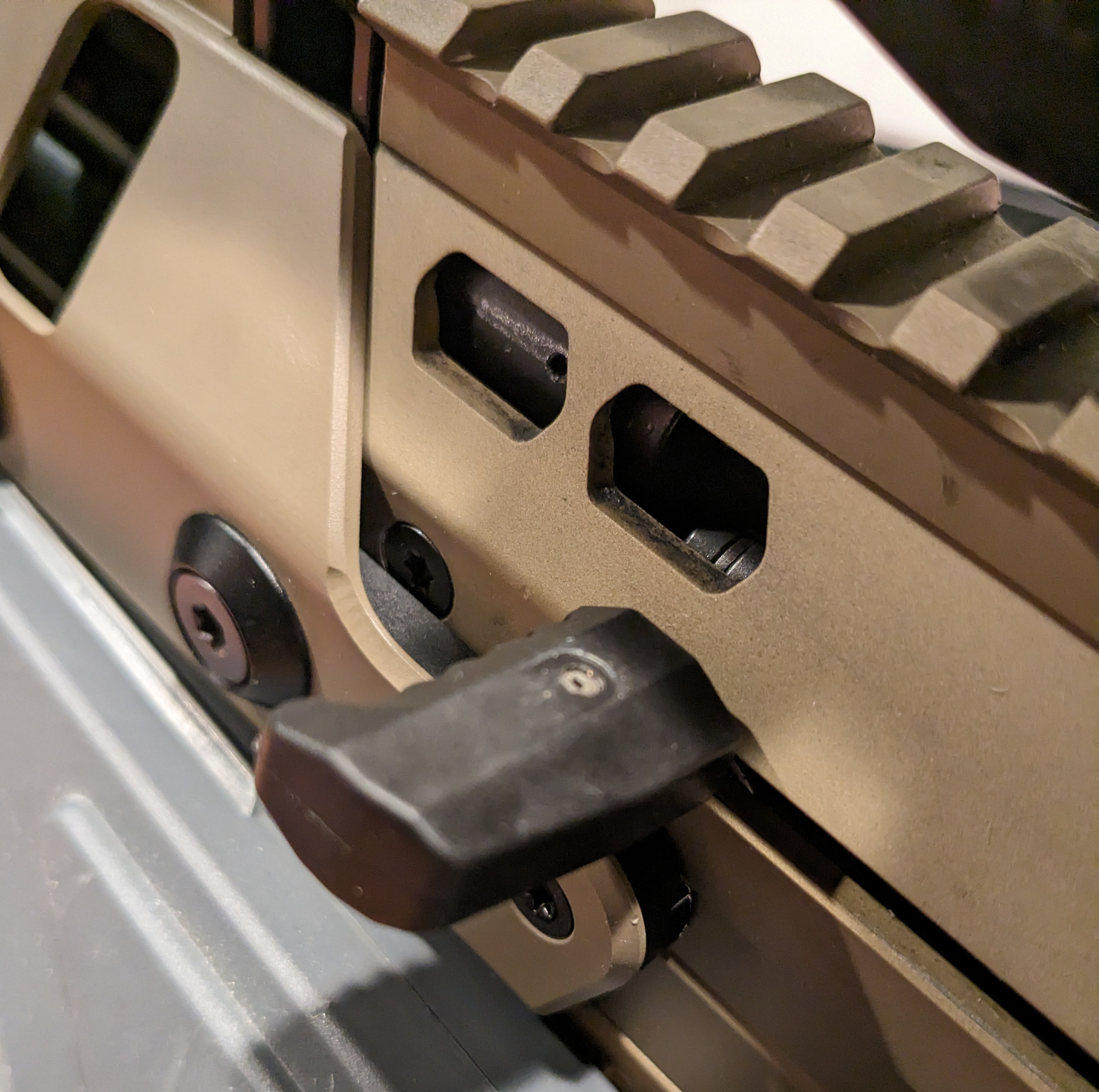
2023 MDRx charging handle

In January 2023, Desert tech announced multiple MDRx updates to resolve rifle weaknesses. Desert Tech indicated that these updates would be incorporated in all post announcement MDRx shipments. These updates include a new magazine transfer bar, magazine catch, updated non folding charging handle system (charging handle post, charging handle, and recoil buffer), a press-fit gas block, and barrel gas port inside bevel.

In August 2023, Desert Tech announced that the picatinny rail mounted gas blocks in the barrel assembly, designed to operate with a Desert Tech MDR red dot mount, would be discontinued. All future MDRxs and Barrel Assemblies would no longer include a Pic rail mounted gas block and be lighter. In addition, the company distributed an email notice to its customers, on August 18, indicating that a registered gunsmith could remove the pic rail from any existing barrel assembly without voiding the factory lifetime warranty.

On January 18, 2024, Desert Tech announced they would discontinue the MDRx to focus on the production of the WLVRN. Desert Tech indicated there were no parts compatibilities between the MDRx and the WLVRN. MDRx lifetime warranty support would continue.

On April 17, 2024, Desert tech announced an MDRx upgrade kit for the out of production Rifle to incorporate lessons learned from the WLVRN design to improve performance. These upgrades include "bedding" the Trunnion to reduce inaccuracy from the Trunnion Moving, and the WLVRN Oprod and gas piston system to reduce the accuracy impact from misalignment of these parts. Users may need to purchase additional WLVRN pistons on the Accuracy Upgrade MDRXs when changing calibers or retain the original piston and Op rod for use on unmodified MDR/MDRXs.

In addition, Desert Tech officially changed their Lifetime warranty policy that was announced in 2020, to only cover 10 years after the product leaves production. As such all MDRx owner's warranty coverage will end in 2034.

== Similar Projects ==
=== MDR-A ===
A prototype MDR with select fire capability was developed for Military and LEO use, but was unable to be produced and sold due to BATF and ATF regulation on Select fire weapons and as such was only a technology demonstrator.

=== MDR-C ===
A compact MDR prototype was developed called the MDR-C. However no known production models of this Rifle existed and it was later abandoned for the Micron conversion kit.

=== NGSAR ===
In 2018 a military version of the MDR, the NGSAR, was submitted, but was not one of the finalists in the United States Army Next Generation Squad Weapon Program trials to replace standard issue US army Infantry Weapons.

The NGSAR was developed in 2018, inspired by the MDR and chambered in a proprietary 6.8mm polymer-cased ammunition cartridge made by PCP was selected as one of the United States Army's Next Generation Squad Weapon Program (NGSW) weapons trial finalists to replace the United States Army's 5.56×45mm NATO caliber weapon systems. Desert Tech partnered with PCP tactical who provided a custom ammunition solution. The NGSAR was trialed in a carbine and automatic rifle configuration and were ultimately rejected.

The NGSAR rifle included improvements in the design such as a T-Worx battery powered integrated data rail, onboard round counter, longer receiver, bolt carrier, barrel extension, charging handle, forward eject system, barrel mounting system, proprietary 6.8mm PCP magazines, custom flow reflex suppressor, CNOD day/night optic.

=== Saudi DMR ===
In 2019, Desert tech began development on a Designated Marksman Rifle for a Saudi Arabia weapons contract in 308 Winchester. The rifle included adding JB weld between the MDRx trunnion and chassis to reduce trunnion movement under recoil of full power cartridges, a modified SRS barrel, a modified Gas Block, and a full length aluminum front handguard. Two rifles were produced, however Desert Tech was not awarded the contract.

=== WLVRN ===
The WLVRN is the major redesign of the MDR/MDRX platform, specifically the upper receiver. Most notable changes are the removal of all forward eject support, and a machined Aluminum upper receiver where all of the prior steel rail hardware was replaced with aluminum channels. In the areas of redesign there are little to no parts compatibility and as such is considered a distinct and different firearm, rather than an upgrade like the MDRX was to the MDR. However, a significant portion of the lower receiver is similar. When the WLVRN was announced in January of 2024, the MDRX was discontinued.

=== Sabertooth ===
The Sabertooth is a select fire variant of the WLVRN with a cyclic rate of fire of 675 rounds per minute, intended for military and law enforcement markets. The Sabertooth’s fire control group is not compatible with the WLVRN, which prevent civilians from converting their WLVRNs to fully automatic.

== See also ==
- FN F2000
- A-91
- Kel-Tec RFB
- Desert Tech WLVRN
- Bullpup
- List of bullpup firearms
