= Desert Tech WLVRN =

Family of rifles

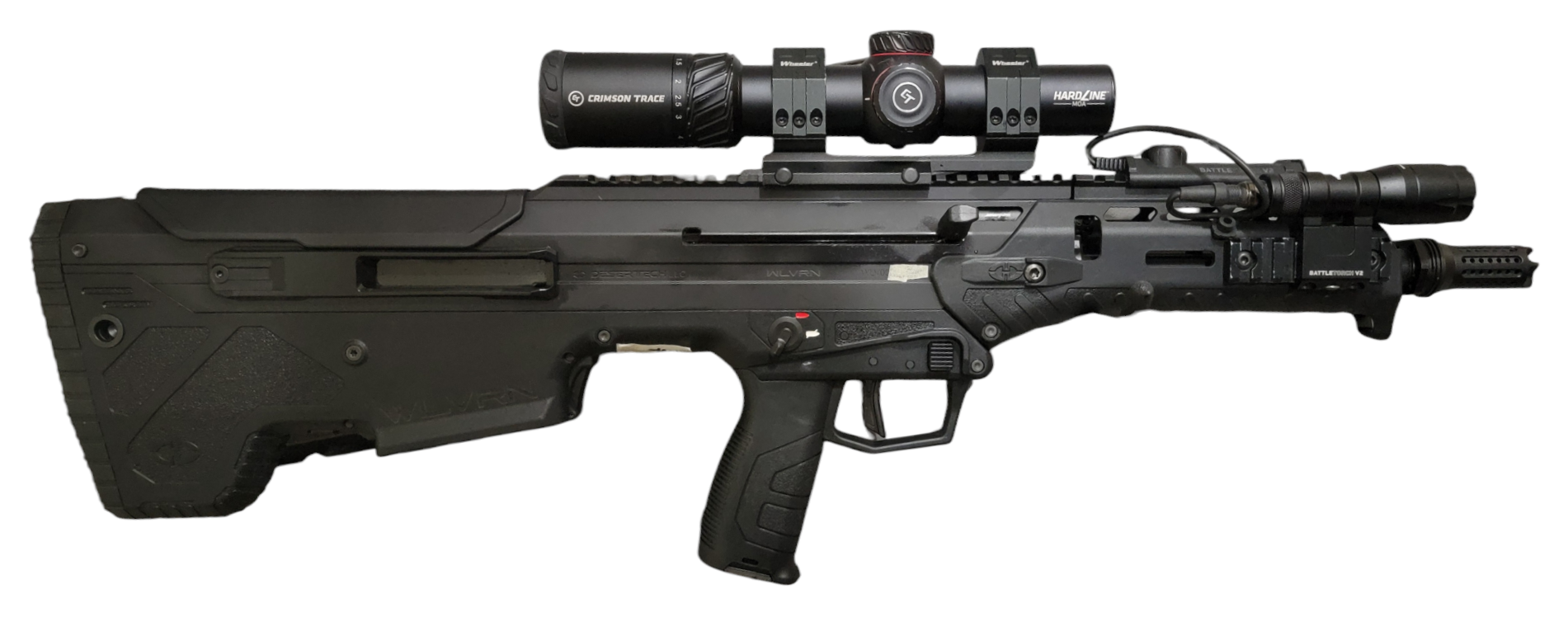
- Desert Tech WLVRN with a telescopic sight
- Type: Bullpup semi-automatic rifle Assault rifle Battle rifle
- Place of origin: United States

Production history
- Designer: Desert Tech
- Manufacturer: Desert Tech
- Unit cost: $2499 (January 2024 for 5.56)
- Produced: 2024–present
- Variants: See Variants

Specifications
- Mass: 3.37 kg (7.4 lb) .223 16"; 3.52 kg (7.8 lb) .223 20"; 3.32 kg (7.3 lb) .308 16"; 3.46 kg (7.6 lb) .308 20"; 3.46 kg (7.6 lb) 6.5 20"; 3.42 kg (7.5 lb) 300blk 16"
- Length: 660 mm (26 in) 16"; 762 mm (30.0 in) 20"
- Barrel length: 406 mm (16.0 in); 508 mm (20.0 in)
- Width: 42.9 mm (1.69 in)
- Height: 199.64 mm (7.860 in)
- Cartridge: .223 Remington; 5.56×45mm NATO; .223 Wylde; .300 BLK; .308 Win; 7.62×51mm NATO; 6.5mm Creedmoor
- Action: Short-stroke gas-operated piston, rotating bolt
- Rate of fire: 675 rounds/min
- Feed system: 10, 20, & 30-round box magazine
- Sights: Picatinny rail for mounting Picatinny mounted iron sights or various optical sights

The Desert Tech WLVRN, pronounced as "Wolverine", is a multi-caliber bullpup rifle and the successor of the MDR and MDRx.

The WLVRN was first showcased at the 2024 Shot Show convention in Las Vegas. The WLVRN aimed to improve various aspects of the MDRx platform that were determined to be limitations of the platform that were acknowledged to the public for the first time by Desert Tech several weeks before the announcement of the WLVRN at shot show.

== Design details ==
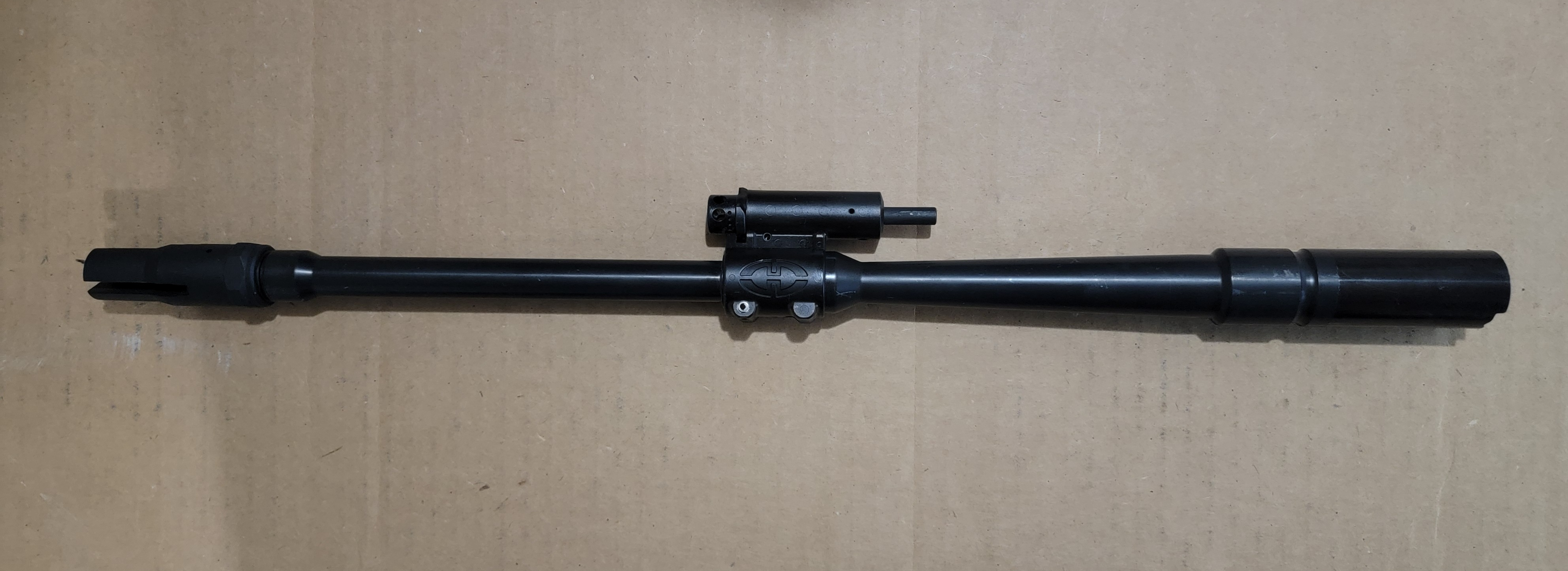
Desert Tech WLVRN 5.56 Barrel Assembly

The WLVRN was initially launched in 3 color options: Black, Flat Dark Earth (FDE), and Tungsten. Several calibers were supported through the various configurations possible including .223 Remington, .308 Winchester, .300 AAC Blackout, and 6.5mm Creedmoor, which barrel lengths ranging from Short-barreled rifle lengths (less than 16") to up to 20" in length, depending on the caliber. The WLVRN has a caliber quick change feature where it can easily swap between intermediate cartridges and full-powered rifle cartridges (such as 5.56×45mm NATO and 7.62×51mm NATO calibers respectively). The Colt CM901 is one of the early designs able to accept different cartridge categories on the same platform with a caliber conversion kit.

The WLVRN is a multi caliber gas operated, conventional rotary bolt bullpup semi-automatic rifle. The gas system features a gas piston located above the barrel and a 6 position manual gas regulator.

The WLVRN is similar to the Desert Tech MDRx that it replaced when it launched in January 2024. The WLVRN's specific improvements over the MDRx include a machined trunnion (for retaining the barrel assembly) into the receiver, new barrel/barrel extension design, replaceable feed-ramps, new bolt carrier design, updated charging handles (from the 2023 MDRX updates), a new magazine release system, new enhanced sealing gas block design with the picatinny rail removed, new chassis (to fill the hole where the picatinny rail was removed), and removal of the forward eject system resulting in less gas required to cycle the action.

One of the big changes to the barrel and chassis system design was a change to use a 3 lug barrel clamping system, an increase from 2, with an increase from 65 in-lbf of force to 80 in-lbf of force resulting in a significantly more rigid barrel to chassis clamping system.

On April 11 2024, a design defect in the receiver around the front takedown pin, was discovered by the Military Arms Channel resulting in a movement between the upper and lower receivers. The Military Arms Channel asserted this would not affect performance of the rifle. On the MDRX live Q/A, Desert tech acknowledged the problem and is implementing a design change to correct the defect.

== Variants ==
=== WLVRN Micron ===
On January 19 2024, a stand alone conversion kit the "MICRON" for the WLVRN was announced, featuring an extremely short handguard to minimize the rifle's overall length. These kits allow the WLVRN to be classified and regulated as a short-barreled rifle (SBR), which requires the user to register to the ATF before installing the conversion kit to their WLVRN. This kit is similar to the Micron kit sold for the Desert Tech MDRx.

As of January 2026, Desert tech began offering the MICRON in 300blk.

=== Sabertooth ===
The Desert Tech Sabertooth is a select-fire variant of the WLVRN, intended for military and law enforcement market. It features a fully automatic fire selector and several other design changes. However the Sabertooth's select-fire capabilities are not interchangeable with the WLVRN and as such it is considered a separate firearm to be compliant with ATF’s select fire regulation requiring lack of interchangeability between firearms.

== Gallery ==
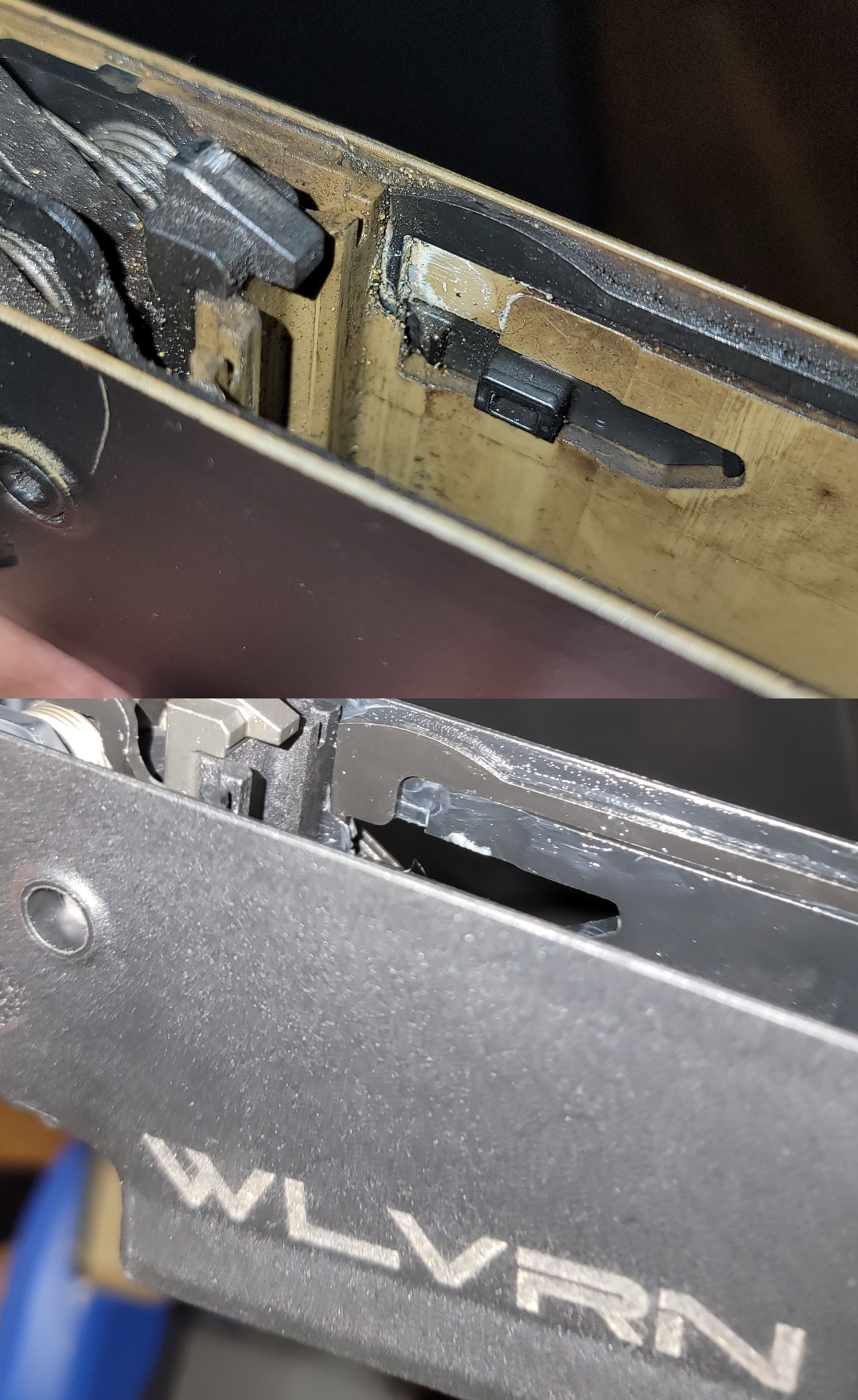
Desert Tech WLVRN (Bottom) and MDR (Top) Magazine Transfer Bar comparison

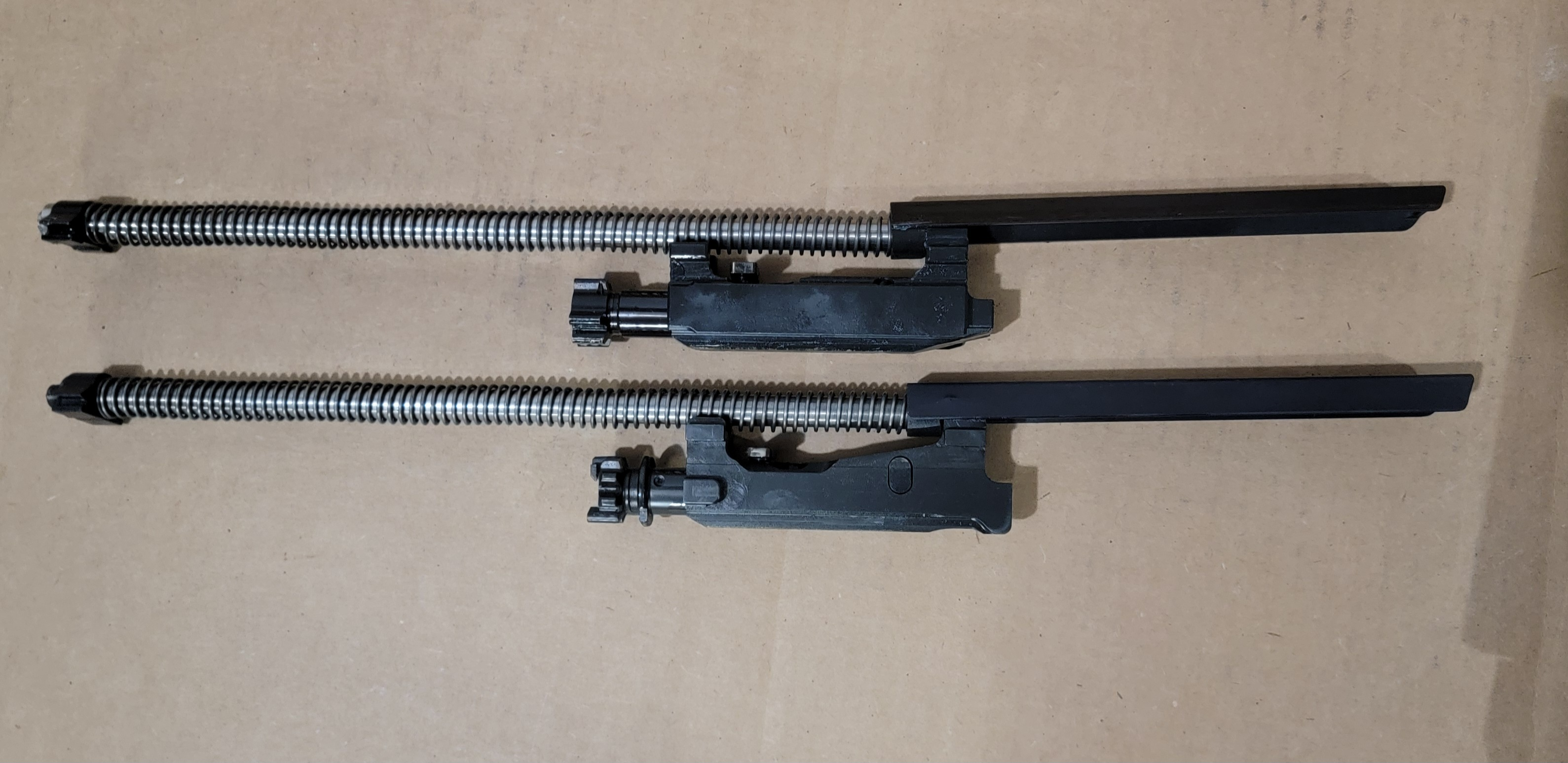
Desert Tech WLVRN (Top) and MDR (Bottom) Bolt Carrier Group comparison

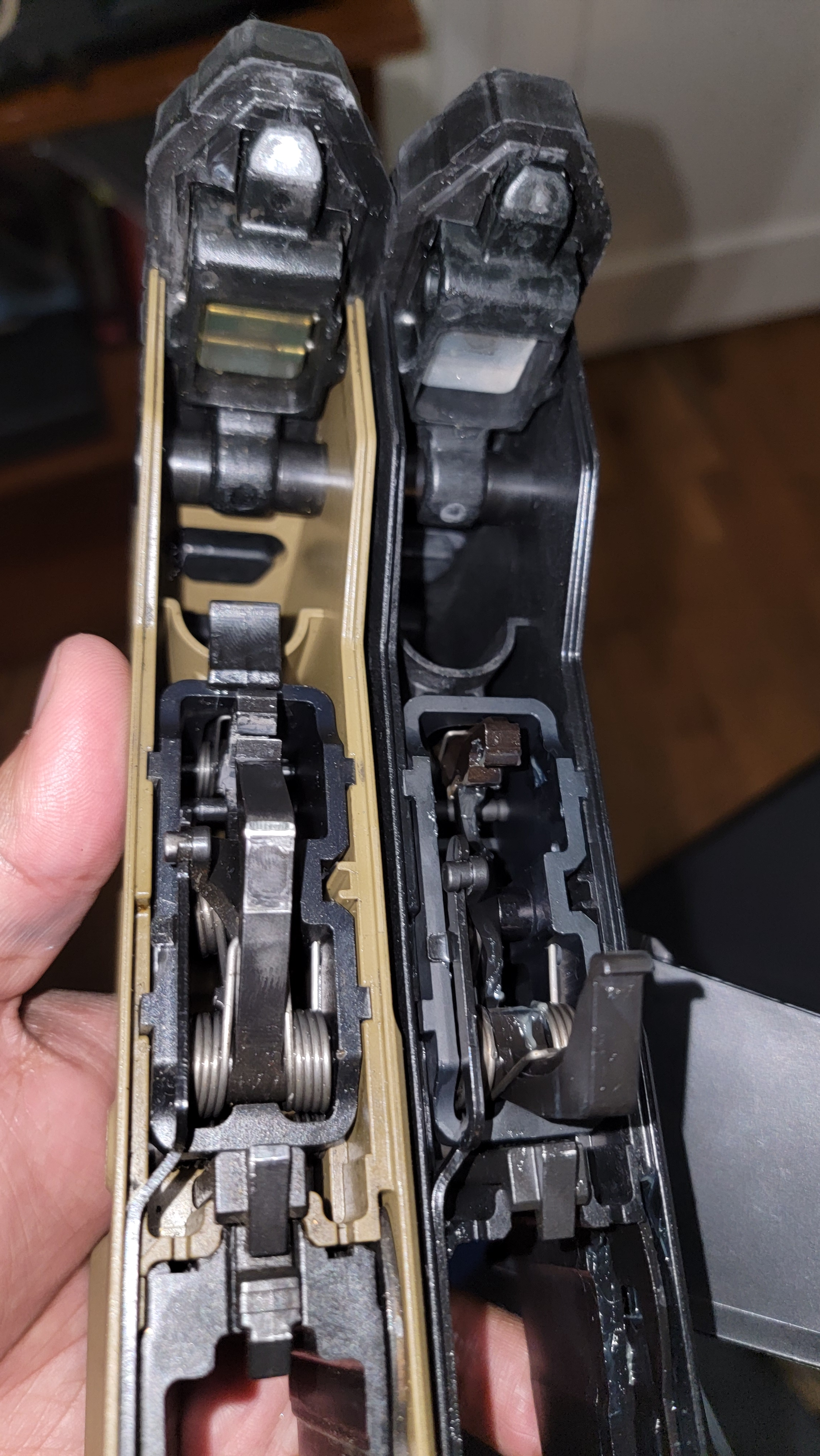
Desert Tech WLVRN (Right) and MDR (Left) lower receiver comparison

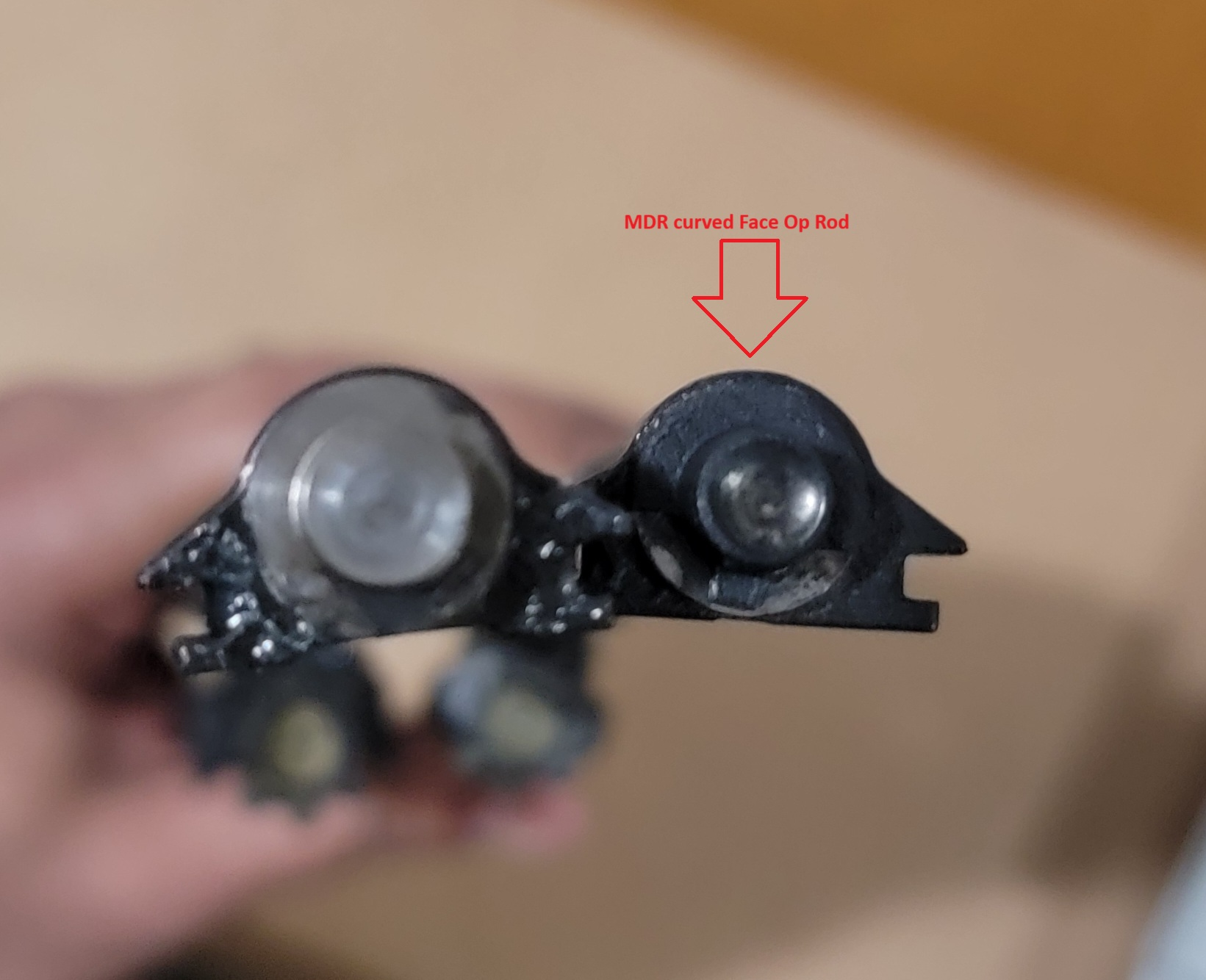
Desert Tech WLVRN (Left) and MDR (Right) Flat vs Curved oprod comparison

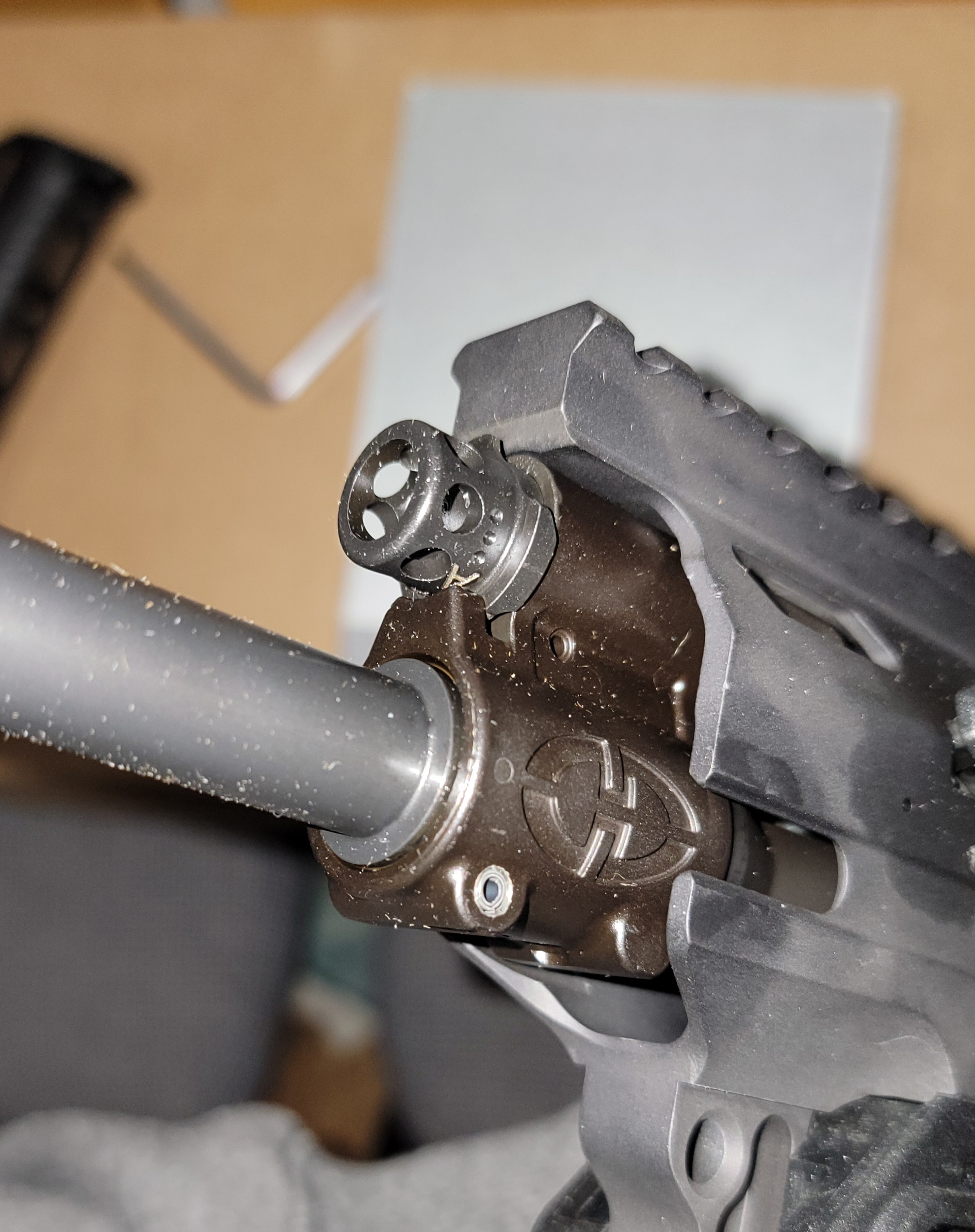
Desert Tech WLVRN with the Gas Block Pic rail removed (from the MDRX) and the new Chassis overhand

== See also ==
- FN F2000
- A-91
- Kel-Tec RFB
- List of bullpup firearms
