= DSR-Precision DSR-1 =

DSR-1
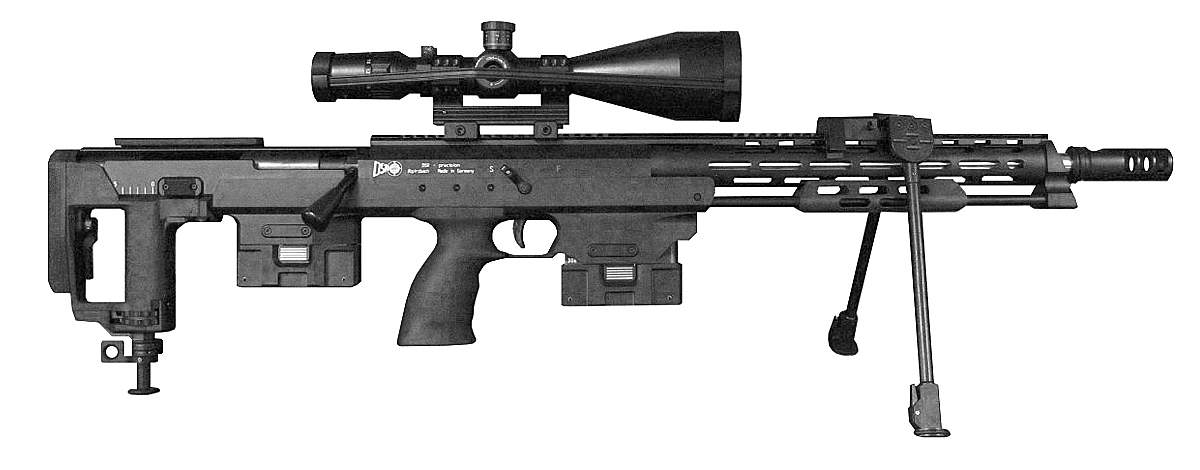
- The DSR-1 rifle in .308 Winchester
- Type: Sniper rifle
- Place of origin: Germany

Service history
- Used by: See Users

Production history
- Designer: Ingolf Reuter
- Manufacturer: DSR-precision GmbH
- Produced: Since 2000
- Variants: DSR-1 Subsonic (7.62×51mm NATO); DSR-50 Sniper Rifle (.50 BMG)

Specifications
- Mass: 5.9 kg (13.01 lb) (unloaded, without scope)
- Length: 990 mm (38.98 in)
- Barrel length: 650 mm (25.59 in)
- Cartridge: .308 Winchester.300 Winchester Magnum.338 Lapua Magnum
- Action: Bolt-action
- Effective firing range: 800 m (875 yd) (.308 Winchester); 1,100 m (1,203 yd) (.300 Win. Mag.); 1,500 m (1,640 yd) (.338 Lap. Mag.)
- Feed system: 5-round magazine
- Sights: Quick-detachable optical sights

The DSR-1 is a compact bolt-action sniper rifle designed, manufactured and marketed by the German company DSR-Precision GmbH and was (until 2004) also marketed by the German company AMP Technical Services as a specialized sniper rifle for police sharpshooters. It has been adopted by the German counter-terrorist unit GSG 9, as well as by other European special police units and agencies.

== Design details ==
The DSR-1 system is configured in a bullpup design, with a free-floating barrel. The rifle features a fully adjustable rear stock and cheek piece. The holder for a spare magazine is installed in the front of the trigger guard to decrease reloading time. The DSR-1 action features a benchrest match-grade, fluted barrel that is quickly interchangeable and is fixed into the receiver by three screws. The bolt features six lugs that lock directly into the barrel. The barrel is protected by a ventilated aluminium handguard and is fitted with a muzzle brake (which is very useful when firing full-power, magnum loads). The trigger is two-stage and adjustable. The DSR-1 features a manual, ambidextrous three-position safety, located above the trigger guard. For the standard version of the DSR-1 a tactical suppressor is available. The suppressor is designed to be used with high power ammunition of the DSR-1 chamberings. This suppressor effectively suppresses the muzzle blast. Naturally it cannot suppress the crack of a supersonic projectile but the direction where the bullet comes from is effectively concealed. The tactical suppressor is easily mounted in seconds on the muzzle brake using a quick release lever.

The German gun magazine Visier published an article in October 2003 edition, regarding their performed test shoots with a DSR-1 to get an indication of its accuracy potential with factory ammunition.

.308 Winchester cartridge type	100 m group (mm)	100 m group (MOA)	300 m group (mm)	300 m group (MOA)
RUAG Swiss P Target 168 gr HP-BT	13	0.45	48	0.55
Federal GM 168 gr Sierra MatchKing	14	0.48	55	0.63
Sellier & Bellot 168 gr HP-BT	15	0.51	52	0.59
IMI 168 gr Match	13	0.44	52	0.59
.300 Winchester Magnum cartridge type	100 m group (mm)	100 m group (MOA)	300 m group (mm)	300 m group (MOA)
RUAG Swiss P Target 200 gs HP-BT	13	0.45	38	0.43
Sellier & Bellot 168 gr HP-BT	14	0.48	45	0.51
Sako 168 grs HP-BT	14	0.48	30	0.34

The 5-shot groups were obtained by test shooters whilst shooting from the bipod and measured from centre to centre. The table shows that with target factory ammunition the DSR-1 performs in the 0.34 - 0.63 MOA region. Whether the DSR-1 can perform better under ideal environmental conditions with handloads tailored to the particular rifle and/or if the human test shooters were a limiting factor was not tested by Visier magazine. An article on the DSR-1 in the French gun magazine Armes & Tir November 2001 edition corroborates the German Visier results. The Armes & Tir test shooters used RUAG target cartridges and could shoot 200 x 300 mm (0.69 x 1.03 MOA) groups at 1,000 m distance with a .338 Lapua Magnum chambered DSR-1 rifle.

== Variants ==
The DSR-1 Subsonic is a variant optimized for 7.62×51mm NATO/.308 Winchester subsonic ammunition usage. The barrel length is reduced to 310 mm. The 8 inch twist rate of the barrel is especially adapted to stabilize the long heavy projectiles used in subsonic ammunition. The propellant charge of subsonic ammunition is reduced to keep the bullet velocity (300–320 m/s (980–1,050 ft/s) below the speed of sound (~ 340 m/s (1,100 ft/s)). At this subsonic speed the supersonic crack that arises when standard ammunition is fired is avoided. The manufacturer recommends exclusive use of subsonic ammunition for the DSR-1 Subsonic.

The DSR-50 Sniper Rifle is an enlarged variant of the DSR-1. It has an integrated hydraulic recoil damping system in the buttstock and an integral muzzle brake. The forward-venting muzzle brake, also described as a linear compensator, reduces the perceived muzzle blast. The DSR-50 Sniper Rifle is chambered for the .50 BMG (12.7×99mm NATO) cartridge that is significantly larger than the .338 Lapua Magnum cartridge, which is the biggest available chambering for the DSR-1 rifle. Sniper rifles chambered in .50 BMG are often employed as anti-materiel rifles.

== Users ==
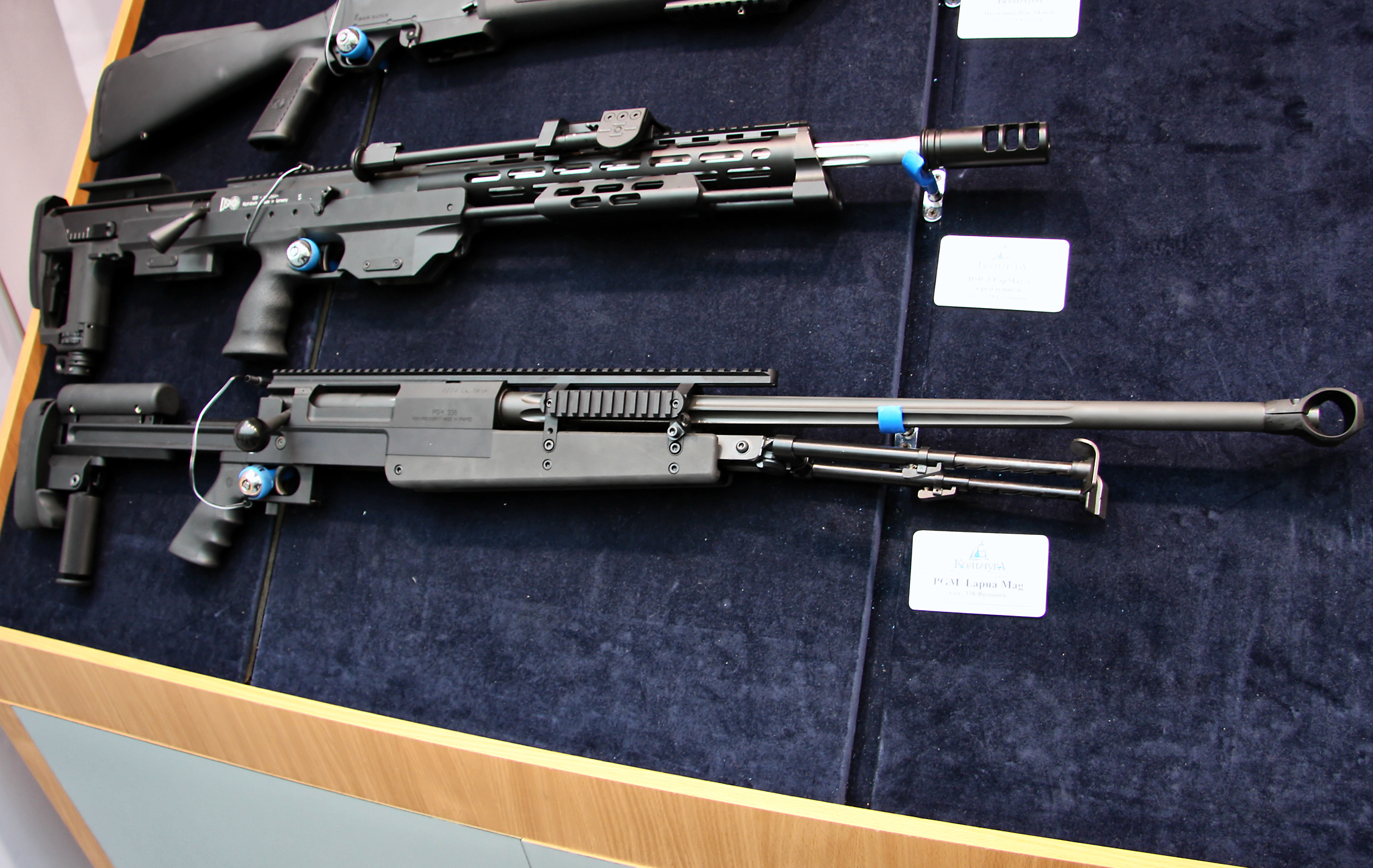
.338 Lapua Magnum chambered DSR-1 (top) and PGM 338 (bottom) sniper rifles

- Denmark: Used by the Danish Navy - Danish Frogman Corps
- Germany: Used by the GSG 9 counter-terrorist group.
- Luxembourg: Used by Unité Spéciale de la Police of the Grand Ducal Police.
- Malaysia: Used by the Malaysian Armed Forces.
- Mauritius: Used by GIPM.
- Spain: Used by Grupo Especial de Operaciones (GEO) of the Cuerpo Nacional de Policía and Grup Especial d'Intervenció (GEI) of the Mossos d'Esquadra
- Taiwan: Used by the Republic of China Army.
- UAE: Used by the Union Defence Force (UAE).

== See also ==
- List of bullpup firearms
- List of sniper rifles
- Desert Tech SRS
