= Unité Spéciale de la Police =

Special Police Unit
- Unité Spéciale de la Police (French)
- Emblem
- Active: 1999 – present
- Country: Luxembourg
- Agency: Grand Ducal Police
- Type: Police tactical unit
- Role: Counter-terrorism; Hostage rescue; Protection of VIPs and important sites
- Operations jurisdiction: National
- Abbreviation: USP

Structure
- Officers: 56

Commanders
- Current commander: Christian Krettels

The Unité Spéciale de la Police (USP) (English: Special Police Unit) is the tier one police tactical unit of the Grand Ducal Police that was created in Luxembourg in 1999. It is tasked with responding to especially dangerous situations such as hostage rescue operations, arrests of dangerous individuals, bomb threats, and dignitary protection duties.

The unit trains abroad with comparable units, in particular the Belgian DSU and German SEK.

== History ==
The USP was formed in 1999 as a merger of the Police Intervention Group (French: Groupe d’intervention de la police) counter-terrorist group and the Gendarmerie Mobile Brigade (French: Brigade mobile de la Gendarmerie).

By 2007, USP had conducted roughly 1,650 missions with an average of 300 assignments annually. Two-thirds of these missions were police arrests or surveillance, and one third of these tasks was close protection or other escort duties.

== Recruitment ==
Applicants to the USP must be younger than 30 years-of-age with several years of experience in the Luxembourg police.

Applicants undergo a selection test lasting one week. The applicants are tested for motivation, teamwork, thinking skills, and physical endurance.

Once selected, candidates are trained over the course of six months in abseiling, basic defusing and disposal of bombs, close protection, close-quarters battle, commando style raids, counter-ambushes, counterterrorism, fast tactical shooting, field intelligence gathering, hand-to-hand combat, infiltrate the area with a helicopter, intervention, living difficult to access terrain, hostage rescue, marksmanship, medevac, mountain warfare, observation, reconnaissance tactics, SERE, tactical emergency medical, and urban warfare.

When training is completed, the candidate is integrated into the USP, and after that they go to advanced tactical training.

== Equipment ==
The Unité Spéciale de la Police uses an assortment of weapons and vehicles including:

| Model | Type | Origin | References |
|---|---|---|---|
| Smith & Wesson Model 586 | Revolver | United States | |
| Smith & Wesson Model 686 | Revolver | United States | |
| Beretta 92F | Semi-automatic pistol | Italy | |
| Glock 17 | Semi-automatic pistol | Austria | |
| Glock 26 | Semi-automatic pistol | Austria | |
| Heckler & Koch P7M13 | Semi-automatic pistol | West Germany | |
| Heckler & Koch USP | Semi-automatic pistol | West Germany | |
| SIG Sauer P226 | Semi-automatic pistol | West Germany | |
| SIG Sauer P228 | Semi-automatic pistol | West Germany | |
| Remington Model 870 | Shotgun | United States | |
| Benelli M3 Super 90 | Shotgun | Italy | |
| Heckler & Koch MP5 | Submachine gun | West Germany | |
| FN P90 TR | Submachine gun | Belgium | |
| Heckler & Koch HK53 | Assault rifle | West Germany | |
| Steyr AUG | Assault rifle | Austria | |
| Brügger & Thomet APR | Sniper rifle | Switzerland | |
| AMP Technical Services DSR-1 | Sniper rifle | Germany | |
| Heckler & Koch PSG1 | Sniper rifle | Germany | |
| FN Minimi | Machine gun | Belgium | |
| FN 303 | Grenade launcherr | Belgium | |
| Heckler & Koch MZP1 | Grenade launcherr | Germany | |
| TM-170 | Armored vehicle | Germany | |

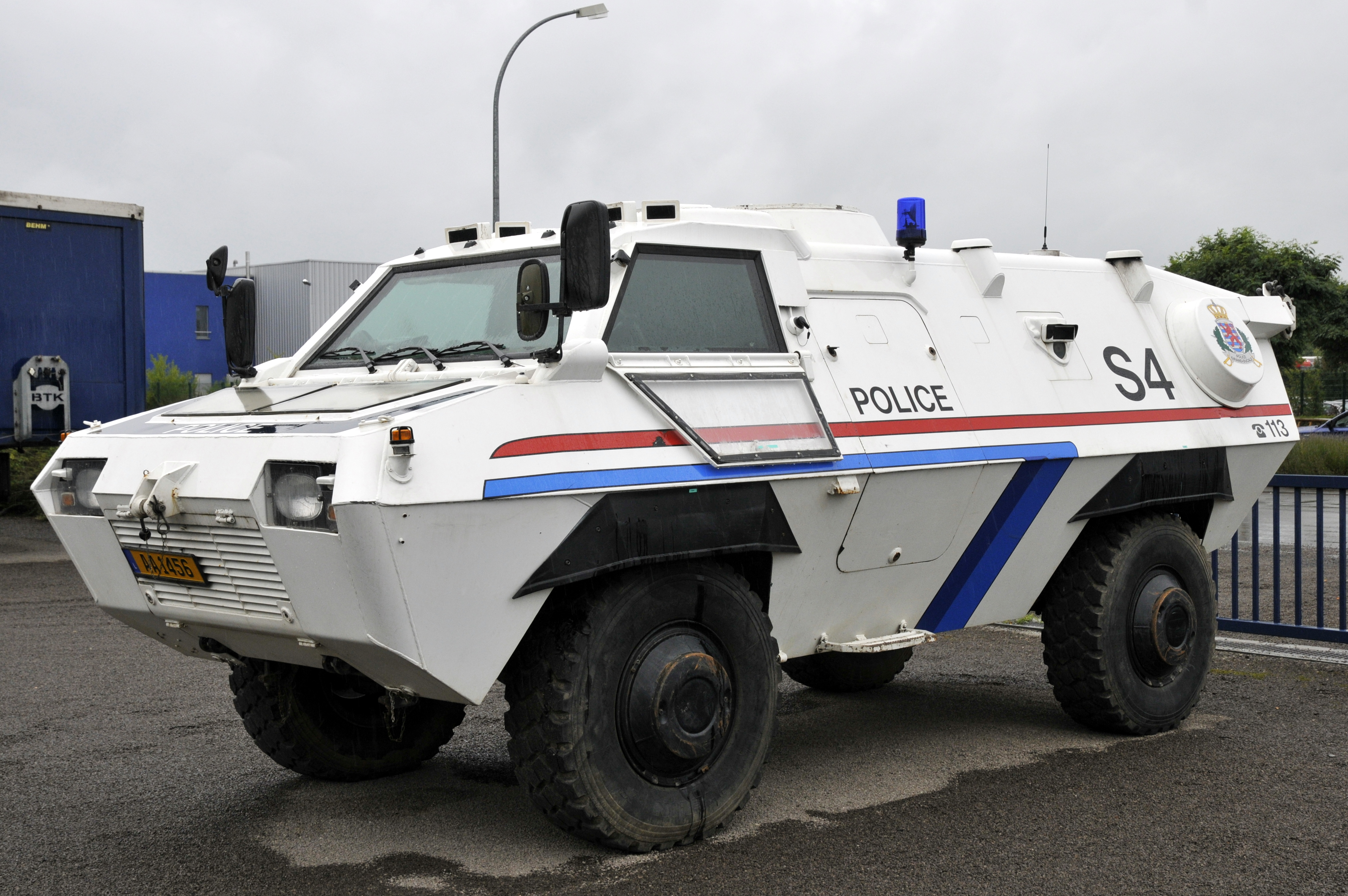
TM-170 of Luxembourg Grand Ducal Police

== Notable operations ==
Notable achievements of the formation include:

- The rescue in 2000 of a large number of Wasserbillig school members that had been taken hostage by a man armed with a pistol, grenade, and knife. The hostage-taker was shot and wounded, and all 45 children and 3 teachers were rescued.
- The rescue in 2002 of the kidnapped son of a Swedish businessman.
- The arrest and dismantling in 2003 of an Al Qaeda cell in Luxembourg.
