= Desert Tech =

American rifle manufacturer

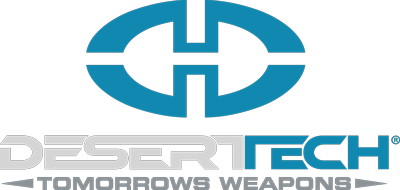
- Industry: Firearms
- Founded: 2007; 19 years ago
- Founders: Nick Young
- Headquarters: West Valley City, Utah, United States
- Area served: Worldwide
- Key people: Nick Young (President and CEO)
- Products: Firearms and ammunition
- Website: deserttech.com

Desert Tech is an American firearms and ammunition manufacturer that primarily produces bullpup rifles. It is financed and owned by members of the Kingston family, founders of the Latter Day Church of Christ, which is a polygamous fundamentalist denomination of the Latter Day Saint Movement.

== History ==
Desert Tech was founded in 2007 as Desert Tactical Arms and later re-branded as Desert Tech in 2013. The company is located in West Valley City, Utah. It is financed and owned by members of the Kingston family, founders of the Latter Day Church of Christ, which is a polygamous fundamentalist denomination of the Latter Day Saint Movement.

In 2014, Desert Tech said that it had declined to participate in the bidding process for a $15 million Pakistani contract, citing concerns about potential diversion of weapons to unauthorized entities. Pakistan embassy official refutes this stating they never made the list of potential contracts

In July 2019, federal prosecutors gave notice that they intended to seize a building Desert Tech was renting for some of their operations. The proposed seizure was part of an investigation into fraud allegations against members of the Kingston family. Desert Tech CEO Nick Young denied the company was involved in the matters under investigation and noted that no public accusation of wrongdoing had been made against his company. Ultimately the building seizure did not proceed.

Donald Trump Jr was shown in a promotion for Desert Tech on July 24, 2020, with the company's CEO and firing the company's sniper rifles. A marketing video on YouTube also includes an image of Donald Jr. Former members of the Latter Day Church of Christ criticized Trump for associating with the company.

== Operations ==
As of May 2018 all Desert Tech's firearms are rifles with a bullpup design. Desert Tech's motto is "Tomorrow's Weapons". It makes three different styles of rifle, the SRS, HTI, and MDRx. According to the company, all of their chassis are multi-caliber and easily changeable from one caliber to another.

The company has a subsidiary in India named Neco Desert Tech Defence.

== Products ==
- Desert Tech HTI (Hard Target Interdiction) Available in .375 Cheytac, .408 Cheytac, .416 Barrett, and .50 BMG
- Desert Tech SRS-A2 (Stealth Recon Scout) Available in .260 Rem., 6.5 CM, .6.5 LM, .308 Win., 300 WM, 300WSM, and 338 LM
- Desert Tech SRS-A2 Covert a shorter variant of the SRS-A1 Available in .260 Rem., 6.5 mm CM, 6.5 mm LM, .308 Win., .300 WM, .300 WSM, and .338 LM
- Desert Tech MDR (Micro Dynamic Rifle) Available in .308 Win/7.62 mm, and .223/5.56 mm/.223 Wylde. Discontinued in 2024.
- Desert Tech MDRx (Micro Dynamic Rifle eXtreme) Available in .308 Win/7.62 mm, .223/5.56 mm/.223 Wylde, 6.5mm Creedmoor, and .300 BLK. Discontinued in 2024.
- Desert Tech Trasol 2.0 Trajectory Solution Software
- Desert Tech Sound Suppressors Available in .338 Win, .30 Caliber
- Desert Tech 1X Reflex Red Dot Sight w/MDR Mount
- Desert Tech Ratchet Compensator Available in 5.56 mm/.223, 7.62 mm/3.08, and 6.5 mm Creedmoor
- Desert Tech Premium Match Ammunition Available in .308 Win, .338 LM, .375 CT, .408 CT, .50 BMG, 6.5 mm Creedmoor
- Desert Tech WLVRN Available in .308 Win/7.62 mm, .223/5.56 mm/.223 Wylde, 6.5mm Creedmoor, and .300 BLK
- Desert Tech Sabertooth Available in .308 Win/7.62 mm, .223/5.56 mm/.223 Wylde
- Desert Tech Infinity 16 Available in .223/5.56 mm

== Awards and recognition ==
The company received a Homeland Security Award in 2015 for counterterrorism support.
