= Desert Tech SRS =

Desert Tech Stealth Recon Scout
- Type: Sniper rifle Bullpup
- Place of origin: United States

Production history
- Manufacturer: Desert Tech
- Unit cost: US$3395 (chassis)
- Produced: 2008–present
- Variants: See Variants

Specifications
- Mass: 10 lb (4.5 kg) (Covert); 11.5 lb (5.2 kg) (.243 Winchester); 11 lb (5.0 kg) (7.62×51mm); 12 lb (5.4 kg) (.300 Winchester Short Magnum); 12.37 lb (5.6 kg) (.338 Lapua Magnum)
- Length: 26 in (660.4 mm) (Covert); 33.5 in (850.9 mm) (.243 Winchester); 31.5 in (800.1 mm) (7.62×51mm); 35.5 in (901.7 mm) (.300 Winchester Magnum); 37.5 in (952.5 mm) (.338 Lapua Magnum)
- Barrel length: 16 in (406.4 mm) (Covert); 24 in (609.6 mm) (.243 Winchester); 22 in (558.8 mm) (7.62×51mm); 26 in (660.4 mm) (.300 Winchester Magnum); 26 in (660.4 mm) (.338 Lapua Magnum)
- Cartridge: .243 Winchester; 7.62×51mm NATO; .308 Winchester; .300 Winchester Magnum; .338 Lapua Magnum; .338 Norma Magnum
- Action: Bolt action
- Effective firing range: 1,737.36 metres (1,900.00 yd) (.338 Norma Magnum)
- Feed system: 5-round detachable box magazine (.338 Lapua Magnum); 6-round detachable box magazine (.300 Winchester); 7-round detachable box magazine (.243 Winchester, .308 Winchester)
- Sights: Telescopic sight

The Desert Tech Stealth Recon Scout (SRS) is a bolt-action sniper rifle developed by the Utah-based firearm manufacturer Desert Tech (formerly Desert Tactical Arms). It was unveiled at the 2008 SHOT Show. It is known for its bullpup design.

A shorter variant of the SRS, called the SRS Covert, shares all the same features of the SRS, but uses shorter barrels and therefore a shorter handguard.

== History ==
On 1 March 2021, Desert Tech issued a product recall of SRS rifles made between 8 December 2020 and 5 March, due to a mistake in heat treatment during manufacture, resulting in strikers that could be destroyed upon firing.

== Design and features ==
The Stealth Recon Scout is notably unusual in that it is one of the few sniper rifles that is a bullpup bolt-action layout. This gives the rifle a relatively compact design, claimed to be 11 inches (280 mm) shorter than conventional sniper rifles. Because of the bullpup layout, the magazine and bolt are behind the pistol grip, and therefore the operation is slightly different from most other conventional designs. Its design is very similar to the German DSR-1, which preceded the SRS by 8 years. This layout also shifts more weight to the rear of the rifle; the manufacturer claims that this creates a central balancing point. The sling points are balanced with the centerline of the weapon to ensure it lies flat when slung. It features an adjustable cheekrest, and a raised, contoured buttpad helps to seat it more securely into the shooter's shoulder. The gun weighs 10.5 lbs at its lightest, which makes it easy to use with a bipod or large scope.

The Stealth Recon Scout was originally designed around the .338 Lapua Magnum cartridge, but is also available in many other calibers, including; .260 Remington, 6.5mm Creedmoor, 6.5×47mm Lapua, 7mm WSM, .308 Winchester, and .300 Winchester Magnum — all of which can be changed in a quick conversion. The SRS is fed from a five-round box magazine, and uses a 22–26 in (560–660 mm) match fluted, free floated barrel. While the barrel is standard with a muzzle brake, it can be removed to allow access to a threaded muzzle for the attachment of a suppressor. The rifle is guaranteed to have a standard 0.5 moa (0.15 mrad) accuracy and uses a 1-6 lbs (4-27 N) adjustable match trigger.

The rifle is constructed of polymer (available in olive drab, tan, or black), aluminum, and steel. The handguard and upper receiver use a Picatinny rail system for attaching accessories such as a bipod or a telescopic sight. The safety can be operated without removing the user's hand from the pistol grip, and the magazine release can be operated with one hand.

A shorter variant of the SRS, called the SRS Covert, shares all the same features of the SRS, but uses shorter barrels and therefore a shorter handguard. The short barreled version of the rifle as stated by the manufacturer is to give users, (particularly military and law enforcement) a more compact and maneuverable gun for close quarters. It uses 16" and 18" barrels in some of the above-mentioned calibers.

== Variants ==
- Stealth Recon Scout (SRS)
  - SRS-A1
  - SRS-A2 (replaced A1 version)
- Stealth Recon Scout Covert
  - SRS-A1 Covert
  - SRS-A2 Covert (replaced A1 version)
  - SRS-M2

== Users ==
- Czech Republic: Czech Ministry of Defence; selected in 2015.
- Georgia: Defense Forces of Georgia. First country to receive the weapon for its armed forces. Used also by law enforcement and state security agencies. Suppressors locally produced.
- Indonesia: Indonesian National Armed Forces. SRS-A2 Covert used by Combat Reconnaissance Platoon unit.
- Lithuania: Lithuanian Armed Forces; selected in 2015.
- Thailand: Royal Thai Police; selected in 2012.
- Saudi Arabia: Saudi Royal Guard Regiment; selected in 2013.
- Ukraine: Ukraine State Guard; selected in 2016.

== Gallery ==
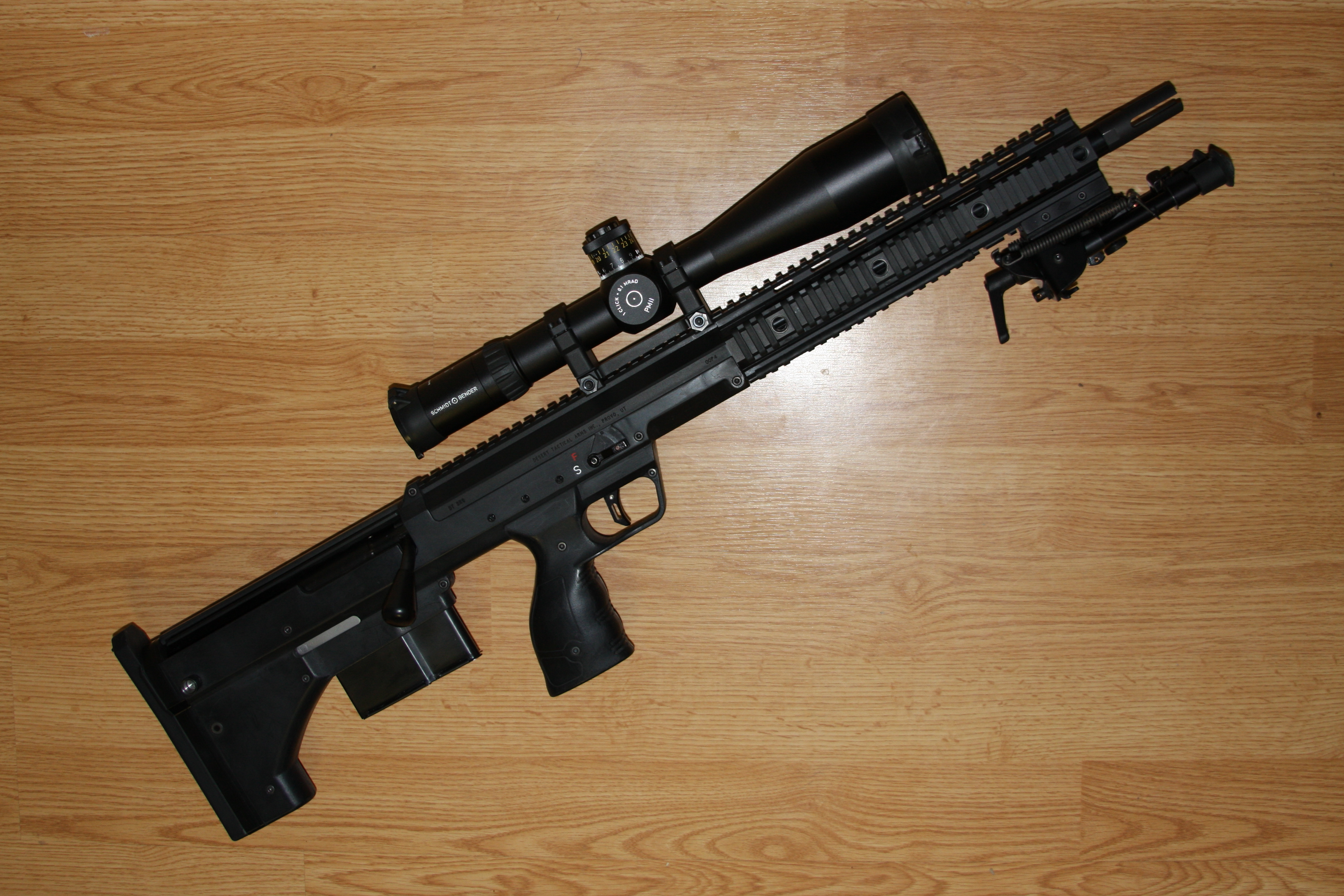
Stealth Recon Scout .308 with flash hider

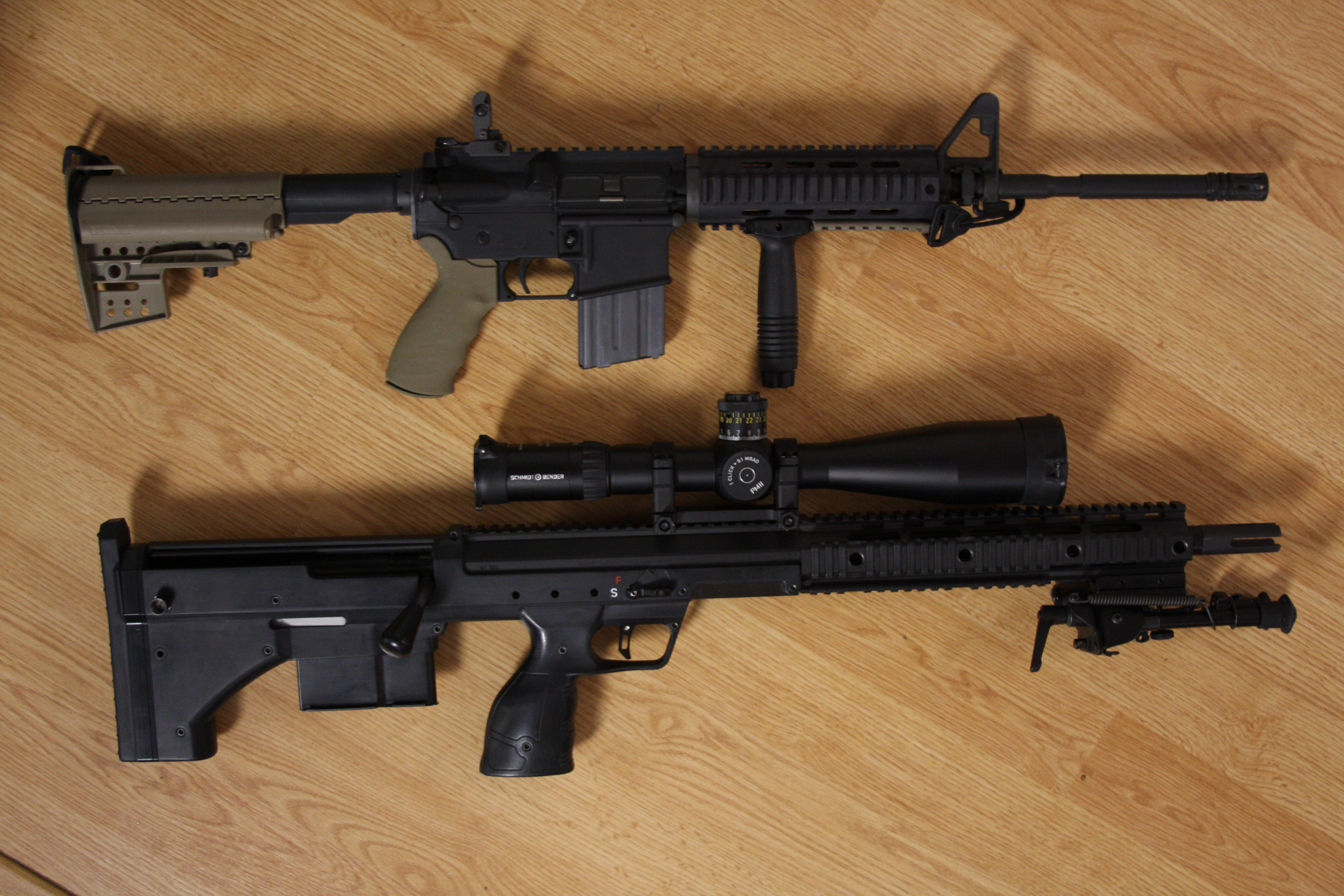
Stealth Recon Scout .308 with an AR-15

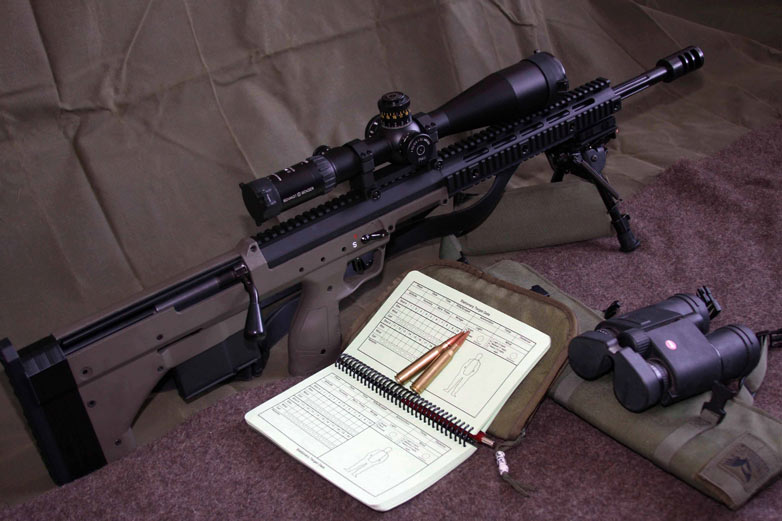
Stealth Recon Scout .338 with muzzle brake

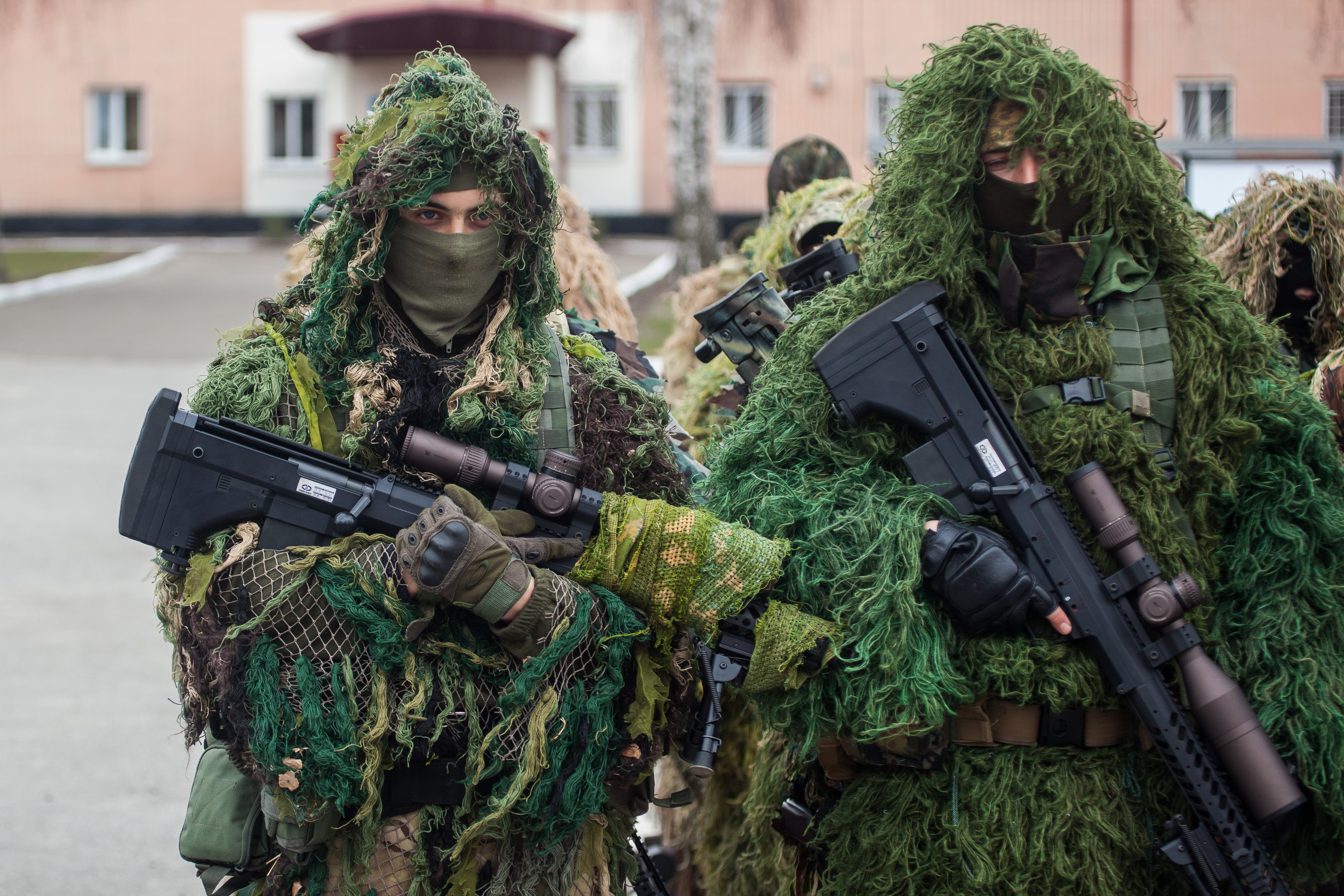
Ukrainian National Guard soldiers

== See also ==
- List of bullpup firearms
- List of sniper rifles
- Accuracy International AWM
- Barrett M95
- Barrett M98B
- Barrett M99
- DSR-Precision DSR-1
- Sako TRG
- Walther WA 2000
