= A-91 =

Russian bullpup assault rifle

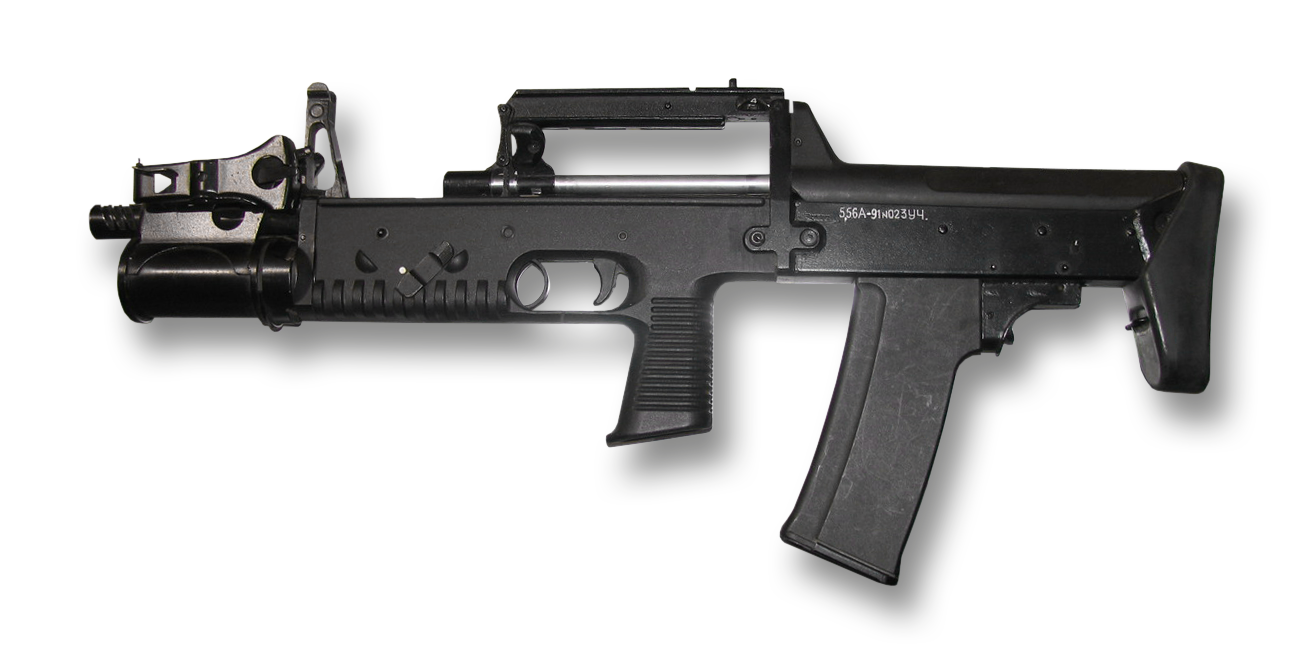
- 5.56×45mm NATO variant of the A-91
- Type: Bullpup Assault rifle
- Place of origin: Soviet Union

Service history
- In service: 1990–present
- Used by: Russian Police, Military Services

Production history
- Designer: KBP Instrument Design Bureau
- Designed: 1990
- Manufacturer: KBP Instrument Design Bureau
- Produced: 1991
- Variants: 5,56 A-91, A-91M

Specifications
- Mass: 4.3 kg (9.48 lb) (A-91 without the grenade launcher); 4.4 kg (9.70 lb) (5,56A-91 with the grenade launcher)
- Length: 660 mm (26.0 in); 670 mm (26.4 in) (5,56A-91)
- Barrel length: 415 mm (16.3 in)
- Width: 56 mm (2.2 in); 64 mm (2.5 in) (5,56А-91)
- Height: 291 mm (11.5 in); 292 mm (11.5 in) (5,56A-91)
- Cartridge: 7.62×39mm 5.45×39mm 5.56×45mm NATO (5,56A-91); 40 mm caseless (grenade launcher)
- Caliber: 7.62×39mm, 5.45×39mm, 5.56×45mm NATO
- Action: Gas-operated, rotating bolt
- Rate of fire: 600–800 rounds/min 700 rounds/min (5,56A-91)
- Muzzle velocity: 715 (А-91), 910 (5,56А-91)
- Effective firing range: 300 m 300 m (5,56A-91); 400 m (grenade launcher)
- Feed system: 30-round detachable box magazine
- Sights: Dioptric sight, Grenade launcher sight

The A-91 is a Russian bullpup assault rifle developed by the KBP Instrument Design Bureau during the 1990s. It is an evolution of the earlier 9A-91 carbine, primarily designed to be compact, reliable, and versatile in urban combat scenarios. The rifle is notable for its integrated 40mm grenade launcher and the use of a bullpup configuration, which positions the magazine behind the trigger, allowing for a more compact design without sacrificing barrel length.

== Design and Features ==
The A-91 uses a gas-operated system with a rotating bolt, similar to the AK-47 and other Kalashnikov designs. However, unlike most Russian rifles, it adopts a bullpup layout, which reduces the overall length while maintaining a full-length barrel, improving handling in confined spaces.

The rifle can be chambered in multiple calibers, including the standard Russian 5.45×39mm and 7.62×39mm rounds, as well as the NATO- standard 5.56×45mm NATO cartridge. Its rate of fire is approximately 600 rounds per minute, with a muzzle velocity of 880 m/s.

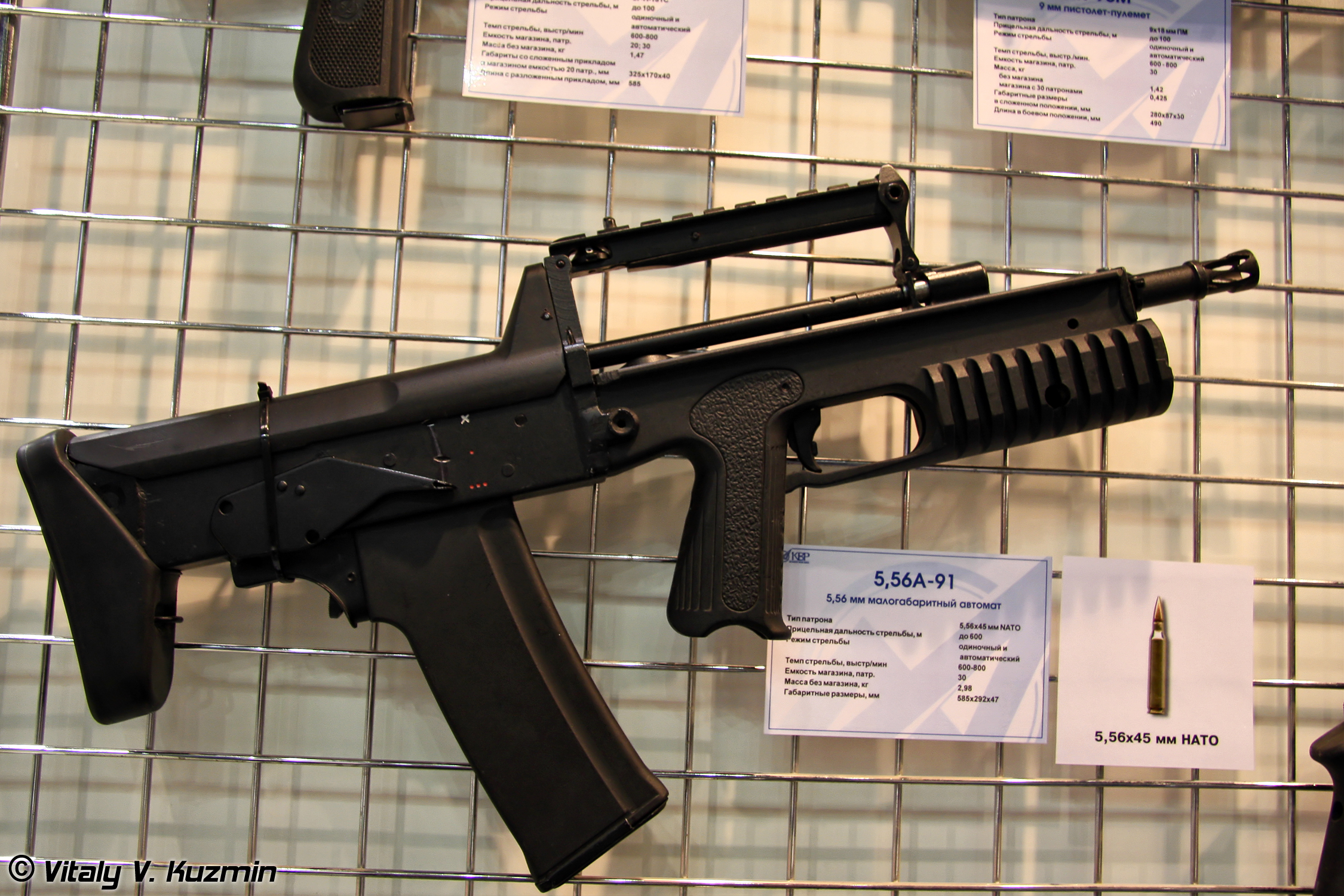
A-91 displayed with its grenade launcher, below the front barrel.

One of the most notable features of the A-91 is its integrated under-barrel grenade launcher, designed to fire standard 40mm grenades such as the VOG-25. The launcher has a range of up to 400 meters. The rifle also has a spent-case ejection system that ejects casings forward, preventing interference with the user's face or arms when firing from the left shoulder.

== Development ==
The A-91 was designed by the KBP Instrument Design Bureau as a successor to the 9A-91 carbine, with a focus on creating a weapon suited for both conventional and special operations forces. The bullpup design was chosen for its compact size and ease of handling in close-quarter combat (CQB). Initial production began in the 1990s, and the rifle has since been used in various roles within the Russian military.

== Variants ==
There are several variants of the A-91, including different configurations for different calibers and missions:

- A-91M: The most modern variant, featuring updated materials and improved ergonomic features. Chambered in both 5.45×39mm and 7.62×39mm.

== Usage ==
The A-91 is in limited service with the Russian Armed Forces and various special forces units. Its compact design and versatility make it suitable for urban combat and special operations, although it has not seen widespread adoption compared to more traditional Kalashnikov designs like the AK-74 and its variants.

== See also ==
- 9A-91 carbine
- OTs-14 Groza
- AK-74
- List of assault rifles

== Gallery ==
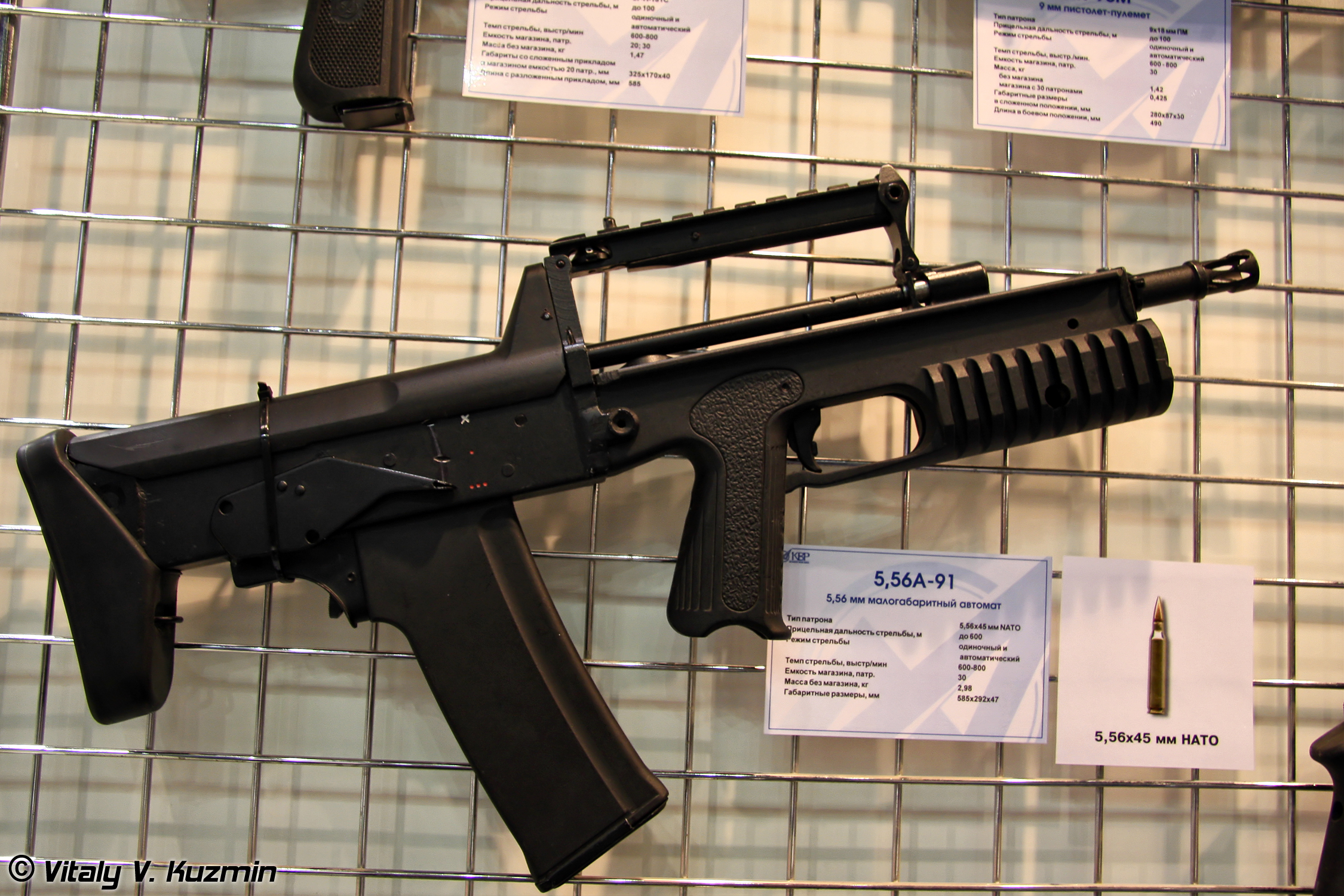
The A-91 at Interpolitex 2011.

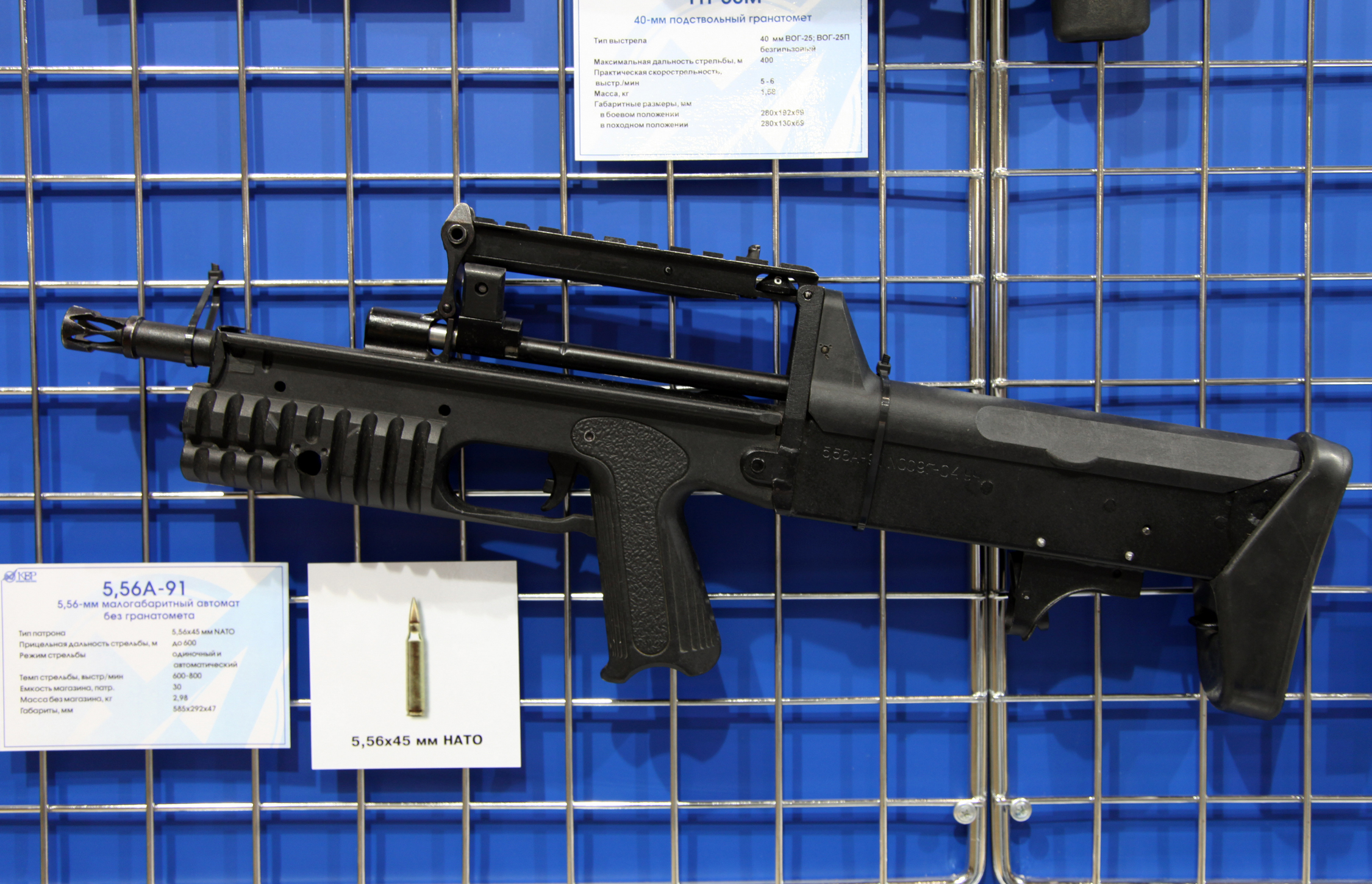
The A-91 without a magazine at Interpolitex 2012.

== See also ==
- ADS amphibious rifle
