= Vepr =

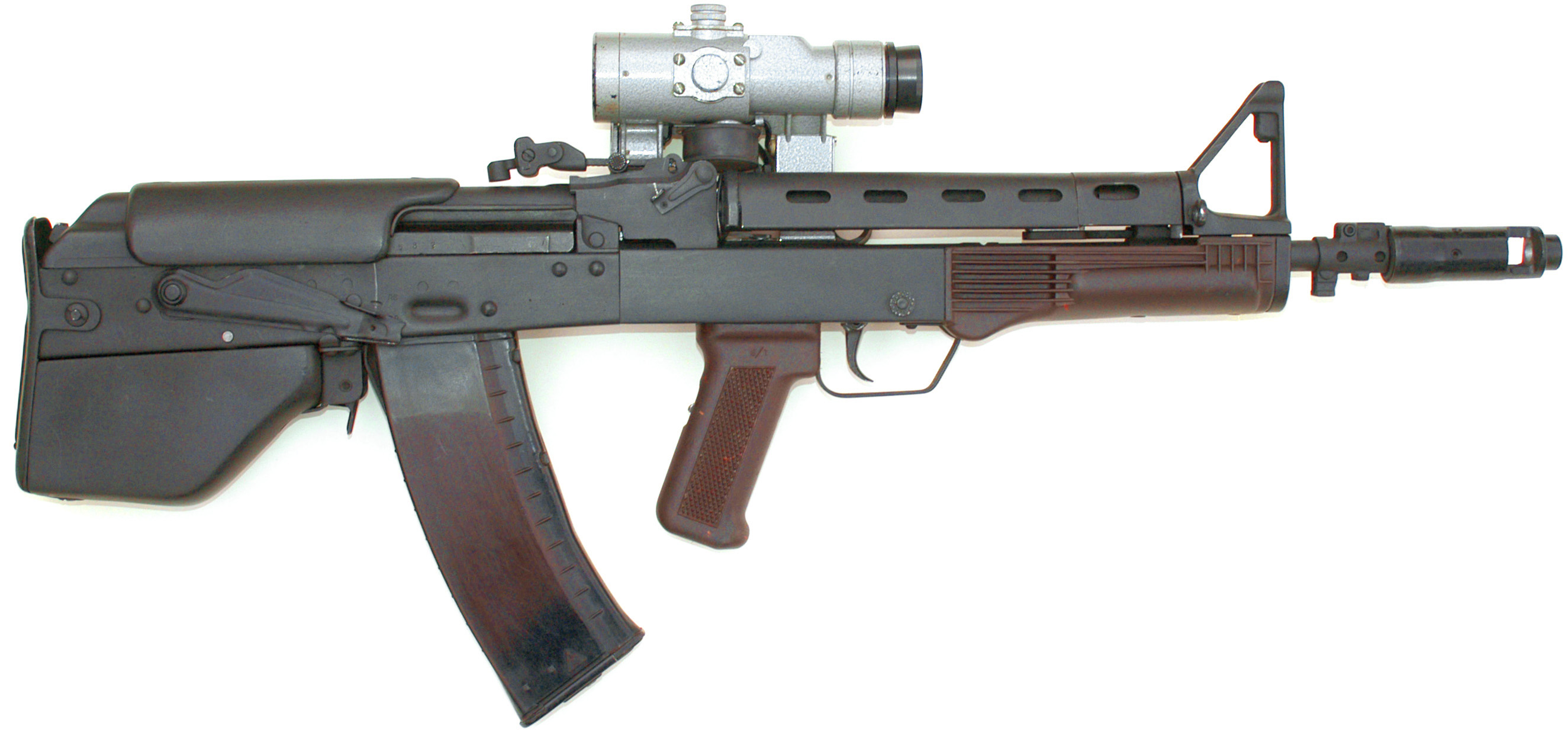
- Vepr-1
- Type: Bullpup Assault rifle
- Place of origin: Ukraine

Production history
- Designer: S. Naumov
- Designed: 2001–2003
- Manufacturer: National Space Agency; R&D Center for precision engineering

Specifications
- Mass: 3.45 kg
- Length: 702 mm
- Barrel length: 415 mm
- Caliber: 5.45×39mm
- Action: Gas-operated, rotating bolt
- Rate of fire: 600–650 rounds/min
- Feed system: 30-round detachable box magazine
- Sights: Iron sights

The Vepr (Ukrainian: Вепр, lit. 'wild boar') is the first Ukrainian-made assault rifle, designed in 1993–1994 by the State Space Agency of Ukraine and announced in 2003.

== History ==
Prior to the development of the Vepr, the personnel of the Armed Forces of Ukraine were equipped mainly with the Soviet AKM and AK-74 assault rifle designs.

In 1993, specialists at the artillery base of the Ministry of Defense in Nizhyn (Chernihiv region) began work on the creation of a machine gun "bullpup" on the basis of the RPK chambered in 7.62×39mm. In 1994, a machine gun was created, named the "Vepr" (Boar) model № 1.

In 1994, samples № 2 and № 3 were also developed based on the RPK-74 in 5.45×39mm and AKM in 7.62×39mm. Later, the SKS carbine was redesigned - № 4. The cost of converting one weapon into a "bullpup" at that time was ₴300.

Anatoly Anatolyev, Vladimir Sheiko, and Andrey Zharkov patented their invention, but in 2001, the Nizhyn designers were summoned by management and ordered to transfer all documentation from the project to the Kyiv Radio Plant for completion.

The first Vepr rifle was shown on 28 August 2003. Only ten Veprs were made until 9 October 2004.

== Design ==
It is one of several bullpup conversions of the conventional Soviet AK-family design, along with the Polish Kbk wz. 2005 Jantar, the Chinese Norinco Type 86S, the Russian OTs-14 Groza and the Finnish Valmet M82.

Although the Vepr has been proclaimed as a revolutionary upgrade to the AK-74, it is, in fact, an interesting yet fairly simple modification of the basic AK-74 system in a bullpup design, with the following modifications:

- The standard gas-operated, rotating-bolt AK-74 mechanism is removed from its furniture and a new butt plate is mounted directly on the rear of the receiver.
- A polymer cheek rest is fitted to the receiver cover.
- The trigger and pistol grip are placed in front of the magazine.
- The cocking handle is removed from the bolt carrier and a new cocking handle arrangement is placed on the left side of the forearm.

=== Common characteristics with the AK-74 ===
The weapon still fires 5.45×39mm ammunition from 30-round magazines at an approximate rate of fire of 600 to 650 rounds per minute, the barrel length remains the same and the muzzle brake has been retained, which suggests that the Vepr's ballistic performance should be identical to that of the AK-74.

The weapon's weight is almost the same as that of the AK-74M variant, and its length is comparable to that of a folding-stock AK with the stock folded.

The main advantage of the bullpup layout thus lies in the fact that the weapon becomes much shorter and thus easier to store, to carry and to handle in confined spaces.

However, the bullpup's overall superiority to conventional rifle configurations, in which the magazine and chamber are in front of the trigger and pistol grip rather than behind, has yet to be seen.

=== Right ejection only ===
The Vepr suffers the same issue as that of the British SA80, which it does not favour ambidextrous operation, for three reasons:

- Like the AK-74, the weapon does not have ambidextrous ejection ports, which becomes a problem because a right-ejecting bullpup weapon, held left-handed, presents the ejection port directly against the operator's face, which will present itself as a problem with hot casings striking the user.
- The Vepr still uses the standard Kalashnikov-type combined safety lever / fire selector lever arrangement without much revision. In the original weapon, the selector lever was noted for its relatively uncommon safe-auto-semi options sequence (rather than the typical safe-semi-auto), but the only real problems were that the lever was made infamous for its characteristic "Kalashnikov Clack" and it could not be operated without letting go of either the pistol grip or the forearm. The use of the same selector lever in a bullpup configuration adds further problems: the lack of any other form of fire selector device, which would ideally be placed as close to the trigger as possible, results in awkward handling with the weapon shouldered, especially when holding it left-handed;
- The charging handle is still placed to one side, now favouring right-handed operators but making it difficult to work the cocking handle with the right hand while holding the weapon left-handed.

=== Accessories ===
The Vepr includes adjustable open sights and a conventional side mount, on the left, for day or night scopes.

The front sight is strikingly similar to that of the American M16 series of rifles. A relatively large red dot sight of Ukrainian production can also be fitted as standard.

The latest versions of the Vepr also include an integral 40mm underslung grenade launcher, with a dual trigger layout in which the front trigger fires the grenade launcher and the rear trigger fires the rifle.

== Gallery ==
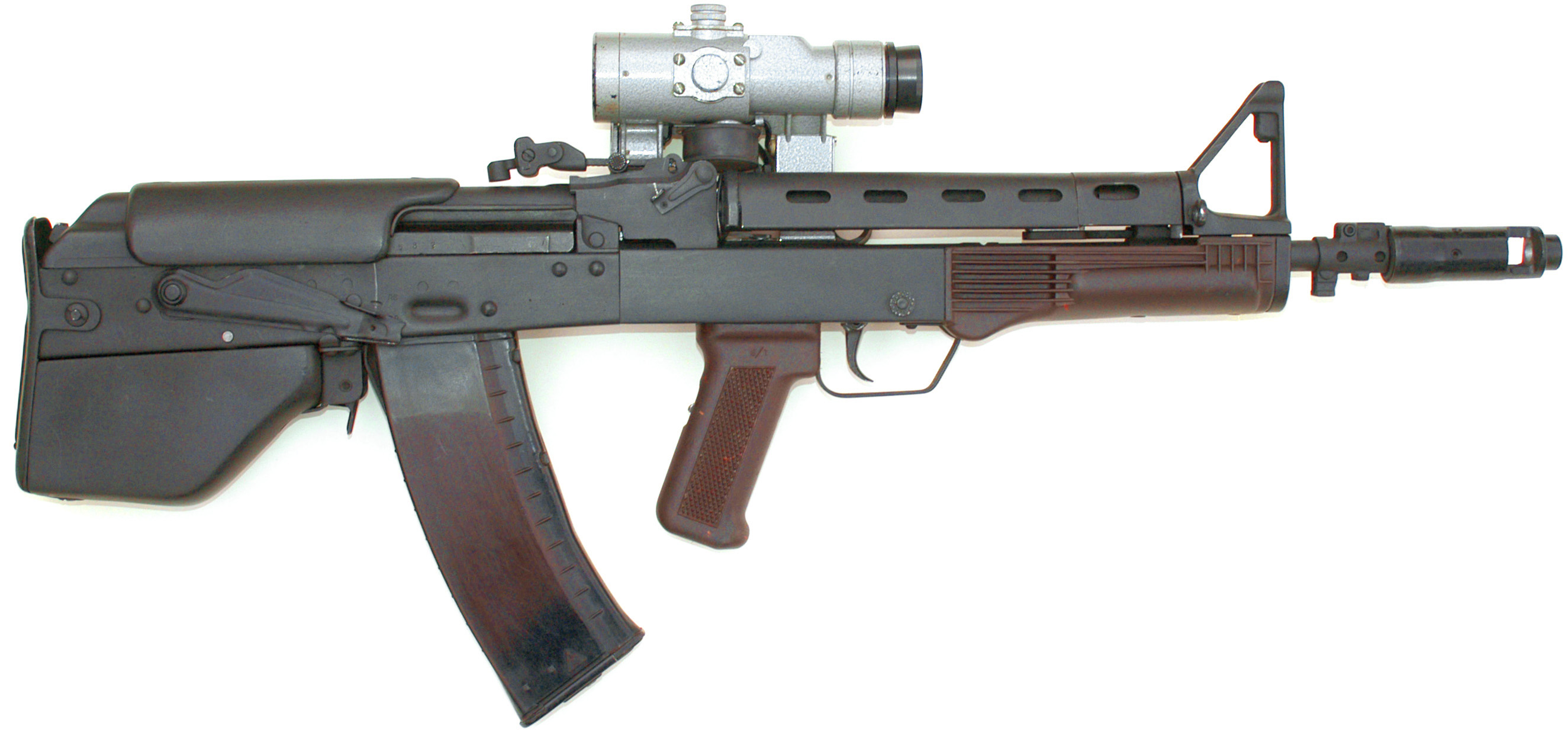

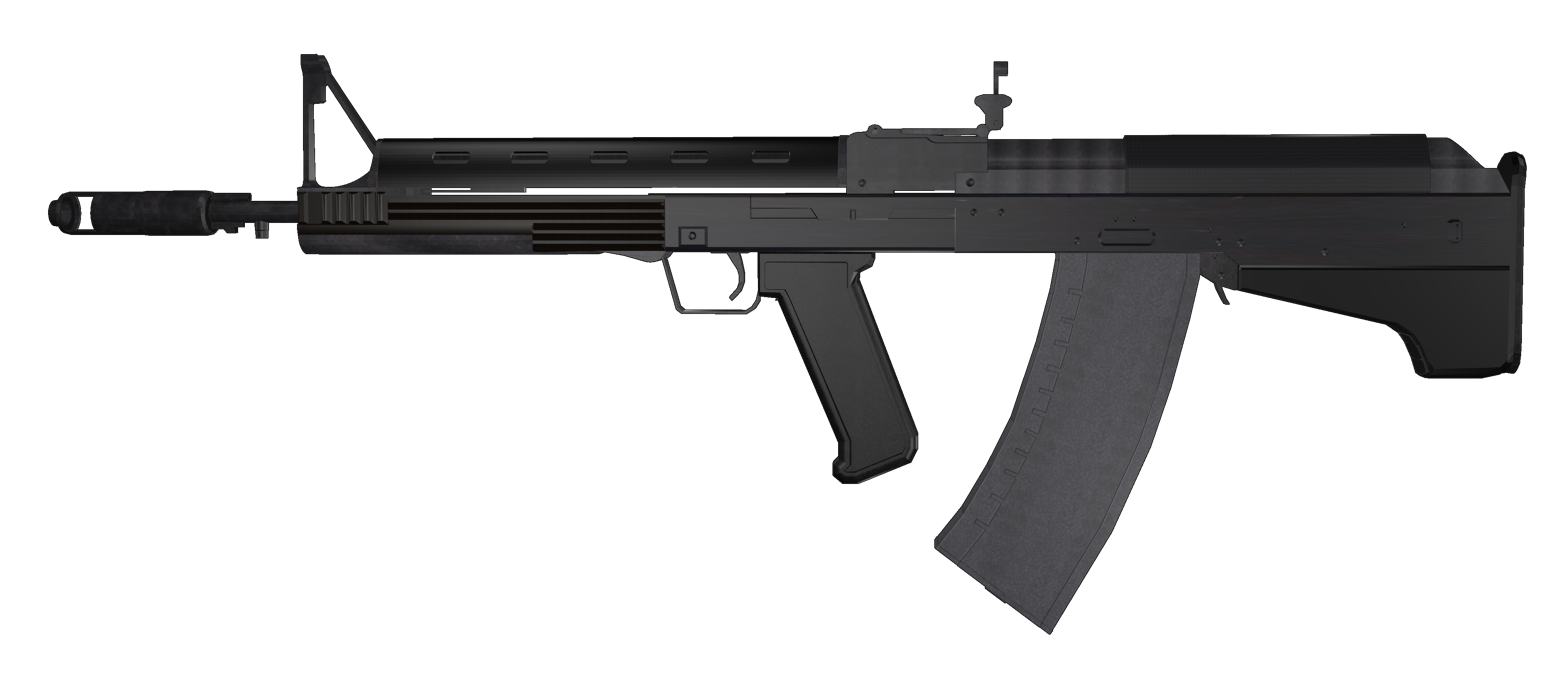

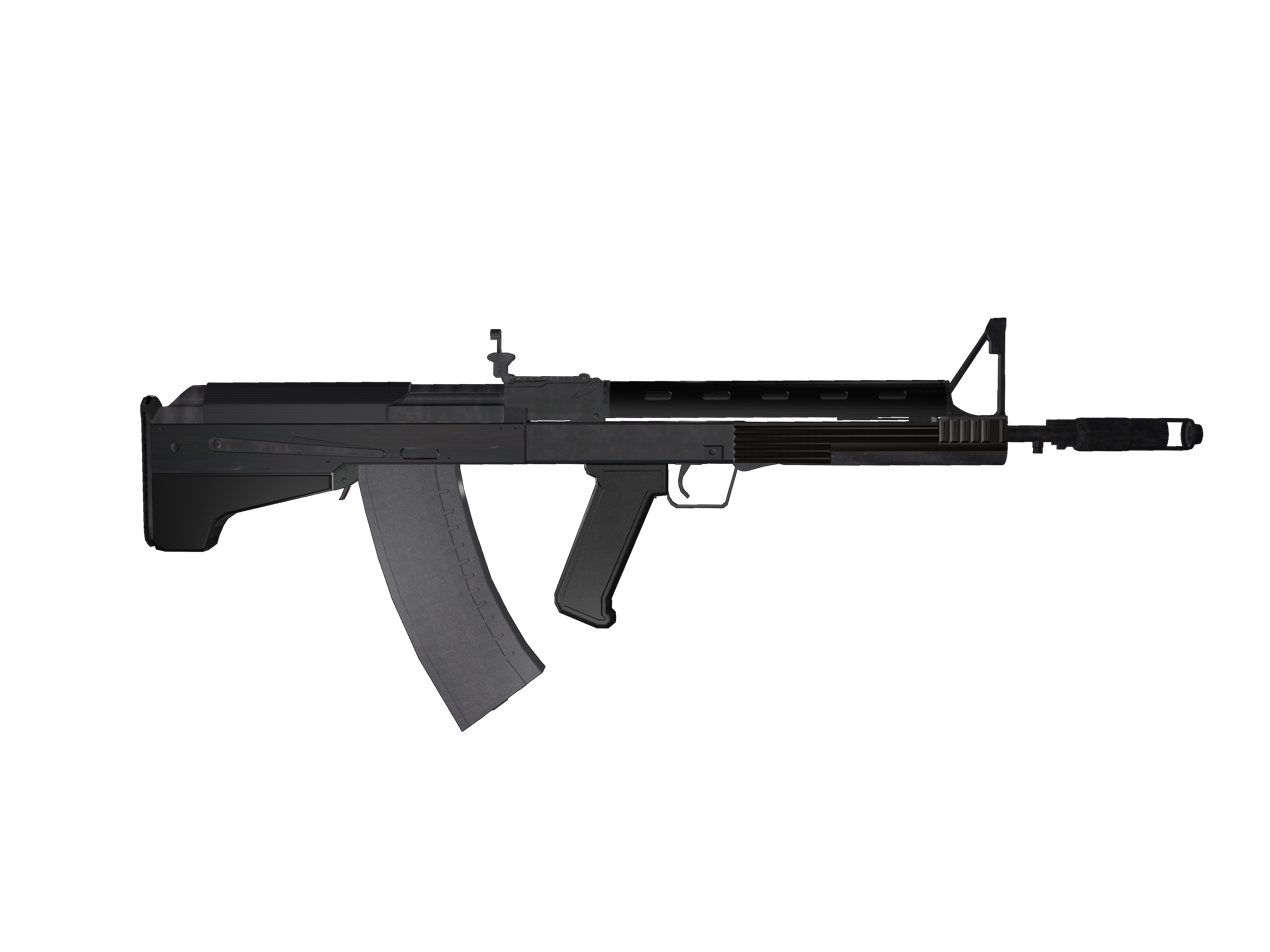

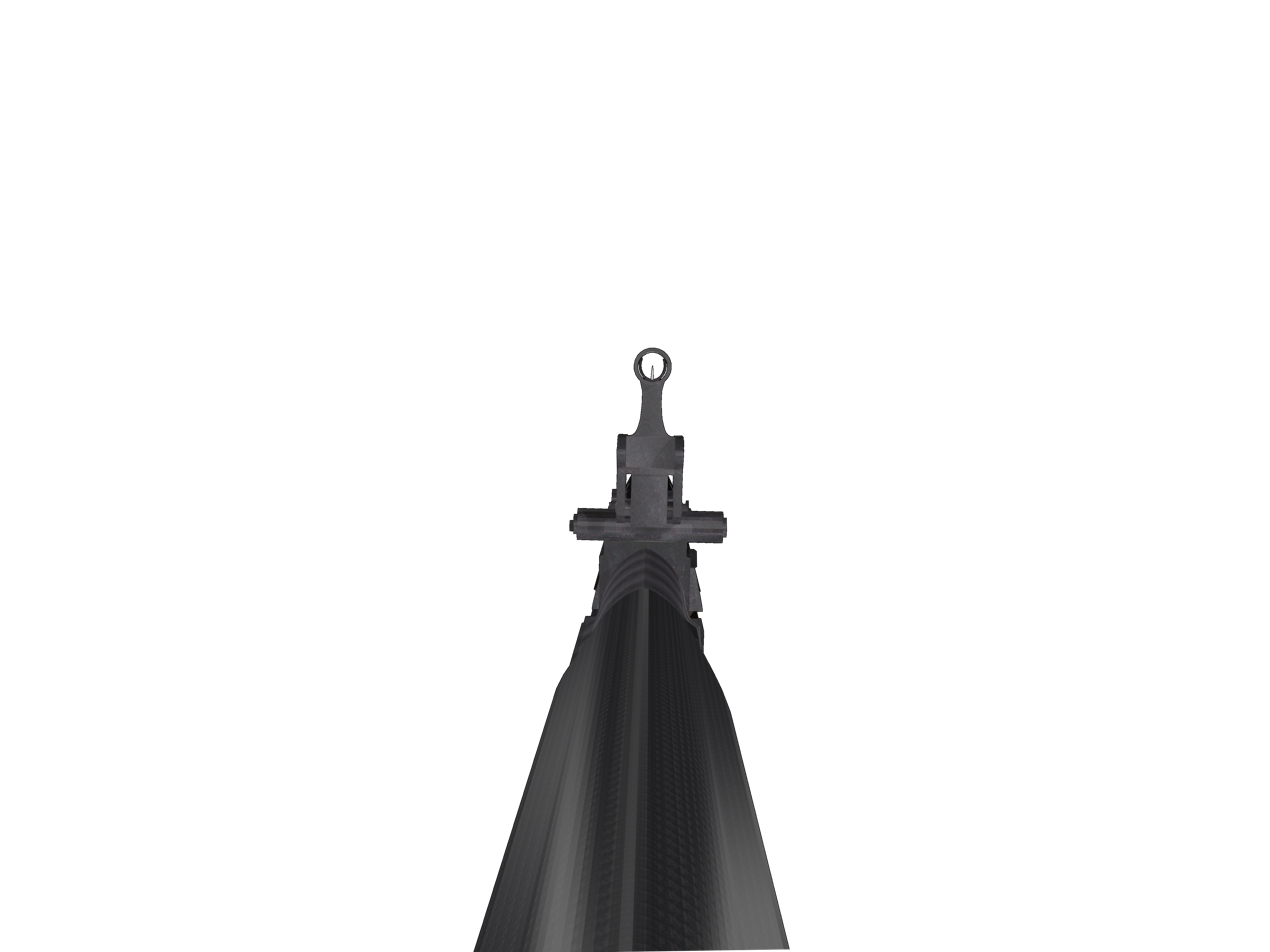

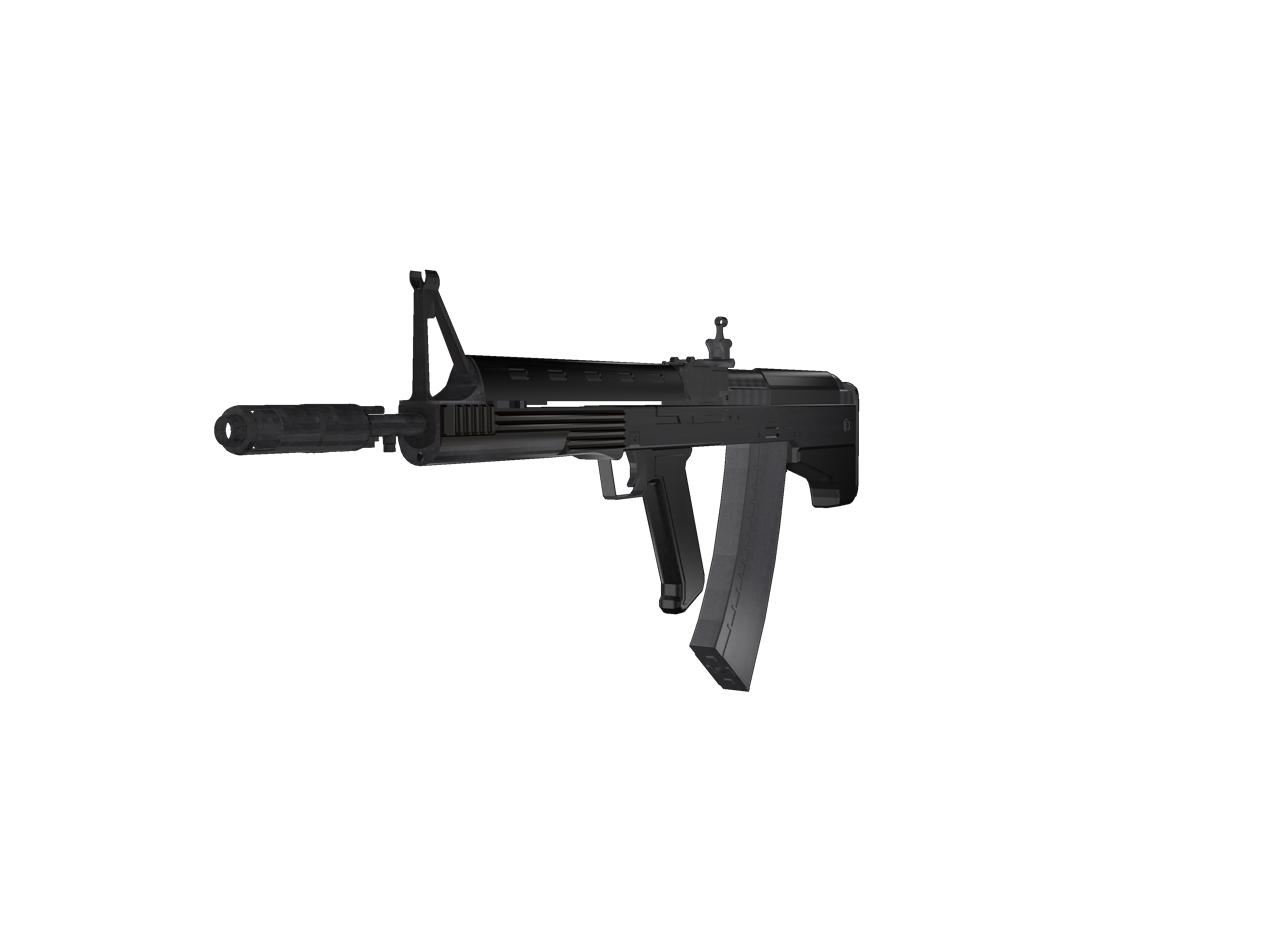

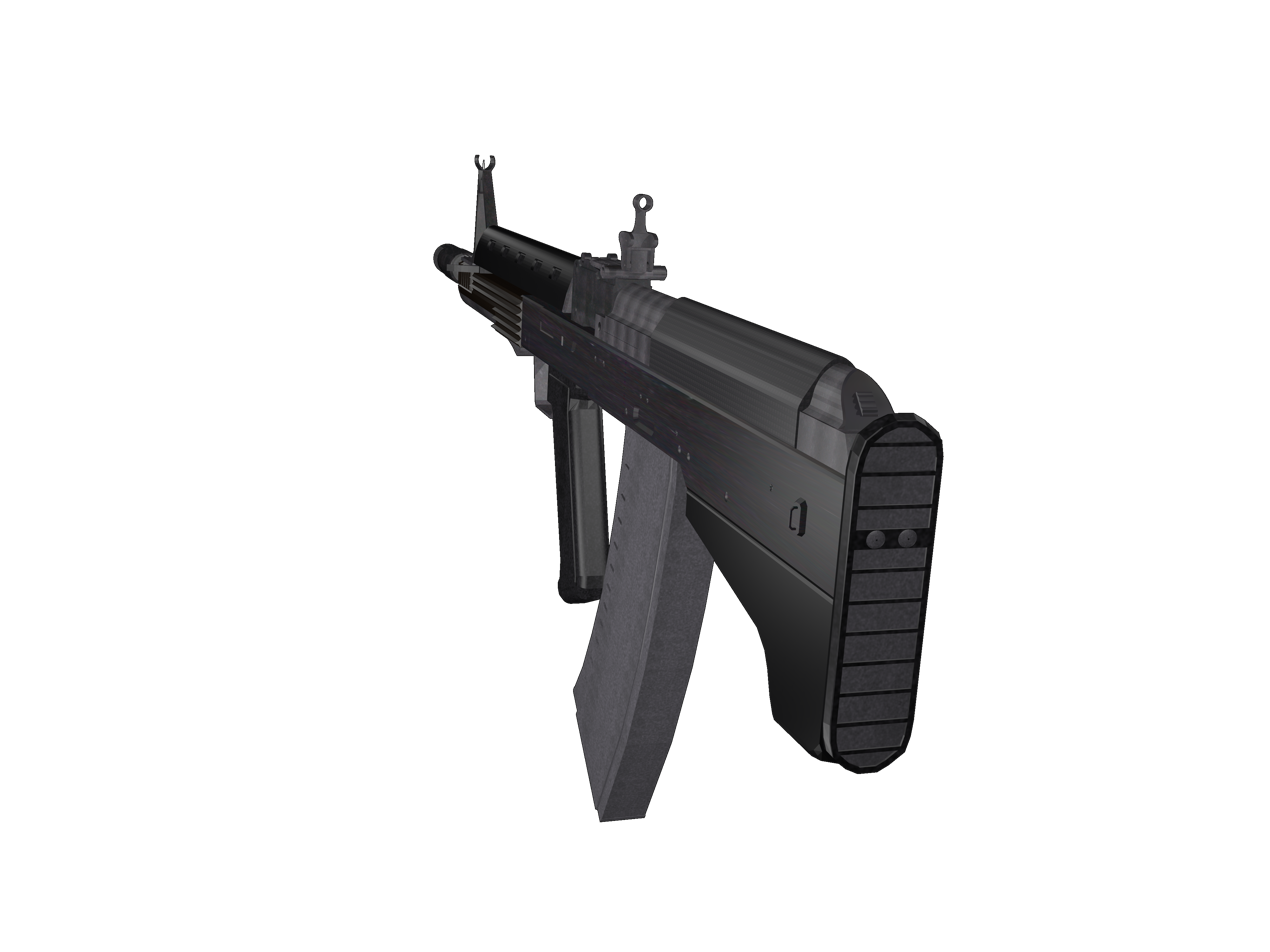

== Adoption ==
Ukraine's Ministry of Defense declared intentions to purchase thousands of Veprs by 2010 but by March 2014 there were no Veprs in use by the Ukrainian Army.

Since 2009 a Ukrainian gun manufacturer (RPC Fort) is offering firearms in "western" calibers on the Ukrainian market - such as the Israeli Tavor assault rifle, IWI Negev light machine gun and Galil sniper rifle - the future of this weapon in Ukrainian service may be in jeopardy.

In March 2019, it was announced that the National Police of Ukraine would replace Kalashnikov assault rifles with HK MP5 submachine guns. As of 2024, most Ukrainian personnel still use AK-74s.

The failure of the Vepr to be adopted led to the creation of the Malyuk.
