= Norinco Type 86S =

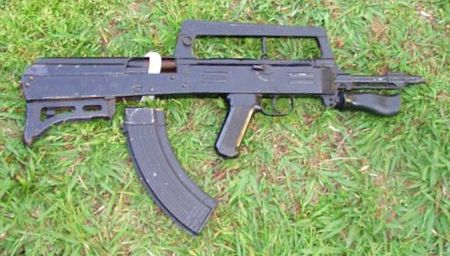
- The Norinco Type 86S
- Type: Bullpup rifle
- Place of origin: China

Production history
- Manufacturer: Norinco
- Produced: 1980s
- No. built: 2000

Specifications
- Mass: 3.59 kg (empty)
- Length: 667 mm (26 inches)
- Barrel length: 438 mm (17 inches)
- Cartridge: 7.62×39mm
- Caliber: 7.62mm
- Action: Gas-operated, rotating bolt
- Rate of fire: 600 rounds/min
- Muzzle velocity: 710 m/s
- Effective firing range: 300 m
- Maximum firing range: 400 m
- Feed system: 30-round detachable box magazine
- Sights: Open, Iron sight; Scopes possible to put on carry handle

The Norinco Type 86S (Chinese: 86S自动步枪; pinyin: 86S zìdòng bùqiāng; lit. '86S Automatic Rifle') is an AKM-type bullpup rifle that was produced by Norinco. Many major parts are interchangeable with other standard Kalashnikov rifles.

The Type 86S was designed for export into the United States, where civilian ownership of short-barreled rifles is restricted by law.

== History ==
Rifles with bullpup configurations were tested by Norinco in early 1980s, which resulted in the WTC-1 and WTC-2 bullpup prototypes in 1983. Two prototypes shared similar elements with the Type 86S.

== Design ==
The Type 86S design departs from the AK-47 in several ways. The trigger-sear-hammer group is housed in a rear extension of the receiver, well behind the pistol grip. The operating mechanism is exactly the same as in the standard AK-47/AKM, with the exception of a connecting rod between the trigger and sear. The weapon itself is built based on the Type 56.

The selector switch/safety is quite different from the sheet metal lever found on the standard AK-47/AKM. The Type 86S selector/safety is thumb-shaped and located on the right side of the receiver, directly above the pistol grip. The selector consists of safe and semi-auto.

The carrying handle has integral sights built in, which was based on the FAMAS rifle. A bayonet can also be attached underneath the barrel.

A vertical, spring-loaded, plastic folding foregrip is mounted on the front of the receiver. When not in use, it folds forward beneath the barrel. The magazine well is located to the rear of the pistol grip and will accept 10-, 20-, and 30-round magazines as well as drum magazines. The rear sight is an aperture/peep sight mounted on a cam.

Turning the adjustment knob sets the rear sight for 100-, 200-, or 300-meter ranges. Both the front and rear sight are mounted on the combination gas tube and hand guard which clamps tightly onto the receiver.

Two types of Type 86S rifles were made. One consist of Type 86S rifles with a straight charging handle while another has curved charging handles.

== Status ==
The Type 86S was once imported to the United States by China Sports (Norinco's import/export arm in that country), intended for the civilian market. Fewer than 2,000 Type 86S rifles were imported into the US during the late 1980s before the import of semi-automatic rifles was banned in 1989.

The Type 86S is considered an assault weapon, preventing it from being manufactured in the US for 10 years in accordance with the Violent Crime Control and Law Enforcement Act bill, passed on September 13, 1994. The law sunsetted and expired in 2004.

== See also ==
- QBZ-95
- OTs-14 Groza
- Vepr
- Valmet M82

== Bibliography ==
- Roodhorst, Cor (2015). The Kalashnikov Encyclopedia: Recognition and Weapon Forensic Guide for Kalashnikov Arms and Derivatives I: Albania-Israel. Netherlands: Roodhorst Publications. ISBN 978-90-9027549-9.
