= Thorneycroft carbine =

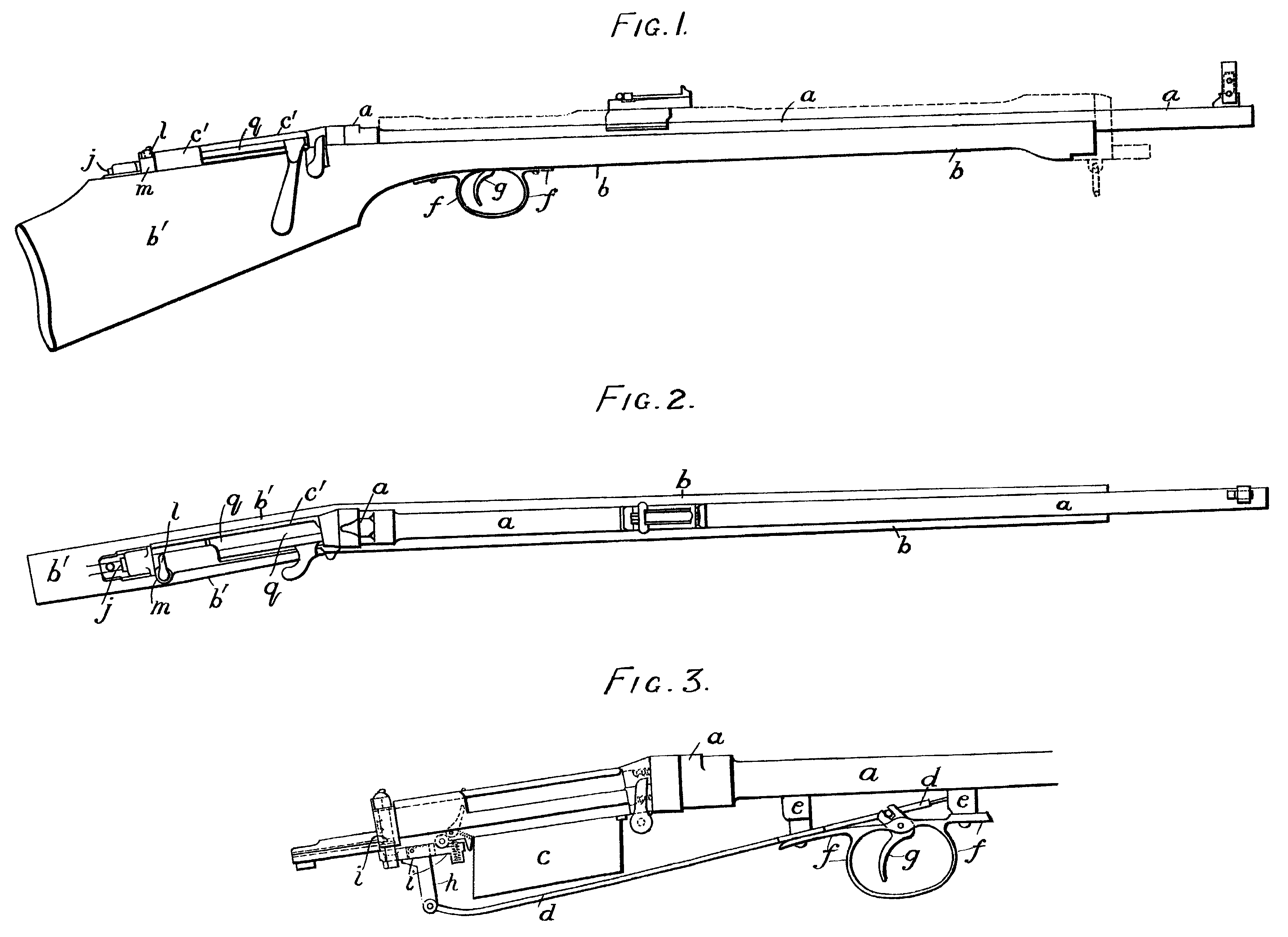
- Drawings from original patent
- Type: Bullpup bolt-action rifle
- Place of origin: United Kingdom

Production history
- Designed: 1901

Specifications
- Cartridge: .303 British
- Action: Bolt-action
- Feed system: 5-round internal magazine
- Sights: Iron sights

The Thorneycroft carbine was one of the earliest bullpup rifles, developed by an English gunsmith in 1901 as patent No. 14,622 of July 18, 1901. This bolt-action rifle featured a bullpup action in which the retracted bolt slid back through the stock nearly to the shooter's shoulder, maximising the space available in the body of the firearm. The rifle was chambered in the contemporary .303 British service cartridge, and held five rounds in an internal magazine.

The Thorneycroft was 7.5 in (190 mm) shorter and 10% lighter than the standard Lee–Enfield rifle used by the British military at the time. However, when tested at Hythe the firearm exhibited excessive recoil and poor ergonomics, and was not adopted for military service.

== See also ==
- List of bullpup firearms
- List of carbines

== Sources ==
- Rifles and Pistols by Jeremy Flack, Sunburst Military Series (1995) ISBN 978-1-85648-262-2
- Ferguson, Jonathan S. (2021). Thorneycroft to SA80: British Bullpup Firearms 1901–2020. Nashville, Tennessee: Headstamp Publishing. ISBN 978-1-7334246-2-2.
- The Lee-Enfield Story. Ian Skennerton. page 89.
