= Malyuk =

Ukrainian bullpup assault rifle

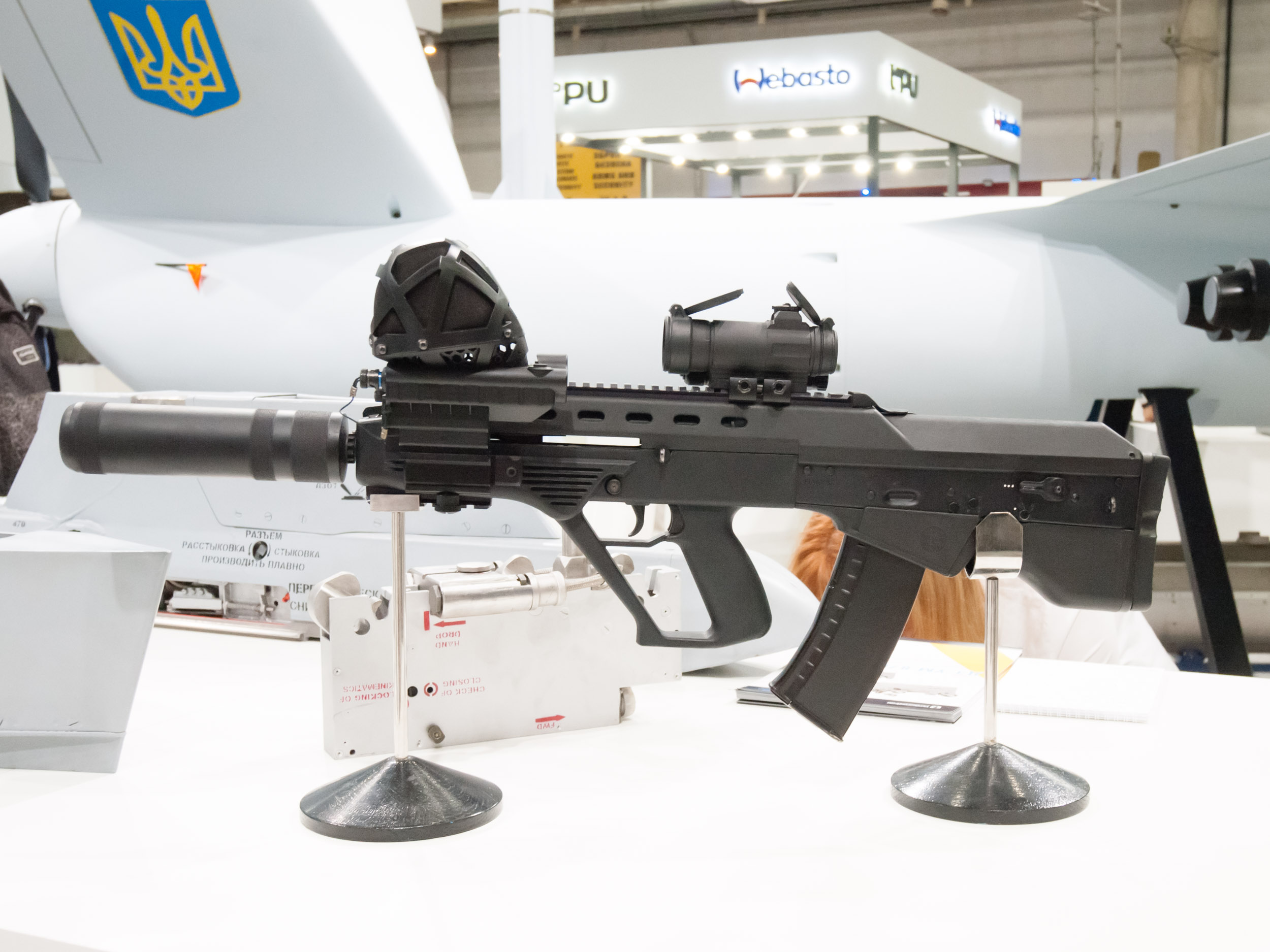
- Malyuk on display at the 2021 'Zbroya ta Bezpeka' military fair
- Type: Bullpup assault rifle
- Place of origin: Ukraine

Service history
- In service: 2017–present
- Wars: Russian invasion of Ukraine

Production history
- Designer: Interproinvest (IPI)
- Manufacturer: Krasyliv Assembly Manufacturing Plant
- Produced: 2015–present

Specifications
- Mass: 3.8 kg (8.38 lb)
- Length: 712 mm (28 in)
- Barrel length: 415 mm (16 in)
- Cartridge: 5.45×39mm 7.62×39mm 5.56×45mm NATO
- Rate of fire: 660 rounds/min
- Effective firing range: 500 m
- Feed system: 10/30/45 round detachable box magazine
- Sights: Iron sights and Picatinny rail, others as required by end user.

The Malyuk (Ukrainian: Малюк, lit. "Baby") or Vulcan is a bullpup assault rifle developed by the Ukrainian arms company Interproinvest (IPI).

== History ==
According to IPI Vice CEO Serhiy Luhovskyy, development of the Malyuk started in 2005. The development was based on a contract placed by the Security Service of Ukraine (SBU) with prototype rifles provided before inquiries were made by the Ukrainian Ministry of Defence in 2008. The first Malyuks were tested by SBU's Alpha Group from at least 2006.

In 2010, Ukrainian special forces used them during combat operations in the Donbas region. In February 2015, feedback was provided by then president Petro Poroshenko and the Department of State Security Guard.

Production was made in cooperation with the Electron Corporation as they can quickly produce the rifles with modern manufacturing equipment with the Krasyliv Assembly Manufacturing Plant.

The Malyuk debuted in 2015 at the Arms & Security Expo in Kyiv in 2015. The rifle was first seen in public outside of Ukraine at the International Defence Industry Fair in May 2015 at Istanbul, Turkey. and at the Azerbaijan International Defence Exhibition in September 2016 at Baku, Azerbaijan.

In July 2019, according to a Ministry of Defence spokesperson, the Malyuk rifle commenced production.

== Design ==
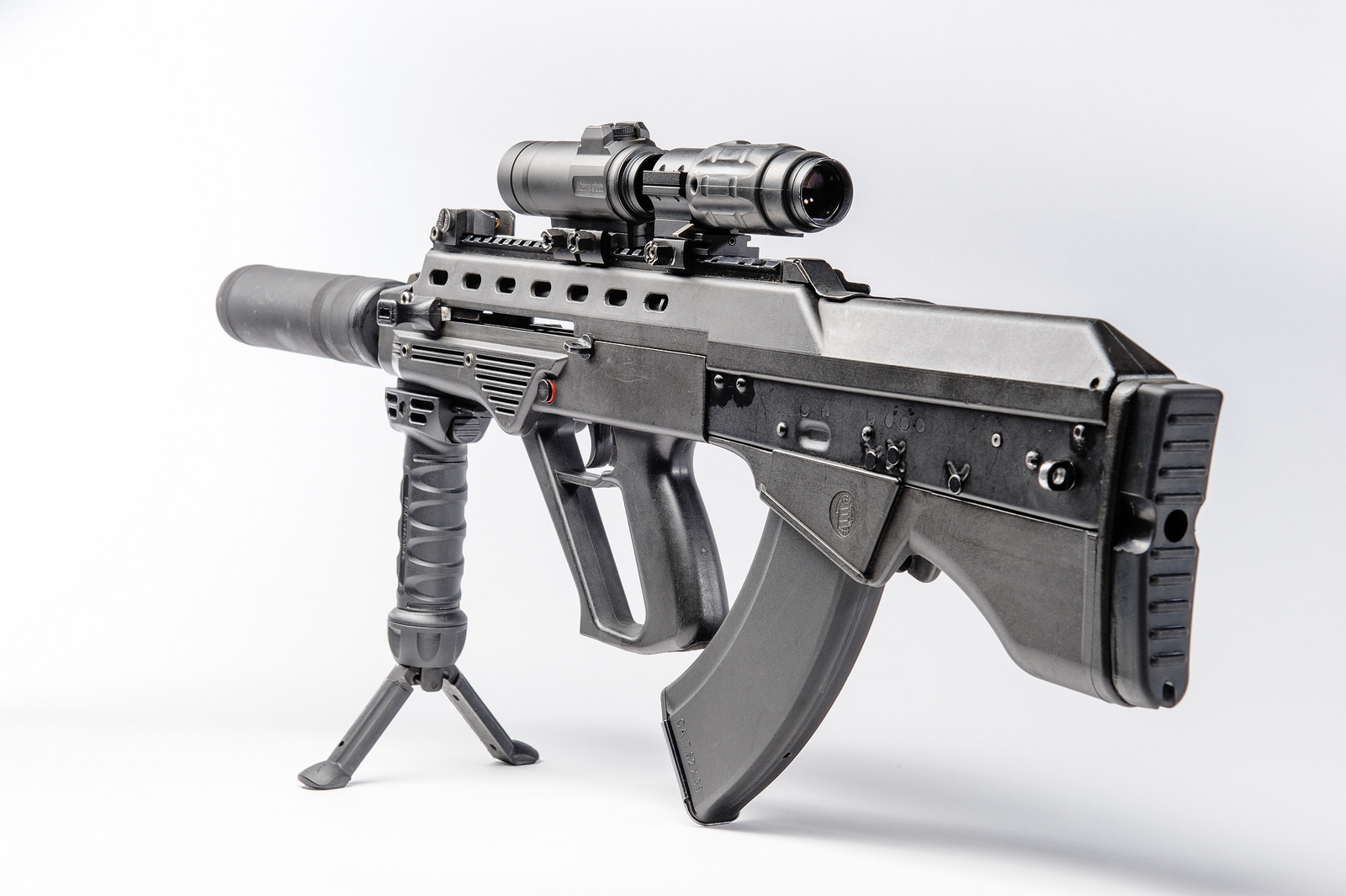
Malyuk with foregrip grip pod

The Malyuk is a further development of the Soviet Kalashnikov assault rifle, reconfigured into a bullpup layout. It is also based on the Vepr and the mistakes made with it. It is made from polymer materials and is chambered in 7.62×39mm, 5.45×39mm and 5.56×45mm NATO ammo and has an AK-74-type flash hider.

Malyuks chambered in 7.62×39mm and 5.45×39mm use AK-47/AKM/RPK and AK-74-based magazines while those chambered in 5.56×45mm NATO use AK-100-based magazines.

It can be equipped with an IPI-made suppressor as required. It weighs 3.8 kilograms and has a total length of 712 mm and barrel length of 415 millimetres (16.3 in). The Malyuk is cooled by air convection, which allows the rifle to have a longer barrel life.

The rifle's effective firing range is 500 m at a rate of 660 rounds per minute. The magazine release button is located next to the trigger. As the magazine well is specifically designed to facilitate better loading, it allows the magazine to drop by itself.

The magazine is inserted tilted backward and rolled forward. To solve the problem of excessive gas emissions, a deflector shield is placed over the ejection port. This allows spent cartridge cases to fall alternatively between 45 degrees or downward while reduced gas is sent to the receiver. Recoil is reduced by 50% and the design allows the user to fire the rifle, unload and load the magazine with one hand.

The Malyuk can either retain the AKM-based selective fire or an ambidextrous low-profile two-position selector for semi and full auto fire. The upper receiver has a full-length Picatinny rail with 3 short Picatinny rails on the handguard. Left or right-handed shooters can easily use the Malyuk as it is ambidextrous.

The Malyuk can be equipped with a RSP2W Shoot Corner for the user to fire it from around a corner. It is possible to mount an underbarrel grenade launcher.

== Variants ==
A commercial version of the Malyuk was developed at the Krasyliv Assembly Manufacturing Plant in cooperation with Electron Corporation.

- Malyuk K-01/02 – Semi-automatic civilian variant. The K-01 variant is chambered in 7.62x39 and the K-02 variant is chambered in 5.56×45
- Shepit – Meaning "whisper" in Ukrainian; Malyuk built with a long barrel, bipod, and suppressor
- Riff – Man-portable anti-drone weapon powered by a 100-watt portable battery

== Deployment ==
=== Ukraine ===
The Malyuk has been used by Ukrainian special forces since 2017, sometimes referring it to the Vulcan (Ukrainian: Вулкан) rifle

=== International ===
The weapon has been demonstrated in Indonesia and Sri Lanka for potential contracts.

== Users ==
- Indonesia: Used by Korpasgat, chambered in 7.62×39 mm.
- Ukraine: Used by the following:
  - Ukrainian Army
  - Ukrainian Marine Corps
  - Ukrainian Air Assault Forces
  - National Guard of Ukraine
  - Special forces of Ukraine
  - Ukrainian Territorial Defense Forces
  - Rapid Operational Response Unit
  - Military Police (Ukraine)
  - Main Directorate of Intelligence (Ukraine)

== Incidents ==
On February 27, 2022, an alleged saboteur was arrested in Odesa by the State Border Guard Service and the National Police of Ukraine in a joint operation. Among the items confiscated included a loaded Malyuk rifle with a Makarov PM, an RPG-22 and two T-62M anti-tank mines.
