= KH-2002 =

Iranian bullpup assault rifle

KH-2002 Khaybar
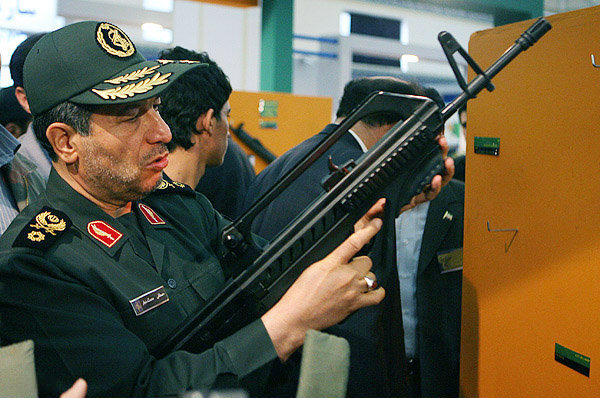
- The KH-2002 (2009 Sama model)
- Type: Bullpup assault rifle
- Place of origin: Iran

Service history
- In service: 2004–present
- Used by: Islamic Republic of Iran Army in limited numbers (Primary User); See Users for more details

Production history
- Designed: 2001
- Manufacturer: Defense Industries Organization
- Produced: 2003–2012
- Variants: See Versions

Specifications
- Mass: 3.7kg (with long barrel and empty 30-round magazine)
- Length: 780 mm, 730 mm, 680 mm (Assault Rifle, Carbine, DMR)
- Cartridge: 5.56×45mm NATO
- Caliber: 5.56mm
- Action: Gas-operated, rotating bolt
- Rate of fire: 800 to 850 round/min, cyclic
- Muzzle velocity: 900 to 950 m/s
- Effective firing range: 450 m
- Feed system: Various STANAG Magazines
- Sights: Iron sights Various scopes/sights can be attached on the picatinny rail via carry handle. Two picatinny rails on both sides of upper receiver (Sama model only)

The KH-2002 Khaybar (Persian: خیبر Khayber) is an Iranian-designed assault rifle, derived from the DIO S 5.56 assault rifle (an unlicensed clone of the Chinese Norinco CQ, which in turn is an unlicensed copy of the American M16) and further developed by Iran's Defense Industries Organization (DIO). It was designed in 2001 with samples produced in 2003 with the eventual production of the KH2002 commencing in 2004. It is similar in appearance to the QBZ-95 and the FAMAS.

Its improved version, released in 2009, was known as "Sama" (Persian: سما).

== History ==
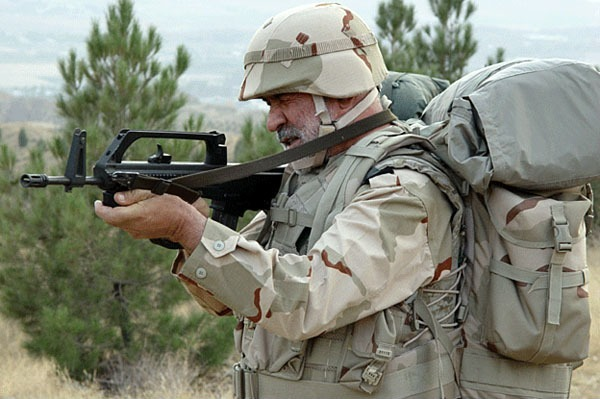
Brig. Gen. Ali Shushtari with the KH-2002.

In the early 2000s, Iran was testing prototypes of G3 battle rifles made under license for the Iranian military in bullpup configurations to test their feasibility. This was later dropped in favor of a similar weapon that is chambered in 5.56 NATO. The KH-2002 was planned, from 2006, to replace the G3s in the Iranian military.

According to a Global Security Studies report, it was observed that Venezuela received 18,000 KH-2002s sold to them by Iran in 2007. In the same year, an investigation was carried out in Uruguay in an attempt to bring KH-2002s into the country through Venezuela, which was a violation of UN embargo rules against Iran, according to reports in the Washington Times. According to the article, all 18,000 rifles and 15,000 rounds of Iranian-made 5.56mm NATO ammunition were confiscated.

In 2008, Iran had sent ten samples of the KH-2002 to Syria in order to compete for a potential contract with the Syrian Army against the AK-74M. Eight KH-2002s used in field tests jammed numerous times, leaving two of them in working condition.

It has been suggested that production of the KH-2002 was discontinued in 2012 after DIO was unable to find customers willing to buy the assault rifle.

== Design ==
The KH-2002 features a four-position fire selector lever which is situated toward the rear of the left side butt-stock behind magazine housing with the M16-type magazine release button on the right side of the magazine housing. The weapon is not entirely ambidextrous since the ejection port is located on the right side of the rifle. It uses the STANAG magazine and is typically fitted with 20- or 30-round magazines.

The selector offers semi-automatic, fully automatic and three-round burst options, with the safety selection in the forward position. It operates as a gas operated, rotating bolt-type rifle. The KH-2002 can be outfitted with an AK-type bayonet.

The DIO promotes the KH-2002 as a "low-recoil, highly accurate, lightweight" weapon, with "modular construction for easy maintenance" and a rotating bolt locking mechanism, presumably designed to facilitate ambidextrous firing, protected under a carrying handle that contains the rear sight. The carrying handle can also be used to mount optical or night sights.

Its charging handle is located on top of the receiver.

The weight of the KH-2002 with the long barrel and unloaded is given as 3.7 kg. The weapon can also be fitted with an optional bipod and a bayonet. Field stripping the rifle is most likely based on the M16.

The Sama-type rifle has improvements made over initial production models such as having a longer carry handle to accommodate longer optics or scopes when it was released in 2009. Other improvements include a foregrip extension below the barrel to better handle the rifle, two Picatinny rails on the receiver were included and the bolt carrier design changed to fit the ejection port.

According to an October 2013 report by SIPRI, it is suggested that China may have provided technical assistance to Iranian engineers in designing the rifle.

== Versions ==
The versions of the weapon consists of the following:

- 2002 Final Prototype: Standard barrel based on the M16A1.
- 2006 Production Model: Has a short barrel, short carry handle and no front sight.
- 2009 Improved Model (Sama): The last improvement model for the weapon. It introduces a modular design, using picatinny rails on the handguard (possibly also below the handguard, allowing the user to install more attachments.

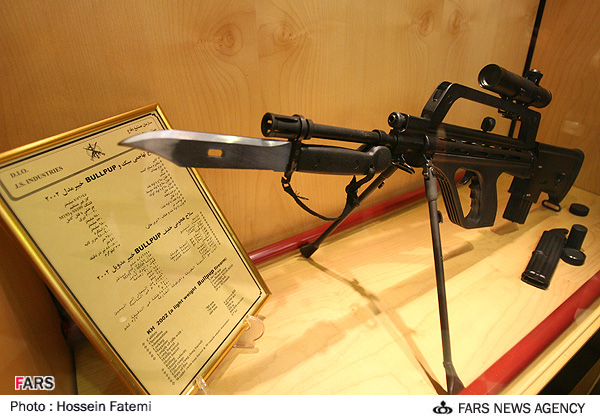
The 2006 model of the weapon equipped with a bayonet, a scope and a bipod, shown at a DIO tour.

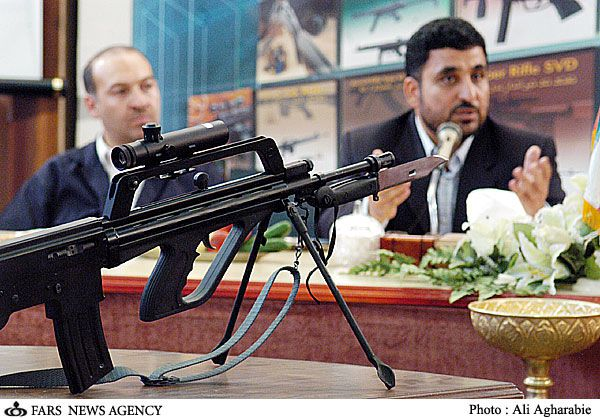
Another image of the right side view of the weapon, showing the same 2006 model.

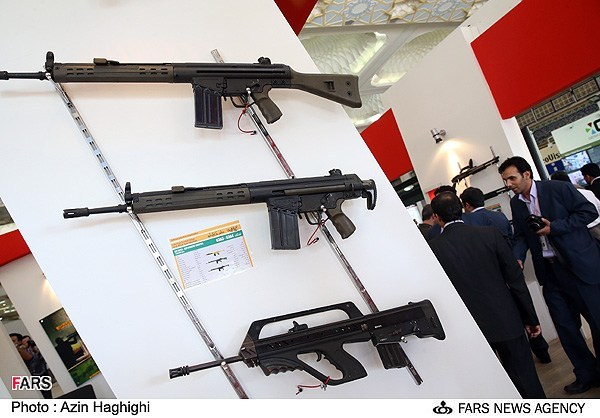
The KH-2002 (Sama) below two Iranian copies of the H&K G3 shown at IPAS 2013 Police Equipment Exhibition.

== Users ==
=== Current operators ===
- Iran: Used in limited numbers.

=== Failed contracts ===
- Syria: DIO competed with the KH-2002 against the AK-74M, which failed due to numerous jamming incidents.
- Uruguay: A smuggling attempt was made by CAVIM and MODLEX (Ministry of Defence & Armed Forces Logistics of the Islamic Republic of Iran) officials in a bid to supply the Uruguayan military with new assault rifles to secure a potential contract, which failed.
