= STK 40 GL =

- Type: Grenade launcher
- Place of origin: Singapore

Service history
- Used by: See Users

Production history
- Designer: Chartered Industries of Singapore
- Designed: 1980s
- Manufacturer: Chartered Industries of Singapore (former); ST Kinetics (former); ST Engineering

Specifications
- Mass: 2.05 kg (4.52 lb) with stock
- Length: 655 mm (25.8 in) with stock
- Barrel length: 305 mm (12.0 in)
- Cartridge: 40x46mm grenade
- Action: Break-action, single action
- Muzzle velocity: 76 m/s (249 ft/s)
- Effective firing range: Sights graduated from 100 to 400 m
- Feed system: Breech-loaded, single-shot
- Sights: Folding leaf sight

The STK 40 GL, formerly the CIS 40 GL (Note: Using the Wayback machine on this CIS 40 GL page indicates that the CIS 40 AGL name was used until 2016, when it changed to the STK 40 AGL name as seen here.) is a 40 mm grenade launcher, developed in the late 1980s and produced by the Singaporean defense firm Chartered Industries of Singapore (currently ST Engineering). The launcher is employed primarily by the Singapore Armed Forces and the police and security forces of several other countries.

== Design ==
According to ST Kinetics Senior Engineer Felix Tsai, the STK 40 GL can be configured to be used with a buttstock or attached underneath assault rifles like the SAR 21, the M16 rifle and HK series.

== Users ==
- Czech Republic: 601st Special Forces Group uses it on Samopal vz. 58s.
- Italy: Made under license by Luigi Franchi S.p.A. as the Franchi GLF-40.
- Papua New Guinea: Used by the Royal Papua New Guinea Constabulary.
- Poland
- Peru: Used during Cenepa war 1995.

=== Non-state actors ===
- Secretly acquired by Tamil Tigers.

== Bibliography ==
- Wozniak, Ryszard (2001). "p. 60". Encyklopedia najnowszej broni palnej - tom 2 G-Ł (in Polish). Warsaw, Poland: Bellona. ISBN 83-11-09310-5.
