= SAR 21 =

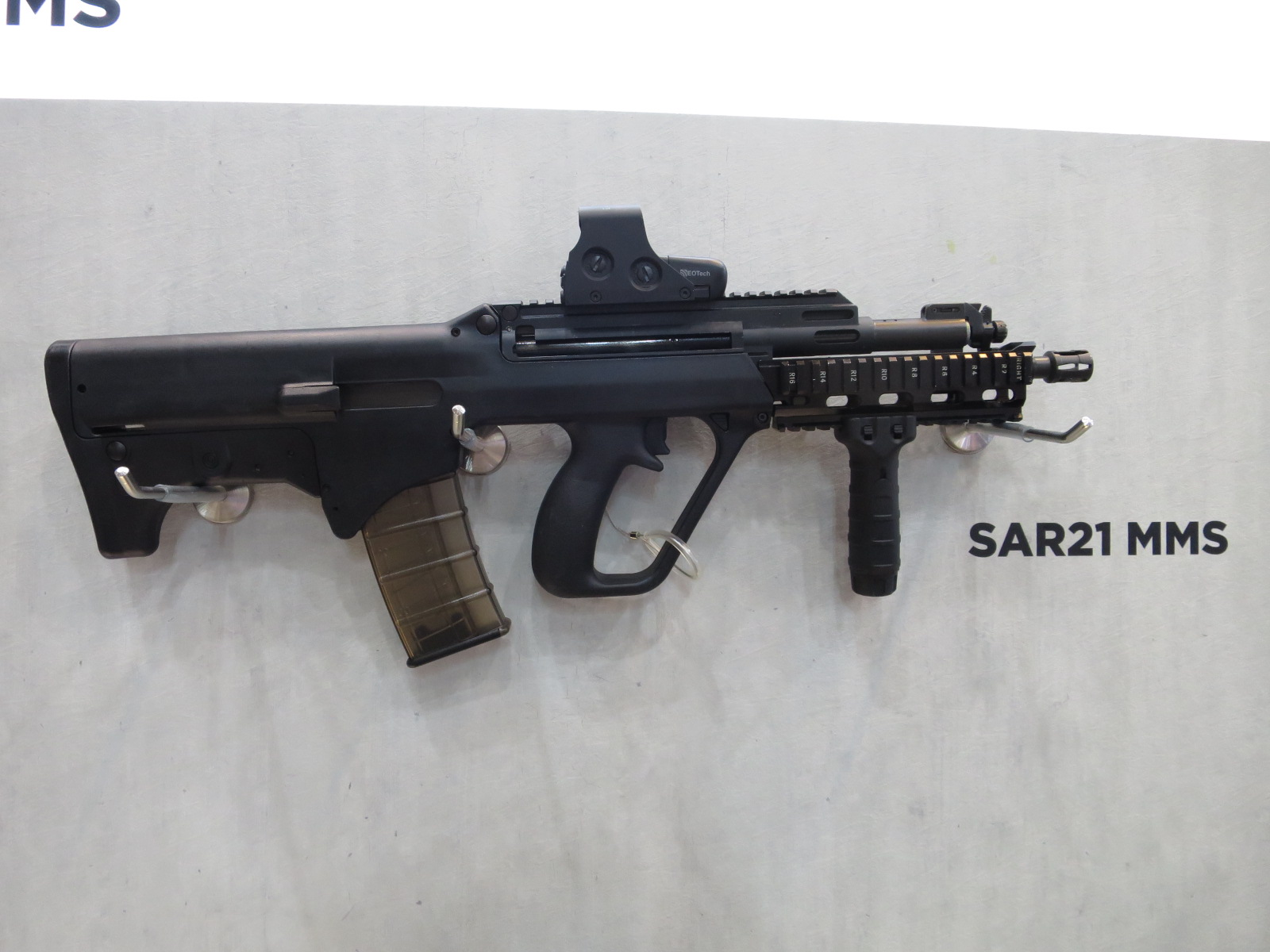
- SAR 21 MMS, right side view.
- Type: Bullpup assault rifle
- Place of origin: Singapore

Service history
- In service: 1999–present
- Used by: See Users

Production history
- Designer: Tuck Wah Chee and Felix Tsai of Chartered Industries of Singapore/ST Kinetics
- Designed: 1996
- Manufacturer: • CIS: 1999–2000 • ST Kinetics: 2000–present
- Produced: 1999–present
- Variants: See variants

Specifications
- Mass: • SAR 21: 4 kg (8.82 lb) • SAR 21 GL/M203: 5.3 kg (12 lb) • SAR 21 P-Rail: 3.6 kg (7.9 lb) • SAR 21 MMS: 3.5 kg (7.7 lb) • SAR 21 Light Weight Carbine 3 kg (6.6 lb)
- Length: 805 mm (31.7 in) (SAR 21, SAR 21 40 GL/M203, SAR 21 P-Rail); 680 mm (26.8 in) (SAR 21 MMS); 640 mm (25.2 in) (SAR 21 Light Weight Carbine)
- Barrel length: 508 mm (20.0 in)
- Cartridge: 5.56×45mm NATO
- Caliber: 5.56 mm (0.22 in)
- Barrels: Single barrel 1:12" and 1:7" twist options
- Action: Gas-operated, rotating bolt
- Rate of fire: 450–650 rounds/min
- Muzzle velocity: 970 m/s (3,182 ft/s) (M193); 945 m/s (3,100.4 ft/s) (SS109)
- Effective firing range: 460 m (M193); 800 m (SS109)
- Feed system: 30-round detachable plastic box magazine Export models: STANAG magazines
- Sights: 1.5x or 3x optical sight; back-up iron sights

The SAR 21 ("Singapore Assault Rifle - 21st Century") is a bullpup assault rifle designed and manufactured in Singapore, chambered for the 5.56x45mm cartridge. First revealed and subsequently adopted by the Singapore Armed Forces (SAF) as its standard service weapon in 1999, it was designed and developed over a four-year period to replace the locally license-built M16S1 by the Ministry of Defence (MINDEF), Singapore Army and the former Chartered Industries of Singapore (CIS), presently ST Engineering Land Systems.

Many of its design features are directly intended to address the weaknesses of the M16S1 as encountered operationally by some infantrymen. The rifle is being sold for export use aside from domestic use. In the United States, it was marketed by ST Kinetics via its American subsidiary, VT Systems.

== History ==
Since the mid-80s, the SAF had an outstanding requirement to replace the M16S1, in use since 1973, in part due to licensing limitations that prevented Singapore from exporting the M16S1 or making new assault rifles based on it. In 1994, a proposal by the SAF was submitted to MINDEF for options to either procure new weapons (thought was given to purchase the M16A2) or to develop an indigenous rifle. On 19 November 2002, a patent was filed with the United States Patent and Trademark Office by Tuck Wah Chee and Felix Tsai with the patent number 6,481,144 B1.

MINDEF officials, after consultations with the SAF, decided against buying weapons off the shelf as it would require soldiers to adjust to the new weapon, choosing instead to develop a weapon, designed and made specifically for ease of use by conscript soldiers of the SAF, who are mostly of slighter physiques. Coupled with the rising costs of maintaining the M16S1s, this made it more justifiable to develop a low-maintenance weapon.

In 2009, criminal charges were filed against former Indian Ordnance Factory Board director Sudipta Ghosh for corruption, among the allegations were an improper partnership with STK over supplying Indian law enforcement with the SAR 21 Modular Mounting System. STK and several foreign firms involved were blacklisted by the Indian Defence Ministry.

On February 19, 2024, the Next Generation SAR (Singapore Assault Rifle) was unveiled by ST Engineering at the Singapore Airshow 2024 event.

== Design ==
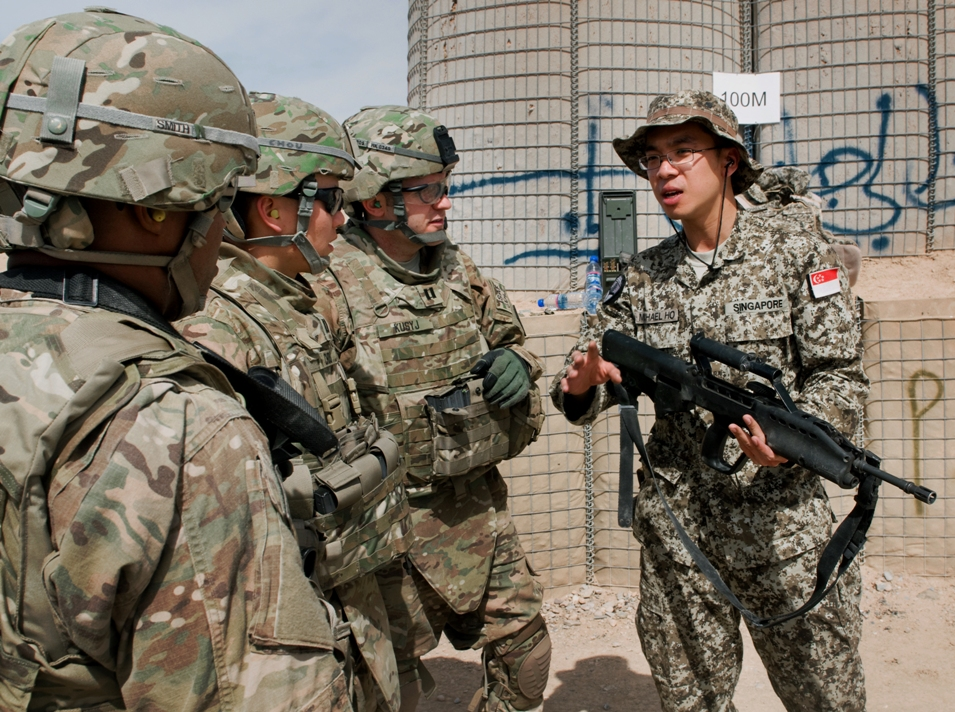
A Singaporean soldier gives an overview of the SAR-21 rifle to a group of US Army soldiers at Multinational Base Tarin Kowt.

The SAR 21's furniture is made of a rugged, high impact polymer, much of the manufacturing is done utilising CNC machines, with ultrasonic welding for the steel-reinforced receiver halves and the gun barrel being cold hammer forged. It has a long stroke gas system and a two-lug Stoner-style bolt, boasting high reliability. The translucent magazine allows precise assessment of its current ammo load.

The SAR 21 has a built-in Laser Aiming Device (powered by a single "AA-size" battery) which has a 5 position switch that emits a visible or infrared beam at high or low power. It can be set to a steady beam or a momentary beam that is triggered by a pressure switch activated with the user's left thumb. The rifle incorporates various patented safety features, such as a Kevlar cheek plate and a high pressure vent that protects the shooter in the event of a chamber explosion or catastrophic failure.

The integral 1.5x optical scope that is built into its carrying handle aids in target acquisition, particularly under low light conditions. The scope is factory-zeroed, and requires minimal further zeroing to suit different users, shortening non-training range time.

=== Design issues ===
Early users of the weapon in the Singapore Armed Forces experienced many problems due to their unfamiliarity with the bullpup design. Their criticisms (usually compared to the M16S1 rifles they were trained with) include:

- the awkward position of the fire selector (located at the butt, with the action), as opposed to the thumb selector on the M16S1
- the sluggish trigger pull compared with the crisp trigger of the M16S1
- the heavy weight of the weapon
- the increased muzzle blast, due to the muzzle being nearer to the user's ears
- being told by instructors that it is a "right-handed only" weapon and left-handed soldiers having to (and are still being taught to) fire with their right hand
- iron sights that chip off easily when weapon is dropped
- lack of internal illumination of the scope (the crosshairs in the scope are virtually invisible in the dark)

Some of these criticisms were addressed with design modifications to the later production models. New weapon handling procedures were also introduced.

- The magazine changing issue was solved with training soldiers to always hold the pistol grip with their master hand. The charging of the weapon and reloading of magazines are to be done by the non-master hand.
- The sluggish trigger pull was improved by using a stiff sliding plate in place of the flexible rod.
- The Steyr AUG styled iron sights were replaced with stockier, hardier ones.

The Kevlar plating on the left side of the weapon butt (where a right-handed user's face would typically be) is effective in protecting the user from any internal chamber explosion by directing the resulting force to the right. However, that resultant force would also seriously injure anyone on the right side of the weapon. In the case of a user firing from their left shoulder, this could cause severe injury to their face. As a result, all left-handed SAF soldiers are taught to fire from their right shoulder as a safety measure. The SAR 21 was designed with a small built-in brass deflector to eject spent bullet casings forward, thus reducing the chances of the spent casings hitting a left-handed user's face. The rifle is not completely ambidextrous but may be fired from the left shoulder.

=== Operation ===
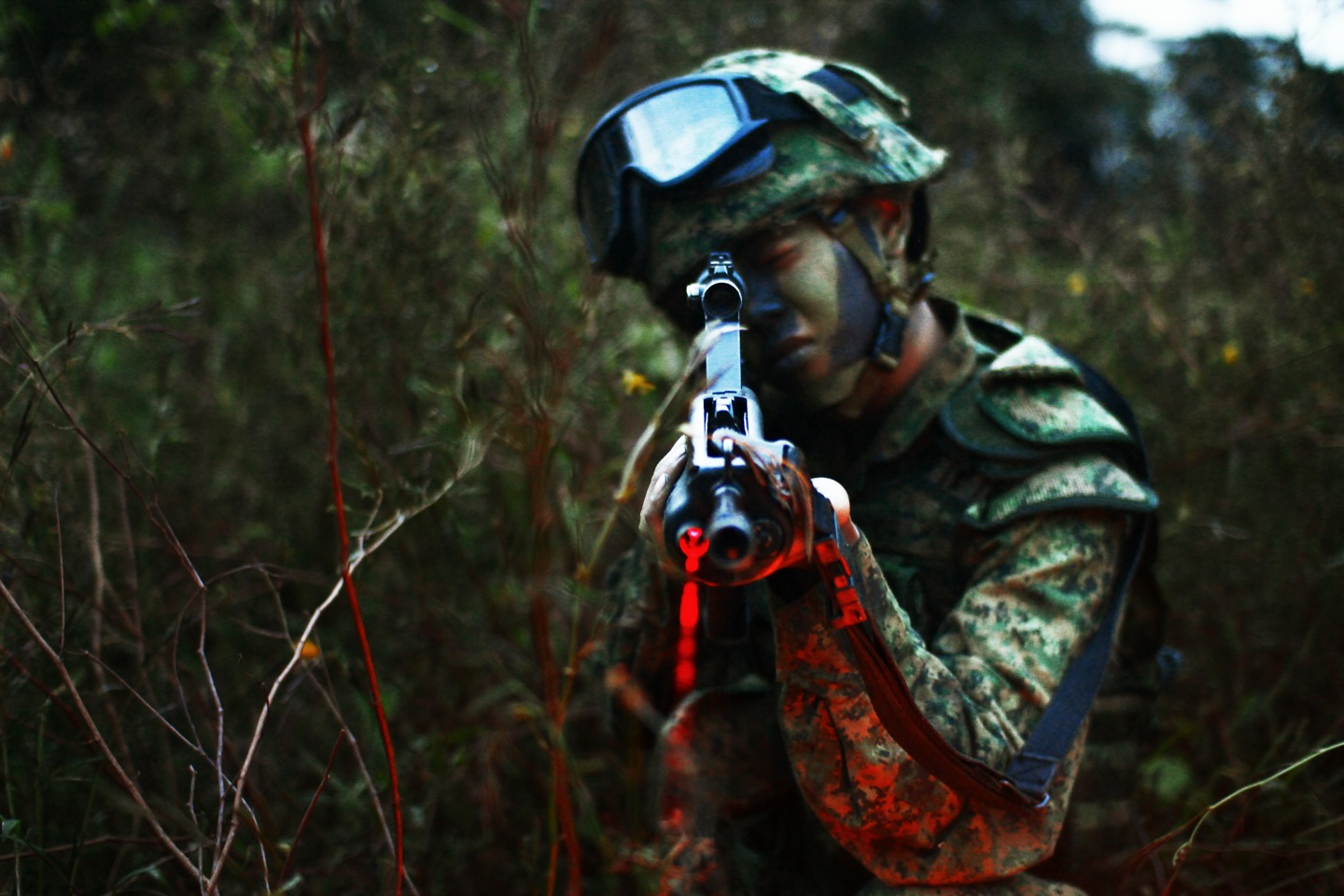
A Singaporean soldier takes aim with the SAR-21. Note the emitted red beam from the laser sight.

Like the M16 rifle, the bolt locks open on an empty magazine. When the magazine is exhausted, it is removed by depressing the catch lever. Clearing the weapon is accomplished by removing the magazine, pulling the charging handle to the rear, and observing the chamber. After loading a magazine into the housing, the weapon is made "ready" by cocking the weapon, and engaging the cross-bolt safety button forward of the trigger guard. The position of the fire selector button (SEMI or AUTO) on the stock may also be adjusted.

The on/off switch for the laser aiming device is located on the left handguard; when holding the weapon at ready, the left thumb rests naturally on it. With sluggish operation due to fouling, the gas regulator setting may be adjusted by turning it with a coin, screwdriver, or any other thin flat object. Alternatively, the gas regulator can be unlatched and turned by hand with aid of its knurled surface.

== Variants ==
SAR 21 Light Machine Gun (LMG)
Fitted with an open bolt, it has a heavy 513 mm (20.2 in) barrel with an integral folding bipod and foregrip.

SAR 21 Sharpshooter
A standard SAR 21 with a 3.0x optical sight. The sight picture is composed of luminous black paint, allowing easier target engagement at night without the use of the LAD.

SAR 21 Grenade Launcher (GL)
Attached with a CIS 40 GL or M203 grenade launcher. Several sub-variants/prototypes incorporate different targeting modules (or mounted on p-rails) for grenade target acquisition. Known sights to have been used include aiming quadrants, various optical sights and laser fire control systems.

SAR 21 Picatinny rail
Picatinny rail in place of its integral optical sight. The charging handle is moved to the side of the weapon and is interchangeable.

SAR 21 Modular Mounting System (MMS)
Has integral optical sight and LAD removed to allow a wide variety of add-on tactical accessories, such as vertical assault grips, tactical lights and reflex sights. Charging handle is moved to the left hand side of the weapon. Similar to P-rail model, variants consist of a standard and carbine-based barrels.

SAR 21 Lightweight Carbine
A lightweight SAR 21 variant was revealed during the Asian Defence Exhibition held in conjunction with 2006 Asian Aerospace. The variant boasts an ultra-short barrel, shorter handguards and a Picatinny rail

RCF module
The Round Corner Firing (RCF) module, similar in concept to the Israeli CornerShot, can be attached to any of the above SAR 21 variants for conducting operations in an urban environment.

SAR 21A
Prototype unveiled at the Singapore Air Show 2010, this updated variant boasts a sturdier thumb selector for ambidextrous control, an unloaded weight of 3.2 kg (7 lb 0.9 oz), a full built-in Picatinny rail along its length and a higher rate of firing at 900 RPM. In production as of 2012.

== Users ==
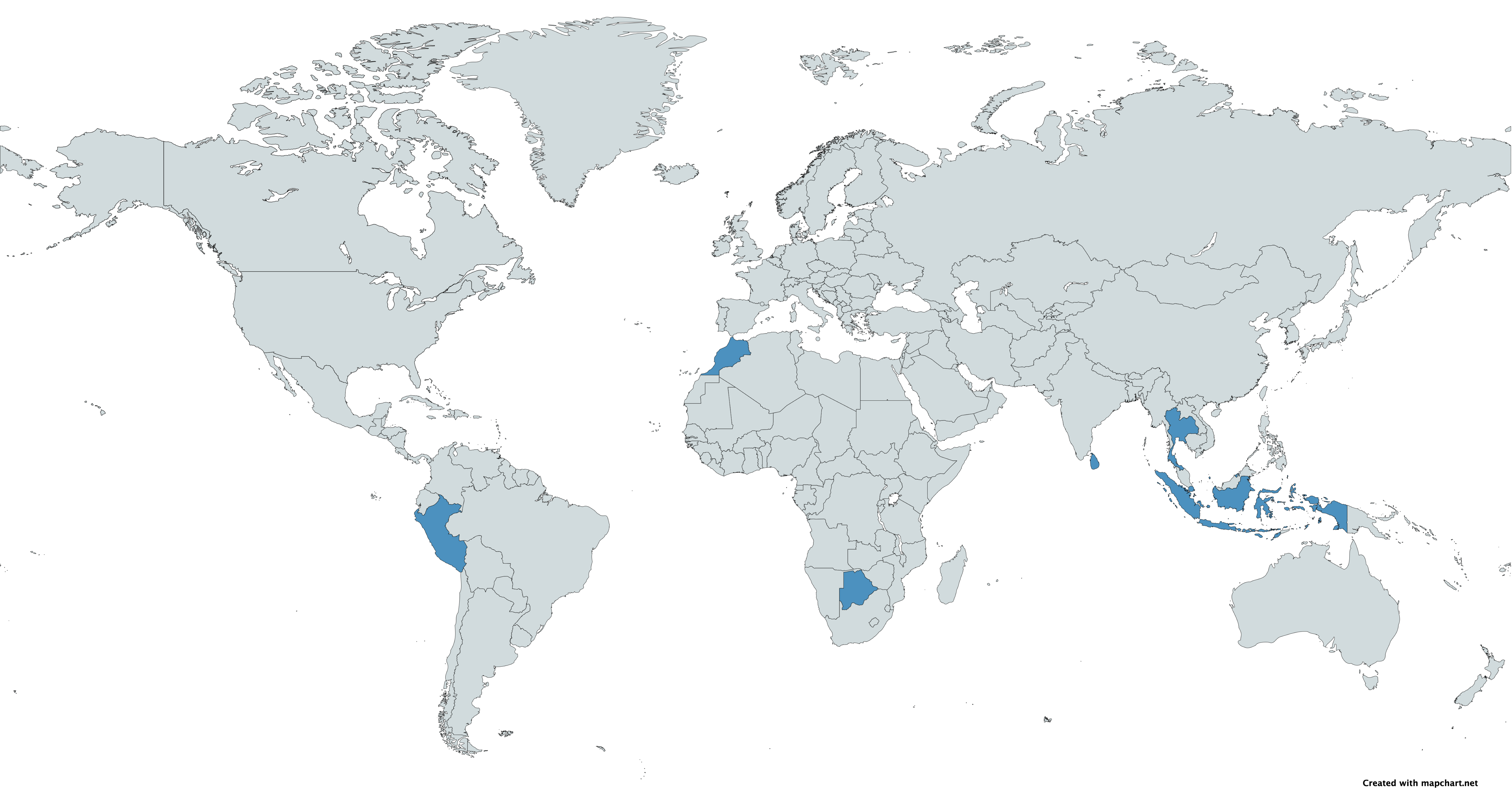
A map with SAR 21 users in blue

- Botswana: Replacing the FN FAL with the SAR 21 as of 2017.
- Brunei: Royal Brunei Armed Forces.
- Indonesia: Indonesian Air Force, used by Korps Pasukan Khas special forces unit.
- Morocco
- Peru: Special forces.
- Singapore: Singapore Armed Forces.
- Thailand: Special forces.
- Sri Lanka: Special forces.
