= Kazimierz Januszewski =

Polish footballer

Personal information
- Full name: Kazimierz Januszewski
- Date of birth: 4 March 1908
- Date of death: 18 September 1956 (aged 48)
- Place of death: Gdańsk, Poland
- Height: 1.78 m (5 ft 10 in)
- Position: Forward

Senior career*
Years	Team	Apps	(Gls)
1945–1947	Lechia Gdańsk	3	(2)
- * Club domestic league appearances and goals

Kazimierz Januszewski (4 March 1908 – 18 September 1956) was a Polish footballer who played as a forward. He played for Lechia Gdańsk during their early years, making a total of 12 appearances and scoring 12 goals in all competitions for the club.
