= Bullpup =

Type of firearm configuration

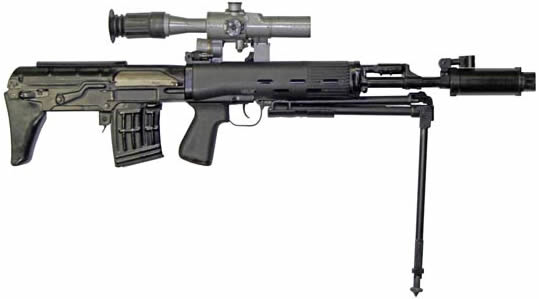
The OTs-03 SVU, a bullpup rifle with the grip and trigger located in front of the action

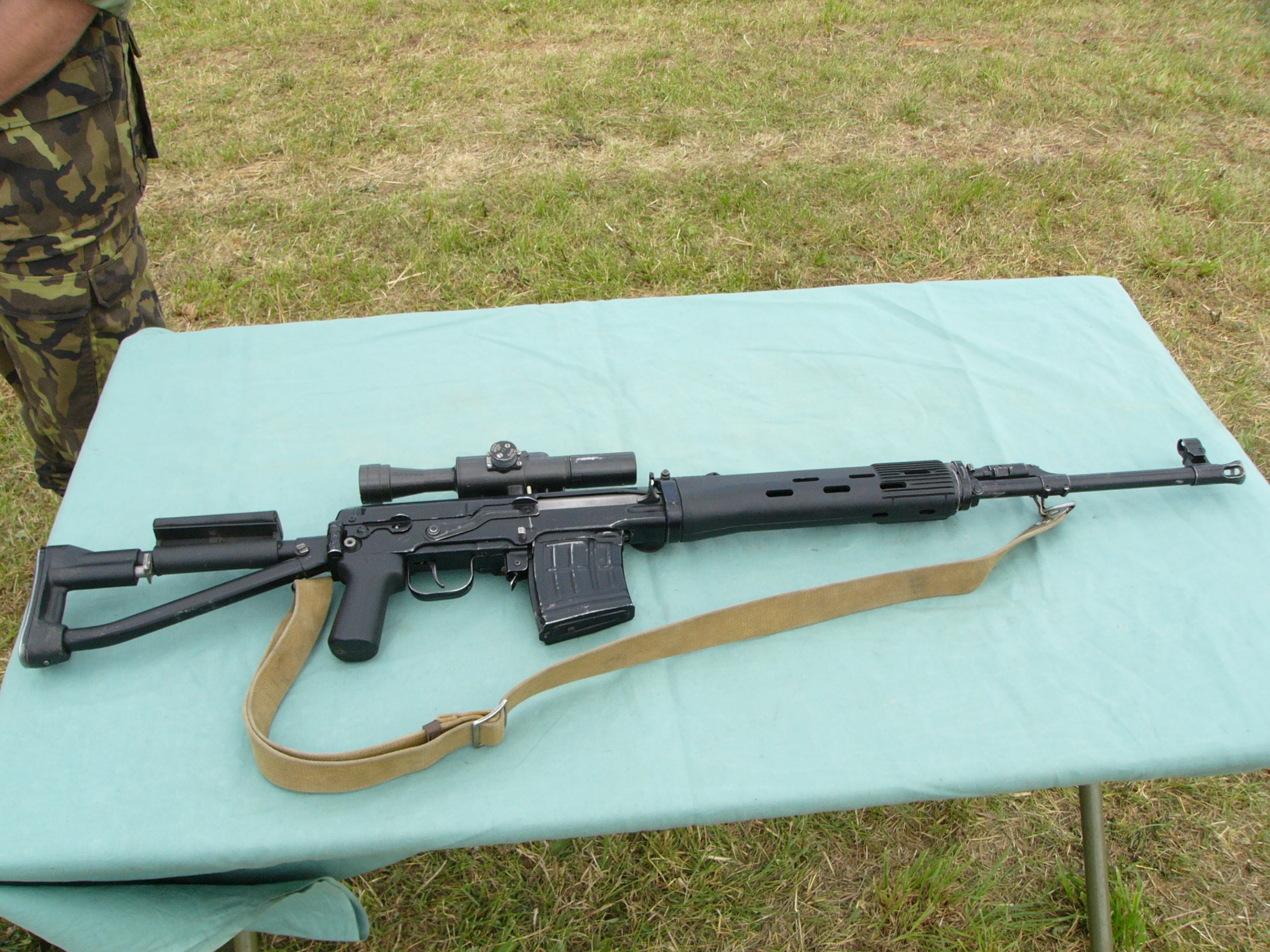
The SVDS, a conventionally configured rifle using the same action

A bullpup firearm is one with its firing grip located in front of the breech of the weapon, instead of behind it. This creates a weapon with a shorter overall length for a given barrel length, and one that is often lighter, more compact, concealable, and more maneuverable than a conventionally configured firearm. Where it is desirable for troops to be issued a more compact weapon, the use of a bullpup configuration allows for barrel length to be retained, thus preserving muzzle velocity, range, and ballistic effectiveness.

The bullpup concept was first tested militarily in 1901 with the British Thorneycroft carbine, but it was not until the Cold War that more successful designs and improvements led to wider adoption. In 1977, the Austrian Army became the first military force in the world to adopt a bullpup rifle, the Steyr AUG, as a principal combat weapon. Since then the militaries in many countries have followed suit with other bullpup designs, such as the Chinese QBZ-95, Israeli IWI Tavor, French FAMAS and British SA80.

== Etymology ==
The origin of term "bullpup" for this configuration has long been unclear. In 1957, the word was reported to denote a target pistol, particularly one with a fancy stock.

British firearm expert Jonathan Ferguson researched the origin of the term in 2019–2020. He found early references in 1930s firearm magazines implying that "bullpup" is derived from an analogy of such rifles to bulldog puppies (colloquially called "bullpups" in England during the late 19th and the early 20th century), which were considered "squat, ugly but still aggressive and powerful". The original meaning of the word to describe dogs has since fallen out of use.

== Description ==
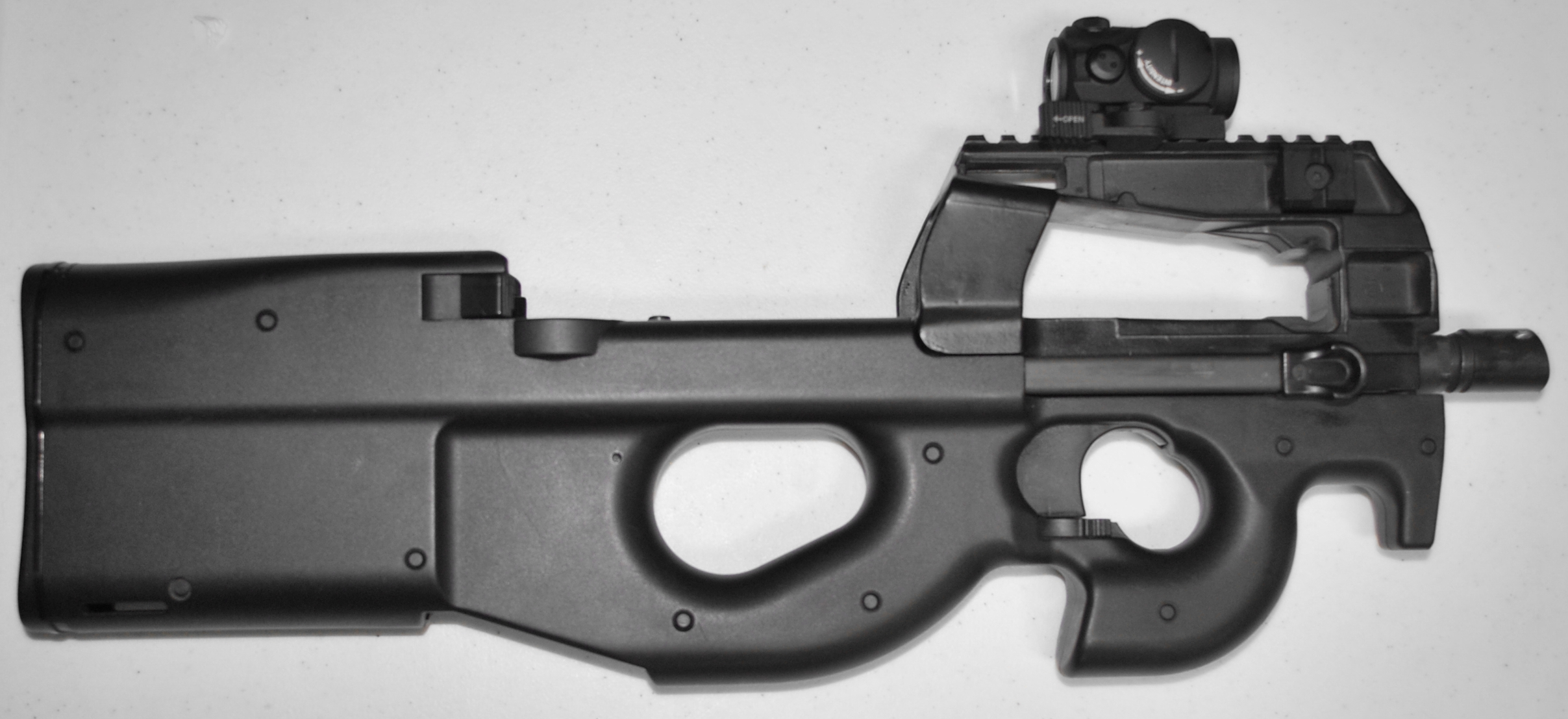
The FN P90 uses the bullpup layout in conjunction with a unique top-mounted feeding system, making it the most compact submachine gun with a fixed stock.

The bullpup design places the gun's action mechanism and magazine behind the trigger, and the receiver functionally serves as the buttstock with usually only a thin endplate, making the gun more of a "stockless" weapon from a pure technical sense. The magazine is also inserted behind the trigger group (technically it only needs the magazine's feeding slot to be located behind the trigger for the gun to be classified as a bullpup), but in some designs such as the Heckler & Koch G11, FN P90 and Neostead, the magazine can extend forward beyond the trigger.

=== Advantages ===
- The primary benefit of a bullpup weapon is that the weapon's overall length can be significantly decreased without reducing the barrel length. This allows a bullpup weapon to be more easily maneuvered and concealed than a conventional weapon with a similar barrel length, especially in tight spaces.
- In some designs, the shorter length of stock reduces the weight compared to a conventional rifle with the same action.
- The center of mass of a bullpup weapon is more posterior, thus closer to the shooter's core. This means less torque when moved around, making the handling kinematically more comfortable, especially when the shooter is running.
- Due to the shorter distance between the action and the butt plate, the recoil impulse is transmitted more directly into the shooter's shoulder, with less leverage to create muzzle rise.

=== Disadvantages ===
- When using a bullpup weapon, the user's face is much closer to the action. This can increase noise issues and cause irritation to the shooter's eye and nose from exhaust gas. Spent cartridge cases may be ejected directly into the face of left-handed shooters. It can be difficult for a right-handed shooter to "off-hand" the weapon. For weapons with reciprocating charging handles, there is also the risk of their charging handles striking left-handed users. The process of changing the ejection side varies in complexity depending on the weapon, but as a general rule it requires at least some disassembly and cannot be done "on the fly", such as when an unusual shooting position might call for the weapon to be used on the other shoulder. On some weapons, such as the SA80, changing the ejection side is simply not possible. As a result, bullpups often require unusual ejection mechanisms to allow easy ambidextrous operation. This is solved on some designs with ejection downward (FN P90, Kel-Tec RDB) or forward (FN F2000, Kel-Tec RFB).
- In case of a catastrophic failure, a bullpup weapon is more dangerous because both the barrel and the action are nearer to the shooter's head, neck and torso.
- When using iron sights, bullpup firearms typically have a shorter sight radius than conventional designs of the same barrel length, compromising accuracy.
- Bullpup weapons need a much longer trigger-sear linkage due to the trigger's forward position, so they tend to have stiffer, less precise triggers. Trigger pull characteristics are consequently a frequent criticism of bullpup weapons.
- Changing magazines is often less intuitive and ergonomic, and it is very difficult to perform a "drop free" change. This can be particularly problematic when the weapon is equipped with a sling, which attaches nearer to the magazine well in bullpup weapons and can physically interfere with magazine insertion.

== History ==
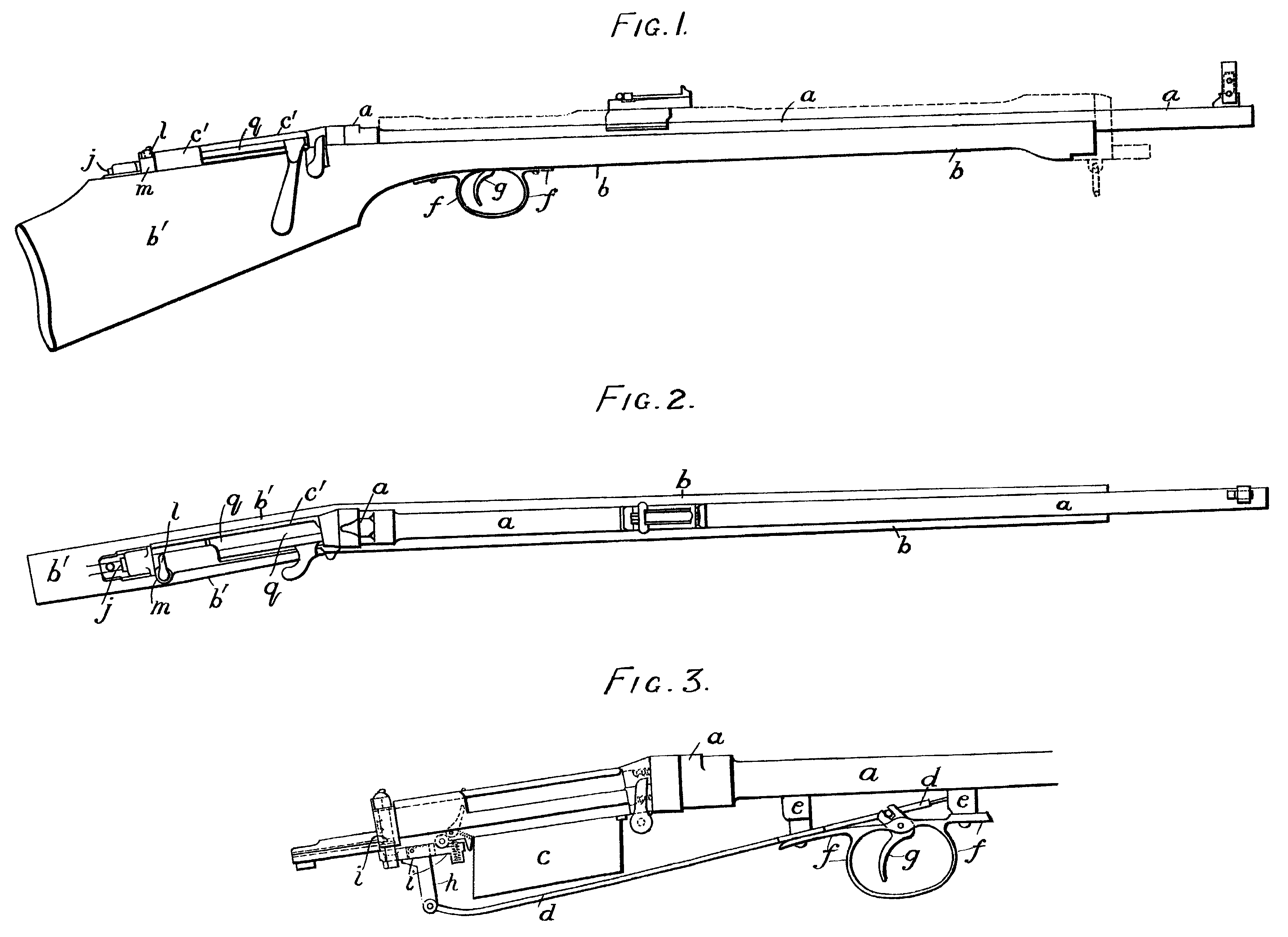
Thorneycroft carbine patent

The earliest bullpup firearm known is a heavy bench-rest target rifle made circa 1860 for Richard Potter by Riviere of London. It weighs more than 6 kg (13 lb 4 oz) and features an octagonal barrel of approximately 20 bore (0.60 in) in calibre, with two-groove Brunswick rifling. It is held in the collection of the British National Rifle Association. One of the earliest repeating bullpup designs was patented by William Joseph Curtis in 1866. The concept was later used in bolt-action rifles such as the Thorneycroft carbine of 1901, although the increased distance from hand grip to bolt handle meant the decreased length had to be weighed against the increased time required to fire. It was used in semi-automatic firearms in 1918 (6.5 mm French Faucon-Meunier semi-automatic rifle developed by Lt. Col. Armand-Frédéric Faucon), then in 1936 a bullpup machine pistol was patented by the Frenchman Henri Delacre. The first bullpup design used in combat was the PzB M.SS.41 anti-tank rifle during World War II. It was a Czech weapon used by the SS, produced under German occupation.

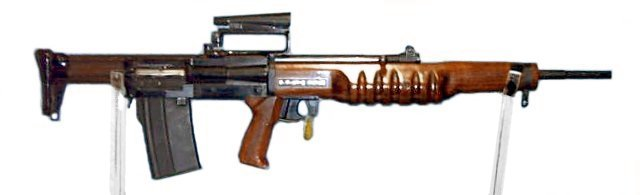
EM-2, an experimental British assault rifle from the 1950s.

After World War II, Western engineers drew inspiration from the German Sturmgewehr 44 assault rifle, which offered a compromise between bolt-action rifles and submachine guns. Among them was Kazimierz Januszewski (also known as Stefan Janson), a Polish engineer who had worked at the Polish national arsenal during the 1930s. After being mobilized during World War II he escaped German and Soviet forces and made his way to England, where he was a part of the "Polish design team" at Enfield Lock's Royal Small Arms Factory. The factory was run by lieutenant colonel Edward Kent-Lemon. As Januszewski was developing a new rifle, the "Ideal Calibre Board" was searching for a replacement for the .303 cartridge. The Board decided on an optimal 7 mm cartridge on which Januszewski and the two teams working at Enfield had to base their designs. One design team led by Stanley Thorpe produced a gas-powered rifle with a locking system based on the Sturmgewehr. The design used steel pressings which were difficult to obtain, and so was scrapped. The result of the Polish design team's efforts was the EM-2, which broke significant ground.

The EM-2 contained some similarities to the Soviet AK-47, although Januszewski had never seen the Soviet rifle. The first significant bullpup assault rifle came from the British programme to replace the service pistols, sub-machine guns, and rifles. In the two forms of the EM-1 and the EM-2, the new rifle concept was born as a result of the experience with small arms that was gained during the Second World War.

It was obvious that modern warfare would require the infantry to be armed with a light, selective fire weapon, with effective range much longer than that of a submachine gun, but shorter than that of conventional semi-automatic or bolt-action rifles. The bullpup design was deemed necessary to retain the accuracy at range while reducing overall length. The EM-2 was adopted by the UK in 1951 as the world's first (limited) service bullpup rifle, but was promptly displaced by the adoption of the 7.62×51mm NATO (0.308 in) cartridge, to which the EM-2 was not easily adapted. The decision was rescinded and a variant of the more conventional FN FAL was adopted in its place.

A 7.62×39mm M43 calibre experimental assault rifle was developed by German A. Korobov in the Soviet Union around 1945, and a further development, the TKB-408 was entered for the 1946–47 assault rifle trials by the Soviet Army, although it was rejected in favour of the more conventional AK-47. The United States briefly experimented in the same year with the integrally-scoped Model 45A bullpup, which never progressed beyond the prototype; John Garand designed the T31 bullpup, which was abandoned after his retirement in 1953.

After these failures of the bullpup design to achieve widespread service, the concept continued to be explored (for example: a second Korobov bullpup, the TKB-022PM).

=== Adoption ===
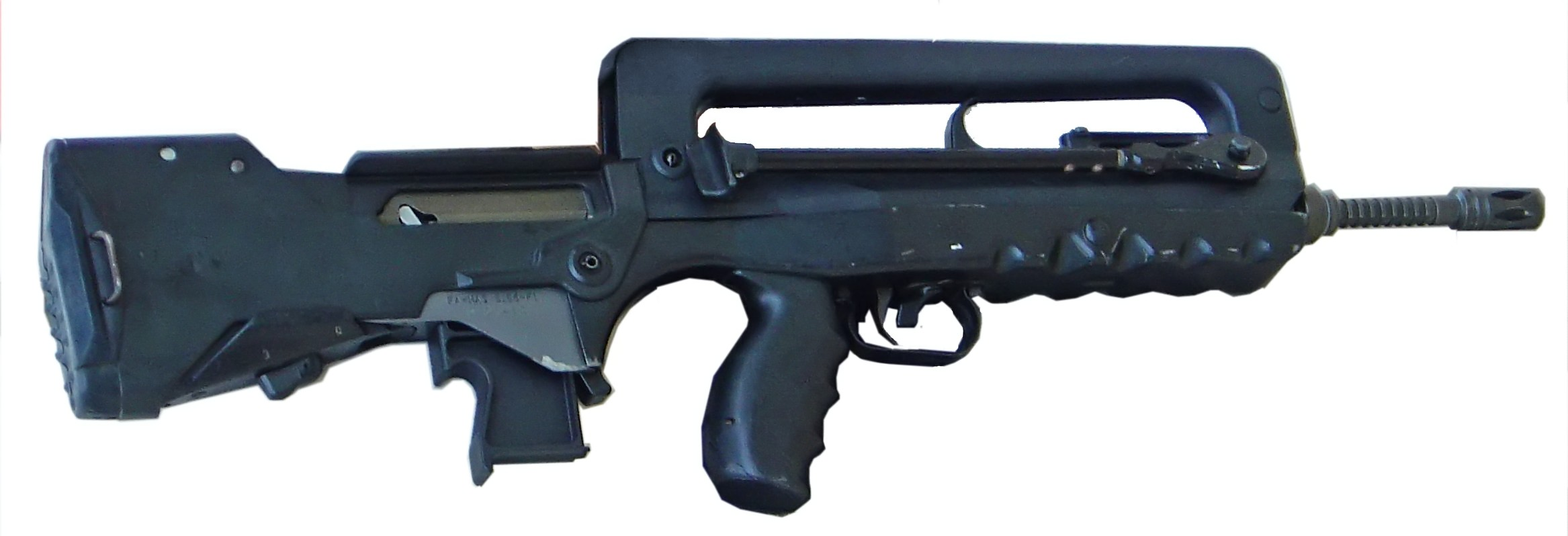
FAMAS F1 rifle

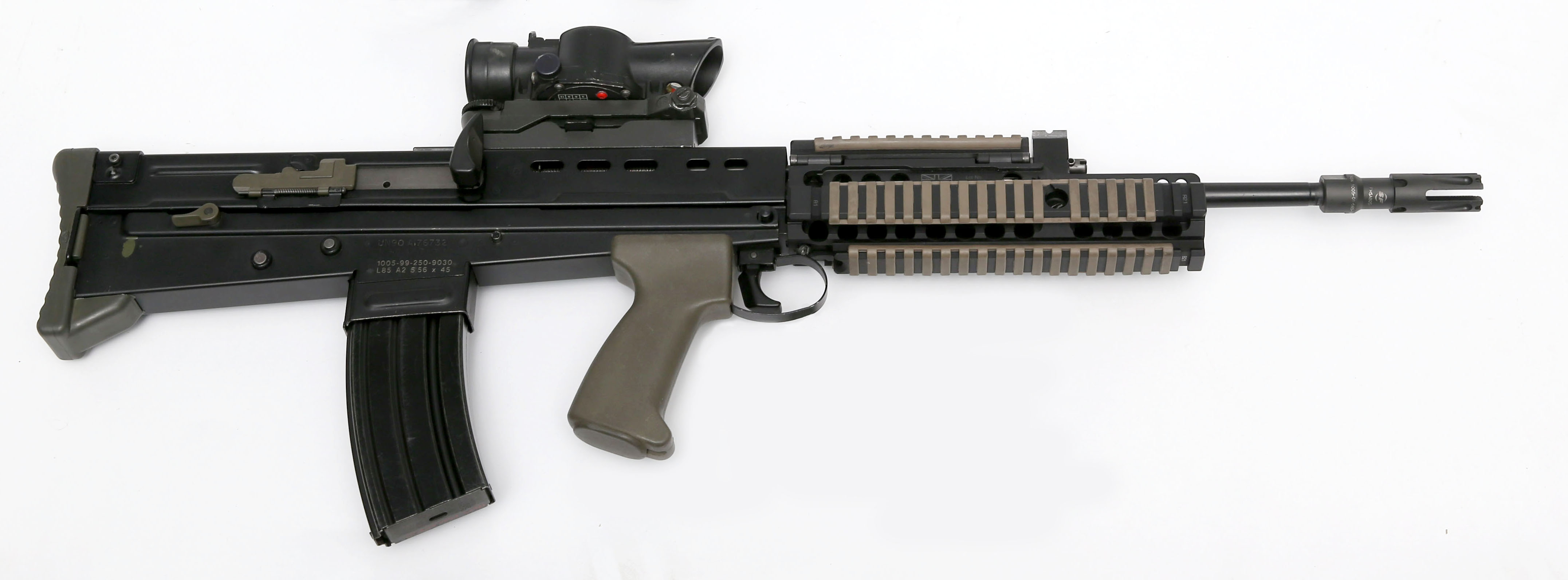
The L85A2 rifle, variant of the SA80 series of weapons

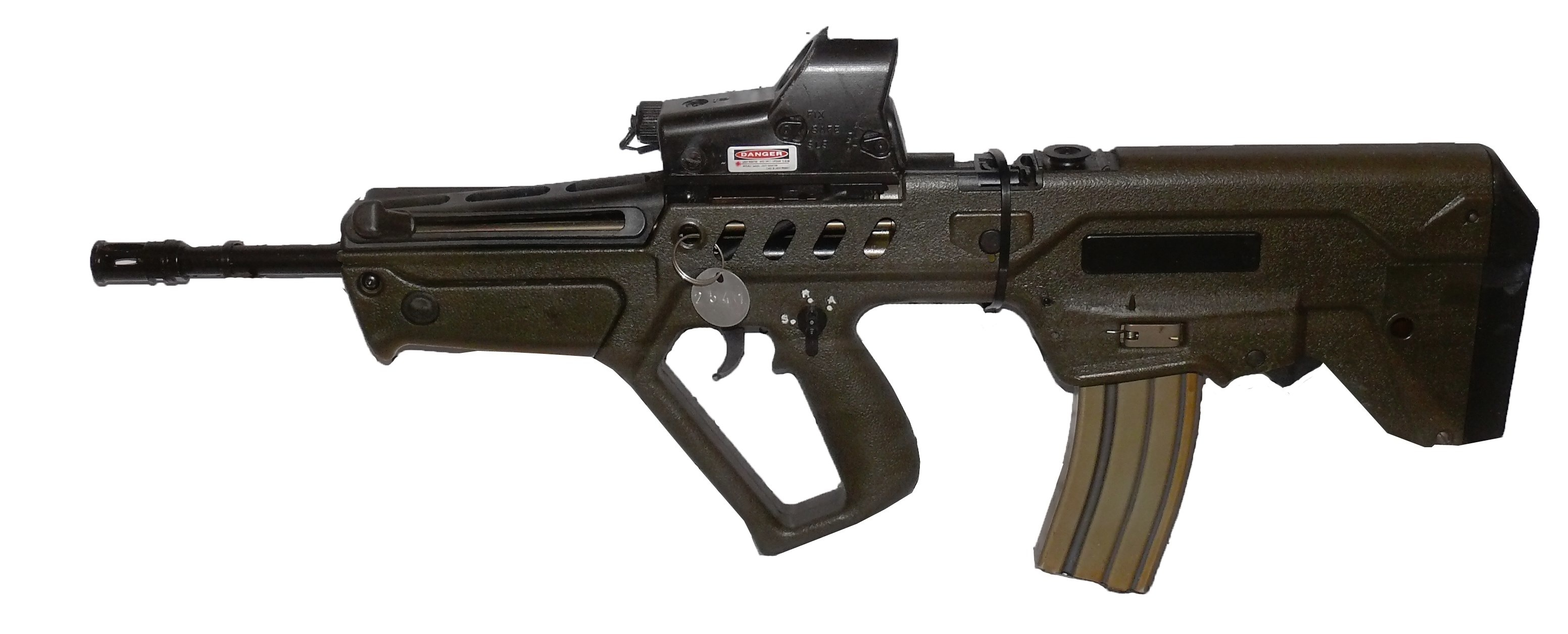
IWI Tavor TAR-21

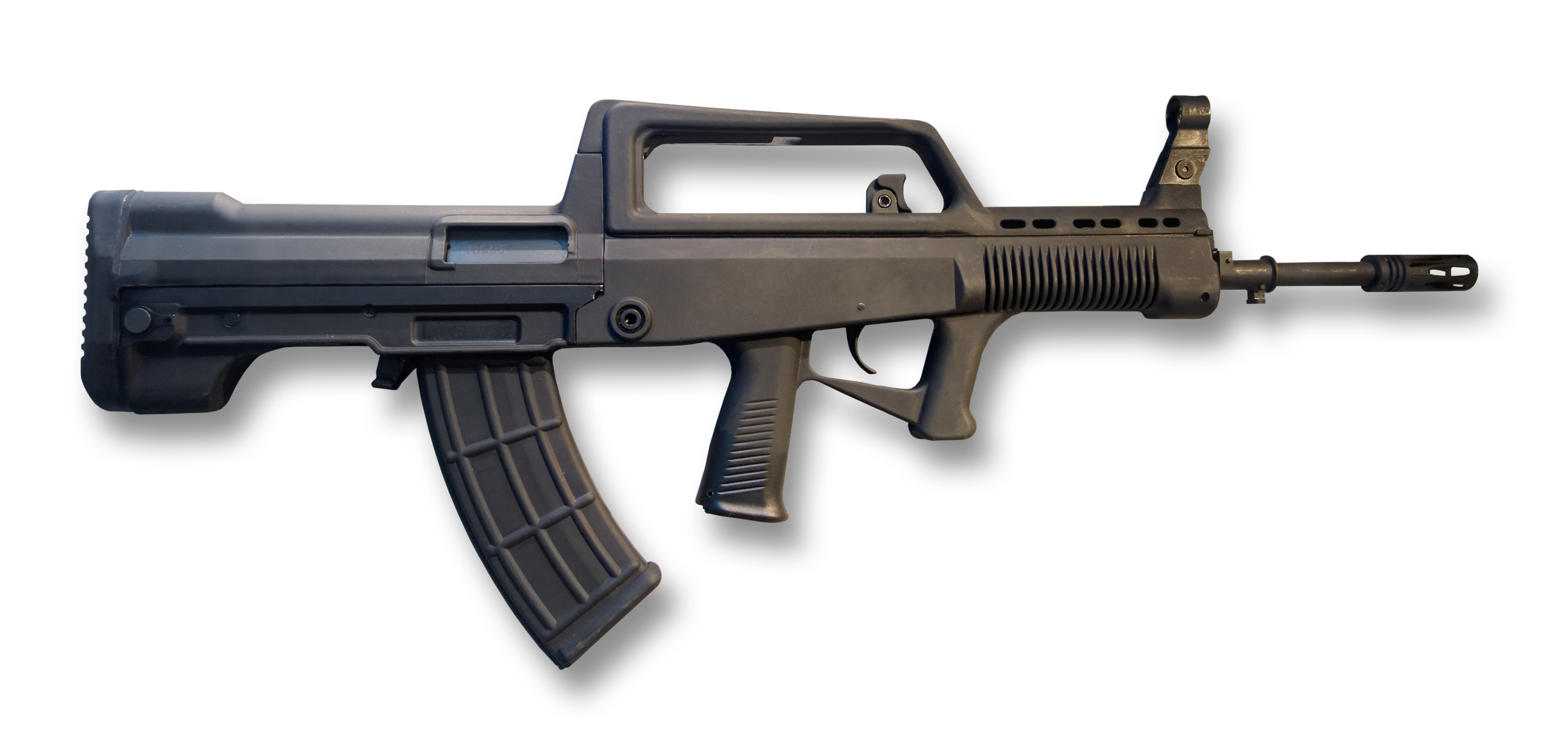
The QBZ-95 is one of the most-produced firearms in the world with approximately 3 million weapons made.

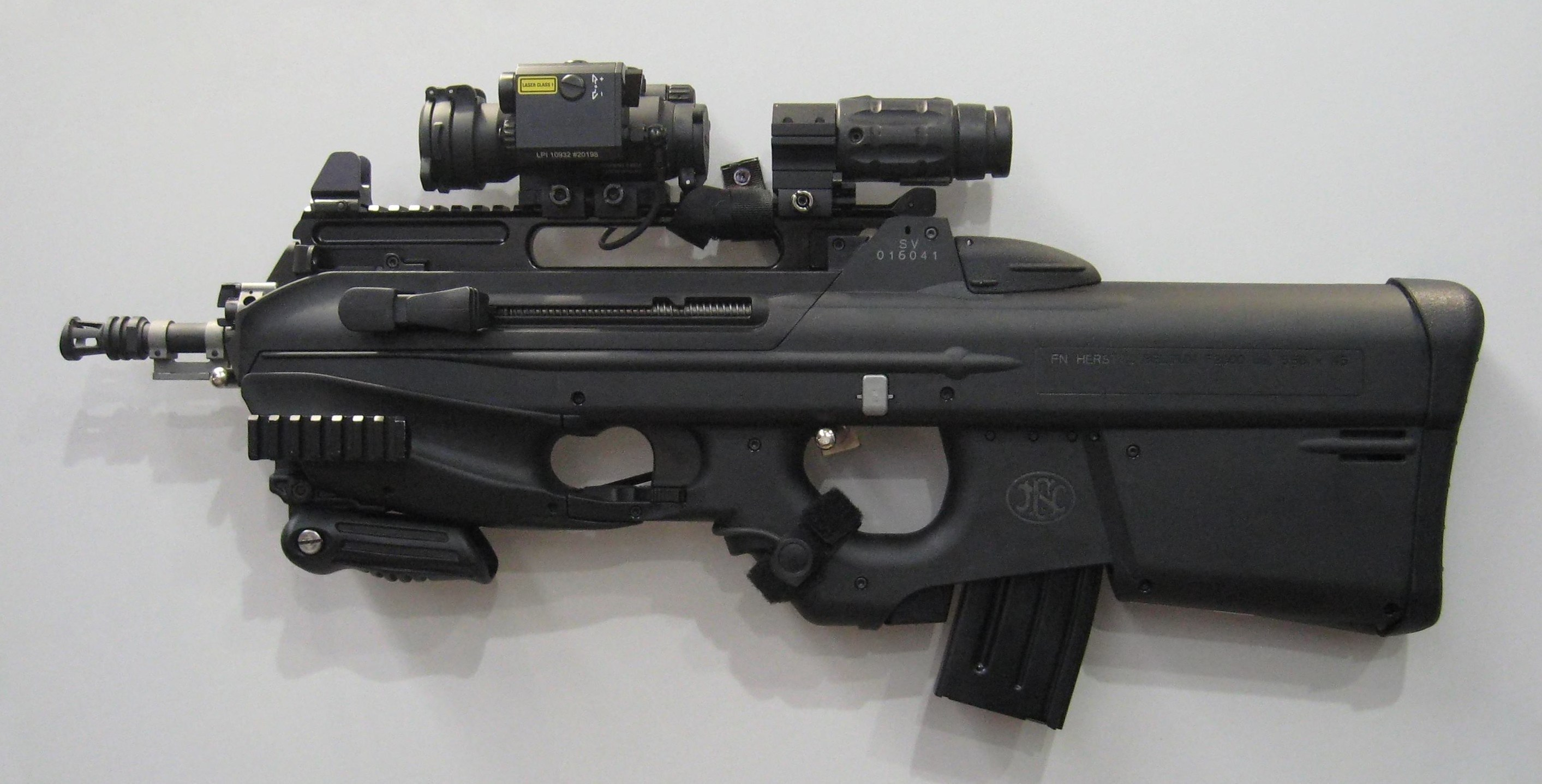
FN F2000

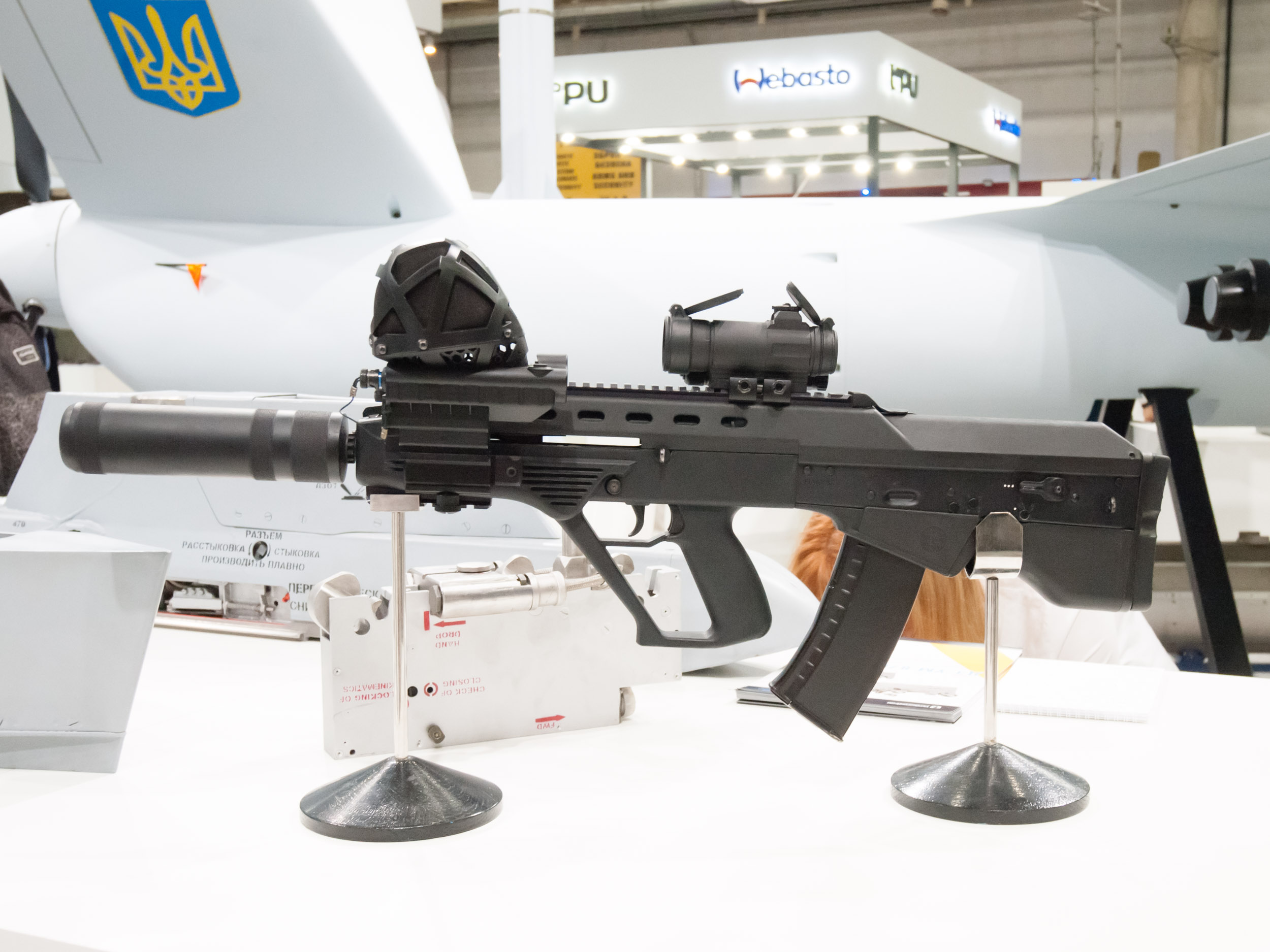
IPI Malyuk

The Steyr AUG (selected in 1977) is often cited as the first successful bullpup, in service with the armed forces of over twenty countries, and the primary rifle of Austria and Australia. It was highly advanced for the 1970s, combining in the same weapon the bullpup configuration, extensive use of polymer, dual vertical grips, an optical sight as standard, and a modular design. Highly reliable, light, and accurate, the Steyr AUG showed clearly the potential of the bullpup layout. The arrival of the FAMAS in 1978, and its adoption by France emphasized the slide from traditional to bullpup layouts within rifle designs.

The British resumed their bullpup experiments with the L85, which entered service in 1985. After persistent reliability problems, it was redesigned by the then British-owned Heckler & Koch into the L85A2, to be a fully reliable weapon. As of 2016, it was replaced by the L85A3 which is lighter, more adaptable, and more durable.

Having learned from extensive combat experience, Israel Military Industries developed a bullpup rifle: the Tavor TAR-21. The Tavor is light, accurate, fully ambidextrous and reliable (designed to stringent reliability standards to avoid malfunctioning in desert conditions), and is in increasing demand in other countries, notably India. The Tavor shares many similarities with the SAR 21 and the South African Vektor CR-21.

The Chinese People's Liberation Army adopted the Type 95 gun family in 1997, a family of bullpup firearms sharing a common receiver design, which includes the QBZ-95 standard rifle, a carbine and light support weapon variants. The Islamic Republic of Iran Army has adopted the KH-2002 in limited numbers.

Some sniper rifles that use the bullpup configuration include the American Barrett M95 and XM500, German Walther WA 2000 and DSR-1, Chinese QBU-88, Russian SVU, and Polish Bor. It is also used for combat shotgun designs such as the Neostead and Kel-Tec KSG.

Bullpups are the standard issue rifle for the armed forces of:

- Austria: Austrian Armed Forces – StG 77; selected in 1977.
- Australia: Australian Defence Force – F88 Austeyr; selected in 1989.
- Belgium: Belgian Armed Forces – FN F2000; selected in 2004.
- Colombia: Military Forces of Colombia and National Police of Colombia special forces – IWI Tavor TAR-21.
- Croatia: Croatian Army – VHS; selected in 2009.
- India: Indian Special Forces – IWI Tavor TAR-21.
- Indonesia: Indonesian Special Forces – IWI Tavor TAR-21 and Steyr AUG.
- Ireland: Irish Defence Forces – Steyr AUG; selected in 1988.
- Israel: Israel Defense Forces – IWI Tavor TAR-21; selected in 2001, used by three of the five IDF infantry brigades.
- Oman: Royal Army of Oman – Steyr AUG.
- Pakistan: Pakistan Army – FN F2000.
- Peru: Peruvian Naval Infantry – FN F2000.
- Russia: Spetsnaz – OTs-14 Groza, A-91, and SVU; selected during the 1990s.
- Singapore: Singapore Armed Forces – SAR 21; selected in 1999.
- Slovenia: Slovenian Armed Forces – FN F2000; selected in 2007.
- Tunisia: Tunisian Armed Forces, Ministry of Interior (Tunisian National Guard and Police), and Tunisian Customs - StG 77; adopted in 1984.
- Ukraine: Ukrainian Armed Forces – IPI Malyuk.
- United Kingdom: British Armed Forces – SA80; selected in 1985.

Bullpups were formerly the standard-issue rifle for the armed forces of:

- China: People's Liberation Army – Type 95; selected in 1997, being replaced by the QBZ-191 since 2019.
- France: French Armed Forces – FAMAS; selected in 1978, being replaced by the HK 416F as of 2017.
- Iran: Islamic Republic of Iran Army – Khaybar KH-2002; selected in 2004, manufactured by Defense Industries Organization (DIO), discontinued production due to frequent jamming and lack of foreign customer by the said manufacturer, replaced by the Masaf 2 in 2025.
- Malaysia: Malaysian Armed Forces – Steyr AUG; selected in 1991. Made under license from Steyr by SME Ordnance, replaced by the Colt M4A1 in 2004.
- New Zealand: New Zealand Defence Force – IW Steyr; selected in 1988, replaced by the LMT MARS in 2017.

== See also ==
- Close quarters combat
- Firing port weapon
- List of bullpup firearms
- Personal defense weapon
