= Project Grayburn =

British military assault rifle project

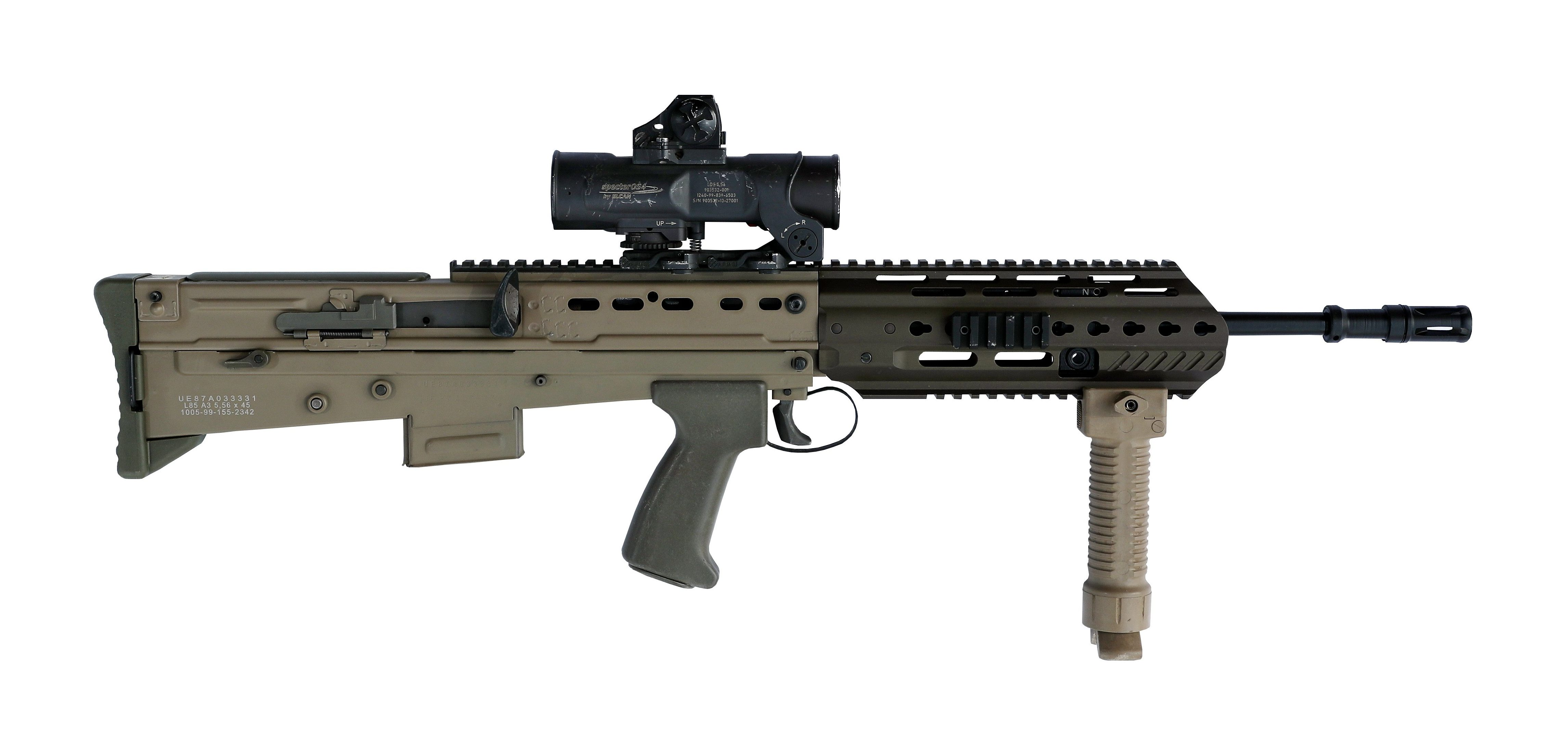
The L85A3 assault rifle, fitted with an ELCAN LDS, Shield CQB, and GPS-02 Grip Pod.

Project Grayburn (Stylised as Project GRAYBURN) is the current effort by the United Kingdom’s Ministry of Defence to replace the SA80 family of rifles, the first version of which entered service in 1985.

The project is currently in its “concept phase” ahead of the SA80’s intended 2030 retirement, with several defence manufacturers announcing their intentions to submit designs for consideration. Based on these announcements, the Project will likely result in the procurement of an AR-15 style rifle, featuring either a direct impingement or a short-stroke gas piston, chambered in 5.56x45mm NATO, and available in various barrel and gas lengths to meet requirements. It will also most likely use a top picatinny rail for the mounting of optics and accessories, and be compatible with muzzle devices.

== Context ==
The replacement for the SA80 family falls amongst many other projects to update small arms in use with the British Army, such as a replacement for the L7A2 General Purpose Machine Gun under Project Cairns, a new “assault machine gun” under Project Troubler, and a replacement for the L115 and L118 sniper rifles under Project Shamer.

Project Grayburn also comes after the recent procurement of the Knight’s Armament KS-1 under Project Hunter, entering service as the L403A1 with the Ranger Regiment and Royal Marines as an “alternative individual weapon”.

== Requirements ==
In January 2026, the Ministry of Defence issued a ‘pipeline notice’ to industry, outlining the requirements for the project.

Firstly, the notice identifies that the Joint Requirements Oversight committee intends for the new family of rifles to be manufactured domestically. This is in order to “enhance supply chains, generate employment, and provide a platform for exports”. Alongside domestic manufacturing, the project will also include a strategic relationship with the manufacturer, in order to support the family of rifles throughout their service, estimated to run from the 1st of April 2028 to the 31st of March 2045.

The project provides for 5 distinct variants of the base platform:

- Dismounted Close Combat - replacing the L85A3
- Dismounted Close Combat (Short) - replacing the L85A3
- Personal Defence Weapon - replacing the L22A2 Carbine
- Generalist - replacing the L85A2
- Cadet rifle - replacing the L98A2 Cadet GP rifle

Notably, the Dismounted Close Combat (Short) variant may also serve as the Personal Defence Weapon (PDW) or the base Dismounted Close Combat (DCC) variants. The number of weapons required is expected to be between 150,000 and 180,000 new rifles.

Other requirements include lethality to defeat current and emerging body armour, compatibility with both day-optics and in-line night vision optics, compatibility with signature reduction technology (such as suppressors and flash hiders), and an overall highly reliable rifle, “operable in all environments and climatic conditions”.

The intended calibre for the project is notably missing from this industry notice. This could indicate that the Ministry of Defence is open to the procurement of other cartridges than the highly popular 5.56x45mm NATO, in line with the United States Army’s 2025 procurement of the SIG Sauer M7, chambered in 6.8x51mm common cartridge.

In 2025, Maria Eagle, the Minister of State for Defence Procurement and Industry, answered that a new rifle-mounted grenade launcher, a replacement for the L123A3, is not within the scope of the project. She also detailed in the same response that “analysis into optimum levels of lethality in small teams is being conducted”. She provided no further insight into the continued use of under-barrel grenade launchers or grenade launchers as a whole.

== Contenders ==
Beretta NARP

Beretta Defence Technologies (BDT)

- New Assault Rifle Platform (NARP) - chambered in 5.56x45mm NATO, the NARP features a short-stroke gas piston and is available in multiple different barrel lengths. The rifle is set to enter service with the Italian Armed Forces, replacing the ARX160. BDT already has a facility for weapons testing and manufacturing in Lincolnshire.

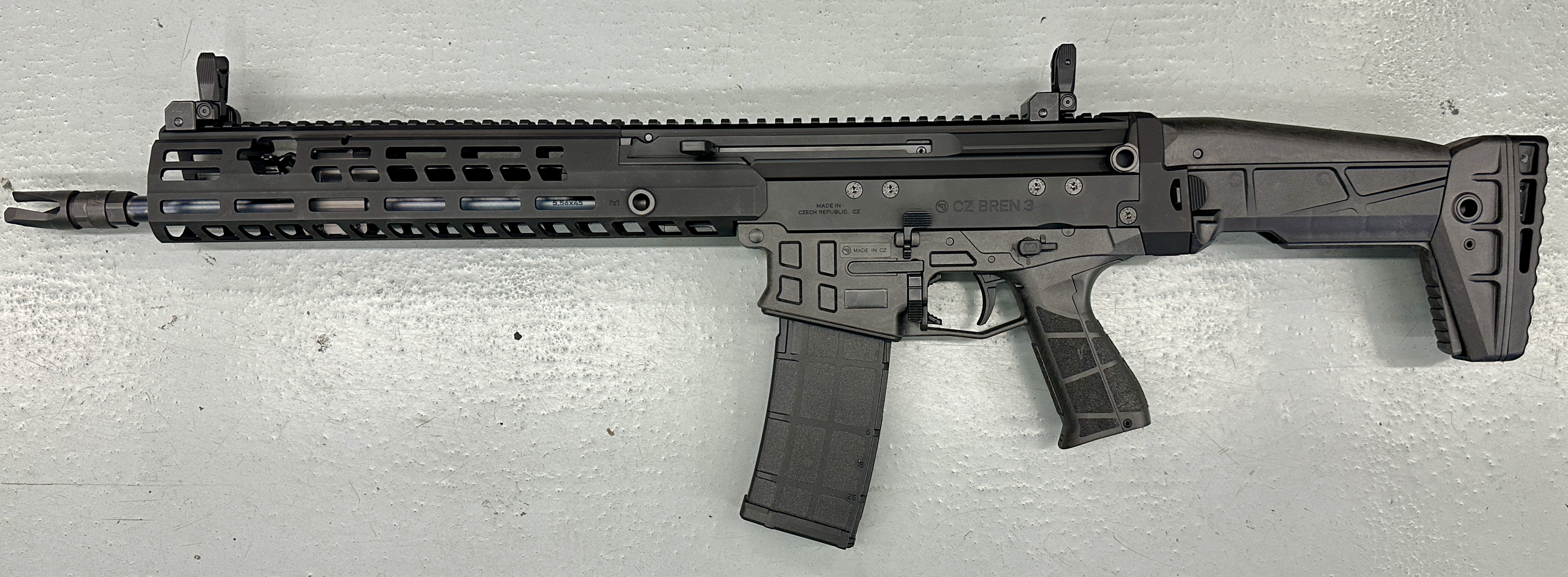
CZ BREN 3

Česká Zbrojovka (CZ)

- CZ BREN 3 - The latest version of the CZ 805 BREN and another possible contender. The rifle similarly uses a short-stroke gas piston design and AR-15 style controls, but also features a folding buttstock and is available in multiple calibres.

Colt Canada

- Canadian Modular Assault Rifle - the latest variant of the Colt Canada C7 rifle designated as the C25 which entered service in 2026, and currently used by the Canadian Forces as their standard assault rifle. The rifle is a AR-15 style gas-operated, expansion gas bleed-off system chambered in 5.56x45mm NATO and features a retractable buttstock, two-stage trigger group, ambidextrous controls, and a multi-function muzzle device that acts as a supressor for both noise and heat. The rifle is availible in multiple variants. Variants of the rifle are currently in service with the Royal Marines, the Special Air Service and Special Boat Service, the Special Forces Support Group, the Pathfinder Platoon of 16 Air Assault Brigade, Royal Military Police Close Protection teams and MoD Police, as well as numerous other countries in Europe.

FN Herstal (FNH)

- FN ARKA - revealed in June 2026 to compete in the project, FN Herstal’s latest rifle features the internal design of an FN SCAR-L with the more familiar AR-15 style controls.

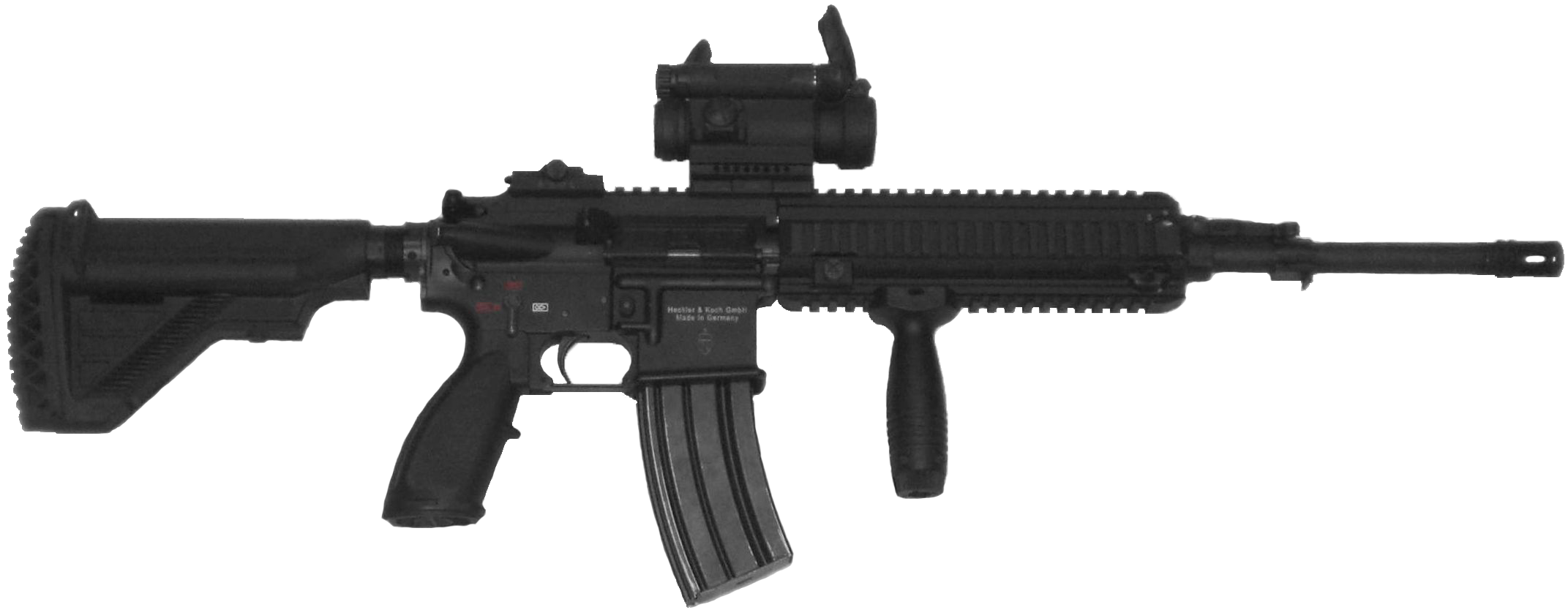
Heckler & Koch HK416

Heckler & Koch (H&K)

- HK416 - Originally the H&K alternative to the M4 Carbine, the HK416 features a short-stroke gas piston and AR-15 style controls. H&K have had a long-standing relationship with the UK MOD, providing both A2 and A3 upgrades to the SA80.
- HK433 - Formally introduced in 2017, the HK433 is a short-stroke gas piston rifle, available in 5.56x45mm NATO but notably features ambidextrous, proprietary controls and a folding adjustable buttstock, amongst other features, blending design elements of the G36 and HK416.

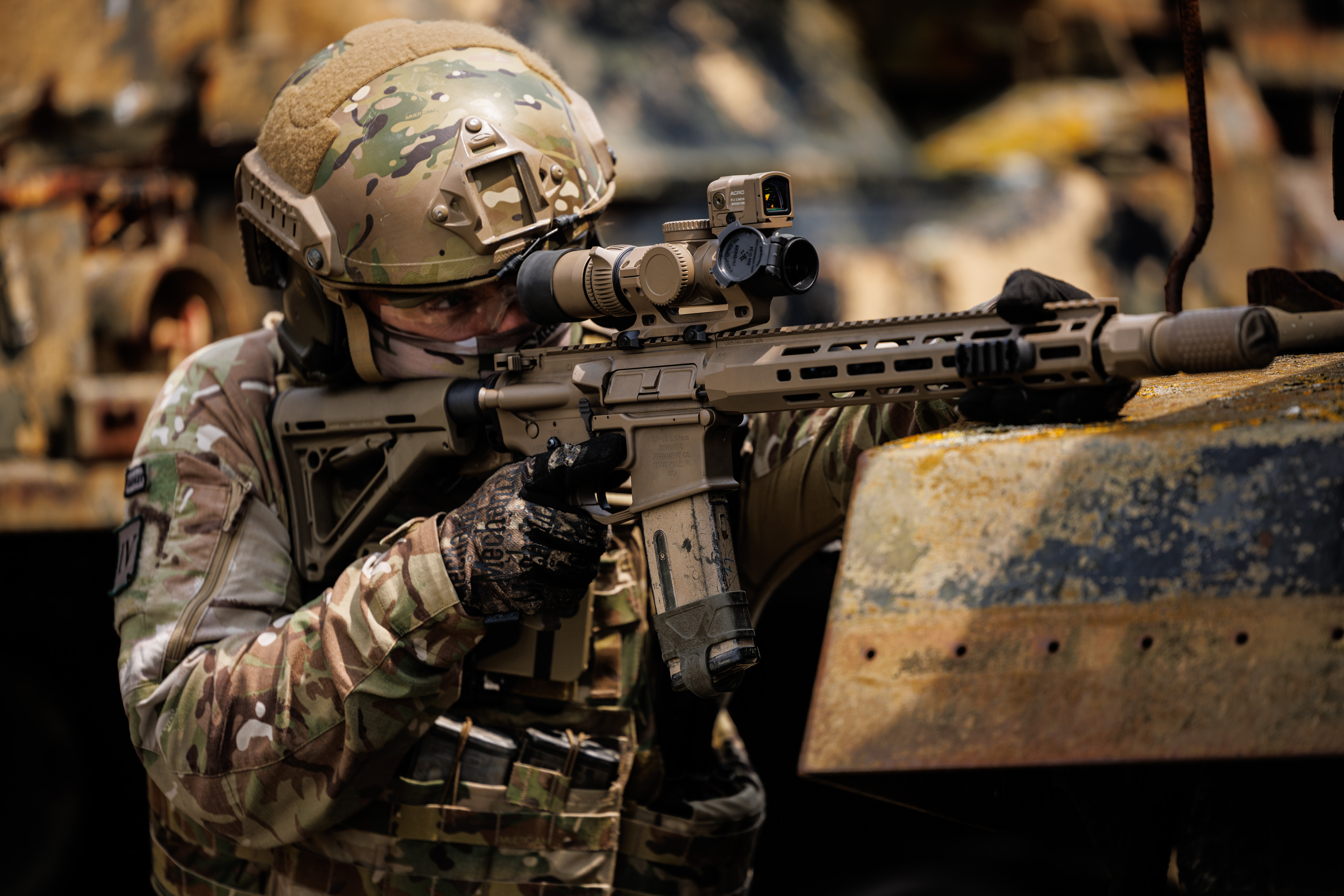
KS-1 rifle in British service as the L403A1

Knight’s Armament Company

- KS-1 - Having entered service in 2023 as the L403A1, the KS-1 is a possible contender under Project Grayburn. Aside from a direct impingement gas system and ambidextrous AR-15 style controls, the rifle also features a 13.7” heavy profile chrome-lined cold-hammer forged barrel and a free floating handguard.

Sako

- Arctic Rifle Generation (ARG) - As a subsidiary of Beretta Holding Group, the Sako ARG is the second Beretta rifle to be put forward for consideration. It features ambidextrous AR-15 style controls and a short stroke gas piston design. Key benefits of this rifle include its versatility and performance in cold weather.

SIG Sauer

- MCX SPEAR - Entering service with the US Army in 2025 under the Next Generation Squad Weapon (NGSW) programme, this 6.8x51mm rifle offers increased body armour penetration, amongst ambidextrous AR-15 style controls and a free-floating handguard. However, this possible contender’s ballistic performance comes at the cost of ammunition carrying capacity, with US soldiers carrying only two-thirds the amount of ammunition carried with the M4 Carbine.
- MCX SPEAR LT - This rifle is another possible contender from SIG Sauer and already in service as the L143A2 with the Royal Marines as of 2025. The rifle is primarily available in 5.56x45mm NATO and is available in various barrel lengths. It features ambidextrous AR-15 style controls, a free-floating handguard and has the option of a folding stock.

SSS Defence

- In February 2026, Stumpp Schuele & Somappa Defence (SSS Defence) announced its “firm decision” to bid in the competition.

== Progress ==
In May 2025, Maria Eagle confirmed that the project had entered its “concept phase”, and that its “assessment phase” was intended to begin in 2026. As of August 2026, the project is still in its concept phase.

In January 2026, the Ministry of Defence issued an industry “pipeline notice”, which set out the requirements for the project. This included capabilities, variants and manufacturing details.

== See also ==
- Next Generation Squad Weapon
- Russo-Ukrainian War (2022-present)
- SA80
