= SIG MCX =

Family of rifles manufactured by SIG Sauer

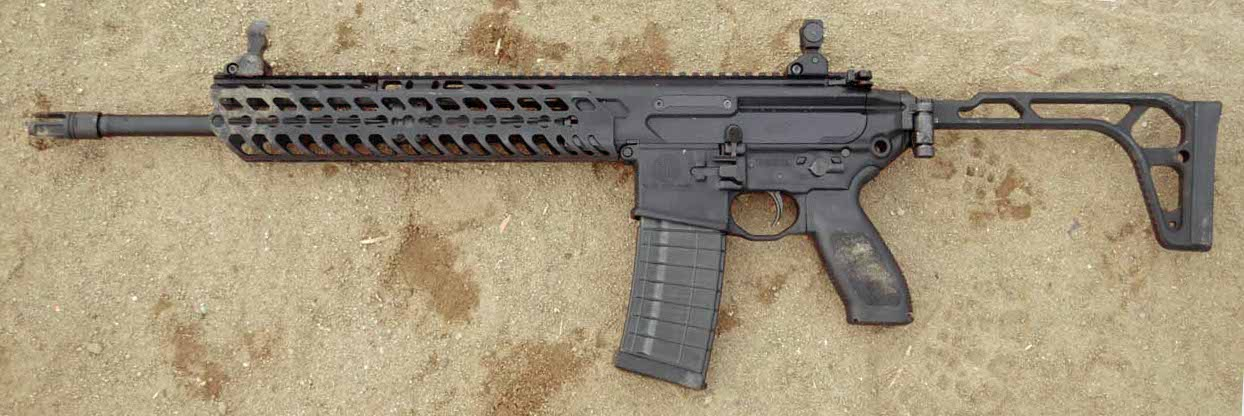
- SIG MCX with a skeleton folding stock
- Type: Assault rifle Carbine; Semi-automatic rifle
- Place of origin: United States

Service history
- In service: 2015–present
- Used by: See Users

Production history
- Designed: 2013
- Manufacturer: SIG Sauer
- Unit cost: MCX VIRTUS Patrol: MSRP US$2,233; MCX VIRTUS SBR: MSRP US$2,233; MCX VIRTUS Pistol: MSRP US$2,235
- Produced: 2015–2017 (MCX Gen I); 2017–2022 (MCX VIRTUS); 2022–present (MCX-SPEAR LT)
- Variants: See Variants

Specifications
- Mass: 2.61 kg (5.8 lb) (229 mm barrel); 2.72 kg (6.0 lb) (292 mm barrel); 3.6 kg (7.9 lb) (406 mm barrel)
- Length: 730 mm (29 in) stock unfolded (229 mm barrel); 908 mm (35.7 in) stock unfolded (406 mm barrel)
- Barrel length: 229 mm (9.0 in); 292 mm (11.5 in); 406 mm (16.0 in)
- Cartridge: 5.56×45mm NATO.300 AAC Blackout; 7.62×39mm
- Action: Gas-operated short-stroke piston system, rotating bolt
- Rate of fire: 800–900 rounds/min
- Muzzle velocity: MCX Carbine 5.56×45mm NATO: 3,000 ft/s (914 m/s)
- Effective firing range: MCX Carbine 5.56×45mm NATO: 1,650 ft (503 m)
- Feed system: 30-round STANAG detachable box magazines
- Sights: Picatinny rail for mounting various iron sights or optical sights

The SIG MCX is a family of rifles designed and manufactured by SIG Sauer, produced in both selective fire assault rifle configuration and semi-automatic only models. It features a short-stroke gas piston system, which is inherited from the earlier SIG MPX submachine gun.

The semi-automatic only variant of the MCX is available in rifle, carbine, short-barreled rifle, and pistol (short-barreled rifle configured with a pistol brace or without a buttstock at all) configurations.

The MCX served as the basis for SIG Sauer's NGSW-R submission, the SIG MCX-SPEAR, designed to chamber the .277 Fury cartridge, and was formally adopted as the M7 rifle by the U.S. Army in 2022.

== History ==
The SIG MCX was introduced at SHOT Show 2015. The rifle was originally designed by SIG USA, the subsidiary of SIG Sauer based in New Hampshire.

In 2016, SIG recalled some of the rifles that had the first-generation bolt carrier group.

The MCX has been used by various SWAT teams and militaries, including the Ukrainian Armed Forces during the Russian Invasion of Ukraine.

An MCX was used in the 2016 Orlando nightclub shooting, which was the deadliest mass shooting in U.S. history, until exceeded by the 2017 Las Vegas shooting.

== Design details ==
The SIG MCX series features a short-stroke gas piston with dual recoil spring system to reduce recoil and improve the reliability of the rifle; this was based on the design of the earlier SIG MPX. The MCX features a system that enables conversion between 5.56×45mm NATO, .300 AAC Blackout, and 7.62×39mm ammunition, using standard 5.56 mm STANAG magazines for 5.56×45mm NATO and .300 AAC Blackout, and specially designed STANAG-compatible magazines for 7.62×39mm. The MCX is designed to deliver optimal performance with .300 AAC Blackout and an optional suppressor.

The barrel's profile is tapered at the crown to enable the installation of muzzle devices and direct-thread sound suppressors without the use of washers that degrade performance and enables the devices to self-center on installation. The barrel can be changed in a matter of seconds to another length or a different caliber. Additionally the barrels are nitride coated for corrosion resistance. It features hardened steel wear points.

First generation MCX variants have a forend made of aluminum with a KeyMod system to add accessories while second generation MCX variants have an M-LOK handguard. Controls are mostly ambidextrous including the charging handle but not the bolt release. Sig produces four stock configurations for the MCX carbine. The overall layout of the two rifles is similar. SIG designed the upper receiver to be compatible with standard AR-15 and M16 lower receivers with the help of an adapter.

An integrally suppressed upper receiver group based on the MCX was selected by USSOCOM for the SURG (Suppressed Upper Receiver Group) contract in July 2018. These suppressed uppers would be paired with existing M4A1 lowers in SOCOM inventory.

== Variants ==
The SIG MCX family has undergone three generations of modifications.

=== SIG MCX (Gen I) ===
The SIG MCX is available with a safe/semi-automatic trigger group for the U.S. civilian market, or safe/semi-automatic/fully automatic trigger group for the military and law enforcement agencies.

SIG Sauer offers the MCX in semi-automatic only in three different configurations for the civilian market:

- The SIG MCX PATROL is the standard configuration of the rifle with a 406 mm (16 in) barrel.
- The SIG MCX SBR is a short-barreled rifle configuration of the rifle with a 229 mm (9 in) barrel. (Note: Under U.S. federal law, rifles with barrels shorter than 16 inches are Title II weapons, which are subject to federal restrictions, as well as being regulated by state laws)
- The SIG MCX Pistol is the pistol configuration of the rifle with a 229 mm (9 in) barrel or 292 mm (11.5 in) barrel and comes either with the SIG Sauer SBX (pistol stabilizing brace) or SIG Sauer PCB (pistol pivoting contour folding brace).

=== SIG MCX VIRTUS (Gen II) ===
The SIG MCX VIRTUS is the second generation of the SIG MCX series and was introduced in 2017.

- The SIG MCX VIRTUS Patrol is the standard configuration rifle that features a 406 mm (16 in) barrel, a 1:7 inch twist, a custom SIG Matchlite Duo Trigger for improved accuracy, a folding and collapsing 5-position stock, four handguard lengths to choose from, interchangeable barrels and a special internal recoil system.
- The SIG MCX VIRTUS SBR is the short-barreled rifle configuration of the MCX VIRTUS. It features a 292 mm (11.5 in) barrel for the 5.56×45mm NATO caliber, and a 140 mm (5.5 in) barrel and 229 mm (9 in) barrel for the .300 AAC Blackout caliber.
- The SIG MCX VIRTUS Pistol is the pistol configuration of the MCX VIRTUS which features an SBX stabilizer brace. It features an 292 mm (11.5 in) barrel for the 5.56×45mm NATO caliber, and a 229 mm (9 in) barrel for the .300 AAC Blackout caliber.

=== SIG MCX-SPEAR LT (Gen III) ===
The SIG MCX-SPEAR LT is the third generation of the SIG MCX, introduced in 2022. With the release of the MCX-SPEAR LT, SIG also designed a new, padded, side-folding stock with an FDE finish option to match the rifles, which civilian versions of the rifle variant are sold with. While the civilian version is referred to as the "MCX-SPEAR LT", referencing the SPEAR from which it derives many of its improvements over the MCX Virtus line, SIG Sauer refers to the military versions as simply the "MCX LT" or "MCX Lightweight".

The defining features of the MCX-SPEAR LT are a lightened handguard and barrel design (borrowed from the MCX-SPEAR), an ambidextrous bolt catch and release, a proprietary SL muzzle device to allow for the use of SIG SAUER's quick detaching SLX and SLH suppressors, a custom 28-round AR-pattern magazines when chambered in 7.62×39mm cartridge, and a coyote brown coating (black options are still available for purchase).

The MCX-SPEAR LT is available in 5.56×45mm NATO, .300 Blackout and 7.62×39mm calibers. The civilian model features 11.5 in (290 mm) or 16 in (410 mm) barrel and a Picatinny rail tail interface for attaching either a buttstock or a pistol brace. The military model features both of these options, with the addition of 14.5 in (370 mm) and 9 in (230 mm) barrels, as well as a custom two-stage match grade select-fire trigger group.

=== SIG MCX LVAW ===
The SIG MCX LVAW (Low Visibility Assault Weapon) is a short-barreled, suppressed, select-fire variant available only to military and law enforcement agencies. It is nicknamed the "Black Mamba".

=== SIG MCX RATTLER ===
The SIG MCX RATTLER is a short-barreled rifle variant chambered in either .300 AAC Blackout and 5.56×45mm NATO. It is intended to serve as a personal defense weapon, featuring a 140 mm (5.5 in) barrel, and comes with a Picatinny rail tail interface for attaching either a compact buttstock or a folding PCB (pistol contour brace). In February 2018, USSOCOM ordered upper receiver group conversion kits for the MCX Rattler in .300BLK for evaluation.

The MCX Rattler was later selected as the winner of SOCOM's Commercial Personal Defense Weapon (CPDW) contract in May 2022 and suppressed MCX Rattlers will be ordered in 5.56 and .300BLK.

The SIG MCX Rattler LT is a variant that incorporates the design features of the MCX-SPEAR LT.

== Derivatives ==
=== SIG MCX-MR ===
The SIG MCX-MR (Mid Range) is a prototype chambered in 7.62×51mm NATO cartridge and was SIG Sauer's unsuccessful submission for the United States Army's Compact Semi-Automatic Sniper System (CSASS) program. The MCX-MR features both an M16/AR-15 type charging handle and a left side charging handle, a selective fire trigger mechanism, and uses a 20-round SR-25 pattern magazines. It has an empty weight of 8.9 lb (4.0 kg) and a 406 mm (16.0 in) fluted, 416 stainless steel barrel with a 1:10 inch twist, which is manufactured by Bartlein Barrels. The gas system features suppressed and unsuppressed settings. Unlike the handguard of the MCX, which slides off after pulling the front pivot pin, the MCX-MR requires popping off two screws first.

=== SIG MCX-SPEAR ===
The SIG MCX-SPEAR was developed as SIG Sauer's submission for the United States Army Next Generation Squad Weapon (NGSW) program and is chambered in 6.8×51mm Common Cartridge (.277 Fury) cartridge. SIG Sauer was chosen as the winner on 19 April 2022, formerly designated as the XM5, then was later changed to the XM7 and was later type classified as the M7 rifle in the U.S. Army service.

== Users ==
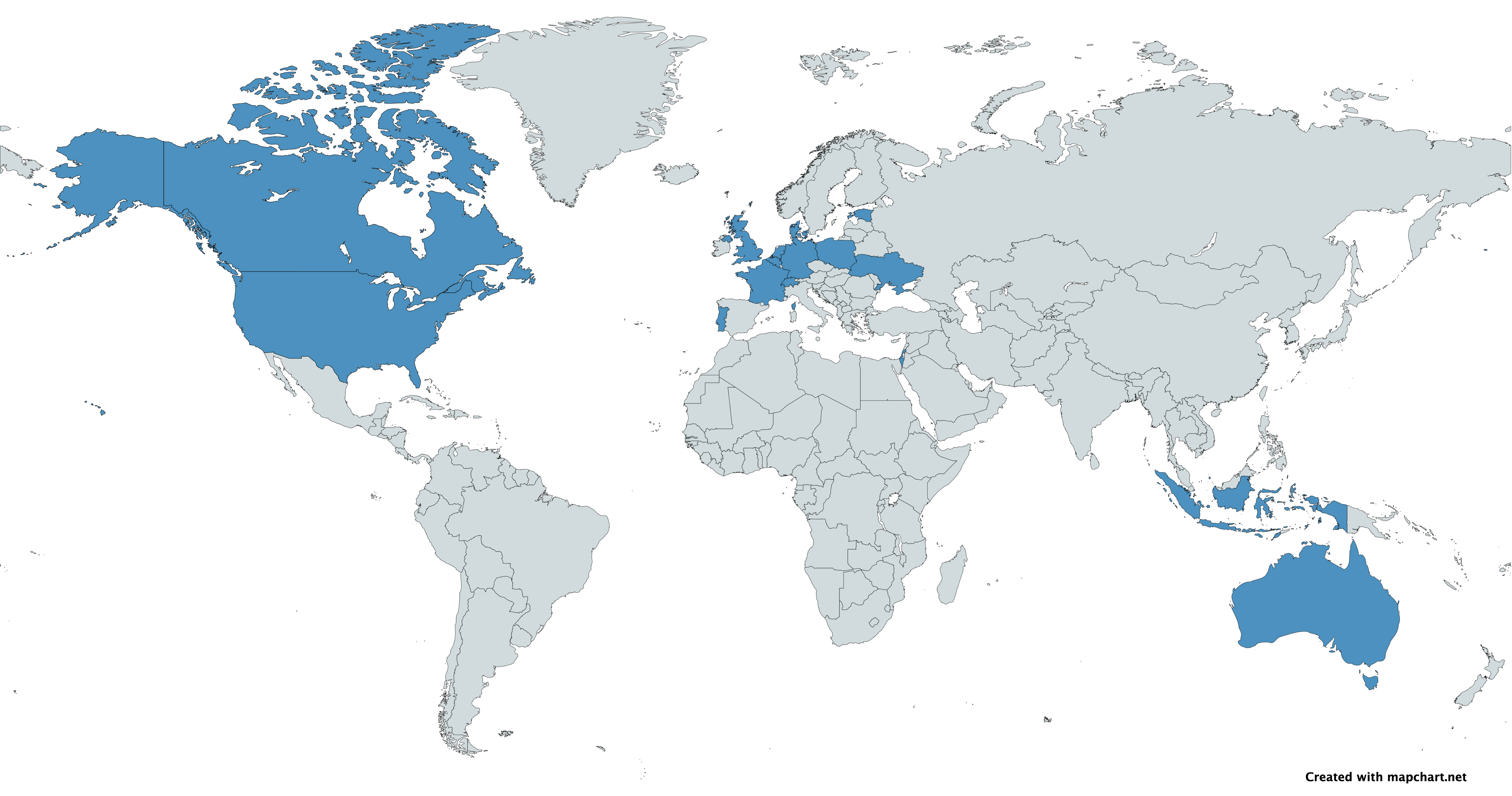
Map with SIG MCX users in blue

- Australia: MCX Rattler used by the NSW Police Force Tactical Operations Unit and Victoria Police Special Operations Group in .300 AAC Blackout. .300 AAC Blackout variants have been acquired for Army special forces units since 2024 to replace the H&K MP5.
- Belgium: Used by the Directorate of special units and the special response unit of the Ghent local police (COPS).
- Canada: Used by the Saskatchewan Conservation Officers, Canadian Special Operations Forces Command.
- Denmark: Used by the Jægerkorpset, Rigspolitiet phasing in until 2027.
- Estonia: Used by the K-Commando.
- France: Used by the Groupement de commandos de montagne, 27th Mountain Infantry Brigade, 5 in 2021.
- Germany: Used by the Berlin Police, 300 modified MCXs to meet the police's requirements were ordered in October 2017, plus an additional 160 units for the SEK of Berlin, Landespolizei of Schleswig Holstein, 531 units delivered, and Rhineland-Palatinate Police had ordered 100 more units in late 2019.
- Israel: Used by Shayetet 13, the Israel Defense Forces Naval Commando unit.
- Italy: Used by Comando Raggruppamento Subacquei e Incursori Teseo Tesei (Frogmen) of the Italian Navy.
- Indonesia: Used by Kopassus (Special Forces Command) of the Indonesian Army in limited service; Detachment 88 and Mobile Brigade Corps of the Indonesian National Police; Also used by Kopasgat (Quick Reaction Forces Command) of the Indonesian Air Force; and Koopssus (Special Operations Command) of the Indonesian National Armed Forces.
- Malta: Used by C company, 1st Regiment of the Armed Forces of Malta.
- Netherlands: Used by the Netherlands Maritime Special Operations Forces and the Dienst Speciale Interventies. The rifles are chambered for .300 AAC Blackout and fitted with the SIG Suppressed Upper Receiver.
- Poland: Jednostka Wojskowa Grom and JW Formoza acquired the SIG MCX VIRTUS and MCX RATTLER in .300 AAC Blackout with conversion kits to 5.56×45mm NATO and 7.62×39mm ammunition. Also used by Internal Security Agency and State Protection Service.
- Portugal: Polícia de Segurança Pública acquired the MCX in 5.56×45mm NATO. Used by Special Operations Group (Portugal).
- Switzerland: Used by the Geneva Police.
- Spain: Used by Spanish Navy and Civil Guard.
- Ukraine: Used by the SBU Alpha Group.
- Sweden: Used by Swedish Military Intelligence and Security Service National Intelligence Unit.
- United Kingdom: Used by the Police Counter Terrorist Specialist Firearms Officers including the Metropolitan Police Service and United Kingdom Special Forces to replace the HK MP5SD3s. Adopted as the L143A2 by United Kingdom Commando Force Littoral Response Group (LRG). In March 2025, 1,500 MCXs were ordered for the Royal Marines. The MCX is used in both 5.56×45mm NATO and .300 AAC Blackout cartridges in British military service, with colour-coded accessories being used to ensure that a given MCX uses its correct calibre (tan accessories for 5.56mm variants and black accessories for .300 AAC Blackout variants).
- United States: Various MCX variants including the RSAR (Reduced Signature Assault Rifle), LVAW (Low Visibility Assault Weapon) and the CSAW (Close Support Assault Weapon) are used by Joint Special Operations Command. Up to 100 MCXs were ordered by the U.S. Army through a commercial off-the-shelf contract in December 2018.

== See also ==
- AR-15 style rifle
- AR-18
- LR-300
