= SIG MCX Spear =

SIG Sauer multi-caliber rifle

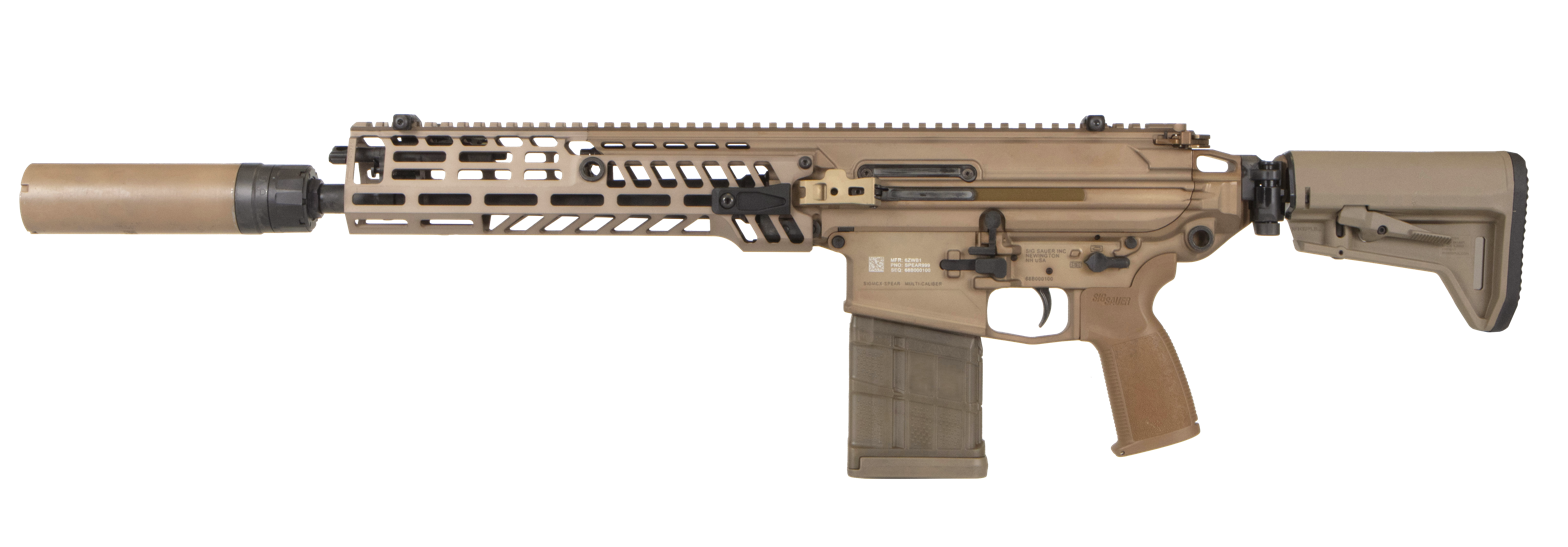
- M7, U.S. Army variant of the SIG MCX Spear
- Type: Battle rifle; Carbine; Designated marksman rifle; Semi-automatic rifle
- Place of origin: United States

Service history
- In service: 2022–present

Production history
- Designed: 2019
- Manufacturer: SIG Sauer

Specifications
- Mass: 8.38 lb (3.80 kg)
- Length: 36 in (914 mm)
- Barrel length: 13 in (330 mm)
- Cartridge: .277 Fury; 7.62×51mm NATO; 6.5mm Creedmoor
- Action: Short-stroke gas-operated piston system, rotating bolt
- Muzzle velocity: 915 m/s (3,002 ft/s)
- Feed system: SR-25 pattern magazines

The SIG MCX Spear (stylized as MCX-SPEAR) is a multi-caliber rifle developed by the American division of SIG Sauer for the NGSW program.

The SIG MCX Spear is based on SIG's previous submission for the CSASS program (MCX-MR). It is primarily chambered in .277 Fury, and is also available in 7.62×51mm NATO and 6.5mm Creedmoor. Switching calibers can be done by swapping the barrel and magazine.

== History ==
In January 2019, the United States military began the Next Generation Squad Weapon Program to find replacements for the M4 carbine and M249 Squad Automatic Weapon. In September 2019, SIG Sauer submitted their designs. The MCX Spear was designed to fire the 6.8×51mm SIG Fury cartridge in response to concerns that improvements in body armor would diminish the effectiveness of common battlefield rounds such as the 5.56×45mm NATO (used in the M4 and M249 SAW) and 7.62×51mm NATO. The decision to make the Spear available to the public was criticized by some anti-gun and law enforcement groups.

In January 2022, the SIG MCX Spear was released on the civilian market.

On April 19, 2022, the United States Army awarded a 10-year contract to SIG Sauer to produce the M7 rifle, along with the M250 light machine gun, to replace the M4 carbine and M249 Squad Automatic Weapon, respectively.

=== Development ===
The U.S. Army's push to procure a new caliber was largely driven by the underwhelming effectiveness of the 5.56×45mm NATO cartridge in long-range combat against insurgents from Afghanistan, and the need for overmatch against Chinese and Russian body armor. The M4 carbines and M249 SAWs chambered in 5.56×45mm NATO did not have the firepower to effectively engage in long-range firefights. The 7.62×51mm NATO cartridge was also found inadequate, which led to the development of a new caliber. SIG Sauer developed the .277 Fury cartridge to maintain higher muzzle velocity over longer distances, which allows for more accurate longer-range shot placement.

== Variants ==
=== M7 ===
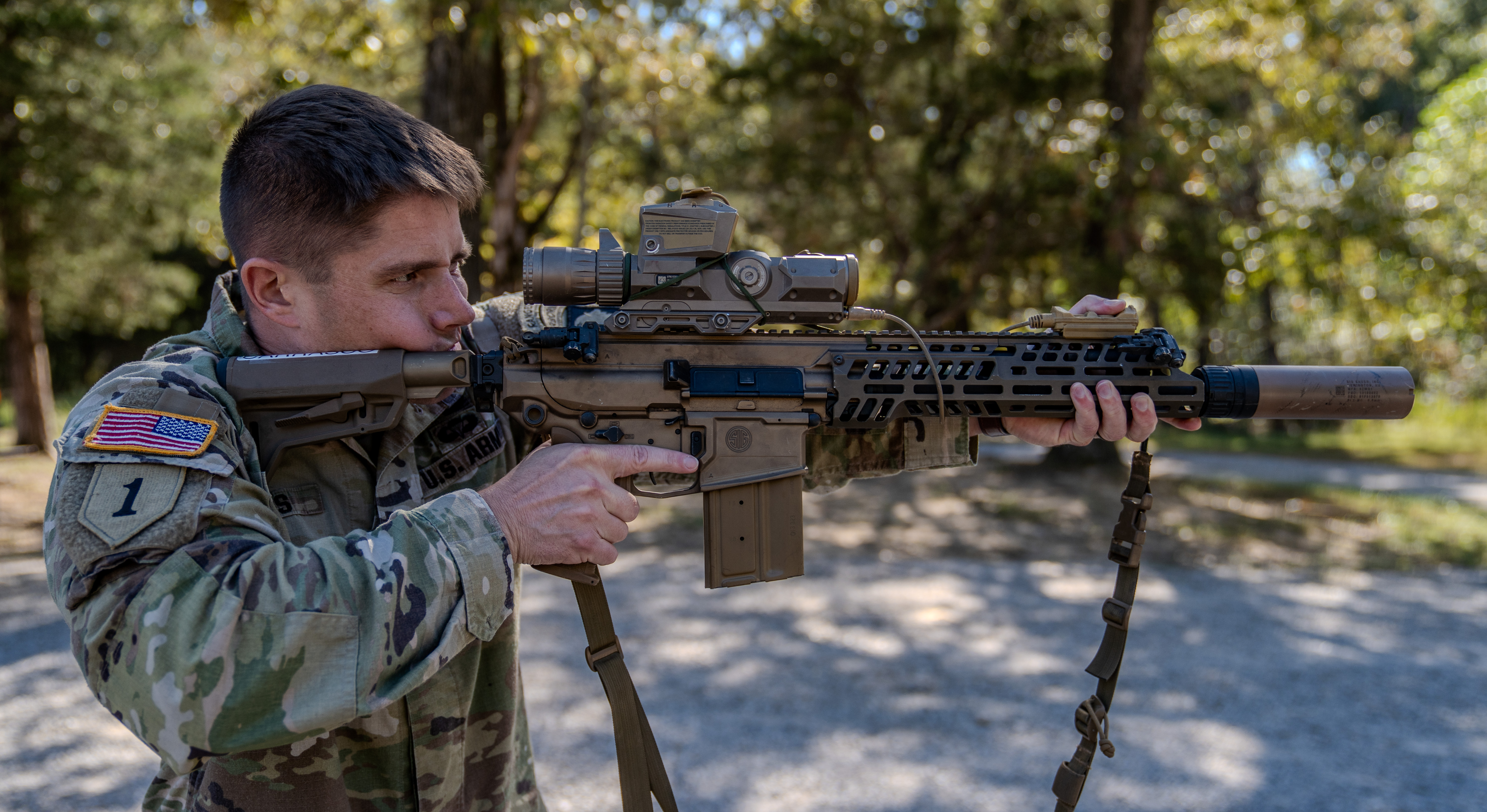
U.S. Army soldier with an M7

The SIG MCX Spear was SIG Sauer's submission for the United States Army Next Generation Squad Weapon (NGSW) program, chambered in .277 Fury cartridge. Sig Sauer was chosen as the winner on April 19, 2022, initially designating the rifle as the XM5, then was redesignated as the XM7 in U.S. military service. It was later officially adopted by the US Army as the M7 rifle.

=== M8 ===
A product improved carbine variant was later developed based on soldiers' feedback. It was initially designated as the XM8 carbine (unrelated to the Heckler & Koch XM8) before being officially adopted as the M8 carbine.

=== MCX Spear DMR ===
The SIG MCX Spear DMR is a designated marksman rifle variant that features a folding skeletonized stock.

=== Prototypes ===
==== MCX-MR ====
The SIG MCX-MR (Mid Range) was SIG Sauer's unsuccessful submission for the United States Army's Compact Semi-Automatic Sniper System (CSASS) program. It is chambered in 7.62×51mm NATO and has selective fire capabilities. It weighs 8.9 lb (4.0 kg) and features a 16 in (410 mm) 416 stainless steel barrel with a 1:10 inch twist rate, which is manufactured by Bartlein Barrels. The gas system features suppressed and unsuppressed settings. Unlike the handguard of the MCX, which slides off after pulling the front pivot pin, the MCX-MR requires the removal of two screws first. It features both an M16/AR-15 type charging handle and a left side charging handle. It uses a 20-round magazine and is also compatible with SR-25 lower receivers for use of SR-25 box magazines.

==== MCX Raptor ====
The SIG MCX Raptor is a short-barreled rifle prototype intended to serve as a carbine variant, featuring an 8 in (200 mm) barrel and a Picatinny rail tail interface for attaching either a compact buttstock or a folding PCB (pistol contour brace). Designed to be compatible with the .277 Fury, 6.5 Creedmoor and 7.62×51mm NATO cartridges.

== See also ==
- SIG MCX
