= Vortex Optics =

American manufacturer of optical equipments

- Company type: Corporation
- Industry: Optical Imaging
- Founded: 2004; 22 years ago in Middleton, Wisconsin, United States
- Founder: Daniel C. Hamilton
- Headquarters: Barneveld, Wisconsin, United States
- Products: Precision binoculars, spotting scopes, riflescopes, and other optical instruments.
- Number of employees: Approx. 400
- Website: Vortex Optics

Vortex Optics is an American manufacturer of special optical equipments for hunting, wildlife watching, outdoor recreation, shooting sports and law enforcement and military. Vortex products include binoculars, spotting scopes, riflescopes, reflex sights, holographic sights and other accessories. It once had a sister company known as Eagle Optics, which developed optics for birdwatchers.

== History ==
Vortex Optics is a DBA of Sheltered Wings, Inc., which was incorporated in Wisconsin in 1989. Sheltered Wings, Inc. DBA Vortex Optics began in 2002.

In 2022 after extensive research, testing and reviews Vortex became an official supplier and contractor to the American Military as the U.S. Army selected Vortex's XM-157 fire control system for its Next Generation Squad Weapon program.

== Products ==
Vortex Optics is based in Barneveld, Wisconsin, and currently sells binoculars, monoculars, spotting scopes, riflescopes, red dot sights and related accessories.

Riflescopes

- AMG (American Made Glass)
- Razor HD
- Viper series
- Golden Eagle HD
- Strike Eagle
- Venom
- Diamondback
- Crossfire II
- Copperhead
- Triumph HD

Red dot sights

- Razor
- Viper
- Defender Series
- SPARC II
- Strikefire II
- Crossfire
- Spitfire

Holographic sight

- Razor AMG UH-1 (Gen II released on mid July, 2020)

Binoculars

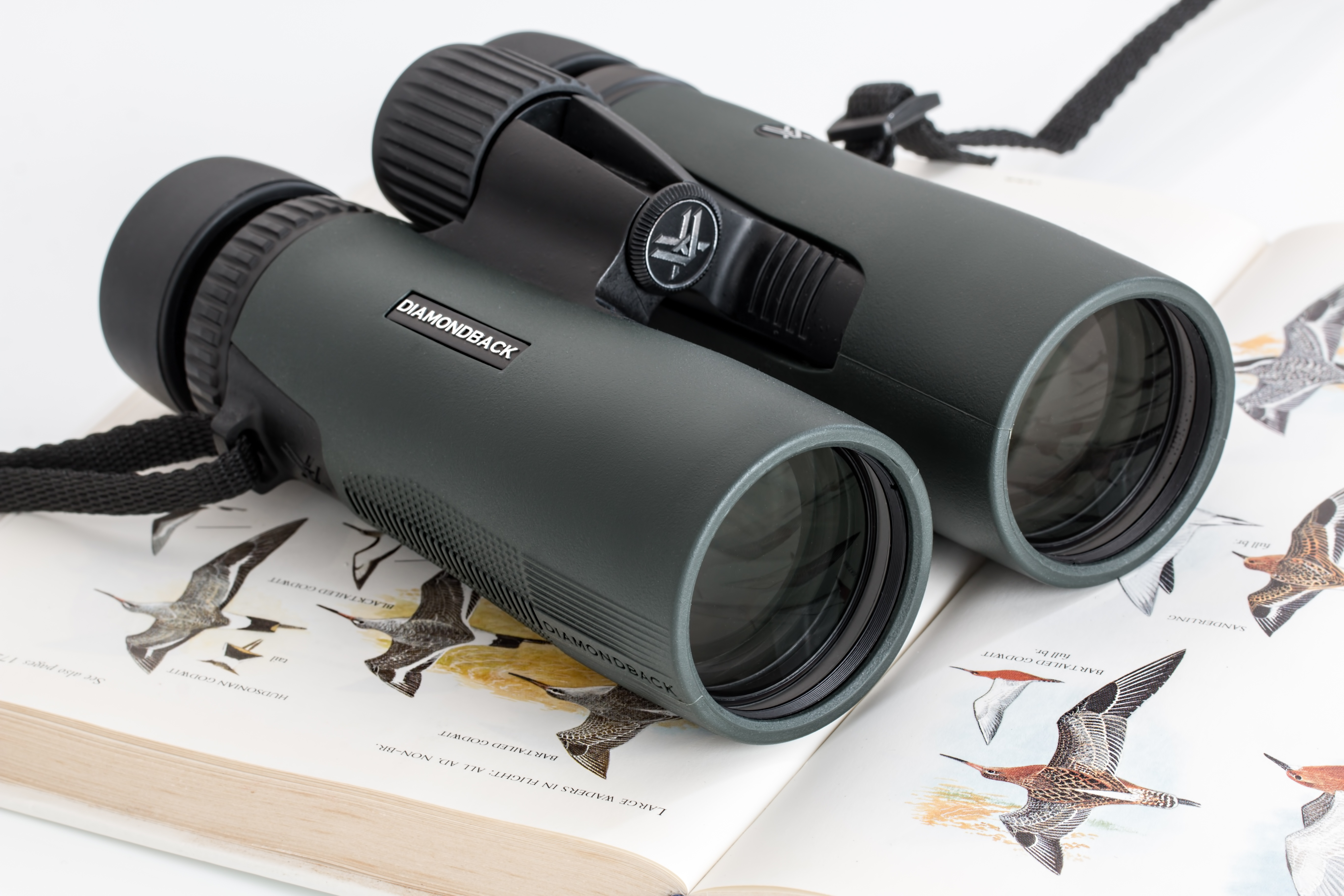
Vortex Diamondback roof prism binoculars

- Razor UHD
- Razor HD
- Kaibab HD
- Fury HD
- Viper series
- Vulture
- Hurricane
- Diamondback
- Crossfire
- Raptor
- Vanquish

Monoculars

- Recce Pro HD
- Recon
- Solo

Spotting scope

- Razor HD
- Viper HD
- Diamondback HD
- Crossfire HD

Rangefinder

- Fury HD
- Razor HD
- Viper HD
- Diamondback HD
- Crossfire
- Ranger
- Impact 4000

Tripods

- Radian Carbon
- Switchback Carbon
- Ridgeview Carbon
- Summit Carbon II
- High Country
- Mountain Pass
