= M250 light machine gun =

U.S Army's NGSW-AR light machine gun

M250
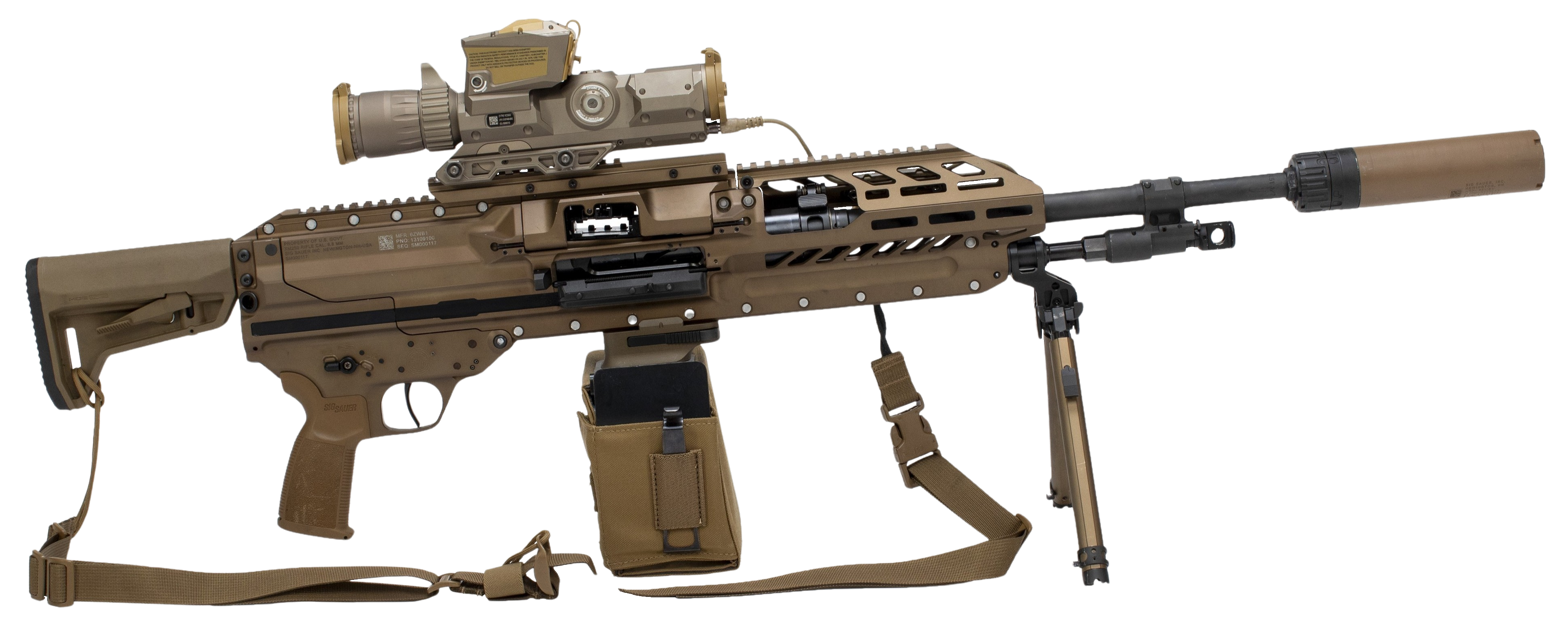
- M250 with an M157 fire-control system and suppressor
- Type: Light machine gun
- Place of origin: United States

Service history
- In service: 2022–present
- Used by: See Users

Production history
- Designed: 2019
- Manufacturer: SIG Sauer
- Variants: See Variants

Specifications
- Mass: 13 lb (5.9 kg) (with bipod); 14.5 lb (6.6 kg) (with suppressor and bipod)
- Length: 41.87 in (1,063 mm) (with suppressor)
- Barrel length: 17.5 in (444 mm)
- Cartridge: 6.8×51mm Common Cartridge (.277 Fury)
- Action: Gas-operated short-stroke piston with a proprietary recoil mitigation system, open bolt
- Rate of fire: 700–950 rounds/min
- Feed system: 50- or 100-rounds in semi-rigid pouches

The M250, formerly the XM250, is the U.S. Army's designation for the SIG LMG-6.8, chambered in 6.8×51mm Common Cartridge (.277 Fury), gas-operated, belt-fed light machine gun that features a proprietary recoil mitigation system, designed by SIG Sauer for the U.S. Army as part of the Next Generation Squad Weapon Program in 2022 to replace the M249 Squad Automatic Weapon, and began to be fielded in March 2024.

== History ==
In January 2019, the United States military began the Next Generation Squad Weapon Program to find replacements for the M4 carbine and M249 Squad Automatic Weapon. In September 2019, SIG Sauer submitted prototypes of the M7 rifle and M250 light machine gun. The design of the XM250 was derived from the SIG Sauer MMG 338 which SIG was also developing for the United States Special Operations Command (SOCOM). The M250 light machine gun and M7 rifle were designed for the 6.8×51mm Common Cartridge in response to concerns that improvements in body armor would diminish the effectiveness of the 5.56×45mm NATO (used in the M4 carbine and M249 Squad Automatic Weapon) and 7.62×51mm NATO (used in the M240 medium machine gun).

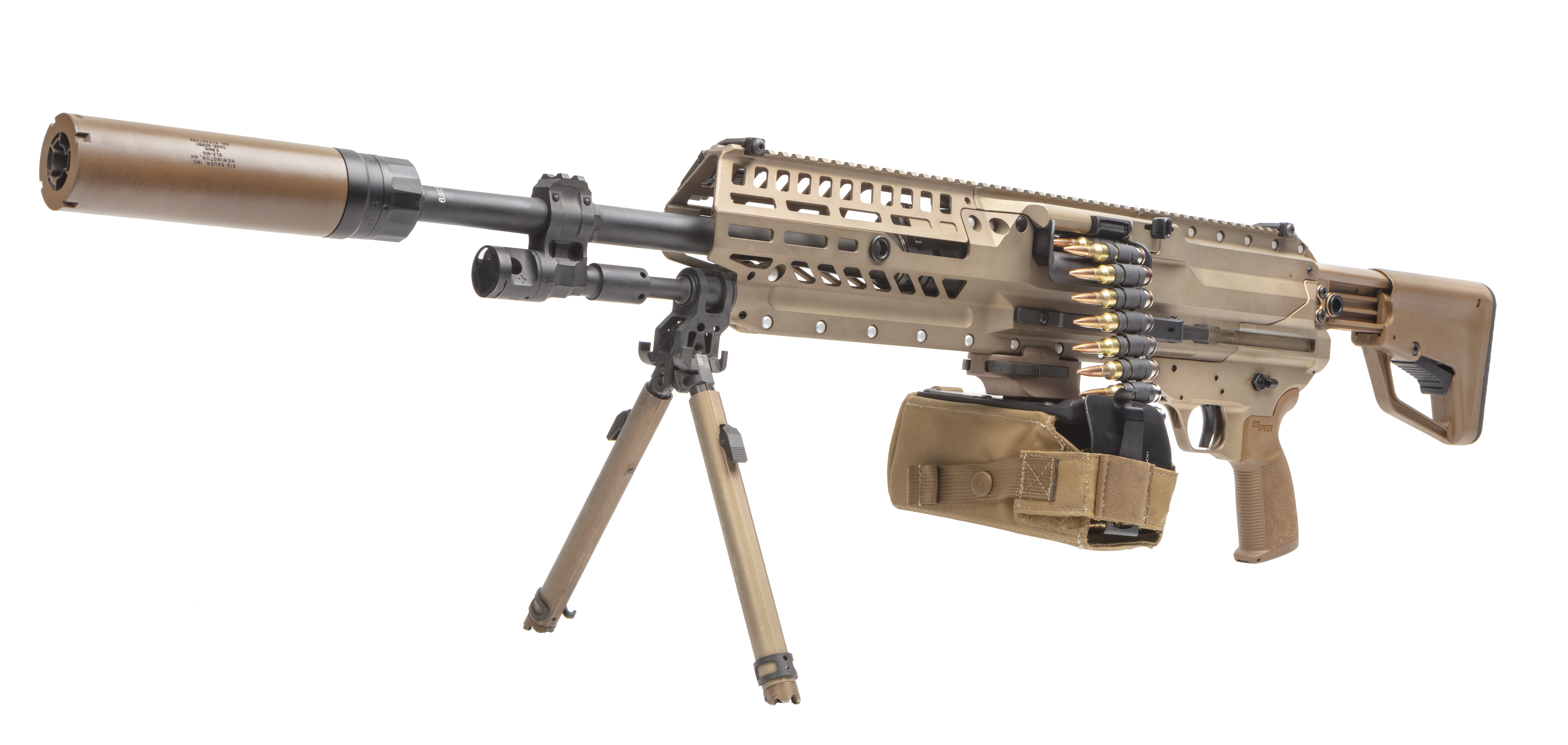
XM250 with a 50-round semi-rigid ammunition pouch

On 19 April 2022, the United States Army awarded a 10-year contract to SIG Sauer to produce the XM250 light machine gun, along with the XM5 rifle (later redesignated XM7), to replace the M249 Squad Automatic Weapon and M4 carbine, respectively. The names were chosen as the next numbers sequentially to the weapons they will replace. The first batch of 25 XM7s and 15 XM250s were planned to be delivered in late 2023. In total, the Army plans to procure a total of 107,000 XM7s and 13,000 XM250s for close combat forces. The contract includes an option to build additional XM7s and XM250s should the U.S. Marine Corps and U.S. Special Operations Command choose to be included.

In September 2023, the XM250 was delivered to soldiers in the 101st Airborne Division and 75th Ranger Regiment for user tests. 1st Battalion, 506th Infantry Regiment of the 101st Airborne Division officially began fielding it in March 2024.

In May 2025, the XM250 was type classified as the M250 light machine gun.

== Design details ==
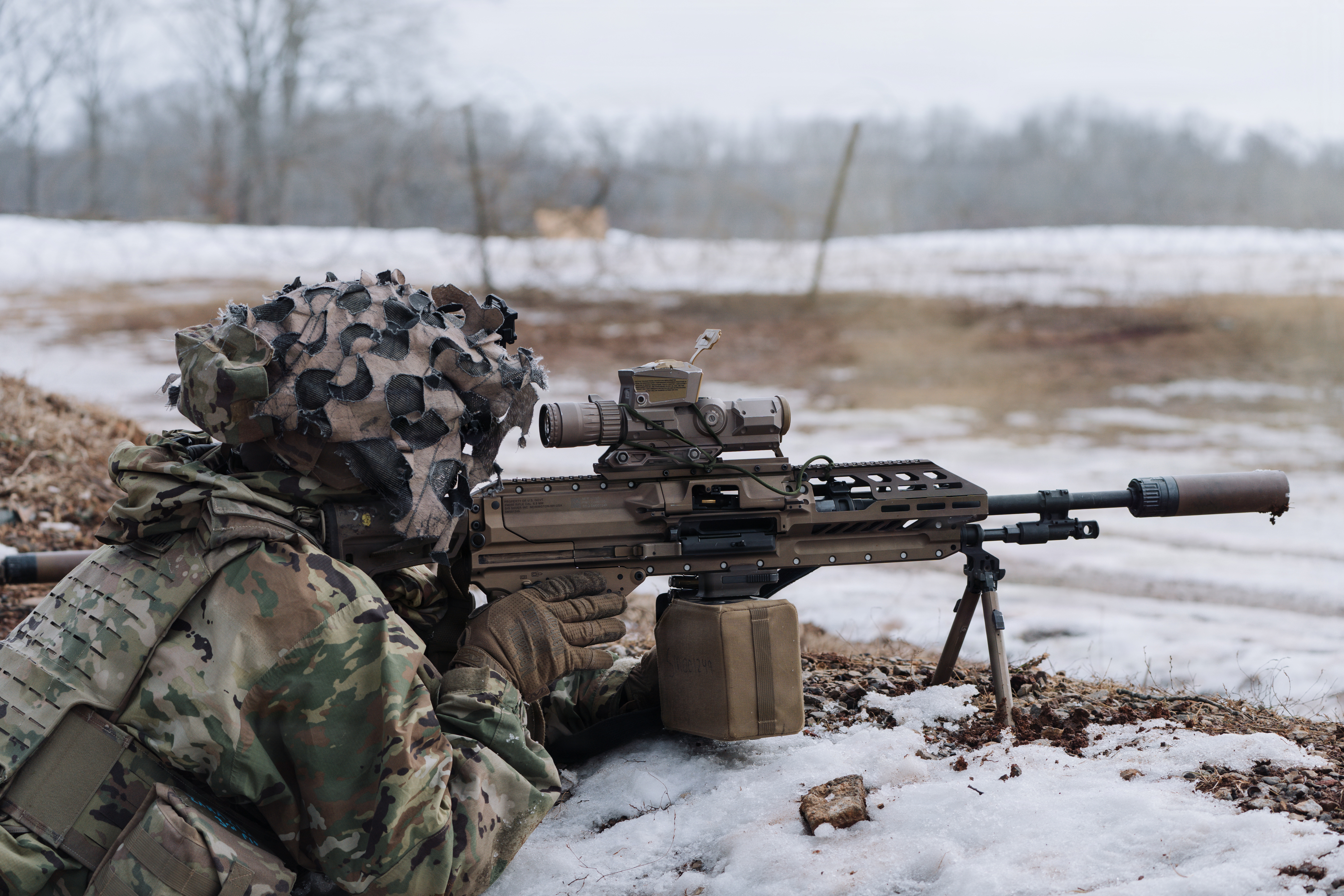
U.S. infantryman firing an M250 during a combined arms live-fire exercise (CALFEX), 2026

The M250 features a free-floating reinforced M-LOK handguard for direct accessory attachment onto the "negative space" (hollow slot) mounting points. The barrel on the M250 is not considered a quick-change barrel, and the stock is collapsible but non-folding.

The M250 primarily uses the M157 fire-control system, also known as the Vortex Optics NGSW-FC. The optical sight integrates a laser rangefinder (LRF), ballistic solver, environmental sensors, aiming lasers, digital compass, and wireless communication to provide seamless battlefield connectivity. Built around a 1-8×30 LPVO with a glass-etched reticle, it is lightweight and durable, capable of withstanding extreme conditions. The M157 features a digital display that provides corrected aimpoints, wind holds, and other critical targeting data, allowing for rapid target engagement.

The M250 weighs 13 lb (5.9 kg), or 14.5 lb (6.6 kg) with a suppressor. It has a basic combat load of 400 rounds in four 100-round pouches weighing 27.1 lb (12.3 kg). The 100-round pouch has a loaded weight of 6.77 lb (3.07 kg). Compared to the M249 Squad Automatic Weapon weighing 19.2 lb (8.7 kg) unsuppressed, with a basic combat load of 600 rounds in three 200-round pouches, weighing 20.8 lb (9.4 kg), the M250 weighs about 4 lb (1.8 kg) less which makes an operator carry roughly a 1 lb (0.45 kg) heavier load with 200 fewer rounds.

== Variants ==
=== M250A1 ===
The M250A1 is an improved variant that features weight reduction and a 13 in (330 mm) barrel length.

=== SIG SAUER LMG ===
The SIG SAUER LMG is the general product name of the light machine gun family, available in 6.5mm Creedmoor (SIG LMG-6.5), 6.8×51mm Common Cartridge (SIG LMG-6.8) and 7.62×51mm NATO (SIG LMG-7.62).

== Gallery ==
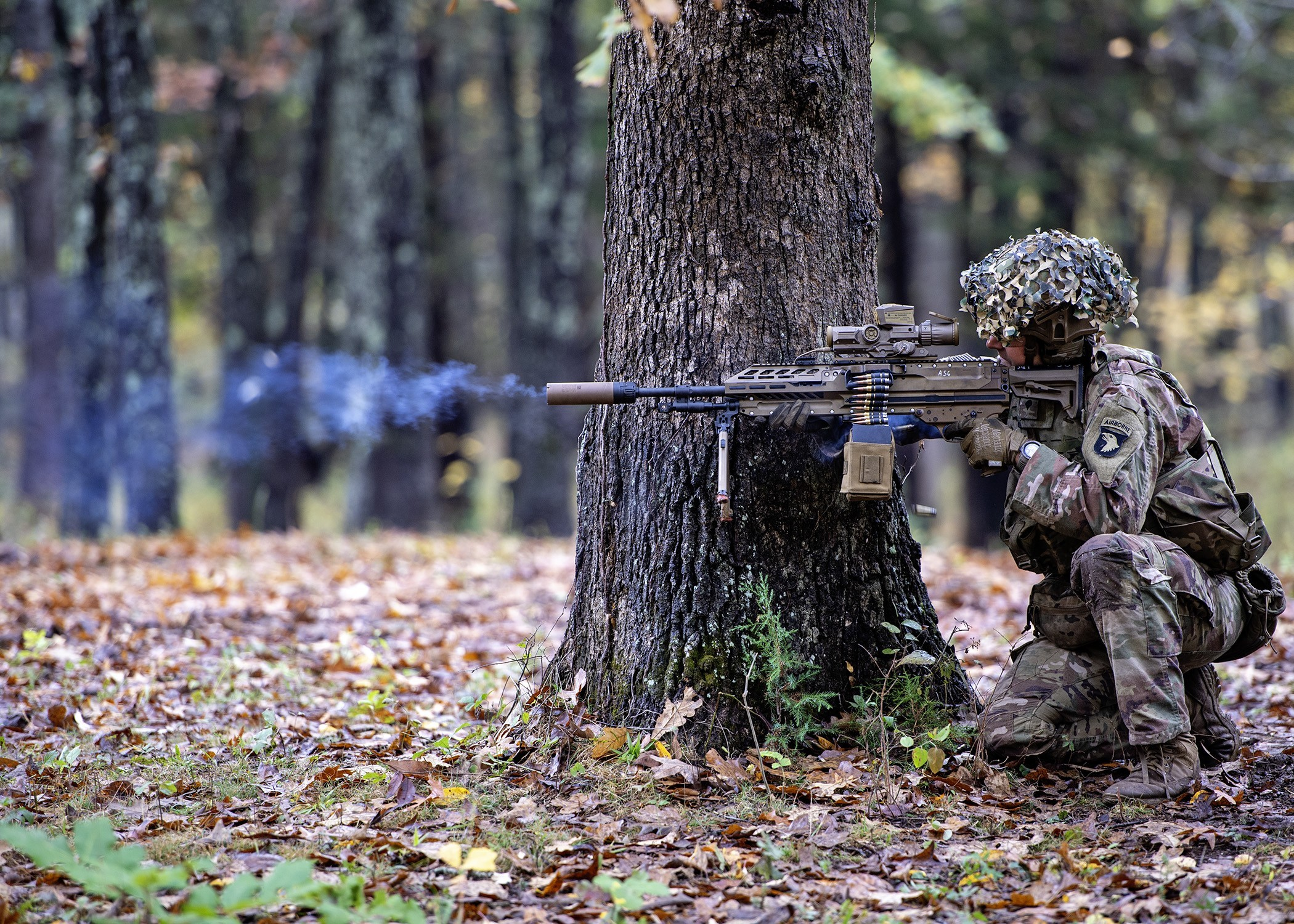
U.S. infantryman from the 2nd Battalion of the 502nd Infantry Regiment firing an XM250, 2023

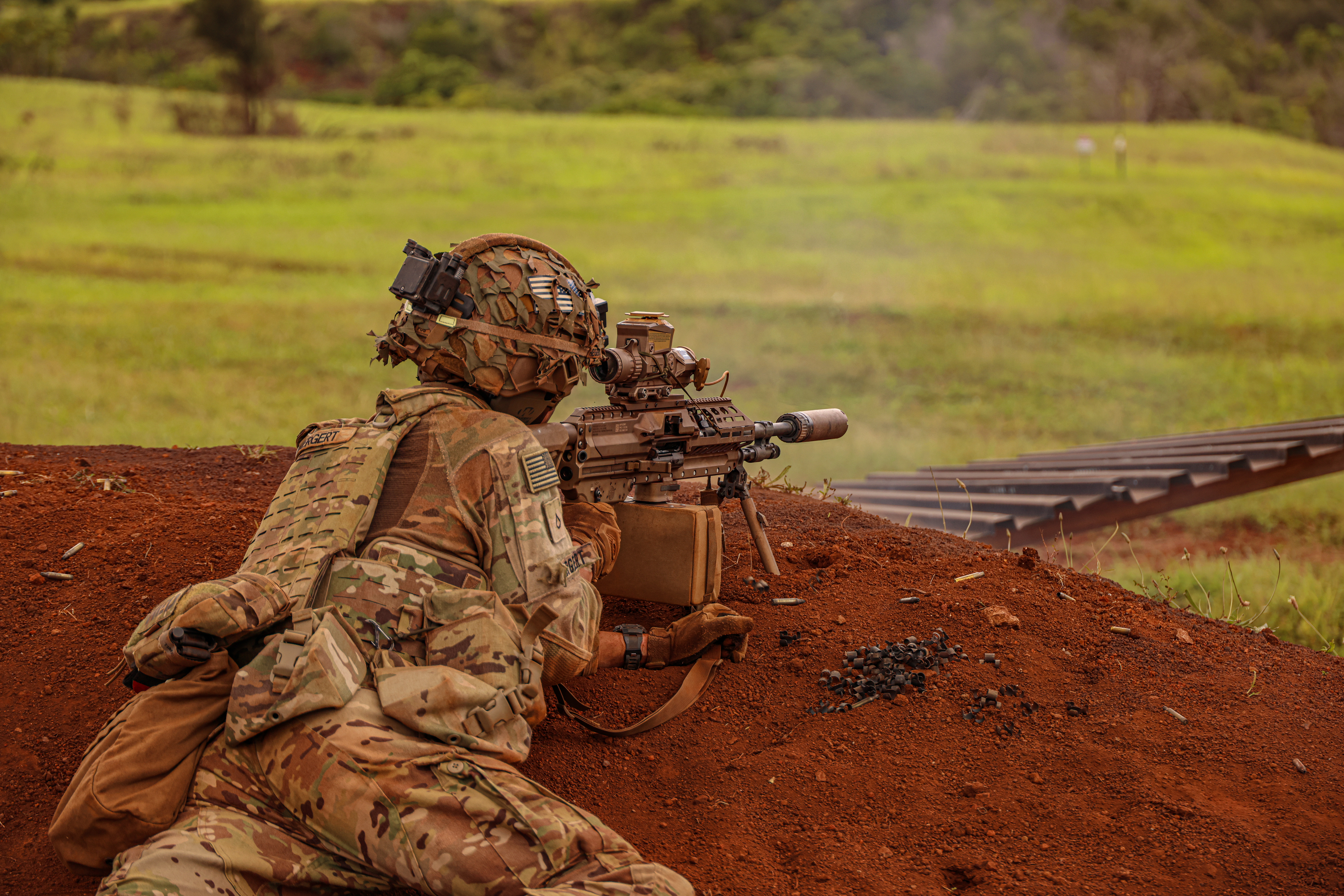
U.S. infantryman firing an M250 with the M157 fire-control system, 2025

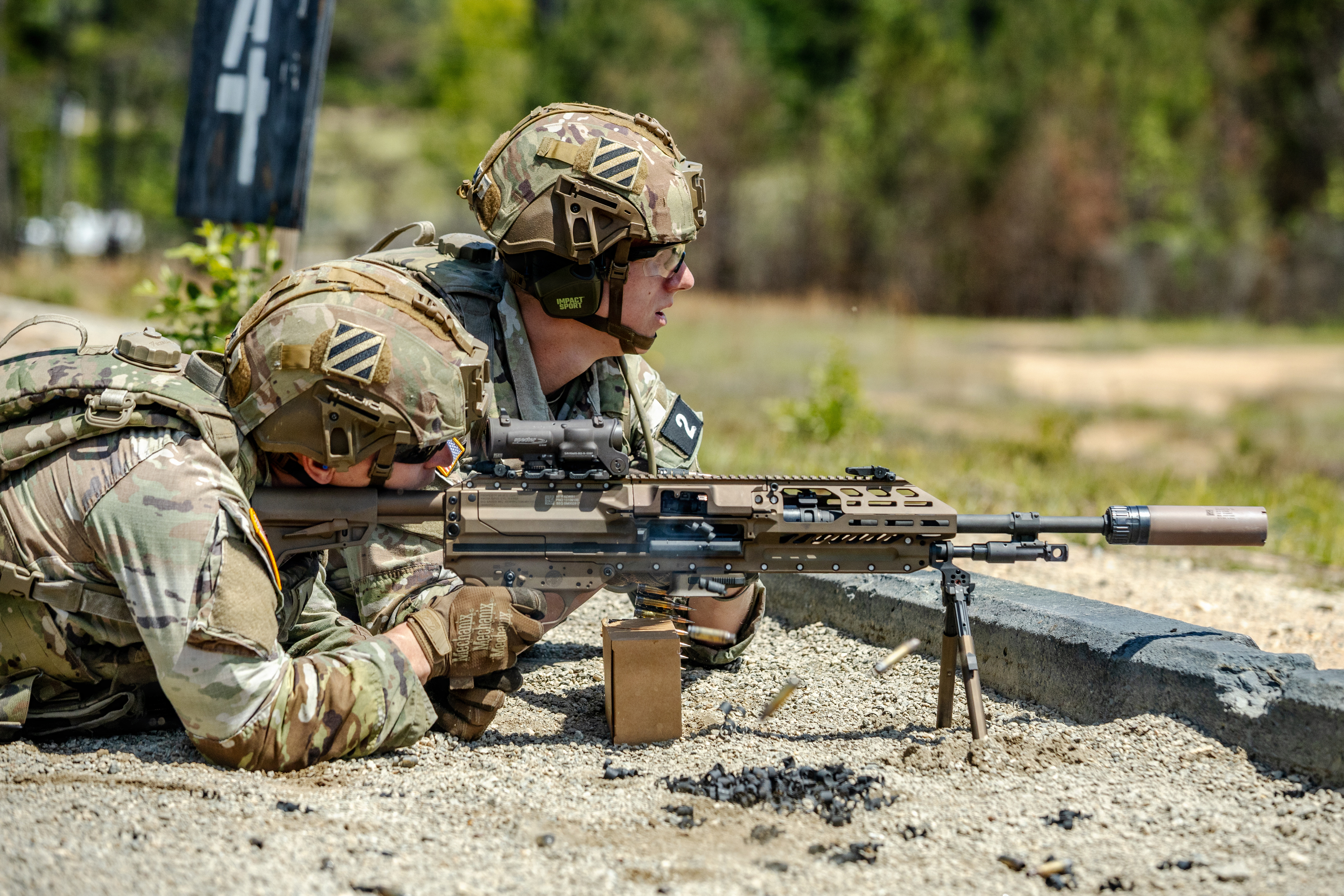
U.S. infantryman with an M250 at the 2026 Best Mortar Competition

== Users ==
Mexican Marine firing a SIG LMG in 7.62 mm NATO during joint live-fire range, Kaneohe Bay Hawaii, 2026

- Israel: Israel Defense Forces adopted the SIG LMG-7.62 variant in 2025.
- Mexico: SIG LMG-7.62 is used by Mexican Naval Infantry Corps.
- Thailand: SIG LMG-7.62 is used by Royal Thai Police Marine Police Division.
- Turkmenistan: Seen on display during the 35th Independence Day parade.
- United States: Used by the United States Army.

== See also ==
- IWI Negev
- LSAT light machine gun
- True Velocity RM338
