= Next Generation Squad Weapon =

U.S. military program to develop small arms

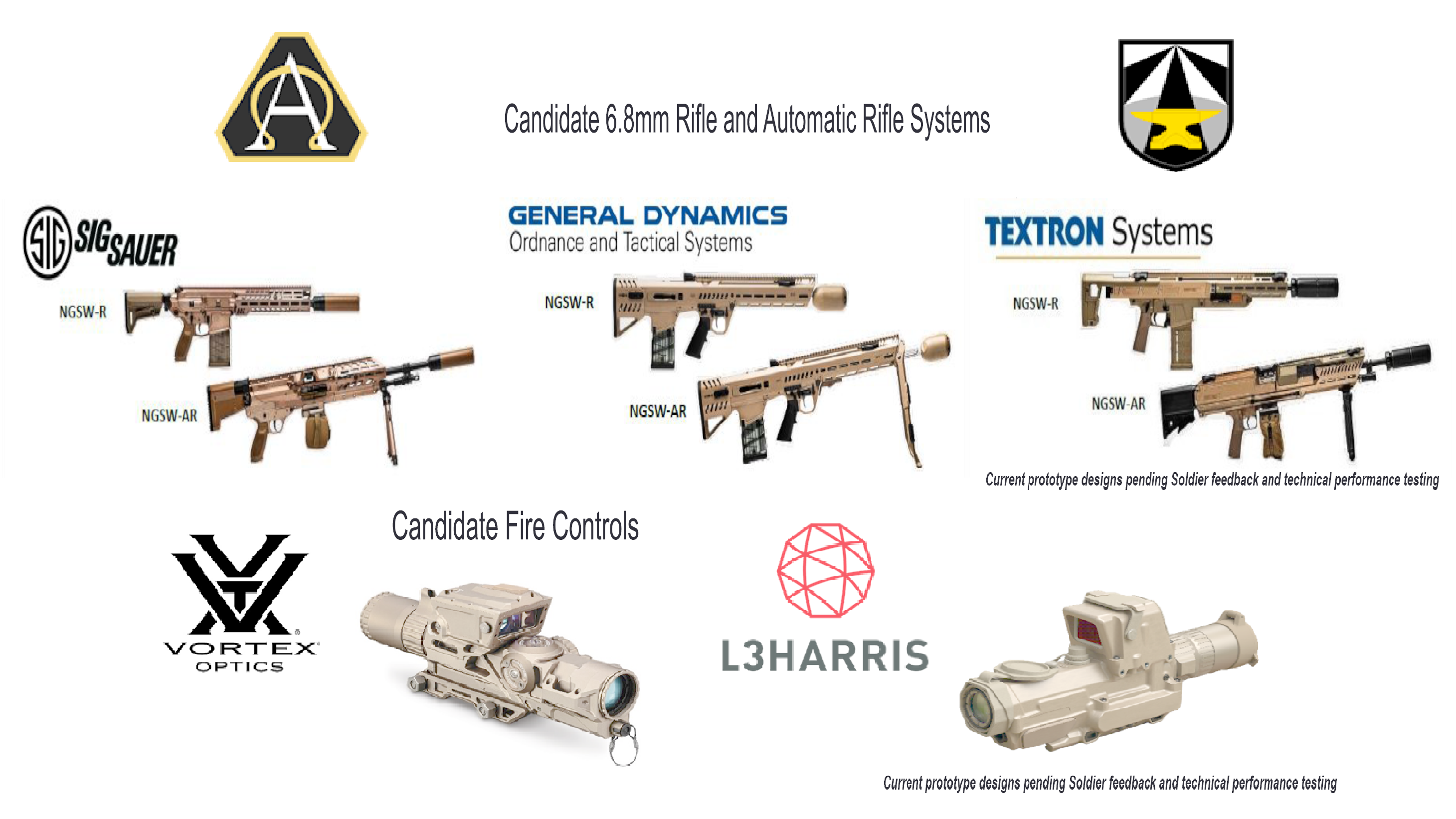
A U.S. Army graphic detailing the competitors for the program as of December 2020.

The Next Generation Squad Weapon (NGSW) program is a United States military program created in 2017 by the U.S. Army to replace the 5.56mm M4 carbine, the M249 SAW light machine gun, and the 7.62mm M240 machine gun, with a common system of 6.8mm cartridges and to develop small arms fire-control systems for the new weapons.

Seven defense manufacturers competed in the program, with five attempting to design and produce the weapons and two attempting to create and supply fire-control optics. The winners were officially announced by the Army in early 2022: SIG Sauer to produce the XM7 rifle and XM250 automatic rifle, Vortex Optics to produce the XM157 fire-control system, and Winchester to produce the custom 6.8×51mm Common Cartridge ammunition designed by SIG Sauer. The program was expected to cost $10 million in the first year of production, and $150 million the next.

== History ==
The NGSW program began in 2017, after the U.S. Congress issued an order for the U.S. Army to conduct an assessment regarding the need to upgrade existing M4 carbines with SOCOM's SOPMOD free-floating rail. It was concluded that the M4 carbine was still favored by troops and also performed well under stress. Feeding issues and other problems were fixed by using different ammunition types and magazines. Despite this, the M4 had difficulty penetrating the types of bulletproof vests used by Russian and Chinese troops, especially at longer ranges. Pressure to develop a new weapon system also arose from military programs created by other countries, such as Russia's Ratnik program. The U.S. Army's Soldier Enhancement Program released its findings in December 2017, which recommended proceeding with the Next Generation Squad Weapon Program as a more cost-effective solution compared to only retrofitting M4s with free-float rail systems.

Previous attempts to replace the M4 failed due to lack of funding, poor submissions, or re-evaluation of tactics and requirements. These included the Objective Individual Combat Weapon program, the Special Purpose Individual Weapon program, and the Advanced Combat Rifle program (not to be confused with the Adaptive Combat Rifle).

== Program components ==
=== Weapons ===
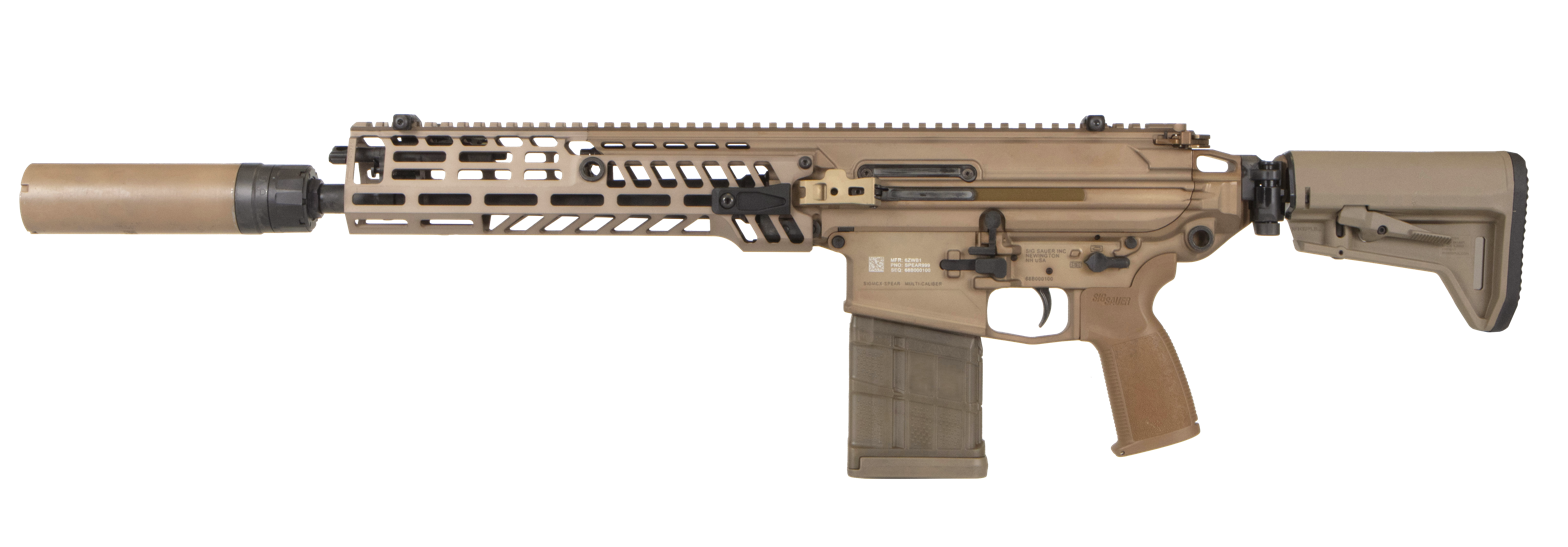
The SIG M7, the winning assault rifle submission for the NGSW program

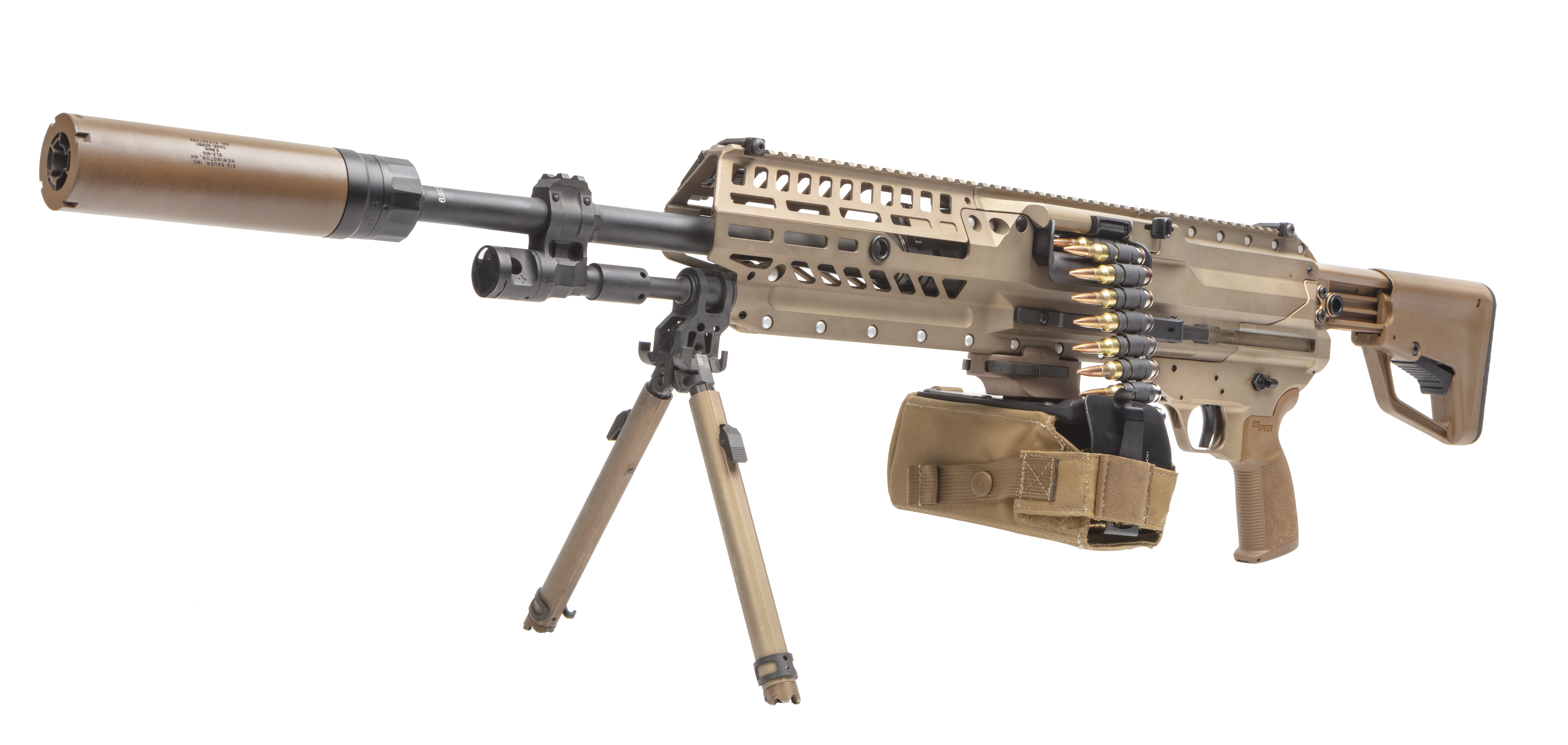
The SIG M250, the winning automatic rifle with inserted ammunition belt

In 2017, the U.S. Army issued requirements for prototype Next Generation Squad Weapon submissions. The program's rifle requirement, referred to as NGSW-R, was required to use a 6.8mm round and be able to utilize small arms fire-control systems. The program's support weapon, referred to as NGSW-AR, was required to be no longer than 35 in (890 mm); no heavier than 12 lb (5.4 kg) including attachments; able to suppress targets out to 3,900 ft (1,200 m); able to accurately fire on targets out to 2,000 ft (610 m); able to make use of small arms fire-control systems.

On April 19, 2022, after 27 months of prototyping and evaluation, the Army announced that SIG Sauer was awarded the NGSW program contract, and would produce the replacements for the M4 carbine and M249 SAW for the next 10 years. The new rifle, designated the XM7, is based on the company's SIG MCX Spear rifle, while the new automatic rifle, designated the XM250, is based on the company's SIG MG 6.8mm belt-fed gun.

The company was awarded a small initial production order, worth $10.4 million, for about 25 rifles, 15 automatic rifles, and a “large quantity” of ammunition so the weapons could be tested and the production line fine-tuned.

A U.S. Army press release stated the new weapons would "provide significant capability improvements in accuracy, range and overall lethality. They are lightweight, fire more lethal ammunition, mitigate recoil, provide improved barrel performance, and include integrated muzzle sound and flash reduction."

The U.S. Army intends to procure 111,428 M7 Rifles, 13,334 M250 Machine Guns, and 124,749 Fire Control systems through the life of the program.

Selected:

- SIG Sauer: SIG MCX SPEAR rifle (M7) and SIG LMG 6.8 (M250) belt-fed machine gun with custom 6.8×51 SIG FURY brass-steel hybrid cartridges.

Down-selected but rejected:

Three manufacturers were down-selected for the final phase of testing, including the ultimately selected SIG Sauer; the other two selected were:

- LoneStar Future Weapons and Beretta USA: RM-277R bullpup rifle and RM-277AR machine gun with True Velocity .277 TVCM polymer-cased cartridges. (Originally General Dynamics-OTS and Beretta, until GD handed over to LoneStar Future Weapons.)
- Textron Systems: Textron CT System rifle and LSAT light machine gun with Olin Winchester CT 6.8mm polymer-cased telescoped cartridges.

Rejected:

- PCP Tactical: Desert Tech MDR rifle and machine gun with PCP Ammunition 6.8mm polymer case-metal cartridges.
- FN-America: HAMR rifle and EVOLYS machine gun with Federal Cartridge Company 6.8mm cartridges.
- VK Integrated Systems: XR-68 rifle and machine gun with Bachstein Consulting 6.8mm cartridges.
- Cobalt Kinetics: MARS Inc. rifle and machine gun with Cobalt Kinetics 6.8mm cartridges.

=== Fire-control systems ===
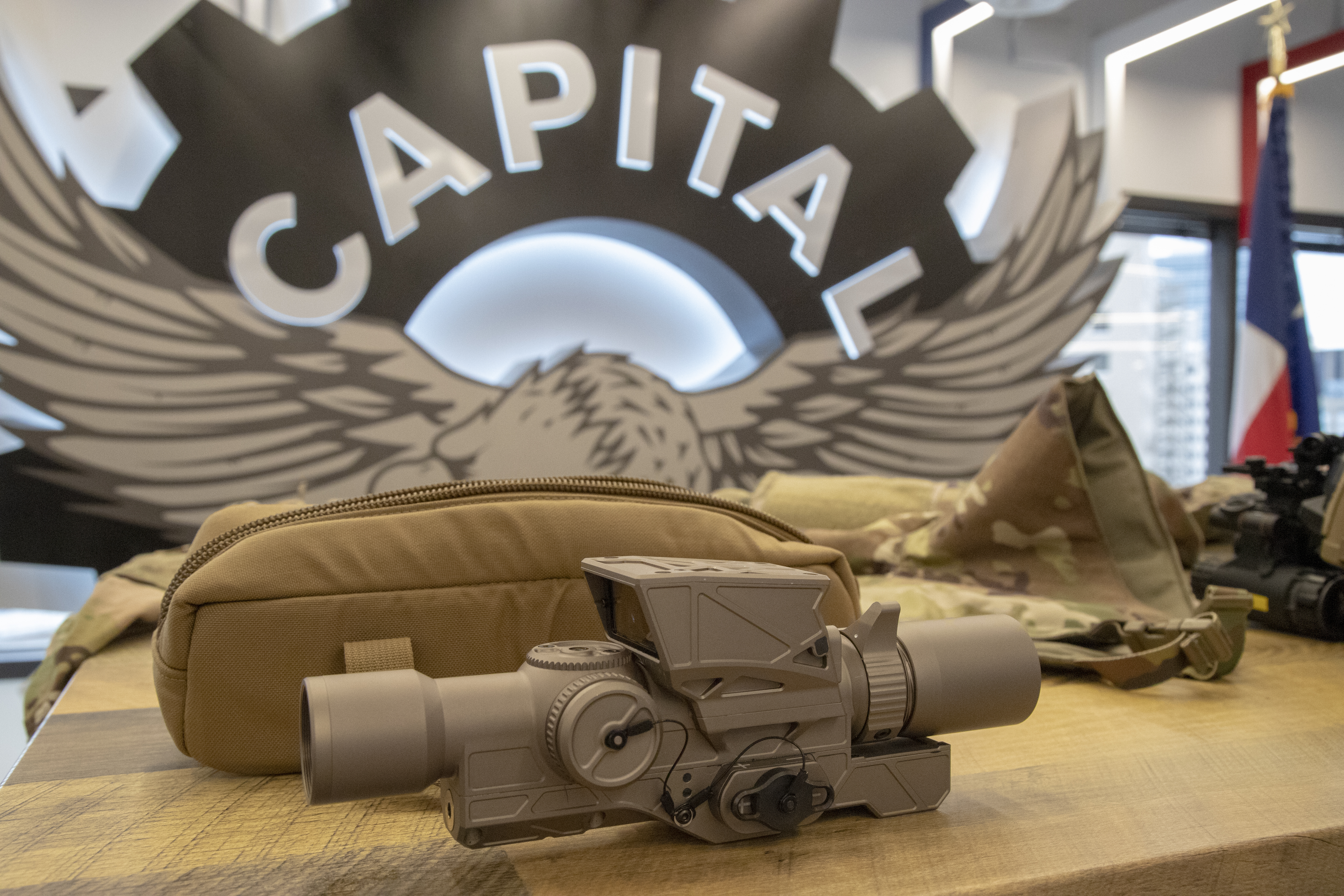
Vortex Optics XM157 platform agnostic fire-control system

The program also included the development of new fire-control systems for small-arms weapons. Two companies entered the competition: Vortex Optics and L3Harris Technologies, both of whose submissions utilized integrated fire-control systems using laser rangefinders, direct view optics, digital overlays, and ballistic calculation systems, as per NGSW program requirements. In late January 2022, the U.S. Army selected Vortex Optics' offering, designated the XM157 fire-control system.

=== Ammunition ===
NGSW weapon proposals used proponent designed cartridges with government-issued 6.8mm general-purpose projectiles. This allowed each proposed weapon and cartridge to be designed together to meet the performance requirements. In January 2022, Winchester was awarded a contract to produce the ammunition. In April 2022, with the selection of the MCX Spear, SIG Sauer's hybrid metal cartridge would become the new cartridge subsequently referred to as 6.8x51mm Common Cartridge by the U.S. Army.

== See also ==
- Ratnik (program)
- Special Purpose Individual Weapon
- Advanced Combat Rifle
- Objective Individual Combat Weapon
- Individual Carbine
- List of equipment of the United States Army
- List of individual weapons of the U.S. Armed Forces
- List of crew-served weapons of the U.S. Armed Forces
