= M7 rifle =

U.S. Army's NGSW rifle

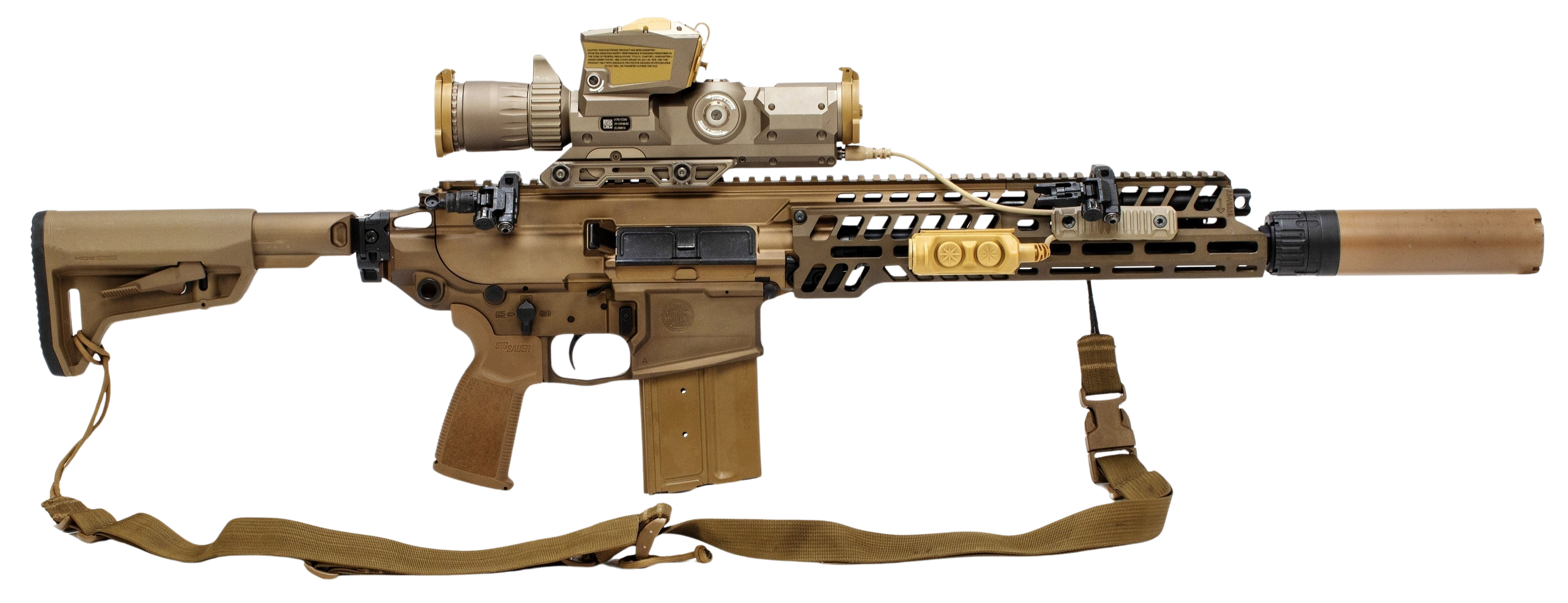
- U.S. Army 6.8mm rifle, M7 with M157 fire control optic
- Type: Assault rifle; Battle rifle; Carbine (M8)
- Place of origin: United States

Service history
- In service: 2022–present
- Used by: See Users

Production history
- Designed: 2019
- Manufacturer: SIG Sauer
- Variants: See Variants

Specifications
- Mass: 8.38 lb (3.80 kg); M7 with suppressor: 9.84 lb (4.46 kg); M7 PIE: 7.6 lb (3.4 kg); M8: 7.3 lb (3.3 kg); M8 with suppressor: 8.8 lb (4 kg)
- Length: M7 with suppressor: 36 in (914 mm); M8 with suppressor: 32.79 in (833 mm)
- Barrel length: 13.5 in (343 mm); M8: 10.5 in (267 mm)
- Cartridge: 6.8×51mm Common Cartridge (.277 Fury)
- Action: Short-stroke gas-operated piston system, rotating bolt
- Muzzle velocity: 915 m/s (3,000 ft/s)
- Feed system: 20-, 25-round SR-25 pattern magazines

The M7 rifle, formerly designated the XM7 and originally the XM5, is the U.S. Army's designation for the SIG MCX-SPEAR chambered in 6.8×51mm Common Cartridge (.277 Fury), designed by SIG Sauer for the Next Generation Squad Weapon (NGSW) program in 2022 to replace the M4 carbine.

The M7 features a short-stroke gas-operated piston system, a free-floating reinforced M-LOK handguard for direct accessory attachment to slotted hole mounting points, and uses SR-25 pattern magazines. It was fielded beginning in March 2024.

== History ==
In January 2019, the United States Army began the Next Generation Squad Weapon program to find replacements for the M4 carbine and M249 Squad Automatic Weapon. In September 2019, SIG Sauer submitted its designs. The SIG MCX-SPEAR (the rifle's commercial designation) chambered in .277 Fury (later designated as the "6.8 Common Cartridge" after Army acceptance) in response to concerns that improvements in body armor would diminish the effectiveness of calibers such as 5.56×45mm NATO (for the M4A1 and M249 SAW) and 7.62×51mm NATO (for the M240).

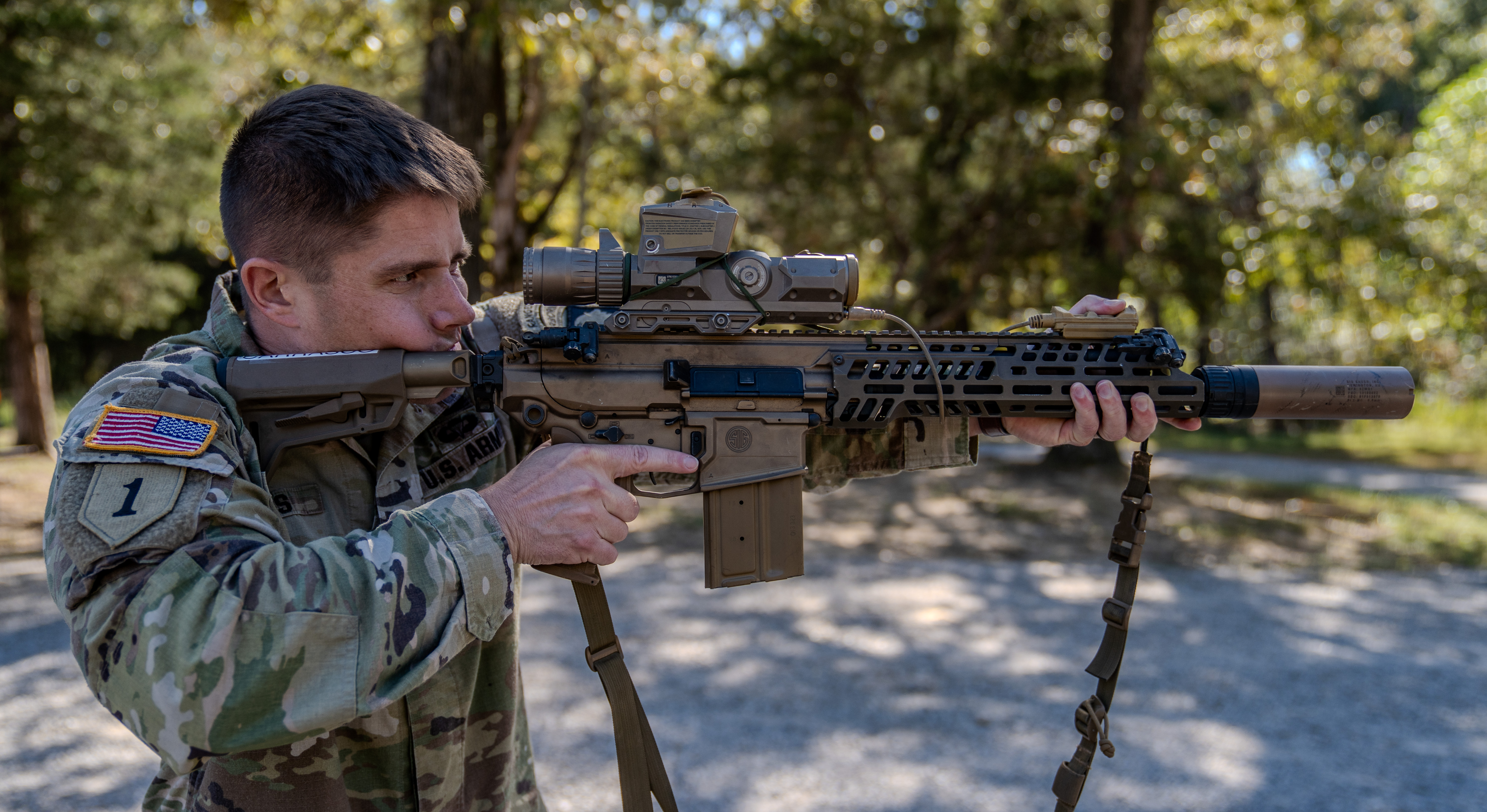
U.S. Army soldier with an M7 rifle during a situational training and live-fire exercises at Fort Campbell, 2024

In April 2022, the Army awarded a ten-year contract to SIG Sauer to produce the M7 rifle, and the M250 light machine gun, to replace the M4 carbine and M249 Squad Automatic Weapon, respectively. The rifle was originally designated as the XM5, continuing the numerical sequence from the M4 carbine it is set to replace. In January 2023, the Army changed the name of the rifle from the XM5 to the XM7, to avoid a trademark conflict with the Colt M5 carbine.

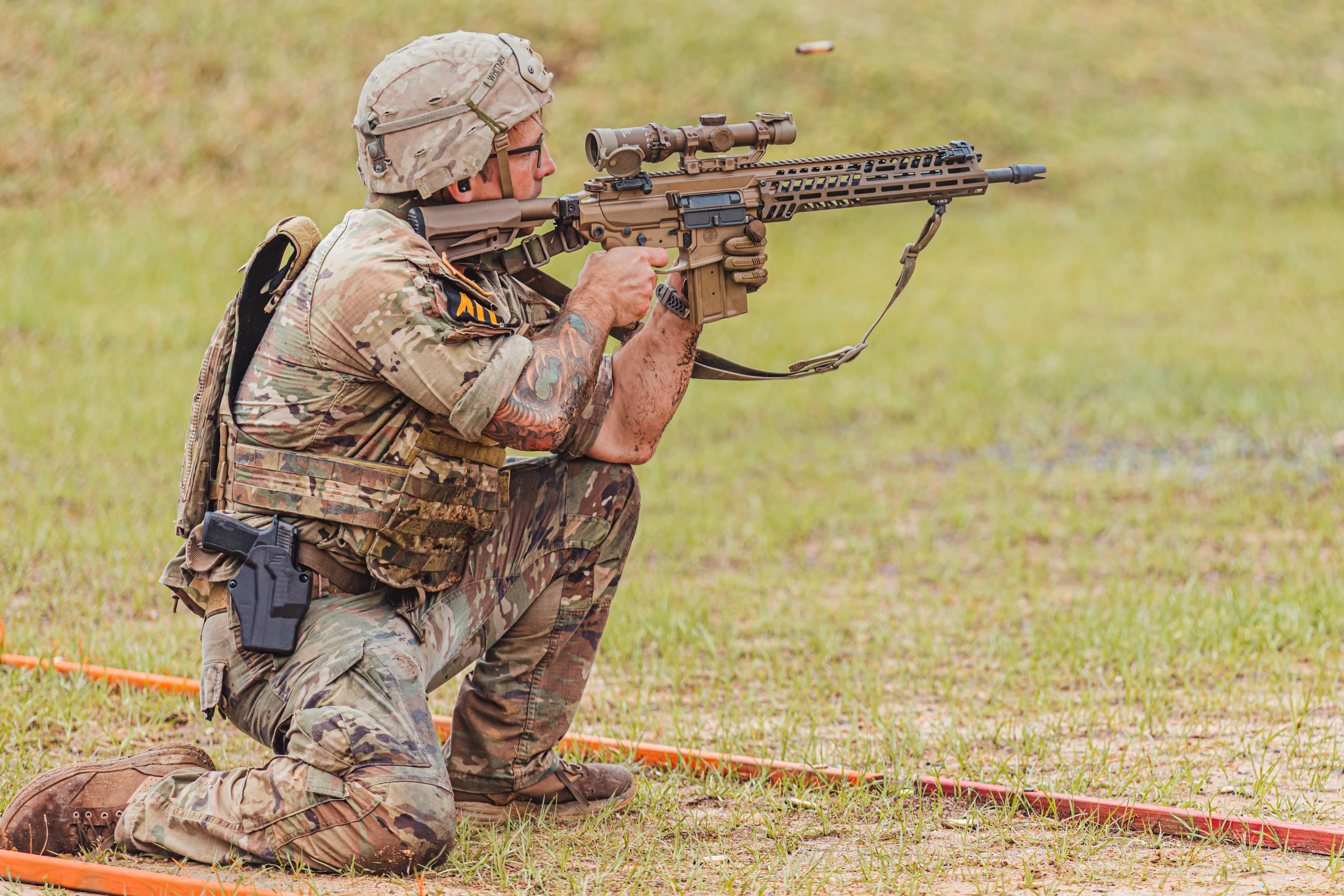
U.S. Army soldier with an M7 rifle at the 2025 Best Ranger Competition

The first batch of 25 XM7 rifles and 15 XM250 light machine guns were planned for delivery in late 2023. The Army may order 107,000 rifles and 13,000 light machine guns over the next decade for close combat forces, including infantry, cavalry scouts, combat engineers, forward observers, and combat medics. There are no current plans to issue the XM7 and XM250 to non-close combat soldiers. The contract does have the option to build additional XM7 rifles and XM250 light machine guns should the U.S. Marine Corps and U.S. Special Operations Command choose to be included in the adoption.

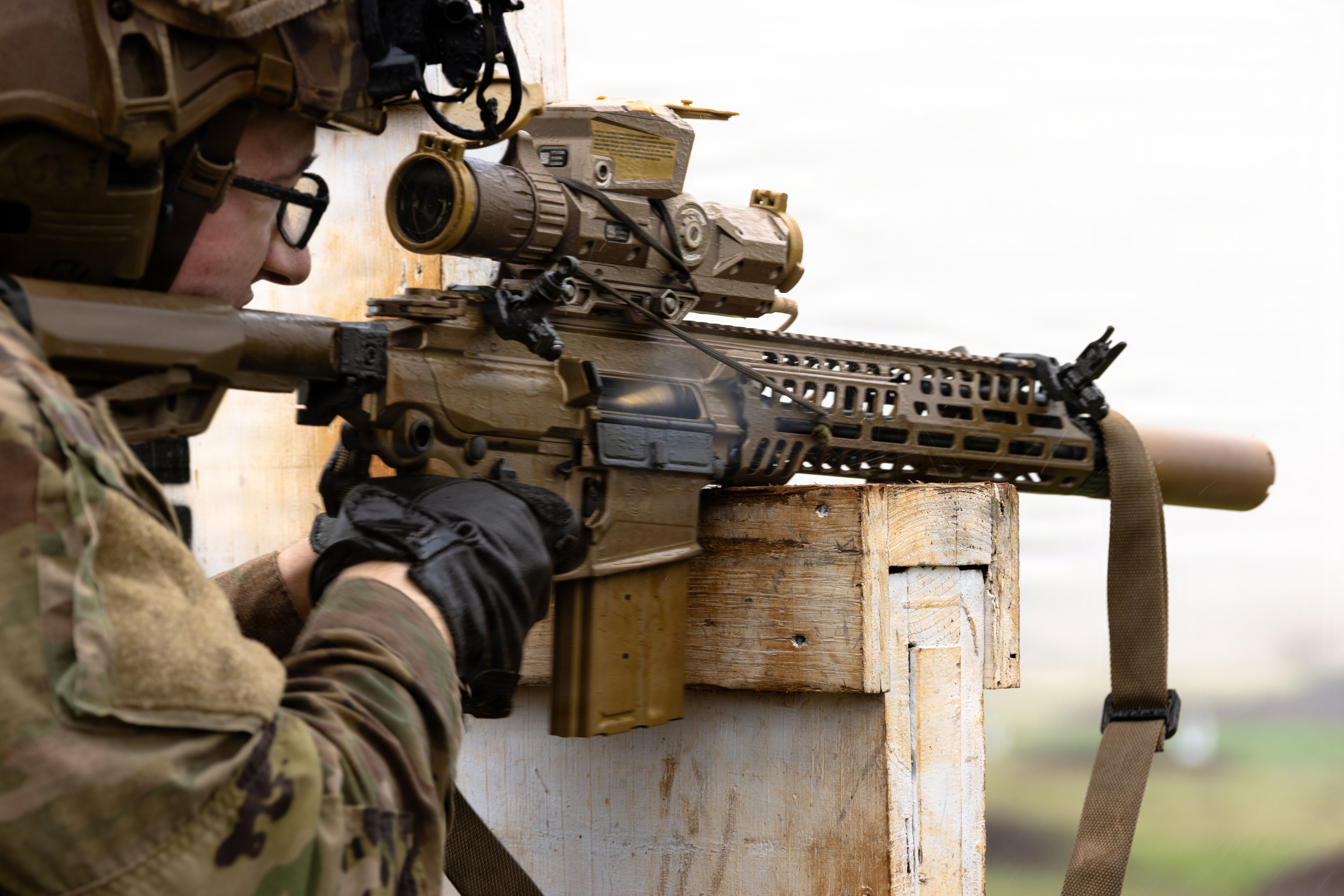
U.S. Army infantryman firing an M7 rifle with an M157 fire control optic

In September 2023, XM7 rifles were delivered to the 101st Airborne Division and 75th Ranger Regiment for user tests. Operational testing of the XM7 rifle, XM250 light machine gun, and XM157 Fire Control Optic was scheduled to begin in 2024, but widespread distribution was not assured. In March 2024, 1st Battalion, 506th Infantry Regiment of the 101st Airborne Division began fielding the XM7. In January 2026, the U.S. Army's 25th Infantry Division were trained with the M7 rifle.

In May 2025, the XM7 was type classified as the M7 rifle. The Type Classification confirms the system meets the U.S. Army's stringent standards for operational performance, safety, and sustainment.

In September 2025, SIG Sauer introduced an improved, lightened PIE M7 and an M7 carbine variant. U.S. Army officials are reviewing whether to field the standard-length PIE M7, adopt the shorter carbine variant as the new standard, or issue different configurations to different unit types. In December 2025, the U.S. Army decided to proceed with the procurement of the M7 carbine design, designating it as the XM8 carbine before it was later officially adopted as the M8 carbine.

== Design details ==
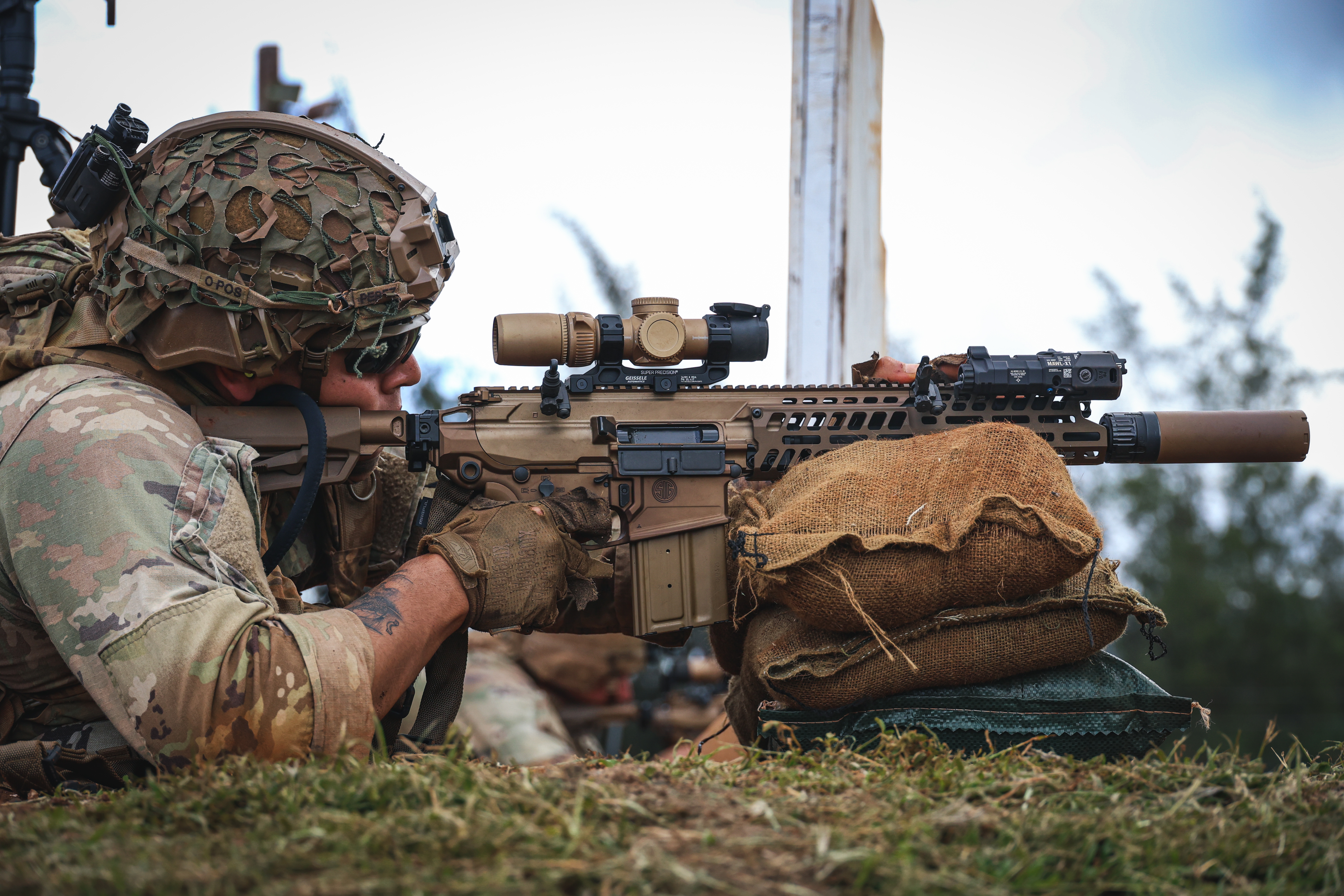
U.S. Army infantryman firing an M7 rifle with a Vortex "Eleanor" AMG 1-10×24 LPVO and a B.E. Meyers MAWL laser aiming module, 2026

The M7 rifle was developed for the 6.8×51mm Common Cartridge, offering greater lethality at longer ranges. To fully utilize its capabilities, it is paired with the M157 Fire Control optic, which integrates a laser rangefinder, ballistic calculator, and other technologies to increase accuracy. The M7 is the first U.S. Army service rifle to be issued with a suppressor as standard to reduce its firing signature. The original suppressor was 7 in (180 mm) long and weighed 1.46 lb (0.66 kg).

The M7 weighs 8.38 lb (3.80 kg), or 9.84 lb (4.46 kg) with a suppressor. It uses SR-25 pattern magazines that hold either 20 or 25 rounds in a detachable box magazine. The proposed combat ammunition load for each soldier will be 140 total rounds in seven 20-round magazines, in total weighing 9.8 lb (4.4 kg).

Compared to the M4A1 carbine weighing 6.34 lb (2.88 kg) unsuppressed, with a basic combat load of 210 rounds in seven 30-round magazines, in total weighing 7.4 lb (3.4 kg), the M7 rifle weighs about 2 lb (0.91 kg) more. Each soldier carries roughly a 4 lb (1.8 kg) heavier load with 70 fewer rounds.

== Variants ==
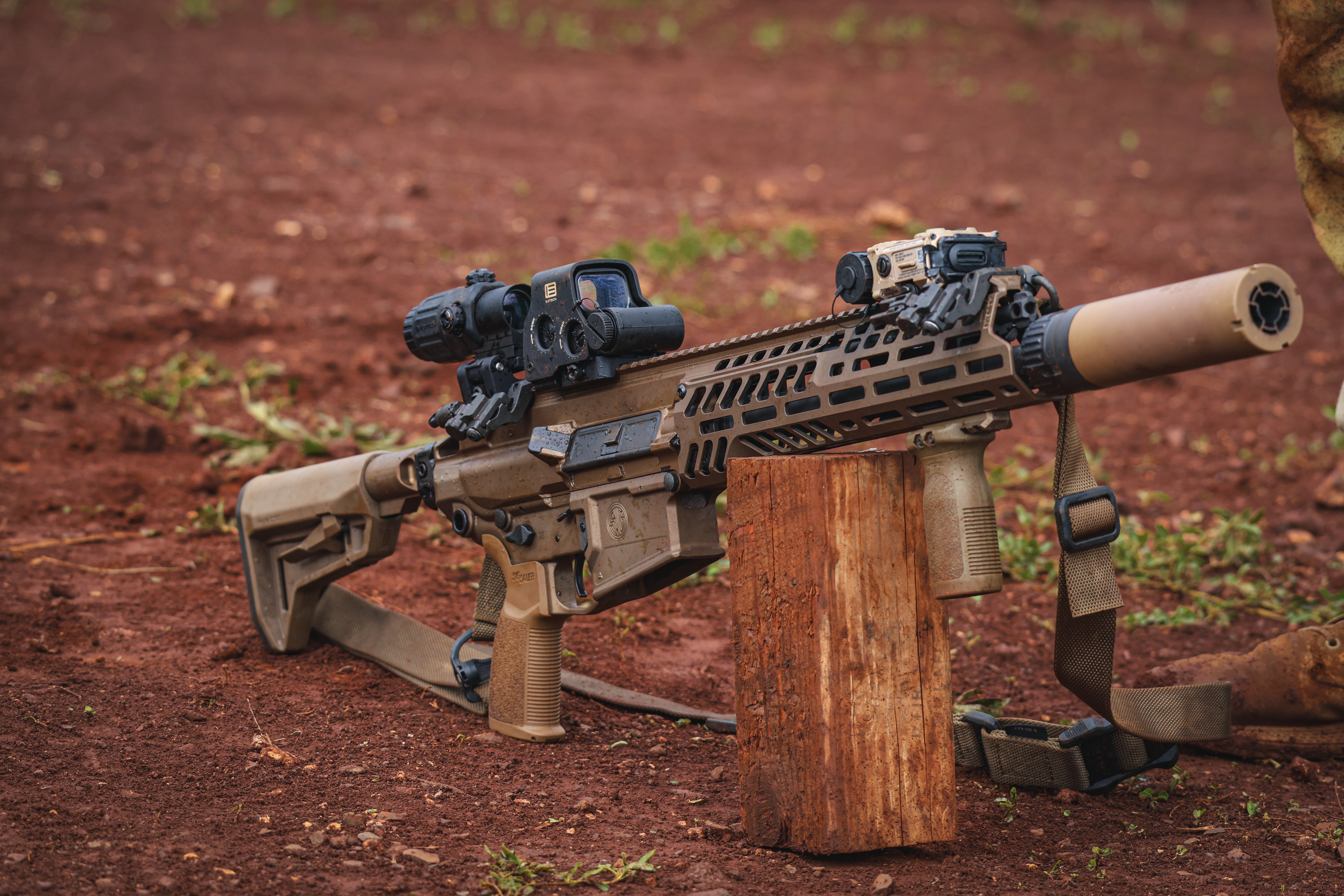
M7 rifle with an EOTech EXPS3 with G33 magnifier and an Envision RAIL laser aiming module

In October 2025, SIG Sauer displayed the PIE M7 (Product Improvement Effort) and M7 carbine at the Association of the United States Army (AUSA) Annual Meeting & Exposition. The PIE M7 variant has a 13.5 in (340 mm) barrel and has been lightened by approximately 0.7 lb (0.32 kg), from roughly 8.3 lb (3.8 kg) to about 7.6 lb (3.4 kg). The M7 carbine variant has a 10.5 in (270 mm) barrel and weighed about 7.3 lb (3.3 kg). These weights are reported as baseline figures, excluding any optical sight or suppressor. The weight reduction was achieved through a redesigned upper receiver, a slimmer barrel profile, lighter internal components, and removal of the folding stock hinge. The SLX suppressor was also shortened and paired with a new lightweight thermal shield, which delays the visible heat signature under night-vision and thermal optics until after roughly 100 rounds, rather than about 40 rounds without the thermal shield.

=== M8 carbine ===
M8 carbine with a fixed stock and improved SLX suppressor

SIG Sauer presented an improved carbine variant of the M7 rifle at Defence and Security Equipment International (DSEI) 2025. It is lighter and more compact than the original design, with a reported 10.5 in (270 mm) barrel instead of 13.5 in (340 mm), lightened internal parts, and a reprofiled handguard. It weighs approximately 7.5 lb (3.4 kg) unloaded, with a suppressor but without an optical sight, compared with about 9.84 lb (4.46 kg) for the M7. SIG Sauer reported that muzzle velocity with the shorter barrel is about 2,800–2,900 feet per second, a slight reduction from roughly 3,000 feet per second. The M7 carbine variant was later designated as the XM8 carbine, which is unrelated to the Heckler & Koch XM8. In April 2026, the U.S. Army accepted the first delivery of XM8 carbines from Sig Sauer. In October 2026, it was reported that the U.S. Army officially adopted it as the M8 carbine.

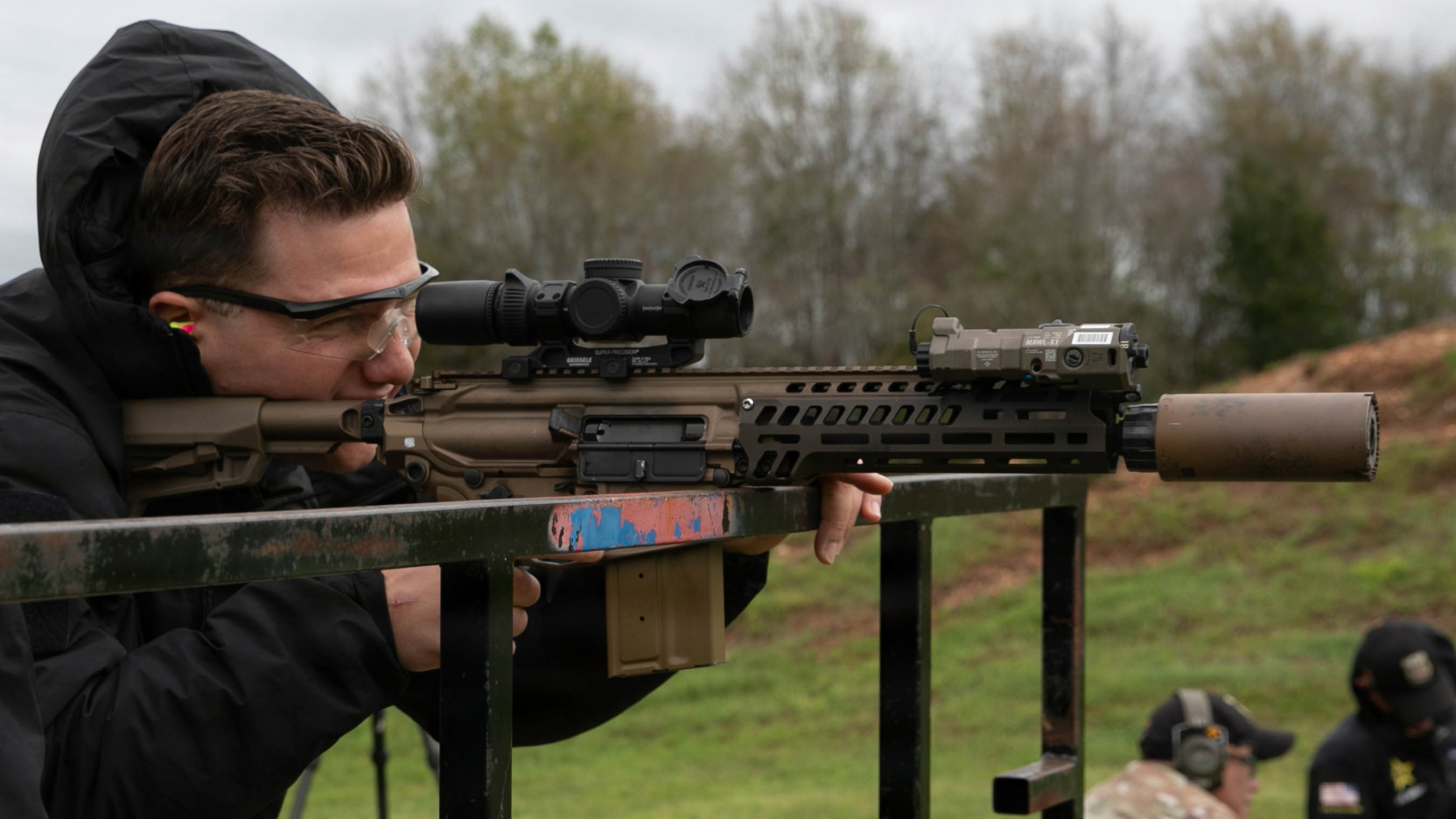
XM8 carbine demonstrated during familiarization training, 2026

The M8 carbine is a shortened and improved variant of the M7 rifle developed under the Next Generation Squad Weapon program. The carbine variant was introduced in response to soldier feedback calling for a lighter and more maneuverable rifle. The M8 is designed to improve mobility and adaptability across different operational environments while maintaining the performance and reliability standards of the M7 platform.

The M8 has a barrel length of 10.5 in (270 mm) and an overall length of approximately 32.79 in (833 mm) with the stock collapsed and suppressor attached. It weighs about 7.3 lb (3.3 kg) unloaded and 8.8 lb (4 kg) with the improved suppressor. Compared to the standard M7 rifle, the M8 is approximately 3.5 in (89 mm) shorter and more than 1 lb (0.45 kg) lighter, with the same weight as a loaded M4A1 carbine with a sling. It is supported by ongoing NGSW product improvements, including the introduction of 25-round magazines as standard, lighter ammunition to increase soldier load capacity, a redesigned suppressor with heat shield that has a reduced length of 6 in (150 mm) and weighs 1.31 lb (0.59 kg), alternate optics, and enhancements to the M157 fire control system to create target reference points and request for fire support with greater precision.

== Users ==
- Turkmenistan: Seen on display during the 35th Independence Day parade.
- United States: Used by the United States Army.

== See also ==
- FN SCAR-H
- Heckler & Koch HK417
- IWI ACE
- MKE MPT
- Zastava M19
