= .277 Fury =

6.8×51mm rifle cartridge by SIG Sauer

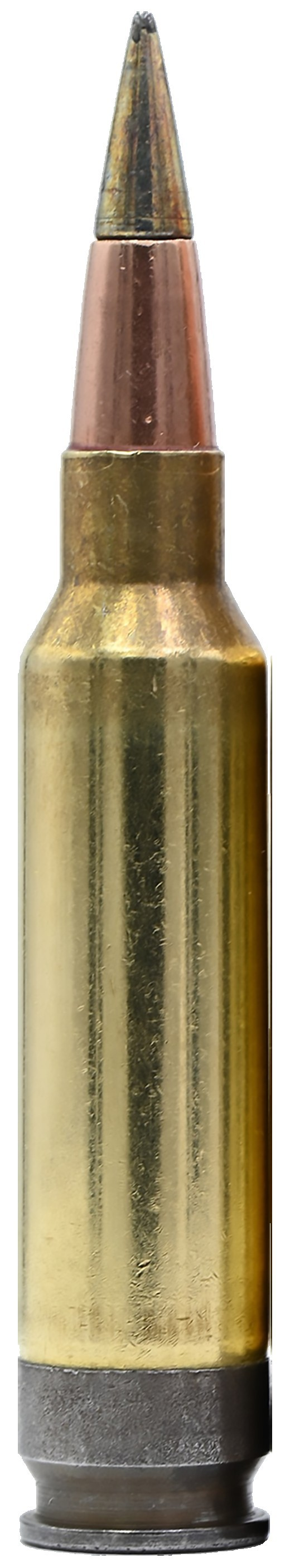
- XM1186 General Purpose
- Type: Centerfire rifle
- Place of origin: United States

Production history
- Designed: 2019
- Manufacturer: SIG Sauer
- Produced: 2019–present

Specifications
- Case type: Rimless, bottleneck
- Bullet diameter: .2780 in (7.06 mm)
- Land diameter: .2700 in (6.86 mm)
- Neck diameter: .3100 in (7.87 mm)
- Shoulder diameter: .4611 in (11.71 mm)
- Base diameter: .4703 in (11.95 mm)
- Rim diameter: .4720 in (11.99 mm)
- Rim thickness: .0540 in (1.37 mm)
- Case length: 2.015 in (51.2 mm)
- Overall length: 2.825 in (71.8 mm)
- Rifling twist: 1 in 7 inches (180 mm)
- Maximum pressure (SAAMI): 80,000 psi (550 MPa)

Ballistic performance
Bullet mass/type	Velocity	Energy
113 gr (7 g) Hybrid Ball	3,200 ft/s (980 m/s)	2,569 ft⋅lbf (3,483 J)
135 gr (9 g) Brass Elite Ball	2,750 ft/s (840 m/s)	2,267 ft⋅lbf (3,074 J)
135 gr (9 g) Hybrid Match	3,000 ft/s (910 m/s)	2,694 ft⋅lbf (3,653 J)
140 gr (9 g) Hybrid Hunting	2,950 ft/s (900 m/s)	2,706 ft⋅lbf (3,669 J)
155 gr (10 g) Hybrid Match	3,000 ft/s (910 m/s)	3,097 ft⋅lbf (4,199 J)
- Test barrel length: 16 inch (406 mm) and 24 inch (610 mm) for 155gr Hybrid Match; Source

The .277 Fury or 6.8×51mm Common Cartridge (designated as the .277 SIG Fury by SAAMI) is a centerfire, rimless, bottlenecked rifle cartridge announced by SIG Sauer in late 2019. Its hybrid, three-piece cartridge case has a steel case-head and brass body connected by an aluminum locking washer to support the high chamber pressure of 80,000 psi (550 MPa).

== Background ==
The cartridge was designed by SIG Sauer for the United States Army's Next Generation Squad Weapon Program (NGSW). It is dimensionally similar to the 7.62×51mm NATO service cartridge.

In December 2019, the cartridge was announced for non-military usage, along with the SIG Sauer CROSS bolt-action rifle. As a short-action rifle cartridge (cartridges having an overall length of 2.750 inches (69.85 mm) or less), increased internal ballistic performance for its cartridge-case volume is accomplished by applying high gas-pressure. In 2020, it was accepted by the Sporting Arms and Ammunition Manufacturers' Institute (SAAMI) as a new rifle cartridge and chambering. In 2022, SIG Sauer announced that it intends to commercially chamber the SIG MCX Spear semi-automatic rifle in .277 Fury.

== Specifications ==
The cartridge uses a case that is the same length and diameter as the .308 Winchester. It has a very high chamber pressure (maximum average pressure, MAP) of 80,000 psi (550 MPa) in the SAAMI standard. It also means that the .277 Fury is normally chambered in small arms that are capable of handling the accompanying bolt thrust safely.

The SAAMI warns that MAP levels greater than 65,000 psi (450 MPa) may present an increased risk of unsafe cartridge case or firearm rupture and thus will require new cartridge case and firearm designs that depart from traditional manufacturing practices, including the use of materials, construction methods, production lines, and other important design criteria. On ammunition intended to exceed 65,000 psi (450 MPa), SIG uses a "hybrid" cartridge case design. Each "hybrid" case consists of a stainless steel base coupled to a brass body via an aluminium locking washer. Stainless steel has a significantly higher yield strength than brass, allowing the use of higher maximum average pressure (MAP) chamber-pressure levels.

The higher MAP enables a 135-grain (8.7 g) projectile to achieve a muzzle velocity of 3,000 feet per second (910 m/s) from a 16-inch (406 mm) barrel, compared to 2,750 feet per second (840 m/s) for a 135-grain projectile in a brass-case reduced-power "practice" load.

== Ammunition types ==
SIG's commercial catalogue contains both high-power loads using a hybrid cartridge and reduced-power "practice" loads using a brass cartridge. Commercial types include:

- 113-grain (7.32 g) hybrid ball (solid copper) described as "Next Gen Ammunition, Magnum Performance", G1 ballistic coefficient (BC) of 0.330. SIG describes this ammunition as the one developed for the US Next Generation Weapon Systems. Only available in 460-round cans or 920-round crates, unlike the others, which are sold as 20-round boxes.
- 135-grain (8.75 g) brass elite ball described as "Elite Match Grade FMJ Ammunition", G1 BC of 0.475. Reduced-power load classified as "practice".
- Discontinued 135-grain (8.75 g) hybrid "match grade", G1 BC ≈ 0.488. Same published G1 BC as Sierra .277 135-grain (8.75 g) HPBT MatchKing.
- Discontinued 140-grain (9.07 g) hybrid "hunter tipped", G1 BC of 0.508. Same published G1 BC as Sierra .277 140-grain (9.07 g) TGK GameKing.
- 150-grain (9.72 g) hybrid hunter described as "featuring NOSLER Accubond bonded core bullets", G1 BC of 0.500.
- 155-grain (10.04 g) hybrid match described as "featuring Sierra MatchKing HPBT bullet", G1 BC of 0.549.

Do note that ballistic coefficients are somewhat debatable.

== Performance ==
SIG Sauer claims that the cartridge has performance superior to the 6.5mm Creedmoor, exhibiting 6 to 9 feet (1.8 to 2.7 m) less bullet drop at 1,000 yards (914 m), while delivering 20 to 25 percent greater energy.

== US Army award and designation as 6.8 common cartridge ==
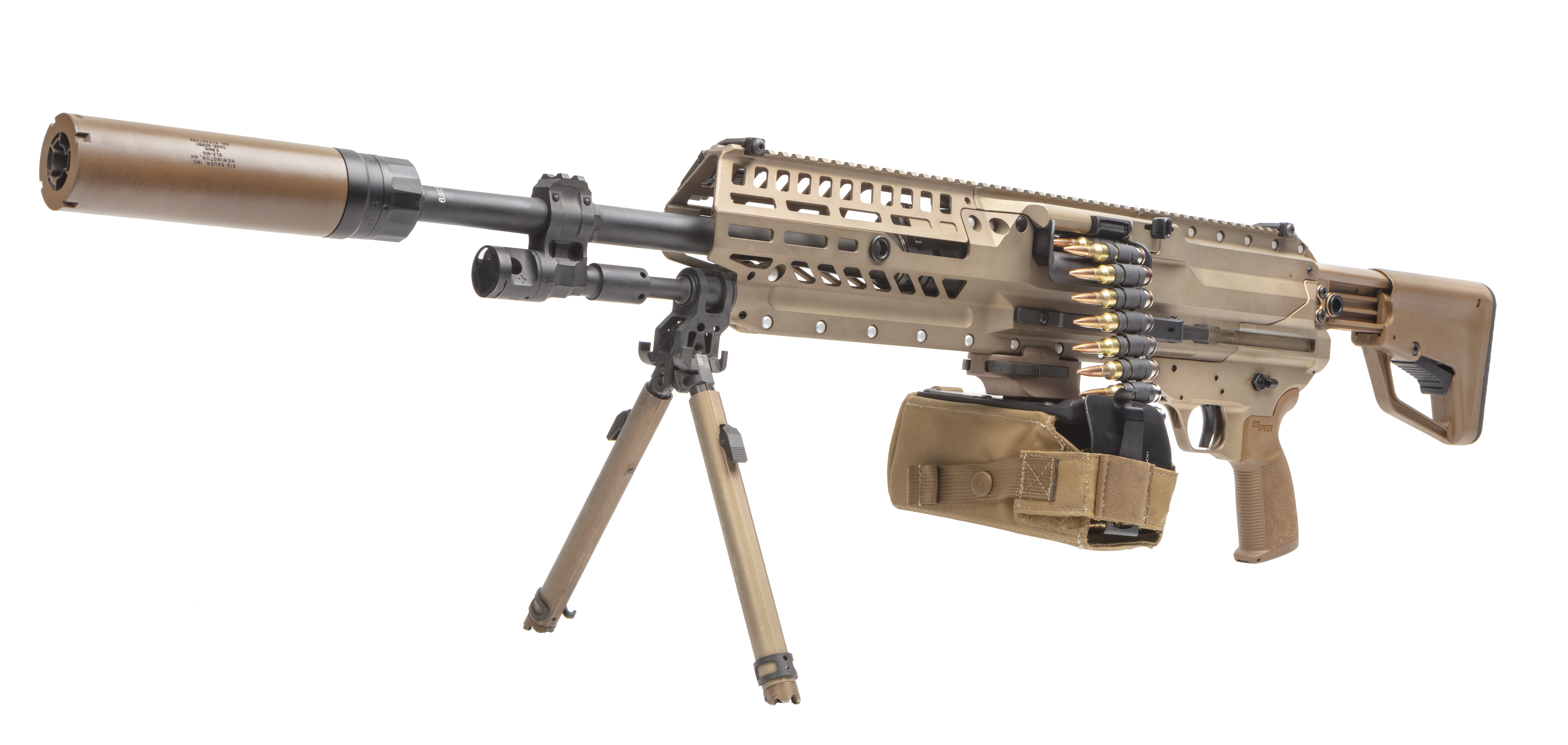
An XM250 automatic rifle with inserted ammunition belt

In January 2019, the United States Army began the Next Generation Squad Weapon Program to find replacements for the M4 carbine and M249 light machine gun. On April 19, 2022, the United States Army announced that it had selected SIG Sauer to build the M7 rifle to partly replace the M4 carbine, while the M250 automatic rifle was to replace the M249 SAW in the LMG role. In both cases, it had selected the company's Fury ammunition, using government-provided projectiles and vendor-designed cartridges for the new weapon.

The M7 was designed to fire the 6.8×51mm SIG Fury cartridge in response to concerns that improvements in body armor would diminish the effectiveness of the 5.56×45mm NATO round used in the M4 carbine and M249 SAW and increase their lethality and effective ranges compared to common, battlefield rounds such as the 5.56×45mm NATO and 7.62×51mm NATO.

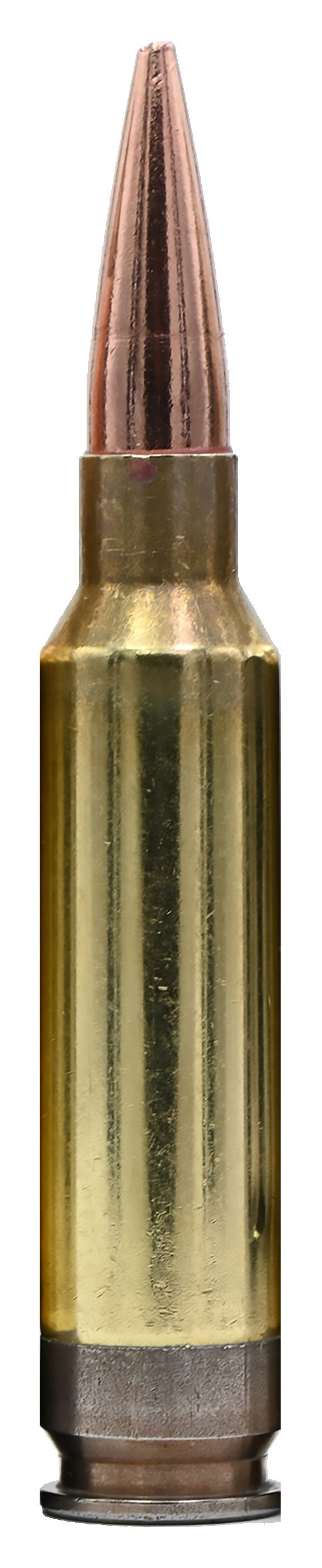
XM1188 Reduced Range

Operational testing of the M7 rifle, XM250 automatic rifle, XM157 fire-control optic-platform unit, and the 6.8×51mm ammunition squad-weaponry was expected to begin in 2024. However, this did not guarantee an actual, widespread following issue. The military designation for this round is 6.8 common cartridge. The XM1186 is the general-purpose 6.8 mm round, with other versions including reduced-range rounds so that weapons chambered in 6.8 mm can fire on existing ranges designed for the 5.56 mm, marking rounds for force-on-force shooting, and blank and tracer rounds.

=== US Army solicitation ===
As of March 2022, the United States Army has an ongoing solicitation for an M240 machine gun 6.8×51mm conversion kit for the 7.62×51mm NATO-chambered M240B and M240L general-purpose machine guns.

=== US ammunition types ===
- XM1168 General Purpose (Prototype)
- XM1184 Special Purpose.
- XM1186 General Purpose. Hybrid.
- XM1188 Reduced Range. Hybrid.
- XM1192 Blank.
