= List of assault rifles =

Assault rifles are full-length, select fire rifles that are chambered for an intermediate-power rifle cartridge that use a detachable magazine. Assault rifles are currently the standard service rifles in most modern militaries. Some rifles listed below, such as the AR-15, also come in semi-automatic models that would not belong under the term "assault rifle".

== Definition ==
By strict definition, a firearm must have the following characteristics to be considered an assault rifle:

- It must be an individual weapon;
- It must be capable of selective fire, which means it has the capacity to switch between semi-automatic and burst/fully automatic fire;
- It must have an intermediate-power cartridge: more power than a pistol but less than a standard rifle or battle rifle. For full-power automatic rifles, see List of battle rifles;
- Its ammunition must be supplied from a detachable box magazine;
- It should have an effective range of at least 300 metres (330 yards).

Rifles that meet most of these criteria, but not all, are technically not assault rifles, despite frequently being called such.

For example:

- Select-fire Amogh carbines are not assault rifles; their effective range is only 200 yards.
- Select-fire rifles such as the FN FAL are not assault rifles; they are battle rifles and fire full-powered rifle cartridges.
- Select-fire rifles such as the Joint Venture Protective Carbine are not assault rifles; as their cartridge is too weak.
- Fully-automatic-only rifles like the M231 Firing Port Weapon are not assault rifles; they do not have select-fire capabilities. In contrast, the original ArmaLite AR-15 would meet the criteria.
- Select-fire rifles with fixed magazines like the Cei-Rigotti are not assault rifles; they do not have detachable box magazines.

Several of the rifles on the below list have non-assault rifle variants. Because they lack the selective fire capability as they only fire semi-automatic even though it fulfills the other requirements of the definition above.

== List ==
Name	Manufacturer	Image	Cartridge	Manufacturing country	Serial production	Production
9A-91	KBP Instrument Design Bureau		9x39mm	Russia	yes	1994-present
80.002	TsNIITochMash		5.45×39mm	Soviet Union	no	1975-1979
701 rifle	208th Research Institute		7.62×39mm	China	no	1966-1972 (prototypes only)
A-91	KBP Instrument Design Bureau		7.62×39mm 5.45×39mm 5.56×45mm	Russia	yes	1991-present
AAC Honey Badger	Advanced Armament Corporation		.300 AAC Blackout	United States		2011
AAI ACR	AAI Corporation		5.56×45mm sub-calibre flechette	United States	no	1989
AC-556	Sturm, Ruger & Co.		.223 Remington	United States	yes	1979-1999
ACAR	Lithgow Arms; Wedgetail Industries; Thales Australia		5.56×45mm.300 AAC Blackout	Australia		2023
Adaptive Combat Rifle	Remington Arms; Bushmaster		5.56×45mm 6.8mm Remington SPC	United States	yes	2010-2020
Adcor A-556	Adcor Defense		5.56×45mm	United States	yes	2010-2020
ADS	KBP Instrument Design Bureau		5.45×39mm 5.45×39mm PSP	Russia		2007
AICW	Defence Science and Technology Organisation Metal Storm Tenix Defence Systems		5.56×45mm	Australia		2001-2006
AEK-971	Degtyarev plant		5.45×39mm	Soviet Union		1990–present (designed 1978)
AG-043			5.45×39mm	Soviet Union	no	1974
AK-9	Kalashnikov Concern		9×39mm	Russia		c.2007-?
AK12/AK200 AK15 AK19 AK201, AK202, AK204 AK203 AK205	Kalashnikov Concern		5.45×39mm 5.56×45mm 7.62×39mm	Russia	yes	2010
AK-47	Kalashnikov Concern		7.62×39mm	Soviet Union	yes	1948–present
AK-63	Fegyver- és Gépgyár		7.62×39mm	Hungary	yes	1977
AK-74	Kalashnikov Concern		5.45×39mm	Soviet Union	yes	1974-1991 (AK-74); 1991–present (AK-74M)
AK-100 rifle family AK-101 AK-102 AK-103 AK-104 AK-105	Kalashnikov Concern		5.45×39mm 5.56×45mm 7.62×39mm	Russia	yes	c. 1994–present
AK-107	Kalashnikov Concern		5.45×39mm 5.56×45mm	Russia	yes	1990s
AK Alfa	Command Arms and Accessories		5.45×39mm 7.62×39mm 5.56×45mm.308 Winchester; 9×19mm Parabellum	Israel	yes	2016-present
AKM	Izhmash; Tula Arms Plant		7.62×39mm	Soviet Union	yes	1959-1977 (USSR)
AKS-74U	Tula Arms Plant		5.45×39mm	Soviet Union	yes	1979-1993
AL-7	Izhmash		5.45×39mm	Soviet Union		1970s
AMD-65	Fegyver- és Gépgyár		7.62×39mm	Hungary	yes	1965-1985
AMP-69	Fegyver- és Gépgyár		7.62×39mm	Hungary		1970–1985
AN-94	Izhmash		5.45×39mm	Russia	yes	1994-2006
AM-17	Kalashnikov Concern		5.45x39mm	Russia		2015
AMB-17	Kalashnikov Concern		9x39mm	Russia		2015
AO-27 rifle			7.62 mm (3 mm flechette)	Soviet Union	no	1961
AO-35 assault rifle			5.45×39mm 7.62×39mm	Soviet Union	no	1968?
AO-38 assault rifle	TsNIITochMash		5.45×39mm	Soviet Union	no	1965
AO-46 (firearm)	TsNIITochMash		5.45×39mm	Soviet Union	no	1969
AO-63 assault rifle	TsNIITochMash		5.45×39mm	Soviet Union	no	1984
AOR M21	AOR		5.56×45mm	Greece	yes	2020-Present
APS-95	Končar-Arma d.o.o		5.56×45mm	Croatia		1995
APS underwater rifle	Tula Arms Plant; TsNIITochMash		5.66×39mm	Soviet Union	yes	1975–present
AR-M1	Arsenal AD		5.56×45mm 7.62×39mm	Bulgaria	yes	1998-present
ArmaLite AR-15 Colt AR-15	Armalite Colt		5.56×45mm.223 Remington	United States	yes	1959-1964 (Armalite) 1964–present (Colt)
ArmaLite AR-18	ArmaLite		5.56×45mm	United States	yes	1969-1985
ArmaLite AR-100	ArmaLite		5.56×45mm	United States		
Armtech C30R	Armtech Ltd		5.56×45mm (Quadrant with 3.56g standard M193 bullet, dimensions of the rectangular ammunition 35.7×15.8×9.5 mm)	Australia		1986
AS-44			7.62×39mm	Soviet Union	no	1944
AS Val	TsNIITochMash		9×39mm	Soviet Union	yes	1987–present
ASH-78	Gramësh		7.62x39mm	Albania	yes	1978-1993
ASM-DT amphibious rifle	Tula Arms Plant		5.45×39mm	Soviet Union	no	1990s
AT-44	Fedor Tokarev		7.62×41mm	Soviet Union	no	1944
Automatkarbin 5	Förenade Fabriksverken		5.56×45mm	Sweden	yes	1986–present
Barrett REC7 Barrett M468	Barrett Firearms Manufacturing		5.56×45mm 6.8mm Remington SPC	United States		2007
Bendix Hyde carbine	Bendix Corporation		.30 Carbine	United States	no	1941
Beretta AR70/223	Fabbrica d'Armi Pietro Beretta		5.56×45mm	Italy	yes	1972-1990
Beretta AR70/90	Fabbrica d'Armi Pietro Beretta		5.56×45mm	Italy	yes	1990-?
Beretta ARX160	Fabbrica d'Armi Pietro Beretta		5.56×45mm 5.45×39mm 6.8mm Remington SPC; 7.62×39mm	Italy	yes	2008–present
BSA 28P	Birmingham Small Arms Company		.280 British	United Kingdom		1949
BSA Machine Carbine	Birmingham Small Arms Company		.30 Carbine	United Kingdom	no	1945
BR18	ST Kinetics		5.56×45mm 6.8mm Remington SPC; 7.62×39mm	Singapore		2018–present
Brügger & Thomet APC556	Brügger & Thomet		5.56×45mm	Switzerland	yes	2018-present
Burton LMR 1917	Winchester Repeating Arms Company		.345 Winchester Self-Loading	United States	no	1917 (prototype only)
Bushmaster M4 Type Carbine	Bushmaster Firearms International		.223 Remington; 5.56x45mm 6.8mm Remington SPC; 7.62×39mm	United States		1990s
C42	W+F Bern		6.45×48mm XPL Swiss	Switzerland	no	1978
CAR-15	Colt's Manufacturing Company		5.56×45mm.223 Remington	United States	yes	1966-present
CAR 816	Caracal International		5.56×45mm	United Arab Emirates	yes	2014-present
Carbon 15	Bushmaster Firearms International		5.56×45mm.223 Remington; 9×19mm Parabellum	United States		
Chropi rifle	Chropei		5.56×45mm 7.62×39mm	Greece	no	1975
CEAM Modèle 1950	Atelier Mécanique de Mulhouse		.30 Carbine; 7.92×33mm Kurz; 7.65×35mm 7.5×38mm	France	no	1949-1950 (prototypes only)
CETME Model L	CETME		5.56×45mm	Spain	yes	1986-1991
Colt 933	Colt's Manufacturing Company		5.56×45mm	United States	yes	1995-present
Colt ACR	Colt's Manufacturing Company		5.56×45mm (M855 or Duplex)	United States	no	1982
Colt Advanced Piston Carbine	Colt's Manufacturing Company		5.56×45mm	United States	yes	2010s-present
Colt Canada C7	Diemaco; Colt Canada		5.56×45mm	Canada		1982–present
Colt CM901	Colt Defense		5.56×45mm 6.8mm Remington SPC; 7.62×39mm	United States		c.2012–present
Colt MARS	Colt		5.56×30mm Mars	United States		1997
Conventional Multirole Combat Rifle	ST Kinetics		5.56×45mm	Singapore		2014
Cristóbal Carbine	Armería San Cristóbal Weapon Factory		.30 Carbine	Dominican Republic	yes	1950
CS/LR17	Norinco		5.56×45mm 7.62×39mm 7.62×51mm	China	yes	2016-present
CZ 805 BREN/BREN 2	Česká zbrojovka Uherský Brod		5.56×45mm 7.62×39mm	Czech Republic		2009–present (BREN); 2015–present (BREN 2)
CZ 805 BREN 3	Česká zbrojovka Uherský Brod		5.56×45mm.300 AAC Blackout	Czech Republic		2024–present
CZ 807	Česká zbrojovka Uherský Brod		7.62x39mm 5.56×45mm	Czech Republic		2013
ČZ 2000	Česká zbrojovka Uherský Brod		5.56×45mm	Czechoslovakia		1990 (prototypes only)
Daewoo K1	Daewoo Precision Industries/SNT Motiv		5.56×45mm	South Korea		1980–present
Daewoo K2	Daewoo Precision Industries/SNT Motiv		5.56×45mm.223 Remington	South Korea		1982–present
Desert Tech MDR	Desert Tech		.223 Remington; 5.56×45mm.308 Winchester; 7.62×51mm	United States		2014
Desert Tech WLVRN	Desert Tech		.223 Remington; 5.56×45mm.308 Winchester.300 AAC Blackout; 7.62×51mm 6.5mm Creedmoor	United States		2024-present
DI MA-1	Myanmar Directorate of Defense Industries/ Myanmar Fritz Werner Industries		5.56×45mm	Myanmar		2002-present
DI MA-1 Mk. III	Myanmar Directorate of Defense Industries		5.56×45mm	Myanmar		2012-present
Dlugov assault rifle			7.62×39mm	Soviet Union		1953
DRDO Close Quarter Battle carbine	Bharat Forge		5.56×45mm	India	yes	2026–present
DSAR-15	Dasan Machineries		5.56×45mm	South Korea		2021–present
EF88	Thales Australia		5.56×45mm	Australia		2016
EM-2 rifle	Royal Small Arms Factory; Enfield		7 mm Mk1Z (7×43mm)	United Kingdom		1948-1951 (pre-production prototypes only)
EMER-K1	Myanmar Fritz Werner Industries		5.56×45mm	Myanmar		1990s
Excalibur rifle	Armament Research and Development Establishment		5.56×45mm	India		2013–14
Fateh	Defense Industries Organization		5.56×45mm	Iran		2014
FAMAS	KNDS France		5.56×45mm	France	yes	F1: 1975-2000; G2: 1994-2000
FARA 83	Fabrica Militar de Armas Portatiles Domingo Matheu		5.56×45mm	Argentina		1984-1990
FAMAE SG 540-1	FAMAE		5.56×45mm	Chile	yes	1991–present
FB Beryl	Fabryka Broni "Łucznik" - Radom		5.56×45mm 7.62×39mm	Poland	yes	1997–present
FB Mini-Beryl	Fabryka Broni "Łucznik" - Radom		5.56×45mm	Poland	yes	1997-present
FB MSBS Grot	Fabryka Broni "Łucznik" - Radom		5.56×45mm 7.62×39mm	Poland	yes	2018–present (prototypes 2007–2017)
FB Onyks	Fabryka Broni "Łucznik" - Radom		5.45×39mm	Poland	no	1987-1990
FB Tantal	Fabryka Broni "Łucznik" - Radom		5.45×39mm	Poland	yes	1989-1994
FFV 890	Försvarets fabriksverk		5.56×45mm	Sweden	yes	1975-1980
Floro PDW	Floro International Corporation		5.56×45mm	Philippines		
CAL	Fabrique Nationale d'Herstal		5.56×45mm	Belgium		1966-1975
F2000	Fabrique Nationale d'Herstal		5.56×45mm	Belgium	yes	2001–present
FNC	Fabrique Nationale d'Herstal		5.56×45mm	Belgium	yes	1979-2004
FN SCAR	Fabrique Nationale d'Herstal		5.56×45mm 7.62×51mm	Belgium		2004–present
Fort-221	RPC Fort		5.45×39mm	Ukraine		?
Fusil Automático Doble	SIMA Electrónica		5.56×45mm	Peru	yes	2008-present
FX-05 Xiuhcoatl	Dirección General de Industria Militar del Ejército		5.56×45mm	Mexico	yes	2005–present
G13 carbine	STC Delta		5.56×45mm	Georgia		2012
GA Personal Defense Weapon	Government Arsenal		7.62×37mm Musang	Philippines		2011
Galil Córdova	Indumil		5.56×45mm	Colombia	yes	2015
Garand carbine	John Garand		.30 Carbine	United States	no	1941
Grad AR	State Factories-North Ossetia		6×49mm 5.45×39mm	South Ossetia		2010
Grossfuss Sturmgewehr	Grossfuss		7.92×33mm Kurz	Germany	no	1944
G11	Heckler & Koch		4.73×33mm	West Germany		K1: 1987-1989 (prototypes only); K2: 1990 (pre-production prototypes only)
G36	Heckler & Koch		5.56×45mm	Germany		1996–present
G41	Heckler & Koch		5.56×45mm	West Germany		1984-1996
Haenel MK 556	C.G. Haenel		5.56×45mm	Germany		
H&R Reising light rifle	Eugene Reising		.30 Carbine	United States	no	1941
HK32	Heckler & Koch		7.62×39mm	West Germany	no	1960s-1970s (prototypes only)
HK33	Heckler & Koch		5.56×45mm	West Germany	yes	1968-2000 (H&K); 1999–present (MKEK)
HK36	Heckler & Koch		4.6×36 mm	West Germany	no	Early 1970s (prototypes only)
HK416 M27 Infantry Automatic Rifle G95	Heckler & Koch		5.56×45mm	Germany Germany; United States Germany	yes	2004–present (HK416); 2010-present (M27 IAR); 2017-present (G95)
HK433	Heckler & Koch		5.56×45mm	Germany	yes	2017-?
Type 20	Howa		5.56×45mm	Japan		2020–present
Type 89	Howa		5.56×45mm	Japan		1989–present
VHS	HS Produkt		5.56×45mm	Croatia	yes	VHS:2005-?; VHS-2:2013–present
IA2	IMBEL		5.56×45mm	Brazil		2012–present
MD	IMBEL		5.56×45mm	Brazil		1985-?
MD97	IMBEL		5.56×45mm	Brazil		1997-?
Tipo Terni Mod. 1921			7.35×32mm	Italy	no	1921
IMI Galil	Israel Military Industries		5.56×45mm	Israel	yes	1972-1998
IWI ACE	Israel Weapons Industries		5.56×45mm 7.62×39mm	Israel		2008–present
IWI ARAD	Israel Weapons Industries		5.56×45mm	Israel		2019–present
IWI Carmel	Israel Weapons Industries		5.56×45mm	Israel		2019
IWI Tavor TAR21	Israel Weapons Industries		5.56×45mm	Israel	yes	c.2001/2002–present
IWI Tavor X95	Israel Weapons Industries		5.56×45mm 5.45×39mm.300 AAC Blackout; 5.56×30mm MINSAS	Israel	yes	c.2009–present
IWI Zion-15	IWI US		5.56×45mm	United States	yes	2020-present
IFAR 22	PT Republik Armamen Industri		5.56×45mm	Indonesia		2022
Ingram FBM	Fabrica Boliviana de Municiones		5.56×45mm	Bolivia		1990s
INSAS rifle	Ordnance Factories Board		5.56×45mm	India	yes	1994–present
Interdynamics MKR	Interdynamics		4.5×26mm MKR	Sweden		1980s
Interdynamics MKS	Interdynamics		5.56×45mm	Sweden		1979
K-3 (rifle)	Garni-ler		5.45×39mm	Armenia		1996
Kale KCR556	Kalekalıp		5.56×45mm	Turkey		2018-present
Kbk wz. 2002 BIN			5.56×45mm	Poland		2002
Kbkg wz. 1960			7.62×39mm	Polish People's Republic		1960
KH-2002 Khaybar	Defense Industries Organization		5.56×45mm	Iran		2003
Komodo Armament D5	Komodo Armament		5.56×45mm	Indonesia		2014(?)
KS-1 rifle	Knight's Armament Company		5.56×45mm	United States	yes	2022-present
L64/65	RSAF Enfield		4.85×49mm	United Kingdom	no	1972-1974; 1976-1978 (prototypes only)
L85 Rifle L22 Carbine	BAE Systems		5.56×45mm	United Kingdom	yes	1985-1994
La France M16K	La France Specialties		5.56×45mm.45 ACP	United States	yes	1982
LAPA FA-03	LAPA-Laboratorio de Pesquisa de Armamentos Automaticos, SC/Ltda		5.56×45mm	Brazil	no	1978-1983
Leader Dynamics Series T2 MK5	Leader Dynamics; Australian Automatic Arms		5.56×45mm	Australia		Late 1970s/early 1980s-1996
LICC IWS	FN Herstal		.264 IWS	United States; Belgium		2024
LF-58			.30 Carbine	Italy		1950s
LR-300	Z-M Weapons		5.56×45mm	United States		2000
LSAT rifle			LSAT caseless ammunition	United States		2008
LWRC M6	LWRC International		5.56×45mm	United States		2006–present
LMT R-20 Rahe	Lewis Machine & Tool Company		5.56×45mm	United States; Estonia		2019–present
M2 carbine M3 carbine	General Motors		.30 Carbine	United States	yes	1944 (M2 carbine); 1945 (M3 carbine)
M4 Advanced Colt Carbine-Monolithic Close Quarters Battle Receiver	Colt's Manufacturing Company		5.56×45mm	United States	yes	1987-present
M16	Colt Defense		5.56×45mm	United States	yes	1963–present?: Base model/Colt 604 (1963-1967); A1 (1967-?); A2 (circa 1983-?); A3 (circa 1996-present?); A4 (circa 1997–present?)
MPT-55	MKEK; Sarsılmaz Arms; Kalekalıp		5.56×45mm	Turkey		2017
Masaf rifle			5.56×45mm	Iran		2020
M4-WAC-47	Ukroboronprom; Aeroscraft		5.56×45mm 5.45×39mm 7.62×39mm	Ukraine; United States		2018
M1944 Hyde Carbine			.30 Carbine	United States	no	1944
MK 556	C.G. Haenel		5.56×45mm	Germany		2020
Magpul PDR	Magpul		5.56×45mm	United States	no	2006-2011
Malyuk	Krasyliv Assembly Manufacturing Plant		5.45×39mm 5.56×45mm 7.62×39mm	Ukraine		2015-present
Maschinenkarabiner 42(H)	Hugo Schmeisser		7.92×33mm Kurz	Nazi Germany	no	1942
Maschinenkarabiner 42(W)	Walther		7.92×33mm Kurz	Nazi Germany	no	1942
Misr assault rifle	Factory 54, Maadi Company for Engineering Industries		7.62x39mm	Egypt		1959-present
MN.2	Nederlandse Wapen en Munitie Fabriek		5.56x45mm	Netherlands		1970s
Modular Ambidextrous Rifle System	Lewis Machine & Tool Company		5.56x45mm	United States		2015-present
MR-C	Crye Associates		6.8mm Caseless	United States	no	2005
Multi Caliber Individual Weapon System	Ordnance Factory Tiruchirappalli		5.56×45mm 7.62×39mm 6.8mm Remington SPC	India		2012
Nesterov assault rifle			7.62×39mm	Soviet Union		1961
Norinco CQ	Norinco		5.56×45mm	China	yes	1980s-present
Norinco Type 86S	Norinco		7.62×39mm	China		1980s
OTs-12 Tiss	KBP Instrument Design Bureau		9×39mm	Russia		1993-?
OTs-14 Groza	TsKIB SOO		9×39mm 7.62×39mm	Russia		1992-1999
PAPOP	KNDS France		5.56×45mm	France		1995
Pindad SS1	Pindad		5.56×45mm	Indonesia	yes	1991–present
Pindad SS2	Pindad		5.56×45mm	Indonesia	yes	2005–present
Pindad SS Bullpup	Pindad		5.56×45mm	Indonesia	no	2006 (Prototypes only)
Pindad SS3-M1	Pindad		5.56×45mm	Indonesia	yes	2023–present
Pindad SS77	Pindad		5.56×45mm	Indonesia	no	1977 (prototypes only)
Pistol Mitralieră model 1963/1965	ROMARM		7.62×39mm	Romania		1963–1994
Pistolengewehr	Waffenfabrik Bern, Adolf Fürrer		7.65x35mm	Switzerland	no	1920–1921
Pușcă Automată model 1986	ROMARM		5.45×39mm	Romania		1986–present
PVAR rifle	United Defense Manufacturing Corporation		5.56×45mm	Philippines		2011
QBS-06			5.8×42mm (DBS-06)	China		2010
QBZ-03	Norinco		5.8×42mm 5.56×45mm	China		2003–present
QBZ-95	Norinco		5.8×42mm 5.56×45mm	China		1995–present
QBZ-191	Norinco		5.8×42mm	China		c.2019-?
QTS-11	Norinco		5.8×42mm	China		2011–present
Remington R4	Remington Arms		5.56×45mm	United States		2010
Remington R5 RGP	Remington Arms		5.56×45mm	United States		2010
RK 62	Valmet; SAKO		7.62×39mm	Finland		1965-1994
RK 71	Valmet		7.62×39mm.223 Remington; 5.56×45mm	Finland		1970-1976
RK 95 TP	SAKO		7.62×39mm	Finland		1995-1998
Ribeyrolles 1918 automatic carbine			8×35mm Ribeyrolles	France	no	1918
Robinson Armament XCR	Robinson Armament Co		5.56×45mm 5.45×39mm 7.62×39mm 6.8mm Remington SPC; 6.5mm Grendel.260 Remington	United States		2004
RS556	Rheinmetall; Steyr Arms		5.56×45mm	Germany; Austria		
Sako ARG Sako M23 Automatkarbin 24	SAKO		5.56×45mm 7.62×51mm	Finland Sweden		2022
S&T Daewoo XK8	SNT Motiv		5.56×45mm	South Korea	no	2003
S&T Daewoo K11	SNT Motiv		5.56×45mm	South Korea		2010–present
SNT Motiv K13	SNT Motiv		5.56×45mm	South Korea	yes	2023–present
SNT Motiv K17	SNT Motiv		5.56×45mm	South Korea	yes	2025–present
Sa vz. 58	Česká zbrojovka		7.62×39mm	Czechoslovakia	yes	1959-1984
Safir T-16	AKSA Int Arms		5.56×45mm	Turkey		2001
SEAL Recon Rifle	NAVSEA		5.56×45mm	United States	yes	1993
SAR 80	Chartered Industries of Singapore (now known as ST Kinetics)		5.56×45mm	Singapore		c.1984-?
SAR-21	ST Kinetics		5.56×45mm	Singapore	yes	CIS: 1999–2000; ST Kinetics: 2000–present
SAX-200 Xiuhcoatl	Dirección General de Industria Militar del Ejército		5.56×45mm	Mexico		2023
Scicon IW	SD Scicon Ltd		4.7mm caseless	United Kingdom		c.1984
SIG MCX SIG XM7 NGSW	SIG Sauer		5.56×45mm.300 AAC Blackout (MCX).277 Fury (XM5 NGSW)	United States	yes	2015–present (MCX); 2019–Present (XM7)
SIG Sauer SIG516	Schweizerische Industrie Gesellschaft		5.56×45mm.223 Remington; 7.62×39mm	United States	yes	c. 2010–present
SIG Sauer SIGM400	Schweizerische Industrie Gesellschaft		5.56×45mm.223 Remington.300 AAC Blackout	United States	yes	2010-present
SIG SG 530	Schweizerische Industrie Gesellschaft		5.56×45mm	Switzerland		1960s
SG540/SG543	Schweizerische Industrie Gesellschaft		5.56×45mm	Switzerland		1977-2002
SIG550 SIG551 SIG552 SIG553	Swiss Arms AG		5.56×45mm/5.6mm GP Pat 90.300 AAC Blackout (SIG553 only); 7.62x39mm (SIG553 Only)	Switzerland		1986–present
SOCIMI AR-831	Socimi; Franchi		5.56×45mm	Italy		1985
Special Operations Assault Rifle	Ferfrans Specialties		5.56×45mm	United States		2004
SR-3 Vikhr	Tula Arms Plant		9×39mm	Soviet Union		1995-?
SR 88	Chartered Industries of Singapore (now known as ST Kinetics)		5.56×45mm	Singapore		1982-2000
Sterling SAR-87	Sterling Armaments Company		5.56×45mm	United Kingdom		1980s
Steyr AUG	Steyr Mannlicher		5.56×45mm	Austria		1977–present: Base (1977-1983); A1 (1983-1997); A2 (Dec 1997-2005); A3 (2005-present)
Steyr ACR	Steyr Mannlicher		5.56×45mm annular-primed SCF	Austria		1987 (prototypes only)
STV series rifle	Z111 Factory		7.62×39mm	Vietnam		2019
STL-556 VN	Z111 Factory		5.56×45mm	Vietnam		2020s
STL-1A	Z111 Factory		7.62×39mm	Vietnam		2015
Stoner 63	Cadillac Gage		5.56×45mm	United States		1963-1971
StG 44	C.G. Haenel		7.92×33mm Kurz	Nazi Germany	yes	1943-1945
StG 45(M)	Mauser		7.92×33mm Kurz	Nazi Germany	no	1945
STG-556	Microtech Small Arms Research		5.56×45mm.300 AAC Blackout; 6.8mm Remington SPC; 7.62×39mm 5.45×39mm	United States		2007-2015
Stg-51	Waffenfabrik Bern		7.5x38mm Kurzpatrone	Switzerland		1951
T29			.30 Carbine	United States	no	1944
T65 assault rifle	205th Armory		5.56×45mm	Taiwan		1976-?
T86 assault rifle	205th Armory		5.56×45mm	Taiwan		2000-2002
T91 assault rifle	205th Armory		5.56×45mm	Taiwan		2003–present
T112 assault rifle	205th Armory	T112 assault rifle on display	5.56×45mm	Taiwan		2024
TKB-010			5.45×39mm 7.62×39mm	Soviet Union		
TKB-011			7.62×39mm	Soviet Union	no	
TKB-022PM			7.62×39mm	Soviet Union	no	1950s
TKB-059			7.62×39mm	Soviet Union	no	1966
TKB-072	Tula Arms Plant		5.45×39mm	Soviet Union		1975
TKB-0146			5.45×39mm	Soviet Union		
TKB-408			7.62×39mm	Soviet Union	no	1946
TKB-415	Tula Arms Plant		7.62×39mm	Soviet Union	no	1946-1948
TKB-517	Tula Arms Plant		7.62×39mm	Soviet Union		1952
Trichy assault rifle	Ordnance Factory Tiruchirappalli		7.62×39mm	India	yes	2017-present
TRW Low Maintenance Rifle	TRW Systems Group		5.56x45mm	United States	no	1971-1973 (prototypes only)
Type 56 assault rifle	Norinco		7.62×39mm	China		1956–present
Type 58 assault rifle			7.62×39mm	North Korea		1958-1968
Type 63 assault rifle			7.62×39mm	China		1963-?
Type 68 assault rifle	Factory 61/65		7.62×39mm	North Korea		1968-?
Type 81 assault rifle			7.62×39mm	China		1983-?
Type 87 assault rifle			5.8×42mm	China		1989
Type 88 assault rifle			5.45×39mm	North Korea		1988-present
T4	Taurus		5.56×45mm	Brazil		2017
Thompson Light Rifle	Auto Ordnance		.30 Carbine	United States	no	1941
Thompson .351 WSL Variant	Auto Ordnance		.351 Winchester Self-Loading	United States	no	1926
VAHAN			5.45×39mm	Armenian SSR		1952
Valmet M76	Valmet		5.56×45mm 7.62×39mm	Finland		1970s
Valmet M82	Valmet		5.56×45mm 7.62×39mm	Finland		1978-1986
VB Berapi LP06	Vita Berapi		5.56×45mm	Malaysia		2006
Vektor CR-21	Denel		5.56×45mm	South Africa		1997-?
Vektor R4	Denel		5.56×45mm	South Africa		c.1980-?
Vepr	National Space Agency		5.45×39mm	Ukraine		c.2003
Vollmer M35	Heinrich Vollmer		7.75×40.5mm 7.75×39.5mm	Nazi Germany	no	1934
VSK-100	Kidma-tec Ltd		7.62×39mm	Belarus		2021
Woodhull light rifle	Woodhull Corporation		.30 Carbine	United States	no	1941
Wieger StG-940			5.56×45mm 5.45×39mm	East Germany		1980s
Wimmersperg Spz	Family of prototype weapons by Heinrich von Wimmersperg		7.92×33mm Kurz	Germany	no	1944
XM8 rifle	Heckler & Koch		5.56×45mm	Germany; United States		2003–present
XT-97 Assault Rifle	205th Armory		5.56×45mm	Taiwan		2008
XM29 OICW	Heckler & Koch; Alliant Techsystems		5.56×45mm	Germany; United States	no	1996-2004 (prototypes only)
Zastava M19	Zastava Arms		6.5mm Grendel; 7.62x39mm	Serbia		2022-present
Zastava M21	Zastava Arms		5.56×45mm	Serbia		2004–present
Zastava M70	Zastava Arms		7.62×39mm	Yugoslavia		1970–present
Zastava M80	Zastava Arms		5.56×45mm	Yugoslavia		1984-?
Zastava M85	Zastava Arms		5.56×45mm	Yugoslavia		1985
Zastava M90	Zastava Arms		5.56×45mm	Serbia		1990
Zastava M92	Zastava Arms		7.62x39mm	Yugoslavia		1992-present
ZK 412	Zbrojovka Brno		8x35mm Rapid	Czechoslovakia	no	1941-1943

== See also ==
- List of battle rifles
- List of bolt-action rifles
- List of carbines
- List of grenade launchers
- List of machine guns
- List of multiple-barrel firearms
- List of pistols
- List of pump-action rifles
- List of revolvers
- List of semi-automatic pistols
- List of semi-automatic rifles
- List of sniper rifles
- List of straight-pull rifles
