= LSAT (disambiguation) =

LSAT may refer to:

- Law School Admission Test, a standardized test that is part of the law school admission process
- Lightweight Small Arms Technologies, a U.S. weapon program
- LSAT (oxide), (La,Sr)(Al,Ta)O_{3} (lanthanum strontium aluminium tantalum oxide), a ceramic crystal with the perovskite structure
- LSAT light machine gun
- LSAT caseless ammunition
- LSAT rifle
