= LSAT rifle =

LSAT Rifle
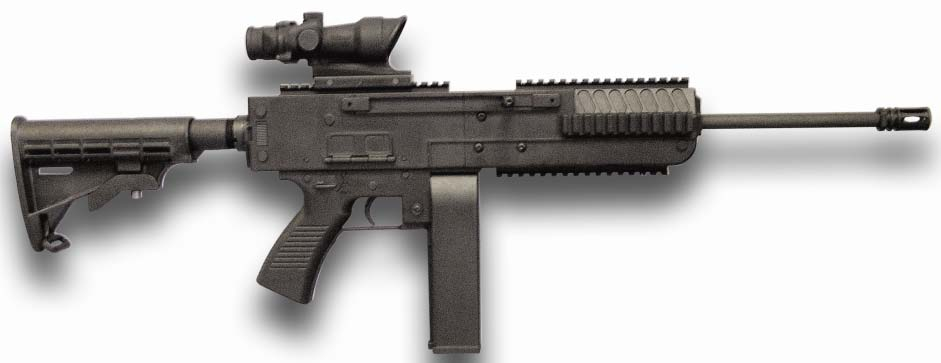
- Type: Assault rifle
- Place of origin: United States

Production history
- Designer: AAI Corporation and ARES, Inc.
- Designed: 2008 onwards
- Manufacturer: TBD
- Produced: Earliest: 2011
- Variants: 2 Polymer-cased ammunition firing variants 2 Caseless ammunition firing variants

Specifications
- Cartridge: LSAT polymer-cased ammunition LSAT caseless ammunition
- Caliber: 5.56 mm (At present)
- Action: Gas-piston; push-through feed-and-ejection
- Feed system: Spring-fed magazines Weapon-powered, spring-less magazines
- Sights: optical, involving advanced tracking and acquisition

The LSAT rifle, of the LSAT (Lightweight Small Arms Technologies) program, is a developmental assault rifle. Design began in 2008, four years after the beginning of the LSAT program. Like the LSAT LMG, the rifle is designed to be significantly lighter than existing designs, and is designed to fire lighter ammunition. Like the rest of the program, the weapon extensively uses parallel development. It has designs for polymer-cased ammunition and caseless ammunition, and designs using spring-loading magazines and weapon-powered magazines. This parallel development reduces the risk of the program failing. Computer simulation and modelling, particularly of the LMG, is being used for all components of the program, including the rifle. This reduces both time and expenditure for prototyping and testing. The other program components use a 'spiral development' approach, whereby the product is rolled out in stages or 'spirals', each stage producing a new version that is an improvement on those from previous spirals; the rifle shall likely use the same approach. The weapon and the program are closely connected to the Future Force Warrior concept, with aims to integrate electronics and computerized optics, and aims to increase the mobility of soldiers. The weapon is also intended to improve on reliability and ease of maintenance.

== Design Requirements ==
Various new designs for infantry drove the requirement for the standard rifle to be lighter. New uses of information technology and future concepts (such as the Future Force Warrior) require lighter equipment. Notably, when extra weight from advanced, computerized optical sights is introduced, the weapon needs to be made lighter to compensate. New strategic concepts require greater infantry mobility to be fully realized. Making the LSAT rifle lighter is the most essential innovation of development. Other improvements are also important. The weapon is being designed with the integration of electronics and advanced optics in mind. The reliability of the current M16 and M4 compared with rifles using gas pistons has led many to call for the former weapons to be replaced. A highly reliable gas-system is important for the LSAT rifle. Improved reliability of the rifle in general is a likely requirement, similar to the improved reliability objective for the LSAT LMG.

== Design Progress ==
The rifle design began with seventeen concepts; however, after the concepts were investigated and trade-offs were analysed, only two remained for the cased round, and two for the caseless round. The two designs for each ammunition type revolve around two magazine approaches. One uses the standard mechanism, with springs inside the magazine feeding rounds into the weapon; the other uses a 'weapon powered' approach, presumably to reduce the extra weight and space that springs create in magazines. Both magazine designs are focused around high capacity. The rifle designs are undergoing the same simulated, structural, and kinematic analyses as the LMG. Both a working rifle and accompanying ammunition prototypes have been made, but it uncertain if or when the program will result in a new rifle for the US military.

On 14 May 2014, Textron Systems was awarded a two-year $5.7 million contract for work that included development of a carbine firing cased-telescoped ammunition.

== See also ==
- Lightweight Small Arms Technologies
- MR-C
- Heckler & Koch G11
- List of assault rifles
