= List of equipment of the Nigerian Army =

This is a list of publicly identified equipment in use with the Nigerian Army. Due to the large variety of weapon systems and equipment procured over the decades, and the inherited culture of secretiveness of the Nigerian Army, it is currently almost impossible to calculate the sum of all weaponry in the army.

== Personnel Equipment ==
=== Camouflage ===
Model	Image	Origin	Type	Quantity	Notes
M14 Pattern Camouflage		Nigeria	Combat uniform		Introduced in 2014, it is the standard issue camouflage pattern of the Nigerian Armed Forces. Intended to replace the large variety of commercial and surplus military patterns then in use, the four-colour pattern comes in green-dominant Woodland and khaki Arid variants. The uniform cut is based on the US Battle Dress Uniform with minor alterations.
MultiCam		United States	Combat uniform		Currently used by some special forces units. Many soldiers have privately purchased apparel, pouches, helmets and body armor in MultiCam camo (both genuine and commercial copies) for personal use.
U.S. Woodland		Nigeria	Combat uniform		Originally adopted in the 1990s as Nigerian forces were increasingly committed to overseas peace support and military operations, the Nigerian Army used both donated surplus US BDUs, as well as imported Chinese and locally-made copies.

=== Helmet ===
Model	Image	Origin	Type	Quantity	Notes
Corlon M80		South Korea	Combat Helmet		During the 1980s, Nigeria imported a number of helmets from South Korea to supplant their existing manganese steel Mk IV and M1 helmets.
MICH		China	Combat Helmet		Small numbers purchased in the late 2010s to supplant existing PASGT-type helmets.
FAST		United States	Combat Helmet		Issued mainly to special operations forces, the Nigerian Army uses a mix of genuine Gentex FAST High Cut helmets donated as military aid, and a bevy of FAST clones of Chinese and local origin. In recent years the latter have become more common in line infantry units.

=== Ballistic Vests ===
Model	Image	Origin	Type	Quantity	Notes
Soldier Plate Carrier System		Nigeria	Bulletproof vest		The Army and Special Forces use multiple tactical vests and plate carriers from local manufacturers.
Modular Tactical Vest		Nigeria	Bulletproof vest		Standard Issued for the Military from local manufacturers.

=== Night Vision Goggles ===
Model	Image	Origin	Type	Quantity	Notes
Thales Sophie-LR		France	Handheld thermal image and laser rangefinder		
EOTech GPNVG-18		France	Binocular night-vision device		Limited issue, used by special operations units and aviators.
AN/PVS-7		United States	Biocular night-vision device		

=== Optics and Scope ===
Model	Image	Origin	Type	Quantity	Notes
Mepro M21		Israel	Red dot sight		
MEPRO MX3 F/T		Israel	Magnifier Scope		

== Infantry weapons ==
=== Handgun ===
Model	Image	Calibre	Type	Origin	Notes
Beretta 92		9×19mm Parabellum	Semi-automatic pistol	Italy	Small number of privately purchased Berettas in use with Nigerian Army officers.
Beretta M1951		9×19mm Parabellum	Semi-automatic pistol	Italy	Manufactured under license from Beretta since the 1970s.
Browning Hi-Power		9×19mm Parabellum	Semi-automatic pistol	Belgium; Nigeria	Status: In service Produced locally under licence as the NP-1.

=== Submachine Gun ===
Model	Image	Calibre	Type	Origin	Notes
Heckler & Koch MP5		9×19mm Parabellum; 10mm Auto	Submachine gun	West Germany	
Beretta M12		9×19mm Parabellum	Submachine gun	Italy; Nigeria	Produced locally under license by DICON.

=== Assault Rifles ===
Model	Image	Calibre	Type	Origin	Notes
IWI Tavor		5.56×45mm NATO	Bullpup assault rifle	Israel	Status: In service Used mostly by Special Forces.
AK Alfa		7.62×39mm	Assault rifle	United States; Israel	Status: In service Used by Special Forces.
Beryl M762		7.62×39mm	Assault rifle	Poland; Nigeria	Status: In service Produced locally under license by DICON (Defence Industries Corporation of Nigeria).
AK-103		7.62×39mm	Assault rifle	Russia; Nigeria	Produced locally by DICON as DG-103. Will replace AK-47s/OBJ 006 in infantry units
FB Mini-Beryl		5.56×45mm NATO	Compact assault rifle (carbine)	Poland	Status: Testing 10 test units purchased.
FN FNC		5.56×45mm NATO	Assault rifle	Belgium	Status: In service
Beretta AR70/90		5.56×45mm NATO	Assault rifle	Italy	Status: In service
Daewoo K2		5.56×45mm NATO	Assault rifle	South Korea	Status: Active Purchased 3,000 in 1984, which were delivered in 1985. Another batch was purchased in 1996. Additional 30,000 rifles were sold in 2006.
AK-47		7.62×39mm	Assault rifle	Soviet Union; Nigeria	Status: Active Produced as OBJ-006.
AKM		7.62×39mm	Assault rifle	Soviet Union	
Beretta BM 59		7.62×51mm NATO	Battle rifle	Italy; Nigeria	Status: Active; Use For Ceremonial Purpose, Produced locally under licence by DICON.

=== Machine Guns ===
Model	Image	Calibre	Type	Origin	Notes
FN MAG		7.62×51mm NATO	General-purpose machine gun	Belgium	Status: Active
UKM-2000		7.62×51mm NATO	General-purpose machine gun	Poland	Status: Active
RPK		5.45×39mm	Light machine gun	Soviet Union	Status: Active
W85 Machine Gun		12.7×108mm	Heavy machine gun	China	Status: Active Vehicle-mounted machine gun on the VS/P3 Bigfoot MRAP
M2 Browning		12.7×99mm NATO (.50 BMG)	Heavy machine gun	United States	
DShK		12.7×108mm	Heavy machine gun	Soviet Union	

=== Precision Rifles ===
Model	Image	Calibre	Type	Origin	Notes
WKW Tor		7.62mm NATO	Bolt action Sniper rifle	Poland	
IWI Dan		.338 Lapua Magnum	Bolt action Sniper rifle	Israel	
Orsis T-5000		7.62×51mm NATO	Bolt action Sniper rifle	Russia	Used by the Nigeria Army Special Forces Unit against Boko haram and ISWAP in the North east of the country
Truvelo CMS		.338 Lapua Magnum	Anti-materiel Sniper Rifle	South Africa	

=== Grenade-based Weapons ===
Model	Image	Calibre	Type	Origin	Notes
Norinco LG3 AGL		40mm	Automatic grenade launcher	China	Status:Active; AGL's are grenades capable of fully automatic fire. Able to take out approaching enemy vehicles 2 km away.

== Armoured fighting vehicles ==
=== Tanks ===
Model	Image	Type	Variant	Origin	Quantity	Notes
VT-4		Main Battle Tank	VT-4	China	17	
T-72		Main Battle Tank	T-72AV T-72M1	Soviet Union	~10 ~31	
T-54		Main Battle Tank	T-55	Soviet Union	~100	
Vickers		Main Battle Tank	Vickers Mk3	United Kingdom	~172	

=== Tank Destroyer ===
Model	Image	Type	Variant	Origin	Quantity	Notes
ST-1		Tank Destroyer		China	N/A	Delivered in April 2020.

=== Reconnaissance Vehicle ===
Model	Image	Type	Variant	Origin	Quantity	Notes
FV101 Scorpion		Reconnaissance vehicle		United Kingdom	157	
FV107 Scimitar		Reconnaissance vehicle		United Kingdom	5	More units purchased from Jordan
EE-9 Cascavel		Armoured car		Brazil	70	Delivered in 1994.
Panhard ERC		Armoured car	ERC-90	France	80	40 with Lynx turret.
Panhard AML		Armoured car	AML-60 AML-90	France	130	
Panhard VBL		Scout car	VB2L PC	France	72	

=== Infantry Fighting Vehicle ===
Model	Image	Type	Variant	Origin	Quantity	Notes
BMP		Infantry fighting vehicle	BMP-1 BMP-2	Soviet Union; Czechoslovakia	22 40	

=== Armoured Personnel Carrier ===
Model	Image	Type	Variant	Origin	Quantity	Notes
Type 89 AFV		Armoured personnel carrier	ZSD-85	China	60	Delivered in 2021
Saurer		Armoured personnel carrier	4K 4FA	Austria	250	.
MT-LB		Armoured personnel carrier		Soviet Union	67	Sourced from Poland.
Mowag Piranha		Armoured personnel carrier	Piranha I	Switzerland	110	
BTR-3		Armoured personnel carrier	BTR-3U "Guardian"	Ukraine	47	
BTR		Armoured personnel carrier	BTR-60 BTR-70	Soviet Union	6 18	
Isotrex		Armoured personnel carrier	Phantom II	UAE	24	Seen on display during NADCEL 2025
Isotrex		Armoured personnel carrier	Legion	UAE	60	
Streit Group MK.III		Light armored vehicle	Warrior Typhoon Spartan	Canada	237	Delivered between 2017 and 2022 Seen on display during NADCEL 2025

=== Mine -Resistant Ambush Protected Vehicle ===
Model	Image	Type	Origin	Quantity	Notes
CS/VP3 MRAP		Mine-Resistant Ambush Protected Vehicle	China	310	120 was delivered in 2015, 40 delivered in 2018, and a further 100 was delivered in 2021 between March and November. Additional 50 was delivered as confirmed by General Lagbaja in June 2024.
Ezugwu		Mine-Resistant Ambush Protected Vehicle	Nigeria	80+	80 confirmed. 28+52
PF ARA		Mine-Resistant Ambush Protected Vehicle	Nigeria	40+	
PF Hulk		Mine-Resistant Ambush Protected Vehicle	Nigeria	5	
EPV24 Dodandawa		Mine-Resistant Ambush Protected Vehicle	Nigeria		
Reva		Mine-Resistant Ambush Protected Vehicle	South Africa	40	Mk III.

=== Special operation vehicles ===
Model	Image	Type	Origin	Quantity	Notes
Proforce Fury		Light rapid response vehicle	Nigeria		
Polaris Ranger 1000		All-Terrain vehicle	United States		

=== Light armored vehicles ===
Model	Image	Type	Origin	Quantity	Notes
PF Viper		Light Tactical Vehicle	Nigeria	120	
Dongfeng Mengshi Csk131		Light Tactical Vehicle	China; Nigeria	120	20 reverse engineered units delivered to the army in May 2024
Plasan Sand Cat		Composite armored vehicle	Israel		More units ordered
Nurol Yörük NMS		Light armored vehicle	Turkey		13 on order
Otokar Cobra		Light tactical vehicle	Turkey	204	
INKAS LAPV		Light armored patrol vehicle	Canada		
KLTV		Light tactical vehicle	South Korea	5	

=== Armoured Ambulances ===
Model	Image	Type	Origin	Quantity	Notes
FV104 Samaritan		Tracked armoured ambulance	United Kingdom	N/A	

== Engineering and Logistics vehicles ==
Model	Image	Type	Origin	Quantity	Notes
BOZENA 5		Unmanned ground vehicle	Slovakia	N/A	Clearance of all conventional antipersonnel and antitank land mines and for IED removal assistance.
Vickers AVLB		Armored bridge-layer	United Kingdom	26	
Vickers ARV		Armored recovery vehicle	United Kingdom	12	
KrAZ-6322		Utility truck	Ukraine	N/A	Some locally manufactured.
Ashok Leyland		Troop Carrier	India	700	Assembled in Nigeria.

== Utility vehicle ==
Model	Image	Type	Origin	Quantity	Notes
Dongfeng EQ2050		Light armored vehicle	China; Nigeria		
Toyota Hilux		Light truck	Japan	4000+	
Toyota Land Cruiser		Light truck	Japan Nigeria	N/A	Used as utility vehicles and technicals, Some were converted to armored cars. Locally manufactured by Vanquish Industries Ltd
Tarpan Honker		Multipurpose pickup truck	Poland	25	
IVM G-12		Special purpose vehicles	Nigeria	N/A	Licensed Copy of the Beijing BJ2022
IVM G-80		Light truck	Nigeria	40	Licensed Copy of the Beijing BJ2022

== Artillery ==
=== Self-propelled Artillery ===
Model	Image	Type	Origin	Quantity	Notes
SH-5 SH-2		Self-propelled howitzer	China	15	105mm caliber 122mm caliber
Palmaria		Self-propelled howitzer	Italy	25	

=== Rocket Artillery ===
Model	Image	Type	Origin	Quantity	Notes
APR–40		Multiple rocket launcher	Romania	25	
BM-21 Grad		Multiple rocket launcher	Soviet Union	5	
RM-70		Multiple rocket launcher	Czechoslovakia	7	

=== Mortar ===
Model	Image	Type	Origin	Quantity	Notes
L16		81mm mortar	United Kingdom	220	

=== Anti Tank Gun ===
Model	Image	Type	Origin	Quantity	Notes
ZiS-3		Anti-tank gun	Soviet Union	N/A	

=== Field Artillery ===
Model	Image	Type	Origin	Quantity	Notes
D-30		Field Howitzer	Soviet Union	90	
D-74		Field Howitzer	Soviet Union	90	
M46		Field Howitzer	Soviet Union	7	
D-20		Field Howitzer	Soviet Union	4	Delivered in 1992.
Haubits FH77		Howitzer	Sweden	24	Reportedly, all guns are in storage.
OTO Melara Mod 56		Howitzer	Italy	124	200 delivered.

== Anti-tank Weapons ==
Model	Image	Type	Origin	Quantity	Notes
Swingfire		Anti-tank missile	United Kingdom	100 in stock.	
HJ-12		Anti-tank guided missiles	China	Unknown	
M40		Recoilless rifle	United States		
Carl Gustav		Recoilless rifle	Sweden		
RPG-7		Anti-tank weapon	Soviet Union; Nigeria		

== Air defence ==
=== Anti-aircraft Weapons ===
Model	Image	Type	Origin	Quantity	Notes
Roland		Surface-to-air missile	France	16	Mounted on AMX-30 chassis.
Blowpipe		Surface-to-air missile	United Kingdom	48	
9K32 Strela-2		Surface-to-air missile	Soviet Union	100	

=== Self-propelled anti-aircraft gun ===
Model	Image	Type	Origin	Quantity	Notes
ZSU-23-4		Self-propelled anti-aircraft gun	Soviet Union	30	

=== Towed anti-aircraft gun ===
Model	Image	Type	Origin	Quantity	Notes
ZPU		Towed anti-aircraft gun	Soviet Union	N/A	
ZU-23-2		Towed anti-aircraft gun	Soviet Union	350	

=== Electronic Warfare ===
Model	Image	Type	Origin	Quantity	Notes
EDM4S SkyWiper		Drone Jammer	Lithuania		
DEMFAS MP-MBFJ		Drone Jammer	Nigeria		
Aselsan IHASAVAR		Drone Jammer	Turkey		

== Radars ==
Model	Image	Type	Origin	Quantity	Notes
Radars
Ground Observer 12		Ground Radar	France	U/N	It entered the service of the Nigerian Army in 2018
PGSR-3i ‘Beagle’		Ground Radar	Hungary	U/N	
Spexer 2000		Ground Radar	Germany	U/N	

== Aircraft ==
Model	Image	Type	Origin	Quantity	Notes
Attack Aircraft
MD 530F Cayuse Warrior		Light Attack helicopter	United States		Status: On order 12 units on order Total of 36 units Planned
Bell UH-1 Iroquois		Utility	United States	2	
Magnus MF-212		Attack Aircraft	Hungary		3 on order
Unmanned Aerial Vehicle
Bayraktar TB2		Multi-Mission	Turkey	6	
Aerosonde Mk4.7		ISR Drone	United States		
Ziyan Blowfish A2		Multi-Mission	China		

== Retired equipment ==
Model	Image	Type	Origin	Quantity	Notes
Personnel Equipment
Walther P5		Semi-automatic pistol	West Germany		
Sten		Submachine gun	United Kingdom		
Sterling		Submachine gun	United Kingdom		
SIG SG 540		Assault rifle	Switzerland		
M16A1		Assault rifle	United States		
NR-1		Battle rifle	Belgium; Nigeria		FN FAL Local variant designated NR-1. replaced by Beryl M762
Uzi		Submachine gun	Israel		Phased out and no longer in much use.
MG 3 machine gun		General-purpose machine gun	Germany		Status: in reserve
Anti-aircraft
Bofors L/60		Towed anti-aircraft gun	Sweden	12	
Vehicle
Shorland		Armoured car	United Kingdom	Mk 3.	
Haflinger		Utility vehicle	Austria	400	
Pinzgauer		High-mobility all-terrain vehicle	Austria	N/A	
Land Rover		Utility vehicle	United Kingdom; Nigeria	N/A	Some locally manufactured.
