= HK36 =

HK36 may refer to:

- The Diamond HK36 Super Dimona motor glider
- The Heckler & Koch HK36 experimental assault rifle of the 1970s
- The Heckler & Koch G36 assault rifle of the 1990s
- The Hokejový Klub 36 Skalica professional ice hockey team
