= MSMC =

MSMC may refer to:

- Any of a number of educational institutions named Mount St. Mary's
- Mount Sinai Medical Center (Chicago), in Chicago
- Mount Sinai Medical Center (Miami), in Miami
- Mount Scopus Memorial College, a private school located in Melbourne, Victoria, Australia
- Modern Sub Machine Carbine, an Indian submachine gun
