= Polypenco =

Polypenco may refer to:

- Polyoxymethylene, an engineering thermoplastic, genericized trademark name polypenco
  - Nippon Polypenco Limited, a Japanese company; See Nylatron
