= AO-27 =

AO-27 may refer to:

- AO-27 rifle
- USS Kaskaskia (AO-27)
- Eyesat-1, an amateur radio satellite also known as AO-27
