= AO-35 =

AO-35 may refer to:

- AO-35 assault rifle
- USS Housatonic (AO-35)
