= Interdynamics MKS =

MKS Assault Rifle
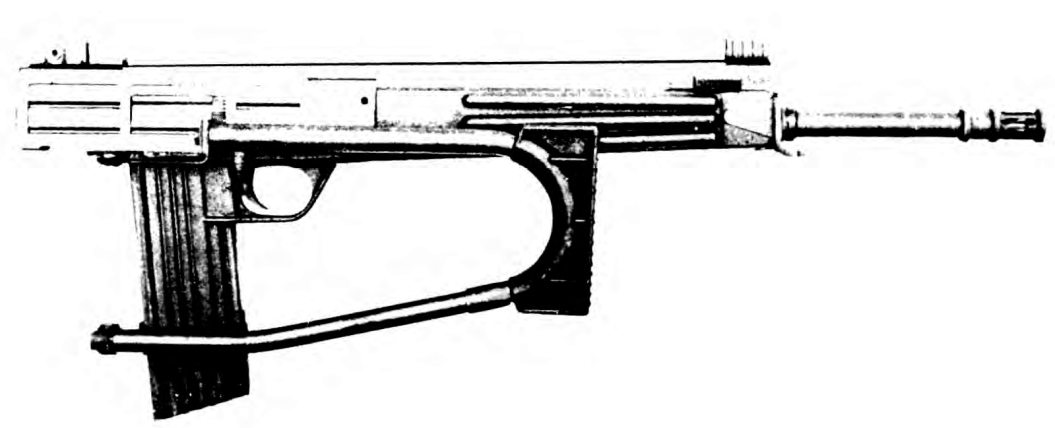
- Swedish MKS 5.57 mm assault rifle
- Type: Assault rifle Personal defense weapon
- Place of origin: Sweden

Production history
- Designed: 1979
- Manufacturer: Interdynamics

Specifications
- Cartridge: 5.56×45mm NATO
- Caliber: 5.56mm
- Action: Gas-operated
- Rate of fire: 750/1,100 RPM
- Feed system: 30-round detachable box magazine
- Sights: Fixed

The MKS is a gas-operated, select-fire rifle of the 5.56×45mm NATO caliber and was manufactured in Sweden by Interdynamic AB.

== Design ==
The MKS was a gas-operated select fire rifle chambered for the 5.56 mm NATO cartridge and was capable of firing around 750/1,100 RPM. It featured rotating barrel locking and was the first gun made by Interdynamics in 1979. The weapon featured a magazine insert that acted as the pistol grip similar to the Uzi submachine gun. Its receiver was made from stamped steel.

Tests in the Philippines proved the gun too uncomfortable for the average shooter to fire well and it never made it beyond the prototype stage.

== Variants ==
The only variants made for the MKS consisted of an assault rifle and carbine.

== See also ==
- Interdynamic MKR
- Wimmersperg Spz - older weapon with similar configuration
