= LR-300 =

LR 300-ML-N
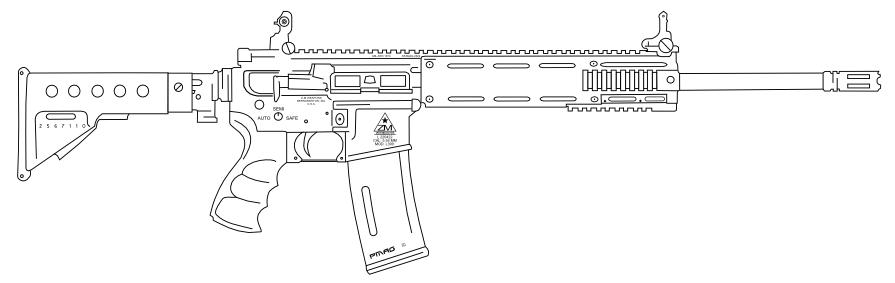
- The LR 300-ML-N
- Type: Assault rifle Semi-automatic rifle
- Place of origin: United States

Production history
- Designer: Allan Zitta
- Manufacturer: Z-M Weapons
- Produced: 2000-2007 (Z-M Weapons); 2009-2011 (Para Ordnance USA)

Specifications
- Mass: 3.1 kilograms (6.8 lb)
- Length: 546 millimetres (21.5 in)
- Barrel length: 292 millimetres (11.5 in)
- Cartridge: 5.56×45mm NATO
- Caliber: 5.56mm
- Action: Gas-operated, rotating bolt
- Rate of fire: 950 rounds/min
- Effective firing range: 300 m/328yd
- Feed system: Various STANAG Magazines
- Sights: Iron sights

The Z-M LR-300 is an American select-fire assault rifle designed by gunsmith Allan Zitta and manufactured by Z-M Weapons. The model name LR-300 stands for Light Rifle and 300 is for 300 meters, which is regarded by the manufacturer as the effective range of the rifle with a standard 55 gr (3.6 g) FMJ bullet. The design is based on the AR-15, M16 and C7 rifles, but has a unique semi-direct gas impingement system and a folding stock option.

== History ==
The design was originally a stockless short-barreled pistol version of an AR-15 receiver that Allan Zitta used in target shooting competitions. It later went into commercial production as the Master Blaster in 1996. Zitta later developed it into a full rifle with a folding stock, and conversion kits have also been offered for AR-15 rifles.

In 2008, the LR-300 was offered under the name Para Tactical Target Rifle (TTR) as a result of a joint collaboration between Para USA and ZM Weapons.

== Description ==
The direct gas impingement system used in the LR-300 is intended to solve the fouling problems of the traditional AR-15 direct gas impingement gas system. The forward-mounted return spring also allows for fitting a folding stock, and the factory stock option folds to the left side. The rifle is also available with a fixed stock. Since its introduction, the exterior design has evolved and changed a couple of times.

LR-300MLs have flat-top receivers with Picatinny rails, allowing them to be used with multiple types of sighting systems. The trigger, forward assist, magazine release and bolt hold release are identical to those of the AR-15. The barrel has a 1:9 inch (230 mm) twist ratio, is chrome lined, and the muzzle is fitted with a Phantom flash suppressor.

=== Firing mode ===
The weapon was originally designed with select-fire, offering the option for semi-auto, full auto, and burst fire options. When fired, the LR-300 has a built-in counter-recoil mechanism which helps to off-set muzzle rise, decreasing the recoil in comparison to the inspiration for the rifle, the M16.

=== Stock ===
Contrary to the original AR-15 rifle design, the LR-300 has the capability to use a fully folding and adjustable skeletal stock. Most AR-15 rifle variants have a thick, cylindrical recoil buffer tube, more properly called the receiver extension, that protrudes approximately 20 cm (7.9 in) straight back from the rear of the receiver, and the firearm cannot operate without it. This normally precludes the use of anything but fixed or telescoping stocks. The LR-300 however uses a forward-mounted return spring which removes the need for a receiver extension.

=== Gas system ===
The LR-300 uses a modified version of the AR-15's standard direct impingement gas operating system dubbed delayed impingement gas system. The gas key is extended beyond its normal length (manufacturer calls it an "operating rod"), extending into the handguard. The gas key contains the return spring which is fixed between the front of the receiver and the collar at the front of the gas key. The gas port is under the back side of the gas block, gasses go up then forward to the front side of the gas block then up and back to the gas tube. The gas tube is about half of the length of a standard AR-15 tube. The gas tube is always inside of the gas key (minimal overlap is about 1 inch). This leaves the area near the bolt much cleaner. Almost all gasses exit the gun through the holes on the right side of the bolt carrier, and minimal leaks from the gas key to the handguard area do not hinder the gun's function.

=== Upper ===
To accommodate the unique forward buffer and gas impingement system, the proprietary upper is taller and thicker than a standard AR upper. The handguard rail has a removable top cover to access the recoil spring system for disassembly. The charging handle is proprietary and has a beefier design to fit the op-rod.

== Models ==
- LR-300 ML-A: Military/law enforcement model (selective fire version). Has an 11.53 in (293 mm) barrel, aluminium forend, and fires single shots or bursts.
- LR-300 ML-N: Military/law enforcement model (selective fire version). Has an 11.53 in (293 mm) barrel, Nylatron forend with attachable Picatinny rails, and fires single shots or bursts.
- LR-300 SR-A: Sport rifle model (semi-auto fire version). Has a 16.49 in (419 mm) barrel, aluminum forend, and fires single shots.
- LR-300 SR-N: Sport rifle model (semi-auto fire version). Has a 16.49 in (419 mm) barrel, Nylatron forend with attachable Picatinny rails, and fires single shots.
- LR-300 AXL: Aluminium quad handguard.
- LR-300 AXLT: Aluminium partial handguard.
- LR-300 NXL: Nylatron handguard.
- TTR-XA: Handguard with full length aluminium quad rail.
- TTR-XAS: Aluminium handguard partially fitted with picatinny rails on bottom and sides at 90 mm (3.5 inches) of its length.
- TTR-XASF: Aluminium handguard partially fitted with picatinny rails on bottom and sides, fixed stock.
- TTR-XN: Nylatron handguard.

== In popular culture ==
- The rifle can be seen and used by the player in the video game Urban Terror.
- The rifle is seen prominently and can be used by the player in the video game S.T.A.L.K.E.R.: Shadow of Chernobyl and its sequels.
- The rifle can be seen and used by the player in the video game Rust.
- In video game Payday 2, a rifle named CAR-4 can be equipped with attachments that make it heavily resemble the LR-300.

== See also ==
- SIG MCX, another folding stock AR-15 style rifle
