= TKB-072 =

- Type: Assault rifle
- Place of origin: Soviet Union

Production history
- Designer: German A. Korobov
- Designed: 1975
- Manufacturer: Tula Arms Plant

Specifications
- Cartridge: 5.45×39mm
- Caliber: 5.45mm
- Action: Gas-operated
- Feed system: 30-round detachable box magazine
- Sights: Iron sights

The TKB-072 (Russian: ТКБ-072) is a Soviet assault rifle designed by G.A.Korobov on the basis of creation of some skilled automatic devices chambered in 5.45mm spends experimental researches of influence of pace of shooting on кучность fight and for the first time experimentally increases the rate of fire as well as enabling the capability of shooting from unstable positions (costing with hands and laying with hands), but worsens shooting from stable position (laying with an emphasis). It comes to the concept, that required improved automatic shooting from all positions the arrow maybe is provided only by a two-tempo design of the assault rifle. Subsequently, the variant of the TKB-072 with balanced automatics in which action of an impulse of feedback has been combined on time with action of a compensating impulse from muzzle brakes has been worked.

== See also ==
- List of assault rifles
