= Burton Machine Rifle =

Early automatic rifle

Winchester-Burton M1917 LMR
- Type: Select-fire automatic rifle
- Place of origin: United States

Production history
- Designer: Frank Burton
- Designed: c.1916-1917

Specifications
- Mass: 4.54 kg (10.0 lb)
- Length: 1,155.7 mm (45.50 in)
- Barrel length: 635 mm (25.0 in)
- Cartridge: .345 WSL
- Action: Blowback
- Rate of fire: 800 rpm
- Muzzle velocity: 564 m/s (1,850 ft/s)
- Maximum firing range: 1,400 m (1,500 yd)
- Feed system: 2×20-round detachable box magazines
- Sights: Ladder sight

The Winchester-Burton Light Machine Rifle or Burton M1917 LMR (known colloquially as the Burton) is an early automatic rifle designed by Frank F. Burton in 1917. It is thought to have been designed for destroying enemy observation balloons, but the theory is unconfirmed. It is one of the first true assault rifles.

== Design and development ==
In 1916, Frank F. Burton began developing the rifle, creating a single example.

The most prominent feature of the Burton LMR is the twin 20-round box magazines positioned 30° left and right from the rifle's line of sight. The magazines have two locking catches on the front, and one over-travel stop on the back, that allow one magazine to feed whilst placing the other on standby.

The only extant example (now at the Cody Firearms Museum) of the LMR has two interchangeable barrels: ground and airborne. The infantry barrel is equipped with a bayonet lug. Both barrels feature cooling fins similar to later weapons such as the Thompson 1928.

The primary trigger is housed within the trigger guard, and is used to fire in semi-automatic. The LMR utilises an additional trigger located under the trigger guard as the select-fire mechanism. Squeezing the trigger causes the sear to be locked in place, allowing the bolt to return for fully-automatic fire.

It features an open bolt with a simple blowback operation to cycle new rounds and eject spent casings downward. The charging handle is also shaped like a trigger and is located on the bottom of the receiver.

The Burton LMR meets the majority of requirements needed to be classified as an assault rifle; it is select-fire, magazine fed, chambered in an intermediate cartridge, and can be shoulder-fired. It is the only known assault rifle to use a simple blowback operation.

=== Ammunition ===
The .345 Winchester Self-Loading is a straight walled rimless, centerfire intermediate cartridge created in 1917 by Frank Burton for the light machine rifle. The cartridge was created by modifying .351 Winchester Self-Loading shells and fitting an 8.8mm spitzer bullet. It is speculated that the bullet is large enough to house an incendiary component, however the original ammunition cards do not specify an incendiary capability.

== In popular culture ==
- The rifle was added to Battlefield 1 in 2018.

== See also ==
- List of assault rifles
- List of carbines
- Winchester Repeating Arms Company
- Fedorov Avtomat, early automatic rifle

== Sources ==
- Michael, Danny (2019). "Burton machine rifle" (PDF). Points West (Summer). Buffalo Bill Center of the West: 17.
- Johnston, G.P.; Nelson, T.B. (2016). "The Burton Solid Bolt Self-Loading Assault Rifle". The World's Assault Rifles. Ironside International Publishers, Inc. ISBN 978-1-61984-601-2.
