= SOCIMI AR-831 =

- Type: Assault rifle
- Place of origin: Italy

Production history
- Designed: 1985–1987
- Manufacturer: Societa Costruzioni Industriali Milano, Luigi Franchi S.p.A.
- Variants: AR-831; AR-871

Specifications
- Cartridge: 5.56×45mm NATO
- Caliber: 5.56mm
- Action: Gas-operated
- Feed system: 30-round detachable STANAG magazine
- Sights: Iron sights

The SOCIMI AR-831 is an assault rifle of Italian origin based on the AR-15. The weapon is gas operated and is chambered in the 5.56×45mm NATO round.

== See also ==
- Daewoo K2, another M16/AK derivative
- List of assault rifles
