= Grad AR =

- Type: Bullpup Assault rifle
- Place of origin: South Ossetia

Service history
- In service: 2010–present
- Used by: See Users

Production history
- Manufacturer: State Factories North Ossetia
- Produced: 2010-present

Specifications
- Mass: 3.4 kg (7.50 lb)
- Length: 943 mm (37.1 in)
- Barrel length: 415 mm (16.3 in)
- Cartridge: 5.45×39mm or 6x49mm
- Action: Gas-operated; Rotating Bolt
- Rate of fire: 650 rounds/min
- Muzzle velocity: 899 m/s (2,949 ft/s)
- Maximum firing range: 847m
- Feed system: 30 round detachable magazine
- Sights: Iron sight, optional optics

The Grad AR is a South Ossetian Assault Rifle based on the AK-74, but in a bullpup configuration.

== See also ==
- AK-74
- OTs-14
- FAMAS
- QBZ-95
- TAR-21
- List of assault rifles
