= Interdynamics MKR =

- Type: Bullpup assault rifle
- Place of origin: Sweden

Production history
- Designer: George Kellgren
- Designed: 1980s
- Manufacturer: Interdynamics AB

Specifications
- Mass: 6 lbs (2.7 kg)
- Length: 33.1 in (84 cm)
- Barrel length: 25.2 in (64 cm)
- Cartridge: 4.5×26mm MKR
- Caliber: 4.5mm
- Action: Blowback
- Rate of fire: 1,800 RPM
- Maximum firing range: 300m
- Feed system: 50-round detachable box magazine
- Sights: Iron sights

The Interdynamics MKR was a Swedish prototype assault rifle developed in the 1980s. The weapon never proceeded beyond prototype stages.

== Design ==
The Interdynamics MKR was originally designed using a 4.5×26mm MKR round using solid copper bullets. Its purpose was to provide a flat ballistic trajectory along with armor-piercing capabilities with low recoil for the user to handle, even when fired fully automatically. It ejected casings downward behind the magazine.

It was to use low-cost ammunition. The 4.5×26mm MKR round was claimed to be ballistically as effective at 300 meters as the 5.56×45mm NATO round.

It was a bullpup design, which means that the magazine is located behind the trigger, and utilized the blowback system of operation. The bullpup design made the firearm smaller and lighter.

In 2013 a patent by the designer George Kellgren the Interdynamics MKR was a foundational example of a gun that ejected spent casings downward behind the magazine.

== See also ==
- List of bullpup firearms
- List of assault rifles
