= CS/LR17 =

Family of modular automatic rifles

- Place of origin: China

Production history
- Manufacturer: Norinco
- Produced: 2016–present
- Variants: See Variants

Specifications
- Action: gas-operated
- Muzzle velocity: 900 m/s (3,000 ft/s)
- Effective firing range: 500 m (550 yd)
- Feed system: box magazine

The CS/LR17/CS/LR18 Modular Automatic Rifle (Chinese: CS/LR17/18型模块化自動步槍) is a "new generation" family of modular rifles developed by NORINCO with marketing to be done by Jianshe Industry Group.

== History ==
The system was first publicly shown in November 2016 with the 5.56×45mm and 7.62×51mm versions (NAR-556 and 751) first shown. The CS/LR17 series is meant to be marketed to the export market. Their main competitors consist of the AK-12, Galil ACE, HK416/417 and FN SCAR series.

A heavily redesigned variant was shown at the 2018 Zhuhai Airshow.

== Design ==
Development of the CS/LR17/LR18 system first started back in 2014, basing their design on the FN SCAR series. An unnamed UBGL is in development to complement it.

The system consists of three calibers: 5.56×45mm, 7.62×39mm and 7.62×51mm.

== Variants ==
- NAR-556
  - NAR-556/S 5.56×45mm assault rifle
  - NAR-556/CQC 5.56×45mm short barrel variant
  - NAR-556/HB 5.56×45mm sharpshooter rifle
  - NAR-556/LMG 5.56×45mm squad machine gun
- NAR-739
  - NAR-739/S 7.62 X 39mm assault rifle
  - NAR-739/CQC 7.62 X 39mm short barrel variant
  - NAR-739/LMG 7.62 X 39mm squad machine gun
- NAR-751
  - NAR-751/S 7.62×51mm battle rifle
  - NAR-751/CQC 7.62×51mm short barrel variant
  - NAR-751/HB 7.62×51mm sharpshooter rifle
  - NAR-751/LMG 7.62×51mm squad machine gun
