= 4.5×26mm MKR =

Swedish prototype rifle cartridge

4.5mm MKR (synonyms: 4.5mm Interdynamic, 4.5mm Kjellgren)
- L to R: 7.62×51 NATO, 5.56×45 NATO, 4.5×26MKR.
- Type: Rifle
- Place of origin: Sweden

Service history
- In service: Prototypes only.

Production history
- Designed: 1978
- Manufacturer: Interdynamics AB
- No. built: Prototypes only

Specifications
- Parent case: .22 WMR
- Case type: Rimfire, tapered, shoulderless bottleneck
- Bullet diameter: 4.63 mm, 22 mm long, cold-rolled copper, boat-tail spitzer.
- Neck diameter: 5.02 mm
- Shoulder diameter: none
- Base diameter: 6.48 mm
- Rim diameter: 7.44 mm
- Case length: 26.10 mm
- Overall length: 42 mm
- Primer type: Rimfire
- Maximum pressure: 241–276 MPa
- Filling: 0.51 grams tubular nitrocellulose powder or 0.57 grams spherical double-base powder

Ballistic performance
Bullet mass/type	Velocity	Energy
1.58 g (24.4 gr)	1,000 m/s (3,270 ft/s	790 J (583 ft lbs)
- Test barrel length: 640 mm

The 4.5mm MKR, also known as the 4.5mm Interdynamic or 4.5mm Kjellgren, was a Swedish prototype rimfire cartridge developed for the prototype Interdynamics MKR bullpup assault rifle and carbine.

== History ==
The 4.5mm MKR was designed in 1978 by Interdynamic AB, a Swedish company, around the time of the rise of "micro-caliber" popularity. Firearms companies everywhere were trying to achieve a type of practical, light and cheap ammunition. Micro-caliber (less than 5 mm (0.20 in) in diameter) ammunition makers wished to achieve higher velocities, flatter trajectories, and greater penetration while keeping weight and recoil low as possible to facilitate controllable use in individual automatic weapons.

== Design ==
The 4.5mm MKR was essentially a .22 WMR rimfire case necked down from 5.6 mm (0.22 in) to accept a 4.5 mm (0.18 in) bullet, for use in the Interdynamics MKR rifle and carbine. It was supplied in single-use, 50-round polymer magazines. The cartridge featured a curved taper of its body to aid extraction and a short, shoulderless neck. Its 4.5 mm (0.18 in) caliber boat-tail spitzer bullet was 22 mm (0.87 in) long and made by cold rolling solid copper wire.

The lightweight bullet of 1.58 g (24.4 gr) reportedly achieved a muzzle velocity of about 1,000 m/s (3,300 ft/s) and a muzzle energy of 790 J (580 ft⋅lbf). This claim contrasts sharply with the comparable, more modern .17 HMR which has a muzzle energy of 340 J (250 ft⋅lbf). Due to the combination of a thin-walled rimfire case with a high-pressure powder charge, the cartridge needed good external support so the MKR rifle was designed to use locked breech, gas-operated action with a vertically tilting bolt rather than straight blow back operation. This ensured the bolt only opened once cartridge pressure had reduced to safe levels. The rifle and carbine, which differed only in barrel length, were fired from the open bolt position to prevent cook-off ignition of the thin walled cartridges. Users could select from semi-automatic, three-round burst, or fully automatic modes. The burst and fully automatic modes had a high rate of fire of 1800 rounds per minute.

== Performance ==
The 4.5×26 MKR was claimed to be on par with a 5.56×45mm NATO M-193 bullet at up to 300 m (980 ft), while one could carry 3.5 times as many of the lighter weight cartridges. Its slender 4.5 mm (0.18 in) projectile could penetrate a steel helmet up to 300 m (980 ft), out to that range it had a similar ballistic curve to the 5.56×45 NATO with M-193 projectile. This was due to a combination of slightly higher velocity, a similar Ingalls ballistic coefficient to the M-193 bullet (0.245 vs 0.265), and the superior penetrating ability of solid cold-rolled copper bullets vs jacketed lead bullets given an equal sectional density. It was potentially lethal at up to 750 m (2,460 ft) with 80 J (59 ft⋅lbf) and its tendency to tumble on impact was twice that of the 5.56 M-193 bullet, thus ensuring more effective transfer of its diminutive energy to its target, especially as its tip tended to bend. Maximum range was 2,500 m (8,200 ft).

Due to concerns about stopping power, reliability, and the inherent problems with using rimfire ammunition, the MKR project was abandoned at the prototype stage and the 4.5mm MKR never saw service or any kind of widespread use.

=== See also ===
- .17 HMR
