= CS/VP3 MRAP =

Chinese MRAP

CS/VP3 Mine Resistant Ambush Protected Vehicle
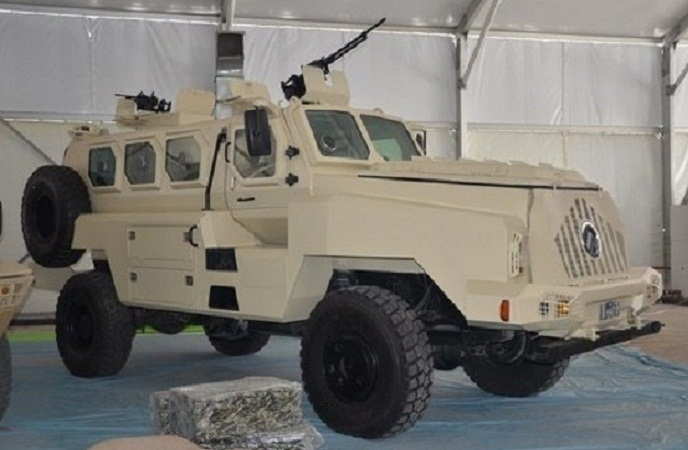
- Place of origin: China

Service history
- In service: 2012-Present
- Used by: See Operators
- Wars: United Nations Multidimensional Integrated Stabilization Mission in Mali; Boko Haram insurgency; Somali–Kenyan conflict

Production history
- Designer: Poly Technologies
- Designed: 2009-2012
- Manufacturer: Changan Automobile
- Produced: 2012-Present

Specifications
- Mass: 15,000 kg (33,000 lb)
- Length: 7.58 m (24.9 ft)
- Width: 2.48 m (8.1 ft)
- Height: 2.90 m (9.5 ft) (without turret)
- Crew: 2
- Passengers: 10
- Main armament: QJC-88 12.7mm HMG
- Secondary armament: Type 86 7.62mm GPMG
- Engine: 1x diesel engine of unknown type and variant 235kw
- Payload capacity: 3,200 kg (7,100 lb)
- Operational range: 800 km (500 miles)
- Maximum speed: 92 km/h (57 mph)

The CS/VP3 MRAP (Chinese: CS/VP3型防地雷反伏击车; pinyin: CS/VP3 xíng fáng dìléi fǎn fújí chē) also known as the CS/VP3 Bigfoot is a MRAP developed by Poly Technologies and manufactured by Changan Automobile in China. It was unveiled in China at the China International Aviation & Aerospace Exhibition 2012 in Zhuhai, China, and overseas at the 2012 DSA defense exhibition in Kuala Lumpur, Malaysia.

== History ==
China's increased operations with the United Nations peacekeeping forces increased its demand for such a vehicle. It has not previously owned a domestically produced MRAP and instead relied on IFVs and APCs to carry out operations.

China began negotiations with privately owned South African company Mobile Land Systems (MLS) in 2009 to develop the CAPRIVI-Mk1 (CS/VP3) MRAP in conjunction with Changan Automobile. At the beginning of 2010, MLS provided Changan Automobile with three CAPRIVI-Mk1s for testing, nine new vehicles in loose parts, and also provided training to Chinese engineers. The total value of the contract was 40 million rand (about $6 million), including the transfer of technology and licenses.

== Design ==
The CS/VP3 is designed to provide secure transportation for combat personnel and equipment under the threat of anti-tank mines. The vehicle is based on a V-shaped hull and a fully-suspended 4x4 all-wheeled arrangement. A V-shaped hull deflects under-vehicle blasts away from its occupants and key driving components.

All-welded steel armour is used, and a ballistic protection level of BR-3 to BR-7 can be customised upon order. The hull can withstand blasts from 8 kg of TNT, and the wheels can withstand blasts from 16 kg of TNT.

The engine compartment is located at the front of the vehicle. The engine is a diesel-fueled engine of unknown make, design, and model, and provides 260 horsepower, allowing the car to reach the maximum speed of 92 km/h. The crew is located in the middle, with the infantry compartment in the rear, with five seats on each side, facing inward. There are many external storage compartments to carry equipment such as ammunition.

The crew cabin has two doors on both sides, and the infantry cabin has one rear door as well as an emergency door to the right.

There are four bulletproof windows on both sides of the vehicle, all with firing ports in the centre. There are two large bulletproof windows in the front of the crew compartment, with a firing port in the bottom-right corner of the right-side window. There is also a bulletproof window in the rear window on the rear door, with a firing port in the middle.

== Operators ==
- China -People's Liberation Army
- Kenya- Kenya Police-25 units delivered in 2018
- Nigeria- Nigerian Army - 40 units delivered in 2018
- Philippines-
  - Philippine Presidential Security Group - 3 units in service. 4 units delivered in 2022 Upon the request of the Duterte Administration . Equipped with Remote controlled weapon station and Electronic Warfare Suite.
  - Philippine Marine Corps- Assault Armour Battalion -1 Unit transferred from Presidential Group.
- Uganda- Uganda National Police- 35 units delivered in 2016
- Zambia- Zambian Army
