= 5.56×30mm MINSAS =

Indian personal defense weapon round

- Type: Personal defense weapon
- Place of origin: India

Service history
- Used by: Indian Armed Forces

Production history
- Designed: 2011
- Manufacturer: Ammunition Factory Khadki

Specifications
- Bullet diameter: 5.56 mm (0.219 in)
- Case length: 30 mm (1.2 in)
- Overall length: 42 mm (1.7 in)

Ballistic performance
| Bullet mass/type | Velocity | Energy |
|---|---|---|
| 2.6 g (40 gr) | 650 m/s (2,100 ft/s) | 550 J (410 ft⋅lbf) |
- Test barrel length: 300mm Source(s)

The 5.56×30mm MINSAS is a firearm cartridge manufactured by India's Ordnance Factory Board (OFB) for close-quarters combat use. It has an effective range of 300 metres (980 ft) and good penetration against body armor. OFB claims it exhibits penetration superior to 9mm.

The MINSAS is being manufactured at Ammunition Factory Khadki in Pune.

== Development ==
The first reports of the MINSAS being developed was from 2009 when the MSMC was announced to be in development. DRDO reported that the MINSAS can penetrate both soft body armor and 3.5 mm MS plates at 100 meters.

It was known as the 5.56×30mm INSAS, named after the planned INSAS carbine.

=== Design ===
The 5.56×30mm MINSAS round has a total length of 42 mm and a total weight of 6 g. The bullet length is 17mm and the weight is 2.6g.

It has a range of up to 200 meters. The cartridge has a muzzle velocity reportedly close to 900 m/s (3,000 ft/s), with a projectile of approximately 2.6 grams (40 grains).

=== Types ===
The MINSAS is available in Ball, Drill, Proof and Blank-type rounds.

== Platforms ==
| Name | Country | Type | Note |
|---|---|---|---|
| Joint Venture Protective Carbine | India | Carbine | |
| Amogh carbine | India | Carbine | |
| Zittara | India (Based on the IWI Tavor) | Carbine | |

== See also ==
- .221 Remington Fireball - similar cartridge
