= Nesterov assault rifle =

Nesterov Assault Rifle
- Type: Assault rifle
- Place of origin: Soviet Union

Production history
- Designer: Azary Nesterov
- Designed: 1961–1970s
- Manufacturer: Izhmash
- Variants: See Variants

Specifications
- Cartridge: 7.62×39mm
- Caliber: 7.62mm
- Action: Gas-operated
- Feed system: 30-round detachable box magazine
- Sights: Iron sights

The Nesterov assault rifle (Russian: Автомат Нестерова) is an assault rifle of Soviet origin.

== Variants ==
=== LA-2 ===
The LA 2 (ЛА-2) is a Carbine. The sample was designed by Izhevsk Machine-Building Plant A. I. Nesterov in 1961 under the influence of plant competition for the AKM. The sample frame limited progress in its rearmost position of the cutting insert receiver. This allowed the elasticity of its walls to reduce the impact of hitting the moving parts in an extreme position on the tip-off weapon. Automatic mode shows improved shooting accuracy. Location of the return spring on the left side of the bolt allowed its height to be reduced along with the height of the arms in general. Shoe flies combine with the gas chamber, with a diopter sight fully posted on the cover of the receiver. A cleaning gas vent at the top of the gas chamber in the firing position is covered by a crane. Weight is reduced to 2.15 kilograms (4.7 lb). Its prototype 1961 magazine capacity was 30 rounds with an effective range of 1,000 meters.

=== LA-3 ===
The LA 3 (ЛА-3) is a Carbine. The LA 3 was designed by B.M. Zorinym in 1962. The rifle stands out for its simplicity. The tests revealed an increased dispersion of the sample by firing bursts, due to the appearance of additional pulses when moving the barrel forward. The prototype 1962 magazine capacity was 30 rounds and offered an effective range of 1,000 meters.

=== LA-4 ===
The LA 4 (ЛА-4) has a Bullpup firearm configuration. The sample was designed by A.I.Nesterov in 1964. The recoil energy is reduced by its long course. The return spring barrel and bolt are located concentrically. One guide rod inside and a spring barrel outside. All parts of the trigger are made by stamping from a sheet. Translator modes of fire and safety are made separately. The sight is placed in the handle. To improve ease of handling of weapons, the control lever is tilted to the right. The prototype's magazine capacity was 30 rounds with an effective range of 1,000 meters.
