= AO-27 rifle =

AO-27
- Type: Assault rifle
- Place of origin: Soviet Union

Production history
- Designer: Dmitry Ivanovich Shiryayev
- Designed: 1961

Specifications
- Mass: 3.2 kg (without rounds)
- Length: 893 mm
- Barrel length: 415 mm
- Caliber: 7.62 mm (3 mm flechette)
- Rate of fire: 700 rounds/min
- Muzzle velocity: 1060 m/s
- Feed system: 30-round detachable box magazine
- Sights: Iron sights

The AO-27 was a Soviet assault rifle, chambered for the 7.62 mm fin-stabilized flechette sabot round. The flechette itself had a body diameter of 3 mm. The overall length of the round was 63 mm, and the flechette 55 mm. The weight of the round was 10.5 grams, with 2.4 grams the weight of the flechette.

== See also ==
- List of assault rifles
