= LSAT light machine gun =

American light machine gun

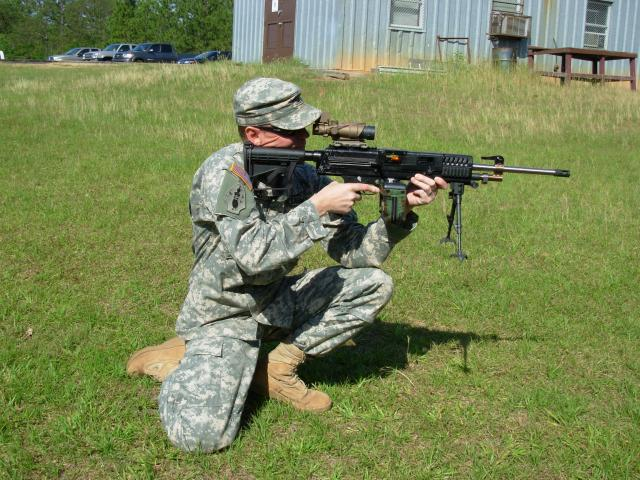
- A US Army soldier shooting a cased telescoped prototype in 2010
- Type: Light machine gun
- Place of origin: United States

Production history
- Designer: AAI Corporation
- Designed: 2003–2017
- Unit cost: ≤US$3600
- Produced: Earliest: 2010
- Variants: Cased telescoped ammunition firing variant Caseless ammunition firing variant

Specifications
- Mass: 9.8 lb (4.4 kg) empty (cased telescoped variant); 9.9 lb (4.5 kg) empty (caseless variant)
- Length: 36.1 in (917 mm) (stock retracted)
- Barrel length: 16.5 in (418 mm) standard 12.5 in (320 mm) compact
- Cartridge: Cased telescoped ammunition LSAT caseless ammunition
- Caliber: 5.56×45mm NATO (at present)
- Action: Gas-piston; push-through feed-and-ejection; open, swinging chamber
- Rate of fire: ≈650 rounds/min
- Muzzle velocity: 920 m/s (3,000 ft/s)
- Effective firing range: ≈1,000 m (1,100 yd)
- Feed system: 100 (cased telescoped) or 150 (caseless) round soft pouches of full-loop-polymer linked, disintegrating belts
- Sights: optical, future variants to include advanced tracking and acquisition

The LSAT light machine gun is a component of the Lightweight Small Arms Technologies (LSAT) program. The purpose of the program was to develop a lighter, yet highly reliable light machine gun (LMG). The program was initiated in 2004, when the Joint Service Small Arms Program (JSSAP) challenged the American defence industry to develop a lighter small arms and also design lighter ammunition.

The LMG provides a major reduction in weight over legacy weapons, as well as improvements in other areas, such as controllability and reliability. As of 2008, it had two configurations, one that fires cased telescoped ammunition, and one that fires caseless ammunition. After further research and development into both technologies and the guns that fire them, one of the two variants was to be chosen for production. By May 2015, 85,000 cased-telescoped rounds had been fired through 10 test weapons, with testers claiming the weapon had gone as far as it can go until the Army decides if it wants to make it a Program of Record.

== History ==
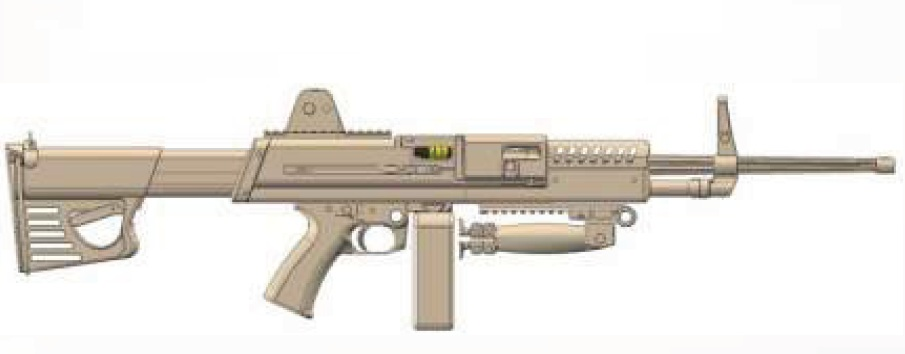
LSAT concept image

Development began with the two types of weight-reducing ammunition, and a light machine gun to serve as a testbed and technology demonstrator. Use of an LMG for this purpose is notable, considering its greater technical complexity than infantry rifles. The use of advanced computer simulations to accelerate development may have mitigated this. For development, the use of extensive computer simulation and modelling reduces both time and expenditure for prototyping and testing. The program also uses a 'spiral development' approach, whereby the weapon and ammunition is rolled out in stages or 'spirals', each stage producing a new version that is an improvement on those from previous spirals. A competition down-selected the design concepts of various companies to leave an AAI Corporation-led team of companies as the developers of the weapon system. The cohesive team of companies is combined with government support to ensure success. The parallel development of the two ammunition types meant that, if the caseless ammunition effort succeeded, much of the development work gained with the composite cased weapon could be applied to it, and, if it failed, the composite-cased version was likely to succeed on its own.

== Design ==
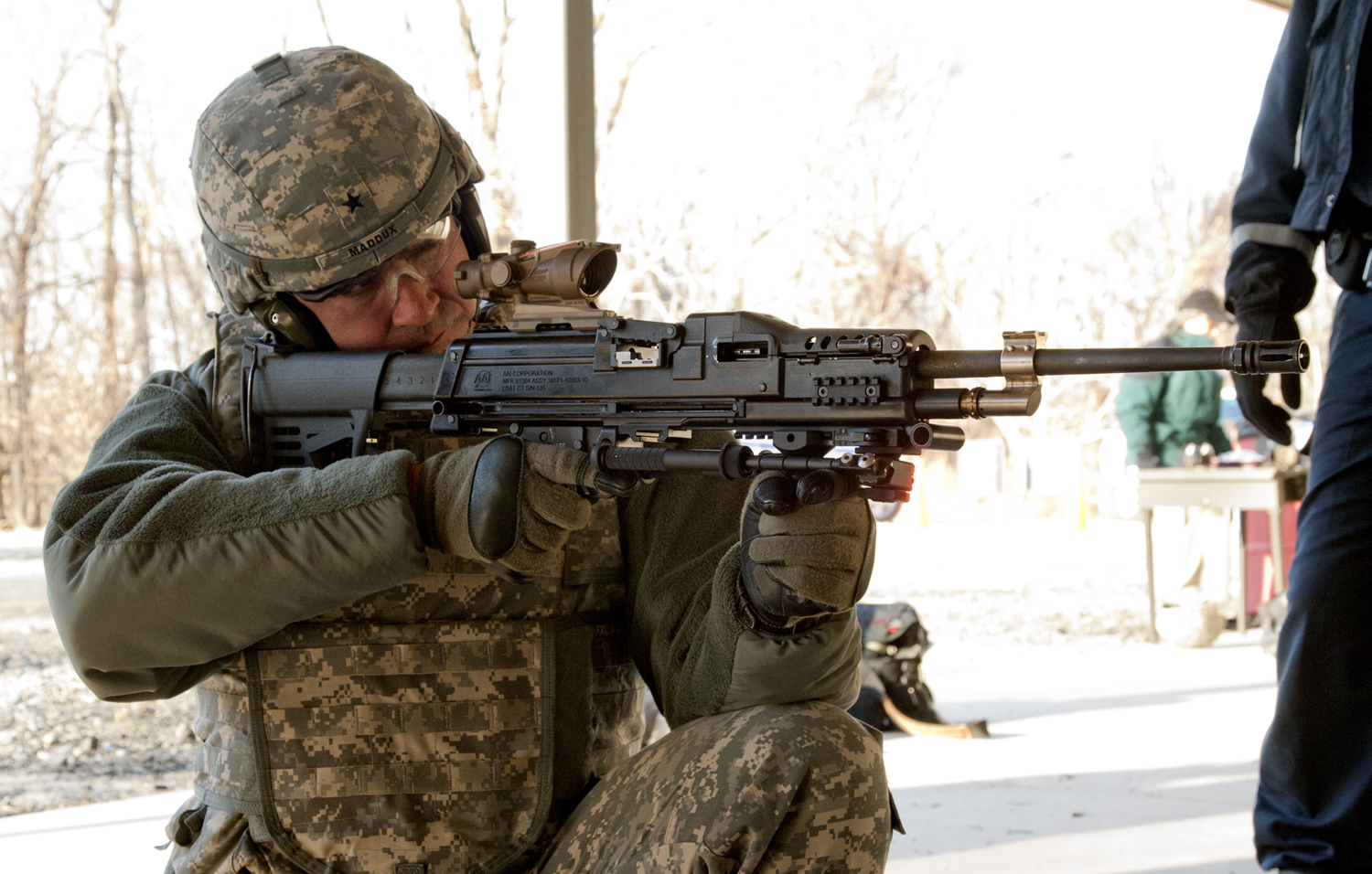
LSAT without magazine, mock fire for the first time by Picatinny Senior Commander and PEO Ammunition Brig. Gen. Jonathan A. Maddux at Picatinny Arsenal

The LMGs built made a 44% and 43% reduction of weight (for the cased telescoped and the caseless weapons, respectively). Secondary goals have also been met: the LMG has the potential to improve battlefield effectiveness (due to its simpler and more consistent weapon action, its light weight and low recoil, and its stiffer barrel); its use of recoil compensation (with a long-stroke gas-system, for example) has produced positive feedback regarding controllability; the simpler mechanism of the LMG is both more reliable and easier to maintain; a rounds counter has been integrated to improve maintainability, and the weapon is capable of accepting other electronic devices; improved materials used in the chamber and barrel have reduced heat load on the weapon; and the weapon cost is equivalent to the existing M249. The standard LSAT machine gun weighs 9.4 lb (4.3 kg) empty, compared to 17.6 lb (8.0 kg) for a standard SAW. Cased telescoped ammunition weighs 40% less than brass-cased ammo, so a 100-round ammunition belt weighs about 2 lb (0.91 kg) for the LSAT, compared to 3.3 lb (1.5 kg) for a brass-cased belt.

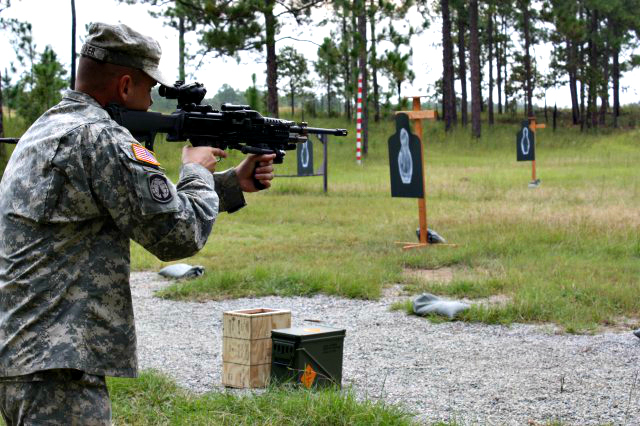
A soldier engages a close range target with the light machine gun during a military unit assessment at Fort Benning, Ga.

The LMG design is a traditionally laid-out machine-gun. It has several features conducive to its use as a light machine gun, such as a quick-change barrel, a vented handguard, a belt feeding mechanism, provisions for the use of an ammunition pouch, and a rate of fire of approximately 600 RPM. Other features include its light weight, an ammunition counter, and a highly stiff and heat resistant barrel achieved with the use of fluting and specialized alloys. When firing, the weapon's chamber swings around a longitudinal pivot; it swings from horizontally parallel with the pivot (the firing position) to vertically parallel (the feed position), and back again. A long-stroke gas-piston is used to operate this action. A round is fed into the chamber at the feed position using a rammer, and the new round also serves to push a spent or dud round out of the far end of the chamber. Such rounds are pushed forward, parallel to the barrel, and they slide into a separate mechanism that ejects them out of one side of the gun. The advantages of this whole action include its simplicity, its isolation of the chamber from barrel heat, and its positive control of round movement from extraction to ejection. In the caseless firing version of the weapon, another mechanism is introduced to seal the chamber during firing, accounting for the slightly increased weight of the caseless version.

== Testing ==
In September 2011, 19 soldiers participated in a two-week assessment of the LSAT light machine gun at Fort Benning, Georgia to demonstrate its capabilities against the M249 SAW. In one test the soldiers, half armed with SAWs and half with LSATs, marched six miles in full combat gear then fired at targets to measure stress and muscle fatigue. Another test had the soldiers sprint 200 yards wearing body armor and a basic load of ammunition, then rapidly engage close-range targets. A third week involved soldiers of the 75th Ranger Regiment performing a squad maneuver live-fire exercise in an urban setting. Feedback from participants favored the LSAT for its lighter weight and decreased recoil. Soldiers remarked the LSAT had better accuracy than the M249. The semi-automatic option made it more viable for room clearing. One Ranger even said the LSAT performed better than the Mk 46 machine gun used by special operations forces. 15 out of 19 soldiers that participated in the assessment said they would prefer using the LSAT in combat rather than the SAW. The LSAT LMG is 41 percent lighter than the 21.5 lb (9.8 kg) SAW and its ammunition volume is 12 percent less, enabling all the soldiers that maneuvered the woodland obstacle course to complete it faster when carrying it. Participants also took less time to zero their machine guns when using the LSAT; one soldier failed repeatedly to accurately zero the SAW but successfully zeroed the LSAT on the first try. The LMG users completed the course, on average, one minute and 11 seconds faster than SAW users due to increased mobility given by its shorter length, adjustable stock, and lighter ammo. When firing, gunners felt virtually no recoil from the LSAT LMG. The eight prototype weapons fired a combined 25,000 rounds, moving its cased telescoped ammunition to technology readiness level 7.

The LSAT light machine gun was assessed in the Army's Dismounted Non-Networked Experiment (DNNE) in August 2013 at Fort Benning. It was among several items showcased at an event at Fort Benning through 24 September 2013 featuring the Army's latest individual and squad kit developments. Seven LSAT LMGs and 9,700 rounds were provided to three rifle squads and one weapon squad at a series of range events. They increased lethality at all ranges with faster speed of engagement and better shot placement, increased the gunner's mobility due to its reduced size and weight, and led to more precision fires in standing and kneeling positions.

== Future improvements ==
The designers project further improvements. These include improved projectile technologies such as environmentally friendly bullets and a change in bullet size in order to increase combat effectiveness, as well as the integration of electronics such as ammunition count readouts, lasers, optical sights, rangefinders, and bullet drop compensation. The Army is pursuing cased telescoped ammunition. This development is far along, and they say a new LMG is fielded in 2022 with unequivocal support. The Marine Corps is pursuing caseless ammunition, which is less developed and will take several more years to refine. A compact version is also being developed with a 4-inch shorter barrel and folding, telescoping buttstock. The 5.56 mm LSAT machine gun has been renamed the Cased Telescoped Light Machine Gun (CT LMG).

On 14 May 2014, Textron Systems was awarded a two-year $5.7 million contract for work that included development of 7.62 NATO cased-telescoped ammunition and an operating mechanism to incorporate into the LSAT machine gun to create a lightweight 7.62 mm version. Textron unveiled their 7.62 mm cased-telescoped machine gun design at the 2015 Special Operations Forces Industry Conference. It weighs 14.5 lb (6.6 kg), almost 8 lb (3.6 kg) lighter than the 22 lb (10.0 kg) M240L and much lighter than the 27 lb (12 kg) M240B. A firing prototype is expected to be ready by fall 2016.

=== 2016 developments ===
During 2016 the LSAT program advanced the 7.62mm LMG to TRL 7, with range testing. It also finished development on the 6.5mm derivative of the 7.62mm CT cartridge and tested that as well. The program had by the end of 2016 demonstrated the target weight savings and moved on to more capable longer range 6.5mm ammunition.

=== 2018 developments ===
In July 2018, the US Army announced a new, different program to develop a replacement for the M249 light machine gun, with six companies, including Textron, competing to develop the Next Generation Squad Weapon Program (NGSW), replacing the SAW, as well as develop ammunition for it that is at least 20% lighter.

Physical requirements stated a target of 12 lb (5.4 kg) and 35 in (890 mm) of length using an Army-desired 6.8mm bullet. The NGSW-AR contracts awarded July 2018 include prototypes and ammunition which would be delivered for Army evaluation in June 2019. Both NGSW-R and NGSW-AR prototypes were to be eventually tested. The NGSW program effectively replaced the LSAT program.

=== 2024 developments ===
As of 2024 Textron has lost the NGSW contract and the M249 will be replaced by the XM250.

== See also ==
- Lightweight Small Arms Technologies
- Lightweight Medium Machine Gun
- MR-C
- Heckler & Koch G11
- M249
- M240
