= AO-35 assault rifle =

Soviet assault rifle

AO-35
- Type: Assault rifle
- Place of origin: Soviet Union

Production history
- Designer: Aleksandr Shilin

Specifications
- Cartridge: 7.62×39mm or 5.45×39mm
- Caliber: 7.62 mm or 5.45 mm
- Action: Gas operated
- Feed system: 30-round detachable box magazine
- Sights: Iron sights

The AO-35 is a prototype assault rifle of Soviet origin. The weapon is an AK-47 derivative using a laminated wood stock to decrease its weight.

A 5.45×39mm version existed; it entered the 1968 trials for the new 5.45×39mm assault rifle, but it was rejected; ultimately the AK-74 was adopted for this role some years later.

== See also ==
- List of assault rifles
