= Amogh carbine =

Indian weapon

Amogh Carbine
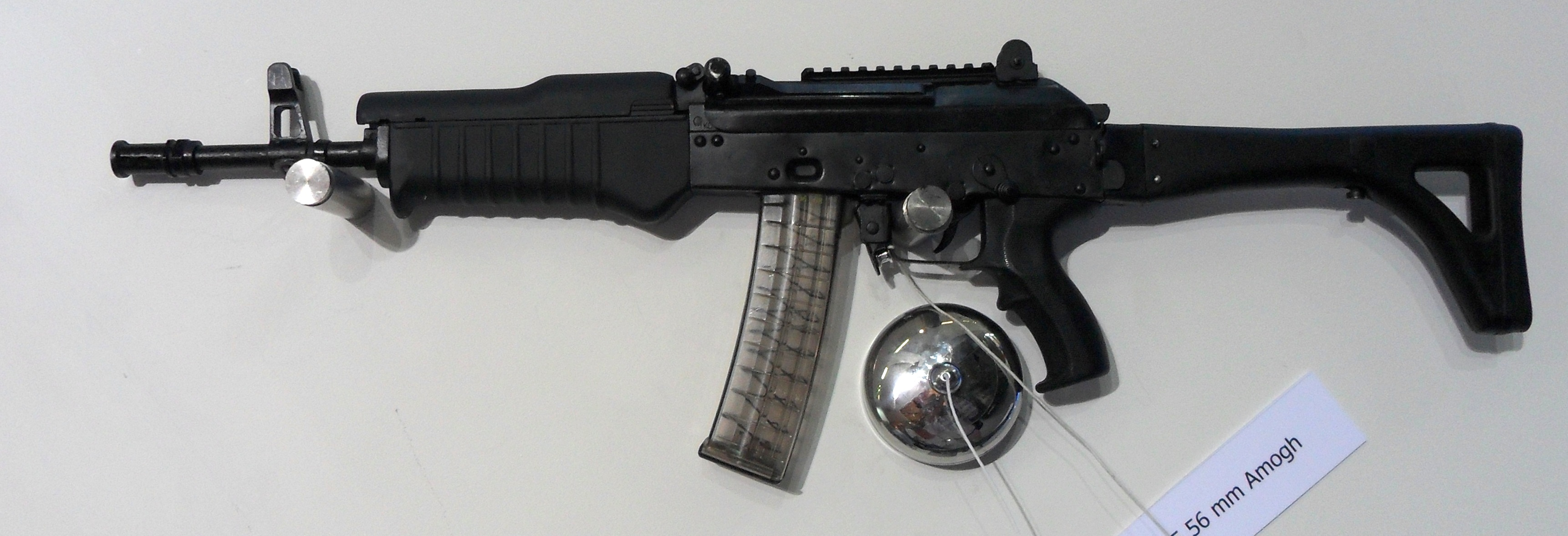
- Amogh carbine on display
- Type: Carbine; Personal defense weapon
- Place of origin: India

Service history
- In service: 2008-Present
- Used by: See Users

Production history
- Designed: 2005
- Manufacturer: Ordnance Factory Board

Specifications
- Mass: 2.95 kg (6.5 lb) empty 3.27 kg (7.2 lb) with 30 rounds
- Length: 800 mm (31 in) (stock extended); 575 mm (22.6 in)
- Barrel length: 330 mm (13 in)
- Cartridge: 5.56×30mm MINSAS
- Caliber: 5.56 mm (.223 in)
- Barrels: 1
- Action: Gas-operated, rotating bolt, Closed Breech
- Rate of fire: 700 round/min cyclic
- Muzzle velocity: 700 m/s (2,300 ft/s)
- Effective firing range: 200 m (220 yd)
- Feed system: 30-round box magazine
- Sights: Open Sights or Reflex sights

The Amogh Carbine (Hindi: अमोघ; meaning unerring) is a select-fire personal defense weapon designed and manufactured by Ordnance Factories Board. It is a derivative of the Excalibur rifle, which in turn is a development of the INSAS rifle.

The Amogh has been designed for close quarters operations.

== History ==
The Amogh was developed in 2005.

From April 21 to 24, 2008, the Amogh was shown at the Defence Services Asia convention. In September 2008, an order was made to supply 148 Amoghs for a cost of 26.64 lakh. An audit revealed in September 2016 that 80 of the carbines were not used due to failure for supplying the needed ammunition for eight years. The carbine was shown to visit during the Aero India 2013 convention.

It has been rejected to be used by the Indian Army after the first trial, although the Indian Coast Guard, navy and some police forces use the carbine.

The carbine was featured in an Indian postage stamp from 25 March 2012.

== Design ==
The carbine was developed by the Ordnance Factory Board and is chambered in 5.56×30mm MINSAS caliber specially developed for carbine role, similar to the MSMC/JVPC. It is a gas operated, long stroke piston with a rotating bolt. Weight of the carbine is 2.95 kg without magazine and has an effective range of 200m along with a rate of fire of 700 rpm.

The receiver is made up of stamped sheet metal, while the hand-guard, pistol grip and side folding stock are made up of black colour, light weight polymer material. It has a 330mm long chrome plated barrel. Feed system is through a 30-round polymer magazine which is translucent to allow the shooter to know the number of rounds left in it. Charging handle is located at the left side of receiver. Magazine release is similar to that of INSAS rifle with magazine catch lever located at the front of the trigger guard.

It has two firing mode single and auto. The carbine has fixed iron sights with front sight (post type) and rear sight (aperture type), there is a small rail on the top cover, which allows the mounting of various optical sights. It has provision of bayonet as an accessory.

== Operators ==
India

- Indian Navy
- Indian Coast Guard
- Manipur Police
- Uttar Pradesh Police

== See also ==
- Joint Venture Protective Carbine
