= 4.6×36mm =

German rifle cartridge

4.6×36 mm
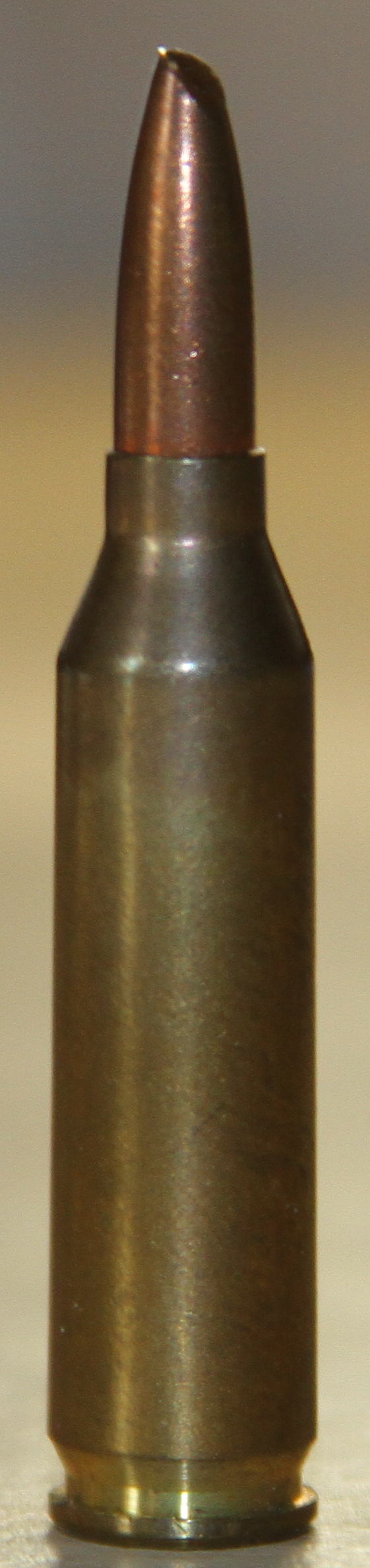
- Type: Rifle
- Place of origin: West Germany

Production history
- Designer: Gunther Voss
- Designed: early 1970s
- Manufacturer: Heckler & Koch
- Produced: 1970s

Specifications
- Case type: Rimless, bottleneck
- Bullet diameter: 4.65 mm (0.183 in)
- Neck diameter: 5.27 mm (0.207 in)
- Shoulder diameter: 8.48 mm (0.334 in)
- Base diameter: 8.94 mm (0.352 in)
- Case length: 35.61 mm (1.402 in)
- Overall length: 49.16 mm (1.935 in)
- Maximum pressure: 353 MPa (51,200 psi)

Ballistic performance
| Bullet mass/type | Velocity | Energy |
|---|---|---|
| 2.70 g (42 gr) FMJ | 857 m/s (2,810 ft/s) | 976 J (720 ft⋅lbf) |
| 3.5 g (54 gr) FMJ | 780 m/s (2,600 ft/s) | 1,065 J (786 ft⋅lbf) |
- Test barrel length: 381 millimetres (15.0 in); Source: Jane's Infantry Weapons 1975

The 4.6×36 mm is a cartridge developed by Heckler & Koch for its experimental HK36 assault rifle of the 1970s. When the rifle was not taken into service by any military force, its ammunition was not used for any other weapon design. The main feature that set the bullet apart from its contemporaries was the use of a so-called "spoon tip" (German: Löffelspitz): the tip had a concave area on one side which was intended to make the bullet "tumble" after hitting a target, in order to give it greater stopping power than such a small, high-velocity bullet would otherwise have.

== Development ==
In the 1970s, ammunition for military rifles saw a reduction in calibre, largely inspired by the American 5.56×45mm round used in the M16 assault rifle. In an effort to create a weapon with low recoil, low weight, a flat trajectory and a high chance of incapacitating its target, Heckler & Koch designed the HK36 rifle together with the 4.6×36 mm ammunition.

== Cartridge Types ==
Two variants of the round were developed, one with a soft core and another with a hard core, the former being intended for use against personnel, the latter against hard targets and to penetrate cover. Both were full-metal-jacketed rounds, the soft-cored bullet having a lead core while that of the hard-cored bullet was made from tungsten carbide.

== Gallery ==
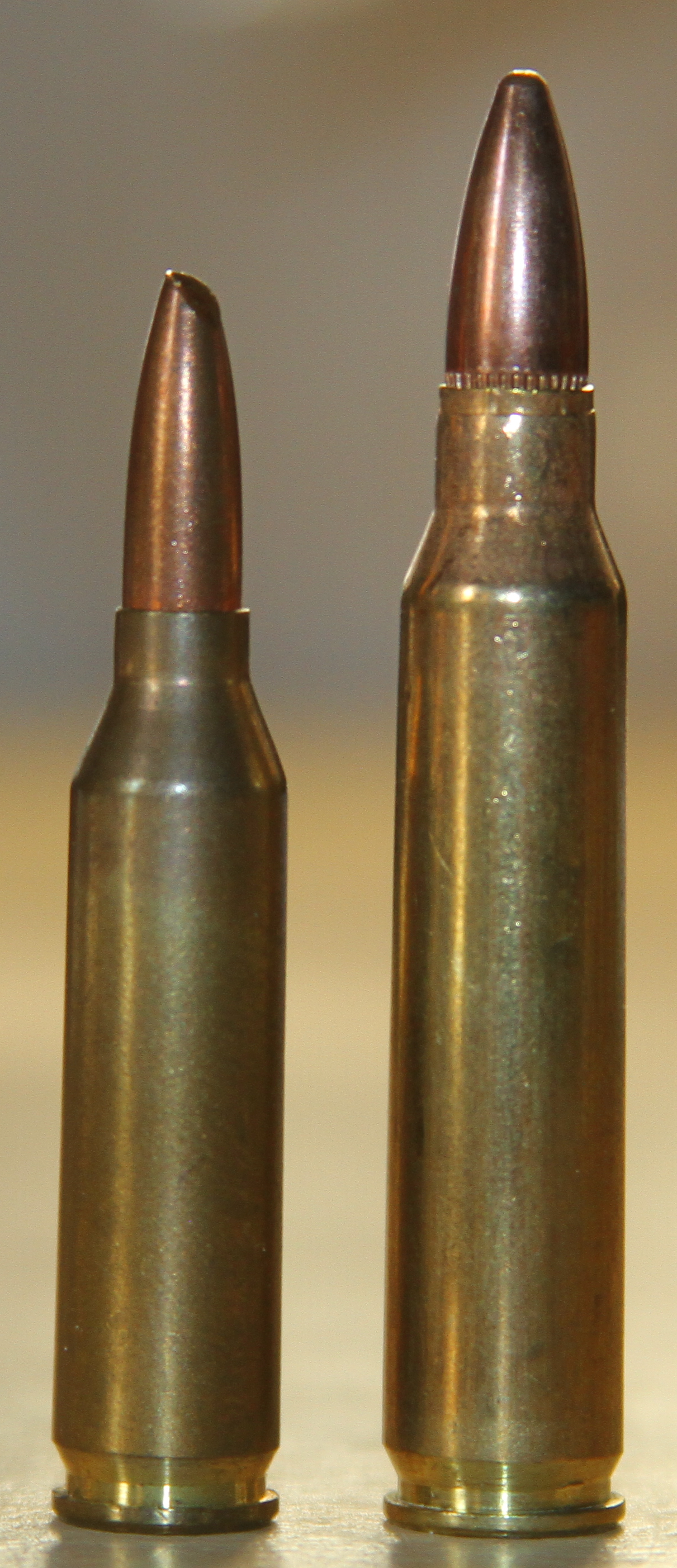
4.6x36mm cartridge next to a .223 Remington cartridge.
