= .345 Winchester Self-Loading =

Rimless rifle fire cartridge

.345 Winchester Self-Loading / 8.8x34mm WSL
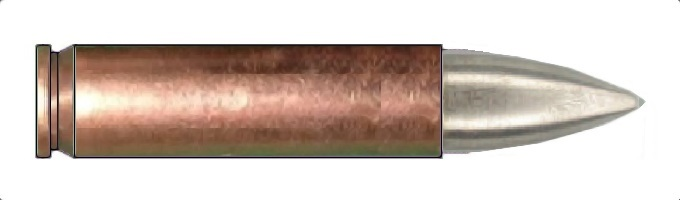
- The .345 Winchester Self-Loading cartridge.
- Type: Rifle
- Place of origin: United States

Production history
- Designer: Winchester Repeating Arms Company

Specifications
- Case type: Semi-rimmed, straight
- Bullet diameter: .345 in (8.8 mm)
- Primer type: Small rifle

The .345 Winchester Self-Loading (.345 WSL / .345 Winchester Machine Rifle) or 8.8x34mm WSL is a rimless, rifle cartridge in a "cylindrical" shape, created in 1917 by the Winchester Repeating Arms Company.

It was designed by Frank F. Burton for the Winchester-Burton Machine Rifle, also known as the Winchester Model 1917. While few original documents pertaining to the rifle have survived, it was probably intended primarily for use as an anti-balloon weapon, while fitted to aircraft. However, an alternate barrel with a bayonet attachment, for use by infantry, was also designed.

== History ==
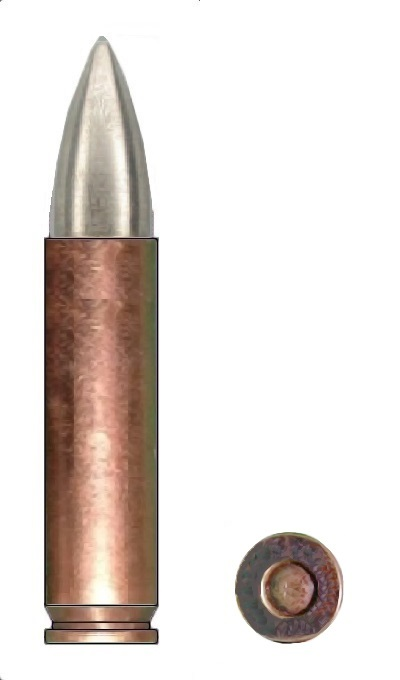
The .345 Winchester Self-Loading cartridge.

During the outbreak of the First World War, observation balloons were essential for both sides of the front. These static balloons inflated with hydrogen, became targets for airmen on both sides, and were defended by anti-aircraft batteries and patrol fighters.

To face these balloons, conventional ammunition proved to be inefficient, and other alternatives were sought. In 1916, French officer Yves le Prieur created a rocket system powered by electricity, but its range was limited. In 1917, tracer and incendiary ammunition was being developed to target these balloons.

To meet this need, Frank F. Burton of Winchester, developed the "Burton Light Machine Rifle", a selective fire blowback rifle, with selection of rate of fire to be used in observation and surveillance planes, the first practical version of which was ready in 1917. For this rifle, he adapted the .351 WSL cartridge into a rimless cartridge, firing an incendiary Spitzer bullet, resulting in the .345 Winchester Self-Loading.

== Dimensions ==
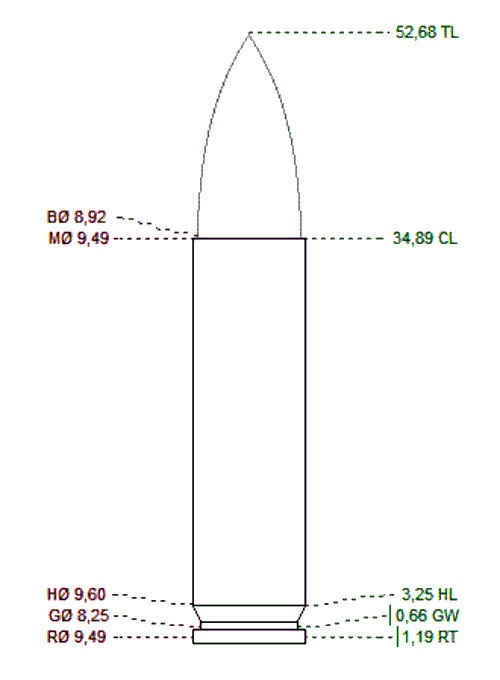

== See also ==
- 9 mm caliber
- .35 Remington
- List of rifle cartridges
- Table of handgun and rifle cartridges
