= Heckler & Koch HK36 =

- Type: Assault rifle
- Place of origin: West Germany

Production history
- Designer: Müller
- Designed: early 1970s
- Manufacturer: Heckler & Koch
- Variants: models with fixed and folding stock known to exist, as are models with detachable box magazine

Specifications
- Mass: 2.85 kg (6.28 lb) empty, 3.14 kg (6.92 lb) loaded
- Length: 79.7 cm (31.4 in) with stock retracted, 89.0 cm (35.0 in) with stock extended
- Barrel length: 38.1 cm (15.0 in)
- Cartridge: 4.6×36 mm
- Caliber: 4.6 mm (0.18 in)
- Action: Roller delayed blowback
- Rate of fire: 1100–1200 rounds/min cyclic
- Muzzle velocity: 857 m/s (2,812 ft/s) (soft-core bullet), 780 m/s (2,559 ft/s) (hard-core bullet)
- Effective firing range: 300 m (328 yd)
- Feed system: Integral box magazine loaded from 30-round, pre-loaded, disposable box (early models used detachable box magazine)
- Sights: Reflex with daylight screen and Beta light

The HK36 was an experimental assault rifle introduced by Heckler & Koch in the early 1970s. At the time, research in small-caliber military cartridges had become more popular thanks to the United States' adoption and combat use of the M16 and its 5.56×45mm round.

The HK36 rifle fired a 4.6×36 mm round whose bullet has a "spoon point" (German: Löffelspitz) designed by CETME's Dr. Gunther Voss. Low bullet weight and the straight-line layout of the rifle reduced recoil, while the high velocity of the round gave it an almost flat trajectory out to 300 metres (330 yd), which was also the limit of its effective range. Beyond that point, the bullet lost velocity very quickly.

== Operation ==
The HK36 used H&K's delayed blowback system, with a four-position selector switch for the firing mode. In order from top to bottom, these were safe (marked "0"), single-shot ("1"), full-automatic ("25" or "30") and controlled burst ("3")—however, the weapon was intended to be available with 2-, 3-, 4- or 5-round burst mode.

Ejection of empty cartridge cases was to the right, while the bolt remained open once all ammunition had been expended.

== Magazine ==
Early versions of the weapon had a standard detachable box magazine made from stamped metal.

The method of reloading for the later prototypes was an unusual departure from modern systems, being intended to reduce weight along with eliminating the handling of individual rounds. The rifle had a metal box mounted permanently below the receiver, in front of the trigger guard; this magazine had a side-opening "door" through which a pre-packaged box of 30 cartridges could be inserted once a knob on the rifle had been pulled down. The box had an open top and bottom, closed by tape, so that the magazine follower could push the rounds up into the rifle during firing.

== Variants ==
As mentioned, initial models used a conventional detachable box magazine while later versions had the integral one. In addition, most of the rifles appear to have been fitted with a telescoping stock of a completely different type than that fitted to most other Heckler & Koch weapons (such as the G3 and MP5), but some are known with a fixed, plastic stock.

== See also ==
- List of assault rifles
