= Joint Venture Protective Carbine =

Indian submachine gun

Joint Venture Protective Carbine Modern Submachine Carbine
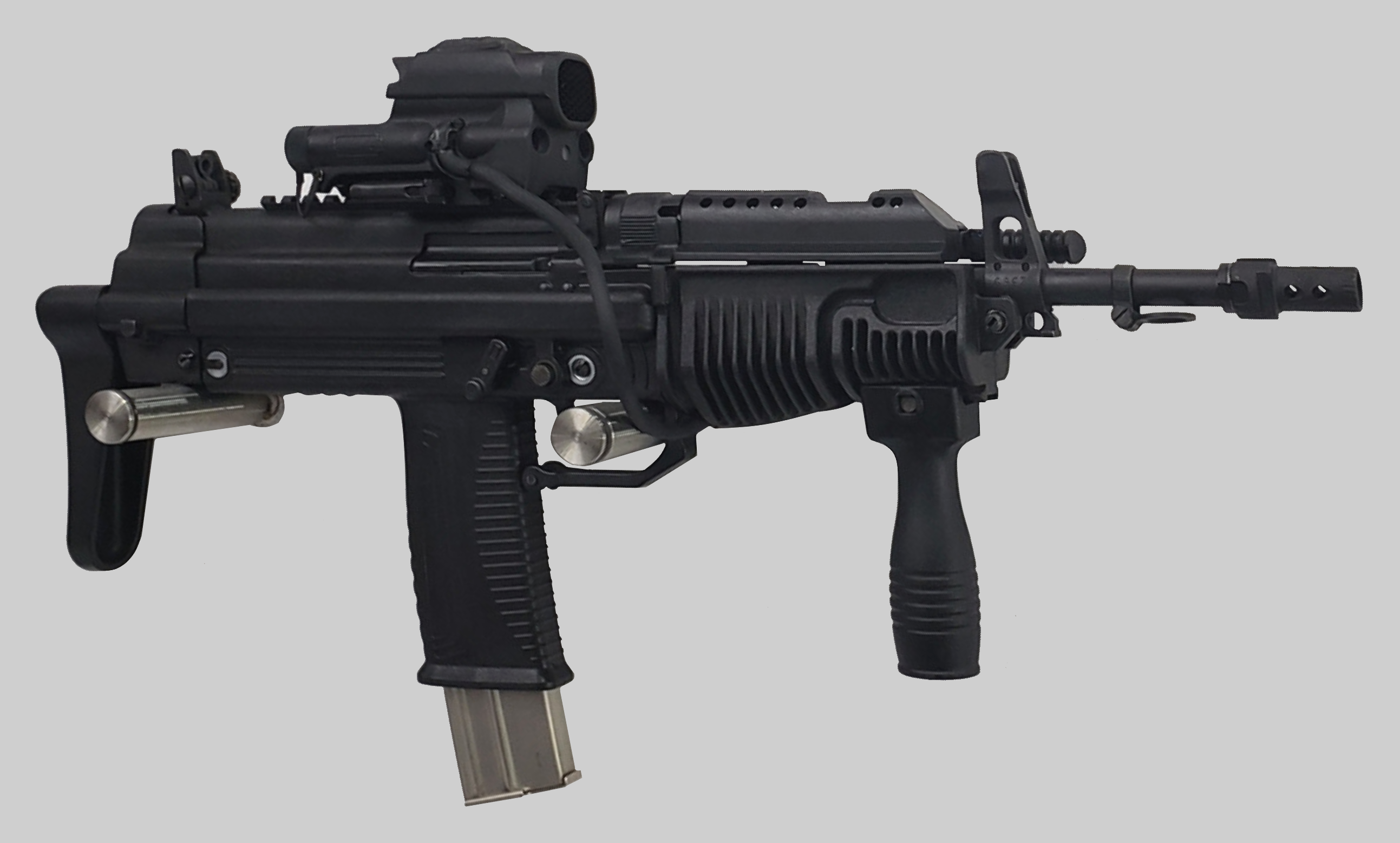
- MSMC submachine gun
- Type: Carbine
- Place of origin: India

Service history
- Used by: See operators

Production history
- Designed: 2005
- Manufacturer: Advanced Weapons and Equipment India Limited; Kalyani Strategic Systems Limited
- Produced: Since 2005

Specifications
- Mass: 2.98 kg (6.6 lb) empty
- Length: 552 mm (21.7 in) closed stock 745 mm (29.3 in) open stock
- Barrel length: 300 mm (12 in)
- Cartridge: 5.56×30mm MINSAS
- Caliber: 5.56 mm (0.219 in)
- Action: Gas operated, long stroke piston rotating bolt
- Rate of fire: 800–900 round/min
- Effective firing range: 200–300 m (220–330 yd)
- Feed system: 30 round box magazine
- Sights: Iron sights, reflex sights, IR sights, laser sights

The Joint Venture Protective Carbine (JVPC), also known as Modern Sub Machine Carbine (MSMC) until 2014, is a gas-operated, magazine-fed, select fire carbine designed to chamber the 5.56×30mm MINSAS cartridge. It was designed by the Armament Research and Development Establishment of the Defence Research and Development Organisation, and manufactured by Advanced Weapons and Equipment India Limited and by Kalyani Strategic Systems Limited. It was intended as a replacement for the 9mm Sterling submachine gun in service with the Indian Armed Forces.

The development of the JVPC began in 2010, being an offshoot of the INSAS small arms program. Its trials were commenced in 2016 and completed in 2021. The JVPC cleared the final phase of user trials by the Indian Army. The weapon's accuracy and reliability were tested in extreme hot weather and high-altitude winter conditions, by the Army's user trials.

The JVPC already cleared user trials conducted by the Ministry of Home Affairs and is currently being procured for the Central Armed Police Forces (CAPF) and State Police Forces in the country.

== History ==
The development of a carbine was one of the objectives of the Indian Small Arms System (INSAS) programme, which developed the INSAS assault rifle. An INSAS based carbine said to have been developed in early 2000s, but was rejected. The INSAS based carbine was designed to chamber the same 5.56×45mm NATO cartridge used in the INSAS assault rifle and the LMG, hence it had a higher recoil than a carbine of its size should normally have. In 2002, the Indian Army has issued a General Staff Qualitative Requirement (GSQR) for a new submachine carbine with revised specification. In response to the new GSQR, both OFB and ARDE independently developed two carbines – Amogh carbine and MSMC respectively.

Both carbines were designed to chamber much lighter 5.56×30mm MINSAS cartridge. The prototypes underwent a series of trials – first in 2006, then in late 2007 and finally in early 2009. Both of the carbines failed to meet the requirement set by the Army. In 2010, DRDO's ARDE lab and OFB collaborated to iron out the problems with the MSMC design. The redesigned MSMC was now redesignated as Joint Venture Protective Carbine or JVPC. The prototypes of JVPC was offered to the Army for user trials in 2013. Also in this time period an exigency for a carbine has arisen.

The user trials by Indian Army commenced in 2016 and completed by 2021. The JVPC was subjected to accuracy and reliability test at extreme temperature conditions of India. The final user trials were conducted at the sub-zero cold desert of Ladakh.

The JVPC was earlier cleared user trials by CAPF. In 2017, the then-Union Home Minister Rajnath Singh ceremonially accepted a JVPC from the then-Minister of Defence Nirmala Sitharaman, marking its service induction into the CAPF, Paramilitary forces and Police forces under the Ministry of Home affairs. The JVPC is currently being procured for the CAPF.

The AWEIL-made JVPC was displayed in public at the DSEI 2023 convention in the UK.

According to the Advanced Weapons and Equipment India Limited 2021–2022 Annual Report, around 6,000 JVPCs were supplied.

== Design ==
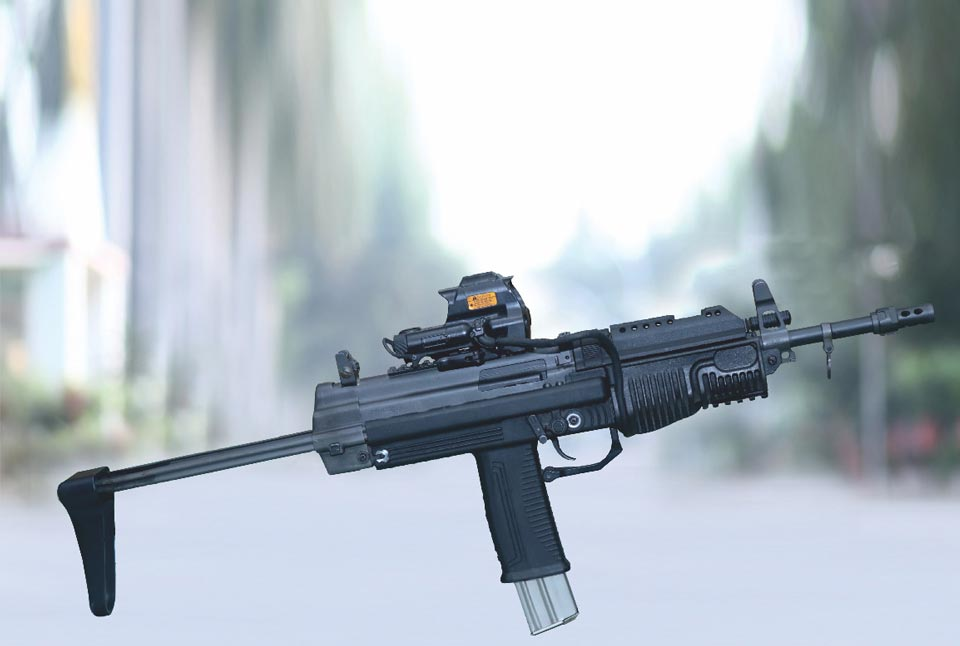
MSMC/JVPC equipped with BEL Trinetra reflex sight

The MSMC or JVPC is a highly compact weapon that is less than 22 inches long with the stock collapsed, making it ideal for personal defence, close quarter battle and counter insurgency/counter terrorism operations. Like machine pistols such as the Uzi, the JVPC has a pistol grip with a magazine well. A 30-round MSMC magazine is inserted through this pistol grip.

The JVPC's ergonomic pistol grip design, low recoil and compact size allows the user to fire it like a pistol. It has a retractable stock and ambidextrous fire selector located above the trigger. The upper receiver of the prototypes were made of stamped metal sheet, while production models are manufactured using metal injection molding technique. It has multiple MIL-STD-1913 picatinny rail system – one on the upper receiver for mounting modern optics and sights and one on the lower for mounting forward hand grip. The lower receiver is mostly made of polymer.

The JVPC has an overall length of 745 mm when stock is extended and 552 mm when stock is collapsed, making it a highly compact weapon. It has a barrel length of 300 mm and an effective range of 200 to 300 metre. JVPC has provision to equip barrel attachments such as suppressor and bayonet. The JVPC is designed to fire 5.56×30mm MINSAS round and have a muzzle velocity of 650 meters per second. The 5.56×30mm ammunition used in JVPC is said to be superior to both FN 5.7×28mm and HK 4.6×30mm cartridges.

The JVPC has a gas operated rotating bolt mechanism and features two modes of fire – single and full auto, which fires at a rate of 800 to 900 round/min.

== Operators ==
Final trials by Indian Army was successfully completed in Dec 2020

India

- Central Industrial Security Force
- Central Reserve Police Force
- Chhattisgarh Police
- Delhi Police
- Special Protection Group - In 2019 December 2 issue of the Mail Today, journalist Sandeep Unnithan reported that JVPC has cleared user trials by Special Protection Group and likely to get an order from the aforementioned unit.
- Indian Army - JVPC cleared the General Staff Qualitative Requirement set by the Indian Army, with the final trial in December 2020. This paves the way for JVPCs induction into the Indian Army.

== Popular culture ==
The Modern Sub Machine Carbine first appeared in Call of Duty: Black Ops 2.
