= Nylatron =

Tradename for a family of nylon plastics

Nylatron is a tradename for a family of nylon plastics, typically filled with molybdenum disulfide lubricant powder. It is used to cast plastic parts for machines, because of its mechanical properties and wear-resistance.

Nylatron is a brand name of Mitsubishi Chemical Advanced Materials, Inc. and was originally developed and manufactured by Nippon Polypenco Limited.

Nylatron is used in several applications such as:

- rotary lever actuators where unusual shapes are required
- heavy-duty caster wheels, normally as a replacement for cast iron or forged steel
- plain bearing material, especially in screw conveyor applications
