= AK Alfa =

CAA AK Alfa
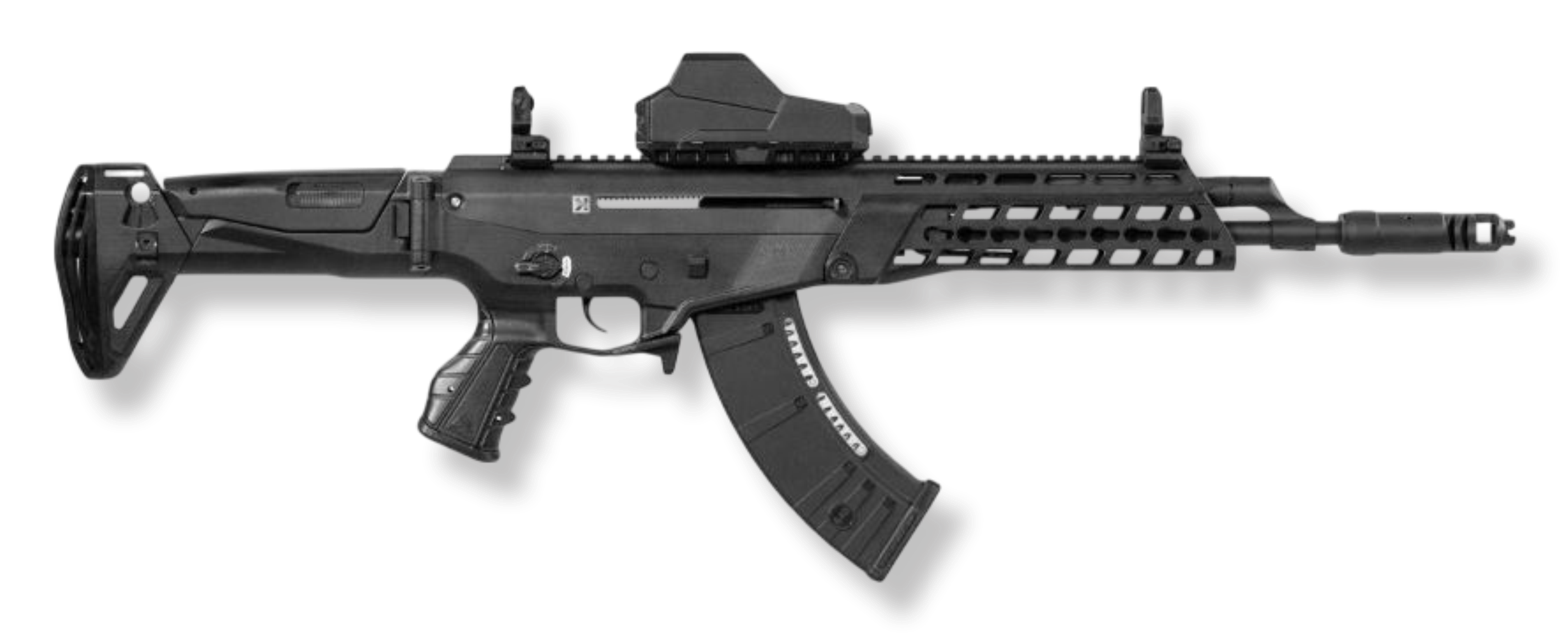
- Type: Semi-automatic rifle
- Place of origin: Israel

Service history
- In service: 2019-Present
- Used by: Nigerian Army

Production history
- Designer: Command Arms and Accessories
- Manufacturer: Command Arms and Accessories
- Produced: 2016-Present

Specifications
- Mass: 3,75kg (AGS variant)
- Length: 850mm
- Barrel length: 315mm
- Caliber: 5.45×39mm 7.62×39mm 5.56×45mm NATO.308 Winchester; 9×19mm Parabellum (AK Alfa AK-9)

The CAA AK Alfa is a semi-automatic rifle developed in 2016 by Israeli firearms company CAA, via its subsidiary "Kalashnikov Israel".

== History ==
According to the CEO of CAA, Moshe Oz, the idea of the AK Alfa came in 2011 during a business trip to Russia, where he was marketing another of CAA's products.

Development of the AK Alfa began in 2014. CAA planned to combine the Kalashnikov mechanism with a modern frame. In 2015, the company received authorization to manufacture small arms.

The AK Alfa was unveiled in 2016's SHOT Show by Kalashnikov USA (then also owned by CAA's CEO, Moshe Oz), alongside Kalashnikov's KR-9, which the intention of selling the AK Alpha on the US civilian market, appearing again in the 2017 edition of SHOT show.

The company claims to have sold thousands of AK Alfa units to government clients around the world. In 2019, the AK Alfa was seen being used by Nigerian Army special forces.

== Operators ==
- Nigeria: Used by Special Forces.
