= MR-C =

Modular Rifle - Caseless
- Type: Concept Assault Rifle
- Place of origin: United States

Production history
- Designer: Crye Associates
- Designed: Circa 2005

Specifications
- Cartridge: 6.8mm Caseless
- Action: Gas-operated reloading
- Rate of fire: 800 rounds/min
- Feed system: 45- or 50-round magazine

The Modular Rifle - Caseless (MR-C), is a mock-up of an assault rifle that was intended to be manufactured and sold to the United States military as a next-generation infantry weapon firing next-generation ammunition. It has not been developed—even in prototype form—and the weapon was never lined-up for the OICW competition or in follow-up rifle competitions held by the US military. On the Crye Associates website, the product is specifically labeled as a "modular caseless carbine mock-up". Most information circulating on the rifle is derived from the video game Tom Clancy's Ghost Recon: Advanced Warfighter, and should not be taken as fact.

Designed by Crye Associates, the concept is shown to utilize a bullpup design with an all-sides rail interface system. It is also shown to have a special 40 mm grenade launcher attachment known as the AGL. The AGL in the game, however, is a modified version of the real world Enhanced Grenade Launcher Module designed for the FN SCAR rifles. In most of the pictures, the gun is seen painted in Crye Precision's Multicam pattern.

== See also ==
- Future Force Warrior
- Heckler & Koch G11
