= LSAT caseless ammunition =

Type of caseless ammunition

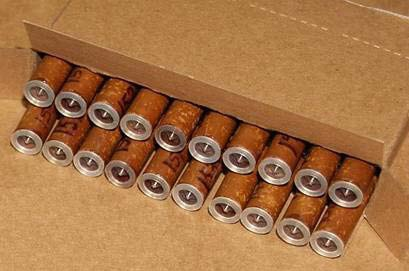
5.56mm LSAT Caseless Ammunition for the LSAT LMG

LSAT caseless ammunition is caseless ammunition produced as part of the U.S. Army’s Lightweight Small Arms Technologies (LSAT) program.

Although less advanced in development than the other ammunition component of the program, the caseless round has already produced significant results. Having replicated Dynamit Nobel's ACR ammunition, the HITP (High Ignition Temperature Propellant, which is hexogen/octogen-based to decrease heat sensitivity) ammunition was modified to a 5.56 mm round. Tests proved the ammunition's usability, and development of the weapon was advanced using knowledge gained from the cased version.

== History ==
The Alliant Techsystems ammunition production team cut production time and costs by reducing the number of steps used to complete processing from fourteen to two. The second spiral of caseless ammunition was rolled out in 2008, with the necessary facilities to produce the ammunition in bulk completed. It reduced the weight and volume of standard ammunition (by 51% and 40%, respectively), and it neared Technology Readiness Level 5. The development of the third spiral was initiated, with the goal of developing a cheaper and more environmentally friendly binder. It also aimed to reduce heat ablation on the inside of the weapon by modifying the propellant's burn rate, and by giving the round an exterior coating to absorb or prevent transferred heat.

Caseless ammunition also produces no ejected shells, which improves the weapon's resistance against environmental contamination, and it eliminates the need to collect and recycle empty brass, as is needed with current firearms.

In August 2013, AAI Corporation was awarded a $2.05 million contract to continue developing parts of the LSAT program. Part of the contract is to refine 5.56 mm caseless ammunition prototypes for testing. The caseless ammunition effort will focus on improving propellant and ignition formulations in a 5.56 mm configuration.

== See also ==
- Caseless ammunition
