= List of 7.62×39mm firearms =

The below table gives a list of firearms that can fire the 7.62×39mm cartridge, first developed and used by the Soviet Union in the late 1940s. The cartridge is widely used due to the worldwide proliferation of Russian SKS and AK-47 pattern rifles, as well as RPD and RPK light machine guns.

This table is sortable for every column.

Name	Type	Country	Image	Years of service	Notes
Steyr AUG	Assault rifle	AUT		2025–present	7.62×39mm variant of Steyr AUG.
AR-M1	Assault rifle	BUL		1998–present	7.62×39mm variant of AR-M1 rifle, copy of the AK-47 and AK-74.
Type 38 rifle	Bolt-action rifle	China		1950s–1960s	Rechambered from the original 6.5×50mmSR Arisaka.
Type 56 carbine	Semi-automatic rifle	China		1956–present	Licensed variant of SKS.
Norinco SKS-M	Semi-automatic rifle	China		1980s–present	Commercial variant of the Type 56 carbine.
Norinco Type 86S	Bullpup semi-automatic rifle	China		1986–present	Based on the Type 56 assault rifle.
Type 56 assault rifle	Assault rifle	China		1956–present	Variant of the AK-47 and AKM.
Type 63 assault rifle	Assault rifle	China		1963–present	Based on the Type 56 carbine and Type 56 assault rifle.
Type 81 assault rifle	Assault rifle	China		1983–present	
vz. 52/57	Semi-automatic rifle	Czechoslovakia		1957–1959	7.62×39mm variant of vz. 52 rifle.
vz. 58	Assault rifle	Czechoslovakia		1959–present	
CZ BREN 2	Assault rifle	CZE		2011–present	7.62×39mm variant of CZ. BREN 2 rifle.
MPi-KM	Assault rifle	East Germany		1964–present	Licensed variant of AKM.
Maadi arm	Assault rifle	Egypt		1960–present	Indigenous version of the Soviet AKM rifle.
Rasheed Carbine	Semi-automatic rifle	Egypt		1960–present	Derived from Hakim Rifle.
RK 62	Assault rifle	Finland		1965–present	Based on the Polish licensed variant of AK-47.
Valmet M-76	Semi-automatic Assault rifle	Finland		1972–present	Civilian semi-automatic variant of the RK 62.
RK 95 TP	Assault rifle	Finland		1990–present	
Sako M90 (M92S & M95S)	Semi-automatic Assault rifle	Finland		1993–present	Civilian semi-automatic variant of the RK 95.
KK 62	Light machine gun	Finland		1962–present	
AMD-65	Assault rifle	Hungary		1967–present	Licensed variant of AKM.
AMP-69	Assault rifle	Hungary		1974–present	Licensed variant of AKM.
AK-63	Assault rifle	Hungary		1977–present	Licensed variant of AKM.
Tabuk Sniper Rifle	Designated marksman rifle	Iraq		1978–present	Modified version of Zastava M70.
KLS KLF KLT	Assault rifle	IRN		?	Iranian versions of the AK platform modeled after the Type 56, MPi-KMS 72 and the AKM.
AK-113	Assault rifle	IRN		2018–present	Iranian versions of the AK-103.
IWI Galil ACE	Assault rifle	Israel		2008–present	7.62×39mm variant of IWI Galil ACE.
Beretta ARX160	Assault rifle	ITA		2008–present	7.62×39mm variant of Beretta ARX160.
Type 58 assault rifle	Assault rifle	North Korea		1958–present	Variant of the AK-47 and type 56.
Kbkg wz. 1960	Assault rifle	Poland		1960–present	Variant of the AK-47.
Beryl M762	Assault rifle	Poland		1995–present	
PM md. 63	Assault rifle	Romania		1963–present	Licensed variant of AKM.
OTs-14-1A Groza-1	Bullpup assault rifle	Russia		1994–1999	Based on the AKS-74U.
AK-103	Assault rifle	Russia		2001–present	
AK-104	Carbine assault rifle	Russia		2001–present	
AK-15	Assault rifle	Russia		2016–present	7.62×39mm variant of AK-12.
KORD 6P68	Assault rifle	Russia		2018–present	
AK-203	Assault rifle	Russia		2022–present	Upgraded version of the AK-103.
RPL-7	Light machine gun	RUS		2020–present	
A-91	Assault rifle	Soviet Union		1990–present	
SKS	Semi-automatic rifle	Soviet Union		1946–present	
AK-47	Assault rifle	Soviet Union		1947–present	
AKM	Assault rifle	Soviet Union		1959–present	Improved variant of the AK-47.
AKMSU	Carbine assault rifle	Soviet Union Pakistan		1980	
AS-44	Assault rifle	Soviet Union		1944–1945	
Dlugov assault rifle	Assault rifle	Soviet Union		1953	Prototype only.
TKB-011	Assault rifle	Soviet Union		1963	
TKB-022PM	Assault rifle	Soviet Union		1962	
TKB-059	Assault rifle	Soviet Union		1960	Prototype only.
TKB-408	Assault rifle	Soviet Union		1946	Prototype only.
TKB-415	Assault rifle	Soviet Union		1946	
TKB-517	Assault rifle	Soviet Union		1952	Prototype only.
RPD	Light machine gun	Soviet Union		1944–present	
RPK	Light machine gun	Soviet Union		1961–present	
DAK-47	Assault rifle	South Korea		2019–present	Licensed variant of AK-47.
DSAR47	Assault rifle	South Korea		2020–present	7.62×39mm variant of the AR15.
Zastava M19	Carbine modular assault rifle	Serbia		2022–present	Based on the FN SCAR.
Malyuk	Bullpup Assault rifle	UKR		2015–present	7.62×39mm variant of Malyuk.
M4-WAC-47	Assault rifle	UKR		2018–present	
Colt CM901	Assault Rifle	United States		2013–present	Its semi-automatic variant is the LE901-16S.
Ruger Mini Thirty	Semi-automatic rifle	United States		1987–present	7.62×39mm variant of Ruger Mini-14.
WASR-10	Semi-automatic rifle	Romania; United States		1996–present	Semi-automatic variant of PM md. 63 for United States civilian market.
CMMG Mk47 Mutant	Semi-automatic rifle	United States		2014–present	Derivative of AR 15.
Desert Tech MDR	Assault rifle	United States		2014	7.62×39mm variant of Desert Tech MDR.
SR-47	Assault rifle	United States		2001	7.62×39mm variant of the AR15.
SIG MCX	Assault rifle	United States			7.62×39mm variant of the MCX.
STV rifle	Assault rifle	Vietnam		2019–present	Licensed variant of IWI Galil ACE.
STL-1A	Assault rifle	Vietnam		2019–present	Vietnamese copy of AKM.
Zastava M59/66	Semi-automatic rifle	Yugoslavia		1964–present	Licensed variant of SKS.
Zastava M70	Assault rifle	Yugoslavia		1970–present	Unlicensed derivative of AK-47.
Zastava M72	Light machine gun	Yugoslavia		1973–present	
Zastava M92	Carbine assault rifle	Yugoslavia; Serbia		1992–present	Variant of Zastava M70.
Zastava M21A	Carbine assault rifle	Yugoslavia; Serbia	M21A (On Top) and M72 LMG (On Bottom)	2005–present	7.62×39mm variant of the Zastava M21.

== See also ==
- List of assault rifles
- List of 7.62×54mmR firearms
- List of 5.56×45mm NATO firearms
- 5.45×39mm
- 5.8×42mm
