= TKB =

TKB can refer to:

- The MIPT Terrorism Knowledge Base, commonly abbreviated as TKB
- Ting Kau Bridge, a cable-stayed bridge in Hong Kong
- TKB, the TasKBuilder program for the RSX-11 computer operating system
- Japanese slang for a nipple

TKB (Tulskoye Konstruktorskoye Byuro / Tula Design Bureau) is the prefix for a series of weapons created by TsKIB SOO:

- TKB-09/010
- TKB-011
- TKB-022PM
- TKB-059
- TKB-072
- TKB-408
- TKB-506
- TKB-517
- TKB-523
- TKB-0146
- TKB-0216
