= TsKIB SOO =

Russian small arms design bureau

- Industry: Arms industry
- Founded: 1946
- Headquarters: Tula, Russia
- Products: Firearms, Autocannons, CIWS, Aircraft cannons, Grenade launchers
- Parent: KBP Instrument Design Bureau
- Website: www.tulatskib.ru

The Central Design and Research Bureau of Sporting and Hunting Arms (Russian: Центральное конструкторско-исследовательское бюро спортивного и охотничьего оружия), abbreviated TsKIB SOO (Russian: ЦКИБ СОО) is a Russian small arms design bureau based in Tula, Russia. It was established in 1946, and it is currently managed as a branch of the KBP Instrument Design Bureau.

== Products ==
Notable products designed at TsKIB SOO include:

- high-quality custom hunting shotguns (MTs 5, MTs 6, MTs 7, MTs 8, MTs 30, MTs 109, MTs 110, MTs 111, MTs255, etc.)
- TKB-022PM, TKB-0146, TKB-408, TKB-517 assault rifle prototypes
- TKB-015A, GPMG prototype
- OTs-38 Stechkin silent revolver
- OTs-12 Tiss assault rifle
- OTs-14 Groza assault rifle
- OTs-28 23mm shotgun (ru:ОЦ-28)
- ASh-12.7 12.7 mm battle rifle
- OSV-96 12.7 mm sniper rifle
- 12.7mm NSV machine gun and Afanasev A-12.7 machine gun
- 40mm GP-25/GP-30/GP-34 and RG-6 grenade launchers
- AGS-40 Balkan 40 mm automatic grenade launcher
- Afanasev Makarov AM-23 aircraft cannon
- "Rys" ("Lynx") series of shotguns
- RSh-12 and RSh-9 assault revolvers
