= AO-46 =

AO-46 may refer to:

- USS Victoria (AO-46)
- AO-46 compact assault rifle
