= AM-23 =

AM-23 may refer to:

- Afanasev Makarov AM-23, a Soviet aircraft gun
- USS Teal (AM-23), a U.S. Navy minesweeper
