= MTs 8 =

Soviet shotgun

- Type: double barreled shotgun
- Place of origin: USSR

Production history
- Designed: 1953
- Manufacturer: TsKIB SOO

Specifications
- Mass: 3.4 - 3.75 kg
- Barrel length: 675mm or 750mm
- Caliber: 12, 20 gauge
- Action: Break action
- Rate of fire: variable
- Sights: iron sights

The MTs 8 (МЦ 8) is a Soviet double-barreled high-quality custom skeet shotgun.

== History ==
MTs 8 was designed in 1953 and produced by TsKIB SOO.

These shotguns were used by Soviet teams in shooting competitions (incl. ISSF World Shooting Championships and Olympic Games).

In October 1962, at the 38th World Shooting Championships in Cairo, Soviet shooter N. D. Durnev, armed with MTs 8 shotgun, set an absolute world record, hitting 200 of 200 targets.

In 1970, at the 40th World Shooting Championships in Phoenix, Soviet shooter Yu. V. Sidorova, armed with MTs 8 shotgun, became the winner.

In September 1981, the price of one standard MTs 8 shotgun (without second pair of barrels) was about 700 roubles.

== Design ==
MTs 8 is an over and under hammerless smoothbore 12 gauge shotgun, with one barrel above the other.

It is equipped with safety mechanism and ejector.

All guns have a walnut shoulder stock (with or without cheekpiece) and fore-end, some of them were decorated with engravings.

== Variants ==
- MTs 8-0 (МЦ 8-0) - test prototype
- MTs 8-1 (МЦ 8-1) - first model, a skeet shotgun with 750mm barrels
- MTs 8-2 (МЦ 8-2) - second model, with different trigger mechanism
- MTs 8-3 (МЦ 8-3) - third model, MTs 8-1 with second pair of 675mm barrels
- MTs 8-4 (МЦ 8-4) - MTs 8-2 with second pair of 675mm barrels

At least several MTs 8 shotguns were equipped with third pair of barrels (20/70mm R).

== Museum exhibits ==
- MTs 8 shotgun is in collection of Tula State Arms Museum in Tula Kremlin

== Sources ==
- Спортивное двуствольное ружьё МЦ 8 // Охотничье, спортивное огнестрельное оружие. Каталог. М., 1958. стр.53-54
- Спортивное двуствольное ружьё МЦ 8-2 // Спортивно-охотничье оружие и патроны. Бухарест, "Внешторгиздат", 1965. стр.78
- Ружьё МЦ 8 // Охотничье огнестрельное оружие отечественного производства. Справочное методическое пособие для экспертов-криминалистов, следователей и оперативных работников органов МВД / под ред. А. И. Устинова. М., 1969. стр.213
- М. М. Блюм, И. Б. Шишкин. Охотничье ружьё. М., «Лесная промышленность», 1983. стр.90-91
- Ружьё двуствольное МЦ 8 // Охотничье и спортивное оружие. М., Внешторгиздат. 1989.
