= LAD machine gun =

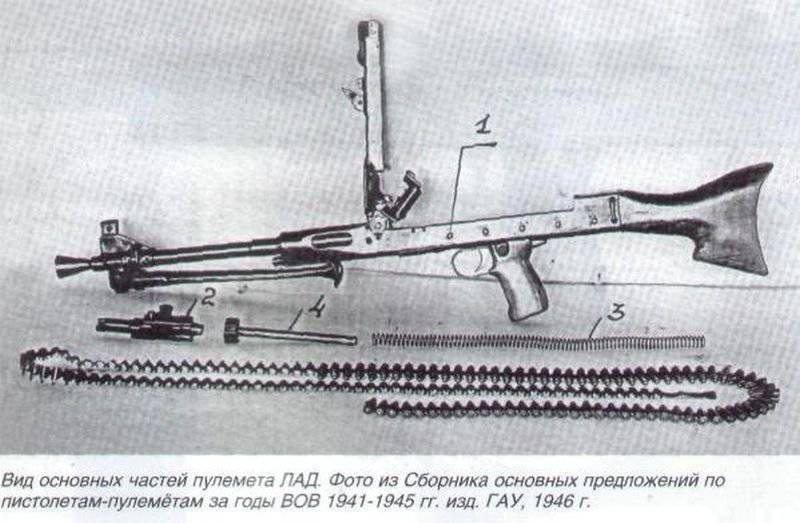
- Type: Belt-Fed Sub-Machine Gun
- Place of origin: Soviet Union

Production history
- Designer: Vasily Fedorovich Lyuty; Nikolay Mikhaylovich Afanasyev; Vladimir Sergeyevich Deykin
- Designed: 1942
- Manufacturer: Central Research Complex for Small Arms and Mortars (NIPSMVO)
- Produced: 1942-1943
- No. built: 2

Specifications
- Mass: 5.56kg
- Length: 970mm
- Cartridge: 7.62×25mm Tokarev
- Caliber: 7.62x25mm Tokarev
- Action: Blowback
- Rate of fire: 600 rpm
- Feed system: belt

The LAD machine gun (Russian: пулемет ЛАД) is a Soviet prototype light machine gun. Although belt-fed and having a built-in bipod, it is chambered for the Tokarev pistol cartridge. The LAD machine gun was developed between 1942 and 1943 by V. F. Lyuty, N. M. Afanasyev and V. S. Deykin. Only two prototypes were built and it was not accepted for service.

The two prototypes are on display at the Military Historical Museum of Artillery, Engineers and Signal Corps in Saint Petersburg.
