= Nikolai Afanasyev =

Russian weapons designer

Nikolay Afanasyev
- Николай Афанасьев
- Born: Nikolay Mikhailovich Afanasyev; 14 November 1916; St. Petersburg, Russian Empire
- Died: 15 March 2009 (aged 92)
- Occupation: Weapons designer

Nikolay Mikhailovich Afanasyev (Russian: Николай Михайлович Афанасьев; 14 November 1916 – 15 March 2009), also known as Nicolai Michaelovich Afanasiev, was a Russian firearms designer.

== Biography ==
Nicolai Michaelovitch Afanasiev was born in Russia on 14 November 1916 in St. Petersburg. In 1938 he graduated from a Tekhnikum of the Mechanization of Agriculture.

In 1939 he was drafted to serve in a tank corps in Mongolia, where he started to work on machine gun design. After the Nazi invasion of the Soviet Union, he volunteered for front-line service. He was allowed to be a fighter from September 1941 until the fall of 1942, when he was recalled to work on armaments, initially on improving fuses for 82- and 120-mm mortars.

After 1948 Afanasiev worked at the KBP Instrument Design Bureau.

He died on 15 March 2009.

== Designs ==
- LAD machine gun – 1942
- Afanasev A-12.7 – 1950
- Afanasev Makarov AM-23 – 1953
- a bullpup design with which he participated in the AKM contest - 1955
- 2A-14 23 mm autocannon, used in the ZU-23 – 1960 (with P.G. Yakushev)
- 2A-7 23 mm autocannon, used in the ZSU-23-4 – 1960 (with P.G. Yakushev)
- TKB-011
- TKB-0136, competed in Project Abakan
- OTs-02 Kiparis

== Honours and awards ==
- Hero of Socialist Labour (1986) – For achievements in the design of aircraft gun armament
- Two Orders of Lenin (1963, 1986)
- Order of the October Revolution (1977)
- Order of the Patriotic War, 2nd class (1963)
- USSR State Prize (1967)
- Mosin Prize
- Honoured Inventor of the RSFSR (1968)
