= MTs 6 =

Soviet shotgun

- Type: double barreled shotgun
- Place of origin: USSR

Production history
- Designed: 1948
- Manufacturer: TsKIB SOO; Tula Arms Plant

Specifications
- Mass: 3.0 - 3.6 kg
- Barrel length: 675mm or 750mm
- Cartridge: .12/70
- Caliber: 12 gauge
- Action: Break action
- Rate of fire: variable
- Sights: iron sights

The MTs 6 (МЦ 6) is a Soviet double-barreled high-quality custom hunting and skeet shotgun.

== History ==
MTs 6 was designed in 1948 by TsKIB SOO and produced by TsKIB SOO and Tulsky Oruzheiny Zavod.

These shotguns were used by Soviet teams in shooting competitions (incl. Olympic Games).

After the model MTs 106 was developed, the production of MTs 6 was discontinued.

== Design ==
MTs 6 is an over and under hammerless smoothbore 12 gauge shotgun, with one barrel above the other.

It is equipped with safety mechanism and ejector.

All guns have a walnut shoulder stock (with or without cheekpiece) and fore-end, some of them were decorated with engravings.

== Variants ==
- MTs 6-0 (МЦ 6-0), MTs 6-00 (МЦ 6-00) and MTs 6-03 (МЦ 6-03) - 12 gauge skeet shotguns, 3.4 - 3.6 kg
- MTs 6-12 (МЦ 6-12) - 12 gauge hunting shotgun with 750mm barrels and two triggers, 3.25 - 3.5 kg
- MTs 6-16 (МЦ 6-16) - 16 gauge hunting shotgun with 750mm barrels and two triggers, 3.0 - 3.25 kg
- MTs 6-20 (МЦ 6-20) - 20 gauge hunting shotgun with 750mm barrels and two triggers, 2.75 - 3.0 kg
- MTs 106 (МЦ 106) - next model

== Sources ==
- Основы спортивной охоты (охотминимум) / колл. авт., ред. И. Д. Гулевич. М., Воениздат, 1957. стр.121-122
- Охотничье двуствольное ружьё МЦ 6 // Охотничье, спортивное огнестрельное оружие. Каталог. М., 1958. стр.24-25
- Охотничье двуствольное ружьё МЦ 6 // Спортивно-охотничье оружие и патроны. Бухарест, "Внешторгиздат", 1965. стр.34-37
- Ружьё МЦ 6 // Охотничье огнестрельное оружие отечественного производства. Справочное методическое пособие для экспертов-криминалистов, следователей и оперативных работников органов МВД / под ред. А. И. Устинова. М., 1969. стр.212
- Отечественное охотничье оружие. Ружьё МЦ 6 // журнал «Охота и охотничье хозяйство», № 7, июль 1981. стр.29
- Виктор Гуров. Бокфлинты тульских оружейников // журнал "Охота", № 10 (170), 2012. стр.44-50
- Виктор Рон. Великолепная "шестёрка" // журнал "Оружие", № 6, 2012. стр.63-64 - ISSN 1728-9203
