= MTs 5 =

Soviet shotgun

- Type: double barreled shotgun
- Place of origin: USSR

Production history
- Manufacturer: TsKIB SOO
- Produced: 1950 - 1982

Specifications
- Mass: 2.2 - 3.4 kg (without optical sight)
- Barrel length: 600mm or 675mm
- Cartridge: 16/70, 20/70, 28/70, 32/70
- Caliber: 16, 20, 28, 32 gauge
- Action: Break action
- Rate of fire: variable
- Sights: iron sights optical sight

The MTs 5 (МЦ 5) is a family of Soviet double-barreled high-quality custom hunting shotguns, combination guns and rifles.

== History ==
MTs 5 was designed and produced by TsKIB SOO since 1950. It was shown at VDNKh exhibition in Moscow.

In November 1965, the price of one new MTs 5 was between 350 and 400 roubles. According to the official statement of TsKIB SOO specialists, it was the most durable and reliable civilian hunting weapon ever made in the USSR (by this time several MTs 5 guns had already withstood from 100,000 to 150,000 shots without breaking).

In June 1981, the price of one new MTs 5 was between 250 and 600 roubles.

After the model MTs 105 was developed, the production of MTs 5 was discontinued.

== Design ==
MTs 5 is an over and under hammerless gun, with one barrel above the other.

All guns have a walnut shoulder stock (with or without cheekpiece) and fore-end, some of them were decorated with engravings.

MTs 5 hunting rifles and combination guns can be equipped with detachable optical sight. The first MTs 5 guns were equipped with 3.5× optical sight P.O.T. (П.О.Т.), later they were equipped with 4× optical sight TO-4 and other optical sights.

MTs 5 was the first Soviet serial firearm equipped with optical sight that was sold as civilian hunting weapon.

== Variants ==
The MTs 5 was produced in twenty nine different versions.

- MTs 5 (МЦ 5) - a smoothbore double-barreled hunting shotgun with 750mm barrels, 3.0 - 3.2 kg
- MTs 5-01 (МЦ 5-01) - а hunting double-barreled rifle with 600mm barrels (.22 LR and 6.5mm rifle cartridge), 3.2 - 3.4 kg.; it was equipped with 3.5× optical sight P.O.T.
- MTs 5-02 (МЦ 5-02) - а hunting rifle with 600mm barrels (.22 LR and 7.62×54mmR), 3.2 - 3.4 kg.; it was equipped with 4× optical sight TO-4
- MTs 5-09 (МЦ 5-09) - а hunting rifle with 600mm barrels (.22 LR and 9×53mmR barrels), 3.2 - 3.4 kg.
- MTs 5-12 (МЦ 5-12) - а combination gun with 675mm barrels (32 gauge smoothbore barrel and .22 LR rifled barrel), 2.25 - 2.5 kg.
- MTs 5-14 (МЦ 5-14) - а combination gun with 675mm barrels (28 gauge smoothbore barrel and .22 LR rifled barrel), 2.6 - 2.8 kg.
- MTs 5-15 (МЦ 5-15) - а combination gun with 675mm barrels (20 gauge smoothbore barrel and .22 LR rifled barrel), 2.8 - 3.0 kg.; it was equipped with 2× optical sight
- MTs 5-18 (МЦ 5-18) - а combination gun with 675mm barrels (16 gauge smoothbore barrel and .22 LR rifled barrel), 3.0 - 3.25 kg.
- MTs 5-20 (МЦ 5-20) - a 20/70 smoothbore double-barreled hunting shotgun with 675mm barrels, 2.6 - 2.8 kg
- MTs 5-24 (МЦ 5-24) - а combination gun with 600mm barrels (28 gauge smoothbore barrel and 9×53mmR rifled barrel), 3.0 - 3.2 kg.
- MTs 5-26 (МЦ 5-26) - а combination gun with 675mm barrels (20 gauge and 6.5mm rifle cartridge), 3.2 - 3.4 kg
- MTs 5-27 (МЦ 5-27) - а combination gun with 675mm barrels (20 gauge and 7.62×54mmR), 3.2 - 3.4 kg
- MTs 5-28 (МЦ 5-28) - a 28/70 smoothbore double-barreled hunting shotgun with 675mm barrels, 2.4 - 2.6 kg
- MTs 5-32 (МЦ 5-32) - a 32/70 smoothbore double-barreled hunting shotgun with 675mm barrels, 2.2 - 2.4 kg
- MTs 5-35 (МЦ 5-35) - а combination gun with 675mm barrels (20 gauge smoothbore barrel and 5.6×39mm rifled barrel), 3.0 - 3.2 kg.
- MTs 105 (МЦ 105) - next model

== Sources ==
- Охотничье двуствольное ружьё МЦ 5 // Охотничье, спортивное огнестрельное оружие. Каталог. М., 1958. стр.21-22
- Охотничье двуствольное ружьё МЦ 5 // Спортивно-охотничье оружие и патроны. Бухарест, "Внешторгиздат", 1965. стр.58-59
- Ружьё МЦ 5 // Охотничье огнестрельное оружие отечественного производства. Справочное методическое пособие для экспертов-криминалистов, следователей и оперативных работников органов МВД / под ред. А. И. Устинова. М., 1969. стр.210
- Виктор Рон. Пятёрочка // журнал "Оружие", № 3, 2012. стр.64 - ISSN 1728-9203
