= MTs 30 =

Soviet hunting rifle

- Type: drilling
- Place of origin: USSR

Production history
- Designed: 1958 - 1971
- Manufacturer: TsKIB SOO

Specifications
- Mass: 3.6 - 4.0 kg (without optical sight)
- Barrel length: 600mm - 675mm
- Caliber: 12 gauge 9×53mmR
- Action: Break action
- Rate of fire: variable
- Sights: iron sights optical sight

The MTs 30 (МЦ 30) is a family of Soviet high-quality custom hunting combination guns.

== History ==
The gun was designed by M. I. Skvortsov (М. И. Скворцов), A. P. Glinskiy (А. П. Глинский) and I. P. Korneychev (И. П. Корнейчев) in 1960s - 1970s.

The first information and the first photograph of the new experimental three-barrelled combination gun MTs 30 were published in October 1960. The MTs 30-13 was announced in August 1961.

After tests and trials, in 1979, the first MTs 30-09 shotgun was shown at VDNKh exhibition in Moscow. It was produced by TsKIB SOO in small numbers.

In January 1979, the price of one custom MTs 30-09 gun was up to 2,000 roubles.

== Design ==
MTs 30 is a hammerless combination gun, with one barrel under two other.

- MTs 30-01, MTs 30-02 and MTs 30-03 have rifled barrels with four grooves
- all 9mm rifled barrels have six grooves with 320 mm twist rate.

It is equipped with safety mechanism and ejector.

All guns have a walnut shoulder stock (with cheekpiece) and fore-end, some of them were decorated with engravings.

MTs 30 can be equipped with optical sight.

- The first test prototype was equipped with TO-6P (ТО-6П) optical sight, although next guns were equipped with PO-4×34 (ПО-4×34) or TO-6PM (ТО-6ПМ) sights.

== Variants ==
- MTs 30-01 (МЦ 30-01) - the first test prototype with two smoothbore 20/70mm barrels and one 5.6mm rifled barrel chambered for experimental cartridge. It was equipped with TO-6P optical sight
- MTs 30-02 (МЦ 30-02) - the second test prototype with two smoothbore 20/70mm barrels and one 6.5mm rifled barrel chambered for 6.5×38mmR round
- MTs 30-03 (МЦ 30-03) - test prototype with two smoothbore 20/70mm barrels and one 7.62mm rifled barrel chambered for 7.62×38mmR round
- MTs 30-09 (МЦ 30-09) - model with two smoothbore 12/70mm barrels and one 9×53mmR rifled barrel
- MTs 30-12 (МЦ 30-12) - model with two 9×53mmR rifled barrels and one smoothbore 12/70mm barrel
- MTs 30-13 (МЦ 30-13) - test prototype with two smoothbore 20/70mm barrels and one 7.62mm rifled barrel chambered for 7.62×38mmR round
- MTs 30-20 (МЦ 30-20) - test prototype with two smoothbore 20/70mm barrels and one 5.6mm rifled barrel chambered for .22LR round
- MTs 140 (МЦ 140) - next model with two 650mm smoothbore 12/70mm barrels and one 9×53mmR rifled barrel

== Users ==
- Soviet Union
- Belarus - MTs 30-12 is allowed as civilian hunting weapon
- Latvia - one MTs 30 is registered as civilian hunting weapon
- Russian Federation - was allowed as civilian hunting weapon. On December 13, 1996, president of the Russian Federation B. N. Yeltsin signed the federal law № 150, which entered into force on July 1, 1997. In accordance with this law, possession of civilian firearms chambered for handgun ammunition was prohibited. As a result, since July 1, 1997, all MTs-30 guns chambered for handgun ammunition were banned on the territory of the Russian Federation and they had to be handed over to governmental law enforcement agencies for destruction.

== Sources ==
- Охотничье трехствольное ружьё МЦ 30 // Охотничье, спортивное огнестрельное оружие. Каталог. М., 1958. стр.30-31
- Охотничье трехствольное ружьё МЦ 30-20 // Спортивно-охотничье оружие и патроны. Бухарест, "Внешторгиздат", 1965. стр.62
- Ружьё МЦ 30 // Охотничье огнестрельное оружие отечественного производства. Справочное методическое пособие для экспертов-криминалистов, следователей и оперативных работников органов МВД / под ред. А. И. Устинова. М., 1969. стр.214
- МЦ-30 // История Тульского оружейного завода, 1712 - 1972. М., "Мысль", 1973. стр.479
- МЦ-30-09 // журнал «Охота и охотничье хозяйство», № 6, 1982. стр.31
- М. М. Блюм, И. Б. Шишкин. Охотничье ружьё. М., «Лесная промышленность», 1983. стр.93-94
- Kulobrokový troják MC-30-20 // «Střelecká revue», 3, 1975
