= MTs255 =

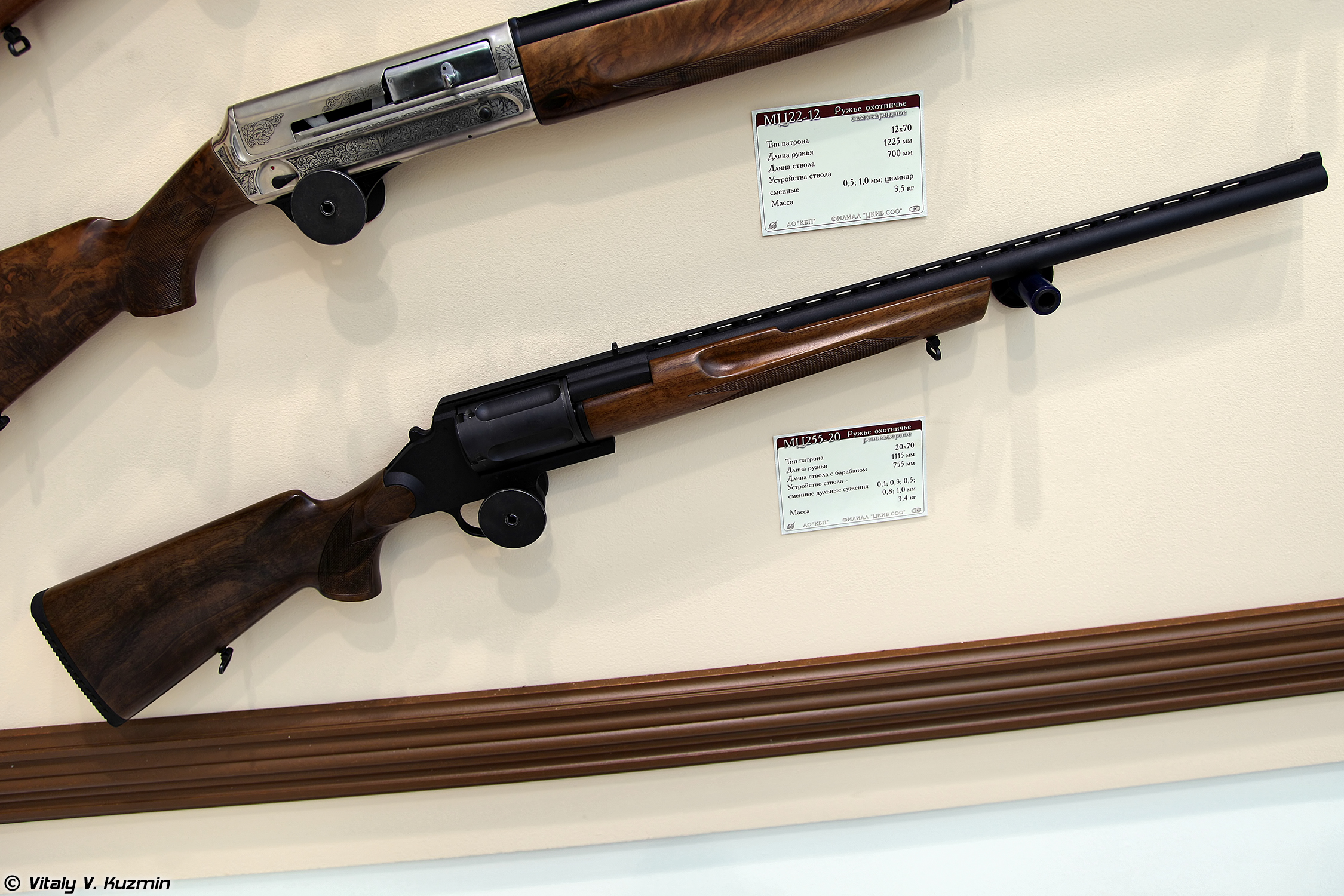
- Side view of MTs255
- Type: Shotgun
- Place of origin: Russia

Service history
- In service: 1993–present

Production history
- Designer: TsKIB SOO
- Designed: 1993
- Manufacturer: TsKIB-SOO

Specifications
- Mass: 3.7 kg (12)/ 3.4 kg (20)/ 3.3 kg (28)/ 3.1 kg (32, .410)
- Length: 1115 mm (12)/ 1065 mm (20, 28, 32, .410)
- Barrel length: 755 mm (12)/ 705 mm (20, 28, 32, .410)
- Cartridge: 12, 20, 28, 32 gauge, and .410 bore
- Action: Double-action
- Feed system: 5 rounds
- Sights: Iron sights

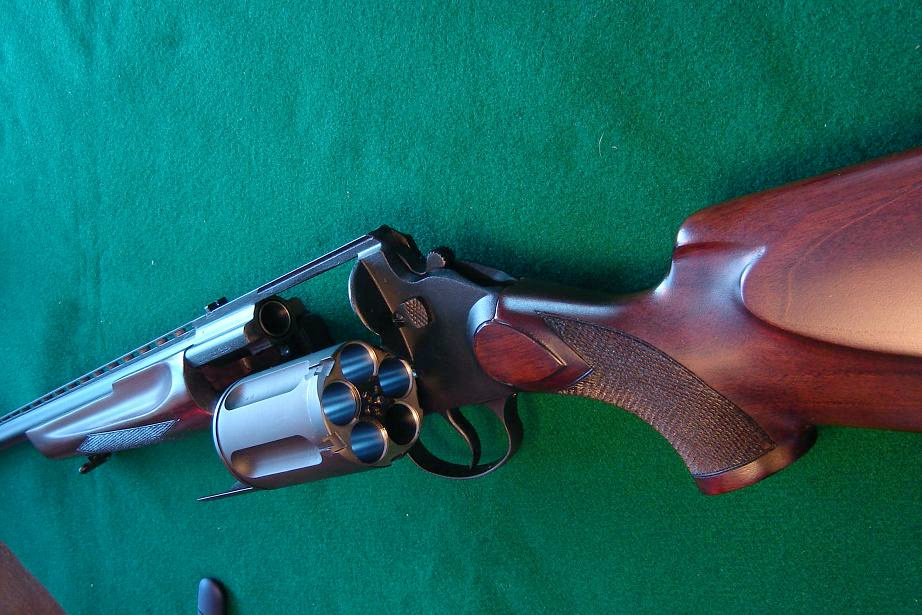
With action open

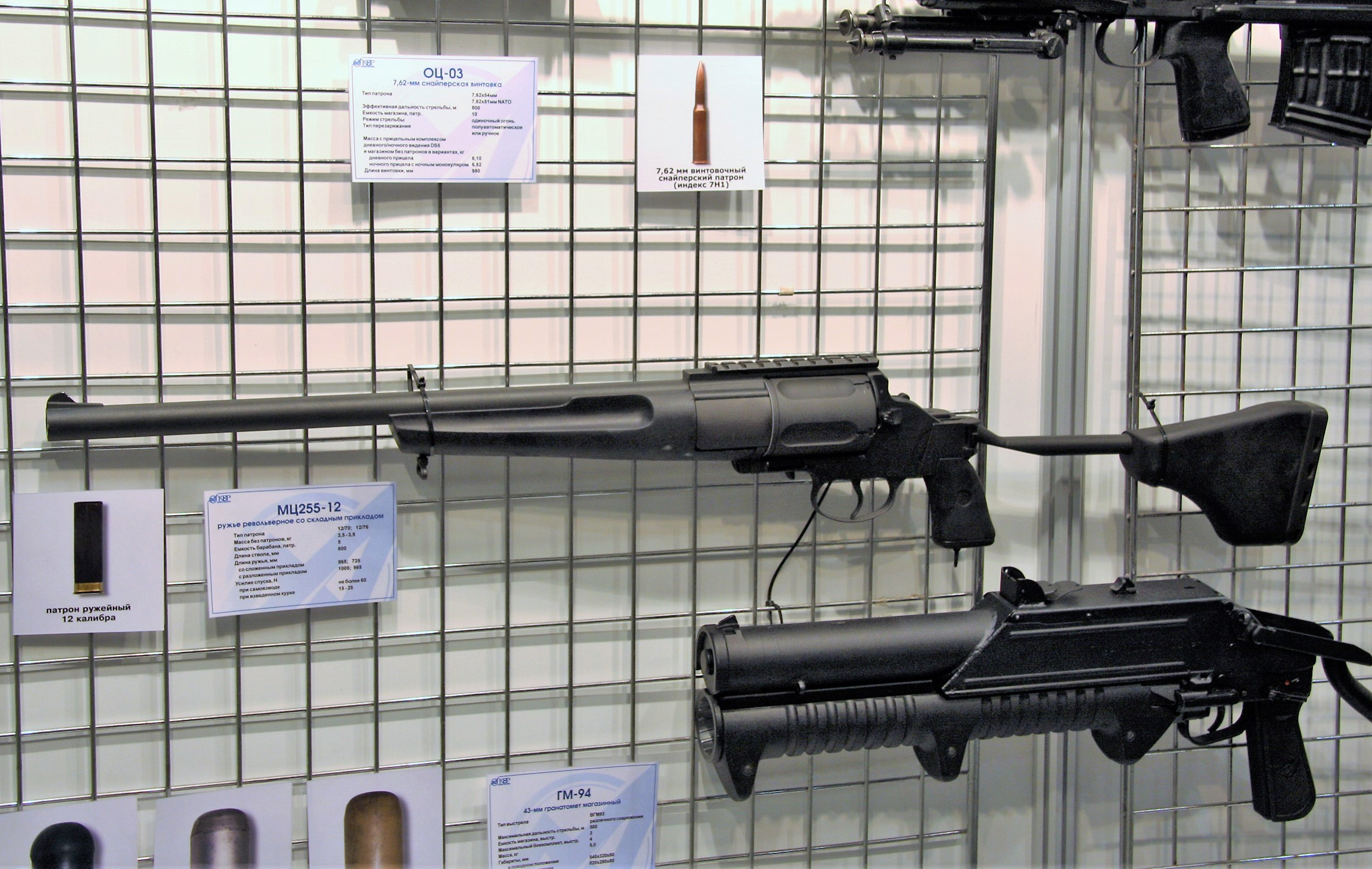
MTs255-12 - The police version

The MTs255 (Russian: МЦ255) is a Russian revolver shotgun fed by a 5-round swing-out cylinder. It is produced by the TsKIB SOO.

The MTs255 is unique in having a forearm extending nearly all the way back to the cylinder. The shotgun is reloaded in a manner consistent with that of most modern revolvers, by unlocking the cylinder and swinging it away from the frame to the left and down.

== Variants ==
- MTs255 (МЦ255) - civilian version, has a permanent wooden butt and fore-end. The guns are available in 12, 20, 28, and 32 gauge, and .410 bore. At present, it is not commercially available, only parts are available on request.
- MTs255-12 (МЦ255-12) - police version (for ammunition 12/70 and 12/76), designed for law enforcement and security agencies, is distinguished by accessories made of black plastic, folding stock and a "Picatinny rail" bar for attaching sighting devices.

== Users ==
- Belarus - is allowed as civilian hunting weapon
- Russian Federation - is allowed as civilian hunting weapon

== See also ==
- Colt Revolving Rifle
- List of Russian weaponry

== Sources ==
- Виктор Зеленко, Вячеслав Трухачев. Ружьё МЦ 255 // журнал «Оружие», № 3, 2005. стр.56-58
- MC 255 // «Střelecká revue», 12, 2007
