= TKB-022PM =

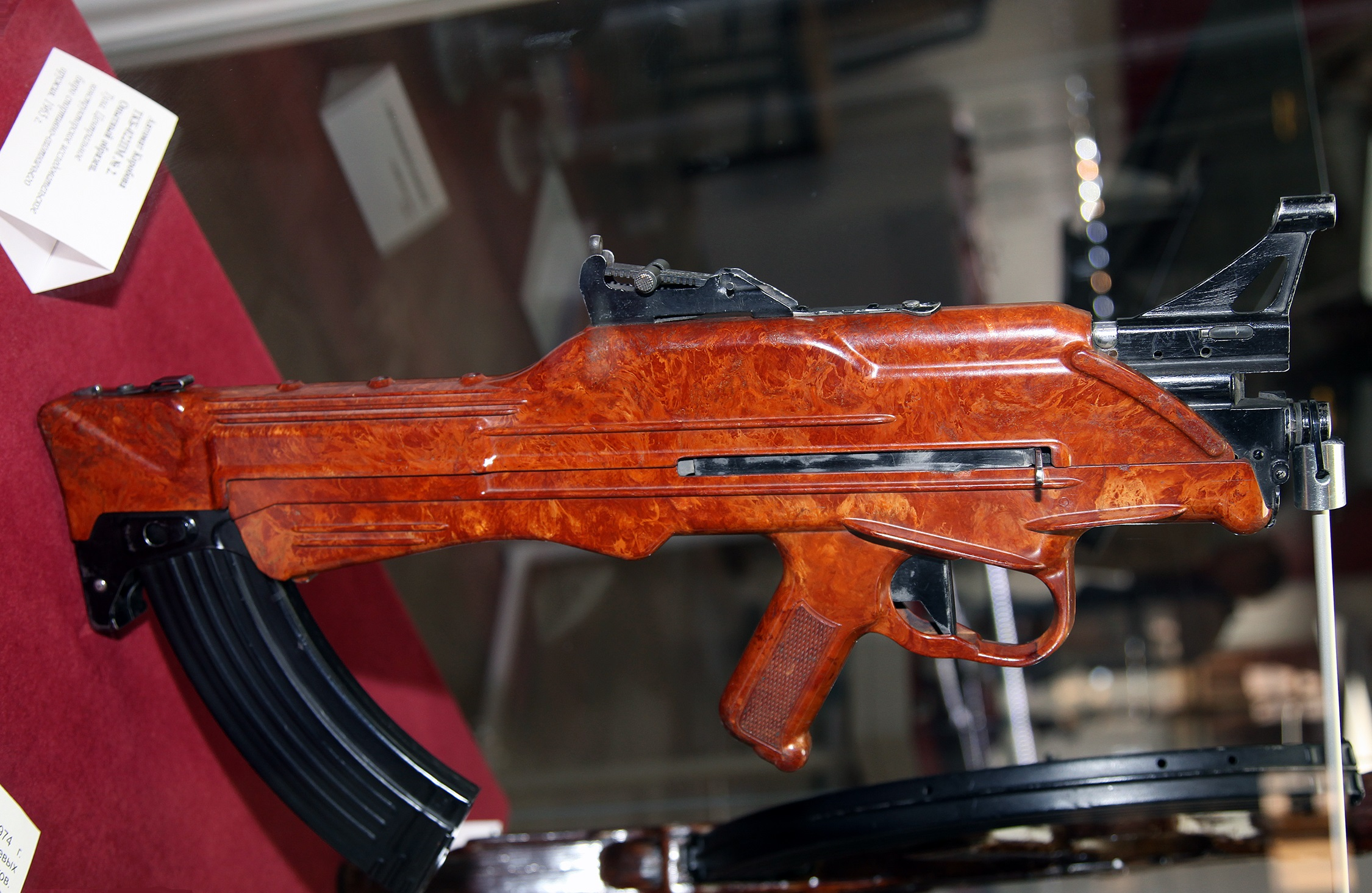
- A ТКБ-022ПМ displayed at Tula Arms Museum
- Type: Bullpup assault rifle
- Place of origin: Soviet Union

Production history
- Designer: German A. Korobov
- Designed: 1955
- Manufacturer: TsKIB SOO
- Produced: 1962 (TKB-022P and TKB-022PM No. 1); 1965 (TKB-022PM No. 2); 1968 (TKB-022PM5 No. 1)
- Variants: TKB-022PM No. 2; TKB-022PM5 No. 1

Specifications
- Mass: TKB-022PM No. 1: 2.8 kg (6.2 lb); TKB-022PM No. 2: 2.34 kg (5.2 lb)
- Length: 525 mm (20.7 in)
- Barrel length: 415 mm (16.3 in)
- Cartridge: 7.62×39mm; 5.6×39mm
- Rate of fire: 560 rounds/min
- Feed system: 30-round detachable AKM magazine
- Sights: Adjustable iron sights

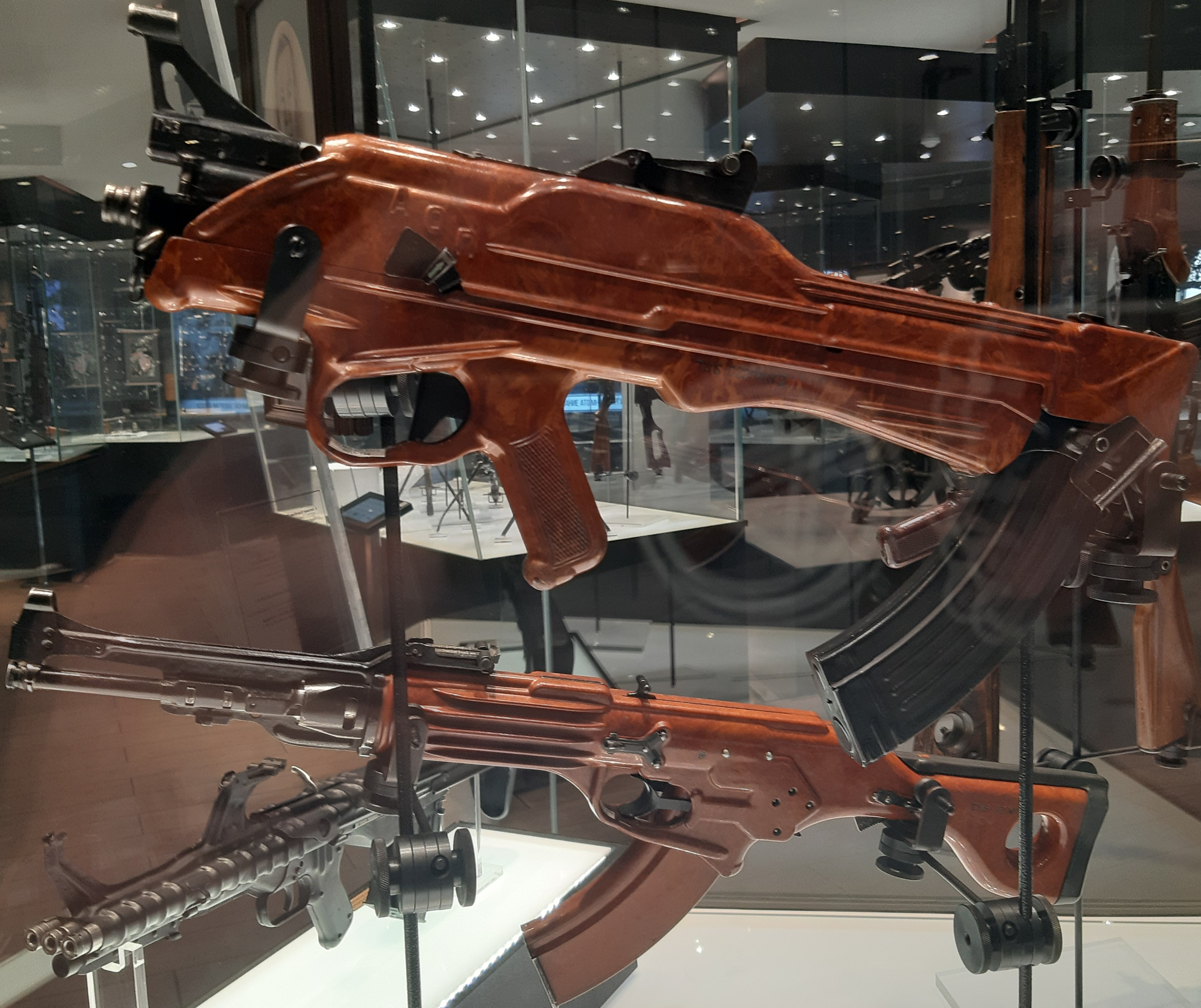
A photo of the TKB-022PM above the TKB-022P

The TKB-022PM (Russian: ТКБ-022ПМ) and its variants were prototype Soviet bullpup assault rifles, capable of fully automatic fire, chambered for the 7.62×39mm round (TKB-022PM No. 1 and TKB-022PM No. 2) and the 5.6×39mm round (TKB-022PM5 No. 1), developed at TsKIB SOO by the small arms designer German A. Korobov in the 1960s. Preceding these rifles was the TKB-022P, a rifle rejected for poor ergonomics.

The weapons were gas-operated with an annular gas piston located around the barrel and a vertically moving bolt, which made it possible to minimize the length of the receiver group. A U-shaped feeder/extractor was used to chamber and extract the cartridge by pushing it into the chamber, then, after discharge, was pulled back from the chamber. Upon feeding the new cartridge, it would then be pushed forward and slightly up into an ejection tube running above the barrel, from which it would finally exit above the muzzle. This ejection mechanism made it possible to fire the weapon both right- and left-handed.

As part of a Soviet-backed research and development program for replacing the AKM, the weapons were designed to be lightweight and compact; these goals were achieved by using fiber-reinforced polymers and a unique mechanism, respectively. Firing from an unstable position, the TKB-022PM No. 1 had three times better accuracy than the AKM, and the TKB-022PM5 had better accuracy than the AKM when fired from a lying position at a distance of 100 meters.

Despite having some advantages over the AKM, they were turned down by the conservatively minded Soviet Army due to their complex internals. Additionally, there were concerns about the displaced center of gravity to the tail end of the weapon and the durability of the weapon's plastic housing during prolonged operations under difficult conditions or during storage.

== Development ==
Originally, German A. Korobov had abandoned the bullpup concept after the rejection of the TKB-408, a rifle that competed with the AK-47 among others in the 1940's. Using the experience gained from his prior development of the TKB-408, Korobov returned to the bullpup concept for the TKB-022 series of rifles, developed at TsKIB SOO as part of a research and development program backed by the Soviet Army for a potential new rifle that could replace the recently adopted AKM (adopted in 1959), as a better and cheaper weapon. Several models were designed between 1960 and 1962. In 1962, Korobov created the TKB-022P rifle, which was chambered for 7.62x39mm and built primarily with a fibre-reinforced polymer known as AG-4, a new material at the time. While the accuracy was equivalent to the AKM, this rifle was rejected due to the large and curved AKM magazine functioning poorly as the weapon's pistol grip.

After the rejection of the TKB-022P, Korobov next sought to design a rifle with as little length and weight as possible, resulting in the TKB-022PM and its revisions. Prototypes were submitted, and while the TKB-022PM No. 1 had three times greater accuracy than the AKM whilst firing fully automatically from an unstable position, and the TKB-022PM5 had better accuracy at a range of 100 meters from a lying position, the rifles were all rejected by the Soviet military for multiple reasons. The primary issue was the complexity of the weapons' internals, which involved many small parts that were deemed unsuitable for mass production and extensive field use. Other issues included the weapons' poor center of gravity, with most of the mass being allocated to the rear, as well as doubts surrounding the durability of their plastic housing in storage and harsh environmental conditions. Malfunctions that occurred during firing usually required total disassembly of the weapon. The physical appearances of these rifles were considered "an eyesore". The conservative nature of senior military officials also affected the weapon's success, particularly if the improvement in combat performance wasn't obvious. The weapon's place of manufacture being Tula rather than Izhevsk further impacted opinions of officials.

The rifles are currently stored across various places, including the KBP, TsKIB SOO and Tula State Arms Museum.

== Design ==
The TKB-022PM rifles were gas-operated, select-fire assault rifles with single-action triggers. The gas piston is placed above both the barrel and ejection tube, with the gas cylinder connected to the barrel using a gas block to the left of the mechanism. A switch on the left side of the gun allows the user to select been safe, semi and fully automatic fire, and the iron sights are adjustable, although the sight line's length is relatively short. A manually operated valve allowed for shutting off the gas vent, for firing rifle grenades from a muzzle attachment.

The weapon's bolt also functions as a breechblock to help achieve a shorter length. Rather than moving in the common horizontal motion of traditional bolts, it moves vertically instead. An action rod, which slides horizontally, has attached to it a set of dual rollers, which move rocking levers that operate the bolt. Due to its vertical movement rendering it unable to extract, eject and load cartridges, a unique and complicated U-shaped feeder and extractor was designed. As the extractor moves backward, the spent casing is elevated upwards within the extractor, then moved into the ejection chute once it advances forward, eventually to be ejected out the front of the gun. A spring-loaded hatch covers this chute's opening. This ejection method allowed the firearm to be used ambidextrously, as well as reduce the effect of discharged gases on the shooter's mucous membrane.

Much like its predecessor, the TKB-022P, the weapons' housings were primarily created from fibre-reinforced polymer, manufactured as upper and lower halves rather than the TKB-022P's left and right halves. With an empty magazine, the entire weapon weighed 2.8 kilograms. In theory, the use of plastic would have also provided a lower manufacturing cost than the AKM, which costed around 42 Russian rubles per rifle in the 1960's.

The TKB-022PM was chambered for 7.62x39mm cartridges, and was designed to use AKM magazines situated as close to the back of the gun as possible, which would allow for the barrel to maintain a good length while keeping the firearm compact. This design resulted in a length of 525 millimetres, with 415 millimetres containing the barrel. Compared to the AKMS with its stock folded, it was 115 millimetres shorter with the same barrel length.

The TKB-022PM5 was the final prototype, being chambered for the 5.6x39mm round, which was new at the time. The TKB-022PM5 had otherwise identical design to the TKB-022PM.

== See also ==
- List of modern Russian small arms and light weapons
- List of bullpup firearms
- List of assault rifles
- TKB-011 2M
- TKB-0146
- FN F2000, a bullpup assault rifle with a similar concept to the TKB-022PM in its ejection mechanism
