= Afanasev A-12.7 =

A-12.7 aircraft machine gun
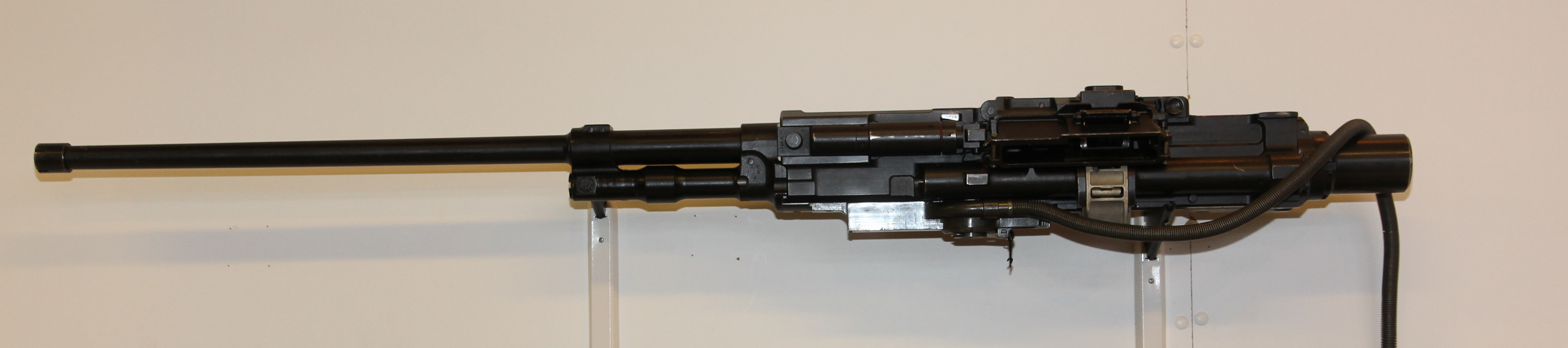
- Type: Single-barrel aircraft machine gun
- Place of origin: Soviet Union

Service history
- Used by: Soviet Union, Russia

Production history
- Designer: Nikolay M. Afanasev
- Designed: 1949–1953
- Manufacturer: Tulamashzavod Tula; Izhmash Izhevsk; Kovrov KMZ
- Produced: 1953–1983

Specifications
- Mass: 25.5 kg (56 lb)
- Length: 1,423 mm (4 ft 8 in)
- Barrel length: 1,005 mm (3 ft 4 in)
- Width: 154 mm (6 in)
- Height: 154.5 mm (6 in)
- Cartridge: 12.7×108mm
- Caliber: 12.7 mm (0.50 in)
- Barrels: 1
- Action: Gas operation
- Rate of fire: 800–1,100 rpm
- Muzzle velocity: 818 m/s (2,680 ft/s)

The Afanasev A-12.7 is a heavy machine gun developed by Nikolay M. Afanasev in 1949 and adopted for service in 1953. This gun was supposed to have a considerably higher rate of fire than its predecessor, the Berezin UB aircraft machine gun. Due to excessive barrel wear however, it was eventually limited by an electrical trigger to a rate comparable to the Berezin UB. Initially intended to be mounted in the defensive turrets of the Tu-4 bomber, the A-12.7 was ultimately installed only in trainer aircraft and helicopters. Nevertheless, it was produced for 30 years.

== History ==
After the Second World War various attempts were made to increase the rate of fire of the Berezin machine gun. Reducing the cycle time by increasing the speed of the moving parts was the most obvious thing to do. However, this resulted in a considerable reduction of life and reliability. Another attempt was to reduce the motion length of the moving parts while retaining their speed within permissible limits. N. M. Afanasev took a different approach by introducing an acceleration lever, which transferred the energy of a short motion actuating slide into a long motion of a chambering and case extraction arm. This way the motion length of the actuating slide could remain shorter than the overall length of the cartridge, thus increasing the rate of fire. Later, the same operating mechanism was used in the 23mm AM-23 and ZSU-23 cannon as well.

Afanasev's prototype 12.7mm machine gun was designated TKB-481 and reached an impressive rate of fire of 1,400 rounds per minute. However, because of barrel wear problems a special electrical trigger system was introduced, that artificially reduced the rate of fire to 800 - 1,100 rounds per minute. With this modification the barrel life increased to 4,000 rounds, however the gun no longer had any distinct advantages over the Berezin UB. Nevertheless, in the autumn of 1953, Afanasev's 12.7mm aircraft machine gun was adopted put into production under the designation A-12.7. The GRAU index of the weapon is 9-A-016P.

The A-12.7 machine gun is a gas-operated weapon with a vertically moving wedge breechblock. On the actuating slide two pivoting, jointed chambering levers are mounted. Those chambering levers actually work like the arms of a praying mantis. The upper, longer lever is used to ram the cartridge from the belt link into the chamber. An extraction claw on its forward end is used to extract the fired cartridge case. The lower lever protrudes into the weapon housing and has a U-shaped recess on its lower end. As the actuating slide moves back and forth, a traverse lug in the weapon housing is cammed into this recess to guide the chambering levers. The A-12.7 aircraft machine gun has an electrical sear mechanism that is operated by a voltage of 26V. At the back plate a spring buffer is located. Ammunition may be fed from either the left or from the right side. A pneumatically operated charging mechanism on the left side of the receiver is used to charge the machine gun and to clear misfires. The cylindrical housing on the right side of the receiver contains the return spring of the actuating slide.

The internal machining of the barrel of the A-12.7 was the same as that of the DShK heavy machine gun, with 8 grooves 0.17 mm deep and 2.8 mm wide.

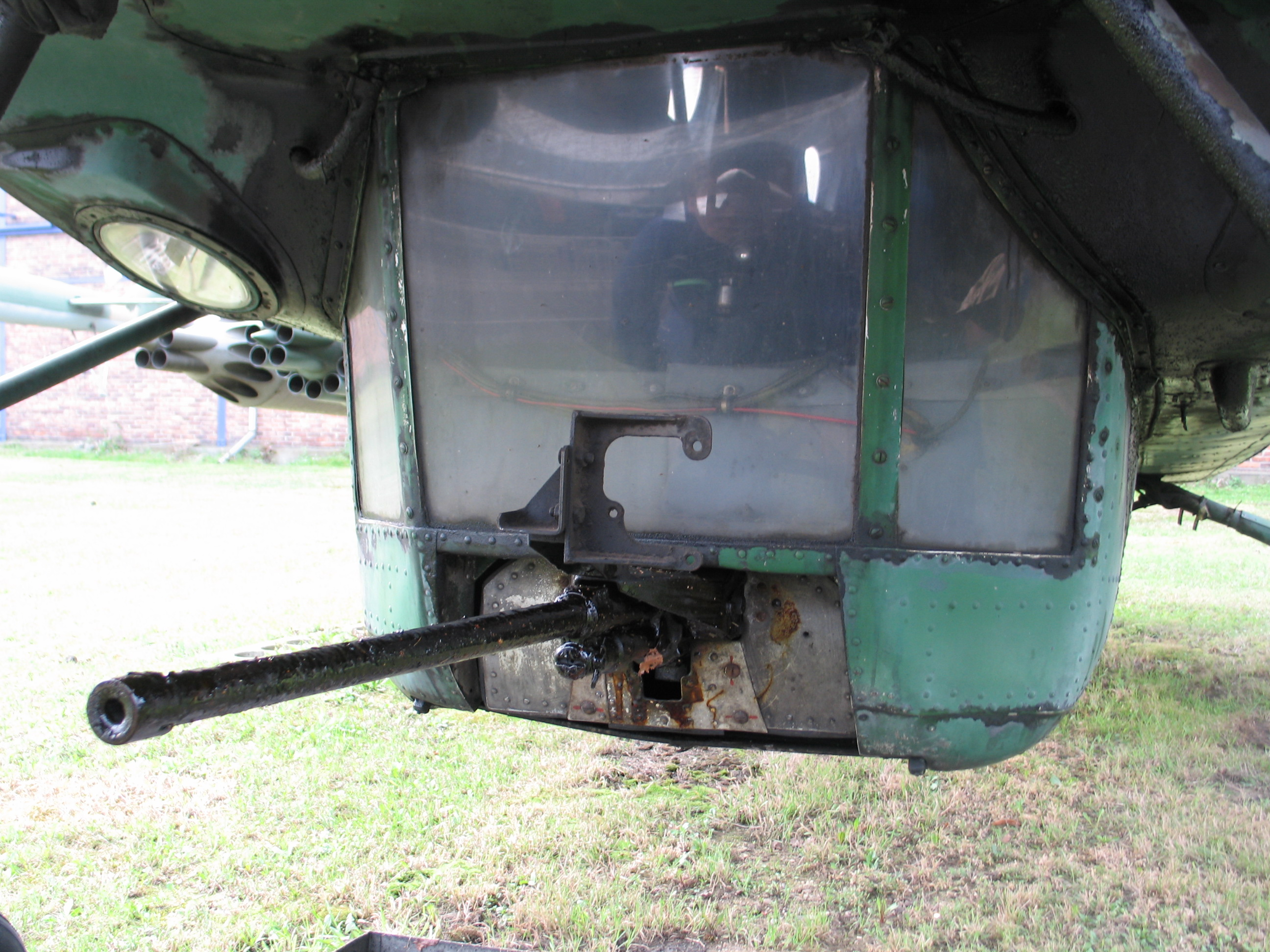
A-12.7 mounted on a Mi-4A helicopter

The A-12.7 machine gun never armed the Tu-4 bomber as initially intended. By then, machine guns were considered obsolescent for this purpose and 23mm cannon were employed instead. Therefore, the A-12.7 was only used in training aircraft and helicopters. The UTI trainer versions of the MiG-15, MiG-17 and MiG-19 aircraft carried a single A-12.7 machine gun. The main application of Afanasev's 12.7mm machine gun, however, was the armament of helicopters. The Mi-4A helicopter was equipped with a single gun with 200 rounds in the gondola below the fuselage. A single A-12.7 was also installed in the nose of the Mi-6A transport helicopter. The Mi-8TV had an A-12.7 machine gun in its nose as well and on the Mi-24A it was installed in the turret NUV-1.

An exemplar can be seen at the ru:Музей Войск ПВО and another at Aviation Museum of Central Finland.

== See also ==
- Afanasev Makarov AM-23
- Shipunov 2A42
