= TKB-408 =

- Computer generated image of a TKB-408
- Type: Bullpup assault rifle
- Place of origin: Soviet Union

Production history
- Designer: German A. Korobov
- Designed: 1946
- Produced: 1946

Specifications
- Mass: 4.37 kg (9.6 lb) with empty magazine
- Length: 790 mm (31.1 in)
- Barrel length: 335 mm (13.2 in)
- Cartridge: 7.62×39mm
- Action: Gas-operated, tilting bolt
- Rate of fire: 503 rounds/min
- Feed system: 30-round detachable AK magazine
- Sights: Iron sights

The TKB-408 (Russian: ТКБ-408) was a bullpup assault rifle prototype by Soviet small arms designer German A. Korobov presented in 1946. Designed for the 7.62x39mm cartridge, the TKB-408 was submitted to a set of official trials conducted in 1946 to select an assault rifle for the Red Army. Considered unusual for its bullpup layout, it had numerous problems in the trials and was taken out after 5,000 rounds of testing, with the trials eventually selecting Mikhail Kalashnikov's AK-47.

== Development ==
In December 1946, the Soviet Army had approved 5 different prototype assault rifles, among them being German A. Korobov's TKB-408. Korobov decided on a bullpup design as it was believed to be a bold decision, using an under-explored and unusual weapon type as one of the first serious prototypes submitted. However, the state of technology advancement and experience at the time did not allow the bullpup concept to be fully explored. While it is often cited as one of the first bullpups submitted for military trial, others have preceded this weapon, such as the Thorneycroft carbine in 1901.

After extensive testing of the models presented in the first round of trials, the TKB-408 was taken out of the competition after 5,000 rounds of firing as a result of several issues. It had poor durability in the bolt and receiver, numerous instances of jamming and failed to meet accuracy and weight requirements. The recoil spring would also deform from the heat generated by firing due to its placement near the barrel, negatively impacting the TKB-408's performance. Furthermore, the design of the gas-operated mechanism was considered too complex. The conservative nature of senior officials who conducted the trials also impacted its removal, as they preferred the familiarity of standard rifle layouts. Eventually, Kalashnikov's AK-47 would win the trials after numerous revisions, being put into mass production in 1949.

Korobov would later use the experience gained from working on the TKB-408 in creating a new bullpup assault rifle, the TKB-022PM.

== Design ==
The TKB-408 used a gas-operated system, much like the other rifles submitted in the competition. It utilised a locked breech action, and a tilting bolt that locked the barrel by meeting with its lower lug. The firing mechanism involved a striker with an independent main spring. Beneath the barrel was a tube containing the recoil spring that used the ramrod as a guide rod, and attached to the barrel was a muzzle brake. It had a fire selector on the left and above the trigger, and a separate safety lever inside the trigger guard. Its charging handle was also non-reciprocating, and the ejection port had a dust cover that flipped downwards.

The gun was designed using a bullpup configuration, placing the magazine behind the trigger assembly, and housing the firing mechanism within the stock. This configuration allowed the rifle's length to be reduced by about 200mm while keeping a standard barrel length, giving it an overall length of 790mm. This design had disadvantages however, as the placement of the ejection port did not allow left-handed shooting, and gases discharged from spent cartridges would irritate the mucous membrane of the shooter.

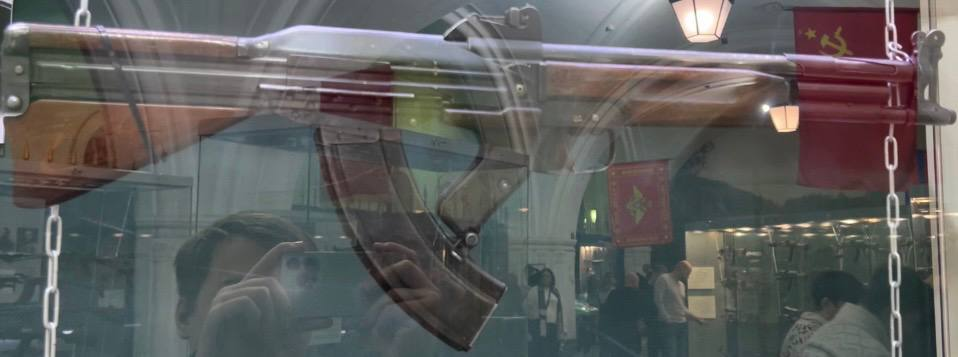
TKB-408 at the Tula Arms State Museum

The weapon is chambered in the Soviet 7.62×39mm M43 intermediate round. The 30-round magazines were made of sheet metal, being locked in place by a latch located on the pistol grip's rear. Stamped steel comprised most of the weapon's parts, alongside wood for the handguard and stock.

== See also ==
- AO-46
- TKB-517
- TKB-059
- TKB-0146
- Dlugov assault rifle
- List of bullpup firearms
