= TKB-011 =

TKB-011 2M
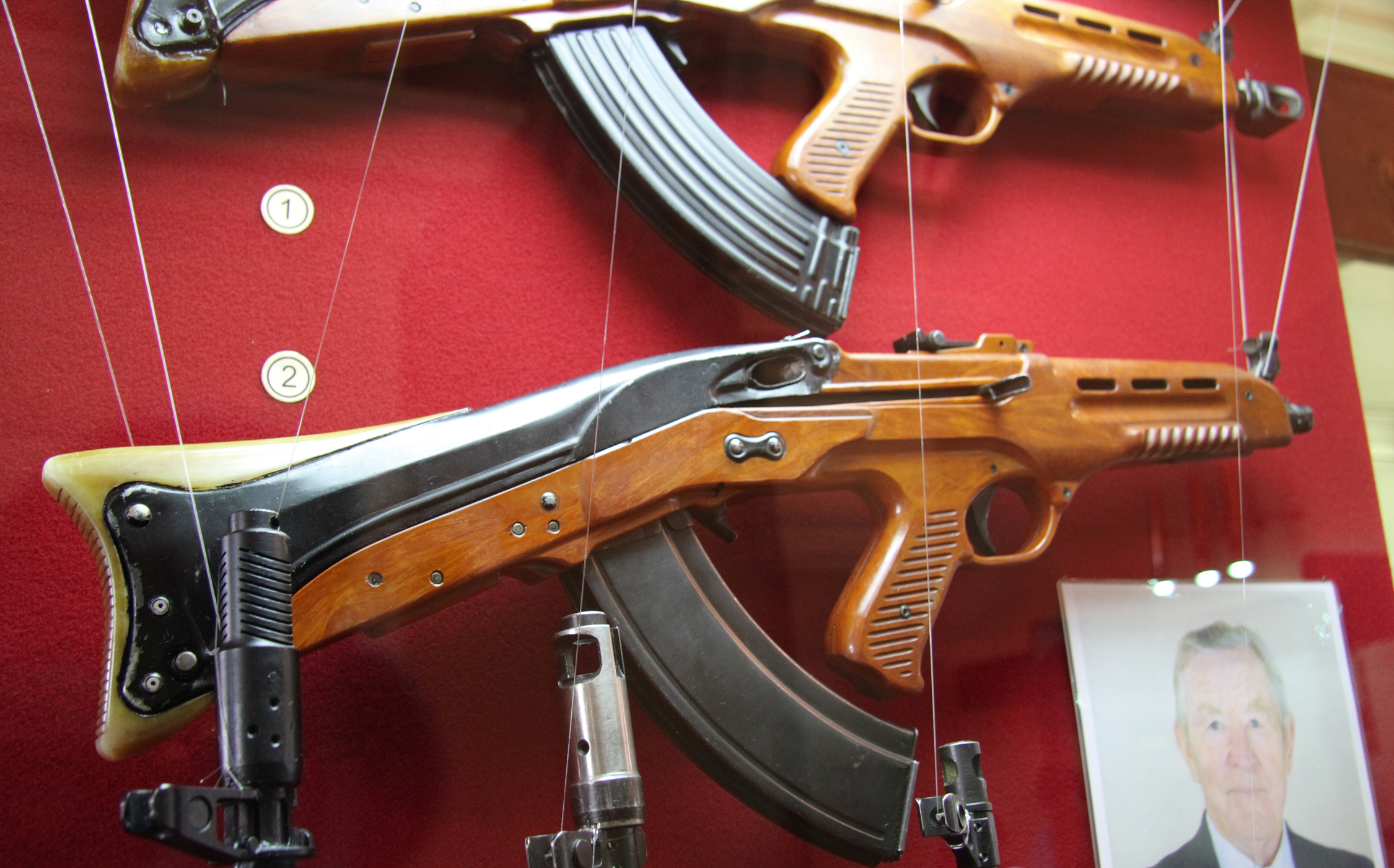
- TKB-011 rifle 1963 mod.
- Type: Bullpup assault rifle
- Place of origin: Soviet Union

Production history
- Designer: Nikolai M. Afanasyev
- Produced: 1963 (TKB-011); 1964 (TKB-011M); 1965 (TKB-011 2M)
- Variants: TKB-011; TKB-011M; TKB-011 2M

Specifications
- Cartridge: 7.62×39mm
- Caliber: 7.62mm
- Action: Roller-delayed blowback (TKB-011); Toggle-delayed blowback (TKB-011M); Gas-operated, tilting bolt (TKB-011 2M)
- Feed system: 30 and 50-round detachable box magazine
- Sights: Iron sights

TKB-011 (ТКБ-011), TKB-011M (ТКБ-011М) and TKB-011 2M (ТКБ-011 2М) were Soviet bullpup assault rifles, capable of fully automatic fire, chambered for the 7.62×39mm round, developed by the small arms designer Nikolai M. Afanasyev from 1963 to 1965.

The internals of the weapons were made of steel and the externals bakelite. These assault rifles and the TKB-022PM were the first to use a tunnel type ejection port, which is now used on the FN F2000.

== See also ==
- TKB-022PM
- TKB-0146
- List of modern Russian small arms and light weapons
- List of bullpup firearms
- List of assault rifles
