= AKMSU =

- Type: Assault rifle Carbine
- Place of origin: Pakistan (suspected)

Production history
- Designer: A gunsmith from Dara Adamkhel
- Designed: Early 1980s
- Manufacturer: Dara dam khel
- No. built: 1

Specifications
- Mass: 2.85 Kg
- Length: 480mm (folded) / 740mm (extended)
- Barrel length: 270mm
- Cartridge: 7.62×39mm
- Action: Gas operated, rotating bolt
- Rate of fire: 650-785 rounds/min
- Muzzle velocity: 680 m/s (2,231 ft/s)
- Effective firing range: 200 m
- Maximum firing range: 400 m
- Feed system: 30-round detachable box magazine

The AKMSU (Russian: АКМСУ) (Note: Attributed full name: Russian: Автомат Калашникова Mодернизированный Складной Укороченный, romanized: Avtomát Kaláshnikova Modernizírovanny Skladnoy Ukorochenniy, lit. 'Shortened Modernized Kalashnikov Automatic Rifle with Folding Stock') is the name attributed to a compact carbine derived from the Soviet AKM, chambered in 7.62×39mm. The carbine was commonly thought to be a Soviet prototype weapon, but evidence suggests that the carbine was not actually of Soviet origin, and was instead a custom-made weapon misattributed as a Soviet weapon.

== Origins ==
The carbine that would later be attributed with the name AKMSU was first received by the British Ministry of Defense Pattern Room collection in June 1986. The Pattern Room closed in September 2005, and their entire collection was gifted to the Royal Armouries in Leeds, England, where the AKMSU resides to this day.

Following the Pattern Room's reception of the carbine, the carbine would be documented in several English and Russian publications, and the name AKMSU was later attached to the weapon. Alongside the name, the weapon was also attributed with history that describe it as a Soviet prototype weapon, made in either 1959 or 1975. Despite the description of these sources, no Russian armory documentation exists for the weapon, strongly suggesting that AKMSU was not a Soviet weapon.

The true origin of the AKMSU is uncertain, though it has been suspected to be a one-off "Khyber Pass Copy" from Pakistan's Khyber Pass region, an area known for diverse and unique weapon production in small shops.

== Design ==
The AKMSU is composed of a Chinese manufactured Type 56-1 receiver combined with a 1977 dated AKM trunnion. Its other custom parts include a muzzle brake, which is required for the correct functioning of the rifle and contains an expansion chamber to correctly cycle the rifle. The muzzle brake has many grooves machined into it for increased heat dispersion. It also has a custom hand guard.
