= AO-46 (firearm) =

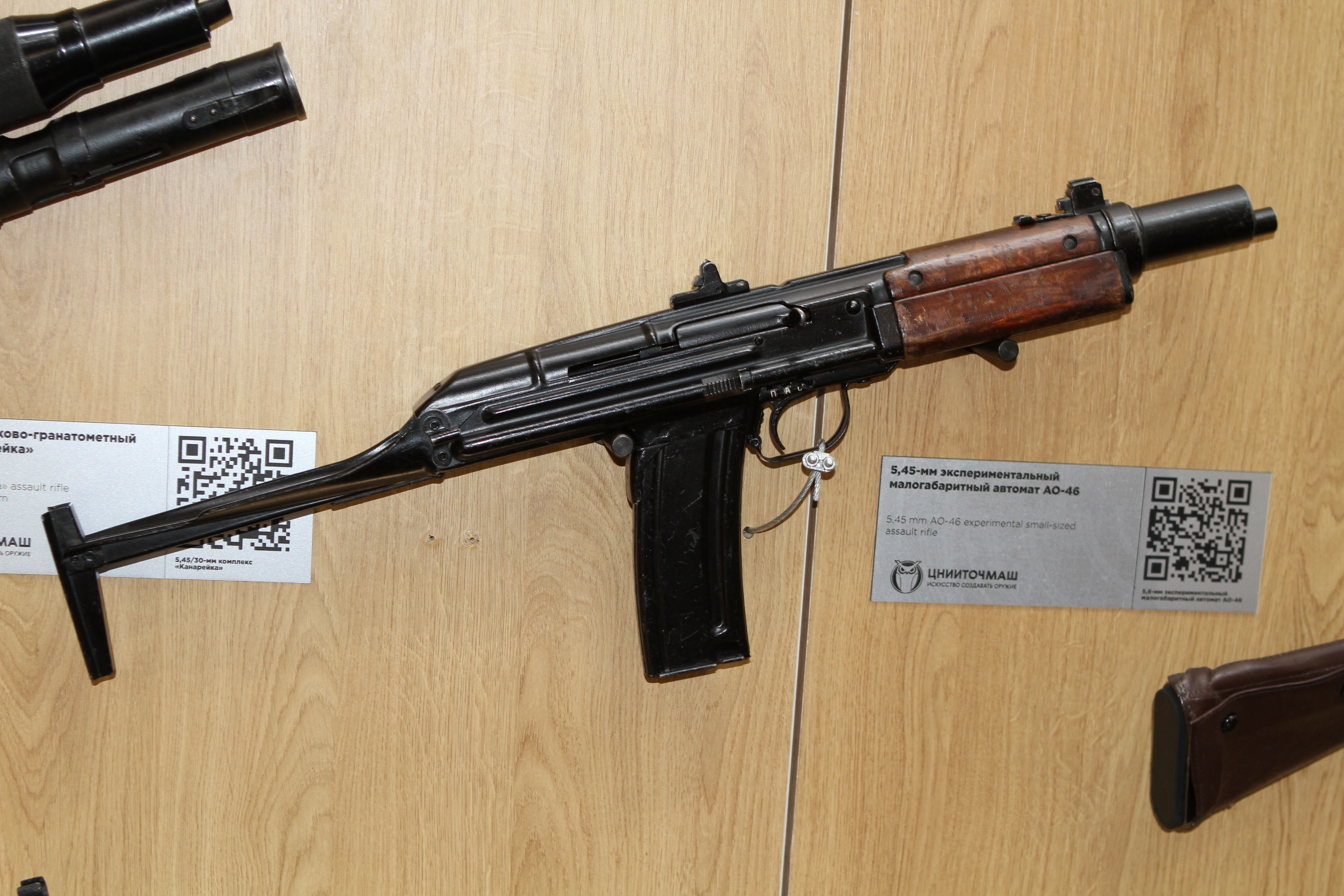
- An AO-46 model at the TsNIITochMash Museum in Klimovsk, Russia
- Type: Carbine/Assault Rifle; Personal defense weapon
- Place of origin: Soviet Union

Production history
- Designer: Peter Andreevich Tkachev
- Designed: 1969

Specifications
- Mass: 2.0 kg (4.4 lb)
- Length: 655 mm (25.7 in) stock extended / 458 mm (18.0 in) stock folded
- Barrel length: 245 mm (9.7 in)
- Cartridge: 5.45×39mm
- Caliber: 5.45 mm
- Action: Gas-operated, Select-fire
- Rate of fire: 700 rpm
- Muzzle velocity: 715 m/s
- Maximum firing range: 400 m
- Feed system: 15-round box magazine
- Sights: Iron sights

The AO-46 was a gas-operated 5.45×39mm caliber, compact carbine/assault rifle prototype. It features a folding stock and the trigger is located just in front of the magazine, which doubles as a pistol grip. In order to minimize the length of the gun, gas for automatic operation was collected not out of the barrel, but directly from the flash suppressor in the muzzle. Despite having the latter feature, the combination of a relatively powerful cartridge and short barrel produced a flash comparable to that of a sawed-off shotgun.

The weapon was an unsolicited design by Peter Andreevich Tkachev working at TsNIITochMash. Although not accepted for service, this design, in combination with report of the US use of the XM-177 in Vietnam led the GRAU to start the competition known as Project Modern, which led to the adoption of AKS-74U for service.

Although the Soviet doctrine did not have an equivalent concept, the AO-46 design corresponds to the Western concept of personal defense weapon (PDW).

== See also ==
- List of Russian weaponry
- Joint Venture Protective Carbine
- Heckler & Koch MP7
- TKB-408
- TKB-059
