= TKB-415 =

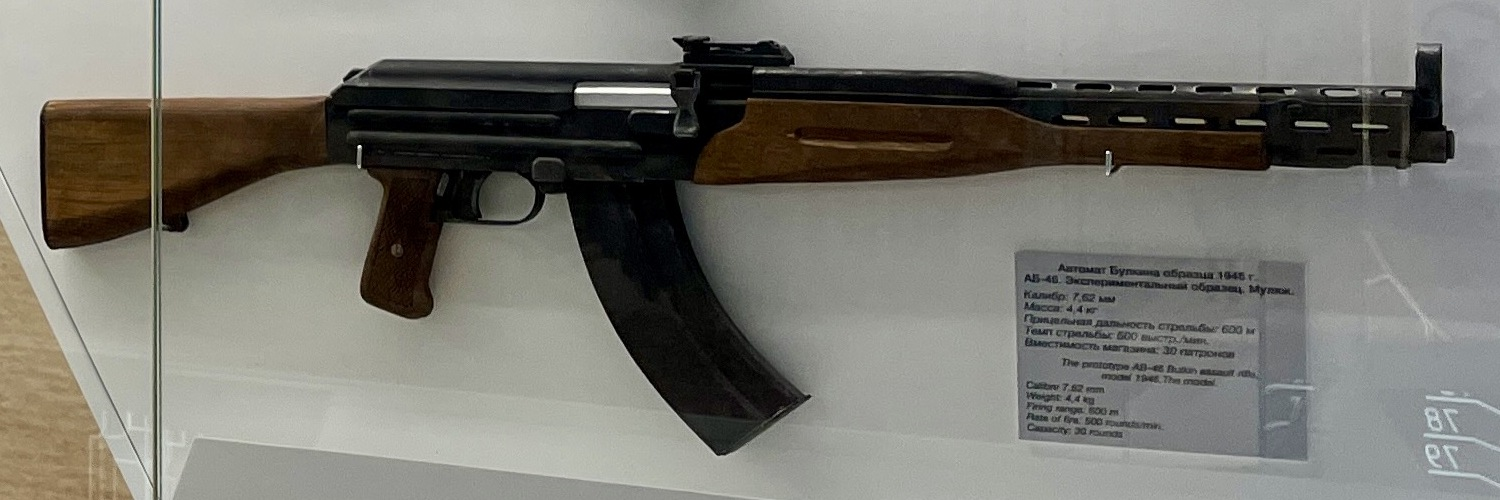
- Type: Assault rifle
- Place of origin: Soviet Union

Production history
- Designer: Aleksei Bulkin
- Designed: c. 1946
- Manufacturer: Tula Arms Plant
- Variants: TKB-452

Specifications
- Mass: 4.43 kg (9.8 lb) (unloaded)
- Length: 946 mm (37.2 in)
- Barrel length: 500 mm (20 in)
- Cartridge: 7.62×39mm
- Action: Rotating bolt, Gas-operated
- Rate of fire: 500 rounds/min
- Maximum firing range: 800 m (2,600 ft)
- Feed system: 30-round detachable box magazine
- Sights: Adjustable iron sights

The TKB-415 (Russian: ТКБ-415), also known as the AB-46 (Russian: АБ-46) is a prototype assault rifle developed by Tula TsKB-14 designer, Aleksei Alekseevich Bulkin. It competed in Soviet rifle trials to replace the SKS, ultimately being beaten out by the AK-47.

== Testing ==
The Bulkin AB-46 / TKB-415 assault rifle was in the lead until the end of December 1947. In January 1948, the tests were completed. Only the Bulkin AB-46 / TKB-415 assault rifle, when firing in short bursts from a rest under the forend, showed accuracy that satisfied the TTT, and also together with A. A. Dementyev's KB-P-410 rifle, as in previous tests, consistently showed slightly better results in accuracy of fire with automatic fire from unstable positions. In terms of simplicity of design, ease of disassembly and assembly, and maintenance during firing, the Bulkin assault rifle was equivalent to the Kalashnikov assault rifle. However, the AB-46 / TKB-415 assault rifle failed to solve the problem of reliability in weapon parts, which determined its loss in the competition. At the final, ten-day testing in January 1948, the AK received first place.

== Design ==
The Bulkin AB-46 / TKB-415 assault rifle is gas-operated, with a non-adjustable gas port located above the barrel, a long-stroke gas piston, and a two-lug rotating bolt.

In the hole of the bolt stem there is a rotating combat cylinder with two lugs. On the initial path of the bolt stem rollback, it turns the combat cylinder until its two lugs disengage with the supporting surfaces of the breech, after which the rolling stem picks up the larva and moves with it. The stem guides are the bends of a stamped bolt box with a minimum contact area, which makes the moving system insensitive to contamination.

The hammer-type trigger mechanism, with interception of the trigger, allows firing in single shots and in bursts. This is a unique mechanism, characterized by simplicity due to the fact that it does not have a device that disconnects the trigger from the sear when firing in single shot. The trigger, cocked by the rolling bolt stem, in the cocked position is captured by a spring-loaded stop on the trigger, and when the trigger is released, the trigger is intercepted by the sear protrusion of the trigger.

The flag-type fire mode switch safety is located on the right side of the weapon on the fire control handle, in front of the trigger. On the latest samples, the barrel was shortened by 100 mm, and the safety switch was moved to the left side of the weapon in a position more convenient for operating it with the thumb of the right hand. Sights consist of an adjustable front sight, protected by a front sight, and a sector sight. The cartridges are fed from a double-stack, double-feed 30-round box magazine made from stamped and welded sheet steel.
