= Afanasev Makarov AM-23 =

AM-23 aircraft cannon
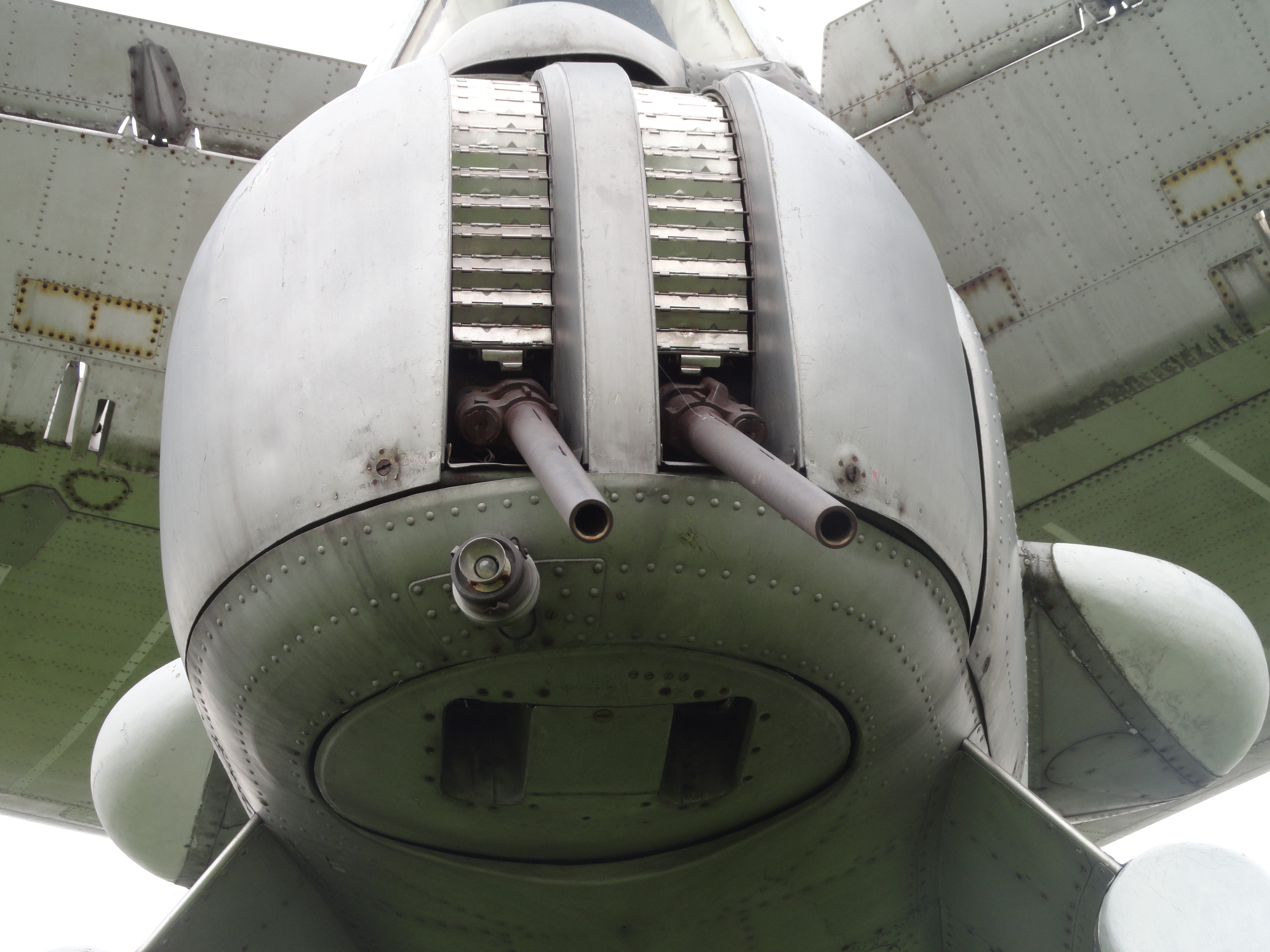
- Type: Double-barrel Autocannon
- Place of origin: Soviet Union

Service history
- Used by: Soviet Union, Russia, China

Production history
- Designer: Nikolay M. Afanasev, Nikolay F. Makarov
- Designed: 1954
- Manufacturer: Tulamashzavod, Tula
- Produced: 1953 – late 1970s
- Variants: Norinco Type 23–2

Specifications
- Mass: 43 kg (95 lb)
- Length: 1,467 mm (4 ft 10 in)
- Barrel length: 1 m (3 ft 3 in) barrel length
- Width: 166 mm (6.5 in)
- Height: 175 mm (7 in)
- Cartridge: 23x115 mm
- Caliber: 23 mm (0.9 in)
- Barrels: 2
- Action: Gas
- Rate of fire: 1,250 rpm
- Muzzle velocity: 710 m/s (2,300 ft/s)
- Effective firing range: up to 2 km (1.2 mi)
- Feed system: Belt

The Afanasev Makarov AM-23 is a Soviet designed aircraft autocannon that has been used in a number of aircraft in the Soviet Air Force. Its GRAU index was 9-A-036. It was often used in place of the earlier and slower-firing Nudelman-Rikhter NR-23.

In 1953 the first strategic jet bomber, the Tu-16, was introduced into the Soviet Air Force. A new 23 mm cannon was needed for the defensive turrets of this bomber, which was supposed to be more compact and faster firing than the NR-23. The designers Nikolay M. Afanasev and Nikolay F. Makarov from the TsKB-14 design bureau scaled-up the A-12.7 12.7 mm machine gun to create a 23 mm aircraft cannon. The TKB-495 (TKB - Tool'skoye Konstrooktorskoye Byuro – Tula design bureau) achieved a maximum rate of 1,350 rounds per minute during the tests and in May 1954, roughly double that of the NR-23. It was officially renamed the AM-23 in honour of its designers.

The Tu-16 bomber was armed with a total of seven AM-23 cannon. A single cannon was fixed in the nose of the aircraft, and the others were mounted in pairs in the defensive turrets. The Tu-95 bomber was in most versions equipped with a total of six AM-23 cannon located in three defensive turrets. Later, the tail turret of the Tu-95 was completely replaced by an electronic countermeasures installation, which resulted in the Tu-95MS. Apart from the Tu-16 and Tu-95, the AM-23 cannon was also installed on the Antonov An-8, An-12B, B-8, B-10, Ilyushin Il-54, Il-76, Myasishchev M-4, 3M and M-6 bombers and cargo aircraft.

The AM-23 was also adapted for use on naval vessels, designated AN-23 and mounted on the Project 125 hydrofoils.

China bought a licence to produce a copy of the AM-23 cannon, which they designate Type 23-2.

== Mechanism ==
The AM-23 aircraft cannon is a gas-operated weapon with a vertically moving wedge breechblock. Two jointed chambering levers are pivoted from the actuating slide. The upper, longer lever is used to ram the cartridge from the belt link into the chamber. An extraction claw on its forward end is used to extract the fired cartridge case. The lower lever protrudes into the weapon housing and has a U-shaped recess on its lower end. As the actuating slide moves back and forth, a lug in the weapon housing is cammed into this recess to guide the chambering levers. The 12.7mm A-12.7 aircraft machine gun and the 23mm ZSU anti-aircraft gun are essentially identical in design and operation.

The AM-23 differs from the ZSU anti-aircraft cannon in having a gas buffer where the ZSU has a disk spring buffer. The propellant gas conducted into the buffer is used to soften the impact of the actuating slide when it reaches the back plate. The compressed gas inside the buffer is then used to impart a considerable forward velocity to the actuating slide to start counter-recoil. Ammunition may be fed from either the left or from the right side. Fired cartridge cases are ejected through a port on the underside of the receiver and empty belt links drop out of the feed mechanism at the opposite side from which the belt was fed. A pneumatic charging mechanism is used to charge the cannon and to clear misfires.

== Ammunition ==
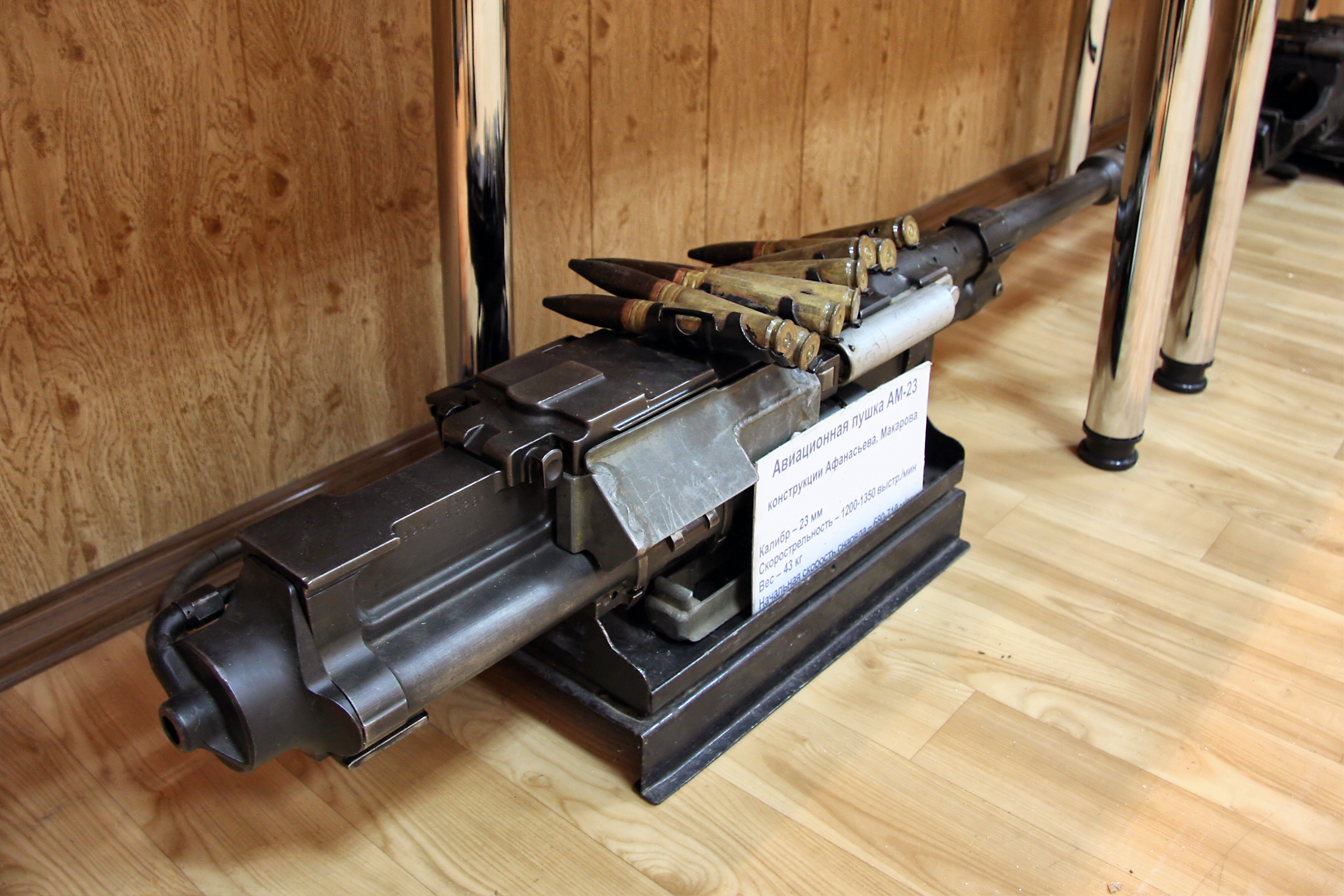
AM-23 aircraft cannon and its 23x115 mm ammunition are displayed in Museum of Long Range Aviation.

For the AM-23 aircraft cannon a new series of improved caliber 23×115 mm ammunition was developed. This used a new propellant with much higher performance, allowing increased muzzle velocity from a shorter barrel.

Although NS-23 and AM-23 ammunition is dimensionally the same, it is not permitted to fire NS-23 and NR-23 ammunition in the AM-23 or GSh-23. However, AM-23 ammunition can be fired safely in the NS-23 and NR-23. To instantly distinguish AM-23 cartridges from the NS-23 ammunition, the AM-23 projectiles have a 4mm wide white coloured band on the side.

Projectile types include high explosive incendiary, high explosive incendiary tracer, armour piercing high explosive, armour piercing incendiary, armour piercing incendiary tracer, chaff expelling (countermeasure projectile), flare expelling (countermeasure projectile) and target practice types.

== Sources ==
- Koll, Christian (2009). Soviet Cannon - A Comprehensive Study of Soviet Arms and Ammunition in Calibres 12.7mm to 57mm. Austria: Koll. p. 153. ISBN 978-3-200-01445-9.
