= OTs-14 Groza =

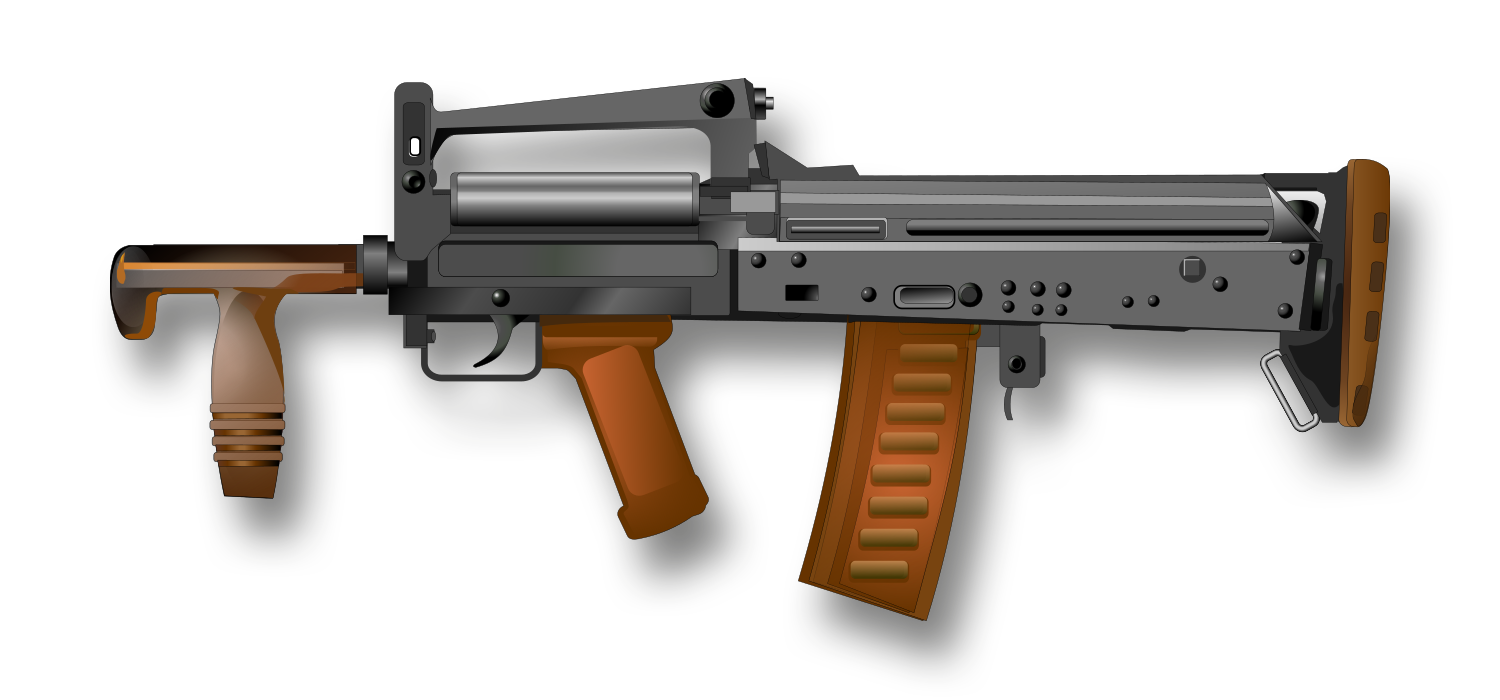
- OTs-14-4A-01 Groza
- Type: Bullpup assault rifle
- Place of origin: Russia

Service history
- In service: 1994–present (limited use)
- Used by: See Users
- Wars: Chechen–Russian conflict Russo-Georgian War

Production history
- Designer: V.N. Telesh; Y.V. Lebedev
- Designed: December 1992–1994
- Manufacturer: TsKIB SOO
- Produced: early 1994–1999
- Variants: See Variants

Specifications
- Mass: OTs-14-4A: 3.97 kg (with 1.23 kg grenade launcher derived from GP-25); OTs-14-4A-01: 2.93 kg (with vertical foregrip); OTs-14-4A-02: 2,74 kg; OTs-14-4A-03: 3.96 kg (with 0.48 kg suppressor and 0.36 kg optical scope);
- Length: 610 mm (OTs-14-4A); 565 mm (OTs-14-4A-01); 500 mm (OTs-14-4A-02); 720 mm (OTs-14-4A-03)
- Barrel length: 240 mm (Groza-4); 420 mm (Groza-1)
- Width: 60 mm (OTs-14-4A without a grenade launcher); 75 mm (OTs-14-4A with a grenade launcher mounted); 70 mm (OTs-14-1A without a grenade launcher); 80 mm (OTs-14-1A with a grenade launcher mounted)
- Height: 294 mm (OTs-14-4A without a grenade launcher); 266 mm (OTs-14-4A with a grenade launcher mounted); 350 mm (OTs-14-1A without a grenade launcher); 320 mm (OTs-14-1A with a grenade launcher mounted)
- Cartridge: 9×39mm (Groza-4); 7.62×39mm (Groza-1)
- Action: Gas-operated, rotating bolt
- Rate of fire: 700–750 rounds/min
- Muzzle velocity: 300 m/s (980 ft/s) (Groza-4); 720 m/s (2,400 ft/s) (Groza-1)
- Effective firing range: 200 m (220 yd) (Groza-4); 300 m (330 yd)(Groza-1)
- Maximum firing range: 400 m (440 yd)(Groza-4); 500 m (550 yd) (Groza-1)
- Feed system: 20-round detachable box magazine (Groza-4); 30-round detachable box magazine (Groza-1)
- Sights: Iron sights, several optical and night vision sights

The OTs-14 "Groza" (Russian: ОЦ-14-4 "Гроза", lit. 'Thunderstorm') is a Russian selective fire bullpup assault rifle chambered for the 9×39mm subsonic cartridge. It was developed in the 1990s at the TsKIB SOO (Central Design and Research Bureau of Sporting and Hunting Arms) in Tula, Russia.

The OTs-14 "Groza" has three confirmed derivatives, the OTs-14-1A "Groza-1" (TKB-0239 (ТКБ-0239)) chambered for the 7.62×39mm cartridge, OTs-14-2A "Groza-2", a rare prototype chambered in 5.45x39mm and the OTs-14-4A "Groza-4", chambered in 9x39mm.

The Groza saw limited use in the Second Chechen War and Russo-Georgian War before being phased out. However, OTs-14 are still used by some police forces across Russia.

== History ==
The weapon's chief designers were Valery Telesh, responsible for the GP-25 and GP-30 under-barrel grenade launchers, and Yuri Lebedev. The team set out to design an integrated and modular system that would incorporate all the best features of a close-combat long gun into a single weapon based on the AKS-74U. Their first attempt at this was the OTs-12 Tiss which was not put into mass production.

Afterwards, Telesh and Lebedev made a bullpup configuration which would become the OTs-14-4A Groza. Work on the new rifle began in December 1992. Prototypes of the OTs-14 were ready for testing in less than a year and the weapon was ready for production by early 1994.

It was first presented to the public at the MILIPOL Moscow trade show in April 1994 and adopted by the Ministry of Internal Affairs (MVD) shortly thereafter. The success of the OTs-14-4A in the hands of MVD personnel brought it to the attention of the Ministry of Defence (MO), who also had a requirement for such a weapon. After a period of testing, the weapon was adopted for Spetsnaz forces and some airborne and specialist front-line combat units such as combat engineers.

The Groza was originally intended to have used any one of four cartridges: 5.45×39mm, 5.56×45mm NATO, 7.62×39mm or 9×39mm. That idea was dropped and the assault rifle was originally chambered in 9×39mm to meet the MVD's requirement for a close combat weapon for deployment in Chechnya, for situations when the user needs to take on hostiles silently. This is why they used the subsonic ammo: 9×39mm, 5.45×39mm would later be used in minor cases.

== Design details ==
The OTs-14 "Groza" uses the internal mechanism of the AKS-74U, but in a bullpup configuration and chambered for 9×39 SP-6 subsonic ammunition. The trigger and pistol grip are part of a modular unit that can be swapped with an alternative unit that has an integrated 40 mm grenade launcher. When the grenade launcher unit is attached, the trigger controls both the grenade launcher and the rifle itself. Whether the rifle or grenade launcher barrel will be fired when the trigger is pulled is determined by the selector switch. The grenade launcher can use the same grenades used in the GP-25/GP-30.

The safety and firing mode selector of the AKS-74U pattern is retained. The barrel itself can be fitted with a specially designed quickly detachable suppressor.

The OTs-14's carrying handle has provisions for mounting long-range optical sights, red dot sights or night vision devices. As it was meant to replace the AKS-74U in the battalions of Spetsnaz MVD as a standard service firearm there are also variants chambered for 7.62×39mm. The idea behind this design was to have an easily modified basic version which would be used in different combat scenarios as a carbine, assault rifle with a foregrip, silenced assault rifle with detachable suppressor and assault rifle with an integrated under-barrel grenade launcher.

=== Operating mechanism ===
The OTs-14-4A is a small arms weapon system based on the 5.45×39mm AKS-74U carbine. It is a selective fire, air-cooled magazine-fed rifle with a gas-operated piston and a rotating bolt locking mechanism.

=== Features ===
The OTs-14-4A shares three-quarters of its components with the AKS-74U. The basic components of the weapon are borrowed directly from the AKS-74U assault rifle and slightly modified, simplifying the design as a whole and making the weapon considerably cheaper. The weapon has modular design allowing for assembly of one of four weapon versions depending on the assigned mission. It is configured in a bullpup layout for increased portability and balance. The grip is displaced forward, making the assault rifle compact, suitable for concealed carrying and evenly balanced so that it can be fired like a handgun with one hand. The bullpup configuration has been called hard to carry due to its weight, and the position of the Kalashnikov action close to the user's face can make it difficult to operate.

The weapon fires from a closed bolt and has a hammer-type firing mechanism. On the left side of the receiver is a three-position selector switch which in one position acts as a manual safety and prevents the rifle from being fired; the other two positions select whether the rifle or the grenade launcher will fire when the trigger is pulled. The assault rifle is equipped with iron sights in the carrying handle that consist of an adjustable rear aperture sight on a tangent leaf with range graduations from 50 to 200 m, and a forward post. The grenade launcher is aimed using a folding leaf sight.

The weapon will also accept several optical sights, including the PSO telescopic sights which mount directly onto the carrying handle. On early models the sights mount onto a bracket on the left side of the receiver housing. The OTs-14-4A also has a night sight dovetail rail that will accept all standard night vision optics.

=== Accessories ===
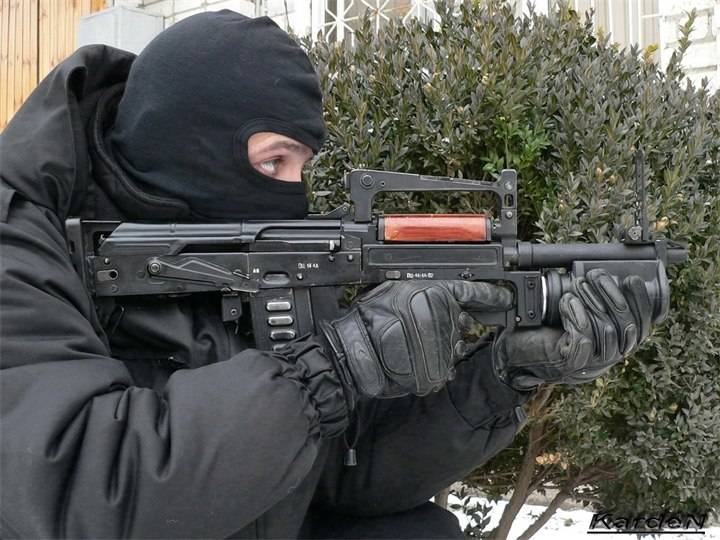
OTs-14 "Groza"

The OTs-14 is issued in an aluminium transport case with equipment and accessories for a wide array of tactical situations. Included in the case are two different grip and trigger assemblies, one for use with the modified GP-25/30 grenade launcher and another for use when the launcher is detached. When the grenade launcher is installed, the combined rifle and grenade launcher is operated with a single trigger.

A selector switch on the left side of the grip, near the trigger guard, allows the user to select between rifle or grenade barrels. The grenade launcher is replaced by a vertical foregrip when it is detached. A suppressor is also included in the standard kit, as is a quick-change short barrel for use with the suppressor or for when minimum overall length is desired.

== Variants ==
=== Groza-4 ===
- OTs-14-4A 9/40 Groza-4 – Primary model, chambered in 9×39mm Subsonic with a grenade launcher that has foldable iron sights. It uses the same 20-round magazines as the OTs-12 ("Yew tree") assault rifle. It was adopted in 1994 by the Ministry of the Interior's OMON Special Operations troops.
  - OTs-14-4A-01 – Rifle configuration with a short barrel and a vertical foregrip.
  - OTs-14-4A-02 – Carbine configuration with a short barrel threaded for a suppressor.
  - OTs-14-4A-03 – Special/Sniper configuration with a short barrel threaded for a suppressor and a telescopic sight bracket on the carrying handle / iron sights.

=== Groza-1 ===
- OTs-14-1A Groza-1 – Primary model chambered in 7.62×39mm M43 Soviet; it uses the same magazines and parts as the AK-47 / AKM assault rifles. Originally an experimental chambering, it was later adopted by the Army in 1998 for use by its Airborne, Combat Engineering, and Spetsnaz troops. It has more hitting power and range than the subsonic version and can use cheaper ammunition readily available from supplies. Not fully developed and placed into production due to cancellation of funding. The receiver was based on the AKM and the flash hider is based on the AK-74.
  - Groza-1 Special Mission Configuration – Variant of the Groza-1 with a riflescope and suppressor for special forces operations.
  - OTs-14-1A-01 – Carbine Variant with a short barrel and a vertical foregrip, which acts to stabilize the weapon when used in full auto. The foregrip is also used to act as a flash hider.
  - OTs-14-1A-02 – Special Carbine Variant with a short barrel threaded for a suppressor. This is intended for users involved in urban warfare operations.
  - OTs-14-1A-03 – Special Sniper Variant with a short barrel threaded for a suppressor and a telescopic sight bracket on the carrying handle / iron sights.
  - OTs-14-1A-04 7,62/40 – Grenade Launcher variant with a long barrel and a GP-30 under-barrel grenade launcher.
- OTs-14-2A – Experimental model chambered in 5.45×39mm M74 Soviet. Not adopted due to redundancy caused by preference for the better ballistic performance of the 7.62×39mm round when fired through a short barrel.
- OTs-14-3A – Experimental model chambered in 5.56×45mm NATO. Neither adopted nor put into production due to lack of additional funding for production of the variant.

== Users ==
- Georgia
- Russia: MVD forces in Chechnya.

== Bibliography ==
- Cutshaw, Charlie (1998). The New World of Russian Small Arms & Ammo. Boulder, Colorado, USA: Paladin Press. pp. 21–26. ISBN 0-87364-993-1.
- Roodhorst, Cor (2015). The Kalashnikov Encyclopedia: Recognition and Weapon Forensic Guide for Kalashnikov Arms and Derivatives II: Italy-Russia. Netherlands: Roodhorst Publications. ISBN 978-90-9027549-9.
