= Dlugov assault rifle =

- Type: Assault rifle
- Place of origin: Soviet Union

Production history
- Designer: Dlugov
- Designed: 1953

Specifications
- Cartridge: 7.62×39mm
- Caliber: 7.62mm
- Action: Blowback
- Feed system: 30-round detachable box magazine
- Sights: Iron sights

The Dlugov assault rifle (автомат Длугова) was a prototype assault rifle of Soviet origin. The weapon used a blowback operation and was chambered in the 7.62×39mm round. It was proposed as an alternative to the gas operated AK-47, but the Dlugov turned out ineffective and was rejected.

== See also ==
- FAMAS
- TKB-517
- List of assault rifles
