= TKB-059 =

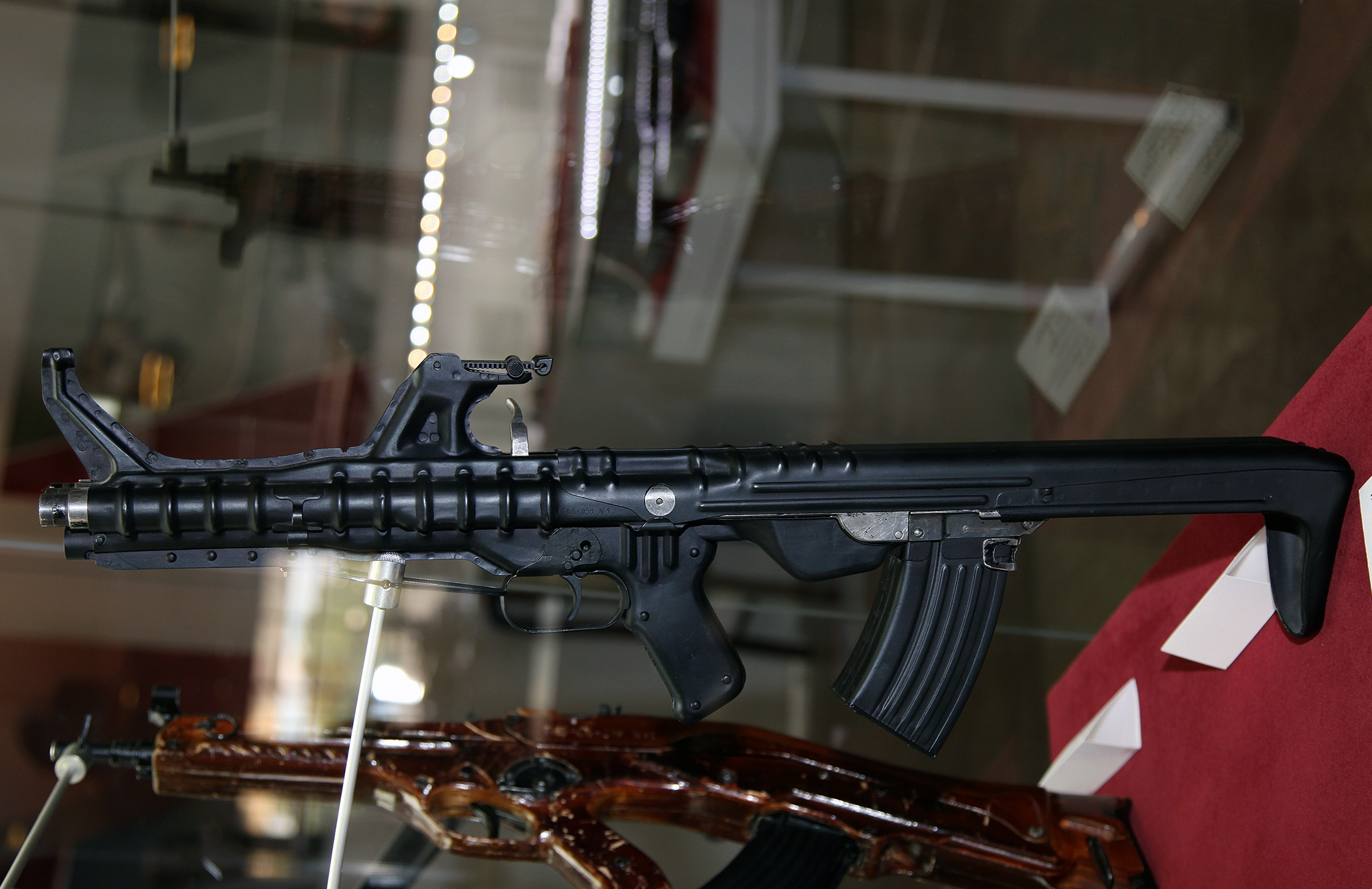
- A ТКБ-059 displayed at Tula Arms Museum
- Type: Bullpup assault rifle
- Place of origin: Soviet Union

Production history
- Designer: German A. Korobov
- Designed: 1962–1966
- Manufacturer: Tula Arms Plant
- Produced: 1966 (TKB-059)
- Variants: Device 3B; TKB-059

Specifications
- Mass: 3.85kg
- Length: 690 mm
- Barrel length: 430 mm
- Cartridge: 7.62×39mm
- Caliber: 7.62mm
- Barrels: 3
- Action: Gas-operated
- Rate of fire: 1400–1800 rounds/min
- Feed system: 45-round detachable box three-row magazine
- Sights: Iron sights

The TKB-059 (Russian: ТКБ-059) was a Soviet three-barrel bullpup assault rifle, capable of fully automatic fire and chambered for the 7.62×39mm rounds Manufactured by Tula Arms Plant in 1966, it was heavily based on the Device 3B (Прибор 3Б), which was an earlier experimental assault rifle that also had three barrels. Both weapons were developed by the small arms designer German A. Korobov.

Both the TKB-059 and the Device 3B used a specialized 7.62×39mm magazine with three columns, akin to three individual box magazines placed and attached side by side. There were two sizes of magazine: one with a total capacity of 45 rounds (15 rounds per column), and one with a capacity of 60 rounds (20 rounds per column). Each of the three barrel was independently fed from its corresponding column. The TKB-059 could be fired ambidextrously as the spent cartridge casings ejected downwards behind the magazines.

The TKB-059 prototype can now be seen at the Tula arms museum.

== See also ==
- 80.002
- AO-46
- AO-63
- TKB-408
- TKB-517
- TKB-0146
- List of bullpup firearms
- List of assault rifles
