= TKB-517 =

Type of Assault rifle

- Type: Assault rifle
- Place of origin: Soviet Union

Production history
- Designer: German Korobov
- Designed: c. 1952
- Manufacturer: Tula Arms Plant
- Variants: TKB-317; TKB-454; TKB-516; TKB-523

Specifications
- Mass: 3.18 kg (7.0 lb) (unloaded); 3.5 kg (7.7 lb)(loaded with 30-round magazine)
- Length: 910 mm (36 in)
- Barrel length: 415 mm (16.3 in)
- Cartridge: 7.62×39mm
- Action: Lever-delayed blowback
- Rate of fire: 560 rounds/min
- Muzzle velocity: 720 m/s (2,400 ft/s)
- Effective firing range: 350–400 m (1,150–1,310 ft)
- Maximum firing range: 1,500 m (4,900 ft)
- Feed system: 30-round detachable box magazine Belt (TKB-516)
- Sights: Adjustable iron sights

The TKB-517 (Russian: ТКБ-517) is an assault rifle designed by German Aleksandrovich Korobov. This rifle was externally similar to the AK-47, but based on the lever-delayed blowback mechanism invented by John Pedersen and refined by Pál Király. It turned out to be more reliable, more accurate and controllable under full auto, and easier to produce and maintain. Like the AK series, it was also manufactured with folding stocks, longer, heavier barrels with bipods (forming light support weapons) and even a belt-fed variant. Its rejection was because of a greater proficiency with the AK-47 among the Soviet military.

== Design and features ==
The TKB-517 is externally similar to the AK-47 and field-strips similarly, but instead it uses lever-delayed blowback for its operation, slightly reducing recoil and making it more controllable. The receiver is made from pressed steel with laminated wood stock, grip and handguards.

== See also ==
- Dlugov assault rifle
- TKB-059
- TKB-408
- VAHAN
- List of assault rifles
