= TKB-0146 =

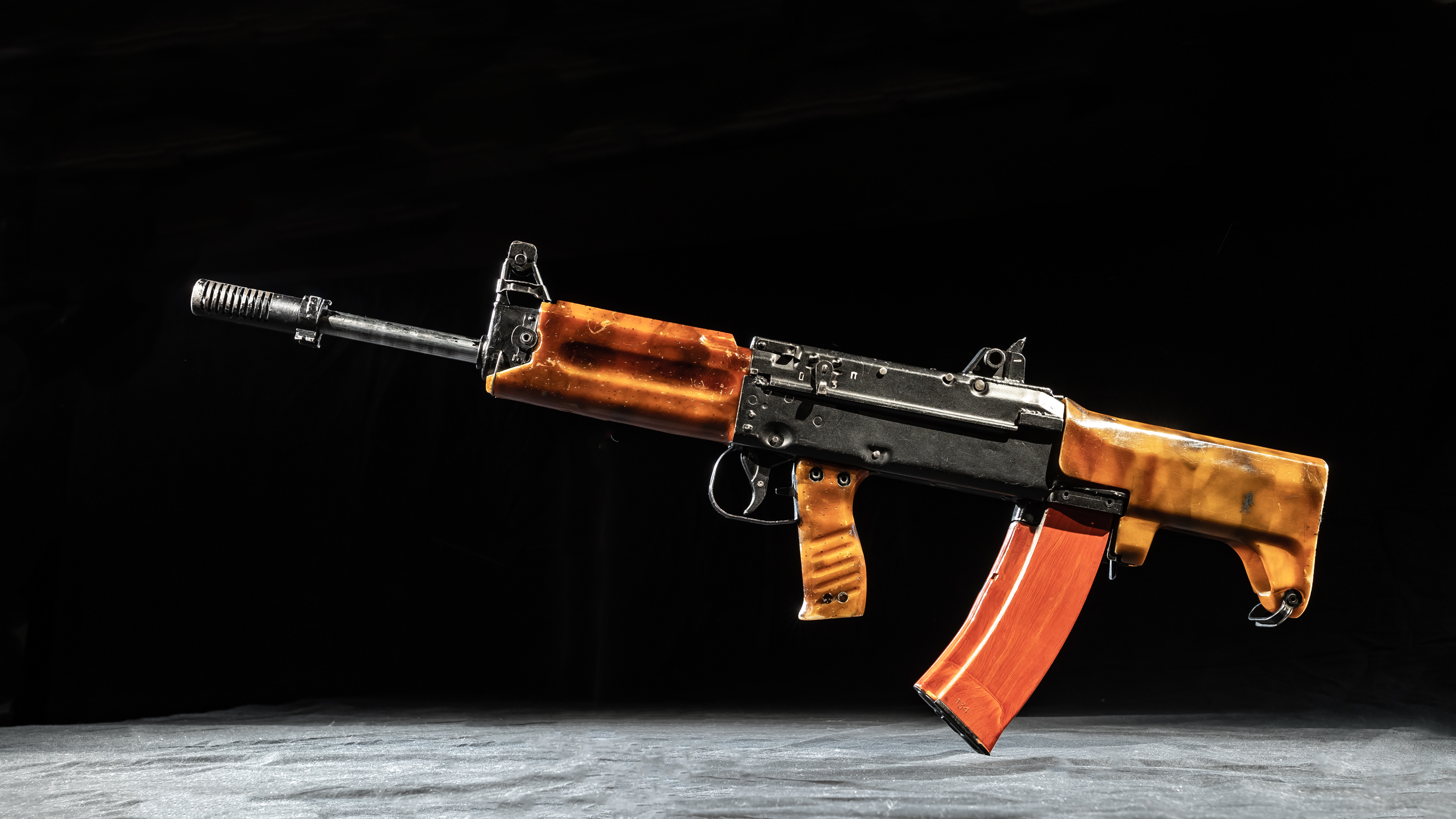
- Type: Bullpup assault rifle
- Place of origin: Soviet Union

Production history
- Designer: Igor Yakovlevich Stechkin

Specifications
- Mass: 3.8kg
- Length: 794mm
- Barrel length: 420mm
- Cartridge: 5.45×39mm
- Caliber: 5.45mm
- Rate of fire: 600 rpm (sustained); 2000 rpm (two-round burst)
- Muzzle velocity: 920m/s
- Feed system: 30-round AK-74 compatible box magazine
- Sights: Iron sights

The TKB-0146 (Russian: ТКБ-0146) is a bullpup assault rifle prototype designed by Igor Yakovlevich Stechkin at the TsKIB SOO. The gun participated in the Russian Army's Project Abakan assault rifle trials.

Nikonov's AS[M] and Stechkin's design were the only two truly innovative designs in the Abakan competition that made it to the final testing round; all the other 6 competitors that made it that far were based on more conventional designs. Stechkin's design could fire two-round bursts at 2000 rpm or sustained fire at 600 rpm. Stechkin's gun was slightly more accurate than Nikonov's, but turned out less reliable, mainly because it accumulated more fouling. Nikonov's design won and became the AN-94. In TKB-0146, switching from one-round semi-automatic to fully automatic fire was accomplished by a secondary trigger located behind the main trigger. Squeezing the main trigger slightly fired off a single round. Pulling it back fully, so that it pressed the secondary trigger, enabled fully automatic fire. Switching to the two-round burst mode was done by operating a different lever.

Two examples can be seen in the Tula arms museum; one of these is an early prototype that was configured for three-round bursts rather than two, which was the option for the later models.

== See also ==
- OTs-14 Groza
- TKB-059
- List of bullpup firearms
- List of assault rifles
