= List of Colt AR-15 and M16 rifle variants =

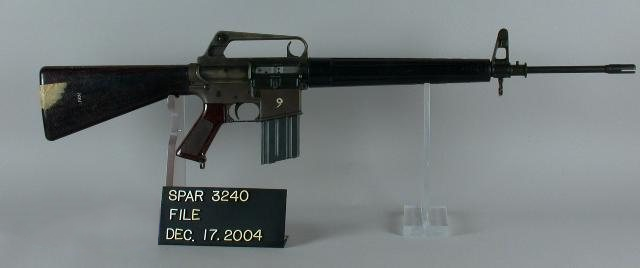
ArmaLite AR-15 with the charging handle located on top of the upper receiver, protected within the carrying handle and a 25-round magazine.

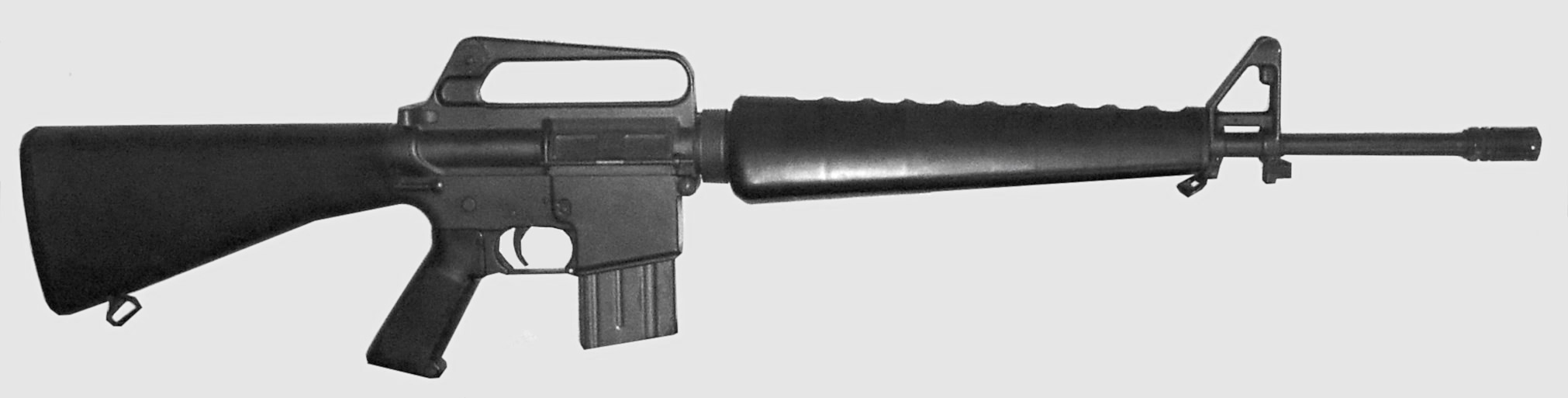
1973 Colt AR-15 SP1 rifle with "slab side" lower receiver (lacking raised boss around magazine release button) and original Colt 20-round magazine.

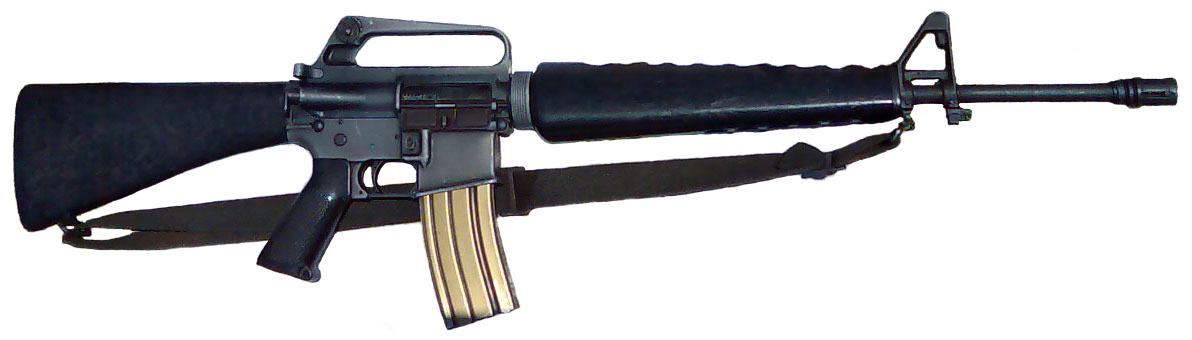
M16A1 rifle with forward assist, raised boss around magazine release button and a 30-round magazine.

This article describes the many variations of the Colt AR-15 and M16 rifle family of weapons produced by Colt's Manufacturing Company. Weapons patterned on the original ArmaLite AR-15 design have been produced by numerous manufacturers and have been used by nations around the world, some of which created their own variations. The tables here are split into a variety of categories and provide an overview of different subtypes. For purposes of these tables, bold model numbers are weapons used (or previously used) by the U.S. military while italic model numbers are weapons for commercial or export sale. See Glossary of terms for an explanation of each column.

== Colt military models ==
Colt has been the most visible producer of ArmaLite AR-15 pattern weapons, and the military designations M16 and M4 are heavily associated with the company. Colt has an intricate internal nomenclature system for its models, with a variety of suffixes and prefixes. Colt's systems have generally followed the times and though its model numbers originally came without prefixes, with the need to separate weapons made for civilian consumption from those made for military and law enforcement use, military models became prefixed with the code "R0". For the purposes of this table, the R0 nomenclature is obviated as this terminology did not exist in all cases, but it can be understood to be present. Military/LE models are also easily identified by their three-digit code in contrast to the four-digit codes for civilian weapons.

=== Colt Armalite AR-15 ===
The original Armalite AR-15 models have the charging handle located on top of the upper receiver, protected within the carrying handle.

Colt model no.	Name	Stock	Hand guards	Fire control	Rear sight	Forward assist	Case deflector	Caliber	Barrel length	Barrel profile	Barrel twist	Bayonet Lug	Muzzle device
601	ArmaLite AR-15	A1	Triangular	S-1-F	A1	No	No	.223 REM	20 in.	A1	1:14 (early); 1:12 (late)	Yes	Type 1 Duckbill; Type 2 Duckbill
602	ArmaLite AR-15 (USAF)	A1	Triangular	S-1-F	A1	No	No	.223 REM	20 in.	A1	1:12	Yes	Type 2 Duckbill

=== Colt M16 Rifle, M4 Carbine based weapons ===
Colt model no.	Name	Stock	Hand guards	Fire control	Rear sight	Forward assist	Case deflector	Caliber	Barrel length	Barrel profile	Barrel twist	Bayonet Lug	Muzzle device
603	XM16E1; M16A1	A1	Triangular	S-1-F	A1	Yes	No	.223 REM	20 in.	A1	1:12	Yes	Type 2 Duckbill or A1 Birdcage
603	M16S1 (produced by Chartered Industries of Singapore)	A1	Triangular	S-1-F	A1	Yes	No	.223 REM	20 in.	A1	1:12	Yes	A1 Birdcage
603K	M16A1 (produced by Daewoo Precision Industries)	A1	Triangular	S-1-F	A1	Yes (conical)	No	.223 REM	20 in.	A1	1:12	Yes	A1 Birdcage
604	M16	A1	Triangular	S-1-F	A1	No	No	.223 REM	20 in.	A1	1:12	Yes	A1 Birdcage
605	CAR-15 Dissipator	A1	Triangular	S-1-F	A1	No	No	.223 REM	15 in.	A1	1:12	No	Type 2 Duckbill
605A	CAR-15 Dissipator (bolt assist)	A1	Triangular	S-1-F	A1	Yes	No	.223 REM	15 in.	A1	1:12	No	Type 2 Duckbill
605B	CAR-15 Dissipator (burst control)	A1	Triangular	S-F-1-3	A1	No	No	.223 REM	15 in.	A1	1:12	No	Type 2 Duckbill
606	CAR-15 HBAR	A1	Triangular	S-1-F	A1	No	No	.223 REM	20 in.	HBAR	1:12	Yes	Type 2 Duckbill
606A	CAR-15 HBAR (bolt assist)	A1	Triangular	S-1-F	A1	Yes	No	.223 REM	20 in.	HBAR	1:12	Yes	Type 2 Duckbill
606B	CAR-15 HBAR (burst control)	A1	Triangular	S-F-1-3	A1	Yes	No	.223 REM	20 in.	HBAR	1:12	Yes	Type 2 Duckbill
607	CAR-15 XM607	1st Generation	Short Triangular	S-1-F	A1	No	No	.223 REM	10 in.	A1	1:12	No	Type 1 and 2 Duckbill and 3.5" Moderator
607A	CAR-15 XM607 (bolt assist)	1st Generation	Short Triangular	S-1-F	A1	Yes	No	.223 REM	10 in.	A1	1:12	No	Type 1 and 2 Duckbill and 3.5" Moderator
607B	CAR-15 XM607 (burst control)	1st Generation	Short Triangular	S-F-1-3	A1	No	No	.223 REM	10 in.	A1	1:12	No	Type 1 and 2 Duckbill and 3.5" Moderator
608	CAR-15 Survival Rifle	Tubular	Short Round	S-1-F	A1	No	No	.223 REM	10 in.	A1	1:12	No	Conical or 3.5" Moderator
609	XM177E1 Commando	2nd Generation	Short Ribbed	S-1-F	A1	Yes	No	.223 REM	10 in.	A1	1:12	No	3.5" or 4.5" Moderator
610	XM177 (GAU 5/A) Commando SMG	2nd Generation	Short Ribbed	S-1-F	A1	No	No	.223 REM	10 in.	A1	1:12	No	3.5" or 4.5" Moderator
610B	GAU 5/A	2nd Generation	Short Ribbed	S-F-1-3	A1	No	No	.223 REM	10 in.	A1	1:12	No	3.5" or 4.5" Moderator
611	M16A1 HBAR	A1	Triangular	S-1-F	A1	Yes	No	.223 REM	20 in.	HBAR	1:12	Yes	A1 Birdcage
611P	M16A1 HBAR (produced by Elisco Tools)	A1	Triangular	S-1-F	A1	Yes	No	.223 REM	20 in.	HBAR	1:12	Yes	A1 Birdcage
613	M16A1 (export variant, FMS)	A1	Triangular	S-1-F	A1	Yes	No	.223 REM	20 in.	A1	1:12	Yes	A1 Birdcage
613P	M16A1 (produced by Elisco Tools)	A1	Triangular	S-1-F	A1	Yes	No	.223 REM	20 in.	A1	1:12	Yes	A1 Birdcage
615	M16 HBAR	A1	Triangular	S-1-F	A1	No	No	.223 REM	20 in.	HBAR	1:12	Yes	A1 Birdcage
616	M16 HBAR	A1	Round	S-1-F	A1	No	No	.223 REM	20 in.	HBAR	1:12	Yes	A1 Birdcage
619	XM177E1 Commando (export variant, FMS)	2nd Generation	Short Ribbed	S-1-F	A1	Yes	No	.223 REM	10 in.	A1	1:12	No	3.5" or 4.5" Moderator
620	XM177 (GAU 5/A) Commando (export variant, FMS)	2nd Generation	Short Ribbed	S-1-F	A1	No	No	.223 REM	10 in.	A1	1:12	No	3.5" or 4.5" Moderator
621	M16A1 HBAR	A1	Triangular	S-1-F	A1	Yes	No	.223 REM	20 in.	HBAR	1:12	Yes	A1 Birdcage
629	Colt XM177E2	2nd Generation	Short Ribbed	S-1-F	A1	Yes	No	.223 REM or 5.56 NATO	11.5 in.	A1	1:12	No	4.5" Moderator
630	GAU 5/A	2nd Generation	Short Ribbed	S-1-F	A1	No	No	.223 REM	11.5 in.	A1	1:12	No	4.5" Moderator
633	Colt SMG	2nd Generation	Short Round	S-1-F	A1	No	Yes	9mm NATO	7 in.	A1	1:10	No	None
634	Colt SMG	2nd Generation	Short Ribbed	Conflict between S-1 and S-1-F	A1	No	Yes	9mm NATO	10 in.	A1	1:10	No	A1 Birdcage
635	Colt SMG	2nd, 3rd, or 4th Generation	Short Ribbed	S-1-F	A1	No	Yes	9mm NATO	10 in.	A1	1:10	No	A1 Birdcage
635SD	Colt SMG	2nd Generation	Short Ribbed	S-1-F	A1	No	Yes	9mm NATO	10 in.	A1 w/ integral silencer	1:10	No	None
639	XM177 Commando	2nd Generation	Short Ribbed	S-1-F	A1	Yes	No	.223 REM	11.5 in.	A1	1:12	No	4.5" Moderator or A1
639	Colt SMG	2nd	Short Ribbed	S-1-3	A1	No	Yes	9mm NATO	10 in.	A1 w/ integral silencer	1:10	No	A2 Compensator
640	XM177 Commando	2nd Generation	Short Ribbed	S-1-F	A1	No	No	.223 REM	11.5 in.	A1	1:12	No	4.5" Moderator or A1
645	M16A1E1	A1	Ribbed	S-1-3	A1 or A2	Yes	Yes	5.56 NATO	20 in.	A2	1:7	Yes	A2 Compensator
645E	M16A2E1	A2	Ribbed	S-1-3	Flattop (w/ flip down front sight)	Yes	Yes	5.56 NATO	20 in.	A2	1:7	Yes	A2 Compensator
646	M16A2E3	A2	Ribbed	S-1-F	A2	Yes	Yes	5.56 NATO	20 in.	A2	1:7	Yes	A2 Compensator
649	GAU 5/A	2nd Generation	Short Ribbed	S-1-F	A1	No	No	.223 REM	11.5 in.	A1	1:12	No	4.5" Moderator
650	M16A1 carbine/CAR15	A1	Short Ribbed	S-1-F	A1	Yes	No	.223 REM	14.5 in.	A1	1:12	Yes	A1 Birdcage
651	M16A1 carbine/CAR15	A1	Short Ribbed	S-1-F	A1	Yes	No	.223 REM	14.5 in.	A1	1:12	Yes	A1 Birdcage
652	M16A1 carbine/CAR15	A1	Short Ribbed	S-1-F	A1	No	No	.223 REM	14.5 in.	A1	1:12	Yes	A1 Birdcage
653	M16A1 carbine/CAR15	2nd Generation	Short Ribbed	S-1-F	A1	Yes	No	.223 REM	14.5 in.	A1	1:12	Yes	A1 Birdcage
653P	M16A1 carbine/CAR15 (License produced by Elisco Tools)	2nd Generation	Short Ribbed	S-1-F	A1	Yes	No	.223 REM	14.5 in.	A1	1:12	Yes	A1 Birdcage
654	M16A1 carbine/CAR15	2nd Generation	Short Ribbed	S-1-F	A1	No	No	.223 REM	14.5 in.	A1	1:12	Yes	A1 Birdcage
655	M16A1 Special High Profile	A1	Triangular	S-1-F	A1 (used with special raised carry handle scope mount)	Yes	No	.223 REM	20 in.	HBAR	1:12	Yes	A1
656	M16A1 Special Low Profile	A1	Triangular	S-1-F	Flattop	Yes	No	.223 REM	20 in.	HBAR	1:12	Yes	A1 Birdcage
701	M16A2	A2	Ribbed	S-1-F	A2	Yes	Yes	5.56 NATO	20 in.	A2	1:7	Yes	A2 Compensator
702	M16A2	A2	Ribbed	S-1-3	A2	Yes	Yes	5.56 NATO	20 in.	A2	1:7	Yes	A2 Compensator
703	M16A2 Prototype	A2	Ribbed	S-1-F	A2	Yes	Yes	5.56 NATO	20 in.	A1	1:7	Yes	A2 Compensator
705	M16A2	A2	Ribbed	S-1-3	A2	Yes	Yes	5.56 NATO	20 in.	A2	1:7	Yes	A2 Compensator
707	M16A2	A2	Ribbed	S-1-3	A2	Yes	Yes	5.56 NATO	20 in.	A1	1:7	Yes	A2 Compensator
708	M16A2 Enhanced	A2	Ribbed	S-1-3-F	A2	Yes	Yes	5.56 NATO	20 in.	A1	1:7	Yes	A2 Compensator
711	M16A2	A2	Ribbed	S-1-F	A1	Yes	No and Yes	5.56 NATO	20 in.	A1	1:7	Yes	A2 Compensator
713	M16A2	A2	Ribbed	S-1-3	A2	Yes	Yes	5.56 NATO	20 in.	A2	1:7	Yes	A2 Compensator
715	M16A2 (License produced by Diemaco/Colt Canada as the C7)	A2	Ribbed	S-1-F	A1	Yes	Yes	5.56 NATO	20 in.	A2	1:7	Yes	A2 Compensator
719	M16A2	A2	Ribbed	S-1-3	A2	Yes	Yes	5.56 NATO	20 in.	A1	1:7	Yes	A2 Compensator
720	XM4 Carbine	2nd Generation or 3rd Generation	Short Ribbed	S-1-F, S-1-3	A1 or A2	Earlier No, Later Yes	Earlier No, Later Yes	5.56 NATO	14.5 in.	A1 (Before), M4 (Current)	1:7	Yes	A1 or A2 Compensator
723	Colt 723 Delta Carbine	3rd Generation	Short Ribbed	S-1-F	A1	Earlier No, Later Yes	Earlier No, Later Yes	5.56 NATO	14.5 in.	Earlier A1, Later M4	1:7	Yes	A2 Compensator
725	M16A2 carbine (License produced by Diemaco/Colt Canada as the C8)	3rd Generation	Short Ribbed	S-1-F	A1	Yes	Yes	5.56 NATO	14.5 in.	A1	1:7	Yes	A2 Compensator
725A	M16A2 carbine	3rd Generation	Short Ribbed	S-1-F	A1	Yes	Yes	5.56 NATO	14.5 in.	A1	1:7	Yes	A2 Compensator
725B	M16A2 carbine	3rd Generation	Short Ribbed	S-1-F	A1	Yes	Yes	5.56 NATO	14.5 in.	A2	1:7	Yes	A2 Compensator
726	M16A2 carbine	3rd Generation	Short Ribbed	S-1-F	A1	Yes	Yes	5.56 NATO	14.5 in.	A1	1:7	Yes	A1 Birdcage
727	M16A2 Government Carbine	3rd Generation	Short Ribbed	S-1-F	A2	Yes	Yes	5.56 NATO	14.5 in.	M4	1:7	Yes	A2 Compensator
728	M16A2 carbine	3rd Generation	Short Ribbed	S-1-F	A2	Yes	Yes	5.56 NATO	14.5 in.	M4	1:7	Yes	A2 Compensator
733	M16A2 Commando	3rd or 4th Generation	Short Ribbed	S-1-F	A1 or A2	Yes	Yes or No	5.56 NATO	11.5 in.	A1 or A2	1:7	No	A1 or A2
733A	M16A2 Commando	3rd or 4th Generation	Short Ribbed	S-1-3	A1 or A2	Yes	Yes or No	5.56 NATO	11.5 in.	A1 or A2	1:7	No	A1 or A2
734	M16A2 Commando	3rd Generation	Short Ribbed	S-1-F	A1 or A2	Yes	Yes or No	5.56 NATO	11.5 in.	A1 or A2	1:7	No	A1 or A2
734A	M16A2 Commando	3rd Generation	Short Ribbed	S-1-3	A1 or A2	Yes	Yes or No	5.56 NATO	11.5 in.	A1 or A2	1:7	No	A1 or A2
735	M16A2 Commando	3rd or 4th Generation	Short Ribbed	S-1-3	A1 or A2	Yes	Yes or No	5.56 NATO	11.5 in.	A1 or A2	1:7	No	A1 or A2
737	M16A2	A2	Ribbed	S-1-3	A2	Yes	Yes	5.56 NATO	20 in.	HBAR	1:7	Yes	A2
738	M16A2 Commando Enhanced	3rd or 4th Generation	Short Ribbed	S-1-3-F	A2	Yes	Yes	5.56 NATO	11.5 in.	A2	1:7	No	A1 or A2
741	M16A2	A2	Ribbed	S-1-F	A2	Yes	Yes	5.56 NATO	20 in.	HBAR	1:7	Yes	A2
742	M16A2 (Standard w/ bipod)	A2	Ribbed	S-1-F	A2	Yes	Yes	5.56 NATO	20 in.	HBAR	1:7	Yes	A2
745	M16A2 (Standard w/ bipod)	A2	Ribbed	S-1-3	A2	Yes	Yes	5.56 NATO	20 in.	HBAR	1:7	Yes	A2
746	M16A2 (Standard w/ bipod)	A2	Ribbed	S-1-3	A2	Yes	Yes	5.56 NATO	20 in.	HBAR	1:7	Yes	A2
750	Colt M16 Automatic Rifle (Colt/Diemaco project)	A2	Square LMG	S-F	A2	Yes	Yes	5.56 NATO	20 in.	HBAR	1:7	Yes	A2
777	M4E1 Carbine	4th Generation	M4	S-1-F	A2	Yes	Yes	5.56 NATO	14.5 in.	M4	1:7	Yes	A2
778	M4 Carbine Enhanced	4th Generation	M4	S-1-3-F	A2	Yes	Yes	5.56 NATO	14.5 in.	M4	1:7	Yes	A2
779	M4 Carbine	4th Generation	M4	S-1-3	A2	Yes	Yes	5.56 NATO	14.5 in.	M4	1:7	Yes	A2
901	M16A3	A2	Ribbed, Rail/RIS	S-1-F	Flattop	Yes	Yes	5.56 NATO	20 in.	A2	1:7	Yes	A2
905	M16A4	A2	Ribbed, Rail/RIS	S-1-3	Flattop	Yes	Yes	5.56 NATO	20 in.	A2	1:7	Yes	A2
920	M4 Carbine	4th Generation	M4, Rail/RIS	S-1-3	Flattop	Yes	Yes	5.56 NATO	14.5 in.	M4	1:7	Yes	A2
921	M4A1	4th Generation	M4, Rail/RIS	S-1-F	Flattop	Yes	Yes	5.56 NATO	14.5 in.	M4	1:7	Yes	A2
921HB	M4A1	4th Generation	M4, Rail/RIS	S-1-F	Flattop	Yes	Yes	5.56 NATO	14.5 in.	M4 HBAR	1:7	Yes	A2
925	M4E2	3rd or 4th Generation	M4, Rail/RIS	S-1-F (Earlier), S-1-3 (Later)	Flattop	Yes	Yes	5.56 NATO	14.5 in.	M4	1:7	Yes	A2
927	M4 Government Carbine	4th Generation	M4, Rail/RIS	S-1-F	Flattop	Yes	Yes	5.56 NATO	14.5 in.	M4	1:7	Yes	A2
933	M4 Commando	4th Generation	M4, Rail/RIS	S-1-F	Flattop	Yes	Yes	5.56 NATO	11.5 in.	A1 or A2	1:7	No	A2
935	M4 Commando	4th Generation	M4, Rail/RIS	S-1-3	Flattop	Yes	Yes	5.56 NATO	11.5 in.	A1 or A2	1:7	No	A2
938	M4 Commando Enhanced	4th Generation	M4, Rail/RIS	S-1-3-F	Flattop	Yes	Yes	5.56 NATO	11.5 in.	A2	1:7	No	A2
941	M16A3	A2	Ribbed, Rail/RIS	S-1-F	Flattop	Yes	Yes	5.56 NATO	20 in.	HBAR	1:7	Yes	A2
942	M16A3 (Standard w/ bipod)	A2	Ribbed, Rail/RIS	S-1-F	Flattop	Yes	Yes	5.56 NATO	20 in.	HBAR	1:7	Yes	A2
945	M16A4	A2	Ribbed, Rail/RIS	S-1-3	Flattop	Yes	Yes	5.56 NATO	20 in.	A2	1:7	Yes	A2
950	Colt Automatic Rifle (Colt/Diemaco project)	A2	Square LMG	S-F	Flattop	Yes	Yes	5.56 NATO	20 in.	HBAR	1:7	Yes	A2
977	M4A1	4th Generation	M4, Rail/RIS	S-1-F	Flattop	Yes	Yes	5.56 NATO	14.5 in.	M4	1:7	Yes	A2
977HB	M4A1	4th Generation	M4, Rail/RIS	S-1-F	Flattop	Yes	Yes	5.56 NATO	14.5 in.	M4 HBAR	1:7	Yes	A2
978	M4 Carbine Enhanced	4th Generation	M4, Rail/RIS	S-1-3-F	Flattop	Yes	Yes	5.56 NATO	14.5 in.	M4	1:7	Yes	A2
979	M4 Carbine	4th Generation	M4, Rail/RIS	S-1-3	Flattop	Yes	Yes	5.56 NATO	14.5 in.	M4	1:7	Yes	A2
991	Colt SMG	4th Generation	M4, Rail/RIS	S-1-F	Flattop	No	Yes	9mm NATO	10.5 in.	A1	1:10	No	A1 Birdcage
992	Colt SMG	4th Generation	M4, Rail/RIS	S-1-3	Flattop	No	Yes	9mm NATO	10.5 in.	A1	1:10	No	A1 Birdcage
Colt model no.	Name	Stock	Hand guards	Fire control	Rear sight	Forward assist	Case deflector	Caliber	Barrel length	Barrel profile	Barrel twist	Bayonet Lug	Muzzle device

=== Colt military models without model numbers ===
In rare instances some Colt models have been produced without in house model numbers, or at least one which is readily apparent.

Name	Stock	Hand guards	Fire control	Rear sight	Forward assist	Case deflector	Caliber	Barrel length	Barrel profile	Barrel twist	Bayonet Lug	Muzzle device
M16 PIP	A2	Ribbed	S-1-F, S-1-3	A2	Yes	Yes	5.56 NATO	20 in.	A2	1:7	Yes	A1 or A2
Colt Advanced Combat Rifle	Retractable ACR	ACR Type	S-1-3 or S-1-F	Flattop	Yes	Yes	5.56 NATO	20 in.	A2	1:7	No	ACR compensator
M231 FPW	FPW Wire	Short Round	S-F	None	No	No	.223 REM	15.6 in.	HBAR	1:12	No	A1
M231 Recoil Operated Rifle	None	Short Round	S-F	None	No	No	.233 REM	15.6 in.	HBAR	1:12	No	A1
Colt Advanced Piston Carbine	4th Generation Retractable	Monolithic	S-1-F	Flattop	Yes	Yes	5.56 NATO	14.5 in.	Fluted	1:7	Yes	A2

=== Diemaco/Colt Canada models ===
The Canadian company Colt Canada (formerly Diemaco) licensed production of a rifle (Colt Model 715) and carbine (Colt Model 725), but later went on to produce an entire line of AR-15/M16 pattern weapons developed independently. In May 2005, Colt's Manufacturing Company acquired Diemaco, and the name was changed to Colt Canada.

Colt model no.	Diemaco model	Stock	Hand guards	Fire control	Rear sight	Forward assist	Case deflector	Caliber	Barrel length	Barrel profile	Barrel twist	Bayonet Lug	Muzzle device
715	C7	A2	Ribbed	S-1-F	A1	Yes	Yes	5.56 NATO	20 in.	A2	1:7	Yes	A2
N/A	C7A1	A2	Ribbed	S-1-F	Weaver	Yes	Yes	5.56 NATO	20 in.	A2	1:7	Yes	A2
N/A	C7A2	Canadian 3rd Generation	Ribbed	S-1-F	Weaver	Yes	Yes	5.56 NATO	20 in.	A2	1:7	Yes	A2
750	Colt/Diemaco LMG/LSW	A2	Square LMG	S-F	A2	Yes	Yes	5.56 NATO	20 in.	HBAR	1:7	No	A2
N/A	LSW	A2	Square LMG	S-F	Weaver	Yes	Yes	5.56 NATO	20 in.	HBAR	1:7	No	A2
725	C8	3rd Generation	Short Ribbed	S-1-F	A1	Yes	Yes	5.56 NATO	14.5 in.	A1	1:7	Yes	A2
N/A	C8A1	Canadian 3rd Generation	Short Ribbed	S-1-F	Weaver	Yes	Yes	5.56 NATO	14.5 in.	A1	1:7	Yes	A2
N/A	C8FTHB	Canadian 3rd Generation	Short Ribbed	S-1-F	Weaver	Yes	Yes	5.56 NATO	14.5 in.	A2	1:7	Yes	A2
N/A	SFW	Canadian 3rd Generation	Short Ribbed	S-1-F	Weaver	Yes	Yes	5.56 NATO	16 in.	SFW	1:7	Yes	A2
N/A	C8CQB	Canadian 3rd Generation	Short Ribbed	S-1-F	Weaver	Yes	Yes	5.56 NATO	10 in.	A2	1:7	Yes	A2
N/A	PDW	Canadian 3rd Generation	N/A	S-1-F	Weaver	Yes	Yes	5.56 NATO	5.7" in.	A2	1:7	No	A2

=== Non-factory military models ===
Name	Base weapon	Stock	Hand guards	Fire control	Rear sight	Forward assist	Case deflector	Caliber	Barrel length	Barrel profile	Barrel twist	Bayonet Lug	Muzzle device
GUU-5/P	GAU-5/A or GAU-5A/A	2nd or 3rd Generation	Short Ribbed	S-1-F	A1	Yes	No	5.56 NATO	14.5 in.	A1 or M4	1:7	Yes	A1 or A2
GUU-5/P	GAU-5/A or GAU-5A/A	2nd or 3rd Generation	M4	S-1-F	A2 or Flattop	Yes	Yes	5.56 NATO	14.5 in.	M4	1:7	Yes	A2
Mekut'zar	Model 653	3rd Generation or Israeli	Short Ribbed	S-1-F	A1	Yes	No	5.56 NATO	14.5 in.	M4	1:7	Yes	A2
Mekut'zrar	Model 653	2nd Generation or Israeli	Short Ribbed	S-1-F	A1	Yes	No	5.56 NATO	Variable; 9" average	A1	1:12	No	Various

== Colt civilian models ==
Colt's civilian line of semi-automatic Colt AR-15 rifles is identified by a four digit code following a specific prefix. Initially all Colt civilian weapons were listed with an “R” prefix, with this changing to “AR” following the passage of the Federal Assault Weapons Ban in 1994. Colt also produced a line of weapons aimed at target shooters under the “MT” prefix, which stood for Match Target, as well as, the Colt Accurized Rifle, which was the only model to feature the CR prefix. Most recently with the shift in marketing policy by Colt Defense, these weapons have been given the “LE” and "LT" prefix. The "LT" series is modified version of the Colt 6720 featuring a lightweight "pencil" barrel with a free floating rail system. Only 1500 of the "LT" series were produced. Currently, Colt Defense has no line targeted specifically at the private civilian market.

=== R series models ===
Colt model no.	Name	Stock	Hand guards	Fire control	Rear sight	Forward assist	Case deflector	Caliber	Barrel length	Barrel profile	Barrel twist	Bayonet Lug	Muzzle device
R6000	AR-15 Sporter (SP1)	A1	Triangular	S-1	A1	No	No	.223 REM	20 in.	A1	1:12	Yes	Type 2 Duckbill or A1
R6001	AR-15 Sporter Carbine (SP1 Carbine)	2nd Generation	Short Ribbed	S-1	A1	No	No	.223 REM	16 in.	A1	1:12	Yes	A1
R6002	AR-15 Sporter (SP1; Bundled with 3× scope)	A1	Triangular	S-1	A1	No	No	.223 REM	20 in.	A1	1:12	Yes	A1
R6003	AR-15 Sporter Carbine (SP1 Carbine; Bundled with 3× scope)	2nd Generation	Short Ribbed	S-1	A1	No	No	.223 REM	16 in.	A1	1:12	Yes	A1
R6004	AR-15 Sporter (SP1; Bundled with Colt Reflex Sighting System)	A1	Triangular	S-1	A1	No	No	.223 REM	20 in.	A1	1:12	Yes	A1
R6007	AR-15 Sporter (SP1 Coltguard electroless nickel)	A1	Triangular	S-1	A1	No	No	.223 REM	20 in.	A1	1:12	Yes	A1
R6010	AR-15 Sporter (SP1)	A1	Triangular	S-1	A1	No	No	.222 REM	20 in.	A1	1:12	Yes	A1
R6420	AR-15A2 Sporter II Carbine	3rd Generation	Short Ribbed	S-1	A1	Yes	No & Yes	5.56 NATO	16 in.	A1	1:7	Yes	A2
R6430	Sporter Lightweight (9 mm)	A2	Short Ribbed	S-1	A1	No	Removable	9mm NATO	16 in.	A1	1:10	Yes	A1
R6450	AR-15 9 mm Carbine	3rd Generation	Short Ribbed	S-1	A1	No	No & Removable	9mm NATO	16 in.	A1	1:10	Yes	A1
R6500	AR-15A2 Sporter II	A2	Ribbed	S-1	A1	Yes	No & Yes	5.56 NATO	20 in.	A2	1:7	Yes	A2
R6510	AR-15A2 Sporter II (Special export model in .222 Remington)	A2	Ribbed	S-1	A2	Yes	No	.222 REM	20 in.	A2	1:14	Yes	A2
R6520	AR-15A2 Government Carbine	3rd Generation	Short Ribbed	S-1	A2	Yes	Yes	5.56 NATO	16 in.	A1	1:7	Yes	A2
R6521	Colt Carbine (AR-15A2 Government Carbine) (Special export model with receiver block and large pin upper receiver)	3rd Generation	Short Ribbed	S-1	A2	Yes	Yes	5.56 NATO	16 in.	A1	1:7	Yes/No	A2
R6530	Sporter Lightweight .223	3rd Generation	Short Ribbed	S-1	A2	Yes	Yes	5.56 NATO	16 in.	A1	1:7	No	A2
R6550	AR-15A2 Government	A2	Ribbed	S-1	A2	Yes	Yes	5.56 NATO	20 in.	A2	1:7	Yes	A2
R6550CC	AR-15A2 Government (w/ factory camouflage finish)	A2	Ribbed	S-1	A2	Yes	Yes	5.56 NATO	20 in.	A2	1:7	Yes	A2
R6550K	AR-15A2 Government (w/ factory installed .22 Long Rifle conversion kit)	A2	Ribbed	S-1	A2	Yes	Yes	5.56 NATO	20 in.	A2	1:7	Yes	A2
R6551	Sporter Target	A2	Ribbed	S-1	A2	Yes	Yes	5.56 NATO	20 in.	A2	1:7	Yes	A2
R6600	AR-15A2 HBAR	A2	Ribbed	S-1	A2	Yes	Yes	5.56 NATO	20 in.	HBAR	1:7	Yes	A2
R6600DH	AR-15A2 Delta HBAR (bundled w/ Tasco 3–9x scope and cheekpiece)	A2	Ribbed	S-1	A2	Yes	Yes	5.56 NATO	20 in.	HBAR	1:7	Yes	A2
R6600K	AR-15A2 HBAR (w/ factory installed .22 Long Rifle conversion kit)	A2	Ribbed	S-1	A2	Yes	Yes	5.56 NATO	20 in.	HBAR	1:7	No	A2
R6601	Sporter Match HBAR	A2	Ribbed	S-1	A2	Yes	Yes	5.56 NATO	20 in.	HBAR	1:7	No	A2
R6601DH	Sporter Match Delta HBAR (bundled w/ Tasco 3–9x scope and cheekpiece)	A2	Ribbed	S-1	A2	Yes	Yes	5.56 NATO	20 in.	HBAR	1:7	No	A2
R6700	Sporter Competition HBAR	A2	Ribbed	S-1	Flattop	Yes	Yes	.223 REM; 5.56 NATO	20 in.	HBAR	1:9	No	A2
R6700CH	Sporter Competition HBAR (bundled w/ Tasco 3–9x scope and cheekpiece)	A2	Ribbed	S-1	Flattop	Yes	Yes	.223 REM; 5.56 NATO	20 in.	HBAR	1:9	No	A2
R6700S	Sporter Competition HBAR (bundled w/ Tasco 3–9x scope)	A2	Ribbed	S-1	Flattop	Yes	Yes	.223 REM; 5.56 NATO	20 in.	HBAR	1:9	No	A2
R6701	Sporter Competition HBAR (Special limited edition production run)	A2	Ribbed	S-1	Flattop	Yes	Yes	.223 REM; 5.56 NATO	20 in.	HBAR	1:9	No	A2
R6721	AR-15A3 Tactical Carbine	4th Generation	Short Ribbed	S-1	A2	Yes	Yes	.223 REM; 5.56 NATO	16 in.	HBAR	1:9	Yes	A2
R6724	Sporter Competition HBAR	A2	Ribbed	S-1	Flattop	Yes	Yes	.223 REM; 5.56 NATO	24 in.	HBAR	1:9	No	A2
R6731	AR-15A3 Competition HBAR	A2	Short Ribbed	S-1	A2	Yes	Yes	.223 REM; 5.56 NATO	16 in.	HBAR	1:9	No	A2
R6750	Sporter Competition HBAR (bundled w/ bipod)	A2	Ribbed	S-1	A2	Yes	Yes	5.56 NATO	20 in.	Super-Heavy	1:7	No	A2
R6821	Sporter Carbine (7.62×39mm)	3rd Generation	Short Ribbed	S-1	A2	Yes	Yes	7.62×39mm	16 in.	HBAR	1:12	No	A1
R6830	Sporter Lightweight (7.62×39mm)	A2	Short Ribbed	S-1	A2	Yes	Yes	7.62×39mm	16 in.	HBAR	1:12	No	A1

=== AR series models ===
Colt model no.	Name	Stock	Hand guards	Fire control	Rear sight	Forward assist	Case deflector	Caliber	Barrel length	Barrel profile	Barrel twist	Bayonet Lug	Muzzle device
AR6320	AR-15 Lightweight	4th Generation	Short Ribbed	S-1	A1	Yes	Yes	.223 REM; 5.56 NATO	16 in.	A1	1:9	Yes	A2
AR6450	AR-15 9 mm Carbine	3rd Generation	Short Ribbed	S-1	A1	No	Removable	9mm NATO	16 in.	A1	1:10	Yes	A1
AR6520	AR-15A2 Government Carbine	4th Generation	Short Ribbed	S-1	A2	Yes	Yes	5.56 NATO	16 in.	A1	1:7	Yes	A2
AR6520SP	AR-15A2 Government Carbine	4th Generation	Short Ribbed	S-1	A2	Yes	Yes	5.56 NATO	10 in.	A2	1:7	Yes	A2
AR6525	AR-15A2 Government Carbine	4th Generation	Short Ribbed	S-1	A2	Yes	Yes	.223 REM; 5.56 NATO	16 in.	A2	1:9	Yes	A2
AR6530	AR-15; Lightweight	A2	Short Ribbed	S-1	A2	Yes	Yes	.223 REM; 5.56 NATO	16 in.	A1	1:7	Yes	A2
AR6551	AR-15; Target Model	A2	Ribbed	S-1	A2	Yes	Yes	.223 REM; 5.56 NATO	20 in.	A2	1:7	Yes	A2
AR6601	AR-15; Match HBAR	A2	Ribbed	S-1	A2	Yes	Yes	.223 REM; 5.56 NATO	20 in.	HBAR	1:7	Yes	A2
AR6700	AR-15; Competition HBAR	A2	Ribbed	S-1	Flattop	Yes	Yes	.223 REM; 5.56 NATO	20 in.	HBAR	1:9	Yes	A2
AR15A4	AR-15A4 Rifle	A2	Ribbed	S-1	Flattop	Yes	Yes	.223 REM; 5.56 NATO	20 in.	A2	1:7	Yes	A2
AR6720	AR-15A4; Lightweight LE Carbine	4th Generation	Short Ribbed	S-1	Flattop	Yes	Yes	.223 REM; 5.56 NATO	16 in.	A1	1:7	Yes	A2
AR6721	AR-15A3 Tactical Carbine	4th Generation	Short Ribbed	S-1	Flattop	Yes	Yes	.223 REM; 5.56 NATO	16 in.	HBAR	1:9	Yes	A2
AR6721SP	AR-15A3 Tactical Carbine	4th Generation	Short Ribbed	S-1	Flattop	Yes	Yes	.223 REM; 5.56 NATO	10 in.	HBAR	1:9	Yes	A2
AR6951	Colt 9 mm Carbine	4th Generation	Short Ribbed	S-1	Flattop	No	Yes	9mm NATO	16.1 in.	A2	1:10	Yes	A1 Birdcage

=== MT and CR series models ===
Colt model no.	Name	Stock	Hand guards	Fire control	Rear sight	Forward assist	Case deflector	Caliber	Barrel length	Barrel profile	Barrel twist	Bayonet Lug	Muzzle device
CR6724	Colt Accurized Rifle	A2	FF Tube	S-1	Flattop	Yes	Yes	.223 REM; 5.56 NATO	24 in.	Stainless HBAR	1:9	No	None
CR6720	Colt Accurized Rifle	A2	FF Tube	S-1	Flattop	Yes	Yes	.223 REM; 5.56 NATO	20 in.	Stainless HBAR	1:9	No	None
CRM16A1	M16A1 Retro Reissue	A1	Triangular	S-1	A1	Yes	No	5.56 NATO	20 in.	A1	1:12	Yes	Type 2 Duckbill
MT6400	Match Target M4	4th Generation	M4	S-1	Flattop	Yes	Yes	5.56 NATO	16 in.	M4	1:7	No	None
MT6400C	Match Target M4	4th Generation	M4	S-1	Flattop	Yes	Yes	5.56 NATO	16 in.	M4	1:7	No	Factory compensator
MT6430	Match Target Lightweight	A2	Short Ribbed	S-1	A1	No	Yes	9mm Luger	16 in.	A1	1:10	No	None
MT6530	Match Target Lightweight	A2	Short Ribbed	S-1	A2	Yes	Yes	5.56 NATO	16 in.	A1	1:7	No	None
MT6551	Match Target Rifle	A2	Ribbed	S-1	A2	Yes	Yes	5.56 NATO	20 in.	A2	1:7	No	None
MT6601	Match Target HBAR	A2	Ribbed	S-1	A2	Yes	Yes	5.56 NATO	20 in.	HBAR	1:7	No	None
MT6601C	Match Target HBAR	A2	Ribbed	S-1	A2	Yes	Yes	5.56 NATO	20 in.	HBAR	1:7	No	Factory compensator
MT6700	Match Target Competition HBAR	A2	Ribbed	S-1	Flattop	Yes	Yes	.223 REM; 5.56 NATO	20 in.	HBAR	1:9	No	None
MT6700C	Match Target Competition HBAR	A2	Ribbed	S-1	Flattop	Yes	No	.223 REM; 5.56 NATO	20 in.	HBAR	1:9	No	Factory compensator
MT6731	Match Target Competition HBAR II	A2	Short Ribbed	S-1	Flattop	Yes	Yes	.223 REM; 5.56 NATO	16 in.	HBAR	1:9	No	None
MT6830	AR-15A2 Government Carbine (Post-Ban LE Only)	3rd Generation	Short Ribbed	S-1	A2	Yes	Yes	.223 REM	16 in.	HBAR	1:12	Yes	A2

=== LE series models ===
Colt model no.	Name	Stock	Hand guards	Fire control	Rear sight	Forward assist	Case deflector	Caliber	Barrel length	Barrel profile	Barrel twist	Bayonet Lug	Muzzle device
LE1020	Gas Piston Carbine	4th Generation	Rail System	S-1	Flattop	Yes	Yes	5.56 NATO	16 in.	M4	1:7	Yes	A2
LE1033	Gas Piston Commando	4th Generation	Rail System	S-1	Flattop	Yes	Yes	5.56 NATO	11.5 in.	A2	1:7	Yes	A2
LE6920	Law Enforcement Carbine (Also produced under license by Colt Canada)	4th Generation	M4	S-1	Flattop	Yes	Yes	5.56 NATO	16 in.	M4	1:7	Yes	A2
LE6920 SOCOM	Law Enforcement Carbine (US military reproduction)	4th Generation	Knight's Armament RAS	S-1	Matech rear sight	Yes	Yes	5.56 NATO	14.5 in.	SOCOM	1:7	Yes	Extended A2
LE6920HB	Law Enforcement Carbine	4th Generation	M4	S-1	Flattop	Yes	Yes	5.56 NATO	16 in.	M4 HBAR	1:7	Yes	A2
LE6921	M4LE Carbine	4th Generation	M4	S-1	Flattop	Yes	Yes	5.56 NATO	14.5 in.	M4	1:7	Yes	A2
LE6921CQB	M4LE Carbine	4th Generation	M4	S-1	Flattop	Yes	Yes	5.56 NATO	10.5 in.	M4 HBAR	1:7	Yes	A2
LE6921HB	M4LE Carbine	4th Generation	M4	S-1	Flattop	Yes	Yes	5.56 NATO	14.5 in.	M4 HBAR	1:7	Yes	A2
LE6921SP	M4LE Carbine	4th Generation	M4	S-1	Flattop	Yes	Yes	5.56 NATO	10 in.	M4 HBAR	1:7	Yes	A2
LE6933	M4LE Commando	4th Generation	Short Ribbed	S-1	Flattop	Yes	Yes	5.56 NATO	11.5 in.	A2	1:7	Yes	A2
LE6940	Monolithic Advanced Law Enforcement Carbine	4th Generation	Monolithic Rail System	S-1	Flattop	Yes	Yes	5.56 NATO	16 in.	M4	1:7	Yes	A2
LE6941	Law Enforcement Carbine (direct impingement version of LE1020)	4th Generation	Rail System	S-1	Flattop	Yes	Yes	5.56 NATO	16 in.	M4	1:7	Yes	A2

=== LT series models ===
Colt model no.	Name	Stock	Hand guards	Fire control	Rear sight	Forward assist	Case deflector	Caliber	Barrel length	Barrel profile	Barrel twist	Bayonet Lug	Muzzle device
LT6720-R	Talo Special Edition	4th Generation	Rail System	S-1	Flattop	Yes	Yes	5.56 NATO	16 in.	Lightweight pencil barrel	1:7	No	A2

=== CE series models ===
Colt model no.	Name	Stock	Hand guards	Fire control	Rear sight	Forward assist	Case deflector	Caliber	Barrel length	Barrel profile	Barrel twist	Bayonet Lug	Muzzle device
CE1000	Expanse	4th Generation	A2	S-1	Flattop	Yes	Yes	5.56 NATO	16 in.	Lightweight pencil barrel	1:7	No	A2
CE2000	Expanse	4th Generation	A2	S-1	Flattop	Yes	Yes	5.56 NATO	16 in.	Lightweight pencil barrel	1:7	No	A2

== Glossary of terms ==
=== Stock ===
Fixed Stocks

- A1: Fixed stock as used on M16 and M16A1. May or may not have a trapdoor to store a cleaning kit
- A2: Improved stock used on M16A2. Longer by 5/8"
- Tubular: Fixed tubular buttstock, similar to the 2nd Generation retractable unit, using a receiver extension and triangular rear with buttplate

Retractable Stocks

- 1st Generation: 2-position sliding stock that resembled a shortened fixed buttstock
- 2nd Generation: 2-position aluminum retractable stock
- 3rd Generation: 2-position fiberlite retractable stock. Introduced 1985
- Canadian 3rd Generation: 4-position fiberlite retractable stock fitted with rubber buttpad
- 4th Generation: 4-position nylon retractable stock. Introduced 2002, designed by Picatinny Arsenal engineer Lily Ko with reinforced ribs, an angled buttplate, and a rear sling swivel
- Retractable ACR: Similar in design to the so-called "Crane Stock" (initially fabricated by the Naval Surface Warfare Center Crane Division) essentially a 3rd generation unit with integrated cheek-rest
- FPW Wire: Retractable wire stock similar in appearance to the stock used on the M3 submachine gun
- Israeli: Rebuilt 3rd Generation stocks with 6 positions instead of 2

=== Handguards ===
- Triangular: Triangular rifle handguards
- Short Triangular: Carbine length triangular handguards
- Round: Smooth round rifle handguards
- Short Round: Carbine length smooth round handguard
- Ribbed: Ribbed round rifle handguards
- Short Ribbed: Carbine length ribbed handguards
- Square LMG: Special heavy handguards with integral vertical grip for use during sustained fire
- FF Tube: Free-Float Tube
- M4: Oval carbine handguards with double heatshields
- Rail/RIS: Handguards are replaced with a Rail Integration System.
- Monolithic Rail Platform (MRP): A variant Rail System made by LMT. It has a free-floating barrel for greater accuracy.
- ACR Type: Advanced Combat Rifle Project Handguard

=== Fire control ===
- S-1: The selector is Safe (S) – Semi-Automatic (1)
- S-F: The selector is Safe (S) – Fully Automatic (F)
- S-1-F: The selector is Safe (S) – Semi-Automatic (1) – Fully Automatic (F)
- S-1–3: The selector is Safe (S) – Semi-Automatic (1) – 3-Round Burst (3)
- S-F-1–3: The selector is Safe (S) – Fully Automatic (F) – Semi-Automatic (1) – 3-Round Burst (3). First Generation 4 position group
- S-1–3-F: The selector is Safe (S) – Semi-Automatic (1) – 3-Round Burst (3) – Fully Automatic (F). Second Generation 4 position group

=== Rear sight ===
- A1: "Field sights" in which the rear sight is only adjustable for windage
- A2: Rear sight adjustable for both windage and elevation
- Flattop: Indicates carry handle and rear sight has been replaced with a MIL-STD-1913 rail. A detachable carry handle can be attached to the rail which features either A1 (Diemaco/Colt Canada) or A2 (Colt) sights
- Weaver: Indicates carry handle and rear sight has been replaced with a Weaver-type rail. A detachable carry handle can be attached to the rail which features either A1 (Diemaco/Colt Canada) or A2 (Colt) sights

=== Barrel profile ===
- ArmaLite Early ArmaLite AR-15 ultra-lightweight 'Hollywood' turned-down profile barrel, 1:14 twist only
- A1: Also referred to as the "lightweight" or "pencil" profile. Government-specified barrel profile increased to between 0.675 and 0.575 inches
- A2: Also referred to as the "government" or "gov't" profile. Barrel profile for which the portion of the barrel in front of handguards is thickened to 0.715 inches
- HBAR: A barrel that in some portion is thicker than government-profile, usually underneath the handguards
- M4: Government barrel profile with small portion reduced to 0.575 inches to mount M203 grenade launcher
- M4 HBAR: M4 barrel with portion under handguard thickened for sustained automatic fire
- Super Heavy: Special Colt bull target/match barrel
- SFW: Special Forces Weapon profile, A2 profile with "fat" portion forward of the sight triangle

=== Barrel twist ===
Note: Metric measurements are rounded upwards to the nearest digit.

- 1:14: 1 right hand twist every 14 inches (356 mm) .222 Remington or .223 Remington (US M193)
- 1:12: 1 right hand twist every 12 inches (305 mm) .223 Remington (US M193) or 7.62×39mm
- 1:10: 1 right hand twist every 10 inches (254 mm) 9×19mm NATO
- 1:9: 1 right hand twist every 9 inches (229 mm) .223 Remington & 5.56×45mm NATO
- 1:7: 1 right hand twist every 7 inches (178 mm) 5.56×45mm NATO (NATO SS109 & US M855)

=== Muzzle device ===
- Type 1 Duckbill: Original three-prong flash hider
- Type 2 Duckbill: Also referred to as "three prong." A larger three-prong flash hider
- A1 or A1 Birdcage: Also referred to as Birdcage flash hider
- A2 or A2 Compensator: Birdcage flash hider with bottom slots closed off to act as muzzle compensator and to prevent dust from being blown into the shooters face while in the prone position
- 3.5" Moderator or 4.5" Moderator: Either the 3.5-inch or 4.5-inch baffled moderators
- Conical: A conical flash suppressor
- ACR Compensator: Special anti-rise muzzle device developed specifically for the Colt ACR
- Factory Compensator: Colt Factory muzzle brake compliant with the restrictions of the 1994 Federal Assault Weapons Ban

== Bibliography ==
- Bartocci, Christopher R. (2004). Black Rifle II: The M16 into the 21st Century. Cobourg, Canada: Collector Grade Publications. ISBN 0-88935-348-4.
- Dockery, Kevin (1997). Special Warfare Special Weapons. Chicago, IL: Emperor's Press. ISBN 1-883476-00-3.
- Gervasi, Tom (1984). Arsenal of Democracy III: America's War Machine, the Pursuit of Global Dominance. New York: Grove Press. ISBN 0-394-54102-2.
- Long, Duncan (2001). The Complete AR-15/M16 Sourcebook. Boulder, CO: Paladin Press. ISBN 0-87364-687-8.
- Stevens, R. Blake; Edward C. Ezell (2004) [1987]. The Black Rifle: M16 Retrospective. Modern U.S. Military Small Arms (Second Enhanced ed.). Cobourg, Canada: Collector Grade Publications. ISBN 0-88935-115-5.

== See also ==
- M16
- M231 Firing Port Weapon
- M4 Carbine
- CAR-15
- Colt Automatic Rifle
