= Colt Defense =

American firearms manufacturer

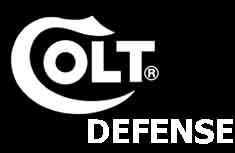

Colt Defense LLC, together with its subsidiaries, is an American designer, developer and manufacturer of small arms weapons systems for individual soldiers and law enforcement personnel. It is headquartered in West Hartford, Connecticut. The company traces its portfolio of products and services back to Colt's Manufacturing Company and prior to that to Colt's Patent Firearms Manufacturing Company.

The company and its predecessors have supplied small arms weapons systems to the United States Government and other governments throughout the world since the Mexican–American War of 1847.

== History ==
In its 2002 reorganization, Colt's Manufacturing Company, Inc. split off Colt Defense to supply military, law enforcement and security markets. Sales to the U.S. Government (including U.S. Government sales to foreign governments) accounted for 57% of net sales in 2010 and 33% of net sales through the first three quarters of 2011, the change being a result of both reduced purchases of the M4 carbine by the U.S. military, and increasing direct sales to foreign government customers.

In 2005, it acquired Canadian arms maker Diemaco.

On October 14, 2010, the company announced that the board of directors had appointed Gerald R. Dinkel as president and chief executive officer of the company, succeeding William M. Keys, who remains on the board of directors as chairman.

In 2013, Colt Defense acquired New Colt Holding Corp., parent company of Colt's Manufacturing Company LLC, forming a single company to develop, manufacture and sell firearms under the Colt name for all markets. On 15 June 2015, Colt Defense filed for bankruptcy, citing both assets and debts in the $100 million to $500 million range.

In January 2016, Colt Defense announced that the bankruptcy court had approved its restructuring plan.

Colt Canada Corporation, its Canadian subsidiary, is the Canadian government's Center of Excellence for small arms and is the Canadian military's sole supplier of the C7 rifle and C8 carbine. Colt Canada began as Diemaco in 1974 and was acquired by Colt in 2005 from Héroux-Devtek. The company and its subsidiaries maintain manufacturing facilities in West Hartford, Connecticut and Kitchener, Ontario.

== Products ==
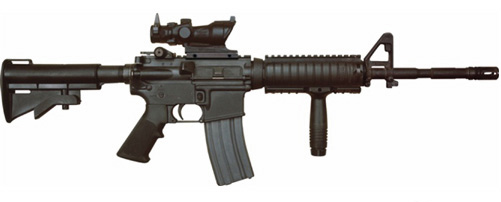
M4 Carbine

Colt was the original producer of the M16 rifle, rights to which it purchased from designer ArmaLite, and today offers a complete "Family of Weapons" based around the derivative M4 Carbine, which includes a heavy barreled rifle (HBAR), a carbine with sliding stock (M4 & ACC-M), a personal defense weapon with folding-collapsible buttstock (SCW), a piston carbine (APC), a Commando M4 with a 10.5 in. (26.7 cm) barrel, an infantry automatic rifle (IARTM), a submachine gun chambered for 9mm ammunition, and the 40mm M203 grenade launcher.

In July 2012, the U.S. Marine Corps awarded Colt a five-year, Indefinite Delivery/Indefinite Quantity contract for up to 12,000 M-45 MEUSOC Close Quarter Battle Pistols (CQBP) based on the current embodiment of the M1911 pistol design.
