= Colt CZ Group =

Czech holding company

Colt CZ Group SE
- Formerly: CZG – Česká zbrojovka Group SE
- Type: Public (SE)
- Traded as: PSE: COLT; Euronext Amsterdam: COLT
- ISIN: CZ0009008942
- Industry: Arms industry
- Founded: 10 January 2013; 13 years ago
- Headquarters: Prague, Czech Republic
- Key people: Jan Drahota (chairman of the supervisory board)
- Products: Firearms; Ammunition; Firearm accessories; Nitrocellulose
- Revenue: CZK 23.398 billion (2025)
- Operating income: CZK 3.262 billion (2025)
- Net income: CZK 2.044 billion (2025)
- Total assets: CZK 55.636 billion (2025)
- Total equity: CZK 21.282 billion (2025)
- Owners: Česká zbrojovka Partners SE (46.9%); CBC Europe (18.8%); Kaprain Chemical (9.9%)
- Number of employees: 3,952 (2025)
- Subsidiaries: Česká zbrojovka Uherský Brod; Colt's Manufacturing Company; Colt Canada; Sellier & Bellot; swissAA; Synthesia Nitrocellulose (51%)
- Website: www.coltczgroup.com

Colt CZ Group SE is a Czech holding company based in Prague. The group owns the firearms manufacturers Česká zbrojovka and Colt and the ammunition maker Sellier & Bellot. The group sells firearms and ammunition to armed forces, police, hunters and sport shooters. Its majority-owned business Synthesia Nitrocellulose makes nitrocellulose for ammunition propellants and industrial uses.

The holding company was established in 2013 as CZG – Česká zbrojovka Group. It acquired Colt in 2021 and changed its name to Colt CZ Group in 2022. Its shares are traded on the Prague Stock Exchange and Euronext Amsterdam.

== History ==
The holding company was incorporated on 10 January 2013. It developed around Česká zbrojovka, the firearms manufacturer based in Uherský Brod. René Holeček became the group’s controlling shareholder in 2014.

CZG – Česká zbrojovka Group listed its shares on the Prague Stock Exchange in June 2020 and launched a public offering in September. Trading in those shares started on 2 October. Weak demand led CZG to sell fewer shares than planned. The offering raised CZK 812 million, which the company intended to put towards its expansion in the United States.

=== Acquisition of Colt ===
In February 2021, CZG announced a deal to buy Colt and Colt Canada through their parent, Colt Holding Company. The sellers were to receive $220 million in cash and CZG shares. Further shares depended on Colt’s earnings over the next three years. CZG completed the purchase that May.

Buying Colt brought CZG customers such as the British and Canadian armed forces. The company also planned to upgrade Colt’s factory in West Hartford, Connecticut.

The holding company changed its name to Colt CZ Group on 12 April 2022, bringing together the names of its two principal firearms brands. In October that year, it acquired the remaining 75% of Spuhr i Dalby, a Swedish manufacturer of optical mounts for firearms in which it had first invested in 2020.

=== Further acquisitions ===
In June 2023, Colt CZ acquired swissAA, a Swiss ammunition group with manufacturing facilities in Switzerland and Hungary. Later that year, it proposed a merger with the American sporting-goods company Vista Outdoor. Vista rejected the proposal, and Colt CZ sold its remaining shares in the company in March 2024.

In December 2023, Colt CZ agreed to acquire the Czech ammunition manufacturer Sellier & Bellot from CBC Europe. The transaction closed in May 2024 for $350 million in cash and newly issued Colt CZ shares. CBC consequently became a shareholder in the group with a 27.71% interest.

The group also acquired the intellectual-property rights to the Mk 47 automatic grenade launcher and its fire-control system from General Dynamics Ordnance and Tactical Systems through Colt in January 2024.

In July 2024, Sellier & Bellot signed an agreement with Ukraine’s Ukroboronservice for an ammunition factory in Ukraine. Česká zbrojovka separately signed a technology-transfer agreement for the production of CZ BREN 2 rifles in the country.

Colt CZ bought Valley Steel Stamp in June 2025. Based in Greenfield, Massachusetts, the company had supplied the group with firearm components for many years.

In January 2026, Colt CZ bought a 51% share in two Kaprain businesses in Pardubice. Synthesia Nitrocellulose makes a raw material for ammunition propellants, while Synthesia Power supplies energy to the industrial site. Kaprain received cash and new Colt CZ shares, becoming the group’s third-largest shareholder with a 9.86% stake.

In April 2026, Colt CZ added a listing on Euronext Amsterdam while keeping its shares listed in Prague.

== Business activities and products ==
=== Firearms and accessories ===
The group’s firearms manufacturers include Česká zbrojovka in the Czech Republic, Colt and Dan Wesson in the United States, and Colt Canada. CZ-USA handles US sales and customer support for Česká zbrojovka. Their customers include armed forces and police, hunters, sport shooters and people buying firearms for personal defence.

Colt Canada, based in Kitchener, Ontario, manufactures and supports small arms for the Canadian Armed Forces and other NATO customers. It also repairs and upgrades weapons and provides training, spare parts and technical documentation.

Spuhr i Dalby in Sweden makes optical mounts and other firearm accessories. The Czech company 4M Systems makes ballistic vests, helmets, uniforms and backpacks. In Michigan, Colt Optics develops sights and targeting equipment.

=== Ammunition ===
Sellier & Bellot makes ammunition for pistols, revolvers, rifles and shotguns at its factory in Vlašim. It supplies military and police customers as well as the hunting and sport-shooting markets. The swissAA group has manufacturing facilities in Switzerland and Hungary, producing ammunition that includes small-calibre cartridges and grenades.

Colt CZ also buys and resells ammunition from other manufacturers. This includes large-calibre ammunition, which the group distinguishes from its own ammunition production in its financial reporting.

=== Nitrocellulose and energy ===
Synthesia Nitrocellulose in Pardubice produces energetic nitrocellulose for manufacturers of ammunition propellants. Its other products include industrial nitrocellulose, used in coatings, inks and adhesives, and oxycellulose for medical use.

Synthesia Power supplies the industrial site in Semtín and Rybitví with electricity, heat and other utilities. It also operates networks distributing water, gas, nitrogen and compressed air. Colt CZ owns 51% of each company.

== See also ==
- Colt Canada - Canadian arm of Colt acquired as Diemaco (founded in 1974) in 2000.
