= Sellier & Bellot =

Czech ammunition manufacturer

- Type: Subsidiary
- Industry: Arms industry
- Founded: August 5, 1825; 201 years ago in Prague, Austrian Empire
- Founders: Louis Sellier; Jean Maria Nicolaus Bellot
- Headquarters: Vlašim, Czech Republic
- Area served: Worldwide
- Products: Ammunition
- Revenue: CZK 8.675 billion (2024)
- Operating income: CZK 1.997 billion (2024)
- Net income: CZK 1.714 billion (2024)
- Total assets: CZK 9.063 billion (2024)
- Total equity: CZK 4.042 billion (2024)
- Number of employees: c. 1,700 (2026)
- Parent: Colt CZ Group
- Website: www.sellier-bellot.cz

Sellier & Bellot is a Czech ammunition manufacturer based in Vlašim. It is a subsidiary of Colt CZ Group. It makes pistol and rifle cartridges, shotgun shells and rimfire ammunition. Its customers include armed forces, police, hunters and sport shooters.

Louis Sellier and Nicolas Bellot founded the business in Prague in 1825, initially making percussion caps. It began producing rimfire and pinfire cartridges in the 1850s, followed by centrefire ammunition and industrial detonators in the following decades.

The company was nationalised in 1945 and it continued producing ammunition. The Brazilian ammunition manufacturer Companhia Brasileira de Cartuchos acquired it in 2009. Colt CZ Group bought it from CBC in May 2024.

== History ==
=== Foundation and early expansion ===
Sellier & Bellot began making percussion caps in 1825. Its founders were Louis Sellier, a French merchant living in Leipzig, and Nicolas Bellot, a French chemist. Production began at the former Zbraslav monastery and moved to the Parukářka estate, now part of Prague’s Žižkov district. Sellier ran the commercial side of the business. Bellot took charge of the factory, designing machinery and improving production methods.

A second factory opened in Schönebeck, Prussia, in 1829. Three years later, Bellot was badly injured in an explosion at the Prague factory. He continued to help run the company and improve its production methods. The factories later began making cartridges and industrial detonators alongside percussion caps.

In 1835, Sellier & Bellot received the title of court supplier. Its Prague and Schönebeck factories together produced about 500,000 percussion caps a day that year, compared with 400,000 at Gévelot, a leading French percussion-cap manufacturer.

After Sellier died in 1870, the business became a joint-stock company in the early 1870s. Bellot’s family remained among its shareholders through his son Alfred and son-in-law Karel Bamberger. The company expanded to Riga, then in the Russian Empire, in the 1880s.

=== Czechoslovakia and the Vlašim factory ===
During the First World War, Sellier & Bellot supplied ammunition to the Austro-Hungarian armed forces. The arms manufacturer based in Steyr bought the company in late 1915. Česká průmyslová banka acquired a majority stake in 1922, four years after the founding of Czechoslovakia.

After the First World War, Sellier & Bellot became the main supplier of ammunition to the Czechoslovak army. Its export markets included Bolivia, Mexico, Estonia and the Soviet Union. Sales to China grew rapidly during the 1930s. The company’s total exports rose in value from about 7 million Czechoslovak crowns in 1934 to 53 million in 1938.

František Blechta, one of the company's directors, developed Astryl, a composition containing mercury fulminate and silver azide for use in industrial detonators. It reduced the cost of making mining detonators and helped the company further expand production.

There was little space to expand the Prague factory, and housing had grown around the site, making ammunition production a safety concern. Work on a new factory in Vlašim began in 1934 and it started production in 1936.

During the German occupation, the factory was ordered to produce ammunition for the German armed forces, including rifle, pistol and aircraft ammunition.

=== State ownership ===
After nationalisation in 1945, Sellier & Bellot became part of Zbrojovka Brno. It became an independent state enterprise in 1949, producing military ammunition for the Czechoslovak armed forces and sporting and hunting ammunition for domestic and overseas customers. During the 1950s, it introduced production of 7.62 × 45 mm, 7.62 × 39 mm and 7.62 × 54 mm R military cartridges. Its activities later included bearings and packaging machinery.

In November 1967, an explosion at the factory, then known as Blanické strojírny, killed eight people and injured 22. Seven people died in the explosion and another during rescue work.

=== Privatisation and restructuring ===
Sellier & Bellot became a joint-stock company in 1992. It was then sold through voucher privatisation, with investment funds and individual investors acquiring its shares.

Financial difficulties led the main shareholders to put Sellier & Bellot up for sale in late 1998. Patria Finance sought a buyer but found none. R.E.M.O. Corporation then bought shares from other investors and gained voting control in 1999. It appointed Radek Musil chairman and chief executive that September.

By October 2000, R.E.M.O. held 76.19 per cent of the shares. Shareholders voted in December to delist Sellier & Bellot, and trading on the Prague Stock Exchange ended on 24 October 2001. In the years that followed, profits improved under new management, which introduced tighter financial controls and performance-related pay.

=== CBC and Colt CZ ownership ===
Wotan Invest sold Sellier & Bellot to the Brazilian ammunition maker Companhia Brasileira de Cartuchos (CBC) in 2009. Neither side disclosed the price. The business kept the Sellier & Bellot name.

Colt CZ Group announced an agreement to acquire Sellier & Bellot from CBC in December 2023. The acquisition was completed on 16 May 2024, with consideration comprising US$350 million in cash and newly issued Colt CZ shares. CBC became a shareholder in Colt CZ as part of the transaction.

In July 2024, Sellier & Bellot signed an agreement with the Ukrainian state company Ukroboronservice for an ammunition-production project in Ukraine. Colt CZ said that it would supply machinery for manufacturing small-calibre ammunition.

== Products and manufacturing ==
Sellier & Bellot manufactures ammunition at its factory in Vlašim. It also makes cartridges for pistols, revolvers and rifles, as well as shotgun shells and rimfire ammunition. Customers include armed forces, police, hunters and sport shooters.

The company designs, builds and maintains much of its own ammunition-making machinery. It also supplies equipment to other manufacturers, including machines for producing bullets and cartridge cases, assembling cartridges, and inspecting and packaging finished ammunition. Its engineering business also makes tools and gauges.

Most of its ammunition is exported, with the EU and the US being its largest markets. Exports account for about 90% of the company’s production, with customers in more than 80 countries.

== Prizes ==
- 1999: Bronze medal in Deutsches Waffen Journal readers' vote in the category of Ammunition.

== Gallery ==
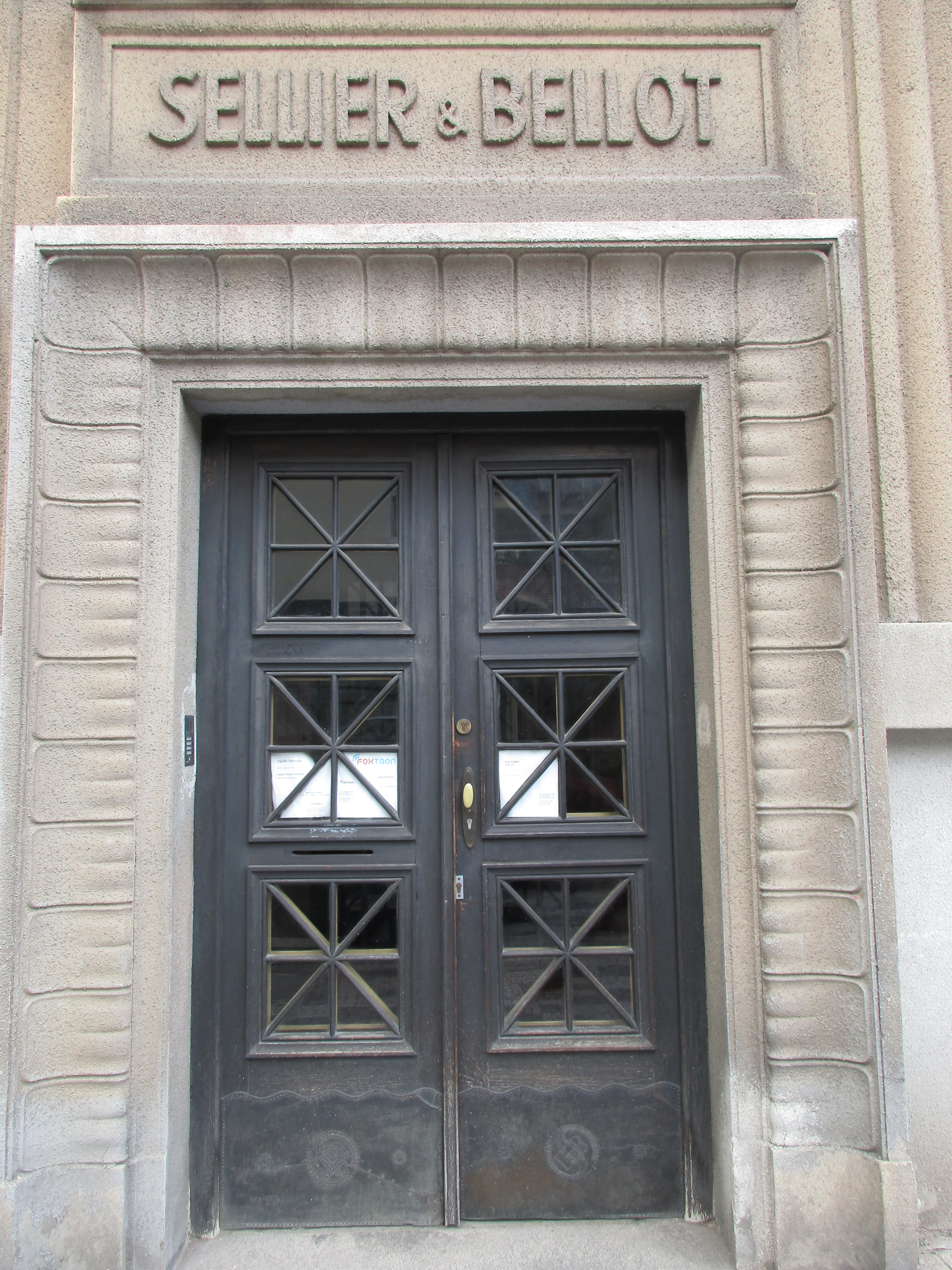
Entrance to the Sellier & Bellot administration, built in 1925.

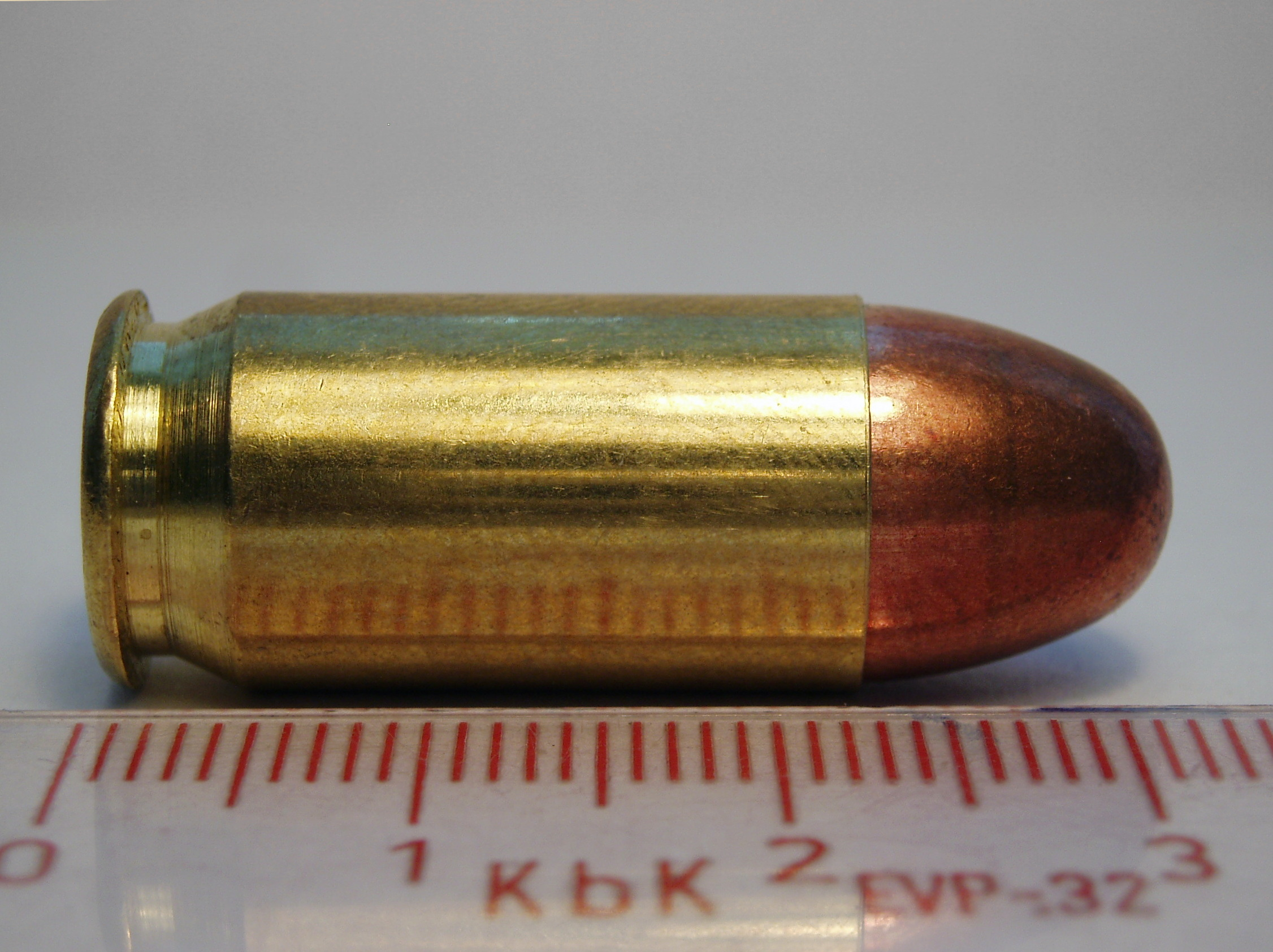
Side on view of Sellier & Bellot .45 ACP FMJ cartridge with ruler for scale.

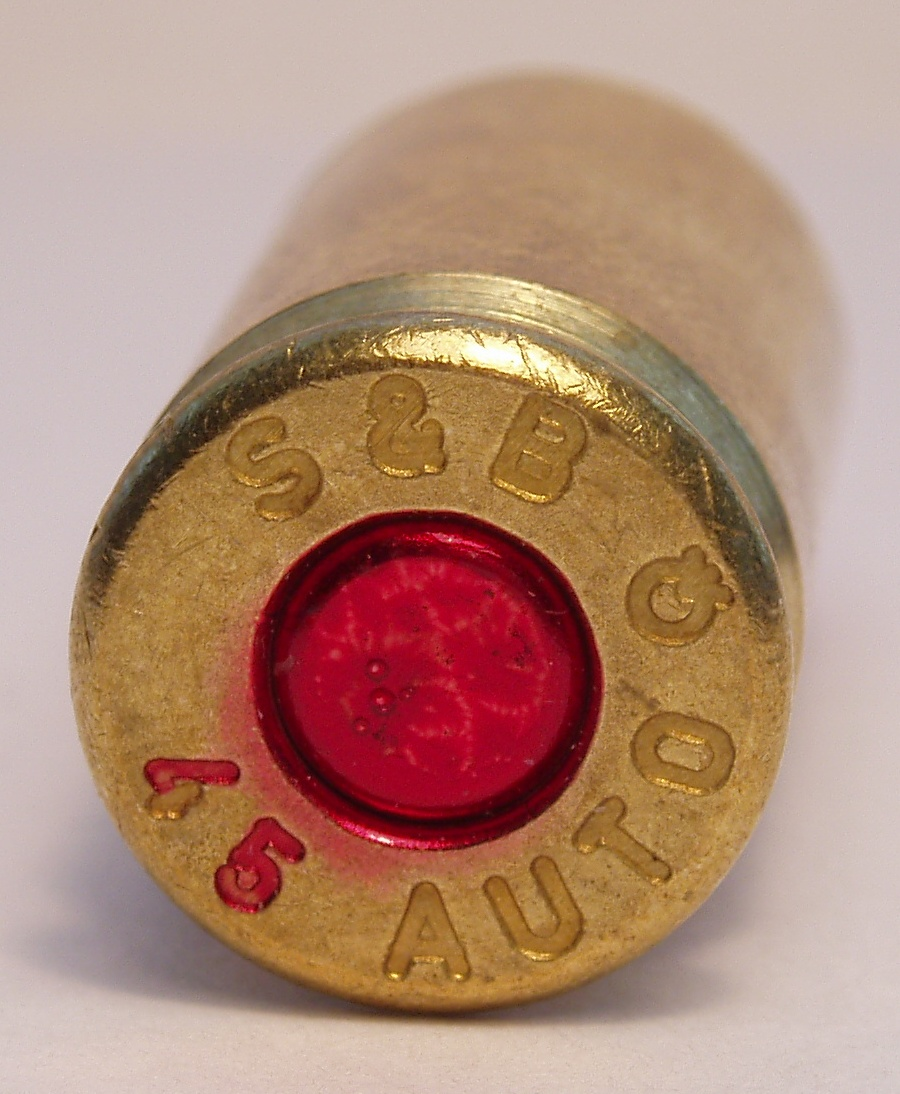
Headstamp on a Sellier & Bellot .45 ACP cartridge.

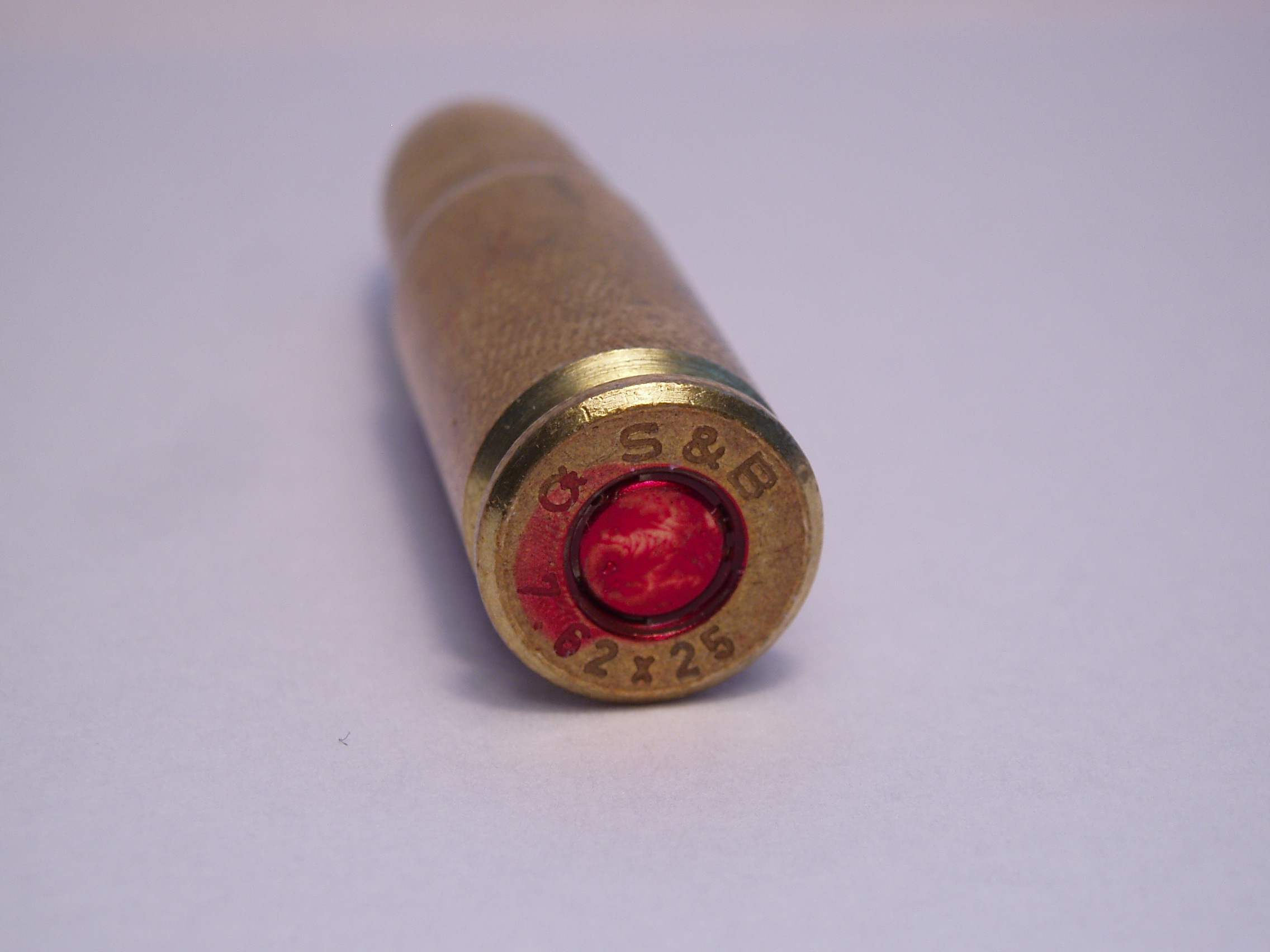
View of the head-stamp on a Sellier & Bellot 7.62 mm Tokarev cartridge.

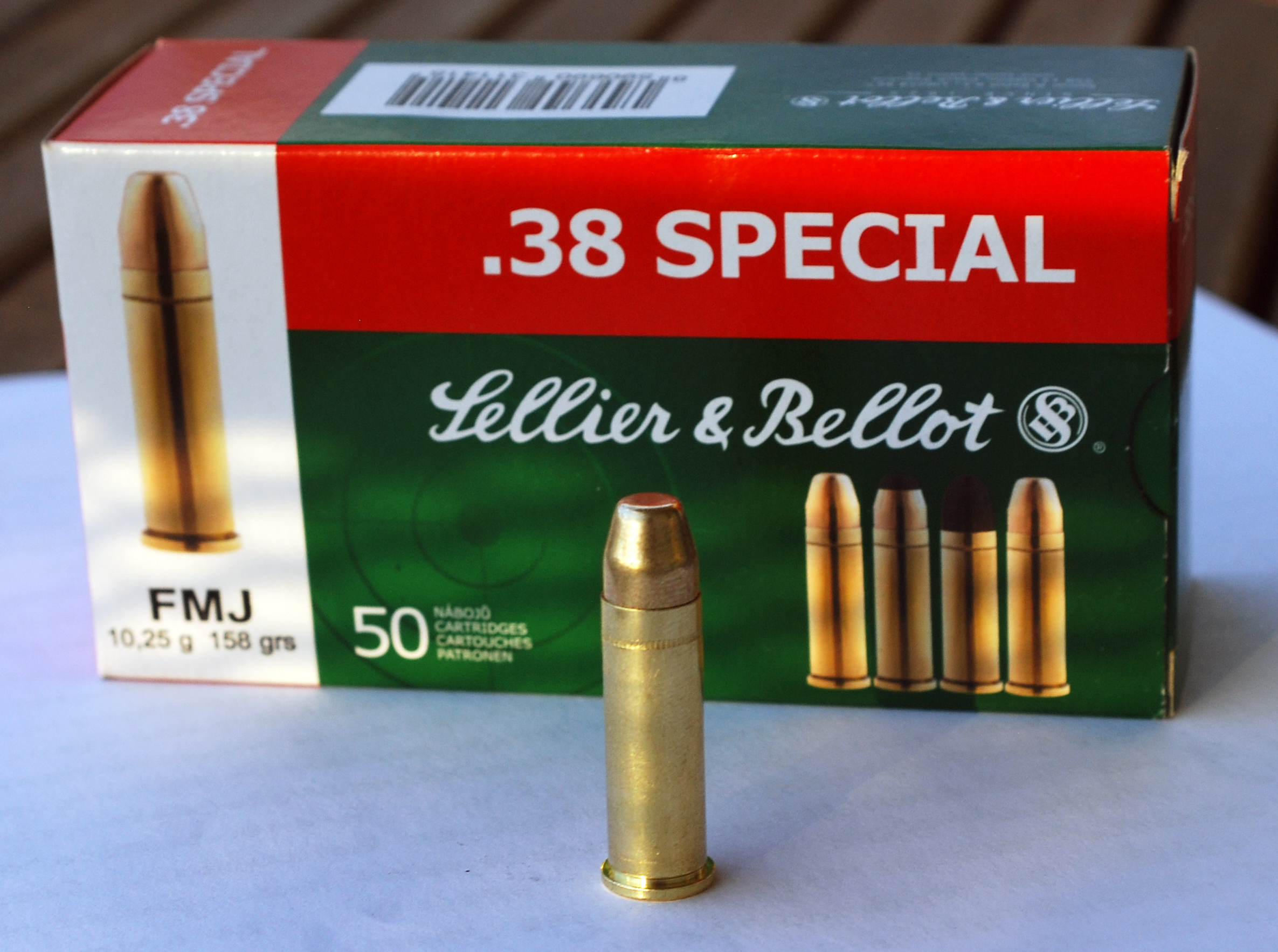
View of Sellier & Bellot .38 special FMJ.

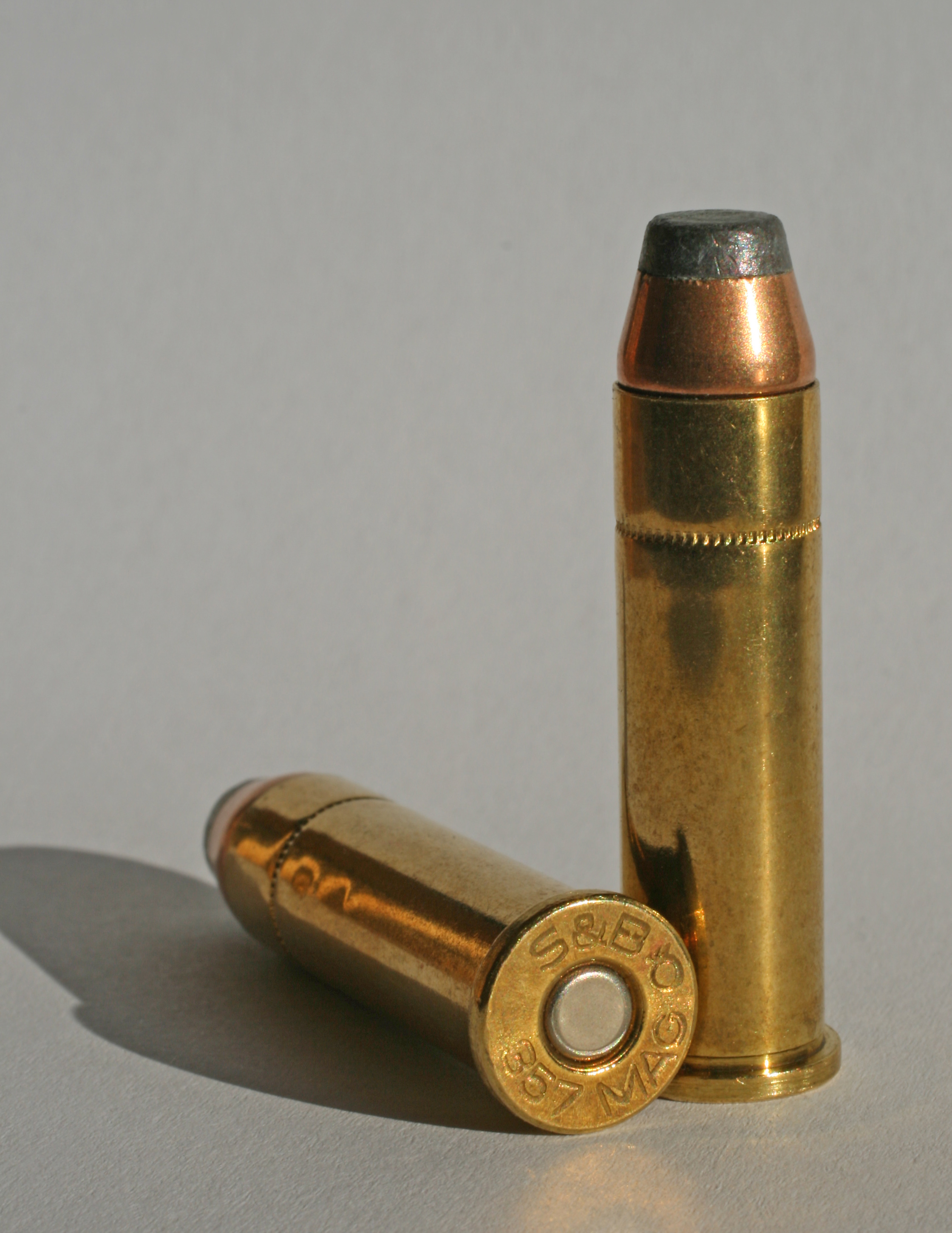
.357 Magnum ammunition made by S&B.

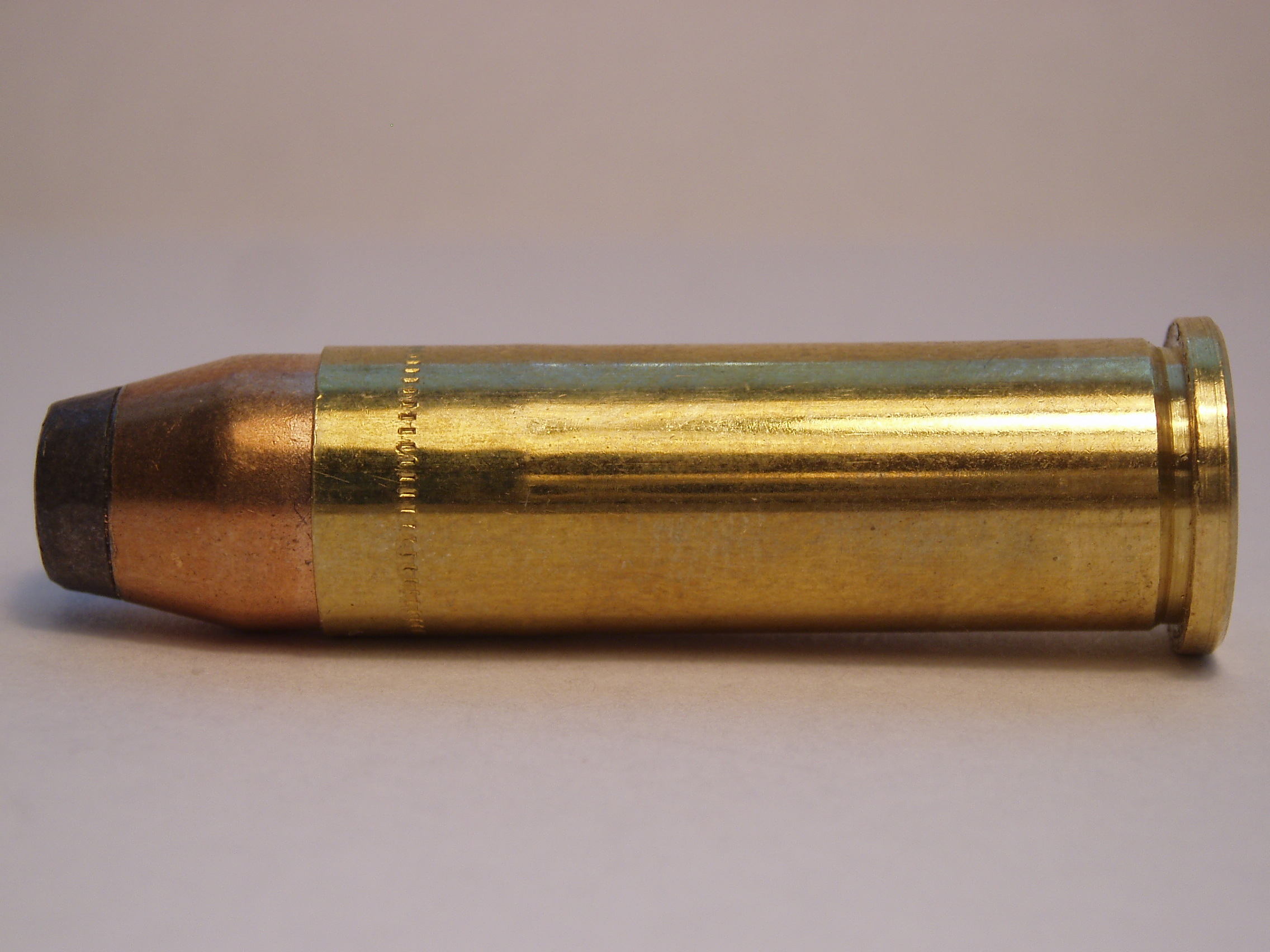
A .38 Special Jacketed Soft Point cartridge made by S&B.
