= Colt 9mm SMG =

Submachine gun manufactured by Colt

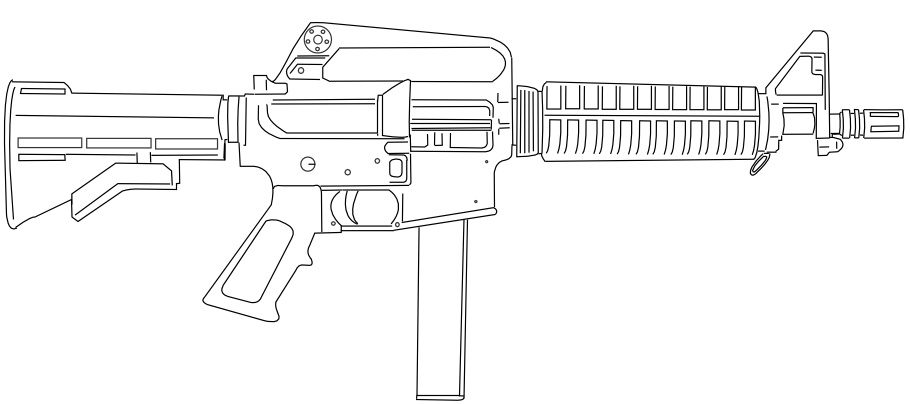
- The Colt 9mm SMG
- Type: Submachine gun
- Place of origin: United States

Service history
- In service: 1982–present
- Used by: See Users
- Wars: Invasion of Panama; Miami drug war

Production history
- Produced: 1982–present

Specifications
- Mass: 2.61 kg (5.75 lb) w/o magazine
- Length: 730 mm (28.9 in ) (stock extended) 650 mm (25.6 in) (stock retracted)
- Barrel length: 10.5 in
- Cartridge: 9×19mm Parabellum
- Action: blowback, closed bolt
- Rate of fire: 700-1000 round/min
- Muzzle velocity: 396 m/s (1300) ft/s)
- Effective firing range: 100 m
- Feed system: 20- and 32-round detachable box magazine 100-round Beta C-Mag

The Colt 9mm SMG, also known as the Colt Model 635 or Colt M635, is a 9×19mm Parabellum submachine gun manufactured by Colt, based on the M16 rifle.

== Design details ==
The Colt 9mm SMG is a closed bolt, blowback operated SMG, rather than the conventional direct impingement gas operation of the standard 5.56×45mm M16 type rifle. As a closed bolt weapon, the Colt SMG is inherently more accurate than open bolt weapons such as the Israeli UZI.

The overall aesthetics are identical to most M16 type rifles. Changes include a large plastic brass deflector protruding from the rear quarter of the ejection port, and a correspondingly shorter dust cover. Factory Colt 9mm SMGs are equipped with a 10.5 inch length barrel and have an M16 style upper receiver, which means they feature a fixed carry handle, no forward assist and A1 sights (with 50 and 100 meter settings). The magazine well of the receiver is modified with pinned-in blocks to allow the use of smaller 9 mm magazines. The magazines themselves are a copy of the UZI magazine, modified to fit the Colt and lock the bolt back after the last shot.

== Variants ==
Current Colt production models are the R0635 (RO635) which features a Safe/Semi/Full Auto selective fire trigger group and the R0639 (RO639) which features a Safe/Semi/3-round Burst selective fire trigger group. Both are equipped with a 10.5 inch length barrel. The 633 was a modified compact version with a 7 inches (180 mm) barrel, hydraulic buffer and simplified front sight post used by the DEA and the Department of Energy.

The most common model is the 635, the latest version of which are simply marked SMG 9mm NATO. Until early 2010s, there are newer variants, R0991(RO991), R0992(RO992) and R6951 are introduced. The R0991 features Safe/Semi/Full Auto selective fire is constructed with Rail Integration System (RIS) picatinny rails on the flat-top receiver as well as around the barrel which allows the easy mounting of ancillary devices, has 10.5" barrel and equipped with a third generation composite buttstock; The R0992 has almost all the same features to the R0991, except the selective fire mode is Safe/Semi/3-round Burst only; The R6951 has almost all the same features of the R0991 and R0992, but doesn't have selective fire and has a 16.1" barrel instead of the 10.5" one.

A suppressed variant known as the "DEA model" exists that uses an integral Knights Armament Company made suppressor covered with an M16A2 handguard.

In 2025, Harrington & Richardson has released their clone of the Colt 633 SMG.

== Users ==
- Argentina: Used by the Argentine Army.
- Ecuador
- India: Used by the Octopus Unit of Andhra Pradesh Police.
- Israel: Used by IDF special forces.
- Malaysia: Used by the Pasukan Khas Udara (PASKAU) Counter-Terrorism Forces of the Royal Malaysian Air Force
- Mexico
- Pakistan
- United States: Used by the United States Marine Corps, (Note: R0991 has an NSN 1005-01-575-5656) United States Marshals Service, Los Angeles Police Department Metro Division SWAT, Federal Bureau of Prisons, Drug Enforcement Administration, Diplomatic Security Service, Department of Energy Federal Protective Forces, and a number of other federal agencies.

== Gallery ==
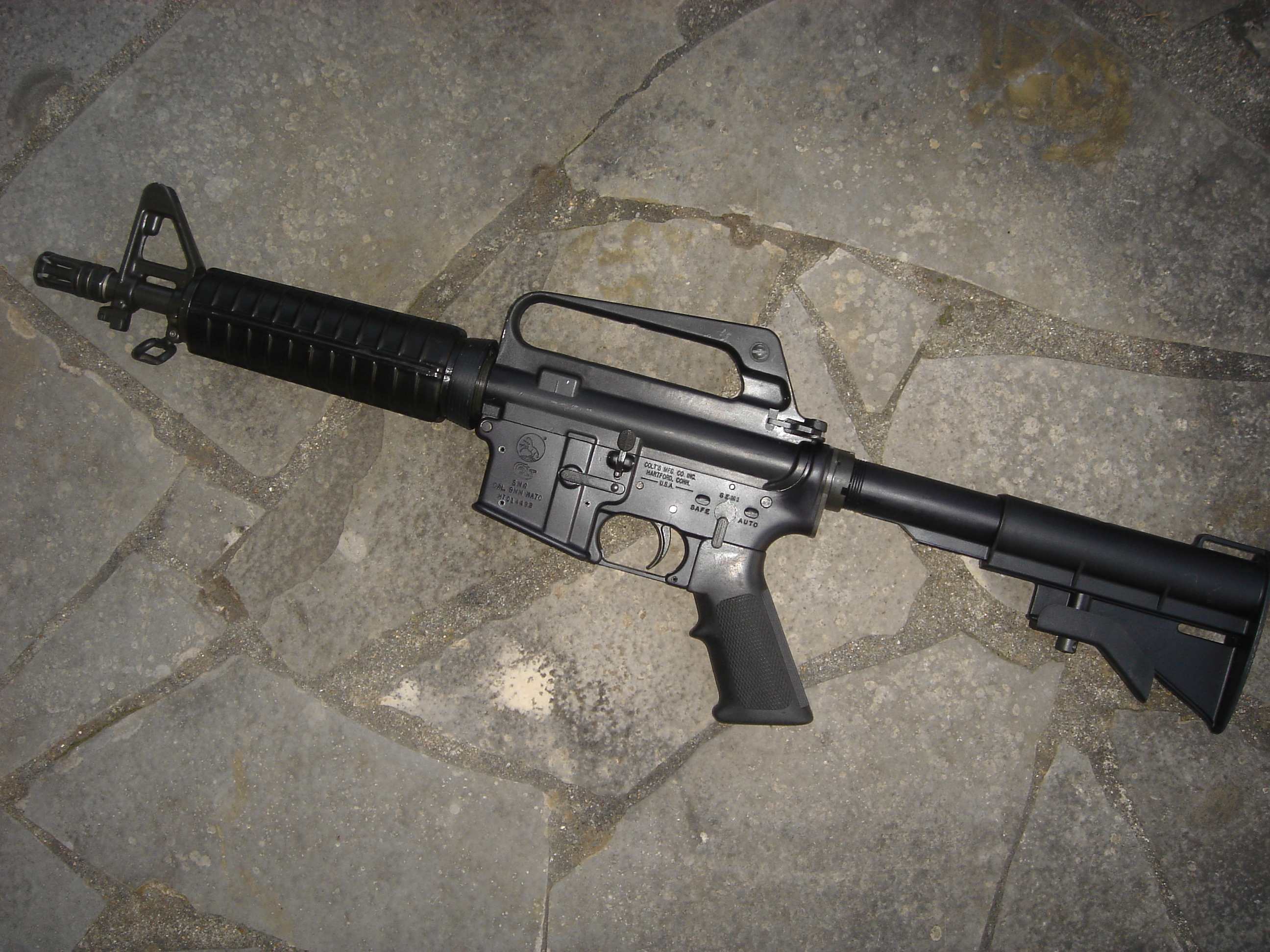
Colt SMG 635 left side

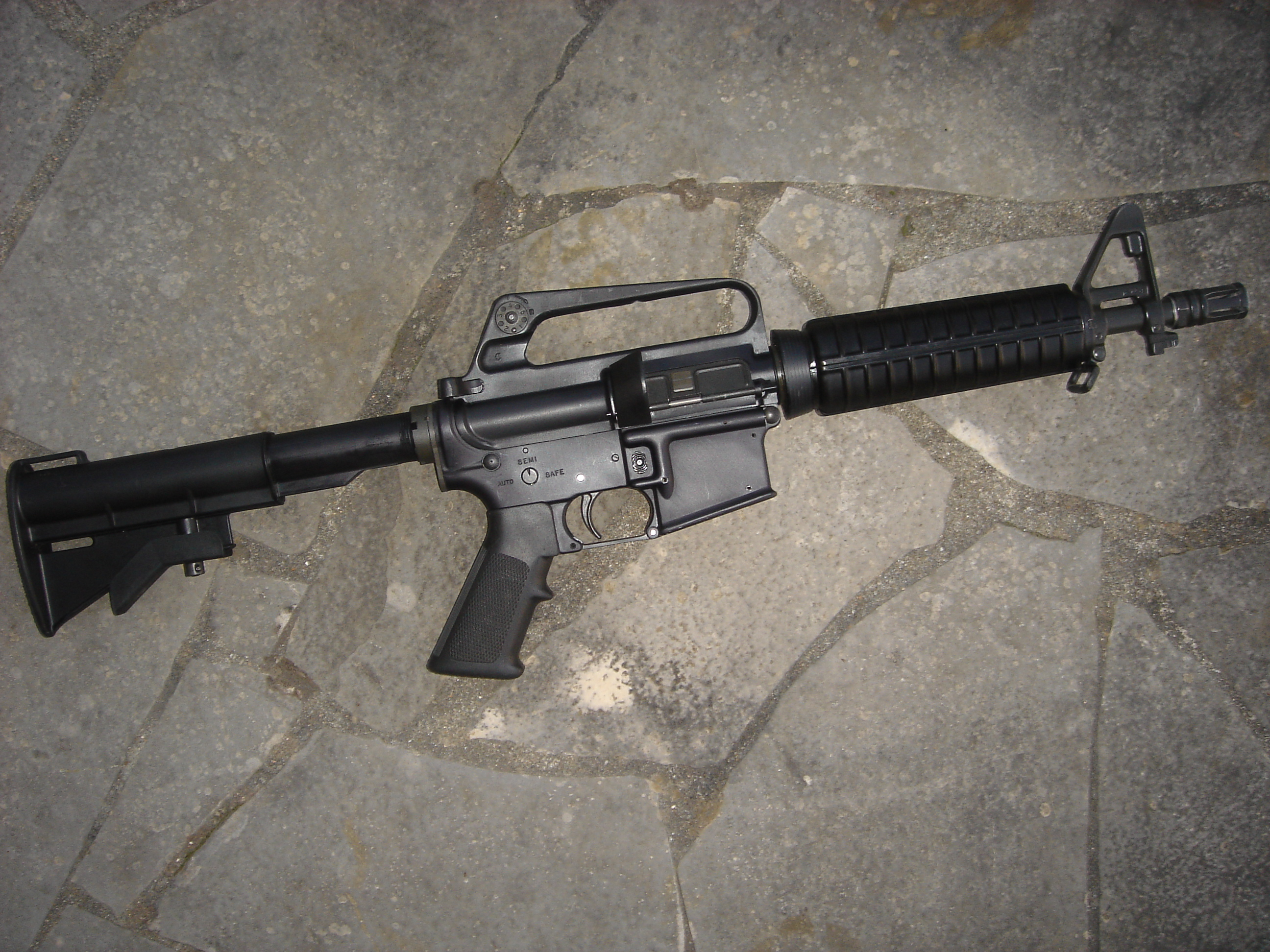
Colt SMG 635 right side

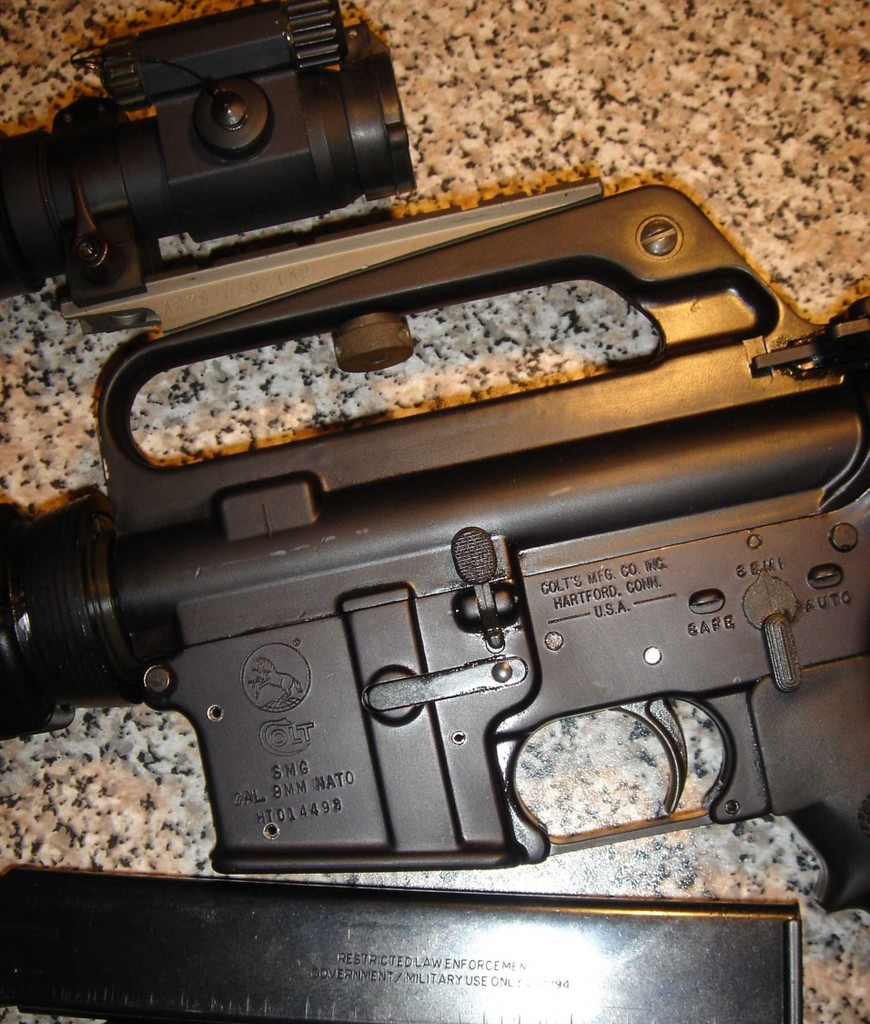
Colt SMG 635, ML 2 Sight, Colt mount, and a magazine

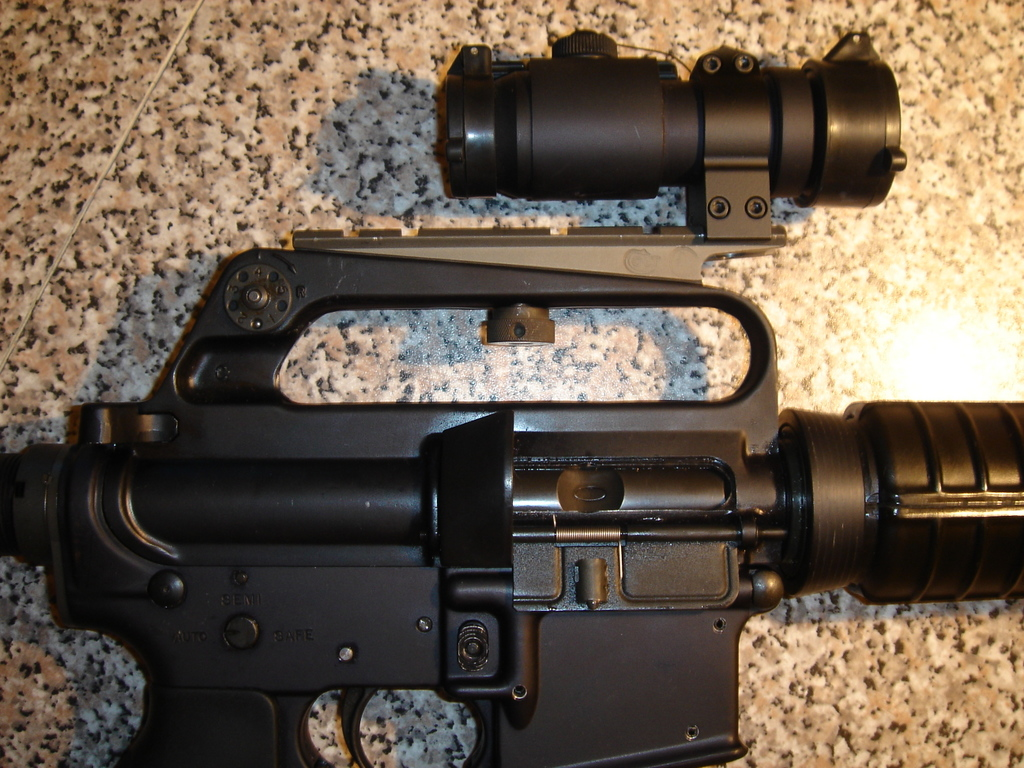
Colt SMG 635, ML 2 Sight, Colt mount

== See also ==
- AUG 9mm – Austrian bullpup assault rifle
- FAMAE SAF – Chilean submachine gun
- Heckler & Koch MP5 – German 9×19mm Parabellum submachine gun
- La France M16K
- PP-19 Bizon – Russian submachine gun
- PP-19-01 Vityaz – Russian submachine gun
- QCW-05
- Sterling SAR-87
- TSB17-9
