= Colt Canada =

Canadian firearms manufacturer

Colt Canada Corporation
- Type: Subsidiary
- Industry: Arms
- Predecessor: Diemaco (1984) Inc., div. of Héroux-Devtek Inc.
- Founded: May 20, 2005
- Headquarters: Kitchener, Ontario, Canada
- Products: Firearms
- Number of employees: 100
- Parent: Colt CZ Group
- Website: www.coltcanada.com

Colt Canada (formerly Diemaco), located in Kitchener, Ontario, Canada, is one of a group of companies owned by Colt CZ Group SE, based in Prague, Czechia.

== History ==
Colt Canada was formed on May 20, 2005, after Colt Defense acquired it from Héroux-Devtek.

== Products ==
The facility produces small arms for the Canadian Armed Forces, Canadian law enforcement agencies In addition, the company exports firearms internationally. International customers include Norway, Denmark and The Netherlands.

The company's main products are the C7 rifle and derivatives which are manufactured under licence from Colt Defence USA, and the EAGLE side-loading 40mm LV grenade launcher. Colt Canada describes itself as the Canadian government's "centre of excellence for small arms" and the Canadian Forces' sole supplier of the C7 family of rifles despite its non-affiliation with the Canadian government.
