= La France M16K =

La France M16k
- Type: Assault rifle Carbine
- Place of origin: United States

Production history
- Designer: Tim La France
- Manufacturer: La France Specialties
- Produced: 1982-2004
- Variants: M16K-45

Specifications
- Mass: 5.25 lb (2.38 kg) (unloaded)
- Length: 23.5 inches (600 mm) with stock collapsed 26.5 inches (670 mm) with stock extended
- Barrel length: 8 1/8 inches (210 mm)
- Cartridge: 5.56×45mm NATO.45 ACP (M16K-45)
- Action: Gas-operated; Blowback (M16K-45)
- Rate of fire: 650 rounds/min 625 rounds/min (M16K-45)
- Feed system: 30-round box magazine 20/30-round M1 Thompson box magazine (M16K-45)
- Sights: Iron sights

The La France M16K is an M16 rifle chambered for the 5.56 mm cartridge, modified by the company La France Specialties.

Its short length and unique sighting system was designed to facilitate firing from moving vehicles. Its extremely compact envelope also makes it an ideal weapon for helicopter crews or special forces. The M16K would take the place of pistols.

== History ==
The M16K was produced by La France beginning in 1982. In the 1990s, an agreement was entered into between La France Specialties and NAIT to distribute La France Specialty products.

== Design ==
The M16K uses the early Colt AR-15 upper receiver, and therefore lacks the forward assist and shell deflector found on A1 and later upper receivers. The rear sight consists of a metal tube welded onto the carrying handle in place of the original adjustable sight, creating a quasi-ghost ring sight. The handguards are shortened versions of the original triangular handguards. M16Ks make use of the stainless steel twin-tube La France gas system, which greatly increases reliability using the short barrel. The lower receiver is a standard M16 select fire unit. The receiver is treated with a molybedenum-disulphide dry-film lubricant to prevent corrosion and rust while providing lubrication to the M16K's parts in extreme temperatures.

Like many automatic and semi-automatic weapons the M16 utilizes pressure from the propellant gases in the barrel to cycle the bolt of the firearm. An adjustable gas system with an expansion chamber and second enclosed tube in order to make the M16K functional. This ensures that the carbine can fire at 600 rounds per minute. The barrel has a vortex flash hider to eliminate muzzle flash.

The M16K originally had a front sight aperture on the carry handle, which was later changed to M-16-style sights with rounded handguards and accessory rail.

=== Accessories ===
The La France/Blair high frequency silencer unit is designed to work with 5.56mm and 7.62mm weapons.

== Variants ==
=== M16K ===
The M16K is a short carbine ("K" standing for the German word Kurz meaning short). The M16K has a 21-centimeter-long barrel and an overall length of 60 centimeters.

=== M16K-45 ===
The later M16K-45 variant was produced using proprietary upper and lower receivers for the .45 ACP round. They use 20 or 30-round M1 Thompson magazines.

== Bibliography ==
- Hogg, Ian V. (1994). Jane's Infantry Weapons, 1994-95. Jane's Information Group. ISBN 978-0710611598.
- Jones, Richard D.; Ness, Leland S., eds. (2010). Jane's Infantry Weapons 2010-2011. Jane's Publishing. ISBN 978-0710629081.
