= Diemaco =

Defunct Canadian defence company

Diemaco (1984) Inc.
- Type: Private (division of Héroux-Devtek Inc.)
- Industry: Defence
- Founded: 1974
- Fate: Acquired
- Successor: Colt Canada Corporation May 24, 2005
- Headquarters: Kitchener, Ontario, Canada
- Products: Firearms, weapons

Diemaco was a Canadian defence company based in Kitchener, Ontario, that manufactured the C7 family of rifles under a licence from Colt.

== History ==
The company was formed in 1974 under Devtek Corporation, effectively replacing the arms supply from government owned Canadian Arsenal Limited.

In 2000, it was acquired by Héroux-Devtek Inc.

On May 20, 2005, it was acquired by Colt Defense for $18.2 million. As a result, Héroux-Devtek revamped the Aerospace and Defense division to the Aerospace division.

Colt Canada relaunched the brand in 2014.
