= Advanced Colt Carbine-Monolithic =

American assault rifle

The Colt's Manufacturing Company Advanced Colt Carbine-Monolithic is an improved version of the M4 carbine presented to the United States military at a conference as a possible replacement for the M16 rifle and M4 carbine within the military.

== Design ==
The Colt ACC-M (Advanced Colt Carbine-Monolithic) adds Colt's proprietary, monolithic Mil-Std-1913 rail system (quad rail) forward hand guard to the normal M4 carbine upper receiver.

Colt M4 Carbines and Colt M4A1 Carbines can be easily and relatively inexpensively modified/upgraded into ACC-Ms by replacing the upper receiver, which is more cost-effective than completely replacing the weapons with a whole new carbine with a different control layout and different overall ergonomics and handling characteristics that require new and different training and maintenance protocols.

New-made ACC-Ms carry the model numbers "R0922" (S-1-3) and "R0923" (S-1-F). There is also a version of the R0923 with an 11.5" (Colt Commando) barrel known as the "R0923CQB."

== See also ==
- Individual Carbine
- M4 carbine
- CAR-15
- M16 rifle
- AR-15
