= Héroux-Devtek =

Canadian aerospace company

Héroux-Devtek Inc.
- Type: Public company (TSX: HRX)
- Industry: Aerospace
- Founded: 1942; 84 years ago
- Founder: Eugène Héroux
- Headquarters: Longueuil, Quebec, Canada
- Area served: Americas and Europe
- Key people: Gilles Labbé, Executive chairman; Martin Brassard, President and CEO; Stéphane Arsenault, Vice president and CFO
- Revenue: CAD$613M ($478M in 2020)
- Number of employees: 1960 (2020)
- Parent: Platinum Equity (2025-present)
- Website: www.herouxdevtek.com

Héroux-Devtek Inc. is a Canadian company specializing in the design, development, manufacture, repair and overhaul of landing gear, actuation systems and components for the aerospace market.

In February 2025, Platinum Equity announced that it had completed its purchase of the company.

== Overview ==
Founded in 1942 and with its main office located in Longueuil, Quebec, it has more than 1960 employees working in 18 facilities in North America and Europe. It recorded sales of $483.9 million for the fiscal year ended March 31, 2019.

The corporation is the third-largest landing gear company worldwide, supplying both the commercial and defence sectors of the Aerospace market with new landing gear systems and components, as well as aftermarket products and services. It also manufactures actuation systems as well as ball screws.

Héroux-Devtek's accomplishments include the manufacturing of the landing gear for the Lunar Module Eagle that landed Neil Armstrong & Buzz Aldrin on the moon for the Apollo 11 mission in 1969.

== History ==
1942 : Founding of Héroux Machine Parts Limited in Longueuil, Quebec.

1960 : Beginning of design and manufacturing operations of landing gear components.

1969 : Manufacturing of the landing gear for the Apollo Lunar Module in 1969.

1985 : Merging of the corporation (On June 26, 1985) with 2320-4894 Québec Inc., a management company incorporated by the corporation's then two senior executives, Gilles Labbé and Sarto Richer, in connection with the sale by Bombardier Inc. of its shares in the corporation.

1986 : Héroux Inc. becomes a publicly traded company.

1987 : McSwain Manufacturing Corporation, a producer of gas turbine components, is acquired by Héroux Inc.

1999 : Métro Machining Corporation and Les Industries C.A.T. Inc. is acquired by Héroux Inc.

2000 : Devtek Corporation is acquired by Héroux Inc. to enhance its landing gear capabilities in the commercial sector. The company changes its name to Héroux‑Devtek Inc.

2004 : Progressive Inc. of Arlington, Texas, a manufacturer of complex military aircraft structural components, is acquired by Héroux-Devtek Inc.

2007-2008 : The company obtained major design contracts to develop landing gear systems for the Learjet-85, Sikorsky CH-53K, and Embraer Legacy 450-500.

2010 : Eagle Tool & Machine Co. and E2 Precision Products of Ohio, manufacturers of precision machined components for the aerospace industry are acquired by Héroux-Devtek Inc.

2012 : Sale of substantially all of its Aerostructure and Industrial Products operations to Precision Castparts Corp.

2013 : Héroux-Devtek Inc. signs a long-term contract with The Boeing Company to supply complete landing gear systems for the Boeing 777 and 777X programs.

2014 : APPH, an integrated provider of landing gear and hydraulic systems and assemblies for original equipment manufacturer and aftermarket applications is acquired by Héroux-Devtek.

2017 : 75th anniversary of Héroux-Devtek.

2018 : Acquisition agreement of Beaver and CESA.

2019 : Gilles Labbé is appointed as Executive Chairman of the Board and Martin Brassard is appointed as president and chief executive officer. Héroux-Devtek acquires Alta-Precision, a Montreal-based manufacturer of high-precision landing-gear components, as well as a majority stake in Tekalia Aeronautik.

== Management ==
Gilles Labbé is the Executive chairman of the board, Martin Brassard is the President and chief executive officer, and Stéphane Arsenault is the Vice president and chief financial officer.

== Production facilities ==
The company's headquarters are situated in Longueuil, Québec, Canada. It also holds production facilities in the greater Montreal area as well as in the US, the UK and Spain.

=== Canada ===
- Longueuil, Quebec (191,400 sq ft [17,780 m^{2}]), manufacturing, repair and overhaul services in the landing gear industry as well as surface treatment and assembly of medium to large size landing gear systems.
- Saint-Hubert, Quebec (28,000 sq ft [2,600 m^{2}]), landing gear drop testing with a capacity of up to 100,000 lbs, complete system testing, fatigue and strength testing.
- Montreal, Quebec
  - Tekalia Aeronautik, surface treatment services
- Laval, Quebec (45,000 sq ft [4,200 m^{2}]), small to medium landing gear systems and components, flight control actuators.
- Kitchener, Ontario (99,000 sq ft [9,200 m^{2}]), machining of medium to large-size landing gear components.
- Cambridge, Ontario (108,000 sq ft [10,000 m^{2}]), machining of B-777 large size landing gear components.
- Toronto, Ontario machining and assembly of complex precision parts, structural components and electrical chassis with integral heat exchangers.

=== United States ===
- Springfield, Ohio (105,000 sq ft [9,800 m^{2}]), manufacturing of medium to large complex landing gear and titanium components.
- Strongsville, Ohio (101,600 sq ft [9,440 m^{2}]), finishing and assembly of landing gear.
- Wichita, Kansas (63,000 sq ft [5,900 m^{2}]), repair and overhaul activities, as well as manufacturing of hydraulic systems and components.
- Everett, Washington (21,400 sq ft [1,990 m^{2}]), final assembly of the B-777 landing gear.
- Livonia, Michigan (Beaver Aerospace & Defence), design and manufacturing of ball screws and actuation systems.

=== United Kingdom ===
- Runcorn, Cheshire (90,000 sq ft [8,400 m^{2}]), manufacturing, repair and overhaul for the landing gear industry.
- Nottingham, Nottinghamshire (48,000 sq ft [4,500 m^{2}]), manufacturing of small to medium landing gear components.

=== Spain ===
- Seville, Seville, assembly and installation of aircraft components at customer assembly lines.
- Getafe, Madrid, design and manufacturing of ball screws and actuation systems.
