= .375 Swiss P =

Rifle cartridge

- Type: Centerfire rifle
- Place of origin: Switzerland

Production history
- Designer: Swiss P
- Designed: c. 2018
- Manufacturer: SwissP Defence
- Produced: 2021–present

Specifications
- Parent case: .500 Jeffery.338 Lapua Magnum
- Case type: Rebated, bottleneck
- Bullet diameter: 9.55 mm (0.376 in)
- Land diameter: 9.30 mm (0.366 in)
- Neck diameter: 10.30 mm (0.406 in)
- Shoulder diameter: 14.80 mm (0.583 in)
- Base diameter: 15.73 mm (0.619 in)
- Rim diameter: 14.93 mm (0.588 in)
- Rim thickness: 1.52 mm (0.060 in)
- Case length: 69.85 mm (2.750 in)
- Overall length: 93.50 mm (3.681 in)
- Rifling twist: 304.80 (1 in 12")
- Maximum pressure (CIP): 420.00 MPa (60,916 psi)

Ballistic performance
Bullet mass/type	Velocity	Energy
350 gr (23 g) FMJ	865 m/s (2,840 ft/s)	8,492 J (6,263 ft⋅lbf)
- Test barrel length: 762 mm (30 in)

The .375 Swiss P or 9.5×70mmRB, designated 375 Swiss P by the C.I.P., is a rebated rim, bottleneck, centerfire rifle cartridge. It was developed during the late 2010s as a high-powered, long-range cartridge for military snipers and the law enforcement sector. The loaded cartridge is 14.93 mm (0.588 in) in diameter (rim) and 93.5 mm (3.68 in) long. It can penetrate better-than-standard military body armor and has a maximum supersonic range of about 1,600 metres (1,750 yd) with C.I.P. conform FMJ factory ammunition at sea level conditions. Muzzle velocity is dependent on barrel length, seating depth, and powder charge, and varies from 860 to 870 m/s (2,800 to 2,900 ft/s) for commercial loads with 22.7-gram (350 gr) bullets, which corresponds to about 8,500 J (6,300 ft⋅lbf) of muzzle energy.

== Background ==
The .375 Swiss P is advertised by RUAG Ammotec as a cartridge that "fills the gap in ballistic performance between the .338 Lapua Magnum (8.6×70mm) and the .50 Browning Machine Gun (12.7×99mm)". Especially in regard to down-range kinetic energy, this performance gap is significant. As such it was designed to be relatively easily (re)chambered by just a rebarreling as a performance upgrade in sturdily built rifles originally designed around the .338 Lapua Magnum that also are encountered in .338 Norma Magnum and .300 Norma Magnum chamberings.

The .375 Swiss P shares its bolt face, rim diameter and overall length and maximum operating pressure with the .338 Lapua Magnum chambering. It features a larger 15.73 mm (0.619 in) base diameter as found in the .500 Jeffery. This results in a (P1 - R1 = 0.80 mm (0.031 in)) rebated rim. Rebated rim cartridges have a rim that is significantly smaller in diameter than the base of the case, serving only for extraction. Functionally the same as a rimless case, a rebated rim allows a gun to be easily converted to fire a larger-than-normal case capacity cartridge, as most of a gun's action (loading/extraction mechanism) does not need to be altered as long as the rim size is preserved.

Currently, the PGM Mini Hecate II, Voere with the X3, X4 and X5 and Unique Alpine with the TPG-3A4 (FN Ballista) offer the new chambering, and the TTS Xceed is also to be available in .375 Swiss P. At its introduction in 2021 .375 Swiss P ammunition is only available for military/law enforcement users.

== Performance ==
RUAG Ammotec claims that the .375 Swiss P FMJ low drag projectile load offers performance superior to their .338 Lapua Magnum offerings, exhibiting additional supersonic range and reduced wind drift, while delivering greater kinetic energy down range. The manufacturer states .375 Swiss P ball is loaded with a double base smokeless powder and the projectile has a 0.8014 (ICAO) G1 ballistic coefficient under International Standard Atmosphere sea level conditions (air density ρ = 1.225 kg/m^{3}). With an AP-type projectile the .375 Swiss P is claimed to be able to penetrate the body armour of German Protection Level IV from a distance at ranges up to 600 metres (660 yd). However, as of May 2021 .375 Swiss P AP loads are not commercially available.

== See also ==
- 9 mm caliber
- List of rebated rim cartridges
- List of rifle cartridges
