= .338 Norma Magnum =

Rimless rifle cartridge

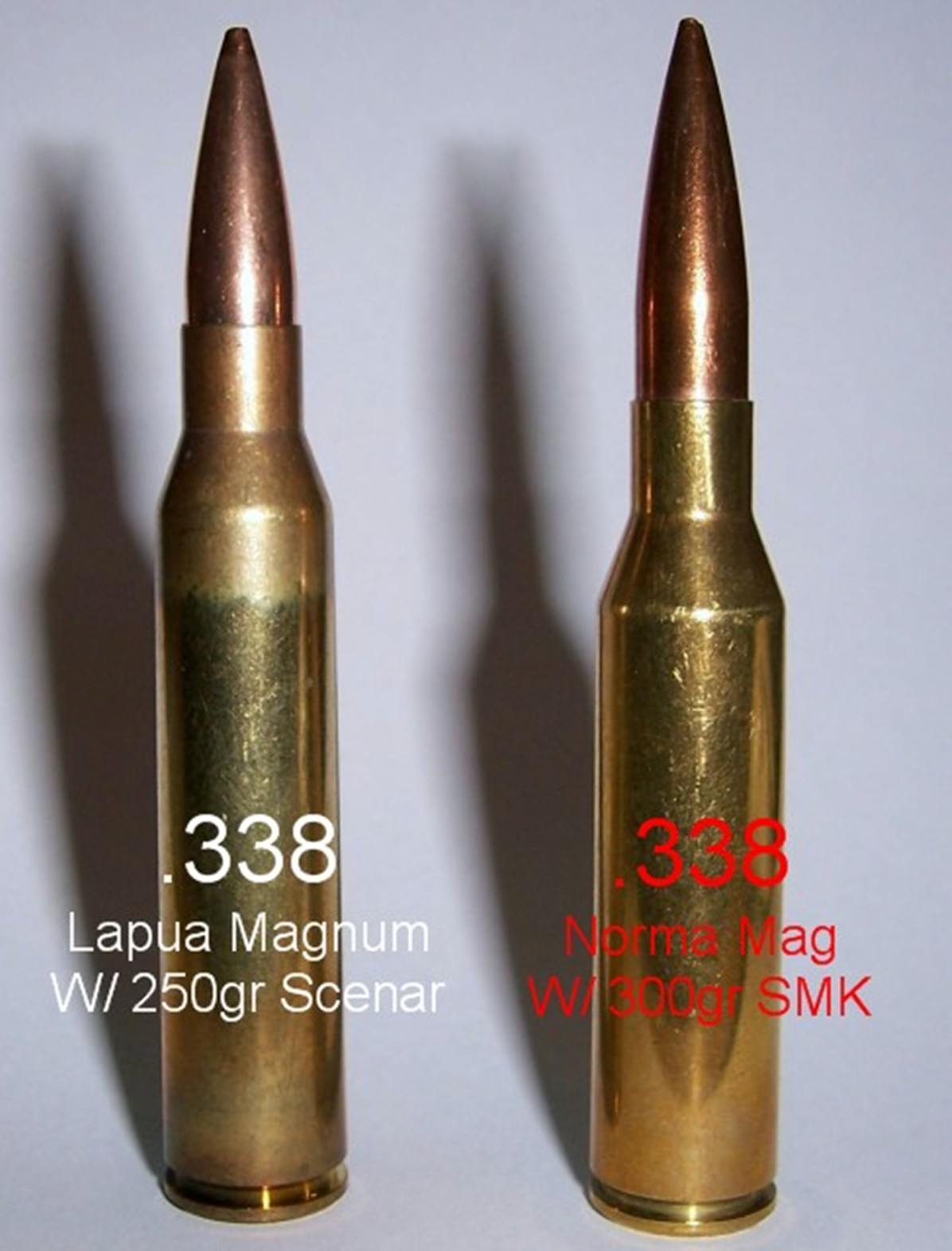
- Side by side comparison of the .338 Lapua Magnum cartridge to the .338 Norma Magnum cartridge.
- Type: Rifle
- Place of origin: Sweden; United States

Production history
- Designer: Jimmy Sloan, Norma
- Manufacturer: Norma
- Produced: 2009

Specifications
- Parent case: .416 Rigby
- Case type: Rimless, bottleneck
- Bullet diameter: 8.60 mm (0.339 in)
- Neck diameter: 9.40 mm (0.370 in)
- Shoulder diameter: 14.50 mm (0.571 in)
- Base diameter: 14.87 mm (0.585 in)
- Rim diameter: 14.93 mm (0.588 in)
- Rim thickness: 1.52 mm (0.060 in)
- Case length: 63.30 mm (2.492 in)
- Overall length: 93.50 mm (3.681 in)
- Case capacity: 6.95 cm^{3} (107.3 gr H_{2}O)
- Rifling twist: 235 mm (1 in 9.25 in)
- Primer type: Large rifle magnum
- Maximum pressure: 440.00 MPa (63,817 psi)

Ballistic performance
| Bullet mass/type | Velocity | Energy |
|---|---|---|
| 19.44 g (300 gr) Sierra MatchKing | 823 m/s (2,700 ft/s) | 6,585 J (4,857 ft⋅lbf) |
- Test barrel length: 610 mm (24 inches)

The .338 Norma Magnum is a rifle cartridge designed by Norma of Sweden. It was first introduced in 2008 and came into production in 2009. It is primarily intended for long-range precision shooting, though some machine guns are also chambered for this cartridge.

== Design history ==
The .338 Norma Magnum was originally developed as a long-range sport-shooting wildcat cartridge by the American sport shooter Jimmie Sloan, with the help of Dave Kiff, owner of Pacific Tool and Gauge, who made the reamers and headspace gauges. Rock Creek Barrel, Inc. supplied barrels. Various twist rates were tried with 5R rifling. It was designed as a way to optimize shooting the 19.44 grams (300.0 grains) 8.59 millimetres (0.338 in) caliber Sierra HPBT MatchKing projectile from actions and magazines that lack the length to handle cartridges exceeding 91.44 mm (3.600 in) in overall length. The Sierra HPBT MatchKing projectile was not available during the introduction of the .338 Lapua Magnum, which is generally optimised for and loaded with shorter 16.2 g (250 gr) to 18.47 g (285 gr) projectiles. The reduced case capacity in the .338 Norma Magnum compared to the .338 Lapua Magnum results in a lower muzzle velocity, but that is made up for by the increased ballistic coefficient of the heavier-for-caliber bullet, making the .338 Norma Magnum a more efficient cartridge.

This design was then purchased by the Swedish ammunition manufacturer Norma, and became C.I.P. certified on 26 May 2010, becoming an officially registered and sanctioned rifle cartridge.

== Cartridge dimensions ==
The .338 Norma Magnum before C.I.P. certification had a shorter cartridge overall length (91.44 mm (3.60 in) compared to the cartridge overall length of the .338 Lapua Magnum (93.50 mm (3.681 in). The .338 Norma Magnum loaded with 19.44 g (300 gr) .338-caliber Sierra HPBT projectiles will have these projectiles less deeply seated than in the .338 Lapua Magnum when both cartridges are loaded to 91.44 mm (3.681 in) overall length. To achieve this, the .338 Norma Magnum cartridge utilizes a shorter case (about 63.30 mm (2.492 in)), with less taper and a slightly sharper shoulder angle, and a slightly longer neck, resulting in about 6.5% less case capacity. However, the overall cartridge lengths of the .338 Norma Magnum and .338 Lapua Magnum were, as of 2013, determined by the C.I.P. to be 93.50 mm (3.681 in).

== U.S. government market survey and ammunition availability ==
On 17 June 2008, the U.S. government issued a market survey to support a requirement for a Precision Sniper Rifle (PSR) to possibly replace the currently fielded Bolt Action SOF Sniper Systems Mk 13 (.300 Winchester Magnum) and the M40 and M24 (7.62×51mm NATO) chambered to safely fire factory produced "non-wildcat" .338 caliber ammunition.

The .338 Norma Magnum was designed to improve upon the .338 Lapua Magnum when loaded with 19.44 g (300 gr) Sierra very-low-drag bullets in magazines and actions that restrict the .338 Lapua Magnum's maximum cartridge overall length.

In long-range precision sport shooting rifles, which the .338 Norma Magnum cartridge was designed for, the chamber and throat of the barrel are often custom-made by a gunsmith for a particular cartridge, meaning the rifle (system) is consciously constructed for optimal use with a particular cartridge case and projectile combination. If projectiles of differing dimensions are to be used, this will generally erode the accuracy potential of such a custom-made system. This makes objective comparisons between cartridges hard, since cartridges are essential parts of a larger rifle system.

Since the .338 Lapua Magnum can be loaded to its C.I.P. overall length or even somewhat longer, the practical difference between the two cartridges gradually becomes negligible. Some manufacturers of .338 Lapua Magnum actions, magazines and rifles have indicated that they intend to offer products that will allow the use of .338 Lapua Magnum cartridges that can handle overall lengths that exceed the current C.I.P. .338 Lapua Magnum maximal overall length standard of 93.50 mm (3.681 in).

In May 2017 the United States Special Operations Command, in conjunction with the United States Marine Corps issued a sources sought notice for 5,000 Lightweight Medium Machine Guns (LWMMG) chambered for .338 Norma Magnum polymer-cased ammunition. The aim is to identify a machine gun with a 24 inches (610 mm) long barrel weighing 24 pounds (10.9 kg) or less, which offers sufficient accuracy out to 2,000 metres (2,187 yd) to engage area targets and vehicles.

In 2019 the U.S. Special Operations Command awarded Barrett Firearms Manufacturing a $50,000,000 contract, ordering the Barrett MRAD, designated Mk 22 Advanced Sniper Rifle (ASR), chambered in .338 Norma Magnum (designated XM1162) as well as 7.62×51mm NATO and .300 Norma Magnum.

In 2020, the U.S. Special Operations Command awarded SIG Sauer a contract, ordering the MG 338 machine gun chambered in .338 Norma Magnum.

== Chambering availability ==
The .338 Norma Magnum chambering is offered for these factory rifles:

=== Bolt action rifles ===
- Accuracy International ASR
- Barrett MRAD (Mk 22 ASR) (Note: This is a switch chambering and barrel sniper rifle that can also fire .300 Norma Magnum, .300 PRC, and 6.5 Creedmoor cartridges.)
- Cadex Defence CDX-33
- Desert Tech SRS-A2
- FORTMEIER M 2002
- Remington Modular Sniper Rifle (MSR)
- Sako TRG M10 - Multi-caliber rifle

=== Selective fire ===
- General Dynamics Lightweight Medium Machine Gun (LWMMG)
- SIG Sauer MMG 338 SLMAG - belt-fed medium machine gun, which is highly analogous to the LWMMG
- Ohio Ordnance Works Recoil Enhanced Automatic Precision Rifle (REAPR)

=== Semi-automatic rifles ===
- Albert Arms ALR
- S.W.O.R.D. International Mk-18 Mod 1 Mjölnir

== See also ==
- Norma
- .300 Norma Magnum
- .338 Lapua Magnum
- .338 Remington Ultra Magnum
- .338-378 Weatherby Magnum
- .338 Edge
- .338 Xtreme
- .338 Winchester Magnum
- List of rifle cartridges
- 8 mm caliber
