= .505 Gibbs =

Rifle cartridge

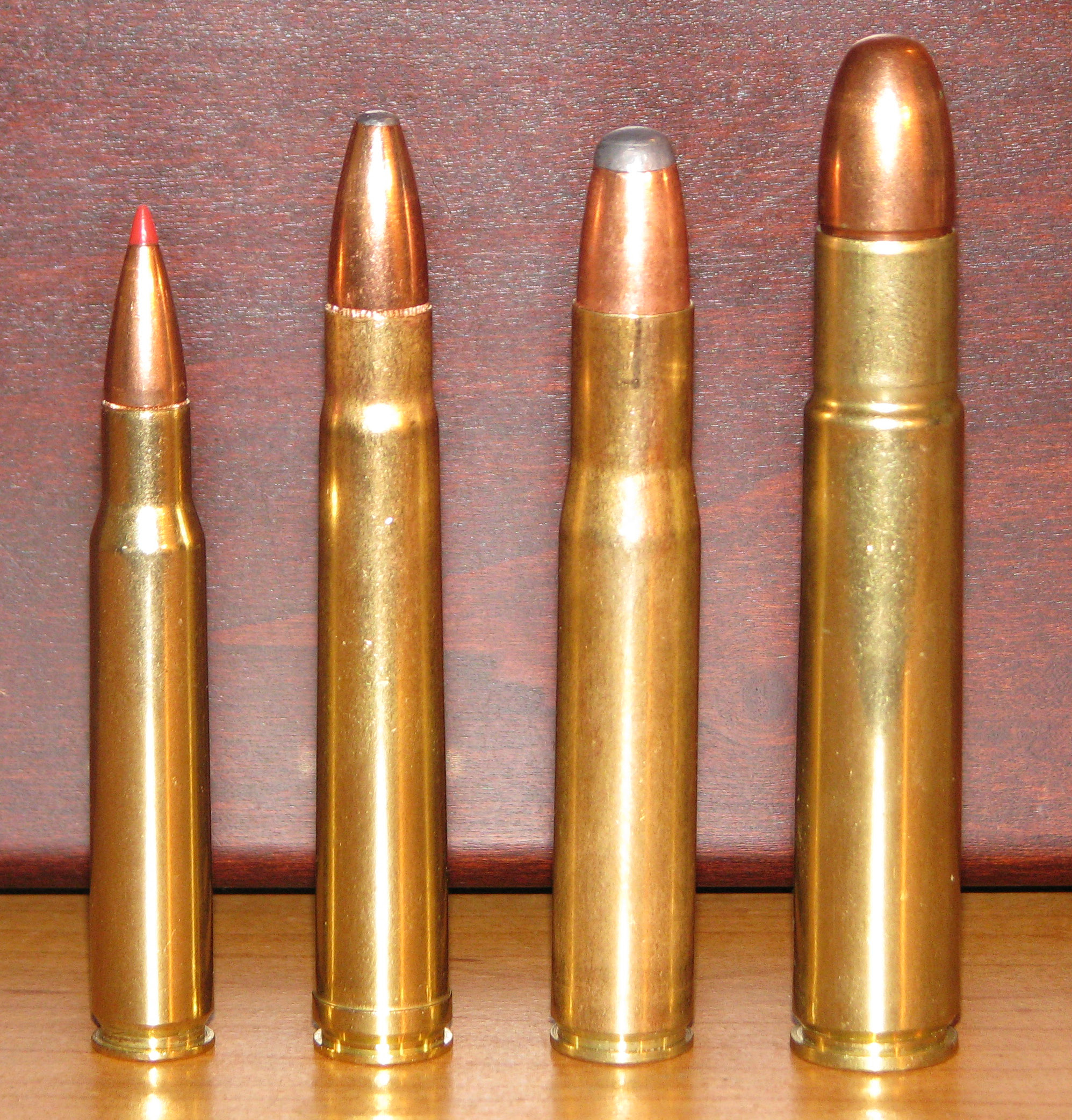
- L-R: .30-06 Springfield, .375 H&H, .404 Jeffery, .505 Gibbs
- Type: Rifle
- Place of origin: England

Production history
- Designer: George Gibbs
- Designed: 1910
- Manufacturer: Gibbs
- Produced: 1911–present

Specifications
- Case type: Rimless, bottleneck
- Bullet diameter: .505 in (12.8 mm)
- Land diameter: .494 in (12.5 mm)
- Neck diameter: .535 in (13.6 mm)
- Shoulder diameter: .600 in (15.2 mm)
- Base diameter: .640 in (16.3 mm)
- Rim diameter: .640 in (16.3 mm)
- Rim thickness: .065 in (1.7 mm)
- Case length: 3.150 in (80.0 mm)
- Overall length: 3.850 in (97.8 mm)
- Case capacity: 178 gr H_{2}O (11.5 cm^{3})
- Rifling twist: 1 in 16 (406 mm)
- Primer type: magnum large rifle
- Maximum pressure: 39,000 psi (270 MPa)

Ballistic performance
| Bullet mass/type | Velocity | Energy |
|---|---|---|
| 540 gr (35 g) Norma solid | 2,300 ft/s (700 m/s) | 6,345 ft⋅lbf (8,603 J) |
| 600 gr (39 g) Woodleigh FMJ | 2,100 ft/s (640 m/s) | 5,877 ft⋅lbf (7,968 J) |
| 600 gr (39 g) Woodleigh soft point | 2,100 ft/s (640 m/s) | 5,877 ft⋅lbf (7,968 J) |
- Test barrel length: 24 inches (610 mm); Source: Norma

The .505 Gibbs cartridge was designed by George Gibbs in 1911. The cartridge was originally known as the .505 Rimless Nitro Express. The C.I.P. refers to the cartridge as the 505 Mag. Gibbs in their publications. It is a .50 caliber (12.8 mm) rimless bottlenecked cartridge intended for magazine-fed rifles.

== General information ==
The .505 Gibbs has a case capacity of 178 grains (11.5 g) of water. This cartridge was originally loaded with 90-grain (5.8 g) of cordite and 525-grain (34.0 g) bullet at 2,300 ft/s (700 m/s) for 6,166 ft⋅lbf (8,360 J) of kinetic energy. While the .505 Gibbs has a greater case capacity than most modern cartridges, it is loaded to lower pressures. The C.I.P. recommends a pressure of 2,700 bar (39,000 psi) for the cartridge. As .505 Gibbs was intended for hunting dangerous game in tropical environments, and due to the temperature sensitivity of cordite, the lower pressures provide a greater safety and reliability margin.

The .505 Gibbs has a unique bullet diameter of .505 in (12.8 mm) while most other .50 caliber bullets have diameters of .510 in (13.0 mm). Barnes Bullets and Woodleigh Bullets are a few of the bullet manufacturers who produce component bullets for reloading in this caliber. Woodleigh Bullets does not recommend impact velocities of over 2,200 ft/s (670 m/s) for their .505 caliber 600 gr weldcore bullets.

George Gibbs Ltd. (England) continues to manufacture .505 Gibbs rifles; other premium dangerous game rifle makers, such as Hartmann & Weiss and Westley Richards build expensive and reliable .505 Gibbs rifles on Mauser 98 actions.

Ceska Zbrojovka (CZ) no longer manufactures the Safari Classics rifle for this cartridge (Discontinued 2020) . Doumoulin Herstal SA of Belgium offers the cartridge in their White Hunter model.

As of 2019, Federal, Kynoch, Norma, and Swift are offering factory loaded ammunition in .505 Gibbs. Bullets for reloading are available from Barnes, Cutting Edge Bullets, North Fork Bullets, and Woodleigh Bullets.

== Design and specifications ==
The .505 Gibbs is one of the most voluminous cases designed. The large volume was required as the cartridge was designed to burn cordite as its propellant. The C.I.P. has published specifications for the cartridge.

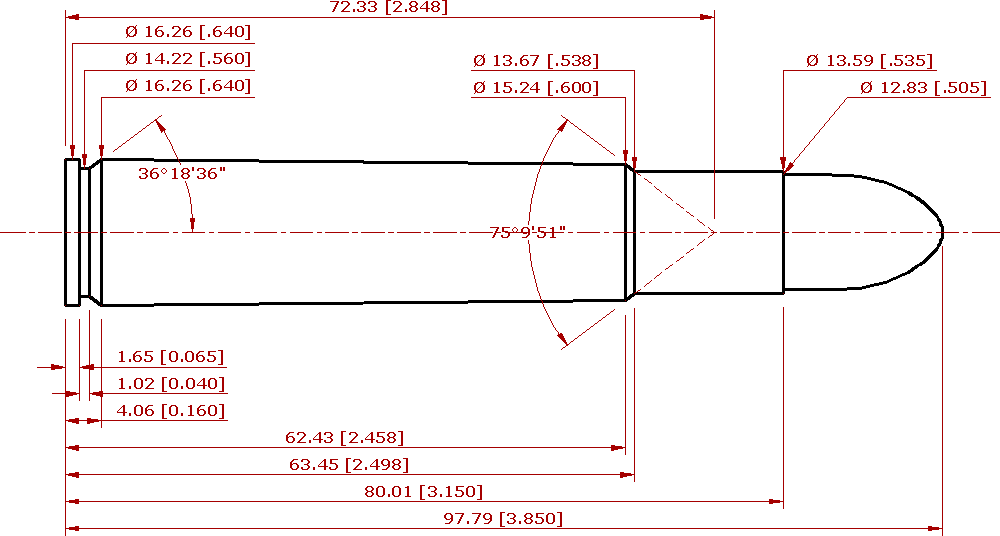

The C.I.P. recommends that commencement of rifling begin at 8.97 mm (0.353 in). Bore diameter is given as 12.55 mm (0.494 in) and groove diameter is 12.80 mm (0.504 in). The C.I.P. recommends a five groove barrel contour with each groove having an arc length of 5.33 mm (0.210 in) and a twist rate of one revolution in 406 mm (16.0 in). The recommended pressure for the .505 Gibbs is 2,700 bar (39,000 psi).

== Sporting use ==
The .505 Gibbs is a niche cartridge designed for hunting heavy, thick-skinned dangerous game animals, such as cape buffalo, elephant, and rhino.

== In literature ==
The cartridge's claim to fame was its use by the fictional character, Robert Wilson, the hunter of Ernest Hemingway's short story "The Short Happy Life of Francis Macomber".

== See also ==
- .338 Xtreme
- .408 Chey Tac
- .50 BMG
- .500 Jeffery
- .500 Nitro Express
- .500 No. 2 Express
- .577/.500 Magnum Nitro Express
- .577 Tyrannosaur
- 12 mm caliber
- Hartmann & Weiss
- List of rifle cartridges
