= H&W =

H&W may refer to:

- Harland and Wolff, a British shipyard company
- Hartmann & Weiss, a German firearm manufacturer
- Hereford and Worcester, a former English county
- Hunton & Williams, the former name of American law firm Hunton Andrews Kurth
