= Precision Sniper Rifle =

United States military weapons program

The Precision Sniper Rifle (PSR) was a program by United States Special Operations Command to replace all bolt-action sniper rifles in use by United States special operations snipers with a single bolt-action rifle chambered for a large caliber Magnum round such as .300 Win Mag and .338 Lapua Magnum. The solicitation was placed on January 15, 2009. The contract was awarded to the Remington Modular Sniper Rifle and was designated the Mk 21 Precision Sniper Rifle.

== History ==
A 2008 United States military market survey for a Precision Sniper Rifle (PSR) called for 1 minute of arc (0.3 milliradian) extreme vertical spread for all shots in a 5-round group fired at targets at 300, 600, 900, 1,200 and 1,500 meters.

In 2009, a United States Special Operations Command market survey called for 1 MOA (0.3 mrad) extreme vertical spread for all shots in a 10-round group fired at targets at 300, 600, 900, 1,200 and 1,500 meters. The 2009 Precision Sniper Rifle requirements stated that the PSR when fired without suppressor should provide a confidence factor of 80% that the weapon and ammunition combination is capable of holding 1 MOA extreme vertical spread, calculated from 150 ten (10) round groups fired unsuppressed. No individual group to exceed 1.5 MOA (0.5 mrad) extreme vertical spread. All accuracy taken at the 1,500-meter point. Other requirements include a weight of less than 18 pounds loaded, the use of Picatinny rails, and an easily changeable barrel.

== Tender criteria ==
Sniper Rifle requirements included:

1. The system shall be chambered to safely fire factory produced "non-wildcat" Small Arms Ammunition Manufacturing Institute (SAAMI) or Commercial European standard (CIP) ammunition.
2. The action can be either manually or gas operated and available in left and right hand versions.
3. With primary day optic and ammunition the system shall provide 1.0 MOA from 300 to 1500 meters (in 300 meter increments) when fired from the shoulder or an accuracy fixture in nominal conditions.
  This is further defined as 1 MOA Extreme Vertical Spread for all shots in a 10 round group at the stated distances.
4. Mean Rounds Between Failures (MRBF) shall be 1000 rounds.
5. The system shall have an overall length no greater than 52" in full configuration / extended excluding suppressor with a single component no greater in length than 40".
6. The system shall weigh no more than 18 lbs with a 12:00 MilStd 1913 rail and a loaded magazine with 5 rounds.
7. The system shall be capable of operator breakdown into major components in less than two minutes.
8. The system will assemble from the major component breakdown in less than two minutes by the operator.
9. The system will assemble from breakdown with no change in weapon zero.
10. The system will have an integral MilStd 1913 rail at the 12:00 position, the rail will be capable of maintaining bore sight alignment and weapon zero while conducting routine firing combined with combat movement and operational training drills.

== PSR contenders ==
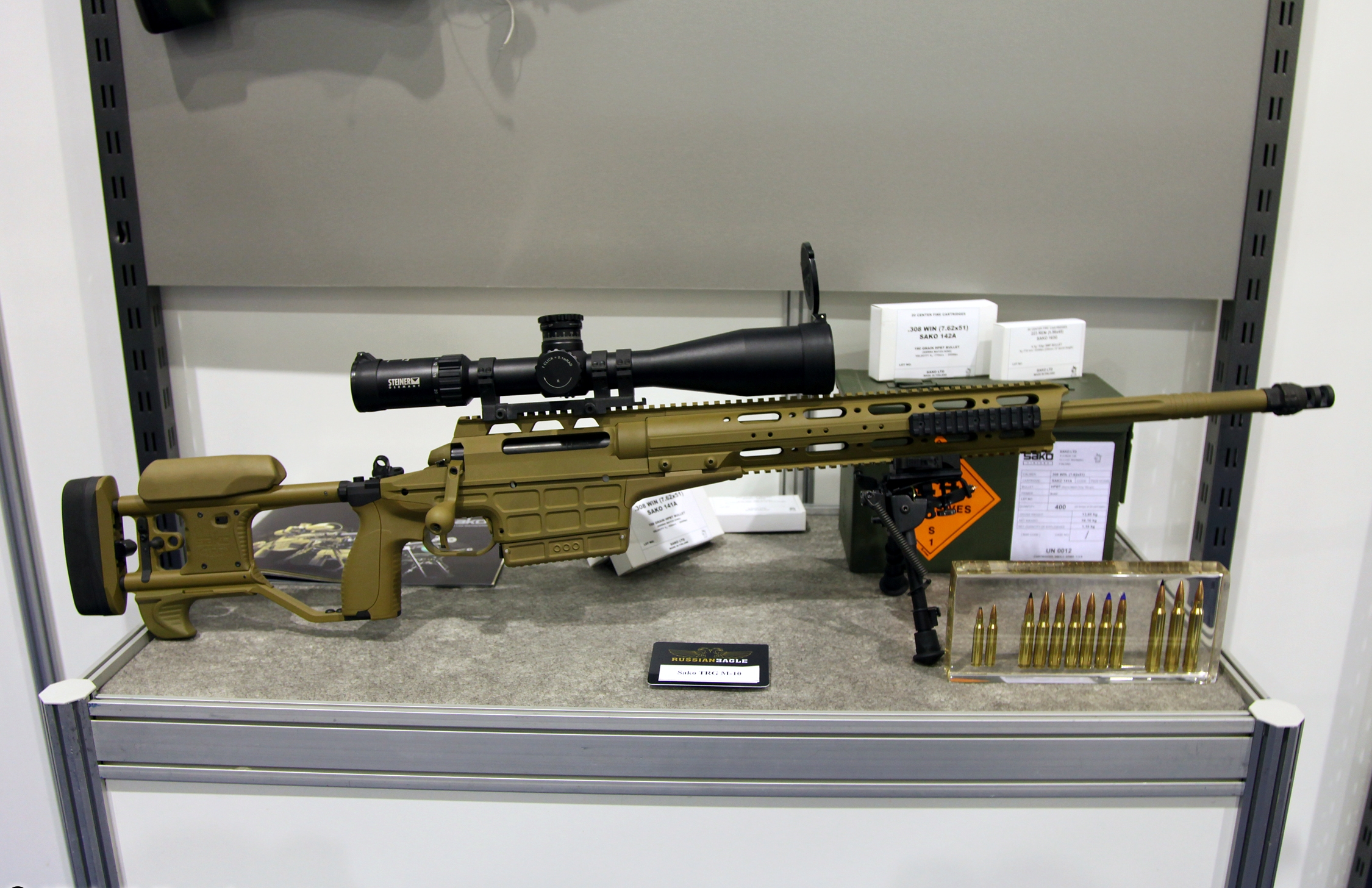
SAKO TRG M10, runner up

Contenders for the contract included:

- Accuracy International AX338
- ArmaLite AR-30
- Barrett MRAD (Multi-Role Adaptive Design)
- Blaser Tactical 2
- Desert Tactical Arms SRS
- FN Ballista
- PGM 338
- Remington Modular Sniper Rifle
- Sako TRG M10

== Selection ==
On March 8, 2013, Remington announced that the Remington MSR had won the contract, beating out the Sako TRG M10. The contract is worth US$79.7 million for 5,150 rifles including suppressors, and 4,696,800 rounds of ammunition over the following ten years.

== Re-competition ==
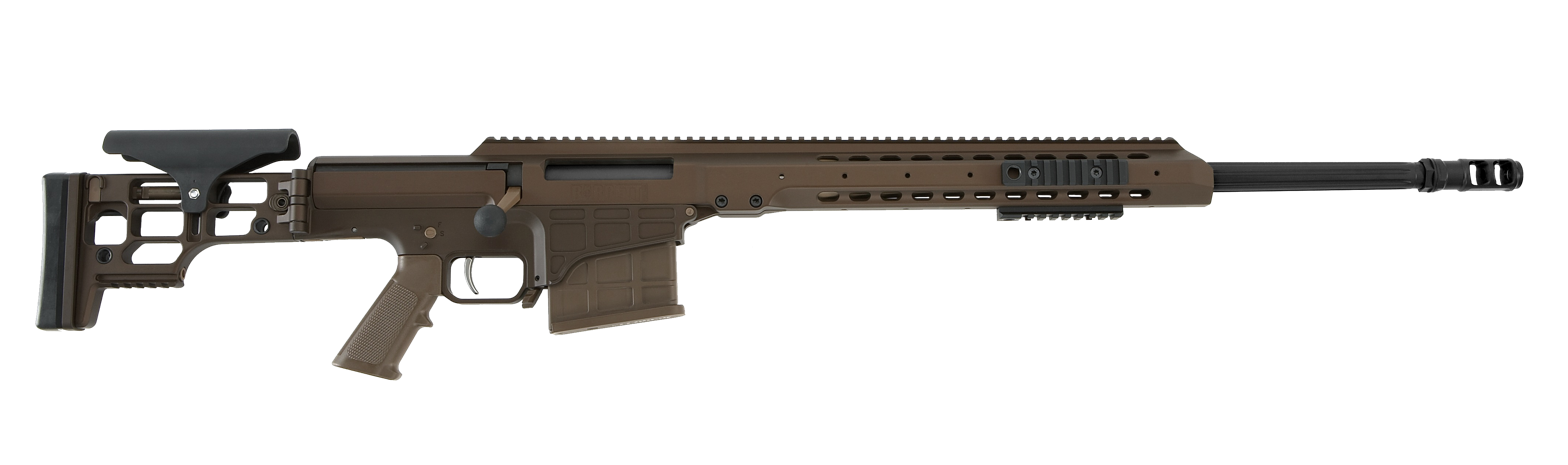
Barrett MRAD rifle

In 2018, it was decided that the Mk 21 did not conform to SOCOM requirements at the time, and the program was re-competed. In 2019, the Barrett MRAD was selected, becoming the Mk 22 Advanced Sniper Rifle.

== See also ==
- M2010 Enhanced Sniper Rifle – US bolt-action sniper rifle
- Mk 14 Enhanced Battle Rifle – American selective fire military designated marksman rifle
