= .300 Norma Magnum =

Cartridge developed by Norma Precision

- Type: Rifle
- Place of origin: Sweden

Production history
- Designer: Norma
- Designed: 2012

Specifications
- Parent case: .338 Norma Magnum
- Case type: Rimless, bottleneck
- Bullet diameter: 7.83 mm (0.308 in)
- Neck diameter: 8.68 mm (0.342 in)
- Shoulder diameter: 14.29 mm (0.563 in)
- Base diameter: 14.87 mm (0.585 in)
- Rim diameter: 14.93 mm (0.588 in)
- Rim thickness: 1.52 mm (0.060 in)
- Case length: 63.30 mm (2.492 in)
- Overall length: 93.50 mm (3.681 in)
- Case capacity: 6.75 cm^{3} (104.2 gr H_{2}O)
- Rifling twist: 229 mm (1 in 9 in)
- Primer type: Large rifle magnum
- Maximum pressure (CIP): 440.00 MPa (63,817 psi)

Ballistic performance
Bullet mass/type	Velocity	Energy
220 gr (14 g) MatchKing	3,003 ft/s (915 m/s)	4,404 ft⋅lbf (5,971 J)
240 gr (16 g) Sierra MatchKing	2,943 ft/s (897 m/s)	4,615 ft⋅lbf (6,257 J)
- Sources: Cartridges of the World, 2012

The .300 Norma Magnum, also known as .300 NM or 300 Norma, is a centerfire magnum rifle cartridge developed by Swedish ammunition manufacturer Norma Precision. The .300 Norma Magnum uses a .338 Norma Magnum parent case necked down to .30 caliber, named to differentiate it from the older .308 Norma Magnum designed in 1960, and has begun to gain popularity among long-range shooters. According to the official C.I.P. (French: Commission Internationale Permanente pour l'Epreuve des Armes à Feu Portatives) rulings, the .300 Norma Magnum can handle up to 440.00 MPa (63,817 psi) P_{max} piezo pressure.

The United States Special Operations Command (USSOCOM) chose the new MK22 Advanced Sniper Rifle, which is chambered in .300 Norma Magnum (designated M1163) as well as .338 Norma Magnum.

== Chambering availability ==
The .300 Norma Magnum chambering is offered in these factory rifles:

- Barrett MRAD
- Blaser R8
- Voere X3 and X4
- Desert-Tech SRSA2
- Sako TRG M10 - Multi-caliber rifle
- Steyr SSG M1 A2
- S.W.O.R.D. International Mk-18 Mod 1 Mjölnir (designated marksman rifle)
- Cadex CDX R7
- Accuracy International AXSR and AXMC

== See also ==
- .338 Lapua Magnum
- .338 Remington Ultra Magnum
- .338-378 Weatherby Magnum
- .338-416
- .338 Chey Tac
- .338 Edge
- .338 Xtreme
- 8 mm caliber
- List of rifle cartridges
