= Barrett MRAD =

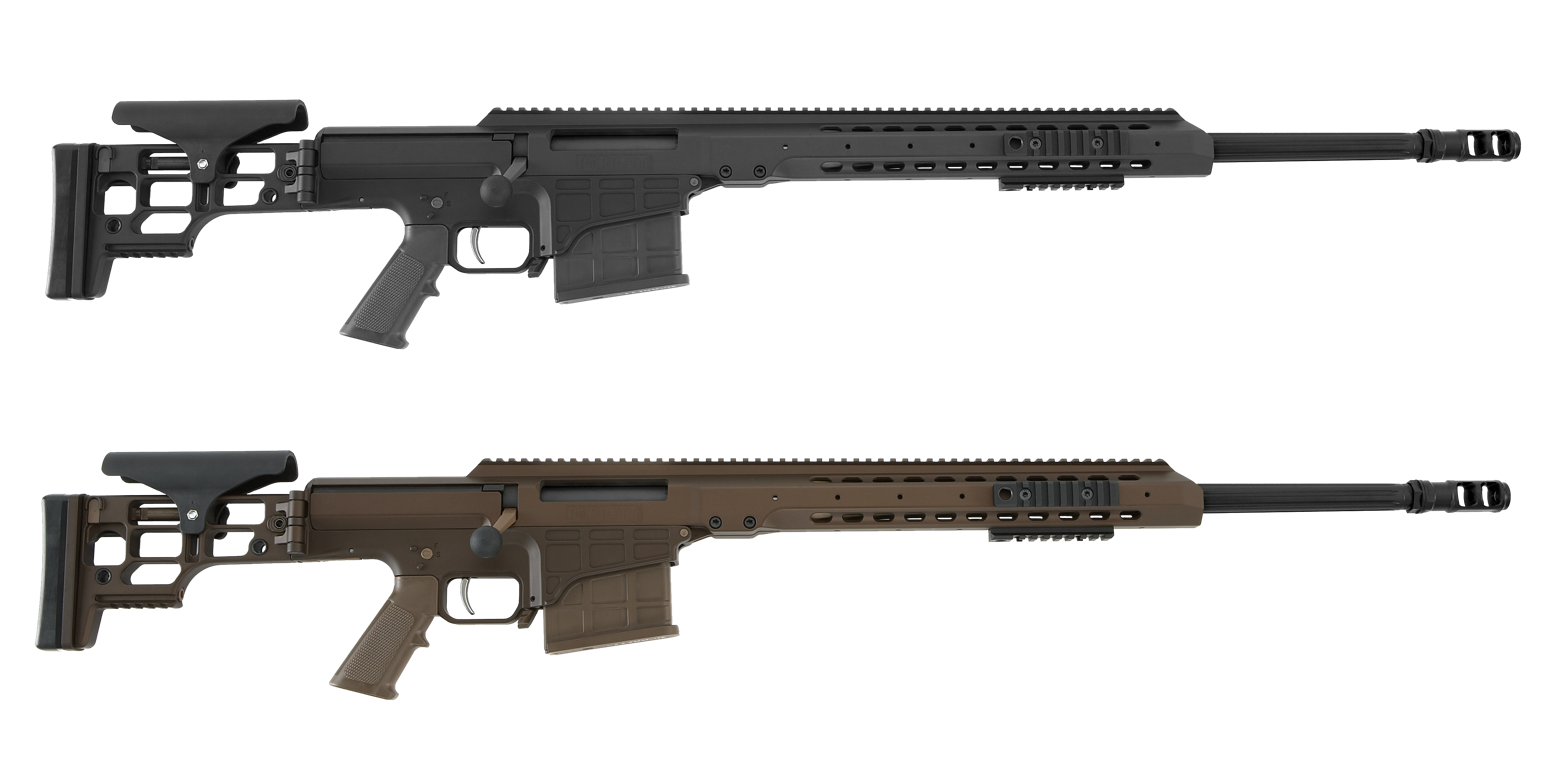
- Barrett MRAD in various colors
- Type: Sniper rifle
- Place of origin: United States

Service history
- In service: 2013–present
- Used by: See Users

Production history
- Designer: Chris Barrett
- Manufacturer: Barrett Firearms Company

Specifications
- Mass: 13.9 lb (6.3 kg) (20" barrel); 14.8 lb (6.7 kg) (24.5" barrel); 15.3 lb (6.9 kg) (27" barrel)
- Length: 42.4 in (108 cm) (20" barrel); 46.9 in (119 cm) (24.5" barrel); 49.4 in (125 cm) (27" barrel)
- Barrel length: 20 in (51 cm); 24.5 in (62 cm); 27 in (69 cm)
- Cartridge: 6.5 Creedmoor; .260 Remington; 7mm Remington Magnum; .308 Winchester; 7.62×51mm NATO; .300 Winchester Magnum; .300 PRC; .300 Norma Magnum; .338 Norma Magnum; .338 Lapua Magnum
- Action: Bolt-action
- Effective firing range: 1,600 yards (1,500 m)
- Feed system: 10-round detachable box magazine

The Barrett MRAD (Multi-Role Adaptive Design) is a bolt-action sniper rifle designed by Barrett to meet the requirements of the SOCOM PSR. The MRAD is based on the Barrett 98B and includes a number of modifications and improvements. The Barrett MRAD was named the 2012 Rifle of the Year by Shooting Illustrated magazine.

== Design ==
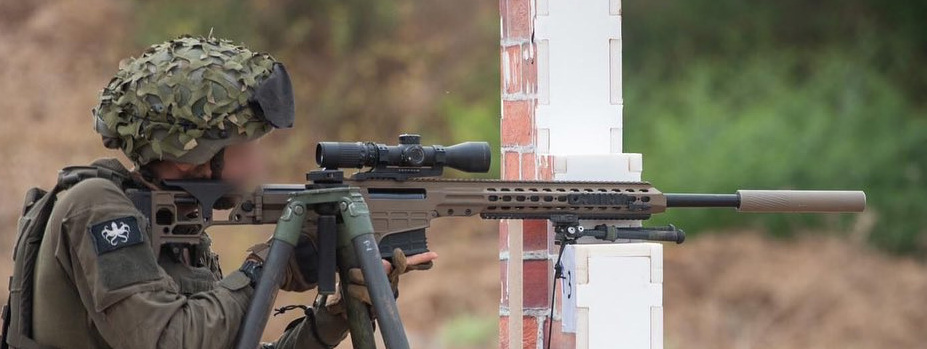
Israel Defense Forces sniper with the Barrett MRAD during a sniping competition, 2023

After the United States Special Operations Command (USSOCOM) announced their desire for a new precision sniper rifle in December 2009, Barrett created the MRAD in accordance with the specifications laid out by SOCOM. The rifle has a folding stock that latches to the bolt handle.

A major MRAD feature (and requirement of the military PSR solicitation) is a field-changeable barrel/caliber capability. Loosening two Torx screws in the receiver allows the removal of the barrel from the front of the receiver/handguard. With only a bolt face change, and in some cases a magazine change, caliber may be changed. The factory headspaced bolt face is provided with each barrel. Barrel/caliber change can occur in less than two minutes. In addition to the typical military requested calibers of .338 Lapua Magnum, .300 Winchester Magnum and .308 Winchester, Barrett also offers caliber conversion kits in .338 and .300 Norma Magnum, 7mm Remington Magnum, .260 Remington and 6.5mm Creedmoor. Barrel lengths are offered in 17 to 26 in (430 to 660 mm), but not in all calibers. Barrels are available in fluted and heavy profiles. The trigger module can be removed without tools, providing access to user-adjustable trigger pull weight and over-travel, and making cleaning easier.

Additional features of the MRAD include a single-button length-of-pull adjustment, adjustable cheek rest height, a polymer bolt guide which acts as a dust cover to reduce debris entering the action, a user-reversible AR-15-style safety, an ambidextrous magazine release, and the ability to accept standard M16/AR15-style pistol grips. Early MRADs had a 30 MOA slope, full-length 21.75 in (552 mm) MIL-STD-1913 Picatinny rail on top of the receiver/handguard. Current MRADs feature a 10 milliradian (MIL/MRAD) slope rail. Shorter 2–4 in (51–102 mm) Picatinny rail blocks may be user-positioned at 3-, 6-, and 9 o'clock at several fore/aft positions along the handguard. MRADs are offered in several cerakote colors. Similar to the M16/AR15, the MRAD upper and lower receivers can be separated by pressing a rear latch assembly under the stock while the front detent pin acts as a hinge to allow for maintenance in the field.

With quality .300 Winchester Magnum ammunition, the Barrett MRAD achieved shot groupings that averaged 0.45 MOA, with the best of them measuring 0.31 MOA.

== Variants ==
=== Precision Sniper Rifle ===
The particular model of the MRAD that was submitted for USSOCOM's MK21 PSR trial was fitted with a 24.5 in (62 cm) barrel, and weighed 14.8 lb (6.7 kg) (without an optic). In 2013, the Remington Modular Sniper Rifle was selected as the winner of the PSR competition. However, in 2018, it was decided that the MK21 did not conform to SOCOM requirements at the time, and the program was re-competed as the MK22 ASR (Advanced Sniper Rifle).

=== Mk 22 ASR and Mk 22 PSR ===
Mk 22 MOD 0 ASR (Advanced Sniper Rifle) is the designation for the Barrett MRAD variant ordered by USSOCOM. In 2019, USSOCCOM awarded Barrett Manufacturing a US$50 million contract for the ASR (Advanced Sniper Rifle) contract, ordering the Barrett MRAD with the ability to convert chambering between 7.62×51mm NATO, .300 Norma Magnum, and .338 Norma Magnum. The Mk 22 ASR is issued with Barrett's AML 338 suppressor and paired with the Precision Variable Power Scopes (P-VPS) SU-295/PVS Nightforce ATACR 5-25×56 and SU-295/PVS Nightforce ATACR 7-35×56.

Mk 22 PSR (Precision Sniper Rifle) is the designation for the Barrett MRAD variant ordered by the US Army. In 2021, the US Army awarded Barrett a US$49.9 million contract for delivery of 2,800 Mk 22 PSR rifles, while the Marine Corps planned to order 250. The Mk 22 PSR will have conversion kits for .338 Norma Magnum, .300 Norma Magnum, and 7.62×51mm NATO. However, unlike the Mk 22 ASR, it is issued with a Leupold Mark 5HD 5-25x56mm scope. The Army plans for the Mk 22 to replace the currently in use M107 and M2010 sniper rifles. The Marine Corps intends to have the Mk 22 to replace all M40A6 and Mk 13 MOD 7 sniper rifles. The Mk 22 reached full operational capability in November 2024 in the U.S. Marine Corps with all infantry and reconnaissance units completing new equipment training on the system and fielding it.

== Users ==
- Colombia: MRADs procured for Colombian Army, chambered in 7.62x51mm and .338 Lapua Magnum with AM338 Suppressors and Leupold Mark 5HD scopes.
- El Salvador
- Greece
- Indonesia: In use by the Indonesian Marine Corps, Amphibious Reconnaissance Battalion.
- Israel: In 2013, the MRAD was adopted by the Yamam, Israel's elite counter-terrorism and SWAT unit, as their long range sniper rifle, to replace old PGM 338 rifles. In 2018, the MRAD was adopted by the Israel Defense Forces.
- New Zealand: Introduced in 2018 as a replacement for the 7.62mm Arctic Warfare sniper rifles
- Norway: Ordered by the Norwegian Armed Forces in 2013. In use with Norwegian Special Operations Forces since 2015, as well as Kystjegerkommandoen and several Norwegian Army units. Snipers of Beredskapstroppen Delta of the Norwegian Police have also been seen with this rifle.
- South Korea: Used by the 707th Special Mission Group.
- Ukraine: Snipers in the AFU have been reported to be using MRAD rifles.
- United States: Mk 22 MOD 0 Advanced Sniper Rifle (ASR) ordered by the U.S. Special Operations Command. Mk 22 Precision Sniper Rifle (PSR) ordered by US Army. On November 21, 2024, the US Marine Corps announced that the Mk 22 rifle had reached full operational capability a year ahead of schedule.

=== Non-state users ===
- Arakan Army: Seen in 2018 during a 9th year anniversary parade.

== Gallery ==
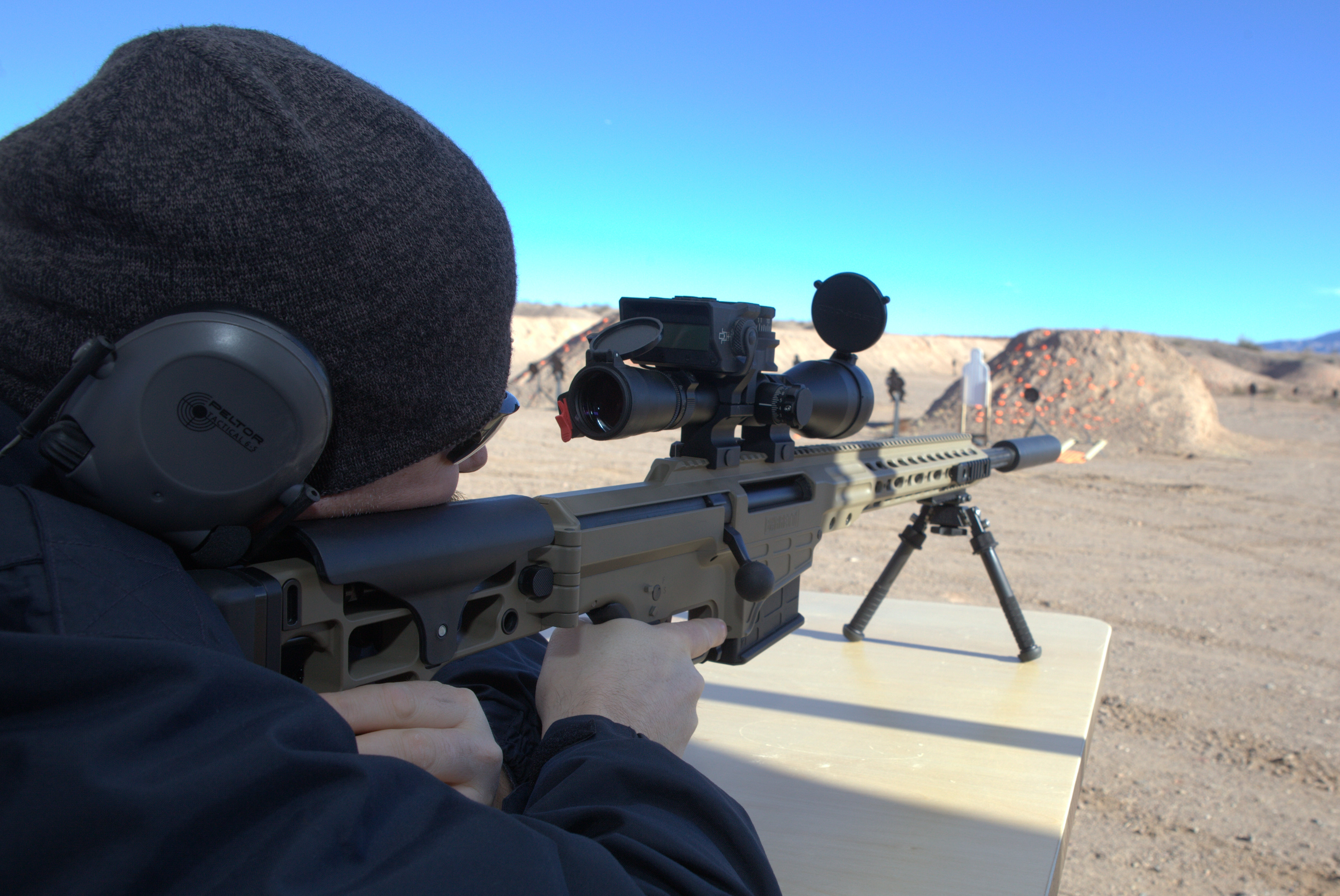
Shooting a Barrett MRAD chambered for .308 Winchester with suppressor

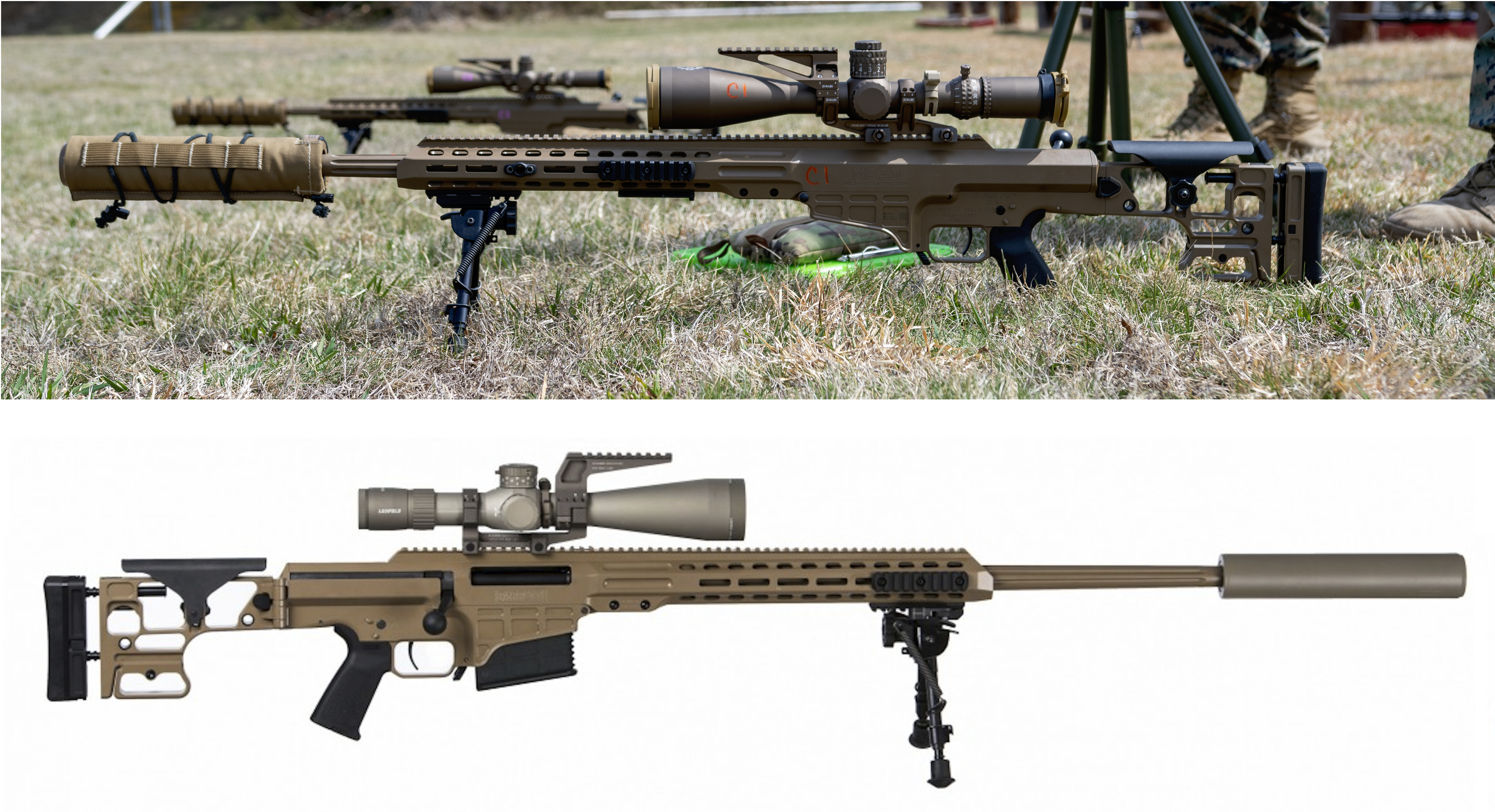
SOCOM MK 22 MOD 0 ASR (above) compared to Army MK 22 PSR (below)

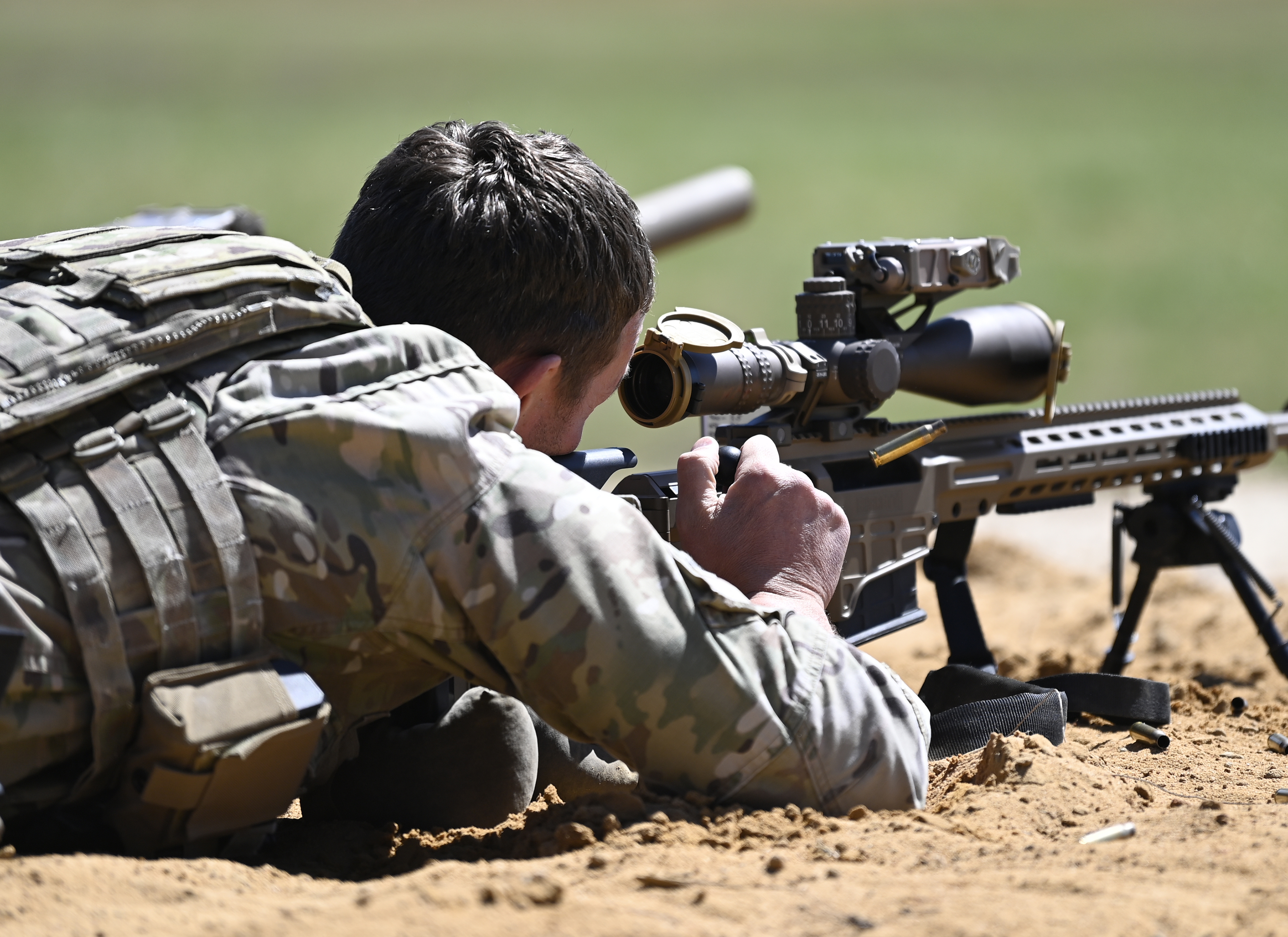
MK 22 ASR being fired at USASOC International Sniper Competition

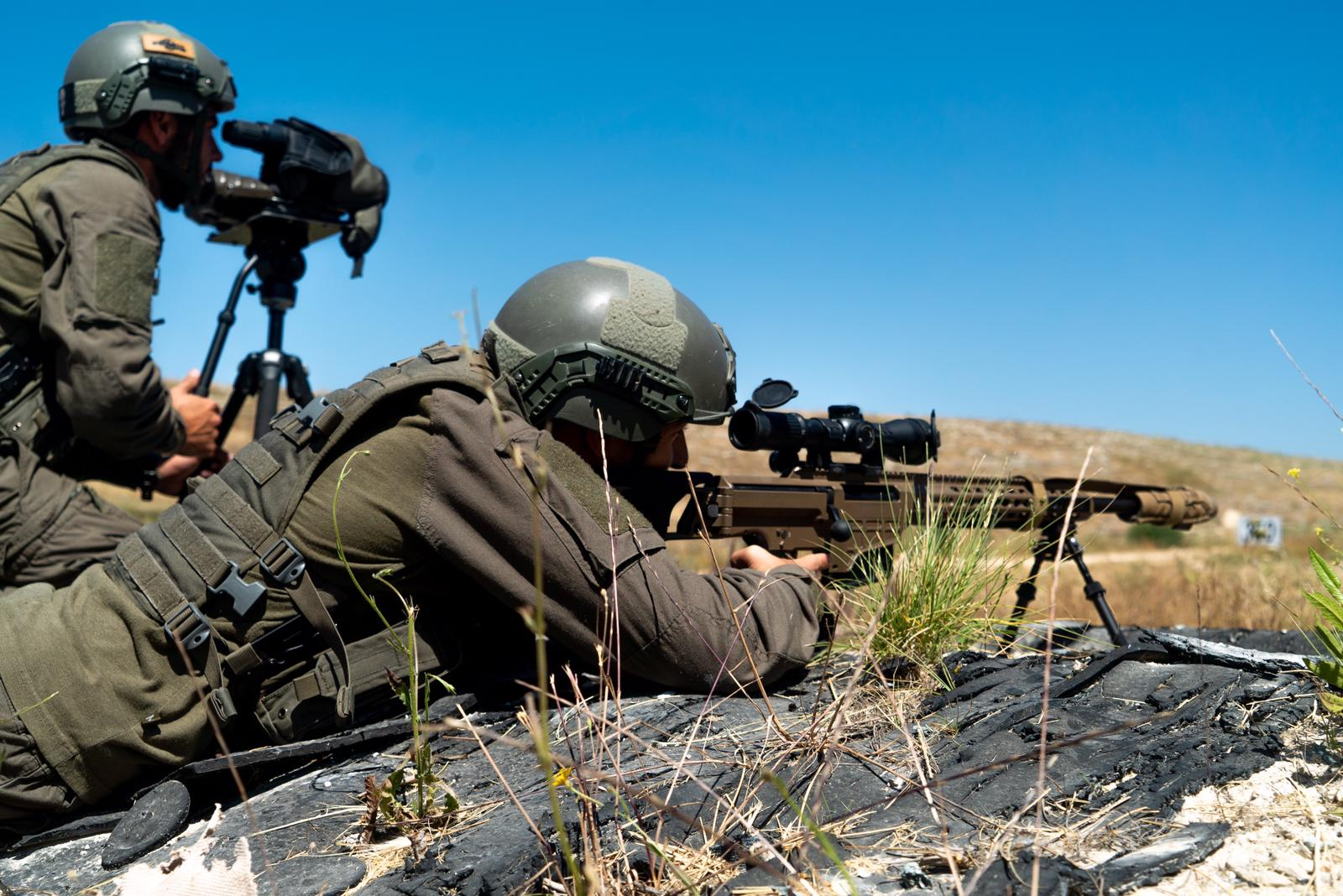
Israel Defense Forces snipers shooting a Barrett MRAD chambered for 7.62×51 mm NATO

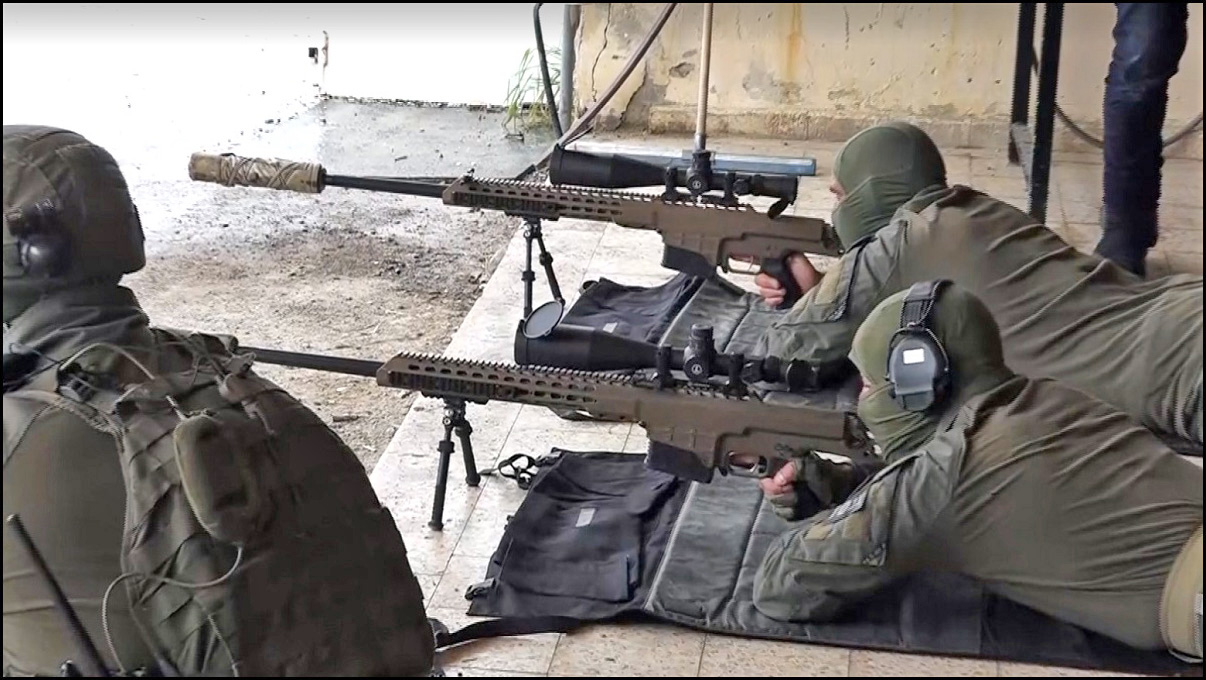
Israeli YAMAM snipers shooting a suppressed Barrett MRAD

== See also ==
- M110A1 rifle
