= FN Ballista =

- Type: Sniper Rifle

Production history
- Manufacturer: FN Herstal
- Produced: 2013–2021

Specifications
- Mass: 7.54kg
- Cartridge: .308 Winchester; .300 Winchester Magnum; .338 Lapua Magnum
- Action: Bolt Action
- Rate of fire: 10-20 (Practical)
- Feed system: .308 Win.: 7 or 15 rounds; .300 Win. Mag.: 6 or 10 rounds; .338 Lapua: 5 or 8 rounds

The FN Ballista is a sniper rifle developed by FN Herstal. The company states that the Ballista's design compares with the Remington MSR, the Sako TRG M10, the Armalite AR-30, and the Accuracy International AWM. The Ballista eventually was defeated by the Remington MSR, which was selected as the winner of the US Military PSR competition.

== Design ==
The Ballista is a modular, air-cooled, magazine-fed, manually operated, bolt-action sniper rifle that is multi-caliber capable. It comes standard equipped with several MIL-STD 1913 rails located at both the 6 and 12 o'clock positions of the rifle in order to mount various attachments that will fit the operator's needs. Additional rails are also available as optional accessories. The Ballista features a fully adjustable, side-folding stock that can be outfitted with a monopod as well.
