= Sako TRG =

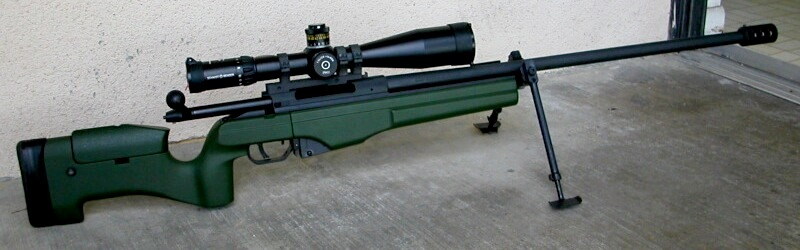
- Sako TRG-42 sniper rifle
- Type: Sniper rifle
- Place of origin: Finland

Service history
- In service: 2000–present
- Used by: See Users
- Wars: War in Afghanistan (2001–2021); Iraq War; Russian Invasion of Ukraine

Production history
- Designed: 1989 (TRG-21 / TRG-41); 1999 (TRG-22 / TRG-42); 2011 (TRG M10); 2024 (TRG-62 A1)
- Manufacturer: Sako
- Produced: 1989–1999 (TRG-21 / TRG-41); 1999–present (TRG-22 / TRG-42); 2011–present (TRG M10); 2024–present (TRG-62 A1)
- Variants: See Variants

Specifications
- Mass: 4.7 kg (10.4 lb) empty (TRG-22 black); 4.9 kg (10.8 lb) empty (TRG-22 green/tan/dark earth); 5.2 kg (11.5 lb) empty (TRG-22 fold. stock 510 mm barrel); 5.4 kg (11.9 lb) empty (TRG-22 fold. stock 660 mm barrel); 5.1 kg (11.2 lb) empty (TRG-42 black); 5.3 kg (11.7 lb) empty (TRG-42 green/tan/dark earth); 5.8 kg (12.8 lb) empty (TRG-42 fold. stock 690 mm barrel); 7.0 kg (15.4 lb) empty (TRG-62 A1)
- Length: 1,000 mm (39.37 in) (TRG-22 510 mm barrel); 1,150 mm (45.28 in) (TRG-22); 1,020 mm (40.16 in) (TRG-42 folded stock 510 mm barrel); 1,200 mm (47.24 in) (TRG-42)
- Barrel length: 510 mm (20.08 in) (TRG-22 and TRG-42 folded stock); 660 mm (25.98 in) (TRG-22); 690 mm (27.17 in) (TRG-42)); 762 mm (30.00 in) (TRG-62 A1)
- Cartridge: .260 Remington (TRG-22); 6.5mm Creedmoor (TRG-22 A1).308 Winchester (7.62×51mm NATO) (TRG-21, TRG-22).300 Winchester Magnum (TRG-41, TRG-42).338 Lapua Magnum (TRG-41, TRG-42).375 CheyTac (9.5×77mm) (TRG-62 A1)
- Action: Bolt-action
- Effective firing range: 800 m (875 yd) (TRG-22 .308 Winchester); 1,100 m (1,203 yd) (TRG-42 .300 Winchester Magnum); 1,500 m (1,640 yd) (TRG-42 .338 Lapua Magnum); 2,000 m (2,187 yd) (TRG-62 A1 .375 CheyTac)
- Feed system: 5-round detachable box magazine (.338 Lapua Magnum); 7-round detachable box magazine (.300 Winchester Magnum and .375 CheyTac); 10-round detachable box magazine (.308 Winchester)
- Sights: Aperture rear (with flip-up open tritium night/combat sight); day or night optics

The Sako TRG (short for Finnish: "Tarkkuuskivääri Riihimäki G-sarja", "Riihimäki Precision Rifle G-series") is a bolt-action sniper rifle line designed and manufactured by Finnish firearms manufacturer SAKO of Riihimäki. It is the successor to the SAKO TR-6 target rifle, and thus the letter G within the rifle's name is meant to represent number 7 (since G is the seventh letter in alphabetical order).

The TRG-21 and TRG-22 (A1) are designed to fire standard .308 Winchester (7.62×51mm NATO) sized cartridges, while the TRG-41 and TRG-42 (A1) are designed to fire more powerful and dimensionally larger .300 Winchester Magnum (7.62×67mm) and .338 Lapua Magnum (8.6×70mm) cartridges. They are available with olive drab green, desert tan/coyote brown, dark earth or black stocks, and are also available with a folding stock. The TRG-62 A1 was added to the product range as the third and largest iteration, designed to fire the even more powerful and dimensionally larger .375 CheyTac (9.5×77mm) cartridge.

The sniper rifles are normally fitted with muzzle brakes to reduce recoil, jump and flash. The Sako factory TRG muzzle brakes vent sideways and are detachable. Generally TRGs are outfitted with a Zeiss or Schmidt & Bender PM II telescopic sight with fixed power of magnification or with variable magnification. Variable telescopic sights can be used if the operator wants more flexibility to shoot at varying ranges, or when a wide field of view is required.

In October 2011, Sako introduced the TRG M10 Sniper Weapon System. It was designed as a user configurable multi calibre modular system responding to evolving market demands and does not share its receiver and other technical features with the rest of the (single caliber) TRG line.

== History ==
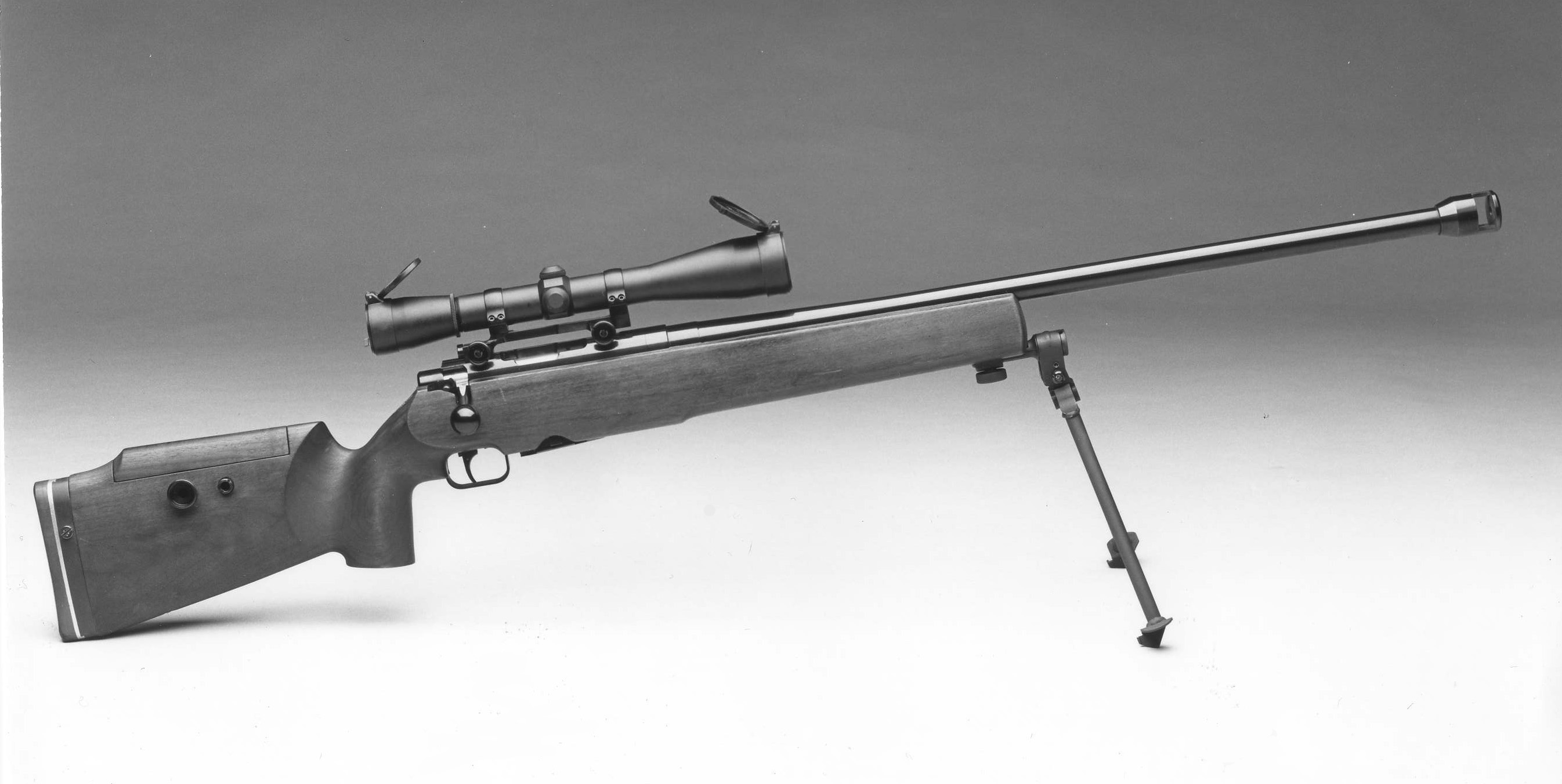
The Valmet Sniper M86 was used as a basis for the Sako TRG sniper rifle line

Even though the TRG-21 obtained its origins from the successful Sako TR-6 target rifle and 1984–1986 development work for the hardly produced Valmet Sniper M86 rifle by the former Finnish state firearms company Valmet which merged with Sako, the 4.7 kg (10 lb 6 oz) TRG-21 was designed as a result of a thorough study of sniper requirements.

=== TRG-21 and TRG-41 ===
In 1989 Sako Ltd. (Riihimäki, Finland) introduced the TRG-21 precision rifle as a sniper rifle model chambered in .308 Winchester. With the introduction of the TRG bolt-action, Sako moved away from the modified two-lug Mauser bolt-actions, favoured during the past, to an action with a symmetrical three-lug bolt of 19 mm (0.75 in) diameter, displaying a locking surface of 75 mm^{2} (0.116 in^{2}). The TRG-21 action was designed for a maximum cartridge length of 75 mm (2.95 in). The evolution of this design continues to the present and can be found in Sako's hunting rifle offerings, the Sako 75 and the Sako 85. Subsequently, a second precision/sniper rifle with a 20 mm (0.79 in) longer scaled up magnum action emerged as the TRG-41 in order to take advantage of the .338 Lapua Magnum cartridge.

=== TRG-S M995 (Magnum) ===
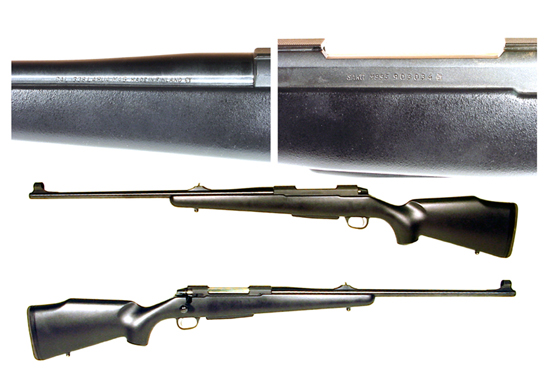
The TRG-S M995 hunting oriented variant of the TRG-41

A more hunting oriented variation of the TRG was introduced in 1992 as the TRG-S M995 and TRG-S M995 Magnum, which both use the same scaled up magnum action and bolt (different bolt handle) as the TRG-41 with the exception that the receiver is open at the top with an integral Sako-type wedged dovetail rail rather than possessing a cartridge ejection port on the right side and a parallel 17 mm (0.67 in) integral dovetail rail as found with the TRG-41. The TRG-S M995 (Magnum) was produced until 2003 and chambered in eight standard chamberings and fourteen magnum chamberings, including .338 Lapua Magnum. All TRG-S M995 rifles utilized the same stock and receiver designed for a maximum cartridge length of 95 mm (3.74 in). Four different sized detachable box magazines and three different bolt bodies were used to accommodate the dimensionally different rifle cartridges offered. A carbine variant of the TRG-S was also produced that according to Sako literature featured a 520 mm (20.5 in) long barrel. However, M995 carbines imported to the United States featured a 495 mm (19.5 in) barrel and were chambered in .375 H&H Magnum only. Sako planned to produce a short action TRG-S M975 designed for a maximum cartridge length of 75 mm (2.95 in), that would have been based on the TRG-21. In the end Sako abandoned this plan and only a handful of M975 prototypes were produced.

=== TRG-22 and TRG-42 ===
Sako TRG-42 chambered in .338 Lapua Magnum used by an Italian soldier

To make the TRG system more suitable for military use, Sako upgraded and improved the TRG-21/41 design in the late 1990s. Some TRG accessories like the muzzle brake and bipod (that lets the rifle swivel or "hang" near its bore axis offering a more stable shooting position with large and heavy aiming optics mounted) were also improved. This resulted in the TRG-22/42 rifle system introduced in 1999.

In June 2007 a voluntary factory recall concerning TRG-22, TRG-42 and M995 (TRG-S) rifles manufactured between October 1999 and October 2002 was put out to correct the possibility that a portion of the firing pin could exit rearwards when firing a defective cartridge.

Around 2011 an American Sako vendor commissioned a special limited production run of TRG-22 sniper rifles chambered in .260 Remington cartridge and started offering them as of May 2011.

In 2013 the TRG system was further upgraded and improved based on customer requirements. The upgrades consist of mounting improved recoil pads to reduce felt recoil, a newly constructed bolt release and a new fully adjustable two-stage trigger mechanism that features a new more ergonomic ambidextrous safety lever, and a trigger guard milled from aluminium for more positive magazine attachment. Further the bolt handle and its attachment to the bolt body were ruggedised. These general 2013 upgrades are backwards compatible with older TRG sniper rifles. Exclusive for the .338 Lapua Magnum chambered TRG-42 model a new bolt featuring double plunger ejectors was introduced in 2013 to improve the ejection reliability of dimensionally large and heavy .338 Lapua Magnum rifle cases.

=== TRG-22 A1 and TRG-42 A1 ===
In 2018 Sako introduced the TRG-22 A1 and TRG-42 A1 models. The TRG A1 models have a Sako TRG M10 Sniper Weapon System alike stock, featuring an aluminium middle chassis frame, side-folding quick adjustable buttstock, and a fore-end with the M-LOK rail interface system that allows for direct accessory attachment onto "negative space" (hollow slot) mounting points. The chassis frame is offered in Tungsten Gray, Olive Drab Green, Graphite Black and Coyote Brown Cerakote (a thin surface coating containing ceramic particles) finishes. The top of the receiver was designed with a built-in 30-MOA Picatinny rail. The fore-end contains a small toolbox that can be accessed with the bolt knob. It contains Torx 25, 15 and 10 head tools to facilitate field adjustments and maintenance. The TRG A1 models do not offer the user configurable multi calibre modular system of the Sako TRG M10 Sniper Weapon System. The bolts of the TRG A1 models all feature double plunger ejectors introduced earlier for the .338 Lapua Magnum TRG-42 and the TRG-22 A1 model expands the chambering palette with 6.5mm Creedmoor.

=== TRG-62 A1 ===
In 2024 the TRG-62 A1 was added to the A1 range as the third and largest iteration, as its action was designed for a maximum cartridge length of well over 95 mm (3.74 in). The up to 113.40 mm (4.46 in) long .375 CheyTac (9.5×77mm) cartridge was selected and introduced to the TRG range to extend the achievable effective range up to 2,000 m (2,187 yd), without having to deal with substantial bolt thrust or breech pressure increase related drawbacks. The TRG-62 A1 uses the trigger unit used in the A1 range and TRG-10 and 350 or 380 gr (22.7 or 24.6 g) 9.5×77mm associated ammunition. The muzzle brake was revised to a four-chamber set up for the new dimensionally larger and more powerful 9.5×77mm chambering. The top of the receiver was revised to a built-in 30-MOA or 45-MOA NATO Accessory Rail and the fore-end contains a small toolbox containing Torx 25, 15 and 10 head tools to facilitate field adjustments and maintenance. It is marketed for "military and law enforcement only". A future TRG-62 A1 variant chambered for the up to 115.50 mm (4.55 in) long .408 CheyTac (10.36×77mm) cartridge is under development.

Sako never totally forgot the target rifle origins of the TRG system. The necessary accessories to attach sighting components such as match grade peep sights or target aperture sights and a mirage strap are all available. Equipped with these accessories the TRG can be used for non military or law enforcement tasks such as 300 m UIT standard rifle competition, CISM competition or other kinds of full bore target shooting. The rifle is commonly seen in long-range competition where it has done very well. Besides civilian target shooting the TRG system can and is sometimes used for hunting.

The TRG system's purposive design features, reliability in adverse conditions and consistent accuracy performance (a capable marksman can expect ≤ 0.5 MOA consistent accuracy with appropriate ammunition) have made it a popular, though expensive, sniper rifle system.

== Design details ==
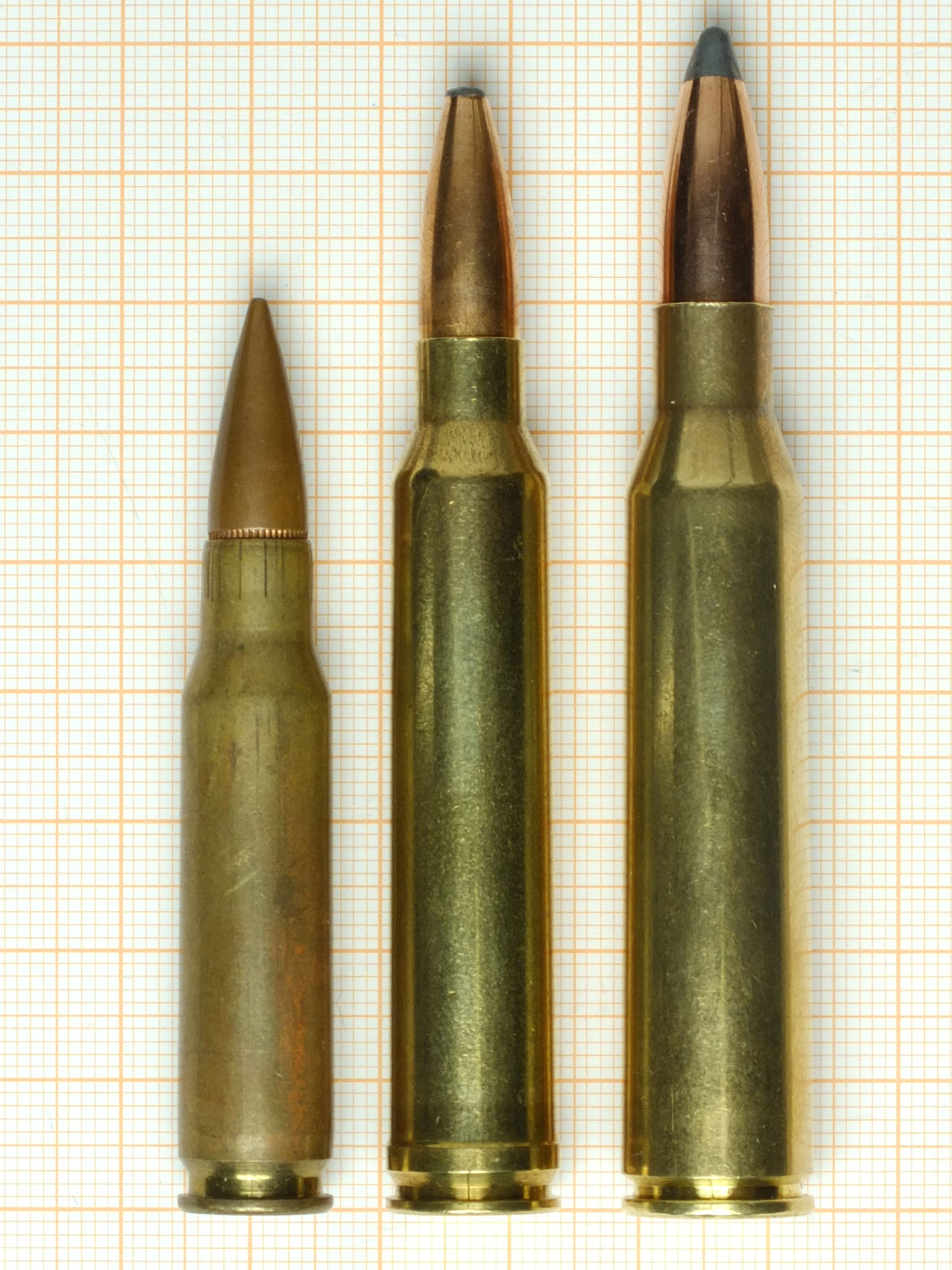
Left to right; .308 Winchester (7.62×51mm NATO), .300 Winchester Magnum (7.62×67mm) and .338 Lapua Magnum (8.6×70mm) cartridges showing their dimensional differences

The TRG system is almost unique in being a purpose-designed sniper rifle, rather than an accurised version of an existing, general-purpose rifle. The sniper rifles can have a matte or manganese phosphatised finish.

=== Features ===
The heart of the TRG system is a cold-hammer forged receiver and barrel. Both provide maximum strength for minimum weight as well as excellent resistance to wear. The action has a hex style profile on top with a smaller closed ejection port. Actions with an ejection port make it more difficult to reach in with a finger to discreetly eject brass when desired, but it does allow for additional strength in the action. The "resistance free" bolt has three massive lugs and requires a 60-degree bolt rotation and a 98 mm (3.86 in) bolt throw for the short and 118 mm (4.65 in) bolt throw for the long bolt-action; these features should be appreciated by the shooter during multiple firings that require rapid projectile placement on the target. The bolt handle is the appropriate length and sports a large synthetic bulbous knob that provides a firm, positive grip. On top of the receiver a 17 mm (0.67 in) integral dovetail rail with shape connection drillings for one or more recoil lugs provides for fixing mounting components to accommodate different types of optical or electro-optical sights. Folding iron sights can be obtained for secondary or emergency use.

The receiver's large bedding surface is mated to an aluminium alloy-bedding block by three screws for maximum stability. This combination ensures an unusually high degree of stability.

=== Ammunition feeding ===
The detachable box magazine is based upon centre feeding for maximum reliability as well as precise positioning of the cartridge into the chamber. Alternatively cartridges can be loaded singly directly into the chamber.

=== Barrel ===
The free-floating, heavy, chrome moly barrels (chrome moly barrels resist throat erosion better offering a longer accuracy life than stainless steel barrels) for the available cartridge chamberings all have a different length, groove cutting and rifling twist rate optimised for their respective chambering and intended ammunition. The .260 Remington, .308 Winchester, .300 Winchester Magnum and .338 Lapua Magnum chamberings are available with barrels of common length for sniper rifles and relatively short 510 mm (20.08 in) long barrels. On special order TRG sniper rifles can also be supplied with stainless steel barrels. Two types of flash eliminator/muzzle brakes are available as an accessory with one being threaded to accommodate a sound-suppressor.

For the .260 Remington chambering a non-traditional 203 mm (1 in 8 inch) or 31.2 calibres right-hand twist rate optimised to stabilise longer, heavier very-low-drag bullets was selected over the standard 229 mm (1 in 9 inch) or 35.2 calibres twist rate. The TRG-22 can be ordered cambered for the .260 Remington cartridge as of May 2011. The introduction of the .260 Remington (6.5×51mm) chambering does not introduce major technical changes for the TRG system since the .260 Remington is essentially a necked down 6.5 mm (.264 in) variant of the .308 Winchester (7.62×51mm) cartridge, meaning these cartridges can be used in .308 Winchester chambered rifles only requiring different barrels.

The 6.5 Creedmoor chambering has the traditional 203 mm (1 in 8 inch) or 31.2 calibres right-hand twist rate shares the relative ease of chambering it in arms designed for .308 Winchester sized cartridges, though the 6.5 Creedmoor (6.5×49mm) maximal overall length is 0.64 mm (0.025 in) longer compared to the .308 Winchester.

For the .308 Winchester chambering the 280 mm (1 in 11 inch) or 36.7 calibres right-hand twist rate with four grooves was selected over the 305 mm (1 in 12 inch) or 40 calibres, traditionally found for the .308 Winchester, as a compromise when switching between supersonic and subsonic cartridges.

The .300 Winchester Magnum chambering also has a non-traditional 280 mm (1 in 11 inch) or 36.7 calibres right-hand twist rate. Due to the .300 Winchester Magnum cartridge dimensions it is a long TRG-41/TRG-42 bolt-action chambering.

For the .338 Lapua Magnum chambering a non-traditional 305 mm (1 in 12 inch) or 36.4 calibres right-hand twist rate was selected to optimise the rifle for firing 16.2 gram (250 grain) .338-calibre very-low-drag bullets. As of 2009 .338 Lapua Magnum barrels can also be supplied with a 254 mm (1 in 10 inch) or 30.3 calibres twist rate optimised to stabilise longer, heavier very-low-drag bullets like the Sierra HPBT MatchKing and Lapua Scenar .338-calibre 19.44 gram (300 grain) bullets. The traditional 254 mm (1 in 10 inch) has since become the standard twist rate for the .338 Lapua Magnum chambering. Due to the .338 Lapua Magnum cartridge dimensions it is a long TRG-41/TRG-42 bolt-action chambering.

=== Trigger ===
The two-stage trigger mechanism displays an adjustable trigger pull weight of 1 to 2.5 kgf (2.2 to 5.5 lbf) and can be adjusted for length, horizontal and vertical pitch. The advantage of these features is to prevent trigger movement in an inappropriate direction that would cause the rifle to move off target. Trigger travel is short with no noticeable over-travel. The trigger mechanism can be removed without additional disassembling of the rifle. The firing pin travel is 6.5 mm (0.26 in). The trigger guard is dimensioned to allow easy access with gloved fingers.

=== Safety ===
The safety lever is located in front of the trigger inside of the trigger guard and can be operated without producing mechanical noise. The two-position safety locks the trigger mechanism, locks the bolt in closed position and blocks the firing pin. The safety is on when it is in its rearmost position. It is off when it is pushed to its most forward position. When the weapon is cocked the firing pin protrudes 1.6 mm (0.06 in) from the rear of the bolt-action, making it possible to feel if the weapon is ready to fire or not in poor visibility.

=== Stock ===
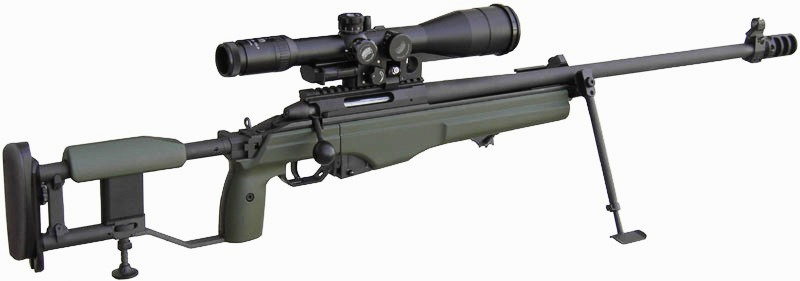
Sako TRG-42 with an optional older model folding stock

The TRG stock design is besides sniping requirements, designed to conform to both UIT and CISM regulations. Sako offers black, green, desert tan or dark earth coloured stock variants and the green, desert tan or dark earth stock variants are 0.2 kg (0.4 lb) heavier than the black variants. In 2011 Sako also began offering stocks in several styles of digital camouflage. The base of the ergonomic injection-moulded polyurethane forestock is made of aluminium and encompasses the bedding block with the bedding block serving as a point of attachment for a bipod. The polyurethane buttstock with its pistol grip and integrated aluminium skeleton to add strength, is designed for right- and left-handed shooters. The rear of the buttstock possesses a series of spacer and angle plates to regulate the length of pull and curvature adjustments that can be tailored for the individual shooter. The buttplate is adjustable for both height and pitch. Finally, the cheek-piece is adjustable for both height and pitch as well.

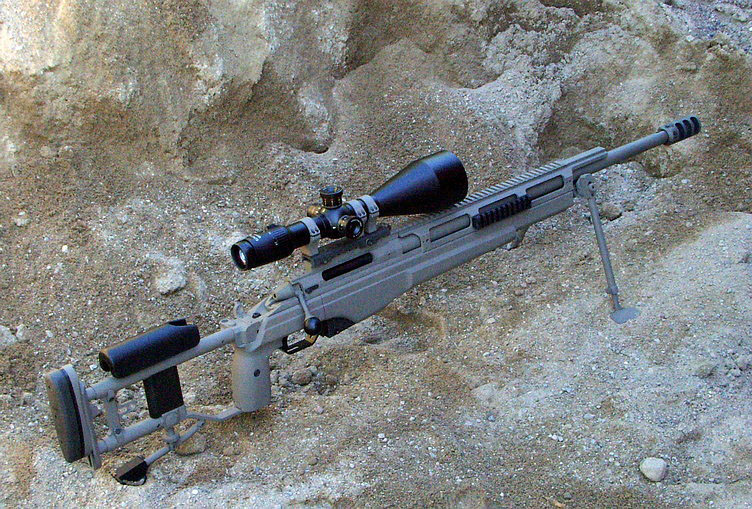
Sako TRG-42 with an optional newer model folding stock in a desert tan finish, an MSSR integrated extended rail system, and a 510 mm (20.08 in) barrel

The stock features two steel sling swivel attachment sockets positioned at the right and left rear sides of the buttstock. Forward sling attachment is achieved by inserting and fixing a metal sling mount into a metal rail which runs under the forestock or forend. This forward sling attachment point can be (re)positioned along the length of the rail for right- or left-handed use and is fixed with a screw. The factory carrying/shooting sling itself features quick mountable and detachable metal swivels. The swivels are mounted by pushing them into an attachment socket and detached by pushing integrated buttons in the swivels and pulling them out of the attachment sockets.

A folding skeleton type buttstock designed for right- and left-handed shooters is also available. The folding stock is 0.5 kg (1.1 lb) heavier than the non-folding green, desert tan or dark earth stock variants and is hinged behind the pistol grip; it folds to the left side and locks into position. When folded, the rifle becomes 250 mm (9.84 in) shorter. The steel parts of the folding stock are manganese phosphatised and the polyurethane parts are coloured olive drab or desert tan. The rear of the buttstock is adjustable for length of pull and height. The cheek-piece and rear support are also adjustable for height. These adjustment options allow shooters of various sizes and shapes to tailor the TRG folding stock to their personal preferences, which is an uncommon feature for folding stocks. The pistol grip body has a steel loop for a hook type military sling swivel. Sako TRG folding stock rifles are supplied with a Picatinny rail for mounting aiming optics.

The folding stock was later redesigned with the most conspicuous change being a bigger "foot" with an external lever/hinge support system monopod instead of the vertical moving small "spike" found on the earlier folding stock.

=== Accessories ===
Sako accessories for the TRG system includes an auxiliary iron sights for emergency use, a muzzle brake/flash-hider, a match sight mounting set, a telescopic sight mounting sets, a STANAG 2324 (Picatinny rail), an accessory ITRS tri-rail (top) and accessory rail (bottom) TRG forestock, a night sight adapter, a sound suppressor, a muzzle thread protector, various slings and swivels, cleaning kits, soft case, and a heavy-duty transit case. Several versions of TRG-specific bipods were produced that all lock into an attachment point in the aluminium bedding block at the end of the forestock. The latest bipod version is one of a few rifle bipods that lets the rifle swivel or "hang" just above its bore axis offering a more stable shooting position with large and heavy aiming optics mounted. It has a narrower leg angle due to complaints that the previous version interfered with some night vision systems mounted forward of the telescopic sight. Further versions of accessories are the ITRS tri-rail NV attachment point with an optional extended aluminium bedding block. This extended bedding block also can feature an optional STANAG 2324 Picatinny rail in the bottom of the block.

== Variants ==
- The Sako TRG-21 (1989) is designed to chamber the .308 Winchester (7.62×51mm NATO) cartridge.
- The Sako TRG-22 (1999) is an upgraded and improved variant of the TRG-21 with a new stock design and a maximum cartridge length of 75 mm (2.95 in). An American Sako vendor also commissioned a special limited production run of the TRG-22 chambered in .260 Remington cartridge.
- The Sako TRG-41 (1989) is designed to chamber either the .338 Lapua Magnum or .300 Winchester Magnum cartridge.
- The Sako TRG-S M995 (1992) is a hunting orientated variant of the TRG-41 designed to chamber eight standard and fourteen magnum chamberings and was produced until 2003.
- The Sako TRG-42 (1999) is an upgraded and improved variant of the TRG-41 with a new stock design and a maximum cartridge length of 95 mm (3.74 in).
- The Beretta TRG-42 was presented by Sako (importer Beretta USA) at the Association of the United States Army (AUSA) Annual Meeting and Exposition in October 2008, as a possible platform for fulfilling the United States Military .338 calibre Precision Sniper Rifle (PSR) solicitations. It is essentially a TRG-42 with a shorter barrel, a folding stock and an integrated extended rail system.
- The Sako TRG-22 A1 (2018) is an upgraded and improved variant of the TRG-22 with a new stock design.
- The Sako TRG-42 A1 (2018) is an upgraded and improved variant of the TRG-42 with a new stock design.
- The Sako TRG-62 A1 (2024) is a variant for longer range chambered for .375 CheyTac (9.5×77mm).

== TRG M10 multi calibre design evolution ==
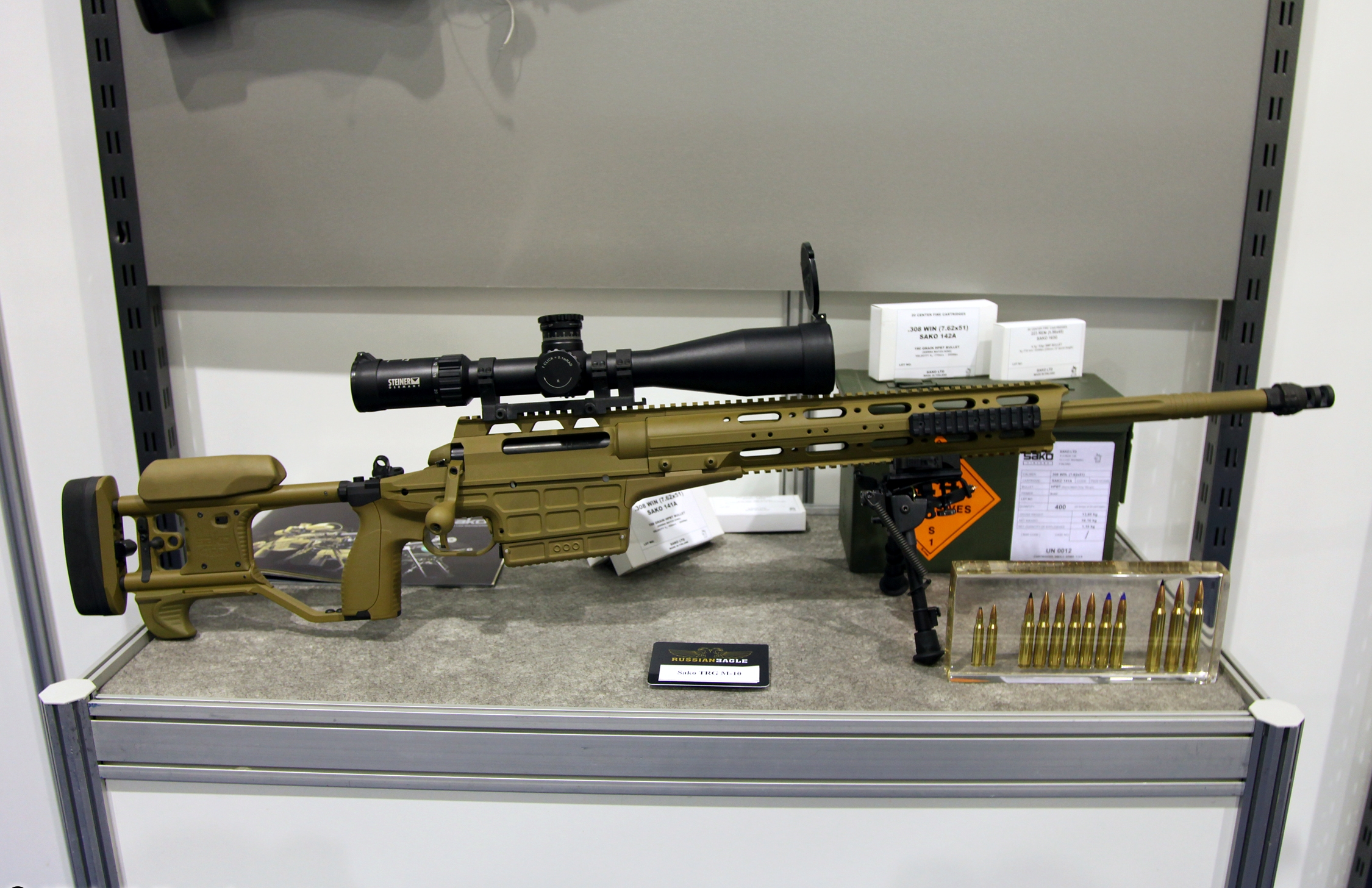
Sako TRG M10 Sniper Weapon System (coyote brown surface finish)

The Sako TRG M10 Sniper Weapon System was unveiled by Sako in October 2011. It was designed as a user configurable modular system and does not share its receiver and other technical features with the preceding models in the Sako TRG line. It can switch between .308 Winchester (7.62×51mm NATO), .300 Winchester Magnum and .338 Lapua Magnum chamberings by changing the bolts, magazines, forends and barrels, to adapt to various requirements in the field. When it was first introduced, it was marketed for "military and law enforcement only".

It was entered as a contender for the Precision Sniper Rifle program by the United States Special Operations Command to replace all current bolt-action sniper rifles in use by U.S. special operations snipers with a single bolt-action rifle chambered for a large calibre magnum chambering. The contract was awarded to Remington Arms for their Modular Sniper Rifle winning against the TRG M10 in 2013.

The TRG M10 is a manually operated bolt action sniper rifle that uses a rotary bolt with three radial locking lugs at the front. It features a steel receiver, a Picatinny rail on top of its receiver for mounting various optical sights and on the stock bottom for bipod mounting. The barrel is a free floating barrel that can be equipped with special muzzle brakes that have a mounting interface for quick detachable suppressors. It is offered in various barrel lengths of 16-, 20- and 26-inch for the .308 Winchester (7.62×51mm NATO), 23.5- and 27-inch for the .300 Winchester Magnum, and 20- and 27-inch for the .338 Lapua Magnum. Ammunition feeding is by a double-stack detachable box magazine which is marked with appropriate number of large dots that are embossed into the sides of the polymer baseplate and that holds 11 rounds of .308 Winchester (7.62×51mm NATO), 7 rounds of .300 Winchester Magnum, or 8 rounds of .338 Lapua Magnum. Alternatively, cartridges can be singly loaded directly into the chamber.

The TRG M10 has a side-folding and fully adjustable buttstock, featuring an aluminium middle chassis frame, side-folding buttstock, and a fore-end with the M-LOK rail interface system that allows for direct accessory attachment onto "negative space" (hollow slot) mounting points, ambidextrous controls, a manual safety that is located inside the trigger guard which is in front of the trigger, and uniquely designed tactical indicators which helps identify different modular components for different calibres, where every calibre-depending component is specially marked so users can recognise the calibre of each part visually or by touch. For example, for the .308 Winchester barrel and bolt are marked with single annual grove, whereas for the .300 Winchester Magnum are marked with two groves and three for the .338 Lapua Magnum. Another unique feature of the rifle is that all of the tools that are necessary to change the calibre are built into each of the bolt handle; the small torx key is built into the centre of the bolt knob and the barrel wrench is integrated into the base of the bolt handle. An additional set of Torx keys are stored inside a small detachable polymer forend, which are necessary for full disassembly of the gun.

Sako states that the TRG M10 factory acceptance tests with high quality match ammunition has an accuracy of 1 MOA (0.291 mil) for .338 Lapua Magnum and .300 Winchester Magnum chambered models and two-thirds MOA (0.194 mil) for .308 Winchester chambered models.

A 2019 TRG M10 spare parts catalologue offered accessories in black or coyote brown coloured surface finishes and accessories for using the 6.5mm Creedmoor and .300 Norma Magnum chamberings.

The available 2024 TRG M10 chambering palette is:

- 6.5 Creedmoor, .260 Remington, .308 Winchester / 7.62×51mm NATO
- .300 Winchester Magnum
- .300 Norma Magnum, .338 Norma Magnum, .338 Lapua Magnum

== Users ==
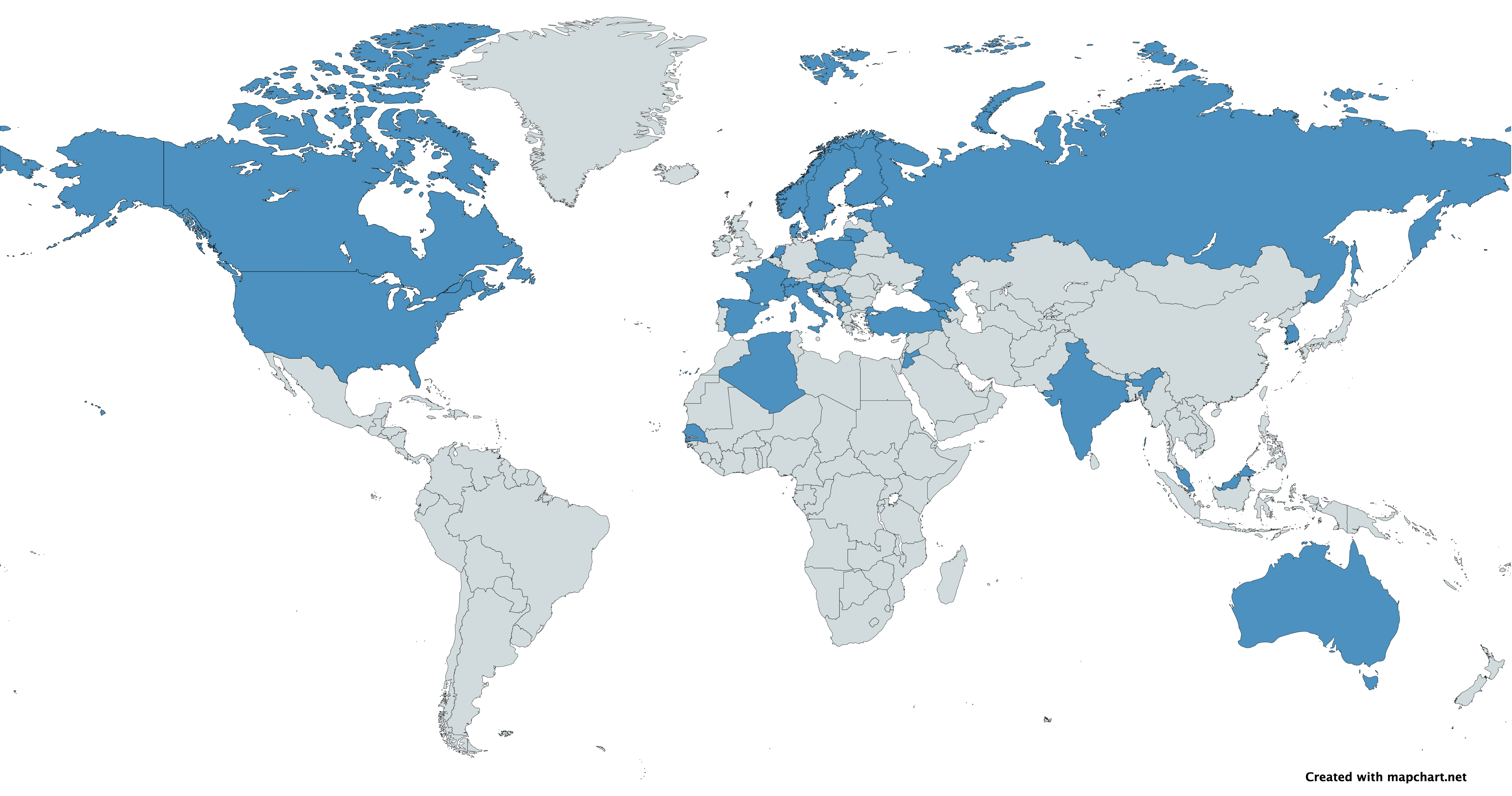
Map with Sako TRG users in blue

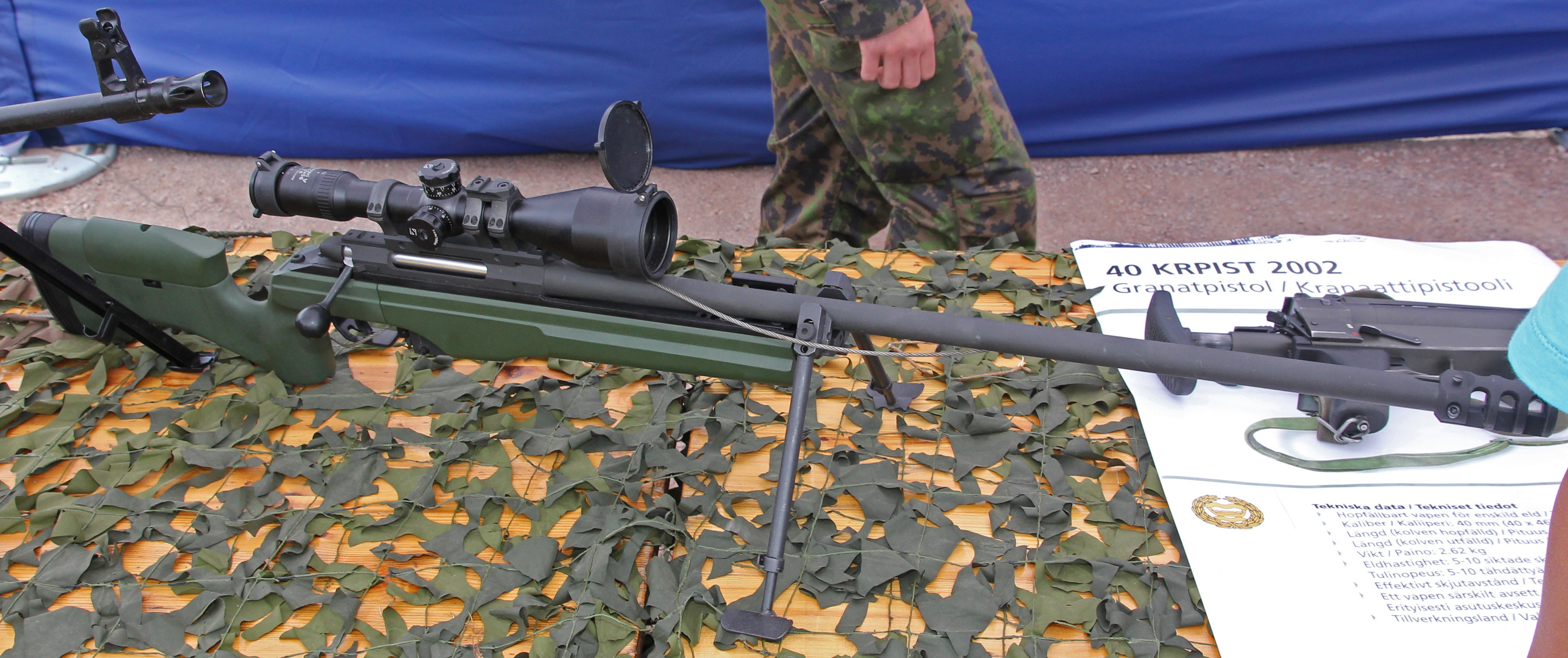
Finnish Defence Forces 8.6 TKIV 2000 Sniper Rifle (TRG-42 chambered in .338 Lapua Magnum)

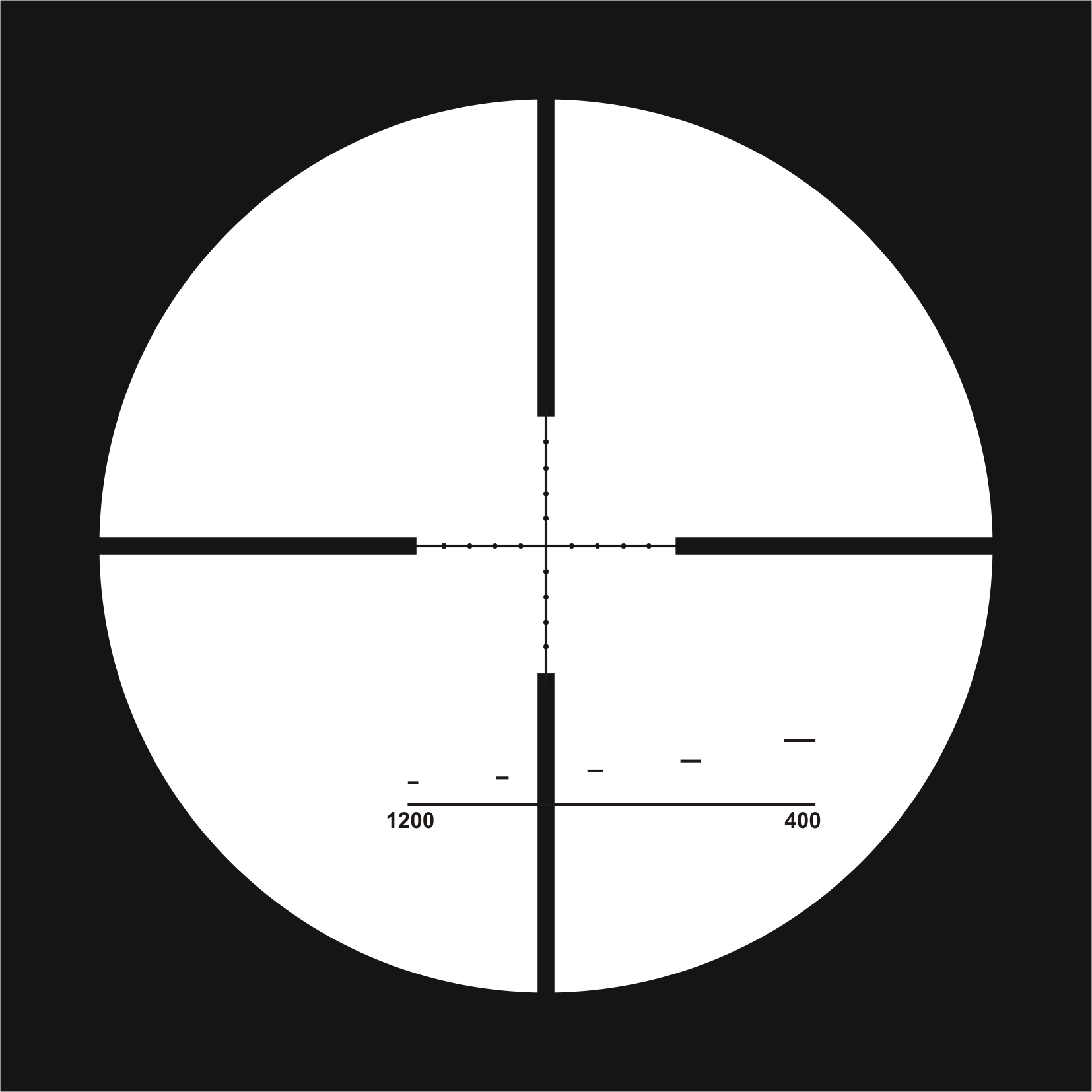
"FinnDot" reticle

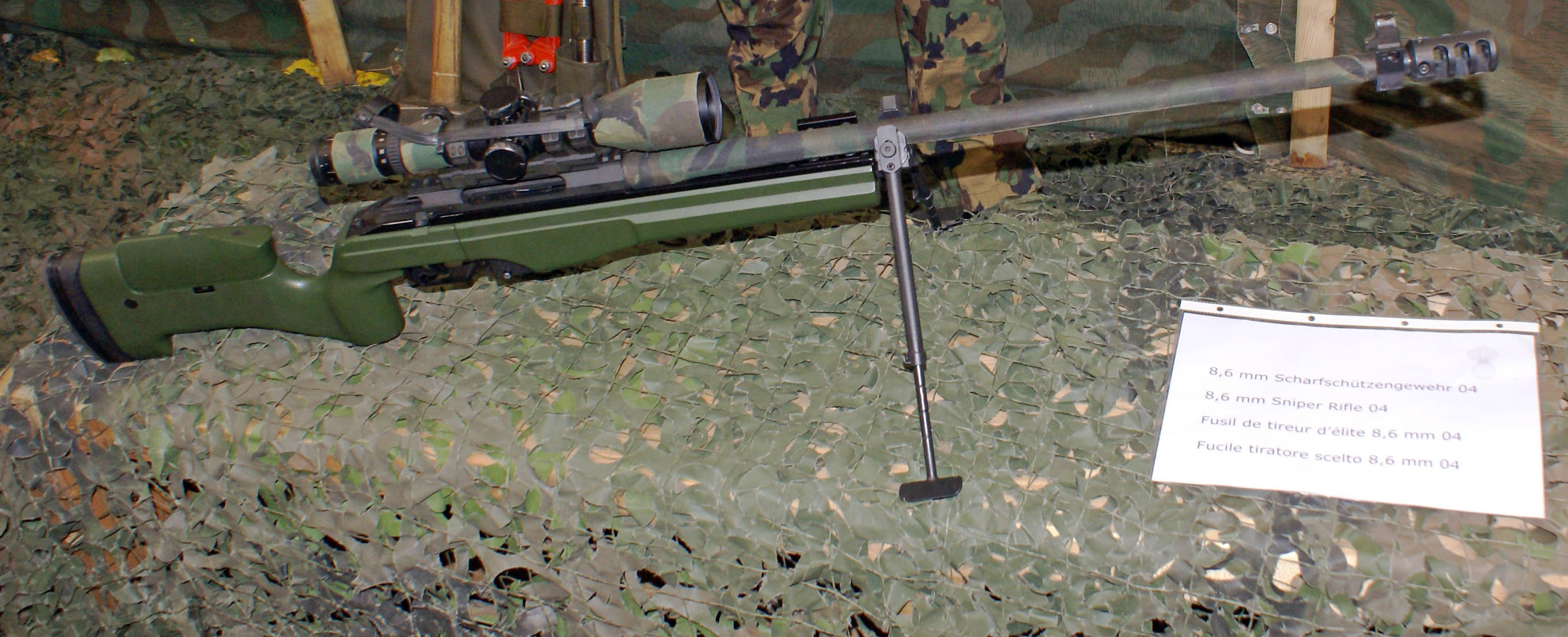
Swiss Army 8.6 mm Sniper Rifle 04 (TRG-42 chambered in .338 Lapua Magnum)

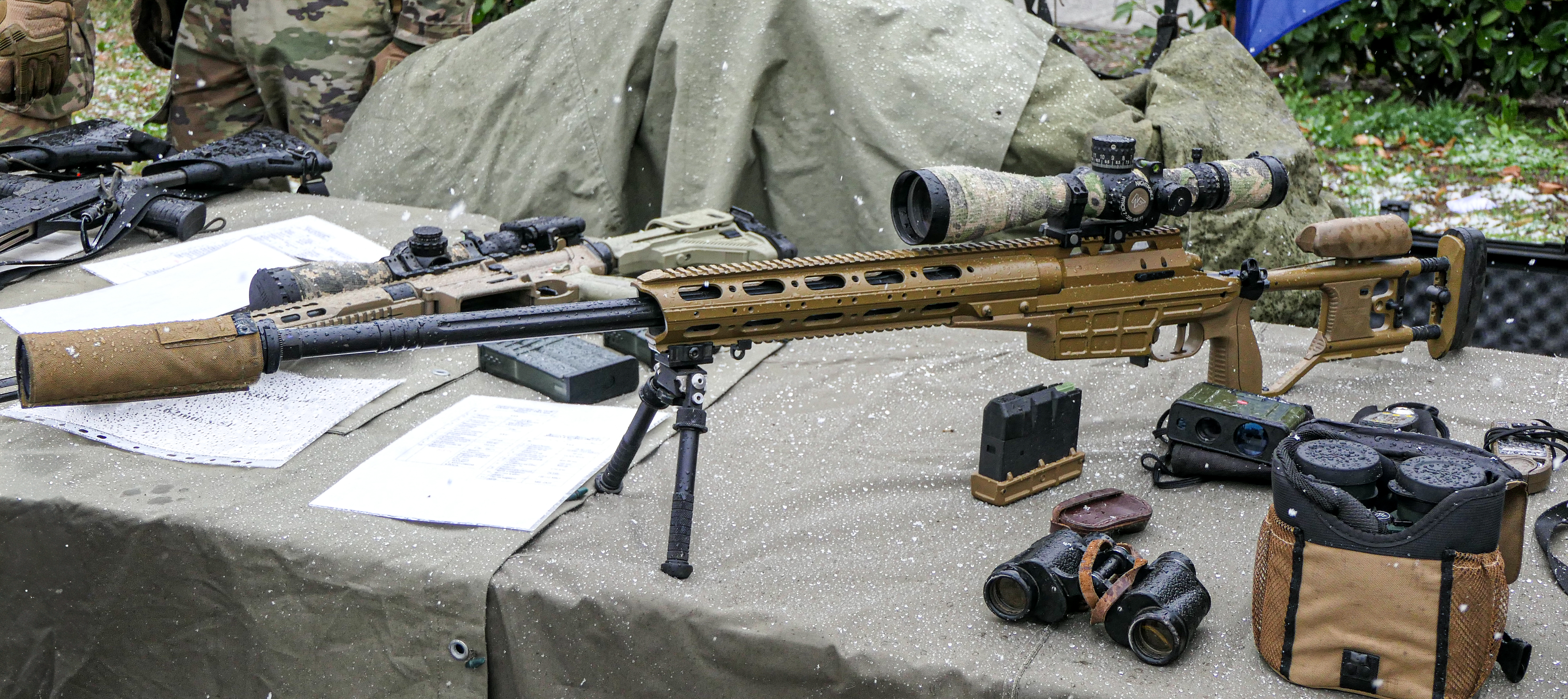
Sako TRG M10 used by the Bulgarian Special Forces

Country	Variant	Number	Notes
Albania	TRG-42 TRG M10		Used by the RENEA & Albanian Land Force.
Australia	TRG M10		The TRG M10 sniper rifle was trialed by the Army's 2nd Commando Regiment in 2014.
Armenia	TRG-42		The TRG-42 sniper rifle is used by Army Special Forces.
Bulgaria	TRG M10		The TRG M10 is in use with the Joint Special Operations Command.
Canada	TRG M10	229	In 2022, the Canadian Armed Forces selected the Sako TRG M10 Sniper Weapon System to be their new C21 sniper rifle. C21 MCSW (Multi-Caliber Sniper Weapon) users can switch between the 7.62×51mm NATO and .338 Lapua Magnum chamberings.
Czech Republic	TRG-22		The TRG-22 sniper rifle is in use with the Czech armed forces. They are issued with the Leupold & Stevens VX-3 6.5-20×50 or Schmidt & Bender 4-16×50 PM II sights, and a Harris BRMS 6-9 or OEM Sako TRG Bipod.
Croatia	TRG-42		The TRG-42 sniper rifle chambered in .300 Winchester Magnum is in use by the Croatian Army and special forces.
Denmark	TRG-42		Jægerkorpset, Frømandskorpset, Særlig Støtte- og Rekognosceringskompagni and regular army snipers are issued with the TRG-42 sniper rifle with a folding stock. It is known as the Finskyttegevær M/04.
Estonia	TRG-42 TRG M10	? 70+	The special forces and sniper units of the Estonian Defence Forces use the TRG-42 sniper rifle. Estonian 1st and 2nd Infantry brigade and Estonian Defence League will receive TRG M10 sniper rifles by 2024 M10s chambered in 8.6mm.
Finland	TRG-42 M10	490	The Finnish Army purchased 490 TRG-42 sniper rifles. It is known as the 8.6 TKIV 2000. The Finnish Defence Forces (FDF) 8.6 TKIV 2000 rifles have custom-made Zeiss 3-12×56 Diavari VM/V T* 30 mm telescopic sights with eye safe laser filters mounted. These sights are equipped with first focal plane "FinnDot" reticles (a regular mil-dot reticle with the addition of holdover (stadiametric) rangefinding brackets for 1 metre high or 0.5 metre wide targets at 400, 600, 800, 1,000 and 1,200 m). Reticle illumination is provided by a tritium ampule embedded in the elevation turret. The elevation turrets have 100–1,400 m Bullet Drop Compensation (BDC) knobs calibrated for the Lapua Lock Base B408 cartridges the FDF issues its TKIV 2000 marksmen. FDF snipers are trained to compensate BDC-induced errors that inevitably occur when the environmental and meteorological circumstances deviate from the circumstances the BDC was calibrated for. The reticle elevation has 0.25 mil (0.25 mrad) adjustment intervals (total elevation range = 18.6 mils), while the windage has 0.1 mil adjustment intervals. The FDF believes 0.25 mil elevation intervals are easier and quicker to use with Arctic mittens and that the difference between 0.1 and 0.25 mil adjustment intervals is negligible for anti-personnel sniping (0.1 mil at 1,400 m = 14 cm (0.3437747 MOA), 0.25 mil at 1,400 m = 35 cm (0.8594367 MOA)). All vital screw slots are designed to be operated with the rim of .338 Lapua Magnum cartridges instead of screwdrivers.
France	TRG-42		The TRG-42 sniper rifle is used by the Commandos Parachutiste de l'Air (CPA) 10 /20 /30 with Schmidt & Bender scopes.
India	TRG-22 Sako TRG 42		Indian Army The TRG-22 sniper rifle is used by Mizoram Armed Police in very small numbers. Sako TRG 42 is used by the Indian Army.
Indonesia	TRG M10		The TRG M10 sniper rifles is used by the Amphibious Reconnaissance Battalion of the Indonesian Navy.
Italy	TRG-42		The TRG-42 sniper rifles is used by the 9th Parachute Assault Regiment "Col Moschin", Guardia di Finanza and the Gruppo di Intervento Speciale.
Georgia	TRG M10; TRG-22; TRG-42		Used by GSOC, SSPS CAT and law enforcement special units.
Jordan	TRG-22; TRG-42		The TRG-22 and TRG-42 sniper rifles are used by Jordanian Royal Special Forces SRR-61 (Special Reconnaissance Regiment).
Lithuania	TRG-22		The TRG-22 sniper rifle is used by the Lithuanian Armed Forces.
Malaysia	TRG-22		The TRG-22 sniper rifle is used by the Grup Gerak Khas.
Netherlands	TRG-41 TRG M10		TRG M10 is used by the Dienst Speciale Interventies (Special Intervention Service). An elite police unit consisting of members of the military, tasked with counterterrorism and arresting high-risk suspects.
Norway	TRG-42		The TRG-42 sniper rifle is used by the HJK/FSK(Airborne special forces) and Marinejegerkommandoen (Naval special forces) in small numbers.
Poland	TRG-21; TRG-22; TRG-42; TRG M10	40; 206; 50; 150	The Polish Armed Forces operate a total of 40 TRG-21 and 206 TRG-22 sniper rifles, with 150 TRG M10 on order. The very first TRG-21 units delivered were used by the Policja, GROM and the 1st Special Commando Regiment. The remaining 30 TRG-21s were introduced mainly into the 6th Airborne Brigade as well as the 25th Air Assault Brigade. For operational needs in Iraq, 130 TRG-22 were ordered in 2004. In 2006 the TRG-22 was also chosen by the Żandarmeria Wojskowa. Policja use TRG-42. 150 TRG M10 were ordered by Polish Land Forces in 2016.
Portugal	TRG-22		Used by Núcleo de Operações Táticas de Proteção (NOTP, Core of Tactical Operations of Protection) of the Portuguese Air Force.
Russia	TRG-42		Used by the Special Rapid Response Unit (SOBR), FSB.
Serbia	TRG-22; TRG-42		The TRG-22 and TRG-42 sniper rifles are used by Serbian Armed Forces and Police.
Slovenia	TRG M10		Used by the Specialna Enota Policije (SEP/Red Panthers) - Police Counter-Terrorism Unit
Senegal	TRG-42		Used by Senegalese commandos.
Singapore	TRG-22		Used by the Singaporean Army commandos.
South Korea	TRG M10		Used by the Republic of Korea Navy Special Warfare Flotilla
Spain	TRG-21; TRG-22; TRG-41; TRG-42		The TRG-22 and TRG-42 sniper rifles are used by some police forces in Spain. The TRG-22 is also used by the Special Intervention Group of the Catalan Police. and the TRG-21 and TRG-41 sniper rifles are used by the Grupo Especial de Operaciones (GEO) of the Cuerpo Nacional de Policía.
Sweden	TRG-42 M10		The TRG-42 is used by the Flygbasjägarna (Air Force Rangers), Fallskärmsjägarna, Kustjägarna and Särskilda operationsgruppen. It is known as the Prickskyttegevär 08.
Switzerland	TRG-42	196	196 TRG-42 sniper rifles. It is known as the SSGw 04 (Scharfschützengewehr 04).
Turkey	TRG-42	350	350 TRG-42 sniper rifles are acquired.
Ukraine	TRG-22		The TRG-22 sniper rifle is used by the Alpha Group and the "Omega" special forces units.
Kazakhstan	TRG M10		The TRG M10 sniper rifle is used by Kazakh military marksmen during the international “Sharp Blade 2025” sniper competition held in Xinjiang, China, Photos published on the official event news site show Kazakh military participants using the Sako TRG M10 sniper rifle fitted with a NightForce riflescope. In the third image, a team member wearing black can be seen with the Kazakh flag on his right arm and the word “Kazakhstan” on his cap, further confirming their national affiliation.Notably, Kazakhstan also participated in the 2023 competition, where their snipers used the same Sako TRG M10 platform with a Steiner optic.
USA	TRG M10		The TRG M10 is used by the NYPD Emergency Service Unit

== See also ==
- Accuracy International Arctic Warfare
- Accuracy International AWM
- PGM Ultima Ratio
- PGM 338
- Bolt-action rifles
- List of firearms
- Rifles
- Sniper
- Sniper rifle

== External links and sources ==
- Official Sako TRG website
- uvson308.com TRG-42 black & green by Julien Cartier (image collection)
- uvson308.com TRG-42 vs. PGM .338 LM by Julien Cartier (image collection)
- Fortier, David M. (April 2002). "Sako's sniper: The TRG-22 precision rifle". Guns Magazine. 48 (4). Archived from the original on March 12, 2005 – via FindArticles.
- accurateshooter.com: Gun of the Week Collection, Week 69, A Tale of Two TRGs by Terje Fjørtoft
- Finland's Silenced .338 Long-Range Sniper: Sako TRG42 Rifle and BR-Tuote T8M Reflex Suppressor by Al Paulson
- Sako TRG-42 review: Guns & Ammo, April 2010
- Rifle Review SAKO TRG-22 at Sniper Central
- Rifle Review SAKO TRG-42 at Sniper Central
