= .500 Jeffery =

Big-game rifle cartridge

- Type: Rifle
- Place of origin: England

Production history
- Designer: August Schuler
- Designed: ~1920

Specifications
- Case type: Rebated, bottleneck
- Bullet diameter: .510 in (13.0 mm)
- Neck diameter: .538 in (13.7 mm)
- Shoulder diameter: .607 in (15.4 mm)
- Base diameter: .619 in (15.7 mm)
- Rim diameter: .575 in (14.6 mm)
- Rim thickness: .052 in (1.3 mm)
- Case length: 2.75 in (70 mm)
- Overall length: 3.46 in (88 mm)
- Case capacity: 158 gr H_{2}O (10.2 cm^{3})
- Rifling twist: 1 in 17.7 in (450 mm)
- Primer type: Large rifle magnum

Ballistic performance
Bullet mass/type	Velocity	Energy
570 gr (37 g) Soft nose (BC: .368)	2,200 ft/s (670 m/s)	6,127 ft⋅lbf (8,307 J)
570 gr (37 g) Barnes TSX	2,507 ft/s (764 m/s)	7,957 ft⋅lbf (10,788 J)
535 gr (35 g) SP	2,549 ft/s (777 m/s)	7,721 ft⋅lbf (10,468 J)
600 gr (39 g) PP	2,468 ft/s (752 m/s)	8,117 ft⋅lbf (11,005 J)
465 gr (30 g) Lehigh solid	2,551 ft/s (778 m/s)	6,721 ft⋅lbf (9,112 J)
- Test barrel length: 24 in (610 mm); Source: Norma Ammunition RealGuns reloading data

The .500 Jeffery (12.7×70mmRB) is a big-game rifle cartridge that first appeared around 1920, and was originally introduced by the August Schuler Company, a German firm, under the European designation "12.7×70mm Schuler" or ".500 Schuler". When offered by the famed British outfitter W. J. Jeffery & Co., it was renamed the .500 Jeffery so as to be more palatable to British hunters and sportsmen following World War One.

== History ==
The .500 Jeffery was introduced to bring firepower comparable to the .505 Gibbs into a standard-sized 1898 Mauser action as used with the 8x57mm and 7x57mm cartridges. The Gibbs and .416 Rigby cartridges required oversized magnum Mauser actions. To shoehorn a large round into the 98 action required a rebated rim. When introduced, the .500 Jeffery was technically rated as the most powerful rifle cartridge although in reality not quite up to .505 Gibbs' performance. The .505 Gibbs, with greater capacity, can be loaded far in excess of the .500 Jeffery today.

== Ammunition availability ==
Like the .505 Gibbs, the .500 Jeffery is enjoying somewhat of a renaissance among American shooters and African big game hunters in the early 21st century, almost 100 years after its introduction. As of 2009, Norma, Kynoch, Mauser, Corbon, and Westley Richards were offering loaded ammunition in .500 Jeffery with ammunition costing $150 for a box of 20 or more.

== Rifles ==
There have been a few rifles chambered in the .500 Jeffery including Jeffery, Heym, CZ-USA, and a few single shots including the Ruger No. 1, and the Butch Searcy & Co. Mauser offers its Model 98 magnum in the caliber. Its "elephant" model is offered in .500 Jeffery exclusively. In 2011, Sako began offering the caliber in its Model 85 "safari" rifle using a new XL size action, and since 2014 the XL action has been available in the more affordable Model 85 brown bear rifle. Blaser also offers rifles chambered in the caliber. Many of the modern rifles have feeding issues due to the rebated rim. The original Jeffery uses a single-column two-shot magazine to get around the potential reliability problems resulting from a rebated rim.

== Criticism ==
The .500 Jeffery has had a few issues since its introduction. It has a rather short neck length that can make it difficult to seat bullets with a relatively high sectional density. Also it has a small shoulder. This is not usually an issue but as the .500 Jeffery also has a rebated rim it makes it rather difficult to extract in extreme conditions.

== Ballistics ==
When the .500 Jeffery was first introduced it was loaded to a velocity of 2,350 feet per second (720 m/s) with a 535-grain bullet generating 6,560 ft⋅lbf (8,890 J) of muzzle energy. Since then, reloading capabilities have changed to be able to launch heavier bullets at higher velocities. With modern reloads, the .500 Jeffery can launch a 600-grain bullet at a muzzle velocity ranging from 2,450 to 2,500 ft/s (750 to 760 m/s), generating 7,995 ft⋅lbf (10,840 J) to 8,100 ft⋅lbf (11,000 J).

== See also ==
- .50 BMG
- .500 A-Square
- .500 Nitro Express
- .577 Nitro Express
- .577 Tyrannosaur
- .600 Nitro Express
- .700 Nitro Express
- List of rebated rim cartridges
