= Hartmann & Weiss =

Hartmann & Weiss GmbH
- Company type: GmbH
- Industry: Firearms
- Founded: 1965; 61 years ago
- Headquarters: Hamburg, Germany
- Key people: Gerhard Hartmann, Otto Weiss
- Products: Shotguns, Double Rifles, Bolt Action Rifles, Falling Block Rifles, Single Barrel Break-Down Rifles
- Website: www.hartmannandweiss.com

Hartmann & Weiss GmbH (H&W) is a Hamburg-based custom sporting firearms maker founded in 1965. They make sporting arms, including shotguns, over and under, falling-block single rifles, and bolt-action rifles based on Mauser 98 and several other modern actions. They have produced small numbers of double rifles, in calibers from .375 H&H to the .600 Nitro Express.

== History ==
Otto Weiss was a gunsmith who worked at Merkel in East Germany before fleeing that country in 1958 for England, where he initially worked at Purdey's. Five years later he relocated to Hamburg, then in West Germany, to work with Gerhard Hartmann as a custom gunsmith. In 1964, he and Hartmann founded the company. Three years later, an associate named Peter Nelson established a second location in England.
