= Remington MSR =

- Type: Sniper rifle
- Place of origin: United States

Service history
- In service: 2013 – c. 2020
- Used by: See Users
- Wars: Global War On Terror

Production history
- Manufacturer: Remington Arms
- Unit cost: $15,000
- Produced: 2009–present
- No. built: 5,150 planned

Specifications (22" barrel)
- Mass: 13 lb (5.9 kg) (base rifle); 17 lb (7.7 kg) (complete)
- Length: 36 in (91 cm) (stock folded); 46 in (120 cm) (stock extended)
- Barrel length: 20 in (51 cm) 22 in (56 cm); 24 in (61 cm) 27 in (69 cm)
- Cartridge: .338 Lapua Magnum; .338 Norma Magnum; .300 Winchester Magnum; 7.62×51mm NATO
- Action: Bolt-action
- Muzzle velocity: 1,002 m/s (3,290 ft/s) (.338LM); 938 m/s (3,080 ft/s) (.300WM); 890 m/s (2,900 ft/s) (.338NM); 841 m/s (2,760 ft/s) (7.62 NATO)
- Effective firing range: 1,500 m (1,640 yd) (varies on cartridge)
- Feed system: Detachable box magazine: 5 or 10 rounds (.338 Norma/Lapua, 7.62 NATO); 7 rounds (.300 Win Mag)
- Sights: Schmidt & Bender 5–25×56 PMII; Leupold & Stevens Mark 4

The Modular Sniper Rifle, or MSR, is a bolt-action sniper rifle developed and produced by Remington Arms for the United States Army. It was introduced in 2009, and was designed to meet specific United States Army and USSOCOM Precision Sniper Rifle requirements. The MSR initially won the PSR competition, and was called the Remington Mk 21 Precision Sniper Rifle in U.S. military service. However, it was then decided that the Mk 21 did not conform to SOCOM requirements at the time in 2018, and the program was re-competed with the Barrett MRAD selected in 2019 as the Mk 22 Advanced Sniper Rifle solution.

== History ==
On 7 March 2013, MSR was declared the winner of the Precision Sniper Rifle competition. Remington announced that the MSR had won on March 8, and it was publicly confirmed on March 9. This was followed by a $79.7 million contract for 5,150 rifles with suppressors, along with 4,696,800 rounds of ammunition to be supplied over the next ten years. The contract was awarded on 12 September 2013. Remington Defense produces the sniper rifles and utilizes two other companies for other system components, with Barnes Bullets for ammunition and Advanced Armament Corporation for muzzle brakes and suppressors; all three companies are subsidiaries of Freedom Group Incorporated.

In 2015, the U.S. Army was considering the PSR to replace both the .300 Winchester Magnum M2010 Enhanced Sniper Rifle and the .50 BMG M107 Long Range Sniper Rifle for regular snipers, although no decision has been made. The U.S. Marine Corps was also considering the Mk 21 to replace their M40A5 sniper rifle, but is unlikely to adopt the Mk 21 due to the higher cost of the system, particularly the ammunition, as compared to the 7.62mm NATO M40A5.

== Design ==
The Remington MSR is a manually operated bolt-action weapon with a rotary locking bolt. To facilitate caliber change, the bolt is equipped with removable bolt heads, with bolt faces matched for appropriate calibers. Bolt heads have three radial locking lugs. The MSR rifle is built upon an aluminum alloy "chassis", which hosts a compact receiver, adjustable trigger unit, pistol grip, and fully adjustable side-folding buttstock. The quick-change barrels are free-floated inside the tubular handguard which is provided with a number of user-installable Picatinny type accessory rails. The top of the receiver also is fitted with a monolithic Picatinny rail used to install sighting equipment (telescope sights or night vision sights). Additional equipment includes a detachable folding bipod and a quick-detachable suppressor which installs over the specially designed muzzle brake.

The model that won the PSR competition is a modified version of the original MSR. It can be chambered in 7.62×51mm NATO, .300 Winchester Magnum, and .338 Lapua Magnum. It is reported to have 0.7 MOA average accuracy at 1,000 m (1,094 yd) with both Barnes and ATK 300 gr (19.4 g) .338 Lapua Magnum ammunition.

Changes to the PSR version include:

- Reinforced AAC muzzle brake for Titan QD suppressor
- Chromoly steel .338 barrel with 1:9.5 twist, 5R rifling, and Melonite (ferritic nitrocarburized) finish
- One piece handguard with 20 MOA top rail
- Barrel nut accessible without removing the handguard
- X-treme trigger
- Light weight, removable buttstock with throw lever adjustments instead of ratcheting adjustments

On 14 August 2014, the Army announced it was seeking sources to produce .338 Lapua armor-piercing (AP) ammunition for use in the Mk 21 PSR to effectively engage targets out to 1,500 m (1,640 yd). The main objective is for the rifle to defeat level IV body armor at 400 meters, whether suppressed or unsuppressed, in temperature ranges of −65 to 160 °F (−54 to 71 °C). Other minimum requirements include a projectile velocity of 1,340 ft/s (410 m/s) or more at 1,250 m (1,367 yd), 1,000 ft⋅lb (1,356 J) of kinetic energy at 1,500 m (1,640 yd), and the ability to defeat both 3/8 in (9.5 mm) of rolled homogeneous armor (RHA) and 1/2 in (12.7 mm) of cast iron at 800 m (875 yd).

== Users ==
- United States: USSOCOM, first winner of the Precision Sniper Rifle competition, later excluded due to non-compliance
- Colombia: National Army of Colombia, used by Colombian Special Forces

== See also ==
- Precision Sniper Rifle
