= .338 Xtreme =

Rifle cartridge

Production history
- Manufacturer: Xtreme Machining
- Produced: 2008-Present

Specifications
- Parent case: .505 Gibbs
- Overall length: 3.030 in
- Case capacity: 161 to 167.5

The .338 Xtreme cartridge (or .338 XT for short), is based on a necked down .505 Gibbs cartridge case with a sharper 35 degree shoulder angle. Introduced in 2008 by Xtreme Machining of Grassflat, Pa, the cases, commercially produced by Bertram Bullets, have a length of 3.030" and a head diameter of 0.640". Case capacity is 167.5 grains. Factory loads drive a 266 grain bullet at 3350 feet per second from a 30" barrel. The factory loads are loaded with a Tellurium Copper alloy solid very-low-drag bullet, These projectiles are manufactured by Xtreme Machining and of a patent pending design.

The secant ogive projectile measures 1.808" long, including a 6 degree boat tail of 0.285". The patent refers to a "dual diameter" aspect of the projectile, where the main cylindrical portion of the bullet measures 0.331", 0.001" greater than the lands of the rifling. About 1.440" from the tip, the diameter increases to 0.338", creating a 0.15" "driving band". This both reduces driving force required for the high muzzle velocity as well as improves accuracy.

The .338 Xtreme possesses a full 50% more case capacity than a .338 Lapua Magnum cartridge, but it drives a projectile with a claimed G1 ballistic coefficient of 0.825 of like mass at only 10–12% more velocity from a similar length barrel when measured at the muzzle. Casual observers might conclude that the cartridge is overbore, but the ballistics tables tell a different story. Between 1000 and 2000 yards, the normal operating envelope for extreme long range shooting, the .338 Xtreme demonstrates 50% higher velocity, is 50% flatter shooting, and maintains more than double the energy of C.I.P. conform with .338 Lapua Magnum loads with conventional 250-grain very-low-drag bullets.

The external ballistic performance expectations of this .338 Xtreme load and non C.I.P.conform .338 Lapua Magnum based cartridges like the LM-105 wildcat cartridge utilizing the LM-105 projectile with a claimed G1 ballistic coefficient of ≈ 0.93 are similar.

A small production facility and single-source manufacturing affect availability of both the weapon and the ammunition components, so it is unlikely that the .338 Xtreme will be adopted as a military cartridge.
