= PGM Ultima Ratio =

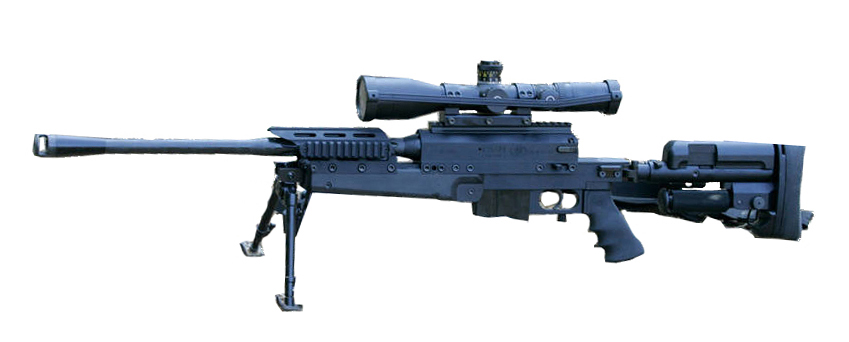
- PGM Ultima Ratio Commando of the Slovenian Army
- Type: Sniper rifle
- Place of origin: France

Service history
- In service: 2000–present
- Used by: See Users

Production history
- Manufacturer: PGM Précision
- Variants: Intervention; Commando I; Commando II; Integral Silencieux

Specifications
- Mass: 7.39 kg (16.29 lb) (Intervention); 6.26 kg (13.8 lb) (Commando I); 6.12 kg (13.5 lb) (Commando II); 7.08 kg (15.6 lb) (Integral Silencieux)
- Length: 1,158 mm (45.6 in) (Intervention, extended stock); 873 mm (34.4 in) (Intervention, stock folded)
- Barrel length: 600 mm (23.6 in) (Intervention); 550 mm (21.7 in) (Commando I); 470 mm (18.5 in) (Commando II); 400 mm (15.7 in) (Integral Silencieux)
- Cartridge: 7.62×51mm NATO; .300 Savage; 7mm-08 Remington; .260 Remington; 6.5mm Creedmoor; 6.5×47mm Lapua; 6mm Norma BR
- Action: Bolt-action
- Effective firing range: 800 m (875 yd) (7.62×51mm NATO)
- Feed system: 5 or 10-round detachable box magazine
- Sights: Optical sights Backup iron sights (accessory)

The PGM Ultima Ratio is a French sniper rifle. It uses the 7.62×51mm NATO cartridge but depending on the barrel variant can also be chambered for several other cartridges. The PGM Ultima Ratio is intended to fulfill an anti-personnel role and is produced by PGM Précision of France. Its main commercial competitors/equivalents on the high-end factory sniper rifle market are the Accuracy International Arctic Warfare and Sako TRG product lines. All of these rifles are similar in performance.

The name "Ultima Ratio" derives from the Latin expression ultima ratio regum ("the final argument of kings"), which Louis XIV had engraved on his cannons.

== Design details ==
The Ultima Ratio system is almost unique in being a purpose-designed sniper rifle, rather than an accurised version of an existing, general-purpose rifle.

Like its larger brothers – the PGM Hécate II (chambered in .50 BMG) and PGM 338 (chambered in .338 Lapua Magnum) – the PGM Ultima Ratio is structured around a central rigid metal girder chassis, giving it a skeletal "barebones" appearance to minimize weight and simplify maintenance.

The receiver is made from a high quality 7075 aircraft-grade aluminum alloy, while the steel bolt has three lugs that lock into a barrel extension. It also has overpressure vent holes allowing high-pressure gases a channel of escape in the rare event of a cartridge case head failure. The match grade barrel is mounted fully floated and can be easily exchanged in the field with the help of a 5 mm hex key.

There are several barrel configurations available. The Intervention barrel sports heating dispersion ribs along its length and an integrated glued on muzzle brake to reduce recoil, jump and flash. The Commando I and Commando II barrels are fluted and can have integrated or detachable muzzle brakes. If the barrels are threaded for a detachable muzzle brake they can also be fitted with a detachable suppressor. The Integral Silencieux barrel has an integrated suppressor.

The 7.62×51mm NATO and .300 Savage barrels feature a 305 mm (1:12 in) right-hand twist rate. The twist rate for the other standard chamberings are; 7mm-08 Remington 241 mm (9.5 in), .260 Remington 229 mm (9 in), and 6.5×47mm Lapua 203 mm (8 in). The Intervention barrels are available in all the chamberings mentioned above. The Commando I and II barrels are available in 7.62×51mm NATO and 7mm-08 Remington, whilst the Integral Silencieux barrels are available in 7.62×51mm NATO and .300 Savage.

The furniture (pistol grip and forearm) is made from a polymer material and is mounted to the frame. The buttstock is made from metal and has an adjustable shoulder pad for comfortable aiming and minimizing the effects of recoil on the operator. It is also adjustable for the length of pull and height, and in case of the folding stock variant can be folded to the left side of the receiver to reduce the overall dimensions of the rifle and make it more portable. An adjustable rear folding ground spike under the stock helps to keep the rifle in a stable position for extended periods of time and is most effective when coupled with the folding bipod support under the rifle barrel. A pistol grip is used for comfortable wielding of the weapon, especially during prolonged periods of time during which the operator must be immediately ready to open fire.

The Ultima Ratio has a fully adjustable two-stage trigger featuring an adjustable trigger pull weight of 10 N (2.2 lb_{f}) to 16 N (3.6 lb_{f}) that can be adjusted by an armourer and a fast lock time.

The PGM Ultima Ratio is fitted with a Picatinny rail so that it may be equipped with a wide range of commercial and NATO-standard optical sights, lights, night vision equipment and other tactical accessories. It also has an optional set of emergency iron sights to be used in case of the failure of the primary sight.

In order to preserve an optimal shooting comfort, the factory advises to avoid firing without the muzzle brake or silencer attached.

The PGM Ultima Ratio can consistently achieve an accuracy of about 0.5 MOA with match-grade ammunition when employed by a qualified marksman. The rifle can be used with a single row 5-round or double row 10-round box magazine.

Factory accessories are: PGM sound-suppressor, ergonomic wooden grip, wooden furniture, kit consisting of a long Picatinny rail and side Picatinny rails, PGM telescopic sight mounts, PGM back-up iron sights, transport case with formed foam and a carrying sling.

== Users ==
- Brazil: Used by the Marine Corps Special Operations Battalion, 1º Batalhão de Forças Especiais.
- France: Used by the Paris Search and Intervention Brigade in their Counter-Terrorism and Intervention scheme, RAID and the GIGN.
- Israel: Used by the Israeli special forces units, including the YAMAM - Israeli Police elite counter-terrorism unit.
- Lithuania: Used by the police counter-terrorist group ARAS.
- Morocco: Used by the Royal Moroccan Army.
- Slovenia: Slovenian Armed Forces.

== See also ==
- PGM 338
- PGM Hécate II
- Brügger & Thomet APR308 a Swiss sniper rifle that was developed based on the PGM sniper rifles.
