= List of equipment of the Singapore Army =

Singapore army weapons

This is the list of equipment of the Singapore Army, the land service branch of the Singapore Armed Forces (SAF). It is subdivided into infantry weapons, vehicles, unmanned aerial vehicles (UAVs), and radars.

== Vehicles ==
=== Armoured fighting vehicles ===
Model	Origin	Image	Type	Quantity	Notes	Ref
Main battle tanks
Leopard 2SG	Germany		Main battle tank	170+	Upgraded with AMAP Advanced Modular Armor Protection and AMAP-ADS active defence systems by IBD & ST Kinetics. Excludes 30 Leopard 2A4 as spare tanks, 20 Bergepanzer-3 Büffel armoured recovery vehicles and 10 AEV 3 Kodiak armoured engineering vehicles . SIPRI stated that Singapore received 45 units of the Leopard 2A7 version, which the government denied.	
Armoured fighting vehicles
Hunter AFV	Singapore		Armoured fighting vehicle	140	Germany delivered 140 engines for this vehicles, but actual number of AFVs produced is unknown. Production and operational model revealed in June 2019. More on order to replace M113 APC.	
Bionix II	Singapore		Infantry fighting vehicle	800	Variants include Bionix 40/50, Bionix 25.	
M113A2 Ultra IFV + M113A2 Ultra OWS	United States		Armoured weapons carrier	> 750	Originally an M113A1, upgraded to A2 standard. Each armed with 4 Igla anti-aircraft missiles (locally produced under license from KB Mashinostroyeniya Russia) with another 2 missiles stored as spares. Also used by the Republic of Singapore Air Force as SHORAD system.	
Armoured personnel carriers
Terrex AV-81	Singapore		Armoured combat vehicle	435		
Bronco All Terrain Tracked Carrier	Singapore		Amphibious tracked articulated vehicle	400		
Bandvagn 206	Sweden		Tracked articulated vehicle	300	Artillery versions mounted with ARTHUR.	
Peacekeeper PRV	France; Singapore		APC, MRAP	110	Local modified version of the Renault Higuard (MRAP). Replaced Cadillac Gage V-100/150/200.	
International MaxxPro Dash	United States		APC, MRAP	15	Deployed in Afghanistan as part of NATO-led International Security Assistance Force.	
URO VAMTAC	Spain		Armoured car	N/A		
Armoured support vehicles
Belrex	South Africa; Singapore		Multi-role support vehicle, MRAP	122	Successor of G-class MB290 and 5-ton trucks. Local design based on Marauder mine-resistant, ambush-protected vehicle platform developed by South African firm Paramount Group. A variant mounting 120 mm mortar was commissioned in 2021. Variants: Combat engineer; Fuel; Logistics; Maintenance; Medical; Mortar; Mortar ammunition carrier; Security; Signal; Reconnaissance	
Special forces vehicles
Light Strike Vehicle	Singapore		Light strike vehicle	50	Can be configured with three variants: Automatic Grenade Launcher variant which uses the STK 40 AGL; Anti-Tank Guided Missile variant which uses the Spike missile system; General purpose variant which used the 7.62 General Purpose Machine Gun	
Mobile Adjustable Ramp System	United States		Light utility vehicle	N/A	Used as a custom-designed combat ambulance and the Mobile Adjustable Ramp System (MARS) variant by Patriot3 is used by the Special Operations Task Force (SOTF).	
Ford Everest Ops Utility Vehicle (OUV)	United States		Light utility vehicle	N/A		

=== Engineering vehicles ===
Model	Origin	Image	Type	Quantity	Notes	Ref
Recovery vehicles
Bergepanzer Büffel	Germany		ARV	20	Armoured recovery vehicle based on the Leopard 2A4 chassis.	
Hunter Recovery Vehicle	Singapore		ARV	20	Armoured recovery vehicle.	
Bionix ARV	Singapore		ARV	N/A		
Wheeled Recovery Vehicle (Miller / RMMV)	Germany; United States		Recovery wheeled vehicle	N/A	Successor of the MB 2636A Recovery Truck. 35-ton towing capacity. Miller Industries recovery system based on RMMV HX44M.	
Combat engineering equipment
AEV 3 Kodiak	Germany; Switzerland	Leopard 2 Armoured Engineer Vehicle	AEV	14	AEV based on the Leopard 2A4 chassis.	
FV180 Tractor	United Kingdom		AEV	36		
Bionix Trailblazer / Aardvark JSFU	United Kingdom; Singapore		Mine-clearing vehicle	N/A	Known locally as the Trailblazer Countermine Vehicle	
Bridging equipment
Panzerschnellbrücke Leguan	Germany		AVLB	10	Armoured vehicle-launched bridge based on the Leopard 2A4 chassis.	
MAN KAT1 LEGUAN MLC270	Germany		AVLB	N/A	Based on the MAN KAT1 truck.	
Bionix BLB	Singapore		AVLB	N/A		
M60 AVLB	United States		AVLB	12		
SM1 AVLB	France; Singapore		AVLB	N/A		
M3 Amphibious Rig	Germany		Amphibious float bridges	N/A		

=== Medical vehicles ===
Model	Origin	Image	Type	Quantity	Notes	Ref
Belrex Battalion Casualty Station Variant	South Africa; Singapore		MRAP rescue vehicle	N/A		
Mobile Swab Station	United States		Medical vehicle	N/A	F550-based platform	

=== Utility and logistics vehicles ===
Model	Origin	Image	Type	Quantity	Notes	Ref
Utility vehicles
Agilis Light Utility Vehicle (LUV)	Singapore		Light utility vehicle	N/A		
Communications vehicles
Rheinmetall MAN TG-MIL Digitised Trunk Communication System	Germany			N/A	Used by Signals Formation for high bandwidth Digitised Trunk Communication System	

== Indirect fire ==
=== Artillery systems ===
Model	Origin	Image	Type	Calibre	Quantity	Notes	Ref
Rocket artillery
M142 HIMARS	United States		Rocket artillery	227 mm (GMLRS)	24	516 missiles purchased initially. Purchase of 45 pods M30A2 GMLRS-AW in 2026. Upgrade with Common Fire Control System upgrade kits in 2026.	
Artillery
SSPH-1 Primus	Singapore		Self-propelled artillery	155mm L/39	48		
SIGMA	Israel		Wheeled self-propelled artillery	155mm L/52	N/A	Introduced in 2026.	
SLWH Pegasus	Singapore		Towed howitzer	155mm L/39	60		
FH-2000	Singapore		Towed howitzer	155mm L/52	17		
Ordnance QF 25-pounder	United Kingdom		Ceremonial gun-howitzer	87.5mm	12	Used in gun salutes.	
Mortars
Bronco MTC; ST Engineering SRAMS	Singapore		Mortar carrier	120mm	N/A		
Belrex PCSV; ST Engineering SRAMS Mk2	South Africa; Singapore		Mortar carrier	120mm	N/A		
Soltam M-65	Israel		Towed heavy mortar	120mm	N/A		
Indirect fire support
Belrex PCSV	South Africa; Singapore		Mortar ammunition carrier, MRAP	–	N/A		

=== Surveillance systems ===
==== Radars ====
Model	Origin	Image	Type	Quantity	Notes	Ref
AN/TPQ-36 Firefinder	United States		X-band (IEEE), PESA, counter-battery radar / weapon locating radar	20	Radar towed by a Ford pick-up.	
AN/TPQ-37 Firefinder	United States		S-band (IEEE), PESA, counter-battery radar / weapon locating radar	20	Large trailer radar system.	
AN/TPQ-53 Weapon Locating Radar	United States		S-band (IEEE), AESA, GaN, counter-battery radar / weapon locating radar	N/A		
Elta Systems ELM-2311 SAFARI	Israel		C-band (IEEE), AESA, GaN, counter-battery radar / weapon locating radar	N/A	Radar installed on the trailer of the Bronco ATTC and the command post in the cabin of the Bronco.	
ARTHUR	Sweden; Norway		C-band (IEEE), PESA, counter-battery radar / weapon locating radar	20	Radar installed on the trailer of the Hägglunds BV-206 and the command post in the cabin of the Bronco.	

==== Drones ====
Model	Origin	Image	Type	Role	Quantity	Notes	Ref
ST Aerospace Skyblade III	Singapore		Fixed-wing mini-UAV	ISTAR	80		
ST Aerospace Veloce 15	Singapore	ST Aerospace Veloce 15	Fixed-wing mini-UAV	ISTAR	N/A		

== Infantry equipment ==
=== Small arms ===
Model	Origin	Image	Variant	Type	Calibre	Notes	Ref
Pistols
SIG Sauer P226	Germany; Switzerland		P226 - West German model	Semi-automatic pistol	9×19mm Parabellum	Standard pistol of the Singapore Armed Forces. Being replaced by the P30.	
Heckler & Koch P30	Germany		P30L	Semi-automatic pistol	9×19mm Parabellum	Used by Army Deployment Force & Military Police formation to replace their legacy P226. Being phased in to replace the P226 for the rest of the Army.	
FN Five-seven	Belgium		Five-seven Tactical	Semi-automatic pistol	FN 5.7×28mm	Used by Special Operations Task Force.	
Submachine guns
Heckler & Koch MP5	Germany		MP5A3	Submachine gun	9×19mm Parabellum	MP5A3 modernised with RIS picatinny rails used by Special Operations Task Force. All variants used by Naval Diving Unit.	
Heckler & Koch MP5	Germany		MP5SD3	Submachine gun	9×19mm Parabellum	MP5A3 modernised with RIS picatinny rails used by Special Operations Task Force. All variants used by Naval Diving Unit.	
Heckler & Koch MP5	Germany		MP5K	Submachine gun	9×19mm Parabellum	MP5A3 modernised with RIS picatinny rails used by Special Operations Task Force. All variants used by Naval Diving Unit.	
Heckler & Koch MP5	Germany		MP5K-N	Submachine gun	9×19mm Parabellum	MP5A3 modernised with RIS picatinny rails used by Special Operations Task Force. All variants used by Naval Diving Unit.	
Heckler & Koch MP5	Germany		MP5K-PDW	Submachine gun	9×19mm Parabellum	MP5A3 modernised with RIS picatinny rails used by Special Operations Task Force. All variants used by Naval Diving Unit.	
Heckler & Koch MP7	Germany		MP7A1	PDW	HK 4.6x30mm	Used by Special Operations Force	
FN P90	Belgium		P90 TR	PDW	FN 5.7×28mm	Used by 1st Commando Battalion and Special Operations Force.	
Assault rifles
SAR 21	Singapore		–	Assault rifle	5.56×45mm NATO	Standard rifle of Singapore Armed Forces.	
BR18	Singapore		–	Assault rifle	5.56×45mm NATO	Currently undergoing trials. Planned to replace SAR-21 in the future.	
M4 carbine	United States		Colt M4/M16A2E	Carabine	5.56×45mm NATO	Early Colt M4 in service with the Naval Diving Unit and Special Operations Task Force.	
M16S1	United States; Singapore		M16S1	Assault rifle	5.56×45mm NATO	Produced under licence, a local variant of M16A1. Former standard issue used currently by reservist units.	
Heckler & Koch HK416	Germany		HK416A5	Assault rifle	5.56×45mm NATO	In service with the Special Operations Task Force.	
Precision rifles
KAC M110 Semi-Automatic Sniper System	United States		–	DMR	7.62×51mm NATO	Used as a DMR rifle by infantry formations and special forces units.	
Sako TRG-22	Finland		–	Bolt action sniper rifle	7.62×51mm NATO	Used by 1st Commando Battalion and Infantry formations	
Brügger & Thomet APR308	Switzerland		–	Bolt action sniper rifle	7.62×51mm NATO	Used by 1st Commando Battalion.	
Accuracy International AWM	United Kingdom		L115A1	Bolt action sniper rifle	7.62×67mmB (.300 Winchester Magnum)	Used by 1st Commando Battalion.	
Accuracy International AWM	United Kingdom		L115A1	Bolt action sniper rifle	8.6×70mm (.338 Lapua Magnum)	Used by 1st Commando Battalion.	
PGM Mini-Hecate	France		–	Bolt action sniper rifle	8.6×70mm (.338 Lapua Magnum)	Used by 1st Commando Battalion.	
Machine guns
Ultimax 100	Singapore		–	LMG	5.56×45mm NATO	Section Automatic Weapon formerly used by the Singapore Armed Forces.	
Colt IAR6940	United States		IAR6940E-SG	LMG	5.56×45mm NATO	Current Section Automatic Weapon of the Singapore Armed Forces.	
FN MAG	Belgium		–	GPMG	7.62×51mm NATO	Standard general-purpose machine gun of the Singapore Armed Forces.	
STK 50MG	Singapore		–	HMG	12.7×99mm NATO	Standard heavy machine gun of the Singapore Armed Forces.	
Hand grenades
SFG 87	Singapore		–	Fragmentation hand grenade	–	Standard anti-infantry grenade produced by ST Kinetics.	
Grenade launchers
M203	United States		–	Under-barrel grenade launcher	40×46mm LV	Either attached to M4 carbines or SAR21.	
STK 40 AGL	Singapore		–	AGL	40×53mm HV	Mounted on vehicles.	
Man-portable anti-tank systems
MATADOR (RGW90)	Singapore; Germany; Israel		–	Recoilless gun	90mm	Locally produced in Singapore by ST Engineering.	
Spike	Singapore; Israel		Spike MR	ATGM	152mm	Locally produced in Singapore by ST Engineering, under licensed from Rafael Advanced Defence System. 1,500 Spike-MR/LR purchased in 1999; another 500 Spike purchased in 2006.	
Spike	Singapore; Israel		Spike LR	ATGM	152mm	Locally produced in Singapore by ST Engineering, under licensed from Rafael Advanced Defence System. 1,500 Spike-MR/LR purchased in 1999; another 500 Spike purchased in 2006.	

=== Protection ===
Model	Origin	Image	Type	Note	Ref
FAST helmet	Singapore		Combat helmet	Current standard issue, also known as "New Army Helmet".	
PASGT	United States; Singapore		Body armour	Standard issue.	

=== Attire ===
Model	Pattern name	Pattern	Origin	Image	Notes	Ref
Uniform, Pixelised, Camouflage Pattern No. 4	Pixelised Camouflage No. 4 Green / Pixelised Camouflage No. 4 Arid		Singapore		Standard SAF uniform pattern. Digital pattern manufactured by Sritex (PT Sri Rejeki Isman Tbk).	
Crye Precision G3 Multicam-patterned Combat Uniforms and Crye Precision G4 Multicam-patterned Combat Uniforms	Multicam		United States		Used by the Special Operations Task Force (SOTF)	
Crye Precision G3 Multicam-patterned Combat Uniforms and Crye Precision G4 Multicam-patterned Combat Uniforms	Multicam Arid		United States		Used by the Special Operations Task Force (SOTF)	
Crye Precision G3 Multicam-patterned Combat Uniforms and Crye Precision G4 Multicam-patterned Combat Uniforms	Multicam Black		United States		Used by the Special Operations Task Force (SOTF)	
Crye Precision G3 Multicam-patterned Combat Uniforms and Crye Precision G4 Multicam-patterned Combat Uniforms	Multicam Tropic		United States		Used by the Special Operations Task Force (SOTF)	

== Retired equipment ==
Extended content
1. AMX-13SM1
2. AMX-10P 25 / PAC-90
3. Cadillac Gage Commando V-100/150/200
4. Light Strike Vehicle Mk.I
5. Soltam M-68 towed 155mm Howitzer
6. Soltam M-71S towed 155mm Howitzer
7. FH-88 towed 155mm Howitzer
8. M114A2 155mm Howitzer
9. M40A1 recoilless rifle
10. M2HB Browning Heavy Machine Gun
11. Enfield L1A1 Self-Loading Rifle
12. Soltam M-66 160mm Mortar
13. M728 CEV Combat Engineer Vehicle

== See also ==
- List of equipment of the Republic of Singapore Navy
- List of equipment of the Republic of Singapore Air Force
