= Bor rifle =

Bor
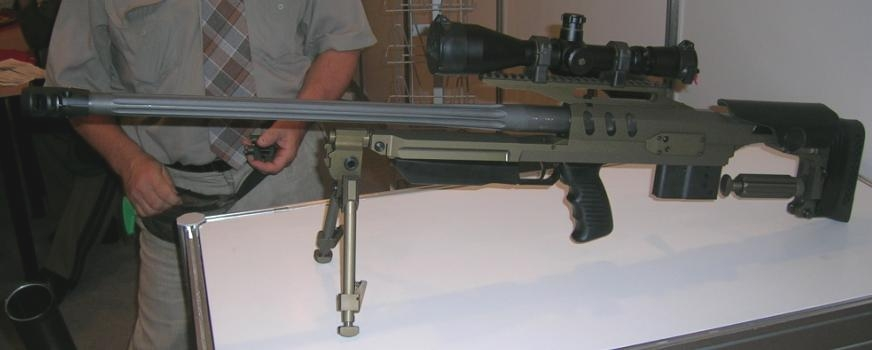
- The Bor sniper rifle fitted with a Leupold telescopic sight
- Type: Sniper rifle
- Place of origin: Poland

Service history
- In service: 2007–present
- Used by: Polish Army, Nigeria

Production history
- Designer: Aleksander Leżucha
- Designed: 2005
- Manufacturer: OBR SM Tarnów
- Produced: 2006–
- Variants: Alex Tactical Sport; Alex-338

Specifications
- Mass: 6.1 kg (13.45 lb)
- Length: 1,038 mm (40.9 in)
- Barrel length: 680 mm (26.8 in); 560 mm (22.0 in)
- Cartridge: 7.62×51mm NATO.338 Lapua Magnum
- Action: Bolt-action
- Muzzle velocity: 870 m/s (2,854 ft/s) (7.62 NATO)
- Effective firing range: 800 m (875 yd) (7.62 NATO)
- Feed system: 10-round detachable box magazine
- Sights: day or night optics, ZTOCS-1 ACRAB also Carl Zeiss Optronics NSV 80

The Bor is a Polish bolt-action 7.62×51mm NATO and .338 Lapua Magnum caliber sniper rifle. The weapon received the code name Alex during development, after the name of the lead designer Aleksander Leżucha, creator of the 12.7×99mm NATO Wilk anti-materiel rifle. After the development phase, the rifle received the military designation 'Bor'.

== Development ==
After 1999, when Poland became a member of the North Atlantic Treaty Organization, there was a need for new firearms for the Polish Armed Forces compatible with NATO standards. Starting in the early 2000s, at the Mechanical Equipment Research and Developing Centre (Ośrodek Badawczo Rozwojowy Sprzętu Mechanicznego – OBR SM) in Tarnów, engineer Aleksander Leżucha started his work on a new standard sniper rifle. The work on the Alex had financial backing of the Polish Science Research and Information Technology Ministry in a joint venture construction with the manufacturer OBR SM Tarnów. It is intended that this sniper rifle will ultimately replace all precision rifles of this caliber in Polish service (currently (2009) mostly SVD).

In the summer of 2005, testing of the new rifle began. The Bor was first unveiled at the 12th International Defense Industry Exhibition MSPO in September 2005 in Kielce. The weapon then went into production in 2006, when a short series was made.

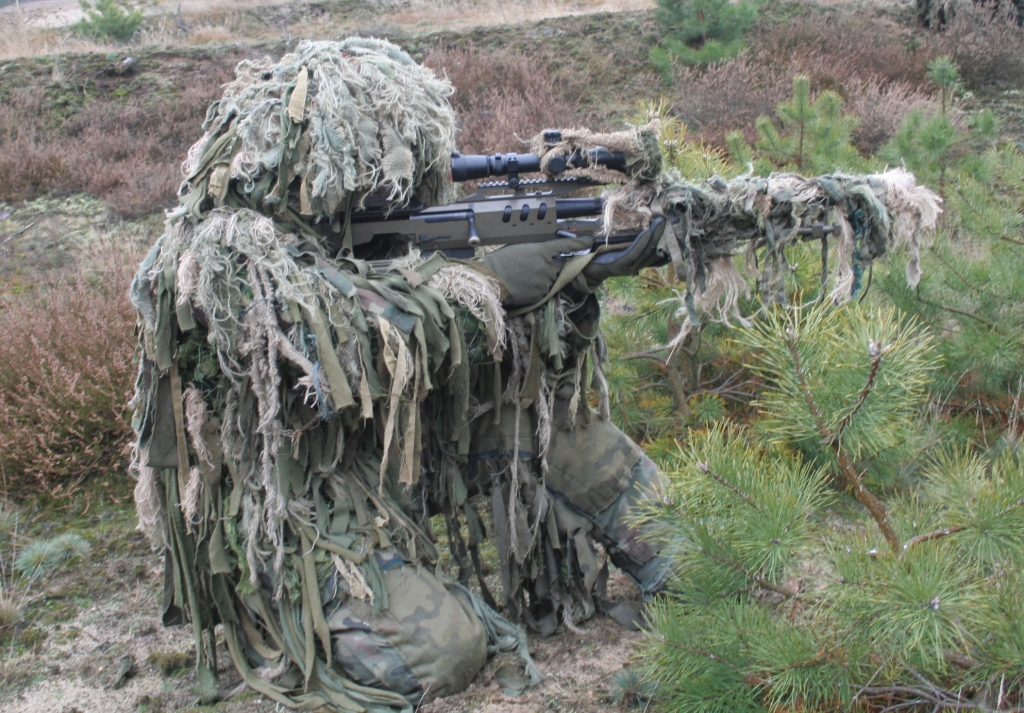
A sniper with a Bor rifle

In the spring of 2007 the 7.62 mm Bor had passed all the tests required to be introduced into Polish inventories. The Polish Armed Forces planned to acquire 36 Bor rifles in 2007. In 2008 the manufacturer received an order for the delivery of a batch of 81 Bor rifles chambered for the 7.62×51mm NATO cartridge by 2010.

In June 2011 the manufacturer received an order for the delivery of 55 modified Bor rifles chambered for the 7.62×51mm NATO cartridge by 2013. Several years of operations, including missions in Iraq and Afghanistan, has allowed to gain experience with the rifle. In accordance with the suggestions of users several improvements to the sniper weapon system were introduced including a 15 MOA forward canted Rail Integration System mounted over the receiver and a forward mounted tri-rail for mounting aiming optics and a new night vision device (Carl Zeiss Optronics NSV 80 Night Sight Attachment). Further the bipod, trigger, magazine well and bolt action were modified and the original barrel was exchanged for a new barrel with increased durability and corrosion resistance.

== Design details ==
The Bor is a bullpup-configuration bolt-action magazine-fed sniper rifle. The configuration provides increased accuracy by allowing a barrel length of 680 mm (26.8 in), but minimizes the overall length of 1,038 mm (40.9 in). Weight is further reduced without sacrificing accuracy by the use of a free-floating fluted barrel. The muzzle is fitted with a double-baffle muzzle brake, which is claimed to reduce recoil by up to 30%. The "in-line" design of the barrel-receiver group also directs recoil rearwards in a straight line, minimizing muzzle flip. A sturdy adjustable bipod is fitted to the front of the fore-end. The rifle features a fully adjustable buttstock and cheek riser. A folding/adjustable monopod located behind the magazine on the inside of the buttstock can be used to support the rifle in firing position during extended periods of deployment. No iron or emergency sights are provided; a MIL-STD-1913 Picatinny rail is mounted above the centerline of the barrel, over the receiver area for mounting various optical sights. The standard telescopic sight is a Leupold 4.5–14×50, with sight grid mil-dot reticle, parallax correction and an adjustment range of 100 MOA.

== Variants ==
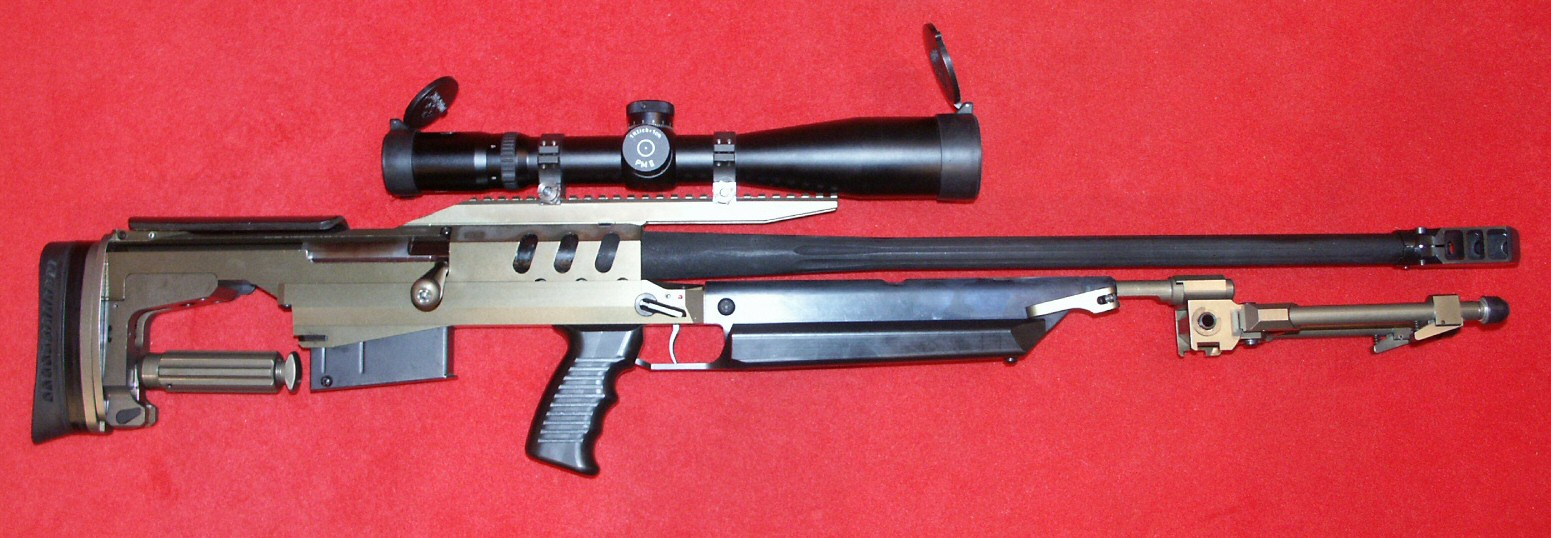
Alex-338 sniper rifle fitted with a Schmidt & Bender PM II telescopic sight.

=== Alex-338 prototype ===
Around 2007, OBRSM Tarnów has begun development of a .338 Lapua Magnum chambered model under the Alex-338 development designation (the manufacturer's code for the basic Alex/Bor was changed then to Alex-762). Early in 2008 the Mechanical Equipment Research and Developing Centre in Tarnów completed the design work and in June 2008 the first prototype was assembled. The model was publicly presented at the MSPO in Kielce, Poland in September 2008. The .338 Lapua Magnum version of the Bor is externally slightly different from the earlier 7.62 mm rifle . The lower assembly has a different shape. The Alex-338 weighs 6.5 kg without aiming optics and 7.3 kg with the standard Leupold telescopic sight mounted. It uses the same 5-round detachable box magazines as the Finnish Sako TRG-42 sniper rifle. Like the 7.62 mm Bor the Alex-338 shares some characteristics with the French PGM Précision PGM 338 rifles. The eventual introduction of weapons chambered for the specialized .338 Lapua Magnum rimless bottlenecked centerfire cartridge developed for military long-range sniper rifles will be a novelty in the Polish Armed Forces.

=== Alex Tactical Sport 308 Winchester ===
The Alex Tactical Sport .308 Winchester is a variant based on the Polish Armed Forces’ 7.62×51mm NATO Bor rifle. It is chambered for the .308 Winchester cartridge—which is very similar to the 7.62×51mm NATO cartridge—and is intended for the civilian market. As such, the Alex Tactical Sport has been adapted to meet the needs of sportsmen and law enforcement, with a simplified design that reduces the number of rifle components. The rifle weighs 5.3 kg, features a 660 mm barrel, and is fed by a double-stack 10-round box magazine. It was presented to the shooting public from 8–11 March 2013 at the IWA & OutdoorClassics fair in Nuremberg.

== Users ==
- Nigeria – unknown amount of Alex-338 rifle
- Poland – 196 examples of Alex rifle in use and 657 examples ordered.
