= PGM Hécate II =

Hécate II
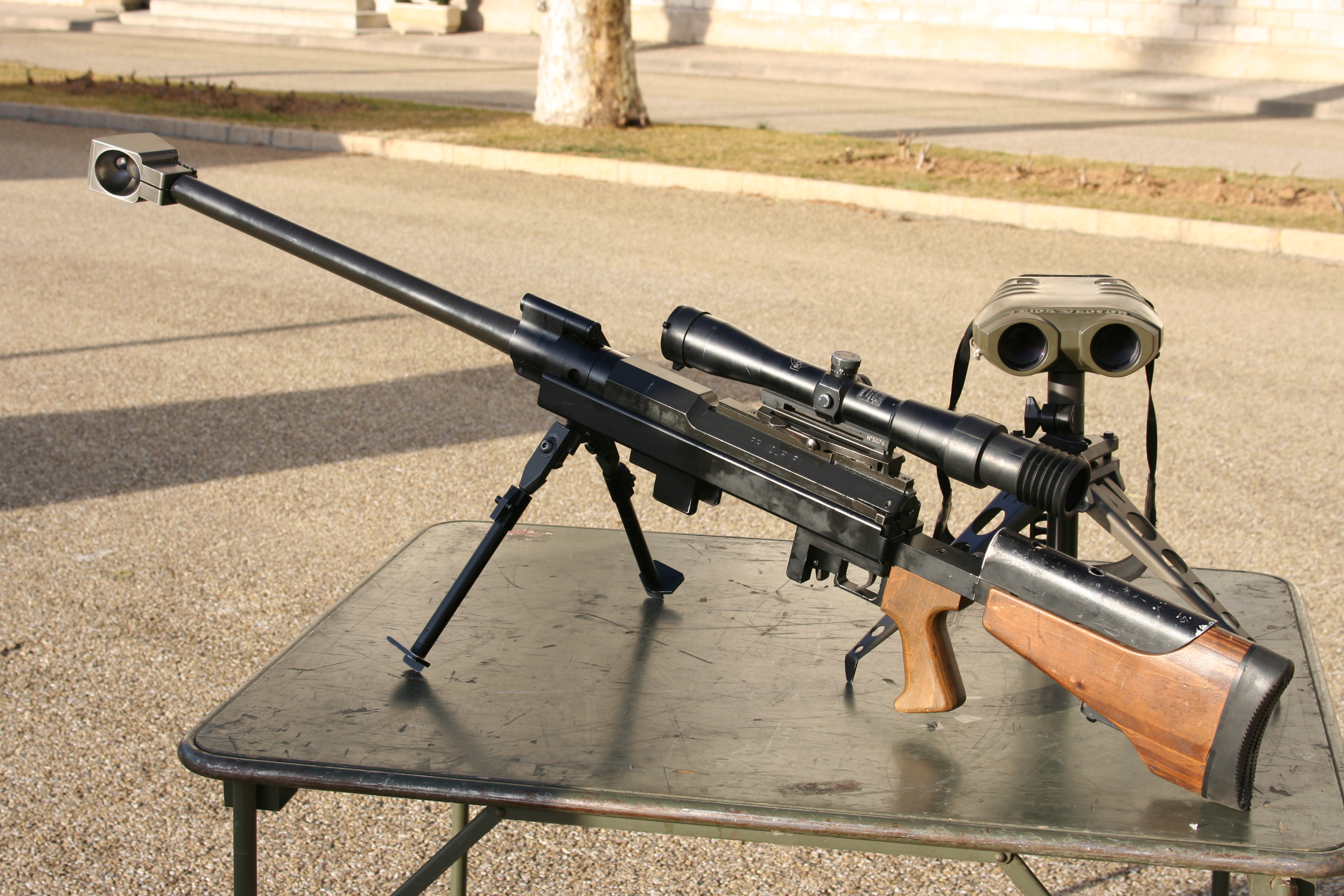
- The PGM Hécate II
- Type: Anti-materiel rifle
- Place of origin: France

Service history
- In service: 1993–present
- Used by: See Users
- Wars: War in Afghanistan; Northern Mali Conflict; Operation Serval

Production history
- Designer: Gilles Payen
- Manufacturer: PGM Précision

Specifications
- Mass: 13.8 kg (30.42 lb) with no sight
- Length: 1,380 mm (54.3 in); 1,140 mm (44.9 in) with stock removed
- Barrel length: 700 mm (27.6 in)
- Cartridge: .50 BMG (12.7×99mm NATO)
- Action: Bolt-action
- Muzzle velocity: 825 m/s (2,707 ft/s)
- Effective firing range: 1,800 m
- Maximum firing range: Over 2,000 m
- Feed system: 7-round detachable box magazine
- Sights: Telescopic sights

The Hécate II is the standard heavy sniper rifle and anti-materiel rifle of the French Army, sometimes known as the FR-12.7 (French: Fusil à Répétition de calibre 12.7 mm or "12.7 mm calibre repeating rifle"). It is manufactured by PGM Précision of France. This is the largest weapon manufactured by PGM, chambered for the .50 BMG (12.7×99mm NATO) cartridge. The name of the rifle is derived from the ancient Greek goddess Hecate.

== Design ==
Its design is the same metallic-skeleton as used in other similar rifles in the PGM family, only scaled up. The barrel of the Hécate is manufactured by FN Herstal and is lined with Stellite alloy which is also used for large calibre machine guns. This increases the barrel's longevity. It is fitted with a high-efficiency muzzle brake which reduces the felt recoil to about the level expected of a 7.62×51mm NATO-chambered rifle. The rifle is equipped with both an adjustable front bipod and a rear monopod for maximum accuracy. The stock is also adjustable. The Hecate II is a heavy firearm and weighs up to 16.00 kg (35.27 lb) at most.

The standard-issue sight used with the Hécate II is the SCROME LTE J10 F1 10× telescope.

== Users ==
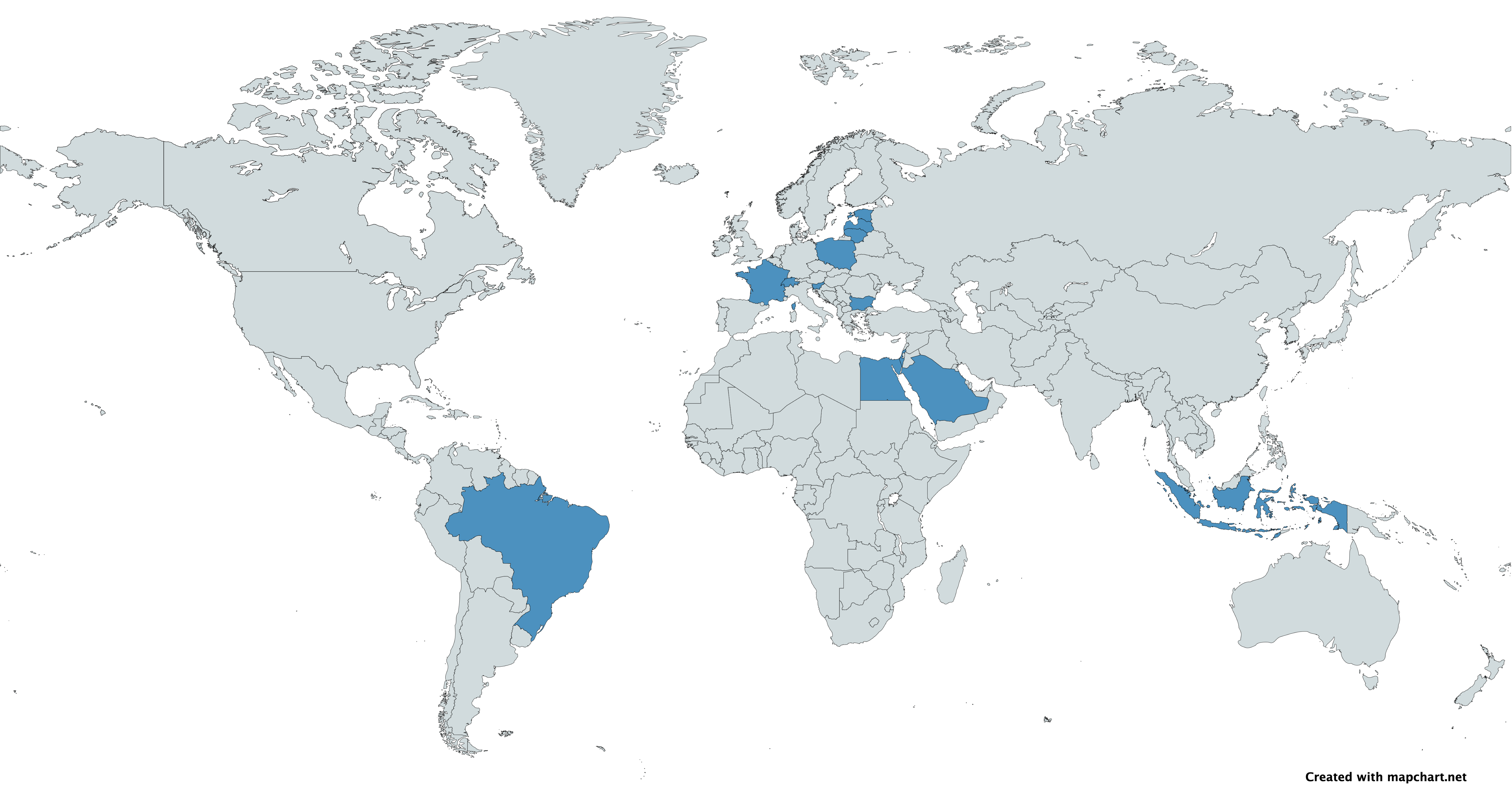
Map with PGM Hécate II users in blue

- Brazil: Marine Corps Special Operations Battalion
- Bulgaria - SOBT and SKSO
- Egypt – Used By Rapid Deployment Forces and Black Cobra
- Estonia
- France
- Indonesia
- Israel
- Latvia
- Lithuania
- Poland
- Saudi Arabia
- Slovenia
- Switzerland

== Gallery ==
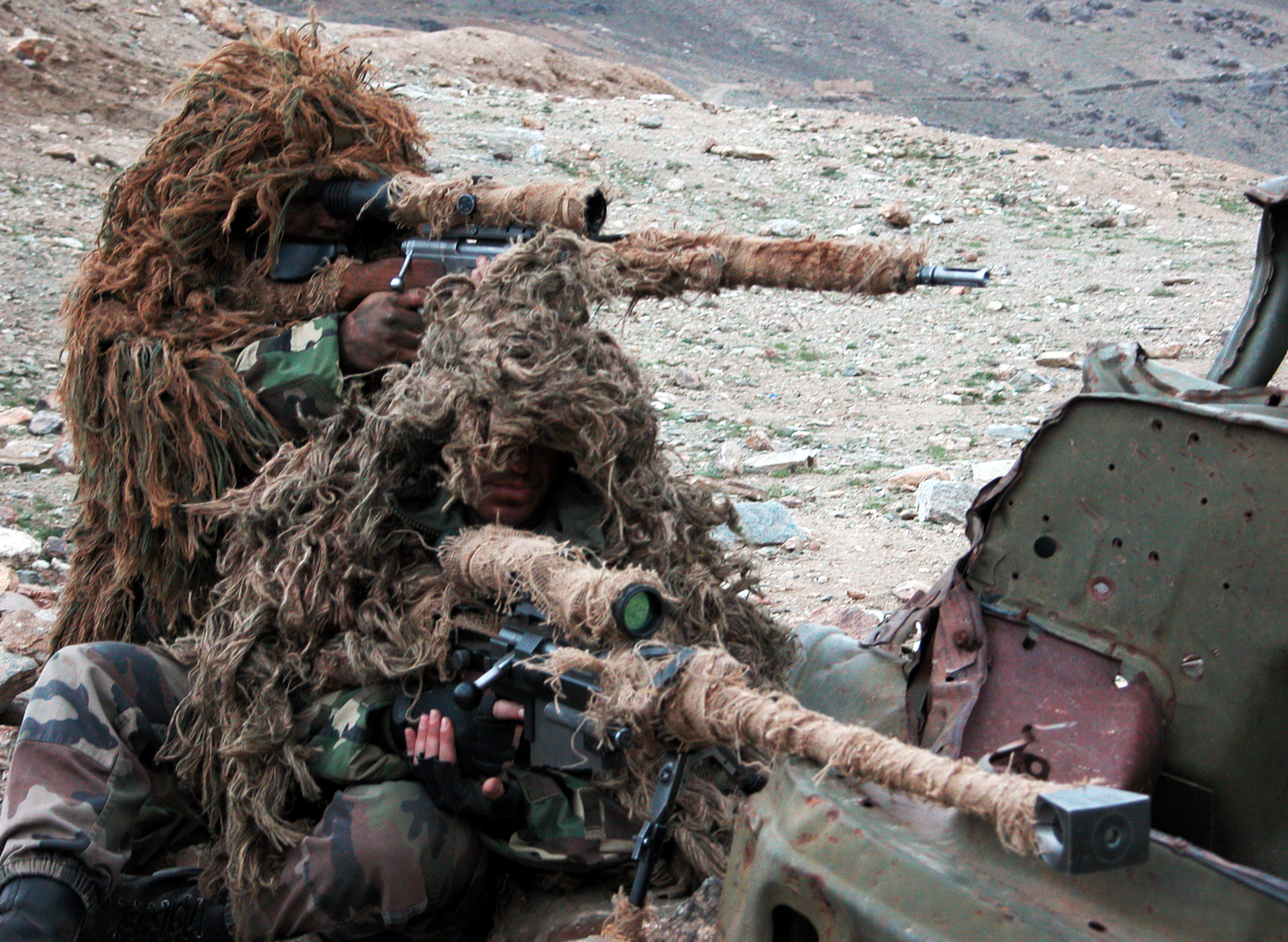
Snipers of the 2nd Foreign Parachute Regiment section de tireurs d'élite (Sniper) France deploying a PGM Hécate II and FR F2 in Afghanistan

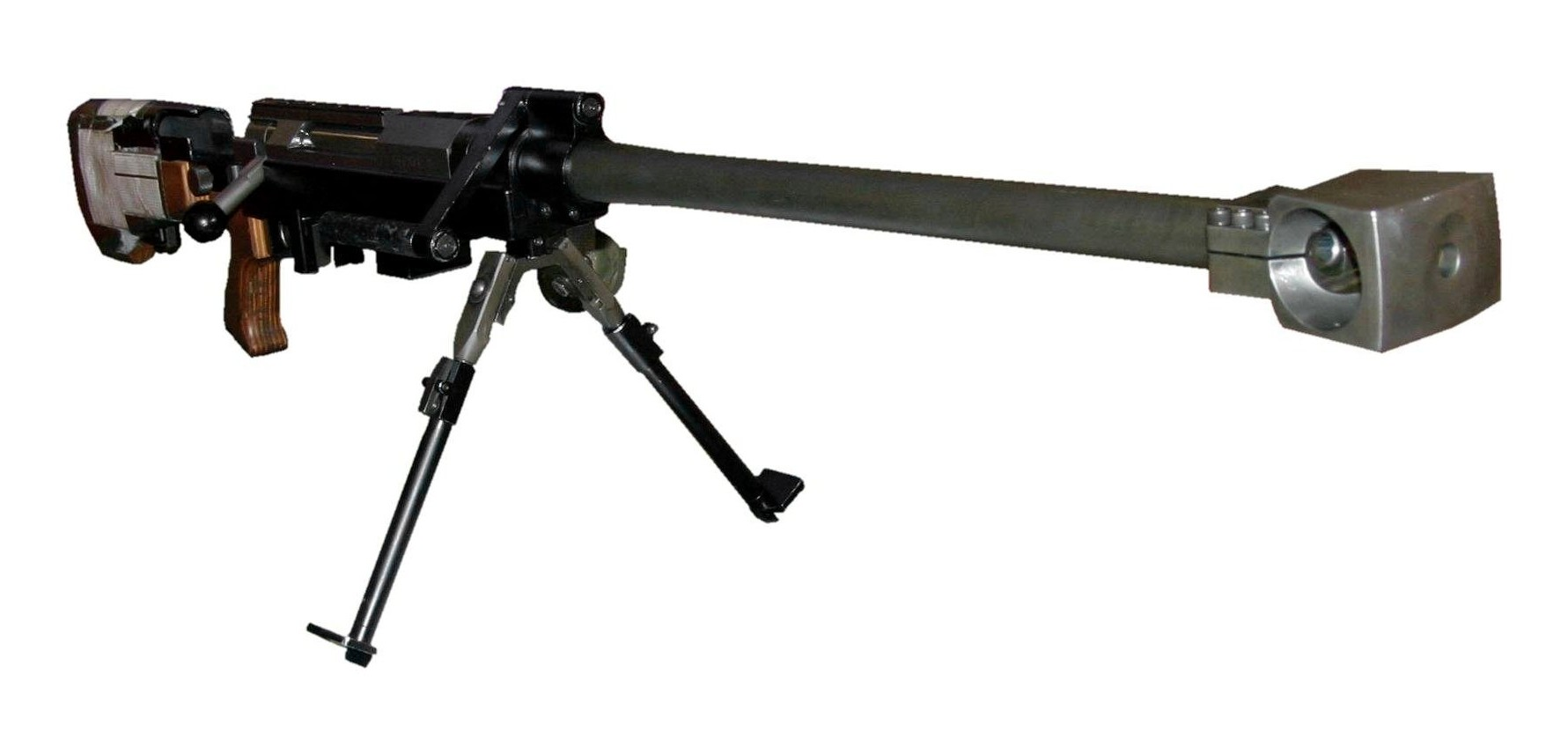
The distinctive muzzle brake on the PGM Hécate II

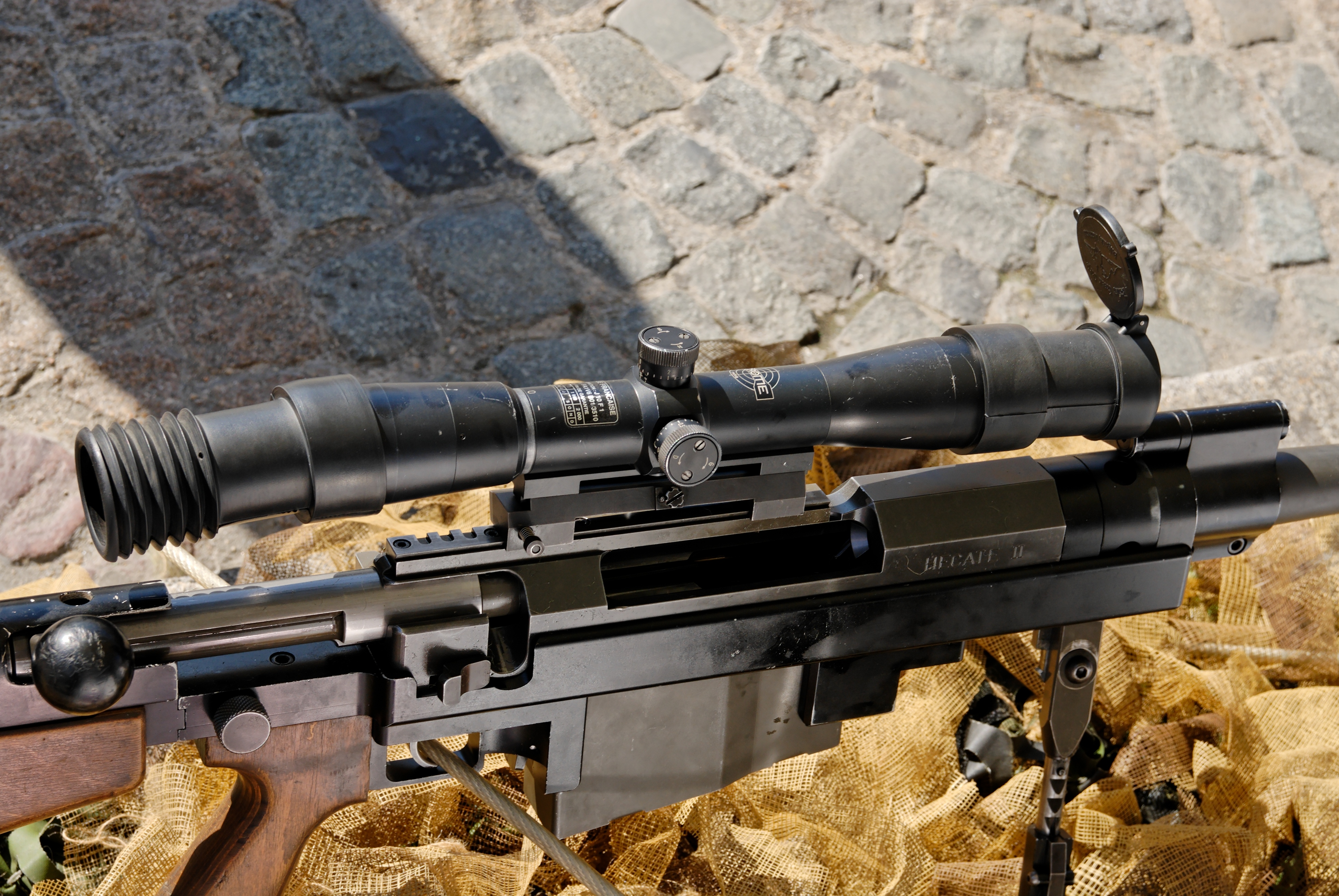
A PGM Hécate II with its standard issue scope in the French military, the Scrome LTE J10 F1

== See also ==
- FR F2
- PGM 338
- PGM Ultima Ratio
