= PGM 338 =

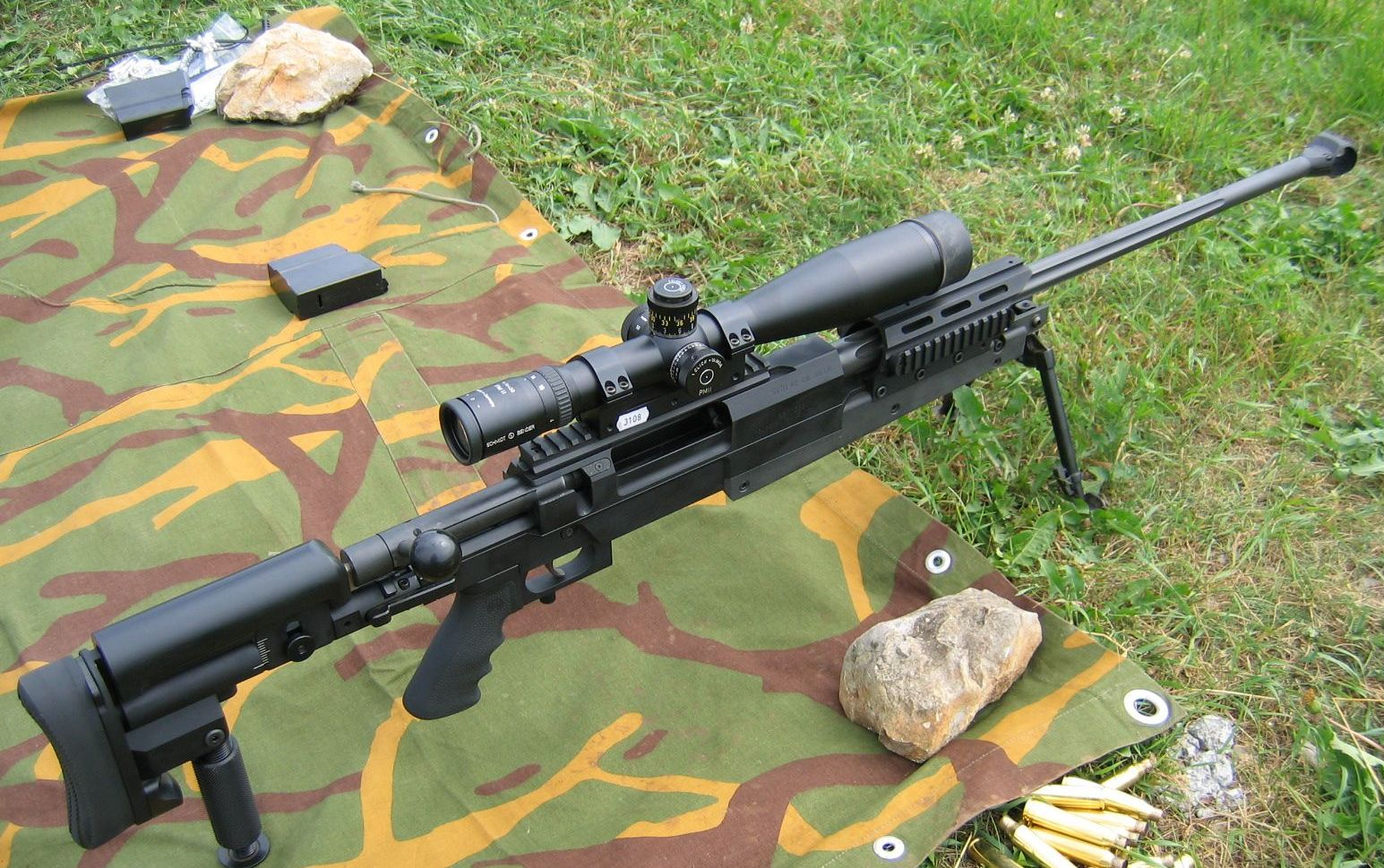
- The PGM 338
- Type: Sniper rifle
- Place of origin: France

Service history
- In service: 1993-present
- Used by: See Users

Production history
- Designer: Chris L. Movigliatti
- Manufacturer: PGM Précision
- Produced: 1993-present

Specifications
- Mass: 6.5 kg (14.33 lb); 7.3 kg (16 lb) folding stock version
- Length: 1,286 mm (50.6 in); 1,010 mm (39.8 in) stock folded
- Barrel length: 690 mm (27.2 in)
- Cartridge: .338 Lapua Magnum
- Action: Bolt-action
- Muzzle velocity: 900 m/s (2,953 ft/s)
- Effective firing range: 1400 m
- Feed system: 10-round detachable box magazine
- Sights: day or night optical sights back-up iron sights

The PGM 338, also known as the PGM .338 LM (LM - Lapua Magnum) or PGM Mini-Hecate .338, is a French sniper rifle from the early 1990s (being produced since 1993). It uses the .338 Lapua Magnum (8.6×70mm) cartridge, which remains supersonic up to a range of 1200–1500 m depending on the exact ammunition type and environmental conditions.

The PGM 338 is intended to fulfill a long-range anti-personnel role, and fills the capability void between the lighter 7.62×51mm NATO (.308) anti-personnel sniper rifles, which do not have the sufficient maximum effective range to be effectively used at ultra long ranges, and the larger .50 BMG (12.7×99mm) anti-materiel rifles, which lack the portability of lighter systems. The PGM 338 was designed by Chris L. Movigliatti (when he worked for PGM Précision) of the Swiss AMSD company and is produced by PGM Précision of France. The rifle is distributed directly through PGM in France, Drake Associates, Inc. of the United States and Liemke Defence in Germany and other European countries.

The PGM 338 main commercial competitors/equivalents on the high-end factory sniper rifle market are the Accuracy International Arctic Warfare and Sako TRG product lines. All these rifles are comparable performance-wise.

== Design details ==
Like its larger brother - the PGM Hécate II (chambered in .50 BMG), the PGM 338 is structured around a central rigid metal girder chassis, giving it a skeletal "barebones" appearance to minimize weight and simplify maintenance.

The receiver is made from a high quality 7075 aircraft-grade aluminum alloy, while the steel bolt has three lugs that lock into a barrel extension. It also has overpressure vent holes allowing high-pressure gases a channel of escape in the rare event of a cartridge case head failure. The barrel was designed by the German firm Lothar Walther and is cold hammer forged. The match grade fluted barrel is mounted fully floated and sports an integrated muzzle brake with a 50% recoil reduction effectiveness. The barrel features a non-conventional 305 mm (1:12 in) right-hand twist rate optimized for firing 16.2 gram (250 grain) .338-calibre very-low-drag bullets (VLD). Longer, heavier VLD bullets, like the Sierra HPBT MatchKing 19.44 gram (300 grain) projectile require a 254 mm (1:10 in) rifling twist rate.

The furniture (pistol grip and forearm) is made from a polymer material and is mounted to the frame. The buttstock is made from metal and has an adjustable shoulder pad for comfortable aiming and minimizing the effects of recoil on the operator. It is also adjustable for the length of pull and height, and can be folded to the left side of the receiver to reduce the overall dimensions of the rifle and make it more portable. An adjustable rear folding ground spike under the stock helps to keep the rifle in a stable position for extended periods of time and is most effective when coupled with the folding bipod support under the rifle barrel. A pistol grip is used for comfortable wielding of the weapon, especially during prolonged periods of time during which the operator must be immediately ready to open fire.

The rifle has a fully adjustable two-stage trigger featuring an adjustable trigger pull weight of 10 N (2.2 lb_{f}) to 16 N (3.6 lb_{f}) that can be adjusted by an armourer and a fast lock time.

The PGM 338 is fitted with a Picatinny rail so that it may be equipped with a wide range of commercial and NATO-standard optical sights, lights, night vision equipment and other tactical accessories. It also has an optional set of emergency iron sights to be used in case of the failure of the primary sight.

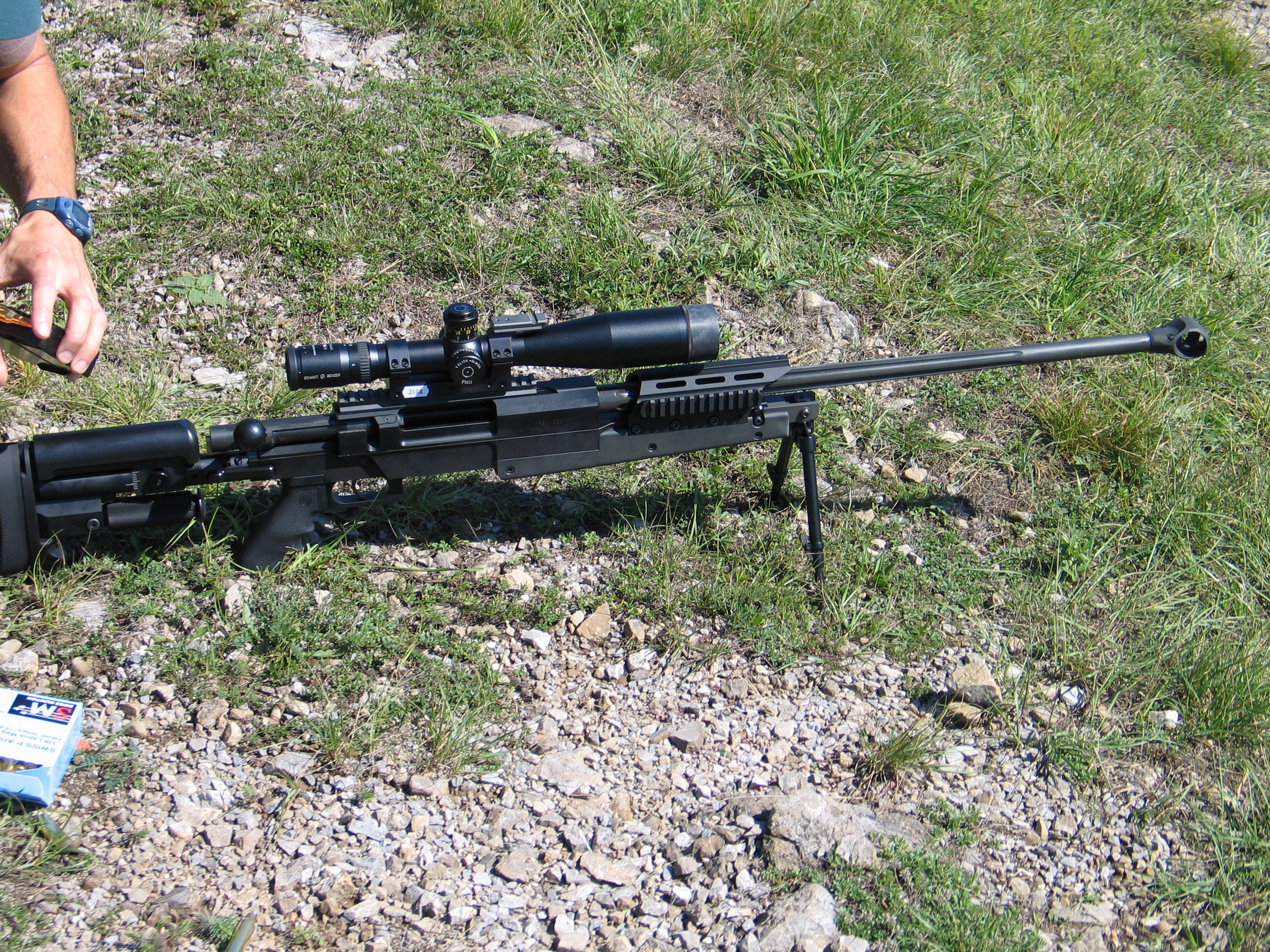
PGM 338 rifle.

Normally muzzle brakes are fitted to reduce recoil, jump and flash. The PGM factory muzzle brakes are however detachable if a user does not wish to use it. In order to preserve an optimal shooting comfort, the factory advises to avoid firing without the muzzle brake or silencer attached.

The PGM 338 is primarily intended for anti-personnel sniper work at distances between 500 and 1400 m, and can consistently achieve an accuracy of about 0.5 MOA with match-grade ammunition when employed by a qualified marksman. At distances below 500 m, the .338 Lapua Magnum would be too powerful for anti-personnel use and cause overpenetration in most circumstances, unless deep material penetration is required. At distances beyond 1200 m, the standard .338 Lapua Magnum bullets enter the transonic velocity region, thus significantly degrading its accuracy, but remaining somewhat reliable up to 1500 m.

The rifle is most often used with a 10-round box magazine, although larger capacity magazines are also available.

Factory accessories are: PGM sound-suppressor, ergonomic wooden grip, kit consisting of a long Picatinny rail and side Picatinny rails, PGM telescopic sight mounts, PGM back-up iron sights, transport case with formed foam and a carrying sling.

== Users ==
- Armenia: Used by Army Special Forces
- Chile: Chilean Army with BOE
- Israel: Israel Special Forces
- Kenya: Used by the 40th Ranger Regiment.
- Poland: GROM.
- Singapore: Singapore Armed Forces Commando Formation.
- Slovenia: Slovenian Armed Forces.

== See also ==
- PGM Ultima Ratio
- PGM Hécate II
- Brügger & Thomet APR a Swiss sniper rifle that was developed based on the PGM sniper rifles.
