= List of equipment of the Republic of Singapore Navy =

This is a list of equipment of the Republic of Singapore Navy, the naval service branch of the Singapore Armed Forces (SAF). It is subdivided into vessels, aircraft, and weapons.

== Aircraft ==
Aircraft	Image	Type	Variants	Origin	Quantity	Notes
Unmanned aerial vehicles (UAV)
Boeing-Insitu Scaneagle		Unmanned aerial vehicle		United States	Unknown	

== Weapons ==
=== Ship/submarine missiles ===
Model	Image	Type	Variants	Origin	Quantity	Notes
Surface-to-air missile (SAM)
Aster		Vertically-launched surface-to-air missile	Aster-15 Aster-30	France/ Italy	Unknown	
MICA		Vertically-launched surface-to-air missile	VL MICA-M IR	France	Unknown	
Mistral	Simbad missile	Manportable surface-to-air missile	SIMBAD-RC	France	Unknown	
Barak 1		Surface-to-air missile		Israel	Unknown	
Anti-ship missile (AShM)
Harpoon		Anti-ship missile		United States	Unknown	Capable of being launched from submarines
Blue Spear SSM		Anti-ship missile		Israel/ Singapore	Unknown	Developed as a joint venture between IAI and ST Aerospace
Torpedoes
A244-S		Torpedo	Mod.1 Mod.3	Italy	Unknown Unknown	
Black Shark		Torpedo	NSP BSA	Italy	Unknown Unknown	
TP617	Displayed at Navy at Vivo, Singapore	Torpedo	Unknown Unknown	Sweden	Unknown Unknown	Export variant of Torped 613

== See also ==
- List of equipment of the Singapore Army
- List of equipment of the Republic of Singapore Air Force
