= Tapering (firearms) =

Firearm components that narrow down

In firearms, tapering refers to components that narrow down like a cone does, hence the name taper.

== Barrels ==
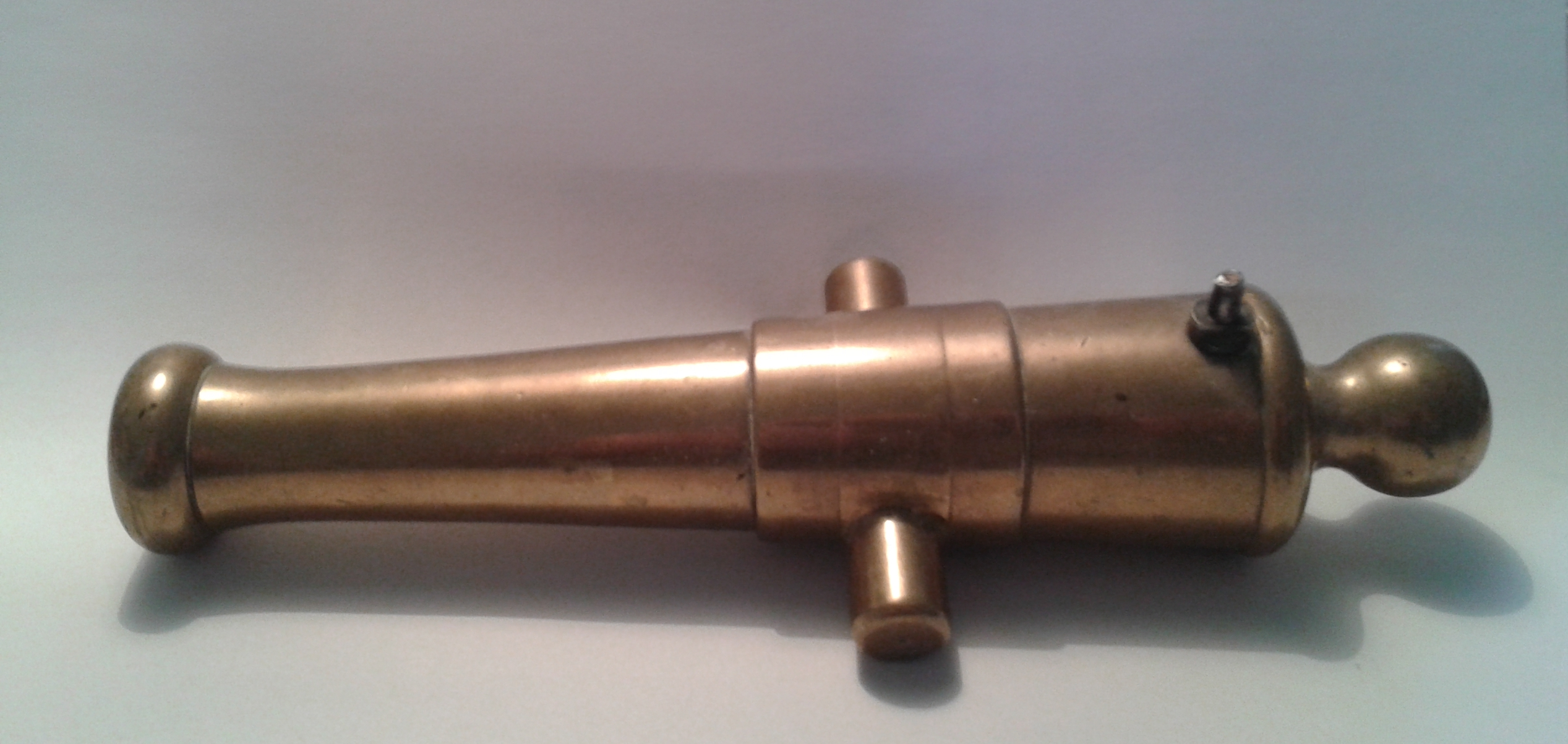
Tapered barrel of a cannon.

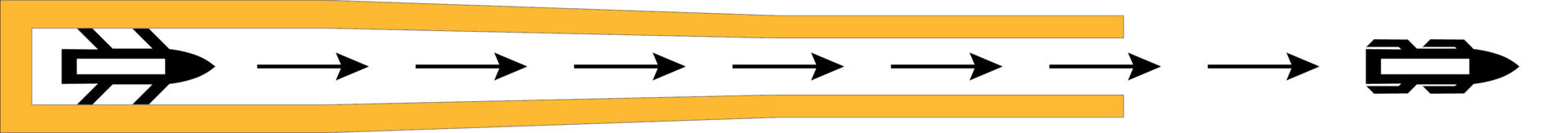
Tapered bore.

In barrels, this centralises mass to the operator, not only to reduce perceived weight due to center of mass, but also to improve accuracy/acquisition and stabilise the balance handling of the weapon. In addition, a tapered barrel means that chamber pressures are higher, leading to increased round velocity.

== Cartridges ==
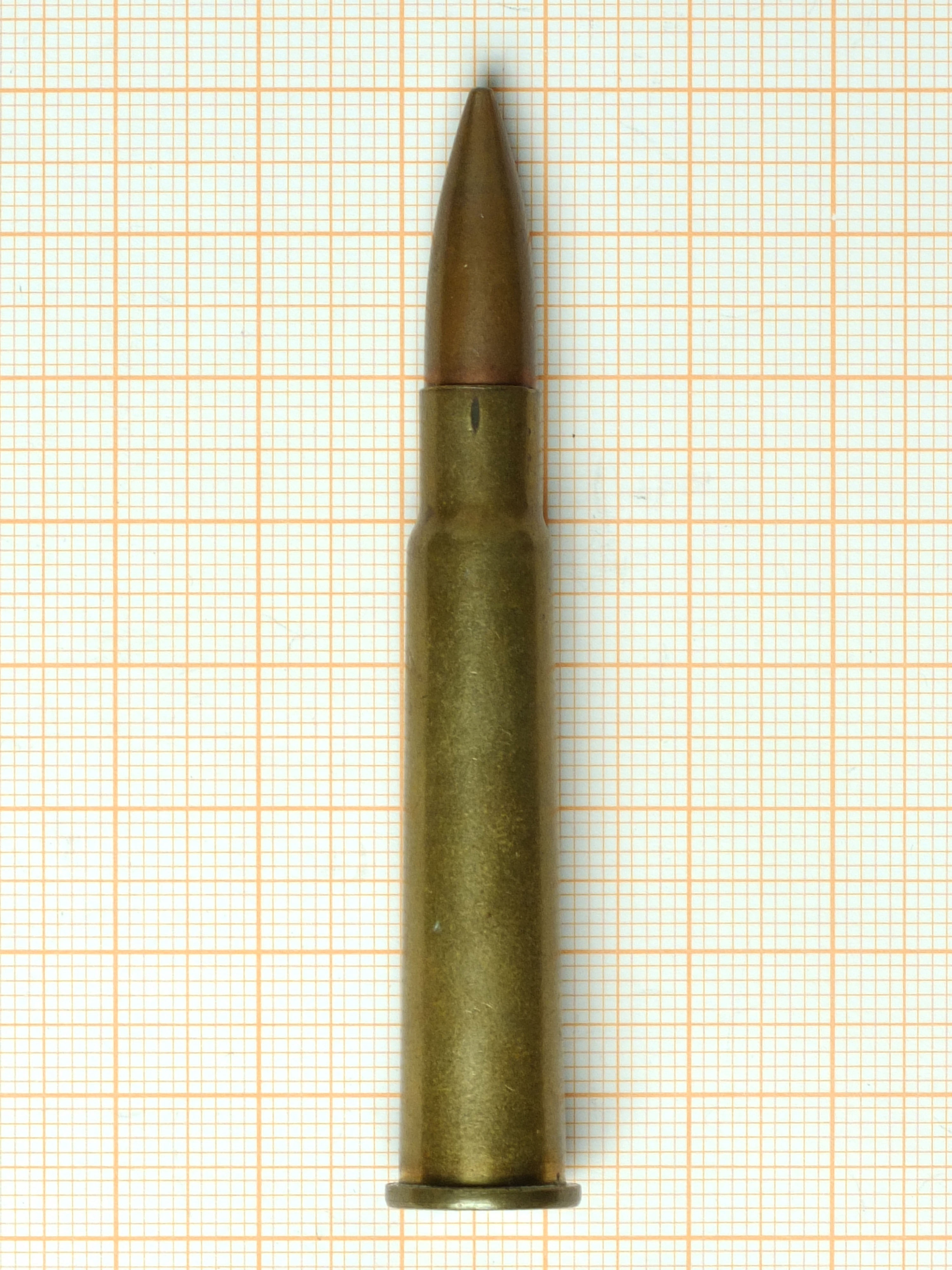
Tapered rifle cartridge.

In cartridges, this usually helps in chambering/unloading the weapon. This differs from shouldering/bottlenecking, which only refers to the case head of the cartridge that holds the projectile, whereas tapering usually refers to the angled sides of the cartridge.

== See also ==
- Squeeze bore
- Built-up gun
- Fluting (firearms)
