= Brügger & Thomet APR =

APR
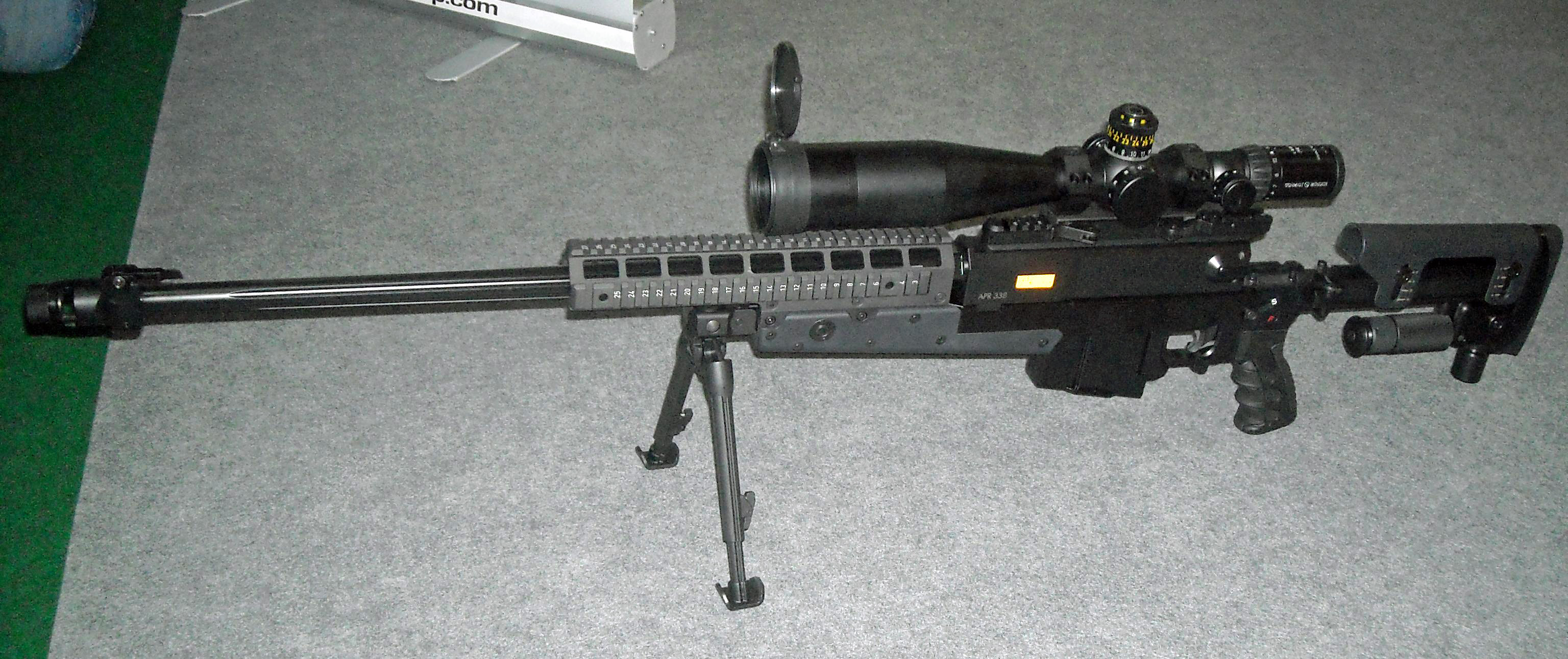
- APR338
- Type: Sniper rifle
- Place of origin: Switzerland

Service history
- Used by: See Users

Production history
- Designer: Brügger & Thomet
- Designed: APR308: 2003; APR338: 2007
- Manufacturer: Brügger & Thomet
- Produced: APR308: 2005–present APR338: 2008–present
- Variants: APR308P, APR308S, APR338

Specifications
- Mass: APR308: 7.01 kg (15.45 lb); APR308P: 6.8 kg (15 lb); APR308S, APR338: 8.2 kg (18 lb)
- Length: APR308: 1,139 mm (44.8 in) stock extended / 906 mm (35.7 in); APR308P: 1,028 mm (40.5 in) stock extended / 795 mm (31.3 in) stock folded APR308S: 1,211 mm (47.7 in) stock extended / 978 mm (38.5 in) stock folded APR338: 1,236 mm (48.7 in) stock extended / 1,002 mm (39.4 in) stock folded
- Barrel length: APR308: 610 mm (24.0 in); APR308P: 500 mm (19.7 in); APR308S: 400 mm (15.7 in); APR338: 690 mm (27.2 in)
- Width: APR308, APR308P, APR308S: 50 mm (2.0 in) stock extended / 86 mm (3.4 in) stock folded APR338: 50 mm (2.0 in) stock extended / 90 mm (3.5 in) stock folded
- Cartridge: APR308, APR308P, APR308S: 7.62×51mm NATO/.308 Winchester; APR338: .338 Lapua Magnum
- Action: Bolt-action, manually operated
- Effective firing range: APR308: 1,000 m (1,094 yd); APR308P: 600 m (656 yd); APR308S: 150 m (164 yd); APR338: 1,300^{+} m (1,422^{+} yd)
- Feed system: 10-round detachable box magazine
- Sights: Emergency flip-up iron sights, day or night optics

The APR (Advanced Precision Rifle) is a bolt-action sniper rifle designed by the Thun-based Brügger & Thomet in 2003 as an evolution of the French PGM Précision.

== History ==
In 2003, B&T who was then a long-time supplier of PGM rifles, competed in a tender to sell the French-made but Swiss modified rifle to the Singapore Army, which at the time was planning to acquire a new 7.62×51mm NATO precision rifle. After some confusing communication with PGM Précision over who had the rights to sell the PGM 7.62mm sniper rifle to the Singaporean Army, Brügger & Thomet decided in 2003 to improve the PGM rifle and produce the new design at their own manufacturing facility in Switzerland. The Brügger & Thomet APR308 sniper rifle was first presented to the public at the 2005 Milipol exhibition and since then has been adopted as a standard sniper rifle by the Singapore Army.

The APR's main commercial competitors/equivalents on the high-end factory sniper rifle market are beside the PGM Précision product line, the Accuracy International Arctic Warfare and Sako TRG product lines. All these rifles are comparable performance-wise.

== Design details ==
=== Features ===
The APR system is a purpose-designed modular sniper rifle system, rather than an accurized version of an existing, general-purpose rifle. According to the manufacturer, although being a precision-instrument, the APR system will resist harsh military use and remain functional in typical operational environments.

The APR uses a metal lower receiver that functions as a main frame or chassis to which all other rifle components are assembled or attached. The manual ambidextrous safety is integrated into the lower receiver. This chassis houses the upper receiver which consists of a bolt group and barrel, as well as the fire control group, folding butt stock and other furniture. The contact surface between the upper and lower receiver functions as an unconventional bedding surface.

The upper receiver consists of a housing, in which a locking ring is permanently fixed, and a Picatinny rail as an interface to the rifle scope. Integrated in this scope mount rail is the rear part of the emergency iron sight, designed as a factory zeroed flip-up sight. Into the locking ring, the bolt locks by rotation; thus, the receiver with locking ring, bolt and barrel form the breech of the rifle. The APR rifle has a traditional manually operated rotary bolt with three radial locking lugs at the front. The bolt requires only a 60° bolt rotation.

The trigger group, manual safety and pistol grip consist of one detachable module attached under the receiver. This group consists of a fully adjustable two-stage trigger featuring an adjustable trigger pull weight of 1.5 to 2.5 kg (3.3 to 5.5 lb) and a trigger path that can be externally adjusted without disassembly of the unit. An ambidextrous manual safety is located above the pistol grip. The APR308 has a side-folding stock which is attached to the lower receiver with a rugged steel hinge. It offers an adjustable butt plate and length of pull spacer system. The cheek-rest is also fully adjustable, which is an uncommon feature, as most folding stocks do not allow for customization. An additional folding height-adjustable monopod is attached to the rear of the buttstock and allows the shooter to rest the rifle during extended periods of observation.

The weapon's stock is made of a polymer material and is attached to the lower receiver. It has provisions for mounting a folding height-adjustable bipod. The APR feed system consists of a detachable 10-round stainless steel box magazine. When the magazine is empty, it stops the forward motion of the bolt. The magazine feeds through the lower receiver into the upper receiver and is held by a magazine catch, which is integrated into the trigger group.

=== Barrel ===
The free-floating forged fluted barrels have appropriate attachments for a factory-provided steel muzzle brake that carries the front part of the emergency sight, which therefore never has to be removed. The muzzle brake's effectiveness is rated at a recoil reduction of 40%. It also serves as a mounting point for a quick-detachable sound suppressor and includes a thread protector to protect the thread if no suppressor is attached. The APR308's barrel accuracy life is estimated at 7,000 rounds.

At its chamber end, the barrel becomes screwed into the receiver and presses into the upper receiver's locking ring. For the .308 Winchester chambering, the 280 mm (1:11 in) right-hand rifling twist rate with four grooves was selected over the 305 mm (1:12 in) twist traditionally used with .308 Winchester ammunition, as a compromise when switching between supersonic and subsonic cartridges and facilitating the use of 7.62mm projectiles up to 19.96 g (200 gr).

=== Sights ===
Every APR rifle is equipped with a MIL-STD-1913 rail on top of the upper receiver for mounting components to accommodate different types of optical or electro-optical sights, with the option to mount three extra rails on the stock for attaching tactical accessories. The rifle can be equipped with an optional folding front sight and an aperture-type rear sight. Iron sights cannot be mounted on integrally silenced APR models. Brügger & Thomet offers a proprietary TRS (Tactical Rifle Scope) telescopic sight for the APR. The TRS is a Schmidt & Bender PMII 3-12×50 LP scope with a proprietary stadiametric rangefinding reticle layout made exclusively for Brügger & Thomet. The TRS scope is meant to be mounted with a Brügger & Thomet mounting set consisting of two scope rings, where the front ring provides an adaptor for Simrad KN night sights. Those rings are attached to a Picatinny interface on the rifle's upper receiver. The scope and mount are clamped on the rifle's Picatinny rail by the tension of two levers, allowing the operator to quickly remove the scope in case of failure or while cleaning or during transit. Detaching and attaching the scope repeatedly will not affect the zero. APR rifles can be equipped with an anti-mirage band to suppress mirage caused by air heated by a warm barrel during extended training sessions.

=== Ammunition ===
The APR308 is chambered to fire the .308 Winchester cartridge as well as its military equivalent— 7.62×51mm NATO (which has slightly different chamber specifications and a lower maximum chamber pressure compared to the .308 Winchester). The APR308 system is designed to handle cartridges up to 71.3 mm (2.81 in) in overall length.

With recommended ammunition the APR308's accuracy should be ≤ 1 MOA at any practical range. Brügger & Thomet specifies the rifle provides a ≥ R_{99} (99% or better) first hit probability against a head-sized target at 400 m and torso-sized target at 800 m. The specified maximum effective range with appropriate ammunition (RUAG Swiss P 10.87 g (168 gr) recommended for mid-range applications up to 600 m, Norma Diamond Line 12.31 g (190 gr)—recommended for long range applications up to 1,000 m), Lapua D46 12 g (185 gr) (suitable for military applications) is 1,000 meters.

=== Accessories ===
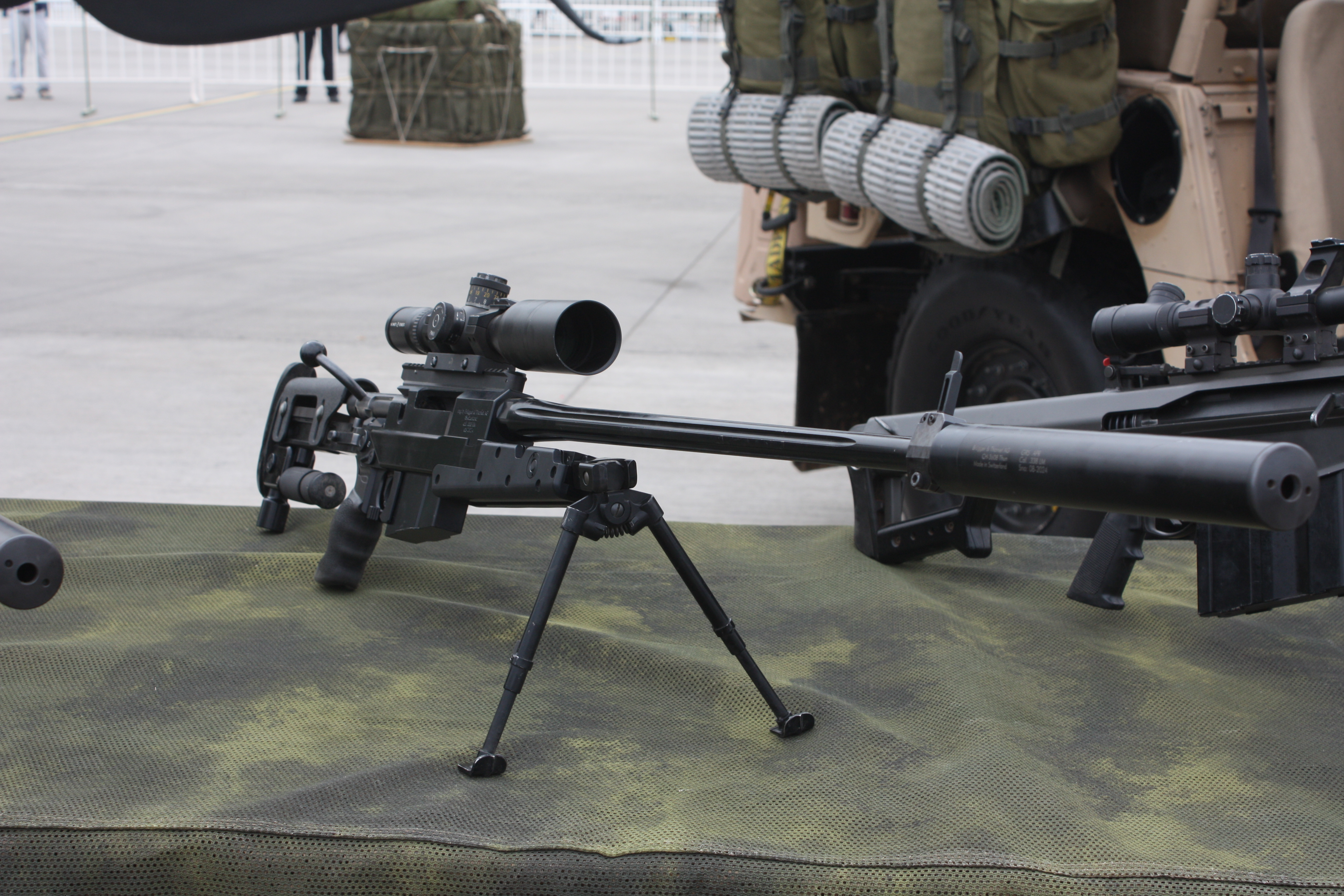
APR338 suppressed in Fidae 2016

As a manufacturer of firearm sound suppressors, Brügger & Thomet also offers quick-detachable suppressors for the APR series. The APR308 GRS suppressor reduces the acoustical report of the weapon by 36 dB(A) and also reduces the optical muzzle signature.

Other accessories supplied with the rifle include a lightweight soft case for transporting the APR, a triple rail interface which fits to the weapon's chassis without any modification and provides three additional Picatinny rails that can be used to mount night vision equipment other than Simrad, laser aiming/designation devices or illumination tools.

== Variants ==
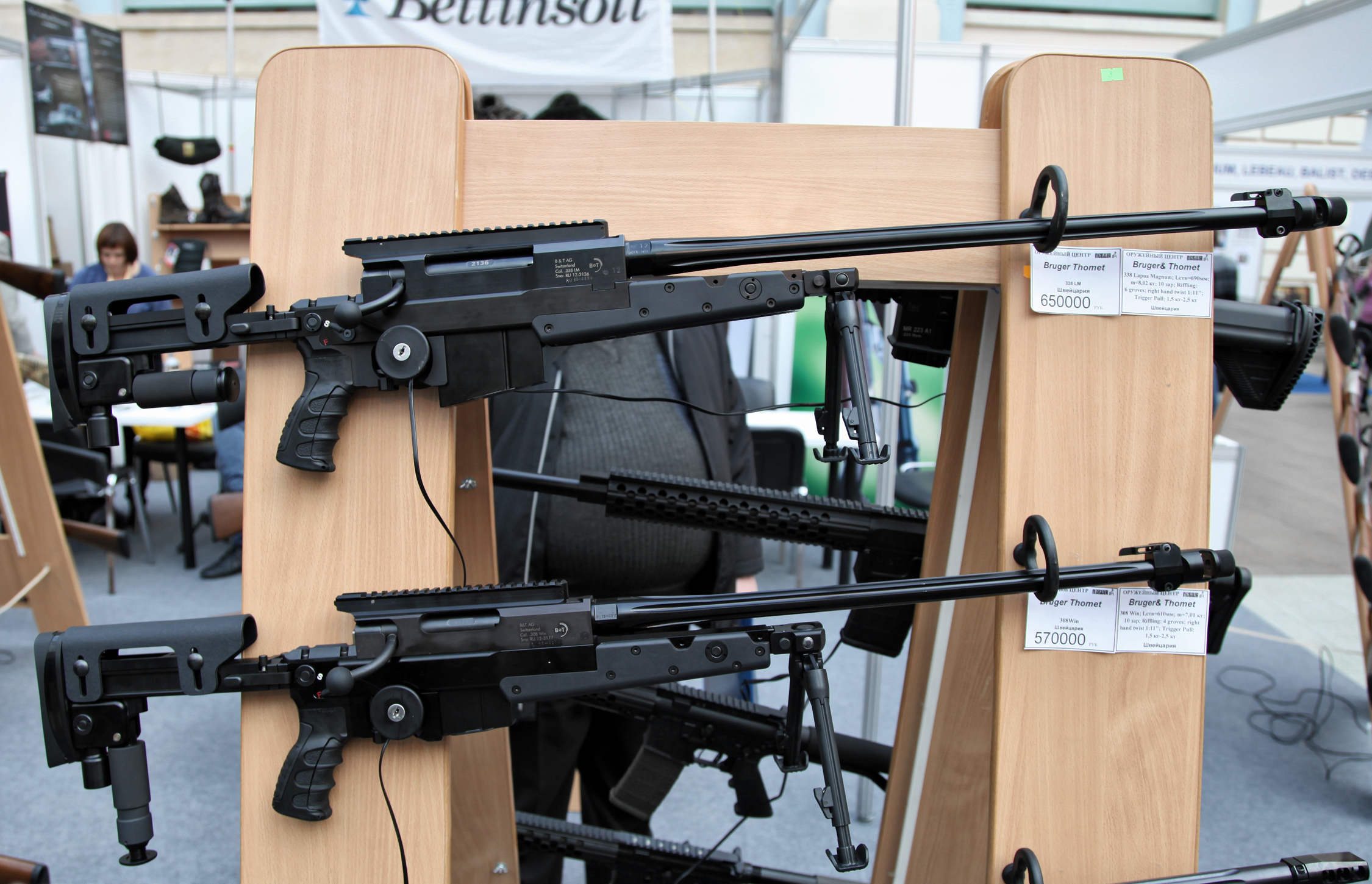
Brügger & Thomet APR: Top chambered in .338 Lapua Magnum and bottom chambered in .308 Winchester

The APR308 is available in several specialized variants. The APR308P was designed for tactical police applications and has a shorter, 500 mm (19.7 in) barrel with a different muzzle device. The rifle is to be used exclusively with optical sights, as the iron sights were removed. The rifle also lacks a drop safety, present in the standard, military version and because of the reduced barrel the effective range has dropped to 600 m.

A sound-suppressed version of the APR308 is the APR308S with a 400 mm (15.7 in) barrel and integral sound suppressor. This model too is not fitted with back-up iron sights or a drop safety device and can only be used with subsonic ammunition (200–240 gr projectiles).

The APR308 rifle was also used to develop a larger variant intended for use at extended ranges. The APR338 chambered for the .338 Lapua Magnum round was first introduced at the 2007 Milipol exhibition in Paris and became available in 2008. The APR338 system is designed to handle cartridges up to 94 mm (3.70 in) overall length.

The APR338 is intended as a military long range anti-personnel rifle. Brügger & Thomet specifies the rifle provides a 99% or higher first hit probability against a head-sized target up to 600 m or a torso-sized target at 1,300 m with appropriate ammunition (Lapua Scenar 250 grain recommended). The rifle's barrel has an unconventional 279 mm (1:11 in) right-hand twist rate, optimized for firing .338-calibre very-low-drag bullets up to 16.85 g (260 gr). Longer, heavier very-low-drag bullets like the Sierra HPBT MatchKing .338-calibre 19.44 g (300 gr) can be used, but require a 254 mm (1:10 in) twist rate to stabilize them under high air density conditions as found on arctic coasts. The APR338 barrel accuracy life is estimated at 2,500 rounds. The rifle can be employed with an APR338 GRS suppressor, which reduces the acoustical signature by up to 25 dB(A).

== Users ==
- Georgia: Used by law enforcement and counter terrorism units.
- India: Used by law enforcement and counter terrorism units of Mizoram state.
- Luxembourg: Used by Unité Spéciale de la Police of the Grand Ducal Police (APR308P).
- Portugal: Used by Special Operations Intervention Group of the National Republican Guard
- Romania: Used by Romanian intelligence service forces (APR308)
- Singapore: Used by the Singaporean Army (APR308)
- Ukraine: Made under license by Tactical Systems as the TS.M.308/338 and used by law enforcement forces under Ministry of Internal Affairs. In March 2022, the Rapid Operational Response Unit acquired the TS.M.308.
- Vietnam: Used by Mobile Police Command (CSCĐ) teams (APR308)
