= ST Aerospace Skyblade =

Type of aircraft

The Skyblade is a man-portable mini-UAV developed by ST Aerospace, designed to be used by two operators for short-range battlefield or tactical reconnaissance and artillery spotting.

== Models ==
- Skyblade I: Prototype version. Jointly developed with local research house (DSO National Laboratories)
- Skyblade II: Advance Production exploration, gasoline engine. Completely in-house developed. Didn't make it to full production.
- Skyblade III: Production version, all electric systems. Jointly developed with local research house (DSO National Laboratories)

The Skyblade III is designed for rapid 2-man deployment to support military and civilian applications. Developed for fully autonomous flight operations, it delivers quick and accurate intelligence in real-time to tactical commanders in the field.

- Skyblade IV: New tactical UAV

The SkyBlade IV is a completely new close-range tactical UAV unveiled in Asian Aerospace 2006, with a takeoff weight of 50 kilograms (110 pounds), including a 12 kilograms (26 pounds) payload, a torpedo-like fuselage, a straight high-mounted wing with upturned wingtips, cruciform tailfins and a pusher prop driven by a piston engine with an endurance of up to 12 hours. The UAV carries an EO-IR sensor system with STA working on a miniaturized SAR. The vehicle is catapult launched and is recovered via parachutes or catch nets. Skyblade IV can perform a variety of operational missions such as surveillance, reconnaissance, fire support and battle damage assessment.

== Military use in Singapore ==
Since 2010, six army units of the Singapore Armed Forces are equipped with the Skyblade III variant for scout and field intelligence gathering. The units are: the 40th Battalion of the Singapore Armoured Regiment (40 SAR), 41 SAR, 2 Singapore Infantry Regiment (2 SIR), 3 SIR, 3rd Singapore Infantry Brigade (3 SIB), and the 4th Singapore Armoured Brigade (4 SAB).

== Specifications ==
Skyblade II prototype

- Length: 1.2 m (3.9 ft)
- Wing span: 1.8 m (5.9 ft)
- Operating altitude: 458 m (1,503 ft)
- Endurance (minimum) (depending on internal combustion or electric version): 1-2 hrs
- Stall speed: 18 kn (33 km/h)
- Maximum speed: 70 kn (130 km/h)
- Operating wind conditions: 20 kn (37 km/h)
- Head wind during take-off and landing: 15 kn (28 km/h)
- Cross wind during take-off and landing: 10 kn (19 km/h)
- Range: up to 8 km line-of-sight

Skyblade III specifications

- Length: 1.4 m
- Wing Span: 2.6 m
- Maximum Take Off Weight: 5.0 kg
- Endurance: >60 mins
- Operating Altitude: 300–1,500 ft (91–457 m)
- Maximum Speed: 35 kts
- Range: 8 km
- Flight Operation: Fully autonomous from launch to mission execution to recovery

Skyblade IV specifications

- Length: 2.4 m
- Wing Span: 3.7 m
- Maximum Take Off Weight: 70 kg
- Maximum Payload Weight: 12 kg
- Endurance: 6 – 12 hrs
- Maximum Altitude: 15,000 ft [4,600 m]
- Operating Speed: 50 -80 kts
- Range: 100 km
- Launch: Catapult
- Recovery: Parachute
- Flight Operation: Fully autonomous
