= PGM Précision =

French weapons company

- Company type: Private
- Industry: Firearms
- Founded: 1991; 35 years ago
- Founders: Gilles Payen, Alain Gonnet, François Morier
- Headquarters: Poisy, Haute-Savoie, Auvergne-Rhône-Alpes, France
- Products: Sniper rifles Ammunitions; Accessories
- Website: www.pgmprecision.com

PGM Précision (styled as PGM PRECISION) is a French firearms manufacturer for high-precision rifles. The company has fewer than 10 employees. It generated revenue of approximately €1.5 million in 2015. The company subcontracts its manufacturing to Teissier Group.

The company's product is used by the Latvian National Armed Forces.

== Products ==
- PGM Hécate II (12.7×99mm NATO / .50 BMG), .416 Barrett/10.6×83mm
- PGM 338 (.338 Lapua Magnum / 8.6×70mm)
- PGM Ultima Ratio (7.62×51mm NATO as main military chambering)
  .300 Savage, 7mm-08 Remington, .260 Remington, 6.5×47mm Lapua and 6mm Norma BR on special request.
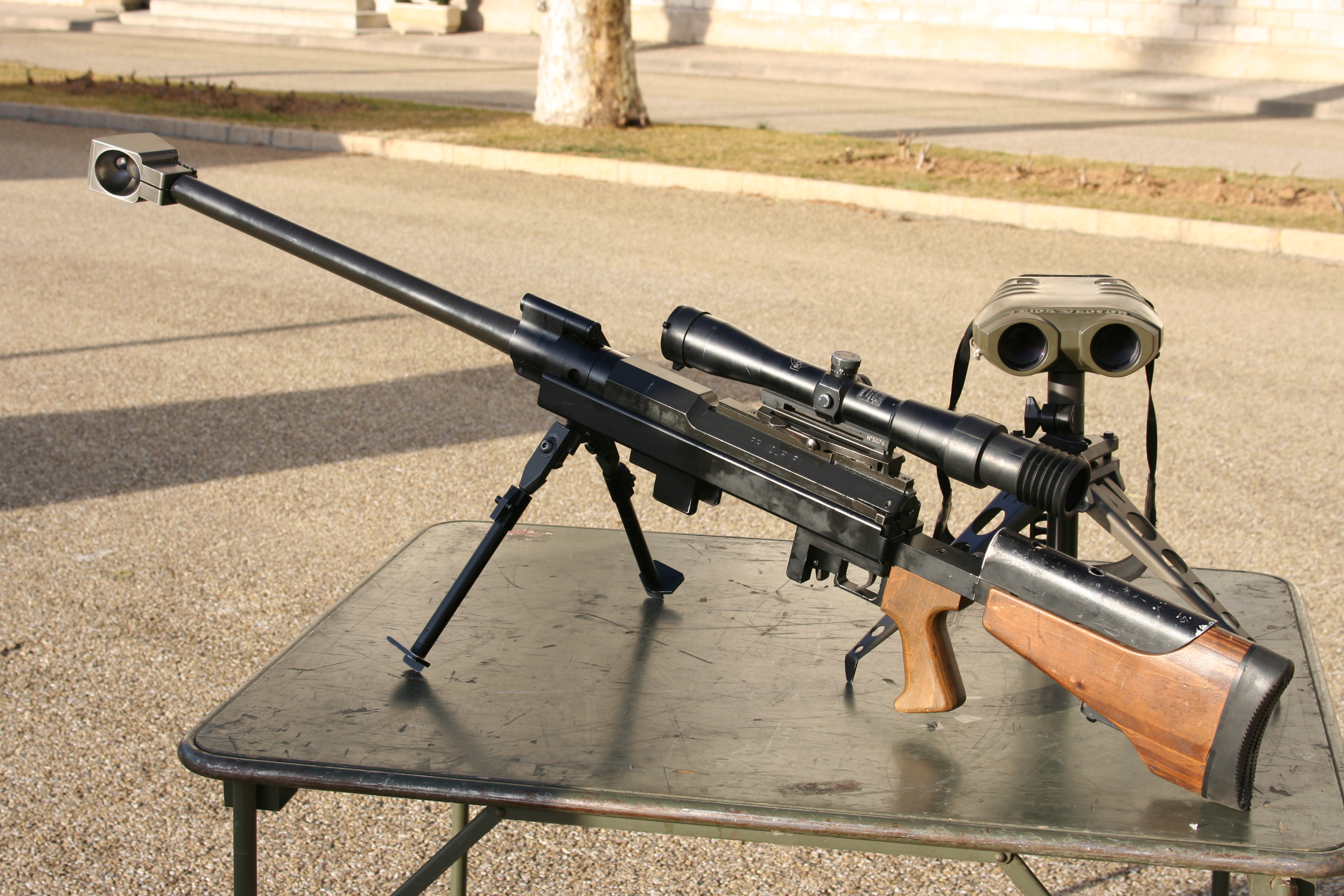
A PGM Hécate II.

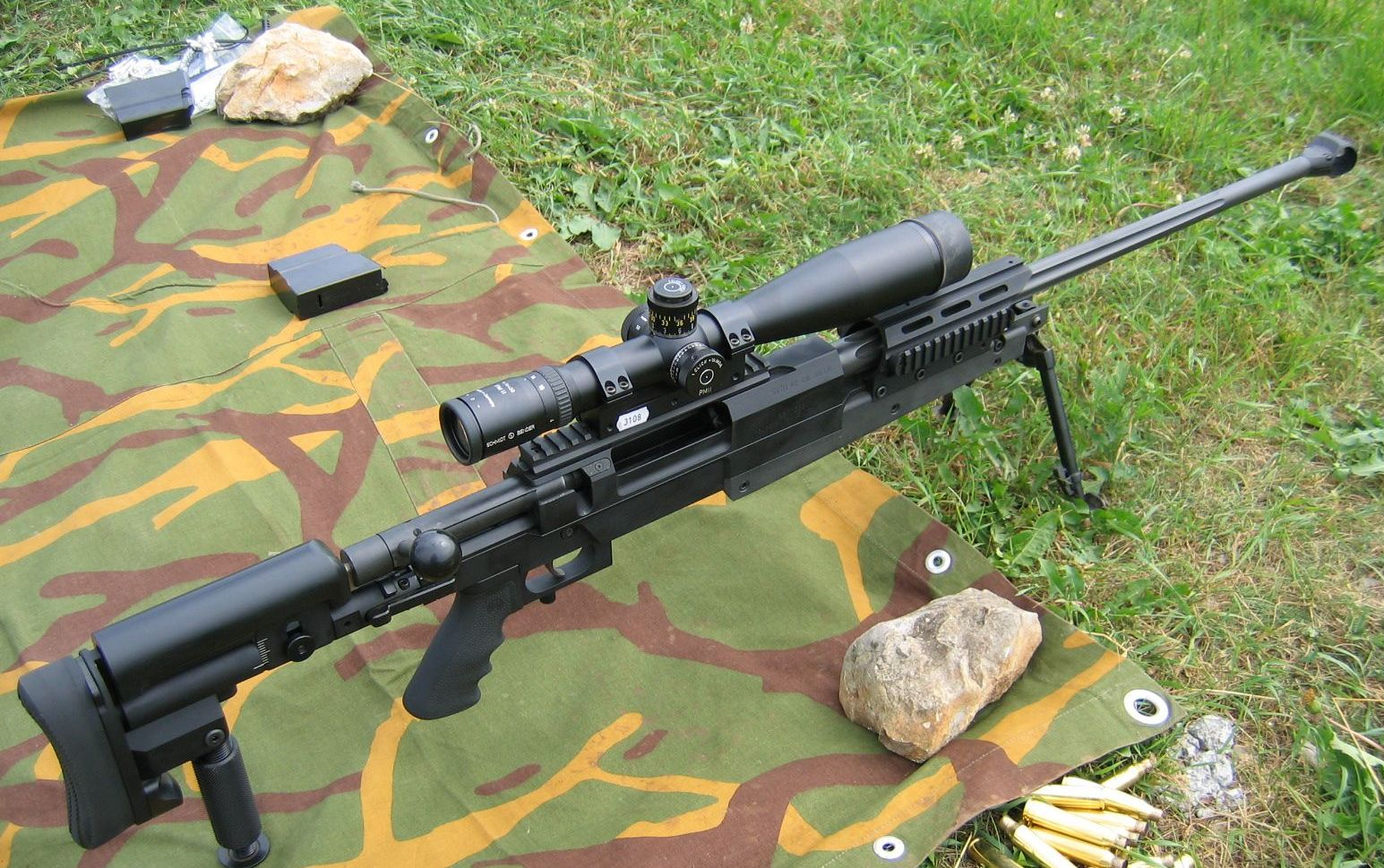
Mini-Hécate, chambered in .338 Lapua Magnum.
