= Length of pull =

Firearm measurement

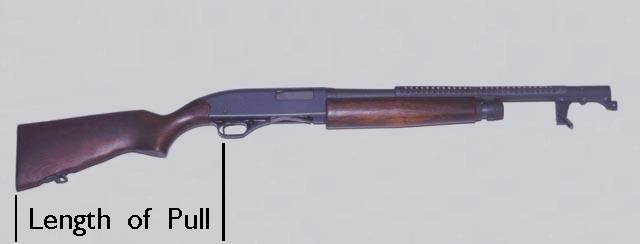
Pictorial definition of distance

Length of pull (sometimes abbreviated as LOP) is the distance from the trigger to the part of a rifle or shotgun which fits against the shoulder of the shooter. Length of pull is an important ergonomic factor for ease of use; and optimum length of pull may vary with the size of the shooter, the thickness of chest clothing and body armor being worn, and whether the shooter is firing from a standing, sitting, or prone position.

== Variation ==
Many rifles and shotguns are manufactured with a standard length of pull assumed to fit most shooters. This is often approximately 13.5 in (34 cm) for rifles and about 0.8 in (2 cm) longer for shotguns. Shooters with short arms may find the buttstock dragging along the underside of their arm as they attempt to raise the firearm into firing position. Shooters with broad shoulders or a long neck may experience face injuries from collision with the telescopic sight or thumb of the trigger hand as the firearm recoils. Modern firearms may be equipped with a telescoping stock or removable spacers to adjust the length of pull. Gunsmiths may adjust the length of pull of custom-built firearms or older firearms by cutting off a portion of the buttstock or adding a recoil pad to the buttstock. Some sources suggest a shooter's optimum length of pull will allow the butt of the firearm to exactly reach the inside of the elbow when the hand of that arm grips the unloaded firearm with a finger on the trigger. Other sources suggest a more appropriate determination may be made using a non-firing "try-gun" resembling a firearm with an adjustable buttstock. When a properly adjusted try-gun is held in a firing position, the shooter's nose should be about two finger-widths behind the thumb of the trigger hand.

== See also ==
- Glossary of firearms terms
