= COMANF =

Brazilian Marine Corps special operations force

Marine Corps Special Operations Battalion
- Batalhão de Operações Especiais de Fuzileiros Navais
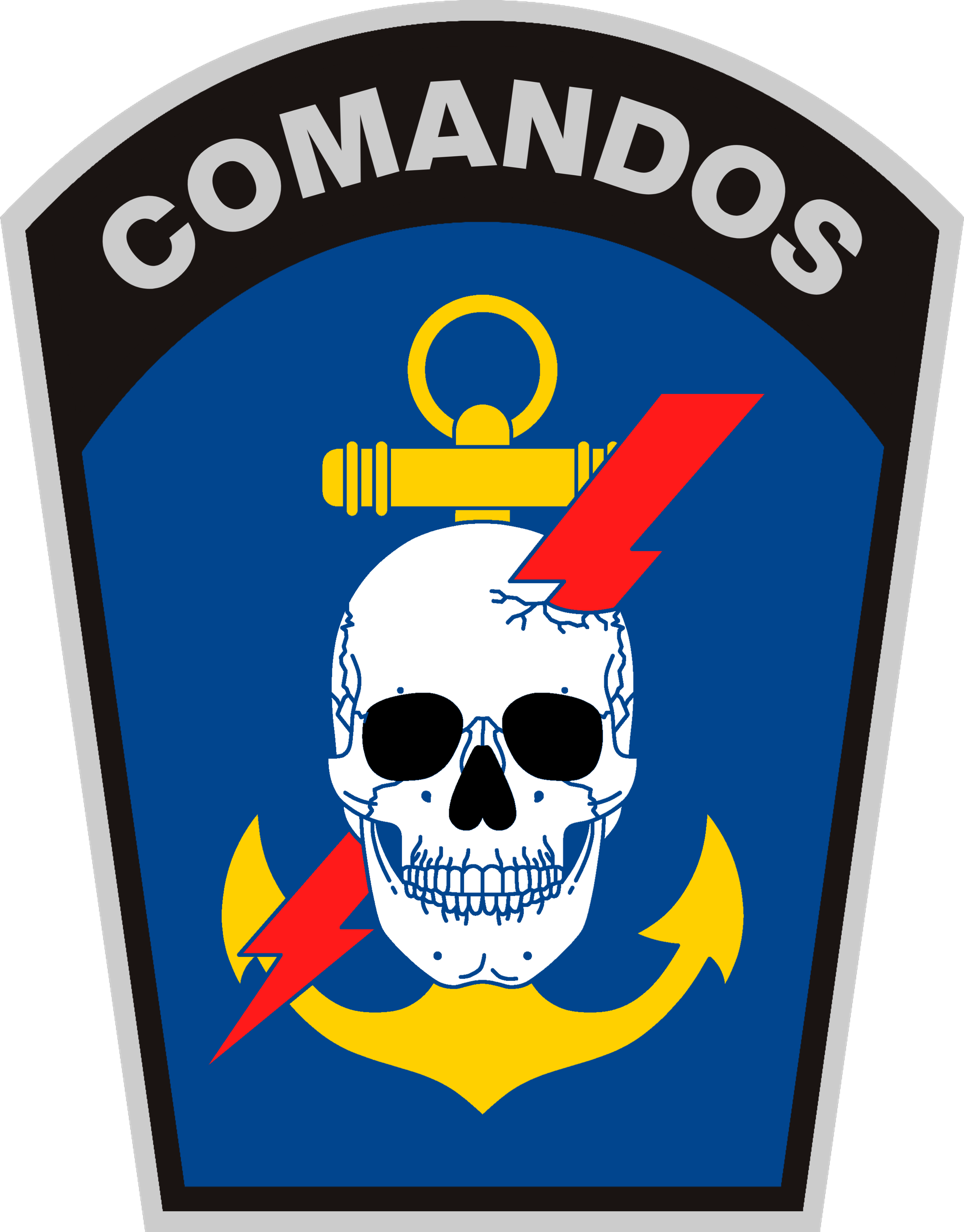
- Founded: 9 September 1971; 54 years ago
- Country: Brazil
- Allegiance: Brazilian Marine Corps
- Type: Special operations battalion
- Role: Direct action; Counter-terrorism; Special reconnaissance; Hostage rescue
- Part of: Brazilian Navy
- Nickname: COMANF
- Mottos: AUICA - Audazes, Unidos, Intrépidos, Comandos Anfíbios! Translation: Bold, United, Intrepid, Amphibious Commandos!
- Engagements: Araguaia guerilla; United Nations Angola Verification Mission III; United Nations Stabilisation Mission in Haiti; Security operations in Rio de Janeiro

The Marine Corps Special Operations Battalion, also known as Tonelero Battalion/Toneleros or Amphibious Commandos (COMANF), is a special operations battalion of the Brazilian Marine Corps. Its attributes include planning, conducting and executing special reconnaissance, direct action, counterterrorism and hostage rescue operations in support of Brazilian Marine Corps operations.

== History ==
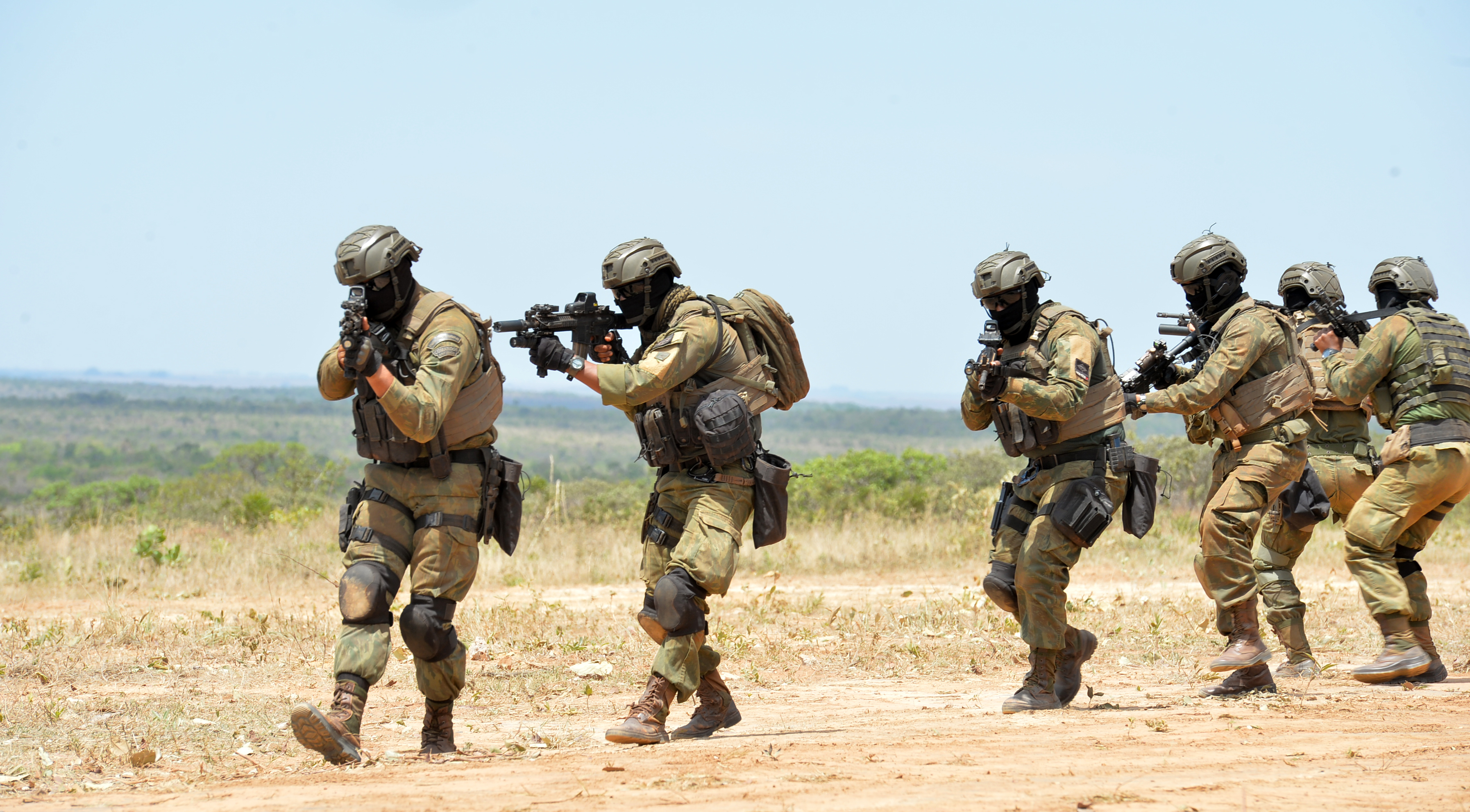
COMANFs train in the Cerrado during Operation Formosa 2016

The Tonelero Battalion (named after the Passage of the Tonelero) was created in the 9th of September 1971, due to the Marine Corps' interest in having a unit dedicated to anti-guerrilla warfare. At first, the battalion had a Command and Service Company and a Special Operations Company, which was structured similarly to one of the Marine Corps' infantry companies. In 1972, the first class of officers passed the battalion's selection, then called the "Counter-Guerrilla Course". Tonelero selection would then go through several changes throughout the years before being named "Special Course of Amphibious Commandos" (CEsComAnf) in 1998.

Despite initially being a reserve battalion for the Marine Corps, by 1996 COMANF had welcomed an Amphibious Recon Company and a Land Recon Company into its ranks, having become the Marine Corps' main unit for special operations and becoming directly subordinate to the Marine Corps Command.

== Structure ==
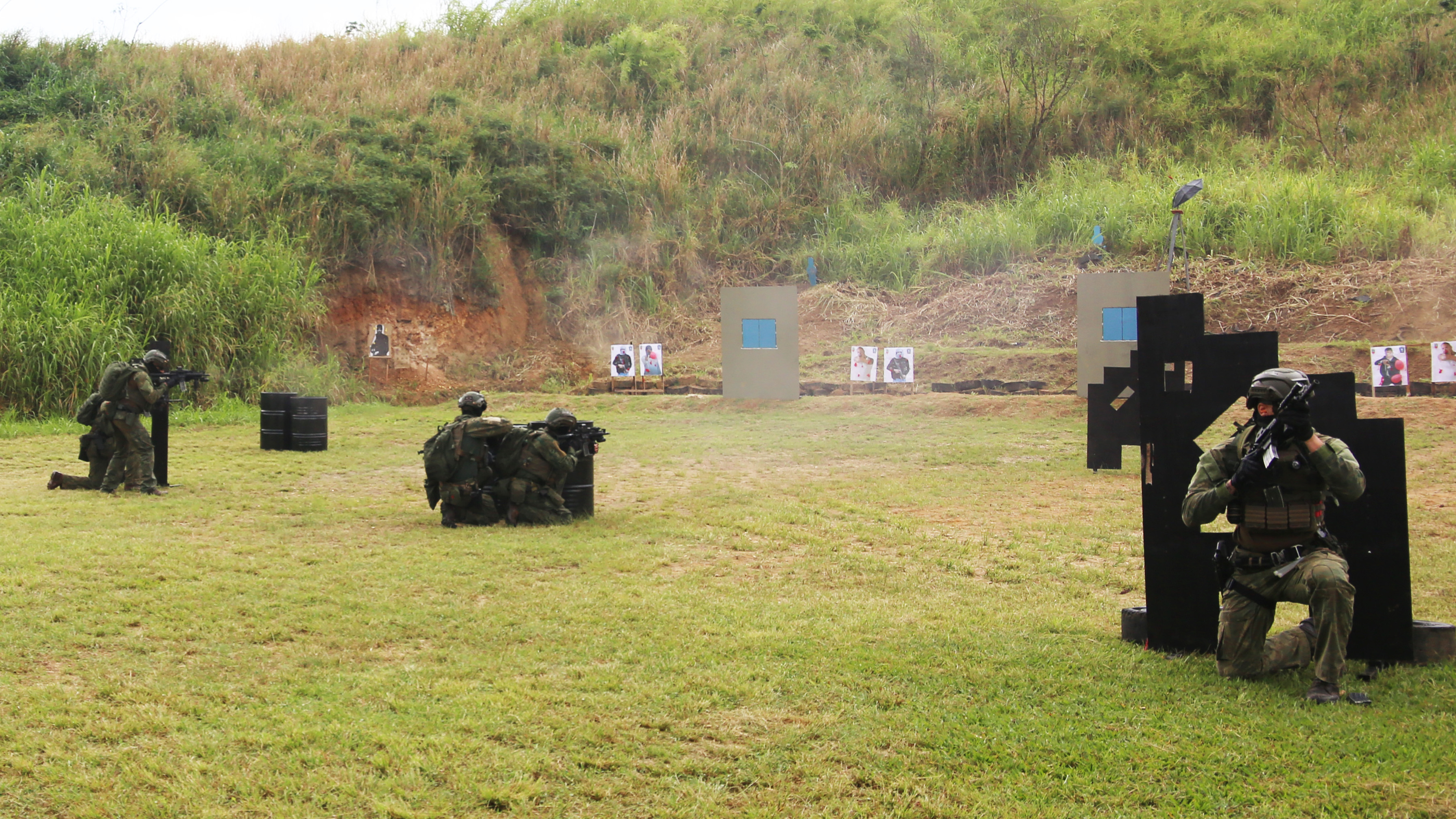
Marines in a 2022 training exercise

=== 1st Special Operations Company ===
Specialized Reconnaissance - RECON, pre-assault and post-assault reconnaissance actions are involved in support of landing forces, with highly qualified personnel as scuba divers or using the parachute as a means of infiltration with the mission of identifying and reporting enemy activities, conducting fires of support weapons, deploy sensors on the ground and guide operations with aircraft.

=== 2nd Special Operations Company ===
Commandos Action (Direct Actions), Commando actions aim to destroy or damage relevant objectives, retake facilities, capture or rescue personnel, obtain data, mislead and produce psychological effects.

=== 3rd Special Operations Company ===
Special Rescue and Recapture Group (GERR-OpEsp), the Special Rescue and Recapture Group (GERR), has the mission of rescuing military or civilian authorities kept in illegal confinement, counterterrorism, search and rescue of pilots slaughtered in combat and retake zones facilities of interest to the Navy and/or the Federal Government.

=== 4th Command and Service Company ===
Regarding the management of its material and human resources, the Battalion has a Command and Services Company and administrative autonomy through which it plans and executes the resources received from the Fleet Marine Force - FFE.

=== 5th Special Operations Support Company ===
Its task is to provide specialized combat service support, either on board, through the parachute folding and maintenance section, the diving support section and the vessel support section, or in the Marines Operative Grouping operations. The company organizes a Special Operations Support Detachment to work with the Marines Operative Grouping Combat Services Support Component, performing specialized support tasks, such as operating pneumatic landing craft, resupplying infiltrated special operations teams, or even carrying out the maintenance of specific material used in special operations, such as parachutes and diving equipment.

=== Special Operations Instruction Section ===
Train the human resources belonging to the Marine Corps Special Operations Battalion; Contribute to the development of the doctrine of Special Operations in the Marine Corps; and Conduct research and experimentation with new operational techniques and equipment peculiar to Special Operations.

== Symbols ==
=== Brevet ===
The identifying symbol of the Amphibious Commandos is their hostile-looking brevet with a skull pierced by lightning; meaning the enemy's death and the speed and violence in his actions, an anchor; meaning loyalty to the Brazilian Navy and the ability to perform aquatic operations, a pair of wings; meaning ability to operate by air, and a blue headstone; meaning darkness, a formidable environment for the activities of the Amphibious Commandos.

=== Black cap ===
Another identifying symbol of the Amphibious Commandos is the black cap that in the case of the Brazilian Marine Corps military personnel only the Amphibious Commandos use.

== See also ==
- GRUMEC - Combat Divers Group-ment
