= Fluting (firearms) =

Process in firearms manufacture

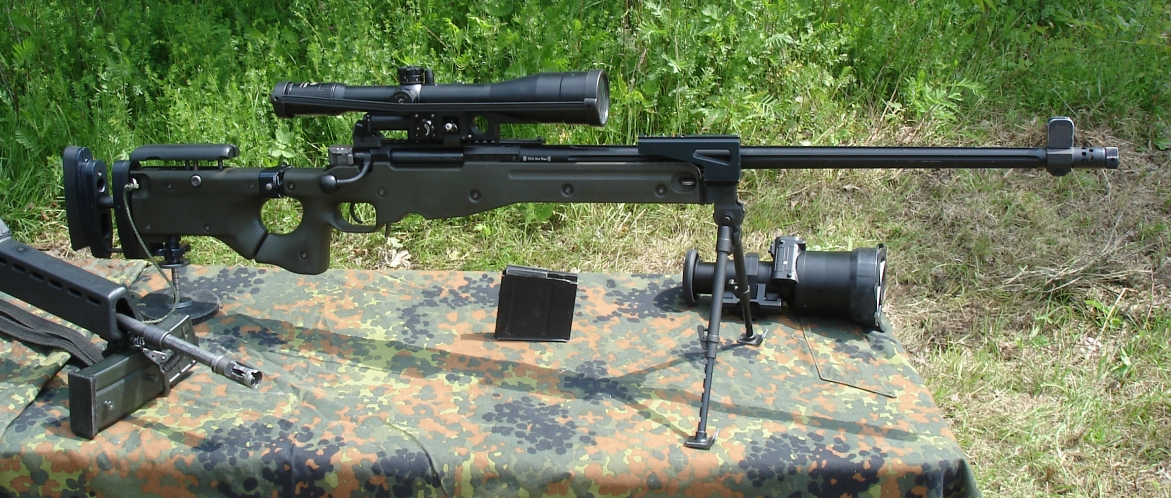
G22 of the German Army with a fluted barrel.

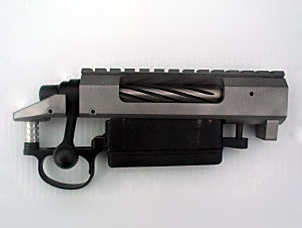
Closeup of PGW Timberwolf action with a helically fluted bolt.

Fluting is the removal of material from a cylindrical surface in a firearm, usually creating grooves. This is most often the barrel of a rifle, though it may also refer to the cylinder of a revolver or the bolt of a bolt action rifle. In contrast to rifle barrels and revolver cylinders, rifle bolts are normally helically fluted, though helical fluting is sometimes also applied to rifle barrels.

== Purpose ==
The main purpose of fluting is to reduce weight, although it can instead be used to increase rigidity or surface area (to make the barrel less susceptible to overheating) for a given total weight. However, for a given diameter, while a fluted barrel may cool more quickly, a non-fluted barrel will be stiffer and be able to absorb a larger amount of total heat, at the price of additional total weight.<

== Barrel Chamber ==
Fluted and non-fluted chamber in a blowback firearm

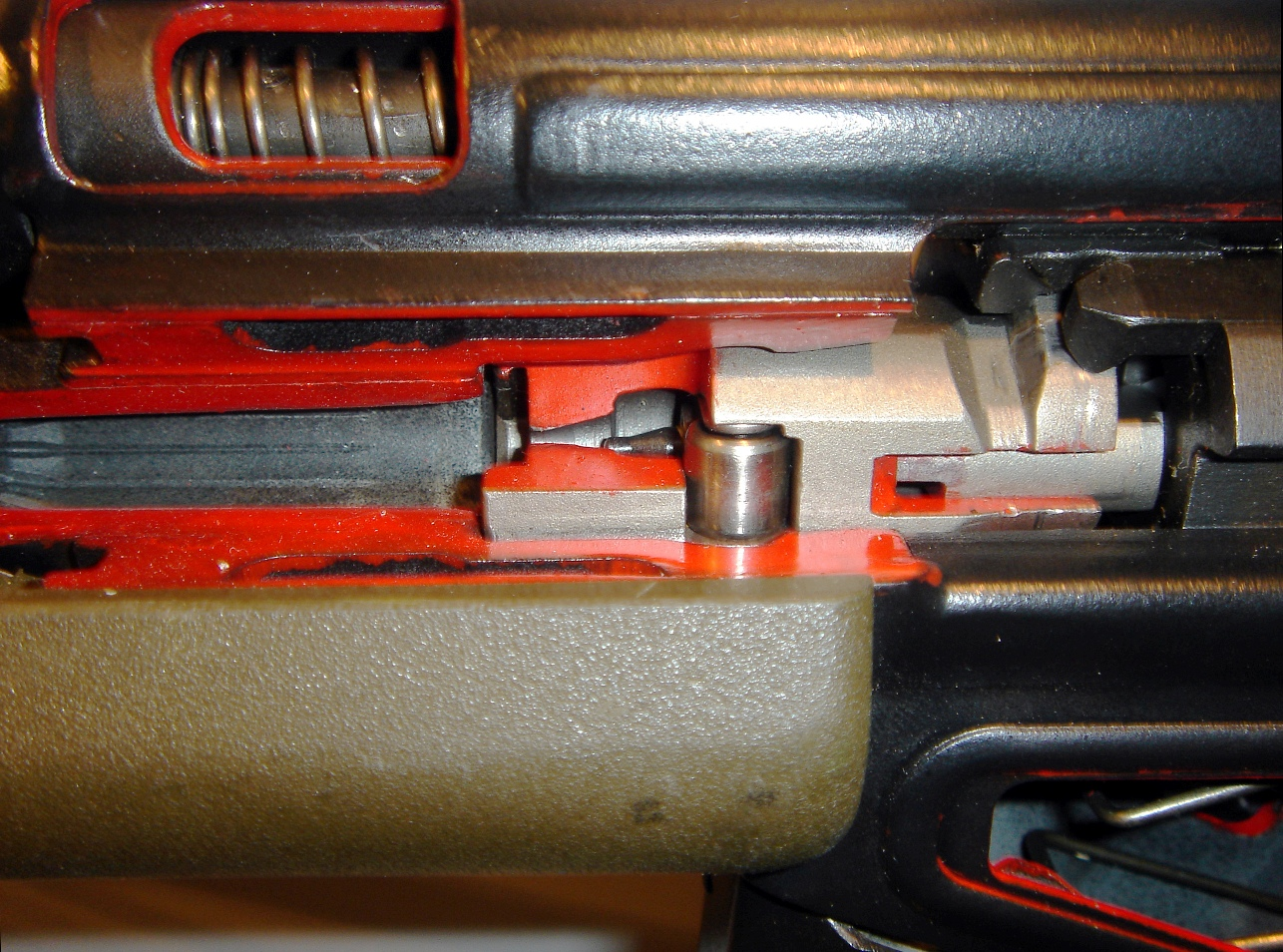
Cutaway model of the chamber with gas relief flutes (left) and roller-delayed action of the G3 battle rifle

In the barrel chamber, fluting refers to gas relief flutes/grooves used to ease the extraction of cartridges. They may also come in annular and helical forms. Notable firearms using fluted chambers are the roller-delayed blowback Heckler & Koch G3 and lever-delayed blowback FAMAS and AA-52.

Roller or lever-delayed blowback arms require that the bolt starts moving while the bullet is still in the barrel and the spent case is fully pressurized. Fluting the end of the chamber allows combustion gasses to float the neck and front of the cartridge case, providing pressure equalization between the front outer surface of the cartridge case and its interior. The roller-delayed blowback StG 45(M) assault rifle prototypes proved pressure equalization fluting is desirable, since the breech of roller or lever-delayed blowback arms is opened whilst under very high internal cartridge case pressure that presses a spent (bloated) cartridge casing against the chamber walls, which can cause significant problems during the cartridge extraction phase. Using traditionally cut (non-fluted) chambers in the StG 45(M) resulted in separated cartridge case heads during testing.

== Fluted firing pins ==
A fluted firing pin uses flutes that are machined into the striking tips is to speed up lock time and mostly for safety reasons. This can divert high pressure gasses if the primer is punctured reducing the possibility of a breech explosion. A fluted firing pin is less likely to get stuck in the forward position out the bolt face due to dirt/residue causing slam fire exploding out of battery. Fluting channels out dirt/residue from the weapons operation preventing jamming etc and increases reliability. Another reason for fluting firing pins can speed up lock time (the delay from trigger pull to primer strike) and additional benefits such as lighter weight reducing friction/inertia for faster striking, movement, spring cycle, durability, smoother operation which can overall increase accuracy and handling. Fluted firing pins are common in competition rifles with examples such as the Remington 700.

== See also ==
- Freebore
- Squeeze bore
- Tapering (firearms)
