= M24 Sniper Weapon System =

Bolt action sniper rifle

Rifle, Caliber 7.62 mm, Sniper Weapon System, M24
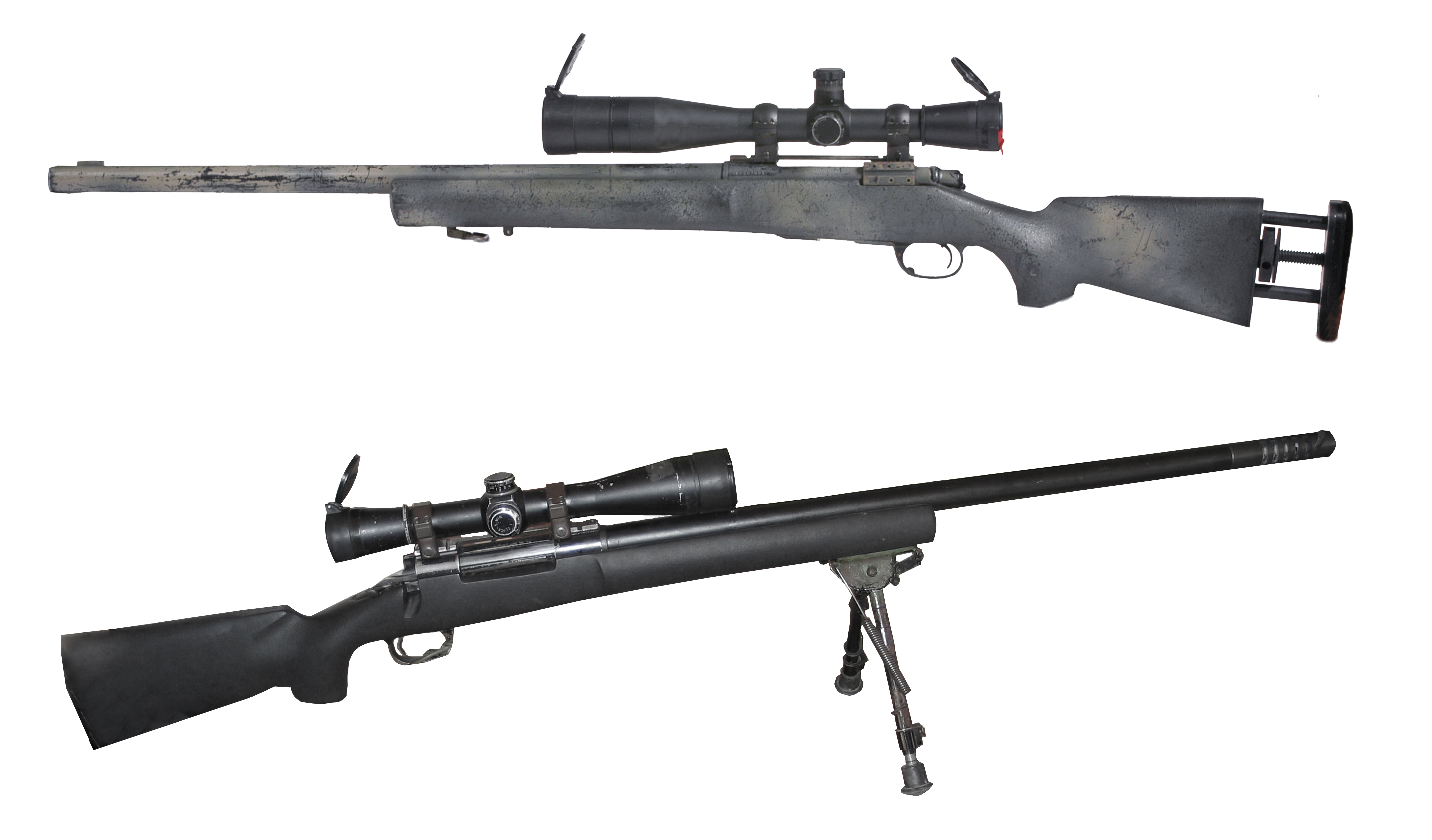
- The M24 rifle
- Type: Sniper rifle
- Place of origin: United States

Service history
- In service: 1988–present
- Used by: See Users
- Wars: Salvadoran Civil War; Gulf War; War in Afghanistan (2001–2021); Iraq War; Syrian Civil War; War in Iraq (2013–2017)

Production history
- Designed: 1988
- Manufacturer: Remington Arms
- Produced: 1988 – mid 2010s
- Variants: M24A2, M24A3, M24E1

Specifications
- Mass: 5.4 kg (12 lb) empty, without scope (M24); 7.3 kg (16 lb) with optical sight, sling swivels, carrying strap, fully loaded magazine 5.6 kg (12 lb) empty, without scope (M24A3).
- Length: 1,092 mm (43.0 in) (M24A1, M24A2); 1,181 mm (46.5 in) (M24A3)
- Barrel length: 610 mm (24 in) (M24A1, M24A2); 685.8 mm (27.00 in) (M24A3)
- Cartridge: 7.62×51mm NATO (M24, M24A2); .338 Lapua Magnum (M24A3)
- Action: Bolt-action
- Rate of fire: 20 rounds/min
- Muzzle velocity: 2,580 ft/s (790 m/s) w/M118LR Sniper load (175 gr.)
- Effective firing range: 800 metres (875 yd) (7.62×51mm); 1,500 metres (1,640 yd) (.338 Lapua Magnum)
- Maximum firing range: Estimated 4,400 metres (4,812 yd) w/M118LR Sniper load (175 gr.)
- Feed system: 5-round internal magazine (M24), 5-round, 10-round detachable box magazine (M24A2, M24A3)
- Sights: Telescopic; detachable backup iron sights

The M24 Sniper Weapon System (SWS) or M24 is the military and police version of the Remington Model 700 rifle, M24 being the model name assigned by the United States Army after adoption as their standard sniper rifle in 1988. The M24 is referred to as a "weapon system" because it consists of not only a rifle, but also a detachable telescopic sight and other accessories.

The M24 SWS has the "long action" bolt version of the Remington 700 receiver but is chambered for the 7.62×51mm NATO "short action" cartridge that has an overall length of 2.750 inches (69.85 mm). The "long action" allows the rifle to be re-configured for dimensionally larger cartridges up to 3.340 inches (84.84 mm) in overall length.

The M24 originally came tapped for the Leupold Ultra M3A 10×42mm fixed-power scope, which came with a circle-shaped mil-dot glass-etched reticle. This was later replaced in 1998 by the Leupold Mk 4 LR/T M1 10×40mm fixed-power scope with an elongated-shaped mil-dot wire reticle. The rifle also comes with a detachable Harris 9–13" 1A2-LM or Harris 9–13" 1A2-L bipod unit.

The M24 SWS was to be replaced with the M110 Semi-Automatic Sniper System, a contract awarded to Knight's Armament Company. However, the Army still continued to acquire M24s from Remington until February 2010 and upgraded to the A2 and M24E1 standard in many cases, continuing to serve. The Army chose to upgrade all its M24 rifles in the arsenals to the M2010 Enhanced Sniper Rifle, with the final M24 being converted in April 2014.

== Specifications ==
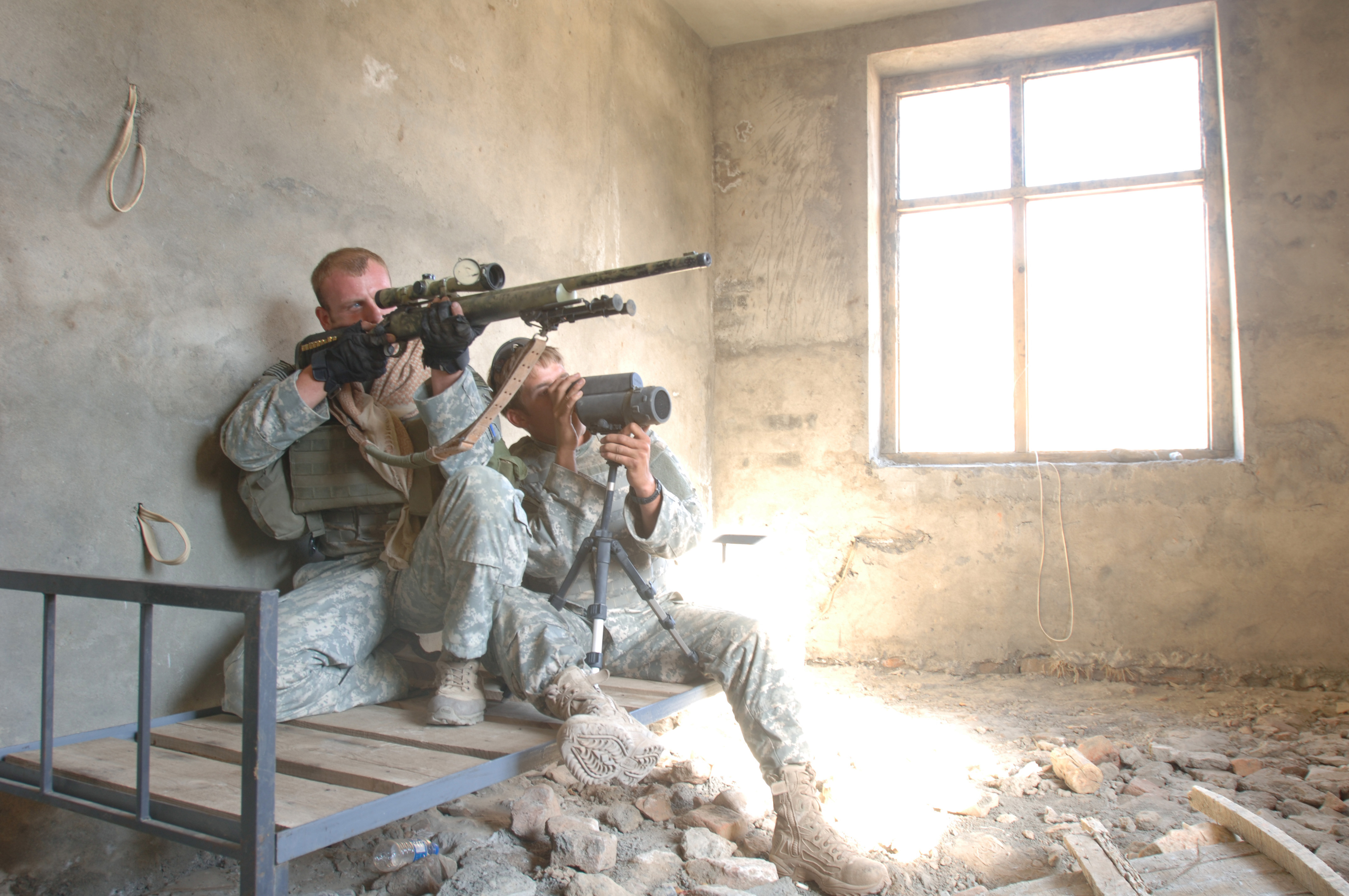
U.S. Army sniper team with the M24 SWS

Scope: Leupold Ultra M3A 10×42mm fixed power, or Leupold Mk 4 LR/T M3 10×40mm fixed power scope. Detachable emergency Redfield-Palma International back-up iron sights, they are attached to iron sight bases that are screwed into drilled and tapped holes machined into the front of the barrel and back on the left side of the receiver. In 2001 when Remington had the second contract to the US military, minor changes were done to the M24. These changes included two piece Leupold Mark 4 scope ring bases instead of the one piece on the first series rifles, and a switch from Redfield-Palma International iron sights to another manufacturer OK Weber. Redfield was out of business by then, necessitating a change.

Barrel: Made of 416R stainless steel. The bore twist is 1-turn-in-11.25 inches [1:285.75 mm] and the rifling is five radial lands and grooves (5-R) with a right-hand (RH) twist. Because of the odd number of lands, none of the lands are 180° apart, i.e. in direct opposition. This results in less bullet deformation, which (at least in theory) produces more consistent point of impact. In 5-R rifling, the "side" of the land is cut at a 65° angle, rather than 90° in conventional rifling. This results in less barrel fouling, and more consistent point of impact, compared to conventional rifling when relatively high numbers of rounds are fired between cleaning, as might be expected in military applications.

Stock: H-S Precision PST-024, the model with the fixed cheek piece, adjustable LOP and hinged floorplate. The stock secures the action via an aluminum bedding block to keep it rigid. The barrel is free floating. A twin-strut extension that pulls out of the butt allows a 2-inch (51 mm) adjustment to length-of-pull, as well as allowing for the weapon to fit inside the M-1950 Weapon Container for Airborne Operations. This is effected by a thick wheel on a central grooved pillar for adjusting the length and a thin locking ring behind it locks the thick wheel in place. The stock is primarily made from a polymer foam reinforced with fiberglass, carbon fiber, and Kevlar to reduce weight and then painted with a heavy duty polane paint. They were rigorously tested before being approved by Remington and the military.

Accuracy: According to MIL-R-71126(AR), 3.15.7 Targeting and Accuracy, The rifle shall achieve the dispersion set forth below when fired from a Government approved machine rest. The average mean radius shall be less than or equal to the values stated below. The minimum rate of fire for conducting this test shall be three rounds per minute.

Range / Average Mean Radius (AMR) — Mean Radius (MR) expresses the average distance of all the shots from the center of the shot group. AMR averages the MR of several shot groups.

- 200 yards (183 m): 1.3 inches
- 273 yards (250 m): 1.4 inches
- 300 yards (274 m): 1.9 inches

The radial distance from the calculated center of impact of the first target compared to the calculated center of impacts of the subsequent targets shall be less or equal to 1.086 MOA (3.3 inches @ 300 yards, 2.2 inches @ 200 yards, 2.4 inches @ 200 meters) on an average basis.

The actual rifle requirements for accuracy were .35 MOA from a machine rest and according to Major John Mende (ret.), this accuracy had to be maintained to 10,000 rounds. He stated, "Interesting side note was there was a 10,000 round requirement for the barrel to maintain the original accuracy. In fact after some 10,000 round tests we discovered the accuracy improved. A few barrels were tested past 20,000 and accuracy never went below the original accuracy requirement."

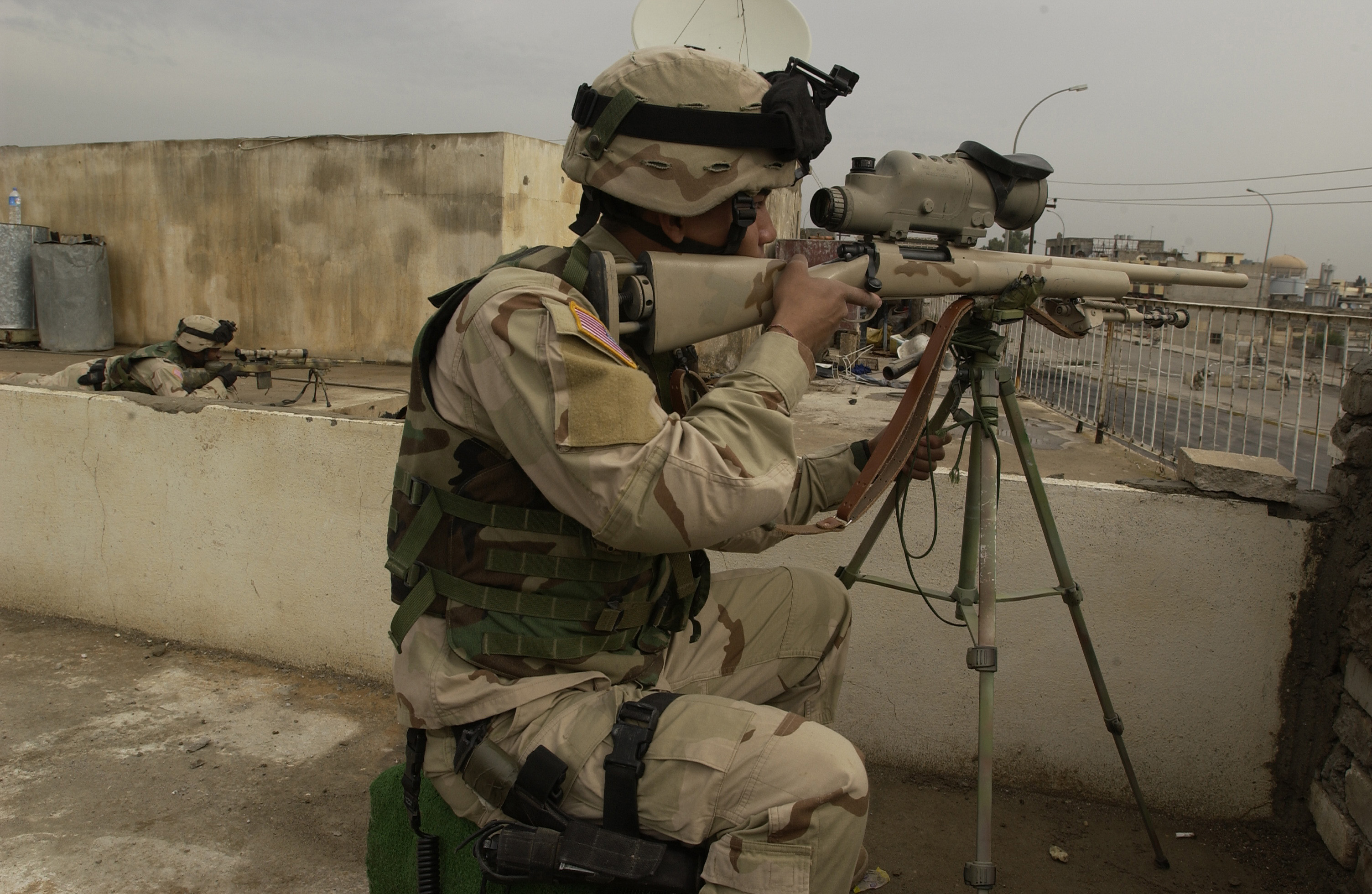
M24 SWS equipped with an AN/PVS-10 Sniper Night Sight (SNS)

Maximum effective range is given as 800 meters (875 yd), but record shots have been made with the M24 at over 1,000 meters (1,094 yd). Meanwhile, the standard optical sight has a maximum elevation adjustment of 1,000 meters (1,094 yd).

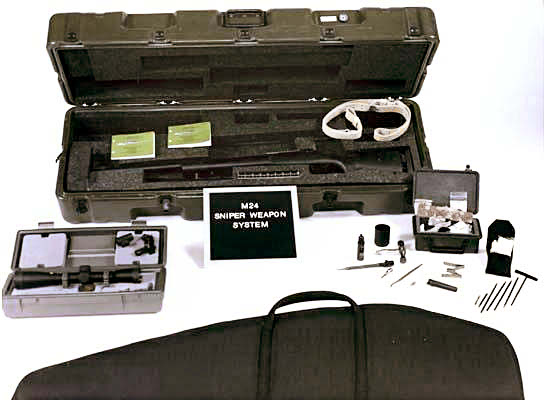
M24 SWS components (U.S. Army photo)

== M24 variants ==
=== XM24A1 ===
An experimental variant re-chambered for the .300 Winchester Magnum (7.62×67mm) round. It was not adopted by the US Army due to concerns that operators would not be able to acquire the special ammo. Also, the available .300 Winchester Magnum ammo that was procured sometimes misfired due to incompletely-burned propellant in the longer cartridge. Redick Arms Development further researched this concept, which eventually grew into the RAD M91A1 (7.62x51mm NATO) and M91A2 (.300 Winchester Magnum). These rifles were adopted by the US Navy SEALs.

=== M24A2 ===
Remington has developed an improved version of the M24 rifle, known as the M24A2. The A2 model features a detachable 5-round magazine, top-mounted and adjustable side-mounted Picatinny rails (advertised by Remington as "MARS", or Modular Accessory Rail System), barrel modifications designed to accommodate a sound suppressor, and an improved H-S Precision PST-026 stock with adjustable cheek height and length of pull. Existing M24s can also be converted into M24A2s, which replaces the stock and adds the new detachable magazine feed. The conversion requires a re-barreling of the weapon so it can take the OPS silencer.

=== M24A3 ===
Remington developed the M24A3 SWS, a variant of the M24 chambered for the .338 Lapua Magnum round (8.58×70mm) and feeding from a 5-round detachable box magazine. It comes tapped for the Leupold Mk 4 M1LR/T 8.5–25×50mm Variable Power day scope. It can also use detachable front and rear Back-Up Iron Sights in an emergency (BUIS units are standard accessories that can be fitted to the Picatinny Rail that runs on the top of the receiver and along the barrel).

=== U.S. Army 2009 solicitation for an M24 reconfiguration ===
The U.S. Army put out a solicitation in May 2009 for reconfiguring M24 Sniper Weapon Systems currently available in Army inventory consisting of a:

- Rebarreling/rechambering the SWS's barrel optimized to accommodate Mk 248 (DODIC A191) .300 Winchester Magnum ammunition.
- Replacement of existing weaver rails with a MIL-STD-1913 rail capable of accommodating both a day optic and in-line forward mounted, AN/PVS-26 (NSN 5855-01-538-8121) image intensified (I2) night vision device.
- Reconfiguring the stock with a stock that incorporates a detachable box magazine, adjustable comb and length of pull.
- Addition of a detachable sound suppressor as well as any necessary barrel modifications required for a sound suppressor interface.
- Replacement of the existing day optic sight (DOS) and rings with an Army specified variable power day optic and compatible rings.

The US government purchased MK 248 MOD 1 .300 Winchester Magnum match-grade ammunition in 2009 for use in .300 Winchester Magnum sniper rifles like the U.S. Navy MK 13 MOD 5 rifle or reconfigured M24 SWSs. This ammunition was developed as a .300 Winchester Magnum Match Product Improvement (PIP) and uses the 14.26 g (220 gr) Sierra MatchKing Hollow Point Boat Tail (HPBT) very-low-drag bullet fired at a nominal muzzle velocity of 869 metres per second (2,850 ft/s) ± 15.2 metres per second (50 ft/s). According to the U.S. Navy, this ammunition should increase the maximum effective range of .300 Winchester Magnum sniper rifle systems to 1,370 m (1,500 yd), decrease wind deflection on bullets in flight and use a reduced muzzle flash propellant that remains temperature stable across an operational temperature range of −32 to 74 °C (−26 to 165 °F).

=== 2010 M24E1 Enhanced Sniper Rifle reconfiguration competition ===
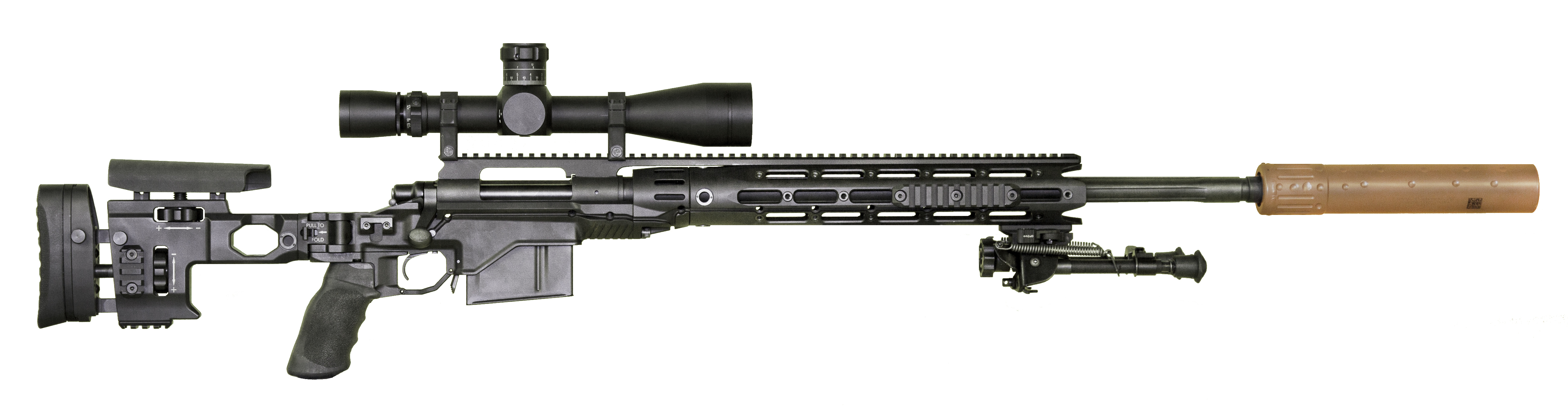
M24E1/XM2010 reconfigured Sniper Weapon System chambered in .300 Winchester Magnum

In September 2010, the United States Army's Joint Munitions and Lethality Contracting Center awarded Remington a Firm Fixed Price Indefinite Delivery/Indefinite Quantity contract (W15QKN-10-R-0403) for the upgrade of up to 3,600 M24 Sniper Weapon Systems currently fielded to the Army pending type classification as the M24E1 Enhanced Sniper Rifle (ESR). Later, the Enhanced Sniper Rifle was classified as the XM2010. The major configuration change for this system is the conversion from 7.62×51mm NATO to dimensionally larger .300 Winchester Magnum ammunition exploiting the M24's "long action" bolt to provide additional precision and range.

The M24E1/XM2010 is considered a "total conversion upgrade", by which the barrel, stock, magazines, muzzle brake, suppressor, and even the optics will be changed. Besides the rechambering and rebarreling with a 610 mm (24 in) long, 254 mm (1 in 10 inch) twist rate (5R) hammer-forged barrel the main reconfiguration changes compared to 7.62×51mm NATO chambered M24 rifles are:

- Fitting a new chassis (stock) assembly, which maximizes the amount of physical adjustments for the sniper to provide a better user customized fit. The chassis has a folding buttstock that shortens the system for easier transport and better concealment during movement and accommodates the mounting of accessories via removable MIL-STD-1913 Picatinny Rails.
- Fitting a 5-round detachable box magazine.
- Fitting a quick-attachable/detachable Advanced Armament Corp. sound suppressor with muzzle brake.
- Fitting a Leupold Mark 4 6.5–20×50mm ER/T M5 Front Focal variable power telescopic sight featuring a 30 mm tube diameter, first focal plane Horus Vision H-37 grid system range estimation reticle and Bullet Drop Compensation.
- Applying advanced corrosion resistant coatings throughout the system.

According to Remington Arms, each rifle is tested to meet (and typically exceeds) the requirement to fire ≤ 1 MOA (less than a 2-inch shot group at 200 yards) before being released for fielding.

Based on the results and feedback from troops, the U.S. Army decided in May 2011 to replace its entire fleet of M24s, ordering a total of 2,558 M2010 Enhanced Sniper Rifles. By September 2012, the Army had fielded more than 1,400 systems as part of an urgent material release. The M2010 achieved Type Classification-Standard in July 2013 and Full Materiel Release in September 2013, supporting procurement for the balance of the Army requirement. On April 25, 2014, the 2,558th M2010 Enhanced Sniper Rifle was completed.

=== IDF modernized M24 ===
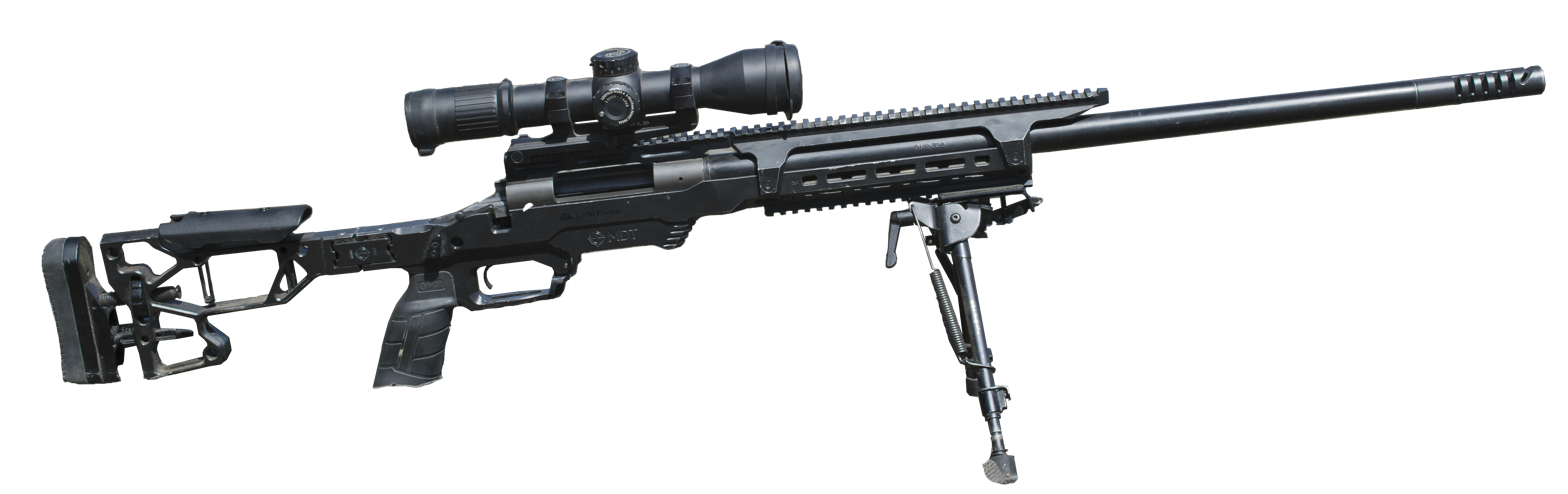
IDF modernized M24 SWS

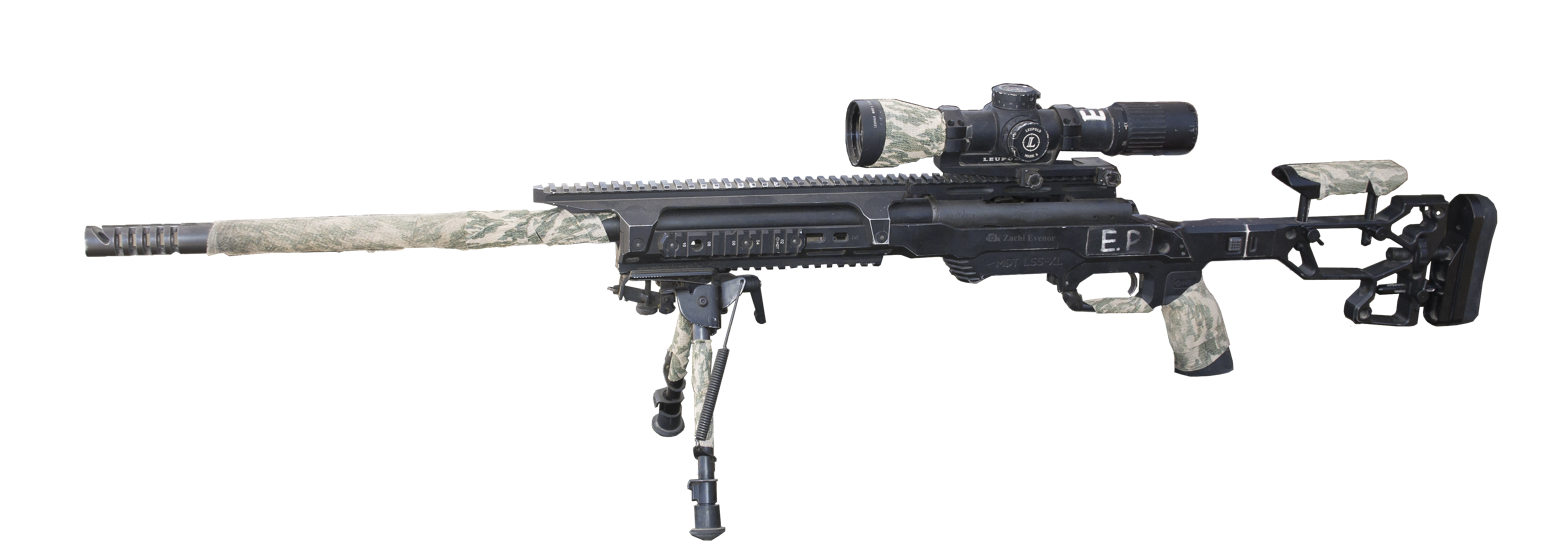
IDF modernized M24 SWS

In 2019, the Israel Defense Forces started to upgrade the M24 and replace the stock and receiver of the old M24 rifles with a modern MDT Defense M24 Chassis stock assembly with AR15/M16 pistol grip that increases the number of physical adjustments to individual ergonomic preferences, magazine feeding and an M-LOK forend with attachable MIL-STD-1913 Picatinny rails around the barrel. The modernized M24 entered service in 2021.

== Differences between M24 and M40 ==
The U.S. Marine Corps also uses the Remington 700/40x action as the basis for its M40 Sniper Weapon System. The primary difference between the U.S. Army and the U.S. Marine Corps rifles is that while the U.S. Marine Corps M40 variants use the short-action version of the Remington 700/40x (which is designed for shorter cartridges such as the .308 Winchester/7.62×51 mm NATO), the U.S. Army M24 uses the Remington 700 Long Action. Despite the fact that the M24 comes fitted with a 7.62×51mm NATO barrel upon issue, retaining the longer action allows them to reconfigure the rifle in dimensionally larger cartridge chamberings if necessary (which has been the case during the longer engagement distances during Operation Enduring Freedom). Long actions also increase reliability and reduce jamming by reducing the angle of cartridges leaving the magazine and permit long, low-drag heavy-for-caliber bullets to be loaded in short-action cartridges that otherwise would not fit in short-action cartridges, magazines and receivers.

The U.S. Army reconfigured their M24 rifles to M2010 Enhanced Sniper Rifles rechambering the original M24 rifles to .300 Winchester Magnum. The USMC M40A3 uses a 25 inches (635 mm) Schneider barrel and the U.S. Army M24 used a 24 inches (610 mm) Rock Creek 5R barrel.

== Users ==
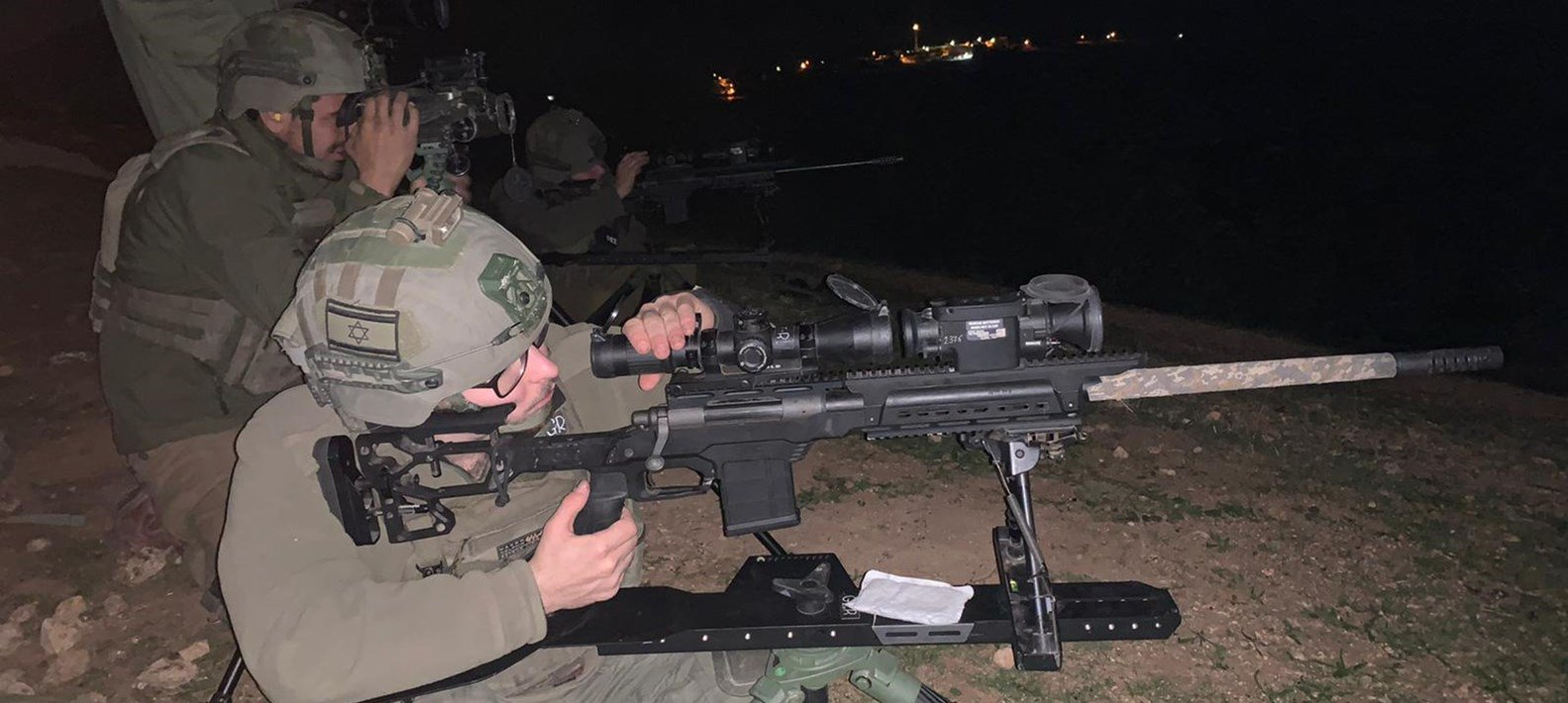
Israel Defense Forces snipers with the modernized M24 SWS

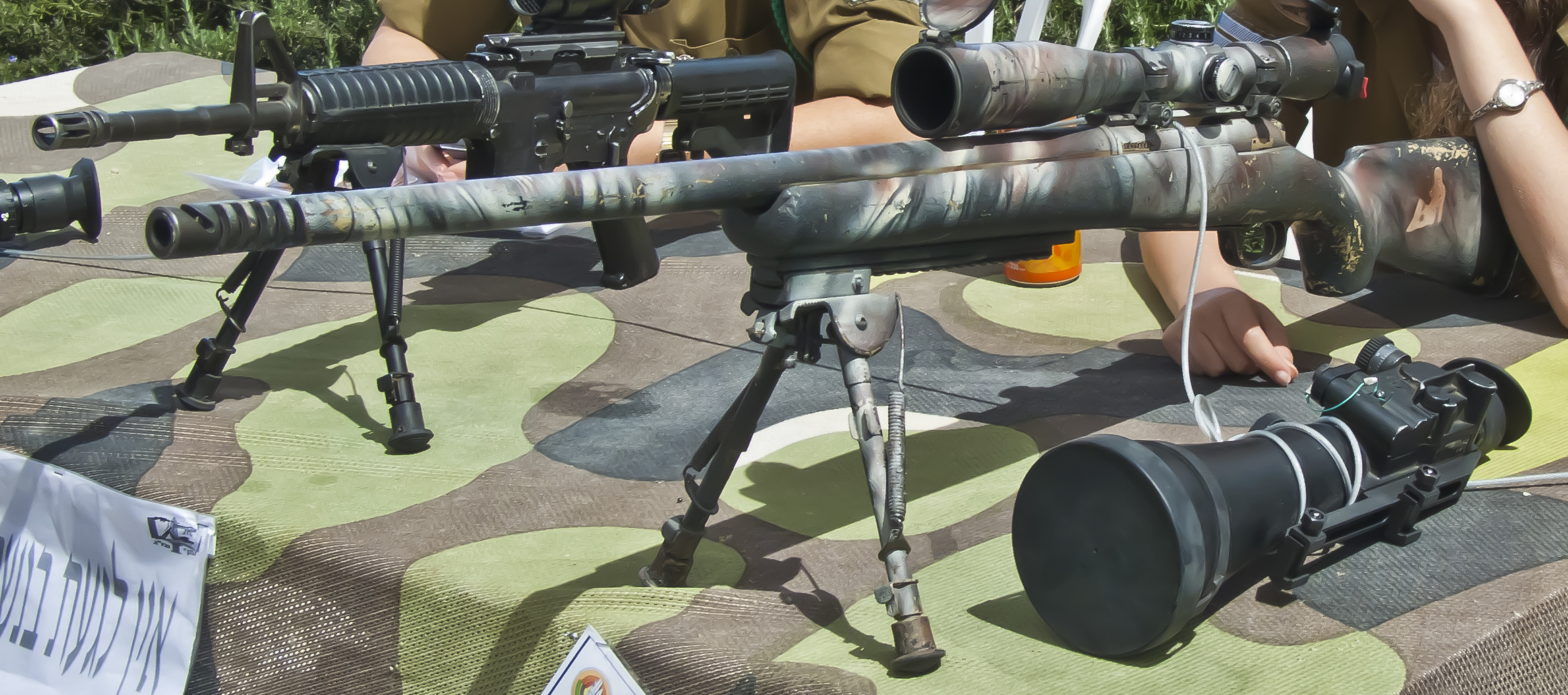
IDF M24 sniper rifle, colored in camouflage scheme

- Algeria: Used by the People's National Army.
- Brazil: Used by Brazilian Special Operations Brigade and BOPE.
- Colombia: Used by the Colombian Army, Colombian Navy and Colombian Air Force.
- El Salvador
- Georgia
- Hungary: Bercsény László Különleges Műveleti Zászlóalj
- Iraq: Iraqi Army, Iraqi special forces and Popular Mobilisation Units.
- Israel: Israel Defense Forces
- Japan: Used by Japan Ground Self-Defense Force (JGSDF) snipers, the paratroopers of the 1st Airborne Brigade, and the Special Forces Group as its main sniper rifle. Being replaced by the HK G28.
- Kosovo
- Lebanon
- Mexico: Cuerpo de Fuerzas Especiales and Federal Police of Mexico
- Philippines: Philippine Army and Philippine Marine Corps
- Ukraine: Part of the United States military aid.
- United States: Used by the United States Army and United States Air Force. Also used by various police SWAT teams.

=== Former users ===
- Islamic Republic of Afghanistan: Standard issue sniper rifle of the Afghan National Army.

=== Non-state actors ===
- Islamic State: Used by Islamic State (ISIL) fighters in the Philippines as captured weapons.

== See also ==
- List of individual weapons of the U.S. Armed Forces
- List of crew-served weapons of the U.S. Armed Forces
