= M40 rifle =

Sniper rifle

M40
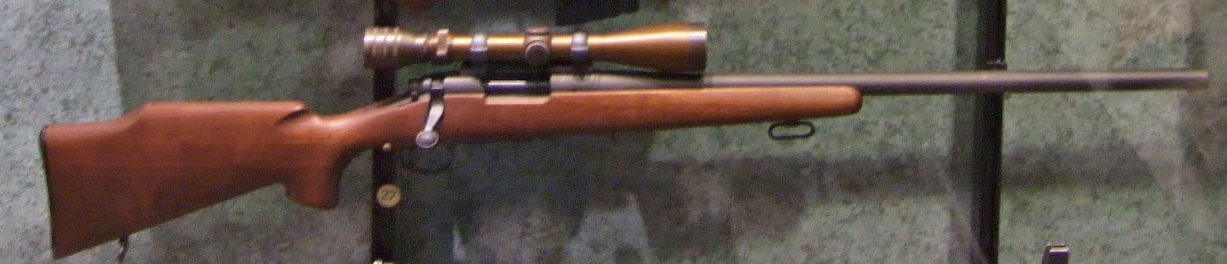
- The M40 sniper rifle
- Type: Sniper rifle
- Place of origin: United States

Service history
- In service: 1966–present
- Used by: United States
- Wars: Vietnam War; Lebanese Civil War; Invasion of Grenada; Gulf War; War in Afghanistan; Iraq War

Production history
- Designer: Remington Arms
- Designed: 1966
- Produced: 1966–present
- Variants: M40A1; M40A3; M40A5

Specifications
- Mass: M40A1: 6.57 kg (14.48 lb); M40A3: 7.5 kg (16.5 lb)
- Length: M40A1: 1,117 mm (43.97 in); M40A3: 1,124 mm (44.25 in)
- Barrel length: 635 mm (25 in) (1:12 right hand twist); M40A1: Hart (6 lands and grooves); M40A3: Schneider Match Grade SS No. 7 (6 lands and grooves)
- Cartridge: 7.62×51mm NATO
- Action: Bolt action
- Muzzle velocity: 777 m/s (2,550 ft/s) (w/175 gr. M118LR)
- Effective firing range: 800 meters/875 yards
- Feed system: 5-round integral box magazine (M40, M40A1, M40A3); 10-round removable box magazine (M40A5)
- Sights: Scout Sniper Day Scope (SSDS)—Schmidt and Bender PM II 3–12×50.

The M40 rifle is a bolt-action sniper rifle used by the United States Marine Corps. It has had four variants: the M40, M40A1, M40A3, and M40A5. The M40 was introduced in 1966. The changeover to the A1 model was completed in the 1970s, the A3 in the 2000s, and the A5 in 2009.

Each M40 is built from a Remington Model 700 bolt-action rifle, and is modified by USMC armorers at Marine Corps Base Quantico, using components from a number of suppliers. New M40A5s are being built, and A1s are upgraded to A3s and A5s as they rotate into the armory for service and repair. The rifles have had many sub-variations in telescopic sights, and smaller user modifications. The M40A5 incorporates a detachable magazine and a threaded barrel to allow for the use of a sound suppressor or another muzzle device.

The original M40 was a military type-classified version of the Remington 700; it was factory-made, and had a one-piece wooden stock. The M40A1 and A3 switched to fiberglass stocks made by McMillan, with new scopes. The trigger pull on both models (M40A1/A3) is 3 to 5 lb (1.4–2.3 kg).

In 2018, the Marine Corps retired their M40s, replacing them with the Mk 13 Mod 7.

== History ==
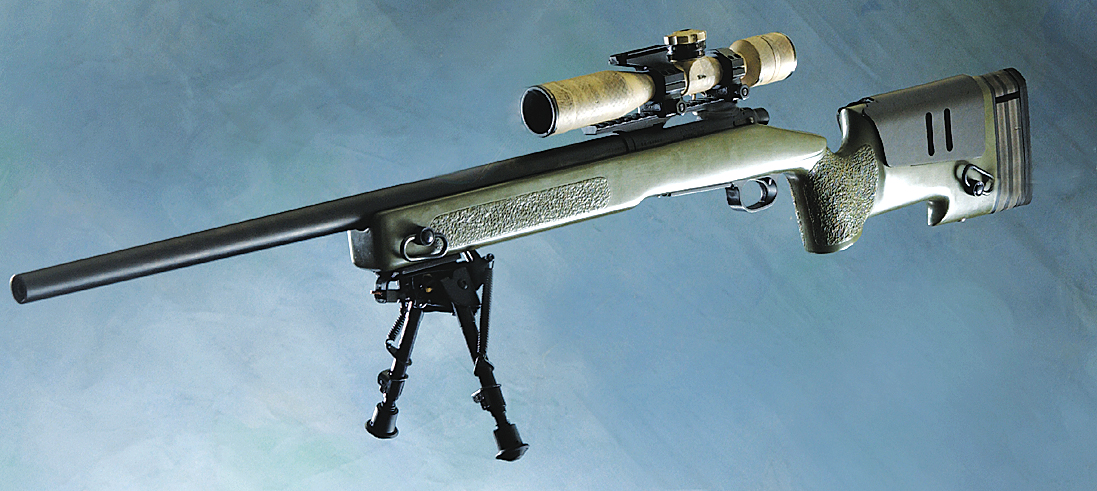
The M40A3

During the Vietnam War, the Marine Corps decided they needed a standard sniper rifle. After testing several possibilities, they ordered seven hundred Remington Model 40x rifles (target/varmint version of the Remington Model 700 bolt-action rifle), and gave them the M40 designation. Most had a Redfield 3–9x Accurange variable scope mounted. With time, certain weaknesses, primarily warping of the all-wood stock, became apparent.

Sometime in the early 1970s, the USMC armorers at MCB Quantico began rebuilding the original M40s into M40A1s. The process involved, among other improvements, replacing the original wood stocks with McMillan A1 fiberglass stocks, as well as replacing the original 3–9× Redfield variable-power scopes with 10× Unertl fixed-power scopes. The M40 was originally designed by Jack Cuddy and Gunner/Captain/CW04 Neil Warren Goddard. The stock featured Wichita sling swivels and a Pachmayr buttpad.

The Corps began looking at a replacement for the M40 series in 2004, but did not draft requirements until 2009 while working with SOCOM. The plans for a "21st century sniper rifle" were paused while the Army's results of SOCOM's Precision Sniper Rifle program were finalized in 2013. The Marine Corps eventually decided to continue upgrading the M40A-series and keep the 7.62 NATO round, primarily due to the higher cost of larger rounds and scout sniper training that can achieve kills beyond the weapon's effective range.

In April 2018, the U.S. Marine Corps announced they would be replacing the M40 with the Mk 13 Mod 7. The Mk 13 chambered in .300 Winchester Magnum increases range from 1,000 meters with the M40 to 1,300 meters, giving Marine snipers similar capabilities to the U.S. Army M2010 Enhanced Sniper Rifle.

== Variants ==
=== M40A3 ===
Development of the M40A3 began in 1996 and concluded in 2001, when it was placed into service during Operation Enduring Freedom. It served in Operation Iraqi Freedom and other subsequent conflicts. Though its designation would remain M40A3 until 2009, its exact configuration varied with time. Listed here is a description of the components used in the M40A3.

Action: The M40 has always been based on the Remington 700 Short Action with .308 bolt face, and this is no different in the M40A3. These actions are tuned by Marine armorers; the M40A1 trigger guard and floor plate was assembly manufactured by Winchester using the model 70 steel which was cut about one inch to fit the Remington 700 action and McMillan camo stock. DD Ross Company, though several M40A3s use Badger Ordnance trigger guards. In 2007, the Marine Corps began replacing the DD Ross trigger guard assemblies with the M5 detachable magazine trigger guard manufactured by Badger Ordnance.

Barrel: The barrel on the M40A1 was made by Bill Atkinson, this barrel is 24" long made from 416 stainless steel, bead blasted and blued with black oxide. M40A3 is a Schneider 635; 25-inch, 6-groove, 1:12" match-grade heavy barrel.

Stock: All service M40A3s are based upon the A4 Tactical Riflestock, a benchrest-style fiberglass riflestock made by McMillan Fiberglass Stocks and cast molded in an OD Green color. The action is glass bedded into the stock with aluminum pillars, while the barrel is allowed to "float" (it is attached only to the action), ensuring it is stress free during operation. The stock has adjustable length-of-pull (through a buttstock spacer system) and a Marine manufactured adjustable saddle-type cheekpiece. The stock also has six flush mount sling swivel cups, two on each side front and back and one each on the front and rear underside. One bipod stud is located on the underside of the forend.

Sling: The Model 1907 sling that has been historically used on M40A3s has been replaced with the Quick Cuff Model Two sling manufactured by Tactical Intervention Specialists.

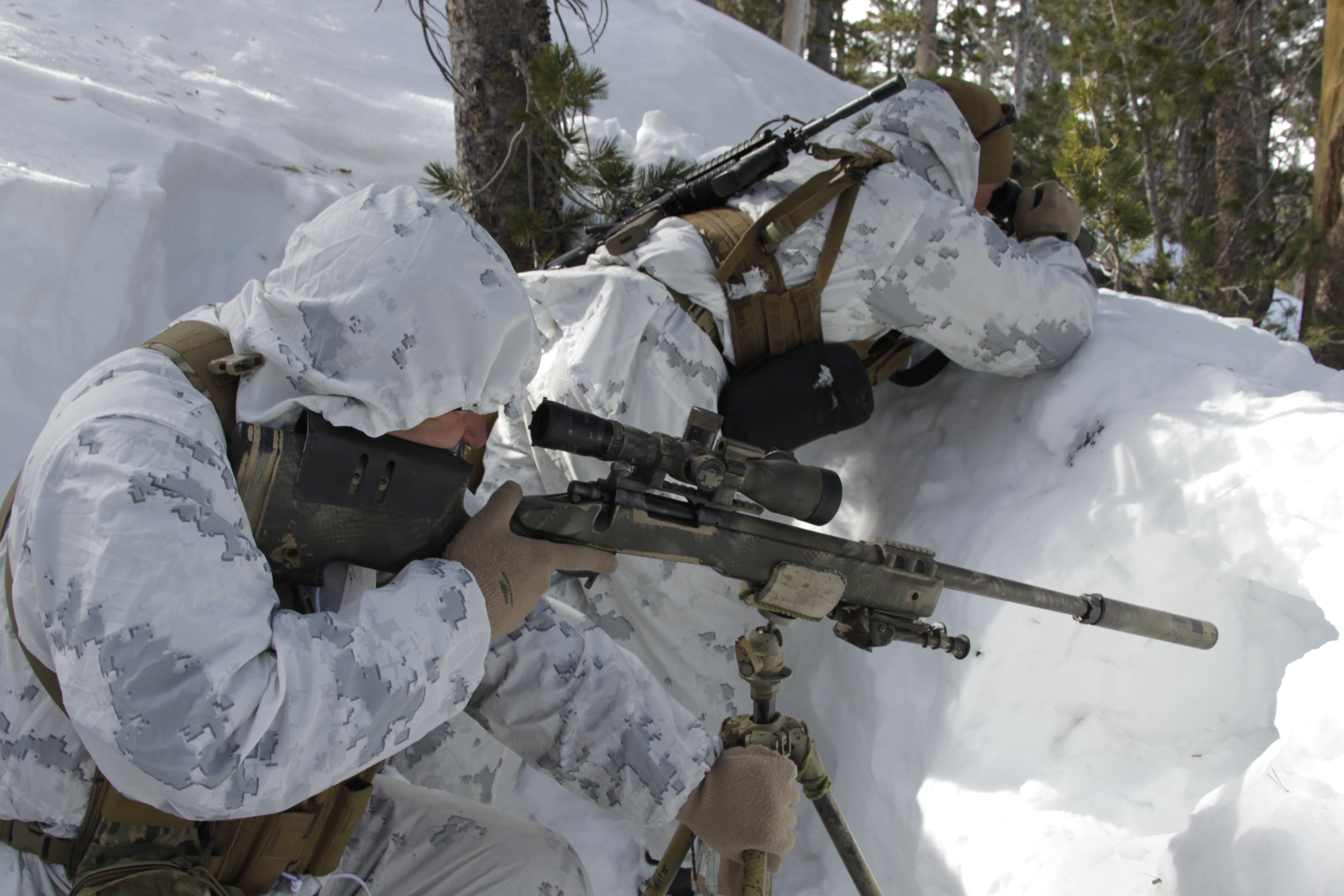
Snipers utilize an M40A5 with bipod and suppressor while training at the Mountain Warfare Training Center

Bipod: The M40A3s use a 6–9" Harris notched swivel type bipod, model S-BRM, with a KMW Pod-Loc, which is a push button ratcheting bipod swivel locking mechanism.

Dayscope: The M8541 Scout Sniper Day Scope is a Schmidt and Bender Police Marksman II LP 3–12×50 modified by Premier Reticles. Starting in 2007, this model replaced the Unertl MST-100 10× fixed day scope. This dayscope is mounted with Badger Ordnance USMC M40A3 34mm scope rings, which use a standard ring in the rear and a wider MAX-50 ring in front. The standard front ring cap is replaced with a SPA-Defense B634 34mm Male Dovetail, as a mounting platform for the Simrad KN200 Night Vision Weapon Sight. The scope and rings are mounted on a DD Ross 30-minute-of-angle lugged Picatinny rail.

=== M40A5 ===
The M40A5 superseded the M40A3 in 2009, though the evolution between the two systems occurred gradually over a longer period. The primary difference between the M40A5 and the M40A3 is the barrel: The A3's target crown has been replaced with a threaded muzzle and straight tapered barrel allowing the installation of a Surefire muzzle brake and sound suppressor. All M40A5s are fitted with a Badger Ordnance detachable magazine system and a forward rail mount for the AN/PVS-22 night vision optic.

=== Comparison ===
Differences
	M40A1	M40A3	M40A5
Weight (w/scope)	6.57 kg (14.45 lb)	7.5 kg (16.56 lb)	7.5 kg (16.56 lb)
Overall Length	1.117 m (44.0 in)	1.124 m (44.25 in)	1.124 m (44.25 in)
Barrel Length	(25 in)	(25 in)	(25 in)
Barrel	Hart	Schneider Match Grade Stainless-Steel USMC Barrel	Schneider Stainless-Steel
Lands and Grooves	6	6	6
Rifling	RH 1:304.8 mm (1–12")	RH 1:304.8 mm (1–12")	RH 1:304.8 mm (1–12")
Stock	McMillan HTG	McMillan Tactical A4	McMillan Tactical A4
Scope	Unertl 10×	Unertl 10× with US Optics upgrade Schmidt & Bender 3–12×50 M8541	Schmidt & Bender 3–12×50mm Police Marksman II LP scope

=== M40A6/A7 ===
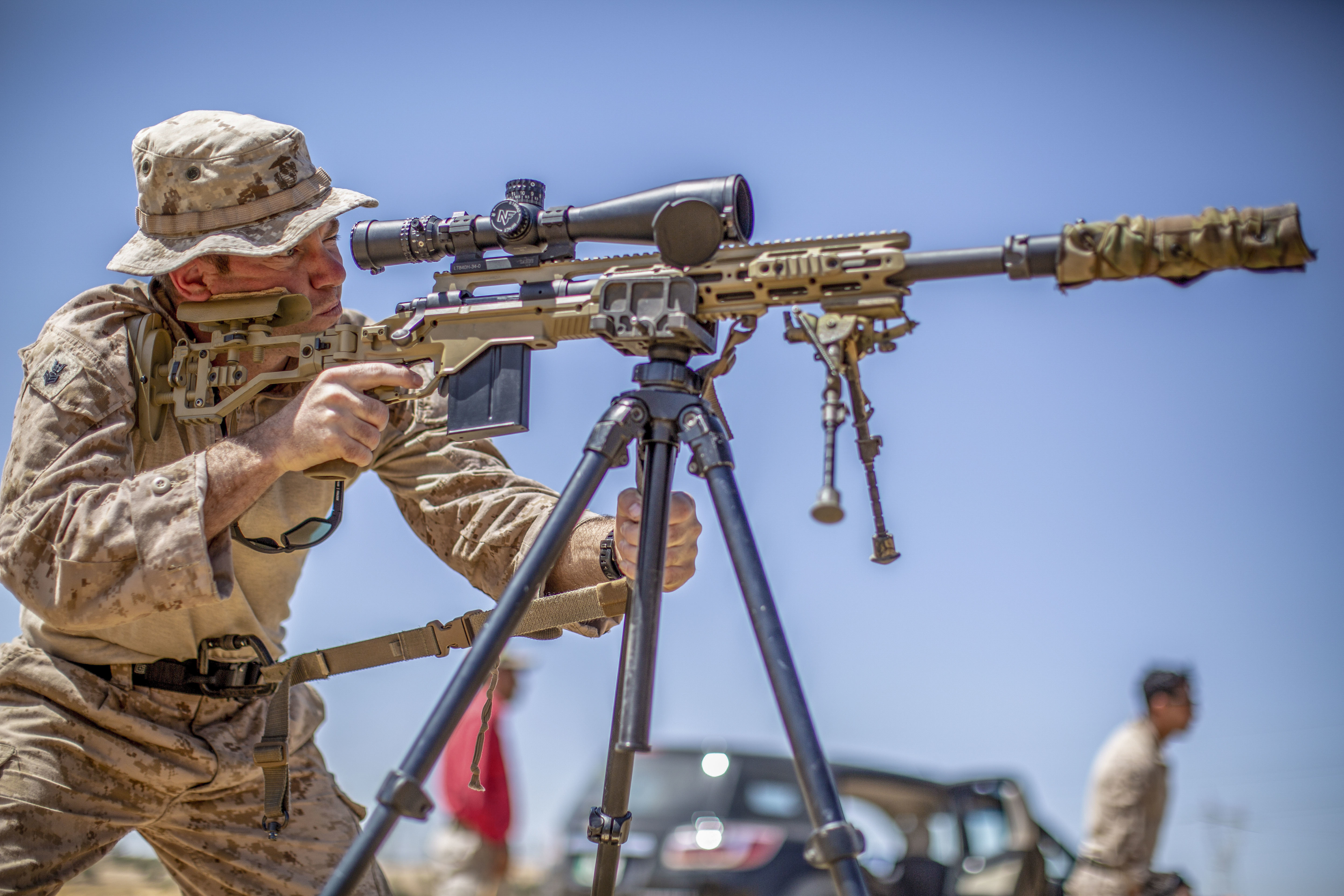
M40A6

On 25 July 2013, the Marine Corps released a solicitation for the M40 Modular Stock Program. Upgraded features are to include a folding stock, compatible with current M40 actions and barrels, to make the rifle more compact for transportation inside confined spaces like vehicles and a full-length rail to accommodate optics and accessories; the M40A5 has only a few inches of rail space beyond the scope for a night vision optic, so extending the rail length would allow more accessories to be attached, enabling snipers to put rounds on target under any conditions. Deliveries were to begin three months after the contract being awarded, with 1,100 stocks to be purchased to upgrade the entire M40A5 inventory. The resulting weapon from the program was originally to be re-designated the M40A6. Remington was awarded the contract in November 2014. The final product will be designated the M40A7 and was planned to be fielded by 2017. The M40A6 began fielding with Marine Corps in June 2016.

== Differences between M40 and M24 ==
The U.S. Army also used the Remington 700/40x action as the basis for its M24 Sniper Weapon System. The primary difference between the Army and the U.S. Marine Corps rifles is that while the U.S. Marine Corps M40 variants use the short-action version of the Remington 700/40x which is designed for cartridges having an overall length of 2.750 inches (69.85 mm) or less (such as the .308 Winchester/7.62×51 mm NATO), the Army M24 uses the Remington 700 Long Action. The long action of the M24 is designed for full-length cartridges up to 3.340 inches (84.84 mm) in overall length, such as the .30-06 Springfield, and magnum cartridges such as the 7 mm Remington Magnum and .300 Winchester Magnum, but shorter cartridges such as the 7.62×51mm NATO (the military version of the .308 Winchester) can also be used. The U.S. Army's use of the long action was the result of an original intention to chamber the M24 for .30-06 Springfield. Despite the fact that the M24 came fitted with a 7.62×51 mm NATO barrel upon issue, retaining the longer action allowed them to reconfigure the rifle in dimensionally larger cartridge chamberings if necessary (which has been the case during the longer engagement distances during Operation Enduring Freedom). In 2014 the last U.S. Army M24 rifles were reconfigured to M2010 Enhanced Sniper Rifles that are chambered for .300 Winchester Magnum. The barrels not currently fitted to the rifles are usually stored with the unit armorers. The U.S. Marine Corps M40A3 uses a 25 inches (635 mm) Schneider barrel and the U.S. Army M24 used a 24 inches (610 mm) Rock Creek 5R barrel.

== Users ==
- Afghanistan: The Afghan National Army received USMC-issued M40A5s.
- Malaysia: Used by PASKAL of the Royal Malaysian Navy
- Philippines: 85 M40A5s acquired by the Philippine Marine Corps, delivered in 2017. Several Remington M700P rifles converted to M40A3 standard. M40A5s used in the Siege of Marawi.
- United States: Used by United States Marine Corps

=== Others ===
- During the Iraqi insurgency, insurgents captured two M40A1s in June 2004 and then two M40A3s in August 2005 from U.S. Marines killed in action. In June 2006, one of the two initial M40A1s was recovered when an Iraqi sniper was killed by a USMC sniper.

== See also ==
- List of weapons of the U.S. Marine Corps
- List of individual weapons of the U.S. Armed Forces
