= Mk 13 rifle =

Sniper rifle

Mk 13
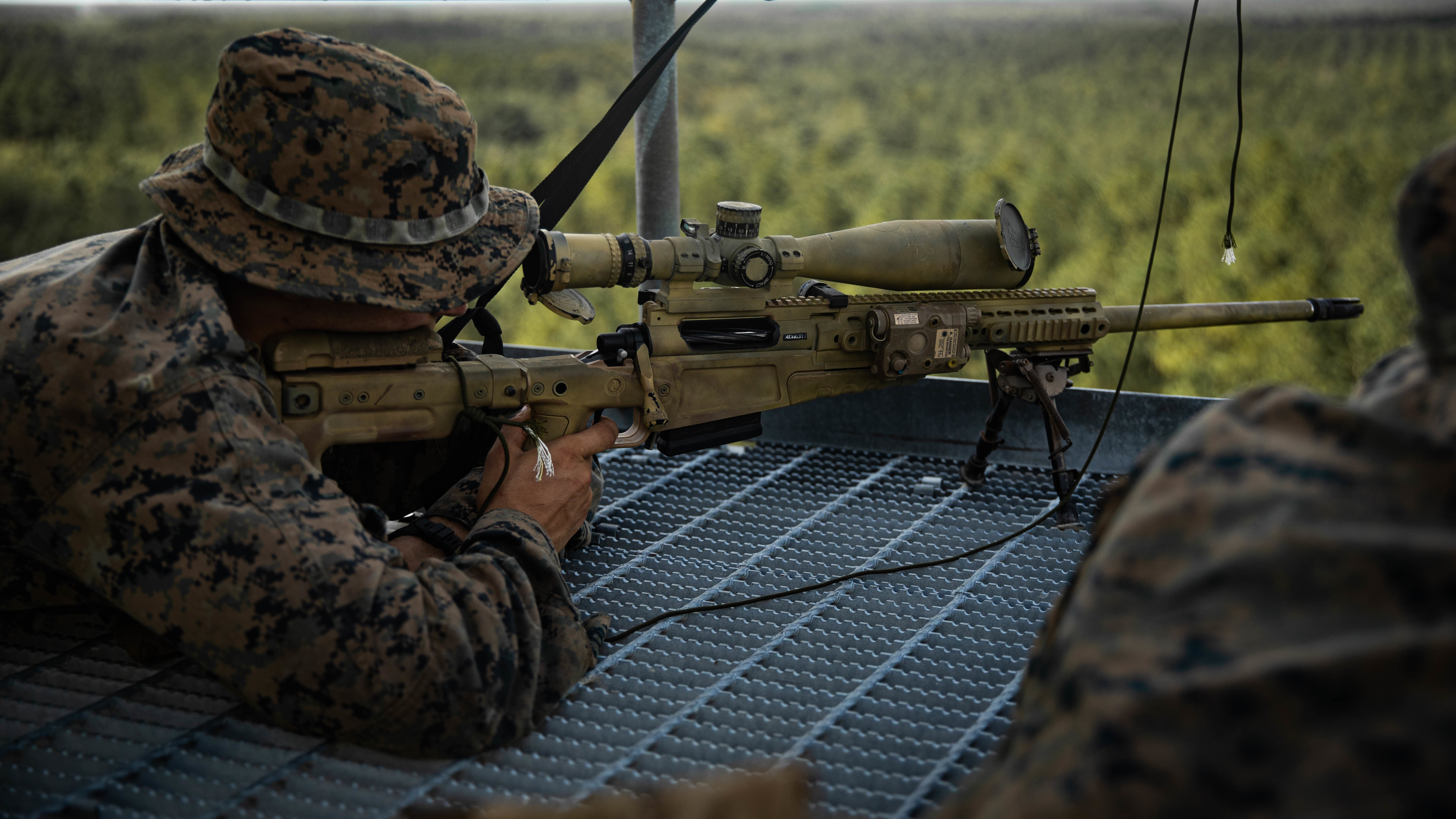
- The Mk 13 sniper rifle's Mod 7 variant during an exercise at Camp Lejeune, NC

Service history
- In service: 2001–present
- Used by: United States
- Wars: War in Afghanistan; Iraq War

Production history
- Designer: Accuracy International/Remington Arms
- Variants: Mk 13 MOD 5 Mk 13 MOD 7

Specifications
- Mass: 5.17 kg (11.4 lbs)
- Length: 1207 mm (47.5")
- Barrel length: 673 mm (26.5")
- Cartridge: .300 Winchester Magnum
- Caliber: .308
- Action: Bolt action
- Effective firing range: 1,300 meters (1,421 yd)
- Feed system: 5-round magazine (MOD 5)
- Sights: Nightforce Advanced Tactical Riflescope

The Mk 13 rifle is made using the Accuracy International Chassis System (AICS) version 2.0 mated to a long action Remington 700 receiver. The AICS 2.0 folding stock reduces the rifle's overall length by 210 mm (8.3 in) when folded and adds 0.2 kg (0.44 lb) to the rifle's total weight. The rifle has a cheekpiece design that adjusts sideways and for height for optimal cheek position when using night vision equipment or telescopic sights with large objective lenses. There is also a quick-adjust cheek-piece option that has a spring-loaded cheek-piece in conjunction with a quick-adjust butt plate. The side panels are made from a high-strength polymer and are available in the colors olive drab, dark earth or black. Sling attachment points are mounted on each side of the rifle, so it can be carried flat against the back and used comfortably by left- and right-handed users. A front attachment point is situated below the fore-end and can be used to anchor a target-style sling or replaced by an adapter for a Harris bipod.

== Mk 13 MOD 0 ==
The Mk 13 MOD 0 was formerly used by the US Navy SEALs. Little is known of its usage or technical data, and pictures are rarely available. The pictures that have been released show a Remington 700 Long-Action receiver mated to a McMillan A2 stock. The rifle was chambered in .300 Winchester Magnum. The rifle was the most prolific sniper weapon in the Navy until the advent of the Mk 13 Mod 5. The weapon is known to be used by Chris Kyle, Robert J. O'Neill, and Howard E. Wasdin.

== Mk 13 MOD 5 ==
The United States Special Operations Command uses the Mk 13 MOD 5 rifle chambered in .300 Winchester Magnum. The Mk 13 MOD 5 utilizes the "long-action" bolt of the Remington 700/M24 receiver and has a precision barrel that can be fitted with the suppressor of the Mk 11. It has a 3-sided Modular Accessory Rail System (MARS) for mounting optics on top and Picatinny rail accessories on each side, and a folding bipod. The Mk 13 was to be gradually replaced by the Mk 21 Precision Sniper Rifle in US Army use. However, it was decided that the Mk 21 did not conform to SOCOM requirements in 2018, and the program was re-competed with the Barrett MRAD selected in 2019 as the Mk 22 Advanced Sniper Rifle.

== Mk 13 MOD 7 ==
In April 2018, the U.S. Marine Corps announced they would be replacing the M40 sniper rifle with the Mk 13 MOD 7; the M40 had been in service with the Marines since 1966, with the latest M40A6 being upgraded in 2014. The Mk 13 with a Stiller Precision action chambered in .300 Winchester Magnum increases range from 1,000 meters with the M40 to 1,300 meters, giving Marine snipers similar capabilities to the U.S. Army M2010 Enhanced Sniper Rifle.

== Replacement ==
The Marine Corps plans to field the Barrett Firearms Manufacturing Mk 22 MRAD (multirole adaptive design) in 2021 for its Advanced Sniper Rifle (ASR) program to eventually replace the Mk 13 MOD 7; the Marines plan to buy 250 rifles. Able to be chambered in .300 Norma Magnum and .338 Norma Magnum, the Mk 22 can shoot 1,500 meters, several hundred meters further than the .300 Winchester Magnum-chambered Mk13 MOD 7.
