= Unertl =

Unertl may refer to:

== People ==
- Franz Xaver Josef von Unertl (1675–1750), Bavarian politician
- Jeremy Unertl (born 1978), American football player

== Other uses ==
- Unertl Optical Company, manufacturer of telescopic sights
