= M86 sniper rifle =

Bolt action sniper rifle manufactured by Harris Gunworks

The M86 sniper rifle is a bolt-action sniper rifle manufactured by Harris Gunworks (formerly Harris-McMillan Gunworks, formerly G. McMillan & Co.). It was used by the U.S. armed forces, primarily Navy SEALs and Delta Force. It was most commonly built in 7.62×51mm NATO chambering with an internal 5-round magazine, or optionally configured to use either 5- or 10-round M14 detachable box magazines. It was also built with a magnum action, accommodating calibers such as .300 Winchester Magnum and .338 Lapua Magnum. The magnum action version was available only with an internal 5-round magazine. Harris also produced the M89, with essentially the same build standard as the M86, but which utilized a rifle stock with an enhanced grip mold.
