= Nightforce Optics =

Optical technology manufacturer

- Type: Subsidiary
- Industry: Arms industry
- Founded: 1992; 34 years ago
- Founder: Ray Dennis
- Headquarters: Orofino, Idaho, United States
- Area served: United States
- Products: Gun telescopic sights, spotting scopes and mounting accessories
- Parent: Lightforce Performance Lighting
- Website: www.nightforceoptics.com

Nightforce Optics is an American manufacturer of high-end telescopic sights, spotting scopes and mounting accessories, based in Lavonia, Georgia with factory headquarters in Orofino, Idaho. Established in 1992, the company is the optics subsidiary of Lightforce Performance Lighting, an Australian manufacturer of specialty lighting products based in Hindmarsh, South Australia.

== History ==
The company's founder, Ray Dennis, is an Australian dentist whose parents were German immigrants settled in South Australia after the Second World War. At a very early age he participated in rabbit and fox hunting with his grandfather, and became a keen hunter as he grew older. Due to the nocturnal/crepuscular nature of many Australian wild animals, spotlighting is the most common hunting method. After finding the contemporary spotlight products inadequate for his need, Dennis developed his own spotlight design using injection molded plastic, 7-inch reflectors and a 100-watt halogen projector bulb, which is lightweight and capable of pushing beam illumination to over 400 yards (370 m). At the same time, he also found the popular European riflescopes on the market were missing the right features needed for low-light hunting applications such as parallax adjustment and high magnifications, and the American products often had small objective size and very fine reticles and hence lacking in light-gathering power and reticle clarity.

When going to the 1986 SHOT Show in New Orleans to try market his spotlights, Dennis found a manufacturer in Japan that can produce scopes designed to his suggested specifications, and ordered a batch of 500 units to be made and sold in the Australian market. The sale was a success, and Dennis decided to establish his own company named Lightforce to sell his products, with the intention to also venture into the North American market. The American branch was initially established in Seattle with only two staff members, and primarily focused on marketing spotlighting products as Dennis considered the American optics market was already well-established with little room for a small new competitor like his company. To his surprise, the American consumers responded rather coldly to the spotlights (as night hunting was rare in North America at the time, and spotlighting was outlawed in many US states), but very warmly to the scopes. The company then switched its focus to sell predominantly optics in America.

The company changed its name to Nightforce in the early 1990s after being confronted by a Californian lightbar manufacturer also named Lightforce, who demanded $25,000 for trademark sharing — an amount Dennis found unacceptable. After that manufacturer later went out of business, the company acquired the legal rights to use the "Lightforce" brand name to its lighting products, and retained the "Nightforce" brand for its sporting optics products as the trademark already established a sizable market following with its 3.5-15× power Varmint scopes.

In 1998, the company moved its operations from Washington to Idaho. Soon afterwards, the company rolled out the famous NXS series scopes, which was their first flagship product suitable for both military and hunting applications, aiming to appeal to top-tier organizations (such as the Navy SEALs) within the United States Armed Forces. Military contracts started to arrive in the early 2000s, and the company bidded in the Precision Sniper Rifle program in 2009 but lost out to Schmidt & Bender. However, in 2010, the company was awarded a $25.8 million firm-fixed-price contract to manufacture scopes for special forces and snipers in the United States Army, Navy, Air Force and Marine Corps, with accompanying service for spares, repairs and upgrades.

== Products ==
=== Riflescope ===
- ATACR™ ("Advanced Tactical Riflescope") family
- B.E.A.S.T. ("Best Example of Advanced Scope Technology") 5-25×56 F1
- SHV™ ("Shooter Hunter Varminter") family
- Competition™ series
- Precision Benchrest™ series
- NX8™ 1-8×24 F1
- NXS™ ("Nightforce Xtreme Scope") family

=== Spotting scope ===
- TS-80™ Hi-Def™ 20-60×
- TS-82™ Xtreme Hi-Def™ 20-70×

=== Accessories ===
- Scope mount
  - Standard Duty series aluminium mounts and bases
  - X-Treme Duty series steel/titanium rings, mounts and bases
- Carbon Fiber Tripod
- Nightforce Angle Degree Indicator (with various mounting options)
- Top Ring bubble level
- Power Throw Lever (PTL™)
- Nightforce Tool Kit
- Nightforce Cleaning Kit
