= Trademark share =

Trademark share is a company's share of registered and unregistered trade marks in a particular industry or market segment. It is a key metric and one of many useful tools, when appropriately used, to understand how well positioned a company is to gain some competitive advantage (e.g. more profit or revenue, better ROI on ad campaigns, defend or increase market share) within an industry or market segment.
