= Unertl Optical Company =

Manufacturer of telescopic sights

Unertl Optical Company, Inc.
- Company type: Private
- Industry: Optics and lenses
- Founded: 1928
- Defunct: 2008
- Headquarters: Mars, Pennsylvania, United States
- Key people: John Unertl Jr., Col. Rocky Greene
- Parent: 21st Century Technology, Inc.

Unertl Optical Company, Inc. was a manufacturer of telescopic sights in the United States from 1928 until 2008. They are known for their 10× fixed-power scopes that were used on the Marine Corps' M40 rifle and made famous by Marine Corps Scout Sniper Carlos Hathcock during the Vietnam War.

== History ==
John Unertl Sr. after emigrating from Germany and working for the J.W. Fecker Target Scope Company, founded the John Unertl Optical Company in 1928. J. Unertl Optical Co. produced high quality, external adjustment scopes for competitive shooters and varmint hunters. He also produced some of the finest spotting scopes of the day including a 100 mm Team scopes used by Military and well equipped civilian teams at Camp Perry for decades. During World War II, Unertl manufactured the USMC 8x sniper scope mounted on 1903 sniper rifles. In the 1980's, the company became legendary in the sniper community for its 10x USMC Sniper scope designed by John Unertl Jr and mounted on the USMC M40A1 and M40A3 in 7.62mm. A .50 caliber version was used on the USMC SASR. John Unertl Jr was adamant about selling "USMC" marked scope only to the Marine Corps.

A variant of the 10x Tactical scope, similar and visually identical to one used by the USMC but with turrets calibrated in metres rather than yards, was sold to the Canadian Department of National Defence (DND) for use on the 7.62x51mm NATO Parker Hale C3A1 Sniper Rifle. These scopes were marked as 'C3 Sniper' and had a 2 to 4 digit serial number.

The few scopes sold to a limited number of law enforcement agencies and even fewer civilians were marked "10x Sniper" and carried a "T" prefix on the serial numbers.

Servicing of these scope was taken over by U.S. Optics, which also produced their own version, using the names MST-100 for the 7.62 scope and MST-150 for the .50 BMG Scopes. In 2002 the company was purchased by 21st Century Technology, Inc., owned by Col. Rocky Greene, and the headquarters was moved to Las Vegas, Nevada. In the early 2000s the Marine Corps began phasing out Unertl Scopes in favor of other scopes such as the Schmidt & Bender 3–12×50 Police Marksman II LP. By 2006 the company had begun marketing firearms in addition to their line of scopes, including a civilian copy of the Marine Corps MEU(SOC) pistol and the M40A3 Sniper Rifle. By 2008 the company had closed.

There were actually three successive "John Unertls". Sr. started the company and ran it until his death. Jr. took over after that. And while the company was well known for its rifle scopes, its major revenue came from high end optical systems made for various branches of government including very sophisticated optical/mechanical instrumentation, optics for military jet gunsights, fire control optics, and wind tunnel instrumentation (Schlieren photography systems for the Naval Surface Weapon Center in White Oak, MD). The last John Unertl, John Robert Unertl, after leaving the company worked his way up to Division President of the optical instrument division of Leitz.

== Products ==
- Fixed-power, external mount adjusted Target Scopes
- Hunting Scopes "Falcon", "Hawk" & "Condor", 2 3/4×, 4× & 6× respectively
- 10×43 Vulture
- Ultra-10 43 vulture
- Spotting Scopes
- 100mm Team Scope
- 10x Sniper for 7.62×51mm (Used by the Marine Corps, FBI & Canada)
- 10x Sniper for .50 caliber (Used by the Marine Corps)
- Very sophisticated optical/mechanical instrumentation for government
