= .300 Winchester Magnum =

Rifle cartridge

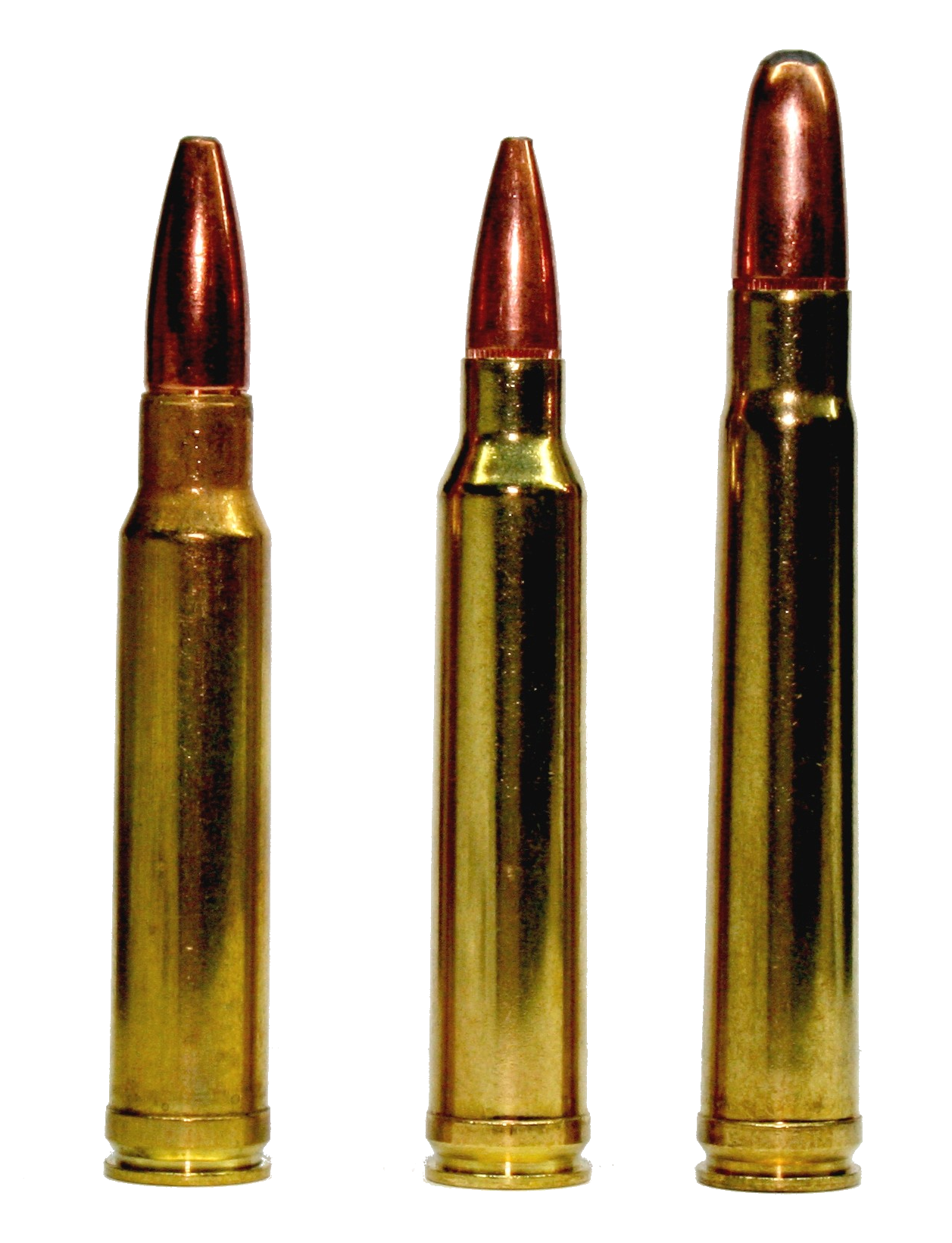
- .300 Winchester Magnum (center) flanked by its parent cartridges: the .338 Winchester Magnum (left) and the .375 H&H Magnum (right).
- Type: Rifle, Large game
- Place of origin: United States

Production history
- Designer: Winchester Repeating Arms Company
- Designed: 1963

Specifications
- Parent case: .375 H&H Magnum
- Case type: Belted, bottleneck
- Bullet diameter: .308 in (7.8 mm)
- Land diameter: .300 in (7.6 mm)
- Neck diameter: .339 in (8.6 mm)
- Shoulder diameter: .489 in (12.4 mm)
- Base diameter: .513 in (13.0 mm)
- Rim diameter: .532 in (13.5 mm)
- Rim thickness: .050 in (1.3 mm)
- Case length: 2.62 in (67 mm)
- Overall length: 3.34 in (85 mm)
- Case capacity: 94 gr H_{2}O (6.1 cm^{3})
- Rifling twist: 1 in 10 in (250 mm)
- Primer type: Large Rifle Magnum
- Maximum pressure (C.I.P.): 62,366 psi (430.00 MPa)
- Maximum pressure (SAAMI): 64,000 psi (440 MPa)
- Maximum CUP: 54,000 CUP

Ballistic performance
Bullet mass/type	Velocity	Energy
150 gr (9.7 g) GMX	3,300 ft/s (1,000 m/s)	3,628 ft⋅lbf (4,919 J)
180 gr (11.7 g) BT	3,193 ft/s (973 m/s)	4,076 ft⋅lbf (5,526 J)
190 gr (12.3 g) BTSP	3,117 ft/s (950 m/s)	4,100 ft⋅lbf (5,600 J)
200 gr (13.0 g) Partition	3,029 ft/s (923 m/s)	4,092 ft⋅lbf (5,548 J)
220 gr (14.3 g) Sierra MatchKing (HPBT)	2,875 ft/s (876 m/s)	4,038 ft⋅lbf (5,475 J)
- Test barrel length: 24 inches (61 cm); Source: Accurate Powders load guide v3.5 Hodgdon powders achieve approx 100fps less.

The .300 Winchester Magnum (also known as .300 Win Mag or .300 WM) (7.62×67mmB, 7.62×66BR) is a belted, bottlenecked magnum rifle cartridge that was introduced by the Winchester Repeating Arms Company in 1963. The .300 Winchester Magnum is a magnum cartridge designed to fit in a standard rifle action. It is based on the .375 H&H Magnum, which has been blown out, shortened, and necked down to accept a .30 caliber (7.62 mm) bullet.

The .300 Win Mag is extremely versatile and has been adopted by a wide range of users, including big game hunters, target shooters, military units, and law enforcement departments.

Many hunters have found the cartridge to be an effective all-around choice, with bullet options ranging from the flatter-shooting 150-grain to the harder-hitting 200+ grain selections available in factory ammunition. The .300 Win Mag remains the most popular .30-caliber magnum among American hunters, despite faster and more powerful .300 Magnums options such as the .300 Weatherby Magnum and .30-378 Weatherby Magnum, as well as the newer .300 Remington Ultra Magnum, .300 Norma Magnum, .30 Nosler, and .300 PRC. Though, all of these must be chambered in a long magnum action, while the .300 Win Mag uses a standard length action, resulting in a lighter rifle.

It was designed as a hunting cartridge and is mainly used for hunting a wide range of mid-to-large-sized big game such as North American moose, elk, bighorn sheep, mule deer and white-tailed deer.

The .300 Win Mag is capable of delivering better long-range performance with heavier, large ballistic coefficient projectiles than any other standard and short-length .30 caliber cartridge. Military and law enforcement departments have also adopted the cartridge as a long-range sniper round, intended to be used for shots at longer ranges than the .308 Winchester. As a testament to its accuracy, following its introduction, it went on to win several 1,000-yard (910 m) competitions.

== Cartridge history ==
Before the advent of the .300 Winchester Magnum, there were already many .30-caliber (7.62 mm) cartridges billed as offering a "magnum" level of performance. Such rounds included the .30 Newton of 1913 and the .300 H&H Magnum of 1925. The .30 Newton saw limited commercial success, however, and the .300 H&H was too long for the standard length Mauser and Springfield rifle actions of the time, barring substantial modifications.

Beginning with the .270 Weatherby Magnum in 1943, Roy Weatherby introduced a popular line of rifle cartridges based on the H&H case shortened to fit a standard length (2.5 in [63.50 mm]) action. The Weatherby cartridges of any given caliber followed an "improved" design that entailed "blowing out" the H&H Magnum parent case, thereby reducing case taper and increasing usable powder capacity. The .300 Weatherby Magnum, an "improved", full-length cartridge derived from the .300 H&H, was introduced in 1944.

The larger manufacturers soon noticed Weatherby's standard-length magnum case and, in due time, followed suit. From 1956 to 1959, Winchester introduced three such cartridges: the .264 Winchester Magnum, .338 Winchester Magnum and .458 Winchester Magnum, all based on the shortened and blown out .375 H&H Magnum case. The omission of the popular .30 caliber from that lineup prompted a response from the shooting community and Winchester's competitors. Wildcatters soon produced the .30-338 Winchester Magnum, and Norma Projektilfabrik, who were by now manufacturing ammunition for Weatherby, took the standard-length basic Weatherby brass and necked it down to .30 caliber (7.62 mm) to form the .308 Norma Magnum.

The .300 Winchester Magnum was introduced in 1963 by Winchester for use in the Model 70 rifle. Winchester developed the .300 Win Mag by taking the .338 Winchester Magnum, which was introduced in 1958, moving the shoulder forward by 4.0 millimetres (0.156 in) and lengthening it by 3.0 millimetres (0.120 in). This resulted in a cartridge with a neck slightly shorter than the bullet's diameter. Some gun writers have speculated that, had the cartridge been released earlier, its dimensions would have more closely matched the .30-338 Winchester Magnum wildcat cartridge.

The .300 Winchester Magnum was not an instant success, mainly due to competition from the comparable 7mm Remington Magnum cartridge introduced in 1962. However, interest among hunters and shooters grew with time, and it gradually became the most popular of the magnum cartridges.

The .300 Winchester Magnum's broad availability in popular rifles such as the Winchester Model 70, Ruger M77, Remington Model 700 and Weatherby Mark V, together with the wide availability of ammunition from many manufacturers, made the cartridge a popular choice among hunters and competitive shooters the world over. Although the .300 H&H Magnum, .300 Weatherby Magnum, .30-338 Winchester Magnum, and the .308 Norma Magnum had a head start on the .300 Win Mag, most of these cartridges eventually faded into obscurity. Only the .300 Win Mag and the .300 Weatherby Mag survived into the 21st century as readily available cartridges, with the Winchester round by far the more popular of the two. New .30 caliber magnums have since been introduced, including the .300 Winchester Short Magnum, .300 Remington Ultra Magnum, .30 Nosler, and 300 PRC; however, none of these have achieved the popularity that the .300 Win Mag retains.

== Design and specifications ==
The .300 Winchester Magnum uses the same case head design as the .375 H&H Magnum, its parent cartridge, though the taper of the round has been significantly reduced to ensure greater case volume. The larger dimensions of the .300 Win Mag compared to the .308 Norma Magnum and .30-338 Winchester Magnum cartridges ensure that rifles chambered in such rounds can readily be rechambered to the .300 Win Mag. However, the longer rounds' shorter necks necessitate that comparable bullets be seated more deeply in the case.

== Cartridge dimensions ==
The ammunition standards organizations SAAMI (Sporting Arms and Ammunition Manufacturers' Institute) and C.I.P. (Commission Internationale Permanente pour l'Epreuve des Armes à Feu Portatives) have provided specifications for the .300 Winchester Magnum cartridge. Almost no divergence between C.I.P. and SAAMI dimensional values exists for this cartridge.
However, case volume varies across manufacturers to such an extent that the reloading software suite QuickLOAD provides five distinct cartridge case capacities. The SAAMI specification .300 Winchester Magnum case capacity is 91.5 grains of H_{2}O (5.93 ml).
According to QuickLoad, the case capacities of .300 Win Mag brass produced by four ammunition manufacturers measure as follows:
Remington 88.0 grains of H_{2}O (5.70 ml)
Federal 92.0 grains of H_{2}O (5.96 ml)
Winchester 93.8 grains of H_{2}O (6.08 ml)
Norma 95.5 grains of H_{2}O (6.19 ml)

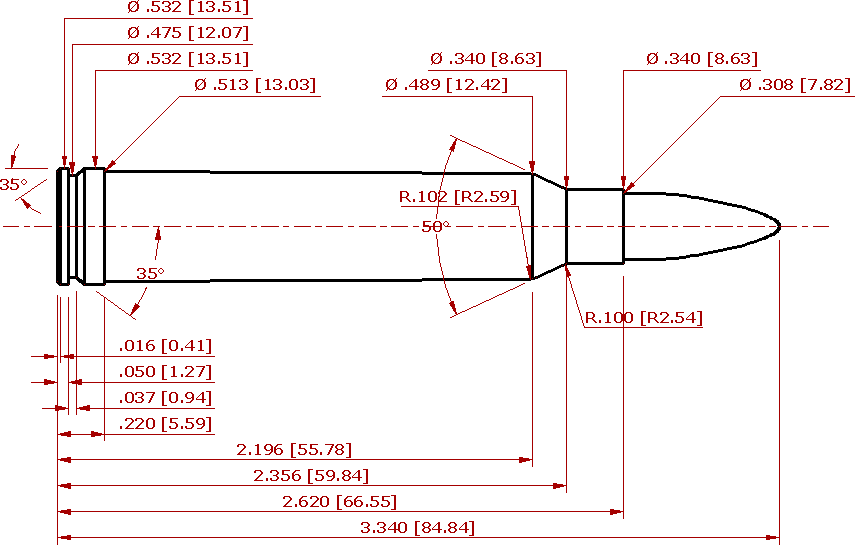

.300 Winchester Magnum SAAMI cartridge dimensions. All sizes in inches (in) and millimeters (mm). The projectile diameter should be 0.309 in (7.85mm)

SAAMI recommends a bore diameter of 7.6 millimetres (0.300 in) and a groove diameter of 7.8 millimetres (0.308 in). SAAMI recommended a six-groove barrel with each groove being 2.8 millimetres (0.110 in) wide. Recommended twist ratio is 1:10 (254 mm).
C.I.P. defines the common rifling twist rate for this cartridge as 254 mm (1 in 10 in), 6 grooves, Ø lands = 7.62 mm (0.300 in), Ø grooves = 7.82 mm (0.308 in), land width = 2.79 mm (0.110 in), and the primer type is large rifle magnum.

The SAAMI Maximum Average Pressure (MAP) for this cartridge is 441.3 MPa (64,000 psi) piezo pressure (54,000 CUP).
According to the official C.I.P. (Commission Internationale Permanente pour l'Epreuve des Armes à Feu Portatives) rulings, the .300 Winchester Magnum can handle up to 430.00 MPa (62,366 psi) P_{max} piezo pressure. In C.I.P. regulated countries, every rifle cartridge combo has to be proofed at 125% of this maximum C.I.P. pressure to certify for sale to consumers. This means that .300 Winchester Magnum-chambered arms in C.I.P.-regulated countries are currently (2013) proof-tested at 537.50 MPa (77,958 psi) PE piezoelectric pressure.

== Performance ==
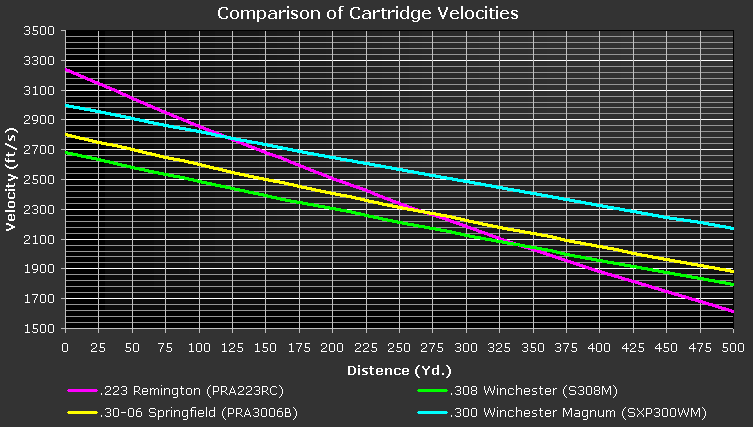

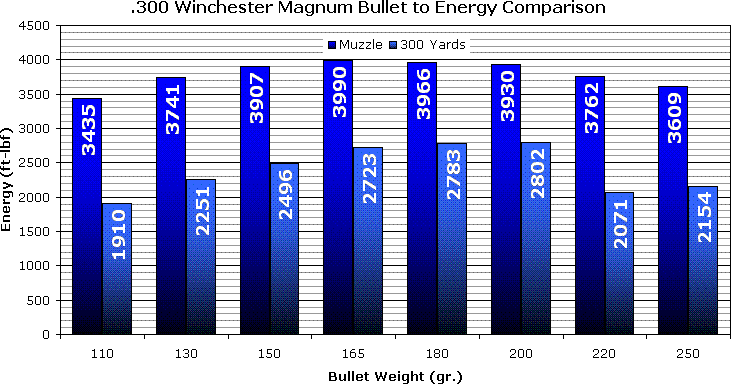

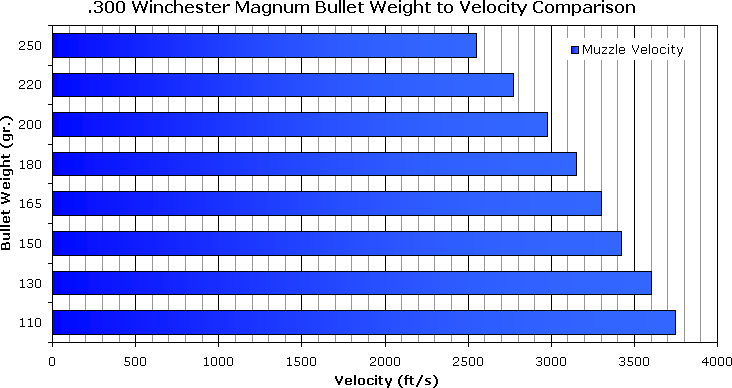

The .300 Winchester Magnum can stabilize bullet weights ranging from 110 to 220 grains and is used for applications such as big-game hunting, benchrest shooting, and military purposes.

The most useful bullet weights for the .300 Winchester Magnum are those weighing between 150–200 grains (9.7–13.0 g). However, bullets weighing between 7.1–16.2 g (110–250 gr) are available to the reloader for the .300 Winchester Magnum.

=== 150-grain bullets ===
Although the 150 grain bullet may have a lower ballistic coefficient than heavier alternatives, this is compensated by its high velocities, which extend its maximum point blank range, making it suitable for light-skinned big game such as deer and sheep, up to considerable distances. Winchester's factory ammunition for the .300 Winchester Magnum is capable of 990 m/s (3,260 ft/s) with the 150-grain (9.7 g) bullet and 910 m/s (3,000 ft/s) with the 12-gram (180 gr) bullet, however old Western "Power Point" soft point can reach past 1,000 metres per second (3,400 ft/s) with 9.7 g (150 gr) projectiles. The maximum point blank range for the 9.7 g (150 gr) bullet is 291 metres (318 yd) yards when zeroed at 250 metres (270 yd). The maximum point blank range for the 12 g (180 gr) bullet is 300 yards when zeroed at 232 metres (254 yd). The ability to zero the .300 Winchester Magnum and shoot without holdover to 270 metres (300 yd) makes the cartridge one of the flatter-shooting cartridges.

=== 165-grain bullets ===
The 165-grain bullet has a higher ballistic coefficient than a similarly shaped 150-grain bullet while maintaining very high velocity, resulting in a flatter trajectory. Usually, a 165-grain bullet shot from a .300 Win Mag has a muzzle velocity of approximately 3160 fps, which is 100 to 150 fps slower than the lighter 150-grain bullet. Similar 168-grain bullets are also popular among the .300 Win Mag and other .30-caliber magnum cartridges.

=== 180-grain bullets ===
Probably the most popular weight for the 300 Win Mag is the 180-grain bullet, with a high ballistic coefficient and capable of taking down light-skinned big game of any weight. The 180- and 185-grain bullets are also considered the most versatile, with a muzzle velocity of 2950 fps from average factory loads.

=== 190 to 220-grain bullets ===
Due to their high ballistic coefficients, heavier bullets are usually preferred by long-range shooters, as they are extremely efficient at bucking wind and carrying downrange energy capable of taking down game of any size in America and Europe. These bullets are generally loaded to reach muzzle velocities of 2700 to 2800 fps.

=== Comparison with other .30 caliber big game cartridges ===
Cartridge	Criteria	Muzzle	100-yard (91 m)	200-yard (180 m)	300-yard (270 m)	400-yard (370 m)	500-yard (460 m)
.308 Winchester (Winchester – SXP308) 150 gr (9.7 g)	Velocity	2,825 ft/s (861 m/s)	2,616 ft/s (797 m/s)	2,417 ft/s (737 m/s)	2,226 ft/s (678 m/s)	2,044 ft/s (623 m/s)	1,871 ft/s (570 m/s)
.308 Winchester (Winchester – SXP308) 150 gr (9.7 g)	Energy	2,658 ft⋅lbf (3,604 J)	2,279 ft⋅lbf (3,090 J)	1,945 ft⋅lbf (2,637 J)	1,650 ft⋅lbf (2,240 J)	1,392 ft⋅lbf (1,887 J)	1,166 ft⋅lbf (1,581 J)
.30-06 Springfield (Remington – PRA3006B) 165 gr (10.7 g)	Velocity	2,800 ft/s (850 m/s)	2,597 ft/s (792 m/s)	2,403 ft/s (732 m/s)	2,217 ft/s (676 m/s)	2,039 ft/s (621 m/s)	1,870 ft/s (570 m/s)
.30-06 Springfield (Remington – PRA3006B) 165 gr (10.7 g)	Energy	2,872 ft⋅lbf (3,894 J)	2,470 ft⋅lbf (3,350 J)	2,115 ft⋅lbf (2,868 J)	1,800 ft⋅lbf (2,400 J)	1,523 ft⋅lbf (2,065 J)	1,281 ft⋅lbf (1,737 J)
.300 Winchester Magnum (Winchester – SXP300WM) 180 gr (12 g)	Velocity	3,160 ft/s (960 m/s)	2,983 ft/s (909 m/s)	2,813 ft/s (857 m/s)	2,649 ft/s (807 m/s)	2,492 ft/s (760 m/s)	2,339 ft/s (713 m/s)
.300 Winchester Magnum (Winchester – SXP300WM) 180 gr (12 g)	Energy	3,992 ft⋅lbf (5,412 J)	3,556 ft⋅lbf (4,821 J)	3,163 ft⋅lbf (4,288 J)	2,806 ft⋅lbf (3,804 J)	2,482 ft⋅lbf (3,365 J)	2,187 ft⋅lbf (2,965 J)
.300 Weatherby Magnum (Weatherby – N300180ACB) 180 gr (12 g)	Velocity	3,250 ft/s (990 m/s)	3,051 ft/s (930 m/s)	2,861 ft/s (872 m/s)	2,678 ft/s (816 m/s)	2,503 ft/s (763 m/s)	2,335 ft/s (712 m/s)
.300 Weatherby Magnum (Weatherby – N300180ACB) 180 gr (12 g)	Energy	4,223 ft⋅lbf (5,726 J)	3,721 ft⋅lbf (5,045 J)	3,271 ft⋅lbf (4,435 J)	2,868 ft⋅lbf (3,888 J)	2,505 ft⋅lbf (3,396 J)	2,179 ft⋅lbf (2,954 J)
Values courtesy of respective manufacturers

Compared with the 30-06 Springfield the .300 Winchester Magnum provides a roughly 400 ft/s (120 m/s) increase in velocity. This translates to about 20% greater energy advantage over the 30-06 Springfield cartridge. Due to the short neck, heavier bullets, particularly those weighing greater than 13 grams (200 gr) and mono-metal bullets such as the Barnes X bullets, will need to be seated more deeply into the cartridge. As the bullet takes up volume that the propellant could have occupied, the velocity advantage diminishes as the bullet's weight increases.

The .300 Winchester Magnum is known for its accuracy and has been used in 910-metre (1,000 yd)- and 1,000-metre (1,100 yd)-yard competitions. While in hunting situations, such accuracy is unnecessary, it does aid in extending the cartridge's range. Taken together with its performance, it remains one of the most useful and popular cartridges today.

Although cartridges such as the .30-378 Weatherby Magnum, .300 Remington Ultra Magnum, and the .300 Weatherby Magnum all exceed the performance of the .300 Winchester Magnum. None of these cartridges can be chambered in a standard-length action. Few .30-caliber (7.62 mm) standard-length cartridges match the performance and versatility of the .300 Winchester Magnum.

The downside to this performance is recoil. The amount of recoil the cartridge generates is a step up from that of the non-magnum .30-caliber (7.62 mm) cartridges. Its recoil is about 30% greater than that of the .30-06 Springfield, which is known as a 'stout' cartridge. With the average load for the .300 Winchester Magnum, the recoil energy is roughly 30 ft-lbs. This would put the .300 Winchester Magnum at the upper limit of what most shooters can shoot comfortably for extended shooting sessions. As a rough comparison, the recoil of the .300 Winchester Magnum is roughly comparable to a 12-gauge shotgun shooting 1 oz. slugs. This greater recoil can make the .300 Winchester Magnum, despite its inherent accuracy advantages, a harder cartridge to shoot accurately than non-magnum .30-caliber cartridges such as the .30-06 Springfield or the .308 Winchester. On the other hand, recoil is subjective (some are more sensitive to it than others), and one can get used to it with practice. Also, many rifles available today have effective recoil-attenuating features built into them, such as muzzle compensators and energy-absorbing stocks and butt-pads, that can significantly lessen the recoil the shooter feels.

Recoil from the .300 Win Mag is noticeably higher than the well-known and popular .30-06 Springfield. Subsequently, Remington has made low-recoil rounds called "Managed-Recoil" available for the .300 Win Mag, which have lower recoil while providing performance similar to the .30-06 Springfield.

== Hunting applications ==
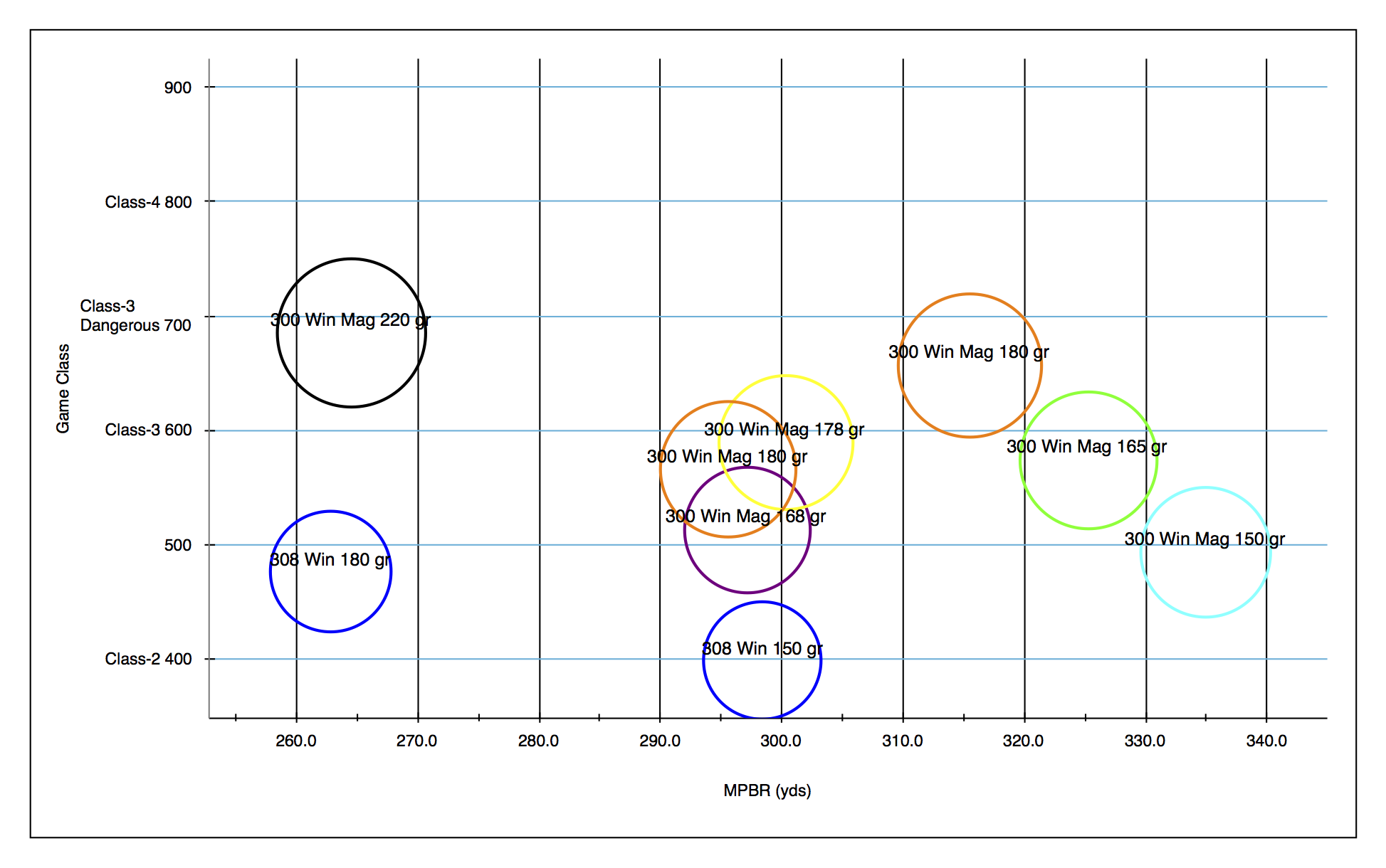
Game Class vs 6-inch Maximum Point Blank Range comparing various 300 Winchester Magnum cartridges

The .300 Winchester Magnum is well-suited for a wide range of game. Due to its flat trajectory and high kinetic energy, the cartridge is a favored round for big-game hunting worldwide, as well as for long-range shots and mountain hunting. The cartridge is commercially loaded with bullets ranging from 150 to 220 grains.

It is often used when hunting the members of the ungulate family such as Dall sheep, white tail deer, mule deer, elk, and moose; being popular cartridge among hunters for these and other big game species around the world. Elk can weigh as much as 450 kilograms (1,000 lb) and moose 640 kilograms (1,400 lb). Controlled expansion bullet weights of 10.7–13.0 grams (165–200 gr) are the preferred choices for these game species. While lighter cup and core bullets weighing 9.7–10.7 g (150–165 gr) are adequate for smaller deer such as the mule deer and white-tailed deer.

150-grain bullets are generally used for hunting medium-sized game species. Factory loads are usually loaded to leave the muzzle at 3,250 feet per second, offering the hunter a flat trajectory for long-range shots. Nevertheless, handloaders may increase muzzle velocities. 165 and 168-grain bullets also offer a flat trajectory with higher ballistic coefficients, which retain accuracy and kinetic energy over distance. The most popular bullet weight is the 180-grain, which is commercially loaded to a muzzle velocity of 3,000 fps. This load offers a balance between flat trajectory, ballistic coefficient, and energy, allowing large-size big game animals such as elk and moose to be killed at considerable distances. Loaded with heavier 200-grain bullets, the .300 Win Mag is effective in hunting thick-boned heavier game.

With its high velocity, low bullet drop, and high energy retention, the .300 Winchester Magnum is useful for hunting sheep and other mountain game species, even at extended range. This may be considered unethical for many sport hunters.

The .300 Winchester Magnum cartridge is effective on dangerous game such as bear. Both black bears and grizzly bears are hunted using the cartridge. The .300 Winchester Magnum is a lighter cartridge than typically required for the largest bears; when loaded with heavier bullets, hunters have had success with it against these large bears.

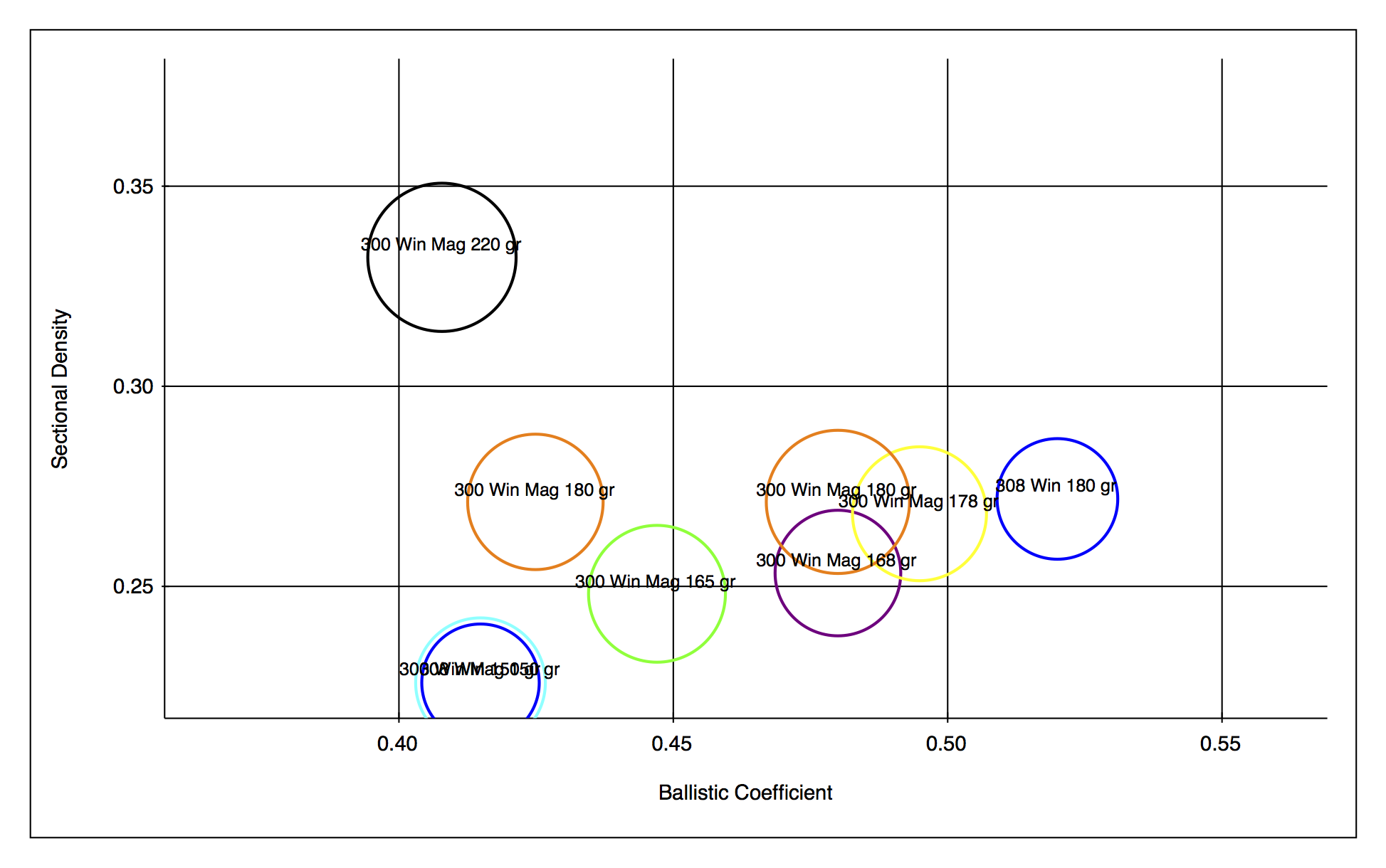
Sectional Density vs Ballistic Coefficient comparing various 300 Winchester Magnum cartridges

== Military and law enforcement applications ==
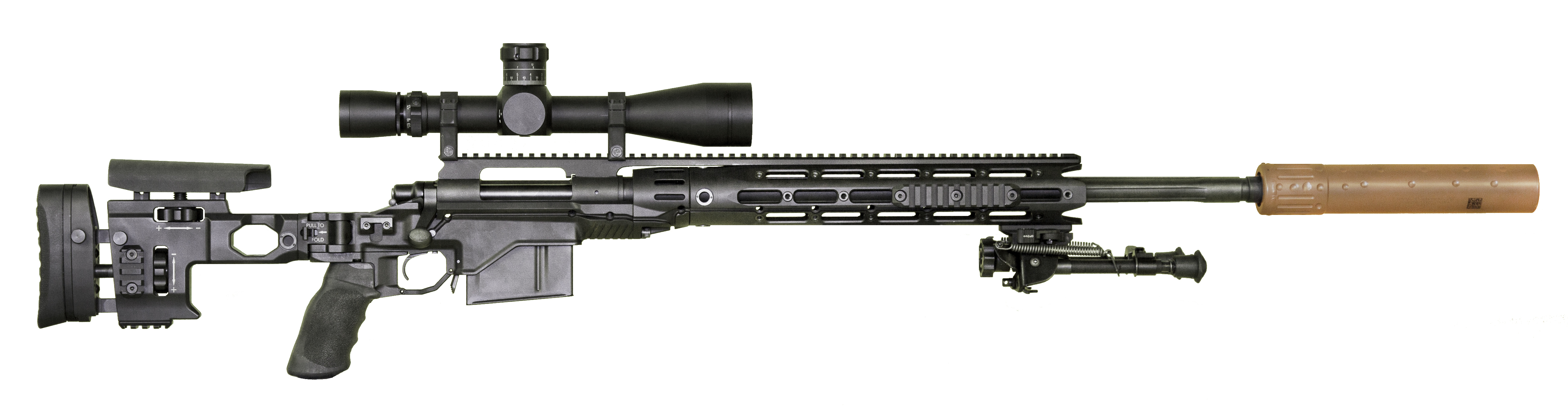
M2010 Enhanced Sniper Rifle reconfigured M24 Sniper Weapon System chambered in .300 Winchester Magnum.

The .300 Win Mag sees use in long-range benchrest shooting competitions and has been adopted by law enforcement sharpshooters and by a few specific branches of the U.S. Military for use by snipers. The maximum effective range is generally accepted as 1,210 yards (1,110 m) with ammunition incorporating low-drag projectiles. Sub 1 minute-of-angle (MOA) accuracy out to 1,000 yards (910 m) is not unusual in precision-built rifles firing match-grade ammunition.

The U.S. government purchased MK 248 MOD 1 .300 Winchester Magnum match-grade ammunition in 2009 for use in adapted M24 Sniper Weapon Systems and other .300 Winchester Magnum sniper rifles like the U.S. Navy MK 13. This ammunition was developed as a .300 Winchester Magnum Match Product Improvement (PIP) and uses the 220 gr (14.26 g) Sierra MatchKing Hollow Point Boat Tail (HPBT) very-low-drag bullet fired at a nominal muzzle velocity of 2,850 ft/s plus or minus 50 ft/s (869 m/s ± 15.2 m/s). According to the U.S. Navy this ammunition should increase the maximum effective range of .300 Winchester Magnum sniper rifle systems to 1,500 yards (1,370 m), decrease wind deflection on bullets in flight and use Hodgdon H1000, a reduced muzzle flash propellant that remains temperature stable across an operational temperature range of −25 °F to +165 °F (−32 °C to 74 °C). The 3.55 in (90.2 mm) long MK 248 MOD 1 or alike ammunition is not offered commercially, since it exceeds SAAMI standards for overall length and maximum chamber pressure. However, the handloader can take advantage of modern advances in powder technology and actually exceed the velocity of the MK 248 MOD 1 cartridge while still loading to maximum SAAMI cartridge overall length, and maintaining safe pressure.

According to JBM Ballistics, using the 0.310 G7 ballistic coefficient provided by Bryan Litz, and a Weapon Employment Zone (WEZ) analysis of the XM2010 rifle with various .300 Winchester Magnum ammunition types by Bryan Litz, the MK 248 MOD 1 .300 Winchester Magnum cartridge, when fired at its nominal muzzle velocity of 869 m/s (2,850 ft/s), should have 1,286 to 1,289 m (1,406 to 1,410 yd) supersonic range under International Standard Atmosphere conditions at sea level (air density ρ = 1.225 kg/m^{3}).

In January 2014, the U.S. Department of Defense annual testing report found that the older A191 or MK 248 Mod 0 .300 Winchester Magnum service round loaded with aerodynamically less efficient 190 gr (12.32 g) Sierra MatchKing Hollow Point Boat Tail (HPBT) bullets (0.270 G7 ballistic coefficient provided by Bryan Litz) fired from the XM2010 demonstrated adequate performance and lethality. Live fire tests were conducted in March 2013 against ballistics gelatin, light material barriers, and other targets to determine the projectile's ability to perforate targets. This was the first time the Pentagon's Director, Operational Test and Evaluation (DOT&E), tested the round, which can hit targets out to 1,200 m (1,312 yd).

Several companies, among them HS Precision, Kimber, and Remington, manufacture rifles chambered for the .300 Winchester Magnum specifically targeted at law enforcement agencies. The Chattanooga Police Department and Minot Police Department S.W.A.T units and the L.A. County Sheriffs Department's Special Enforcement Bureau which have adopted the .300 Winchester Magnum in some capacity. Due to the power and performance of the .300 Winchester Magnum cartridge, the cartridge is more likely to be employed by specialist units within a police department rather than as a general service weapon issued to law enforcement agents.

=== Military and law enforcement firearms ===
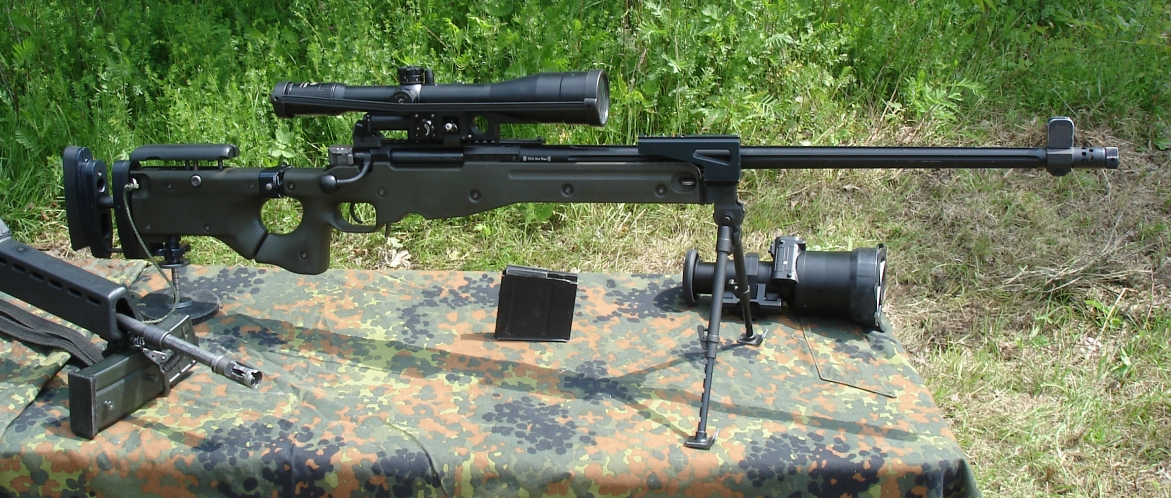
Standard issue Bundeswehr G22

- Finland: Sako TRG-42
- Germany: Bundeswehr G22
- United Kingdom: Accuracy International AWM (Such as Mk 13 rifle)
- US: Mk 13 rifle
- US: M2010 Enhanced Sniper Rifle
- US: M86 sniper rifle
- US: Armalite Model AR-30
- US: Remington Model 700 Police Long Action tactical rifle
- US: Savage Model 110BA
- US: Weatherby TRR Threat Response Rifle

== Criticism ==
The .300 Winchester Magnum was designed with a neck that is shorter than the diameter of its bullet. If Winchester had released the cartridge before 1960, the cartridge would have been similar to the .30-338 Winchester wildcat cartridge. However, by the time Winchester got around to designing their own .300, the .308 Norma Magnum and the .30-338 were already on the scene. To help differentiate it from the other .300 magnums, and to allow for the chambers of the standard length .300 magnums to be rebored to the .300 Winchester Magnum chamber dimensions, Winchester moved the shoulder forward and lengthened the cartridge slightly. This created the much-criticized short neck of the .300 Winchester Magnum.

The short neck was thought to hinder accuracy because it would prevent the cartridge from aligning with the bore, but this is rarely an issue, either today or when the cartridge was designed. The fact that the cartridge has gone to win many 1,000-yard (910 m) matches suggests that such a concern is unfounded.

== See also ==
- 7 mm caliber
- .30-06 Springfield
- .300 Norma Magnum — similar non-belted cartridge
- .300 Winchester Short Magnum
- List of crew-served weapons of the U.S. Armed Forces
- List of rifle cartridges
- Table of handgun and rifle cartridges
- Sectional density
