= UKM (disambiguation) =

UKM is an abbreviation for Universiti Kebangsaan Malaysia ("National University of Malaysia").

UKM may also refer to:

- 7.62mm UKM, a .300-caliber "wildcat" cartridge based on the .338 Lapua Magnum cartridge.
- UKM-2000, a Polish General Purpose Machinegun (Polish: Uniwersalny Karabin Maszynowy, "Universal Machinegun") that replaced the previous PK GPMG series.
  - UKM-2013, modernized version of the UKM-2000.
  - UKM-2000M, modernized version of the UKM-2013.
- UKM F.C., the Universiti Kebangsaan Malaysia Football Club.
- UKM Medical Molecular Biology Institute (UMBI), a Molecular Biology research facility owned by the Universiti Kebangsaan Malaysia (UKM).
- United Kingdom, UNDP country code
- Usaha Kecil dan Menengah, Indonesian term for a small and medium-sized enterprise
