= Bolt thrust =

Internal ballisitics term

Bolt thrust or breech pressure is a term used in internal ballistics and firearms (whether small arms or artillery) that describes the amount of rearward force exerted by the propellant gases on the bolt or breech of a firearm action or breech when a projectile is fired. The applied force has both magnitude and direction, making it a vector quantity.

Bolt thrust is an important factor in weapons design. The greater the bolt thrust, the stronger the locking mechanism has to be to withstand it. Assuming equal engineering solutions and material, adding strength to a locking mechanism causes an increase in weight and size of locking mechanism components. For example, firearms using a simple blowback operation require bolts to be typically 1–2 lb (0.45–0.91 kg) of weight.

Higher power cartridges require heavier bolts (typically 20 lb (9.1 kg)) to keep the breech from opening prematurely; at some point, the bolt becomes too heavy to be practical. For an extreme example, a 20mm cannon using simple blowback and lubricated cartridges would need a 500-pound (230 kg) bolt to keep the cartridge safely in the barrel during the first few milliseconds.

Bolt thrust is not a measure to determine the amount of recoil or free recoil.

== Calculating bolt thrust ==
With a basic calculation the bolt thrust produced by a particular firearms cartridge can be calculated fairly accurately.

=== Formula ===
$\vec{F}_{bolt} = P_{max} \cdot A_{internal}.$

where:

- F_{bolt} = the amount of bolt thrust
- P_{max} = the maximum (peak) chamber pressure of the firearms cartridge
- A_{internal} = the inside area (of the cartridge case head) that the propellant deflagration gas pressure acts against

Cartridge case heads and chambers are generally circular. The area enclosed by a circle is:

$$Area = \pi r^2 \approx 3{.}1416 \cdot r^2.$$

where:

- π ≈ 3.1416
- r = the radius of the circle

Equivalently, denoting the diameter of the circle by d.

$$Area = \frac{\pi d^2}{4} \approx 0{.}7854 \cdot d^2.$$

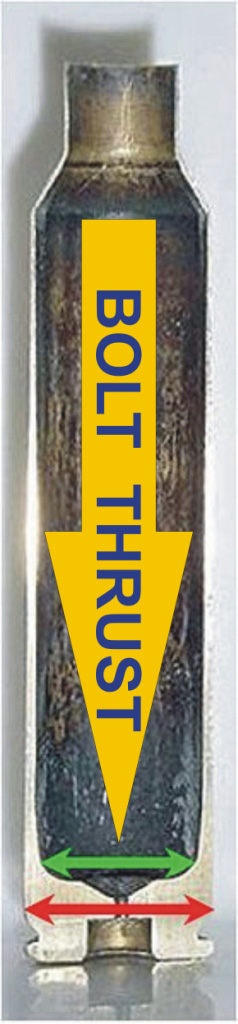
The green line denotes the internal case head diameter and the red line the external case head base diameter of a rifle cartridge case.

A practical problem regarding this method is that the internal case head diameter of a particular production lot of cartridge cases (different brands and lots normally differ dimensionally) can not be easily measured without damaging them.

=== Friction effects ===
A complicating matter regarding bolt thrust is that a cartridge case expands and deforms under high pressure and starts to "stick" to the chamber. This "friction-effect" can be accounted for with finite elements calculations on a computer, but it is a lot of specialized work and generally not worth the trouble.

By oiling proof rounds during NATO EPVAT testing procedures, NATO test centers intentionally lower case friction to promote high bolt thrust levels.

== Practical method to estimate bolt thrust ==
Instead of using the internal case head diameter, the external case head base diameter can also be measured with a caliper or micrometer or taken from the appropriate C.I.P. or SAAMI cartridge or chamber data tables and used for bolt thrust estimation calculations.

The basic calculation method is almost the same, but now the larger outside area of the cartridge case head is used instead of the smaller inside area.

$$\vec{F_{bolt}} = P_{max} \cdot A_{external}.$$

where:

- F_{bolt} = the amount of bolt thrust
- P_{max} = the maximum (peak) chamber pressure of the firearms cartridge
- A_{external} = the outside area of the cartridge case head

This method is fine for getting a good estimate regarding bolt thrust and assumes an overly large area that the gas pressure acts against yielding pessimistic estimations, generating a safety margin in the process for worse case scenarios which can result in increased maximum (peak) chamber pressure of the firearms cartridge, like a round that is chambered in an already very warm chamber that can result in cooking off (i.e. a thermally induced unintended firing).

=== Bolt thrust estimations for various pistol/revolver cartridges ===
Chambering	P1 diameter (mm)	A_{external} (cm^{2})	P_{max} (bar)	F_{bolt} (kgf)	F_{bolt}
.22 Long Rifle	5.74	0.2587	1,650	427	4,268 N (959 lb_{f})
FN 5.7×28 mm	7.95	0.4964	3,450	1,713	16,794 N (3,775 lb_{f})
9×19 mm Parabellum	9.93	0.7744	2,350	1,820	17,847 N (4,012 lb_{f})
HK 4.6×30 mm	8.02	0.5051	4,000	2,021	19,816 N (4,455 lb_{f})
.357 Magnum	9.63	0.7284	3,000	2,185	21,428 N (4,817 lb_{f})
.357 SIG	10.77	0.9110	3,050	2,779	27,248 N (6,126 lb_{f})
.380 ACP	9.70	0.7390	1,500	1,130	11,085 N (2,492 lb_{f})
.40 S&W	10.77	0.9110	2,250	2,050	20,101 N (4,519 lb_{f})
10 mm Auto	10.81	0.9178	2,300	2,111	20,701 N (4,654 lb_{f})
.41 Remington Magnum	11.05	0.9590	3,000	2,877	28,213 N (6,343 lb_{f})
.44 Remington Magnum	11.61	1.0587	2,800	2,964	29,069 N (6,535 lb_{f})
.45 ACP	12.09	1.1671	1,300	1,517	14,879 N (3,345 lb_{f})
.454 Casull	12.13	1.1556	3,900	4,507	44,197 N (9,936 lb_{f})
.500 S&W Magnum	13.46	1.4229	4,270	6,076	59,584 N (13,395 lb_{f})

The P1 (cartridge case base) diameters and P_{max} used in the calculations were taken from the appropriate C.I.P. data sheets.

=== Bolt thrust estimations for various rifle cartridges ===
Chambering	P1 diameter (mm)	A_{external} (cm^{2})	P_{max} (bar)	F_{bolt} (kgf)	F_{bolt}
5.45×39mm	10.00	0.7854	3,800	2,985	29,268 N (6,580 lb_{f})
.223 Remington	9.58	0.7208	4,300	3,099	30,396 N (6,833 lb_{f})
7.62×39mm	11.35	1.0118	3,550	3,592	35,223 N (7,918 lb_{f})
6mm ARC	11.20	0.9852	3,800	3,744	36,714 N (8,254 lb_{f})
.303 British	11.68	1.0715	3,650	3,911	38,352 N (8,622 lb_{f})
7.92×57mm Mauser	11.97	1.1197	3,900	4,367	42,824 N (9,627 lb_{f})
7.65×53mm Mauser / 7×57mm	12.01	1.1329	3,900	4,418	43,327 N (9,740 lb_{f})
6.5×55mm	12.20	1.1690	3,800	4,442	43,563 N (9,793 lb_{f})
.30-06 Springfield / .308 Winchester	11.96	1.1234	4,150	4,662	45,722 N (10,279 lb_{f})
7.62×54mmR	12.37	1.2018	3,900	4,687	45,964 N (10,333 lb_{f})
8mm Lebel	13.77	1.4892	3,200	4,765	46,734 N (10,506 lb_{f})
7.5×55mm Swiss GP 11	12.64	1.2548	3,800	4,768	46,761 N (10,512 lb_{f})
.375 Holland & Holland Magnum / .300 Winchester Magnum	13.03	1.3335	4,300	5,734	56,230 N (12,640 lb_{f})
6.5×68mm / 8×68mm S	13.30	1.3893	4,400	6,113	59,947 N (13,477 lb_{f})
.375 Ruger / .416 Ruger	13.52	1.4356	4,300	6,173	60,539 N (13,610 lb_{f})
.277 FURY (SAAMI specifications)	11.95	1.1216	5,516	6,187	60,670 N (13,640 lb_{f})
.300 Remington Ultra Magnum	13.97	1.5328	4,400	6,744	66,139 N (14,869 lb_{f})
.300 Winchester Short Magnum	14.12	1.5659	4,400	6,890	67,567 N (15,190 lb_{f})
.338 Lapua Magnum	14.91	1.7460	4,200	7,333	71,914 N (16,167 lb_{f})
.300 Norma Magnum / .338 Norma Magnum	14.87	1.7366	4,400	7,641	74,935 N (16,846 lb_{f})
.300 Lapua Magnum / 7.62 UKM	14.91	1.7460	4,400	7,807	76,556 N (17,210 lb_{f})
.375 CheyTac / .408 CheyTac	16.18	2.0561	4,400	8,224	80,654 N (18,132 lb_{f})
.50 BMG	20.42	3.2749	3,700	12,117	118,829 N (26,714 lb_{f})
14.5×114mm	26.95	5.7044	3,600	20,536	201,387 N (45,274 lb_{f})

The P1 (cartridge case base) diameters and P_{max} used in the calculations were taken from the appropriate C.I.P. data sheets.

== See also ==
- Glossary of firearms terms
