= 7.62mm UKM =

Rifle cartridge

- Type: Rifle
- Place of origin: Germany

Service history
- In service: Never issued

Production history
- Designer: Michael Uekötter
- Designed: 2002
- No. built: small batch for C.I.P. registration

Specifications
- Parent case: .338 Lapua Magnum
- Case type: Rimless, bottleneck
- Bullet diameter: 7.82 mm (0.308 in)
- Neck diameter: 8.68 mm (0.342 in)
- Shoulder diameter: 14.06 mm (0.554 in)
- Base diameter: 14.91 mm (0.587 in)
- Rim diameter: 14.93 mm (0.588 in)
- Rim thickness: 1.52 mm (0.060 in)
- Case length: 57.00 mm (2.244 in)
- Overall length: 79.00 mm (3.110 in)
- Case capacity: 5.84 cm^{3} (90.1 gr H_{2}O)
- Rifling twist: 254 mm (1-10")
- Primer type: Large rifle magnum
- Maximum pressure: 440.00 MPa (63,817 psi)

Ballistic performance
Bullet mass/type	Velocity	Energy
155 gr (10 g) Lapua Scenar BTHP	3,468 ft/s (1,057 m/s)	4,141 ft⋅lbf (5,614 J)
168 gr (11 g) Sierra BTHP	3,300 ft/s (1,000 m/s)	4,062 ft⋅lbf (5,507 J)
181 gr (12 g) RWS TUG	3,240 ft/s (990 m/s)	4,219 ft⋅lbf (5,720 J)
185 gr (12 g) Berger BTHP	3,149 ft/s (960 m/s)	4,073 ft⋅lbf (5,522 J)
220 gr (14 g) Sierra BTHP	2,982 ft/s (909 m/s)	4,345 ft⋅lbf (5,891 J)
- Test barrel length: 27.5" (699 mm); Source(s)

The 7.62mm UKM [7.62×57mm] is a specialized rimless bottlenecked centerfire cartridge developed for long-range rifles. The commercially successful .338 Lapua Magnum cartridge has functioned as the parent case for the 7.62mm UKM, which is essentially a necked-down shortened version of the .338 Lapua Magnum. The .338 cartridge case was used for this since it has the capability to operate with high chamber pressures which, combined with smaller and hence lighter bullets result in high muzzle velocities.

== History ==
The 7.62mm UKM was developed by Michael Uekötter and C.I.P. (Commission Internationale Permanente pour l'Epreuve des Armes à Feu Portatives) certified in 2002, so it is an officially registered and sanctioned member of the Finnish "family" of super magnum rifle cartridges. The 7.62mm UKM is not commercially available today and currently (2008) exists only as a C.I.P. datasheet. It is however still used by a few shooters who produce the cases from .338 Lapua Magnum brass by reshaping the shoulder and neck, and handloading it with .30 calibre bullets.

== Cartridge dimensions ==
The 7.62mm UKM has a 5.84 ml (90 grains) H_{2}O cartridge case capacity. The exterior shape of the Lapua Magnum case was designed to promote reliable case feeding and extraction in bolt-action rifles and machineguns alike, under extreme conditions.

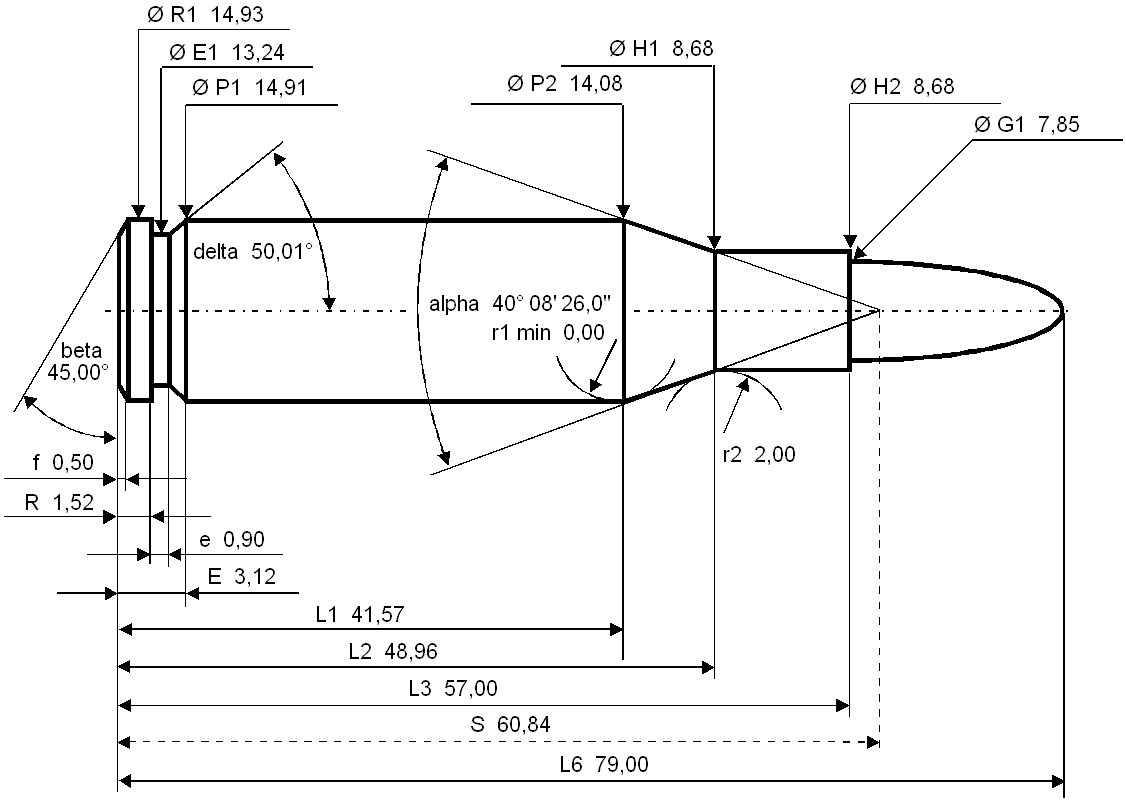

7.62mm UKM maximum C.I.P. cartridge dimensions. All sizes in millimeters (mm).

Americans would define the shoulder angle at alpha/2 ≈ 20 degrees. The common rifling twist rate for this cartridge is 254 mm (1 in 10 in), 6 grooves, Ø lands = 7.62 mm, Ø grooves = 7.82 mm, land width = 2.79 mm and the primer type is large rifle magnum.

According to the official C.I.P. (Commission Internationale Permanente pour l'Epreuve des Armes à Feu Portatives) rulings the 7.62mm UKM can handle up to 440.00 MPa (63,817 psi) P_{max} piezo pressure. This now prevails over the C.I.P. decisions and tables edition 2003, that rated the 7.62mm UKM at 470.00 MPa (68,168 psi) P_{max} maximum piezo pressure. In C.I.P. regulated countries every rifle cartridge combo has to be proofed at 125% of this maximum C.I.P. pressure to certify for sale to consumers. This means that 7.62mm UKM chambered arms in C.I.P. regulated countries are currently (2015) proof tested at 550.00 MPa (79,771 psi) PE piezo pressure.

This for rifles very high maximum allowed chamber pressure level indicates that the cases of the .300 and .338 Lapua Magnum and 7.62mm UKM are built extremely sturdy to cope with this for rifles very high operating pressure. The large boltface combined with the high 440 MPa maximum pressure makes that the 7.62mm UKM should only be chambered in rifles that are capable of handling such large and fierce cartridges and thus high bolt thrust safely. Chambering such powerful super magnum cartridges in rifles intended for normal magnum rifle cartridges and using 440 MPa loads can cause serious or fatal injury to the shooter and bystanders.

== Additional information ==
The 7.62 mm UKM’s main appeal is long-range shooting. Due to the large case capacity in relation to the 7.62 mm (.308 inch) calibre bore size the round is harsh on barrels like other .300 Magnum cartridges. In an Austrian based online forum "Leuchtspur.eu" the inventor Michael Uekötter claimed he needed to replace his Krieger custom barrel after more than 4,000 shots with the 7.62 mm UKM. A lot of thorough barrel cleaning (after every 5 to 10 shots) and carefully avoiding long strings of shots help to minimize barrel wear.

The American .300 Dakota proprietary cartridge, based on the .404 Jeffery case, is probably the closest (as of 2008) commercially available ballistic twin of the 7.62 mm UKM.

== See also ==
- List of rifle cartridges
- 7 mm caliber
- .300 Lapua Magnum
- .338 Lapua Magnum

== External links and sources ==
- QuickLOAD internal ballistics predictor computer program for fire arms
- C.I.P. TDCC sheet 7,62 UKM
