= A Rahman A Jamal =

Pro-Vice Chancellor of UKM Kuala Lumpur Campus, Universiti Kebangsaan Malaysia
- In office 15 November 2017 – 15 November 2020
- Chancellor: Tuanku Muhriz ibni Almarhum Tuanku Munawir

Founding Director of UKM Medical Molecular Biology Institute of National University of Malaysia
- In office 1 July 2003 – 15 November 2017
- Chancellor: Tuanku Muhriz ibni Almarhum Tuanku Munawir
- Succeeded by: Shamsul Azhar Shah

Personal details
- Born: 11 December 1960 (age 65) Johor
- Citizenship: Malaysia
- Education: Universiti Kebangsaan Malaysia and University College London (PhD)

A Rahman A Jamal is a Professor of Paediatric Haemato-Oncology and Molecular Biology and Senior Principal Research Fellow at UKM Medical Molecular Biology Institute (UMBI). He is the founding director of UMBI.

He was born on 11 December 1960 in Batu Pahat, Johor, Malaysia. He went to the Monfort Primary School in Batu Pahat and then to the High School Batu Pahat (1973-1975). He was the top student in the Lower Certificate Education (LCE) exams in HSBP. He then went to the Sekolah Menengah Sains Melaka (Malacca Science Secondary School) in 1976-1977. He was the captain of the school debating team and finished as the top student for the Malaysian Certificate of Education (MCE) exam. He was offered a scholarship to do engineering in Brighton UK but instead chose to study Medicine. He was in the group selected for Cairo University but a change in policy at the Ministry of Education, kept the group in Malaysia. He completed his matriculation studies at Sekolah Alam Shah Kuala Lumpur and was the top student not only in the school but nationwide. He attended the medical course at the Faculty of Medicine, Universiti Kebangsaan Malaysia and was the top student for Year 1 and Year 2, and was the recipient of the Biasiswa Kanan UKM Award (Special Scholarship Award). He was the president of the UKM Medical Students Association during his 4th year and contested in the Majlis Perwakilan Pelajar UKM (Students' Representative Body) elections and won a seat and held an exco position.

Upon graduation he did his housemanship training at General Hospital Kuala Lumpur (July 1985- June 1986). He was then posted to the Institute of Medical Research (IMR) for 18 months, and was attached to the Haematology Unit. He passed the Part 1 for the MRCP UK Exams in early 1988, and was then posted back to the GHKL to the Nephrology Institute and then back to the department of paediatrics. He passed the Part 2 of the MRCP (Ireland) paediatric exams in 1991 and was later gazetted as a specialist. He joined the Department of Paediatrics, Faculty of Medicine, UKM as a medical lecturer and a specialist in November 1991.
