= McMillan Tac-338 =

McMillan TAC-338
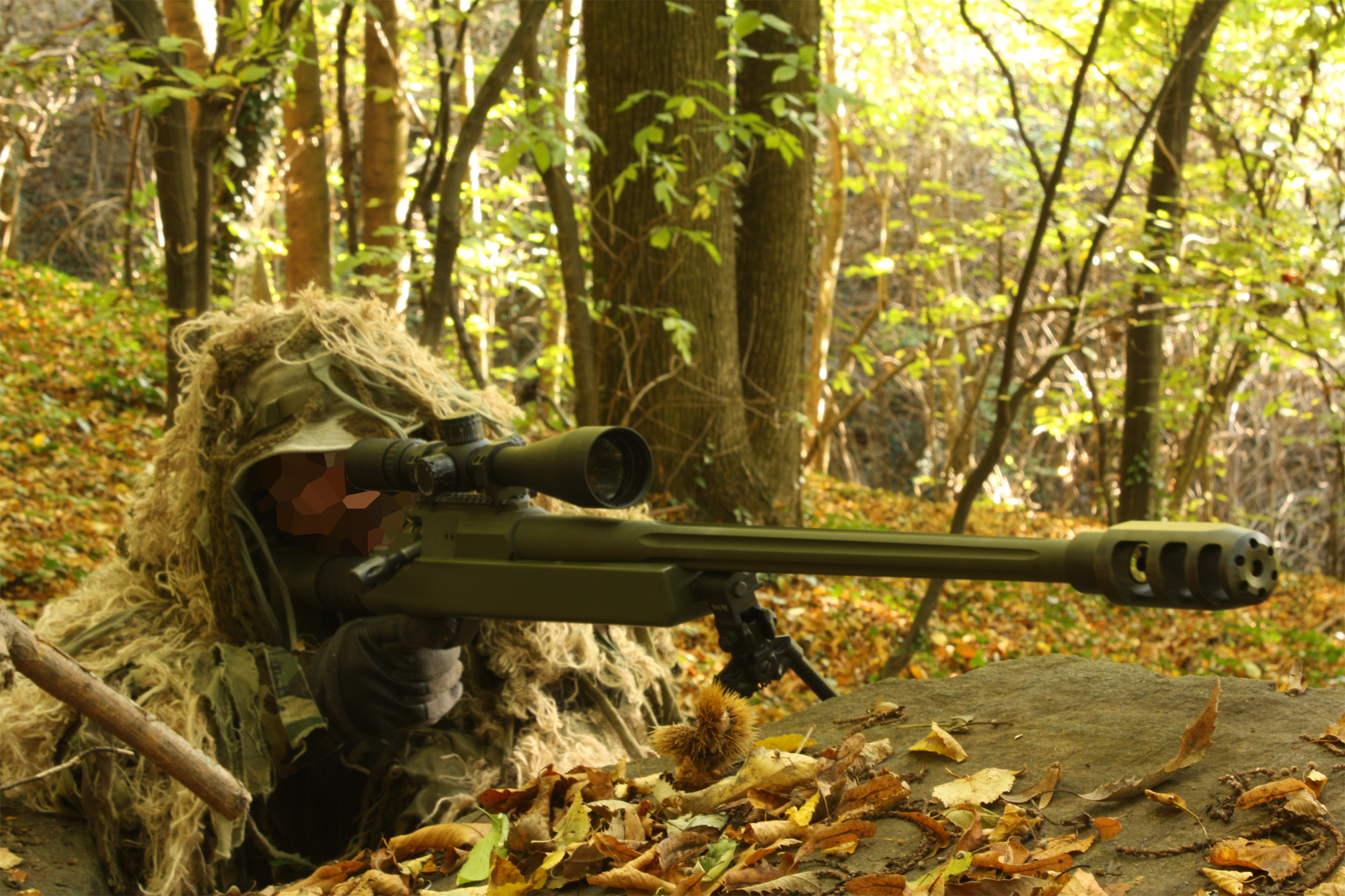
- McMillan TAC-338 with synthetic stock, chambered in .338 Lapua Magnum.
- Type: Bolt-action sniper rifle
- Place of origin: United States

Production history
- Designer: McMillan Firearms
- Manufacturer: McMillan Firearms

Specifications

The McMillan TAC-338 is a bolt-action rifle chambered in the .338 Lapua Magnum cartridge, designed and manufactured by McMillan Firearms for long-range precision shooting. It is widely used in military, law enforcement, and competitive shooting circles for its accuracy and reliability at extreme distances.

== Design and Features ==
The TAC-338 features a 27-inch (686 mm) medium-heavy barrel with a 1:9.35-inch twist rate, optimized for stabilizing heavy .338 Lapua Magnum projectiles. The barrel is fitted with a muzzle brake to reduce recoil and improve shooter control during rapid follow-up shots.

The rifle employs a synthetic or fiberglass stock (depending on configuration), which includes:

- An adjustable cheekpiece for customized ergonomics.
- Flush-mounted swivel cups for sling attachments.
- A spacer system to adjust length of pull.

Additional features include an adjustable trigger system (user-configurable pull weight) and a detachable 5-round box magazine. The receiver is drilled and tapped for mounting telescopic optics.

== Military Use ==
The TAC-338 has been adopted by the US Navy Special Warfare and by Israel's special forces.

Its .338 Lapua Magnum chambering allows effective engagement of targets at distances exceeding 1,500 meters (1,640 yards), making it suitable for counter-sniper and anti-materiel roles.

== Ordering ==
Due to its ITAR-restricted status, international sales require U.S. State Department approval.

== See also ==
- McMillan TAC-50
- CheyTac Intervention
- Barrett MRAD
