= Shamsul Azhar Shah =

Director of UKM Medical Molecular Biology Institute of National University of Malaysia
- Incumbent
- Assumed office 1 January 2018 - 31 December 2018
- Chancellor: Tuanku Muhriz ibni Almarhum Tuanku Munawir
- Preceded by: A Rahman A Jamal

Deputy Director of UKM Medical Molecular Biology Institute of National University of Malaysia
- Incumbent
- Assumed office 31 January 2016 - 31 December 2017
- Chancellor: Tuanku Muhriz ibni Almarhum Tuanku Munawir
- Preceded by: Wan Zurinah Wan Ngah
- Succeeded by: Neoh Hui-min

Personal details
- Born: 1 January 1967 (age 59) Perak
- Citizenship: Malaysia
- Education: UKM (BSc (Med)); UKM (MD); UKM (MCommHealth); Niigata (PhD)

Shamsul Azhar Shah is a Professor of Epidemiology and Statistics at UKM Medical Molecular Biology Institute (UMBI), and the 2nd director of UMBI.
