= H-S Precision Pro Series 2000 HTR =

Bolt-action sniper rifle

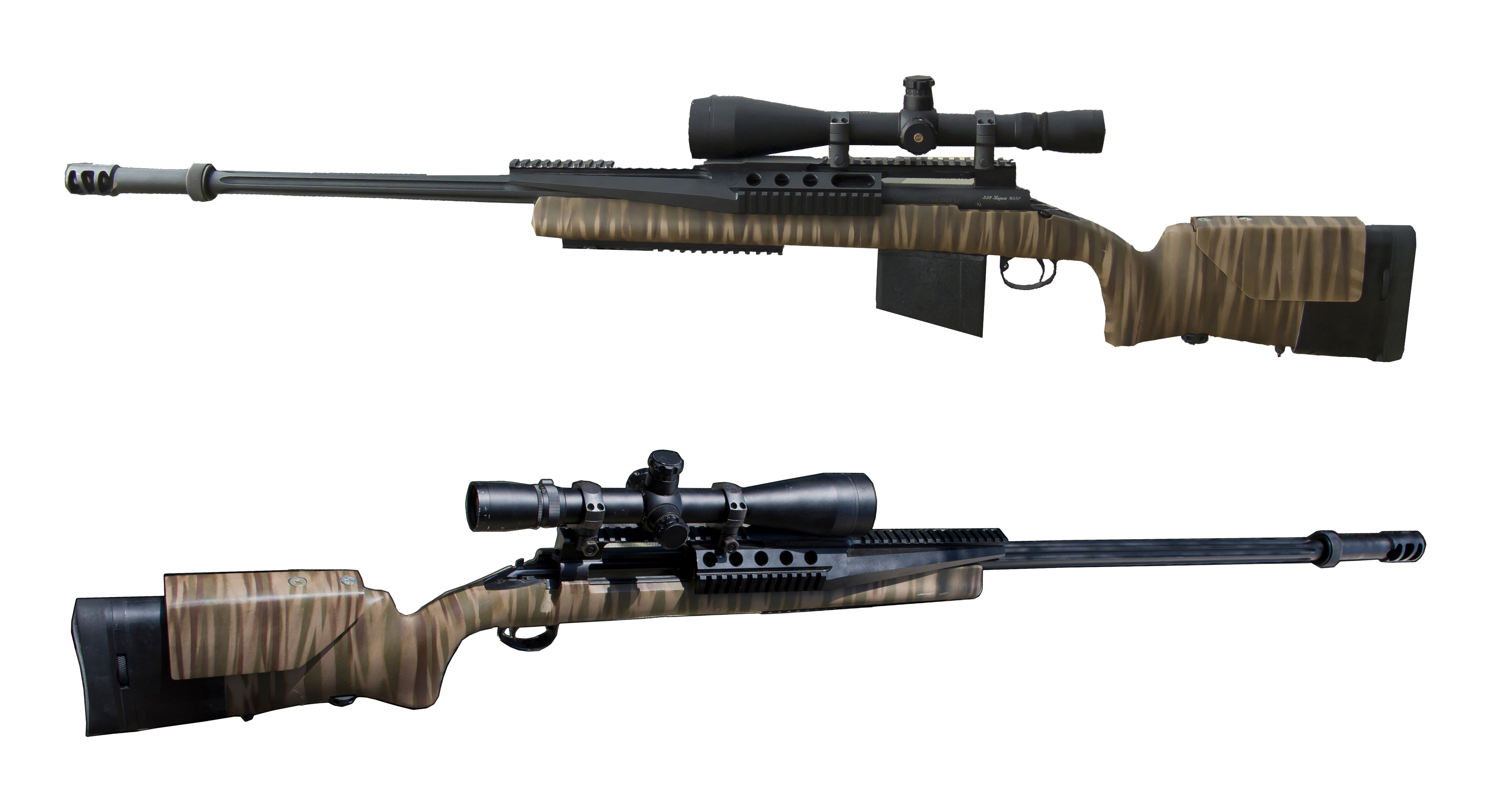
- The HTR 2000 rifle
- Type: Sniper rifle
- Place of origin: United States

Service history
- Used by: See Users

Production history
- Manufacturer: H-S Precision, Inc

Specifications
- Mass: 4.66–5.11 kg
- Length: 1130 mm
- Barrel length: 606 mm
- Cartridge: .338 Lapua Magnum.308 Winchester.300 Winchester Magnum
- Action: Bolt-action
- Muzzle velocity: 820–906
- Effective firing range: 800
- Maximum firing range: 1500
- Feed system: 4 rounds (standard calibers), 3 rounds (magnum calibers); 10-round detachable box magazine
- Sights: Telescopic; detachable backup iron sights

H-S Precision Pro 2000 HTR ("heavy tactical rifle") is a bolt-action sniper rifle. It was designed and manufactured by the American company H-S Precision, Inc. The rifle is very accurate: 0.8 minute of angle with 7.62×51mm NATO, about 0.4 minute of angle with match-grade ammunition and about 0.15 minute of angle with custom handloads.

== History ==
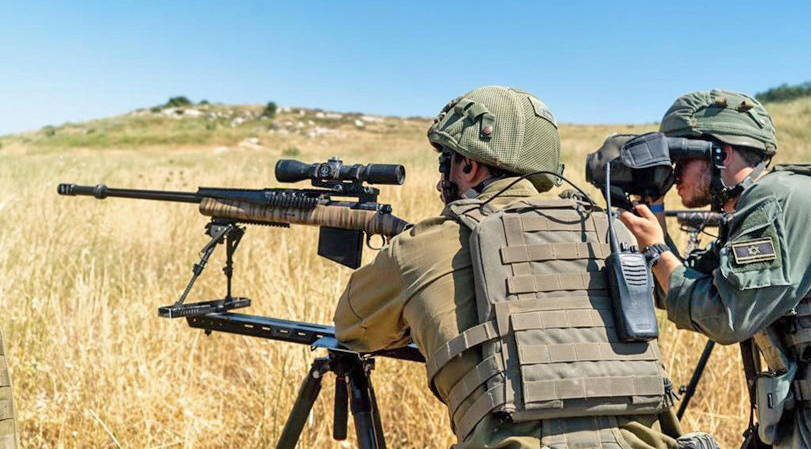
Israel Defense Forces snipers with the "Barak" (modified H-S Precision Pro 2000 HTR) sniper weapon system.

The Israel Defense Forces adopted an improved version of this rifle, as their long-range sniper rifle and named it "Barak". The contracts called for providing a Leupold Mark IV rings, a McCann rail mount system, a Hardigg hard case, an infrared target illuminator, five 7-round mags, a Harris bipod, a detachable muzzle brake, a cleaning/maintenance kit, and a Tripod Data Systems PDA running the Horus Vision ballistic software alongside a suppressor and night vision systems.

In 2012, the IDF mentioned that several of the Baraks underwent modifications under the supervision of Ashbury due to the need of finding suitable ammo.

== Design ==
The Barak is chambered .338 Lapua Magnum with a 28-inch (711 mm) barrel and can achieve accuracy of 0.5-0.25 minute of angle with IMI match-grade 250 grain ammunition.

The sniper rifle has an effective range of 1,300 yards (1,200 m) and maximum range of 1,600 yards (1,500 m).

== Users ==
- Israel: Used by the IDF.
- United States: Used by the FBI Hostage Rescue Teams.
