= GOL Sniper Magnum =

GOL-Sniper Magnum
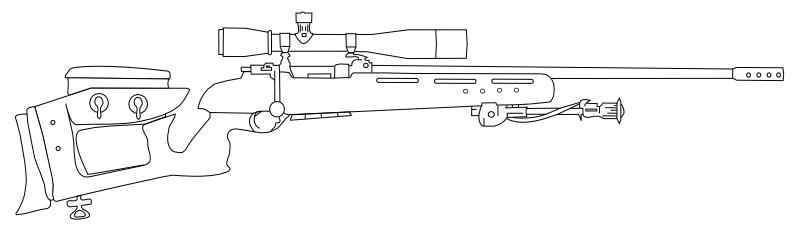
- GOL Sniper Magnum rifle
- Type: Sniper rifle
- Place of origin: Germany

Service history
- Used by: See Users

Production history
- Designer: Gottfried Prechtl
- Designed: 1986
- Manufacturer: Gol-Matic GmbH
- Produced: 1986-present day

Specifications
- Mass: ~ 6 kg, varies on configuration
- Length: Varies on configuration
- Barrel length: 710mm
- Cartridge: 7.62×51mm NATO, .300 Winchester Magnum, .338 Lapua Magnum
- Action: Bolt-action
- Effective firing range: up to 1,500 metres (1,640 yd)
- Feed system: 5 rounds detachable box magazine
- Sights: Telescopic

The GOL-Sniper Magnum is a bolt-action sniper rifle designed by the German company Gol-Matic GmbH of Birkenau, Hesse. The rifle is available in tactical as well as sporting and match configurations. GOL-Sniper rifles are based on custom Magnum Mauser actions, manufactured by Prechtl Waffen.

== Design ==
The rifle was designed by professional German gunsmith Gottfried Prechtl, who specializes in custom Mauser rifles. The bolt-action is based on Mauser's M98 Magnum system, which was introduced in the late 19th century on the Mauser Gewehr 98. Each rifle is custom made per requisitions of every customer, whether it is for tactical or sporting purposes, resulting in many options and configurations. A Sto-Con walnut stock forms the body of the rifle which is mounted with a Lothar Walther precision barrel and Mauser bolt. The walnut stock increases the flexibility of the rifle butt and therefore reduces recoil allowing for more precision when shooting.

== Users ==
- Germany: Used by several police units.
- Lithuania: Lithuanian Armed Forces.
