= UKM Medical Molecular Biology Institute =

Malaysian research institute

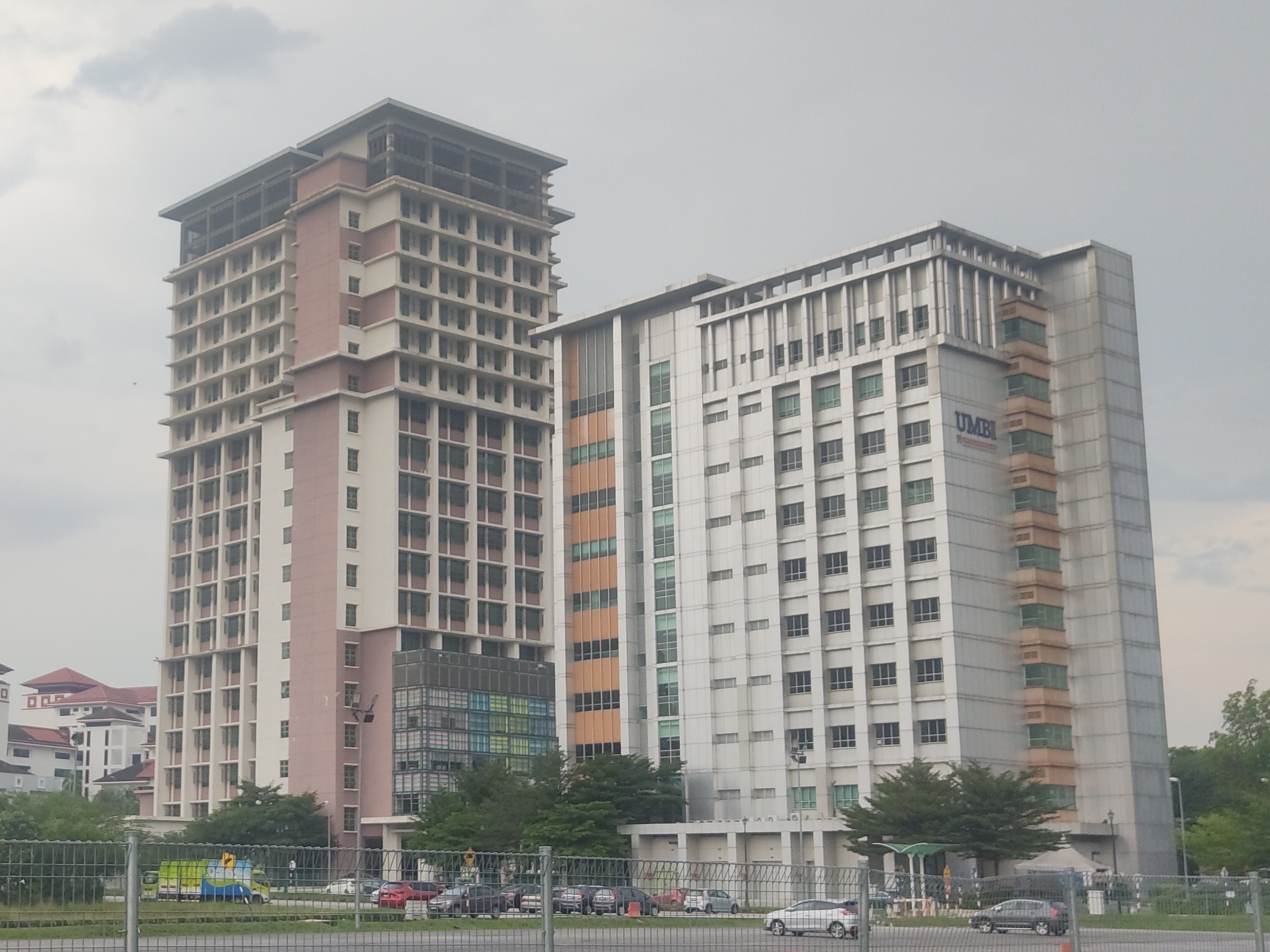
- Established: 2003; 22 years ago
- Research type: Basic (non-clinical)
- Field of research: Cancer, Genomics, Proteomics, Bioinformatics, Biomedicine
- Director: Nor Azian Abdul Murad
- Location: Bandar Tun Razak, Kuala Lumpur
- Campus: UKM Medical Centre
- Affiliations: National University of Malaysia
- Website: www.ukm.my/umbi

The UKM Medical Molecular Biology Institute, usually referred to as UMBI, is a biomedicine and cancer research institute located in Bandar Tun Razak, Kuala Lumpur, Malaysia. The institute is one of research institute in National University of Malaysia (UKM). UMBI was established in 2003. The institute has been recognized as a Center for Excellence in Higher Education (HICoE) in 2009 by the Prime Minister of Malaysia.

== History ==
The UKM Medical Molecular Biology Institute (UMBI) was founded as one of the Centre of Excellence in UKM after the approval from the National University of Malaysia senate meeting. UMBI was officially established in July 2003 with the operating budget allocated to this new institute of RM 25 thousand. Professor Datuk Dr. A Rahman A Jamal has been appointed as a founding director of UMBI since 2003 until his tenure ends in 2017.

== Director ==
- Professor Datuk Dr A Rahman A Jamal 2003 - 2017
- Professor Dr Shamsul Azhar Shah 2018 - 2019
- Dr Nor Azian Abdul Murad 2019 - current
