= .300 Lapua Magnum =

Rifle cartridge

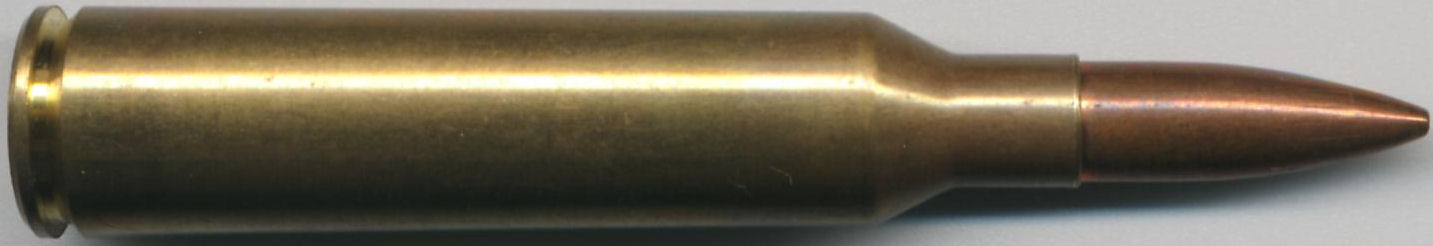
- Type: Rifle
- Place of origin: Finland

Production history
- Designer: Lapua
- Designed: 1989
- No. built: small batch for C.I.P. registration

Specifications
- Parent case: .338 Lapua Magnum
- Case type: Rimless, bottleneck
- Bullet diameter: 7.82 mm (0.308 in)
- Neck diameter: 8.73 mm (0.344 in)
- Shoulder diameter: 13.82 mm (0.544 in)
- Base diameter: 14.91 mm (0.587 in)
- Rim diameter: 14.93 mm (0.588 in)
- Rim thickness: 1.52 mm (0.060 in)
- Case length: 69.73 mm (2.745 in)
- Overall length: 94.50 mm (3.720 in)
- Case capacity: 7.34 cm^{3} (113.3 gr H_{2}O)
- Rifling twist: 240 mm (1-9.45")
- Primer type: Large rifle magnum
- Maximum pressure (C.I.P.): 440.00 MPa (63,817 psi)

Ballistic performance
Bullet mass/type	Velocity	Energy
10.0 g (154 gr) Lapua Scenar BTHP	1,096 m/s (3,600 ft/s)	6,027 J (4,445 ft⋅lbf)
11.0 g (170 gr) Lapua LockBase BTSP	1,040 m/s (3,400 ft/s)	5,986 J (4,415 ft⋅lbf)
12.0 g (185 gr) Lapua Scenar BTHP	1,010 m/s (3,300 ft/s)	6,135 J (4,525 ft⋅lbf)
13.0 g (201 gr) Sierra BTHP	980 m/s (3,200 ft/s)	6,216 J (4,585 ft⋅lbf)
14.0 g (216 gr) Sierra BTHP	950 m/s (3,100 ft/s)	6,406 J (4,725 ft⋅lbf)
- Test barrel length: 690 mm (27.2 in); Source: AccuLoad

The .300 Lapua Magnum (7.62×70mm) is a rimless, bottlenecked, centerfire cartridge developed for long-range rifles. The parent case of the .300 Lapua Magnum is the .338 Lapua Magnum necked down to a smaller caliber. The .338 cartridge case was selected to withstand high chamber pressures. Combining these high pressures with smaller, lighter bullets than its parent case, .300 Lapua Magnum loadings have high muzzle velocities.

== History ==
The Finnish ammunition manufacturer Lapua obtained a C.I.P. certification for the .300 Lapua Magnum, so it became an officially registered and sanctioned member of the Finnish 70 mm family of super magnum rifle cartridges. The .300 Lapua Magnum is no longer commercially available. It is still used by a few shooters, who produce the cases from .338 Lapua Magnum cases by reshaping the shoulder and neck, and handloading it with .30 caliber bullets.

Up to the C.I.P. decisions and tables edition 2007 the .300 Lapua Magnum was rated at 470.00 MPa (68,168 psi) P_{max} piezo pressure, This high P_{max} has been reduced by the C.I.P. since then to 440.00 MPa (63,817 psi) P_{max}.

== Cartridge dimensions ==
The .300 Lapua Magnum's case has a 7.34 mL (113 grains of water) capacity. The exterior shape of the case was designed for reliable case feeding and extraction in bolt-action rifles, semi-automatic and automatic firearms, including under extreme conditions.

.300 Lapua Magnum maximum C.I.P. cartridge dimensions. All sizes in millimeters (mm).

The common rifling twist rate for this cartridge is 240 mm (1 turn in 9.45 inches), with 4 grooves. The diameter of the lands is 7.62 mm; the diameter of the grooves is 7.82 mm. Land width is 4.47 mm and the primer type is large rifle magnum.

According to the C.I.P., the .300 Lapua Magnum can handle up to 440.00 MPa (63,817 psi) P_{max} piezo pressure. In C.I.P. regulated countries, every rifle and cartridge combination must be proof tested at 125% of the maximum C.I.P. pressure to be certified for sale to consumers.

The high pressures involved mean that the .300 Lapua Magnum should only be chambered in rifles that are specifically designed for extremely high-powered cartridges. Chambering such powerful super magnum cartridges in rifles intended for normal magnum rifle cartridges and using P_{max} loads can cause serious or fatal injury to the shooter and bystanders. A rifle that theoretically could safely be chambered for the 94.5 mm long .300 Lapua Magnum is the bolt-action SAKO TRG-42. This rifle was designed for .338 Lapua Magnum cartridges and can handle cartridges up to 95 mm in overall length.

== Additional information ==
The .300 Lapua Magnum's main appeal is long-range shooting. Due to the large case capacity in relation to the bore diameter (known as overbore) the .300 Lapua Magnum is harsh on barrels and typically wears them out in 1,000 to 1,500 rounds. Thorough cleaning and avoiding numerous consecutive shots help to minimize barrel wear. This makes this cartridge impractical for most competition and professional long-range shooters, such as military snipers, who tend to fire many rounds in practice to acquire and maintain expert long-range marksmanship.

The 2008 Vihtavuori reloading guide states that, when loaded with heavy .30 caliber bullets and fired out of a 690 mm (27 in) barrel, the .300 Lapua Magnum has lower muzzle energy compared to the .338 Lapua Magnum.

The belted .30-378 Weatherby Magnum cartridge, introduced in 1996, and the rebated-rim .300 Remington Ultra Magnum cartridge, introduced in 1999, are probably the closest commercially available ballistic equivalents of the .300 Lapua Magnum.

== See also ==
- List of rifle cartridges
- 7 mm caliber
- 7.62mm UKM
- .338 Lapua Magnum
