= QuickLOAD =

Software for firearms calculations

- Developer(s): Hartmut G. Brömel
- Stable release: 3.9
- Operating system: Microsoft Windows
- Available in: German and English
- Website: www.quickload.co.uk

QuickLOAD is an internal ballistics predictor computer program for firearms.

For computations apart from other parameters,

- the cartridge
- the projectile (bullet)
- the gun barrel length
- the cartridge overall length
- the propellant type and quantity

must be entered for calculating an estimated maximum chamber gas piezo pressure, muzzle velocity, muzzle pressure and other relevant data.

== QuickLOAD database ==
QuickLOAD has a default database of predefined bullets, cartridges and propellants. The database of the more recent versions of QuickLOAD also include dimensional technical drawings of the predefined cartridges and for most cartridges photographic images. Data can later be imported or entered by the user to expand the programs database. The default database contains more than 2,500 projectiles, over 1,200 cartridges, over 225 powders and dimensional drawings and photos of many cartridges. The default database however contains some errors, so measuring sizes, weights and case capacities of components intended for use and if appropriate correcting default provided data is wise to avoid surprises and make the predictions more accurate.

Some default data is incomplete, since it was not released by the manufacturer or when components that are neither officially registered with nor sanctioned by C.I.P. (Commission Internationale Permanente Pour L'Epreuve Des Armes A Feu Portative) or its American equivalent, SAAMI (Sporting Arms and Ammunition Manufacturers’ Institute) come into play. Such wildcat cartridges have no official dimensions nor other performance related specifications.

== Cartridge case volume establishment ==
Besides the standard entered information, the actual internal volume or cartridge case capacity of the used cases is an important parameter for QuickLOAD to obtain usable predictions. The internal case volume has to be established by weighing empty once-fired cartridge cases from a production lot, then filling the cases with fresh or distilled water up to the point of overflowing and weighing the water-filled cases. The added weight of the water is then used to establish the liquid volume and hence the case capacity. This liquid volume measurement method can be practically employed to about a 0.01 to 0.02 ml or 0.15 to 0.30 grains of water precision level for firearms cartridge cases. A case capacity establishment should be done by measuring several fired cases from a particular production lot and calculating their average case capacity. This also provides insight into the uniformity of the sampled lot.

A water case capacity test measurement of 4 fired .35 Whelen Remington cases resulted in:

Measured case capacity (ml)	4.57	4.54	4.52	4.60
Average H_{2}O case capacity (ml) = 4.56

The case capacity of different cartridge brands of a particular chambering can significantly vary between cartridge case manufacturers and even production lots. The default database of QuickLOAD for example contains 5 different .300 Winchester Magnum case capacities for 5 different cartridge case manufacturers.

== Practical use and limitations ==
QuickLOAD mainly helps reloaders understand how changing variables can affect barrel harmonics, pressures and muzzle velocities. It can predict the effect of changes in ambient temperature, bullet seating depth, and barrel length. However, QuickLOAD has limitations, as it is merely a computer simulation. It does not account for different brands of primers for example, and its ability to predict the effect of seating bullets into the rifling is crude. A QuickLOAD user most certainly should not just "plug in" a cartridge, bullet and powder and use that load, assuming it is safe. It is good practice to double- or triple-check QuickLOAD's output against reliable load data supplied by the powder producing companies. Of course the best way to check firearms cartridge loads are actual proof test measurements at certified test facilities.

== QuickTARGET external ballistics predictor computer program ==
The QuickLOAD interior ballistics predictor program also contains the external ballistics predictor computer program QuickTARGET. QuickTARGET is based on the Siacci/Mayevski G1 model and gives the user the possibility to enter several different BC G1 constants for different speed regimes to calculate ballistic predictions that more closely match a bullet's flight behaviour at longer ranges in comparison to calculations that use only one BC constant.

In 2008 QuickTARGET Unlimited was introduced as an additional part of the QuickLOAD/QuickTARGET 3.4 version software suite. QuickTARGET Unlimited is an enhanced beta version of QuickTARGET that can take several long range factors into account to make the external ballistic predictions more accurate. For this it can use several drag models; G1, G5, G7, etc. and a custom drag function that uses drag coefficient (C_{d}) data. In January 2009 the Finnish ammunition manufacturer Lapua published Doppler radar tests derived drag coefficient data for most of their rifle projectiles. The predictive capabilities of the custom mode are based on actual bullet flight data derived from Doppler radar test sessions. With this data engineers can create algorithms that utilize both known mathematical ballistic models as well as test specific, tabular data in unison. Besides the data for Lapua bullets QuickTARGET Ultimate also contains C_{d} data for some other projectiles that are often used for extended range shooting.

== Computer requirements ==
QuickLOAD/QuickTARGET 3.6 version and up is compatible only with the Microsoft Windows 7 to Windows 11 operating system. The software suite can be used with metric units and imperial units/United States customary units and was created and is maintained by mechanical engineer Mr. Hartmut G. Brömel in Babenhausen, Germany. QuickLOAD is distributed in the United States, Canada, Mexico, South Africa, Australia and New Zealand a by NECO (Nostalgia Enterprises Company) and Europe except Germany, Czech Republic, Denmark, Finland and Ukraine by JMS Arms.
