= List of equipment of the Canadian Armed Forces =

This is a list of equipment currently in use by the Canadian Armed Forces. It includes the land equipment in use by the Canadian Army and Primary Reserve, the Canadian Special Operations Forces Command, the Canadian Joint Operations Command, the Royal Canadian Navy, and the Royal Canadian Air Force.

== Individual equipment ==
Model	Image	Origin	Type	Quantity	Notes
Uniform equipment
CG634		Canada	Combat helmet		Canadian version of the SPECTRA helmet originally produced by GSI/MSA. Standard issue combat helmet of the Canadian Forces.
CM735		United Kingdom; Canada	Combat helmet	16,001	Improved variant of the CG634 produced by NP Aerospace and Morgan Advanced Materials.
Galvion Batlskin Caiman		CanadaUnited States	Combat helmet	44,500	Selected in March 2023 for the Dismounted Infantry Capability Enhancement (DICE) program. Options and follow-on orders bring total purchased to over 44,000 helmets and 100,000 helmet covers as of March 2026.
CVCMH		Canada	Vehicle crew helmet		Canadian designation Canadian Vehicle Crew Modular Helmet. Modular helmet issued to Canadian Army vehicle crews.
Fragmentation Protective Vest		Canada	Body armour	31,000	Commercial name Model 4100. Manufactured by Pacific Safety Systems.
Sniper Body Armour System		Canada	Body armour	319	Used exclusively by Canadian Forces snipers. Option for an additional 240 systems. System consists of the SBAS External Carrier, SBAS Plate Carrier, and SBAS Ballistic Panel.
Military Police Body Armour		Canada	Body armour		Used exclusively by Canadian Forces Military Police.
Tactical Vest		Canada	Carrier rig	50,246	Manufactured by Fellfab Ltd.
C5 CBRN Low Burden Mask		Canada	Gas mask	77,800	Includes 155,600 filter canisters.
C4 CBRN Mask		Canada	Gas mask		Used C7A filter canisters.
Horizon 1 Chemical Warfare Coverall		Canada	NBC suit	50,000	Originally purchased in 2004. Manufactured by Pacific Safety Systems. Due to be replaced.
CADPAT MT		Canada	Camouflage		Selected as new primary camouflage pattern of Canadian Army
Tools and melee weapons
CAN bayonet 2000		Canada	Bayonet/combat knife		Replaced C7 knife-bayonet after 2004, used with C7A2 and C8A3.
Gerber soldiers' multi-tool		Canada	Multi-tool	53,853	Stainless steel multi-tool with pliers, a file, a drop point knife blade, a serrated knife blade, multiple flat-head screwdrivers, a wire cutter, a can opener, a bottle opener, a lanyard, and a metric/imperial ruler.
SOG multi-tool		Canada	Multi-tool		Matte black stainless steel multi-tool with explosive detonator crimper, locking blades, and a saw blade.
Radios and communications equipment
Rheinmetall Canada Argus Integrated Soldier System suite		Canada	Networked soldier system	4,138	Each suite includes weapons accessories, radios, a headset, a GPS receiver, and a smartphone running a battle management system.
Harris Falcon III PRC-152A		United States	Personal role radio		Purchased in 2014 as part of the Falcon III tactical radio system.
Selex Personal Role Radio		Italy; United Kingdom	Personal role radio	7,200	1,200 originally purchased followed by 6,000 additional units in 2006.
Harris Falcon III PRC-117G		United States	Manpack radio		Purchased in 2014 as part of the Falcon III tactical radio system.
Harris Falcon III RF-7800H		United States	Manpack radio		Purchased in 2014 as part of the Falcon III tactical radio system.
Harris PRC-117F(C)		United States	Manpack radio	100	Originally purchased with satellite antennas in 2005.
Specialized equipment
Allen-Vanguard EOD9		Canada	Bomb suit		
Minelab F3 C		Australia	Mine detector	600	
T-11 Parachute System		United States; Canada	Parachute	600	
CT-2 Parachute		Canada	Parachute		
CT-1 Parachute		Canada	Parachute		
CT-6 Military Freefall Parachute		Canada	Parachute		

== Small arms ==
Model	Image	Origin	Type	Calibre	Variants	Quantity	Notes
Pistols
SIG Sauer P320		United States	Pistol	9×19mm NATO	C22 C24	19,700	Initially used only by CANSOFCOM. In Oct. 2022, contract awarded for additional P320s(Canadian designation C22) to replace the Hi-Power as the general service pistol for the Canadian Armed Forces. Delivery completed in March 2024 of 16,500 new C22 pistols for the Canadian Army, Royal Canadian Navy, and Royal Canadian Air Force, and 3,200 more compact C24 pistols for the Military Police Group.
Submachine guns
Heckler & Koch MP5		West Germany	Submachine gun	9×19mm NATO	MP5-N MP5A2 MP5A3 MP5SD		Issued primarily to naval boarding parties and CANSOFCOM.
FN Herstal P90		Belgium	Personal defence weapon	5.7x28mm NATO			Used exclusively by Joint Task Force 2.
Assault rifles and carbines
Colt Canada C7		Canada	Assault rifle	5.56×45mm NATO	C7 C7A1 C7A2		C7 originally issued in 1984, and C7A1 in 1990. C7A2 is a mid-life upgrade based on early experience in the War in Afghanistan, and is the standard issue assault rifle of the Canadian Forces.
Colt Canada C8		Canada	Assault rifle/Carbine	5.56×45mm NATO	C8 C8A1 C8FTHB C8SFW C8A3 C8IUR		C8A3 is a mid-life upgrade to earlier C8 models, and is the standard-issue carbine of the Canadian Forces.
Colt Canada CMAR		Canada	Assault rifle/Carbine	5.56×45mm NATO	C25 (GS) C26 (FS)		Contract awarded to Colt Canada in March 2026 to acquire up to 65,402 rifles under the Canadian Modular Assault Rifle (CMAR) project. These replacements for existing C7A2s and C8A3s will consist of 16,195 rifles in the Full Spectrum (FS) variant intended for front-line combat roles, and 49,207 of the General Service (GS) variant intended for broader use across the CAF.
Patrol rifles
Colt Canada C19		Finland; Canada	Bolt-action rifle	7.62x51mm NATO			Licensed-built version of the Tikka T3. Standard issue rifle of the Canadian Rangers.
Shotguns
Remington 870		United States	Pump-action shotgun	12-gauge	870P		Tactical shotgun for close-quarters combat and obstacle breaching.
Benelli M3		Italy	Pump-action/semi-automatic shotgun	12-gauge	Super 90		Used exclusively by Joint Task Force 2.
Machine guns
FN/Colt Canada C9		Belgium; Canada	Squad automatic weapon	5.56×45mm NATO	C9 C9A1 C9A2		Standard issue infantry support weapon. C9A2 mid-life upgrade manufactured by Colt Canada.
FN/Colt Canada C6		Belgium; Canada	General-purpose machine gun	7.62×51mm NATO	C6 C6A1 FLEX		Standard issue general-purpose machine gun of the Canadian Forces. C6 being phased out for C6A1 FLEX version, with a total of 4,964 being procured.
M2 Browning		United States	Heavy machine gun	12.7x99mm NATO	M2HB-QCB GAU-21		Standard issue heavy machine gun. M2HB-QCB and GAU-21 versions in service with Royal Canadian Navy and CANSOFCOM.
Sniper rifles
Colt Canada C20 DMR		Canada	Designated marksman rifle	7.62×51mm NATO			272 rifles purchased in November 2020 to replace C8 carbines in Canadian Forces sniper teams. Expected to become standard issue starting in March 2021.
SAKO TRG M10 Rifle		Finland; Canada	Sniper rifle	7.62×51mm NATO,.338 Lapua Magnum		229	Purchased to replace the C14 Timberwolf as the standard-issue medium-range sniper rifle of the Canadian Forces. Designated as the C21 Multi-Caliber Sniper Weapon.
Accuracy International AW		United Kingdom	Sniper rifle	7.62×51mm NATO	AWP		AWP variant used exclusively by Joint Task Force 2.
McMillan TAC-50		United States	Anti-material rifle	12.7×99mm NATO			Canadian designation C15 Long-Range Sniper Weapon.
Barrett M82A1		United States	Anti-material rifle	12.7×99mm NATO			Used exclusively by Joint Task Force 2.
Portable anti-tank weapons
M72 LAW		United States; Norway	Disposable anti-tank weapon	66mm	M72A5 M72C7		Canadian designation M72A5-C1.
AT4		Sweden	Disposable anti-tank weapon	84mm			Used exclusively by Joint Task Force 2.
Carl Gustaf 8.4cm recoilless rifle		Sweden	Recoilless rifle	84mm	M2 M3 M4		M3 version used by Regular Forces, M2 version by Primary Reserve. M4 version in use with CANSOFCOM. Additional order of M4 for Canadian Army in May 2025.
ATGMs
Spike		Israel	Anti-tank guided missile	130mm	Spike-LR		Procured in 2016 by CANSOFCOM and used in Operation Impact. Further purchase made in 2023 for the Canadian Brigade in Latvia.
BGM-71 TOW		United States	Anti-tank guided missile	152mm			Around 40 with Improved Target Acquisition System (ITAS) currently in service. Estimated 33,000 missiles in storage until 2025.
Grenades and explosives
Diemaco M203A1		United States; Canada	Under-barrel grenade launcher	40mm			Variant of the Colt M203 produced by Colt Canada.
EAGLE grenade launcher		Canada	Stand-alone & Under-barrel grenade launcher	40mm			Designated as the C27.
Heckler & Koch GMG		Germany; Canada	Automatic grenade launcher	40mm			Canadian designation C16 Close Area Suppression System. License built by Rheinmetall Defence Canada. 304 in service with the Canadian Army.
M67 Grenade		United States; Canada	Hand grenade	64mm			Canadian designation C13 grenade.
C8 Smoke Grenade		Canada	Smoke grenade	N/A			Produced by General Dynamics Canada.
C19 Defensive Command Detonated Weapon		United States; Canada	Command-detonated directional anti-personnel mine	N/A			Canadian version of the M18 Claymore mine that can only be manually detonated. In use as of 2015.

== Vehicles ==
=== Armoured fighting vehicles ===
See Tanks of Canada for additional details and discussion.

Model	Image	Origin	Type	Quantity	Notes
Leopard 2A6M/2A6M C2		Germany	Main battle tank	20	20 Leopard 2A6M were leased from Germany in December 2007. The tanks were permanently transferred to Canadian service when tanks purchased from the Netherlands were transferred to Germany in exchange.
Leopard 2A4/2A4M		West Germany	Main battle tank	54	100 Leopard 2A4s originally purchased from the Netherlands in 2007. 20 were upgraded to Leopard 2A7 configuration and transferred to Germany in exchange for the 2A6Ms. 20 upgraded to 2A4M CAN version with extra belly armour for mine protection, additional modular armour and other enhancements. A total of 42 tanks have been retained for training. In January, 2023 four Leopard 2A4s were donated to the Ukrainian Armed Forces, and a second batch of four was donated in February 2023, for a total of eight tanks, reducing the number of Leopard 2A4s in Canadian service to 54.
TLAV M113A3/MTVL		United States	Armoured personnel carrier	73 (in 2023)	1,143 M113A1 series vehicles originally purchased in the 1960s and 1970s. Additional M113A2 series vehicles purchased in the 1980s, alongside an upgrade program for existing M113A1 series vehicles to the M113A2 standard. Of these, 289 vehicles were upgraded in the 2000s to the M113A3 & MTVL standard under the Armoured Personnel Carrier Life Extension (APCLE) Program and later designated the Tracked Light Armoured Vehicle (TLAV) series. Only 135 in service as of 2015. Includes 33 M577A3 Command Post vehicles. To be replaced by the LAV 6.0 ACSV between 2020 and 2025.
Bison		Canada	Armoured personnel carrier	155	199 originally purchased in 1990, with 198 re-built and re-roled from 2004 to 2010. Configurations include Command, Control, Communications and Intelligence (82), Ambulance (32), Maintenance and Recovery (32), Mobile Repair Team (32), Electronic Warfare (16), and Nuclear Biological Chemical Defence (4). To be replaced by the LAV 6.0 ACSV between 2020 and 2025.
LAV 6.0		Canada	Infantry fighting vehicle	616	651 LAV III originally purchased. 550 upgraded to LAV 6.0 standard under the LAV UP program in 2019. Configurations consist of 278 Infantry Section Carrier (ISC), 181 Command Post Vehicle (CPV), 47 Observation Post Vehicle (OPV), and 44 Engineer LAV (ELAV). Additional 66 vehicles are being upgraded to LAV 6.0 standard under the LAV Recce Surveillance System (LRSS) program by 2020.
LAV 6.0 ACSV		Canada	Infantry support vehicle	550 on order	Replacement for M113 and Bison vehicles. Order for 360 vehicles placed with General Dynamics Canada in August 2019. Configurations consist of 41 Troop Cargo Vehicle (TCV), 49 Ambulance, 97 Command Post Vehicle, 19 Engineer Vehicle, 18 Electronic Warfare Vehicle, 54 Maintenance Recovery Vehicle, 70 Mobile Repair Team, and 13 Fitter/Cargo Vehicle. At Oct. 2025, 128 vehicles had been delivered. A further 190 vehicles were ordered in July 2026, bringing the total future fleet to 550.
TAPV		Canada	Armoured patrol vehicle	500	193 in Reconnaissance configuration, and 307 in General Utility configuration. A total of 364 are equipped with Protector RWS. Used for reconnaissance, troop transport, command & control, VIP transport, patrolling, and military police duties.

=== Engineering vehicles and equipment ===
Model	Image	Origin	Type	Quantity	Notes
ARV 3 M		Germany	Armoured recovery vehicle	11	Converted by Rheinmetall Canada from Leopard 2A4s purchased from Switzerland in 2010. Initial contract for 8 vehicles was awarded in November 2011 and extended to a further 4 vehicles in 2012. A Leopard 2-based ARV was donated to the Ukrainian Armed Forces in 2023, reducing the number in Canadian service to 11.
WISENT 2		Germany	Armoured engineer vehicle	18	Converted from Leopard 2A4s purchased from the Netherlands in 2007. FFG Canada was awarded a contract for the conversion in May 2012.
ARV Taurus		Germany	Armoured recovery vehicle	8(?)	Uses Leopard 1 chassis. Only 8 remained in service in 2015. All were due to be phased out by 2018. Current status unknown.
Cougar H JERRV		United States; South Africa	Armoured engineer vehicle	7	40 originally purchased as part of the Expedient Route Opening Capability set of vehicles. Remaining vehicles upgraded with WOLF IED Detect & Defeat system after 2017.
Buffalo A2		United States; South Africa	Mine clearing system	5	19 originally purchased. Part of the Expedient Route Opening Capability set of vehicles.
Husky		South Africa	Mine clearing system	5	Part of the Expedient Route Opening Capability set of vehicles.
Galion 850 series		United States	Road grader	N/A	To be replaced under the Common Heavy Equipment Replacement (CHER) project which aims to replace 18 classes of construction and material-handling platforms, and will be procured in eight different bundles of certain types (bulldozers, graders, excavators, backhoes, compactors, trailers, container handlers and forklifts). Among the mandatory requirements will be ballistic and blast protection.
Krupp KMK 2025		Germany	Crane	20	Militarized vehicles originally purchased in 1992. To be replaced under the Common Heavy Equipment Replacement (CHER) project.
JCB JS130		United Kingdom	Tracked excavator	6	To be replaced under the Common Heavy Equipment Replacement (CHER) project.
JCB 220X		United Kingdom	Tracked excavator	2	To be replaced under the Common Heavy Equipment Replacement (CHER) project.
Arva Industries MPEV		Canada	Front-end loader/Backhoe loader	27	Canadian designation Multi-Purpose Engineering Vehicle. Can be equipped with Armet armoured cab kit. To be replaced under the Common Heavy Equipment Replacement (CHER) project.
Felix Technologies Compact Tracked Loader		Canada	Compact tracked loader	1	To be replaced under the Common Heavy Equipment Replacement (CHER) project.
Medium Floating Bridge/Medium Floating Raft		Germany	Ribbon floating bridge	N/A	Purchased in early 1980s. Includes Boat, Bridge Erection (BBE) engineering boat, and can be configured as a floating bridge or ferry. Used as a support bridge. To be replaced under the Bridge and Gap Crossing Modernization (BGCM) project which will deliver six capabilities: Short, medium, and long support bridges; heavy assault bridges; line-of-communication bridges; and heavy floating bridges.
WFEL Medium Girder Bridge		United Kingdom	Medium girder bridge	N/A	Used as a support bridge. To be replaced under the Bridge and Gap Crossing Modernization (BGCM) project.
ACROW 700XS Bridge		United States	Bailey bridge	N/A	Used as a Line of Communication (LoC) bridge. To be replaced under the Bridge and Gap Crossing Modernization (BGCM) project.

=== Utility vehicles ===
Model	Image	Origin	Type	Quantity	Notes
M-Gator		United States	Light utility vehicle/All-terrain vehicle	48	Used by the Canadian Army and Royal Canadian Air Force.
MRZR-D		United States	Light utility vehicle/All-terrain vehicle	36	Includes 12 tactical trailers, these vehicles are used by light infantry battalions. Purchased as a "buy and try" (trial) platform to help determine requirements for the Tactical Mobility Platform (TMP) project which aims to procure between 300 and 330 ultra-light tactical mobility platforms, with 210 to 230 being tactical variants, and 90 to 100 being cargo variants. The TMP should be capable of transporting enough equipment, including weapons, ammunition and water to sustain soldiers for 48 to 72 hours.
DAGOR		United States	Light utility vehicle	62	Canadian designation Ultra Light Combat Vehicle. All purchased in 2017 and 2018. Used exclusively by CANSOFCOM.
HMMWV		United States	Light utility vehicle	N/A	Includes M1113 SOV and Up-Armored variants. Life extended until 2024. Used exclusively by CANSOFCOM. To be replaced by 60 JLTV through US Foreign Military Sale approved in August 2025.
ASUV		Japan	Sport utility vehicle	27	Up-armoured variant of Toyota Land Cruiser 200. Canadian designation Armoured Sport Utility Vehicle. Used exclusively by CJOC.
LUVW MilCOTS		United States	Light utility vehicle	1,061	Replaced the Bombardier Iltis. Militarized Commercial Off-The-Shelf configuration based on the Chevrolet Silverado 2500HD - 2003 Basic model 861 (GM K25943HD). Colloquially known as the "Milverado." For use in a non-hostile environment. The Light Utility Vehicle program seeks to replace both the Silverado and G-Wagen with vehicles possessing built-in or bolt-on armour protection from IEDs and small arms fire.
LUVW SMP		Germany	Light utility vehicle	1,159	Replaced the Bombardier Iltis. Based on the Mercedes-Benz G-Wagon. Includes 170 armour kits. The Light Utility Vehicle program seeks to replace both the Silverado and G-Wagen with vehicles possessing built-in or bolt-on armour protection from IEDs and small arms fire.
Bv206		Sweden	Tracked utility vehicle	14	First used in combat during Operation Anaconda in March, 2002. 78 originally purchased. 14 rebuilt in late 2000s and expected to last into early 2020s. Will be replaced under the Domestic Arctic Mobility Enhancement project, a purchase of around 100 vehicles is expected, and potential candidates include the ST Kinetics Bronco 3 and the BAE Systems Hägglunds BvS 10 Beowulf.
Infantry Squad Vehicle		United States	Light utility vehicle	90	Described as Light Tactical Vehicles, 90 vehicles with an option for a further 18 were purchased from GM Defense under Phase 1 of the Canadian Army's Light Forces Enhancement (LFE) Project. The Canadian brigade in Latvia will receive 36 cargo and 54 personnel variants of the vehicle by October 2024. Phase 2 of the project for up to 222 Tactical Mobility Platforms may see a different vehicle purchased.

=== Logistics vehicles ===
Model	Image	Origin	Type	Quantity	Notes
LSVW		Canada	Light support vehicle	1,333	Based on Iveco model 40.10 with trailer units. 2,879 originally procured. To be replaced under the Logistics Vehicle Modernization program, the Light Support Vehicle Wheeled (LSVW) will be replaced with new light trucks and trailers of a 4 to 5 tonne cargo capacity, modules to mount on the trucks and trailers that will provide accommodation space to conduct various tasks (such as office space and workshops), and an armoured protection kit for the cab.
MSVS MilCOTS		United States	Medium logistics vehicle	1,300	Replaced all MLVW from 2009, with final vehicles delivered in 2011. There are 6 variants, 4 with the extended cab (A) 895 - 21’ cargo w/ seat & tarp; (B) 128 - 21’ cargo w/ cage; (C) 32 - 16’ deck w/ cargo crane; (D) 100 - 21’ flatbed; and 2 variants with 9 man cab (E) 94 - 13’ artillery w/ tarp; (F) 51 - 10’ deck w/ auger. These vehicles are intended for domestic, peacetime use by the Canadian Army Primary Reserve.
MSVS SMP		FranceCanada	Medium logistics vehicle	1,587	1,587 trucks based on the Kerax 8x8 platform ordered in 2015 from Mack Trucks Defense. All vehicles are designated as MSVS Standard Military Pattern with either the armored cab or the soft cab. Due to be delivered by Fall 2020. Configurations include Troop Carrying Cargo Vehicle (603), Load Handling System Vehicle (742), Material Handling Crane Vehicle (50), Mobile Repair Team Vehicle (155), and Gun Tractor (37). Main production in France by Renault Trucks (Marolles-en-Hurepoix), shipped to Canada for final integration.
HLVW		Canada	Heavy logistics vehicle	591	Based on Steyr 1491 Percheron truck chassis and built under license by Urban Transportation Development Corporation. 1,212 originally purchased. To be replaced under the Logistics Vehicle Modernization program, the Heavy Logistics Vehicle Wheeled (HSVW) fleets will be replaced with a new heavy truck and trailer with a 16.5 tonne cargo capacity, trailers for engineer construction equipment and to transport a main battle tank, modules for accommodation and specialized cargo (such as fuel) and an armoured protection kit for the cab.
AHSVS		Germany	Armoured Heavy Support Vehicle Systems	86	Includes 12 tank transports and 5 heavy recovery vehicles. Option for additional 26. To be replaced under the Logistics Vehicle Modernization program, the Heavy Logistics Vehicle Wheeled (HSVW) fleets will be replaced with a new heavy truck (HX44M). A variant of the new heavy truck capable of pulling 72,000 kg (a main battle tank) and an armoured protection kit for the cab will be acquired.
Western Star 4900 series		United States	Heavy engineer support vehicles	59	Used to transport Reverse Osmosis Water Purification Unit (Advanced Double-pass Portable Reverse-Osmosis Water Purification Unit). To be replaced under the Logistics Vehicle Modernization program, the Heavy Logistics Vehicle Wheeled (HSVW) fleets will be replaced with a new heavy truck with trailers for engineer construction equipment, modules for specialized cargo (such as fuel) and an armoured protection kit for the cab.
Mercedes-Benz Zetros		GermanyCanada	Light/Heavy logistics vehicles	1,500	To replace various light and heavy vehicle fleets under the Logistics Vehicle Modernization program. Contract awarded to General Dynamics Land Systems Canada in May 2024 for a Zetros-based platform. Approximately 1,000 light (4x4) and 500 heavy (8x8) trucks, as well as associated equipment such as armoured protection kits, modules, containers, and trailers are to be delivered beginning in 2026 to 2028, with Initial Operational Capability (IOC) by 2027 to 2029, and Full Operational Capability (FOC) by 2029 to 2031.
RMMV HX44M Heavy Recovery Vehicle		GermanyCanada	Heavy Recovery vehicles	100	To replace the HLVW recovery vehicles and AHSVS heavy recovery vehicles under the Enhanced Recovery Capability Project, with two Contracts awarded to Rheinmetall Canada Inc. in November 2024 for a HX2 series-based platform. A total of 85 HX44M (8x8) Heavy Recovery vehicles and associated equipment such as 24 modular armoured cabin (MAC) kits, 85 heavy towing and recovery modules, associated ancillary equipment and integrated logistics support are to be delivered beginning in 2027. Options to procure 15 additional vehicles and modular armoured cabins were subsequently exercised.

=== Unmanned ground systems ===
Model	Image	Origin	Type	Quantity	Notes
ROMECS		Canada	Remotely-operated Mine clearance system	4	Canadian designation Remotely Operated Mechanical Explosive Clearance System. Replaced Aardvark JFSU, 4 in service as of 2015.
MATS		Canada	Remotely-operated CBRN reconnaissance system	4	Canadian designation Multi-Agent Tactical Sentry. All vehicles plus 4 control stations and 2 command post systems originally delivered in 2004, and upgraded in 2013. Used exclusively by the Canadian Joint Incident Response Unit.
Telerob tEODor		Germany	EOD robot	25	Largest EOD robot in Canadian Army service, to remain in service until around 2030.
Allen-Vanguard MkIII		Canada	EOD robot	N/A	Mid-sized EOD robot.
ECA Cobra Mk2		France	EOD robot	20	Mini-sized EOD robot, due to be retired after 2025.
ECA CAMELEON LG		France	EOD robot	9	Small EOD robot. 9 originally purchased, with an option for 4 more.
Nexter NERVA-LG		France	Multi-purpose robot	9	Multi-purpose robot capable of changing roles depending on the installed modules.
Nexter NERVA-XX		France	Multi-purpose robot	79	Multi-purpose robot capable of changing roles depending on the installed modules.
iRobot SROV		United States	CBRN reconnaissance robot	20	Canadian designation Small Remotely Operated Vehicles.

=== Unmanned aerial systems ===
Model	Image	Origin	Type	Quantity	Notes
RQ-21 Blackjack		United States	Medium unmanned aerial vehicle	10	Canadian designation CU-172 Blackjack. 1 system with 5 aircraft acquired in 2016. A second system with 5 aircraft ordered in 2019 for delivery in summer 2022. The DND was also the first international customer for the UAS.
RQ-11B Raven		United States	Miniature UAV	15	Canadian designation CU-179 Raven-B.
Black Hornet 3		Norway	Micro unmanned aerial vehicle	3	Trial systems used by the Canadian contingent of the Latvian NATO enhanced Forward Presence Battle Group as part of Operation REASSURANCE.
Teal 2		United States	Miniature UAV	50	Acquired in 2024 by both Army and RCN for ISTAR tasks.
Huntsman X6		United Kingdom	Miniature UAV	100	Contract awarded Sept. 2026 to Volatus Aerospace for an initial quantity of 100 of this UK-built ISR quadcopter. Options to buy up to 4,900 additional drones are included.
Astiia		Australia	Miniature UAV	100	Contract awarded Sept. 2026 to Draganfly for an initial quantity of 100 of this Australian-designed, Canadian-produced ISR quadcopter. Options to buy up to 4,900 additional drones are included.
Parrot ANAFI UKR		France	Miniature UAV	N/A	To be delivered to CFMP by the end of 2026 to "support policing, security and operational support tasks in both domestic and international deployed environments".
AeroVironment Switchblade		United States	Loitering munition	N/A	In Feb. 2025, a $67m contract awarded for an unknown quantity of Switchblade 300 and 600 loitering munitions systems to be deployed in Latvia.

=== Aircraft ===
All Canadian Forces aircraft, except for small unmanned aerial vehicles, fall under the command of the Royal Canadian Air Force.

== Sensors ==
=== Radars ===
Model	Image	Origin	Type	Quantity	Notes
EL/M-2084 STAR		Israel	3D AESA multi-function radar	10	Canadian designation AN/MPQ-504 Medium Range Radar. Trailer-mounted multi-function radar used for counter-battery and air surveillance roles. Operated by the 4th Artillery Regiment (General Support).
AN/TPQ-49 LCMR		United States	Counter-battery radar	N/A	Canadian designation Lightweight Counter Mortar Radar. Purchased in 2007 from the United States Army via Foreign Military Sales.
AN/PPS-5C MSTAR		United Kingdom; United States	Surface surveillance radar	200	Canadian designation Man-portable Surveillance and Target Acquisition Radar. 200 MSTAR Version 3 systems originally purchased in 2004, with 100 to be upgraded to Version 4. Version 3 currently deployed on the Coyote Reconnaissance Vehicle. Version 6 to be integrated on the LAV 6.0 under the LAV Reconnaissance Surveillance Systems project.

=== Passive sensors ===
Model	Image	Origin	Type	Quantity	Notes
HALO Acoustic Weapon Locating System		United Kingdom	Acoustic artillery sensor	N/A	Canadian designation Weapon Locating Sensor Acoustic Sensor. Entered service in 2010.
Persistent Surveillance System		Canada	Electro-optical surveillance system	8	Includes aerostat-mounted electro-optical surveillance system and tower-mounted electro-optical/radar surveillance system.

== Artillery and air defence ==
=== Field artillery ===
Model	Image	Origin	Type	Calibre	Quantity	Notes
L16		United Kingdom	Mortar	81mm	218	Systems currently being reassigned from the Royal Canadian Artillery to Regular Force and Primary Reserve infantry battalions.
C3 Close Support Gun		United States	Howitzer	105mm	93	Upgraded C1 Howitzer, a Canadian built version of the American M101 howitzer. Used as training guns, and to support Parks Canada in clearing avalanches.
LG1 Mark II		France	Howitzer	105mm	28	The LG1 was upgraded to the Mark II standard in 2005 to increase reliability and lifespan.
M777		United Kingdom	Howitzer	155mm	33	XM982 Excalibur 155mm artillery shells purchased for use with the M777. Four of original 37 guns were donated to Ukraine. To be replaced by 80–102 self-propelled howitzers under the Indirect Fires Modernization program.
M142 High Mobility Artillery Rocket System		United States	Multiple launch rocket system	227mm GMLRS 610mm ATACMS		A US Foreign Military Sale was approved in Oct. 2025 in response to a Canadian request to buy 26 HIMARS launchers, 328 GMLRS pods, 64 ATACMS pods, and related equipment. The formal contract was reportedly signed in Jan. 2026, and in Apr. 2026 production of HIMARS for Canada was confirmed in DoD contract announcements.The Canadian Army is planning to take delivery of the first systems in 2029.

=== Air defence systems ===
	Image	Origin	Type	Calibre	Quantity	Notes
RBS 70 NG		Sweden	Man-portable surface-to-air missile	106mm		Contract awarded to Saab in Feb. 2024 for an unspecified number of systems. Canadian troops in Latvian NATO battle group will receive first systems later in 2024.
Falcon Shield		United Kingdom	Counter unmanned air system			Part of counter-UAS suite acquired for Canadian forces in Latvia in Feb. 2024. Contract awarded to Leonardo UK Ltd. for unspecified number of fixed-site systems, with IOC in Fall 2024.
ORION-H9		Singapore	Counter unmanned air system			Part of counter-UAS suite acquired for Canadian forces in Latvia in Feb. 2024. Contract awarded to TRD Systems for unspecified number of dismounted directional systems, with IOC in Fall 2024.
CACI BEAM 3.0		United States	Counter unmanned air system			Part of counter-UAS suite acquired for Canadian forces in Latvia in Feb. 2024. Contract awarded to CACI Inc. for unspecified number of man-portable omni-directional systems, with IOC in Fall 2024. Additional $169m contracts for vehicle-mounted omnidirectional systems and in-service support were awarded to CACI in July 2025, with delivery expected in Fall 2026.

== See also ==
- Historical Equipment of the Canadian Military
- Planned Canadian Forces projects
