= List of historical equipment of the Canadian military =

Flag of Canada used during WWII and the Korean War

This is a list of infantry weapons used by the Canadian military throughout its history and military arms used by militaries in pre-Confederation conflicts in Canada.

== Colonial era to Confederation (1604–1867) ==
=== Black powder rifles, carbines and pistols ===
Model	Type	Service period	Origin	Details
Charleville 1717	Flintlock	1717-1840	Kingdom of France
Charleville 1728	Flintlock	1728-1840	Kingdom of France
Charleville 1746	Flintlock	1746-1840	Kingdom of France
Fusil de Grenadier Tulle	Flintlock	1690-????	Kingdom of France
Fusil de chasse Tulle	Flintlock	1700s	Kingdom of France
Queen Anne Musket	Flintlock	1702-1840	British Empire
William III Carbine	Flintlock	1700s	British Empire
Nock Carbine	Flintlock	1780-1790s	British Empire
Elliot Carbine	Flintlock	1770s	British Empire
Brown Bess Long Land, Short Land, India Patterns	Flintlock	1722	British Empire
Baker rifle	Flintlock	1801-1837	British Empire
Lovells Pattern 1838 musket and Double Barrel Carbine	Caplock	1883	British Empire
Pattern 1842 Musket	Caplock	1842-1853	British Empire
Pattern 1851 Rifle	Caplock	1851	British Empire
Pattern 1853 Enfield	Caplock	1853	British Empire
Lancaster Rifle	Caplock	1855-1869	British Empire
Brunswick rifle	Caplock	1840-????	British Empire
Colt 1851 Navy Revolver	Caplock Revolver	1856-1885	United States	255 revolvers marked Lower Canada (LC), 556 marked Upper Canada (UC), Issued to Cavalry

=== Service rifles and carbines ===
Model	Type	Service period	Origin	Details
Starr carbine	Breechloading	1861-1860s	United States
Spencer rifle and carbine	Breechloading repeater	1860-1860s	United States
Westley Richards rifle	Breechloading	1812-1871	British Empire
Peabody rifle	Breechloading	1860s-1871	United States
Snider-Enfield	Breechloading	1860s-1901	British Empire	Carbine version carried west by the N.W.M.P. in 1873

== Confederation to First World War (1867–1914) ==
=== Service pistols ===
Model	Type	Service period	Origin	Details
Colt Model 1878 Frontier	Revolver	1885-1902	United States	Double Action in .45 Long Colt with 7.5" barrel, purchased initially for the Riel Rebellion
Colt "New Service" Revolver	Revolver	1900-1928	United States	Double Action in .45 Long Colt or .455 Eley (as marked on 5.5" barrel), swing out cylinder for fast shell extraction and reloading. Also used by the RNWMP & RCMP from 1905 to 1954.

=== Service rifles ===
Model	Type	Service period	Origin	Details
Martini–Henry	Breech-loading	1871-1888	British Empire
Winchester	Repeating rifle	1873-1918	United States
Martini–Metford	Breech-loading	1894-1902	British Empire
Martini–Enfield	Breech-loading	1878-1902	British Empire
Lee–Metford	Bolt action	1895-1926	British Empire
Lee–Enfield Mk.I	Bolt action	1896-1905	British Empire
Ross Mk.I and Mk.II	Straight-pull	1905-1915	Canada

== First World War to Second World War (1914–1939) ==
=== Service pistols ===
Model	Type	Service period	Origin	Details
Webley Mk IV	Revolver	1887-1928	British Empire	Chambered in .455 Webley
Enfield No 2	Revolver	1932-1945	British Empire
Colt New Service	Revolver	1900-1928	United States	Also used by the NWMP and RCMP from 1905 to 1954. Chambered in .455 Webley
Colt M1911	Semi-automatic pistol	1914-1945	United States
Smith & Wesson Model 44	Revolver	1915-1951	United States	2nd model. First orders were rechambered from .44 Special to .455 Webley

=== Rifles ===
Model	Type	Service period	Origin	Details
Ross Mk.III	Straight-pull	1913-1916	Canada	Withdrawn from infantry service following poor performance in battlefield conditions. Replaced by the Lee–Enfield Mk.III.
Lee–Enfield (SMLE) Mk.III	Bolt action	1916-1943	British Empire

=== Machine guns ===
Model	Type	Service period	Origin	Details
Colt-Browning M1895	Heavy machine gun	1914-1916	United States
Vickers Machine Gun	Medium machine gun	1914-1919	British Empire
Lewis Machine Gun	Light machine gun	1916-1939	British Empire

=== Armoured fighting vehicles ===
Model	Type	Service period	Origin	Details
Armoured Autocar	Armoured Car	1914-1918	United States; Canada	2 ton commercial Autocar truck chassis covered with armour plate and armed with 2 Vickers machine guns. 20 purchased (8 machine gun carrier, 5 ammunition and supply carrier, 4 Officer Transport, 1 gasoline carrier, 1 repair vehicle, 1 ambulance)
Mk.V tank	Tank	1918	British Empire	Used by the Canadian Tank Corps in 1918. Never used in combat.
Carden-Loyd tankette/MG Carrier	Tank	1937, 1931	British Empire
Vickers Light Dragon Mk III		1937	British Empire
GM armoured car	experimental light armoured car	1935	Canada	Built on General Motors of Canada Maple Leaf truck chassis
Ford armoured car	experimental light armoured car	1935	Canada	Built on Ford Motor Company of Canada BB truck chassis
Triumph Model H	dispatch motorcycle	1914-??	British Empire

== Second World War to Cold War (1939–1946) ==
=== Infantry weapons ===
Model	Type	Service period	Origin	Details
Smith & Wesson "Military & Police Victory model"	Revolver	1939-1964	United States
Inglis Hi-Power	Semi-automatic pistol	1944–2024	Canada	License-made Canadian version of the Browning Hi-Power. Was fully replaced in March 2024 by the SIG Sauer P320 designated as the C22/C24.
Thompson M1928-M1A1	Submachine gun	1940-1945	United States
Sten MK.II	Submachine gun	1942-1958	United Kingdom; Canada	Produced in Canada
Lee–Enfield SMLE Mk.III	Service rifle	1916-1943	United Kingdom
Lee–Enfield No.4 Mk.I	Service rifle	1943-1955	Canada	Used by Canadian Rangers until 2016, replaced by Colt C-19
M1 Garand	Service rifle	1944-1953	Canada; United States	A small number of M1, M1C and M1D rifles, enough to equip a brigade, were issued to the Canadian Army
Boys ATR	Anti-tank rifle	1937-1943	United Kingdom
Bren LMG	Light machine gun	1939-1955	United Kingdom
Browning Automatic Rifle (BAR)	Automatic rifle	1933-1953	United States
M1941 Johnson Machine Gun	Light machine gun	1942-1944	United States	1st Special Service Force (Devil's Brigade) only
C5 GPMG	General purpose machine gun	1939-1980s	United States	M1919 Browning
M2 HMG	Heavy machine gun	1940–Present	United States
Bangalore torpedo	Obstacle Clearing Charge	1940–Present	United Kingdom
PIAT	Anti-tank weapon	1943-1950s	United Kingdom
Bazooka	Rocket launcher	1942-1977	United States	In Reserve Force inventory as late as 1977
Flamethrower, Portable, No 2 "Ack-Pack"	Flamethrower	1943-1945	United Kingdom

=== Utility vehicles ===
The majority of utility vehicles used by Canadian forces came from the CMP program, otherwise known as the Canadian Military Pattern truck. This program produced more utility vehicles than Germany, Japan, and Italy combined.

Model	Type	Service period	Origin	Details
Willys Jeep	Light Utility Vehicle	1941-1970s	United States
Morris C8	Artillery tractor	1940-1945	United Kingdom
AEC Matador	Artillery tractor	1940-1945	United Kingdom
Diamond T 4-Ton lorry	4 ton truck	WWII	United States
Ford F-8	1/2 ton truck	WWII	Canada	Built by Ford Motor Company of Canada. Canadian Military Pattern truck
Ford F-15	3/4 ton truck	WWII	Canada	Built by Ford Motor Company of Canada. Canadian Military Pattern truck.
Ford F-30	1.5 ton truck	WWII	Canada	Built by Ford Motor Company of Canada. Canadian Military Pattern truck.
Ford F-60S, F-60L, F-60H, F-60T	3 ton truck	WWII	Canada	Built by Ford Motor Company of Canada. Canadian Military Pattern truck.
Ford FGT	Artillery tractor	WWII	Canada	Built by Ford Motor Company of Canada. Canadian Military Pattern truck.
Chevrolet C-8, C-8A	1/2 ton truck	WWII	Canada	Built by General Motors Canada Canadian Military Pattern truck.
Chevrolet C-15, C-15A	3/4 ton truck	WWII	Canada	Built by General Motors Canada Canadian Military Pattern truck.
Chevrolet C15TA Armoured Truck	Armoured truck	WWII	Canada	Built by General Motors Canada Canadian Military Pattern truck.
Chevrolet C-30, C-60S, C-60L, C-60X	1.5/3 ton truck	WWII	Canada	Built by General Motors Canada Canadian Military Pattern truck.
CMP FAT	Artillery tractor	1940-????	Canada	Built by General Motors Canada Canadian Military Pattern truck.
Harley-Davidson Motorcycle WLC	militarize motorcycle	1941-1956	United States	Sometimes used with sidecars
Norton Motorcycle WD16H / 16H	militarize motorcycle	1940-??	United Kingdom
Triumph Motorcycles TRW	motorcycle	1940s-??	United Kingdom
Matchless G3L	motorcycle	1940s	United Kingdom
Welbike lightweight motorcycle	lightweight motorcycle	1942-1945?	United Kingdom
Dodge Chrysler D-8A	1/2 ton truck	WWII	Canada	Built by Chrysler Canada Canadian Military Pattern truck.
Dodge Chrysler D-15	3/4 ton truck	WWII	Canada	Built by Chrysler Canada Canadian Military Pattern truck.
Dodge Chrysler D-60S, D-60S/DD, D-60L, D-60L/D, D-60L/DD	3 ton truck	WWII	Canada	Built by Chrysler Canada Canadian Military Pattern truck.

=== Scout vehicles ===
Model	Type	Service period	Origin	Details
Daimler Dingo	Armoured car	1940-1945	United Kingdom
Daimler Mk. I armoured Car	Armoured car	1941-1945	United Kingdom
Humber Mk. I scout car	Armoured car	1942-1945	United Kingdom
Humber Mk. IV armoured car	Armoured car	1941-1945	United Kingdom
Fox armoured car	Armoured car	1939-1945	Canada
M3 scout car	Armoured car	1942-1945	United States
Otter light reconnaissance car	Armoured car	1942-1945	Canada	Built by General Motors of Canada. Based on the C15
Staghound armoured car	Armoured car	1942-1962	United States
Lynx scout car	Armoured car	1940-1968	United Kingdom; Canada
M5 reconnaissance vehicle	Reconnaissance vehicle	1942-1945	United States	A turretless variant of the M5 light tank

=== Armoured carriers and armoured tractors ===
Model	Type	Service period	Origin	Details
Kangaroo		1943-1945	Canada	Converted Ram, Priest, and Sherman AFVs (See respective entries)
Loyd Carrier		WWII	United Kingdom
Universal Carrier		1940-?	United Kingdom
Wasp		WWII–?	United Kingdom	Universal Carrier with flame-thrower equipment
T-16 Carrier		WWII–?	United States	Universal carrier produced under license and modified in the United States.
Windsor Carrier		1944–1945	Canada	Canadian-built universal carrier with a lengthened body
M3A1 half-track		WWII	United States
M5 half-track			United States
M9 half-track			United States

=== Tanks ===
==== Combat tanks ====
Model	Type	Service period	Origin	Details
Stuart tank	Light tank	1941-1945	United States
Churchill MkI-IV	Infantry tank	1941-1945	United Kingdom
Sherman I, III, V	Medium tank	1941-1970	United States	Sherman I (M4), III (M4A2 w/75 mm gun) and V (M4A4 w/75 mm gun) used.
Sherman IC (Firefly)	Medium Tank	1941-1945	United States/United Kingdom	M4 with a 17 pounder gun
Sherman VC (Firefly)	Medium tank	1944-1945	United States/United Kingdom	M4A4 with a 17 pounder gun
Grizzly	Medium tank	1941-1945	Canada	Canadian built and modified M4A1
Sherman V DD	Medium Tank	1944-1945	United States	M4A4 {75 mm} with Duplex Drive system and flotation screen for amphibious landings
Sherman Ib	Close Support Tank		United States	M4 with a 105 mm howitzer
Centaur IV	Close Support Tank	1944-1944	United Kingdom	In service for less than a month with the 1st Canadian Centaur Battery (formed Aug 6, 1944 - disbanded Aug 29, 1944), RCA, after landing in Normandy. Tanks returned to the Royal Marines.
Ram Badger	Flame tank	1941-1944	Canada
Churchill Oke	Flame tank		United Kingdom
Sherman Badger	Flame tank		United States

==== Training tanks ====
Model	Type	Service period	Origin	Details
Carden Loyd Mk IV tankette	Tankette	1930-????	United Kingdom	Used for training
Light Tank Mk VIA	Light tank		United Kingdom
Six Ton Tank Model 1917	Light tank		United States	US built version of the Renault FT.
Ram tank I and II	Cruiser tank		Canada	Never saw combat. Training only
Vickers Valentine Mark VI	Infantry tank		Canada	Canadian built version of the British Valentine IV. 30 used for training.
Matilda II	Infantry tank		United Kingdom
Lee/Grant	Medium tank		United States

=== Self-propelled artillery and anti-aircraft ===
Model	Type	Service period	Origin	Details
M3 75mm gun motor carriage	Self-propelled artillery		United States	M3 half-track equipped with the M1A1 75 mm gun
Sexton	Self-propelled artillery	1943–1956	Canada	Open box superstructure on a Ram tank hull. Armed with a 25pdr gun
M7 Priest	Self-propelled artillery	1944–????	United States/Canada	Open box superstructure on a Sherman tank hull. Armed with a 105mm howitzer.
M14 SPAA	Self-propelled anti-aircraft		United States	Twin .50 mount on an M3 half-track
M10 "Wolverine"	Tank destroyer	WW2	United States	Modified Sherman hull with an open turret and 3in. gun
M10 17pdr	Tank destroyer	WW2	United States/United Kingdom	M10 equipped with a 17pdr gun
17pdr SP Archer	Tank destroyer	1944-Suez Crisis	United Kingdom	Built on a Valentine tank hull
Crusader AA Mk.I and Mk.III	Self-propelled anti-aircraft	1944-????	United Kingdom	Mk.I armed with a Bofors 40mm anti-aircraft gun, Mk.III armed with twin Oerlikon 20mm guns
Skink anti-aircraft tank	Self-propelled anti-aircraft	1944	Canada	Enclosed turret on a Grizzly tank hull. Armed with 4 Polsten guns. Introduced late in the war and only saw use as an anti-infantry weapon.
Carrier, SP, 4x4 40mm, AA (Bofors) 30cwt	Self-propelled anti-aircraft	1944-1945	United Kingdom	Morris Commercial four-wheel drive lorry armed with a Bofors 40 mm anti-aircraft gun.

=== Engineering vehicles ===
Model	Type	Service period	Origin	Details
Ram ARV	Armoured Recovery Vehicle		Canada
M4A4 Sherman V ARV	Armoured Recovery Vehicle		United States
Valentine Bridgelayer	AVLB		United Kingdom
M416 trailers		1940s-1990s	United States
M101 trailers		1992-?	United States

=== Artillery ===
==== Field artillery ====
Model	Type	Service period	Origin	Details
QF 25 pounder	howitzer/field gun		United Kingdom
BL 4.5 inch Medium Field Gun	field gun	WWII	United Kingdom
BL 5.5 inch Medium Gun	medium field gun	WWII	United Kingdom
Land Mattress	multiple rocket launcher	WWII	United Kingdom

==== Anti-tank guns ====
Model	Type	Service period	Origin	Details
Ordnance QF 6 pounder			United Kingdom
Ordnance QF 17 pounder			United Kingdom

==== Anti-aircraft guns ====
Model	Type	Service period	Origin	Details
Bofors 40 mm gun			Sweden
QF 3.75 inch AA			United Kingdom
Polsten-Oerlikon gun			Poland

== Cold War to modern (until 2017) ==
=== Infantry weapons ===
Model	Type	Service period	Origin	Details
C1 SMG	Submachine gun	1958-1988	United Kingdom; Canada	License produced Sterling SMG
FN C1 and FN C1A1	Battle rifle	1955-1987	Belgium; Canada	License produced by Canadian Arsenals Limited
FN C2 and C2A1 SAW	Squad Automatic Weapon	1955-1987	Belgium; Canada	C1 modified for SAW role
C3 and C3A1	Sniper rifle	1972-2003	United Kingdom	Modified Parker Hale M82
Heller anti-tank rocket	Anti-tank Rocket	1954-1967	Canada
Blowpipe surface-to-air missile	MANPADS	1980s-1991	United Kingdom
Javelin surface-to-air missile	MANPADS	1991-2005	United Kingdom
106mm recoilless rifle	Recoilless rifle	1950s-1988	United States	Retired from the Regular Force in 1976

=== Utility vehicles ===
Model	Type	Service period	Origin	Details
M151A2 Jeep	Light utility vehicle	1974-1984	United States	935 purchased and retired in the 1980s
M37	3/4 ton cargo truck	1951-1976	United States/Canada	4500 built by Chrysler/Dodge in Windsor 1951-1955
M38/M38A1 Jeep	Light utility vehicle	1950-1980s	United States/Canada	Built 1950-1952 and replaced by M151 for regular forces by 1974 and retired in the Reserves in 1980s
M135 GMC Deuce and a Half	2 1/2-ton 6x6 truck	1950-1980s	United States/Canada	Cargo truck and numerous variants replaced by MLVW
M54 (truck)	5 ton heavy truck	1950-1980s	United States/Canada	Cargo truck and numerous variants replaced by HLVW
M43 Ambulance	utility vehicle	1950s-?	United States/Canada	Variant of M37 built by Chrysler/Dodge in Windsor 1951-1955
M152	utility truck	1964-?	United States/Canada	Radio Command unit - 1038 produced by Chrysler in Windsor
M38A1CDN Jeep	Light utility vehicle	1952-1984	United States/Canada	Built by Ford of Canada
M38A1CDN2 Jeep	Light utility vehicle	1967-1984	United States/Canada	Built by Ford of Canada
M38A1CDN3 Jeep	Light utility vehicle	1970-1984	United States/Canada	Built by Ford of Canada
GM of Canada CUCV	Commercial utility Cargo vehicle	1976-2004	United States/Canada	2,848 1-1/4 ton replaced the M37 in 1976. More CUCV's were later ordered in the 1980s from GM Defense. Replaced by LSVW in regular army units then they were mostly used by the Army Reserve until replaced by the Milverado in 2004.
Jeep CJ	Light utility vehicle	1980's	United States/Canada	195 military CJ-7 versions put into service between the retirement of the M38A1 and the introduction of the Iltis
Iltis	Light utility vehicle	1984-2003	West Germany/Canada	Licensed produced version of the Volkswagen Iltis
G Wagon LUV(W)	Light utility vehicle	1996–present	West Germany	for more details see List of modern Canadian Army equipment
LSVW	Light Support Vehicle Wheeled	1993–present	Canada	for more details see List of modern Canadian Army equipment
Medium Logistic Vehicle Wheeled (MLVW)	Medium utility vehicle	1982–2019	Canada	for more details see List of modern Canadian Army equipment
Heavy Logistic Vehicle Wheeled (HLVW)	Heavy utility vehicle	1992–present	Canada	Licensed version of Steyr 1491 Percheron by Bombardier -for more details see List of modern Canadian Army equipment
BV 206	All terrain utility vehicle	1983–present	Sweden	for more details see List of modern Canadian Army equipment
Humvee M1113 and M1117	Light Utility Vehicle	~ 2010	United States	used by Canadian Special Operations Regiment and Joint Task Force 2 and since replaced by Jackal MWMIK

=== Armoured fighting vehicles ===
Model	Type	Service period	Origin	Details
M5A1 Stuart VI	Light tank	1946-1956	United States	90 purchased in 1946 and sold on to Portugal in 1956, three of which served with distinction in Angola from 1967 to 1972.
M24 Chaffee	Light tank	1946-1958	United States	32 were purchased in 1946 for armoured reconnaissance and retired in April 1958.
Sherman M4A2E8	Medium tank	1946-1970	United States	Kept in the reserves until 1970.
Sherman M4A3E8	Medium tank	1951-1954	United States	Acquired from US stocks for use during the Korean War.
Centurion Mk.3	Main Battle Tank	1952-1979	United Kingdom	Acquired to replace the Shermans with 84mm main gun.
Centurion Mk.5	Main Battle Tank with 105mm gun	1952-1979	United Kingdom	Canada Initially ordered 274 Mk 3 Tanks, plus 9 Armoured Recovery Vehicles and 4 Bridge-layers and additional orders followed. The Mk 5 (upgunned to 105 mm) were used later. From 1969 to 1970 the Canadian Army lists 77 tanks based in Germany (mostly Mk 5 and Mk 11's) and the remainder in Canada (60 at CFB Wainwright AB, 59 at CFSD Longpointe PQ, 46 at CFB Gagetown NB, 30 at CFB Borden, 29 at CFB Meaford ON, 27 at CFB Calgary AB, 12 at CFB Petawawa ON, 6 at RCEME School Kingston ON and 1 at the LETE Test Establishment Orleans, CFB Ottawa ON) for a total of 347 Tanks (including 120 Mk 5's, 3 Mk 5 Recovery tanks and some Mk 11's with IR and ranging guns fitted). Replaced by Leopard C1. Many of the tanks were sold to Israel which converted them to diesel. Some are still in use as variants.
Centurion Mk.11	Main Battle Tank	1952-1979	United Kingdom	with 105mm, IR and ranging gun
Leopard C1	Main Battle Tank	1978-2000	West Germany	127 Acquired to replace the Centurions. 114 of these 'Canadianized' Leopard 1A3 were used in active service.
Leopard C2	Main Battle Tank	2000–2017	West Germany	66 Leopard C1 upgraded and refitted with Leopard 1A5 turret. Retired in 2017 with 11 sent to museums and 45 designated as range targets. 3 were destroyed during service in Afghanistan and 15 damaged, 7 beyond repair and thus written off.
Leopard 2A6M CAN	Main Battle Tank	2007–Present	Germany	20 leopard 2s were loaned from Germany. Then Canada acquired 80 tanks from the Netherlands.
Lynx C&R	Command and Reconnaissance Vehicle	1968-1993	United States
M109A4+	Self-propelled artillery	1964-2005	United States	Replaced with towed M777 guns in 2007.
AVGP Cougar	Wheeled light armoured vehicle	1976–present	Canada	6x6 vehicle based on the MOWAG Piranha with a Scorpion tank turret.
AVGP Grizzly	Wheeled Armoured personnel carrier	1976–present	Canada	6x6 vehicle based on the MOWAG Piranha with a Cadillac-Gage 1 metre turret, designed to carry a section of infantry.
AVGP Husky	Wheeled Armoured recovery vehicle	1976–present	Canada	6x6 vehicle based on the MOWAG Piranha.
Ferret scout car	Wheeled reconnaissance vehicle	1954-1981	United Kingdom
Mamba	Wheeled Armoured personnel carrier	???? - 2012	South Africa	APC retired by 2012
M113	Tracked Armoured personnel carrier	mid 1960s - present	United States	Current in service variants: M113A3 Personnel carrier with Remote Weapon System (RWS), M113A3 Personnel carrier with One Metre Turret, M113A3 Mobile Repair Team, M577A3 Command Post, MTVL Basic Personnel Carrier / Light Re-supply, MTVC Heavy Re-supply, MTVE Engineer Vehicle, MTVF Fitter (Repair) Vehicle, MTVR Recovery Vehicle, TUA (TOW Under Armour)
Lynx	Tracked reconnaissance vehicle	1968 - 1993	United States
Coyote	Wheeled reconnaissance vehicle	1996–present	Canada
Bison	Wheeled Armoured personnel carrier	1990–present	Canada	Converted to supporting variants.
LAV III	Wheeled Infantry Fighting Vehicle	1999–present	Canada	can also be used as an Armoured personnel carrier
RG-31 Nyala	Infantry mobility vehicle	2006–present	South Africa	111 units delivered for use in Afghanistan

== Unsorted ==
=== Approved private purchase and secondary side-arms ===
Model	Type	Service period	Origin	Details
Webley Mark VI Revolver			British Empire
Enfield No 2 Revolver			British Empire
Colt Police Positive - 1941–present			United States
Colt Model 1911A1 - 1942-1945			United States

=== Bayonets and knives ===
Model	Type	Service period	Origin	Details
Pattern 1888 bayonet	Bayonet
Pattern 1907 bayonet	Bayonet
Pattern 1913 bayonet	Bayonet
Ross bayonet	Bayonet		Canada
No. 4 rifle bayonets	Bayonet
Mk I spike bayonet	Bayonet
Mk II spike bayonet	Bayonet
Mk III spike bayonet	Bayonet
No. 5 Mk II knife bayonet	Bayonet
No. 7 knife bayonet	Bayonet
No. 9 socket knife bayonet	Bayonet
C1 bayonet	Bayonet		Canada
Nella C7 bayonet	Bayonet	1984-2004	Canada
CAN bayonet 2000	Bayonet	2004-present	Canada
Fairbairn–Sykes fighting knife	Combat knife		United Kingdom
Grohmann #3 CAF knife	Combat knife	1967–present	Canada
C-5 pocket knife/ utility knife	Utility knife	1973-2004
Gerber multi-tool knife	Utility knife	2001–present	United States
V-42 stiletto	Combat knife	1942-1944	United States	Used by the 1st Special Service Force

=== Swords ===
- 1897 Pattern British Infantry Officer's Sword
- 1908 and 1912 Pattern British Army Cavalry Swords
- 1857 Artillery Officer Sword
- 1827 Navy Officer Sword
- 1926 Air Force Officer Sword

=== Uniforms, load-bearing and protective equipment ===
Uniforms

- Foreign Service Dress 1900-1903
- Service Dress 1903-1939
  - Canadian Pattern and British Pattern
- Khaki Drill
- Battle Dress 1939-1967
- Denison smock Used by the Airborne
- Canadian Para Smock
- Bush Dress
- Combat Dress 1968–2002
  - CADPAT camouflage Combat Dress 2002–present

Load-bearing equipment

- Oliver pattern equipment 1898–19??
- 1903 pattern bandolier equipment
- 1937 pattern web equipment
- 1942 Battle Jerkin
- 1951 pattern web equipment
- 1964 pattern web equipment
- 1982 pattern web equipment
- Tactical vest (Tac Vest) 2003–present

Head dress

- Canadian military fur wedge cap
- Glengarry
- Tam o'shanter
- Field Service Cap
- Beret
- Balmoral bonnet
- Brodie helmet
- Mk II helmet
- Mk III helmet
- M1 Helmet
- CG634

Protective equipment

- Fragmentation protection vest

== Ordnance ==
=== Ammunition ===
Model	Type	Service period	Origin	Details
.280 Ross		1914-1918	Canada	Limited Commonwealth use as a sniper's cartridge
.303 British			United Kingdom	No longer in service
.455 Webley			United Kingdom	No longer in service
7.62 × 51 mm NATO			United States
5.56×45mm NATO		1984–present	Belgium
9×19mm Parabellum		1944–present	Austria-Hungary
.50 BMG			United States	Used by Canadian snipers to set the longest distance kill record
12 Gauge			United States
5.7×28 mm			Belgium	only in use by Canadian Special Forces
.338 Lapua Magnum		2005–present	Finland

=== Grenades, mines and other explosives ===
Model	Type	Service period	Origin	Details
Mills bomb			United Kingdom
No 68 AT Grenade			United Kingdom
No 69 Bakelite Percussion Grenade			United Kingdom
No 73 Grenade			United Kingdom
No. 74 Sticky bomb			United Kingdom
No. 75 AT Hawkins Mine			United Kingdom
No. 82 Gammon			United Kingdom
Clam Magnetic Mine			United Kingdom
GS.MV Anti-tank Mine
GS.MkII Anti-tank Mine
M61 grenade			United States
M67 grenade			United States
C19 claymore			United States/Canada
V40 Mini-Grenade			Netherlands

=== Infantry mortars ===
Model	Type	Service period	Origin	Details
2 inch mortar		WWII	United Kingdom
3 inch mortar		WWII	United Kingdom
4.2 inch mortar		WWII
60 mm M19 CAN light mortar		WWII-present	United States
81 mm C3 medium mortar		1967–present	United Kingdom

== Present day ==
- List of equipment of the Canadian Army
