= ISSP =

ISSP can refer to:

- International Society of Sustainability Professionals (ISSP), non-profit professional association
- Integrated Single Specialty Provider, health care business model
- Integrated Soldier System Project, future soldier project in Canada
- International Social Survey Programme, a collaboration between different nations conducting surveys covering topics which are useful for social science research
- International Society of Sport Psychology
- Islamic State – Sahel Province or Islamic State – Somalia Province, branches of the Islamic State
- In-school suspension, an alternative setting that removes students from the classroom for a period of time, while requiring students to attend school and complete their work
- Institute for Science, Society and Policy, a multi-disciplinary unit at the University of Ottawa, Canada
- Inter-Solar System Police, a fictional police agency from the anime Cowboy Bebop
- In System Serial Programming, a microcontroller programming standard
- Information Society Service Providers under the EU Electronic Commerce Directive
- Information Systems Strategy Plan
- The Institute for Solid State Physics (ISSP), The University of Tokyo
