= ESTDCU =

Estonian version of the digital camouflage uniform

ESTDCC (Estonian Digital Camouflage Uniform)
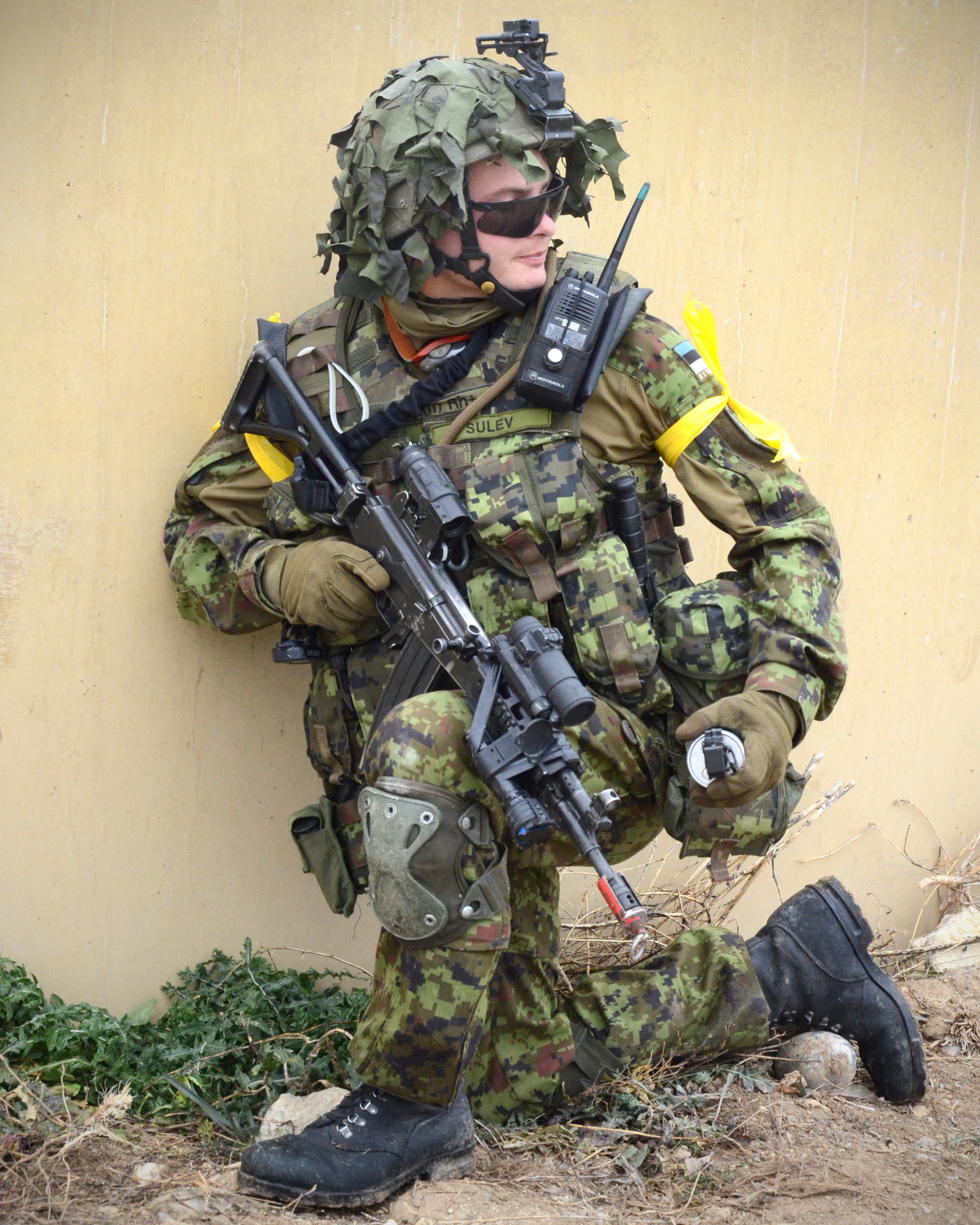
- An Estonian soldier with the ESTDCU Woodland uniform
- Type: Military camouflage pattern
- Place of origin: Estonia

Service history
- In service: 2007–present
- Wars: Iraq War; War in Afghanistan (2001-2021); Mali War

Production history
- Designer: Andres Lüll
- Designed: 2005
- Produced: 2006-present
- Variants: Woodland ESTDCU; Desert ESTDCU

The ESTDCU (ESTonian Digital Camo Uniform) is an Estonian digital camouflage pattern.

== History ==
The first set of test uniforms was introduced in 2005. The ESTDCU was adopted in the EDF by 2006.

== Design ==
The camouflage pattern was developed by Andres Lüll on contract with the Logistics Center of the Estonian Defence Forces.

The ESTDCU has an extreme likeness to Canadian military's CADPAT featuring black, olive green, and rust-colored pixels on a light green background.
