= HyperStealth Biotechnology Corporation =

- Type: Private
- Founded: 1999
- Headquarters: 21134 Maple Ridge Square, Maple Ridge, British Columbia, Canada
- Key people: Guy Cramer (chief executive officer & president)
- Website: www.hyperstealth.com

HyperStealth Biotechnology Corporation is a Canadian manufacturer of military camouflage uniforms. It was founded in 1999 in Maple Ridge, British Columbia near Vancouver by Guy Cramer.

As of 2017, it has made camouflages for the armies of Jordan, Chile, the United Arab Emirates and Afghanistan. According to The New York Times, the United States government spent $28 million more on their uniforms for the Afghan National Army between 2007 and 2017 than they could have with another camouflage pattern. They also have a patent pending to use the Quantum Stealth (Invisibility Cloak) claiming to amplify output of solar panels.

HyperStealth has also been featured around the world in the news, science articles, magazines, TV news and interviews, and YouTube.
