= CT-1 parachute =

Personnel parachute used by the Canadian Army

The CT-1 parachute is a personnel parachute deployed by the Canadian Army during the latter half of the 20th century. The CT-1 was a tweak of the T-10 parachute for Canadian purposes, and its profile while deployed is similar to the American model.
