= Integrated Soldier System Project =

Canada's program to equip dismounted soldiers with state-of-the-art equipment

The Integrated Soldier System Project (ISSP) is Canada's program to equip dismounted soldiers with state-of-the-art equipment, using a combination of commercial, off-the-shelf technologies (COTS) and current-issue military gear. The equipment is designed to improve command execution, target acquisition and situational awareness by:

- Providing communications, command and control at the soldier level
- Integrating small arms with high-tech equipment
- Promoting a view of the individual soldier as a system rather than as a segment of a larger force
- Providing different variants for low level commanders, assaulters and supporters

== Background ==
Canada's desire for a Soldier System dates back to November 1988 and closely follows efforts in many NATO countries. The first research effort, called Integrated Protective Clothing and Equipment (IPCE), was initiated in 1995, but then was cancelled due to its high cost and its failure to meet the majority of requirements. Ongoing operations in the mid 1990s led to the creation of the Clothe the Soldier (CTS) Project, which directly addressed the NATO Soldier System Capability areas of Survivability and Sustainability. The Canadian Disruptive Pattern was implemented during the Clothe Soldier Project (CTS).

=== Integrated Soldier System Project ===
The Integrated Soldier System Project (ISSP) is intended to provide an integrated suite of equipment that may include weapons and electronic devices. The $310 million project program will provide the Canadian Army with new equipment, not only to allow troops to track each other as they move throughout the battlefield, but to feed communication and targeting information to their Battle Management Command, Control, Communications, Computers and Intelligence (BMC4I) systems. The project is expected to unfold over the next ten years. The Department of National Defence confirmed that approximately 17,000 integrated soldier systems would be bought by 2011. The ISSP will address the remaining NATO Soldier System capabilities of Lethality, Mobility and Survivability, while balancing the baseline needs.

=== Small Arms Replacement Project ===
In October 2007, the Department of National Defence approved the Small Arms Replacement Project II (SARP II), which will deliver integrated, direct fire, multi-effect, portable anti-personnel and anti-material capability through weapons, munitions, fire control systems, training systems and logistic support. The cost for SARP II exceeds $1 Billion for the 2012-2022 period.
