= CADPAT =

Computer-generated digital camouflage pattern used by the Canadian Armed Forces

Canadian Disruptive Pattern
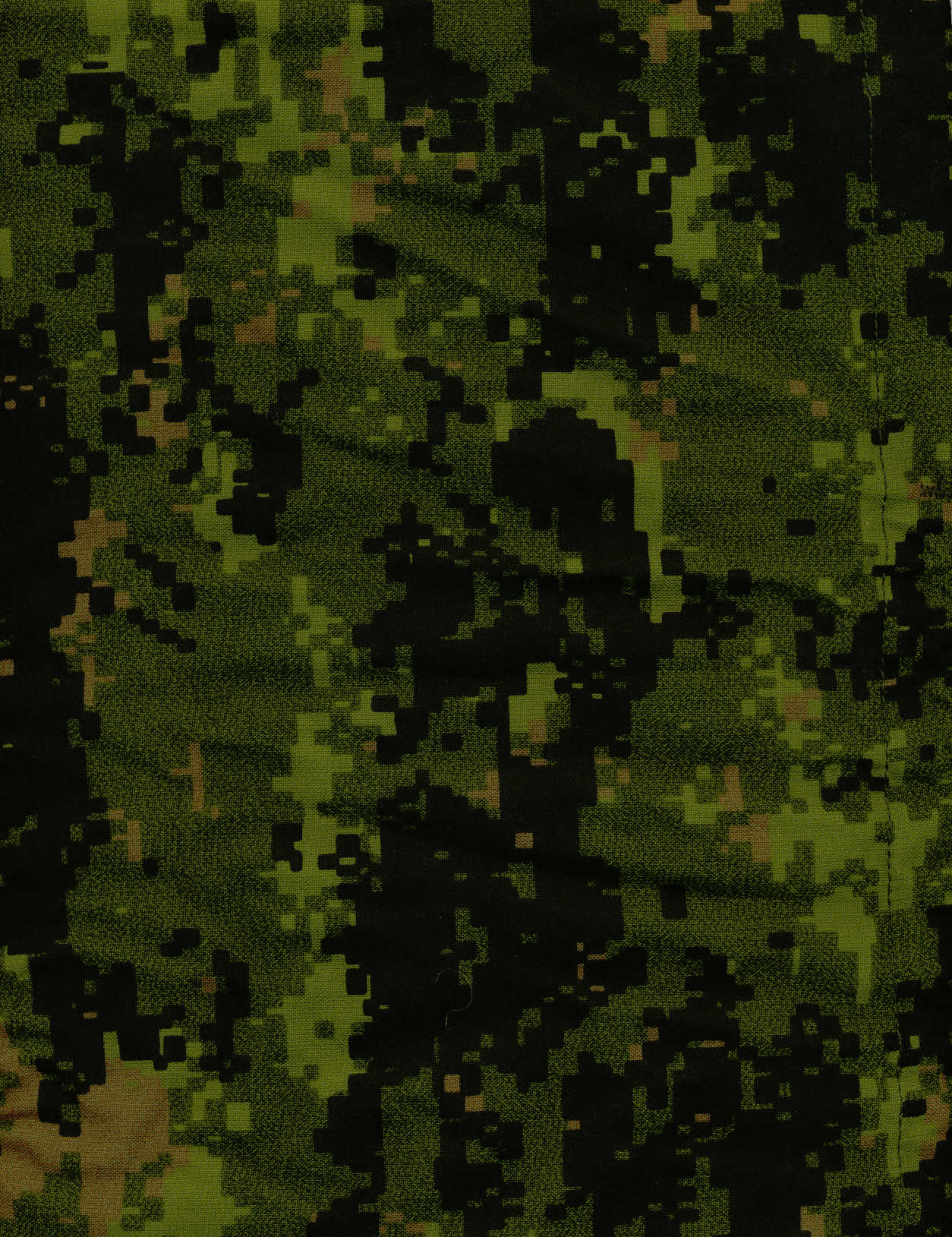
- CADPAT temperate woodland pattern
- Type: Military camouflage pattern
- Place of origin: Canada

Service history
- In service: 1997–present
- Used by: Canadian Armed Forces
- Wars: War in Afghanistan

Production history
- Produced: 1995–present
- Variants: CADPAT Temperate Woodland (TW); CADPAT Arid Regions (AR); CADPAT Winter Operations (WO); CADPAT Multi-Terrain (MT)

The Canadian Disruptive Pattern (CADPAT; French: dessin de camouflage canadien, DcamC) is the computer-generated digital camouflage pattern developed for use by the Canadian Armed Forces (CAF). Four operational variations of CADPAT have been used by the CAF: a temperate woodland pattern, an arid regions pattern, a winter operations pattern, and a multi-terrain pattern.

CADPAT was the first digital camouflage pattern to be adopted for operational use, with its temperate woodland pattern first issued to the CAF in 1997. The pattern was fully standardized across the Forces by 2002, replacing the olive-drab operational uniforms previously worn. Additional variants, including arid region and winter operation patterns, were later issued, with work on the former accelerated by the War in Afghanistan. The temperate woodland and arid region patterns were phased out in favour of the multi-terrain pattern in the mid-2020s.

== History ==
Canada's desire for a new soldier system dated back to November 1988 and closely followed efforts in many NATO countries. The first research effort, called Integrated Protective Clothing and Equipment (IPCE) Technology Demonstration, was initiated in 1995 but then was cancelled, due to high systems cost and failure to meet the majority of the requirements. Ongoing operations in the mid-1990s led to the creation of the Clothe the Soldier (CTS) Project, which directly addressed the NATO soldier system capability areas of survivability and sustainability. The Canadian Disruptive Pattern was a part of ongoing research and implemented during the CTS Project.

Once CADPAT temperate woodland was finalized, field tests began in 1995. After satisfactory results, CADPAT was adopted by Land Force Command in 1997; however, testing was not concluded until 2001 once the pattern was trademarked.

The first operational use of the temperate woodland pattern was reported in September 2001 with Canadian soldiers serving in Bosnia and Herzegovina for Palladium Rotation 09. The first operational use of the CADPAT arid regions variant overseas was reported during the War in Afghanistan, when Taliban prisoners of war were seen escorted by armed Canadian commandos in the camo. This nearly made things complicated for the Department of National Defence (DND), since it had said that no Canadian commandos were officially in Afghanistan.

In 2019, tests were conducted for plans to eventually replace the temperate and arid regions patterns. The 3rd Battalion of the Royal Canadian Regiment (3RCR) in Garrison Petawawa were issued the pattern for field tests.

Under the Soldier Operational Clothing and Equipment Modernization (SOCEM) project, DND sought feedback and advice from users for the trial camouflage known as Prototype J before it made its decision. In 2021, the new multi-terrain CADPAT was selected as the replacement. In 2021, the first orders for the MT pattern were made, with 390,000 metres of cloth, followed by 560,000 metres of cloth. The new camouflage pattern is expected to be fully adopted by 2027.

== Pattern variations ==
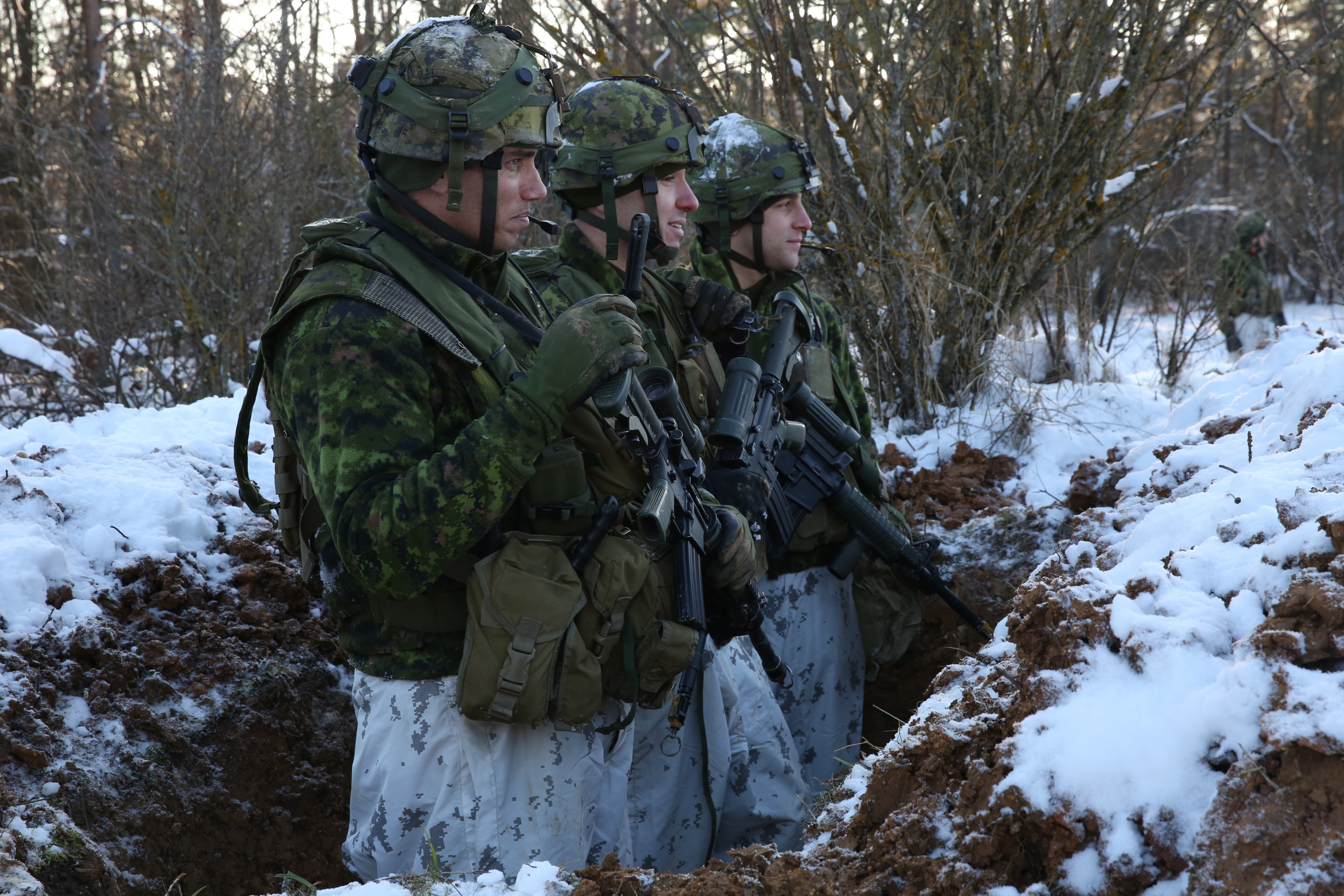
Royal 22^{e} Régiment soldiers equipped with CADPAT TW and CADPAT WO variations.

The Canadian Armed Forces has developed four operational variations of CADPAT: temperate woodland (TW), arid regions (AR), winter operations (WO), and multi-terrain (MT).

The temperate woodland pattern became the standard issue for Land Force Command in 2002, with the Air Command following suit in 2004. In 2021, the CAF selected a new CADPAT variant, multi-terrain pattern, to replace the TW and AR patterns, with both being phased out over the coming years, and the MT-patterned uniform becoming the "daily wear" uniform.

=== Temperate woodland ===
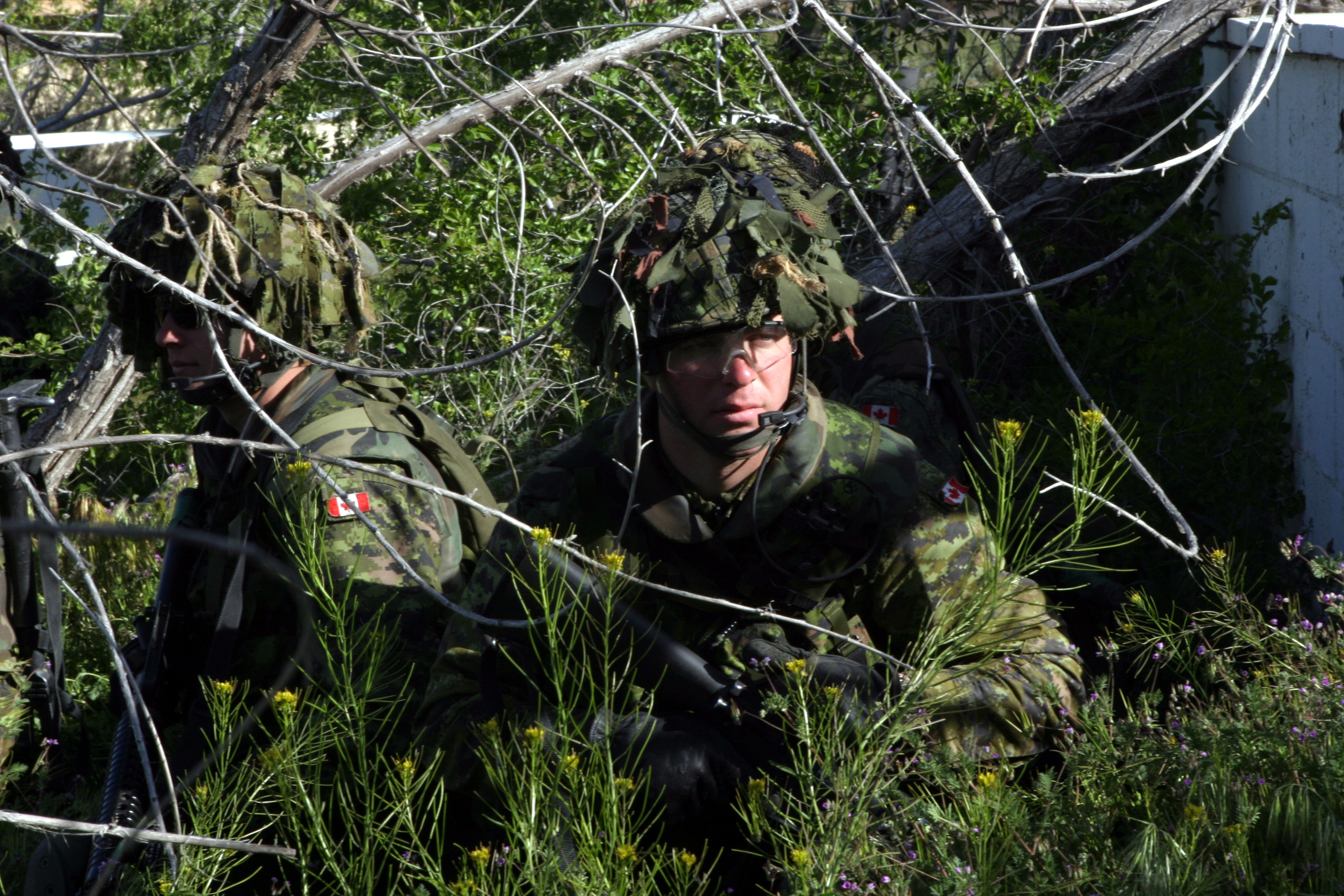
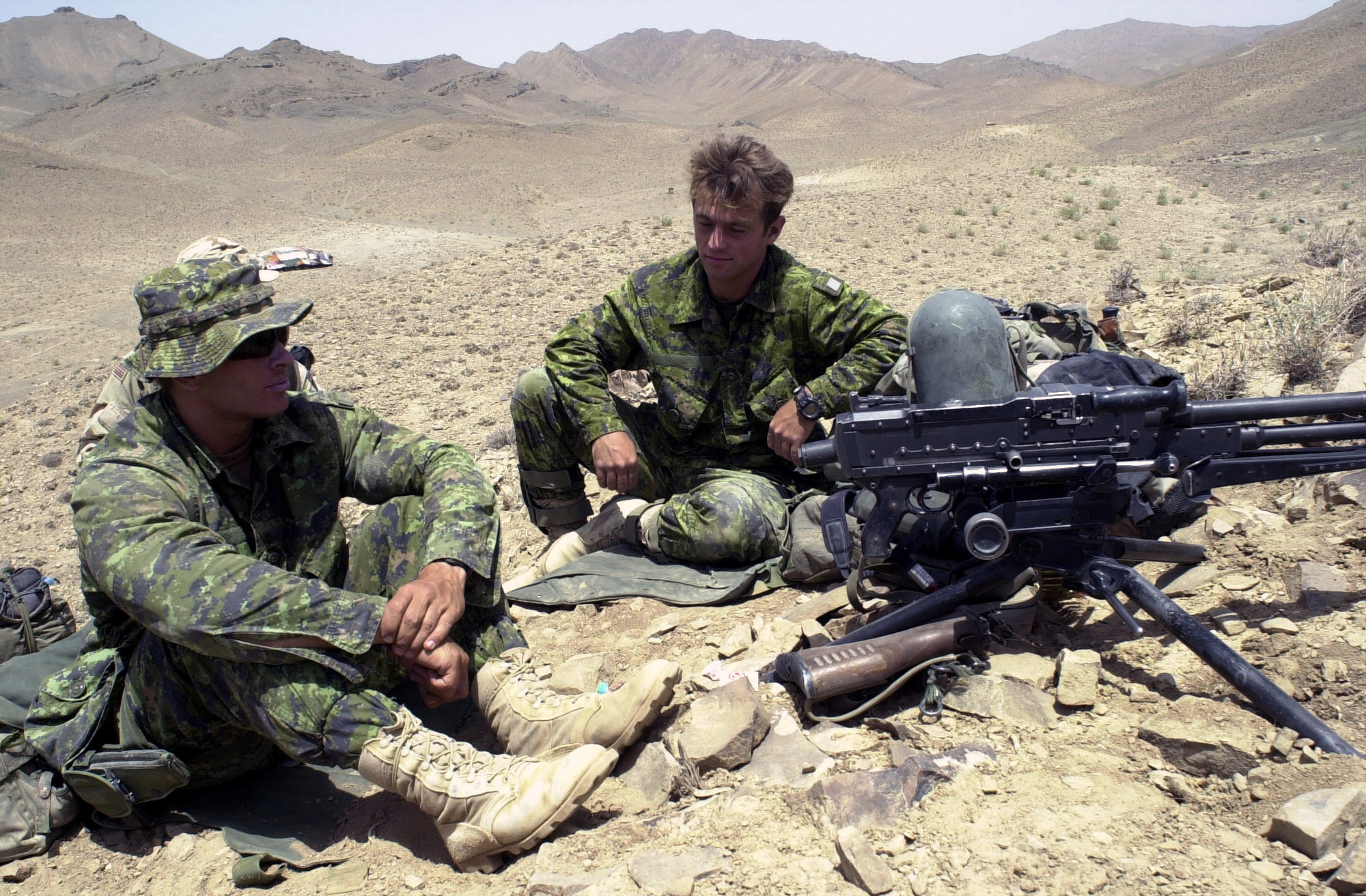
Members of Princess Patricia's Canadian Light Infantry in CADPAT TW operational dress

The temperate woodland pattern (TW) is designed for use in forest and grassland environments, with its mix of light green, dark green, brown, and black. The pattern was first introduced in 1996 on the helmet cover for the new CG634 helmet then coming into service. At the same time, the pattern was also introduced on a new soldier's individual camouflage net. The TW pattern provides protection from observation by the naked eye and night vision devices, with the pattern incorporating near-infrared technology at the ink level to help conceal the wearer against near-infrared optical devices.

The pattern is optimized for a gate range of 30 to 350 metres against a three-power optical sight.

=== Arid regions ===
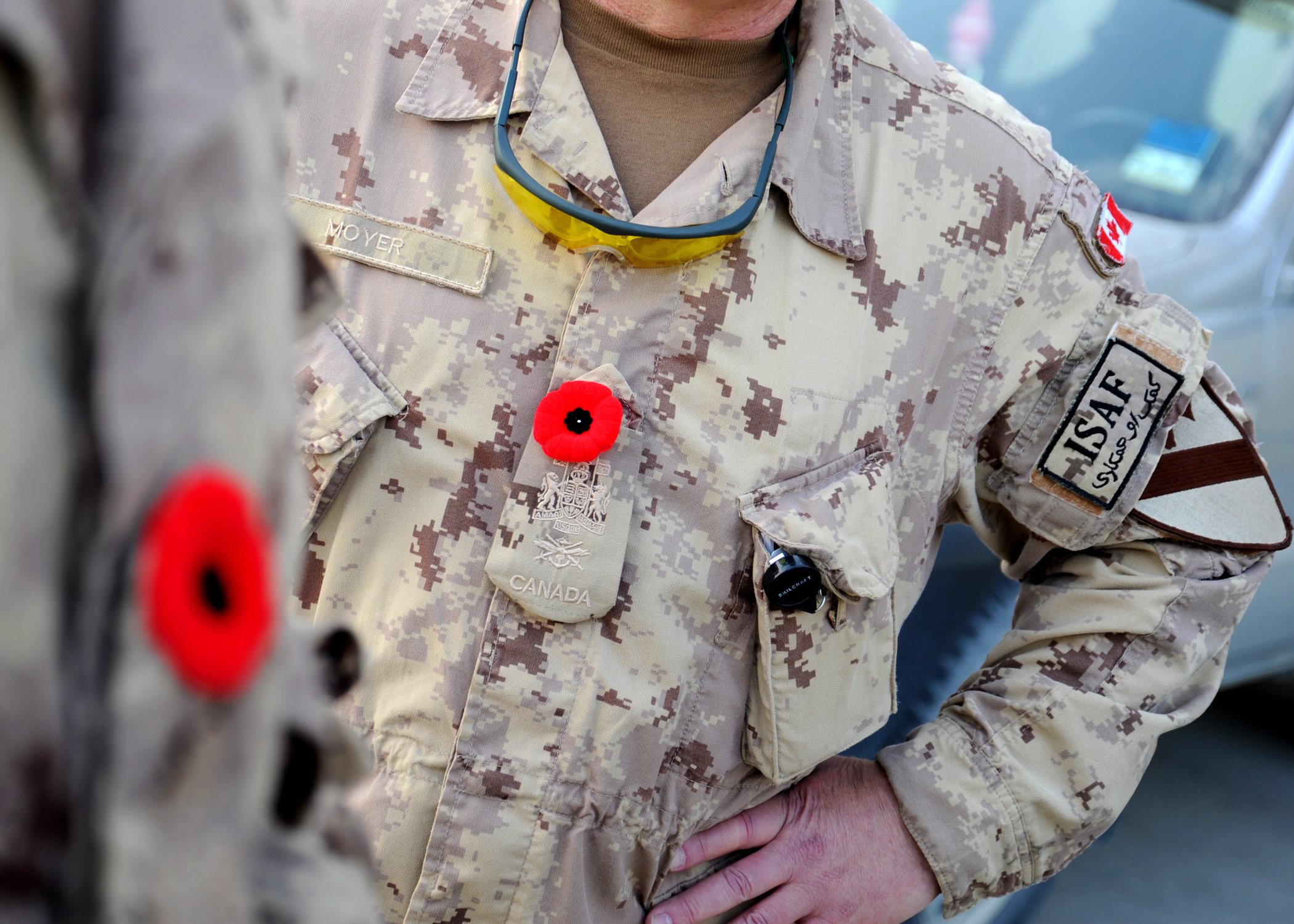
Close up of the CADPAT AR pattern

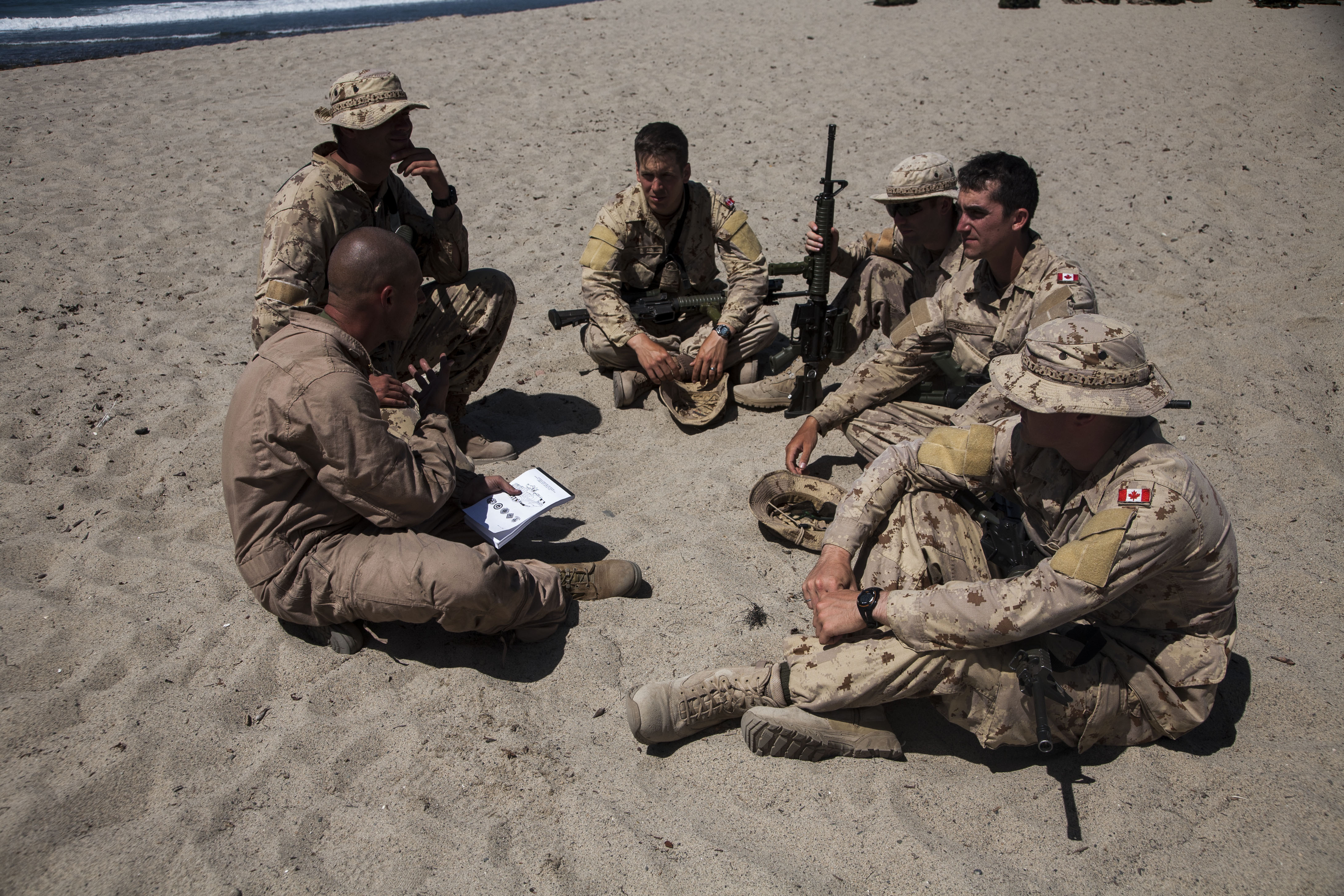
Canadian soldiers in CADPAT AR operational dress

The arid regions pattern (AR) is designed for use in desert, near desert, and savannah conditions, incorporating three shades of brown. The AR pattern also features two additional arm pockets and Velcro on the arms compared to the older TW uniform. The AR pattern was developed concurrently with the trials of TW pattern.

After Canadian Forces were deployed to Afghanistan, the AR pattern was expedited with the intent that it would be issued to soldiers in summer 2002. The AR pattern also incorporates infrared technology for night operation.

=== Winter operations ===
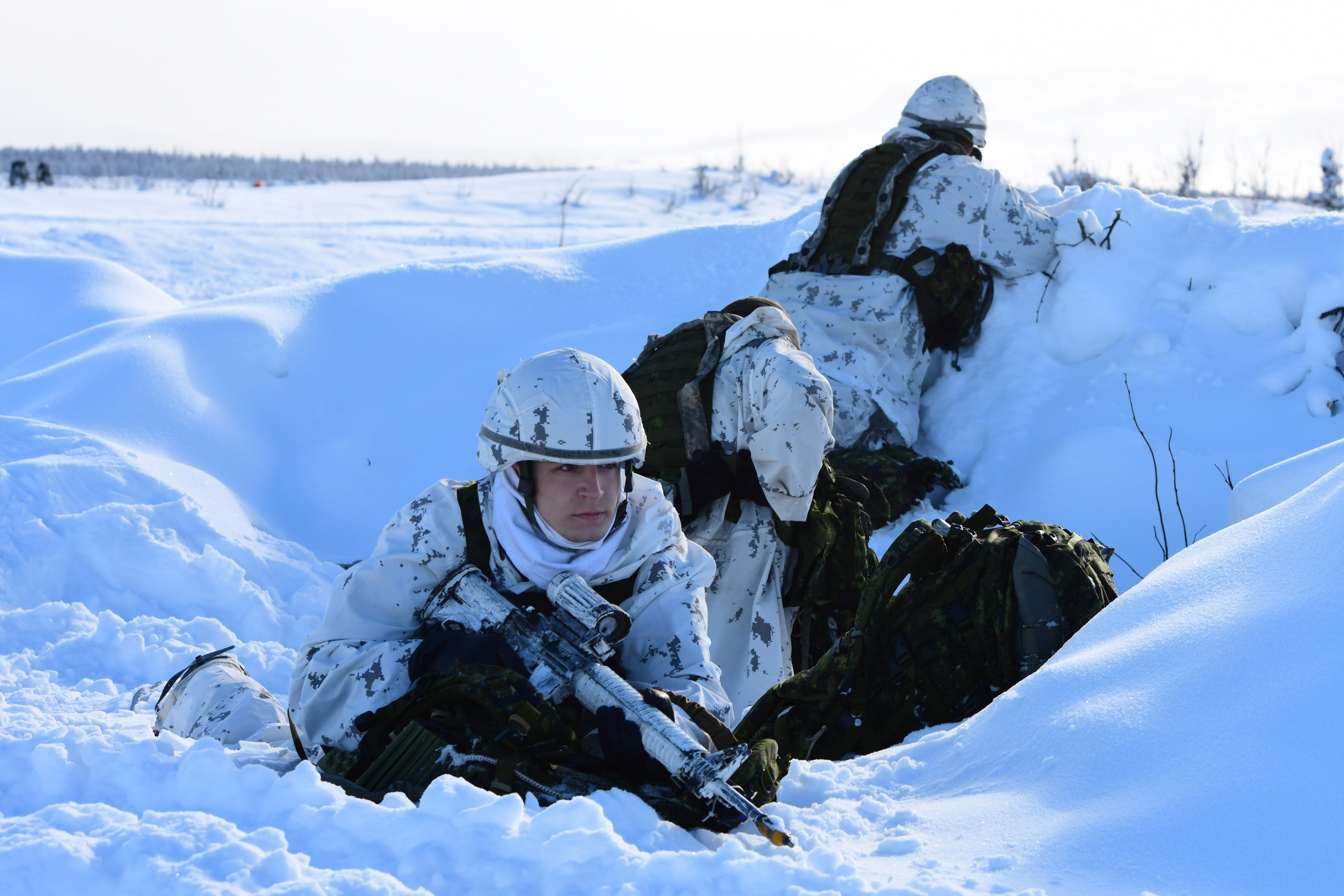
Canadian paratroopers dressed in CADPAT WO set up a defensive perimeter

The winter operations (WO) pattern was created for snow-covered or mixed woodland and snowy terrain. The snow camouflage pattern was introduced as an upgrade to the monochrome winter whites to further enhance the Canadian soldier's camouflage capability by day and night. It also includes near-infrared technology.

=== Multi-terrain ===
Beginning in 2019, as part of the Soldier Operational Clothing and Equipment Modernization (SOCEM) programme, a transitional pattern began to be tested by the CAF. The pattern was accepted after some mild alterations to its colouration. The pattern is medium-brown dominant, accented by black, dark green, and light tan; overall it is less vibrant than the TW pattern, but darker than the AR pattern.

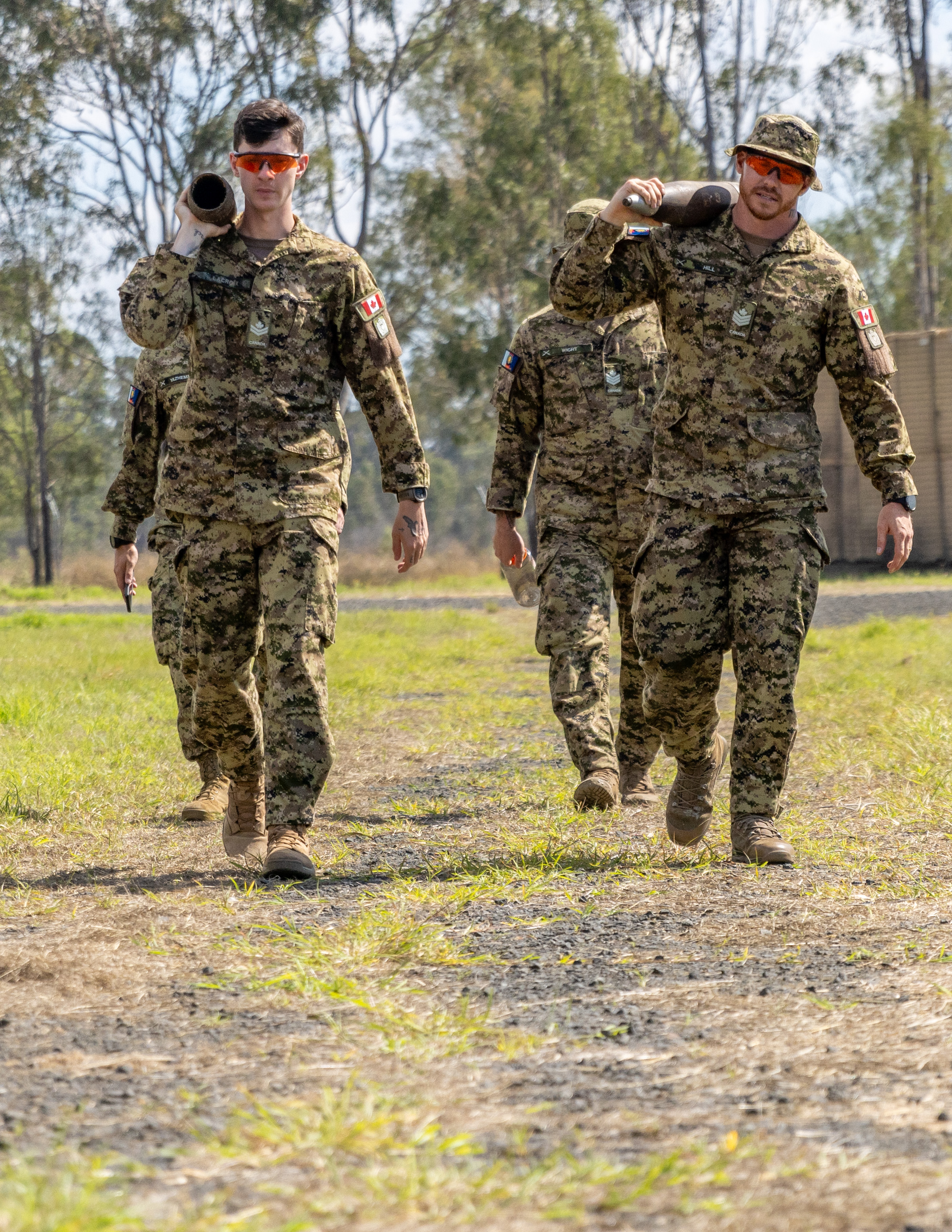
Canadian soldiers equipped with CADPAT MT camouflage

In 2021, the new CADPAT pattern, called "multi-terrain pattern" or simply “MT,” was announced as the replacement the TW and AR patterns.

The MT pattern is designed to blend into the wide range of environments, and is planned to serve as the day-to-day working uniform of the CAF. In 2024, the Canadian Forces announced that issuance of MT-patterned uniforms would begin in February 2024 for high-readiness units first; They also claimed that the transition to the new pattern would be complete by 2026.

=== Proposed variations ===
In 2011, Defence Research and Development Canada, based at CFB Suffield, set forth a requirement to develop a new urban pattern for the Canadian Forces based on the three major metropolitan areas of Canada: Toronto, Vancouver, and Montreal. The prototype pattern is known as the Canadian urban environment pattern (CUEPAT). While at least one company – HyperStealth Biotechnology Corporation – responded to the requirement, there were no further announcements regarding CUEPAT.

During the trials that eventually led to the multi-terrain pattern, a number of patterns emerged as contenders, most prominent of which was known as the 'Prototype J' pattern. It underwent testing in 2019 and the pattern was slightly more green-dominant than the ultimately adopted MT pattern.

== Similar designs ==
CADPAT was the first digital camouflage pattern to be issued operationally.

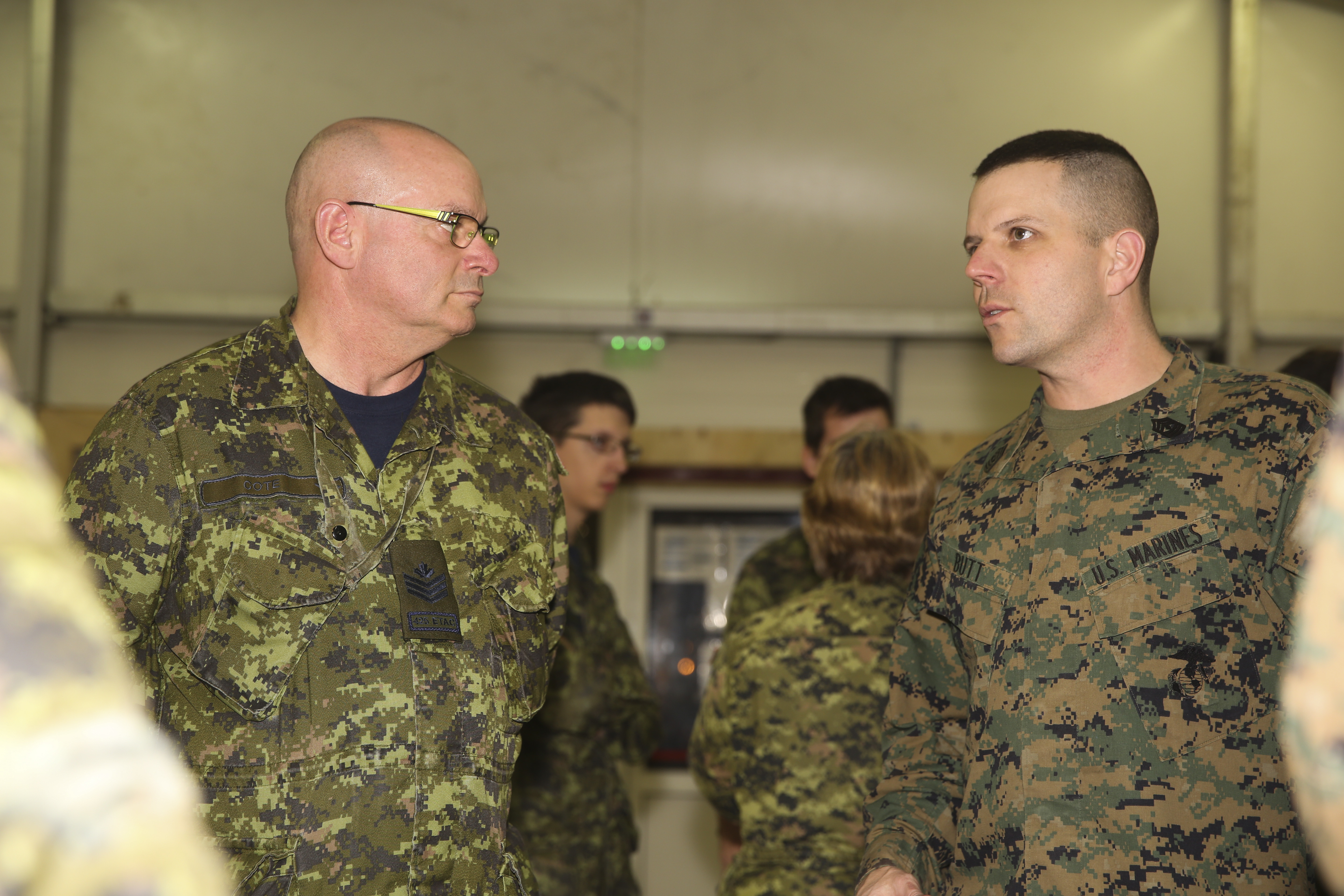
A Canadian airman in CADPAT TW (left); a U.S. marine dressed in MARPAT

The pattern was the direct inspiration for the United States Marine Corps' pursuit and adoption of their own camouflage pattern MARPAT when replacing their Battle Dress Uniform and Desert Camouflage Uniform in 2001: MARPAT uses the same print screens as the CADPAT TW pattern and the trial pattern for the CADPAT AR pattern.

The Estonian ESTDCU, adopted by the Estonian Defence Forces in 2006, shares similarities with the temperate woodland variant of CADPAT. This resemblance stems from the comparable forested environments of Canada and Estonia, influencing the ESTDCU's design choices.

The Finnish M05 camouflage pattern, adopted by the Finnish Defence Forces in 2007, also shares a similar design to CADPAT TW.

== See also ==
- List of military clothing camouflage patterns
- Uniforms of the Canadian Armed Forces
