= CG634 =

Combat helmet of the Canadian Armed Forces

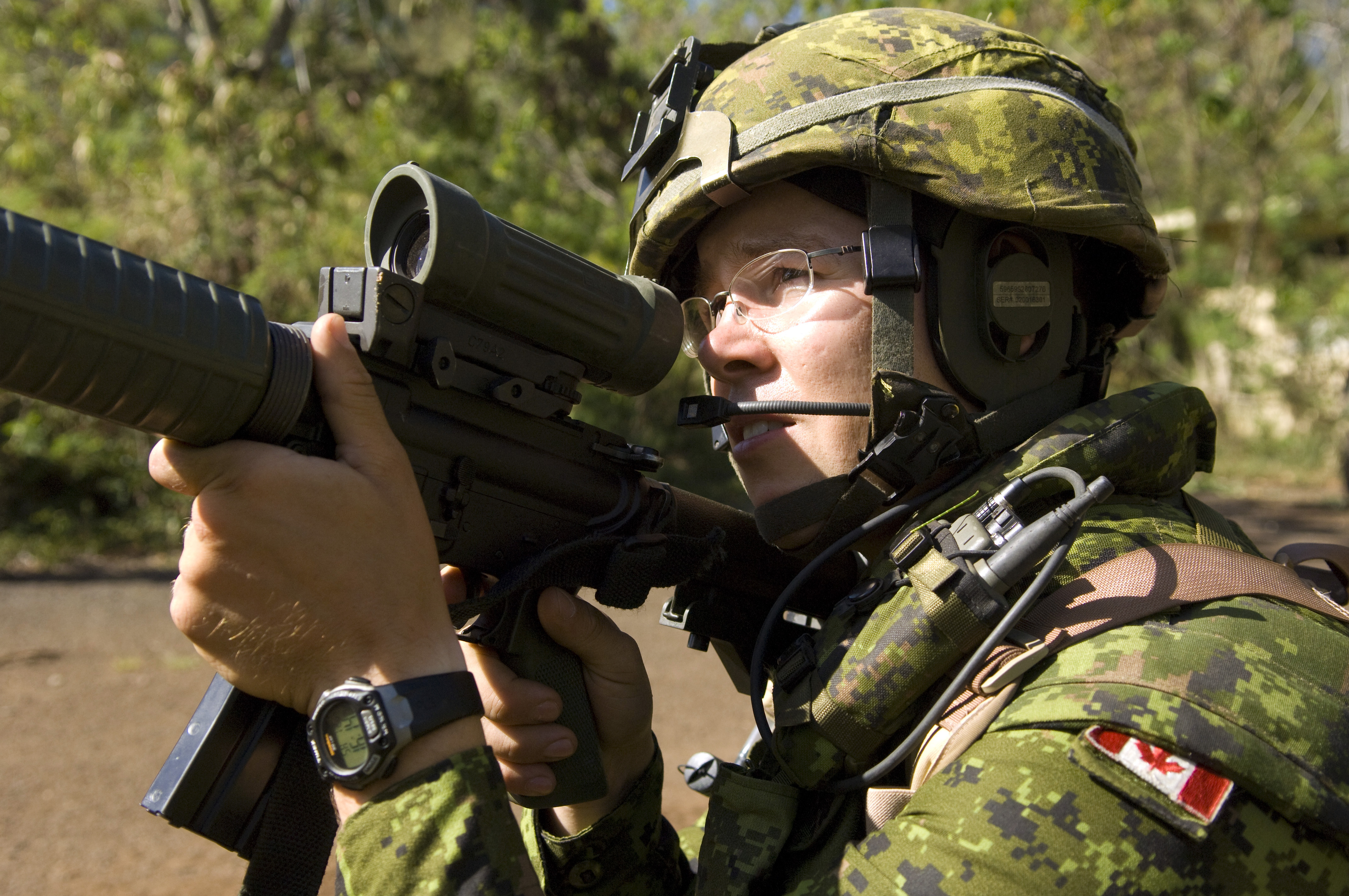
- A Canadian soldier wearing a CG634 helmet
- Type: Combat helmet
- Place of origin: Canada

Service history
- In service: 1997-Present
- Used by: Canada; Ukraine
- Wars: Kosovo War; International Force for East Timor; War in Afghanistan; First Libyan Civil War; Iraqi Civil War; Military intervention against the Islamic State of Iraq and the Levant; Red Sea crisis Russo-Ukrainian war

Production history
- Designed: 1996
- Manufacturer: CGF Gallet 1997-2002; Mine Safety Appliances 2007-2012; Revision Military Inc 2012 and refurbished helmets 2015-2020
- Produced: 1997-2020
- Variants: CG634 with minor improvements 2007-2020; CG634 Gen ll/CM735 2015-2022; CVCMH (made using modified CG634 helmet shells)

The CG634 is the main combat helmet of the Canadian Armed Forces. It was introduced in 1997 and is based on the French Gallet F2 helmet. The helmet has protection equal to an NIJ Level 3a rating, being able to stop a shot from a .357 Magnum.

== History ==
The Canadian military sought a replacement for the steel M1 helmet in the 1980s. In 1984 it trialled the British Mk. 6, the American PASGT and the Israeli OR402 composite helmets to determine the best characteristics of form, fit and ballistic protection. A concept design was developed and the Barrday Co. of Cambridge, Ontario, received a contract to produce over 2,000 Spectra helmets between 1988 and 1990 for ballistic, engineering and user trials. While the Barrday helmet performed well ballistically, field trials identified significant shortcomings.

The Barrday contract was scrapped and the search for a new helmet resumed in late 1992. After testing a number of European off-the-shelf designs the process was completed in May 1996 and a contract to produce 60,000 helmets was issued to the French company Gallet, which produced the F2 helmet and its variants for the French, Danish and Austrian armies. From 1997 to 2004 the CG634 was manufactured by Gallet Sécurité Internationale Inc in Saint-Romuald, Quebec. Subsequent contracts were placed with MSA, which bought Gallet in 2002.

Revision Military Inc (now rebranded as Galvion Inc as of 2019 as they sold the eyewear branch along with the name) purchased the MSA Gallet factory that produced CG634 helmets from Mine Safety Appliances in 2012. They were awarded contracts to produce replacement parts and refurbish CG634 helmet shells during 2015–2020.

== Design ==
The CG634 is made of aramid (Kevlar) and has a minimum v_{50} of 634 m/s (compared to the PASGT's 610 m/s). It mates a modified French design, based on the PASGT, but adapted for compatibility with Canadian equipment (head-set, respirator, vision devices and Fragmentation Vests). The suspension system combines a thick foam trauma liner with a rubber and nylon webbing suspension based on the suspension system of the French F2 helmet. The CG634 has a three-point chinstrap with flip-down adjustment pieces. The CG634 was produced in 3 colours: green, black, and orange.

The CG634 has a somewhat similar shape to and is sometimes mistaken for the later United States Army's MICH TC-2000 Combat Helmet.

== Accessories ==
Helmet Cover

- CADPAT Temperate Woodland: Adopted in 1997.
- CADPAT Arid Regions: Adopted in 2002 after the TW pattern was found to be ineffective in arid environments.
- CADPAT Winter Operations: A white helmet cover with grey CADPAT.
- CADPAT Multi Terrain
- CADPAT Prototype Pattern J: Trialled but not adopted.
- Arctic White: A white helmet cover used in the winter and/or arctic regions.
- UN Blue: Some have no markings while others have the UN logo and or UN on the sides.
- Naval Black/Naval Operations

Scrim Net

A black scrim net can be worn so that artificial and organic foliage can be added to the helmet in order to blend in with the natural environment and break up the shape of the helmet shell.

Camouflage Helmet Band

A Camouflage Band can be added to hold miscellaneous foliage to the helmet such as sticks.

Night Vision Equipment

When necessary, a night vision goggle mount is issued. The mount consists of a green metal bracket that hooks over the front of the helmet and the mount, which is screwed into it. There is a strap that loops through the mount and connects to a large ring, which is usually on the top of the helmet and two more straps secure the mount to the back of the helmet. The mount is compatible with AN/PVS-7 and AN/PVS-14 night vision systems.

C400 Ballistic Visor

The C400 Ballistic Visor can be worn with the CG634 for additional fragmentation protection.

== Replacement ==
The CG634 is scheduled to be replaced with the new CM735 combat helmet from Morgan Advanced Materials, which is based on their full-cut LASA AC914 for combat operations and the high-cut LASA AC915 for special operations. As of 2019 NP Aerospace was due to supply the helmet over seven years.

== CM735 ==
CM735
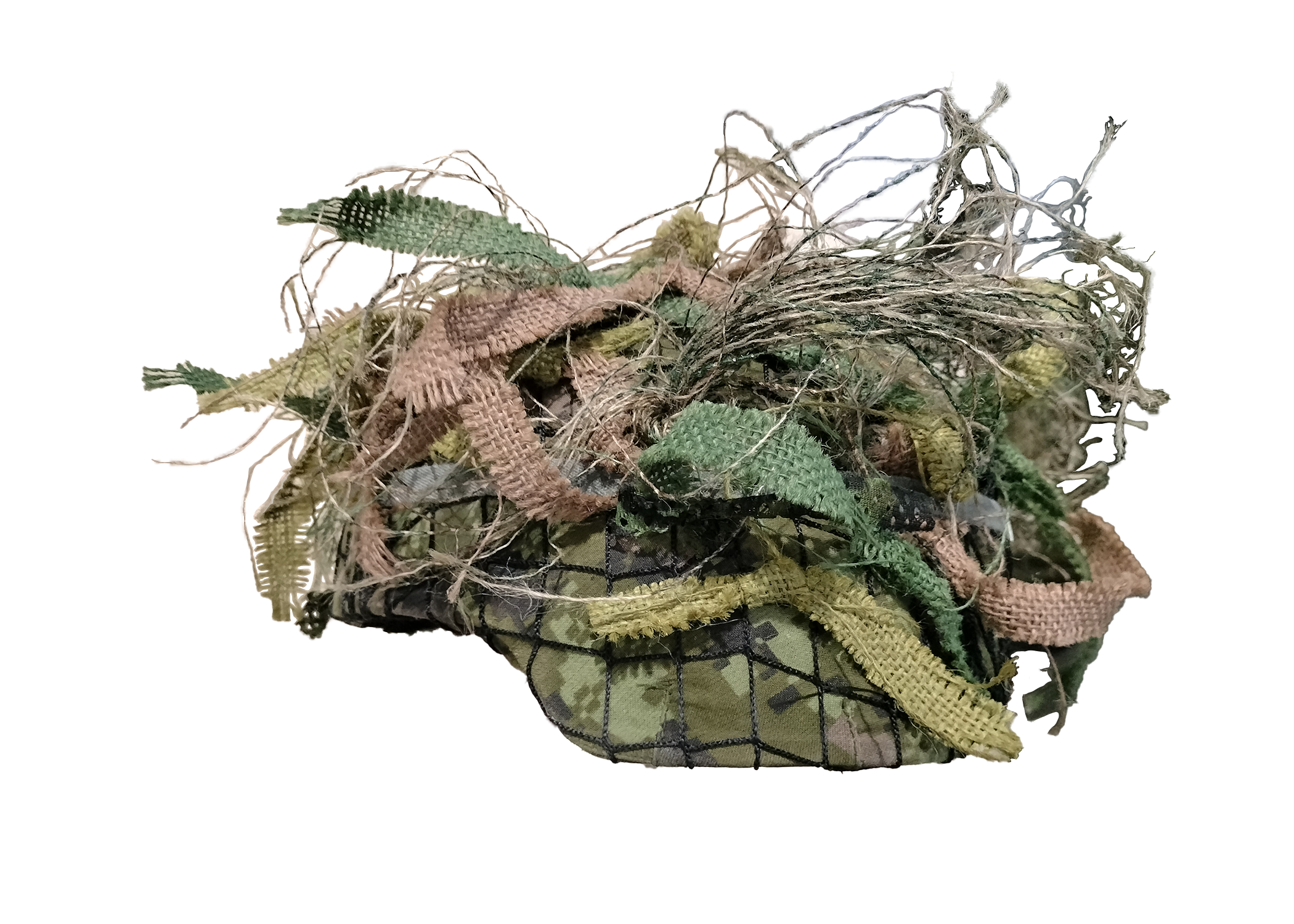
- A CM735 helmet
- Type: Combat helmet
- Place of origin: Canada

Service history
- In service: 2016-Present

Production history
- Manufacturer: Morgan Advanced Materials 2015-2018; NP Aerospace 2018-2022
- Produced: 2015-2022

In 2014 the Canadian military sought an interim replacement for the CG634 that would be the same shape as the CG634 helmet (minus the visor/lip), have interchangeable parts, and be lighter and have more ballistic resistance than the CG634. Morgan Advanced Materials won the contract for the Second Generation CG634 helmets after the LASA AC914 helmet designed using DSM Dyneema's UHMWPE ballistic fibre went through trials and was accepted. The CM735 helmet entered production in 2015 and began to be issued in 2016.

In 2019 NP Aerospace (formerly a part of Morgan Advanced Materials as NP Aerospace Ltd) was awarded a contract to produce CM735 helmets over 7 years, however helmet production has ended as of 2022.

Beginning in 2023 after trials in 2022, the Batlskin Caiman helmet under the designation Helmet High Cut Ground Troop's from Galvion Inc. is being issued in limited quantities to some units to replace CG634 and CM735 helmets as part of the Dismounted Infantry Capability Enhancement program.

The most noticeable difference between the CG634 and CM735 helmet is the lack of a visor/lip on the front of the CM735.

== Users ==
- Canada
- Ukraine: Donations made from Canada.
