= Colt Canada C19 =

- Type: Bolt action rifle
- Place of origin: Canada

Service history
- In service: 2018
- Used by: Canada

Production history
- Designer: SAKO
- Manufacturer: Colt Canada
- Unit cost: CA$4,824
- Produced: 2016–2018
- No. built: 6,800

Specifications
- Mass: 4.0 kg (8.8 lb)
- Length: 102.0 cm (40.2 in)
- Barrel length: 51.0 cm (20.1 in)
- Cartridge: 7.62×51mm NATO.308 Winchester
- Action: Bolt action; two locking lug T3
- Rate of fire: 30 rounds/min
- Muzzle velocity: 790 m/s (2,600 ft/s)
- Effective firing range: 100–600 m (109–656 yd) sight adjustments
- Maximum firing range: 600 m (656 yd)
- Feed system: 10-round detachable box magazine
- Sights: Rear: rotating diopter drum; front: hooded post quick acquisition iron sights

The Colt Canada C19 is a licence-built, Finnish-designed Tikka T3 CTR bolt-action rifle modified for the Canadian Rangers. The C19 replaced the longer and heavier Lee-Enfield No. 4 Mk.1 .303" rifles which entered service with the Canadian Army in WWII and later, with the Canadian Rangers, when they were formed in 1947.

== History ==
After testing different submissions from rifle manufacturers, the C19 was selected as the winner of a Canadian military procurement program requesting a new bolt-action rifle with iron sights and a detachable 10-round box magazine and other requirements. The procurement program stipulated the rifles had to be produced by a Canadian manufacturer and could not be totally identical to commercial rifles. According to SAKO, production commenced in mid-2016, with rifle trials into 2017 and the full complement of 6,800 rifles was expected to be delivered by the end of 2019. The contract was for $32.8 million.

The rifles are mainly used for self-defence against large North American carnivores, including polar bears, and for personal survival as regional surveillance missions are often conducted for extended periods in remote areas, requiring the Rangers to hunt for food.

In May 2025, it was reported that the rifles could not withstand use in extreme arctic conditions, as evidenced by cracking in the wooden stocks due to moisture absorption. In addition, the lamination on the C19 wood stocks is peeling off, and the red wood dye from the stocks was leaching and staining the hands of users. Rangers were directed to treat the stocks with tung oil to seal the wood and protect against moisture. It is estimated that replacing the stocks will cost $10 million and take three years to complete. In July 2025, it's reported that a contract will be awarded this year for a three-year process from 2026 with new wood stocks. The new stocks will match the look of the original design, including the red/grey laminate wood colour scheme.

The Canadian Forces is also ordering synthetic stocks for other C19s rifles for use by regular force military members on firing ranges, at airfields and on the Royal Canadian Navy’s Arctic and Offshore Patrol Ships.

== Design details ==
To meet the requirements, the C19 has the following modifications from the original Tikka T3 CTR:

- Larger bolt handle and enlarged trigger guard to accommodate gloved hands
- Protected front and rear iron sights
- Laminated stock in a unique red colour with Ranger badge
- Two-stage trigger with three-position safety

Further, the rifles are expected to operate in temperatures ranging from −51 to 39 °C (−60 to 102 °F) with moderate to high humidity and be resistant to corrosion from long-term exposure to salt-laden air and water.

The receiver top has a NATO Accessory Rail for mounting accessories like aiming elements or optics. The free-floating, hammer-forged threaded barrel, receiver, bolt, bolt handle and other critical components are made of stainless steel. The buttstock is manufactured from plywood laminates. Such engineered woods are stronger and resist warping better than the conventional one-piece patterns, do not require lengthy maturing, and are cheaper. Further, the buttstock can be lengthened by adding spacers.

The 10-round double-stack detachable box magazines have a rubber protector added at the bottoms.

The Colt C19 is equipped with iron sights that consist of a rear sight element mounted on the rear receiver containing a rotary drum protected by sturdy "ears" and a semi-hooded front post mechanically adjustable for elevation with a screwdriver. The rear sight is mechanically adjustable for both windage, with a screwdriver, and elevation with a rotary drum featuring six apertures at different heights calibrated for 100–600 m (109–656 yd) in 100 m (109 yd) increments. The different rear aperture heights can be selected with gloved hands and are tuned to closely match the ballistic trajectory of the issued rifle–cartridge combination with a predefined projectile weight/type, muzzle velocity and air density. Rifle aperture sights for military combat or hunting arms like the C19 are not designed for maximal attainable precision like target aperture sights, as these must be usable under suboptimal field conditions. The issued iron sights can be supplemented with aiming optics mounted to the rail section on the top of the receiver. The Canadian Armed Forces have not issued a requirement for optical weapon sights for these rifles, thus the choice of whether and which aiming optics are desired will remain the preserve of individual Rangers.

The C19 is capable of chambering not only in-service 7.62×51mm NATO ammunition, such as the Ball C21 147-grain (9.5 g) and proprietary C180 designated hunting ammunition issued to the Canadian Rangers, but also commercially available .308 Winchester ammunition as the Canadian Rangers are allowed to use their issued rifles for private hunting. The C180 ammunition is assembled by General Dynamics Ordnance and Tactical Systems in Quebec by pairing Nosler Accubond 180 gr (11.7 g) hunting bullets usable for a wide variety of North American big game with Canadian Forces' match (sniper) brass cartridge cases. The C180 ammunition would be legally compliant for use as a last resort protection against polar bears on Svalbard, a Norwegian archipelago in the Arctic Ocean.

The C19 rifle is being supplied with a soft transport case, Pelican hard transport case, cleaning kit, sling, and trigger lock.

== Tikka T3x Arctic civilian version ==
In 2017 Tikka introduced the Tikka T3x Arctic model in their regular commercial line, which is the civilian version of the Colt C19. Tikka T3x Arctic rifles lack the crest of the Canadian Rangers depicted on the stocks of C-19 service rifles. They are also more orange in colour than the red of the service rifle. The T3x also comes with the commercial version bolt shroud and cocking piece, lacks the multi-position QD sling loops of the C-19. Rather being fitted with Uncle Mikes mounting studs on the underside.

The commercial Tikka T3x Arctic iron sight line was revised during production. The first generation had a round front post and six 100–600 m (109–656 yd) rear sight apertures, of which the 100 m (109 yd) setting was a larger diameter aperture aiding quick acquisition, and low light capability. The second generation has a squared (rectangular) front post and six 0–500 m (0–547 yd) rear sight apertures.
