= CAN bayonet 2000 =

- Type: Knife bayonet
- Place of origin: Germany

Service history
- In service: 2004–present
- Wars: War in Afghanistan; Iraq War; Syrian Civil War; War in Iraq (2013-2017)

Production history
- Designer: AES
- Designed: 2001
- Manufacturer: Eickhorn-Solingen GmbH

Specifications
- Length: 311 mm (12.2 in)
- Blade length: 184 mm (7.2 in)
- Blade type: Clip Point

The CAN bayonet 2000/2005 is the up-to-date standard multi-purpose infantry bayonet of the Canadian Armed Forces, issued to match the C7/C8 service rifles.

== History ==
The bayonet 2000 was originally developed based on a NATO standardization agreement by AES in Germany as the successor of C7 Nella bayonet.

The bayonet 2000 was first selected by United States Marine Corps in 2001, but was rejected due to political issues, which eventually became the lead-up to AES going bankrupt.

After the bankruptcy of AES, the bayonet was rebranded to Bayonet 2005 by Eickhorn-Solingen Ltd. (now Eickhorn-Solingen GmbH)

== Description ==
The CAN bayonet 2000/2005 is a German-designed Canadian bayonet manufactured by Eickhorn-Solingen GmbH. It has wire-cutting abilities while functioning as a combat bayonet.

The CAN bayonet 2000/2005 is 311 mm (12.2 in) long in total. Its 184 mm (7.2 in) blade has a thickness of 3.4 mm (0.13 in), and the muzzle ring diameter is 22.1 mm (0.87 in).

The CAN bayonet 2000/2005 weighs 310 g (11 oz) and has a different scabbard and vest frog from the C7 Nella bayonet.

The CAN bayonet 2000/2005 uses a hilt identical to US M7 bayonet, but with a different AES design instead of replicating the entire M7 bayonet's design.

The CAN bayonet 2000/2005 is fitted with a dark olive green grip, scabbard and olive drab green scabbard carrier. It also has web frog used to be fitted onto the modular lightweight load-carrying equipment (MOLLE) system.

Component	Part No	NATO Stock Number
Bayonet	09653C-1	1095-20-001-6751
Scabbard, Bayonet	09669C-1	1095-20-001-6758
Carrier, Scabbard	0376368-1	1095-20-001-5634

== Users ==
- Canada
- Ireland
- Netherlands
- Sweden
- United Kingdom

== See also ==
- M9 bayonet
- M16 rifle
- Glock knife
- 6KH2 bayonet
- 6KH3 bayonet
- 6KH4 bayonet
- 6KH5 bayonet
- 6KH9 bayonet
- List of equipment of the Canadian Army
