= Colt Canada C7 =

Canadian assault rifle, introduced 1984

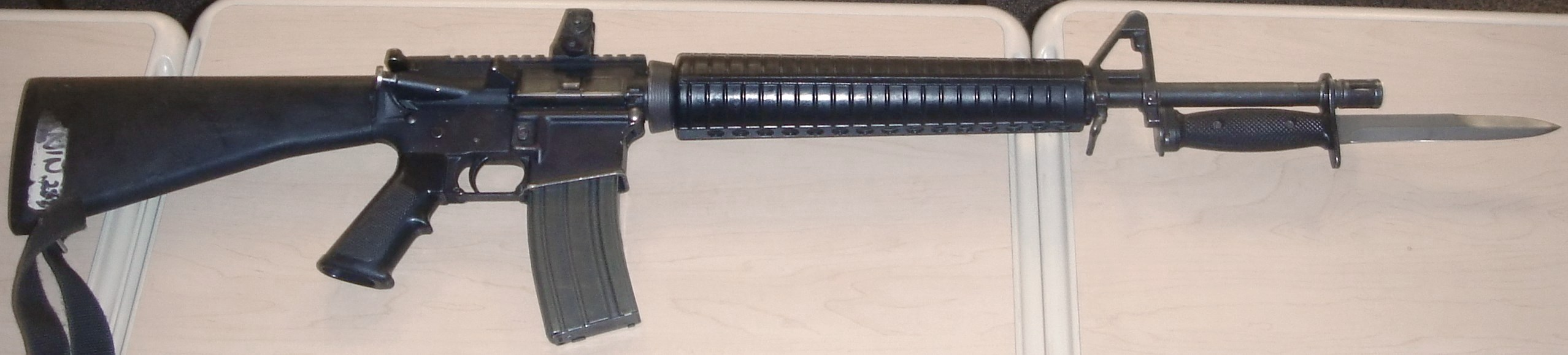
- Colt Canada C7A1 with bayonet attached
- Type: Assault rifle
- Place of origin: Canada

Service history
- In service: 1984–present
- Used by: See Users
- Wars: Rwandan Civil War; Yugoslav Wars; Somali Civil War; Sierra Leone Civil War; War in Afghanistan; Iraq War; Syrian civil war; War in Iraq (2013–2017); Russian invasion of Ukraine

Production history
- Manufacturer: Diemaco (1982–2005); Colt Canada (2005–present)
- Produced: 1982–present
- No. built: 250,000+

Specifications
- Mass: 3.3 kg (7.3 lb) (C7, unloaded); 2.68 kg (5.9 lb) (C8, unloaded)
- Length: 1,006 mm (39.6 in) (C7/C7A1/C7A2 stock extended); 929.8 mm (36.61 in) (C7A2 stock collapsed)
- Barrel length: 508 mm (20.0 in)
- Cartridge: 5.56×45mm NATO
- Action: Gas-operated, closed rotating bolt, Stoner bolt and carrier piston
- Rate of fire: 700–950 rounds/min
- Muzzle velocity: 945 m/s (3,100 ft/s) (C7); 870 m/s (2,900 ft/s) (C8)
- Effective firing range: 400 m (440 yd) (iron sights); 550 m (600 yd) (magnifying optical sight)
- Maximum firing range: 3,000 m (3,280 yd) (C7); 2,350 m (2,570 yd) (C8)
- Feed system: STANAG magazine
- Sights: Iron sights; C79 optical sight

The Colt Canada C7 is the Canadian military's adoption of Colt's Armalite AR-15 platform, manufactured by Colt Canada (formerly Diemaco), having similar design and function to the M16A3.

The C7 and its variants have been adopted as the standard-issue rifle by the militaries of Canada, Norway (special forces only), Denmark and the Netherlands. Following trials, C8 variants are general-issue firearms for the United Kingdom's Special Forces. The C8A1 is also the standard firearm of the Royal Netherlands Air Force and other specialist users within the Dutch and British militaries. It has been used in various combat deployments by Canadian, British, Norwegian, Dutch, and Danish forces in Afghanistan, Iraq, and Mali.

== History ==
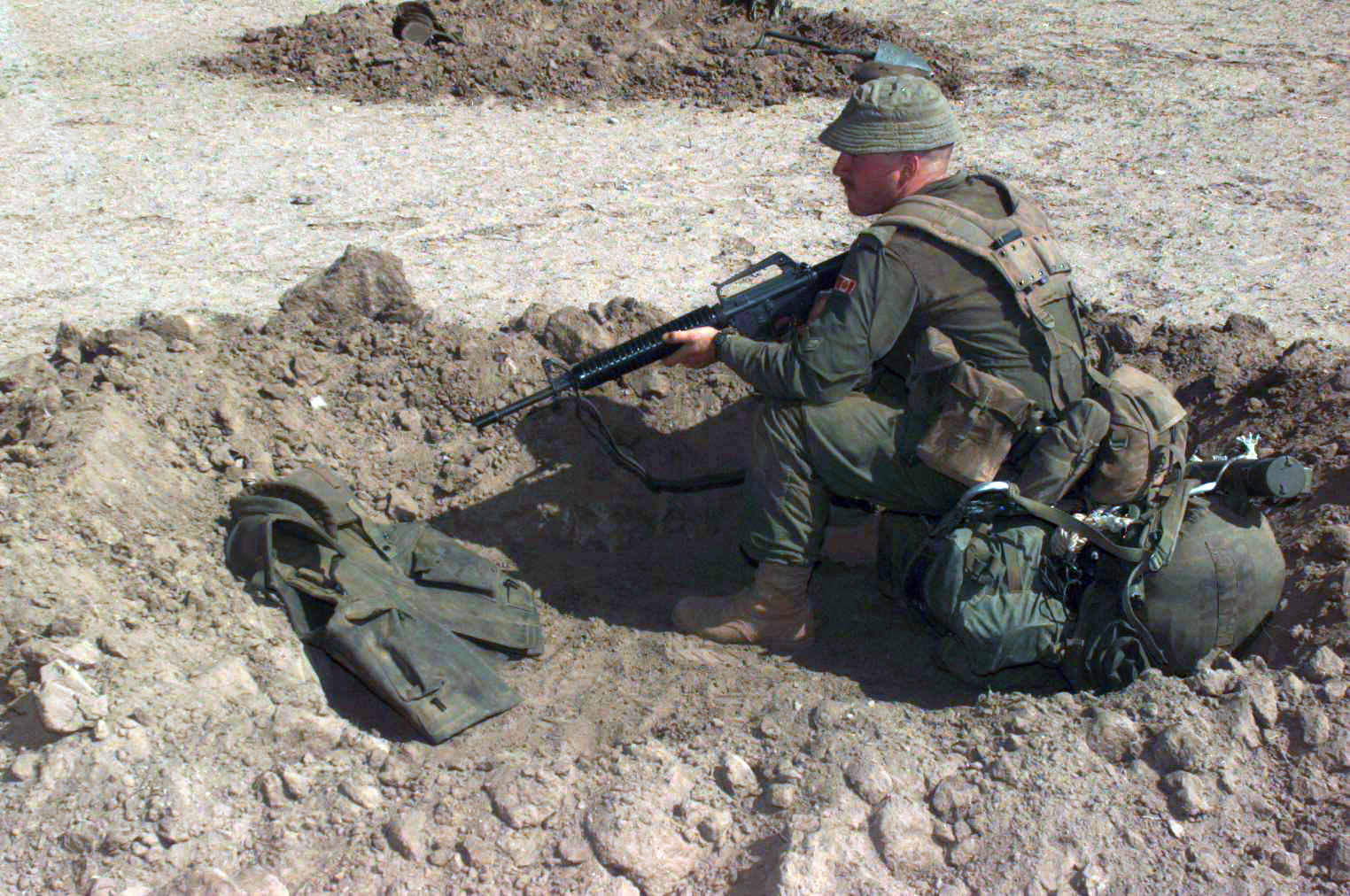
A Canadian paratrooper with a C7 rifle, 1992

The development of the C7 assault rifle paralleled that of the M16A2 by Colt. A Canadian Forces liaison officer worked with the United States Marine Corps in the M16A1 Product Improvement Program and relayed information to Canada's Rifle Replacement Program Office. The C7 is more akin to the prototype M16A1E1, rather than the final M16A2s. The earliest C7s were manufactured by Colt for the Canadian Forces as the Colt Model 715. The C7 series of firearms is driven by the same Stoner bolt and carrier gas system as the M16 series. Like the M16A1 and M16A3, the C7 has both semi-automatic and fully automatic fire modes. The C7 also features the structural strengthening, spent case deflector, improved handguards, and longer stock developed for the M16A2.

== Design details ==
Diemaco changed the trapdoor in the buttstock to allow easier access to a small storage compartment inside the stock, and a 13 mm (0.5 in) spacer is available to adjust stock length and length of pull to user preference. For the furniture Diemaco chose Fiberlite nylon-reinforced polymer suitable for CRBN decontamination and cold weather use at −68 °C (−90 °F). The carrying handle and rear sight assembly on top of the Diemaco C7 receiver features the most noticeable external difference between American M16A2s and C7s. Diemaco C7s use a modified pre-M16A2 style two aperture L-type flip rear and front post iron sight line featuring two combat settings. An approximately 0.070 in (1.8 mm) diameter aperture rear sight is used for normal firing situations for target distances up to 400 m (440 yd). A second larger approximately 0.200 in (5.1 mm) diameter aperture battle sight is used as a ghost ring for short range quick target engagement and during limited visibility.

The wing guards protected front sight was changed to a slimmer tapered round post of approximately 0.050 in (1.3 mm) diameter. C7 iron sights are normally zeroed with the normal use rear aperture sight at 300 m (330 yd) with SS109/M855/C77 ammunition. The rear sight can be zeroed for windage in 2.8 cm or 0.28 mrad increments at 100 m, when used with a 502 mm (19.8 in) rifle length sight radius. Elevation adjusting can be zeroed in 3.5 cm or 0.35 mrad increments at 100 m. Not so apparent is Diemaco's use of 1 in 178 mm (7 in) rifling twist hammer-forged chrome-lined barrel and chamber units with a slightly reducing bore diameter over the length of the rifling to increase longevity and accuracy.

These features were introduced as the Canadians originally wished to use a heavy barrel profile instead of the M16A2 profile. Diemaco developed a different mounting system from Colt for the Canadian M203 grenade launcher variant for the C7 rifle family and the bolt and bolt carrier were produced from stronger materials. Diemaco optimized the rifle for using 5.56×45mm NATO C77 cartridge L109 ball and the C78 cartridge longer L110 tracer projectiles by using a redesigned buffer assembly, thus making the extended feed ramps later introduced in the Colt M4 carbine unnecessary. The Canadian C7 was initially issued with Maple Leaf embossed Thermold polymer STANAG magazines. As the polymer failed in the Canadian weather and with age, the C7A1 was introduced with US-sourced aluminum STANAG magazines. The C7 has a cyclic rate of fire of around 700–900 rounds per minute (RPM).

== Variants ==
=== C7A1 ===
The C7A1 (Diemaco C7FT) replaces the iron sight/carrying handle assembly used on the C7 with a modified Weaver rail for mounting optics. Canadian development of rails preceded U.S. standardization of the MIL-STD-1913 "Picatinny rail", so the "Canadian Rail" or "Diemaco Rail" differs slightly. There are 14 slots instead of 13, and each slot is narrower. The height of the rail is also higher, allowing the use of a normal-height front sight base whereas a Picatinny rail requires the use of a higher F-marked front sight base to raise the post. During development, the original rails were vacuum-bonded to the top of a bare receiver. For production, the rail and receiver were made out of a single forging.

The mount can use traditional iron sights or the ELCAN C79 Optical Sight 3.4×28 optical sight, both of which can be adjusted for individual eye relief. The optical sight was designed for the C9 light machine gun and includes horizontal and vertical mil-bars used for range determination and deflection, and a tritium glow-in-the-dark aiming post rather than the traditional crosshairs. The 3.4× is powerful enough to properly see targets at the maximum accurate range of 550 m (600 yd), though like most magnified optical sights it is prone to criticism for creating tunnel vision in close quarters situations.

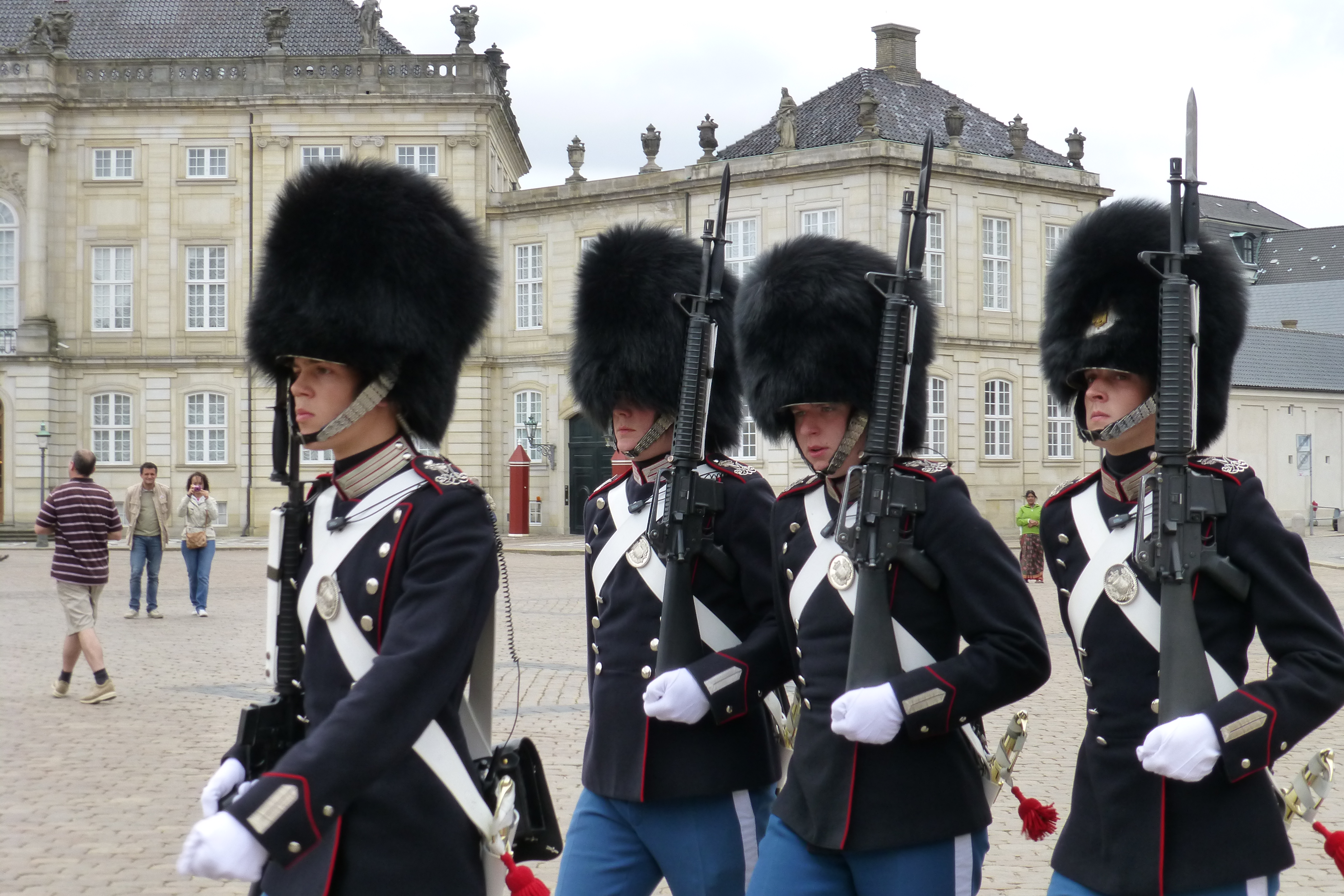
Danish Royal Life Guards with C7 assault rifles

While the wide aperture helps to speed target acquisition, Canadian soldiers generally forgo the C79 sight in favour of non-magnified optical sights or a rear back up iron sight (BUIS) when engaged or training in close quarters battle. A detachable carrying handle and rear sight assembly can also be installed on top of the receiver. The BUIS and detachable carrying handle and rear sight assembly feature L-type rear sight apertures that are the same as used in the preceding fixed carrying handle and rear sight assembly. In the later years, upon request, Diemaco/Colt Canada would manufacture MIL-STD-1913 "Picatinny rail" upper receivers.

=== C7A2 ===
With Canadian involvement in Afghanistan, Diemaco and the Canadian Forces developed improvements to the C7A1 to better suit the operational situations at hand. The result, the C7A2, has a four-point telescoping stock unit similar to that of the C8 carbine and a three-rail TRIAD that is clamped on the front sight base to allow accessories to be attached. The selector lever, magazine release, and charging handle latch became ambidextrous. Also, the C7A2 is issued with green colour furniture as standard.

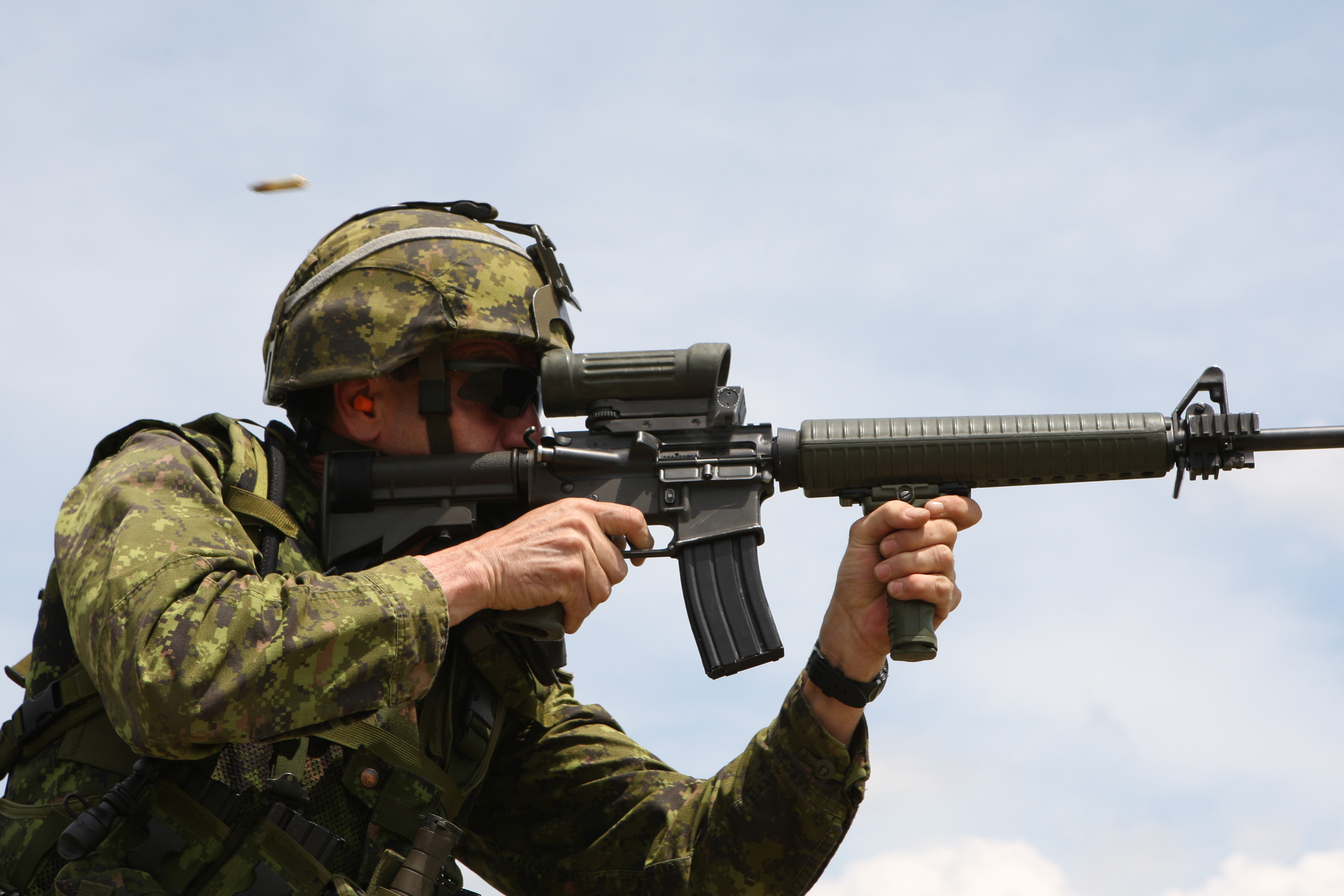
A Canadian soldier firing a C7A2. The C7A2 included a three-rail TRIAD mount clamped on its front sight.

These weapons are often seen with a similar plethora of accessories as their American counterparts given the overall commonalities of the system and the rail mounts. The C7A2 is also issued with the C79A2 ELCAN optical gunsight with 3.4× magnification but with a uniform green rubber armored coating, but some soldiers who are issued it have either been issued or have purchased sights like the EOTech holographic weapons sight and the Trijicon ACOG.

Within an eight-man section, six soldiers will normally carry a C7A2: the section commander and second in command, two grenadiers and two riflemen, with only the machine gunners carrying a C9A2 LMG. The C7A2 is considered a "mid-life" upgrade for the C7 family. The addition of the TRIAD rail mount has made it easier for soldiers to attach accessories such as laser designator and tactical lights. Many A2s are also seen with folding grips from Cadex Inc. under the handguards which can store 2 CR123 batteries.

The Canadian Forces is looking to upgrade and modernize their stockpile of C7A2 assault rifles, although nothing is yet official or certain as of 2022. One of the biggest upgrades that may be implemented is the replacement of the standard flat-top upper receiver with standard handguards, handguard end cap and front sight base with a monolithic upper receiver with integrated aluminium quad-rail handguard for increased modularity with accessories and free-floating the barrel for augmented precision. This would put the fleet of service rifles of the Canadian Armed Forces on par with Colt Canada's latest offerings and upgrades of the Danish and Dutch militaries who have adopted rifles with monolithic upper receivers.

This variant will require the use of the Colt Canada M203A1 with a different mounting system due to the new aluminium quad-rail handguard. Since Colt Canada developed and released the MRR (Modular Rail Rifle) that uses a monolithic upper receiver with the Magpul M-LOK attachment system, the Canadian Armed Forces (CAF) might be heading in that direction instead, along with a shorter, 18.6-inch (470 mm) barrel, instead of the standard 20-inch (508 mm) barrel, and straight gas tube with a low-profile gas block The possibility of using integrated suppressors is also something that is being looked into. A shorter charging-handle latch will be used instead of the very long C7A2 latch, which gets caught on equipment and vests, causing the latch to bend and break the charging-handle.

=== C8 ===
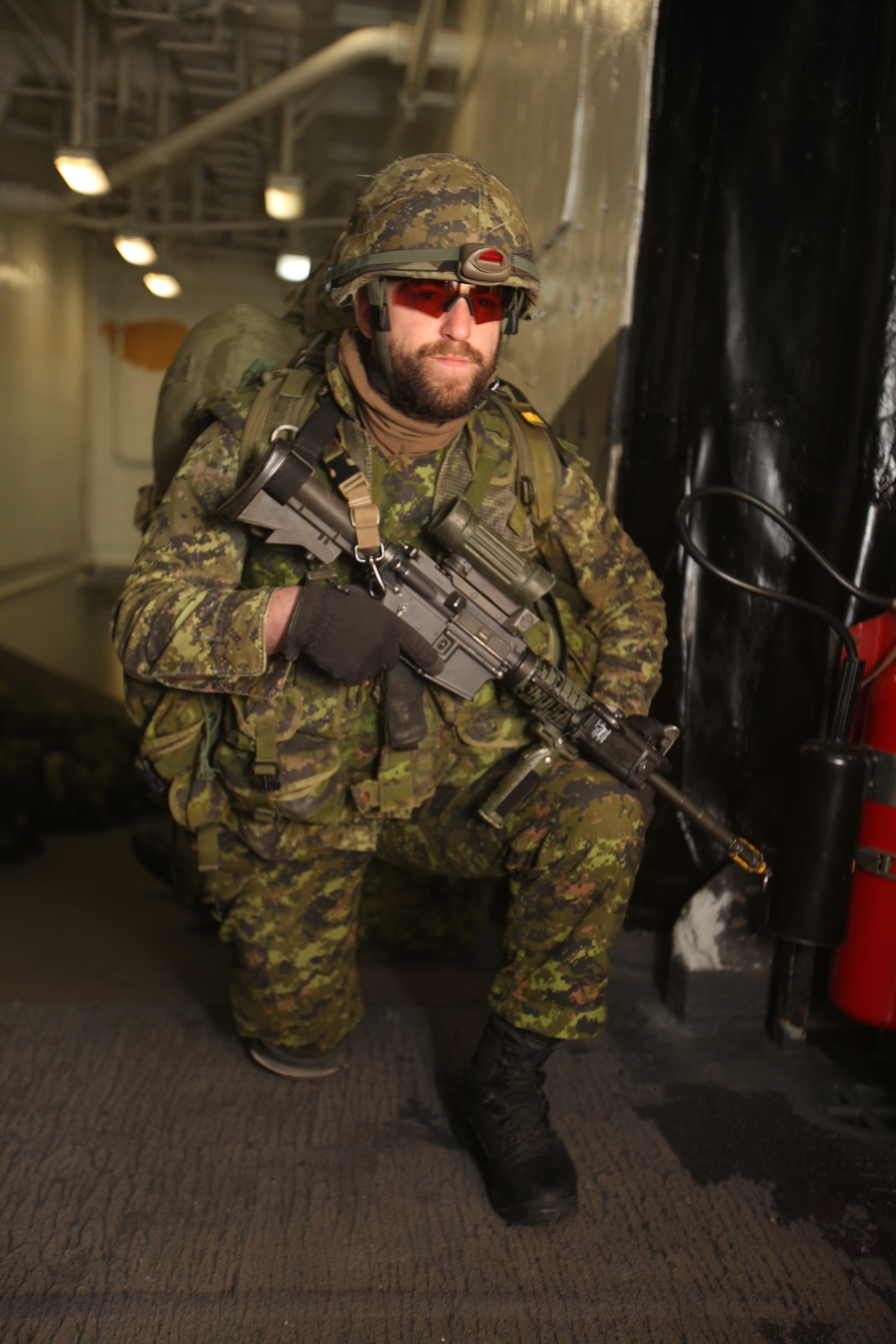
A C8 carbine with a blank-firing adapter in Canadian service, 2012

The Colt Canada C8 carbine range are carbine variants of the C7 family, and are mechanically and visually very similar to the Colt Model 723 M16A2 carbine. Colt made the initial C8s for Canadian Forces as the Colt Model 725. The C8 has a 368 mm (14.5 in) A1 profile barrel like the Colt Model 653 M16A1 carbine, but with a 1 in 178 mm (7 in) rifling twist appropriate for adequately stabilizing the 5.56×45mm NATO C77 cartridge L109 ball and the C78 cartridge longer L110 tracer projectiles and the design improvements featured on C7 assault rifles. The C8 has a cyclic rate of fire of around 750–950 rounds per minute (RPM).

C8 iron sights are normally zeroed with the normal use rear aperture sight at 250 m (273 yd) with SS109/M855/C77 ammunition. The rear sight can be zeroed for windage in 3.8 cm or 0.38 mrad increments at 100 m, when used with a 367 mm (14.45 in) carbine length sight radius. Elevation can be zeroed in 4.7 cm or 0.47 mrad increments at 100 m. Once the iron sight line is zeroed, the front sight post and rear sight should not be moved.

=== C8A1 ===
The C8A1 (Diemaco C8FT) is essentially a C8 carbine with a C7A1 flat-top upper receiver; the carbine having a 368-millimetre (14.5 in) barrel versus the 508-millimetre (20.0 in) barrel typically seen on the C7.

The overall layout of the weapon remains essentially unchanged except for the upper receiver and the general inclusion of the C79 sight. C8A1s have also been more commonly seen with the detachable carry handle with A1 sights developed by Diemaco for both the C7FT and the C8FT.

The C8A1 was never officially adopted by the Canadian Forces and was only used in Afghanistan for the ability to use the C79 optical sights.

=== C8A2 ===
The C8A2 carbine is very similar to the C8, but having a cold-hammer forged heavy 368-millimetre (14.5 in) barrel, as opposed to the 368 mm (14.5 in) pencil-profile barrel previously used and a flat-top upper receiver.

=== C8SFW ===
The Special Forces Weapon (SFW) features a longer, 410-millimetre (16.1 in) barrel of a significantly heavier profile than the C8A1 and a rail adapter system (RAS) handguard. The SFW operating system is more copiously gassed when compared to the standard C8A1 to enhance reliability in the presence of heavy fouling or icing at the expense of moving the bolt and bolt carrier faster and harder against the accordingly adapted buffer assembly, resulting in a free recoil increase. It is designed to provide a fire support capability in carbine form. A sleeve, called the Simon Sleeve, is slipped over the end of the barrel and is retained by the compensator and its crush washer. It is used to mount standard issued C7 Nella bayonet, CAN bayonet 2000/2005 and M203A1 grenade launcher.

The front sight base is strengthened for mounting of the Heckler & Koch AG-C/EGLM grenade launcher. The mass, muzzle velocity and effective range are stated as 3.4 kg (7.5 lb), 895 m/s (2,936 ft/s) and 550 m (601 yd). The C8SFW is in service with the Norwegian Special Operations Forces as their standard rifle, as the more recently introduced HK416 does not feature a "heavy profile barrel" as the C8SFW. The United Kingdom Special Forces (UKSF) adopted a C8SFW variant, under the designation "L119A1". In 2014, the UKSF upgraded to the "L119A2", which features a custom integrated upper receiver (IUR). The Royal Marines Commando have also begun to phase out the L85A2/L85A3 as their main rifle in favour of the L119.

=== C8FTHB ===
Concerns that Princess Patricia's Canadian Light Infantry had with the C8 led to the creation of the C8FTHB. The C8FTHB (Flat Top Heavy Barrel) features numerous improvements over the C8, including a heavy profile cold hammer-forged M4 profile barrel featuring a grenade launcher cut out for mounting of the Canadian Forces M203A1 and bayonet and Elcan C79 Optical Sight.

Some of the earlier C8FTHB carbines used old refurbished C8 receivers. "FTHB" was stamped next to the C8 markings on the lower receivers. Colt Canada later manufactured new lower receivers with C8FTHB markings. Later, C8FTHB carbines that were upgraded to the C8A3 standard had "A3" stamped next to the markings, resulting in "C8FTHBA3" markings. Only 400 C8FTHBs were upgraded to C8FTHBA3s before Colt Canada started simply marking new receivers as "C8A3".

=== C8A3 ===
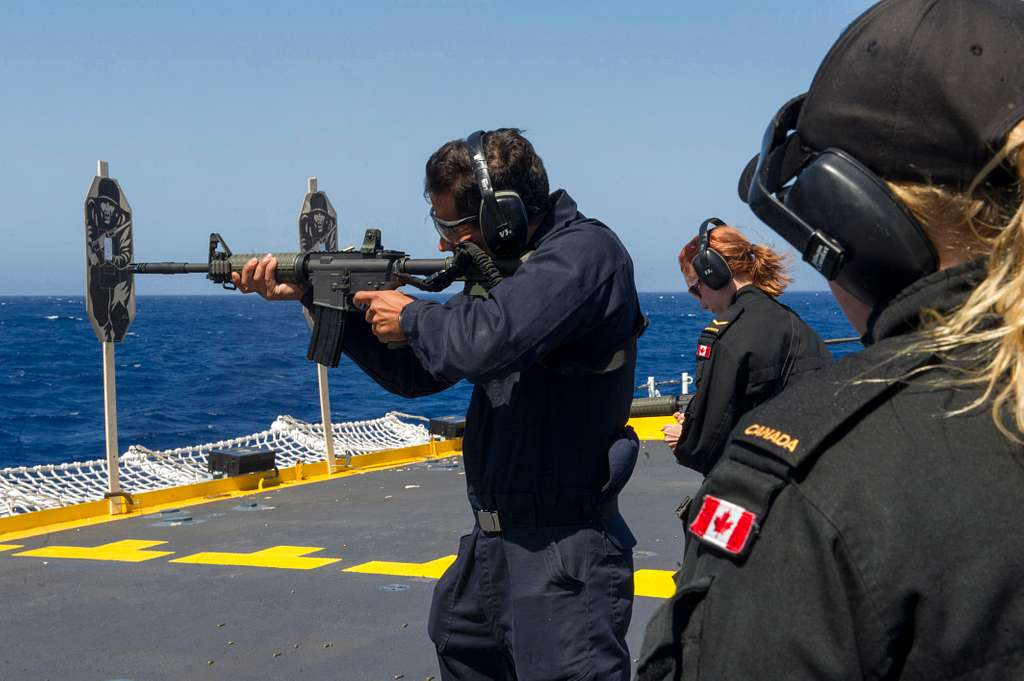
A US Navy yeoman fires a C8A3 carbine aboard HMCS Calgary

The C8FTHB was quickly replaced by the C8A3, which features the same 400 mm (15.7 in) cold-hammer forged barrel and flat-top upper receiver as the C8FTHB as well as all the mid-life upgrades that appeared on the C7A2 such as the green furniture, ambidextrous charging-handle latch, magazine release and selector lever. It also includes the TRIAD I rail for the C8, which has one slot less than the C7 TRIAD I, to accommodate the M203A1 sight.

=== C8CQB ===
Two additional C8 variants exist. The C8CQB is similar to the American Mark 18 Mod 0 CQBR, having a 254-millimetre (10.0 in) or 295-millimetre (11.6 in) heavy barrel and a Vortex Flash Hider made by Smith Enterprise Inc. The smaller Personal Defense Weapon (PDW) variant has an overall length of 530 mm (20.7 in) with its stock fully retracted. It has a 145 mm (5.7 in) barrel and the receiver has been shortened by 42 mm (1.65 in).

=== Diemaco LSW ===
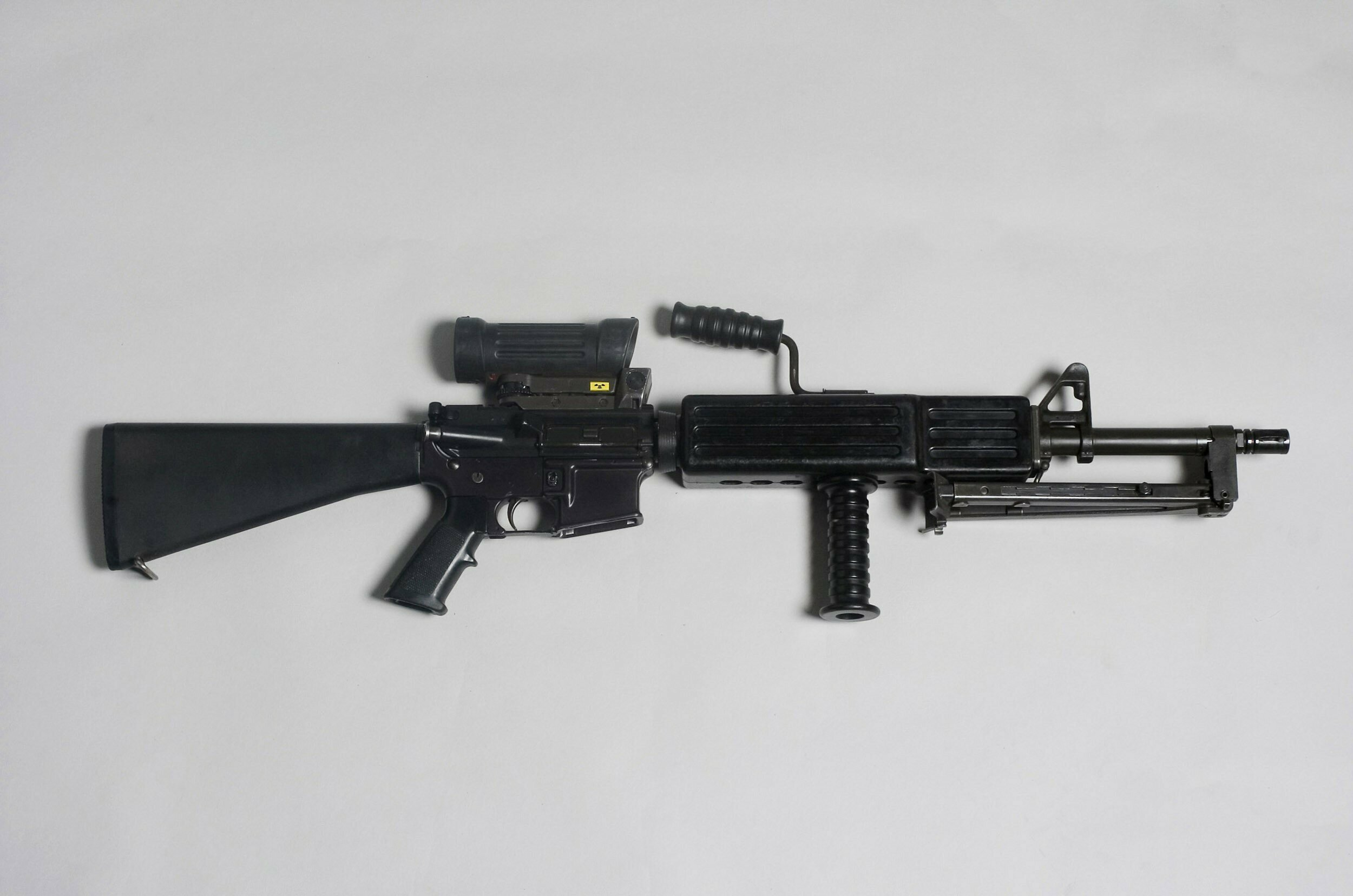
A Dutch C7 LSW with ELCAN 3.4×28 optical sight

Colt and Diemaco also paired up to develop a squad automatic weapon variant of the series. The Diemaco Light Support Weapon (LSW) features an enlarged straight gas tube and an almost 1 inch thick heavy barrel to make the barrel less susceptible for overheating and hence increase the sustained or effective rate of fire capability. The LSW can only fire automatically and uses a proprietary Diemaco hydraulic buffer assembly. The LSW has a boxy square handguard with a carrying handle and a vertical foregrip that can be used as a monopod.

The LSW was made with no bayonet lug until 2001 due to the original bipod. A new bipod attaches to the same barrel yoke as the carrying handle and front grip, so current LSWs are made with a bayonet lug. Unlike many M16 variants, it fires from an open bolt, necessitating the removal of the forward assist for operating safety. It was the only weapon in the Diemaco product line to feature an M16A2-type fully adjustable rear sight, allowing the rear sight to be dialed in for specific range settings between 300 and 800 meters and to allow windage adjustments without the need of a tool or cartridge.

The LSW was used by the Royal Danish Army and is still used by the Netherlands Marine Corps (LOAW / LOAWNLD). It fires from a closed bolt and also has a semi-automatic firing mode and forward assist. The Diemaco LSW was originally a license produced variant of the Colt 750, but both Colt and Diemaco have upgraded their respective weapons to include features like a detachable carry handle.

=== C7CT and C8CT ===
Diemaco's C7/C8 family also marketted designated marksman rifle variants, the C7CT and C8CT, with CT being short for Custom Tactical. These accurized C7/C8 variants are designed to provide accurate engagement up to 600 m (660 yd), while providing system commonality to other fielded weapons. They have two-stage match triggers and weighted stocks to counterbalance the heavy 508 mm (20.0 in) or 410 mm (16 in) free-floating barrel surrounded by a tubular forestock. A removable bipod, rails for designators, sling, etc. attach to that forestock. A special, distinctive pistol grip is fitted and the C7-style buttstock can be adjusted with shims. Sound suppressors are usually fitted. The rifle is designed as a sniper spotter weapon or a police containment weapon. The CT series weapons meet or exceed all applicable military standards including: reliability in all environmental and operational conditions, accuracy, lethality, maintainability in field conditions and safety.

Custom tactical features:

- Direct gas system: The unique direct gas system eliminates the operating rod and keeps all of the firing forces in line with the bore for maximum accuracy and reliability.
- Hammer forged heavy match barrel: The very heavy barrel profile maintains zero with accessories fitted and provides extra thermal mass to dissipate heat for enhanced consistency.
- Flat top: The upper receiver can be manufactured in the original Canadian Forces specification Weaver rail, or with a MIL-STD-1913 Picatinny rail.

=== C10 small bore training version ===
Diemaco offered a training version of the C7 named the C10, which would be a semi-automatic variant chambered in .22 Long Rifle ammunition. The polymer stock and lower receiver would be one piece. The C10 was proposed but never implemented.

=== IUR – Integrated Upper Receiver ===
In 2008 or 2009, Colt Canada introduced a completely new designed upper receiver with integrated rail attachment system. The front handguard is in this system permanently attached to the upper receiver. The whole system is forged from one piece, and is sometimes called a monolithic rail. This system allows for a completely free floating barrel. Another unique feature is that the system can be adapted for different barrel lengths by screwing on an extension.

The system was introduced as an upgrade in the Dutch Army with the C7 and C8 in 2009. In 2010, the C8 IUR (Integrated Upper Receiver) was introduced as an upgrade by all four branches of the Danish military and the Danish Security and Intelligence Service's SWAT teams, as the "Gevær M/10". In 2011, the Royal Canadian Mounted Police adopted a semi-automatic only version of the C8 IUR with ancillary components as their patrol carbine.

=== MRR – Modular Rail Rifle ===
Colt Canada introduced the MRR, or Modular Rail Rifle, in 2015 and released it for sale to the market in 2016. It is essentially a monolithic upper receiver with Magpul's M-LOK attachment system for accessories. The rifles are offered with 11.6, 14.5, 15.7 and 18.6 in (290, 370, 400 and 470 mm) barrels. The 11.6 in (290 mm) version features a shorter handguard. As of late 2016, the 14.5 in (370 mm) variant is offered only to law enforcement and the military.

=== Canadian Modular Assault Rifle ===
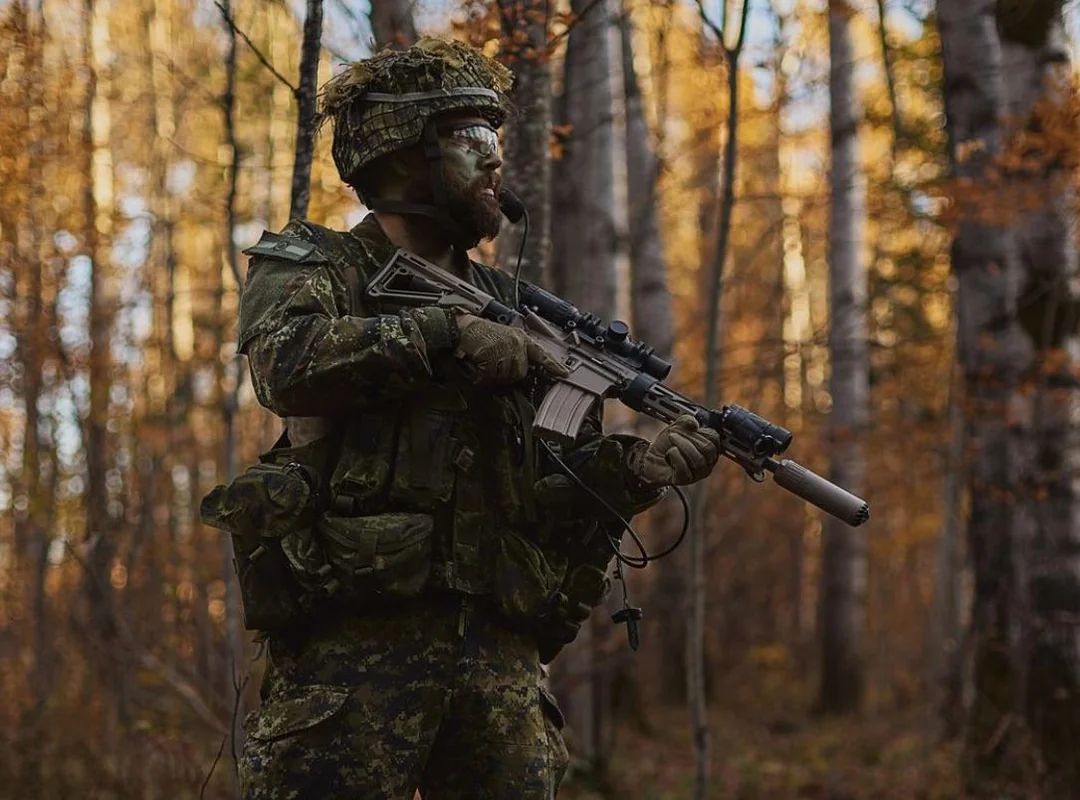
A member of the Governor General's Foot Guards with a MRR prototype

A variant of the MRR platform of Colt Canada's C7 and C8 family of rifles was unveiled at the CANSEC 2024 exhibition as part of the Canadian Modular Assault Rifle (CMAR) program. It is set to replace the aging fleet of C8A3s and C7A2s within the CAF. According to the Canadian government, the contract will be for the procurement of up to 65,402 weapons: 16,195 will be the Canadian Armed Forces' Full Spectrum (FS) variant, and the remaining 49,207 will be the General Service (GS) variant. The CMAR (GS) will be designated the C25 and come equipped with a custom 1–6× low-power variable optic, along with a custom dual-ring mounting solution designed by Colt Optic and manufactured in Canada.

== Comparison table of C7 and C8 variants ==
Colt model number	Diemaco model number	Canadian designation	British designation	Danish designation	Barrel length	Barrel type	Handguard type	Buttstock type	Pistol grip type	Lower receiver type	Upper receiver type	Rear sight type	Muzzle device	Forward assist?	Case deflector?	Bayonet lug?	Trigger pack
715	C7	C7	N/A	N/A	508 mm (20.0 in)	A2 Profile (1 in 180 mm (7 in) twist)	Full-length ribbed	Fixed A2	A2	A2	A2	A1	M16A2-style birdcage flash suppressor	Yes	Yes	Yes	S-R-Auto
N/A	C7FT	C7A1	N/A	Gv M/95	508 mm (20.0 in)	A2 Profile (1 in 180 mm (7 in) twist)	Full-length ribbed	Fixed A2	A2	A2	Flattop	None	M16A2-style birdcage flash suppressor	Yes	Yes	Yes	S-R-Auto
N/A	C7A2	C7A2	N/A	N/A	508 mm (20.0 in)	A2 Profile (1 in 180 mm (7 in) twist)	Full-length ribbed	Four-position retractable	A2	A2	Flattop	None	M16A2-style birdcage flash suppressor	Yes	Yes	Yes	S-R-Auto
750	LSW	N/A	N/A	LSV M/04	508 mm (20.0 in)	A2 HBAR Profile (1 in 180 mm (7 in) twist)	Square LMG	Fixed A2	A2	A2	A2 or Flattop	A2 or None	M16A2-style birdcage flash suppressor	Yes or No	Yes	Yes or No	S-R-Auto or S-Auto
725	C8	C8	N/A	N/A	368 mm (14.5 in)	A1 Profile (1 in 180 mm (7 in) twist)	Short cylindrical ribbed	Two-position retractable	A2	A2	A2	A1	M16A2-style birdcage flash suppressor	Yes	Yes	Yes	S-R-Auto
N/A	C8FT	C8A1	N/A	N/A	368 mm (14.5 in)	A1 Profile (1 in 180 mm (7 in) twist)	Short cylindrical ribbed	Four-position retractable	A2	A2	Flattop	None	M16A2-style birdcage flash suppressor	Yes	Yes	Yes	S-R-Auto
N/A	C8FTHB	C8A2	N/A	Kb M/96	368 mm (14.5 in)	A2 HBAR Profile (1 in 180 mm (7 in) twist)	Short cylindrical ribbed	Four-position retractable, Three on the DK vers.	A2	A2	Flattop	None	M16A2-style birdcage flash suppressor	Yes	Yes	Yes	S-R-Auto
N/A	SFW	N/A	L119A1	N/A	410 mm (16.1 in)	SFW Profile (1 in 180 mm (7 in) twist)	KAC M4 RAS	Four-position retractable	A2	A2	Flattop	None	M16A2-style birdcage flash suppressor	Yes	Yes	Yes	S-R-Auto

== In non-Canadian service ==
=== Denmark ===
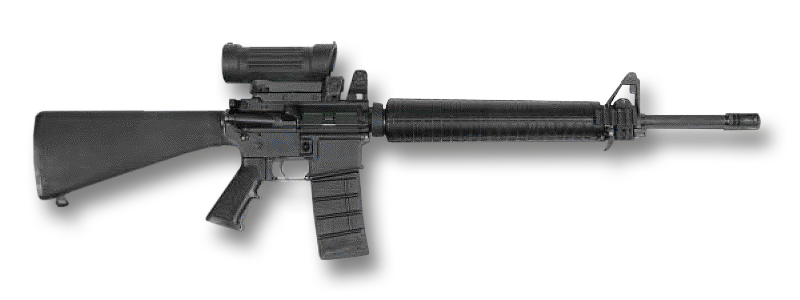
C7A1 with ELCAN 3.4× optical sight and rear back up iron sight (BUIS) and TRIAD mount at the front sight base in Danish service.

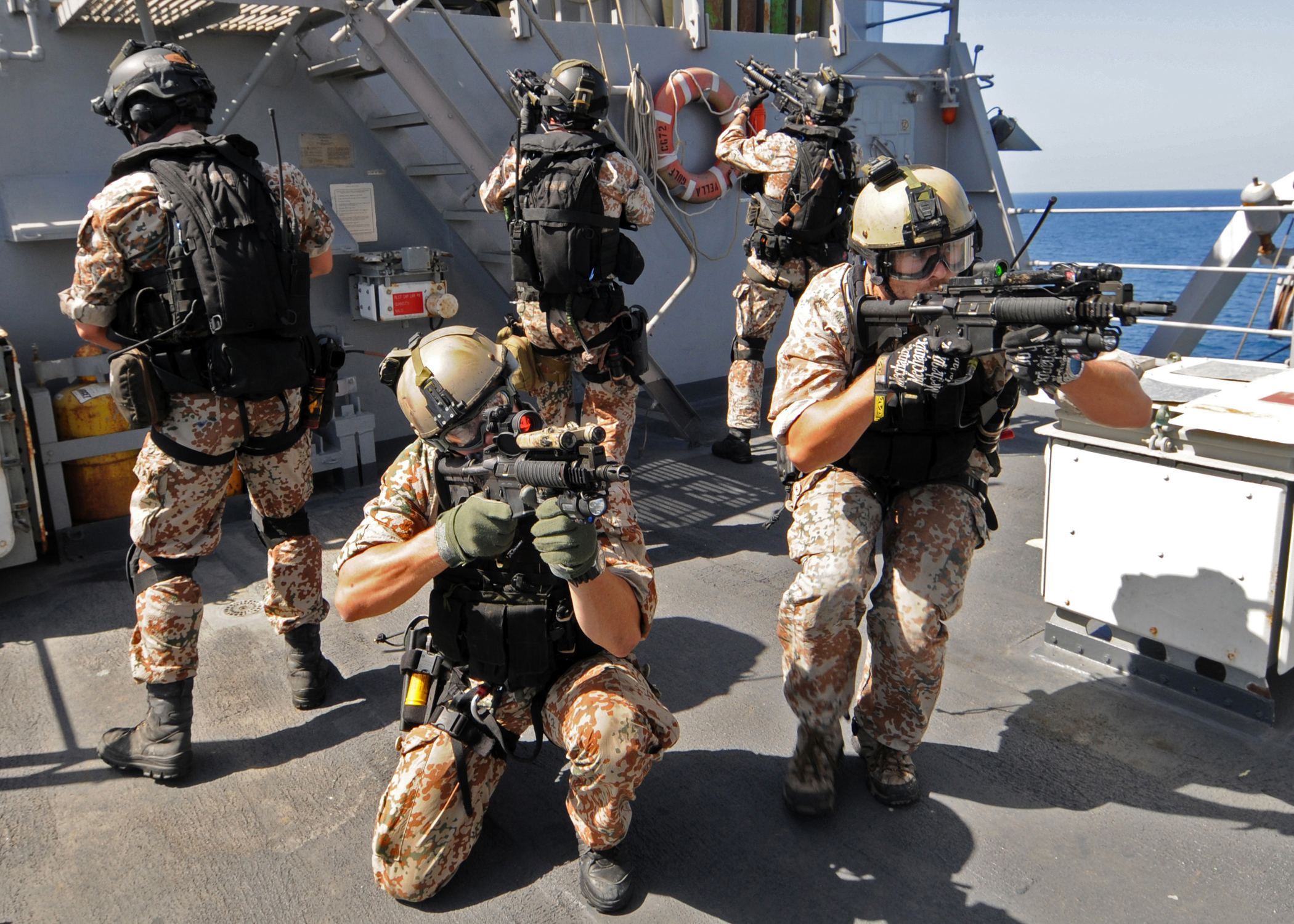
C8 CQB (Close Quarters Battle) as used by a boarding team of the Royal Danish Navy.

Denmark bought the first batch of C7A1 in 1995 and C8A1 in 1996, designating them the M/95 and M/96 carbine. In 2004, the LSW, designated as the LSV M/04 was added to the arsenal. These were to replace the German made M/75, which had been the main infantry weapon since 1975.

The C7A1 was issued to standard infantry units of the Royal Danish Army. The C8A1 is issued to units where the physically longer C7A1 could be obstructive to the unit's primary work, such as logisticians, tankers and special units. The Denmark Special Forces, the Jægerkorpset and Frømandskorpset used the C8SFW, notably during the pull out of Afghanistan. The SSR, a special LRRP-unit under the Hjemmeværn command, also uses the C8SFW.

The LSW used to be issued to "support gunners" in infantry squads to get a lighter support weapon than the M/62 for patrolling in Afghanistan. The Royal Danish Army later adopted the M60E6 machine gun in 2014 for the support role. All LSWs have later been transferred to the Danish Home Guard.

The Army used the C7A1 designated M/95 and C8A1 designated M/96 with the Elcan C79 optical sight until the adoption of the M10 and was transferred to the Danish Home Guard who now use them along with the C8A2 with Aimpoint red dot sights.

The C7A1 was first issued to field units of Logcoy/Danbn/Dancon of the Danish International Brigade, in October–November 1995 shortly before the transition from UNPROFOR to IFOR in Bosnia.

On 4 January 2009, the Danish Army lost a number of weapons including M/95 and M/96 rifles to armed robbers who overpowered the guards at Antvorskov Barracks. The robbery was solely made possible because of inside knowledge and help. The police recovered the last of the stolen weapons on 22 November 2011.

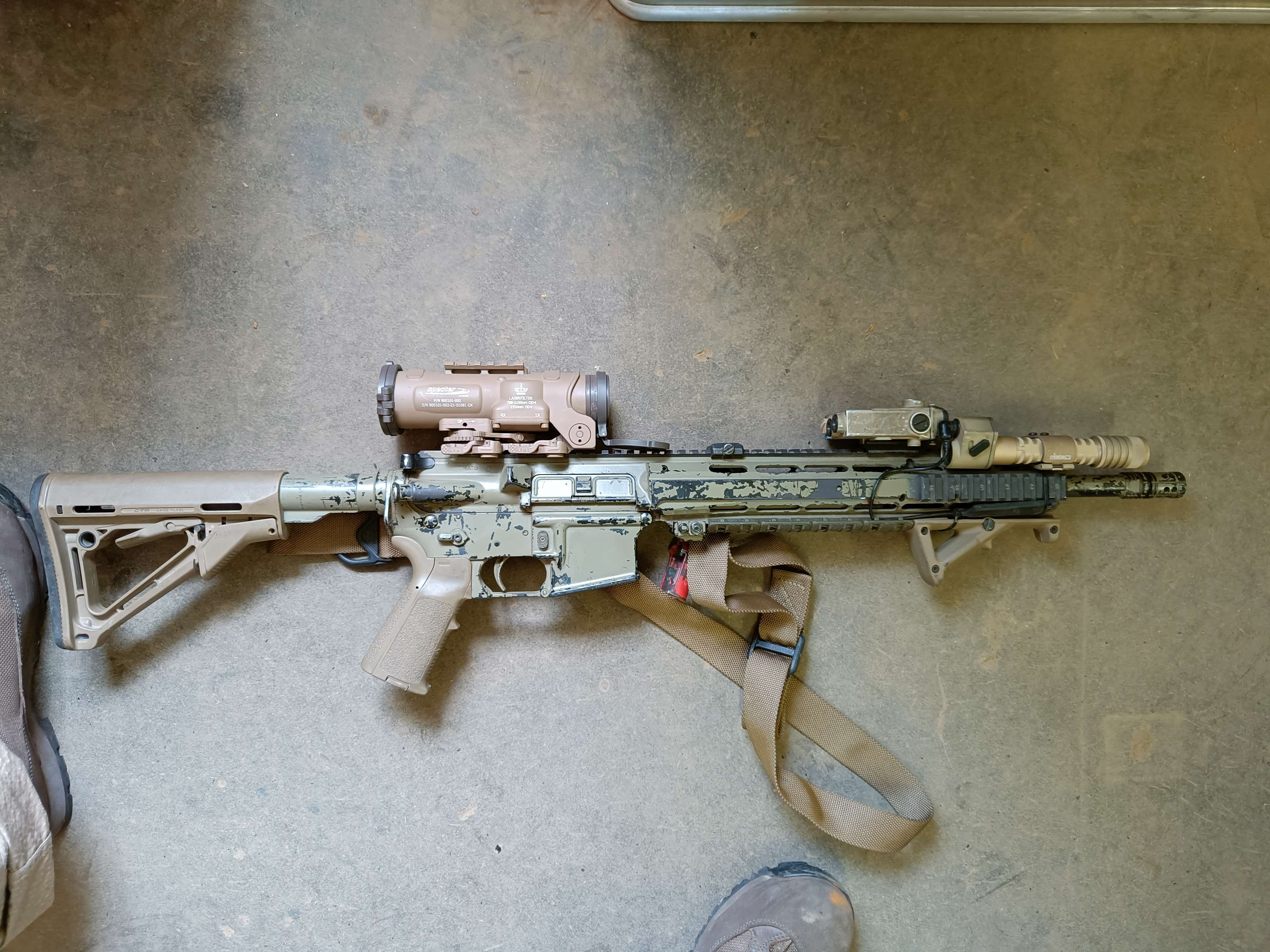
4th and current M10 variant in use by Danish soldiers (issued with Spectre DR 1-4× optics and both angled and vertical foregrips by Magpul)

In 2010 the Danish DALO(Defence Acquisition and Logistics Organization) ordered an improved version of the M/96 and M/95 from Colt Canada under the Danish designation M/10, which Colt Canada designated the C8 IUR. It features a 401 mm (15.8 in) free floating barrel, fully ambidextrous controls, flip up iron sights, a collapsible buttstock with more positions, and the Integrated Upper Receiver (IUR).

During the 2015 Copenhagen shootings, one victim was killed with an M/95 issued to the Danish Home Guard that was stolen in a home invasion robbery.

The M/10 has gone through multiple changes since its original introduction in the Danish Army, including an extension of the rail and removal of the built-in iron sights in favor of Magpul MBUS Picatinny mounted back-up sights, buttstock changed to Magpul CTR stocks, and an olive drab finish instead of the old black and is issued with ELCAN Spectre DR 1-4× optics. Magpul is to be switched out as the provider sometime soon as a new deal for weapon attachments was made in 2022.

The Danish armed forces are procuring a new modular assault rifle, the M25 C8 Modular Rail Rifle (MRR). A framework agreement for 26,000 rifles was signed. This was announced in a press release from Colt CZ Group, the parent company of Colt Canada, in early September 2025.

=== Netherlands ===
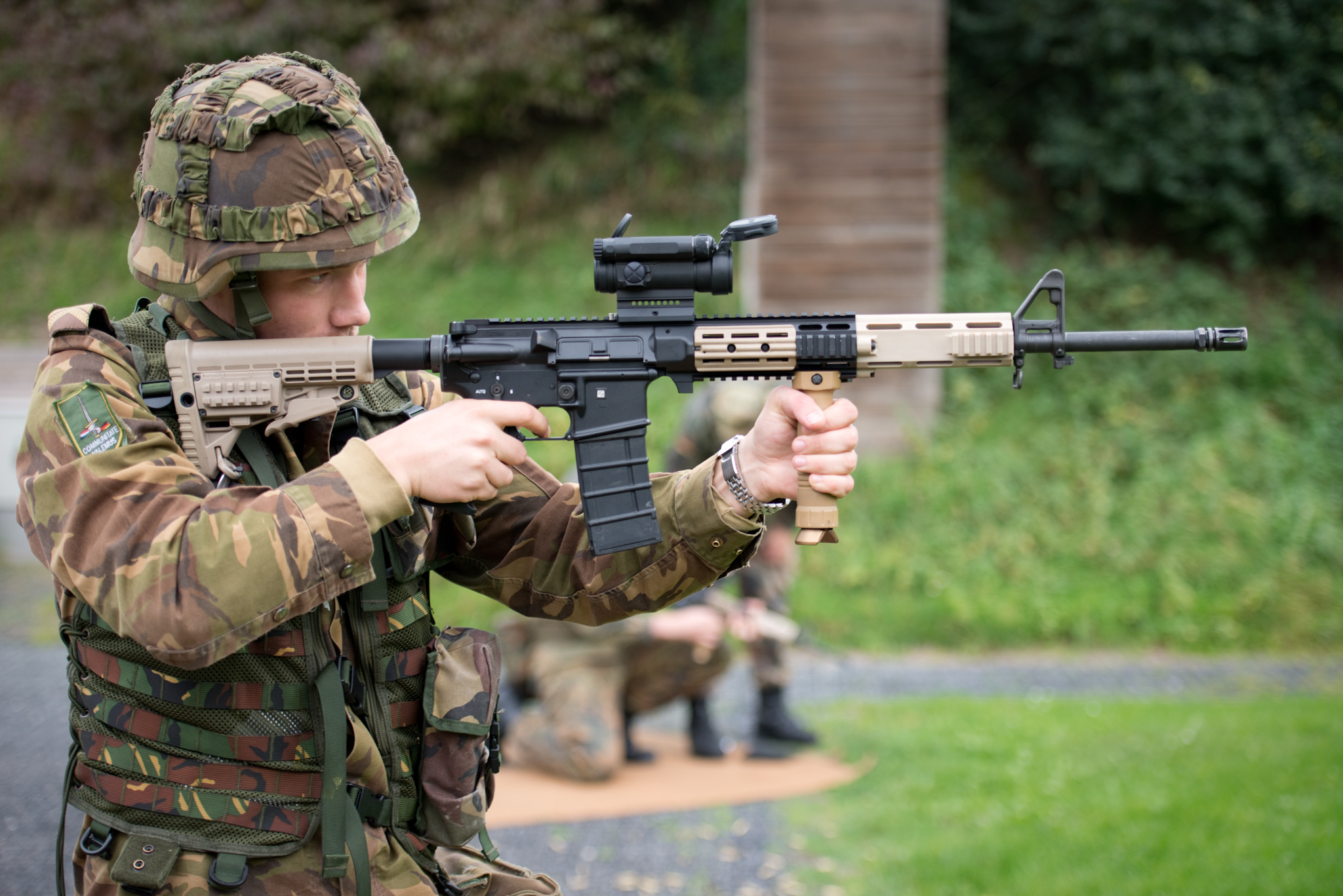
C7NLD assault rifle, 2013

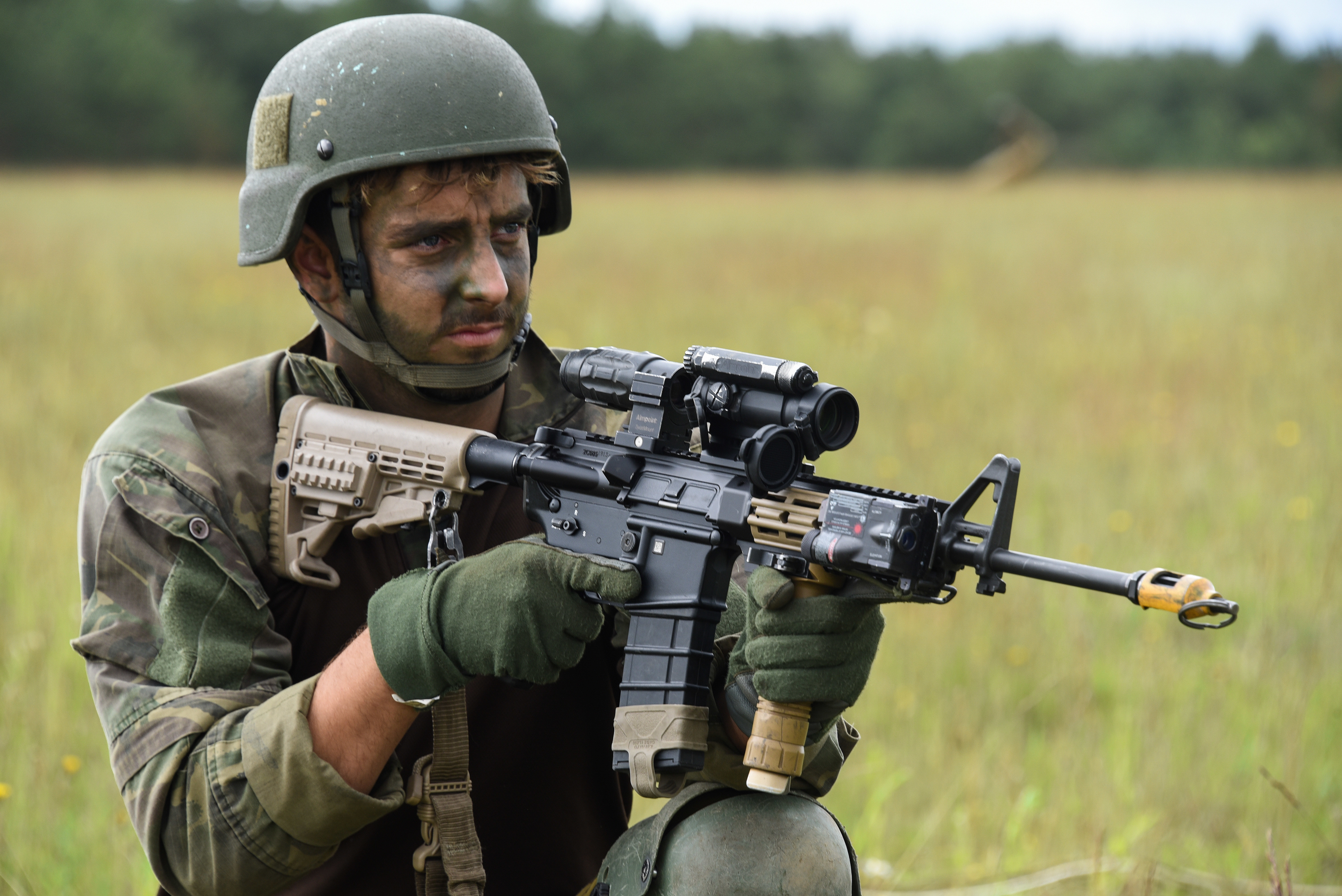
C8NLD carbine, 2016

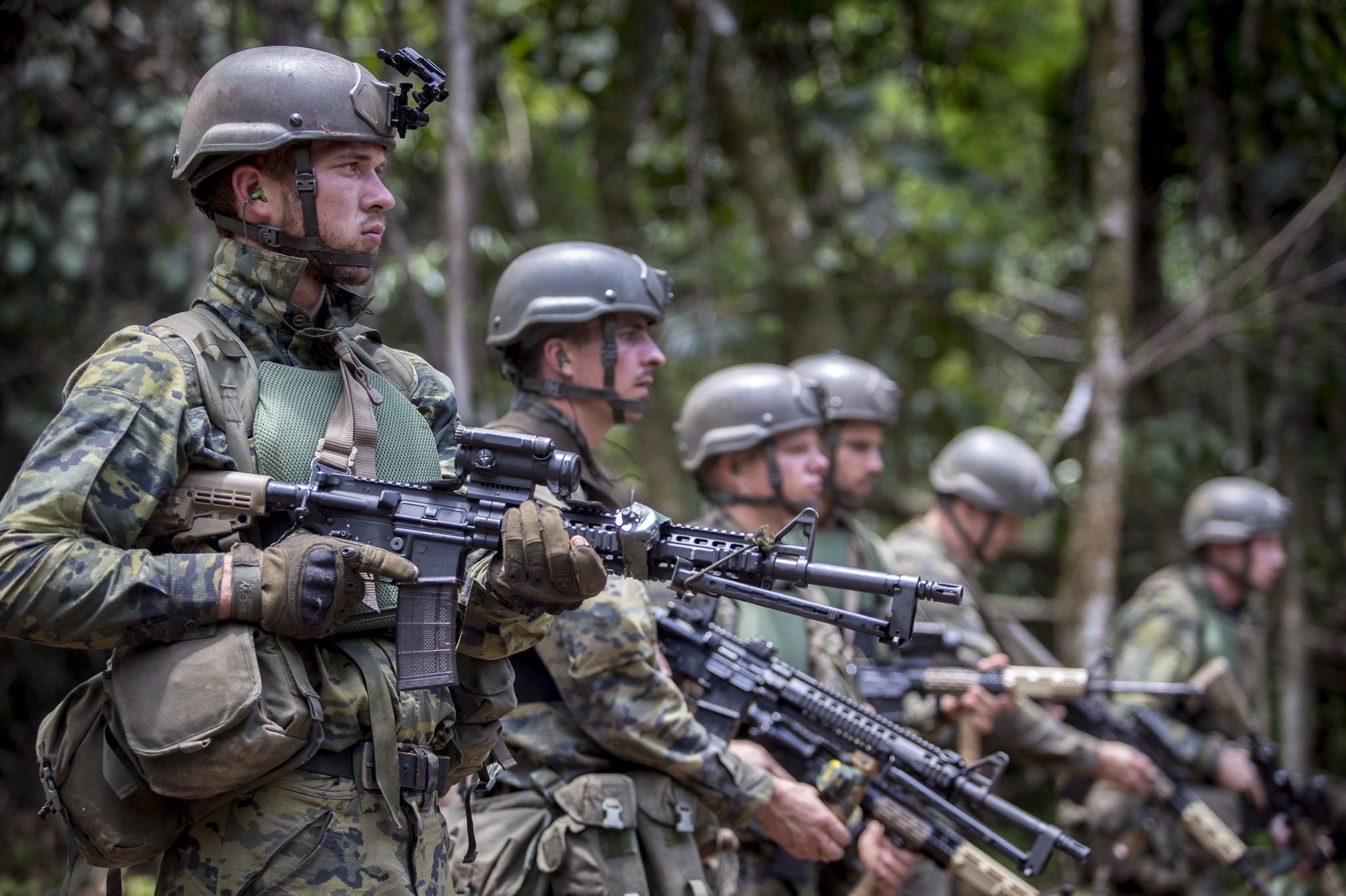
LOAWNLD light machine gun, 2020

Upgraded variants of the C7 weapons family in Dutch service

After a selection process and trials program starting in 1991, the Netherlands purchased over 53,000 C7A1, C8A1 and LOAW weapons (C7 with polymer Thermold STANAG magazines in March 1994). The most commonly used version in the Netherlands Armed Forces was the C7 with iron sights. The Royal Netherlands Navy ordered only weapons fitted with magnifying sighting systems to fulfil its 500 m (550 yd) effective range requirement. The 11 Luchtmobiele Brigade (Airmobile Brigade), consisting of 11 Infantry Battalion Garderegiment Grenadiers en Jagers, 12 Infantry Battalion Regiment Van Heutsz and 13 Infantry Battalion Regiment Stoottroepen Prins Bernhard uses the C7A1, and the C8A1 (Diemaco C8FT) was mainly used by the Korps Commandotroepen, the paratroopers of the Luchtmobiele Brigade (one company per battalion), the Korps Mariniers and most of the recon units of the various combat units, including the Forward Air Controllers and the reconnaissance units of the cavalry and the artillery. The Korps Mariniers also uses the LSW, which is locally known as LOAW.

From 2009 onwards many of the Dutch C7 assault rifles, C8 carbines and LOAW light machine guns received an overhaul: the black furniture was replaced with dark earth furniture. New parts include a new retracting stock, ambidextrous controls, the Diemaco Integrated Upper Receiver (IUR) with a free-floating barrel, RIS rails for mounting flashlights and laser systems, a vertical forward grip with built-in bipod also known as a "Grip Pod" and other accessories; the polymer STANAG magazines became not exclusively black in color as translucent smoke colored Lancer L5AWM 30-round magazines (NSN: 1005-01-657-7839L5) were also introduced along the Thermold magazines. The ELCAN 3.4× optical sight was also dropped in favour of the Swedish made non-magnifying Aimpoint CompM4 red dot sight and if desired an accompanying Aimpoint red dot magnifier. These upgraded versions are now designated as C7NLD, C8NLD, and LOAWNLD. The Dutch arms often feature an armorer white QR code on the right of the magazine housing.

=== United Kingdom ===
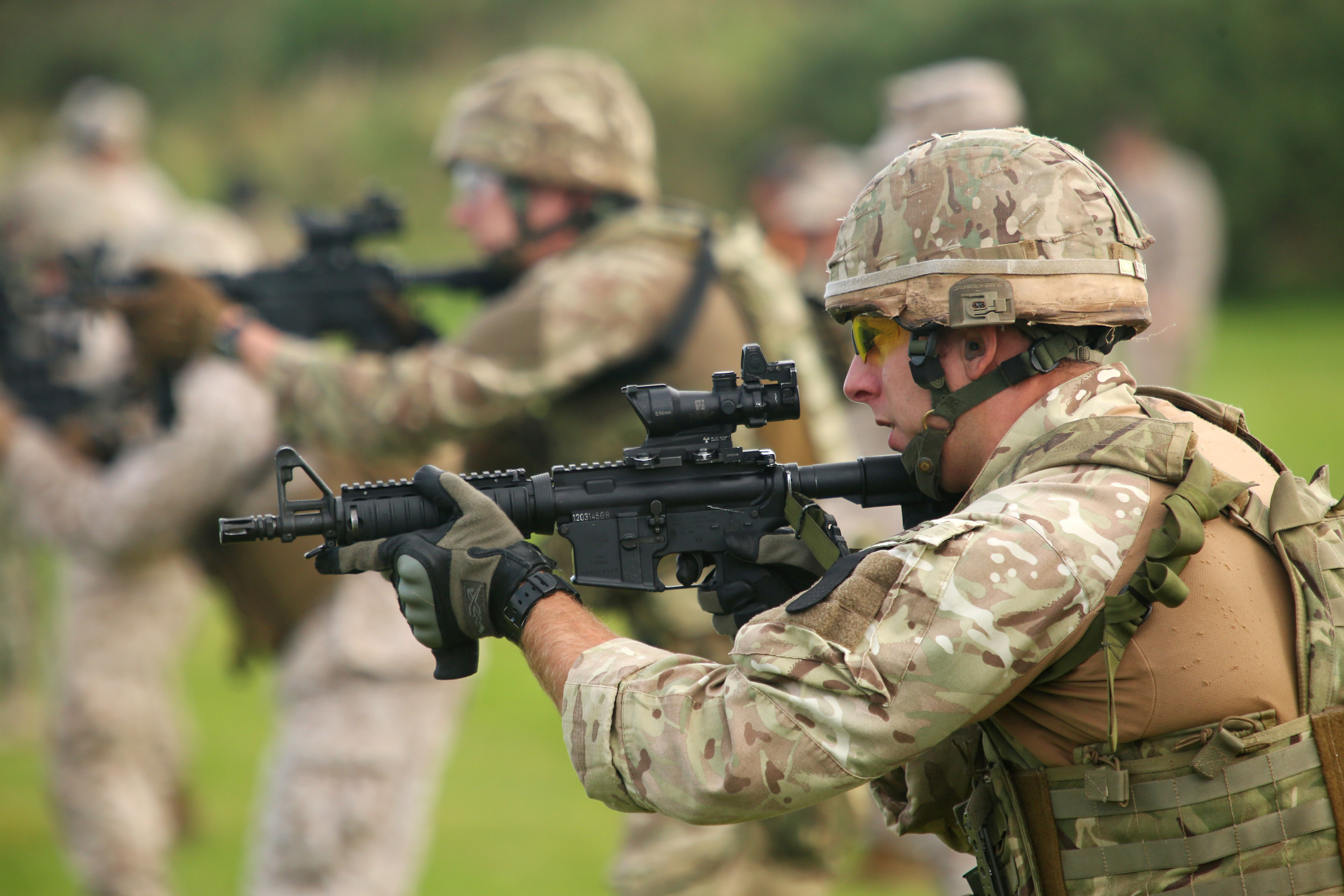
Royal Marines from 43 Commando Fleet Protection Group with L119A1 rifles fitted with CQB upper receivers in 2014 (five years prior to the L119 being adopted by the Royal Marines as a whole).

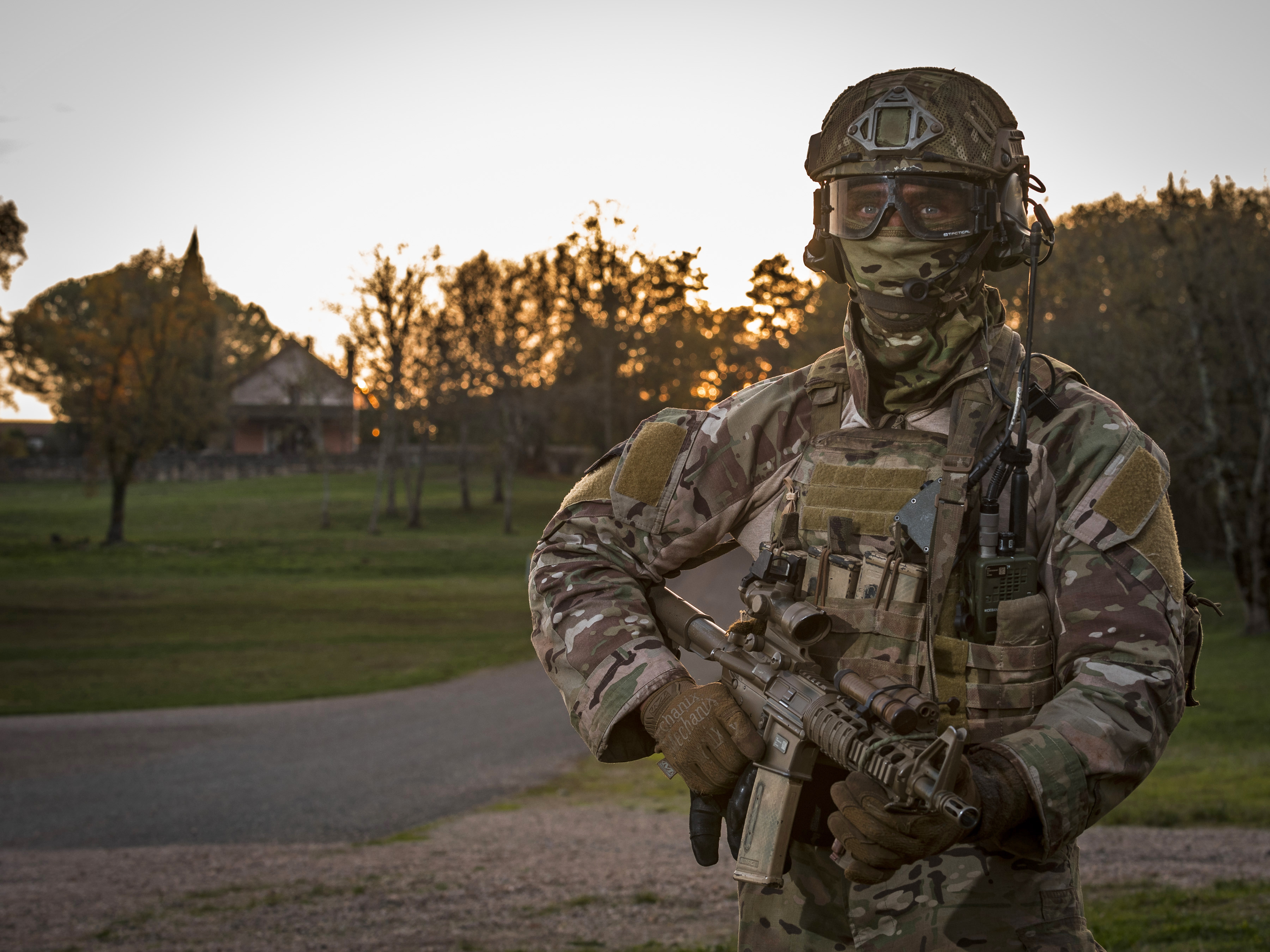
Pathfinder Platoon soldier with L119A1 rifle fitted with a CQB upper receiver in 2018.

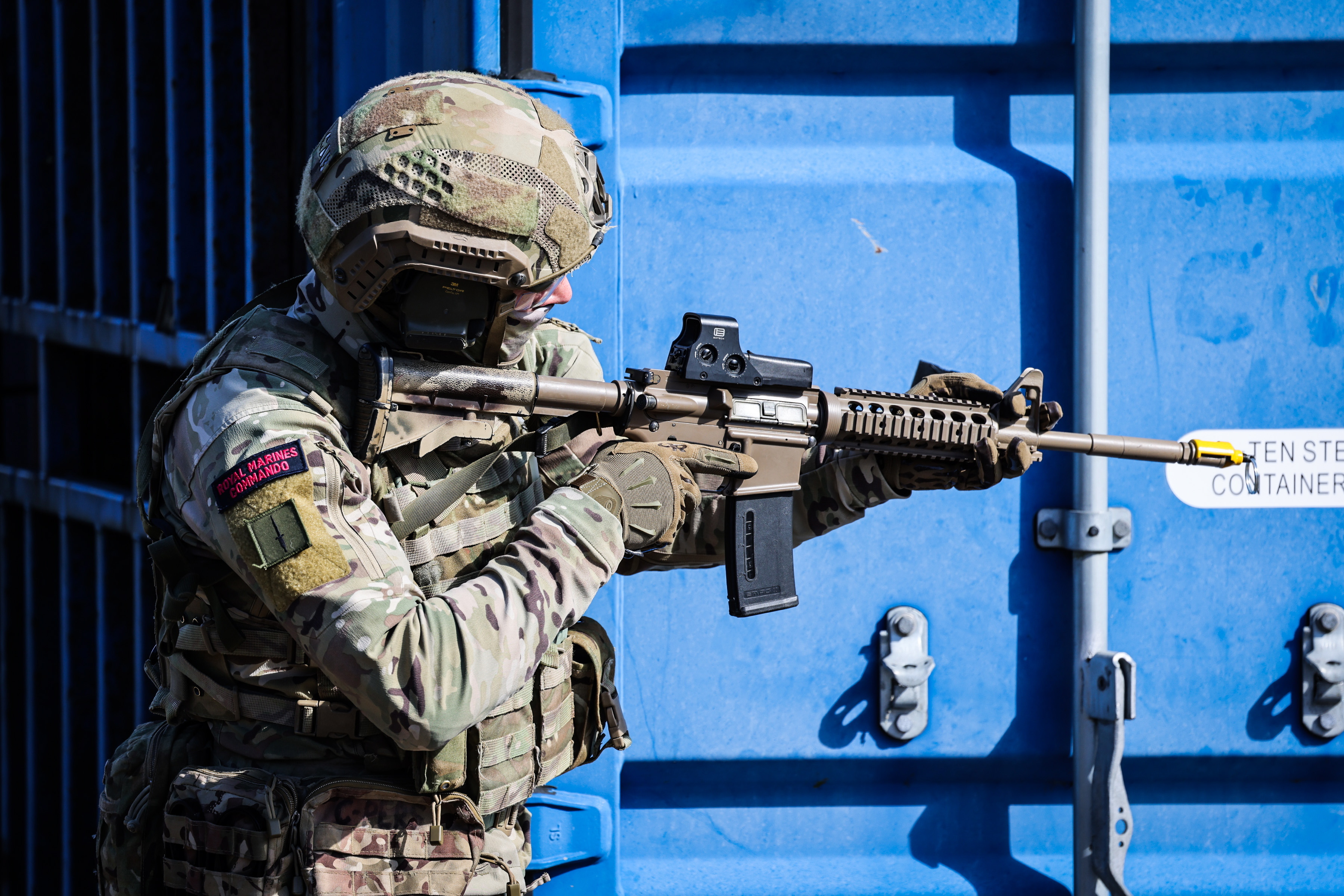
Royal Marine from 40 Commando with L119A1 carbine in 2021.

During the SFW trials, the C8 outperformed both the Heckler & Koch G36 and the SIG SG551. The C8SFW was subsequently adopted in 2000 under the designation, L119A1.

Use of the C8 has expanded to include, among others, the SAS and SBS, the Special Forces Support Group, the Pathfinder Platoon of 16 Air Assault Brigade, Royal Military Police Close Protection teams and MoD Police. Most weapons are now fitted with Knights Armaments Rail Adapter System handguards (that hold zero on the top and the bottom rails) and Picatinny rail flat-top upper receivers. The muzzle velocity and effective range are stated as 895 m/s (2,936 ft/s) and 550 m (601 yd) with a 400 mm (15.7") barrel and 790 m/s (2,592 ft/s) and 250 m (273 yd) with a 254 mm (10.0") CQB barrel.

Most users fit Trijicon ACOG 4×32 sights with CQB reflex attachment, but other sights are used. Various lasers, lights, foregrips and other attachments are used. Surefire 4-prong flash hiders are generally fitted, and suppressors are available. The standard Canadian bayonet is issued but rarely used. Coloured furniture is becoming commonplace. The United Kingdom prefers polymer magazines to metal ones on grounds of weight and reliability and has now standardised on these for all C8 and operational SA80 users, with well over a million magazines purchased. Many weapons are fitted with the L17A1 underslung 40 mm grenade launcher (UGL), the UK designation for the Heckler & Koch AG-C/EGLM. Detachable shoulder stocks are available for stand-alone use of the UGL.

43 Commando Fleet Protection Group replaced their L85A2 rifles with the C8 in 2016. In 2019, The Times reported that the C8 would become the standard-issue rifle of the Royal Marines replacing the SA80.

In July 2013, the British Ministry of Defence contracted Colt Canada for a £2.8 million mid-life upgrade of the L119A1 carbines used by the United Kingdom Special Forces. Subsequently, from 2014 the L119A1 was upgraded to the L119A2. There are two L119A2 variants: The standard Carbine with a 400 mm (15.7 in) barrel and CQB (Close Quarter Battle) with a 254 mm (10.0 in) barrel. The CQB variant has seen the most widespread use. Both L119A2 variants feature a custom integrated upper receiver (IUR) with rails that hold zero all around, a lighter profile barrel, straight gas tubes, Geissele trigger, SureFire 4-prong flash hider, a tan coloured Magpul 6 position collapsible CRT buttstock, Ergo pistol grip, and ambidextrous controls.

=== Botswana ===
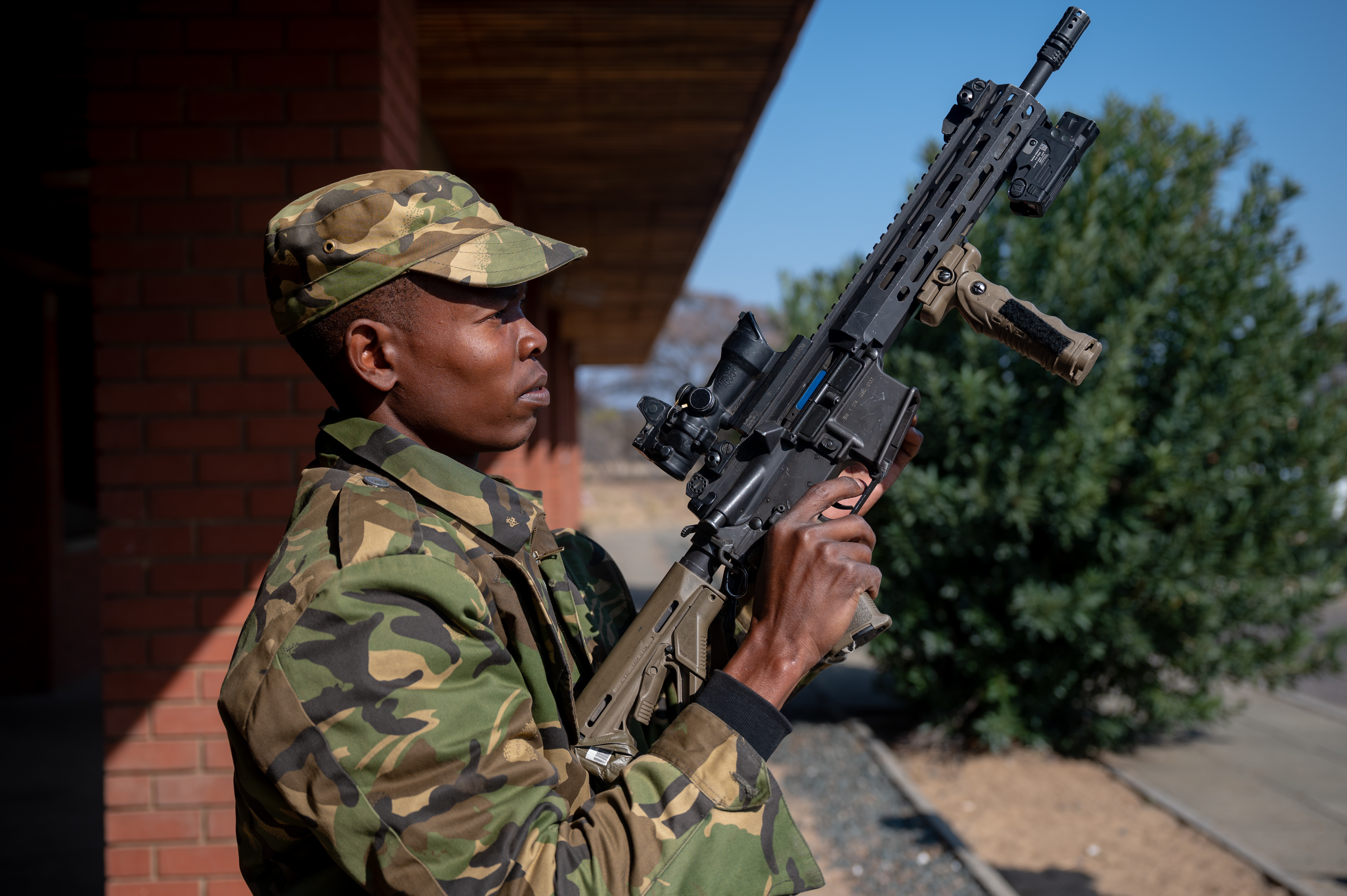
A member of the Botswana Defence Force places a training bolt in his Colt Canada MRR

The Botswana Defence Force uses the MRR15.7M and MRR11.6S Modular Rail Rifle as patrol and Close Quarter Battle carbines. These feature an integrated upper receiver, ambidextrous controls, ambidextrous charging handle, custom folding front & rear sights, tan coloured Magpul MOE pistol grip and Magpul CTR buttstock. They are deployed for national defence, foreign peace-keeping and anti-poaching tasks.

=== Afghanistan ===
In 2007 and 2008, Canada donated 2,500 surplus C7 assault rifles to the Afghan National Army. In 2011, the ANA gave back the C7s since as Afghan security forces chose the American M16 instead. Canadian Forces officials said the Canadian rifles would be shipped to Canada for disposal.

=== Ukraine ===
In 2022, Canada donated C8A1 carbines to the Ukrainian Ground Forces which were seen in use with multiple military units since then. From 2022 to mid-2025, the Netherlands also provided over 10,000 C7/C7A1 and newer C7NLD rifles to Ukraine.

== Users ==
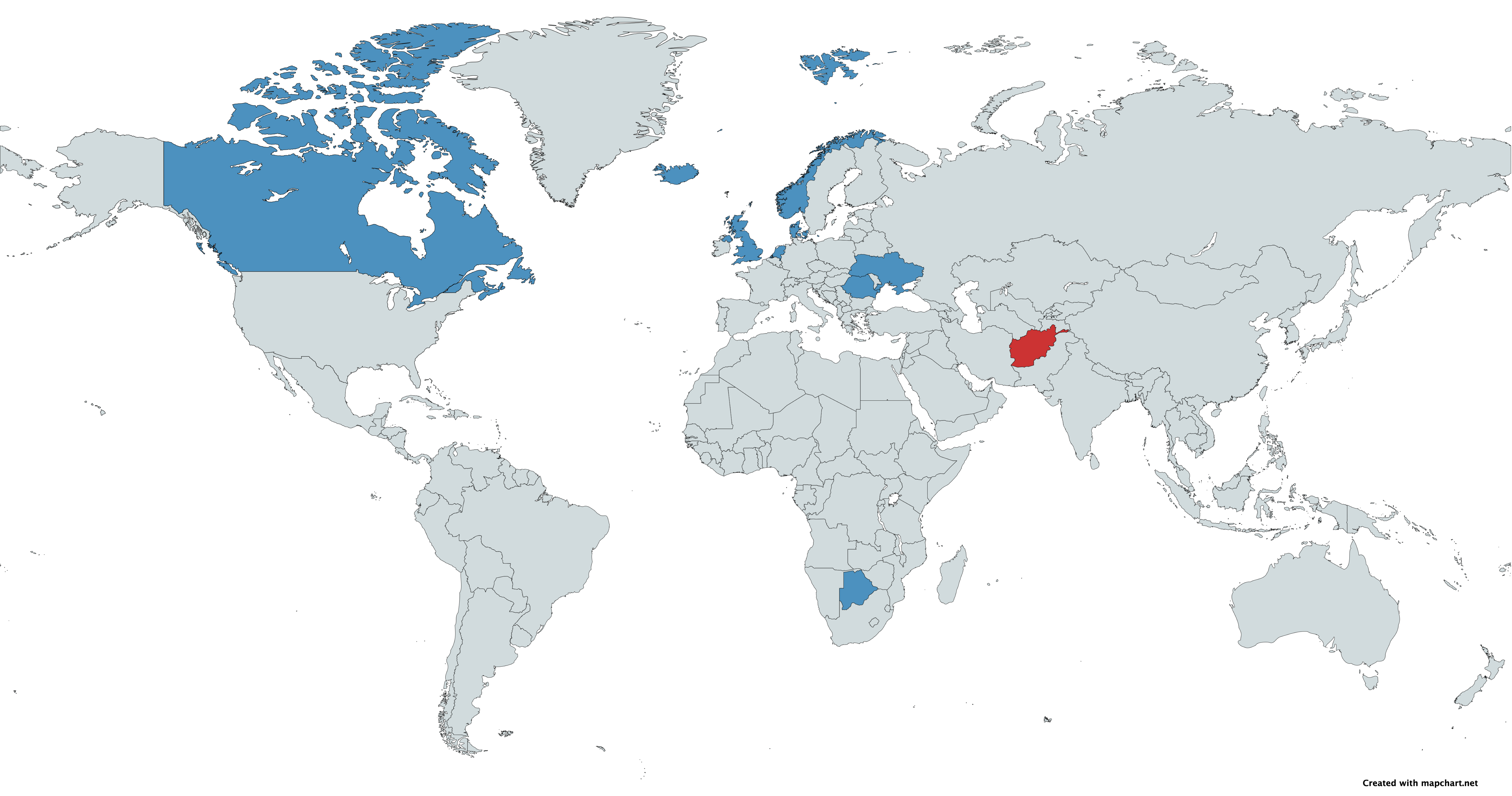
Map with C7/C8 users in blue and former users in red

- Botswana: MRR15.7M and MRR11.6S Modular Rail Rifle used by the Botswana Defence Force.
- Canada: Used by the Canadian Forces and law enforcement agencies including the Royal Canadian Mounted Police, Vancouver Police Department, Halifax Regional Police, Dryden Police, Halton ERT, the Ontario Provincial Police, Royal Newfoundland Constabulary, Sûreté du Québec, York Regional Police and Emergency Task Force (TPS). It is also used by the Correctional Service of Canada.
- Denmark The entirety of the Danish M/95 rifle family were developed on the C7/8 platform M/95 (C7), M/96 (C8), M/04 (LSW) and M/10 (C8IUR) In August 2025, contract signed to acquire C8 MMRs as the GV M/25.
- Iceland: Used by the Iceland Crisis Response Unit
- Netherlands: Used by the Military of the Netherlands.
- Norway: In use with Forsvarets Spesialkommando (Norwegian Army) and Marinejegerkommandoen (Royal Norwegian Navy). Also in use with select agencies within the Norwegian Police, including Delta, the Royal Police Escort and the Norwegian Police Security Service.
- Romania: In use with Detașamentul Special de Protecție și Intervenție
- Ukraine: Significant quantity of C7A2 were seen in the hands of Ukrainian forces during the Russian invasion of Ukraine. Some C8s/C8 SFWs used by Ukrainian SOF under the SSO. The rifles are actively being used with the Ukrainian Ground Forces, primarily with the 3rd Separate Assault Brigade and 47th Mechanized Brigade, both now part of the 3rd Army Corps. Rifles were also observed with Azov National Guard Brigade, and the Unmanned Systems Forcesʼ 14th Regiment.
- United Kingdom: C8SFW, C8IUR, and C8MRR Carbines are used by the British Army and SAS and are the standard-issues rifle of the Royal Marines under the designation of L119A1, L119A2 and L119A3. Supplemented in usage by the KS-1 since 2023 in the Royal Marines and Ranger Regiment.

=== Former user ===
- Afghanistan: Donated weapons from Canada were previously used by the Afghan National Army, but the weapons were later returned to Canada in favour of American weapons.
