= C7 Nella bayonet =

C7 bayonet of Canadian C7 rifle

C7 bayonet
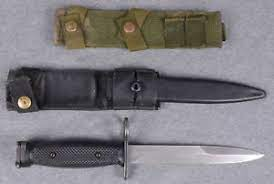
- C7 bayonet carrier (top), C7 bayonet scabbard (middle), C7 bayonet (bottom)
- Type: Bayonet
- Place of origin: Canada

Service history
- In service: 1984–2004
- Wars: UNAMIR; UNPROFOR; Operation Deliverance; British military intervention in the Sierra Leone Civil War; War in Afghanistan; Iraq War

Production history
- Designed: 1982
- Manufacturer: Nella Canada

Specifications
- Length: 295 mm (11.6 in)
- Blade length: 168 mm (6.6 in)
- Blade type: Spear point
- Scabbard/sheath: C7 scabbard

The C7 Nella bayonet is a standard issued multi-purpose infantry bayonet by the Canadian Armed Forces issued to match the serving standard issued C7/C8 variant rifles, supplied and manufactured by Nella Canada.

== Design ==
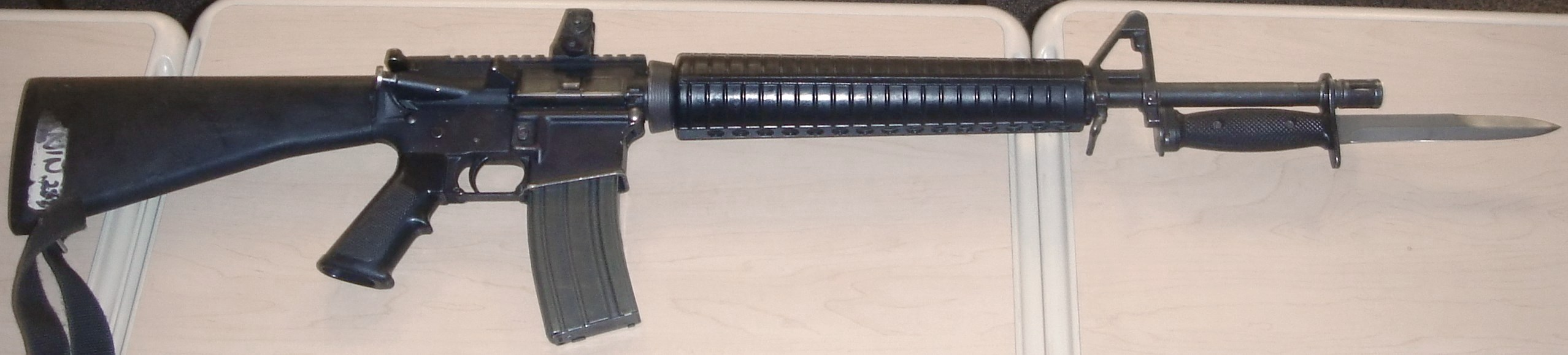
C7A1 Rifle with C7 Nella bayonet attached

The C7 Nella bayonet is a Canadian replicate of the US M7 bayonet, fitted with moulded black plastic handgrip, 295 mm (11.6 in) in total length, a muzzle ring diameter of 22.4 mm (0.88 in) with a 168 mm (6.6 in) stainless-steel spear-point-type blade.

The C7 bayonet can be fitted to standard issued C7/C8 rifle and its variants, most notably, the standard issued infantry C7A2 rifle, C8 and SFW variants of C7 type rifles.

== Adoption ==
There is no major significant difference between the C1 bayonet and C7 bayonet, but the change of standard issued rifles is critical to the development for the C7 bayonet.

This is demonstrated by the British Army and their change of standard service rifle and military tactics as well as their designation for the roles of regular infantry combatants, and the cartridge number-to-weight problem on rifle cartridges of 5.56×45mm versus 7.62×51mm was part of the factor as well.

Hence, the change of C1A1 service rifle meant the standard-issue C1 bayonet is also in need of change, since the change of C1A1 to C7 rifle would also mean the change of related essential utilities, such as the bayonet.

The C7 bayonet was designed to replace the outdated C1 bayonet and X2E1 bayonet, after the change of standard issued rifle from C1A1 rifle to C7 rifles by the Canadian Armed Forces.

By 2004, the C7 bayonet was replaced by CAN bayonet 2000, ending its service record.

== Users ==
- Canada
  - Canadian Armed Forces

== See also ==
- M9 bayonet
- C1A1 rifle
- Colt M16A3 rifle
- List of equipment of the Canadian Army
