= Firearm =

Gun for an individual

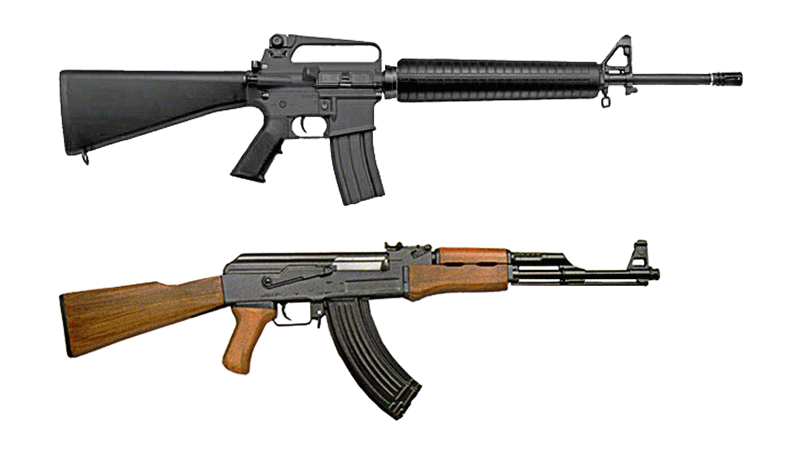
The M16 rifle and the AK-47, two common firearms with significant influences on firearm design

A firearm is any type of gun that shoots projectiles using high explosive pressure generated from combustion (deflagration) of chemical propellant, most often black powder in antique firearms and smokeless powder in modern firearms. Small arms is a subset of light firearms that is designed to be readily carried and operated by an individual. The term "firearm" is however variably defined both technically and legally in different countries (see legal definitions), and can be used colloquially (sometimes incorrectly) to refer to any type of guns including air guns.

The first firearms originated in 10th-century Song dynasty China (see gunpowder weapons in the Song dynasty), when bamboo tubes containing gunpowder and pellet projectiles were mounted on spears to make the portable fire lance, which was operable by a single person and was later used effectively as a shock weapon in the siege of De'an in 1132. In the 13th century, fire lance barrels were replaced with metal tubes and transformed into the metal-barreled hand cannon, and the technology gradually spread throughout Eurasia during the 14th century, but there is little information regarding how this spread occurred. Older firearms typically used black powder as a propellant. Beginning in the 1860s, black powder was gradually replaced by smokeless powder, which is mostly based on nitrocellulose. In contrast to black powder, it produces almost entirely gas upon combustion, earning it the title "smokeless powder." Most modern firearms (with the notable exception of smoothbore shotguns) have rifled barrels to impart a stabilizing spin to the bullet for improved external ballistics.

Modern firearms can be described by their caliber (i.e. bore diameter). For handguns and rifles this is given in millimeters or inches (e.g. 7.62mm or .308 in.); in the case of shotguns, gauge or bore (e.g. 12 ga. or .410 bore.). They are also described by the type of action employed (single-shot vs. repeating, e.g. muzzleloader, breechloader, lever, bolt, pump, revolver, semi-automatic, fully automatic, etc.), together with the usual means of deportment (i.e. handheld or mounted). Further classification may make reference to the type of barrel bore used (i.e. rifled vs smoothbore) and to the barrel length (e.g. 24 inches), to the firing mechanism (e.g. matchlock, flintlock, wheellock, caplock or primer-ignited such as needlefire, pinfire, teat-fire, rimfire and centerfire, as well as the atypical electronic firing), to the design's primary intended use (e.g. hunting rifle, service rifle), or to the commonly accepted name for a particular variation (e.g. Gatling gun).

Shooters aim firearms at their targets with hand-eye coordination, using either iron sights or optical sights such as scope, red dot or holographic sights. The effective range of handguns and shotguns generally does not exceed 100 metres (110 yd; 330 ft), while most rifles are accurate to 500 metres (550 yd; 1,600 ft) using iron sights, or to longer ranges whilst using optical sights. Purpose-built sniper rifles and anti-materiel rifles are accurate to ranges of more than 2,000 metres (2,200 yd). Firearm rounds may be dangerous or lethal well beyond their accurate range; the minimum distance for safety is much greater than the specified range for accuracy.

== Types ==
A firearm is a barreled weapon that inflicts damage on targets by launching one or more projectiles driven by rapidly expanding high-pressure gas produced by exothermic combustion (deflagration) of a chemical propellant, historically black powder, now smokeless powder.

In the military, firearms are categorized into heavy and light weapons by their portability. Light firearms are those that can be readily carried by individual foot soldier, though they might require more than one individual (i.e. crew-served) to achieve optimal operational capacity. Heavy firearms are those that are too large and heavy to be transported on foot, or too unstable against recoil, and thus require the support of a weapons platform (e.g. a fixed mount, wheeled carriage, vehicle, aircraft or water vessel) to be tactically mobile or useful.

The subset of light firearms that only use kinetic projectiles and are compact enough to be operated to full capacity by a single infantryman (individual-served) are also referred to as small arms. Such firearms include handguns such as pistols, revolvers, and derringers; and long guns such as rifles (and their subtypes), shotguns, submachine guns, and light machine guns.

Among the world's arms manufacturers, the latest data from 2023 released by the Bureau of Alcohol, Tobacco, Firearms, and Explosives shows the top 30 firearms manufacturers in the United States are (in order of number of firearms manufactured): Ruger, SIG Sauer, Smith & Wesson, Savage Arms, Palmetto State Armory, Henry, Mossberg, Glock, Anderson Manufacturing (acquired by Ruger in 2025), Springfield Armory, Aero Precision, Heritage Manufacturing (owned by Taurus), Colt, KelTec, Kimber, FN, Beretta, Remington, Diamondback Firearms, Radical Firearms, Legacy Sports International, SCCY Firearms, Taurus, North American Arms, American Tactical, Shadow Systems, Browning, Daniel Defense, Wilson Combat, and Staccato 2011. Some of the world's largest firearm manufacturers outside the United States include Glock (Austria), Heckler & Koch (Germany), SIG Sauer (Germany/Switzerland), CZ (Czech Republic), Beretta (Italy), FN (Belgium), Taurus (Brazil), Norinco (China), Steyr Arms (Austria), Kalashnikov (Russia), Tokarev (Russia), and Miroku (Japan).

As of 2018 the Small Arms Survey reported that there were over one billion firearms distributed globally, of which 857 million (about 85 percent) were in civilian hands. U.S. civilians alone account for 393 million (about 46 percent) of the worldwide total of civilian-held firearms, as of 2026 the number of civilian-held firearms is estimated to be as much as 500 million. This amounts to "120.5 firearms for every 100 residents", which increased to 150 guns per 100 residents by 2026. The world's armed forces control about 133 million (about 13 percent) of the global total of small arms, of which over 43 percent belong to two countries: the Russian Federation (30.3 million) and China (27.5 million). Law enforcement agencies control about 23 million (about 2 percent) of the global total of small arms.

=== Handguns ===
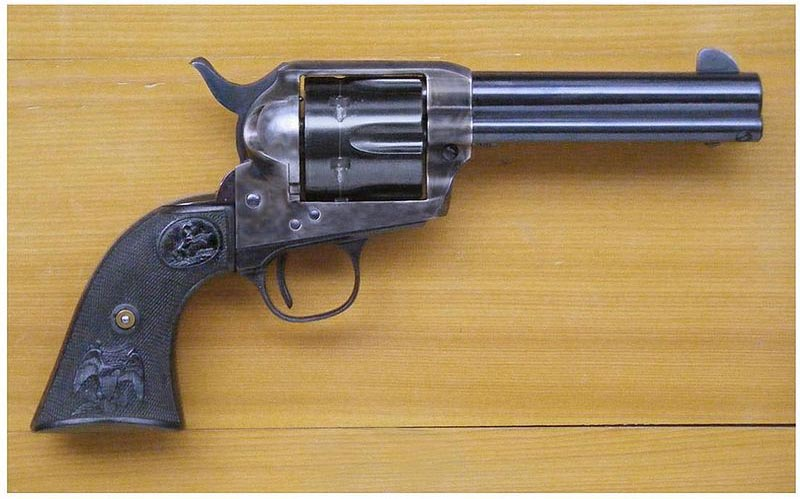
The Colt Single Action Army, a revolver chambered in .45 Colt

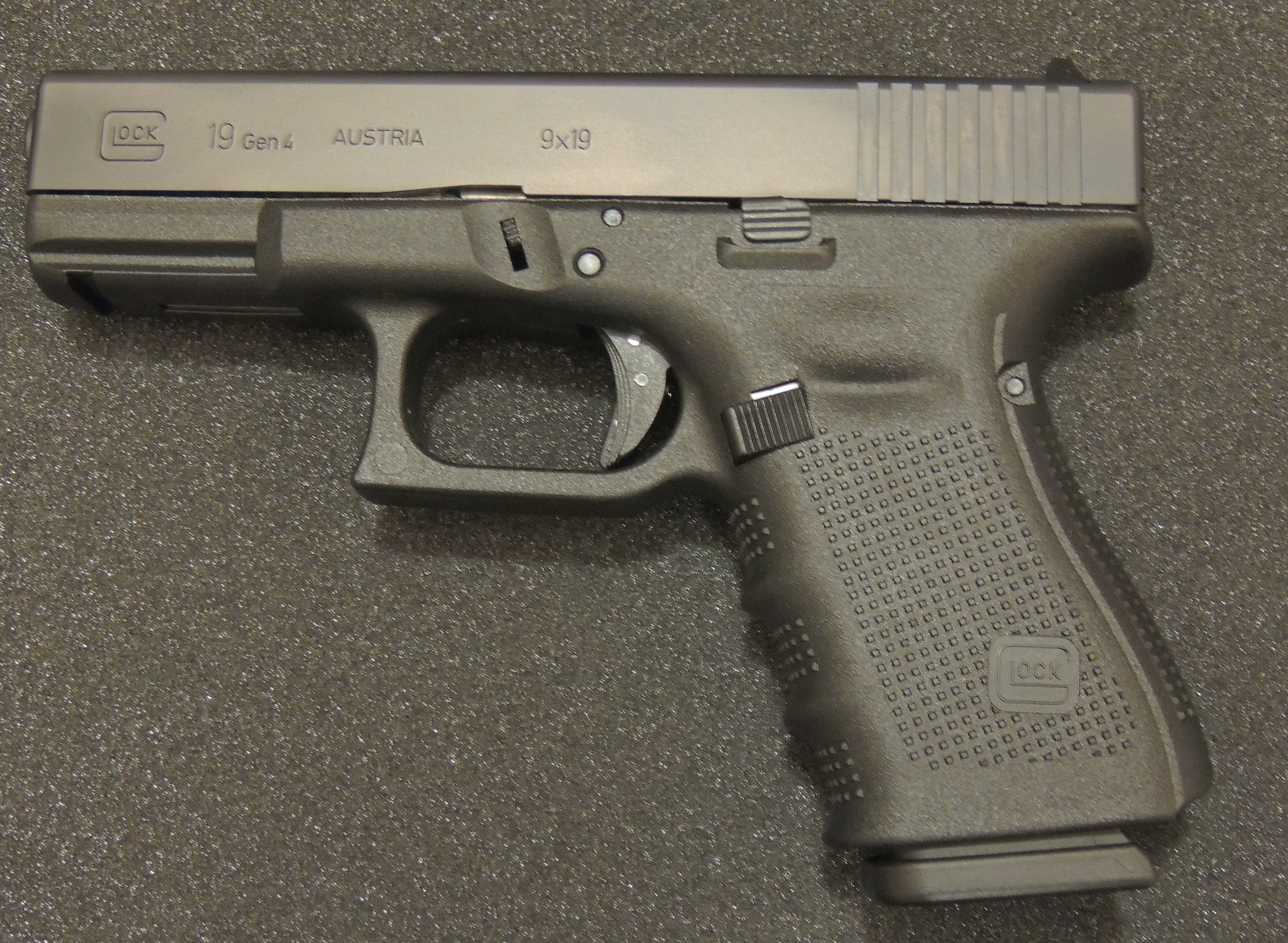
The Glock 19, a pistol chambered in 9×19mm Parabellum

A handgun is, as defined generally and in many gun laws, a firearm that can be used with a single hand. They are the smallest of all firearms, and are common as sidearms, concealed carry weapons, or as backup weapons for self-defense.

Handguns can be categorized into two broad types: pistols, which have a single fixed firing chamber machined into the rear of the barrel, and are often loaded using magazines of varying capacities; revolvers, which have a number of firing chambers or "charge holes" in a revolving cylinder, each one loaded with a single cartridge or charge; and derringers, broadly defined as any handgun that is not a traditional pistol nor a revolver, typically they are a small, pocket-sized pistol designed for easy concealment, featuring one or two barrels without a repeating mechanism being loaded either via the muzzle or breech.

There are various types of the aforementioned handguns designed for different mechanisms or purposes, such as single-shot, manual repeating, semi-automatic, or automatic pistols; single-action, double-action, or double-action/single-action revolvers; and small, compact handguns for concealed carry such as pocket pistols and "Saturday night specials".

Examples of pistols include Glocks, Browning Hi-Power, M1911 pistol, Makarov pistol, Walther PP, Luger pistol, Mauser C96, and Beretta 92. Examples of revolvers include the Colt Single Action Army, Smith & Wesson Model 10, Colt Official Police, Colt Python, New Nambu M60, and Mateba Autorevolver. Examples of derringers include the Remington Model 95, FP-45 Liberator, and COP .357 Derringer.

=== Long guns ===
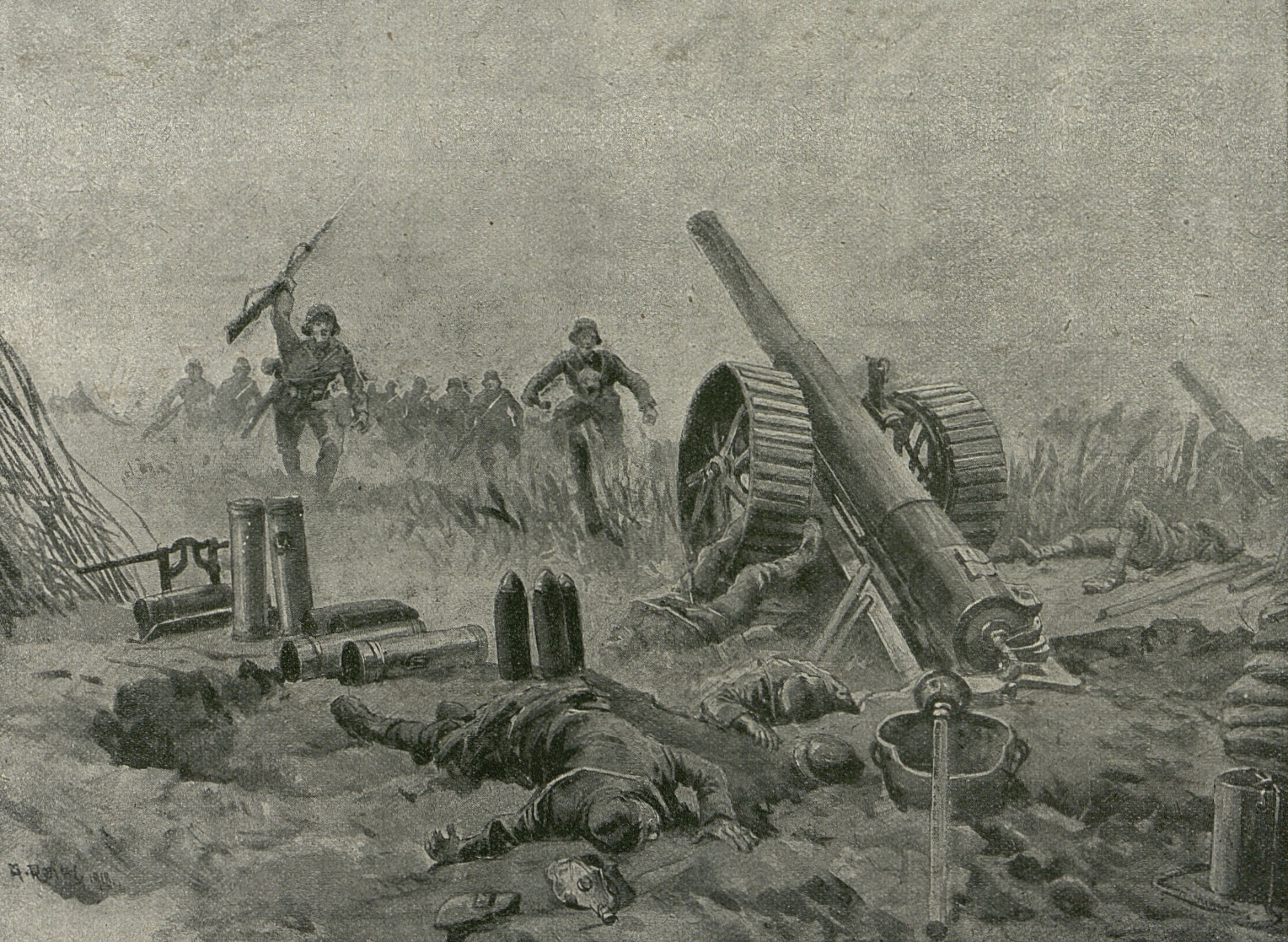
Capture of English long-barreled guns in the breakthrough battle at Bapaume, March 1918

A long gun is any firearm with a notably long barrel, typically a length of 10 to 30 inches (250 to 760 mm) (there are restrictions on minimum barrel length in many jurisdictions; maximum barrel length is usually a matter of practicality). Unlike a handgun, long guns are designed to be held and fired with both hands, while braced against the shoulder for better stability. The receiver and trigger group is mounted into a stock made of wood, plastic, metal, or composite material, which has sections that form a foregrip, rear grip, and optionally (but typically) a shoulder mount called the butt. Early long arms, from the Renaissance up to the mid-19th century, were generally smoothbore firearms that fired one or more ball shot, called muskets or arquebuses depending on caliber and firing mechanism. Since the 19th and 20th centuries, various types of long guns have been created for different purposes.

==== Rifles ====
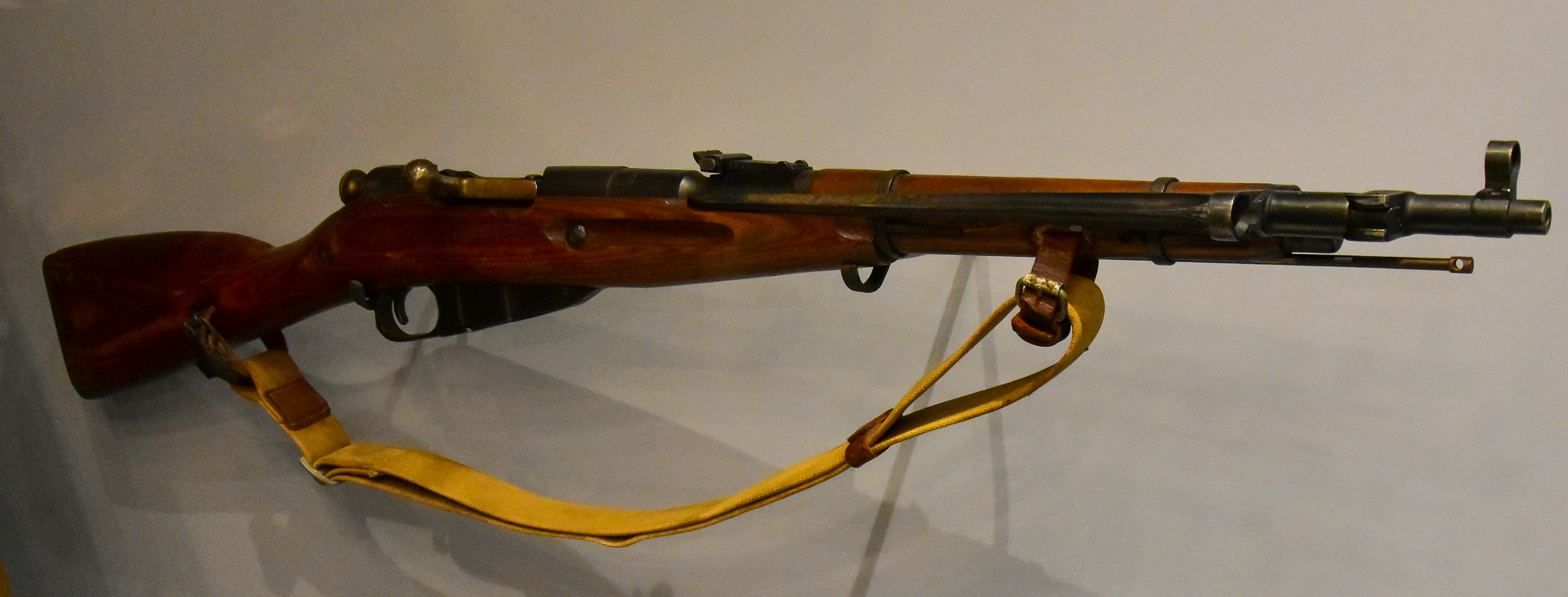
The Mosin–Nagant, a rifle chambered in 7.62×54mmR

A rifle is a long gun that has riflings (spiral grooves) machined into the bore (inner) surface of its barrel, imparting a gyroscopically stabilizing spin to the bullets that it fires. A descendant of the musket, rifles produce a single point of impact with each firing with a long range and high accuracy. For this reason, as well as for their ubiquity, rifles are very popular among militaries as service rifles, police as accurate long-range alternatives to their traditional shotgun long guns, and civilians for hunting, shooting sports, and self-defense.

Many types of rifles exist owing to their wide adoption and versatility, ranging from mere barrel length differences as in short-barreled rifles and carbines, to classifications per the rifle's function and purpose as in semi-automatic rifles, automatic rifles and sniper rifles, to differences in the rifle's action as in falling block, rolling block, single-shot, break-action, bolt-action, and lever-action rifles.

Examples of rifles of various types include the Henry rifle, Winchester Model 94, Winchester Model 70, Lee–Enfield, Gewehr 98, M1 Garand, AK-type, AR-15, Ruger 10/22, Ruger M77, Ruger Mini-14, Heckler & Koch G3, Remington Model 700, Remington Model 7600, and Heckler & Koch HK417.

==== Shotguns ====
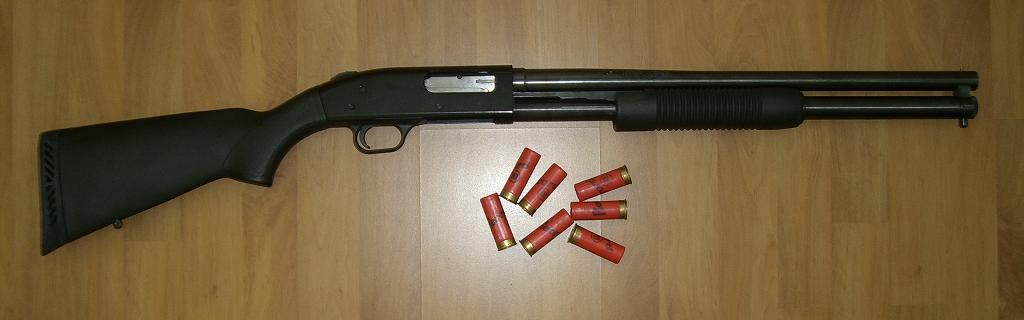
The Mossberg 500, a shotgun chambered in 12-gauge

A shotgun is a long gun that has a predominantly smoothbore barrel—meaning it lacks rifling—designed to fire a number of shot pellets in each discharge. These shot pellet sizes commonly range between 2 mm #9 birdshot and 8.4 mm #00 (double-aught) buckshot, and produce a cluster of impact points with considerably less range and accuracy compared to a rifle, since shot spreads during flight. Shotguns are also capable of firing single solid projectiles called slugs (typically used for hunting large animals), or specialty (often "less lethal") munitions such as bean bags or tear gas to function as a riot gun, or breaching rounds to function as a door breaching shotgun. Shotgun munitions, regardless of type, are packed into shotgun shells (cartridges designed specifically for shotguns) that are loaded into the shotgun for use; these shells are commonly loose and manually loaded one-by-one, though some shotguns accept magazines.

Shotguns share many qualities with rifles, such as both being descendants of early long guns such as the musket; both having single-shot, break-action, bolt-action, lever-action, pump-action, semi-automatic, and automatic variants; and both being popular with military, police, and civilians for largely the same reasons. However, unlike rifles, shotguns are less favored in combat roles due to their low accuracy and limited effectiveness in modern warfare, with combat shotguns often only used for breaching, or close-quarters combat situations like jungle warfare, trench warfare, or clearing buildings during urban warfare; for versatility underbarrel attachments such as the M26 Modular Accessory Shotgun System are popular in the military, as they allow a soldier to wield a shotgun and an assault rifle simultaneously. Shotguns are still popular with civilians for the suitability of their shot spread in hunting, clay pigeon shooting, and home defense.

Double-barreled shotguns are break-action shotguns with two parallel barrels (horizontal side-by-side or vertical over-and-under), allowing two single shots that can be loaded and fired in quick succession.

Examples of shotguns include the Winchester Model 1897, Winchester SXP, Browning Auto-5, Ithaca 37, Remington Model 870, Mossberg 500, Benelli M4, Franchi SPAS-12, Atchisson AA-12.

==== Carbines ====
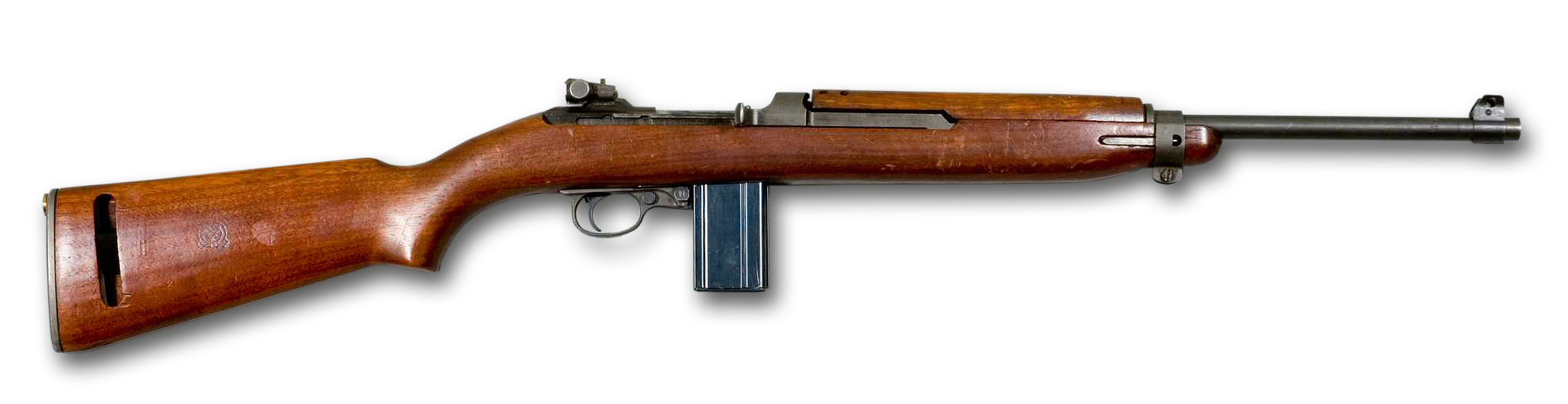
The M1 carbine, a uniquely-designed carbine, chambered in .30 carbine

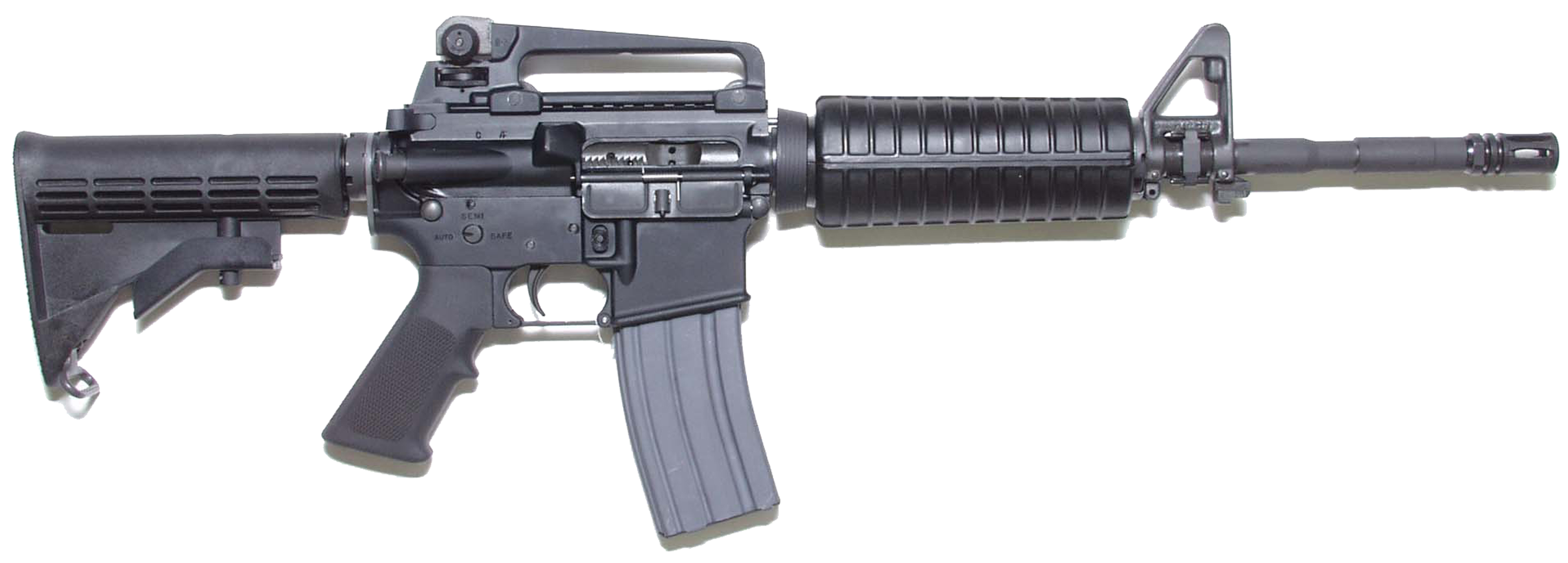
The M4 carbine, a carbine derivative of the M16 rifle, chambered in 5.56×45mm NATO

The traditional definition of a carbine was a shortened version of an existing rifle, the term is derived from the French word for rifleman, “carabinier”. A carbine was originally defined as a rifle with a barrel under 22 inches (56 cm), which was shorter than the common military rifle barrel lengths of 23 in (58 cm) to 26 in (66 cm) from the late 18th-early 20th centuries. One of the first carbines to be used by the United States Army was the Spencer carbine adopted in 1860, it had a 22 inch barrel and was designed to be more quickly drawn from a saddle scabbard. During the late 19th and early 20th century, U.S. Army Cavalry carried carbine conversions of lever action rifles like the Winchester Model 1873 Carbine, which had the standard 26 in (66 cm) barrel shortened to 20 in (51 cm). The definition of a carbine evolved and changed somewhat in the 20th century, especially in the United States after the passage of the National Firearms Act (NFA) in 1934. The NFA created the term short-barreled rifle (SBR), which is defined as a rifle with a barrel length under 16 in (41 cm) or with an overall length under 26 in (66 cm), under the NFA possession of an SBR is a class D felony unless the ATF issues a type of permit known as a NFA tax stamp. This led the international firearms industry (for the most part) to adopt the definition of a carbine as being any rifle with a barrel length under 20 in (51 cm), and in the U.S. carbine has come to mean any rifle with a barrel length between 20-16 inches, and while rifles with barrels under 16 inches are still defined as a carbine, they're usually called an SBR for clarification. Not all carbines are shortened versions of existing rifles, for example the M1 carbine was designed with a 17.75 in (45.1 cm) barrel and Ruger Mini-14 models have either 18.5 in (47 cm) or 16.1 in (41 cm) barrels. Carbines are regardless very similar to rifles and often have the same actions (single-shot, lever-action, bolt-action, semi-automatic, automatic, etc.).

The small size of a carbine provides lighter weight and better maneuverability, making them ideal for close-quarters combat and storage in compact areas. This makes them popular firearms among special forces and police tactical units alongside submachine guns, considerably so since the late 1990s due to the familiarity and better stopping power of carbines compared to submachine guns. They are also popular with (and were originally mostly intended for) military personnel in roles that are expected to engage in combat, but where a full-size rifle would be an impediment to the primary duties of that soldier (logistical personnel, airborne forces, military engineers, officers, etc.), though since the turn of the millennium these have been superseded to a degree in some roles by personal defense weapons. Carbines are also common among civilian firearm owners who have size, space, and power concerns similar to military and police users.

Examples of carbines include the Winchester Model 1892, Rifle No. 5 Mk I, SKS, M1 carbine, Ruger Mini-14, M4 carbine, Colt AR-15, and Kel-Tec SUB-2000.

==== Assault rifles ====
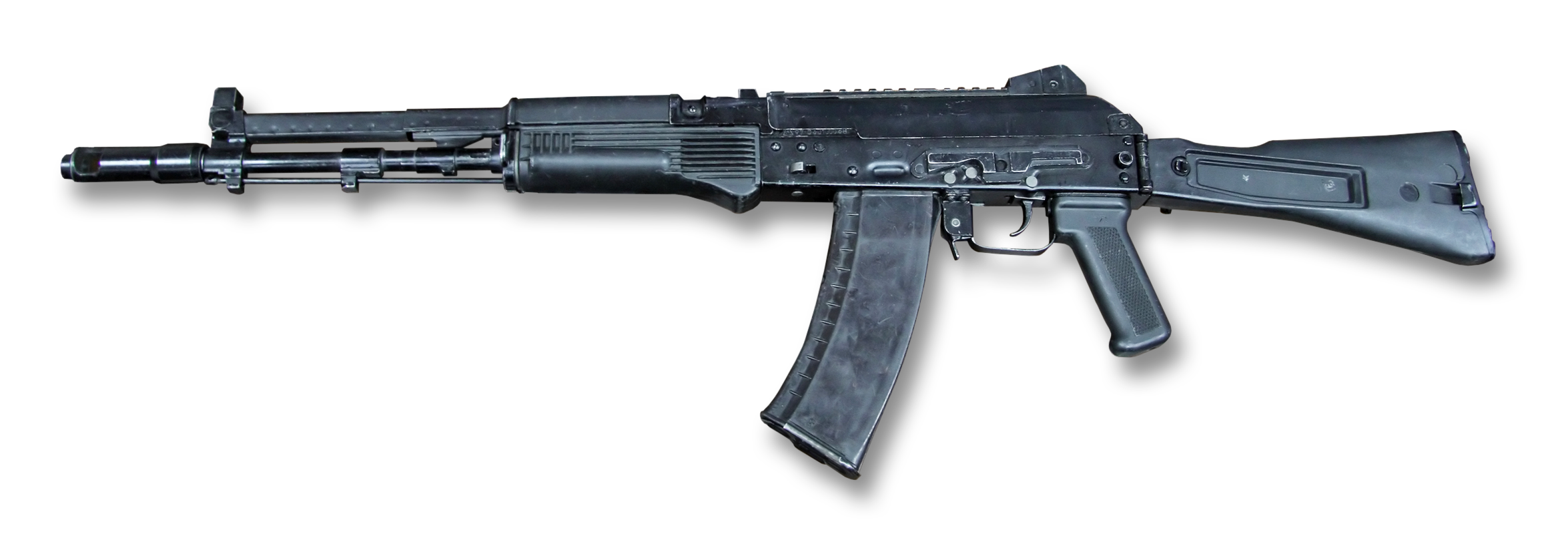
The AK-107, an assault rifle chambered in 5.45×39mm

An assault rifle is commonly defined as a selective-fire rifle chambered in an intermediate cartridge (such as 5.56×45mm NATO, 7.62×39mm, 5.45×39mm, and .300 AAC Blackout) and fed with a detachable magazine. Assault rifles are also usually smaller than full-sized rifles such as battle rifles.

Originating with the StG 44 produced by Nazi Germany during World War II, assault rifles have since become extremely popular among militaries and other armed groups due to their universal versatility, and they have made up the vast majority of standard-issue military service rifles since the mid-20th century. Various configurations of assault rifle exist, such as the bullpup, in which the firing grip is located in front of the breech instead of behind it.

Examples of assault rifles include Kalashnikov rifle(such as the AK-47, AKM, and AK-74), the American M16 rifle and its M4 carbine variant, the Austrian Steyr AUG, the Belgian FN FAL and FNC, and the German Heckler & Koch G36.

==== Battle rifles ====
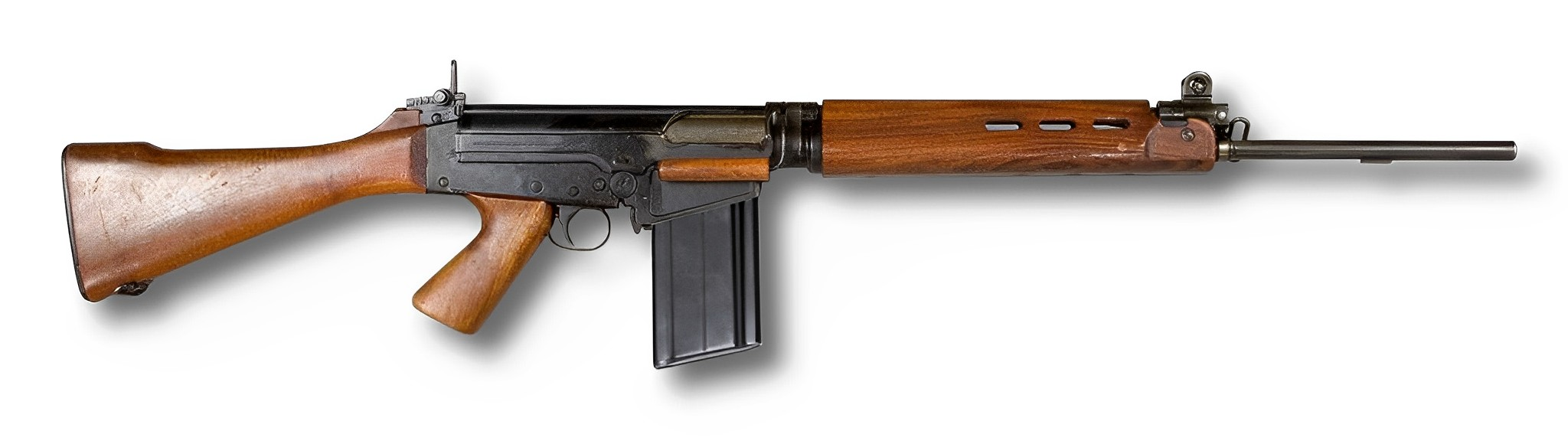
The FN FAL, a battle rifle chambered in 7.62×51mm NATO

A battle rifle is commonly defined as a semi-automatic or selective-fire rifle that is larger or longer than an assault rifle and is chambered in a "full-power" cartridge (e.g. 7.62×51mm NATO, 7.92×57mm Mauser, 7.62×54mmR, 6.8x51mm). The term originated as a retronym to differentiate older full-powered rifles of these configurations like the M1 Garand and M14, from newer assault rifles using intermediate cartridges like the Heckler & Koch HK33 and M16, but it is sometimes used to describe similar modern rifles such as the FN SCAR.

Battle rifles serve similar purposes as assault rifles, as they both are usually employed by ground infantry for essentially the same purposes. However, some prefer battle rifles for their more powerful cartridge, despite the added recoil. Some designated marksman rifles are configured from battle rifles, such as the Mk 14 Enhanced Battle Rifle and United States Marine Corps Designated Marksman Rifle, both essentially heavily modified and modernized variants of the M14 rifle.

Examples of rifles considered to be battle rifles include the M1 Garand, M14, AR-10, FG 42, Gewehr 43, FN FAL, FN SCAR, SIG MCX Spear, Howa Type 64, and AK-308.

==== Sniper rifles ====
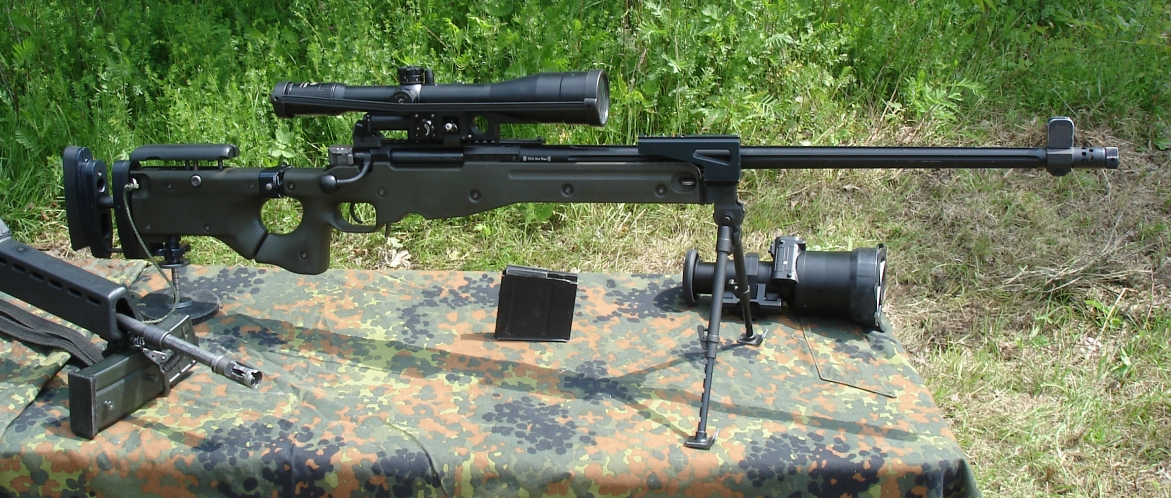
The Accuracy International Arctic Warfare, a sniper rifle chambered in 7.62×51mm NATO and .308 Winchester

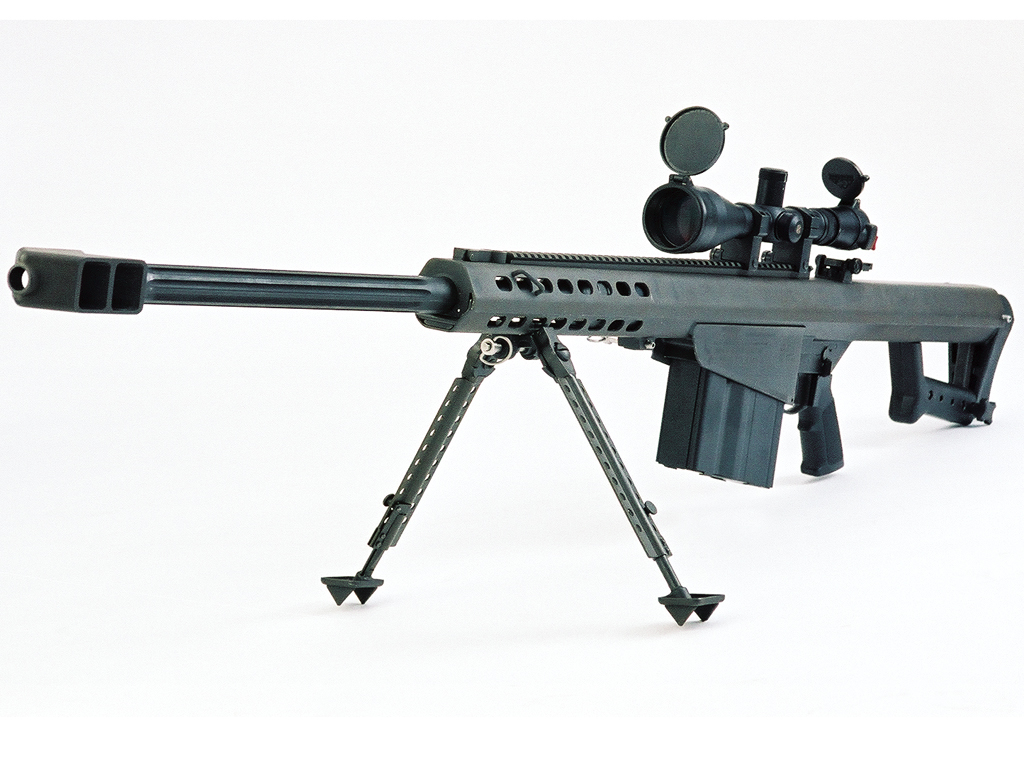
The Barrett M82, an anti-materiel rifle chambered in .50 BMG

A sniper rifle is, per widespread definition, a high-powered precision rifle, often bolt-action or semi-automatic, with an effective range beyond that of a standard rifle, typically beyond 300 metres (330 yd). Though any rifle in a sniper configuration (usually with a telescopic sight and bipod) can be considered a sniper rifle, most sniper rifles are purpose-built for their applications, or are variants of existing rifles that have been modified to function as sniper rifles, such as the M1903A1/Unertl, which was the United States Marine Corps sniper rifle configuration of the M1903 Springfield; or the Type 97 sniper rifle used by the Imperial Japanese Army, which was essentially a standard Type 38 rifle that was modified to be lighter and come with a telescopic sight.

Related developments are anti-materiel rifles, large-caliber rifles typically between 12.7 mm (0.50 in) to 14.5 mm (0.57 in) (sometimes larger)-i.e. .50 BMG (12.7x99mm NATO), 12.7 × 108 mm, 20x102mm-in calibers designed to destroy enemy materiel such as vehicles, supplies, or hardware; anti-material rifles are also used as extreme long-range sniper rifles for distances of 1,000 metres (1,100 yd) to 2,000 m (2,200 yd). Anti-tank rifles are anti-materiel rifles that were designed specifically to combat early armored fighting vehicles, but are now largely obsolete due to advances in vehicle armour. Scout sniper rifles are a broad class of rifles generally summed up as short, lightweight, portable sniper rifles used by Scout Snipers. A designated marksman rifle is a semi-automatic high-precision rifle, they're usually chambered in intermediate or full-power cartridges like the 7.62x51mm NATO, and are designed to fill the range gap between sniper rifles and regular infantry rifles, they are designed for engagements beyond 300 yards (270 m) with a maximum range of 800 yards (730 m), and are wielded by designated marksmen.

Examples of sniper and scout rifles include the M40 rifle, Heckler & Koch PSG1, Walther WA 2000, Accuracy International AWM, M24 Sniper Weapon System, Mk 22 MOD 0 Advanced Sniper Rifle, Steyr Scout, Sako TRG, and CheyTac Intervention. Examples of anti-materiel and anti-tank rifles include the Mauser Tankgewehr M1918, Boys anti-tank rifle, Lahti L-39, PTRS-41, Barrett M82, Gepárd anti-materiel rifle, McMillan TAC-50, and Anzio 20mm rifle. Examples of designated marksman rifles include the SVD, SR-25, Dragunov SVU, Marine Scout Sniper Rifle, Mk 14 Enhanced Battle Rifle, M110 Semi-Automatic Sniper System, and M110A1 Compact Semi-Automatic Sniper System.

==== Automatic rifles ====
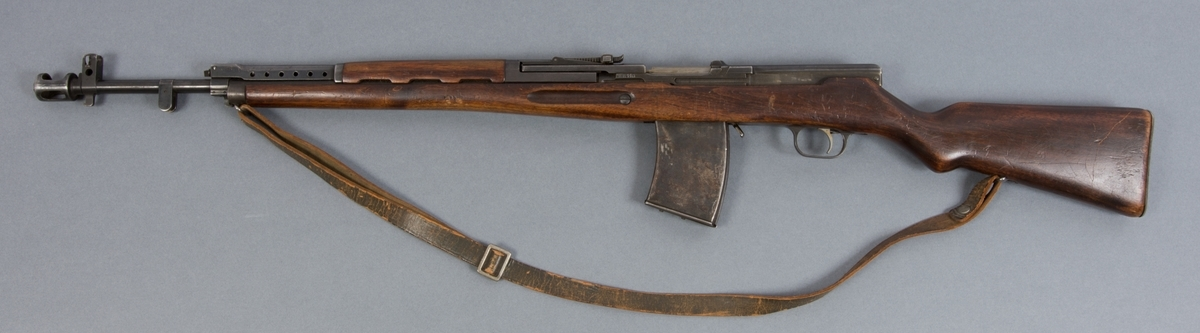
The AVS-36, an automatic rifle chambered in 7.62×54mmR

An automatic rifle is a magazine-fed rifle that is capable of automatic fire, including both burst fire rifles like the M16A4 & M4 which fire 3-round bursts with each trigger pull, and full auto rifles like the M16 & M4A1 which fire as long as the trigger is held down. They include most assault rifles and battle rifles, but originated as their own category of rifles capable of automatic fire, as opposed to the bolt-action and semi-automatic rifles commonly issued to infantry at the time of their invention in the early 20th century. They usually have smaller magazine capacities than machine guns; the French Chauchat had a 20-round box magazine and the U.S. M16 has a 30-round detachable magazine, while the Hotchkiss Mle 1914 machine gun, the French Army's standard machine gun at the time, was fed by a 250-round ammunition belt.

Though automatic rifles are sometimes considered to be their own category, they are also occasionally considered to be other types of firearms that postdated their invention, usually as light machine guns. Automatic rifles are sometimes confused with machine guns or vice versa, or are defined as such by law; the National Firearms Act (NFA) and Title II of the Gun Control Act of 1968 (GCA) define a "machine gun" in 26 United States Code § 5845(b) as "... any firearm which shoots ... automatically more than one shot, without manual reloading, by a single function of the trigger". "Machine gun" is therefore largely synonymous with "automatic weapon" in American civilian parlance, covering all automatic firearms. In most jurisdictions, automatic rifles, as well as automatic firearms in general, are prohibited from civilian purchase or are at least heavily restricted. In the U.S. for instance, most automatic rifles are Title II weapons under the NFA & GCA that are heavily regulated and require prior approval from the ATF, a special permit, and payment of a $200 tax; in addition the Hughes Act of 1986, codified at 18 U.S.C. § 922(o), banned the transfer and possession of machine guns to civilians with the exception of machine guns registered prior to July 1, 1986, which is why civilian-legal machine guns in the U.S. are incredibly expensive.

Examples of automatic rifles include the Cei-Rigotti, Lewis gun, Fedorov Avtomat, M1918 Browning automatic rifle, AK-47, M16, M4 carbine, and H&K 416.

==== Submachine guns ====
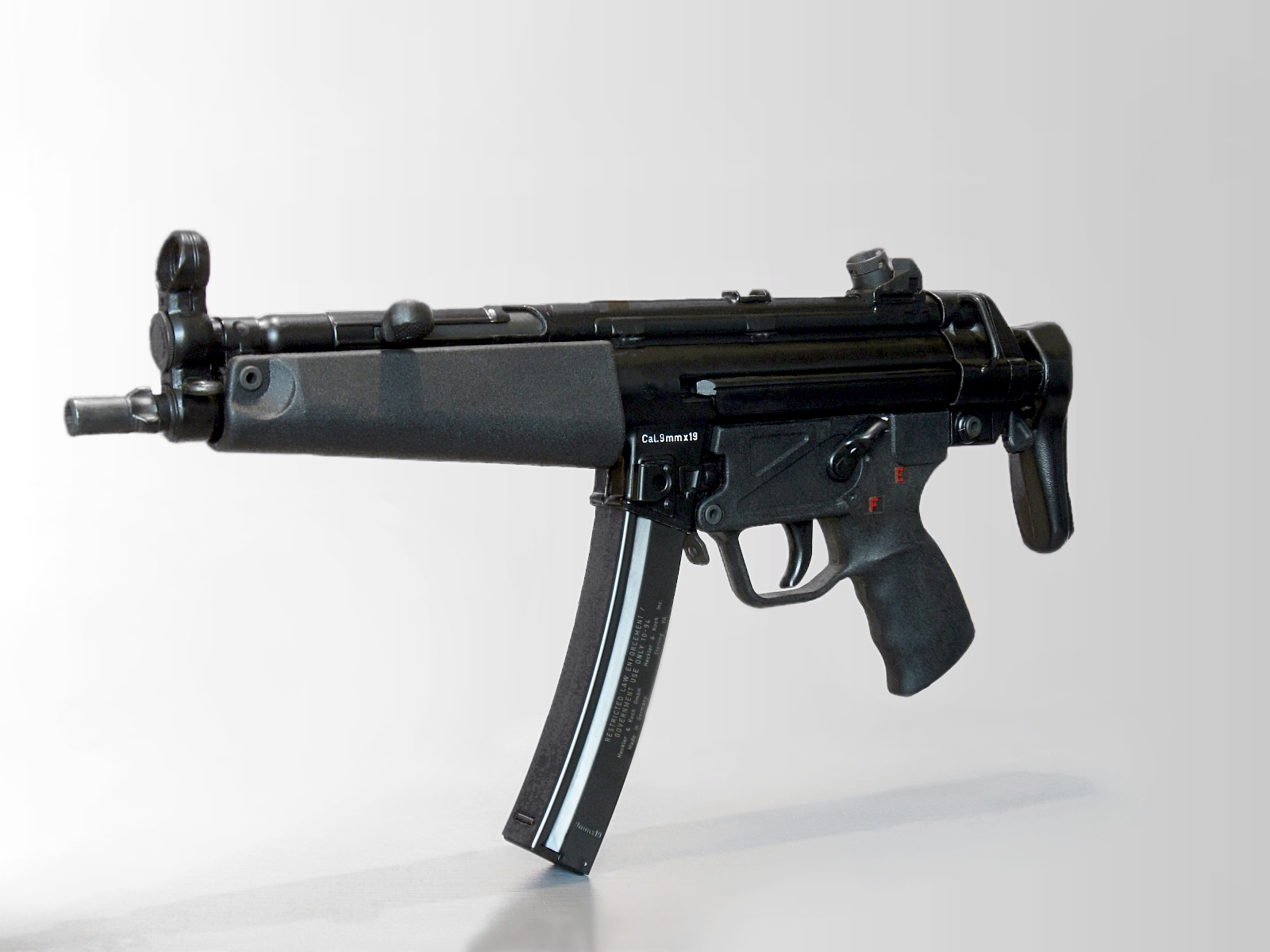
The Heckler & Koch MP5, a submachine gun chambered in 9×19mm Parabellum

A submachine gun is a magazine-fed carbine chambered in a small-caliber handgun cartridge (such as 9×19mm Parabellum, .45 ACP, .22 Long Rifle, and .40 S&W). They cannot be considered machine guns due to their small-caliber, hence the prefix "sub-" to differentiate them from proper machine guns. Submachine guns are commonly associated with high rates of fire, automatic fire capabilities, and low recoil, though many submachine guns differentiate from this in various ways, such as having fairly low rates of fire or including burst and semi-automatic modes available through selective fire. Most submachine guns are the size of carbines and short-barreled rifles, and use similar configurations. Many are designed to take as little space as possible for use in close-quarters or for easy storage in vehicles and cases. Some submachine guns are designed and configured similar to pistols even down to size, and are thus occasionally classed as machine pistols, even if they are not actually a handgun (i.e. designed to require two hands to use).

Submachine guns are considered ideal for close-quarters combat and are cheap to mass-produce. They were very common in military service through much of the 20th century, but have since been superseded in most combat roles by rifles, carbines, and personal defense weapons due to their low effective range and poor penetration against most body armor developed since the late 20th century. However, they remain popular among special forces and police for their effectiveness in close-quarters and low likelihood to overpenetrate targets.

Examples of submachine guns include the MP 18, MP 40, Thompson submachine gun, M3 submachine gun, Uzi, Heckler & Koch MP5, Spectre M4, Steyr TMP, Heckler & Koch UMP, PP-2000, KRISS Vector, and SIG MPX.

==== Personal defense weapons ====
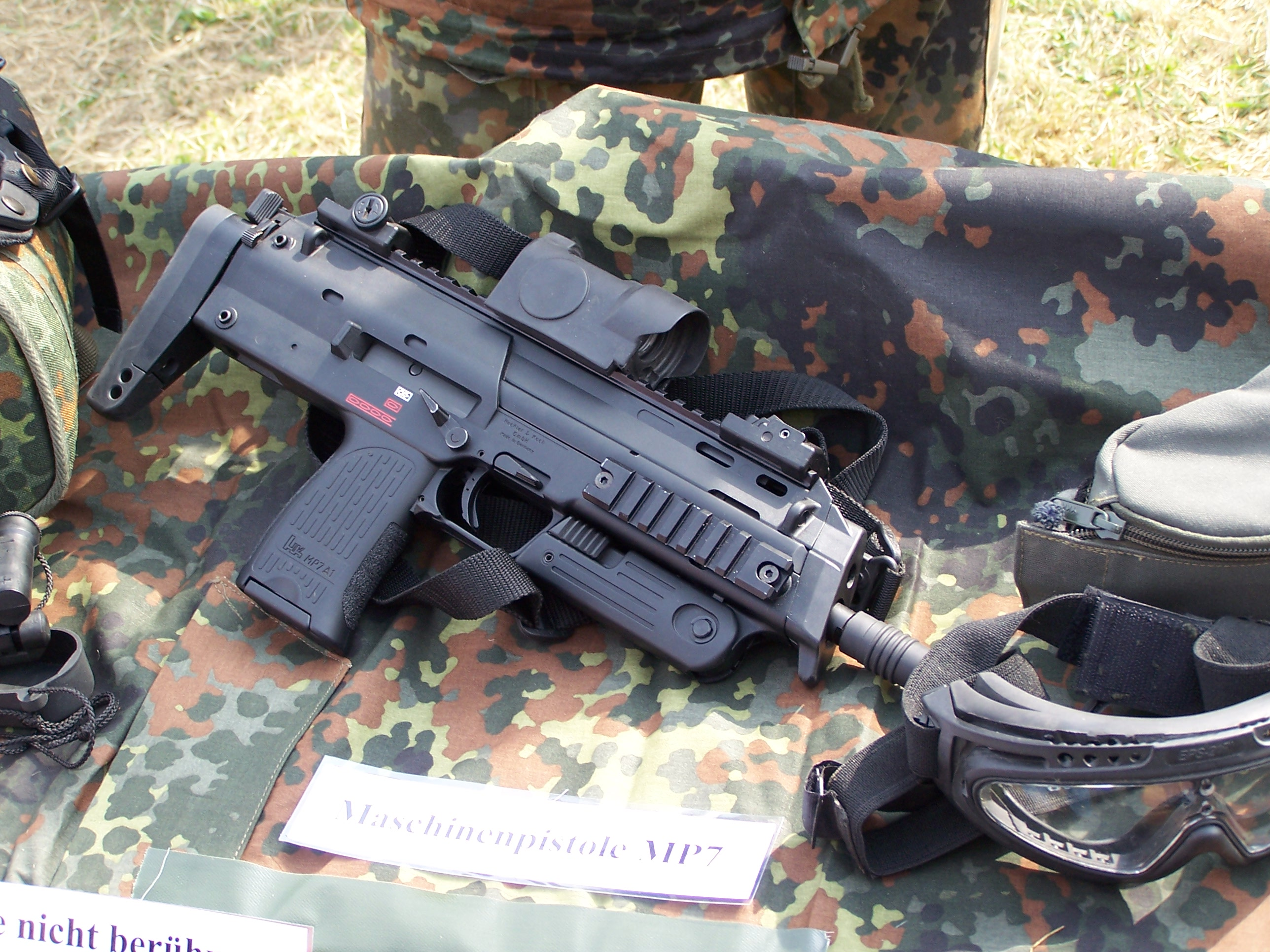
The Heckler & Koch MP7, a personal defense weapon chambered in HK 4.6×30mm

A personal defense weapon (PDW) is a light-weight, short, collapsible, folding rifle or submachine gun, chambered in either intermediate or rifle rounds, designed specifically for close-quarters protection. A PDW is more compact than a rifle, but is more effective than a handgun at intermediate ranges around 100 yards (91 m) to 200 yd (180 m), and are capable of holding more ammunition than a handgun. Examples of automatic PDWs used by military and law enforcement are the FN P90 chambered in the 5.7×28mm intermediate cartridge, and the Heckler & Koch MP7 chambered for the HK 4.6×30mm armor-piercing cartridge. An example of a semi-automatic civilian-legal PDW would be an AR pistol, which are essentially short-barreled AR-15s with an overall length under 26 in (66 cm) that use an arm brace instead of a buttstock, allowing it to be fired one-handed like a handgun; AR pistols can be chambered in pistol cartridges like 9x19mm, .357 SIG, & .40 S&W, or rifle cartridges like the 5.56x45mm & .300 Blackout.

Personal defense weapons were developed to provide rear and "second-line" personnel not otherwise armed with high-caliber firearms (vehicle and weapon crews, engineers, logistical personnel, etc.) with a method of effective self-defense against skirmishers and infiltrators who cannot effectively be defeated by low-powered submachine guns and handguns, often the only firearms suitable for those personnel (while they could be issued rifles or carbines, those would become unnecessary burdens in their normal duties, during which the likelihood of hostility is fairly rare regardless, making their issuance questionable). PDWs were also designed for use by special forces teams as some use specialized ammunition designed to offer better penetration against modern body armor than traditional pistol rounds but with reduced recoil, such as the MP7, they also offer an advantage for missions when stealth and concealability are needed. PDWs are also used by law enforcement for situations when they don't want to appear conspicuously armed, such as undercover DEA and FBI agents or Secret Service agents on protection details, as a PDW can easily be concealed under a coat or jacket but still be rapidly deployed.

Examples of personal defense weapons include the FN P90, Heckler & Koch MP7, AAC Honey Badger, ST Kinetics CPW, SIG MCX, and SIG MPX.

==== Machine guns ====
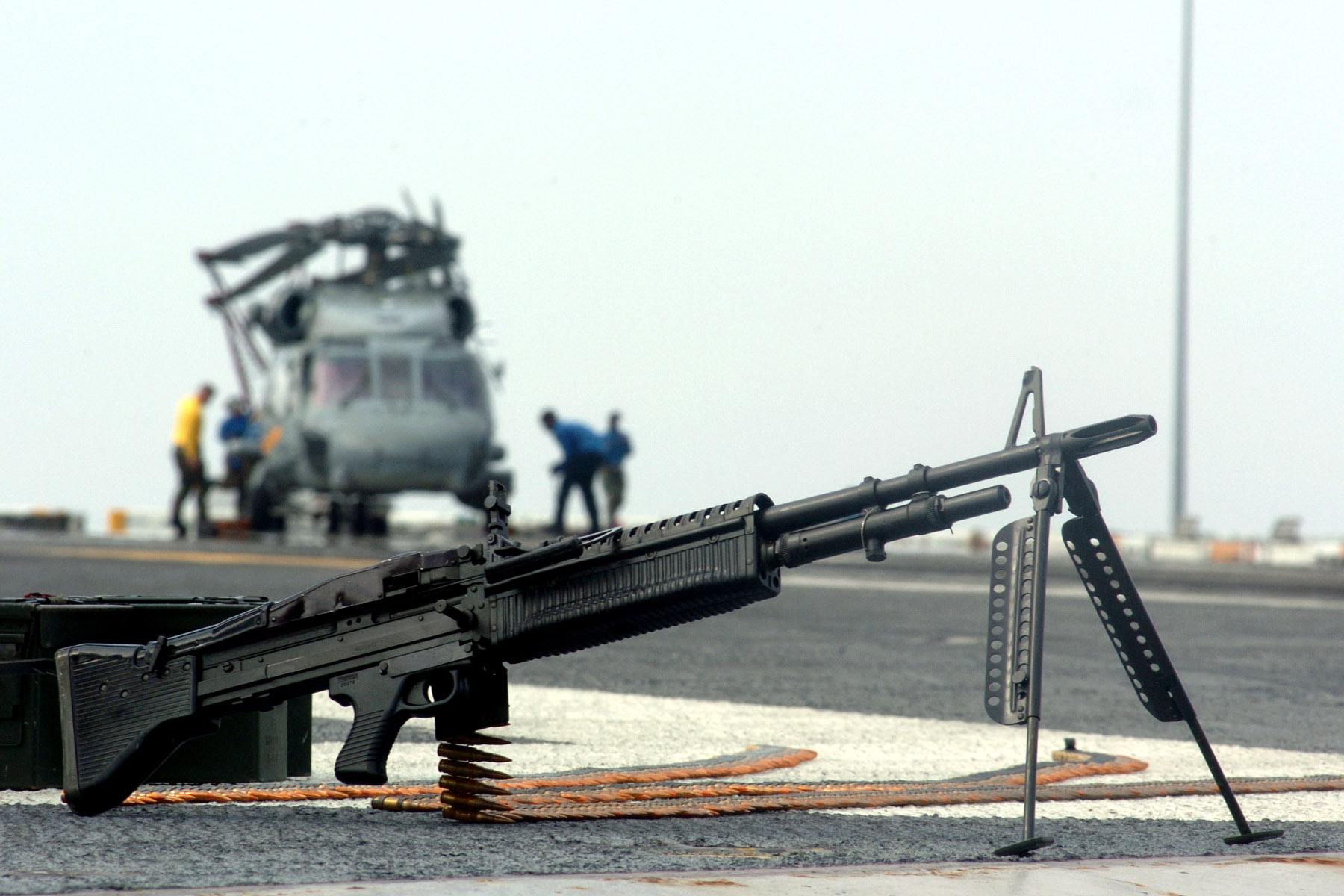
The M60, a general-purpose machine gun chambered in 7.62×51mm NATO

A machine gun is a fully-automatic firearm, chambered in intermediate or full-power rifle cartridges, designed to provide sustained automatic direct fire as opposed to the semi-automatic or burst fire of standard rifles. They are commonly associated with being belt-fed, though many machine guns are also fed by box, drum, pan, or hopper magazines. They generally have a high rate of fire and a large ammunition capacity, and are often used for suppressive fire to support infantry advances or defend positions from enemy assaults. Owing to their versatility and firepower, they are also commonly installed on military vehicles and military aircraft, either as main or ancillary weapons. Many machine guns are individual-served and can be operated by a single soldier, though some are crew-served weapons that require a dedicated crew of soldiers to operate, usually between two and six soldiers depending on the machine gun's operation and the crew members' roles (ammunition bearers, spotters, etc.).

Machine guns can be divided into three categories: light machine guns, individual-served machine guns of an intermediate cartridge that are usually magazine-fed; medium machine guns, belt-fed machine guns of a full-power caliber and a certain weight that can be operated by an individual but tend to work best with a crew; and heavy machine guns, machine guns that are too large and heavy to be carried and are thus mounted to something (like a tripod or military vehicle), and require a crew to operate. A general-purpose machine gun combines these categories under a single flexible machine gun platform, often one that is most suitable as a light or medium machine gun but fares well as a heavy machine gun. A closely related concept is the squad automatic weapon, a portable light machine gun or even a modified rifle that is designed and fielded to provide a squad with rapid direct fire.

Examples of machine guns include the Maxim gun, M2 Browning, Bren light machine gun, MG 42, PK machine gun, FN MAG, M249 light machine gun, RPK, IWI Negev, and M134 Minigun.

== Action ==
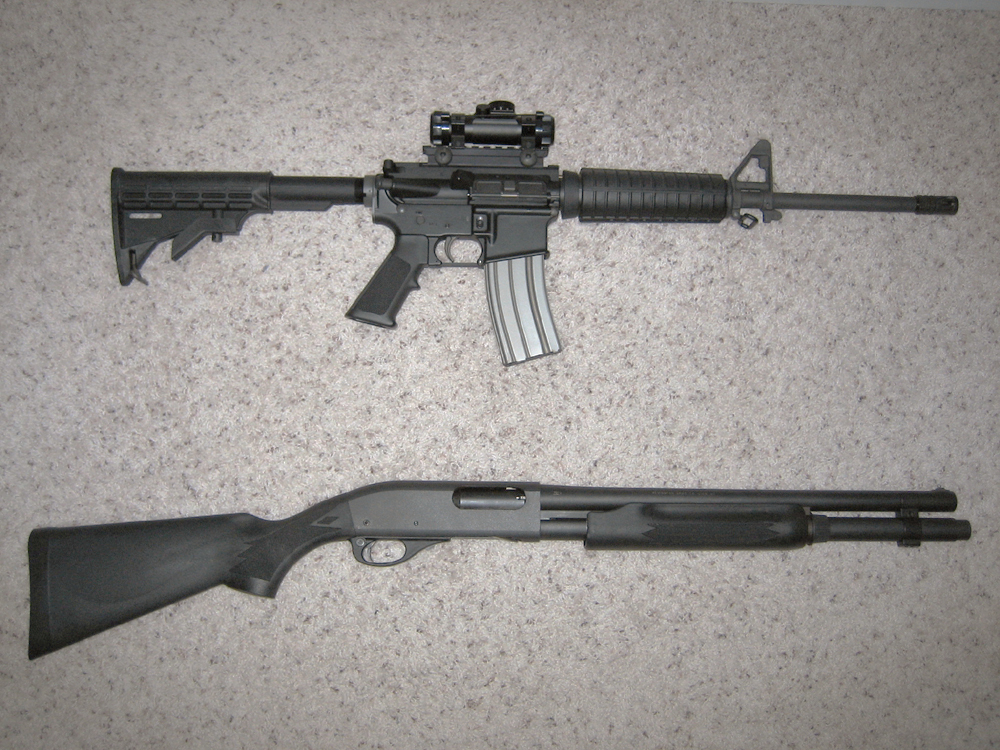
The semi-automatic Colt AR-15 (top) and the pump action Remington Model 870 (bottom); these weapons' actions are common for their respective types.

Types aside, firearms are also categorized by their "action", which describes their loading, firing, and unloading cycle.

=== Manual ===
Manual action or manual operation is essentially any type of firearm action that is loaded, and usually also fired, one cartridge at a time by the user, rather than automatically. Manual action firearms can be divided into two basic categories: single-shot firearms that can only be fired once per barrel before it must be reloaded or charged via an external mechanism or series of steps; and repeating firearms that can be fired multiple times per barrel, but can only be fired once with each subsequent pull of the trigger or ignite, and the firearm's action must be reloaded or charged via an internal mechanism between trigger pulls.

Types of manual actions include lever action, bolt action, and pump action.

==== Break action ====
Break action or hinge action firearms open like a door on a hinge, providing access to the breech to load or unload the firearm, once the gun has been fired the action can then be opened to unload the spent shell(s) and reload. This type of action is most common with shotguns, but it is also seen with certain types of rifles such as double rifles and certain types of pistols. Break-action firearms commonly use either a single barrel, meaning only one shot can be fired before reloading, or use two barrels like with double-barreled or over-under shotgun and rifles.

Examples of break-action single barrel shotguns include the Winchester Model 37, a double-barrel example is the Stoeger Coach Gun, and a break-action rifle example would be the high end Holland & Holland double rifle, such as the .500 Nitro Express.

==== Lever action ====
Lever action is a repeating action that is operated by using a cocking handle (the "lever") located around the trigger guard area (often incorporating it) that is pulled down then back up to move the bolt via internal linkages. As the bolt moves back it pushes the hammer back (most lever-action firearms use a hammer) into the cocked position, or in the case of a hammerless model it resets the firing pin mechanism. This also causes the bolt to expel the old cartridge and a fresh round to pop out of the magazine tube or box (most lever-action rifles use a tubular magazine), with the follower raising the round up into position, then as the lever is pushed back up the bolt closes and pushes the fresh round into the chamber. Most lever-action firearms are rifles, but there are a few types of lever-action shotguns.

Examples of lever-action rifles include the Henry rifle, Winchester Model 1894, & Marlin Model 1895.

==== Revolving action ====
Revolving action is a type of firearm action primarily found on handguns known as revolvers, but there are a few types of revolving rifles and shotguns. Revolvers are so named because cartridges are loaded into a cylinder, the cylinder has separate chambers for each cartridge (the most common size is six), as the revolver is fired the cylinder rotates (or "revolves") aligning each of the chambers with the barrel. There are two types of revolvers: single-action and double-action. With single-action revolvers, the hammer must be manually cocked back by the operator each time the gun is fired to rotate the cylinder. With double-action revolvers, pulling the trigger rotates the cylinder, cocks the hammer back, and releases the hammer all in one motion, allowing for a faster rate-of-fire; however the revolver can also be fired single-action style by manually cocking the hammer, this makes the trigger pull much lighter and improves accuracy. Some modern revolvers are known as double-action only, instead of having an external hammer they use an internal striker mechanism, as the trigger is pulled it rotates the cylinder and resets the striker's firing pin, as such it can only be fired double-action style.

Examples of revolvers include the Colt Single Action Army, Colt M1889 (early double-action), Colt Python (modern double-action), Ruger Single-Six (modern single-action), & Ruger LCR (double-action only).

==== Bolt action ====
Bolt action is a repeating (and rarely single-shot) action that is operated by directly manipulating the bolt via a bolt handle. The bolt is unlocked from the receiver, then pulled back to open the breech, ejecting a cartridge, and cocking the striker and engaging it against the sear; when the bolt is returned to the forward position, a new cartridge, if loaded, is pushed out of the magazine and into the barrel chamber, and the breech is re-locked. Most bolt-action firearms are rifles, but a few are shotguns. Two designs of bolt action exist: rotating bolt, where the bolt must be axially rotated to unlock and lock the receiver; and straight pull, which does not require the bolt to be rotated, simplifying the bolt action mechanism and allowing for a greater rate of fire.

Examples of bolt-action rifles include the Winchester Model 70, Remington Model 700, Ruger M77, & Savage Model 110.

==== Pump action ====
Pump action or slide action is a repeating action that is operated by moving a sliding handguard (the "pump") on the gun's forestock rearward (frontward on some models), ejecting any spent cartridges and cocking the hammer or striker, then moving the handguard forward to load a new cartridge into the chamber. It is most common on shotguns, though pump action rifles and grenade launchers also exist.

Examples of pump-action firearms include the Remington Model 870, Mossberg 500, & Winchester Model 1200 shotguns and Remington Model 7600 rifle.

=== Automatic ===
Automatic, autoloading or self-loading firearms use the energy, force, and/or gases generated by the cartridge being discharged to cycle the action. There are three primary methods of operation for automatic firearms: blowback, gas-operated, and recoil-operated. Blowback firearms use the energy from the motion of the cartridge case as it is pushed to the rear by expanding gas created by the ignition of the gunpowder in the cartridge. Gas-operated firearms use a portion of high-pressure gas from the cartridge being fired to cycle the action, there are two main types of gas-operated firearms: direct impingement in which the gas is captured by a gas block then directed back into the action forcing the bolt backwards into a spring, piston operated guns use the gas in the gas block to force a piston above the barrel backwards to cycle the bolt. Recoil-operated firearms use the force of the recoil to cycle the action, in recoil-operated firearms the barrel is free-floating and locked together with the slide, the barrel & slide are then moved backwards by the recoil, ejecting the spent case and loading a fresh one from the magazine, with a spring propelling them back into the forward position.

An example of a blowback firearm is the Walther PPK. Examples of gas-operated guns are the M16 & AR-15 (direct impingement) and AK-47 (piston operated). An example of a recoil operated firearm is a Glock pistol.

==== Semi-automatic ====
Semi-automatic is a firearm action that only requires the operator to manually load the first round, usually by either pulling a charging handle (in the case of an AR-style rifle) or pulling back (racking) the slide (in the case of a pistol), and moving the safety into the "FIRE" position (not all firearms use a safety switch). After the discharge of the first round, the firearm automatically performs the feeding and ignition procedures necessary to prepare the firearm for a subsequent discharge. Semi-automatic firearms only discharge once with each trigger actuation, and the trigger must be actuated again to fire another cartridge.

Examples of semi-automatic handguns include the Colt 1911 & Glock, semi-automatic rifles include the AR-15, Ruger 10/22, Ruger Mini-14, & Springfield Armory M1A, and semi-automatic shotguns include the Benelli Super Black Eagle, Mossberg 940 Pro & Remington Model 1100.

==== Automatic ====
Automatic is a firearm action that uses the same automated action cycling as semi-automatic, but continues to do so for as long as the trigger is actuated, until the trigger is let go of or the firearm is depleted of available ammunition. The excess energy released from a discharged cartridge is used to load a new cartridge into the chamber, then igniting the propellant and discharging said new cartridge by delivering a hammer or striker impact on the primer. Automatic firearms are further defined by the type of cycling principles used, such as recoil operation (uses energy from the recoil to cycle the action), blowback (uses energy from the cartridge case as it is pushed by expanding gas), blow forward (use propellant gas pressure to open the breech), or gas operation (uses high-pressure gas from a fired cartridge to dispose of the spent case and load a new cartridge).

Examples of automatic firearms include the Lewis gun, M2 Browning, & M60.

==== Burst ====
Burst is a fire mode of some automatic firearms that fires a predetermined amount of rounds—usually two or three—in the same manner as automatic fire. Depending on the firearm, a single trigger actuation may fire the full burst of rounds, or it must be depressed for the entire discharge, with a single pull of the trigger firing a single round or an incomplete burst. Most firearms with burst capabilities have it as a fire mode secondary to semi-automatic or full-automatic. In most countries, including the United States, burst-fire weapons are considered to be a type of machine gun and are regulated as such, in the U.S. any firearm that fires more than one round with a single trigger actuation is a machine gun as defined by the National Firearms Act of 1934 and Title II of the Gun Control Act of 1968.

Examples of burst fire weapons include the M16A4 & M4 carbine.

==== Selective fire ====
Selective fire or select fire is the capability of a firearm to have its fire mode adjusted between semi-automatic, burst, or automatic. The modes are chosen by means of a fire mode selector, which varies depending on the weapon's design. The presence of selective-fire modes on firearms allows more efficient use of ammunition for specific tactical needs, either precision-aimed or suppressive fire. Selective fire is most commonly found on assault rifles and submachine guns.

Examples of selective fire weapons include the M16A1 (SEMI/FULL), M16A2 (SEMI/BURST), M4 (SEMI/BURST), M4A1 (SEMI/FULL), & MP5A4 (SEMI/BURST/FULL).

== Use as a blunt weapon ==
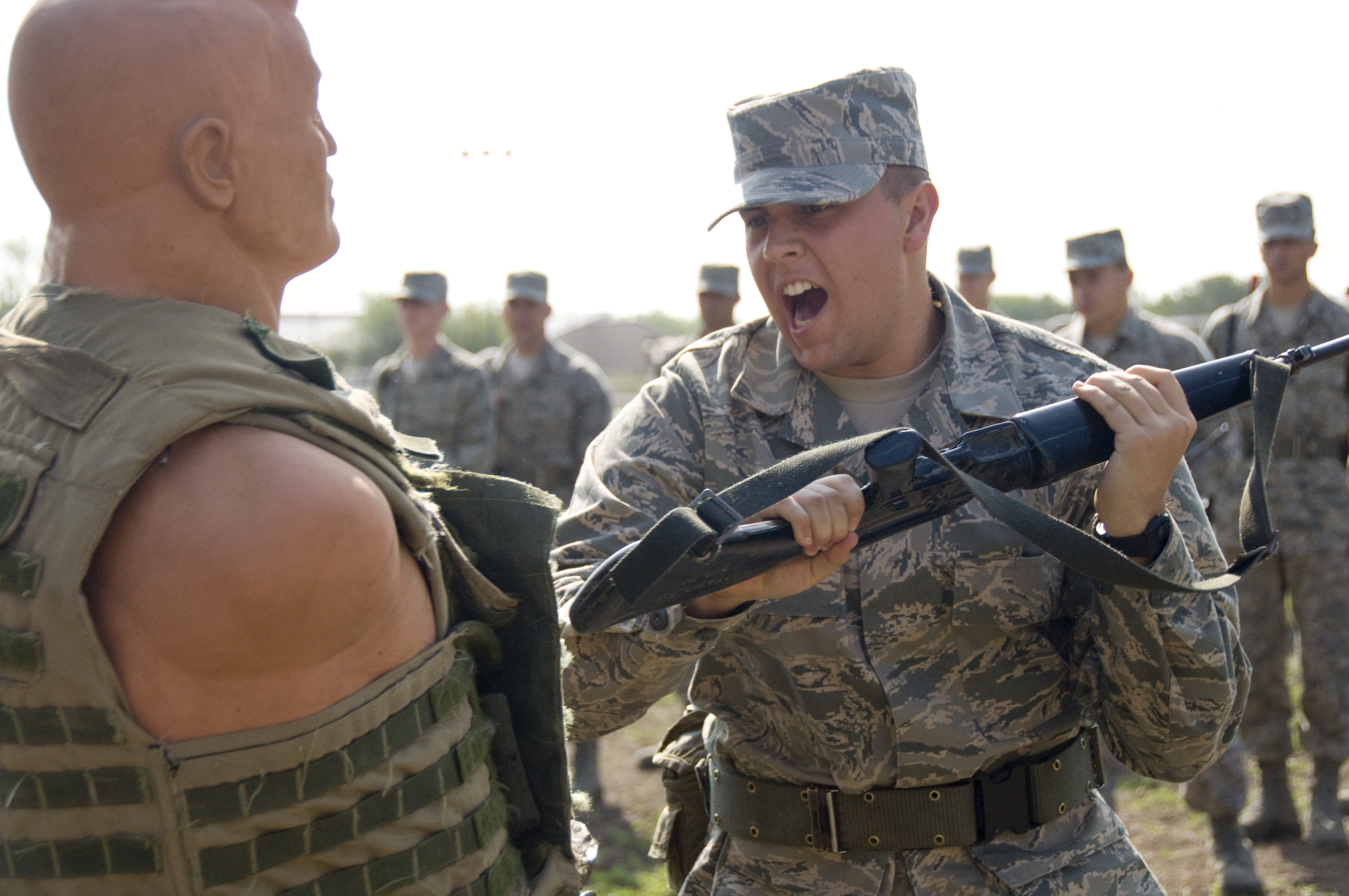
A United States Air Force trainee buttstroking a target dummy with an unloaded M16 rifle

Firearms can be used as blunt weapons, for instance to conserve limited ammunition or when ammunition has run out entirely.

New recruits of the Israel Defense Forces undergo training on the safe practice of using the M16 rifle as a blunt weapon, mainly so that in close-quarter fighting, the weapon cannot be pulled away from them. Other training includes the recruit learning how to jab parts of the body with the muzzle and using the butt stock as a weapon.

Forensic medicine recognizes evidence for various types of blunt-force injuries produced by firearms. For example, "pistol-whipping" typically leaves semicircular or triangular lacerations of skin produced by the butt of a pistol.

In armed robberies, beating the victims with firearms is a more common way to complete the robbery, rather than shooting or stabbing them.

Examples include:

- Buttstroking, striking with the butt stock of a firearm.
- Pistol-whipping, striking someone with a handgun.
- Striking with the muzzle end of a firearm without a bayonet attached.

== History ==
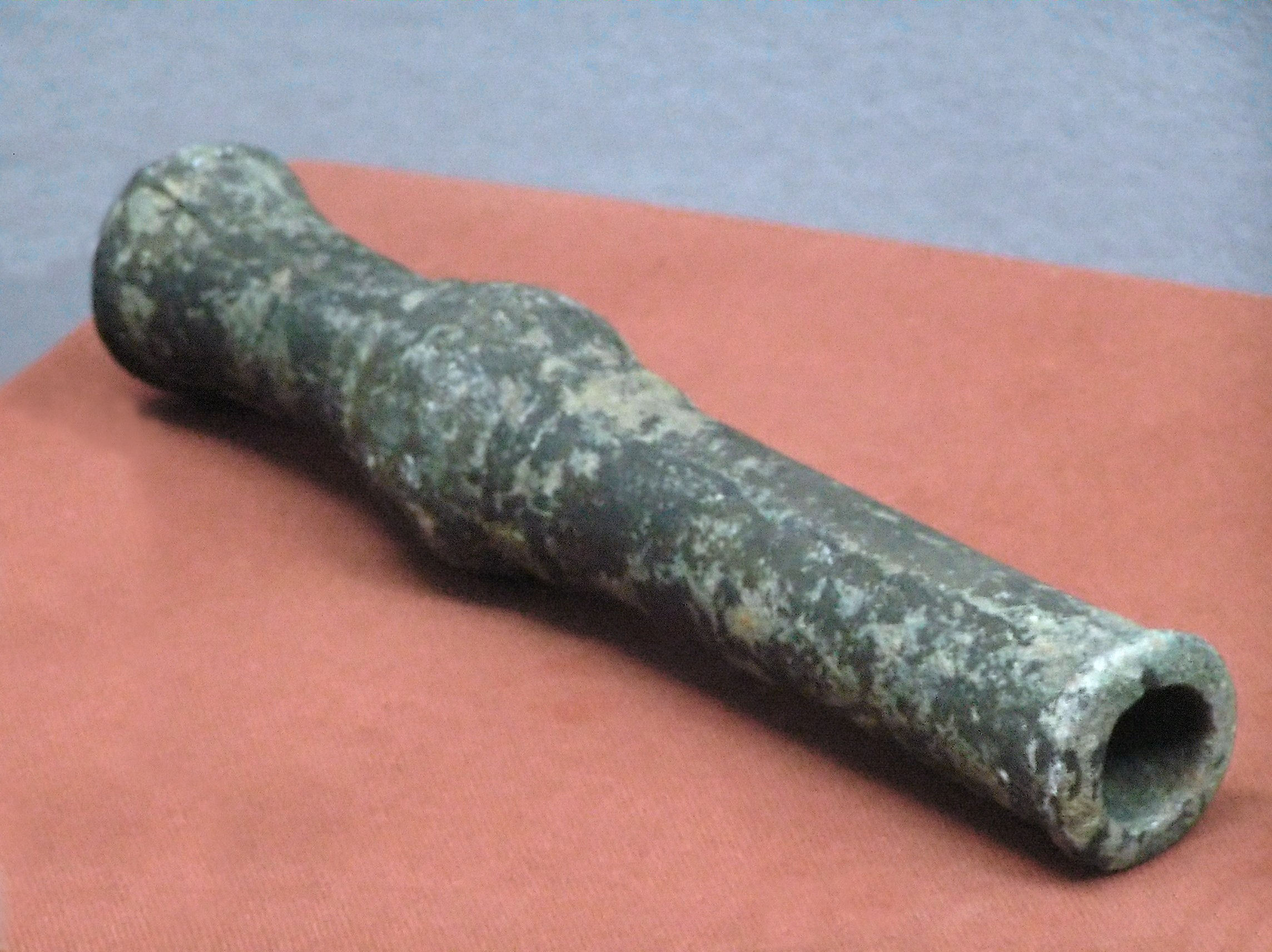
Hand cannon from the Chinese Yuan dynasty (1271–1368)

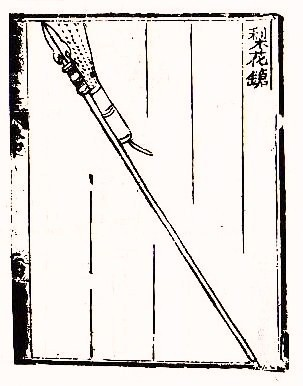
Chinese fire lance, from the Huolongjing

The first firearms were invented in 10th century China when the man-portable fire lance (a bamboo or metal tube that could shoot ignited gunpowder) was combined with projectiles such as scrap metal, broken porcelain, or darts/arrows. Over the centuries in China, several improvements were made to the fire lances and slowly transformed it into the metal-barreled hand cannon (huochong). Such improvements included increasing the proportion of saltpeter in gunpowder formulas to enhance explosive force. To withstand the greater explosive force produced, barrels were constructed from metal rather than bamboo or wood. At the same time, loose shrapnel loads were replaced with solid projectiles sized to fit the barrel more closely. Together, these improvements resulted in the hand cannon, featuring a metal barrel, high-nitrate gunpowder, and a fitted projectile.

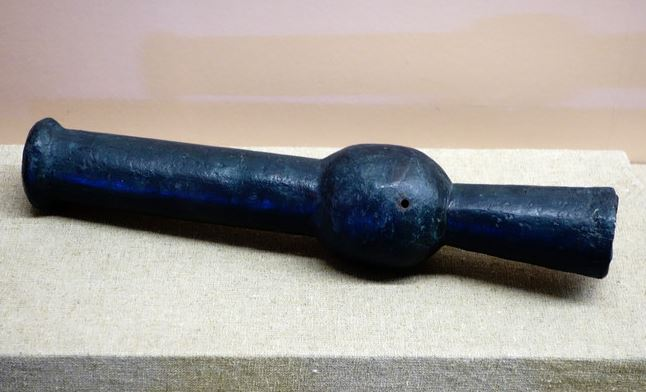
Heilongjiang Hand Cannon, dated to 1288 CE, the world's oldest surviving firearm. It includes a touch hole and a gunpowder chamber. The gunpowder would be ignited using a fuse.

An early depiction of a firearm is a sculpture from a cave in Sichuan, China. The sculpture dates to the 12th century and represents a figure carrying a vase-shaped bombard, with flames and a cannonball coming out of it. The oldest surviving gun, the Heilongjiang hand cannon, was a hand cannon made of bronze, dating to 1288 because it was discovered at a site in modern-day Acheng District, Heilongjiang, China, where the Yuan Shi (History of Yuan) records that battles were fought at that time. It describes a Jurchen commander by the name of Li Ting who led a group of soldiers equipped with hand cannons in 1288, to put down a rebellion in the region. The History of Yuan reports that the hand cannons not only "caused great damage," but also caused "such confusion that the enemy soldiers attacked and killed each other." The firearm had a 17.5 cm (6.9 in) barrel of a 2.5 cm (1 in) diameter, a 6.6 cm (2.6 in) chamber for the gunpowder and a socket for the firearm's handle. It is 34 centimetres (13 in) long and 3.54 kilograms (7.8 lb) without the handle, which would have been made of wood.

The Arabs and Mamluks had firearms in the late-13th century. Europeans obtained firearms in the 14th century. The Koreans adopted firearms from the Chinese in the 14th century. The Iranians (first Aq Qoyunlu and Safavids) and Indians (first Mughals) all got them no later than the 15th century, from the Ottoman Turks. The people of the Nusantara archipelago of Southeast Asia used the long arquebus at least by the last quarter of the 15th century.

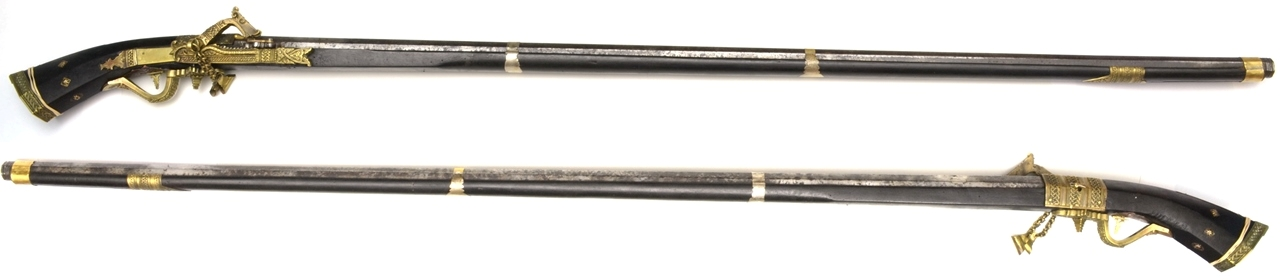
The istinggar, a result of Indo-Portuguese gun-making traditions

Even though the knowledge of making gunpowder-based weapons in the Nusantara archipelago had been known after the failed Mongol invasion of Java (1293), and the predecessor of firearms, the pole gun (bedil tombak), was recorded as being used by Java in 1413, the knowledge of making "true" firearms came much later, after the middle of 15th century. It was brought by the Islamic nations of West Asia, most probably the Arabs. The precise year of introduction is unknown, but it may be safely concluded to be no earlier than 1460. Before the arrival of the Portuguese in Southeast Asia, the natives already possessed firearms, the Java arquebus.

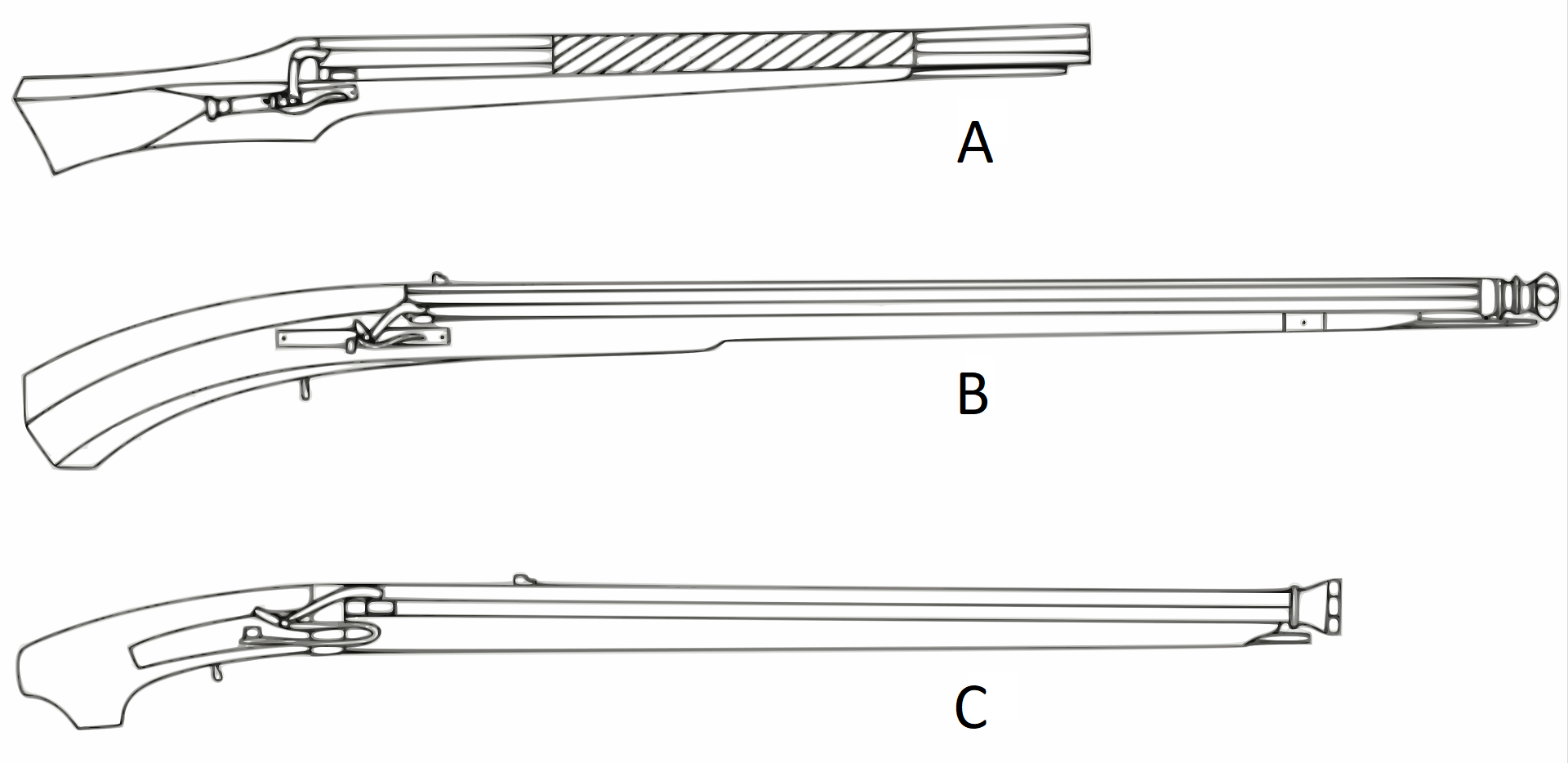
A) The matchlock gun with button for trigger, which came to Lisbon from Bohemia, used by the Portuguese until the conquest of Goa in 1510. B) The Indo-Portuguese matchlock gun resulted from the combination of Portuguese and Goan gunmaking. C) The Japanese matchlock gun appeared as a copy of the first firearm introduced in the Japanese islands.

The technology of firearms in Southeast Asia further improved after the Portuguese capture of Malacca (1511). Starting in the 1513, the traditions of German and Bohemian gun-making merged with Turkish gun-making traditions. This resulted in the Indo-Portuguese tradition of matchlocks. Indian craftsmen modified the design by introducing a very short, almost pistol-like buttstock held against the cheek, not the shoulder, when aiming. They also reduced the caliber and made the gun lighter and more balanced. This was a hit with the Portuguese who did a lot of fighting aboard ship and on river craft, and valued a more compact gun. The Malaccan gunfounders, compared as being in the same level with those of Germany, quickly adapted these new firearms, and thus a new type of arquebus, the istinggar, appeared. The Japanese did not acquire firearms until the 16th century, and then from the Portuguese rather than from the Chinese.

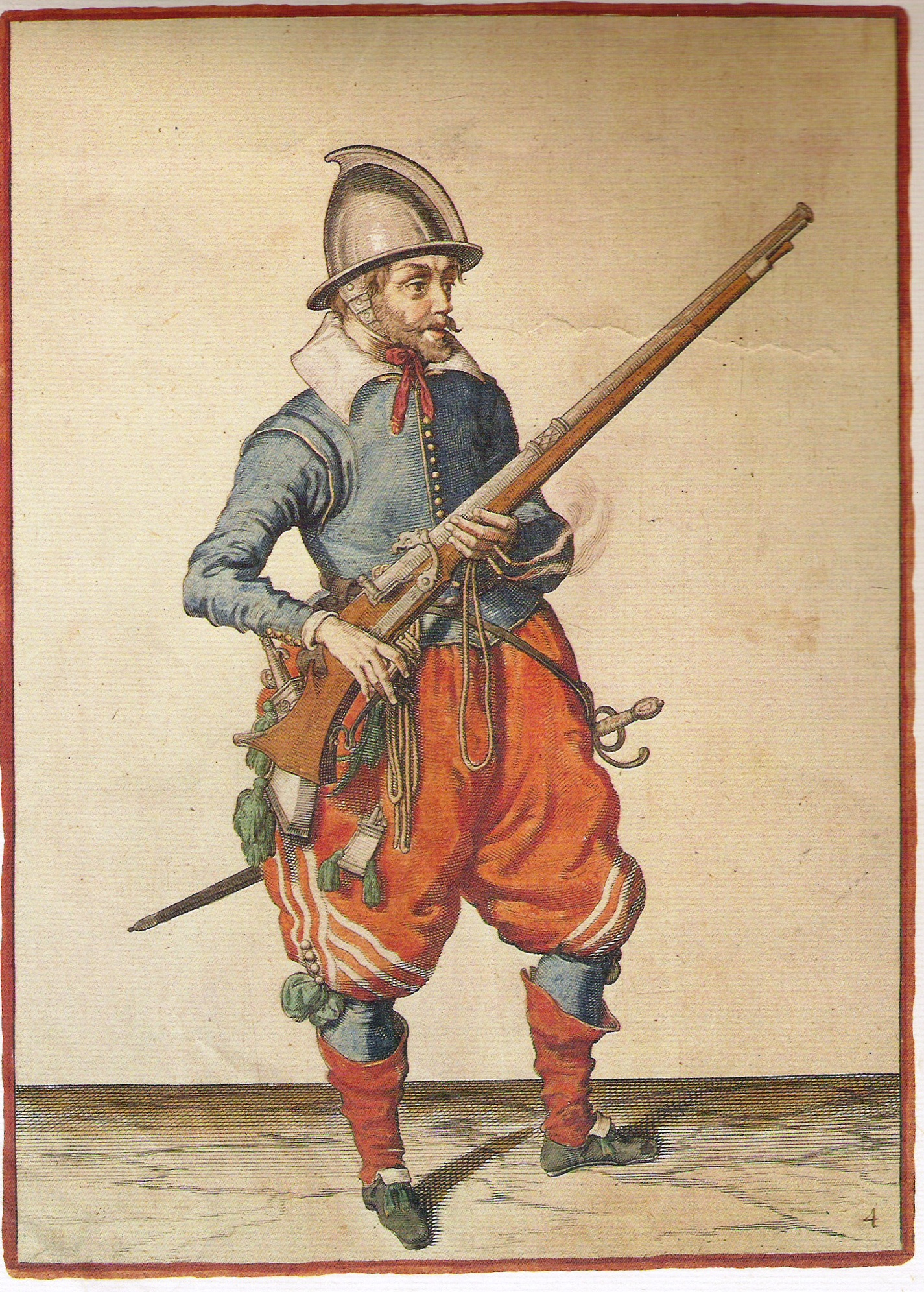
A musketeer (1608)

Developments in firearms accelerated during the 19th and 20th centuries. Breech-loading became more or less a universal standard for the reloading of most hand-held firearms and continues to be so with some notable exceptions (such as mortars). Instead of loading individual rounds into weapons, magazines holding multiple munitions were adopted—these aided rapid reloading. Automatic and semi-automatic firing mechanisms meant that a single soldier could fire many more rounds in a minute than a vintage weapon could fire over the course of a battle. Polymers and alloys in firearm construction made weaponry progressively lighter and thus easier to deploy. Ammunition changed over the centuries from simple metallic ball-shaped projectiles that rattled down the barrel to bullets and cartridges manufactured to high precision. Beginning in the 20th century particular attention has focused on accuracy and sighting to make firearms altogether far more accurate than ever before. More than any single factor though, firearms have proliferated due to the advent of mass production—enabling arms-manufacturers to produce large quantities of weaponry to a consistent standard.

Velocities of bullets increased with the use of a "jacket" of metals such as copper or copper alloys that covered a lead core and allowed the bullet to glide down the barrel more easily than exposed lead. Such bullets are known as "full metal jacket" (FMJ). Such FMJ bullets are less likely to fragment on impact and are more likely to traverse through a target while imparting less energy. Hence, FMJ bullets impart less tissue damage than non-jacketed bullets that expand. This led to their adoption for military use by countries adhering to the Hague Convention of 1899.

That said, the basic principle behind firearm operation remains unchanged to this day. A musket of several centuries ago is still similar in principle to a modern-day rifle—using the expansion of gases to propel projectiles over long distances—albeit less accurately and rapidly.

=== Early firearm models ===
==== Fire lances ====
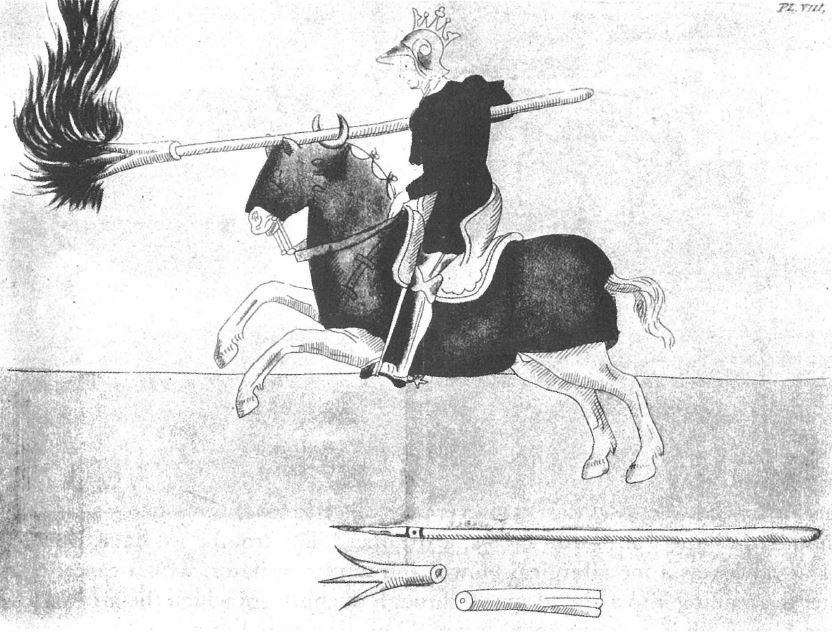
A cavalryman wielding a fire lance.

The Chinese fire lance from the 10th century was the direct predecessor to the modern concept of the firearm. It was not a gun itself, but an addition to soldiers' spears. Originally it consisted of paper or bamboo barrels that would contain incendiary gunpowder that could be lit one time and which would project flames at the enemy. Sometimes Chinese troops would place small projectiles within the barrel that would also be projected when the gunpowder was lit, but most of the explosive force would create flames. Later, the barrel was changed to be made of metal, so that more explosive gunpowder could be used and put more force into the propulsion of projectiles.

==== Hand cannons ====
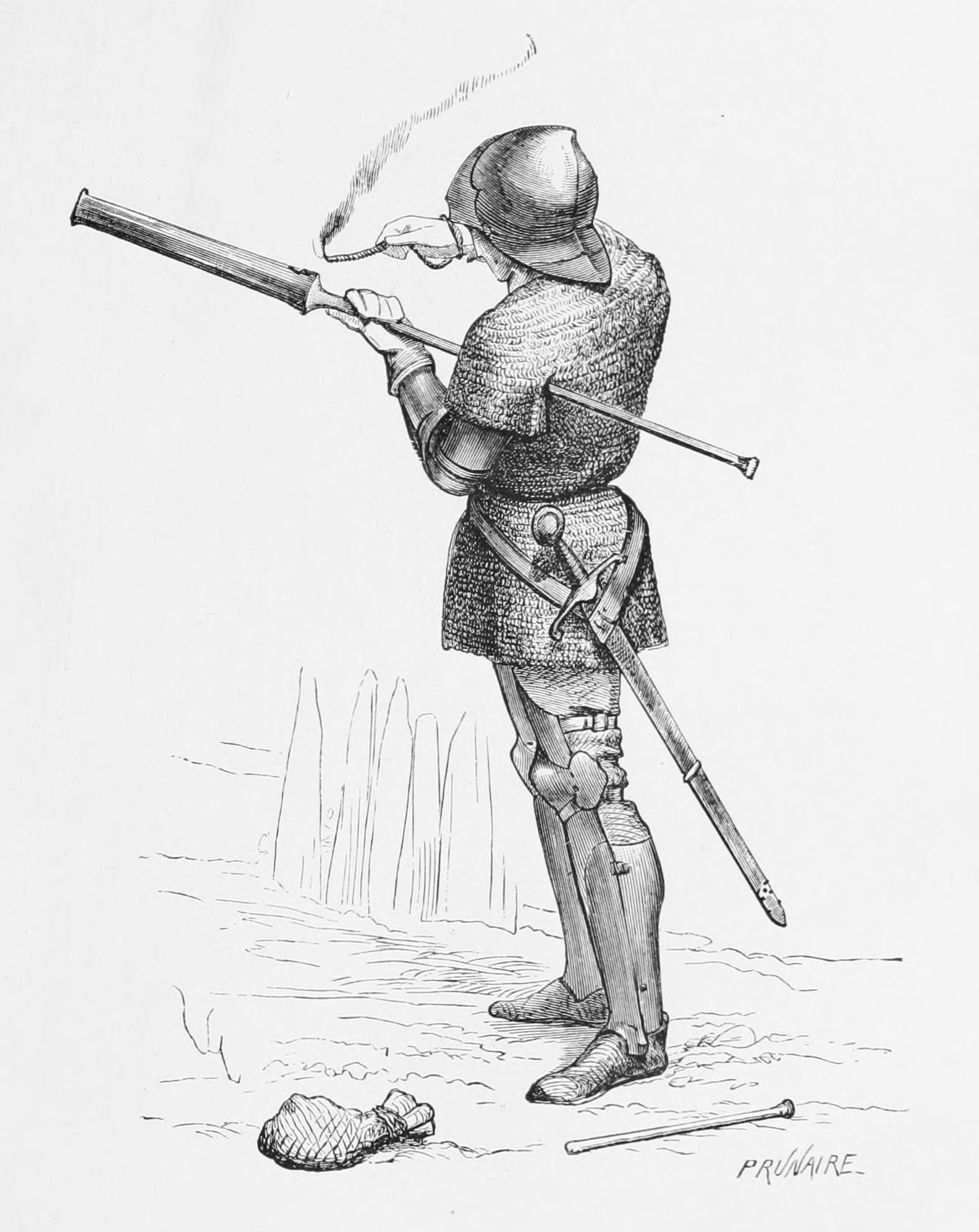
A Swiss soldier firing a hand cannon.

The original predecessor of all firearms, the Chinese hand cannon from the 13th century, was loaded with gunpowder and the projectile (initially lead shot, later replaced by cast iron) through the muzzle, while a fuse was placed at the rear. This fuse was lit, causing the gunpowder to ignite and propel the projectiles. In military use, the Chinese hand cannon was tremendously powerful, while also being somewhat erratic due to the relative inability of the gunner to aim the weapon, or to control the ballistic properties of the projectile. Recoil could be absorbed by bracing the barrel against the ground using a wooden support, the forerunner of the stock. Neither the quality nor amount of gunpowder, nor the consistency in projectile dimensions was controlled, with resulting inaccuracy in firing due to windage, variance in gunpowder composition, and the difference in diameter between the bore and the shot. Hand cannons were replaced around the 15th century by lighter carriage-mounted artillery pieces, and ultimately by the arquebus.

In the 1420s, gunpowder was used to propel missiles from hand-held tubes during the Hussite revolt in Bohemia.

==== Arquebuses ====
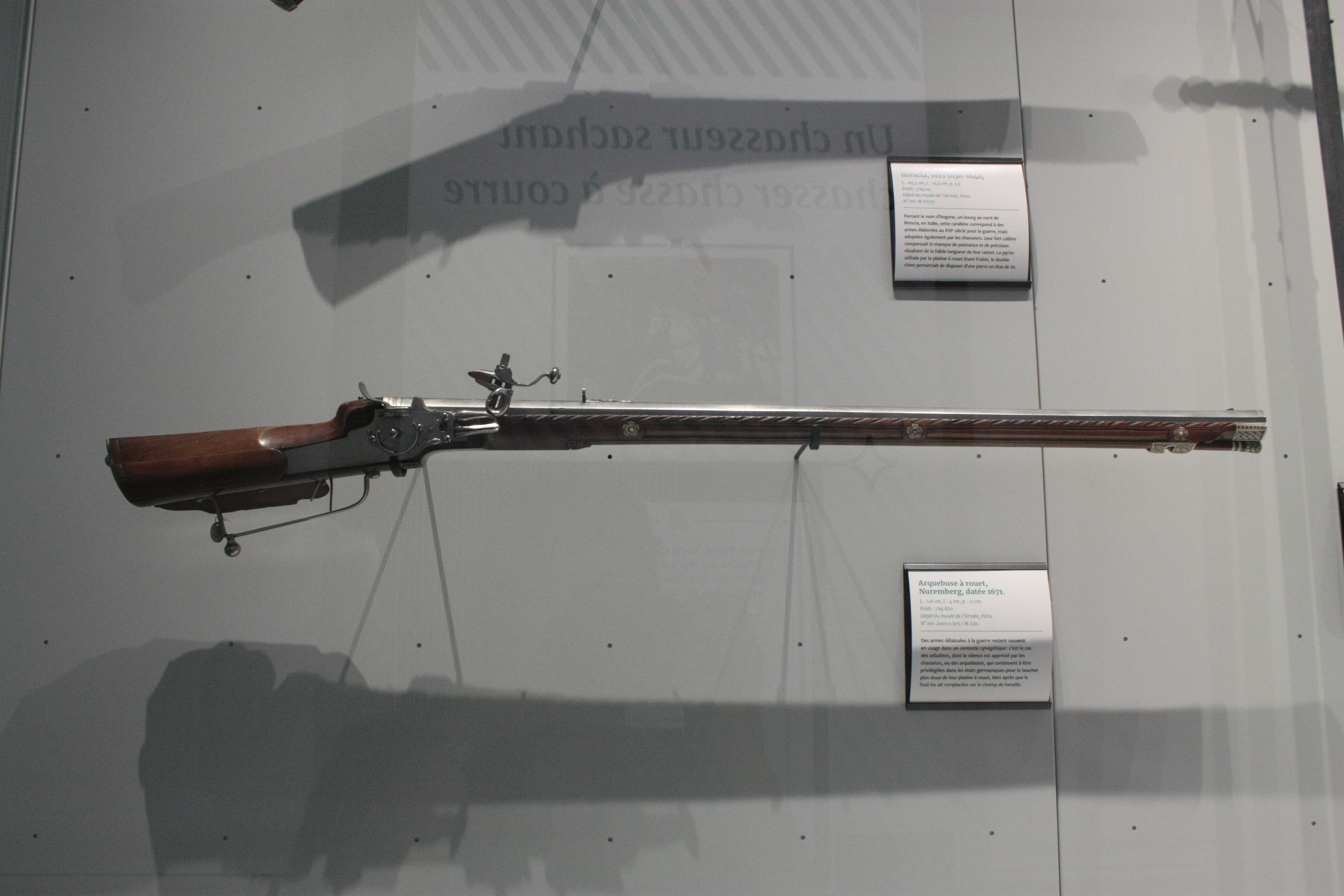
A 17th Century arquebus at the Château de Foix Museum, France.

The arquebus is a long gun that appeared in Europe and the Ottoman Empire during the 15th Century. The term arquebus is derived from the Dutch word haaqbus (literally meaning hook gun). The term arquebus was applied to many different types of guns. In their earliest form they were defensive weapon mounts on German city walls in the 15th Century. The addition of a shoulder stock, priming pan and matchlock mechanism in the late 15th century turned the arquebus into a handheld firearm, and also first firearm equipped with a trigger. Heavy arquebuses mounted on war wagons were called arquebus a croc. These heavy arquebuses fired a lead ball of about 3.5 ounces (100g).

==== Muskets ====
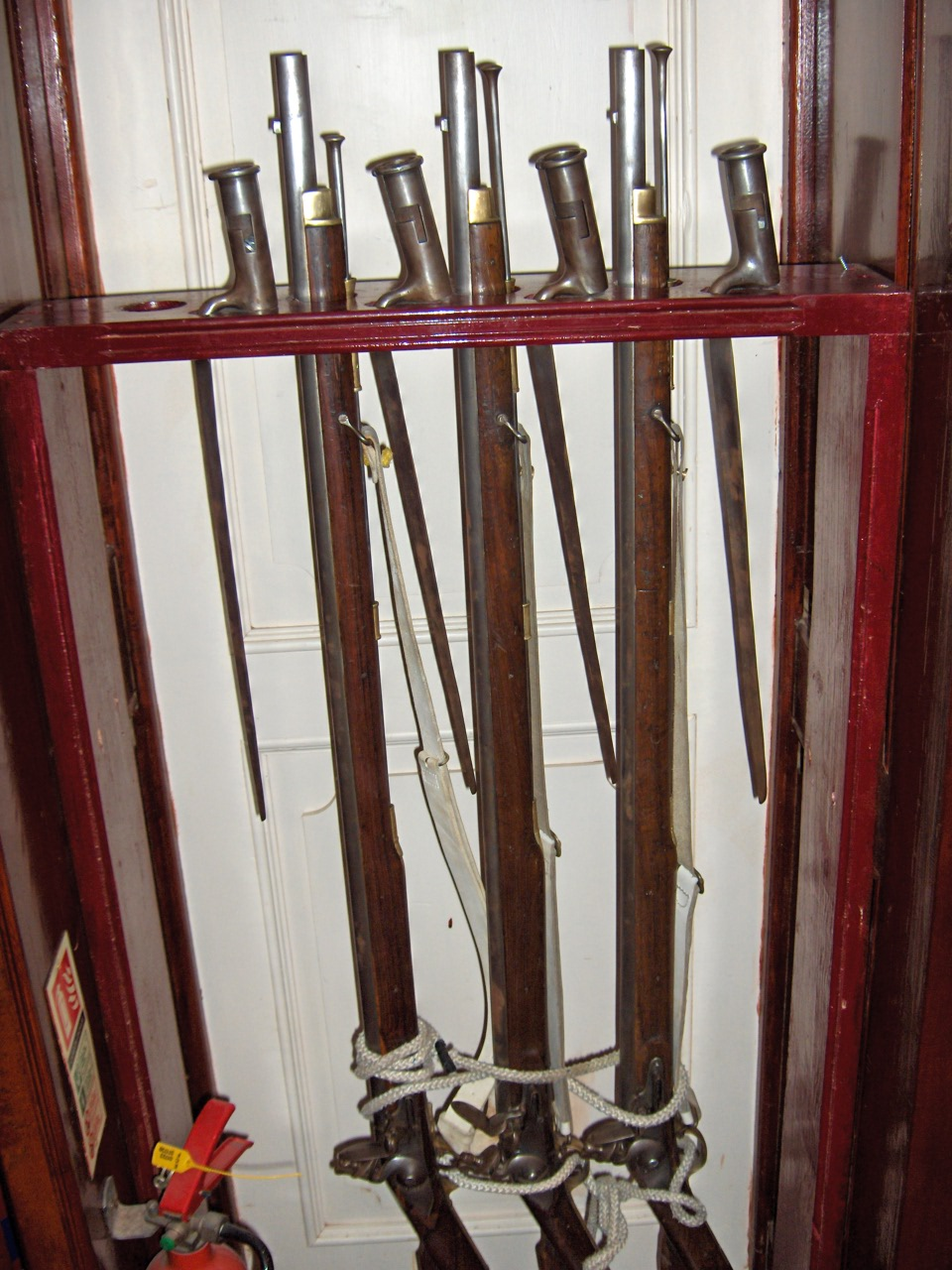
Muskets and bayonets aboard the frigate Grand Turk.

Muzzle-loading muskets (smooth-bored long guns) were among the first firearms developed in 16th century Spain. The firearm was loaded through the muzzle with gunpowder, optionally with some wadding, and then with a bullet (usually a solid lead ball, but musketeers could shoot stones when they ran out of bullets). Greatly improved muzzleloaders (usually rifled instead of smooth-bored) are manufactured today and have many enthusiasts, many of whom hunt large and small game with their guns. Muzzleloaders have to be manually reloaded after each shot; a skilled archer could fire multiple arrows faster than most early muskets could be reloaded and fired, although by the mid-18th century when muzzleloaders became the standard small-armament of the military, a well-drilled soldier could fire six rounds in a minute using prepared cartridges in his musket. Before then, the effectiveness of muzzleloaders was hindered both by the low reloading speed and a higher chance of misfiring.

One interesting solution to the reloading problem was the "Roman Candle Gun" with superposed loads. This was a muzzleloader in which multiple charges and balls were loaded one on top of the other, with a small hole in each ball to allow the subsequent charge to be ignited after the one ahead of it was ignited. It was neither a very reliable nor popular firearm, but it enabled a form of "automatic" fire long before the advent of the machine gun.

=== Firing mechanisms ===
==== Matchlock ====
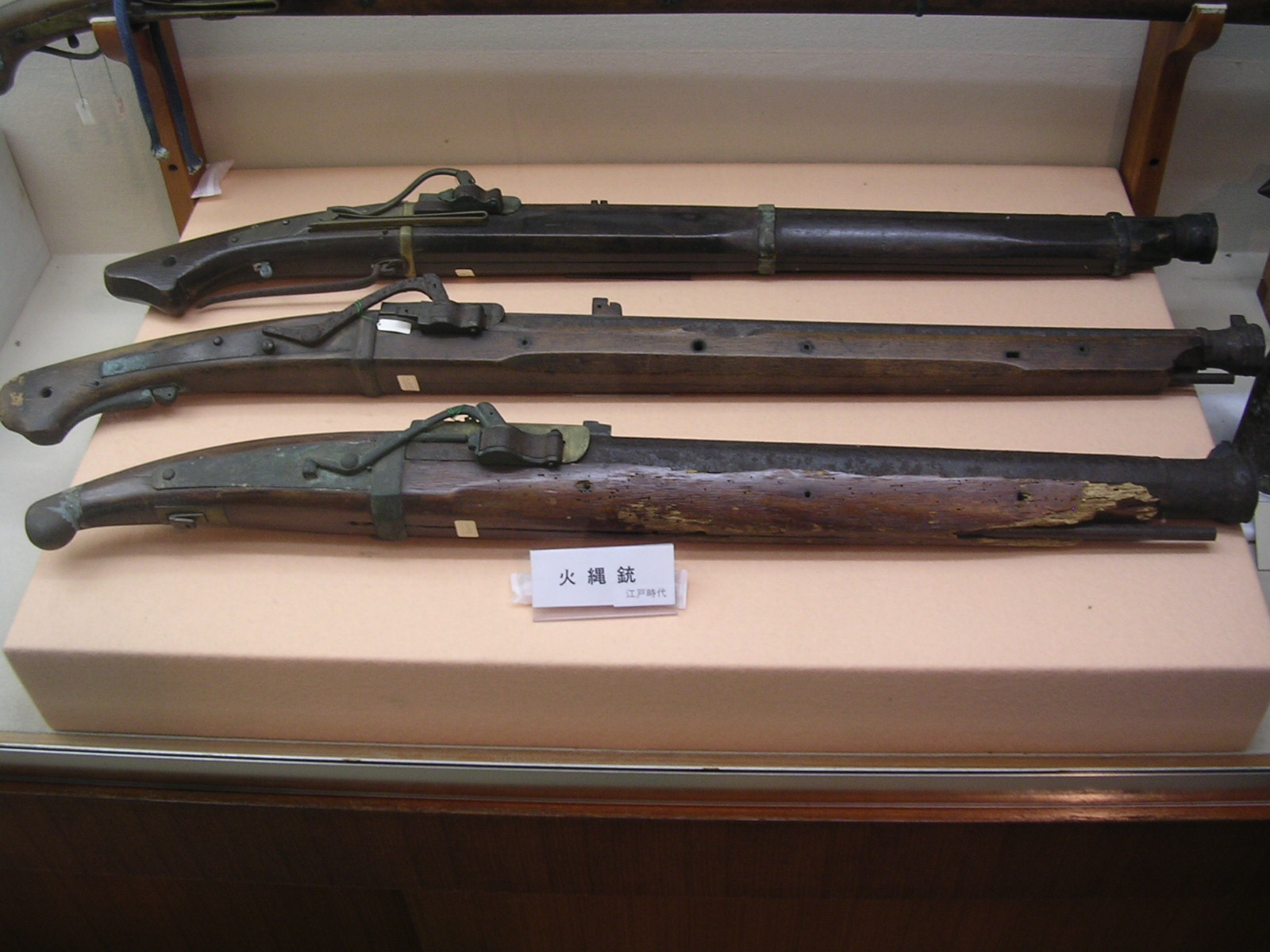
Various Japanese (samurai) Edo period matchlocks (tanegashima)

Matchlocks were the first and simplest firearms-firing mechanisms developed. In the matchlock mechanism, the powder in the gun barrel was ignited by a piece of burning cord called a "match". The match was wedged into one end of an S-shaped piece of steel. When the trigger (often actually a lever) was pulled, the match was brought into the open end of a "touch hole" at the base of the gun barrel, which contained a very small quantity of gunpowder, igniting the main charge of gunpowder in the gun barrel. The match usually had to be relit after each firing. The main parts of the matchlock firing mechanism are the pan, match, arm, and trigger. A benefit of the pan and arm swivel being moved to the side of the gun was it gave a clear line of fire. An advantage to the matchlock firing mechanism is that it did not misfire. However, it also came with some disadvantages. One disadvantage involved weather: in rain, the match could not be kept lit to fire the weapon. Another issue with the match was it could give away the position of soldiers because of the glow, sound, and smell. While European pistols were equipped with wheellock and flintlock mechanisms, Asian pistols used matchlock mechanisms up through the 17th century.

==== Wheellock ====
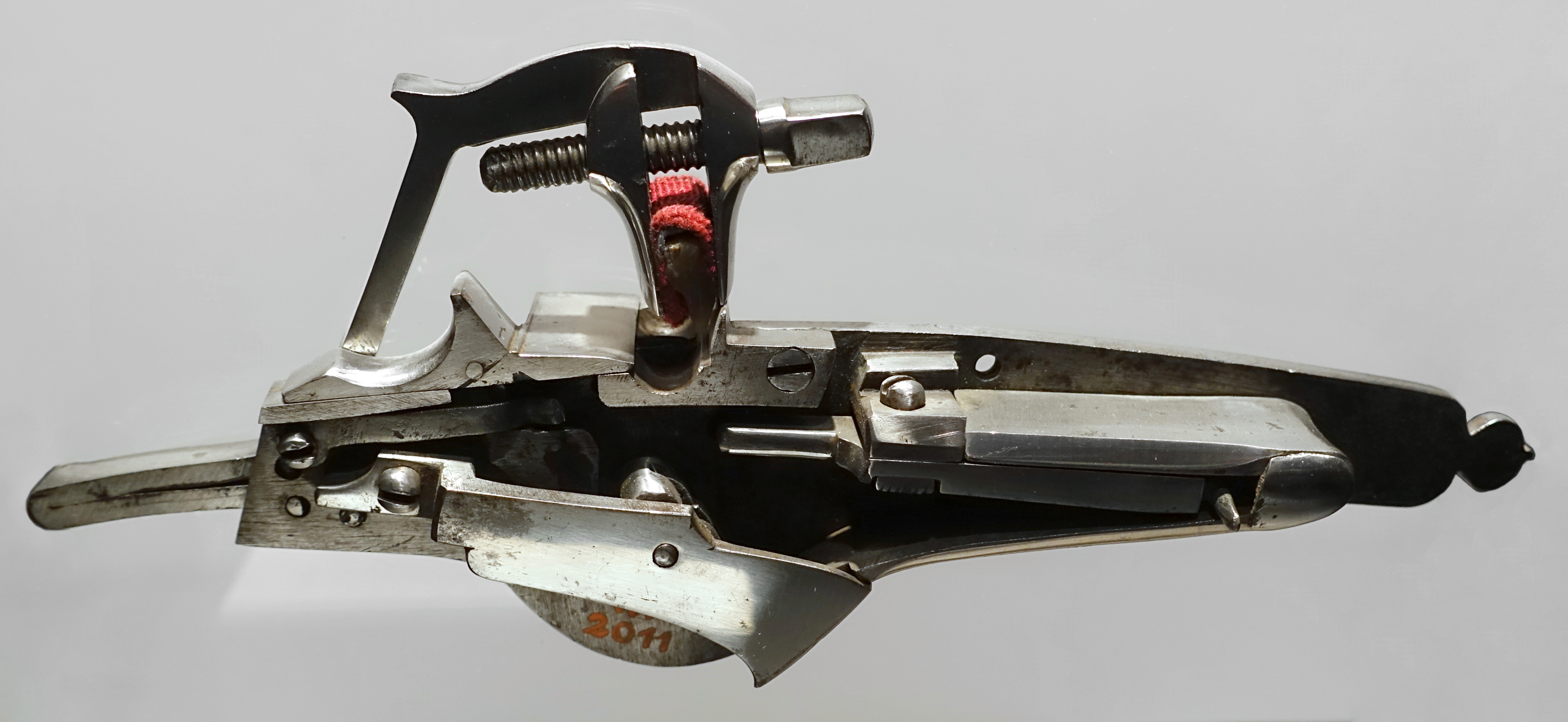
A wheellock pistol mechanism from the 17th century

The wheellock action, a successor to the matchlock, predated the flintlock. Despite its many faults, the wheellock was a significant improvement over the matchlock in terms of both convenience and safety, since it eliminated the need to keep a smoldering match in proximity to loose gunpowder. It operated using a small wheel (much like that on a cigarette lighter) which was wound up with a key before use and which, when the trigger was pulled, spun against a flint, creating the shower of sparks that ignited the powder in the touch hole. Supposedly invented by Leonardo da Vinci (1452–1519), the Italian Renaissance man, the wheellock action was an innovation that was not widely adopted due to the high cost of the clockwork mechanism.

==== Flintlock ====
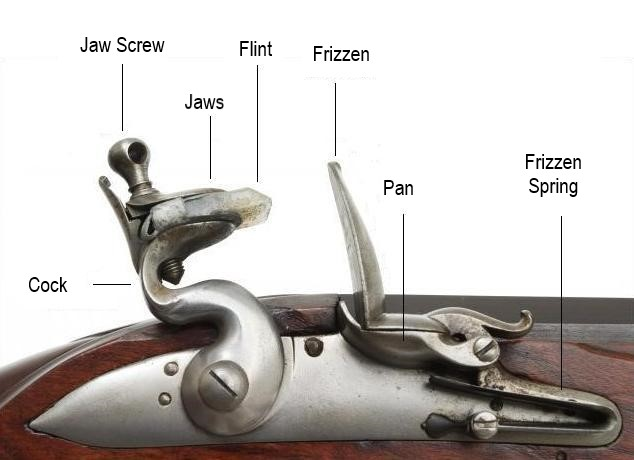
Flintlock mechanism

The flintlock action represented a major innovation in firearm design. The spark used to ignite the gunpowder in the touch hole came from a sharpened piece of flint clamped in the jaws of a "cock" which, when released by the trigger, struck a piece of steel called the "frizzen" to generate the necessary sparks. (The spring-loaded arm that holds a piece of flint or pyrite is referred to as a cock because of its resemblance to a rooster.) The cock had to be manually reset after each firing, and the flint had to be replaced periodically due to wear from striking the frizzen. (See also flintlock mechanism, snaphance, Miquelet lock.) The flintlock was widely used during the 17th, 18th, and 19th centuries in both muskets and rifles.

==== Percussion cap ====
Percussion caps (caplock mechanisms), coming into wide service in the early 19th century, offered a dramatic improvement over flintlocks. With the percussion-cap mechanism, the small primer charge of gunpowder used in all preceding firearms was replaced by a completely self-contained explosive charge contained in a small brass "cap". The cap was fastened to the touch hole of the gun (extended to form a "nipple") and ignited by the impact of the gun's "hammer". (The hammer is roughly the same as the cock found on flintlocks except that it does not clamp onto anything.) In the case of percussion caps the hammer was hollow on the end to fit around the cap in order to keep the cap from fragmenting and injuring the shooter.

Once struck, the flame from the cap, in turn, ignited the main charge of gunpowder, as with the flintlock, but there was no longer any need to charge the touch hole with gunpowder, and even better, the touch hole was no longer exposed to the elements. As a result, the percussion-cap mechanism was considerably safer, far more weatherproof, and vastly more reliable (cloth-bound cartridges containing a pre-measured charge of gunpowder and a ball had been in regular military service for many years, but the exposed gunpowder in the entry to the touch hole had long been a source of misfires). All muzzleloaders manufactured since the second half of the 19th-century use percussion caps except those built as replicas of the flintlock or earlier firearms.

=== Loading techniques ===
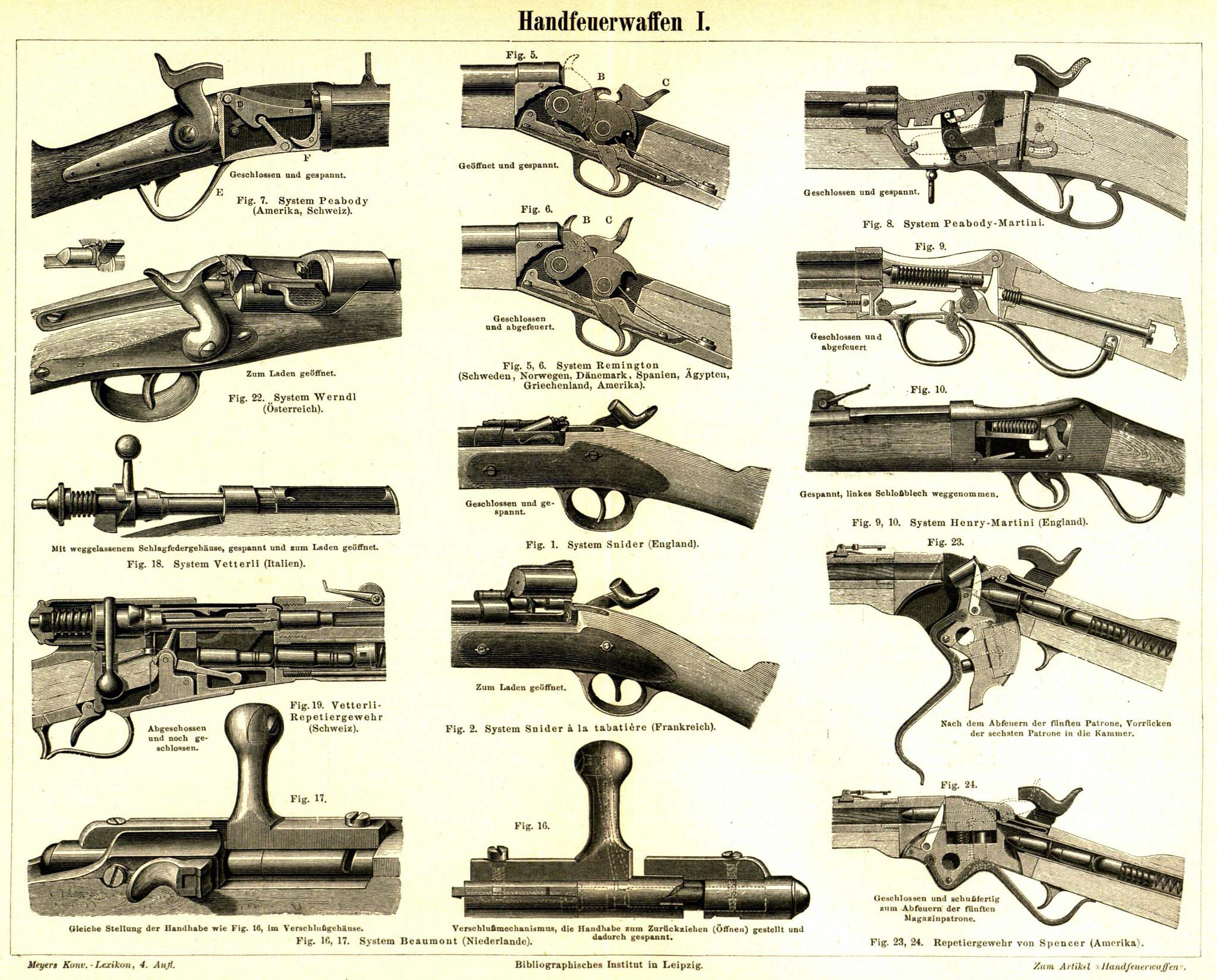
Percussion cap and early bolt action form

Most early firearms were muzzle-loading. This form of loading has several disadvantages, such as a slow rate of fire and having to expose oneself to enemy fire to reload—as the weapon had to be pointed upright so the powder could be poured through the muzzle into the breech, followed by the ramming the projectile into the breech. As effective methods of sealing the breech developed along with sturdy, weatherproof, self-contained metallic cartridges, muzzle-loaders were replaced by single-shot breech loaders. Eventually, single-shot weapons were replaced by the following repeater-type weapons.

==== Internal magazines ====
Many firearms made from the late-19th century through the 1950s used internal magazines to load the cartridge into the chamber of the weapon. The most notable and revolutionary weapons of this period appeared during the U.S. Civil War of 1861–1865: the Spencer and Henry repeating rifles. Both used fixed tubular magazines, the former having the magazine in the buttstock and the latter under the barrel, which allowed a larger capacity. Later weapons used fixed box magazines that could not be removed from the weapon without disassembling the weapon itself. Fixed magazines permitted the use of larger cartridges and eliminated the hazard of having the bullet of one cartridge butting next to the primer or rim of another cartridge. These magazines are loaded while they are in the weapon, often using a stripper clip. A clip is used to transfer cartridges into the magazine. Some notable weapons that use internal magazines include the Mosin–Nagant, the Mauser Kar 98k, the Springfield M1903, the M1 Garand, and the SKS. Firearms that have internal magazines are usually, but not always, rifles. Some exceptions to this include the Mauser C96 pistol, which uses an internal magazine, and the Breda 30, an Italian light machine gun.

==== Detachable magazines ====
Many modern firearms use what are called detachable or box magazines as their method of chambering a cartridge. Detachable magazines can be removed from the weapon without disassembling the firearms, usually by pushing a magazine release.

==== Belt-fed weapons ====
A belt or ammunition belt, a device used to retain and feed cartridges into a firearm, is commonly used with machine guns. Belts were originally composed of canvas or cloth with pockets spaced evenly to allow the belt to be mechanically fed into the gun. These designs were prone to malfunctions due to the effects of oil and other contaminants altering the belt. Later belt-designs used permanently-connected metal links to retain the cartridges during feeding. These belts were more tolerant to exposure to solvents and oil. Notable weapons that use belts include the M240, the M249, the M134 Minigun, and the PK Machine Gun.

=== Cartridges ===
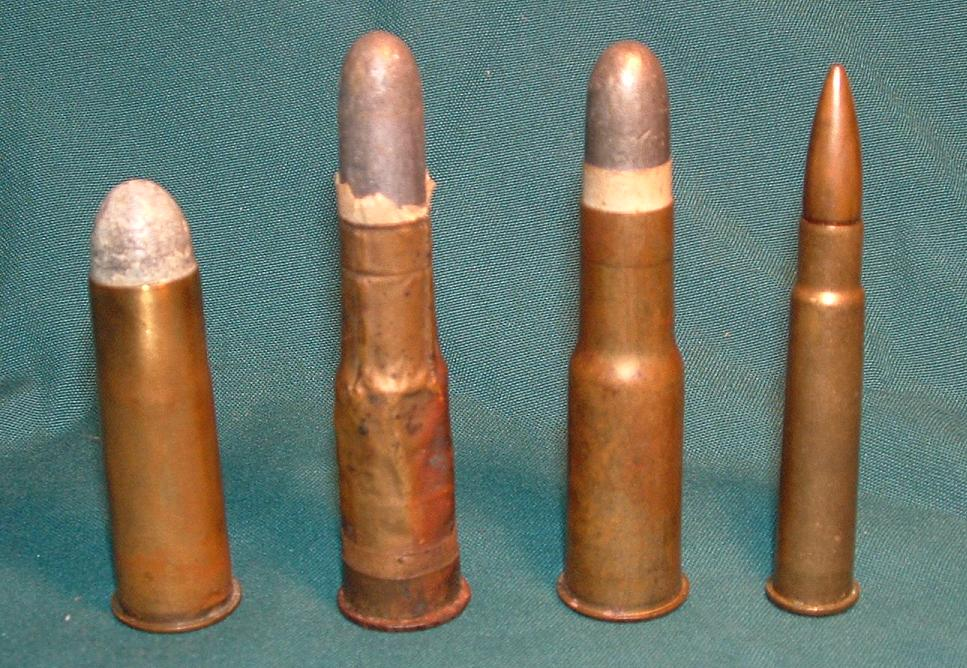
(From left to right): A .577 Snider cartridge (1867), a .577/450 Martini-Henry cartridge (1871), a later drawn brass .577/450 Martini-Henry cartridge, and a .303 British Mk VII SAA Ball cartridge.

Frenchman Louis-Nicolas Flobert invented the first rimfire metallic cartridge in 1845. His cartridge consisted of a percussion cap with a bullet attached to the top. Flobert then made what he called "parlor guns" for this cartridge, as these rifles and pistols were designed to be shot in indoor shooting-parlors in large homes. These 6mm Flobert cartridges do not contain any powder, the only propellant substance contained in the cartridge is the percussion cap. In English-speaking countries, the 6mm Flobert cartridge corresponds to .22 BB Cap and .22 CB Cap ammunition. These cartridges have a relatively low muzzle-velocity of around 700 ft/s (210 m/s).

Cartridges represented a major innovation: firearms ammunition, previously delivered as separate bullets and powder, was combined in a single metallic (usually brass) cartridge containing a percussion cap, powder, and a bullet in one weatherproof package. The main technical advantage of the brass cartridge case was the effective and reliable sealing of high-pressure gasses at the breech, as the gas pressure forces the cartridge case to expand outward, pressing it firmly against the inside of the gun-barrel chamber. This prevents the leakage of hot gas which could injure the shooter. The brass cartridge also opened the way for modern repeating arms, by uniting the bullet, gunpowder, and primer into one assembly that could be fed reliably into the breech by mechanical action in the firearm.

Before this, a "cartridge" was simply a pre-measured quantity of gunpowder together with a ball in a small cloth bag (or rolled paper cylinder), which also acted as wadding for the charge and ball. This early form of cartridge had to be rammed into the muzzleloader's barrel, and either a small charge of gunpowder in the touch hole or an external percussion cap mounted on the touch hole ignited the gunpowder in the cartridge. Cartridges with built-in percussion caps (called "primers") continue to this day to be the standard in firearms. In cartridge-firing firearms, a hammer (or a firing pin struck by the hammer) strikes the cartridge primer, which then ignites the gunpowder within. The primer charge is at the base of the cartridge, either within the rim (a "rimfire" cartridge) or in a small percussion cap embedded in the center of the base (a "centerfire" cartridge). As a rule, centerfire cartridges are more powerful than rimfire cartridges, operating at considerably higher pressures than rimfire cartridges. Centerfire cartridges are also safer, as a dropped rimfire cartridge has the potential to discharge if its rim strikes the ground with sufficient force to ignite the primer. This is practically impossible with most centerfire cartridges.

Nearly all contemporary firearms load cartridges directly into their breech. Some additionally or exclusively load from a magazine that holds multiple cartridges. A magazine is a part of the firearm which exists to store ammunition and to assist in its feeding by the action into the breech (such as through the rotation of a revolver's cylinder or by spring-loaded platforms in most pistol and rifle designs). Some magazines, such as that of most centerfire hunting rifles and all revolvers, are internal to and inseparable from the firearm, and are loaded by using a "clip". A clip (the term often mistakenly refers to a detachable "magazine") is a device that holds the ammunition by the rim of the case and is designed to assist the shooter in reloading the firearm's magazine. Examples include revolver speedloaders, the stripper clip used to aid loading rifles such as the Lee–Enfield or Mauser 98, and the en-bloc clip used in loading the M1 Garand. In this sense, "magazines" and "clips", though often used synonymously, refer to different types of devices.

=== Repeating firearms ===
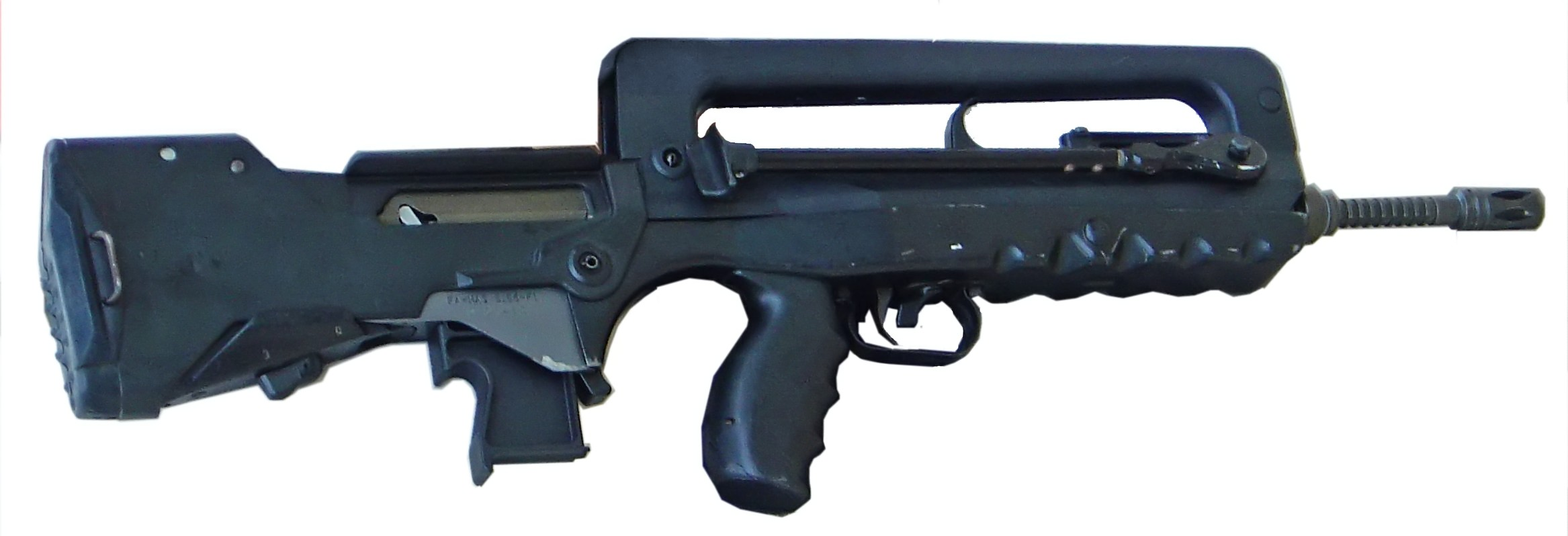
The French FAMAS, example of a bullpup rifle

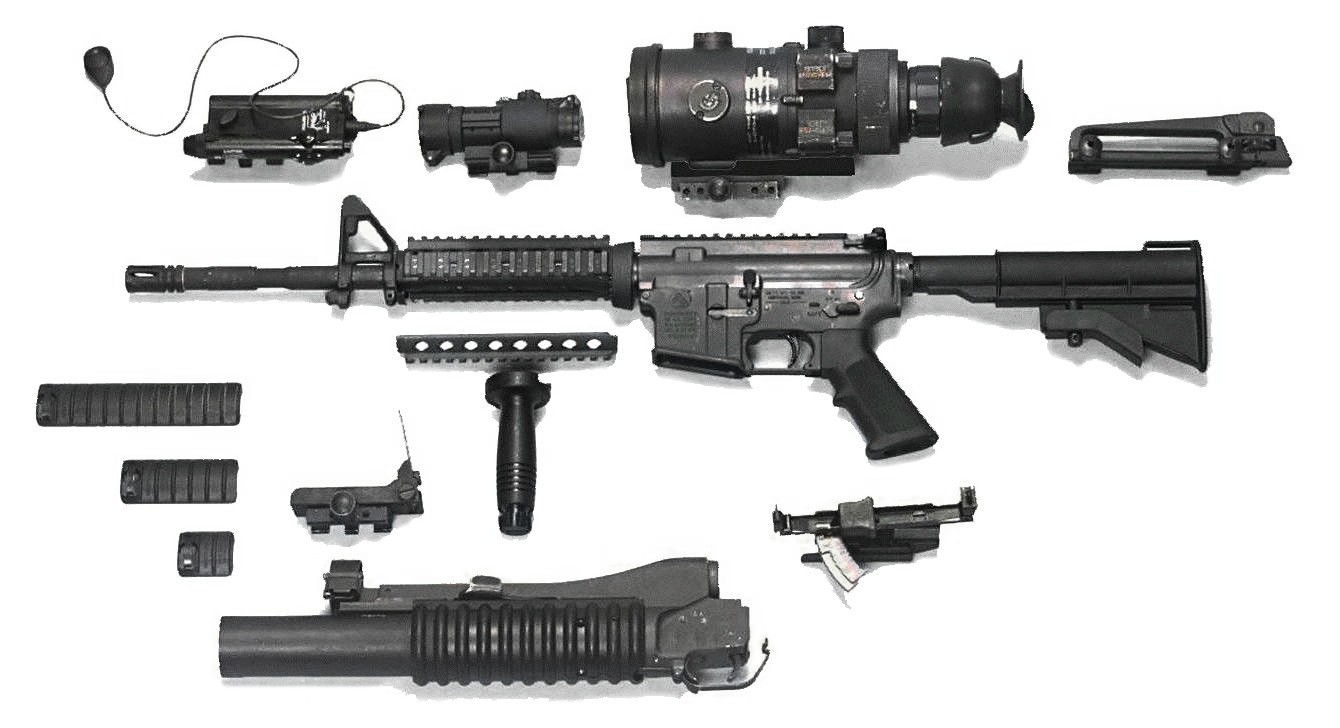
The M4 carbine, a modern service rifle capable of being fired automatically. It is in service by the U.S. military and has a wide ability for customization.

Many firearms are "single shot": i.e., each time a cartridge is fired, the operator must manually re-cock the firearm and load another cartridge. The classic single-barreled shotgun offers a good example. A firearm that can load multiple cartridges as the firearm is re-cocked is considered a "repeating firearm" or simply a "repeater". A lever-action rifle, a pump-action shotgun, and most bolt-action rifles are good examples of repeating firearms. A firearm that automatically re-cocks and reloads the next round with each trigger-pull is considered a semi-automatic or autoloading firearm.

The first "rapid firing" firearms were usually similar to the 19th-century Gatling gun, which would fire cartridges from a magazine as fast as and as long as the operator turned a crank. Eventually, the "rapid" firing mechanism was perfected and miniaturized to the extent that either the recoil of the firearm or the gas pressure from firing could be used to operate it, thus the operator needed only to pull a trigger—this made the firing mechanisms truly "automatic". An automatic (or "fully automatic") firearm automatically re-cocks, reloads, and fires as long as the trigger is depressed. An automatic firearm is capable of firing multiple rounds with one pull of the trigger. The Gatling gun may have been the first automatic weapon, though the modern trigger-actuated machine gun was not widely introduced until the First World War (1914–1918) with the German "Spandau" (adopted in 1908) and the British Lewis gun (in service from 1914). Automatic rifles such as the Browning automatic rifle were in common use by the military during the early part of the 20th century, and automatic rifles that fired handgun rounds, known as submachine guns, also appeared at this time. Many modern military firearms have a selective fire option, which is a mechanical switch that allows the firearm to be fired either in the semi-automatic or fully automatic mode. In the current M16A2 and M16A4 variants of the U.S.-made M16, continuous fully-automatic fire is not possible, having been replaced by an automatic burst of three cartridges (this conserves ammunition and increases controllability).

== Health hazards ==
Firearm hazard is quite notable, with a significant impact on the health system. In 2001, for quantification purposes, it was estimated that the cost of fatalities and injuries was US$4700 million per year in Canada (US$170 per Canadian) and US$100,000 million per year in the U.S. (US$300 per American).

=== Death ===
Gun-related homicide and suicide rates in high-income OECD countries, 2010, ordered by total death rates (homicide plus suicide plus other gun-related deaths)

From 1990 to 2015, global deaths from assault by firearm rose from 128,000 to 173,000, however this represents a drop in rate from 2.41/100,000 to 2.35/100,000, as world population has increased by more than two billion.

In 2017, there were 39,773 gun-related deaths in the United States; over 60% were suicides from firearms. In 2001, firearms were involved in cases constituting the second leading cause of "mechanism of injury deaths" (which are deaths which occur as a direct, identifiable, and immediate consequence of an event, such as a shooting or poisoning, and do not include deaths due to "natural causes" or "indirect causes" such as chronic alcohol abuse or tobacco use) after motor vehicle accidents, which comprised the majority of deaths in this category. The most recent, complete data, from 2017, shows gunshot related homicides as having been the 31st most common cause of death in the US, while gunshot related suicides was the 21st most common cause of death. Accidental discharge of a firearm accounted for the 59th most common cause of death, with 486 deaths in 2017, while 616 individuals were killed by law enforcement, comprising the 58th most common cause of death. The total number of deaths related to firearms in 2017 was 38,882 (not including incidents of deaths resulting from lethal force when used by law enforcement), while the most common cause of death, heart disease, claimed 647,457 lives, over sixteen times that of firearms, including suicides. The most recent data from the CDC, from 2020, shows that deaths involving firearms accounted for about 0.2% of all deaths nationwide in 2020, of which about two-thirds were suicides.

In the 52 high- and middle-income countries, with a combined population of 1,400 million and not engaged in civil conflict, fatalities due to firearm injuries were estimated at 115,000 people per annum, in the 1990s.

Fatalities in 52 countries, mid-1990s View source data.

In those 52 countries, a firearm is the first method used for homicide (two-thirds) but only the second method for suicide (20%.

To prevent unintentional injury, gun safety training includes education on proper firearm storage and firearm-handling etiquette.

=== Injury ===
Based on US data, it is estimated that three people are injured for one killed.

A 2017 study found that attacks account for more than half (50.2%) of all nonfatal gun injuries, while unintentional injuries make up more than one-third (36.7%).

=== Noise ===
A common hazard of repeated firearm use is noise-induced hearing loss (NIHL). NIHL can result from long-term exposure to noise or from high intensity impact noises such as gunshots. Individuals who shoot guns often have a characteristic pattern of hearing loss referred to as "shooter's ear". They often have a high-frequency loss with better hearing in the low frequencies and one ear is typically worse than the other. The ear on the side the shooter is holding the gun will receive protection from the sound wave from the shoulder while the other ear remains unprotected and more susceptible to the full impact of the sound wave.

The intensity of a gunshot does vary; lower caliber guns are typically on the softer side while higher caliber guns are often louder. The intensity of a gunshot though typically ranges from 140 dB to 175 dB. Indoor shooting also causes loud reverberations which can also be as damaging as the actual gunshot itself. According to the National Institute on Deafness and Other Communication Disorders, noise above 85 dB can begin to cause hearing loss. While many sounds cause damage over time, at the intensity level of a gunshot (140 dB or louder), damage to the ear can occur instantly.

Shooters use custom hearing protection such as electronic type hearing protection for hunters which can amplify soft sounds like leaves crunching while reducing the intensity of the gunshot and custom hearing protection for skeet shooting.

Even with hearing protection, due to the high intensity of the noise guns produce shooters still develop hearing loss over time.

== Legal definitions ==
Firearms include a variety of ranged weapons and there is no agreed-upon definition. For instance, English language laws of nations such as the United States, India, the European Union, Australia and Canada use different definitions. Other English language definitions are provided by international treaties.

=== United States ===
In the United States, a firearm is defined under 18 U.S. Code § 921:

  - (3) The term “firearm” means:
    - (A) any weapon (including a starter gun) which will or is designed to or may readily be converted to expel a projectile by the action of an explosive;
    - (B) the frame or receiver of any such weapon;
    - (C) any firearm muffler or firearm silencer;
    - (D) any destructive device.
  - (5) “Shotgun” means a weapon designed or redesigned, made or remade, and intended to be fired from the shoulder and designed or redesigned and made or remade to use the energy of an explosive to fire through a smooth bore either a number of ball shot or a single projectile for each single pull of the trigger.
  - (7) “Rifle” means a weapon designed or redesigned, made or remade, and intended to be fired from the shoulder and designed or redesigned and made or remade to use the energy of an explosive to fire only a single projectile through a rifled bore for each single pull of the trigger.
  - (30) “Handgun” means—
    - (A) a firearm which has a short stock and is designed to be held and fired by the use of a single hand; and
    - (B) any combination of parts from which a firearm described in subparagraph (A) can be assembled.

Under federal law, antique firearms, like muzzleloaders and their modern replicas, are not considered firearms under the Gun Control Act of 1968, as such they are not regulated by the Bureau of Alcohol, Tobacco, Firearms and Explosives and do not require a background check to purchase or obtain, nor are they required to be shipped to or transferred from a dealer with a Federal Firearms License, nor are convicted felons prohibited from possessing them. The laws governing antique firearms and muzzleloaders vary from state to state, some states such as California and New York require background checks for antique firearms and muzzleloaders, and some states like New Jersey also require a FOID card for all long guns, including muzzleloaders. Some states like Colorado, Connecticut, Delaware, Oregon, Illinois, and Massachusetts (plus the aforementioned states) have laws prohibiting the possession of antique/muzzleloaders by convicted felons.

Antique firearms are defined under 18 U.S. Code § 921(16):

- “Antique firearm” means—
  - (A) any firearm (including any firearm with a matchlock, flintlock, percussion cap, or similar type of ignition system) manufactured in or before 1898; or
  - (B) any replica of any firearm described in subparagraph (A) if such replica—
    - (i) is not designed or redesigned for using rimfire or conventional centerfire fixed ammunition, or
    - (ii) uses rimfire or conventional centerfire fixed ammunition which is no longer manufactured in the United States and which is not readily available in the ordinary channels of commercial trade; or
  - (C) any muzzle loading rifle, muzzle loading shotgun, or muzzle loading pistol, which is designed to use black powder, or a black powder substitute, and which cannot use fixed ammunition. For purposes of this subparagraph, the term “antique firearm” shall not include any weapon which incorporates a firearm frame or receiver, any firearm which is converted into a muzzle loading weapon, or any muzzle loading weapon which can be readily converted to fire fixed ammunition by replacing the barrel, bolt, breechblock, or any combination thereof.

According to the U.S. ATF, if gas pressurization is achieved through mechanical gas compression rather than through chemical propellant combustion, then the device is technically an air gun, not a firearm.

Certain types of firearms deemed to be dangerous, unusual, and more prone to use in crime, such as destructive devices, machine guns, short-barreled rifles, short-barreled shotguns, and suppressors, are strictly regulated under the National Firearms Act of 1934 and Title II of the Gun Control Act of 1968. These firearms are required to be registered with the ATF and require prior ATF approval and passing an enhanced background check before being transferred, firearms defined as destructive devices and machine guns also require a $200 tax to make and transfer.

=== India ===
In India, the Arms Act of 1959 at Chapter I § 2(e) provides a definition of firearms where "firearms" means arms of any description designed or adapted to discharge a projectile or projectiles of any kind by the action of any explosive or other forms of energy, and includes:

- (i) artillery, hand-grenades, riot-pistols or weapons of any kind designed or adapted for the discharge of any noxious liquid, gas, or other such thing,
- (ii) accessories for any such firearm designed or adapted to diminish the noise or flash caused by the firing thereof,
- (iii) parts of, and machinery for manufacturing, fire-arms, and
- (iv) carriages, platforms, and appliances for mounting, transporting and serving artillery;

=== European Union ===
In the European Union, a European Directive amended by EU directive 2017/853 set minimum standards regarding civilian firearms acquisition and possession that EU member states must implement into their national legal systems. In this context, since 2017, firearms are considered as "any portable barrelled weapon that expels, is designed to expel or may be converted to expel a shot, bullet or projectile by the action of a combustible propellant". For legal reasons, objects can be considered a firearm if they have the appearance of a firearm or are made in a way that makes it possible to convert them to a firearm. Member states may be allowed to exclude from their gun control law items such as antique weapons, or specific purposes items that can only be used for that sole purpose.

=== United Kingdom ===
In the UK, a firearm does not have to use a combustible propellant, as explained by Crown Prosecution Service Guidance Firearms. The Firearms Act of 1968 Section 57(1) defines a firearm as:

  - (1) In this Act, the expression “firearm” means—
    - (a) a lethal barrelled weapon (see subsection (1B));
    - (b) a prohibited weapon;
    - (c) a relevant component part in relation to a lethal barrelled weapon or a prohibited weapon (see subsection (1D));
    - (d) an accessory to a lethal barrelled weapon or a prohibited weapon where the accessory is designed or adapted to diminish the noise or flash caused by firing the weapon;
  - (1B) In subsection (1)(a), “lethal barrelled weapon” means a barrelled weapon of any description from which a shot, bullet or other missile, with kinetic energy of more than one joule at the muzzle of the weapon, can be discharged.
  - (1C) Subsection (1) is subject to section 57A (exception for airsoft guns).
  - (1D) For the purposes of subsection (1)(c), each of the following items is a relevant component part in relation to a lethal barrelled weapon or a prohibited weapon—
    - (a) a barrel, chamber or cylinder,
    - (b) a frame, body or receiver,
    - (c) a breech block, bolt or other mechanism for containing the pressure of discharge at the rear of a chamber, but only where the item is capable of being used as a part of a lethal barrelled weapon or a prohibited weapon.

=== Canada ===
In Canada, firearms are legally defined under Section 2 of the Criminal Code (RSC 1985, c. C-46):

"Firearm" means a barrelled weapon from which any shot, bullet, or other projectile can be discharged and that is capable of causing serious bodily injury or death to a person, and includes any frame or receiver of such a barrelled weapon and anything that can be adapted for use as a firearm; (arme à feu)

=== Australia ===
Australia defines firearms under the National Firearms Agreement of 1996, which was updated by the National Firearms Agreement of 2017:

"firearm" means any device, whether or not assembled or in parts —

- (a) which is designed or adapted, or is capable of being modified, to discharge shot or a bullet or other missile by the expansion of gases produced in the device by the ignition of strongly combustible materials or by compressed air or other gases, whether stored in the device in pressurised containers or produced in the device by mechanical means; and
- (b) whether or not operable or complete or temporarily or permanently inoperable or incomplete

— and which is not —

- (c) an industrial tool powered by cartridges containing gunpowder or compressed air or other gases which is designed and intended for use for fixing fasteners or plugs or for similar purposes; or
- (d) a captive bolt humane killer; or
- (e) a spear gun designed for underwater use; or
- (f) a device designed for the discharge of signal flares; or
- (h) a device commonly known as a kiln gun or ringblaster, designed specifically for knocking out or down solid material in kilns, furnaces or cement silos; or
- (i) a device commonly known as a line thrower designed for establishing lines between structures or natural features and powered by compressed air to other compressed gases and used for rescue purposes, rescue training or rescue demonstration; or
- (j) a device of a prescribed class;

=== South Africa ===
In South Africa, Firearms Control Act [No. 60 of 2000] defines firearms since June 2001, with a 2006 amendment of the definition:

'firearm' means any-

- (a) device manufactured or designed to propel a bullet or projectile through a barrel or cylinder by means of burning propellant, at a muzzle energy exceeding 8 joules (6 ft-lbs);
- (b) device manufactured or designed to discharge rim-fire, centre-fire or pin-fire ammunition;
- (c) device which is not at the time capable of discharging any bullet or projectile, but which can be readily altered to be a firearm within the meaning of paragraph (a) or (b);
- (d) device manufactured to discharge a bullet or any other projectile of a calibre of 5.6 mm (.22 calibre) or higher at a muzzle energy of more than 8 joules (6 ft-lbs), by means of compressed gas and not by means of burning propellant; or [Para. (d) substituted by s. 1 (b) of Act 43 of 2003.]
- (e) barrel, frame or receiver of a device referred to in paragraphs (a), (b), (c) or (d), but does not include a muzzle loading firearm or any device contemplated in section 5;

=== International treaties ===
An inter-American convention defines firearms as:

- any barreled weapon which will or is designed to or may be readily converted to expel a bullet or projectile by the action of an explosive, except antique firearms manufactured before the 20th Century or their replicas; or
- any other weapon or destructive device such as any explosive, incendiary or gas bomb, grenade, rocket, rocket launcher, missile, missile system, or mine.

An international UN protocol on firearms considers that

"Firearm" shall mean any portable barrelled weapon that expels, is designed to expel or may be readily converted to expel a shot, bullet or projectile by the action of an explosive, excluding antique firearms or their replicas. Antique firearms and their replicas shall be defined in accordance with domestic law. In no case, however, shall antique firearms include firearms manufactured after 1899

== See also ==
Firearm science and technology

- Ballistics (Internal ballistics, Transitional ballistics, External ballistics, Terminal ballistics)
- Electrothermal-chemical technology
- Firearm action
- Glossary of firearms terms
- Gunsmith
- Physics of firearms
- Vertical forward grip
- Precision-guided firearm

Firearms and society

- Air travel with firearms and ammunition
- Celebratory gunfire
- Firearms law and Gun politics
- Firearms ownership
- Gun control, Small arms trade and Right to keep and bear arms
- Gun serial number
- Gun violence
- Index of gun politics articles
- Open carry and Concealed carry
- Overview of gun laws by nation
- Saturday night special
- Shooting range
- Shooting sport
- List of firearms
- List of aircraft weapons
- List of battle rifles
- List of World War II infantry weapons
- List of firearm brands
- List of infantry weapons of World War I
- List of pistols
- List of secondary and special-issue World War II infantry weapons
- List of shotguns
- List of sniper rifles
- List of submachine guns
- List of weapons of military aircraft of Germany during World War II

Firearms organizations

- List of shooting sports organizations
- World Forum on Shooting Activities
- International Biathlon Union
- International Shooting Sport Federation
- Federation of Associations for Hunting and Conservation of the EU
