= Marine Scout Sniper Rifle =

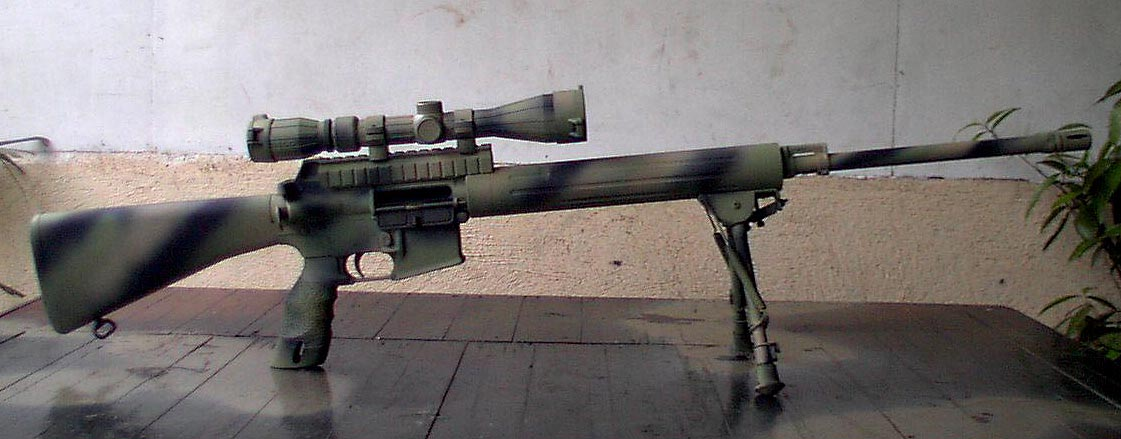
- A 3rd generation Marine Scout Sniper Rifle in green camo paint.
- Type: Designated marksman rifle
- Place of origin: Philippines

Service history
- In service: 1996–present
- Used by: Philippine Marine Corps; Naval Special Operations Group
- Wars: Anti-guerrilla operations in Visayas and Mindanao

Production history
- Designer: Lieutenant Colonel Roberto Emmanuel T. Feliciano and Colonel Jonathan C. Martir (Philippine Marine Corps)
- Designed: 1996
- Manufacturer: Philippine Marine Corps (historical); Government Arsenal (current)
- Produced: 1996
- Variants: See Variants

Specifications
- Mass: 10 lbs (4.55 kg)
- Length: 42.25 in. (1073 mm)
- Barrel length: 24 in. (610 mm)
- Crew: 1
- Cartridge: 5.56×45mm NATO
- Caliber: 5.56 mm (.223 in)
- Action: Gas-operated, closed rotating bolt, Stoner bolt and carrier piston
- Muzzle velocity: 2,953 ft/s (900 m/s)
- Effective firing range: 600 m - 800 m
- Feed system: 20 - 30 round STANAG Magazines.
- Sights: Any Picatinny rail-compatible scope/sights

The Marine Scout Sniper Rifle (MSSR) is a Philippine semi-automatic designated marksman rifle developed by the Philippine Marine Corps for their Marine Scout Snipers. Designed in the mid-1990s to replace severely-outdated battle rifles then used as marksman rifles, the MSSR is essentially an M16A1 that has been heavily modified and accurized to serve as a marksman rifle.

Since its introduction, marksman rifles that are derivatives of the MSSR have been designed for other purposes by the Armed Forces of the Philippines, namely the Night Fighting Weapon System (NFWS), an integrally-suppressed variant for night combat; the Special Purpose Rifle (SPR), a variant for the Philippine Army; and the Squad Designated Marksman Rifle (SDMR), a carbine variant.

== Development ==
The system was developed in-house under the direction of then Col. Jonathan Martir, PN (M) (GSC), N-6 in 1996 to replace the M1C Garand and M14 rifle, which were still in Philippine service as marksman rifles. The MSSR was designed in-house by Lt. Col. Roberto Emmanuel T. Feliciano and Col. Johnathan C. Martir.

The MSSR was developed due to the need of a sniper rifle system that could effectively use 5.56×45mm NATO ammunition (most other sniper rifles use the larger 7.62×51mm NATO cartridge). This was done mainly for cost-saving and availability reasons since the Armed Forces of the Philippines are actively engaged in counter-insurgency and internal security operations, especially against the Moro Islamic Liberation Front (MILF), Abu Sayyaf Group and occasionally, the communist New People's Army.

The shorter effective range of the 5.56 mm cartridge compared to the 7.62 mm was less of a factor due to the shorter ranges encountered in jungle combat, where the rifle is primarily used. Its performance during subsequent combat operations proved the effectiveness of the weapon system, and it was adopted as the primary range sniper rifle (for ranges of up to 600 m) of the Philippine Marine Scout Snipers.

Originally intended to be a temporary solution and slated to be delegated as a designated marksman's rifle upon the acquisition of newer 7.62 mm bolt-action rifles, the MSSR has instead become the primary sniper rifle of the Marine Scout Snipers due to its outstanding performance in the field.

The deployment of the MSSR also allowed the Philippine Marine Corps to retire its M1903 Springfield, M1C Garand and M14 rifles from active service.

=== Ammunition ===
The first-generation MSSR used either factory 5.56mm NATO 62-grain SS109 ball ammunition or 69-grain Federal Match Gold Medal boattail hollowpoint (BTHP) cartridges.

The second-generation rifle may use these rounds as well as the HSM 69-grain BTHP cartridge.

The third-generation MSSR uses 5.56mm 69-grain Hornady BTHP Match or 75-grain Hornady TAP BTHP Match ammunition handloaded at the Marine Scout Sniper School.

== Variants ==
The first generation MSSR was deployed in 1996 as an M16A1 with a Tasco variable 3-9 x 40 mm rubber-coated scope on a DPMS Tri-mount atop the carry handle. This required a Delta HBAR cheek piece on the stock to align the operator's eye with the elevated scope position. The standard handguards were replaced with a free-floating aluminum forearm, and a Harris folding bipod was attached to the underside of the forearm. The standard M16A1 barrel was replaced with a free-floated 24" (68 cm) DPMS Heavy Stainless Steel Ultra Match barrel with a 1 in 8.5" right-hand twist, with an M16A1 front sight base. A J&P match trigger was installed, which is later used in the second and third generation versions.

The second generation MSSR was created by removing the forward portion of the carry handle and attaching the Tri-mount directly to the top of the upper receiver. The Tasco scope and scope rings were attached to the Tri-mount, which provided a lower scope-to-bore height. The Delta HBAR cheek piece was no longer required and was removed. The M16A1 front sight base was removed and replaced with a DPMS gas block. The barrel was changed to a DPMS Ultra Match barrel with a 1 in 8" RH twist, and the M16A1 stock and pistol grip were replaced with A2 versions.

The third generation rifle, introduced in 2004, retained the second generation features but replaced the Tasco scope with a Bushnell variable 3-9 x 40mm scope with a Mil-dot reticle, mounted with three scope rings on the receiver-mounted Tri-mount. For the Philippine Marine Corps, barrel length remained the same at 24" with the 1 in 8" DPMS Ultra Match Barrel. A version with a 20" barrel was made available for the Naval Special Operations Group.

The fourth generation rifles, introduced in 2016, feature a Leupold Mark 4 LR/T M3 scope mounted on a Leupold mount, an 18-inch cold hammer-forged Daniel Defense barrel, a JP match trigger, a Harris swivel bi-pod, a tactical charging handle latch, ambidextrous fire controls, an extended trigger guard and a Magpul Precision-Adjustable stock. It also comes issued with an AAC SR-5 suppressor, 20-round Magpul magazines and a Pelican carrying case.

The fifth generation rifles, introduced in 2017, added a full-length railed handguard.

== Derivative weapons ==
=== Night Fighting Weapon System ===
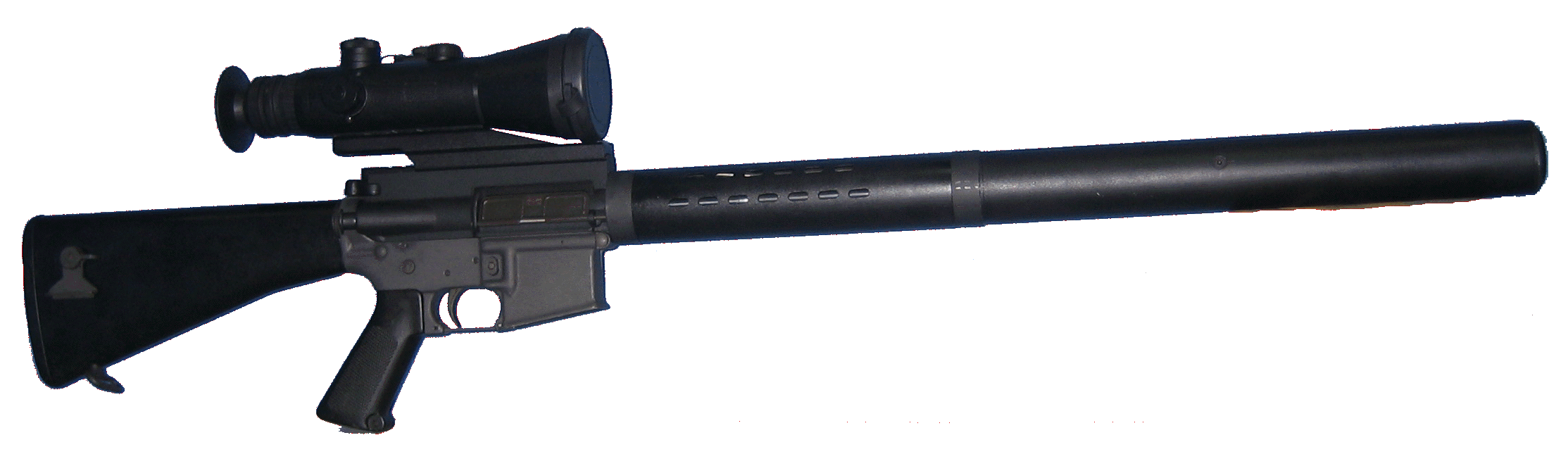
Night Fighting Weapon System with integral suppressor and mounted Litton Model M845 MkII Night Vision Sight.

Created in late 2004, the Night Fighting Weapon System (NFWS) was made for the purpose of fighting in forested areas in low-light conditions.

The rifle is equipped with an integral sound suppressor fabricated in-house out of stainless steel. The suppressor is fitted on a bull barrel (1 inch in diameter) with a 1 in 9" twist.

=== Special Purpose Rifle ===
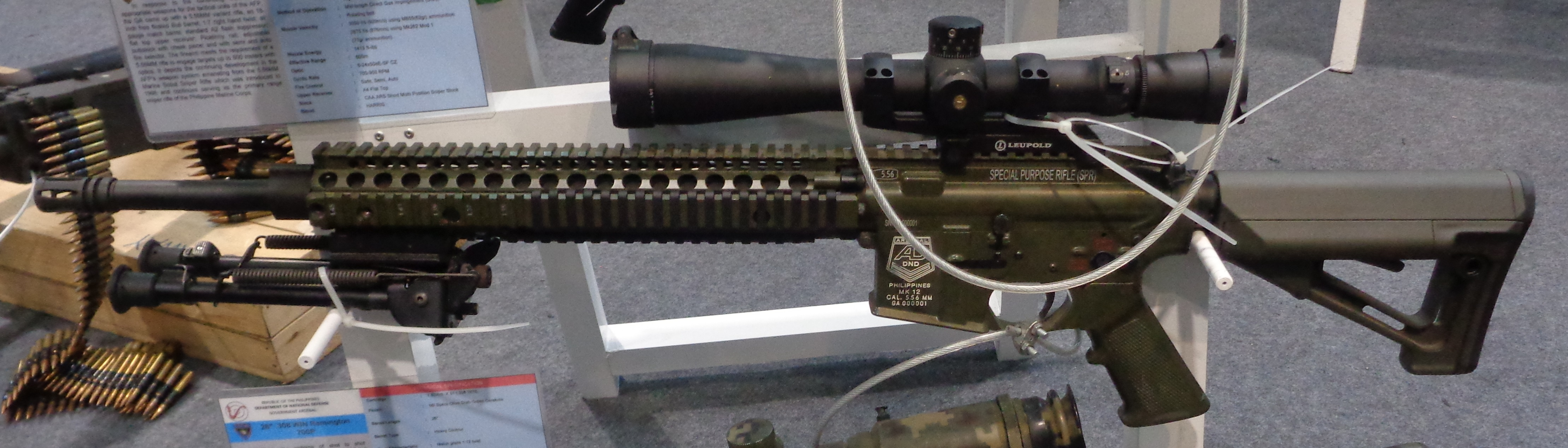
Special Purpose Rifle on display at the Government Arsenal booth at 25th AFAD Defense & Sporting Arms Show.

The Special Purpose Rifle (SPR) is a designated marksman rifle intended to "meet the requirement for a 5.56mm rifle to engage targets up to 800 meters with optics". This rifle would replace the older M14s used as designated marksman rifles in the Philippine Army.

The new rifle will feature an 18" free-floating bull barrel with a 1 in 7" twist, a standard A2 flash suppressor, a flattop upper receiver with a Picatinny rail, provisions for a bipod and semi and select fire.

The new variant, designated the "Government Arsenal SPR/DMR" was slated to go into service in 2015, with the production of the initial batch of rifles.

=== Squad Designated Marksman Rifle ===
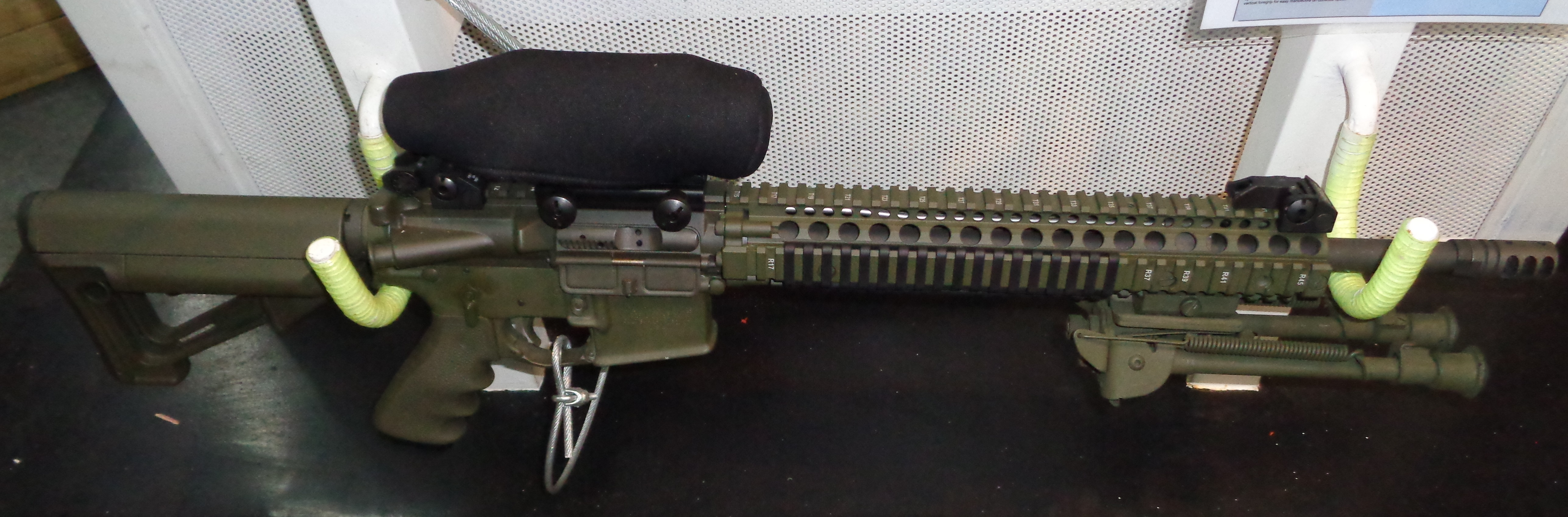
Squad Designated Marksman Rifle on display at the Government Arsenal booth at the 23rd AFAD gun show.

The Squad Designated Marksman Rifle (SDMR) is a mid-length carbine similar in configuration to the SEAL Recon Rifle. It features a railed upper receiver, a mid-length gas system, a Daniel Defense 16-inch cold-hammer forged barrel, a Daniel Defense free-floating railed handguard, a 4x32 Trijicon Advanced Combat Optic, a Magpul STR buttstock, a Hogue foregrip with a cleaning kit, and a cerakote finish.

Developed as one of the Government Arsenal's firearms research & development initiatives, an initial batch of 40 units of this carbine were built and turned over to selected AFP Special Operations Forces (SOF) and the Scout Rangers in June of 2015 for testing and evaluation. The SDMR was subsequently ordered by other AFP units.

== Deployment ==
The MSSR is the main weapon of choice for the Philippine Marine Scout Snipers alongside the newer Remington 700P Intermediate Range Day-Night Scout Sniper Rifle and the Barrett M95 anti materiel rifle.

Sniper teams usually work in pairs with the operator accompanied by a spotter, usually equipped with an M16A2 rifle with an M203 grenade launcher.

== Gallery ==
Marine Scout Sniper Rifle
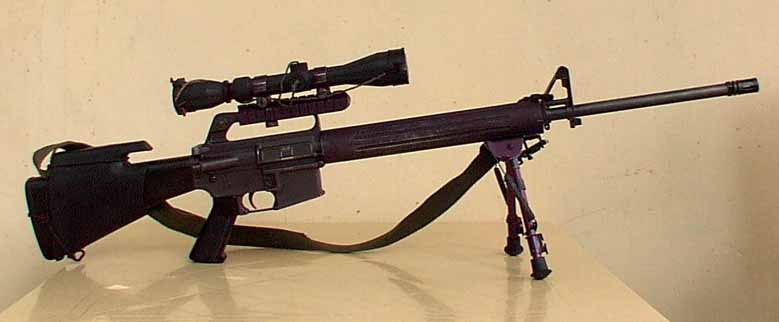
MSSR Gen 1

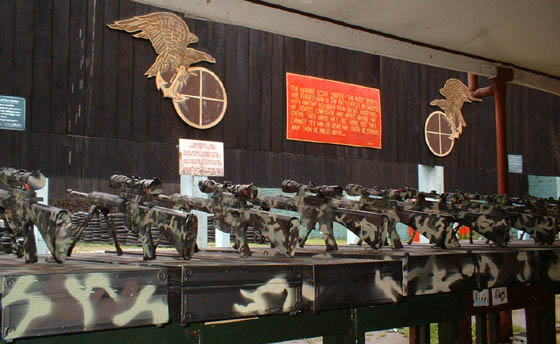
MSSR Gen 3 rifles

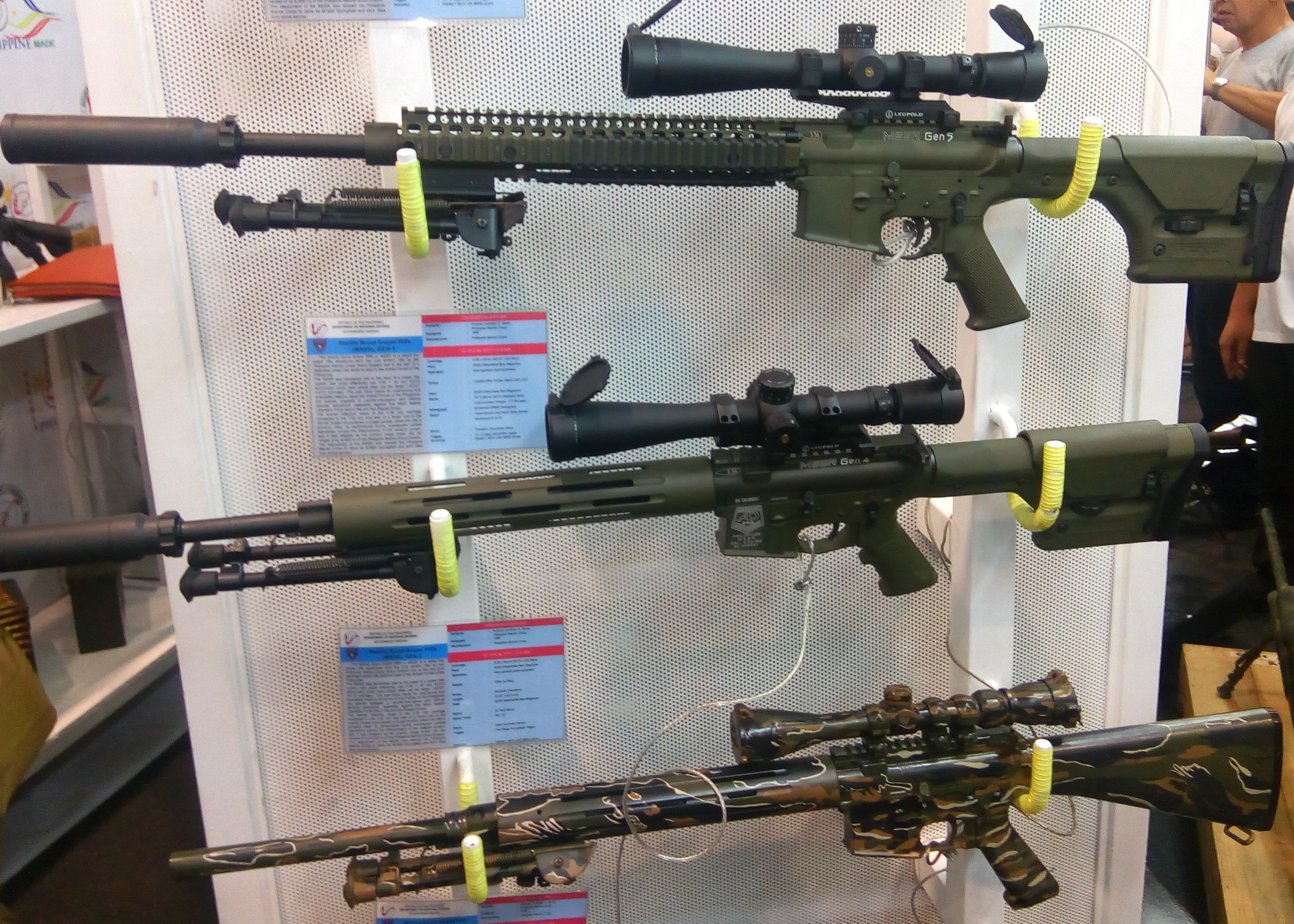
Gen 3, 4 & 5 Marine Scout Sniper Rifles on display.

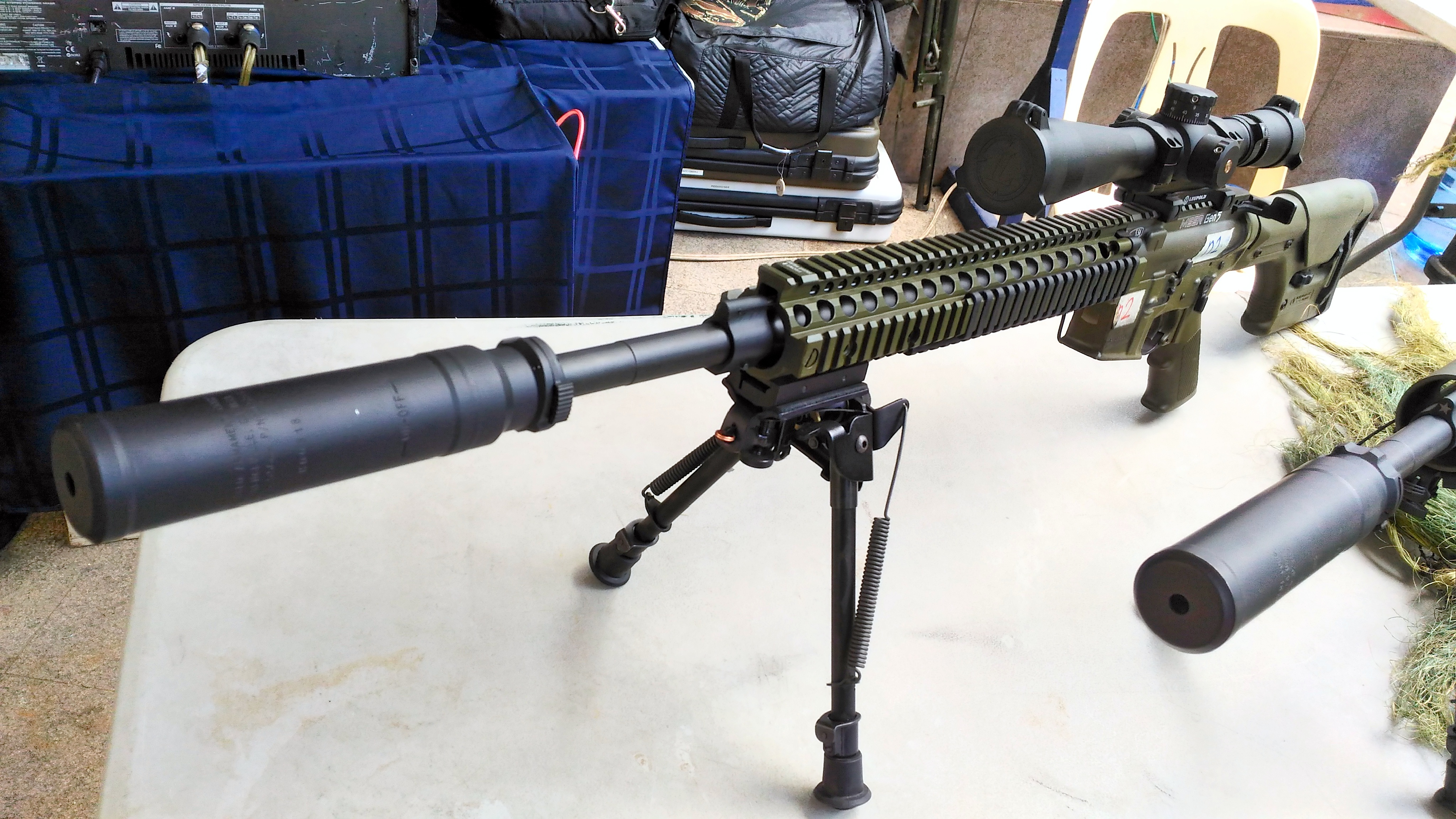
MSSR Gen 5

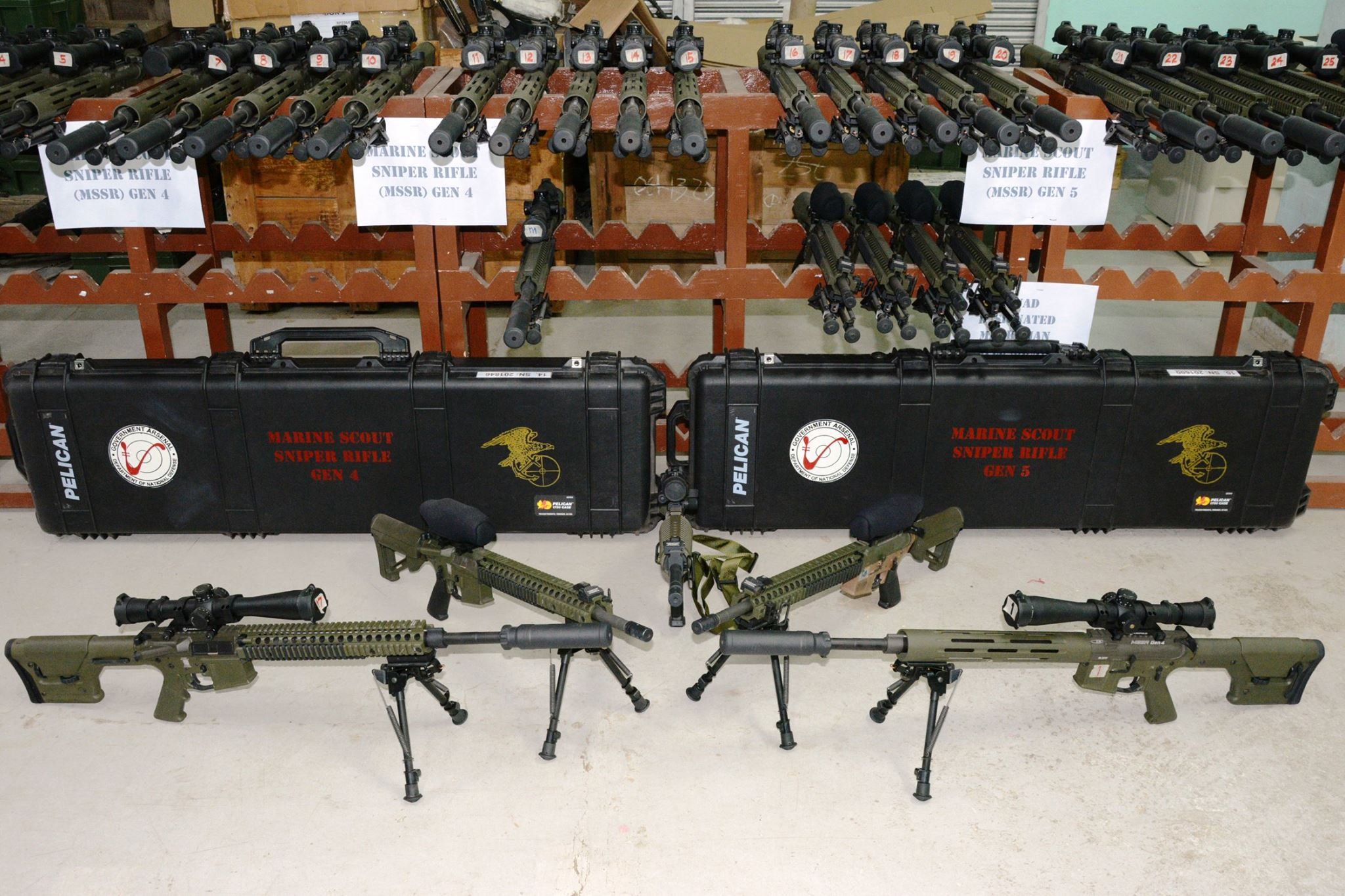
Government Arsenal rifles on display.

== See also ==
- Squad Designated Marksman Rifle
- Squad Advanced Marksman Rifle
- Mk 12 Special Purpose Rifle
