= Marksman =

Person who is skilled in shooting

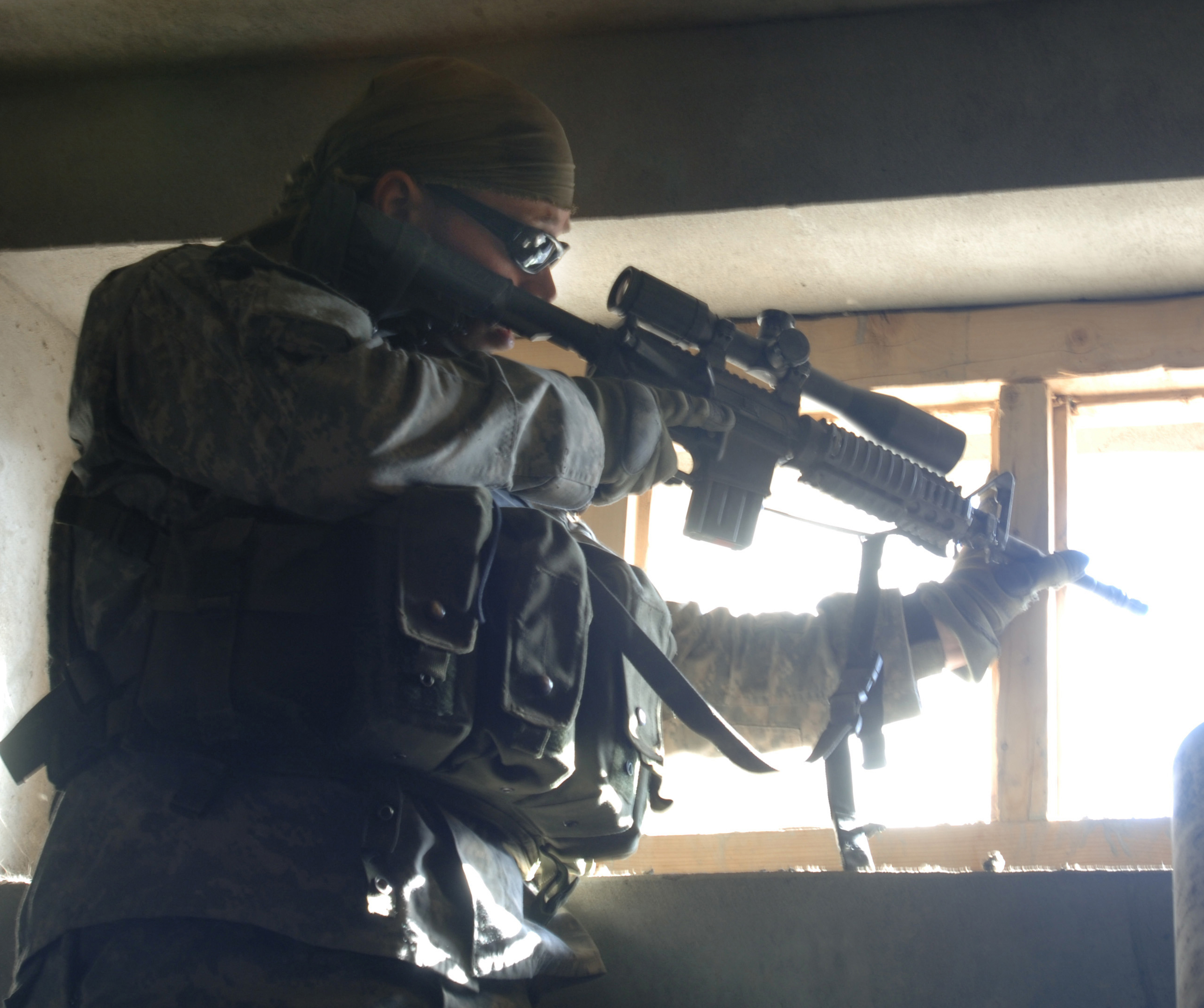
An American marksman looks for enemy activity along the hilltops near Dur Baba District, Afghanistan (2006)

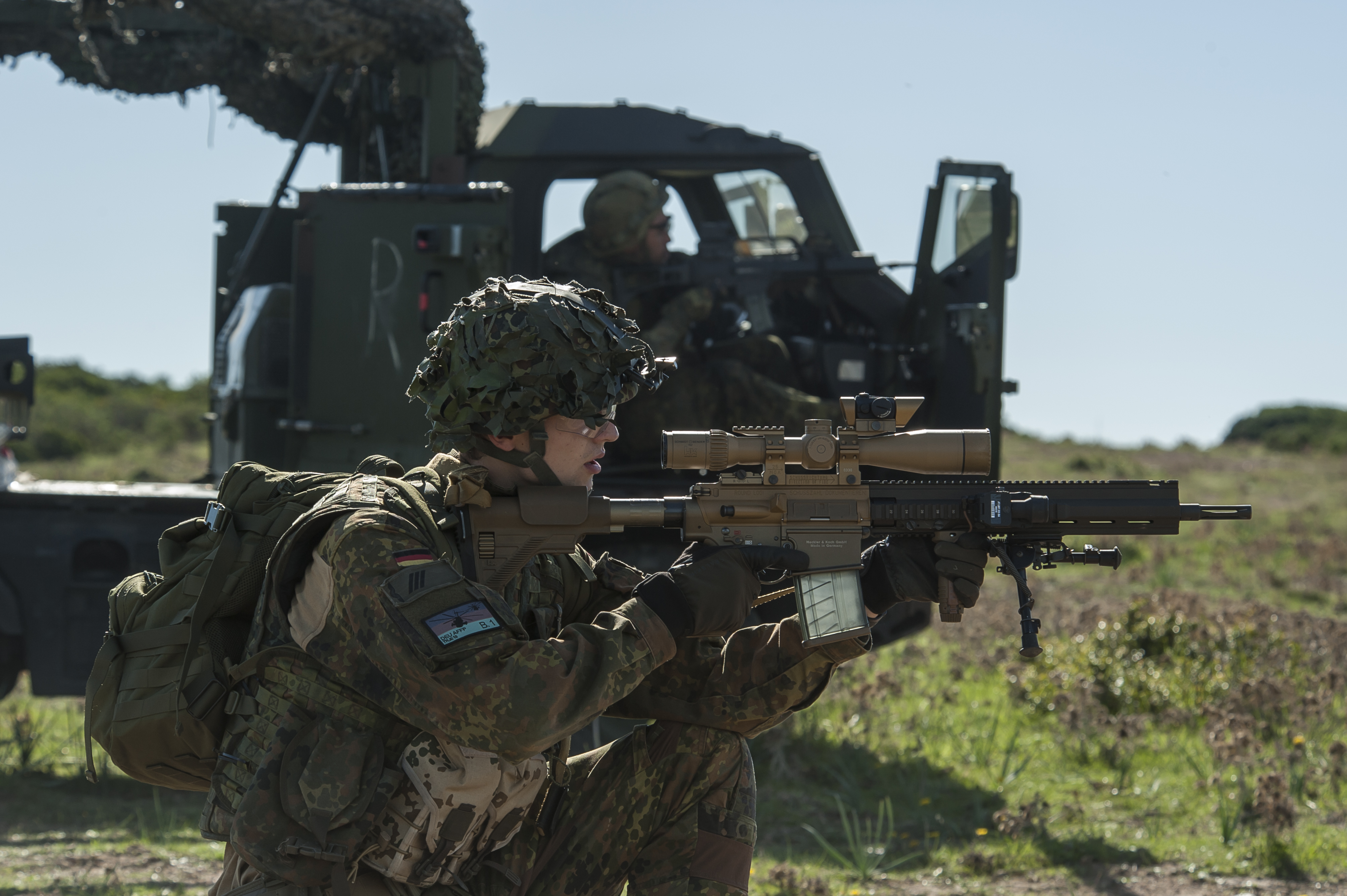
A soldier with a G28 of the German Army

A marksman is a person who is skilled in precision shooting. In modern military usage this typically refers to the use of projectile weapons such as an accurized scoped long gun such as designated marksman rifle, sniper rifle and anti-materiel rifle to shoot at high-value targets at longer-than-usual ranges.

The proficiency in precision shooting is known as a shooter's marksmanship, which can be used to describe both gunnery and archery.

== Description ==
In common usage, "sharpshooter" and "marksman" are synonymous. Within the specialized fields of shooting sports and military usage, however, sharpshooter and marksman each refer to different levels of skill. Specifically, in the US Army, "marksman" is a rating below "sharpshooter" and "expert". Four levels of skill are generally recognized today in American military and civilian shooting circles: unqualified, marksman, sharpshooter, and expert. Marksmanship badges for the three qualified levels are commonly awarded to both civilian and military shooters who attain proficiency in shooting higher than "unqualified".

The main difference between military marksmen and snipers is that marksmen are usually considered an organic part of a fireteam of soldiers and are never expected to operate independently away from the main force, whereas snipers are special ops troops who usually work alone or in very small teams with independent mission objectives. Snipers are also often tasked with responsibilities other than delivering long-range fire – specifically, conducting reconnaissance, battle damage assessment and spotting for coordinates/corrections for artillery fire or air strikes. Within the military, marksmen are sometimes attached to an infantry fireteam or squad (where they are known as designated marksmen) where they support the squad by providing accurate long-range shots at valuable targets as needed, thus extending the effective tactical reach of the fireteam or squad.

== Middle Ages ==
In the Middle Ages, in the first use of the term 'marksman' was given to the royal archers, or bowmen, of a palace guard, which was an elite group of troops chosen to guard a royal palace or the royalty. This was around the 10th century, although records of some 9th century English Kings show the listings of groups of marksmen specifically chosen for their militaries.

== Marksmen in different countries ==
=== Australia ===
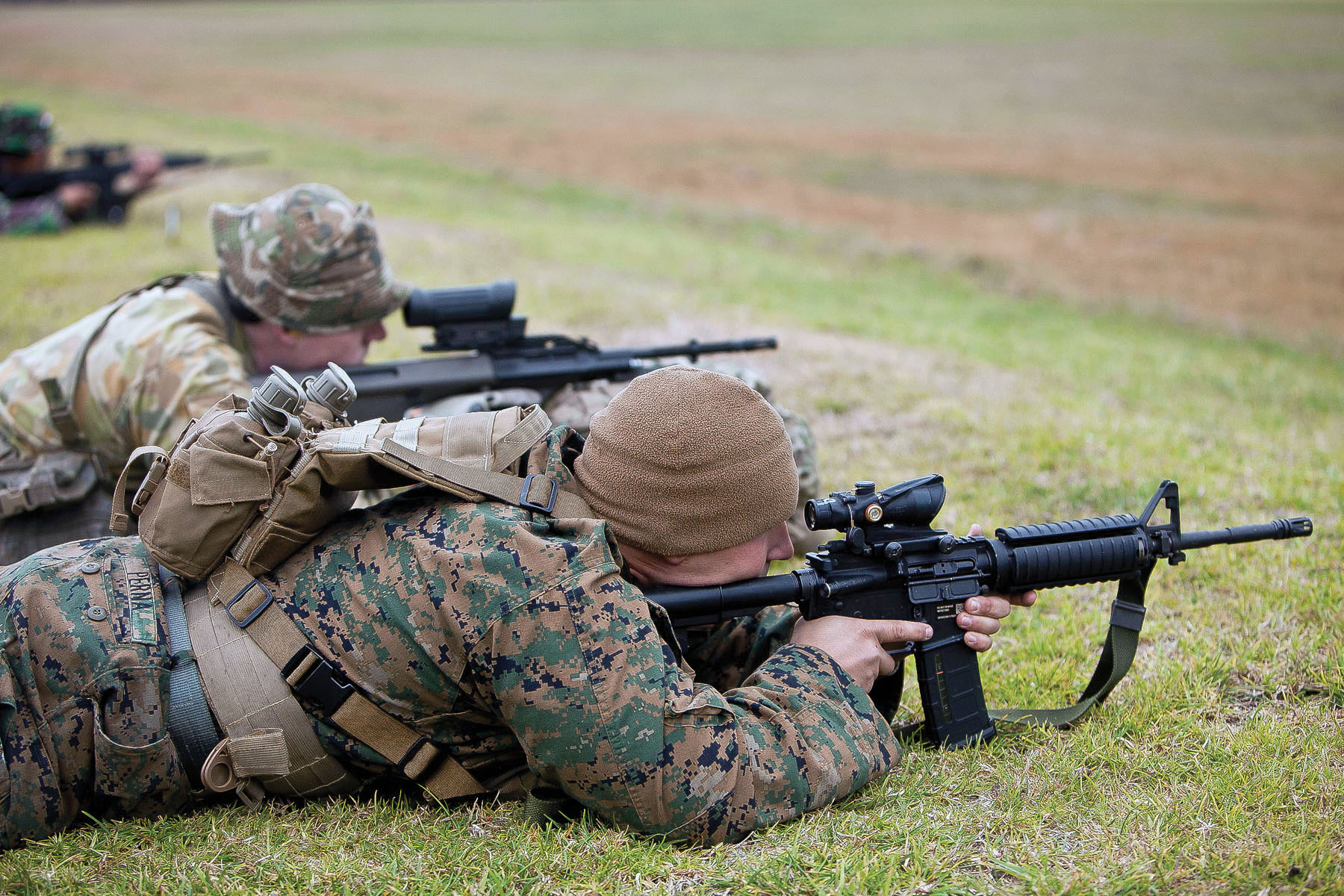
Marksmen competing in Australia

In the Australian Army, marksmanship is currently recognized by the award of one of three skill-at-arms badges. The 'Skill at Arms Badge' consists of a representation of crossed .303 Short Magazine Lee–Enfield (SMLE) rifles and is awarded for achieving a prescribed standard of shooting skill. This must be repeated within twelve months for the badge to be awarded in perpetuity to the recipient. The 'Sniper's Badge' is similar in design but incorporates the letter 'S' into the design and is awarded to soldiers who qualify on the Army Sniper's Course. The 'Army Top 20 Badge' consists of crossed .303 SMLE rifles upon a laurel wreath and is awarded to the final 20 competitors in the annual Champion Shot for the Army. The winner of this competition is also awarded the Champion Shots Medal. Only one badge may be worn.

=== United Kingdom ===
In the British Armed Forces, "marksman" is traditionally the highest shooting rating and holders may wear a crossed rifles badge on the lower sleeve.

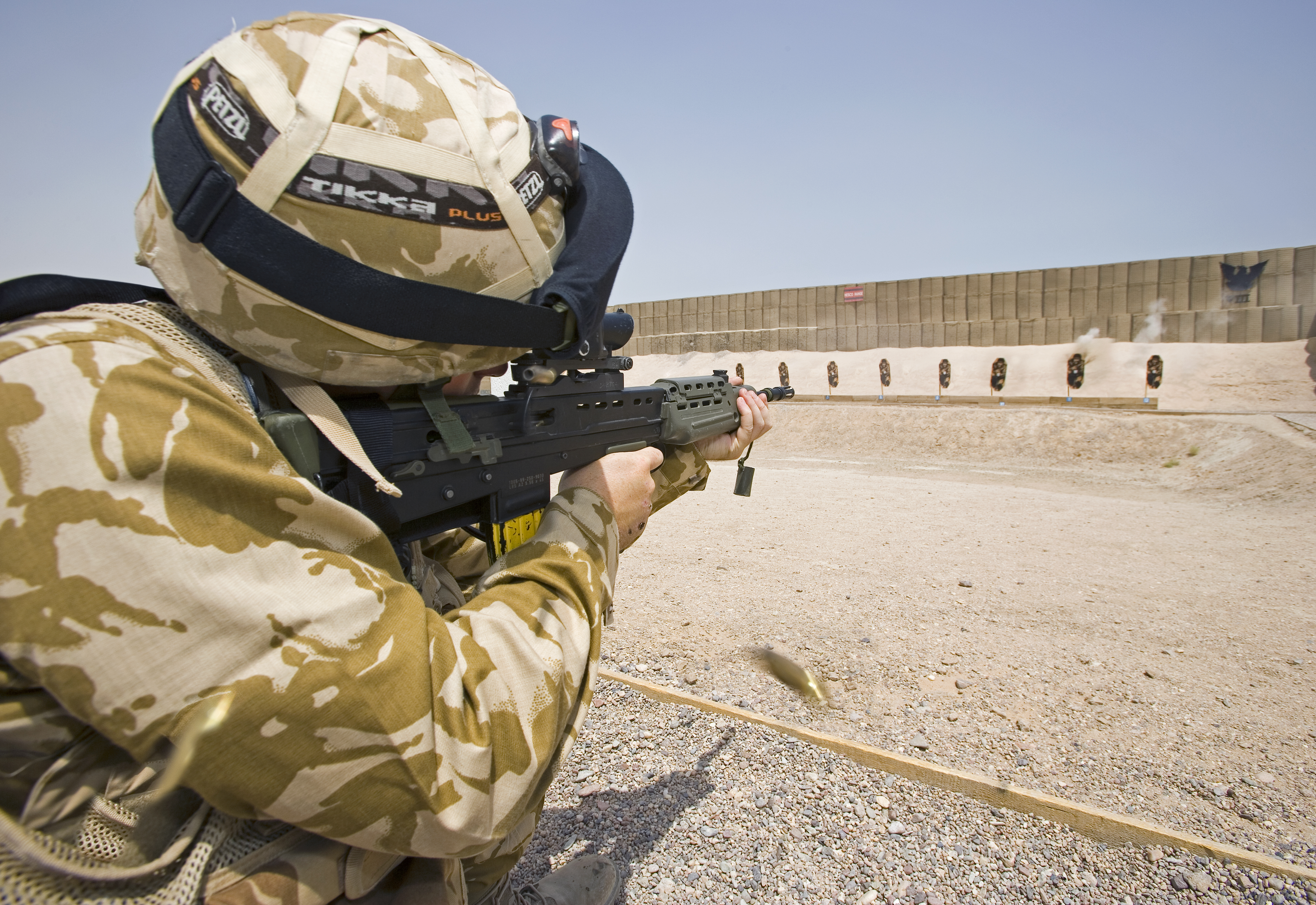
A British soldier aims on a shooting range in Iraq, 29 July 2006.

From Army Operational Shooting Policy for the Annual Personal Weapons Test (APWT) Combat Infantryman (CI):Marksman (Combat Infantryman). To qualify for Marksman all practices are to be completed and the firer must achieve a score of 55 (85%) or more of the total Highest Possible Score (65) for the entire shoot. Soldiers achieving a non-marksman passing score are not permitted to re-shoot practices in order to qualify for Marksman. Infantry soldiers who qualify as Marksmen during the Combat Infantryman's Course (CIC) are entitled to retain the award on joining their units. Soldiers who qualify as Marksmen are entitled to wear the Marksman badge for one year before they must requalify. (Page 3 - 70, Amdt 1/Feb/07)

=== United States ===
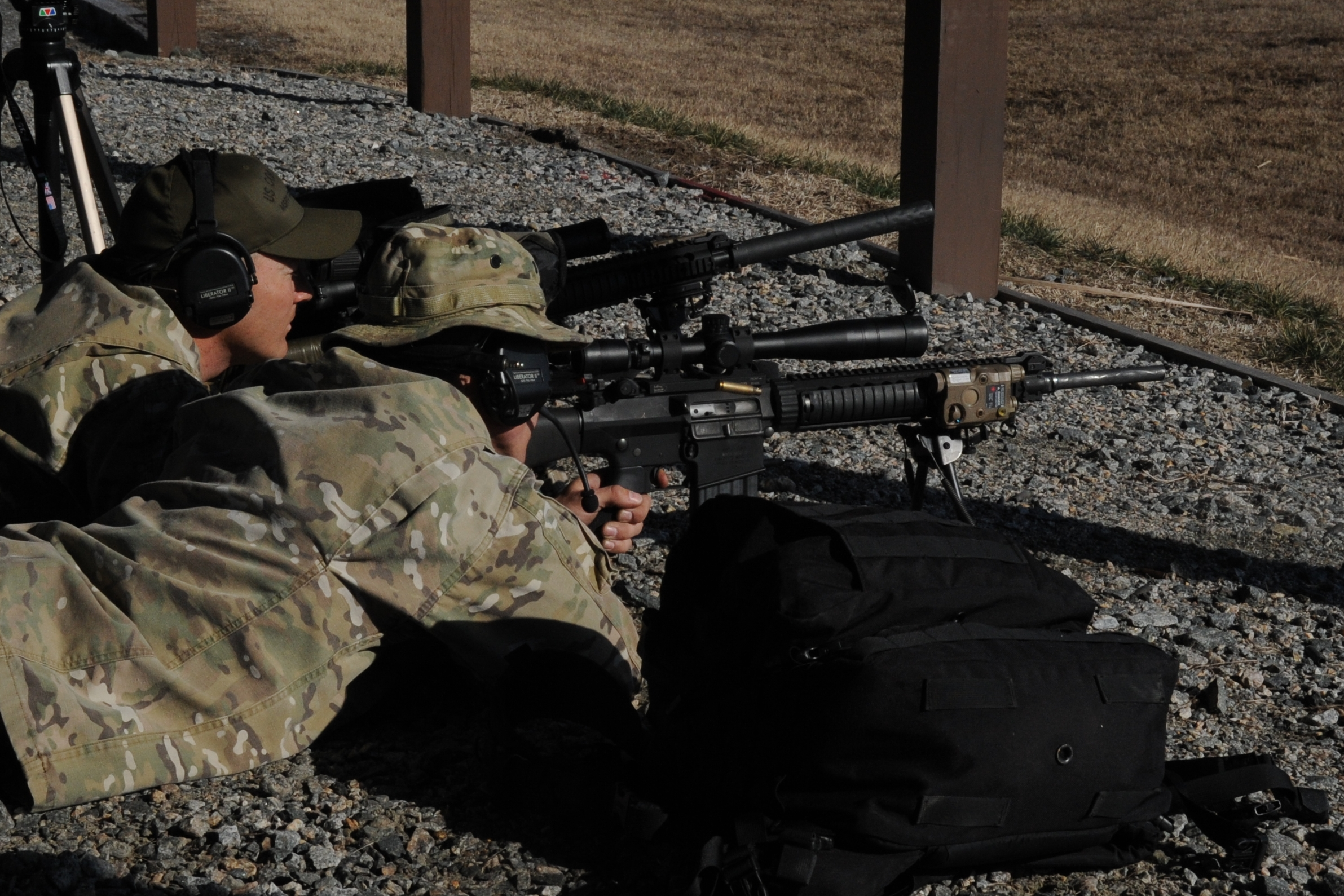
Coast Guard Deployable Specialized Forces MSRT Precision Marksmen Observer Team

In the United States Army and Marine Corps, the marksmanship of the soldiers is ranked based on their skill: marksman-sharpshooter-expert. Holders of each level wear qualification badges below their ribbons with bars for the weapons they qualify in. In the United States Navy and the United States Coast Guard, full-sized medals are only issued at the expert level. Both services award separate medals for pistol and rifle proficiency. The United States Air Force gives just a ribbon for qualifying at the expert level, although a bronze star can be earned if the wearer qualifies on both of these types of small arms.

Within the United States military, a marksman in the U.S. Army is referred to as "Squad Designated Marksman" (SDM), and a marksman in the Marines is called a "Designated Marksman" (DM). The United States Army particularly emphasizes the fireteam concept: according to US Army Field Manual 3-21.8 (Infantry Rifle Platoon and Squad, formerly FM 7-8) a typical United States Army fireteam consists of four soldiers. In the context of a Stryker Brigade Combat Team (SBCT)'s Infantry Rifle Companies, one man from each fireteam in a rifle squad is either the Squad Anti-armor Specialist (RMAT), armed with the FGM-148 Javelin, or the Squad Designated Marksman (DM), who carries the M4 carbine and M14 rifle. In both cases this specialized function replaces the basic rifleman position in the fireteam.

=== Canada ===
As with other Commonwealth armies, the Marksman in the Canadian Army is a shooting achievement recognized by a badge bearing the monarch's crown and crossed .303 Lee–Enfield No. 4, Mk I rifles. On operations within the Canadian Infantry Battalion, rifle company designated marksman can be assigned. This is not to be confused with Canadian sniper designation; these attain a high level of marksmanship and fieldcraft through grueling selected courses. Candidates must achieve recce qualification and marksman designation before being considered for the basic sniper course.

=== India ===
The Indian Army uses a locally manufactured licensed variant of the SVD Dragunov in the Designated Marksman role as part of each infantry platoon. The Dragunov is used in conjunction with the INSAS family of weapons to give flexibility and striking power at short to mid range firefights, to Indian Army infantry units engaged with opposing forces.

The Army Marksmanship Unit trains members for sports shooting as well as military shooting.

== Civilian marksman ==
=== United States ===
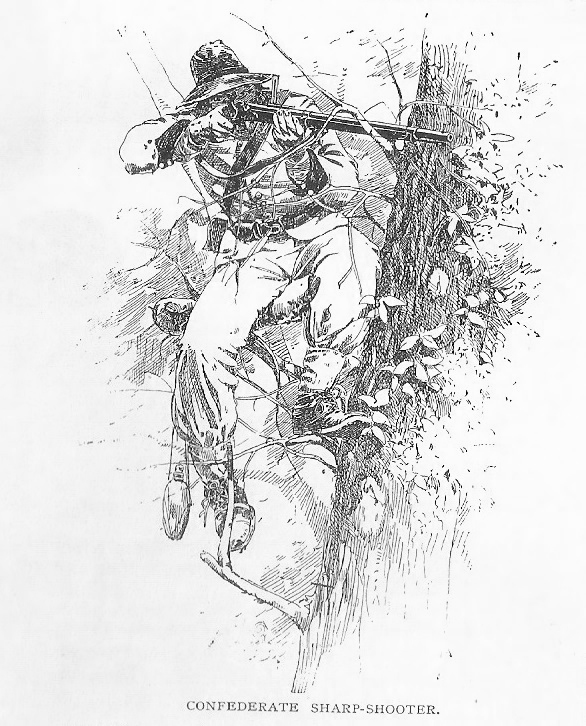
Sharpshooter from confederate state in the Century Magazine, c.1885

The United States has a long tradition of marksmanship going back to its beginnings including the role of common men in its Revolutionary War. There are several organizations which promote civilian marksmanship including the Civilian Marksmanship Program which began just after the turn of the 20th century as a government chartered program and the Division of Civilian Marksmanship. One of the newest and currently the fastest growing marksmanship programs in North America is Project Appleseed which was started by the Revolutionary War Veterans Association in 2006. Shooters who score 210 out of 250 or better on the "Quick and Dirty" Appleseed AQT earn the Rifleman designation and are issued a Rifleman patch. Similar to the U.S. military marksmanship ratings of Unqualified, Marksman, Sharpshooter, and Expert (see Marksmanship Badge (United States)), the Appleseed ratings have the same levels, with the exception that instead of "Expert", the equivalent performance level is called "Rifleman".

The National Rifle Association of America was founded in 1871 to improve the marksmanship of American riflemen. Despite it being known contemporarily as a political advocacy organization for gun rights, the NRA continues to host marksmanship competitions and gun sports in the United States. A different organization, USA Shooting, organizes American shooting sports at the Olympic level.

== Longest recorded competition rifle shot ==
The longest recorded shot in a shooting contest was 3.781 kilometres (2.35 miles), on March 27, 2021 in Barnard, Kansas by an American competitive shooter. The bullet flew for 9.4 seconds and hit the upper-left corner of a six-foot square (36 square feet, about 2 square meters) steel target. The rifle used was a GA Precision Custom, with a Nightforce ATACR 7-35×56 scope, on a bipod. Ammunition was Hornady .338-caliber 300-grain A-Tip.

== See also ==
- Exhibition shooting
- Reconnaissance
- United States Marine Corps Scout Sniper
- Skirmisher
- Sniper

Related military operations

- Jäger (military)
- Operation Foxley - plan to kill Adolf Hitler using a sniper
- Sniper Alley
- South Armagh Sniper (1990–1997)
- Snipers of the Soviet Union
- Special forces

Related military weapons

- Anti-materiel rifle
- Anti-tank rifle
- Designated marksman rifle
- Dragunov Sniper Rifle
- M21, the scoped and accurized version of the M14.
- Sniper rifle
- SR-25, designed by Knight's Armament Company
- United States Marine Corps Designated Marksman Rifle
- Squad Designated Marksman Rifle
- Squad Advanced Marksman Rifle
- Mk 12 Special Purpose Rifle
