= Designated marksman =

Marksman in a military infantry squad

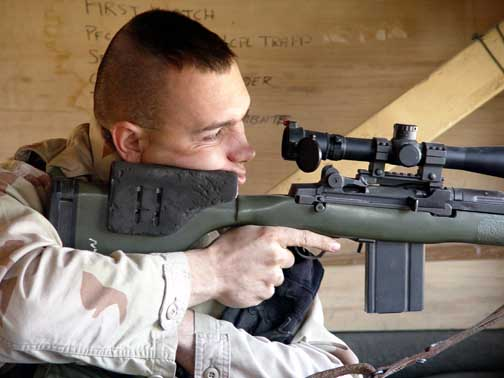
US Marine Corps Designated Marksman, armed with the Designated Marksman Rifle (DMR), derived from an M14 rifle with a telescopic sight.

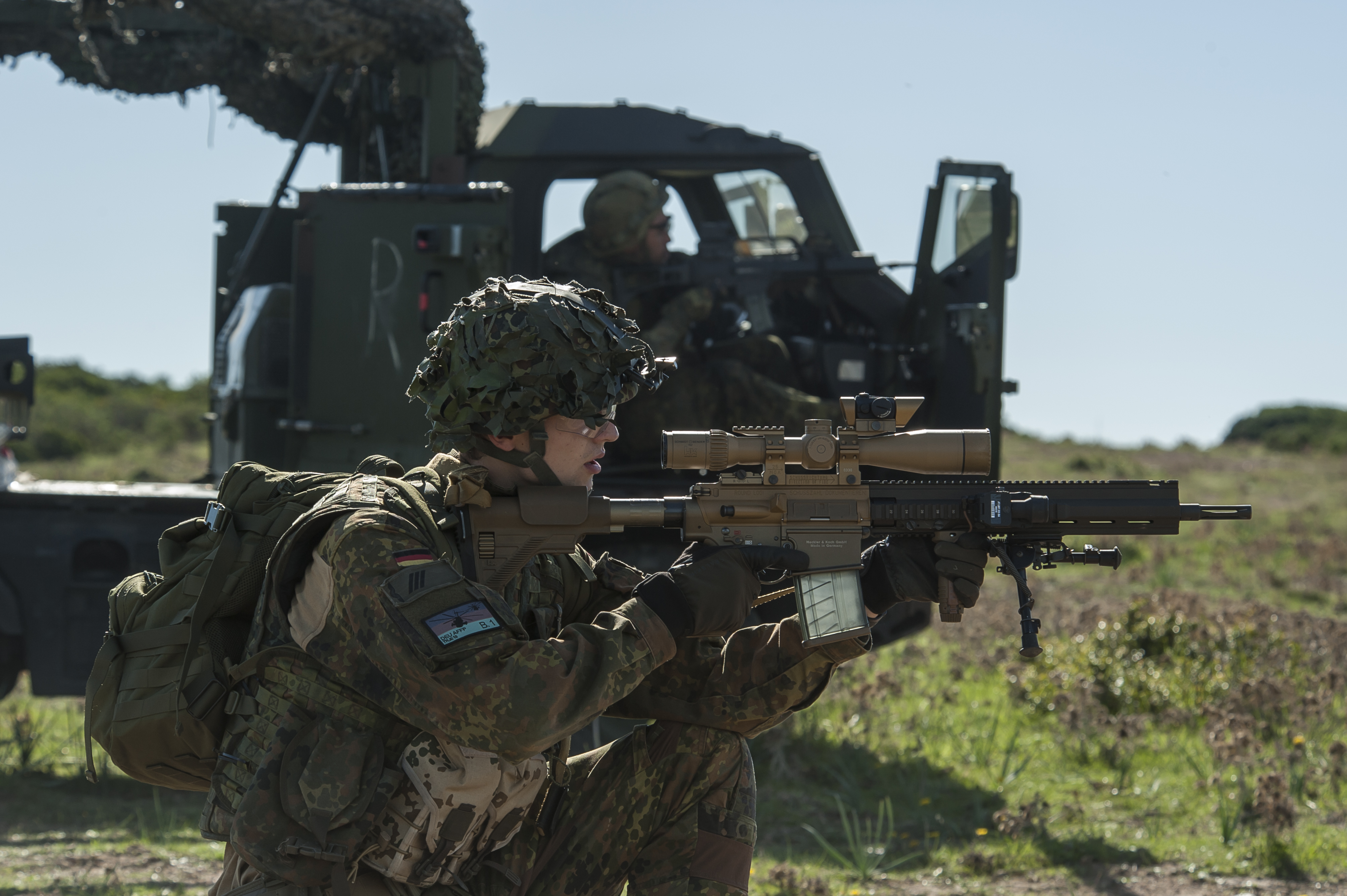
A soldier with a G28 of the German Air Force

A designated marksman (DM), squad advanced marksman (AD) or squad designated marksman (SDM) is a military marksman role in an infantry squad. The term sniper was used in Soviet doctrine although the soldiers using the Dragunov SVD were the first to use a specifically designed designated marksman rifle.

The DM's role is to supplement the attached squad by providing accurate fire upon enemy targets at distances up to 600 metres (660 yd). Due to the need for repeated effective fire, the DM is usually equipped with a scoped semi-automatic rifle called a designated marksman rifle (DMR). Like snipers, DMs are trained in scouting and precise shooting, but unlike the more specialized "true" sniper (who often operate independently), they operate as an intrinsic part of an infantry fireteam and are tasked to lay down accurate support fire at valuable targets as per tactical necessity, thus extending the reach of the fireteam.

The growth of the DM rifle can be attributed to two main influences; the near-universal adoption of intermediate cartridges, such as 5.56×45mm, 5.45×39mm, and 7.62×39mm for standard service rifles, which limit the typical effective range of a standard infantryman to within 200–300 metres (220–330 yd); and the increasing specialization over the last 15 years (mid-2000s to late 2010s) of Western sniper rifles and their employment of more powerful rounds, such as .300 Winchester Magnum and .338 Lapua Magnum, which are more suitable for targets beyond 600 metres (660 yd). These two influences have left a gap in the firepower of the rifle platoon that a more accurate optic-equipped service rifle derivative can usefully fulfill, especially in theaters such as Afghanistan where the shortcomings of standard 5.56mm service rifles at ranges over 300 meters became apparent.

== DM/sniper differences ==
The DM role differs significantly from that of a specially trained sniper. A sniper is a specialist highly trained in fieldcraft, who carries out a range of ISTAR-specific missions independent of others, and more specialized than standard infantry tasks. In contrast, a DM is a soldier who has received additional marksmanship training. Within a fireteam, the DM's role is to provide an additional capability to the infantry platoon, which is the ability to engage targets at greater ranges than the other members of the squad or section.

The DM operates as an integral member of the infantry platoon, providing a niche capability contributing to the overall firepower of the platoon in the same way as a grenadier with a rifle-mounted grenade launcher, allowing the team to engage more numerous targets and vehicles; or the automatic rifleman who employs the squad/section machine gun to lay down suppressing fire for area denial to the enemy. The DM weapon provides a capability to the infantry platoon in the shape of increased precision at a greater range than that provided by the standard infantry rifle, by virtue of its sighting system and/or larger caliber. By comparison, the sniper role is much more specialized, with very comprehensive selection, training and equipment.

Snipers are ordinarily equipped with specialized, purpose-built bolt-action or semi-automatic sniper rifles or anti-materiel rifles; while DMs are often equipped with accurized battle rifles or assault rifles fitted with optical sights and heavy barrels.

Snipers are mainly employed for targets at ranges from 600 metres (660 yd) up to more than 2,000 metres (2,190 yd). In the UK, US, and other Western countries over the last 15 years, sniper rifles chambered for standard military calibers, such as 7.62×51mm, have been replaced with those that employ larger, more specialized rounds, such as .300 Winchester Magnum or .338 Lapua Magnum, which give better accuracy at longer ranges than the standard military rifle calibers. An example of this is the British Army's replacement of the Accuracy International L96A1 in 7.62×51mm with the similar but larger and more powerful Accuracy International L115A3 rifle chambered in .338 Lapua Magnum.

DMs are utilized for targets at ranges between approximately 300–600 metres (330–660 yd) using a rifle chambered with standard-issue rifle ammunition, usually either 5.56×45mm or 7.62×51mm. While snipers often take a fixed strategic position and camouflage themselves (e.g. with a ghillie suit), a DM will tactically move with his unit and is otherwise equipped in the same way as other members of the infantry platoon.

== Equipment ==
=== Rifles ===
The designated marksman is intended to fill the gap between the typical infantry rifle and longer-range sniper rifles. The typical service rifle is intended for use at ranges up to a maximum of 300 meters, while sniper rifles are generally optimized for ranges of 600 meters and greater. Designated marksman rifles are designed to fill this gap, typically being employed at ranges of 300–600 metres (330–660 yd).

In some cases, the designated marksman rifle is simply an accurized version of the standard service rifle, such as the Mk 12 SPR (which is built on an M16 platform), while in other cases the rifle is a larger caliber rifle design, such as the British L129A1, Soviet SVD, or US rifles based on the M14, AR-10, or HK417.

Whether a modified existing service rifle or a specific design, the DM rifle will be chambered for a round already used in the infantry battalion, such as 5.56×45mm or 7.62×51mm, and it will retain semi-automatic firing capability with a magazine capacity of 10, 20, or 30 rounds, depending on the firearm in question.

=== Sidearm ===
Designated marksmen will carry whichever service pistol is specified in their unit's TOE for their billet or Military Occupational Specialty (MOS), if one is specified or available at all.

== Worldwide use ==
=== Australian Army ===
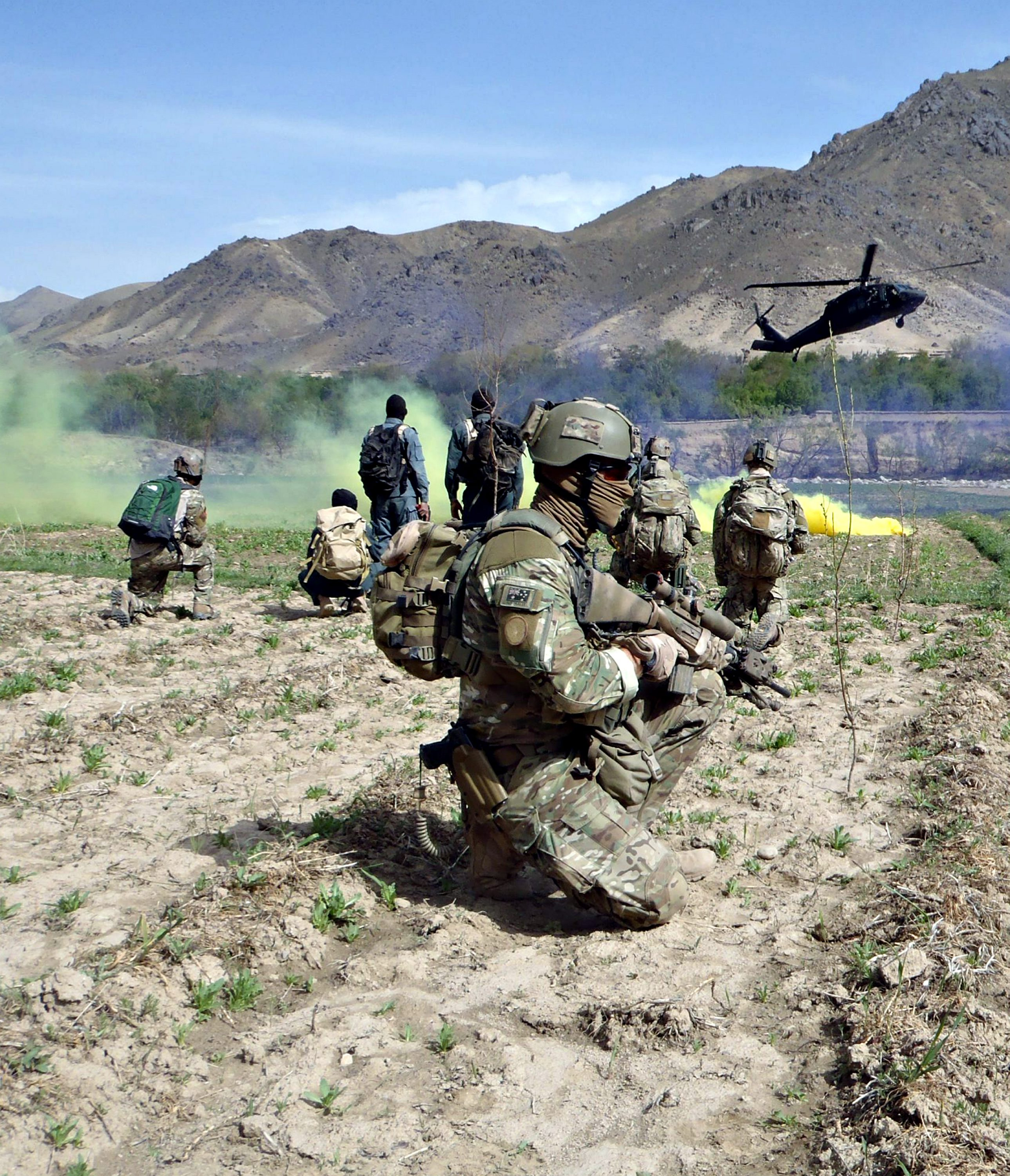
SR-25 in Australian service.

A typical Australian Army fireteam of four soldiers will include a scout employing an F88S Austeyr (5.56 NATO) fitted with an enhanced optic device, usually either an ACOG or ELCAN C79. Additionally, 7.62 mm marksman rifles (SR-25s) are employed by the maneuver support teams in the platoon. However, HK417 rifles have been procured by the Army as a substitute for the F88S during operations in Afghanistan and possibly thereafter. The SASR also uses the Mk 14 EBR amongst its four-man infantry sections.

=== British Army ===
Recently, the L86A2 Light Support Weapon was used in the designated marksman role due to its longer barrel compared to the standard L85A2 service rifle, which gives an increased range of up to 1000 m (1094 yd) while also capable of giving accurate automatic fire; the automatic fire role is now usually delivered by the Minimi. The Parachute Regiment, Royal Marines and United Kingdom Special Forces also use the HK417 rifle in the designated marksman role.

On 28 December 2009, the UK Ministry of Defence announced the adoption of the L129A1 Sharpshooter rifle made by Lewis Machine and Tool Company of the US for use as a semi-automatic DM rifle, firing the 7.62×51mm NATO round, providing accurate fire of up to 1000m as an urgent operational requirement (UOR) in Afghanistan.

=== Indian Army ===
The Indian Army uses a locally manufactured licensed variant of the SVD Dragunov in the Designated Marksman role. The Dragunov is used in conjunction with the INSAS family of weapons to give flexibility and striking power, in short to mid range firefights, to Indian Army infantry units engaged with opposing forces.

=== Israel Defense Forces (IDF) ===
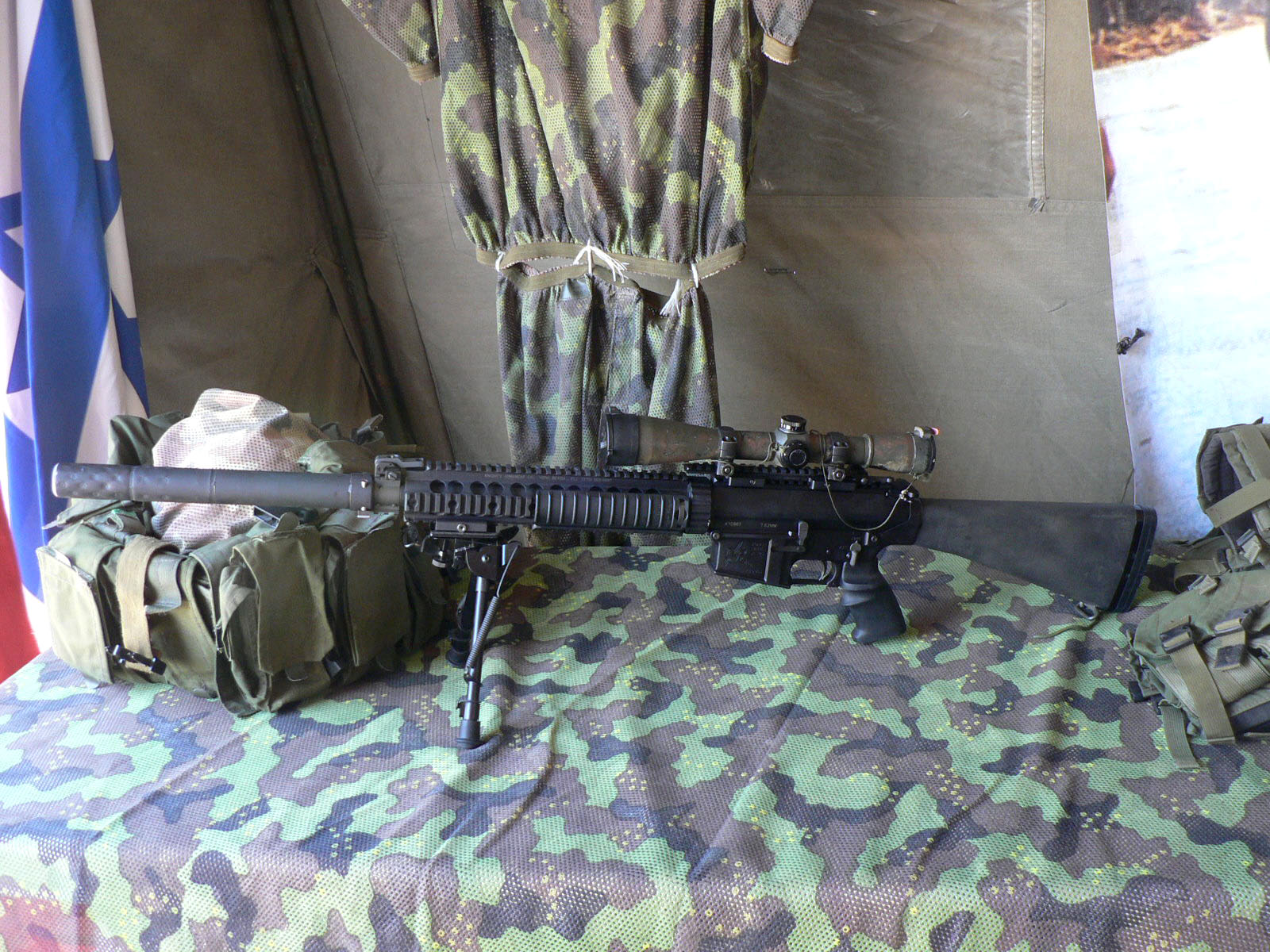
SR-25 rifle

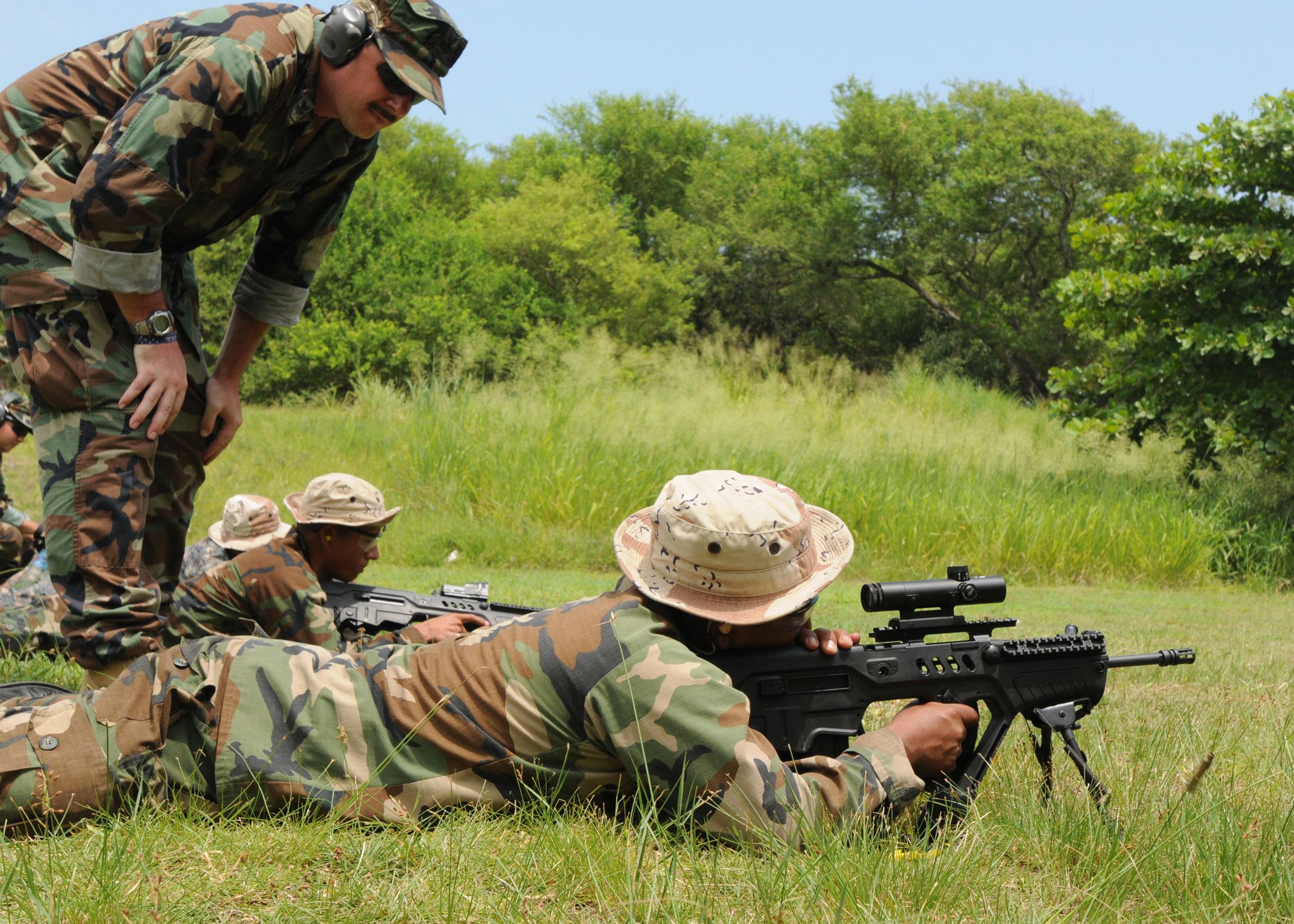
The IMI Tavor STAR-21 designated marksman variant (Guatemalan Navy special forces).

The Israel Defense Forces (IDF) implemented significant changes to sharpshooting doctrine in the 1990s. Doctrine, training program, and courseware were completely rewritten and snipers were issued the bolt-action M24 SWS instead of the M14 rifle. A major change was the introduction of a new battle profession – the designated marksman (קלע סער, "kala sa'ar" in Hebrew) – intended to improve the accuracy and firepower of an infantry platoon and compromise between the role of a sniper and an assault rifleman. These soldiers were generally called "squad snipers" to describe their role. They are armed with SR-25 rifle and sharpshooter variations of the IMI Tavor TAR-21 (STAR-21), M16A2E3 and M4 carbine.

=== United States Armed Forces ===
==== United States Marine Corps ====
The U.S. Marines use M14s that have been rebuilt at Marine Corps Base Quantico and designated as Designated Marksman Rifles, which are being replaced by the M39 Enhanced Marksman Rifle. The Corps also utilizes two different adaptations of the M16 assault rifle: the Squad Advanced Marksman Rifle (SAM-R), and the Mk 12 Mod 1 SPR. They also utilize the M27 Infantry Automatic Rifle.

==== United States Army ====
The United States Army 101st Airborne Division recognized the need for a Squad Designated Marksman when they encountered fires beyond the 300-600m range. In 2004, they began issuing M14s to specially trained soldiers for Designated Marksman work. The 82nd Airborne Division deployed with designated marksmen, trained on the M-4 using ACOGs with great success out to 600m, some 82nd Airborne units were issued M14s. The 3rd Infantry Division saw limited use of a modified M16, which was accurized in a manner similar to the U.S. Marines SAM-R, unofficially designated the AMU Squad Designated Marksman Rifle (SDM-R). This rifle was designed for engagements up to 1000m.

The U.S. Army DM also uses the predecessor of the M16 rifle, the M14, in certain infantry line units. These are commonly equipped with Leupold optics, a Sage stock and are designated the M14SE Crazy Horse.

==== United States Navy ====
The United States Navy SEAL Teams employs SDM rifles in roughly the same manner as the Marine Corps and Army, although there is no specific "Designated Marksman" role in a SEAL platoon. Known used weapons include, but are not limited to, the Mk 14 Mod 0 Enhanced Battle Rifle, M110 Semi-Automatic Sniper System, MK11/SR-25, the MK12 Mod X, the "SEAL Recon Rifle" and in some cases even regular M14 Rifles fitted with optical scopes.

The United States Navy Naval Expeditionary Combat Command employ Expeditionary Designated Marksman to support COCOM / DOD tasking as required. Known used weapons are the Mk 14 Mod 0 Enhanced Battle Rifle or M4 Rifle with fitted optical scopes. Previously, Designated Marksman assigned to NECC's Helicopter, Visit, Search, and Seizure teams were equipped with the M21 (SWS) w/ Leupold Mk4 LR/T after training with the USMC, US Army, and training organizations to deploy the rifle from various platforms (helicopter, ship, ground).

=== Soviet snipers ===
Although referred to as "snipers", the Soviet Union and its allies have since World War II employed specially-equipped and trained "sharpshooting" soldiers at a section ("squad") and platoon level to increase the range of their section to 1,000 meters (1,100 yd). This is commonly accepted as the first example of what came to be known as a designated marksman as opposed to a true sniper.

Since 1963, these soldiers have been equipped with the Dragunov SVD rifle that shares all the characteristics typical of a designated marksman rifle (semi-automatic fire, telescopic sight, chambered for standard military rifle cartridge).

== See also ==
- List of books, articles and documentaries about snipers
