= MSSR =

The abbreviation MSSR can refer to various concepts:

- The Moldavian Soviet Socialist Republic (1940-1991), a constituent republic of the Soviet Union.
- A Monopulse secondary surveillance radar, an advanced secondary surveillance radar.
- The Marine Scout Sniper Rifle, a sniper rifle developed by the Philippine Marine Corps.
