= SEAL Recon Rifle =

Designated marksman rifle

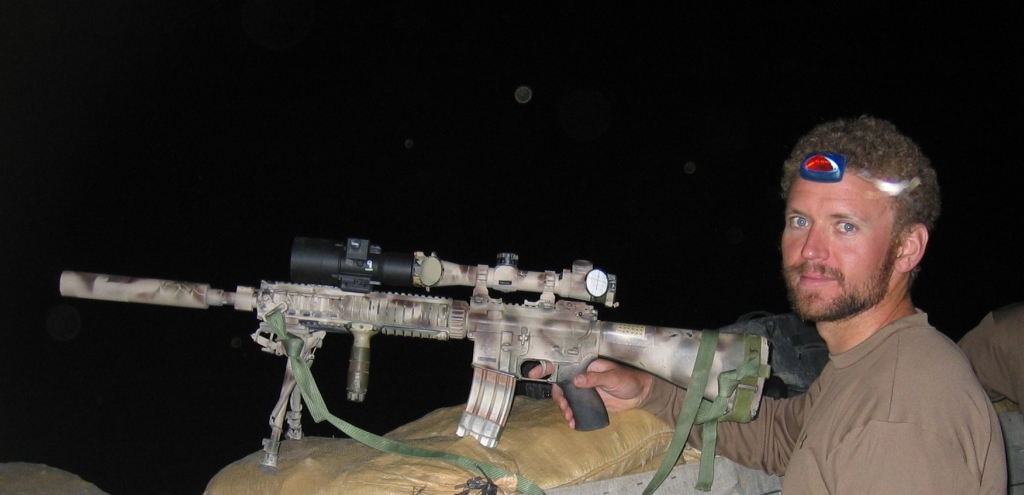
- A SEAL Recon Rifle featuring an AN/PVS-22 night-vision device held by Navy SEAL Matthew Axelson
- Type: Designated marksman rifle; Assault rifle
- Place of origin: United States

Service history
- In service: 1993–present
- Used by: United States Navy SEALs

Production history
- Designer: U.S. Navy SEAL armorers; Naval Surface Warfare Center Crane Division

Specifications
- Barrel length: 16 inch (406 mm)
- Cartridge: 5.56×45mm NATO; Mk 262 Mod 0
- Action: Gas-operated, rotating bolt
- Rate of fire: 700–950 rounds/min
- Feed system: 30-round detachable STANAG magazine
- Sights: Variable-power optic (^{i.e.}2.5–10); Back-up iron sights

The SEAL Recon Rifle (nicknamed the "Sniper M4" and "Recce") is an American designated marksman rifle and assault rifle used by the United States Navy SEALs. Essentially a heavily modified M16 rifle, it is intended to provide SEAL snipers and designated marksmen with a versatile, accurate, lightweight, and relatively compact weapon chambered in 5.56×45mm NATO.

== History ==
In the 1990's Delta Force sniper teams led to the development of various options for improving accuracy in the field, including improved ammunition and triggers, a range of optics, free-floating handguards, and rail systems.

Developed in-house by SEAL team armorers, the rifle was centered less around a rigid specification and more around the concept of an accurized rifle that could share the duties and ammunition of fielded M4 carbines, whilst also being able to engage targets beyond the carbines' range.

When further development was handed over to Naval Surface Warfare Center Crane Division, the United States Army incorporated their own concepts and funding into the joint program, resulting in the Mk 12 Special Purpose Rifle.

== Specifications ==
Initially, SEAL Recon Rifles were built in-house with the only requirements being a 16" barrel (406mm), and the ability to shoot any 5.56×45mm cartridge in inventory, including the first iterations of the 77-grain (5 gram) Mk262 Mod0 cartridge. Otherwise, the rifle was individualized to the tastes of the user by the armorer or the SEAL themselves.

The stainless-steel barrels were sourced from Lilja Precision Rifle Barrels with a 1:8 (203mm) twist and a unique heavy profile, beginning at 0.980 inches (25mm) in diameter for the first 2.60 inches (66mm) of length, then narrowing down to 0.850 inches (22mm) in diameter, 0.750 inches (19mm) in diameter underneath the front sight block, and 0.725 inches (18mm) in diameter to the muzzle.

These barrels were mated to flat-top upper receivers featuring an M1913 rail, to which optics and back-up iron sights could be attached. Operators commonly chose to install back-up iron sights manufactured by Knight's Armament Company, ARMS Inc, and Troy Industries with the rifles.

Recon rifles were reportedly fitted with free-float handguards, the most popular being the KAC M4 Match RAS and a longer-length LaRue free-float handguard, either of which provides plentiful rail space to mount accessories. KAC free-floated rails (NSN: 1005-01-562-0913) were part of the Mk12 Mod 1 package and were in common use during the war on terror.

Barrels were sometimes fitted with Ops Inc. 12th model suppressors and their accompanying muzzle brakes.

== See also ==
- Mk 12 Special Purpose Rifle
- Squad Designated Marksman Rifle
- Squad Advanced Marksman Rifle
