= Squad Designated Marksman Rifle =

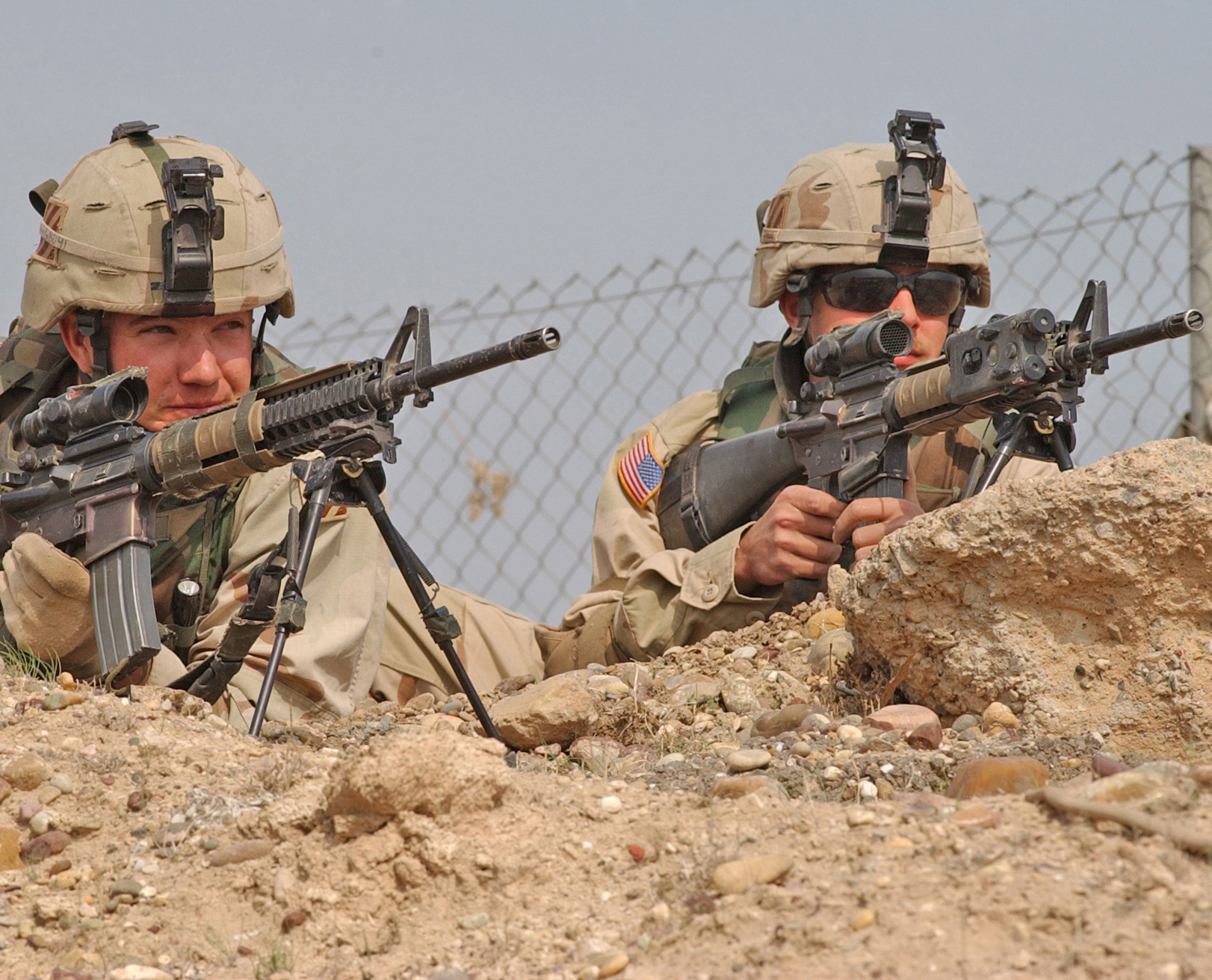
- Soldiers from the 3rd Infantry Division with SDM rifles.
- Type: Designated marksman rifle
- Place of origin: United States

Service history
- In service: 2004–2020
- Wars: War in Afghanistan (2001–2021); Iraq War

Production history
- Designer: United States Army Marksmanship Unit

Specifications
- Mass: 10 pounds (4.5 kg) with optic & fully loaded 30-round magazine
- Length: 39.5 inches (1,000 mm)
- Barrel length: 20 inches (510 mm)
- Cartridge: 5.56×45mm NATO
- Action: Gas-operated (direct impingement)
- Muzzle velocity: 3,050 ft/s (930 m/s)
- Effective firing range: 600 metres (660 yd)
- Feed system: 20- or 30-round detachable STANAG magazine

The Squad Designated Marksman Rifle (SDM-R) is an American designated marksman rifle used by the United States Army. It is essentially a heavily modified M16 rifle designed to provide U.S. Army designated marksmen greater accuracy and firepower at longer ranges, increasing an infantry squad's effective range to up to 600 meters.

The SDM-R is similar in development and role to the SEAL Recon Rifle and Mk 12 Special Purpose Rifle (SPR), designed and produced for the United States Navy SEALs and the United States Special Operations Command respectively.

The SDM-R was replaced by the M110A1 SDMR, expected to enter service in the 2020s. In this role, the M110A1 retains the "Squad Designated Marksman Rifle" name.

== History ==
The addition of an embedded marksman at the platoon or squad level has historically been a continuing process in the U.S. military. The United States Marine Corps (USMC) experimented with this during Project Metropolis, before creating the "Squad Advanced Marksman" (SAM) role along with the Squad Advanced Marksman Rifle (SAM-R) specifically for this purpose.

The 3rd Infantry Division followed suit in implementing a training program to have one marksman per squad, the Squad Designated Marksman (SDM), and developing a rifle, the Squad Designated Marksman Rifle (SDM-R). The SDM is an integral part of the squad and serves as a rifleman first and designated marksman second. The SDM is not meant to be a squad sniper who engages the enemy with precision fire at long ranges, but instead is trained to directly support the squad with well-aimed shots at ranges slightly beyond the normal engagement distances for riflemen.

Much like the U.S. Marine Corps SAM-R, the 3rd Infantry division SDM-R was an accurized M16 rifle built in-house by the United States Army Marksmanship Unit with 240 rifles provided for deployment in Iraq. The rifle was informally known as "the AMU rifle".

=== Replacement ===
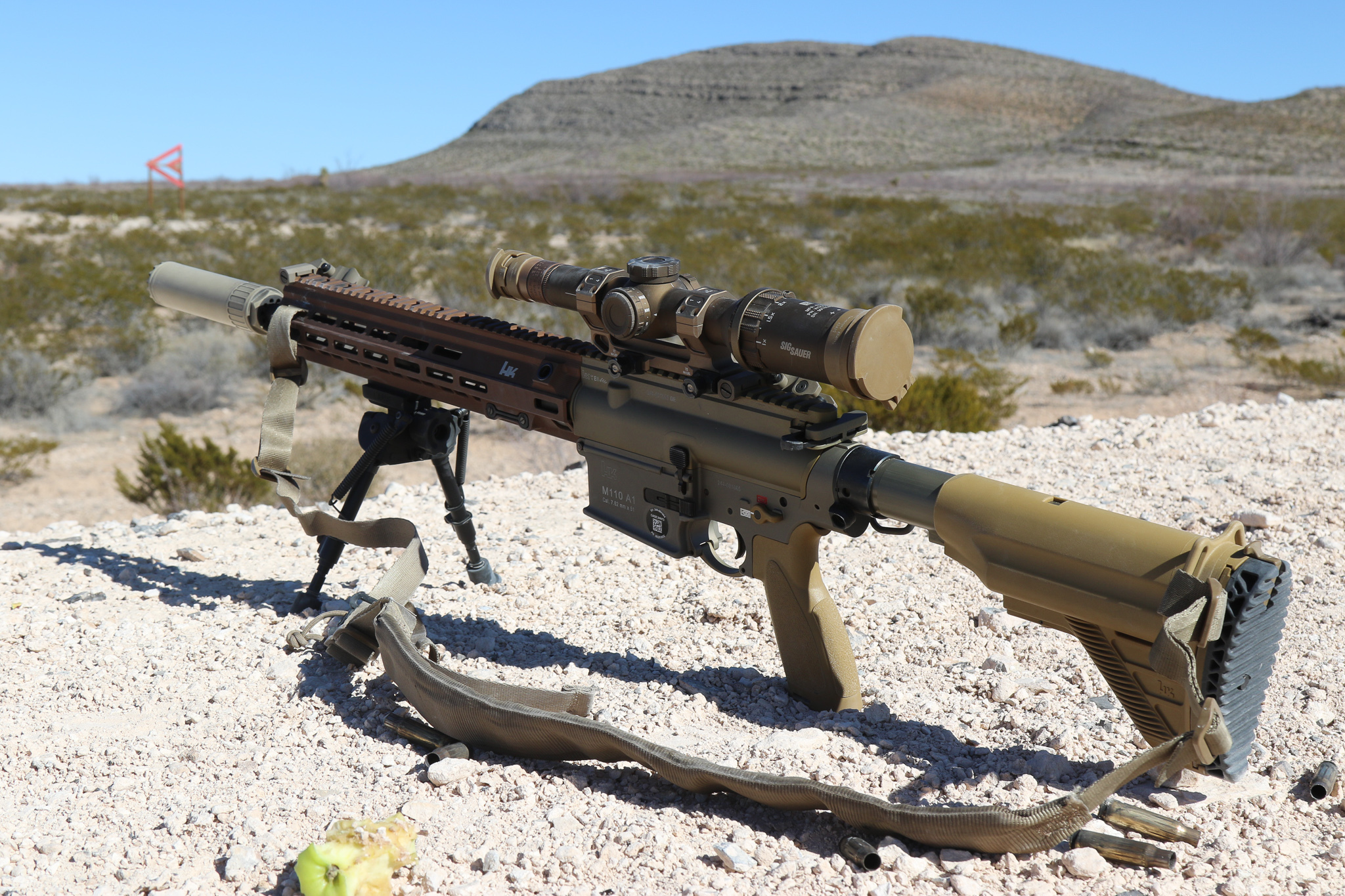
The M110A1 SDMR during testing in 2019

The SDM-R has since been replaced in U.S. Army service, mostly due to the performance of match grade 5.56 NATO ammo in the DMR role. Its slated replacement was the Heckler & Koch HK417-based M110A1 SDMR, expected to enter service in the early 2020s.

== Training ==
The National Guard Marksmanship Training Center of the Arkansas Army National Guard conducts the fourteen-day-long Squad Designated Marksman Course at Camp Joseph T. Robinson. Soldiers fire over 1500-rounds from the M16A4 rifle under the close supervision of course cadre. Another is done in Fort Benning, Georgia.

Task Force Small Arms Readiness Group (TF SARG) conducts the week-long SDM course at the SARG academy at Camp Bullis, Texas. Many of the instructors are President's 100 recipients.

== Design ==
- The U.S. Army used either M16A2 or A4 lower receivers previously supplied by either Colt or Fabrique Nationale de Herstal. All rifles were equipped with a fixed A2 stock and a Knight's Armament Company 2-stage match grade trigger The upper receivers were flat top style, but unlike the SAM-R and SPR, they did not have extended feed ramps.
- Barrel: The 1:7 twist, 20-inch (510 mm) barrel from the M16A2 and A4 were replaced with a stainless steel Douglas Barrels 1:8 twist, 20-inch barrel, with 12 flutes cut into the barrel to reduce weight. The front sight block was installed with 4 set screws instead of two taper pins. The SDM-R retained the A2-style flash hider.
- Sights and optics: The issued optic was a 4×32 Advanced Combat Optical Gunsight (ACOG) (models TA31F, TA31RCO, TA01, TA01B, or TA01NSN). A Matech Industries 600-meter backup iron sight was also used.
- Handguard: Daniel Defense DDM4 Rail 12.0 handguard, with an octagonal aluminum collar locking it to the upper receiver. The handguard provides a free-floating Picatinny rail forend.
- Bipod: A Harris S-L bipod attached to an ARMS #32 throw-lever rail mount was mounted to the underside of the handguard. Since the handguard was free-floating, it did not come into contact with the barrel, and any pressure from the bipod on the handguard did not deflect the barrel.

=== Variants ===
The 82nd Airborne Division examined an alternate version, based on the M4 carbine. The barrel was to have been an 18-inch (460 mm) long fluted Douglas barrel with 1:8 twist. A mid-length gas system was to be used, along with the Daniel Defense M4Rail 9.0 handguard. This effort never went beyond the staffing process.

== See also ==
- Squad Advanced Marksman Rifle
- SEAL Recon Rifle
- Mk 12 Special Purpose Rifle
