= Squad Advanced Marksman Rifle =

United States Marine Corps Squad Advanced Marksman Rifle
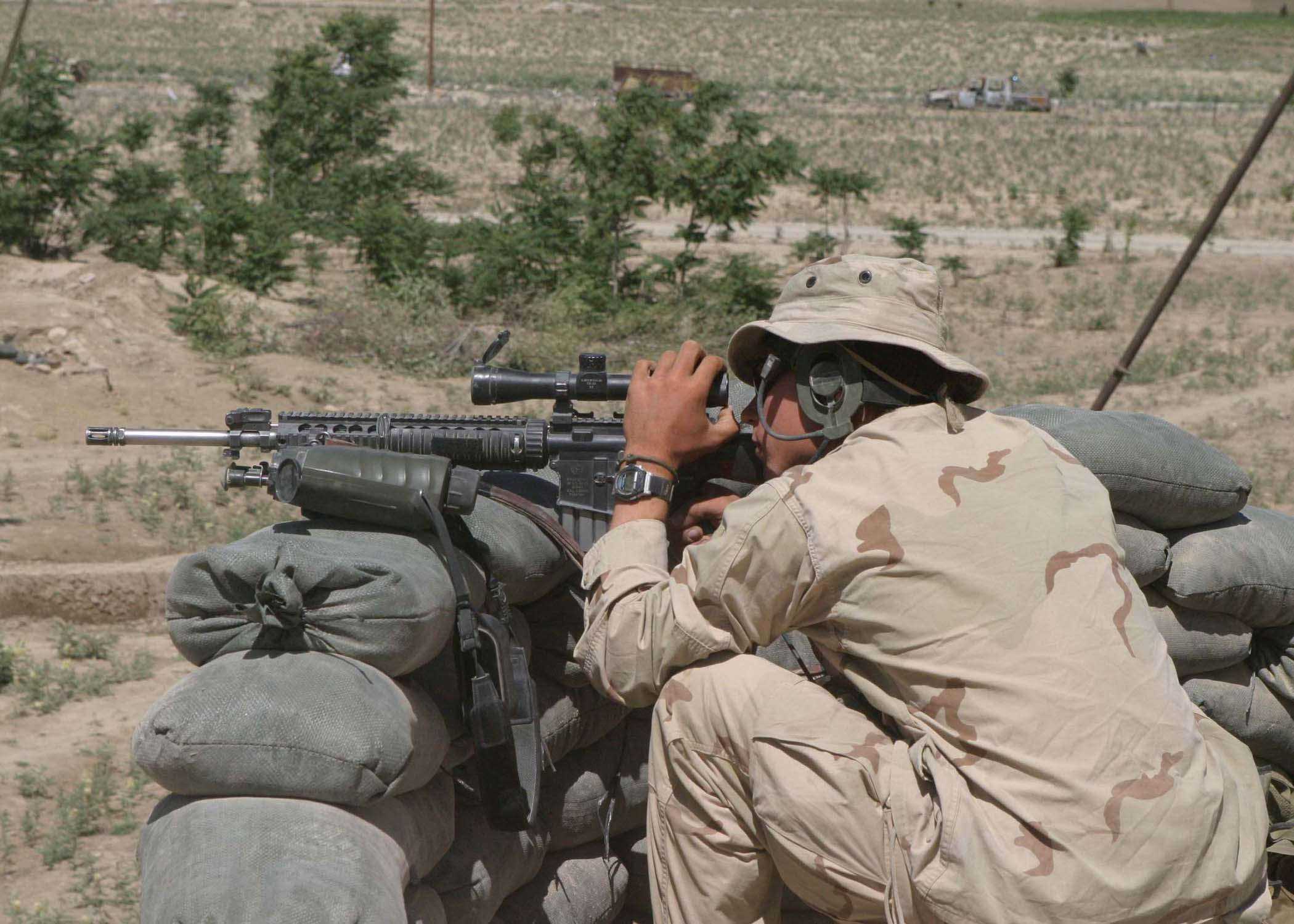
- A U.S. Marine Corps marksman of the 22nd MEU with the SAM-R in Afghanistan.
- Type: Designated marksman rifle
- Place of origin: United States

Service history
- In service: 2001–2015
- Wars: War in Afghanistan; Iraq War

Production history
- Designer: Precision Weapons Section, Weapons Training Battalion

Specifications
- Mass: 10 lb (4.5 kg) (fully loaded, with heavy barrel, optic, and 30-round STANAG magazine)
- Length: 39.5 in (1,000 mm)
- Cartridge: 5.56×45mm NATO
- Action: Gas-operated, Rotating bolt
- Rate of fire: Semi-automatic
- Muzzle velocity: 3,050 ft/s (930 m/s)
- Effective firing range: 600 yards (550 m)
- Feed system: 20- or 30-round STANAG Magazine

The Squad Advanced Marksman Rifle (SAM-R) is a semi-automatic designated marksman rifle developed and used by the United States Marine Corps. It gave users the capability to provide fire in support of a rifle squad, providing precision fire in support of an assault, and aid in observation and adjusting of supporting arms.

The SAM-R was retired by the U.S. military in the mid-2010s and thus is no longer in service, having been replaced by the M27 IAR.

== History ==
The Squad Advanced Marksman and his weapon, the Squad Advanced Marksman Rifle, was the product of extensive experimentation by the Marine Corps Warfighting Laboratory (MCWL) of the addition of a designated marksman to a Marine squad. The concept of a designated marksman was already in use by the 4th Marine Expeditionary Brigade (Anti-Terrorism) and Marine Corps Security Force Regiment. In exercises, a Marine with a scoped rifle and additional training provided immense benefit to small units. An optic provides information-gathering abilities as well as aiding aiming of support weapons such as machine guns and mortars.

The armorers at the MCWL decided to use the M16 rifle in order to maintain a certain level of commonality in both weapon and ammunition. There was some talk of adopting a weapon such along the same lines as the Mk 11 Mod 0, but instead that transferred over to a possible replacement for USMC personnel now using the Designated Marksman Rifle (DMR), a variant of the M14.

The SAM-Rs were assembled by the Precision Weapons Section of the Weapons Training Battalion at Marine Corps Base Quantico. For the war on terrorism, the approximately 100 assembled SAM-Rs were sent to the 22nd, 24th, and 26th Marine Expeditionary Units (MEU) of II Marine Expeditionary Force (MEF), which is located at Camp Lejeune, North Carolina. Squad Advanced Marksmen of I MEF, which is based at Camp Pendleton, California, made do with M16A4s with KAC M5 RAS forearms and TA31F ACOGs.

Some SAM-Rs are nicknamed "West Coast SAM-Rs", though they are simply M16A4s with optics and bipods and not an 'accurized' rifle like the SAM-R used by the Marines of II MEF.

They were in use by the USMC. The British Army reportedly used a small number.

=== Replacement ===
After a lengthy period of debate over the role of accuracy vs. suppressive fire in the Marines, they adopted a new doctrine and weapon in the more accurate M27 Infantry Automatic Rifle for their service rifle in September 2018 and it will replace most of the M4 Carbine for the infantry.

Certain M27s are selected for accuracy; when provided with scopes and suppressors they are designated as the M38 Designated Marksman Rifle. The rifles are distributed one per squad.

== Design ==
The original test weapon was a modified M16A2 rifle with a free-floated 1:7 stainless steel match grade heavy barrel, a "Mil-Std-1913 modular rail system" (this most likely implies the use of the Knight's Armament Company Free-Floating Rail Adapter System) and an M16A1 trigger assembly (semi and full-auto functioning).

A number of day optics were used initially, which included Hensoldt Blitz, Leupold CQ/T, ACOG, Leupold TS-30A1 and ultimately the Leupold TS-30A2. The test night optic was the AN/PVS-17B, apparently now being fielded with USMC combat units though the AN/PVS-22 is preferred.

SAM-Rs use 5.56 NATO-based MK262 ammo.

The later SAM-R was roughly a modified M16A4 pattern rifle:

- Upper & Lower Receivers: The lower and upper receivers are standard M16A4. The SAM-R has a standard M16A1 single-stage trigger installed, which allows limited use as an automatic rifle, ammunition permitting (See Mk 262 Mod 1), but there also have been examples using Knight's Armament (henceforth referred to as KAC) two-stage match triggers. The SAM-R is also equipped with a PRI M84 Gas Buster charging handle system and a Norgon ambidextrous magazine release.
- Barrel: The barrel is a 20 in (510 mm) long 1:7 in (180 mm) twist match grade stainless steel barrel, manufactured by Compass Lake Engineering from Krieger blanks. Current SAM-Rs are equipped with 'chipped' flash suppressors to allow attachment of the KAC M4 quick-detach sound suppressor, while earlier examples were fielded with standard compensators.
- Sights & Optics: For iron sights, the SAM-R uses the KAC 600-Meter flip-up rear sight. The first SAM-Rs used a custom Quantico-built gas block with bayonet lug and Picatinny rail on top. A KAC flip-up sight was mounted on that rail. Some intermediate models used separate gas blocks and barrel attached bayonet lugs. Current rifles are built with a special KAC-made gas block that has both a flip-up sight and a bayonet lug. The issued day optic is the TS-30A2 (military designation for Leupold's Mark 4 M3 2.5-8 x 36mm MR/T Illuminated riflescope) mounted with ARMS #22 high rings, the same configuration used with the Mk 12 Mod 0/1 SPR, though more recent photos indicate the four-power Marine Corps Rifle Combat Optic ACOG is also used at times. The folding front sight mentioned earlier was designed for use with the AN/PVS-22 Universal Night Sight.
- Handguard: The SAM-R uses the KAC Free-Floating Rail Adapter System, which provides a modular mounting location for all types of equipment. SAM-Rs are usually seen with Harris swivel bipods attached to this rail via a KAC bipod stud.

== See also ==
- Squad Designated Marksman Rifle
