= Mk 12 Special Purpose Rifle =

American designated marksman rifle

United States Navy Mk 12 SPR (Special Purpose Rifle)
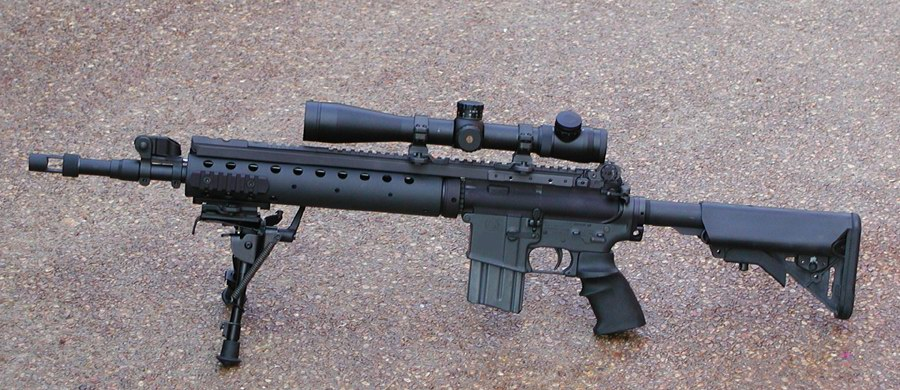
- An SPR
- Type: Designated marksman rifle
- Place of origin: United States

Service history
- In service: 2002–2017
- Wars: Operation Enduring Freedom; Operation Iraqi Freedom

Production history
- Designer: Naval Surface Warfare Center Crane Division
- Variants: SPR, SPR/A, SPR/B; Mk 12 MOD 0; Mk 12 MOD 1; Mk 12 MOD H

Specifications
- Mass: 10 lb (4.5 kg) (fully loaded, heavy barrel and optic mounted)
- Length: 37.5 inches (952.5 mm)
- Barrel length: MOD 0/1 variant: 18 in (457.2 mm); MOD H variant: 16 in (406.4 mm)
- Cartridge: 5.56×45mm Mk 262
- Action: Gas-operated, direct impingement, rotating bolt
- Muzzle velocity: 2,750 ± 20 ft/s (838.2 ± 6.1 m/s) using Mk 262 Mod 1 ammunition
- Effective firing range: 700 m (770 yd)
- Feed system: 20- or 30-round STANAG magazine

The United States Navy Mk 12 MOD 0/1/H Special Purpose Rifle (SPR) is a designated marksman rifle that was in service with United States special operations forces in the designated marksman role until 2017, also designed to be shorter than standard weapons. SPR initially stood for Special Purpose Receiver as it referred to an add-on upper receiver assembly (part of the proposed SOPMOD upgrades), but that nomenclature changed to Special Purpose Rifle as the weapon became a stand-alone weapons system.

The SPR was eventually type-classified by the U.S. Navy as the Mk 12. The weapon was developed by the Naval Surface Warfare Center Crane Division for US military special operations units.

The rifle is designed to fire semi-automatically, although it has the option to fire in full auto in case of emergencies.

== History ==
Early experience in influencing the SPR was from American forces deployed in Somalia when they used different optics, ammunition, triggers, free float handguards and rail systems for their rifles. The Mk 12 was developed to bridge the gap between standard infantry rifles such as the M4 carbine and larger sniper systems like the SR-25, offering improved accuracy and effective range while maintaining relatively low weight and maneuverability. The system was designed to provide increased precision at extended ranges compared to standard service rifles while remaining lighter and more maneuverable than traditional sniper platforms. The SPR concept was originally proposed by Mark Westrom, president of ArmaLite, while working at Rock Island Arsenal in 2000. Its design group included John Noveske and Steve Holland. The program was an outgrowth of the desire by both US Army and Navy special operations forces for a rifle with greater effective range than an M4 carbine but shorter than an SR-25. The SPR program appears to have grown out of both the SOPMOD Block I program, and the U.S. Navy SEALs Recon Rifle, a 16" flat-topped M16 carbine. Early models included the SPR, SPR/A, and SPR/B. The Naval Surface Warfare Center, Crane Division expanded on the Recon Rifle.

Initial tests were conducted in October 2000 in order to determine any weaknesses with the first SPR rifles manufactured. From 2000 to 2001, all errors were corrected for the second production of SPRs. The first SPRs were issued in 2002.

The Mk 12 Mod 0 was only used by the US Army Special Forces while the Mk 12 Mod 1 was used by the Rangers, US Navy SEALs and Special Tactical Teams. The United States Marine Corps (USMC) also used the Mk 12 Mod 1 towards the end of the war in Iraq and extensively during the war in Afghanistan. They were mostly deployed as designated marksman rifles (DMR). The Mk 12 Mod H was used primarily by Army SOF and Special Mission Units (SMU), and featured a retrofit upper of the Mod 0 with PRI Gen3 round handguards and a shorter RECCE rail to replace the original Swan Sleeve, reducing weight, and either Douglas or Noveske barrels made with the SPR profile in a rifle length gas system.

The Mk 12 was phased out of service in 2017.

== Design ==
=== Upper receiver ===
The majority of the SPR upper receivers were initially supplied by Colt, with others being produced by Diemaco (now Colt Canada). Colt had been outsourcing parts of its production to Diemaco for several years, then purchased Diemaco in February 2005. It is unclear whether the upper receivers for the later SPRs came solely from ArmaLite, or were a mix of receivers from ArmaLite and Colt/Diemaco.

All of these upper receivers are flat-topped, but have been seen with either the old-style teardrop forward assist or the newer round style. The rifle's configuration emphasized modularity, allowing operators to adapt optics, suppressors, and accessories depending on mission requirements while maintaining consistent performance.

=== Lower receiver ===
When the SPR program was still just an upper receiver assembly (and not a complete rifle), Crane assembled all of its prototypes using either M16A1 or M4A1 lower receivers, because the full auto trigger group in these lower receivers provided a consistent pull while the more common 3-round burst trigger groups didn't.

While a number of trigger options were tried in the end, the Knight's Armament Company (KAC) 2-stage trigger was finally decided upon as the standard. Most of the obsolete M16A1 lower receivers were turned into NSWC Crane for disposal.

=== Barrel ===
An 18-inch (460 mm) (MOD 0/1) or 16-inch (410 mm) (MOD H) threaded-muzzle match-grade free floating stainless steel heavy barrel with a 1:7 (178 mm) rifling twist ratio is standard for the SPR.

The barrels are manufactured by Douglas Barrels with a unique contour that reduced weight but maintained rigidity for accuracy. An OPS Inc. muzzle brake and collar (to align the OPS Inc. 12th Model Suppressor) is installed with the barrel.

These barrels were designed to take advantage of the new Mk 262 cartridge, which uses a 77-grain (5 g) bullet.

Some early Mod Hs were made using Noveske barrels but eventually switched back to the Douglas barrels commonly shared across the other variants.

=== Stock ===
SPRs have been seen with M16A1 or M16A2 fixed buttstocks, telescoping M4 buttstocks, and the Crane Enhanced telescoping buttstock. The rifles are compatible with any type of stock system developed for the M16.

=== Handguards ===
In all cases a free-floating forearm is used, which does not touch the barrel directly. This increases the accuracy of the weapon by removing vibration and pressure exerted on the barrel by the rest of the gun. The first SPRs used PRI Gen I or Gen II carbon-fiber free-float tubes. The SPR/A, SPR/B, and MK 12 MOD 1 all use the Knights Armament Company M4 Match Free-Floating Rail Adapter System, KAC part number 99167.

The Mk 12 MOD 0/H uses PRI Gen III free-float tubes. The Gen I and Gen II Freefloat Forearms are combined with the Atlantic Research Marketing Systems #38 SPR MOD Sleeve, while the Gen III Freefloat Forearm, due to its larger barrel nut, only works with the ARMS #38 SPR PEQ-2-3.

=== Accessories ===
The original SPR used an early PRI flip-up front sight with an elevation dial. The Mk 12 MOD 0/H uses the current PRI flip-up front sight. The SPR/A, SPR/B, and Mk 12 MOD 1 use the KAC rail forend flip-up front sight, KAC part number 99051. The SPR and Mk 12 MOD 0/H use the ARMS #40 flip up rear sight. The rest of the models use the KAC 600 meter flip up rear, KAC part number 98474.

Due to the relative modularity of the system, optics (as well as almost everything else) can be mounted according to the operator's wishes. However, SPRs are most often seen with a 3.5–10×40 mm Leupold LR M3 (SPR/A), a 2.5–8×36 mm TS-30 (SPR/B), or a 3–9×36 mm TS-30 A2 (Mk 12 MOD 0/1) Mid Range/Tactical Illuminated Reticle Dayscope. Night vision devices can also be attached. These scopes usually come with flip open dust covers and a honeycomb anti-glare anti-reflection device. Given Nightforce Optics' NAVSPECWAR contract, it is believed that many NAVSPECWAR issued SPRs will use the Nightforce 2.5-10x42 NXS scope.

A long accessory rail, called a Swan Sleeve (ARMS SPR MOD or ARMS #38 SPR PEQ-2-3), manufactured by ARMS, is installed, running the length of the rifle. The SPR/A and SPR/B both used the KAC M4 Match FF RAS, KAC part number 99167. Two ARMS #22 Throwlever 30 mm steel rings are used to mount the dayscope. The SPR/A, SPR/B, and Mk 12 MOD 1 use ARMS #22 high rings, while due to the increased height from the SWAN Sleeve, the SPR and Mk 12 MOD 0/H use ARMS #22 medium rings. An under-the-handguard ARMS #32 Throwlever mount is used to mount the Harris bipod (the ARMS #42 Throwlever mount is used to mount the Versa-Pod); this features a quick release action. Nightforce Ultralite 1.375" rings were also alternate issued rings, primarily with Nightforce riflescopes from Crane.

Originally the relatively expensive Parker-Hale swivel bipods were used, but were taken off the system after the initial SPR. Currently, a Harris swivel model bipod is typically used with the SPR, and is sometimes seen with a KMW Pod-Loc tension adjustment device. As mentioned above, the bipod is mounted via an ARMS #32 throwlever device attached to the bottom rail of the rifle's forearm. The ARMS mount is used on both the MOD 0 and MOD 1.

The OPS Inc. 12th Model SPR Muzzle Brake Suppressor threads directly onto the OPS Inc. muzzle brake and uses the collar to stay centered for Mk 12 MOD 0/1 models. The first 100 suppressors were made in RD Systems in South Beloit, Illinois.

In 2014, Ops, Inc stopped manufacturing this model of suppressors. The equivalent product is currently manufactured by Allen Engineering Co as the AEM5. The AEM5 is essentially the same suppressor design and actually built by the same individual, Ron Allen, who previously fabricated the 12th model suppressor for Ops, Inc. Other models of this suppressor are also produced that look the same from the outside, but are fundamentally different suppressors.

=== Ammunition ===
The SPR is not used to fire standard issue 5.56mm M855A1, M193 ball, or M856 tracer ammunition. Due to the limits in terminal performance and relatively poor accuracy of the 62-grain (4 g) M855 ball, the Mk 262 Open Tip Match (OTM) round was developed and manufactured by Black Hills Ammunition as a more accurate round for the SPR. The first production batches were designated Mk 262 MOD 0 and used a Sierra MatchKing 77-grain (5 g) Hollow Point Boat Tail bullet without a cannelure (crimping groove).

Black Hills then approached the Nosler bullet manufacturing company, who made a similar 77 gr (5.0 g) OTM bullet, and Nosler agreed to supply cannelured bullets to Black Hills.

The newer load was designated Mk 262 MOD 1. Recently, Sierra added a minimal cannelure to its bullet, and this has since replaced the Nosler bullet in the current versions of Mk 262 MOD 1. In late 2014, Sierra introduced a tipped version of this bullet which adds a polymer tip to improve ballistics.

This new bullet was found exclusively in an upgraded version of the Black Hills Ammo MK262 MOD 1 loading, but this bullet has been released by Sierra to reloaders prior to the end of 2014. The Sierra part number for this bullet is 7177.

== Clones ==
The Mk 12 SPR has been manufactured by various firearms companies as clone rifles after the Mk 12 was phased out.

Centurion Arms manufactures clones of the Mk 12. Troy Industries made a retro Mk 12 for sale in 2017. Oberland Arms released a version of the Mk 12 in 2019.

Palmetto State Armory released clones of the Mk 12 Mod 0, Mod 1, and Mod H in 2023 known as the Sabre Mk 12. Precision Reflex Inc unveiled a Mk 12 rifle chambered in .308 Winchester in SHOT SHOW 24 in January 2024.

== Gallery ==
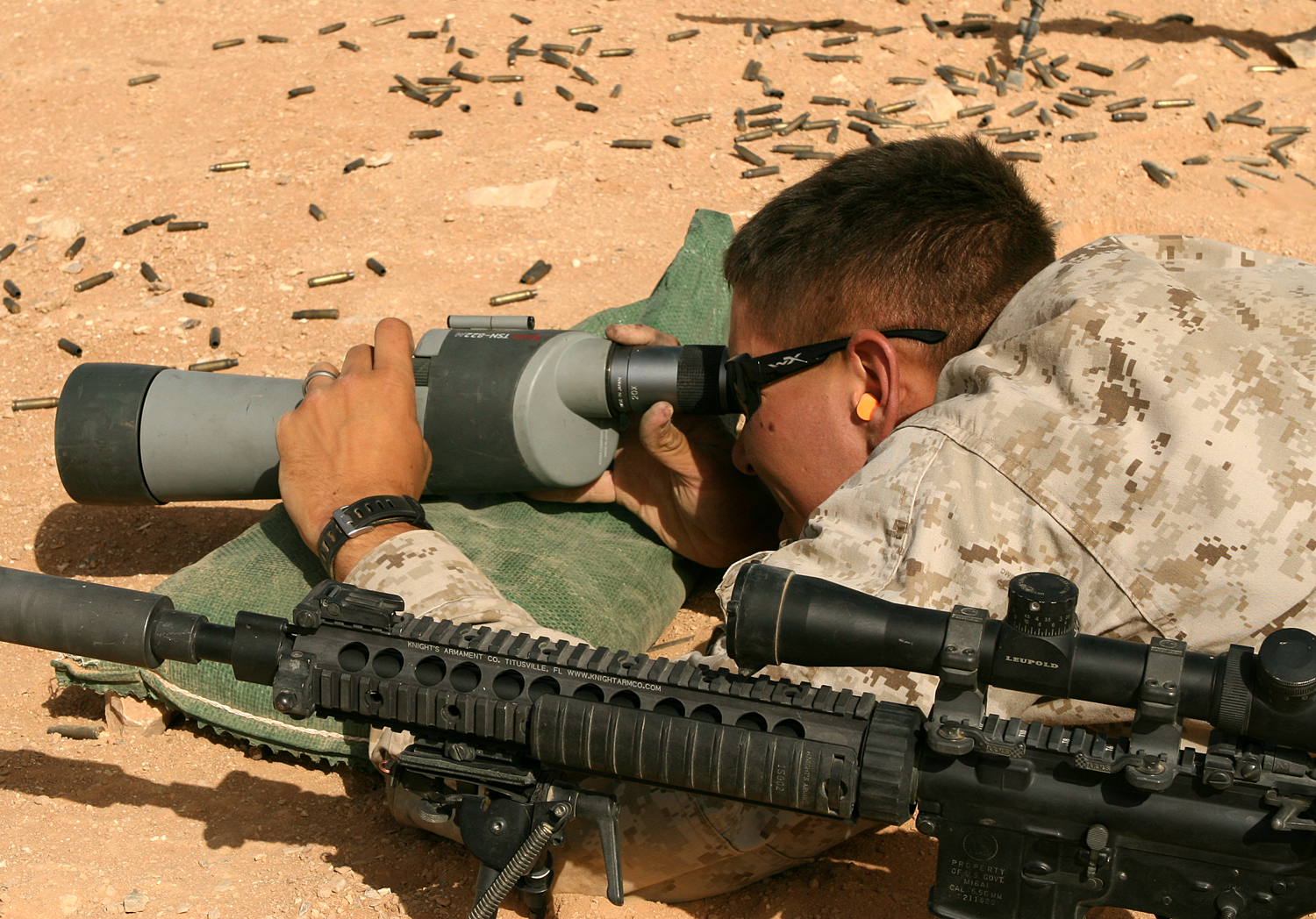
Mk 12 Mod 1 with visible markings

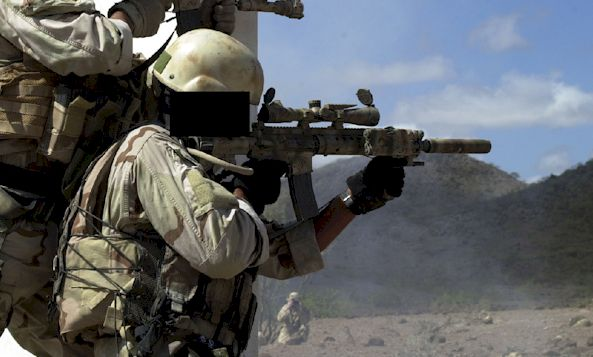
US Army SF takes aim with his desert camouflage-painted SPR. An Insight Technologies AN/PEQ-2A Target Pointer/Illuminator Aiming Light (TIPAL) is mounted on the right of the rifle's handguards. A standard M4 telescoping stock is mounted.

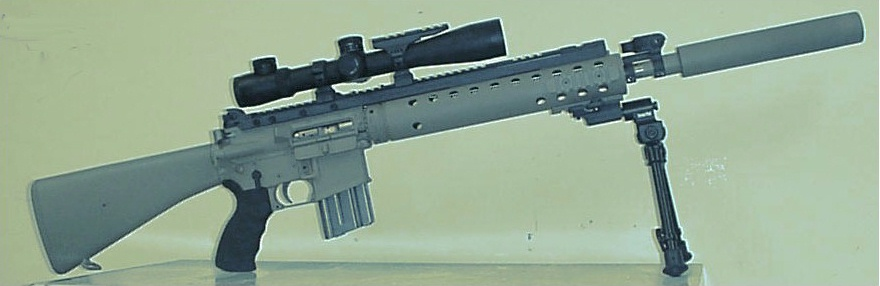
An SPR, not a Mk 12 Mod 0. Note the early PRI freefloat tube of constant diameter. This SPR has a Versa-pod bipod and has a fixed stock. The upper receiver has a teardrop-shaped forward assist.

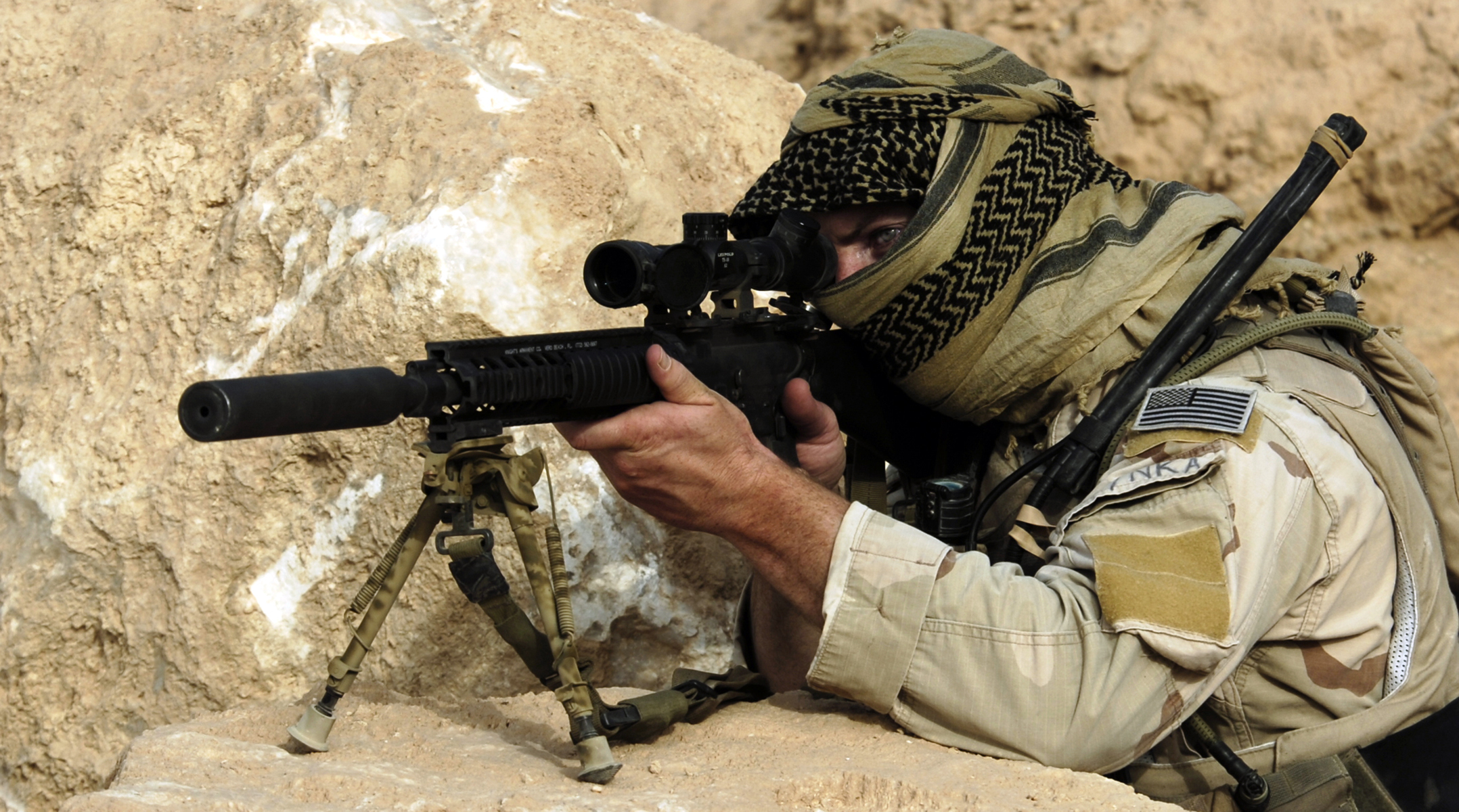
A U.S sniper looks through the scope of a Mk 12 Mod 1 Special Purpose Rifle.

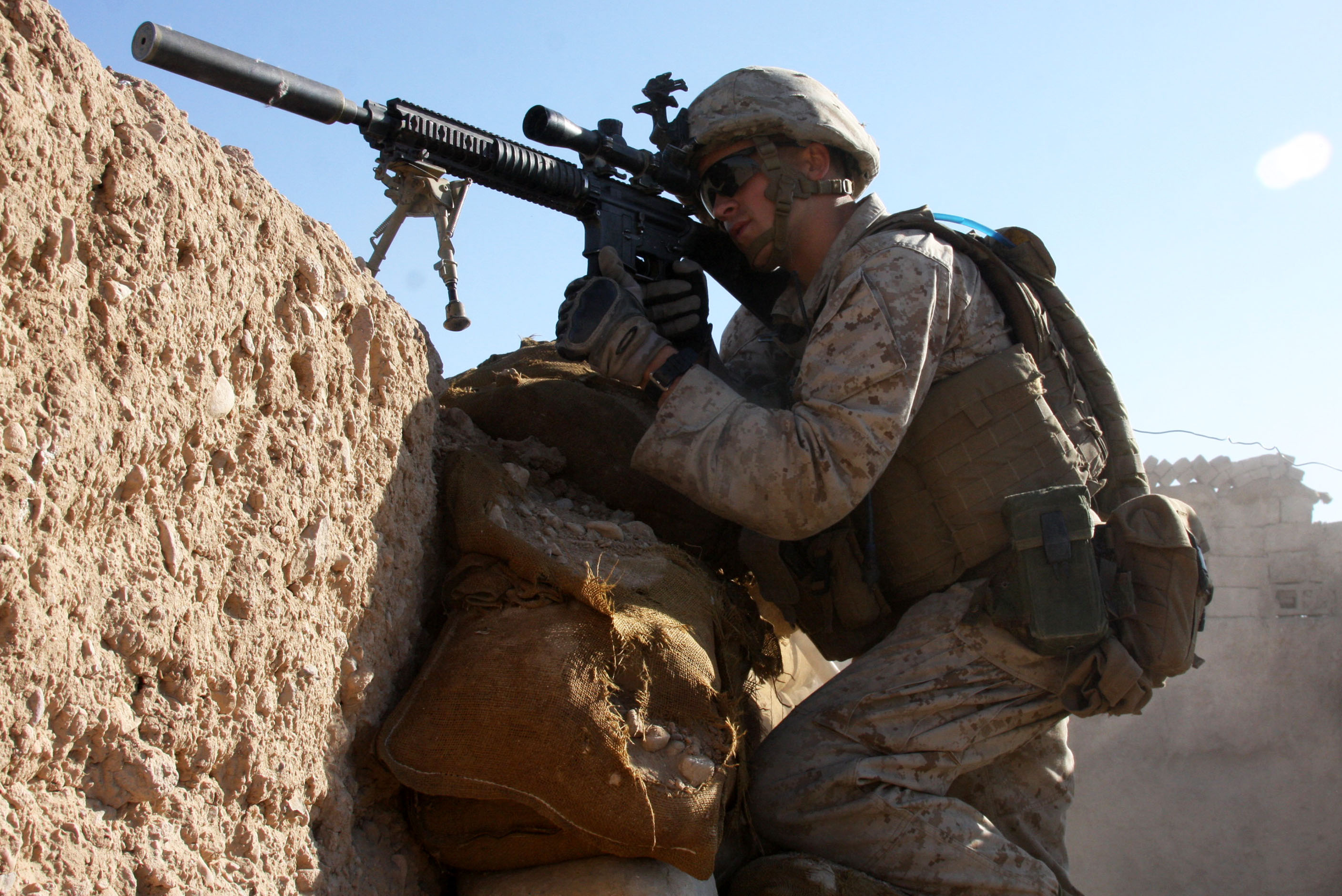
Mk 12 Mod 1 rifle in USMC service in Afghanistan, 2010.

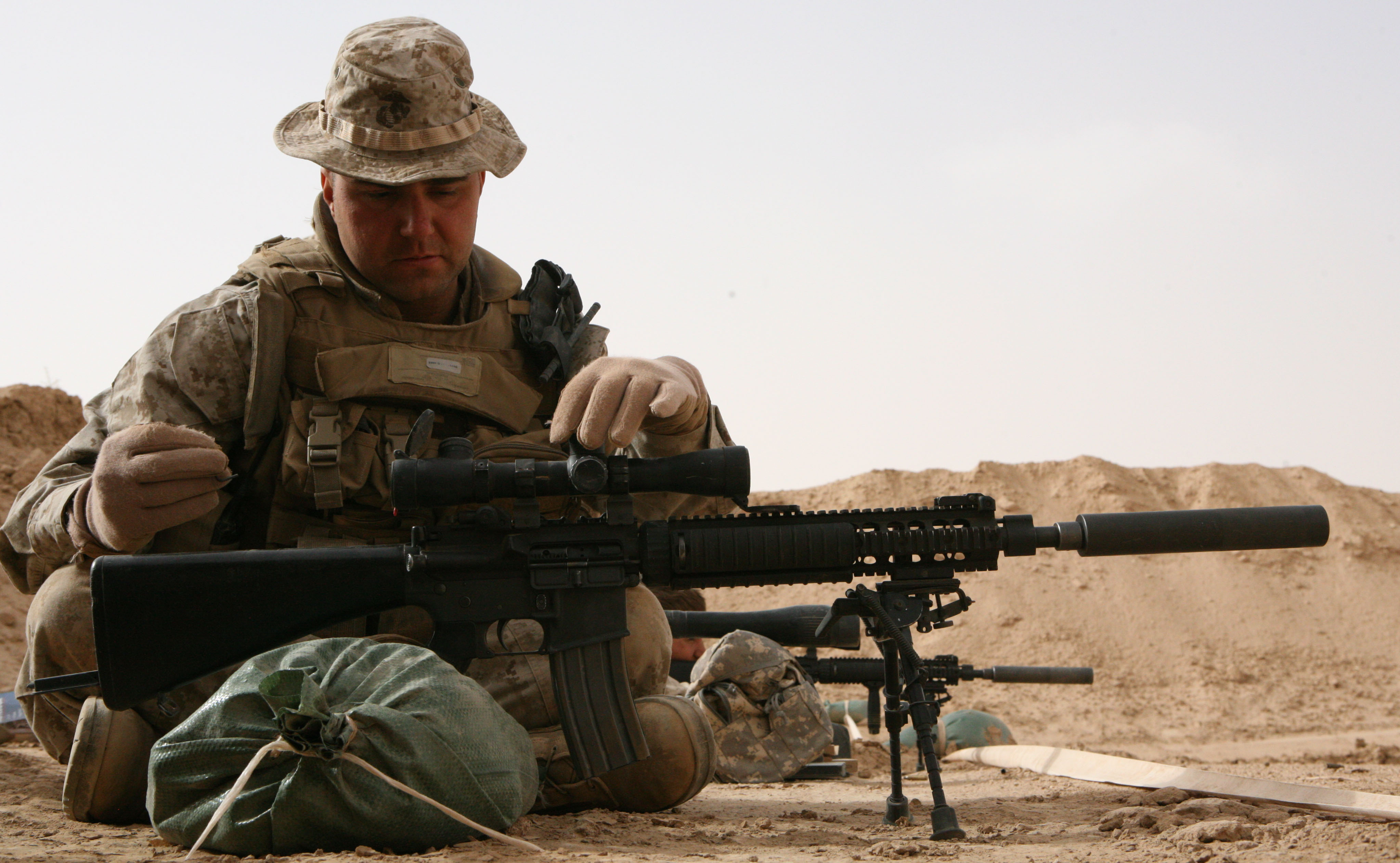
A USMC Mk 12 Mod 1 on a range in Iraq.

== See also ==
- SEAL Recon Rifle – Designated marksman rifle
- Squad Advanced Marksman Rifle
- Squad Designated Marksman Rifle
