= United States Marine Corps Designated Marksman Rifle =

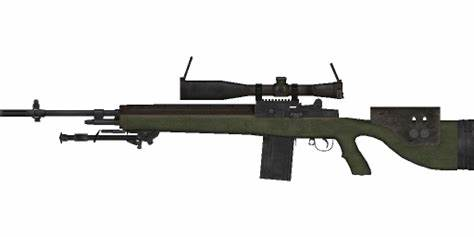
- Rendering of a 7.62×51mm NATO Designated Marksman Rifle
- Type: Designated marksman rifle
- Place of origin: United States

Service history
- In service: 2001–2014
- Wars: War in Afghanistan (2001–2021); War in Iraq

Specifications
- Mass: 4.5–5.0 kg (9.9–11.0 lb)
- Length: 1,118 mm (44.0 in)
- Barrel length: 559 mm (22.0 in)
- Cartridge: 7.62×51mm NATO
- Action: Gas-operated, rotating bolt
- Rate of fire: Semi-automatic
- Muzzle velocity: 2,580 ft/s (790 m/s) with M118LR; 175 grain ammunition 2,750 ft/s (840 m/s) with M80; 147 grain ammunition
- Effective firing range: 600–800 m (660–870 yd)
- Feed system: 10 or 20-round detachable box magazine

The United States Marine Corps Designated Marksman Rifle (DMR, NSN 1005-01-458-6235; more formally the United States Rifle, Caliber 7.62 mm, M14, DMR) is a semi-automatic, gas-operated rifle chambered for the 7.62×51mm NATO cartridge. It is a modified version of the M14 rifle formerly used by the United States Marine Corps. The USMC Precision Weapons Section at Marine Corps Base Quantico built all DMRs.

The Marine Corps replaced the DMR with the M39 Enhanced Marksman Rifle on a one-for-one basis.

== History ==
In 1989, the USMC began a program to upgrade M14s not decommissioned into DMRs by designing them with fiberglass stocks and new barrels. This was done by the Precision Weapons Section.

== Design ==
The DMR was issued with match-grade M118LR 175-grain Long Range ammunition. It can have various scopes attached on the upper receiver, including the AN/PVS-4 Starlight scope, via picatinny rail.

The DMR can fire precisely up to 1,000 yards if M118LR special ball ammo is used.

The "basic" DMR (i.e., without secondary sight, magazine, sling, basic issue items, cleaning gear, suppressor and bipod) weighs 11 pounds (5.0 kg) or less.

The DMR design facilitates repairing or replacing of the sight mount, barrel, bolt, and other key assemblies at the third echelon maintenance level.

=== Specifications ===
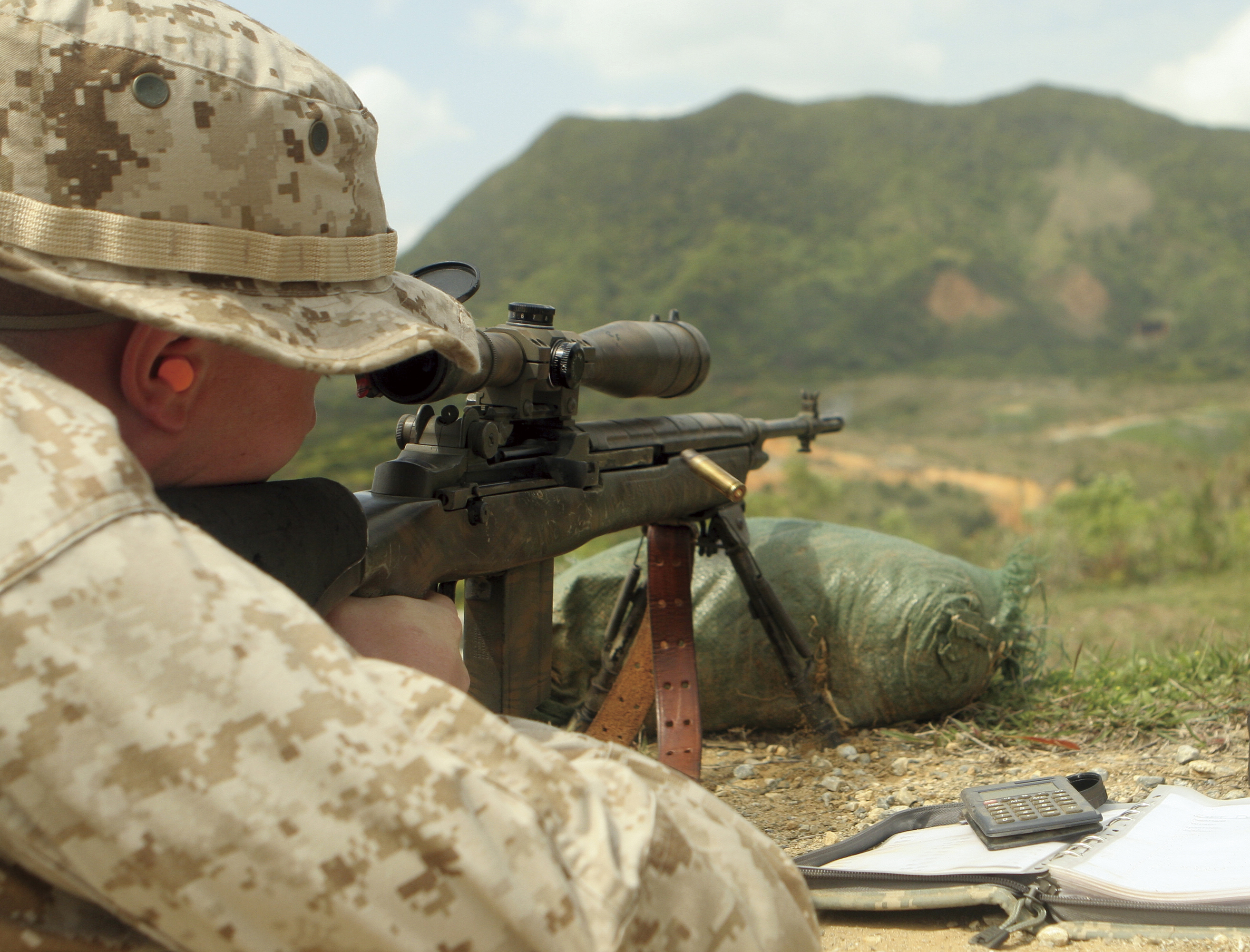
M14 DMR firing

There are several notable differences between the basic M14 and the DMR.

- Barrel: A 22 inches (560 mm) stainless steel, match-grade barrel by Krieger Barrels, Inc.
- Stock: McMillan Tactical M2A fiberglass stock. This particular stock features a pistol grip and a buttstock with adjustable saddle cheekpiece.
- Optics: An over-action MIL-STD-1913 Picatinny rail allows for the use of any optic compatible with the rail; this includes a rather large variety of military scopes and imaging devices.
- Muzzle device: Most DMRs utilize the traditional M14 muzzle device, although since deployment in 2001, some DMRs are now equipped with the OPS, Inc. 2-port muzzle brake, which is threaded and collared to accept an OPS-Inc. 12th Model sound suppressor.
- Bipod: A Harris S-L bipod is used on the USMC DMR.

== Combat use ==
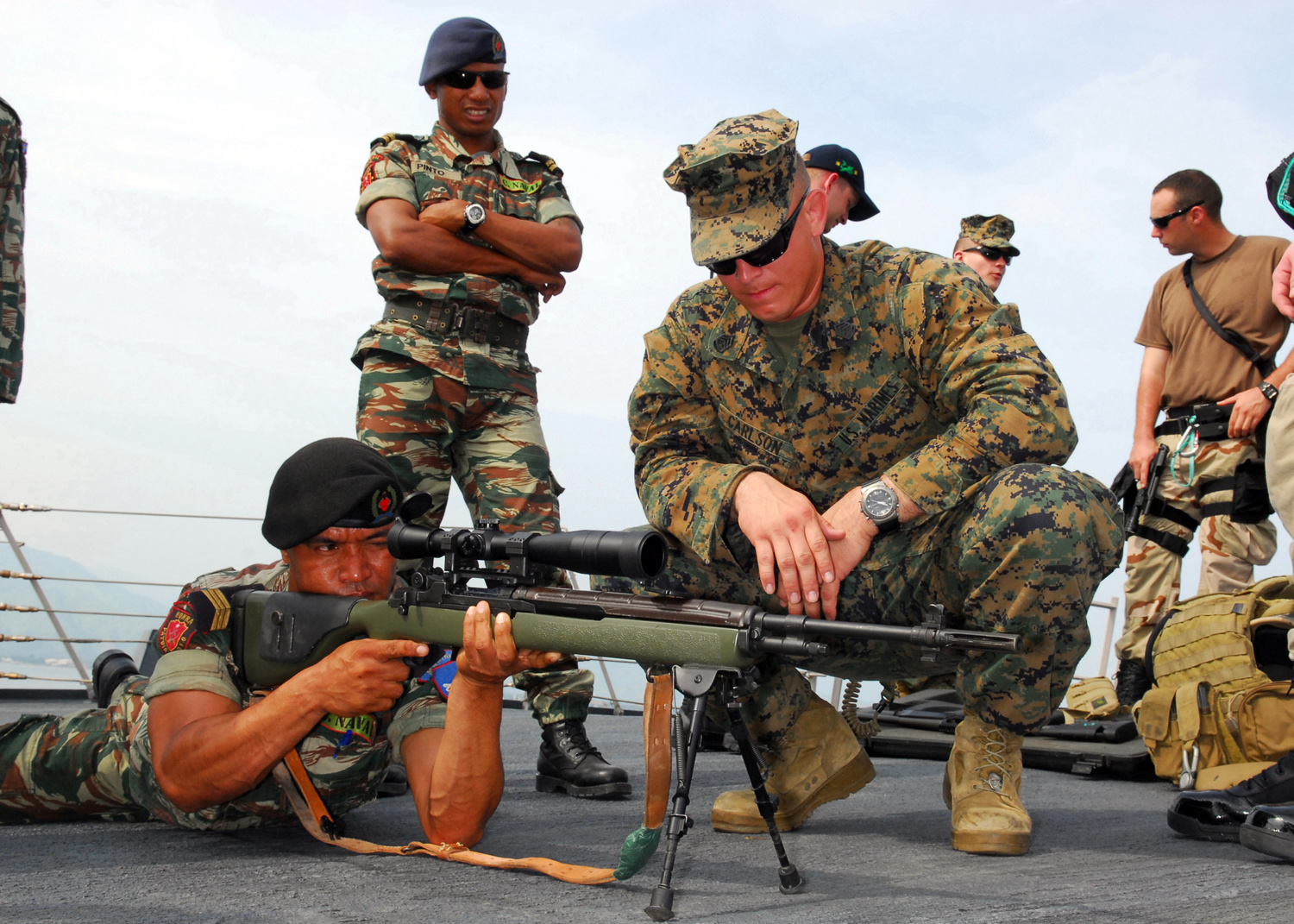
East Timor soldier with an M14

The DMR was previously used by Marine Corps FAST Companies and by the 4th Marine Expeditionary Brigade (Anti-Terrorism). Explosive Ordnance Disposal Teams use them to safely shoot at mines or other types of explosives that cannot be disarmed from a safe distance.

The DMR was previously used by USMC Scout Sniper Teams.

== See also ==
- The M21 and M25 Sniper Weapons Systems, also based on the M14
- M110 Semi-Automatic Sniper System

== Bibliography ==
- Green, Michael (2004). Weapons of the Modern Marines. ISBN 978-0760316979.
- Pushies, Fred (2011). MARSOC: U.S. Marine Corps Special Operations Command. ISBN 978-0760340745.
