= Match grade =

Quality standards for firearms and ammunition

Match grade frequently refers to quality firearm parts and ammunition that are suitable for a competitive match. Sometimes it also refers to other devices and parts that are made with high precision in mind.

== Description ==
In firearms, the term is used to refer to ammunition and gun parts that are designed and manufactured in such a way that they have a relatively narrow tolerance and high level of accuracy. No standards are defined for its qualification and as such it is more of a relative term. In addition to its use in shooting sports, match grade equipment is often employed by military and law enforcement sharpshooters.

Thus, many gun manufacturers use the term "match grade" to describe their products. For instance, the Heckler & Koch Mark 23 weapons system is considered so specifically tooled for combat that it is match grade, one primary reason that the pistol and its components were selected by the United States Special Operations Command (SOCOM) for service. The Springfield Armory XD-M (with 'M' standing for match) features components that were more advanced than those of the regular XD pistol, such as sights and the barrel, which are deemed match grade. The magazines have extended capacities for target or combat shooting and the slide also has a more durable melonite finish. SIG Sauer released a line of self-defense ammunition, Elite Performance Ammunition, which they deem to be match grade, for increased performance and reliability.

Manufacturing match grade ammunition and other parts requires extremely tight tolerances and quality control. It is not unusual for match-grade ammunition and components to cost ten times more than comparable non-match equivalents, owing both to the increased labor expended in creation and much more rigorous testing. Match grade ammunition is often subjected to higher randomized testing to ensure consistency and accuracy, reducing the statistical likelihood of a dud round. Match grade components are often selected by testing the performance of multiple, identically configured firearms, and then eliminating those that don't perform to expectation.

== See also ==
- Glossary of firearms terminology
