= M110 =

M110 or M-110 may refer to:

- HMS Ramsey (M110)
- M110 155mm Cartridge, a U.S. Army chemical artillery shell
- Mercedes-Benz M110 engine, a 2.8L engine produced from 1973 to 1986
- Messier 110 (M110), an elliptical galaxy in the constellation Andromeda
- M110 howitzer, a United States Army self-propelled howitzer
- M110 Semi-Automatic Sniper System, a semi-automatic rifle
- M110A1 Rifle, a semi-automatic rifle
- M-110 (Michigan highway), a state highway in Michigan
