= Designated marksman rifle =

Scoped high-precision rifles used by infantry

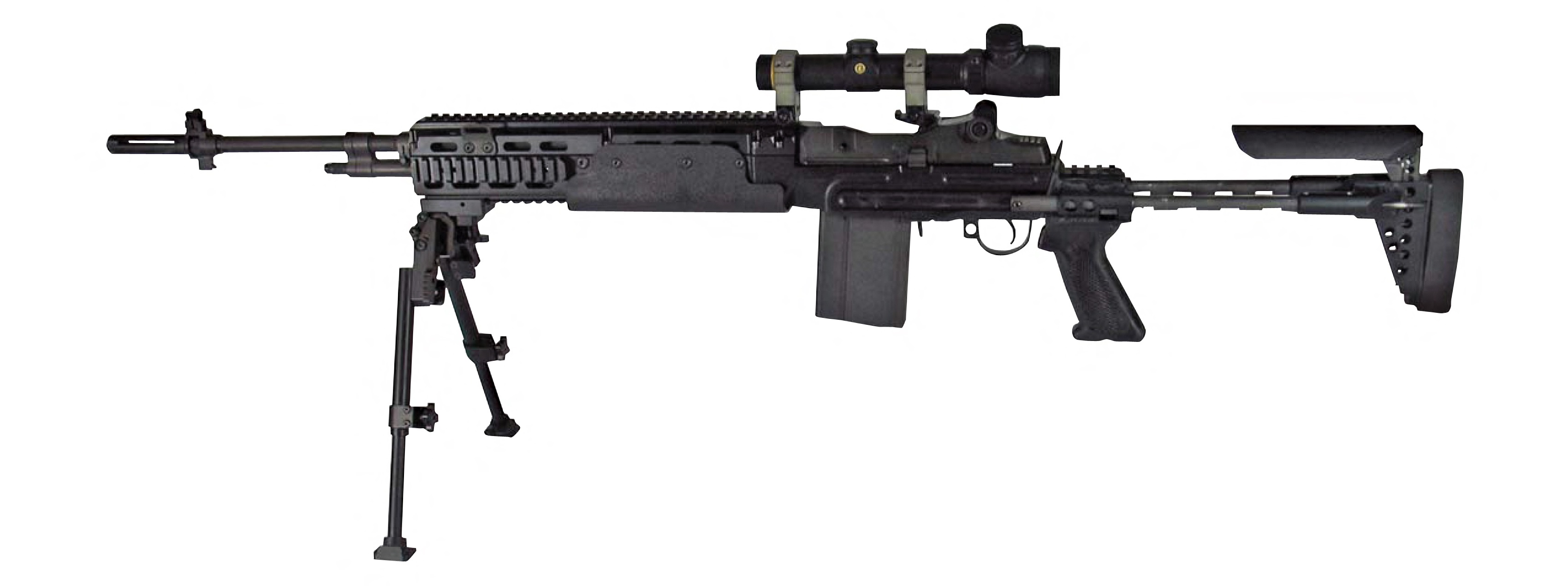
A Mk 14 Enhanced Battle Rifle, a marksman rifle based on the M14 rifle, itself also widely used as a marksman rifle

A designated marksman rifle (DMR) is a modern scoped high-precision rifle used by infantry in the designated marksman (DM) role. It generally fills the engagement range gap between a service rifle and a dedicated sniper rifle, at around 300–600 metres (330–660 yd).

DMRs are distinguished from sniper rifles in that they are semi-automatic to provide higher rates of fire (with some also having selective fire to switch to burst or automatic) and have larger magazine capacities (10, 20, or 30 rounds depending on the firearm and operational requirements) to allow rapid engagement of multiple targets.

DMRs have to be effective, in terms of hit rates and terminal ballistics, at application ranges exceeding those of ordinary assault rifles and battle rifles, but do not require the extended-range performance of a dedicated sniper rifle. DMRs often share some basic characteristics with sniper rifles when compared to other weapons carried in the DM's platoon. They typically have telescopic sights for more detailed observation and aiming, often also quick-deployed bipod for optimized accuracy, reduced recoil and better stability, and an adjustable stock for better ergonomics.

== Comparison to sniper rifles, battle rifles, and carbines ==
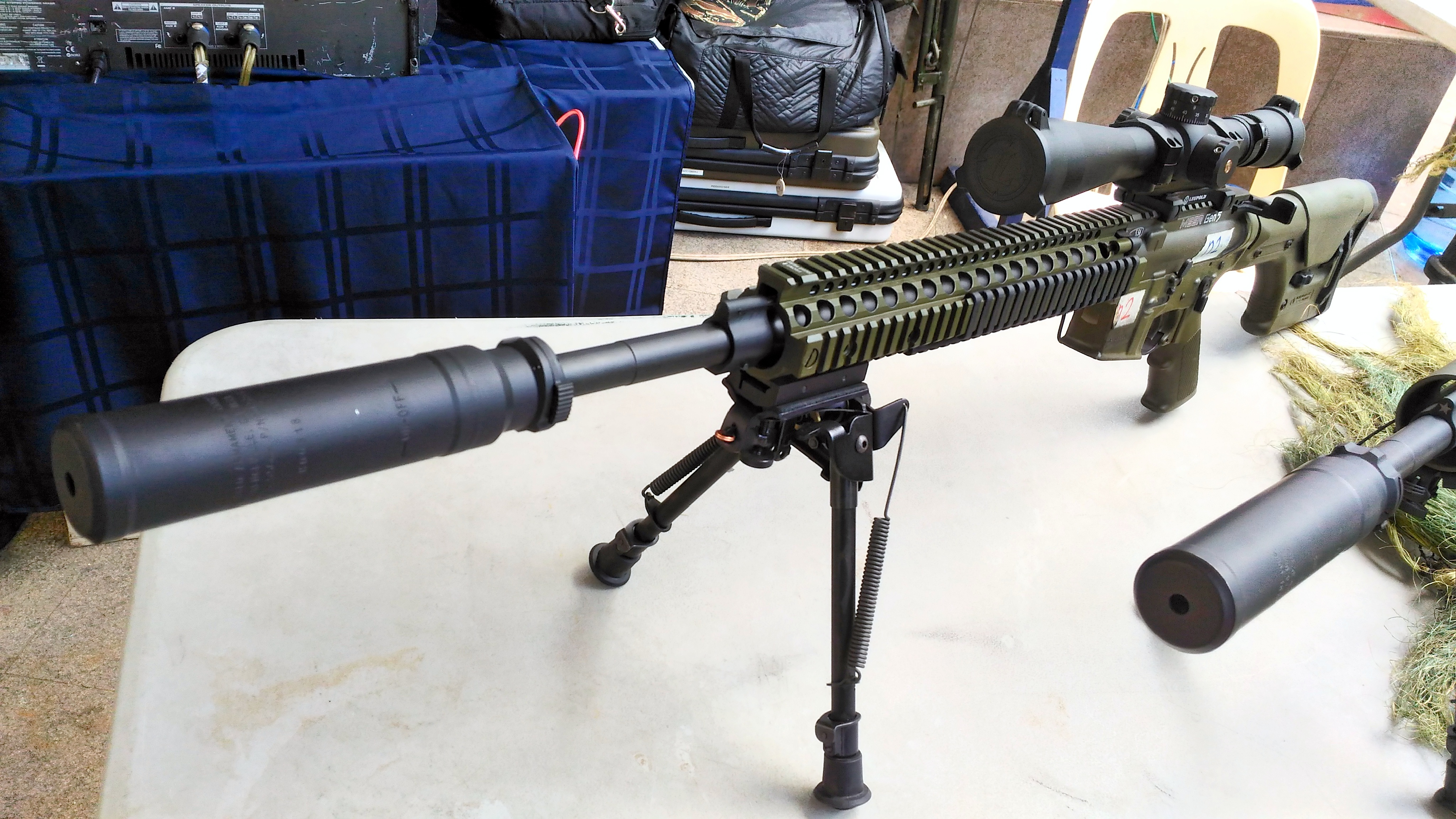
A Marine Scout Sniper Rifle, a Philippine Marine Corps marksman rifle designed from a heavily modified M16A1

Most designated marksman rifles are based on modified designs of an assault rifle currently issued by a nation's military, or on a battle rifle that was formerly issued. The ammunitions used are often of the same caliber as that of the machine guns within the same combat unit, typically a fully powered cartridge such as the 7.62 mm NATO. For example, battle rifles such as the M14, FN FAL, AR-10 and Heckler & Koch G3 were largely replaced during the 1980s and 1990s by modern assault rifles firing the 5.56 mm NATO intermediate cartridge for standard riflemen, but many were accurized and retained as DMRs.

Conversely, some nations have also built rifles that were designed for the designated marksman from the ground up. Examples include the Soviet SVD and Chinese QBU-88.

=== Sights ===
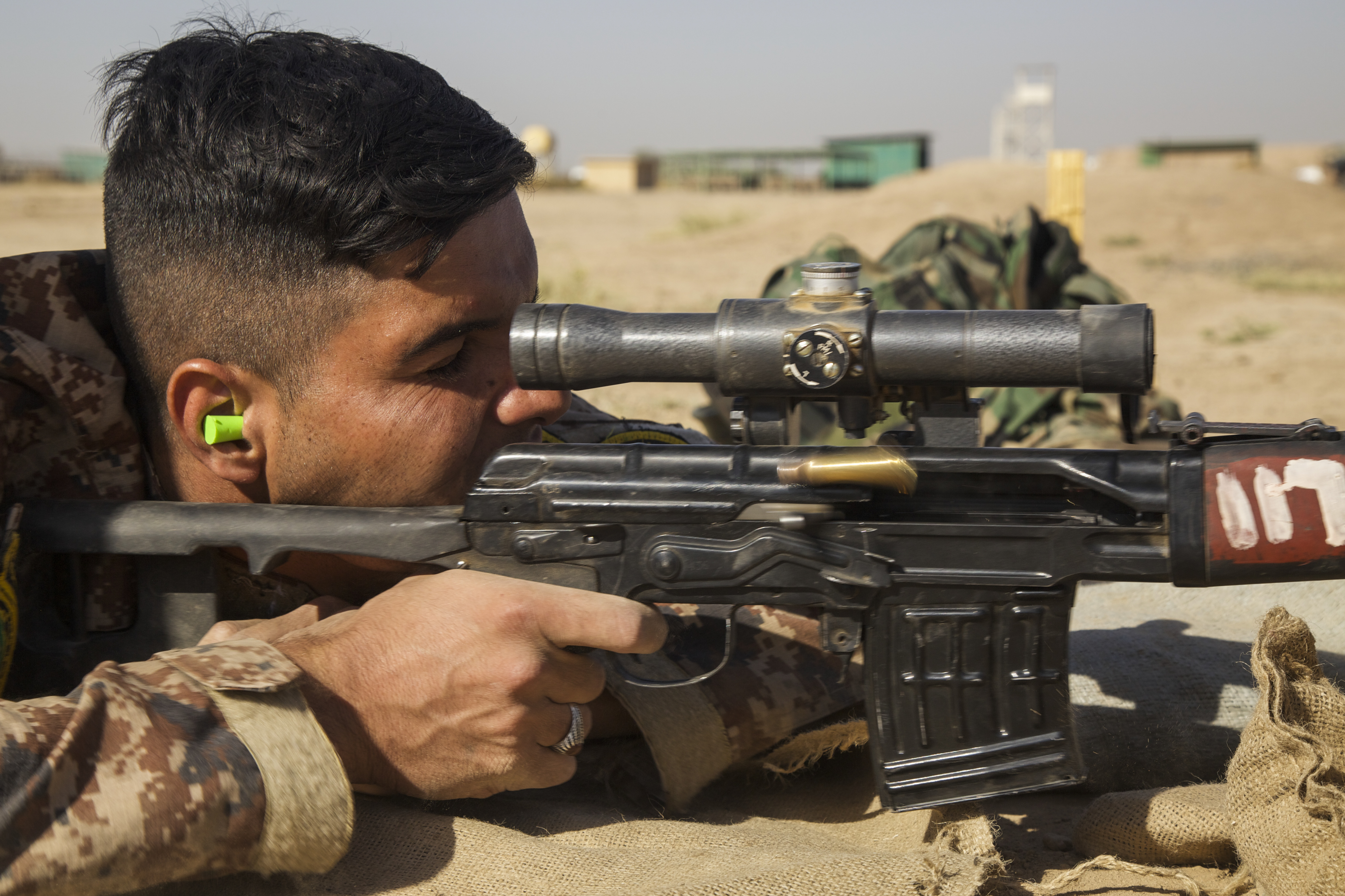
An Iraqi Ground Forces soldier aiming through his SVD rifle's POSP sight

Some designated marksman rifles will have some type of optical sight with a higher magnification level than the standard-issue rifle. For example, the Squad Designated Marksman Rifle issued to U.S. Army marksmen is frequently fitted with a Trijicon 4× ACOG, while the standard-issue M4 carbine is often equipped with an unmagnified Aimpoint CompM2 or CompM4. Commonly, the sighting system will be the only difference between the standard rifle and the designated marksman rifle, as is the case with the F88S DMR issued to the Australian Army.

Sniper rifles tend to have even greater magnification than designated marksman rifles, fitting their increased effective range in comparison, as is the case with the M110 SASS used by the U.S. Army, equipped with a Leupold 3.5-10× variable-power scope. However, some designated marksman rifles, such as the Mk 12 Special Purpose Rifle or the Squad Advanced Marksman Rifle are fitted with scopes with similar magnification.

=== Barrels ===
In some cases, the designated marksman rifle will have a longer barrel than the standard issued rifle. For example, until October 2015, when the M4 carbine was approved as the new standard-issue rifle, the M16A4 rifle was still standard issue throughout the United States Marine Corps. The barrel on the Mk 12 Special Purpose Rifle, the current rifle used by the squad designated marksman in the USMC, is only 457 mm (18 in) long - 50 mm (2 in) shorter than the barrel on the standard rifle. This is no longer the case, however, as the M4 carbine has a barrel length of only 370 mm (14.5 in). Also, some rifles, such as the F88S Austeyr, have a barrel that is the same length as the standard service rifle. The FD-200 has an accurized barrel, also found on designated marksman rifles.

Most sniper rifles, such as the Accuracy International Arctic Warfare, have a barrel with a length of 610 mm (24 in) or greater. Only the Dragunov sniper rifle (SVD) and similar designated marksman rifles have a barrel of this length. The designated marksman rifles based on the M14 have barrels 460–560 mm (18–22 in) long.

=== Ammunition ===
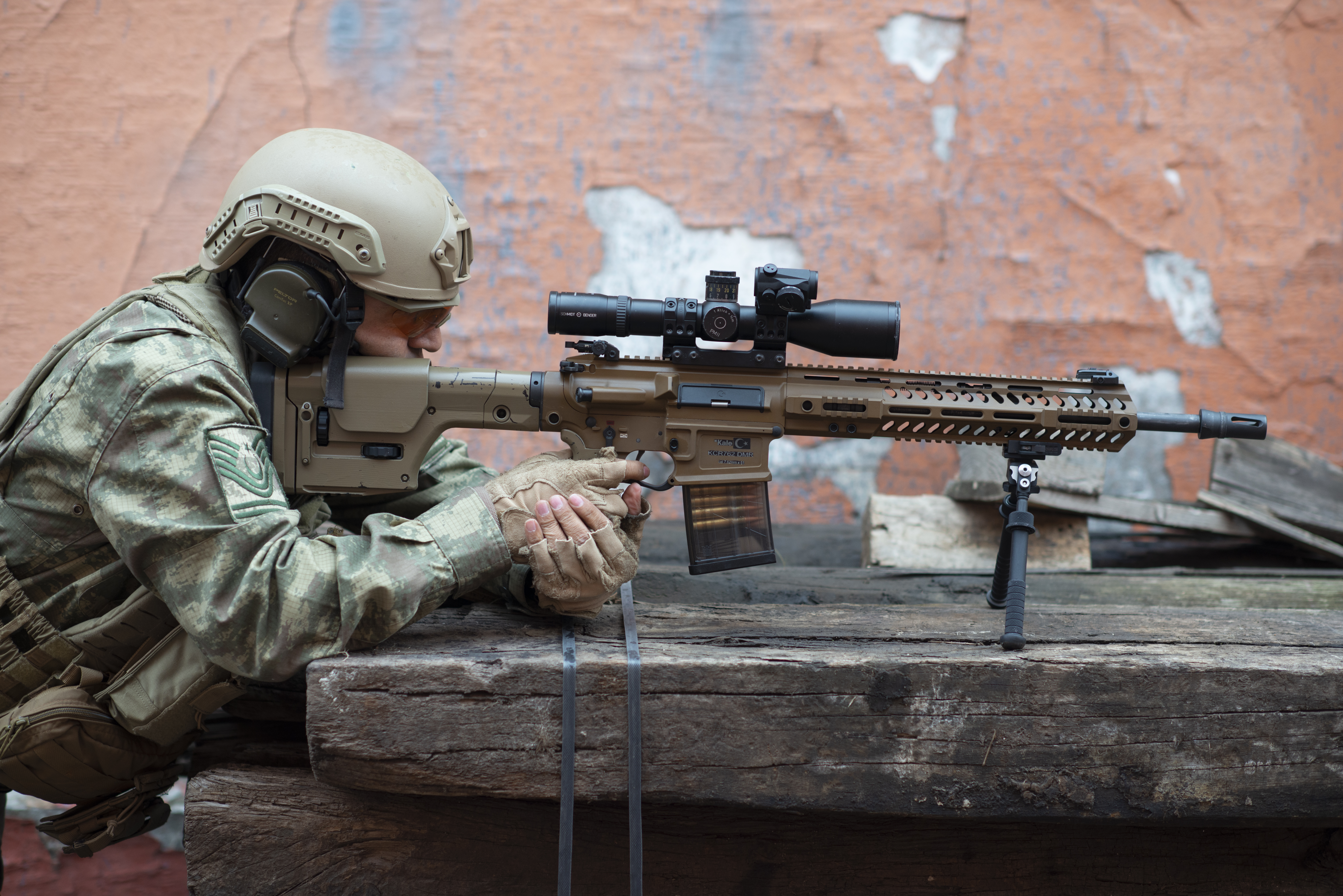
A Kale Kalip KMR762, a Turkish DMR chambered in 7.62×51mm NATO

In most cases, a designated marksman rifle will share the caliber and possibly even the ammunition type used by standard-issue rifles. DM rifles may be issued with standard ball ammunition, or special match grade loads, such as 7.62 mm NATO 'M118LR' sniper round. Sniper rifles are (almost exclusively) deployed with match grade ammunition in order to take advantage of their full effective range and accuracy potential; in addition, some sniper rifles are chambered for specialized ammunition, such as .338 Lapua Magnum or .338 Norma Magnum, that they do not share with common weapons.

In the U.S. military, designated marksman rifles chambered for 5.56 mm NATO have available the 5 g (77 grain) match grade Mk 262 Mod 0/1 (Note: In the U.S. military, 7.62×51 mm (.308 rounds) are most commonly used for marksmen, as they are cheaper.) cartridge that enhances the effective range to roughly 600–800 m (2,000–2,600 ft).

The effective range of semi-automatic rifles chambered in .338 Lapua Magnum or .338 Norma Magnum can exceed 1,400 m (4,600 ft).

=== Action ===
All designated marksman rifles in use today are semi-automatic, some with select fire. Sniper rifles are generally bolt-action rifles, but can also be semi-automatic.

== Designated marksman rifles in service by nation ==
- Argentina: FAMTD is a variant of the FN FAL with an accurised barrel, sniper stock and bipod.
- Australia
  - F88S Austeyr; 5.56 NATO standard-issue rifle, fitted with an enhanced optic is issued to one rifleman in each fire team in the Australian Army.
  - SR-25; 7.62mm NATO sniper rifle is often used to provide fire support.
  - HK417; 7.62mm NATO battle rifle, interim F88S replacement for Afghanistan deployments.
  - Mk 14 Enhanced Battle Rifle; 7.62mm NATO rifle is in limited service.
- Austria: The Steyr AUG HBAR-T, is a longer heavier-barreled version of the Steyr AUG designed for use as a designated marksman rifle that can be fitted with a variety of optical sights.
- Bangladesh
  - The Type 85 is the most seen weapon used as designated marksman rifle by the Bangladesh Army.
  - Different variants of the Heckler & Koch G3 7.62mm NATO rifles modified with scopes and other tactical upgrades are used as designated marksman rifle as well.
- Canada: The Colt Canada C20 Semi-Automatic Sniper Weapon is sometimes identified in publications as a DMR
- Chile: The FD-200 is a variant of the SIG 542 with an accurised barrel, sniper stock and bipod.
- China:
  - The QBU-88 is a designated marksman rifle deployed by the People's Liberation Army and People's Armed Police, intended for aimed semi-automatic fire at ranges beyond the capabilities of standard infantry assault rifles.
  - The QBU-191 is designated marksman rifle with an 800 m (870 yd) effective range, fitted with an accurized long, heavy free-floating barrel, extended handguard, 30-round box magazine and a QMK-191 variable-magnification (4-15×) telescopic sight. Selective fire with the full-auto mode is retained on the marksman rifle, improving its fire suppression capability.
  - The Type 79 is the designated marksman rifle in Cold War era and still remains in use with reserve forces.
- Czech Republic: CZ BREN 2 PPS
- Denmark: The Heckler & Koch HK417 was the main DMR in use, by the Royal Danish Army, but is pr 2021 transitioning to Colt Canada C20.
- France: The FN SCAR is a designated marksman rifle fielded by the French Army, alongside the HK 417, retiring the FR F2 sniper rifle.
- Germany
  - The German Army uses the G3A3ZF-DMR, a modified version of the Heckler & Koch G3 battle rifle, as a designated marksman rifle and recently introduced the G28.
  - The Heckler & Koch HK417 is chambered for 7.62mm NATO and has been adopted by several nations for use as a designated marksman rifle.
- Georgia
  - Galatz is standard-issue marksman rifle of Georgian Armed Forces, though some reserve and second line units still use SVD.
  - Some Georgian Special Army and Police units use VSS Vintorez, TAR-21, AR-10 and M4A1 configured as marksman rifles
- Hungary
  - The SVD is the main designated marksman rifle for the Hungarian Armed Forces.
  - Hungary manufactures the bull-pup designed Szép sniper rifle chambered for 7.62×51mm NATO.
  - Hungarian Special Forces uses also the M24 Sniper Weapon System.
  - Hungarian Armed Forces designed the anti-material sniper weapons family called Gepárd.
- India
  - The SVD is the DMR for the Indian Army. Different variants of the INSAS family of weapons modified with scopes and other tactical upgrades are used as DMRs as well.
  - The IMI Tavor TAR-21 and the IMI Galil chambered for the 7.62 NATO round are issued to units of the Special Forces of India as a DMR.
  - The SIG Sauer SIG716i chambered for the 7.62 NATO Round are issued for the frontline units of the Indian Army as a battle rifle/DMR.
- Indonesia:
  - The Pindad SS2-V4 is a designated marksman rifle said to be used by Kopassus. It is based on the Pindad SS2, with a lengthened barrel and a telescopic scope mounted on a Picatinny rail.
  - Pindad SPM-1 is a DMR variant of Pindad SS2, chambered for 5.56x45mm NATO. Used by Kostrad Indonesian Army.
  - Pindad SS3 is a DMR variant of Pindad SS2, chambered for 7.62x51mm NATO.
- Iran: The locally produced G3A6 fitted with Hadaf 3 telescopic sight is used as a designated marksman rifle by Iran Army special forces and Iranian Police Special Unit.
- Iraq: The Tabuk is an adaptation of the Zastava M70 assault rifle used as a designated marksman rifle by the Iraqi Army. It is chambered for 7.62×39mm
- Israel
  - The Israel Defense Forces formerly used the Galatz as a designated marksman rifle. The Galatz is a variant of the Galil assault rifle chambered for 7.62mm NATO.
  - The M4A1 is used as a marksman rifle, equipped with Harris bipod and Trijicon ACOG telescopic sights. The M4A1 replaced the M16A2, which is still used by some infantry reserve units.
  - The STAR-21 Tavor is a variant of the Tavor assault rifle used as a designated marksman rifle by the Israeli Defense Forces. It is fitted with a picatinny rail that allows for the attachment of various optical sights (typically an ACOG scope) and a bipod.
  - The IWI Tavor X95-L, a variant of the Tavor with a longer 38 cm barrel, is used as a DMR.
  - The Barrett REC10 is used as a DMR by special forces.
  - The Arad 7 S.R/DMR, a variant of the Arad 7 rifle chambered for 7.62x51mm NATO and used by the IDF and special units of the Israeli Border Police.
- Italy: The Beretta ARX200 is used as a designated marksman rifle.
- Japan: The Howa Type 64 is used as a marksman rifle.
- Myanmar: BA100, MAS-1 MK-I and MAS-1 MK-II are locally made designated marksman rifle that are used extensively in the country's counter-insurgency campaign
- New Zealand: LMT LM308MWS; 7.62mm NATO rifle used by the New Zealand Army under the designation DMW.
- Norway: HK417; 7.62mm NATO gas-piston battle rifle.
- Philippines:
  - The Philippine Marine Scout Snipers developed and use the Marine Scout Sniper Rifle, a derivative of the M16 rifle.
  - The Philippine Army uses the M14 as a marksman rifle, while some units also use the SR-25 in limited numbers. Newer M16-derived marksman rifles such the Squad Designated Marksman Rifle (SDMR) and the Special Purpose Rifle (SPR) in 5.56mm NATO have been introduced to replace the M14 and have been in service with the Army's 1st Scout Ranger Regiment since 2015. More recently the SIG 716 DMR has been adopted by the Philippine Army as its new standard designated marksman rifle in 7.62 NATO, with 829 units having been delivered as of early 2020.
- Portugal: The Portuguese Army uses the Heckler & Koch G28E and FN SCAR H PR as a marksman rifle.
- Romania: The PSL (rifle) is a purpose-built designated marksman rifle chambered for 7.62×54mmR based on a modified Kalashnikov action. It is similar in appearance to the SVD, though the two rifles share little in common.
- Russia
  - The SVD was the first rifle designed from the outset as what is now known as a designated marksman rifle.
  - The VSS Vintorez was developed by the Spetsnaz undercover or clandestine units, developed as the first integrally suppressed marksman rifle.
  - The Dragunov SVU is a bullpup variant of the SVD rifle
  - The VSK-94 is a sniper variant of the 9A-91, cheaper alternative than the VSS Vintorez
  - The Chukavin SVCh is starting (2024) to replace the SVD in the Army of Russian Federation.
- South Africa
  - Accurised former standard service South African Defence Force R1 rifles are used by the South African Army as designated marksman rifles. Being phased out in favour of the new R4 DMR modified rifle being introduced at section level.
  - Scoped and accurised Vektor R4 rifles are used as designated marksman rifles by soldiers of the South African Army.
- Switzerland
  - The Swiss Armed Forces use the standard issue SIG550 with a Kern 4×24 telescopic sight as a marksman rifle.
  - SIG716 DMR Gen2 replacing SG 550.
  - The Swiss Armed Forces are taking SIG751 SAPR battle rifles to get in use as marksman rifles
- United Kingdom
  - L129A1; a 7.62 NATO, 16 in (410 mm) barrel variant of the SR-25 developed by Lewis Machine and Tool Company has been procured for use in Afghanistan. A 6× power ACOG is the standard-issue sight.
- United States
  - The M14 rifle has formed the basis of several designated marksman rifles used by the United States Military:
    - Mk 14 Enhanced Battle Rifle: Used by the United States Army and Navy SEALs
    - M14SE Crazy Horse: Used by the 101st Airborne Division and the 2nd Infantry Division of the US Army.
    - M39 Enhanced Marksman Rifle: Used by the United States Marine Corps, replacing the United States Marine Corps Designated Marksman Rifle
  - The M16 rifle has formed the basis of several designated marksman rifles used by the United States Military:
    - Colt Model 655 and 656: Never standardized. Predecessor to other M16-based designated marksman rifles.
    - SDM-R: Used by the United States Army in limited numbers
    - SAM-R: Used by the United States Marine Corps. Replaced by the Mk 12 Special Purpose Rifle
    - Mk 12 Special Purpose Rifle: Used by the United States Navy SEALs, Rangers. Replacing the SAM-R in United States Marine Corps service.
    - M38 SDMR (Squad Designated Marksman Rifle): 5.56×45mm USMC Designated Marksman Rifle, replacing Mk 12 SPR
  - The AR-10 rifle has formed the basis of several designated marksman rifles used by the United States Military:
    - SR-25 Mk 11: Used by the United States Marine Corps, United States Navy SEALs, and the United States Army. Replaced by the SSR Mk 20.
    - M110 Semi-Automatic Sniper System used by the United States Army and United States Marine Corps replacing some M39 and all SR-25 Mk 11.
  - The Heckler & Koch HK417 in variant Sniper has been adopted by Delta Force of the United States Army and SEAL Team Six of the United States Navy for use as a designated marksman rifle.
    - M110A1: A version of G28E-110 which is a derivative of a civilian variant of HK417 has been adopted by the Army to replace the M14 EBR, SDM-R, and other older DMRs.
  - The FN SCAR in variant Sniper Support Rifle (SSR) Mk 20 Mod 0 has been adopted by all branches of USSOCOM (e.g. SEALs, Rangers, Army Special Forces, MARSOC, AFSOC) replacing the SR-25 Mk 11.
- Serbia
  - The Zastava M76 is a designated marksman rifle based on a modified Kalashnikov action. It is chambered for 7.92×57mm Mauser. It has also been chambered in 7.62×51mm NATO and 7.62×54mmR.
  - The Zastava M91 is a purpose-built designated marksman rifle based on a modified Kalashnikov action and chambered for 7.62×54mmR.

== See also ==
- Assault rifle
- Battle rifle
- Sniper rifle
- Fully powered cartridge
- Intermediate cartridge
