= M110A2 =

M110A2 may refer to:

- M110 howitzer, an American-made self-propelled artillery system
- M110A2 SASS, an upgraded variant of the M110 Semi-Automatic Sniper System
