= Colt Canada C20 =

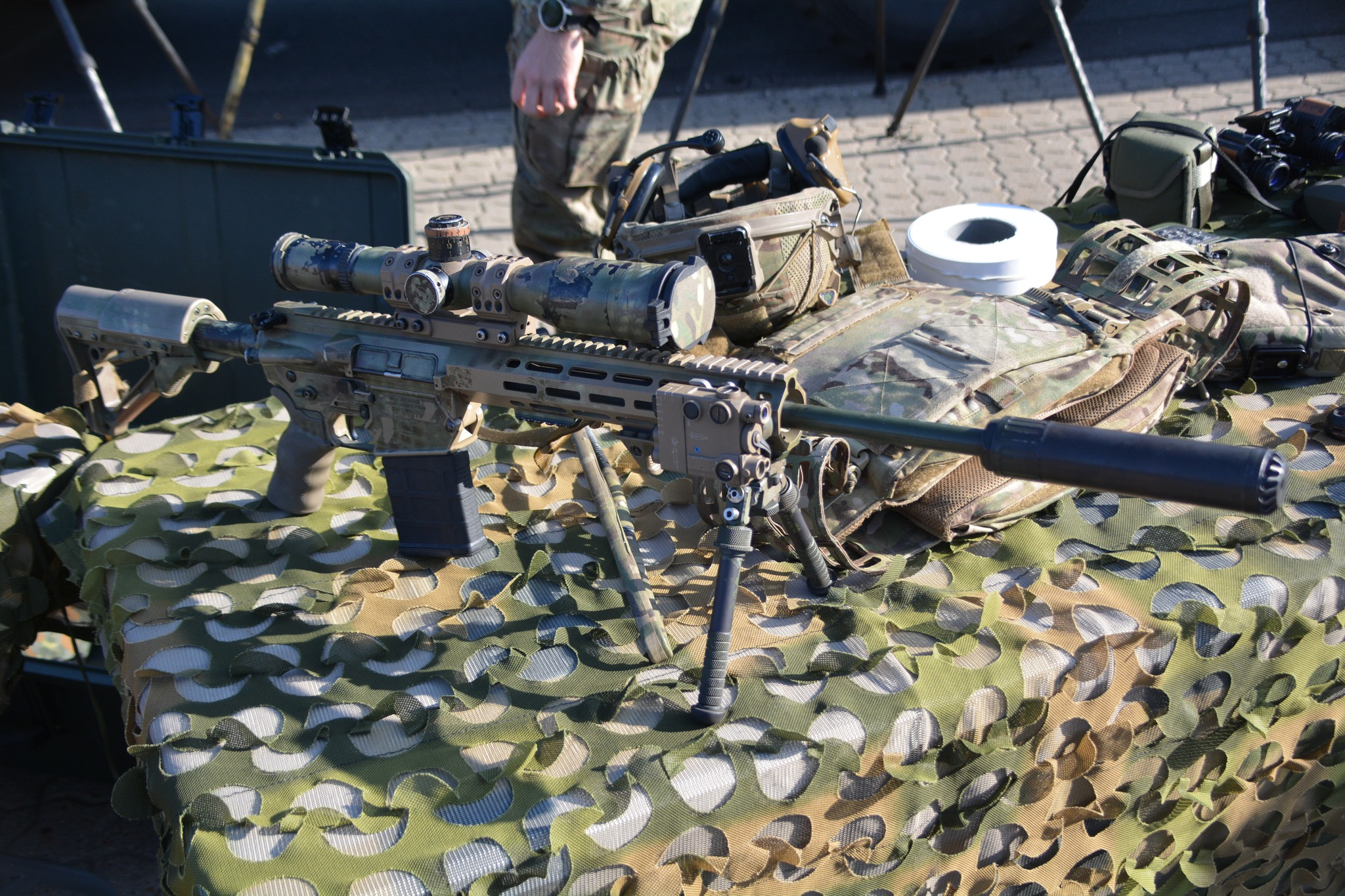
- Colt C20 shown at a public event at the Dragon Barracks in Holstebro (Denmark)
- Type: Sniper Rifle
- Place of origin: Canada

Service history
- In service: 2020–present
- Used by: See Users
- Wars: Russo-Ukrainian war

Production history
- Designed: 2019
- Manufacturer: Colt Canada

Specifications
- Mass: 4.1 kg (9.0 lb)
- Length: 965 mm (38.0 in)
- Barrel length: 447 mm (17.6 in)
- Cartridge: 7.62×51mm NATO
- Action: Gas-operated, internal piston, rotating bolt
- Rate of fire: Semi-automatic
- Muzzle velocity: 731.5 m/s (2,400 ft/s) (C181 Ammunition)
- Feed system: 20-round 7.62×51mm NATO magazine
- Sights: Schmidt & Bender 3-20×50 Ultra Short riflescope

The Colt Canada C20 is a 7.62×51mm NATO semi-automatic sniper rifle or designated marksman rifle created by Colt Canada, in response to a request by the Canadian Armed Forces for an Intermediate Sniper Weapon to replace their earlier 5.56mm C8 carbine in sniper sections.

The weapon is intended to enter service in the Canadian and Danish militaries, beginning in 2021. C20 rifles are fitted with the Schmidt & Bender 3-20×50 Ultra Short riflescope.

== Design ==
The C20 is a semi-automatic rifle that uses 20-round 7.62×51mm NATO box magazines. A major part of its design philosophy was making sure that it was reliable in extreme conditions, such as those specified in the NATO D/14 standards for safety, in which aspects of the weapon such as the kinematics, safety features, recoil, and barrel strength are put under the most severe strain. During these tests, the C20 fired 8,000 rounds without any stoppages and achieved an accuracy of 0.66 MOA over 144 five round groups. The C20 barrel features 4 groove rifling with a 1:254 mm (1 in 10 in) twist rate. Colt Canada also advertises the weapon's versatility, offering features such as:

- An optional chrome-lined barrel
- Upper receiver integrated with a previous Colt Canada weapon, the Modular Rail Rifle
- MIL-STD-1913 44 or 48 slot top rail with 0 MOA or 20 MOA integral incline
- M-LOK slots in the 3, 6 and 9 o’clock positions
- Double-stage trigger
- Adjustable buttstock

== Users ==
- Canada: First rifles delivered in November 2020, and to become standard issue in March 2021. A total of 272 rifles, including spare parts, were bought by the Canadian Department of National Defence for 8.5 million CAD (6.35 million USD).
- Denmark: Bought for the Danish Armed Forces to replace the Heckler & Koch HK417, the first rifles are set to be delivered in the first quarter of 2021. Designated the Finskyttegevaer, Kort (FINSKGV K). The Danish Defence Acquisition and Logistics Organization publicly confirmed their purchase of the rifles on 23 September 2020.
- Ukraine: C20s reportedly provided to Ukraine as of 2021, likely provided with Danish assistance.
