= Heckler & Koch HK417 =

Battle and designated marksman rifle

HK417
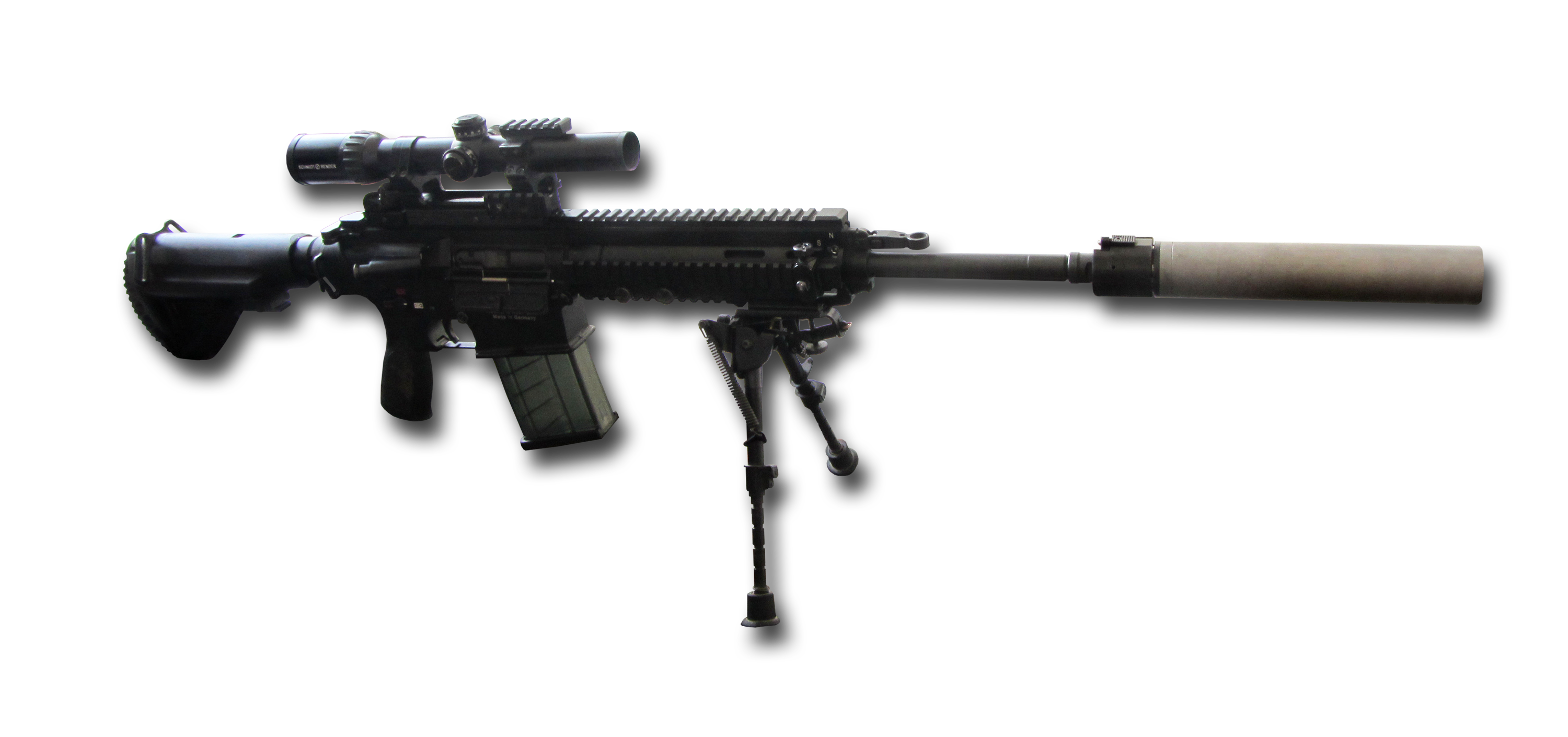
- A G27 rifle, an improved variant of the HK417
- Type: Battle rifle
- Place of origin: Germany

Service history
- In service: 2006–present
- Used by: See Users
- Wars: See Conflicts

Production history
- Designer: Heckler & Koch
- Manufacturer: Heckler & Koch
- Produced: 2006–present
- Variants: See Variants

Specifications
- Mass: A2 16.5″: 4.4 kg (9.7 lb); A2 20″: 4.74 kg (10.4 lb)
- Length: A2 16.5″: 994 mm (39.1 in) (stock extended); A2 20″: 1,082 mm (42.6 in) (stock extended)
- Barrel length: 419 mm (16.5 in) 508 mm (20.0 in)
- Width: 78 mm (3.1 in)
- Height: 213 mm (8.4 in)
- Cartridge: 7.62×51mm NATO
- Action: Gas-operated short-stroke piston, rotating bolt
- Rate of fire: 600 rounds/min
- Muzzle velocity: 750 m/s (2,500 ft/s) (16 in); 775 m/s (2,540 ft/s) (16.5 in); 789 m/s (2,590 ft/s) (20 in); 817 m/s (2,680 ft/s) (A2 20″)
- Effective firing range: A2 16.5″: 600 m (656.2 yd); A2 20″: 800 m (874.9 yd)
- Feed system: 10- or 20-round detachable box magazine
- Sights: Iron or optical sights (Picatinny rail)

The Heckler & Koch HK417 is a battle rifle designed and manufactured by Heckler & Koch.

Being the larger caliber version of the Heckler & Koch HK416, and chambered for the 7.62×51mm NATO rifle cartridge, it is intended for use where the penetrative power, stopping power, and range of the 5.56×45mm NATO HK416 would otherwise be insufficient. The HK417 is gas-operated, has a rotating bolt and is capable of selective fire.

The HK417 has been adopted for service by a number of armed forces, special forces, and police organizations throughout the world, including the Bundeswehr, United States Joint Special Operations Command, the United States Army, Russian Spetsnaz forces such as FSB Alpha Group, and others.

== Design and features ==
The HK417 is similar in internal design to the HK416, although the receiver and working parts are enlarged to suit the larger 7.62×51mm cartridge. The bolt is a seven-lug rotating type, which sits in a bolt carrier and operates in a forged alloy receiver resembling those of the Stoner-designed AR-10, AR-15 and M16 rifles.

Like the HK416, the HK417 is gas-operated with a short-stroke piston design similar to that of the Heckler & Koch G36. The short-stroke piston may be more reliable than the original direct impingement operation of the AR-15 design because, unlike these weapons, it does not vent propellant gases directly into the receiver, which deposits carbon fouling onto the bolt mechanism as well as heating it up.

The early HK417 prototype used 20-round magazines from the Heckler & Koch G3 rifle family, which did not feature a bolt hold-open device. Later prototypes, however, switched to a polymer magazine with bolt hold-open. The magazine resembles an enlarged version of the G36's transparent magazine, except without the pins for holding more than one magazine together.

== Use ==
Purchasers of the HK417 have typically intended it to complement lighter assault rifles chambered for less powerful intermediate cartridges (often 5.56×45mm NATO), for the designated marksman role. The HK417's greater accuracy, effective range, and penetration offset its greater expense, its lower rate of fire, and its smaller ammunition capacity both in magazine and carriage.

== Variants ==
=== Military and law enforcement ===
The HK417 models chambered for 7.62×51mm NATO available to the military and law enforcement market are:

- HK417 12″ 'Assaulter': carbine with 304.8 mm (12 in) standard barrel
- HK417 16″ 'Recce': "Recon" rifle with 406.4 mm (16 in) standard or accurized barrel
- HK417 20″ 'Sniper': "full size" rifle with 508.0 mm (20 in) accurized barrel

=== Improved model ===
The HK417A2 is an improved version. The design of the receiver, barrel interface, gas port and the bore axis alignment of the rifle have been further optimised to increase its accuracy and reliability. The German Army uses the HK417 A2 - 13″ with the designation G27.

As of 2013, the HK417A2 models chambered for 7.62×51mm NATO available to the military and law enforcement market are:

- HK417A2 - 13″: carbine with 330.2 mm (13 in) barrel
- HK417A2 - 16.5″: rifle with 419.1 mm (16.5 in) barrel
- HK417A2 - 20″: "full size" rifle with 508.0 mm (20 in) barrel

A barrel can be changed in under two minutes with simple tools. All HK417 barrels are cold hammer forged and chrome-lined and use a conventional lands and grooves bore profile with a twist rate of 1 turn in 279.4 mm (11.00 in). They are designed to function reliably with bullet weights ranging from 9.3 to 11.34 g (144 to 175 gr) and are threaded for a flash hider or sound suppressor. Optional accurized barrels with a different chrome treatment can provide up to 0.3 mil (1 moa) accuracy (with match grade ammunition).

==== G28 ====
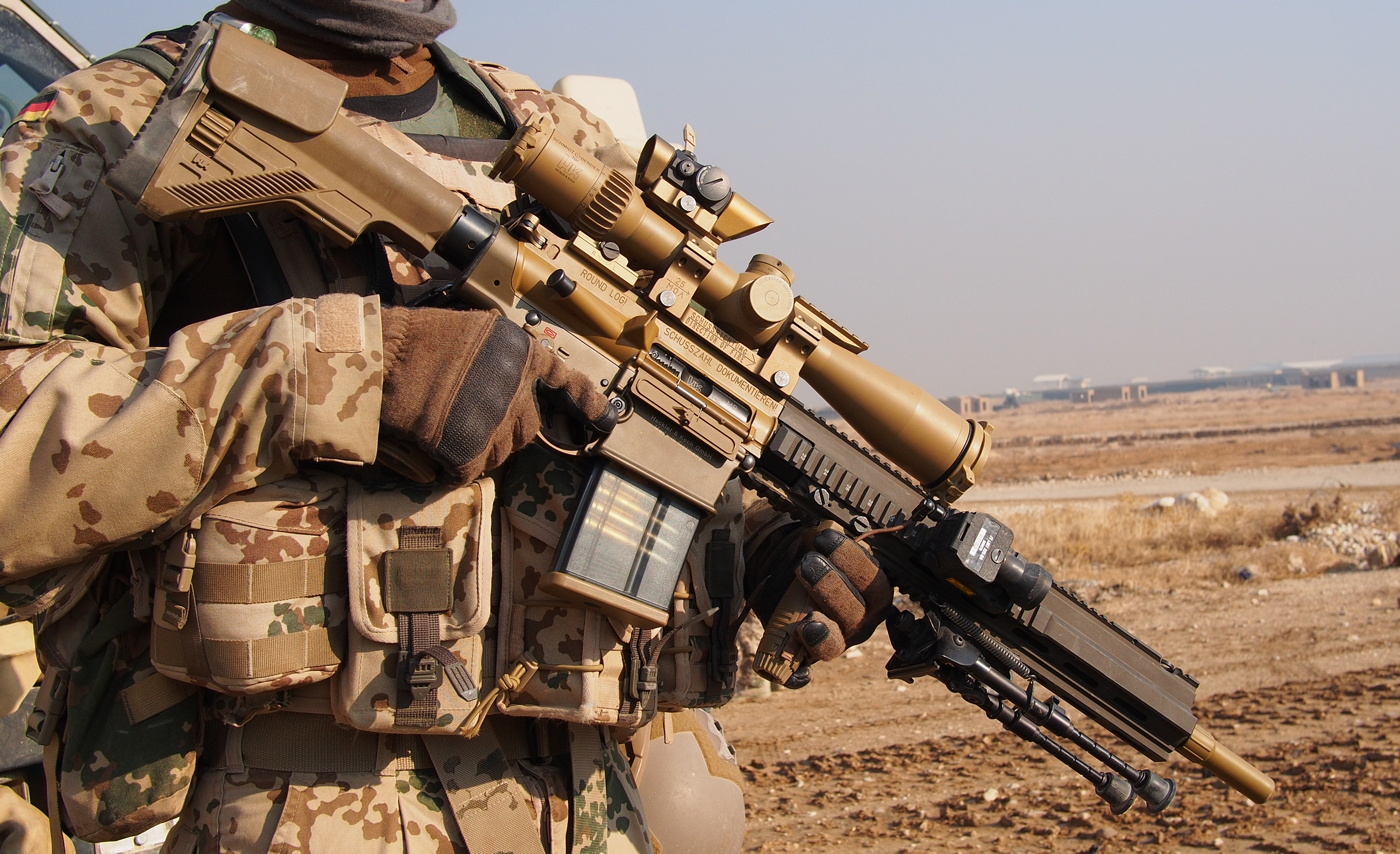
A G28 of the German Army

After using the HK417 as a stopgap designated marksman rifle under the G27 designation, the civilian MR308 was used to develop the G28, a designated marksman rifle for the German Bundeswehr (Federal Army) deployment to the War in Afghanistan. The semi-automatic G28 is chambered for 7.62×51mm NATO and has a factory warrantied accuracy of 45 mm dispersion at 100 meters (0.45 mil or 1.5 moa) when fired with 10 rounds using OTM/HPBT/Sierra Match King ammunition. The G28 features STANAG 4694 NATO Accessory Rails that are backwards-compatible with the STANAG 2324/MIL-STD-1913 Picatinny rails. The upper receiver is made from steel instead of HK's aluminium alloy. Approximately 75% of the parts are interchangeable with the HK417. There are two different versions of the G28: G28 E2 (Standard) with a Schmidt & Bender 3–20×50 PM II (modified to Bundeswehr requirements) and the G28 E3 (Patrol) with Schmidt & Bender 1–8×24 PM II. By October 2017, Heckler & Koch had renamed the G28 as the HK241, though G28 remains its Bundeswehr designation.

==== M110A1 ====
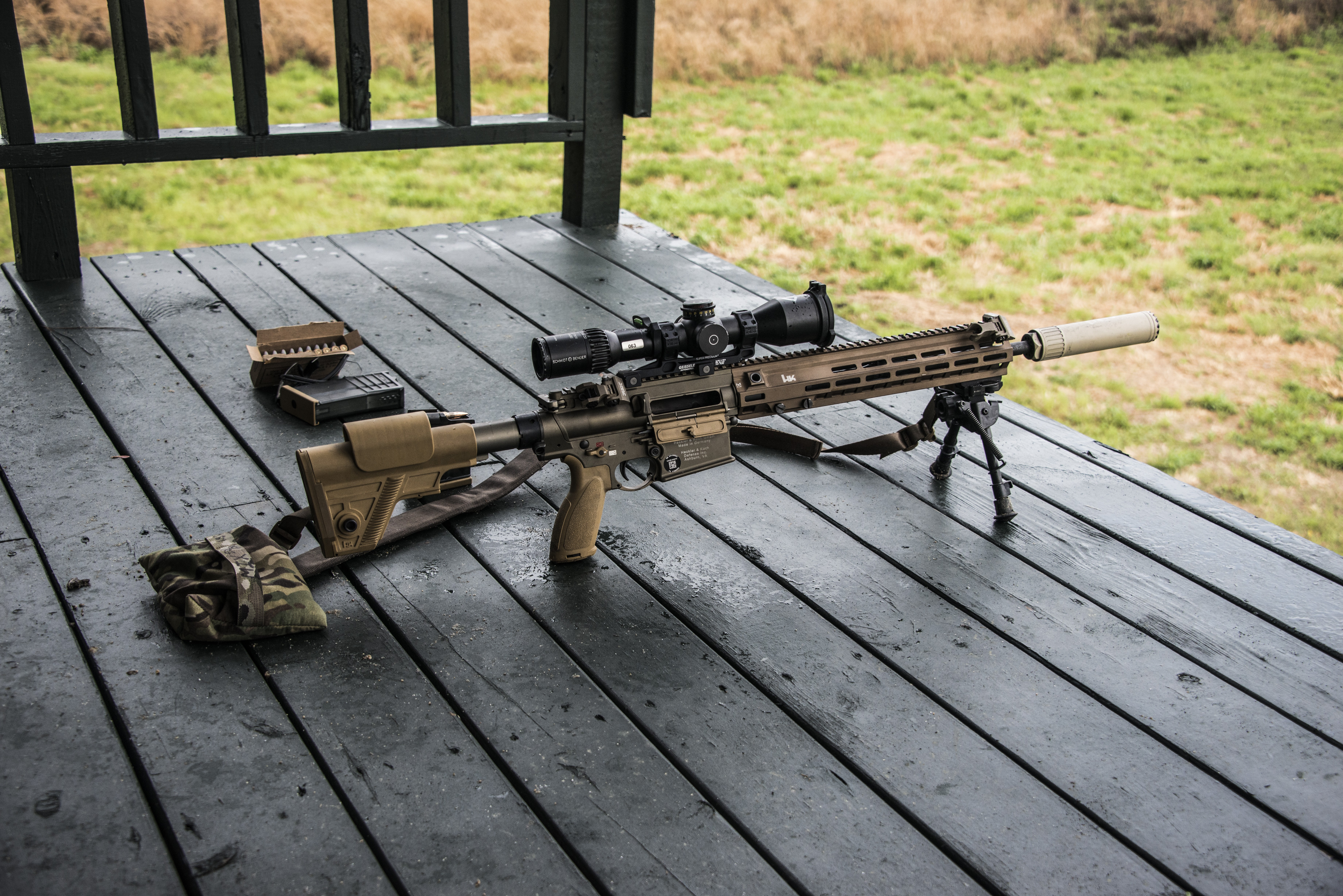
M110A1 compact Semi-Automatic Sniper System (CSASS)

The M110A1 CSASS is the U.S. Army's type designation for the Compact Semi-Automatic Sniper System. In April 2016, Heckler & Koch confirmed that a lighter version of the G28 had won the United States Army's CSASS contract to replace the M110 Semi-Automatic Sniper System. The M110A1 uses an aluminum upper receiver instead of steel to meet weight requirements, weighing 8.4 lb (3.8 kg) unloaded and reaching some 15 lb (6.8 kg) loaded and with accessories; the M110A1 features a Geissele M-LOK rail handguard, Schmidt & Bender 3–20×50 PM II Ultra Short telescopic sight, Geissele optic mount, OSS SRM6 suppressor, 6-9 Harris bipod and mount, and a collapsible stock with adjustable comb. In May 2018, the U.S. Marine Corps will begin receiving the CSASS, also to replace the M110. There has been some small-scale testing of the CSASS since then but no news of widespread fielding or adoption. However, the Army has shown small scale testing and use of the M110A2, an upgraded version of Knight's Armament Company's M110 SASS. The Navy and Marine Corps have also designated funding for a M110 SASS Product Improvement Program (PIP).

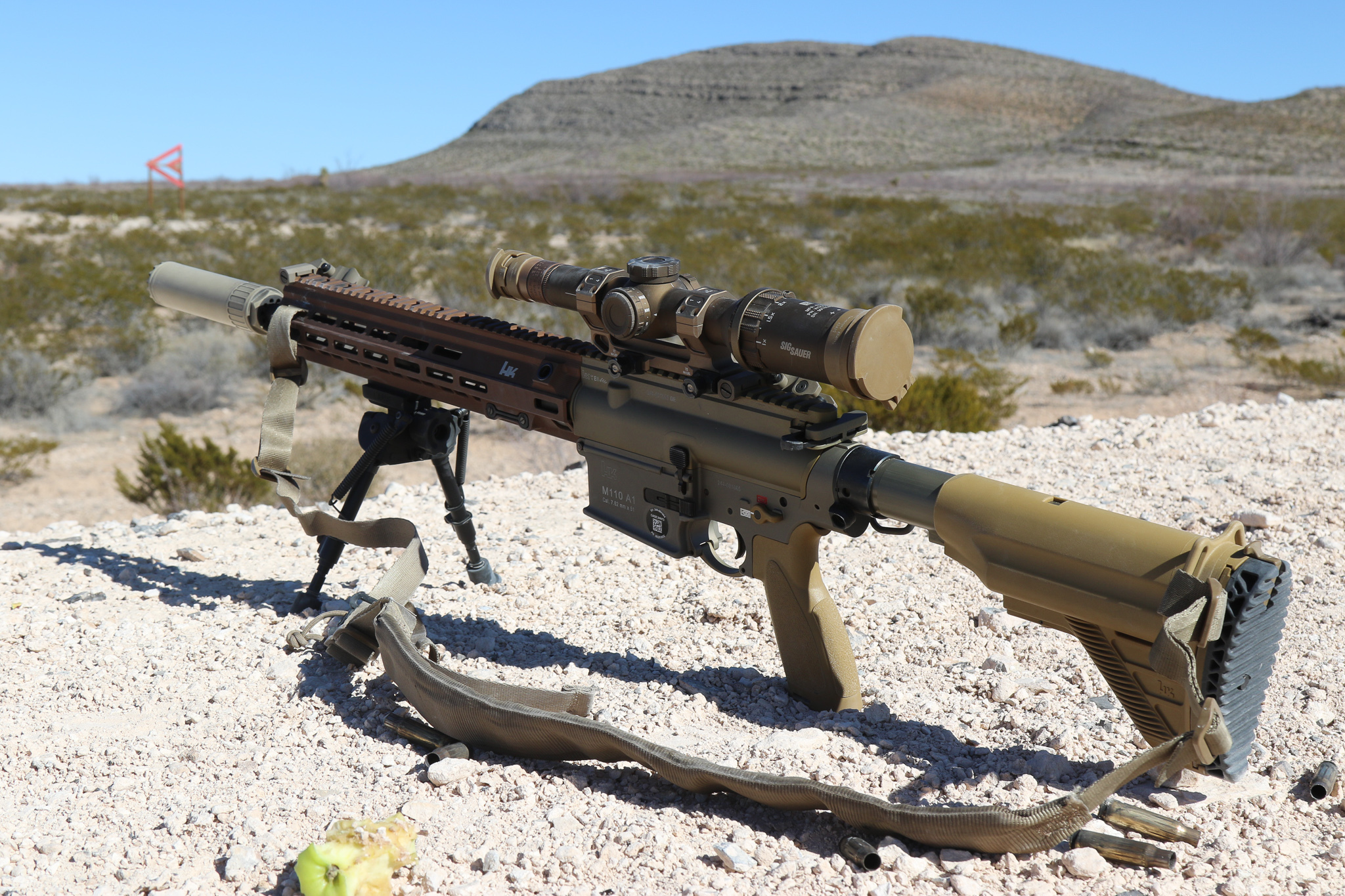
M110A1 Squad Designated Marksman Rifle (SDMR)

The M110A1 SDMR is a Squad Designated Marksman Rifle (SDMR) being issued to US Army infantry squads to replace the M14 EBR. In March 2018, the Army announced that a version of the G28E-110 would be issued to infantry squads as the service's standard SDMR. While undergoing evaluation by PEO Soldier, it was designated as M110E1. Issuing a 7.62×51mm NATO SDMR is meant to increase individual squads' ability to engage distant threats and defeat enemy body armor that standard 5.56×45mm NATO rounds cannot penetrate. The M14 EBR was previously issued for this role, but because it was based on an operational needs statement they had to be turned in by units at the end of a combat deployment. Unlike the sniper configuration, the SDMR model will be equipped with a different buttstock and barrel twist than the CSASS model. The SDMR model will also fire M80A1 Enhanced Performance Rounds or XM1158 Advanced Armor Piercing Rounds rather than sniper rounds. The marksman version is fitted with a simpler SIG TANGO6 1-6×24 telescopic sight to make quick adjustments between 0–600 m (0–656 yd) and features a red horseshoe dot for fast aiming and an illuminated Extended Range Bullet Drop Compensation (BDC) illuminated front focal plane reticle. It will also be fielded with a suppressor to lessen its sound signature. Roughly 6,000 are planned to be fielded with one per squad in infantry, engineer and scout formations. Early testing began with several U.S. Army combat units receiving the first M110A1 SDMRs in fall 2018. Fielding to all close combat squads is expected to be completed in late 2023.

=== Civilian ===
The MR308 is a civilian variant of the HK417, introduced in 2007 alongside the MR223, a civilian HK416. It is a semi-automatic rifle with several "sporterized" features. At the 2009 SHOT Show, the two rifles were introduced to the American civilian market as the MR762 and MR556, respectively. Since then, both were replaced by the improved MR762A1 and MR556A1.

== Users ==
Map with Heckler & Koch HK417 users in blue

| Country | Organization name | Model | Quantity | Date | Reference |
|---|---|---|---|---|---|
| Austria | Jagdkommando | HK417P | – | – | |
| Australia | Australian Army acquired 16″ 'Recce' variants paired with 6× ACOG for a designated marksman solution for use in Afghanistan and afterwards | 16″ 'Recce' | – | 2010 | |
| Brazil | Brazilian Army | – | – | 2012 | |
| Brazil | Federal Police of Brazil | – | – | 2012 | |
| Czech Republic | 601st Special Forces Group | – | – | – | |
| Denmark | Used by the Royal Danish Army as a designated marksman rifle. It was set to be replaced by the Colt Canada C20 DMR in the first quarter of 2021. | 20″ 'Sniper' | – | – | |
| Estonia | Estonian Special Operations Force uses it as a designated marksman rifle | – | – | – | |
| France | Commandement des Opérations Spéciales (COS) | HK417 A2 - 20" | – | – | |
| Germany | German Army uses the HK417 - 16″ as the G27P, 13″ as the G27K uses MR308 - 16.5" as the G28, 16.75" as the G210. | G27P, G27K, G28, G210 | – | – | |
| Indonesia | Denjaka (counter-terrorism special operations force of the Indonesian Navy). | G28 | – | – | |
| Indonesia | Taifib (Amphibious Reconnaissance Battalion of the Indonesian Navy). | G28 | - | - | |
| Indonesia | Bakamla (Indonesian Maritime Security Agency). | G28 | - | - | |
| Ireland | Defence Forces Army Ranger Wing sniper teams | – | – | 2010 | |
| Japan | Japan Ground Self-Defense Force, Special Forces Group (Japan); In January 2023, the G28 was selected as standard issue sniper rifle | – | – | 2014 to 2023 | |
| Luxembourg | Luxembourg Armed Forces; Being procured alongside HK416 from May 2023. | HK417 A2 | – | 2023 | |
| Malaysia | Pasukan Khas Laut sniper teams of the Royal Malaysian Navy | – | – | 2006 | |
| Netherlands | Korps Commandotroepen (KCT) of the Royal Netherlands Army acquired the 16″ 'Recce' paired with Aimpoint CompM2 or Schmidt & Bender 3–12×50 PM II | – | – | 2011 | |
| Norway | Norwegian Armed Forces uses it as a sharpshooter and designated marksman rifle | HK417N | – | 2007 | |
| Poland | Policja | – | – | – | |
| Portugal | Special Operations Troops Centre of the Portuguese Army | HK417, G28 | | | |
| Portugal | Core of Tactical Operations of Protection of the Portuguese Air Force | HK417, G28 | | | |
| Portugal | Special Operations Intervention Group (GIOE) of the National Republican Guard | HK417, G28 | | | |
| Portugal | Tactical Actions Group (GAT) of the Maritime Police | G28 | | | |
| Russia | Spetsnaz snipers of law enforcement agencies | MR308 | – | – | |
| Slovenia | Slovenian Special Police Unit (Specialna Enota Policije) | HK417 | – | – | |
| South Korea | 707th Special Mission Group | G28 | – | 2017 | |
| United Kingdom | Special Air Service | HK417 (L2A1) - 12", 16" and 20" | – | 2009 | |
| United States | United States Army | M110A1 | 3,643 (planned) | – | |
| Ukraine | Armed Forces of Ukraine | Supplied by the Netherlands | — | — | |

== Conflicts ==
=== 2000s ===
- War in Afghanistan (2001–2021)
- Insurgency in the North Caucasus

=== 2010s ===
- Armed conflict for control of the favelas in Greater Rio de Janeiro

=== 2020s ===
- Russian Invasion of Ukraine

== Gallery ==
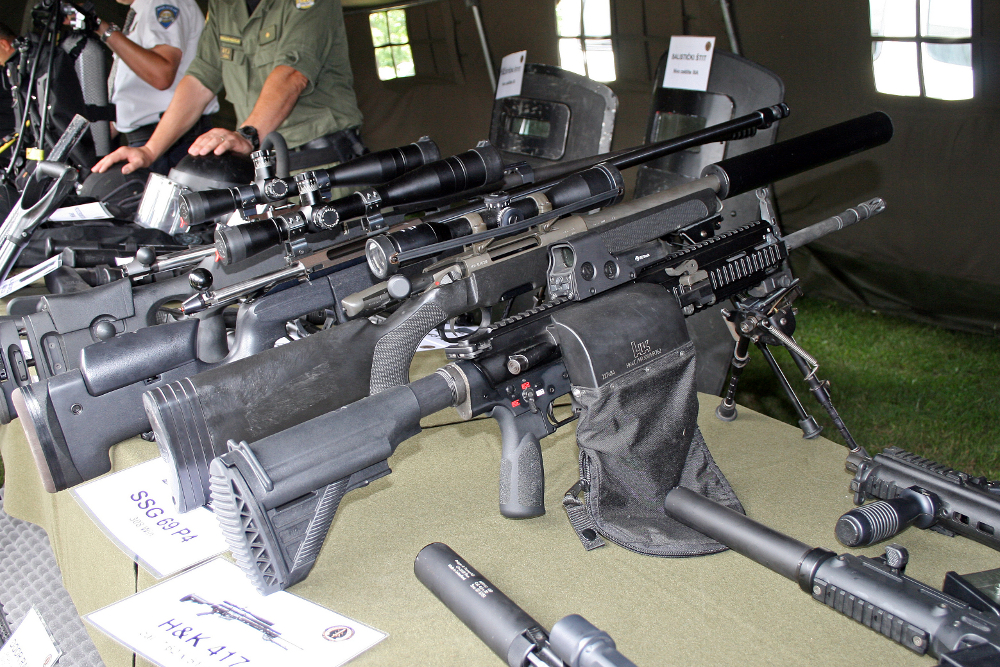
A Croatian Army HK417 12″ 'Assaulter' model on display.

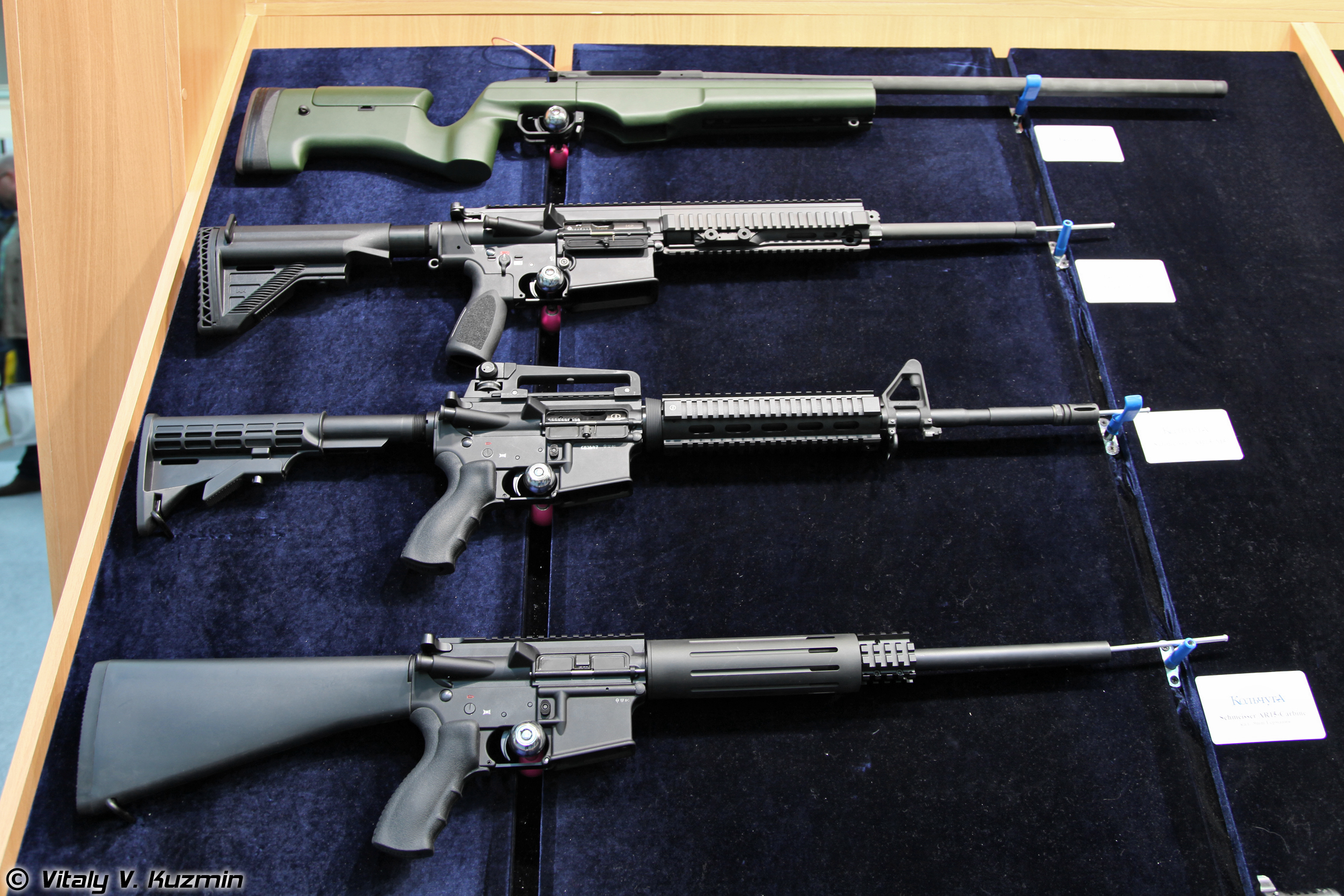
From top to bottom: a .338 Lapua Magnum Sako TRG-42, .308 Winchester MR308, .223 Remington Schmeisser GmbH AR15 M5 and a 9 mm AR-15 on display at the 2012 ARMS & Hunting exhibition.

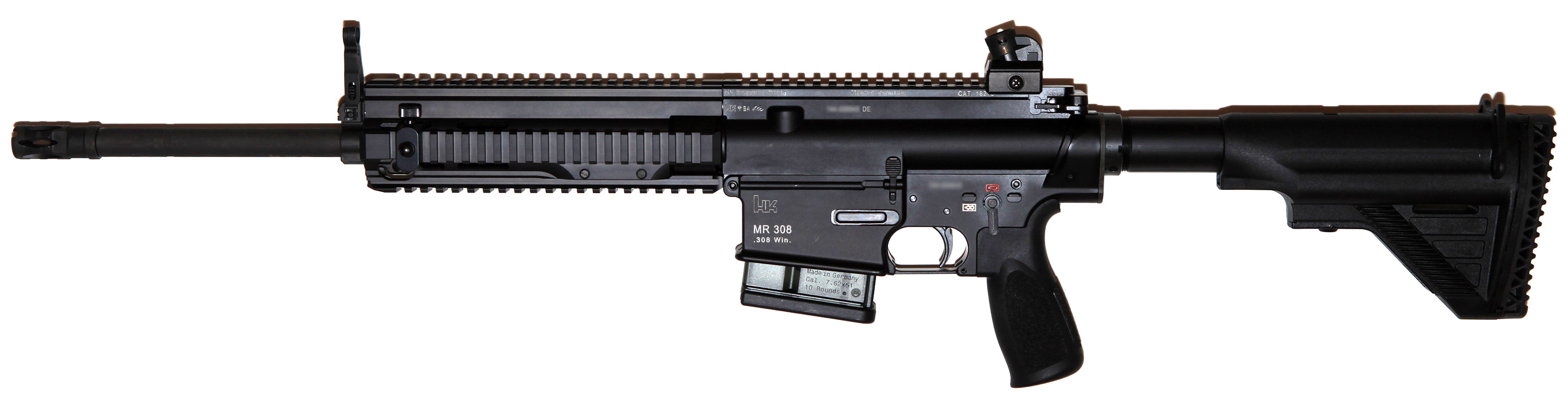
An MR308

Australian Army Pvt. Brent Rothwell patrols in Tarin Kowt with an HK417, Uruzgan province, Afghanistan, July 26, 2013.

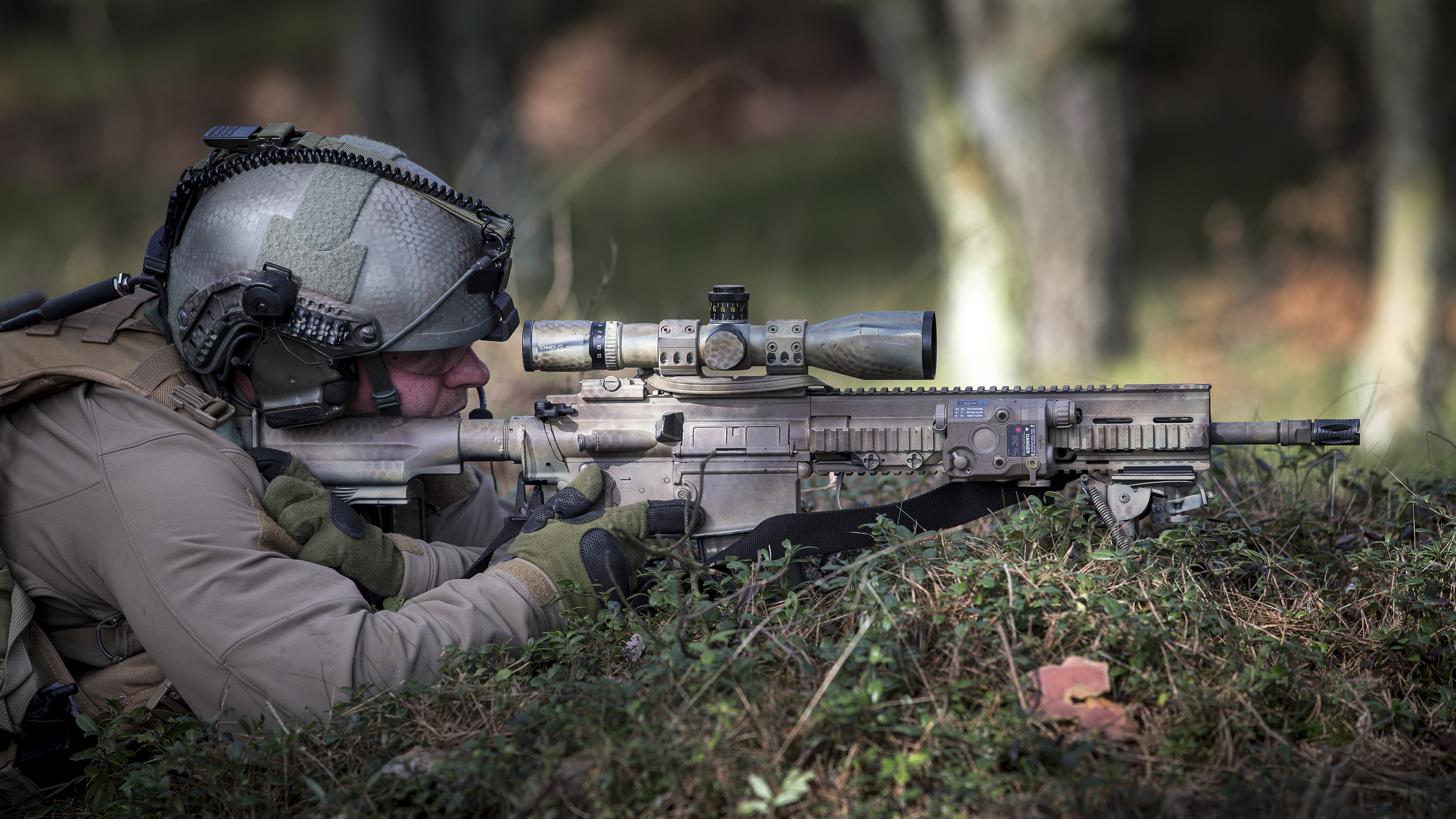
HK417 16″ 'Recce' paired with Schmidt & Bender 3–12×50 PM II used by a Netherlands Maritime Special Operations Forces (NLMARSOF) sniper.

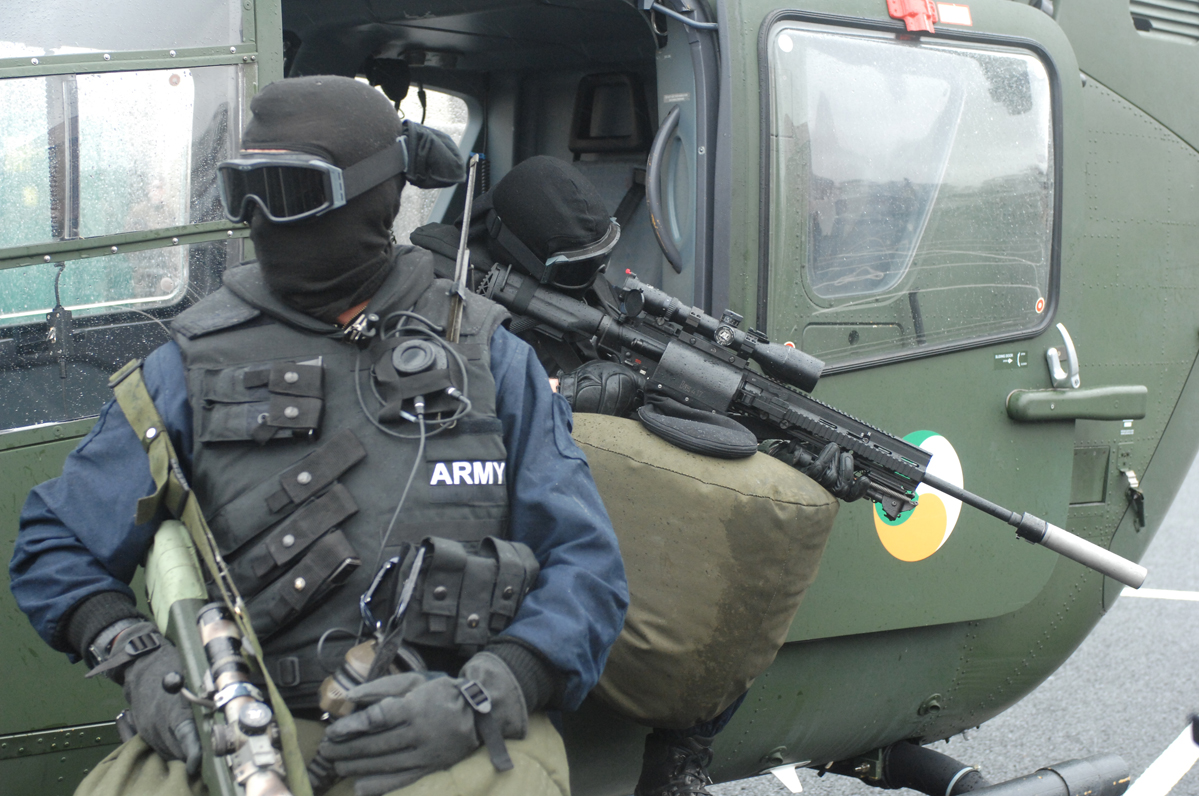
Irish Army Ranger Wing airborne sniper team on a helicopter during the 30th anniversary of the ARW.

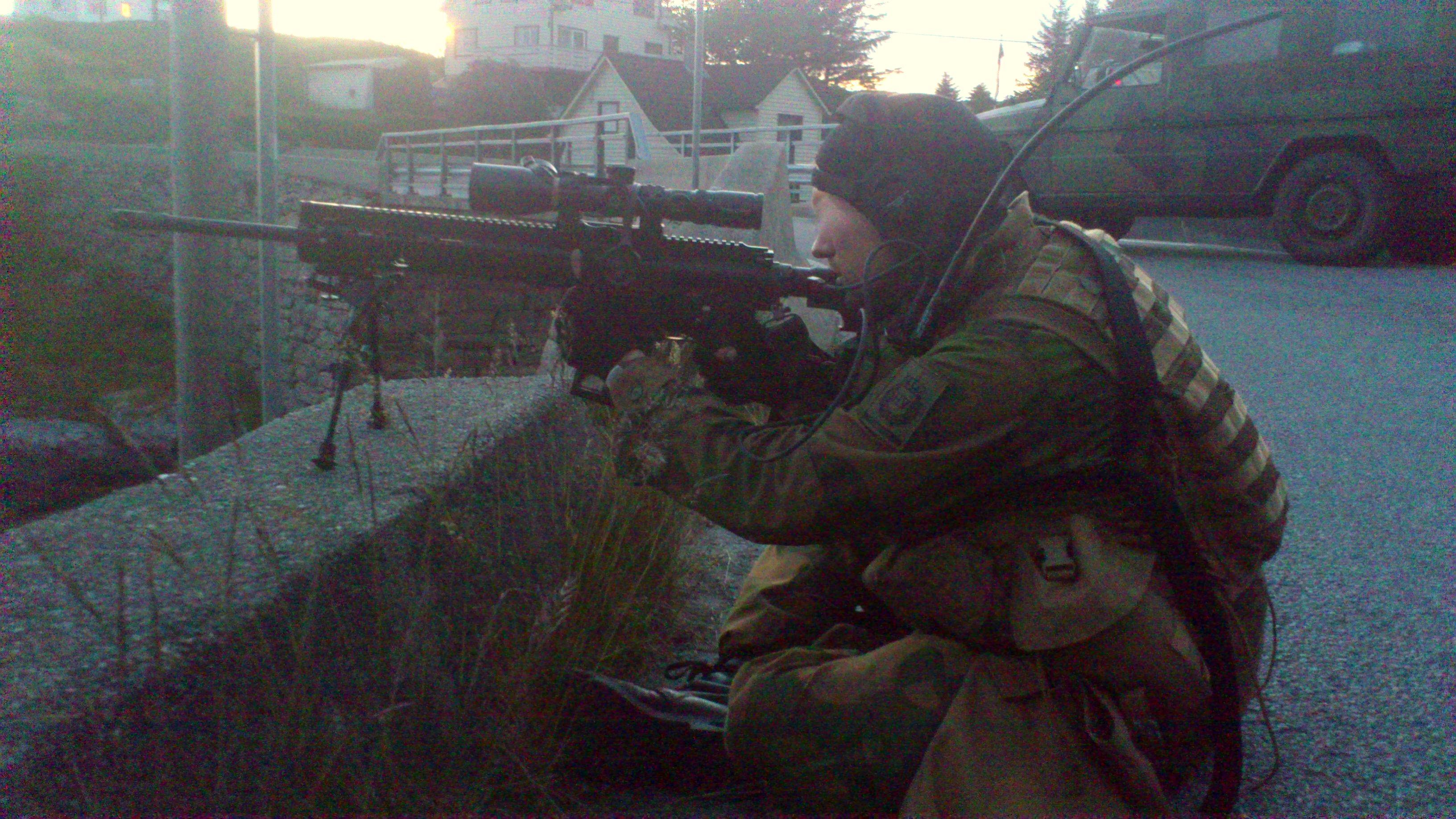
A sniper from the Norwegian Home Guard's task force "Bjørn West" armed with an HK417 designated marksman rifle.

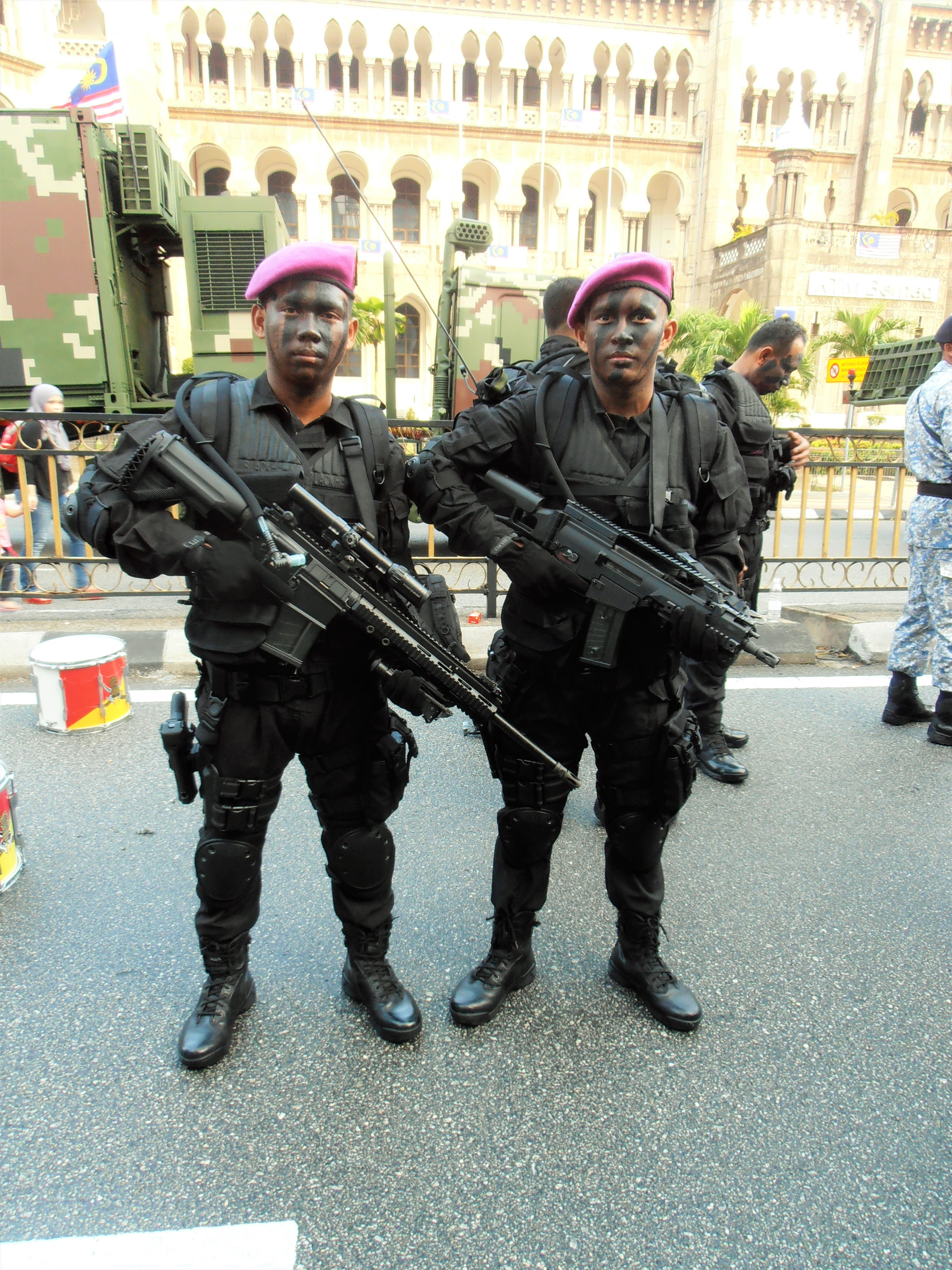
Royal Malaysian Navy PASKAL operators on standby during the 59th National Day Parade of Malaysia at Merdeka Square, Kuala Lumpur. One is armed with a 7.62mm HK417 Sniper Rifle (left), with a 8X scope attached, mounted backwards.

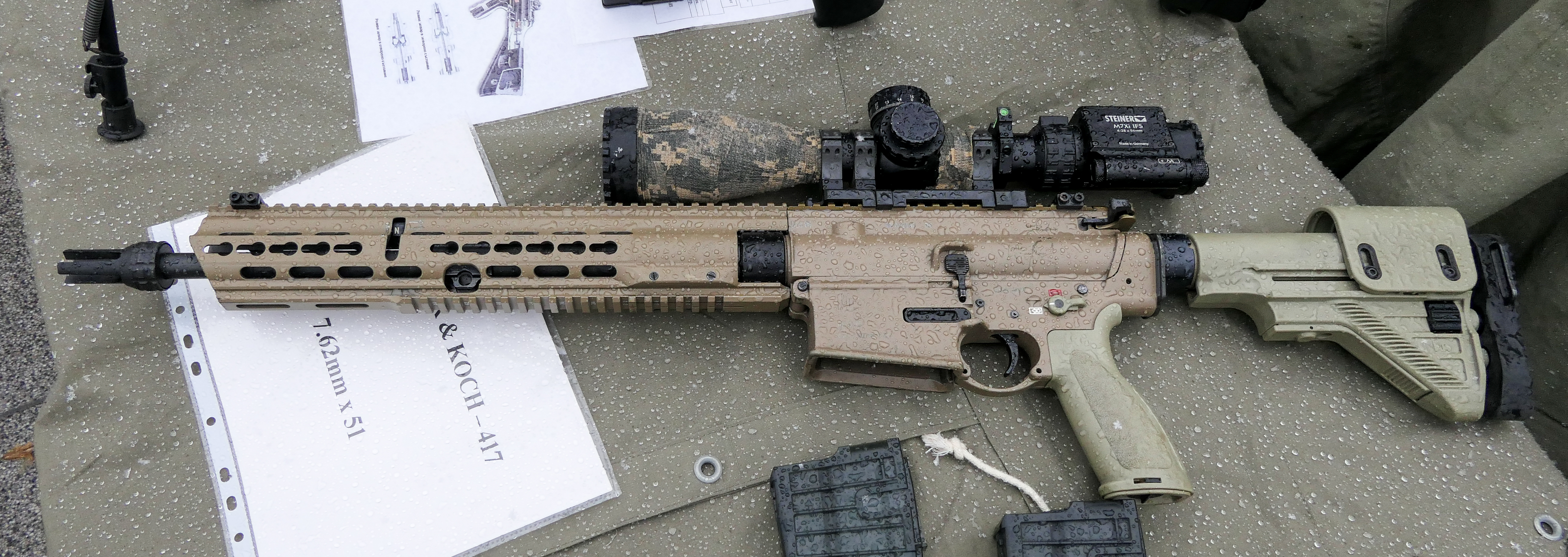
HK417 in use with the Bulgarian Joint Special Operations Command. Equipped with a Steiner M7Xi IFS

== See also ==
- Heckler & Koch HK416
