= Chukavin sniper rifle =

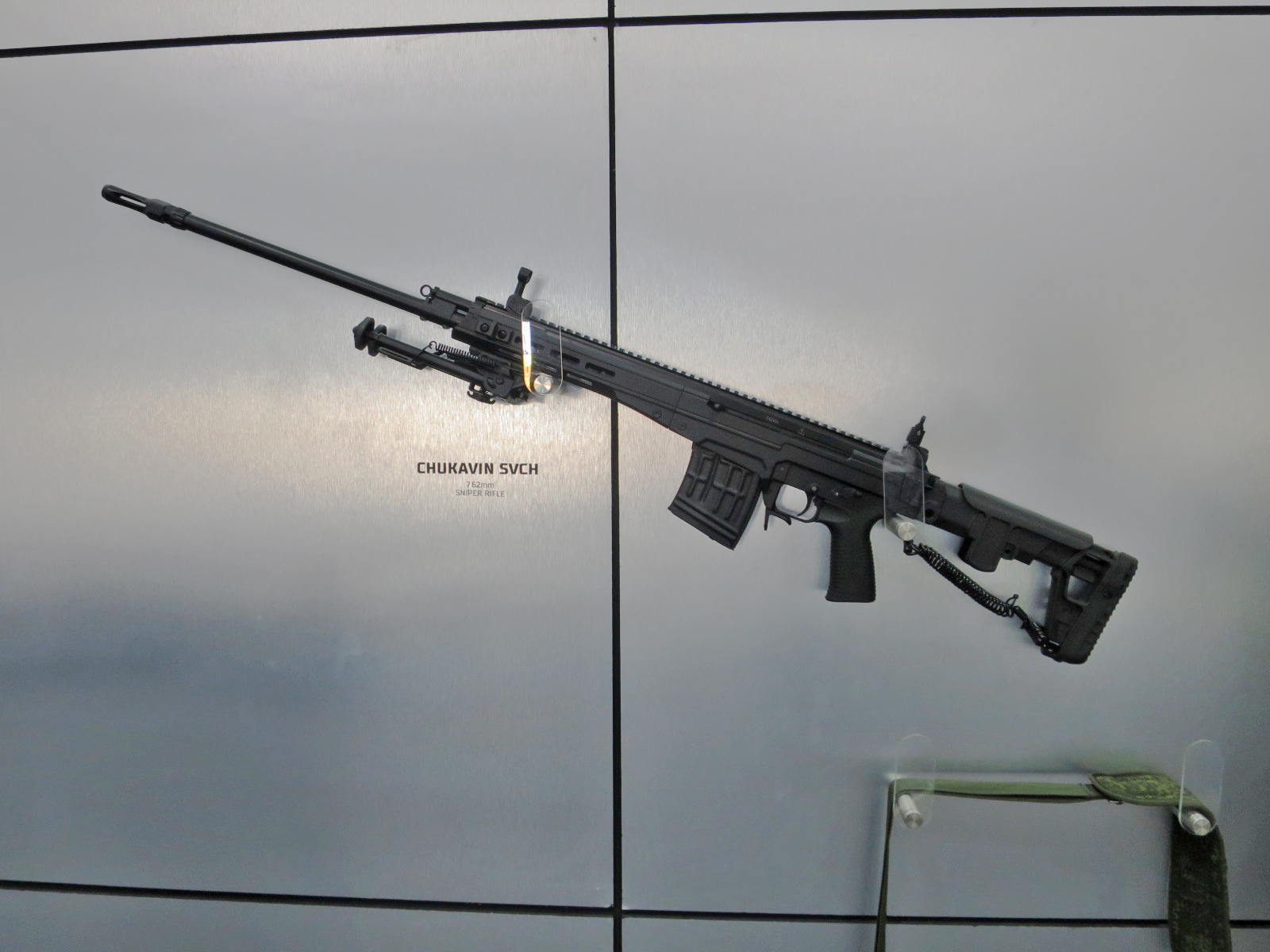
- Chukavin sniper rifle with 620 mm (24.4 in) barrel at Dubai Airshow 2023
- Type: Designated marksman rifle Sniper rifle
- Place of origin: Russian Federation

Service history
- In service: 2023-present
- Used by: Russian Armed Forces
- Wars: Russian invasion of Ukraine

Production history
- Designer: Andrey Yuryevich Chukavin
- Designed: 2017
- Manufacturer: Kalashnikov Concern
- Variants: SVCh-308; SVCh-8.6

Specifications
- Mass: 4.2–6.3 kg (9.3–13.9 lb)
- Length: 995–1,015 mm (39.2–40.0 in)
- Barrel length: 410 mm (16.1 in); 460 mm (18.1 in); 560 mm (22.0 in) (.338 LMa); 565 mm (22.2 in); 620 mm (24.4 in)
- Cartridge: 7.62×54mmR; 7.62×51mm NATO.338 Lapua Magnum (8.6×70mm)
- Action: Short-stroke piston, rotating bolt
- Rate of fire: Semi-automatic
- Effective firing range: 1,000 to 1,200 m (1,094 to 1,312 yd)
- Feed system: 10, 15 or 20-rounds detachable box magazine
- Sights: telescopic sight, night vision sights, thermal sights and iron sights

The SVCh (СВЧ; Russian: Снайперская Винтовка Чукавина, romanized: Snayperskaya Vintovka Chukavina, lit. 'Chukavin Sniper Rifle'), GRAU index 6V14, is a semi-automatic designated marksman rifle/sniper rifle chambered for fully powered cartridges developed by the Kalashnikov Concern. It is designed to replace the SVD in the Army of the Russian Federation.

== History ==
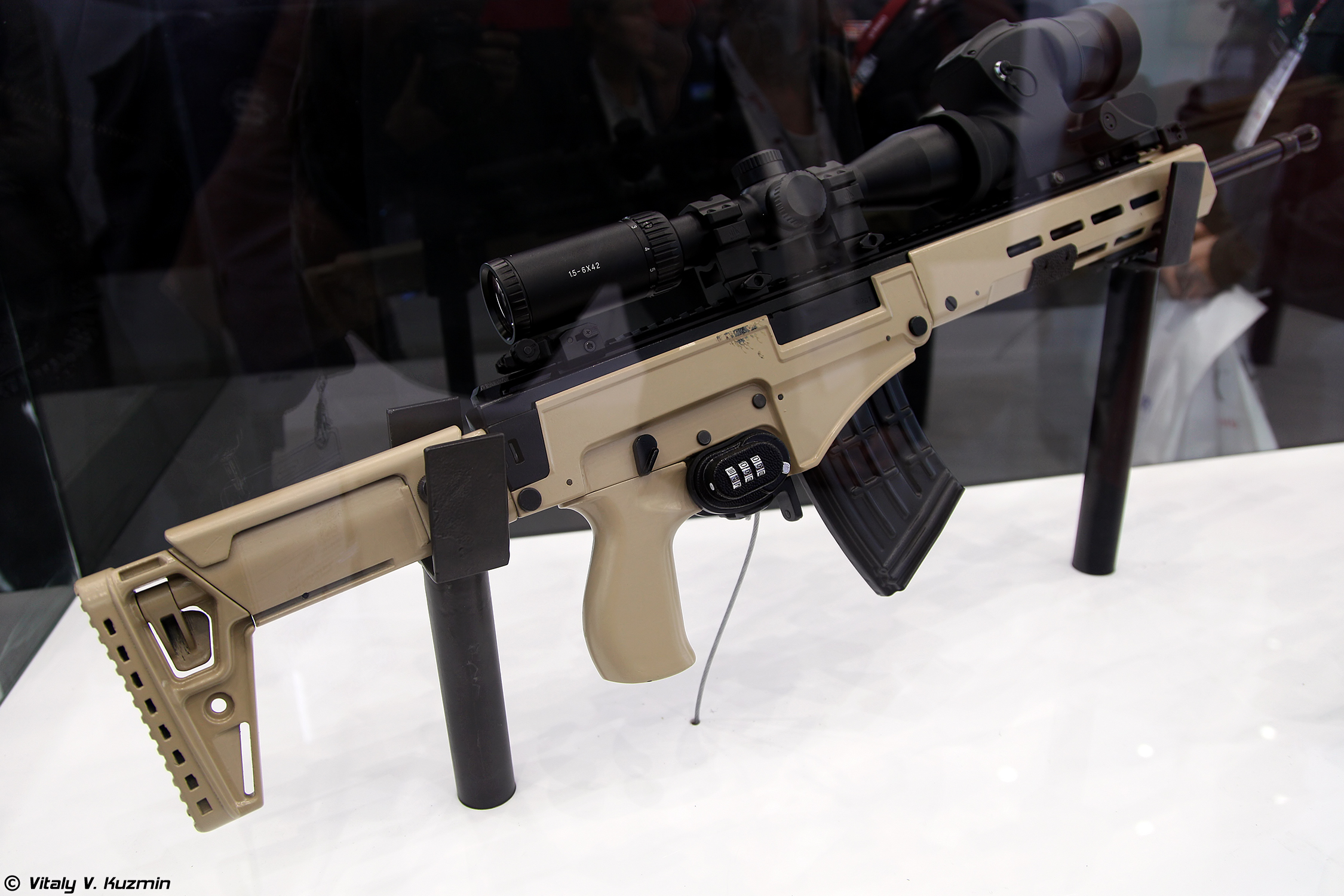
SVK-2016 rifle

The SVCh rifle was designed on the basis of the SVK-2016 rifle. It was first presented in 2017 at the military-technical forum “Army-2017”.

Russian tests of the Chukavin rifle have been completed in the fall 2021 and the rifle was recommended for adoption. The first deliveries were conducted in September 2022. Long-term contracts have been signed. In November 2022, a decision was made to begin purchasing rifles for the needs of the Russian army. The contract for the first batch was signed by the Ministry of Defence. In February 2023, it was reported that mass-production began by Kalashnikov Concern. The qualification trials were completed on October 6, 2023. Some rifles were supplied in December 2023. Kalashnikov Concern announced they will ramp up the production in 2024 and completed the relevant contract in November 2024. It was adopted by the Russian Interior Ministry in March 2026.

According to reports, the Chukavin rifle chambered for 7.62×54mmR is used since 2022 on a limited scale during the Russian invasion of Ukraine.

== Design details ==
The rifle is designed to be used in the same roles — engage (valuable) personnel and assets at short and medium ranges beyond the effective range provided by intermediate cartridge arms in combined arms combat — as the 1960s SVD with the benefits of being more compact, modular and built with 21st century materials and technologies. Relatively small dimensions allow the user to do without a secondary weapon for close combat, which increases mobility.

The developers of this weapon reported that the rifle was designed according to the so-called “curtain scheme”: its internal mechanisms are conventionally divided into "upper" and "lower" parts. The main structural element is an inverted U-profiled upper receiver part made of durable metal, that is used as a chassis and takes on the entire mechanical stress load during shooting. The also highly stressed action or bolt group and hammer-forged free-floating barrel are mounted in the upper receiver chassis. The operating system comprises a short stroke gas piston and a three-position rotary gas regulator. This allows to make the lower parts as light as possible since they will not be subject to high stresses. The lower elements are installed in or on the upper receiver chassis and can be made of lightweight polymer materials. The “curtain scheme” design concept was pioneered by Yevgeny Dragunov in an experimental compact assault rifle with extensive use of polymer called Dragunov MA prototype back in the late 1970s, that later resulted in the AM-17/AMB-17. It differs significantly from Dragunov's SVD or the Kalashnikov rifle layout, where the main structural elements are installed on the lower part, which limits designers in the use of lightweight materials.

The rifle features a telescopic and folding butt stock for adjustable length of pull with an integrated adjustable cheek riser. Rail integration systems allow the installation of accessories like iron, day or low light optical or thermal sights on the MIL-STD/1913 Picatinny rail along the entire length of the upper receiver chassis. The bottom of the hand guard al LR6/o features a Picatinny rail for attaching accessories like bipods, and the sides of the hand guard feature "negative space" (hollow slot) attachment points for mounting further accessories. The 7.62×54mmR chambered SVCh rifle variant is compatible with the 10-round box magazines from the SVD, and also uses proprietary box magazines in the other available chambering variants. Extended capacity magazines are available, for 15- and 20-rounds.

Series production of the new 1P97 3–15× variable power day telescopic sight developed by the Novosibirsk Instrument-Making Plant and featuring a Horus H59-style reticle for the SVCh started in February 2024. Electric power is provided by a LR6/AA battery.

== Variants ==
- SVCh-308 variant chambered for the 7.62×51mm NATO cartridge.
- SVCh-8.6 variant chambered for the .338 Lapua Magnum (8.6×70mm). The upper receiver is enlarged and combined with a 560 mm (22.0 in) barrel and a different muzzle brake. The bolt group of this model is also modified to accommodate the dimensionally significantly larger cartridge. The total weight and length of this .338 Lapua Magnum variant are 6.3 kg (14 lb) and 1,015 mm (40.0 in). The effective firing range is estimated at 1,500 m (1,640 yd).
- MR1 limited edition civilian variant for the Russian market chambered for the 7.62×54mmR or .308 Winchester cartridge and using aluminum in its lower parts and hand guards featuring M-LOK "negative space" (hollow slot) mounting points. The 7.62×54mmR MR1 version is fed from SVD magazines, has a 530 mm (20.9 in) barrel and is offered with a folding stock similar to the one seen on SVCh rifles. The .308 Winchester MR1 version is offered with two barrel length options, 530 mm (20.9 in) and 410 mm (16.1 in), and features fixed or folding adjustable skeletonized stocks.
