= M110A1 rifle =

Designated marksman rifle chambered for 7.62×51mm

M110A1 Compact Semi-Automatic Sniper System
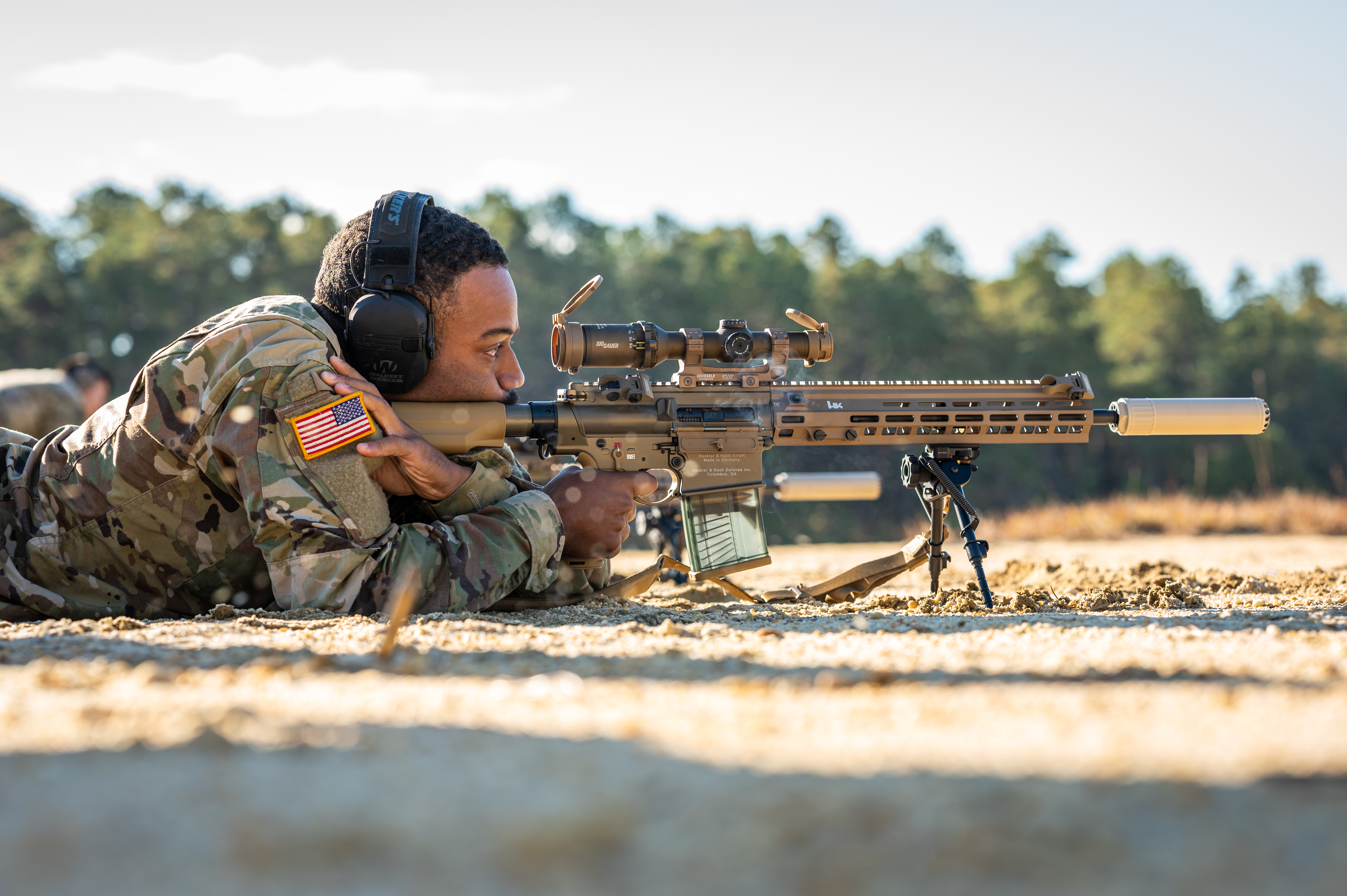
- The M110A1 Squad Designated Marksman Rifle
- Type: Sniper rifle

Service history
- In service: 2016–present

Production history
- Designed: 2016
- Manufacturer: Heckler & Koch
- Variants: M110A1 CSASS; M110A1 SDMR

Specifications
- Mass: 3.81 kg (8.40 lb) unloaded M110A1 CSASS; 6.80 kg (14.99 lb) loaded M110A1 CSASS, scope, suppressor; 4.15 kg (9.15 lb) unloaded M110A1 SDMR; 6.35 kg (14.00 lb) loaded M110A1 SDMR, scope, suppressor
- Length: 899 mm (35.39 in) (M110A1 CSASS buttstock fully collapsed); 1,009 mm (39.72 in) (M110A1 CSASS buttstock fully extended); 1,019 mm (40.12 in) (M110A1 SDMR with suppressor)
- Barrel length: 414 mm (16.30 in)
- Cartridge: 7.62×51mm NATO
- Action: Gas-operated short-stroke piston, rotating bolt
- Rate of fire: Semi-automatic
- Muzzle velocity: 750 m/s (2,461 ft/s) with 175 gr. M118LR
- Effective firing range: 800 metres (875 yd) (point targets)
- Feed system: 10 or 20-round detachable box magazine

M110A1 may refer to the M110A1 CSASS (Compact Semi Automatic Sniper System) or the M110A1 SDMR (Squad Designated Marksman Rifle). It is an American semi-automatic designated marksman rifle that is chambered for the 7.62×51mm NATO round. It is manufactured by Heckler & Koch (H&K) and developed from the company's HK417, and similar to the Bundeswehr G28 configuration. Despite a designation similar to the M110 Semi-Automatic Sniper System (M110 SASS), the M110A1 is an unrelated design as the former was a development of the Knight's Armament Company SR-25. The M110A1 CSASS was expected to supplant and eventually replace the M110 in U.S. military service but this does not appear to have occurred as of 2022. However, several thousand M110A1 SDMRs have been fielded with the US Army and Air Force to replace various weapon systems currently being used.

== History ==
In July 2012, the U.S. Army requested sources to remanufacture the current M110 rifle into the Compact Semi-Automatic Sniper System (CSASS). The CSASS would be a shorter and lighter version of the M110 with a collapsible stock and removable flash suppressor, giving it an overall length of 36 inches (910 mm) and a weight of 9 pounds (4.1 kg) unloaded. The Army wanted the capability to convert 125 rifles per month, with the ability to increase to 325 per month. The Army formally requested proposals for the CSASS in June 2014.

On 1 April 2016, the Army announced it had awarded Heckler and Koch a contract with a maximum value of $44.5 million to replace the KAC M110. The weapon selected was not initially specified, but was likely the H&K G28; H&K was to produce 3,643 rifles. A goal of the effort was to give snipers a weapon that didn't "stick out" as a sniper rifle; with a suppressor, the M110 is 46.5 in (1,180 mm), 13 in (330 mm) longer than the M4 carbine and 7 in (180 mm) longer than the M16A4 rifle. A minimum of 30 CSASS units will be used for production qualification testing and operational testing over 24 months. H&K later confirmed that a modified G28 had indeed been selected as the CSASS rifle. The G28 is nearly 6 cm (2.5 in) shorter and 1.3 kg (3 lb) lighter than the M110 (unloaded and without a suppressor) and will cost about $12,000 per rifle. Interestingly, the new CSASS was to be designated the M110A1 CSASS, continuing to use the earlier KAC M110's designation number. This was likely to avoid needing to start a new Program of Record. In May 2018, the U.S. Marine Corps planned to begin receiving the CSASS to replace their M110 rifles.

However, as of September 2017, no CSASS rifles had been fielded because no funding had been allotted for their procurement. Shortly after, an ECP (engineering change proposal) was announced which was speculated to be a sign of conversion of the CSASS to a squad designated marksman rifle configuration. Since 2017, there have been several small tests of the CSASS with soldiers, including jump testing, but no known fielding of the rifle.

The SDMR configuration was planned to give extended range capabilities to infantry squads so they could engage threats at distances of 300-600m. The Army conducted some Limited User Evaluation of the M110A1 SDMR in early 2018 and announced that the SDMR would soon be fielded as the standard DMR starting in September 2018 and would replace the Mk 14 EBR currently in service. The optic to be used with the SDMR was revealed shortly afterward as the SIG Sauer Tango6 1-6×24mm. For a time, the SDMR version was given the designation M110E1 while it was being evaluated by PEO Soldier. The SDMR was given its official designation as M110A1 Squad Designated Marksman Rifle which, confusingly, uses the same type designation as the M110A1 CSASS. This was reinforced by release of its official TM (technical manual) in May 2022 which also identified the rifle as the M110A1 SDMR.

Fielding of the nearly 6,000 M110A1 SDMRs to various Army units, including the National Guard, effectively began in 2020 and continued into 2022; fielding is expected to be complete by 2023. To support this, in spring 2020 H&K was granted an increase of $33.5 million to their contract's original $44.5 million maximum. In April 2022, the Air Force also announced it would soon complete fielding of the 1,464 M110A1 SDMRs it had procured. These SDMRs would be distributed to PJs, EOD techs, and Security Forces. They would replace the Security Forces' existing M24 SWS and the M110 SASS used by PJs and EOD.

The status of the M110A1 CSASS, as of 2022, is uncertain. A little more than $57 million of the contract's combined $78 million has been spent and there is no further spending indicated for FY2022 onward. The Army, instead, revised a $13 million contract with Knight's Armament Company to allow for procurement of the M110A2 as well as the standard M110 SASS. The M110A2 is an improved version of the M110 which features an improved gas system, new suppressor, adjustable stock, and M-LOK rails. Meanwhile, the Navy and Marine Corps, which had expressed interest in the CSASS, decided to instead pursue an M110 SASS PIP (Product Improvement Program) for FY2021 based on market research which indicated improved range and lethality with the PIP compared to the M110A1 CSASS without any increase in cost. Budget figures for FY2023 show funding set aside for the M110 SASS PIP to upgrade the Marine Corps' existing M110s.

== Design ==
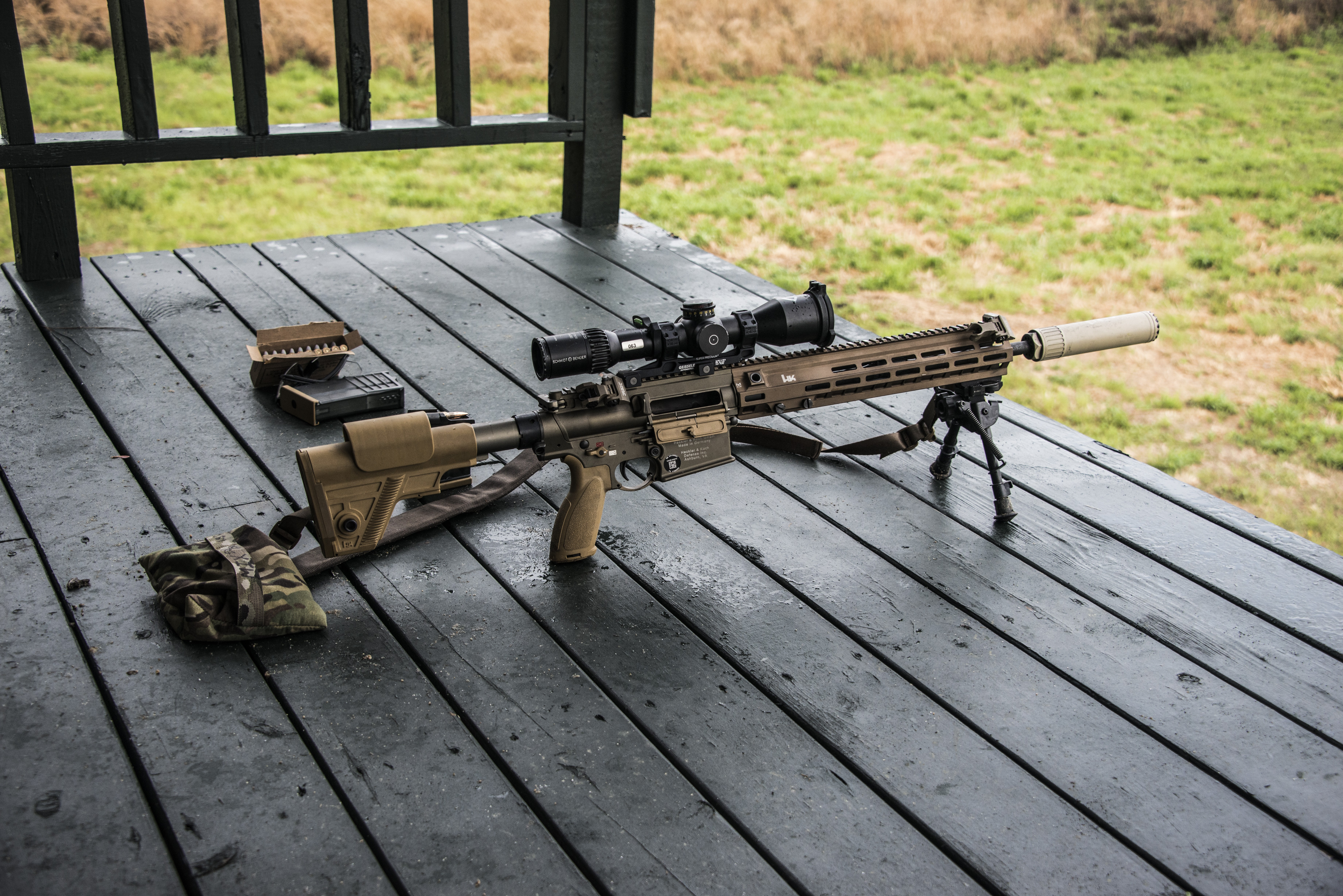
M110A1 CSASS configuration

The M110A1 CSASS and SDMR are variants of the HK417; the HK417 is a gas piston variant of the AR-10 platform, with the short-stroke gas piston derived from the H&K G36. Compared to the G28, the M110A1 uses an aluminum upper receiver instead of steel to meet weight requirements, weighing 8.4 lb (3.8 kg) unloaded and reaching some 15 lb (6.8 kg) when loaded with accessories.

It is capable of using the 7.62mm M80A1 as well as the newer M1158 advanced armor piercing rounds which can penetrate modern body armor the 5.56mm M855A1 cannot. The M110A1 features a Geissele M-LOK rail handguard, Geissele adjustable two-stage trigger, Geissele optic mount, OSS SRM6 suppressor, and 6-9 Harris bipod and mount.

The M110A1 SDMR is differentiated from the CSASS by the selected optic and the buttstock type. The SDMR variant is fitted with a SIG Sauer TANGO6 1–6x24 low-power variable optic, while the CSASS variant is fitted with a Schmidt & Bender 3–20×50 PM II Ultra Short telescopic sight.

== Users ==
- United States: US Army, US Marine Corps, and US Air Force.

== See also ==
- M110 Semi-Automatic Sniper System
- Heckler & Koch HK417
