= M110 Semi-Automatic Sniper System =

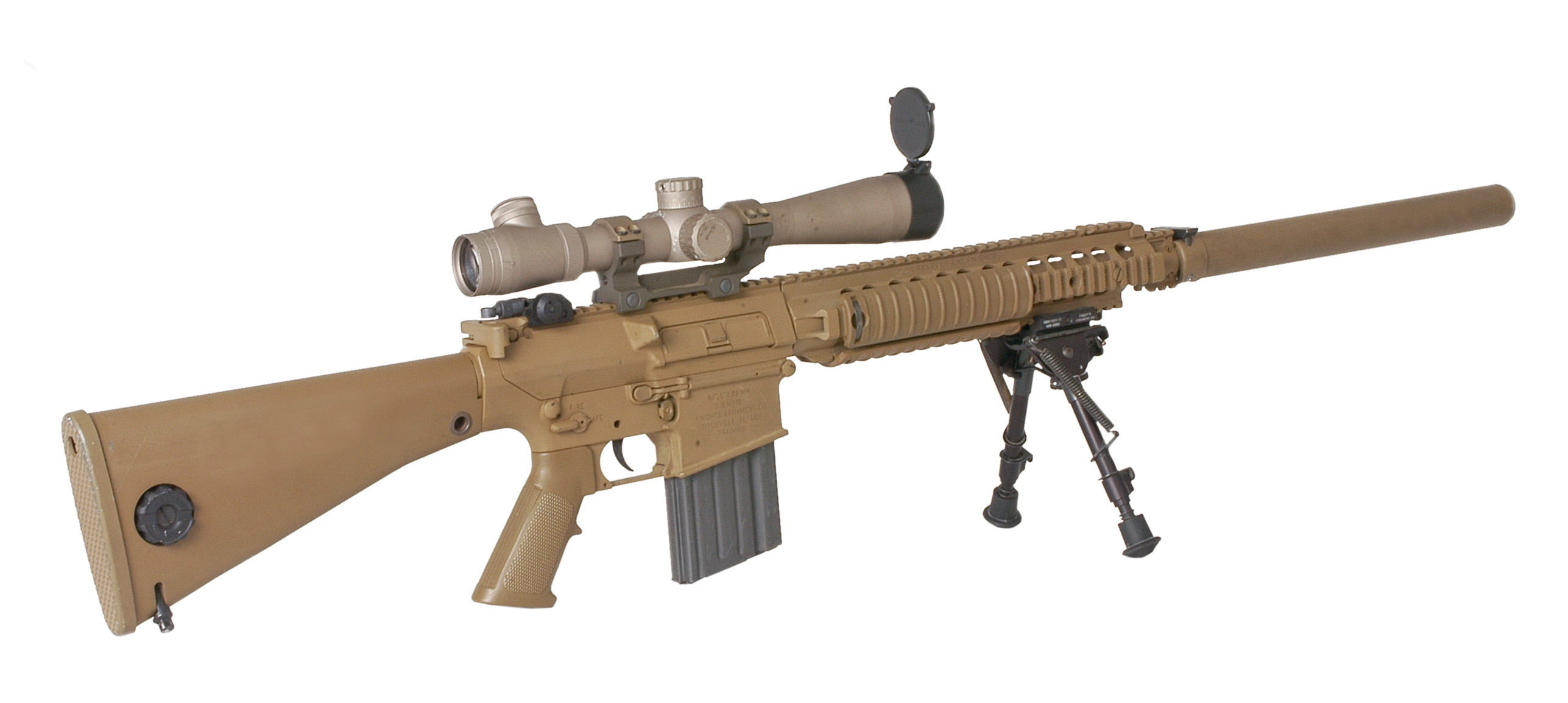
- The M110 Semi-Automatic Sniper System
- Type: Sniper rifle
- Place of origin: United States

Service history
- In service: 2008–present
- Wars: War in Afghanistan (2001–2021); Iraq War; Kurdish–Turkish conflict (2015–present); Militias-Comando Vermelho conflict Syrian Civil War; War in Iraq (2013–2017); Russo-Ukrainian war 2025 Cambodia–Thailand clashes

Production history
- Designed: 2007
- Manufacturer: Knight's Armament Company
- Variants: M110 SASS; M110A2; M110A3

Specifications
- Mass: 6.27 kg (13.8 lb) unloaded M110; 4.76 kg (10.5 lb) unloaded M110A2
- Length: 1,029–1,181 mm (40.51–46.50 in) M110: buttstock fully retracted without and with suppressor; 1,009.65–1,104.9 mm (39.75–43.50 in) M110A2: buttstock fully retracted to fully extended (presumably without suppressor)
- Barrel length: 508 mm (20.0 in) barrel
- Cartridge: 7.62×51mm NATO; 6.5mm Creedmoor
- Action: Gas-operated, closed rotating bolt, Stoner bolt and carrier piston
- Rate of fire: Semi-automatic
- Muzzle velocity: 783 m/s (2,570 ft/s) with 175 gr. M118LR
- Effective firing range: 800 metres (875 yd) (point targets)
- Feed system: 10 or 20-round detachable SR-25 pattern box magazine

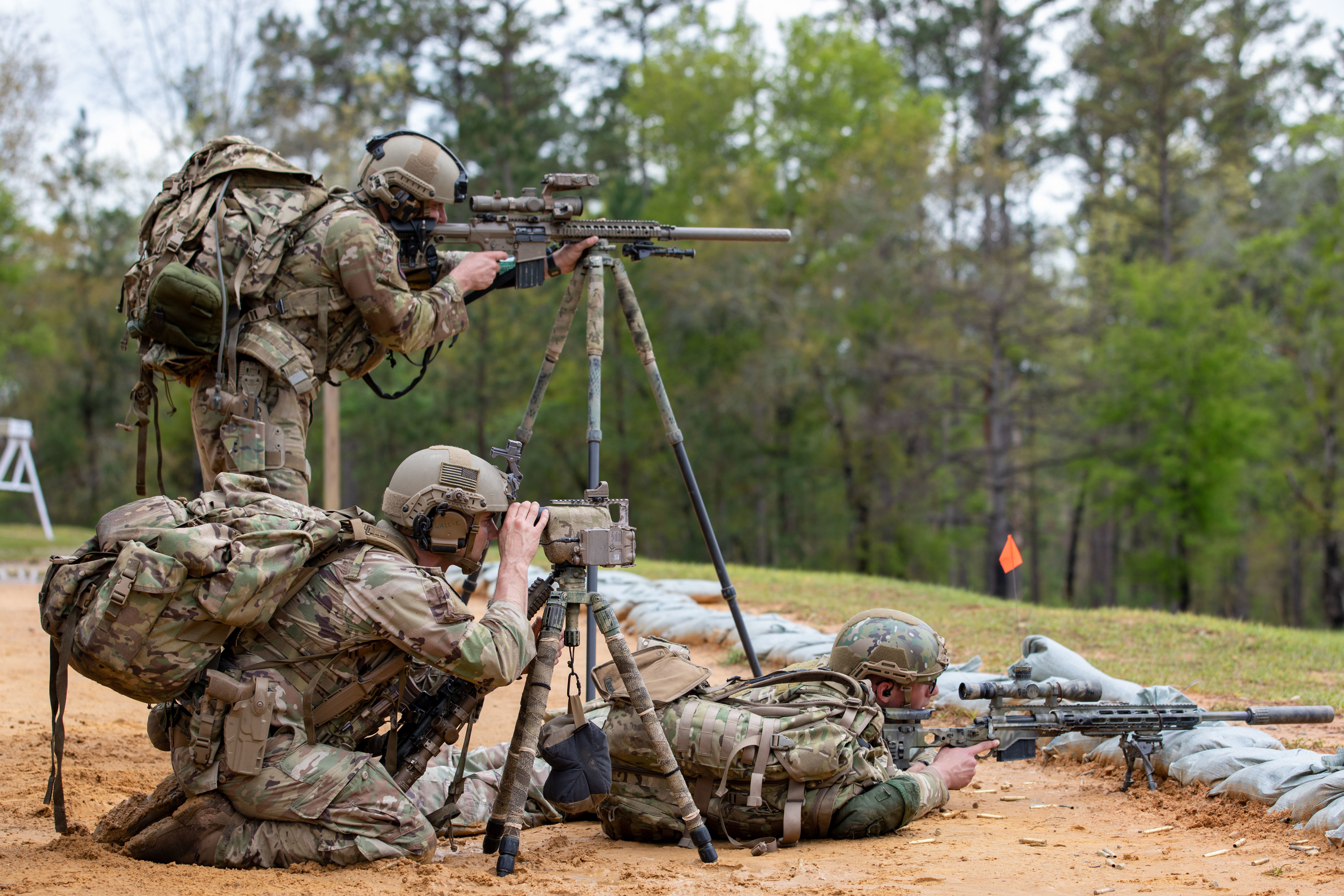
US Army 10th Mountain Division sniper with an M110 SASS

The M110 Semi Automatic Sniper System (M110 SASS) is an American semi-automatic sniper rifle that is chambered for the 7.62×51mm NATO round. It is manufactured by Knight's Armament Company, developed from the Knight's Armament Company SR-25, and adopted by the U.S. military following the 2005 US Army Semi-Automatic Sniper Rifle (XM110 SASR) competition.

The M110 is to be replaced by the lighter and more compact M110A1 CSASS, which is developed from the G28, a variant of the Heckler & Koch HK417; however, most M110A1 models fielded have been of the SDMR variant. In 2021, a newer variant, the M110A2, was showcased and seen in use in early 2022.

== History ==
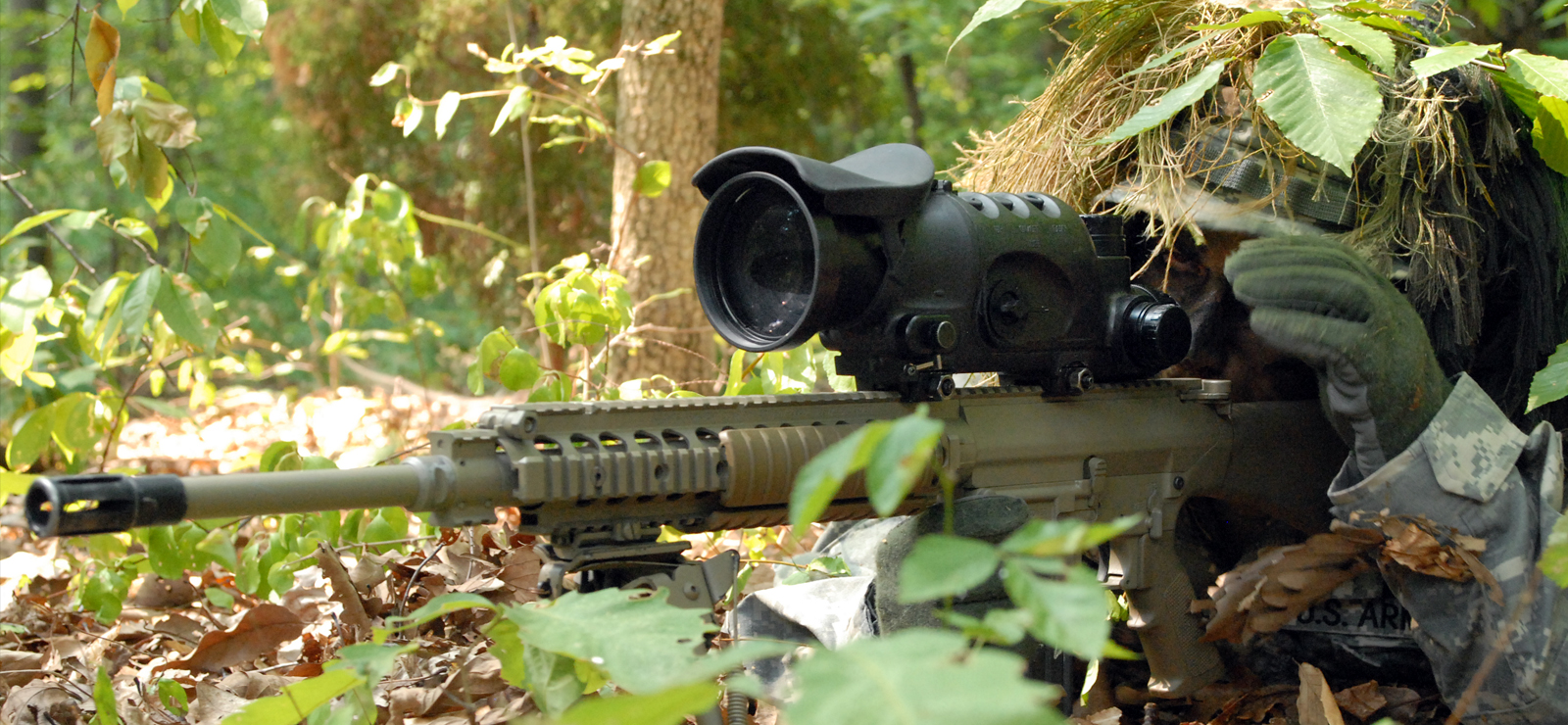
The M110 SASS with AN/PVS-10 Sniper Night Sight.

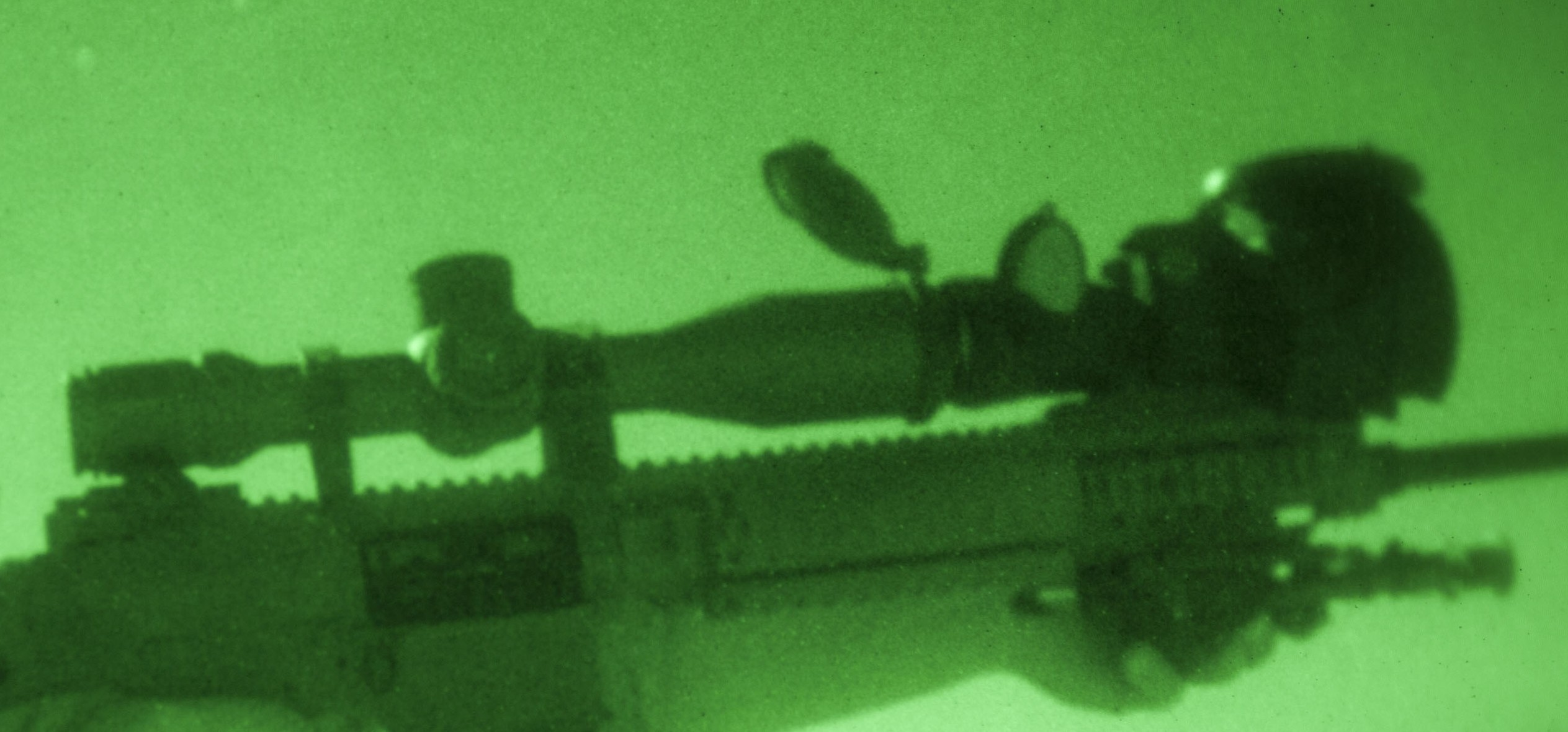
A standard telescopic sight augmented with a night-vision device in front on the M110. Note that in addition to the image intensifier, the NVD gathers much more light by its much larger aperture

The M110 Semi-Automatic Sniper System is intended to replace the M24 Sniper Weapon System used by snipers, spotters, designated marksmen, or squad advanced marksmen in the United States Army. However, the U.S. Army still acquired M24s from Remington until February 2010. On September 28, 2005, the Knight's Armament Co. rifle won the competition and was selected to be the supplier of the M110 Semi-Automatic Sniper System.

The XM110 underwent final operational testing in May and June 2007 at Fort Drum, New York by a mix of Special Forces troops and Sniper trained soldiers from the 10th Mountain Division. In April 2008, U.S. Army soldiers from Task Force Fury in Afghanistan were the first in a combat zone to receive the M110. The troops rated the weapon very highly, noting the quality of the weapon and its semi-automatic capabilities compared to the bolt-action M24. The United States Marine Corps will also be adopting the M110 to replace some M39 and all Mk 11 as a complement to the M40A5.

The rifle has ambidextrous features such as a double-sided magazine release, safety selector switch, and bolt catch.

== Design and features ==
The rifle is similar to the SR-25/Mk 11 Mod 0, but differs significantly in buttstock and rail system design. The SR-25, Mk 11 Mod 0, and M110 are based loosely on the original AR-10 developed by Eugene Stoner but feature additional refinements instituted by KAC to maximize parts commonality with the AR-15 design, improve weapon reliability, and increase accuracy.

The main differences between the Mk 11 and M110 are improvements suggested by a user group meeting between NAVSPECWAR, USASOC and USA in 2007:

- The rail system used: the KAC Free Floated RAS on the Mk 11 is replaced by a URX modular rail system with integral folding front 600-meter backup iron sight.
- The M110 buttstock: fixed, though the buttplate is adjustable for length of pull to match user preferences. Adjustment can be made without tools via a notched hand-tightened knob on the right-hand side of the stock. This feature was added during the change from XM110 to M110. The fixed buttstock also features integral quick-detachable sling swivel sockets located on each side of the stock near the rear of the lower receiver.
- The addition of a flash hider to the barrel of the M110, which also necessitates a modified QD Suppressor unit similar to that on the Mk 11.
- The M110's use of KAC's one-piece 30 mm scope mount instead of two separate scope rings.

On June 12, 2008, the M110 was ranked #2 on the U.S. Army's top ten inventions of 2007. According to performance specification (MIL-PRF-32316 (AR) w/AMENDMENT 1, 5 October 2009):

3.4.1.1.1 Accuracy. The distance between the mean point of impact of each shot group, both unsuppressed and suppressed, shall not be greater than 1.1 inches at 300 feet.

3.4.1.1.2 Dispersion. The average mean radius (AMR) (see 6.11), of each shot group shall be not greater than to 0.68 inches at 300 feet. All targets shall be fired on using M118LR ammunition or equivalent, using five (5) round groups.

== Sporting use ==
In 2009, the M110 rifle and commercial equivalents were added to the list of NRA-legal US service rifles under rule 3.1.6 of the NRA High Power Rifle Rules.

== Replacement or reconfiguration of M110 ==
In April 2011, according to Military.com, the U.S. Army issued a request to the private sector to reconfigure or replace the current Knight Armament M110 sniper rifle, alleging that the current version of the M110 was not functioning well in the field and, according to industry officials and users in the field, required significant maintenance and replacement of parts. The U.S. Army responded directly, claiming that the rifle was functioning perfectly, citing a 100% approval rating from the 173rd Airborne Brigade, and they were simply looking for a smaller, lighter version of M110 for the spotter in a sniper team.

The specifications the U.S. Army has issued are as follows:

1. Operation: Semi-automatic
2. Caliber: Compatible with 7.62×51mm NATO cartridges
3. Accuracy: Capable of 1.3 minute of angle dispersion or better with match ammunition
4. Size: Overall length shall be reduced using a shorter barrel and/or collapsible buttstock. Maximum length not to exceed 39 inches (990 mm) without suppressor. Desired minimum length is less than 36 inches (910 mm) with stock collapsed.
5. Weight: Weight shall be under 9.0 lb for unloaded rifle without optics and accessories
6. Grip: A modular, adjustable pistol grip.
7. Trigger: A non-adjustable match style trigger.
8. Hand guard: A forend that includes a fixed 12 o’ clock rail with configurable 3, 6, and 9 o’ clock rails.
9. Sound suppressor: A muzzle mounted, detachable sound suppressor.
10. Muzzle device: A compensator/muzzle brake compatible with the sound suppressor.
11. Bipod: Tool-less detachment featuring cant and pan/track capability.
12. Day optic: An Army specified variable power day optic and compatible rings.
13. Back up sights: Iron sights offset 45 deg from the DOS.
14. Sling attachment: Flush cup, quick detach sling attachment points.
15. Other: The upgraded M110 must meet the operational and environmental requirements that were fulfilled by the original M110 SASS.

=== M110A1 replacement ===
In July 2012, the U.S. Army requested sources to remanufacture the current M110 rifle into the Compact Semi-Automatic Sniper System (CSASS). The CSASS will be a shorter and lighter version of the M110 with a collapsible stock and removable flash suppressor, giving it an overall length of 36 inches (910 mm) and a weight of 9 pounds (4.1 kg) unloaded. The Army wants a capability to convert 125 rifles per month, with the ability to increase to 325 per month. The Army formally requested proposals for the CSASS in June 2014.

On 1 April 2016, the Army announced it had awarded Heckler and Koch a contract with a maximum value of $44.5 million as winner of the competition to replace the KAC M110. The weapon selected was not specified, but was likely the H&K G28; H&K is to produce 3,643 rifles. A goal of the effort was to give snipers a weapon that didn't "stick out" as a sniper rifle; with a suppressor, the M110 is 46.5 in (1,180 mm), 13 in (330 mm) longer than the M4 carbine and 7 in (180 mm) longer than the M16A4 rifle. A minimum of 30 CSASS units will be used for production qualification testing and operational testing over 24 months.

H&K later confirmed that a modified G28 had indeed been selected as the CSASS rifle. The G28 is nearly 6 cm (2.5 in) shorter and 1.3 kg (3 lb) lighter than the M110 (unloaded and without a suppressor) and will cost about $12,000 per rifle. The U.S. Marine Corps was slated to begin receiving the CSASS in May 2018 to replace their M110 rifles. However, as of 2022, all of the M110A1 units delivered were configured as squad designated marksman rifles (SDMR) rather than M110A1 CSASS rifles.

=== M110A2 ===
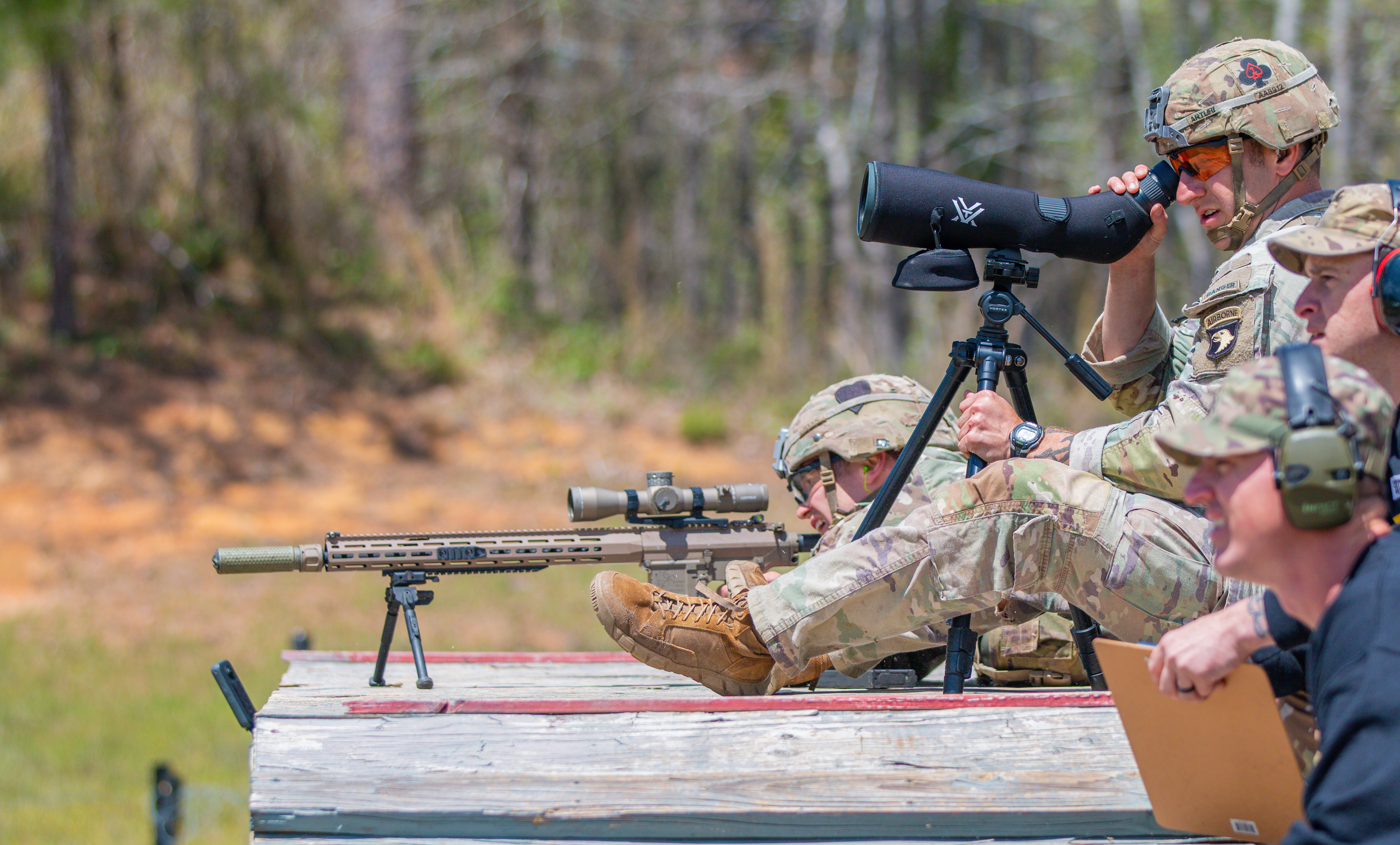
An M110A2 seen at the 2022 Best Ranger Competition

The M110A2 is an improved version of the original M110 rifle with M-LOK rails, an improved gas system, new suppressor, and adjustable stock. This fills the gap of semi-automatic sniper rifles as most all of the M110A1 rifles issued were the SDMR variant and not designed for sniper work. The M110A2 was first seen at AUSA 2021 where it was displayed alongside a 14.5" SOCOM M110 rechambered for 6.5 Creedmoor. The M110A2 was later seen at the 2022 Best Ranger Competition being used by a Ranger-qualified 101st Airborne Division soldier.

The M110A2 is shorter than the original M110 and lighter as well at 10.5 lb (4.8 kg), which is comparable to the M110A1 SDMR's weight of 10.9 lb (4.9 kg) with no attachments save an unloaded magazine. The decreased overall length does not come at the cost of barrel length as the M110A2 still has a 20 in (510 mm) barrel. KAC had a 5 year $13 million contract in 2020 to supply the Army with M110 rifles and this was amended in 2022 to include the M110A2 version of the rifle.

The Navy and Marine Corps, which had previously been interested in the M110A1 CSASS, decided to instead pursue an M110 SASS PIP (Product Improvement Program) for FY2021 based on findings indicating improved range and lethality with the PIP compared to the M110A1 CSASS. Funding for subsequent fiscal years has been devoted to this PIP.

=== M110A3 (6.5mm Creedmoor conversion) ===
The M110A3 is a 6.5mm Creedmoor conversion for SOCOM M110 rifles. In October 2019, NSWC Crane ordered KAC's self-termed M110K1 conversion kits to upgrade USSOCOM's M110s to fire 6.5mm Creedmoor, with 14.5-inch (370 mm) and 22-inch (560 mm) barreled configurations.

These conversion kits included complete upper receiver assemblies chambered for 6.5 Creedmoor as well as new muzzle brakes, and B5 Systems collapsible precision buttstocks. New QD suppressors for 6.5 Creedmoor were to be ordered separately.

== Users ==
- Bahamas
- Belize
- Benin
- Brazil: Used by Army Special Forces
- Bhutan
- Cameroon
- Chad
- Czech Republic
- Georgia: Used by GSOF.
- Hungary
- Iraq
- Kenya
- Latvia
- Malaysia
- Mexico
- Moldova
- Peru
- Poland: Used by Polish Special Forces.
- Romania
- Senegal
- Singapore
- Slovakia
- Thailand
- Tunisia
- Turkey
- Ukraine: Reported to be used by special forces units under GUR, SBU, SSO and Ukrainian National Guard control. Foreign soldiers in the International Legion have used them in combat missions.
- United States: Used by both US Army and Marine snipers.

== See also ==
- M110A1 rifle
- Tabuk Sniper Rifle
- Chukavin sniper rifle
- Dragunov sniper rifle
- PSR-90
- SR-25
- Barrett M82
