= Effective range =

Operational range in various contexts

Effective range is a term with several definitions depending upon context.

== Distance ==
Effective range may describe a distance between two points where one point is subject to an energy release at the other point. The source, receiver, and conditions between the two points must be specified to define an effective range. Effective range may represent the maximum distance at which a measuring device or receiver will predictably respond to an energy release of specified magnitude. Alternatively, effective range may be the maximum distance at which the energy released from a specified device will cause the desired effect on a target receiver. Angular dispersion may be significant to effectiveness for asymmetrical energy propagation toward small targets.

=== Weapons ===
The following definition has been attributed to the United States Department of Defense: The maximum distance at which a weapon may be expected to be accurate and achieve the desired effect. Accuracy is ambiguous in the absence of a specified hit probability per unit of ammunition; and for any given weapon, the desired effect could be interpreted differently depending upon the target. Subjective interpretation of these variables has caused endless and heated debate for more than a century.

With the addition of clinometers fixed machine gun squads could set long ranges and deliver plunging fire or indirect fire at more than 2,500 m (2,730 yd). This indirect firing method exploits the maximal practical range, that is defined by the maximum range of a small-arms projectile while still maintaining the minimum kinetic energy required to put unprotected personnel out of action, which is generally believed to be 15 kilogram-meters (147 J / 108 ft⋅lbf). Advanced planned and unplanned map and range table predicted support/harassment firing methods developed during World War I like plunging fire or indirect fire were not as commonly used by machine gunners during World War II and later as they were during World War I.

=== Vehicles ===
In a broader context, effective range describes the distance a vehicle (including weapon launch platforms like a ship or aircraft) may be expected to deliver a specified payload from a base or refueling point.

== Statistics ==
In statistics, range refers to the difference between the largest and smallest value of a set of quantified observations. Some observers consider it appropriate to remove unusually high or low outlying values to narrow the observed range to an effective range of the quantity being observed. Inferences based on effective range are of somewhat doubtful value if subjective judgement is used to determine which observations are discarded.

== Nuclear physics ==
In nuclear physics research, effective range is a physical parameter in the dimension of length to characterize an effective scattering square well potential. It is related to the scattering phase shift by,

$k\cot\delta = -\gamma + \frac{1}{2}\left ( \gamma^2+k^2 \right )r_0+O\left(k^4r_o^3\right)$.

where $\gamma$ is defined by the relation of deuteron binding energy $\epsilon=\hbar^2/M\gamma^2$.

In the limit of zero energy ($k^2/2m=0$), the scattering length can be related to effective length with $\alpha=\frac{1}{a}=\gamma\left(1-\frac{1}{2}\gamma r_0\right)$.
