= Gun Digest =

Annual firearms book

Gun Digest Magazine
- Editor: Luke Hartle
- Digital Editor: Elwood Shelton
- Categories: Firearms
- Frequency: Monthly (Magazine)
- Format: Print and Digital
- Publisher: Gun Digest Media
- Founder: Follett Publishing Co.
- Founded: 1944
- Company: Caribou Media, LLC.
- Country: United States
- Based in: Appleton, Wisconsin
- Language: English
- Website: https://gundigest.com/
- ISSN: 1938-5943

Gun Digest Media is an American publisher specializing in firearms, shooting, ammunition reloading and concealed carry magazines and books. Its publications include Gun Digest Magazine, GunDigest.com, and the Gun Digest Annual. The brand was founded in 1944 with the release of its annual book, making Gun Digest one of the oldest firearms-specific publishers in the nation. Gun Digest is a sister publication to RECOIL, RECOIL Offgrid, RECOIL Carnivore, and Blade Magazine.

== History ==
The brand was founded by Follett Publishing Co., a former book publisher in Chicago, which recognized a gap in the post-war firearms publishing market. The inaugural Gun Digest annual provided comprehensive information and reviews on firearms, establishing itself as a trusted resource for firearm enthusiasts.

Gun Digest underwent significant transformations over the years. It was acquired by Krause Publications in 1994, leading to its relocation to Iola, Wisconsin. Krause Publications was later purchased by F.W. Media in 2002, and eventually, Caribou Media acquired Gun Digest in 2018. The publisher is now based in Appleton, Wisconsin.

== Books ==
The Gun Digest annual has featured articles by renowned writers such as Jack O'Connor, Major Charles Askins, Col. Jeff Cooper, Craig Boddington, Wayne van Zwoll, and others, making it a cornerstone of gun journalism. The annual volume is renowned for its comprehensive firearms reviews, manufacturer listings, and current firearm values guide.

John T. Amber served as the longest-running editor of Gun Digest from 1951 to 1979. Since 1962, the publication has presented the annual John T. Amber Literary Award for outstanding gun writing of the year. Phil Massaro assumed the role of Editor-in-Chief in January 2020.

Gun Digest Media is a prolific publisher of firearms books, specializing in gun values, gunsmithing, concealed carry, self-defense legal aspects, and specific firearm types such as the AR-15, .22 rimfire, and shotguns. Notable titles include Massad Ayoob’s Deadly Force and the industry-leading Standard Catalog of Firearms for illustrated gun value guides. Notable Gun Digest book authors have included Massad Ayoob, Dan Shideler, Bill Loëb and Patrick Sweeney.

== Magazine And Website ==
In 1982, Gun Digest expanded its offerings by purchasing the Gun List, a monthly tabloid-style periodical that provided extensive listings of gun shows and collector resources. In 2006, the Gun List evolved into Gun Digest Magazine. While the publication maintained a comprehensive list of gun shows and collectors’ resources, it broadened its focus to include firearms journalism. The magazine expanded its sections to feature in-depth gun reviews, ammunition reloading instruction, and shooting instruction.

Gun Digest launched GunDigest.com in 2001, providing a widely used online resource for shooting and firearms enthusiasts. The website offers a wealth of information, including product reviews, expert advice, and the latest news in the firearms community. The company also manages the GunValues.GunDigest.com, a subscription-based gun price resource.
