= Vortex Flash Hider =

Firearm muzzle device

The Vortex Flash Hider or Vortex Flash Eliminator is a flash suppressor made by Smith Enterprise, Inc. for a variety of different rifles, carbines, machine guns and handguns.

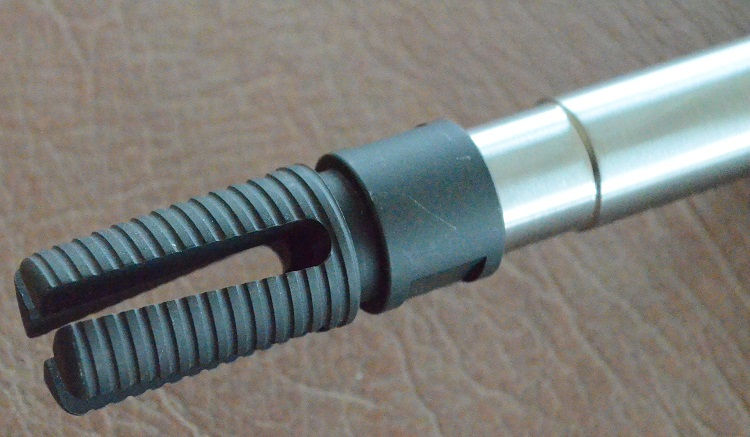
Vortex Flash Hider mounted on an AR-15 rifle.

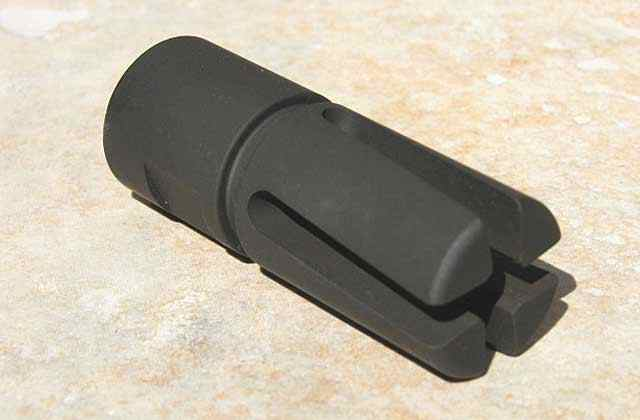
Vortex Flash Hider viewed from the front.

== History ==
The Vortex Flash Hider was developed in 1984, and a patent was secured in 1995. Sonja Sommers and Ron Smith of SEI developed the Vortex Flash Hider that incorporates a 5-, 10- and 15-degree twisted helix design, which eliminates up to 99% of visible muzzle flash. The Vortex is somewhat reminiscent of the original "three-prong flash hider" found on the original Vietnam-era M16. However, the Vortex is more robust and makes use of four solid tines, which are equally spaced and angled 6° from a centerline of the body. The Vortex is the only flash suppressor in the world with a helical flute design that breaks up the flash at multiple locations and angles. SEI makes the Vortex for M16s, AR-15s, M14s, Steyr AUGs and certain pistols such as the Heckler & Koch USP Tactical model.

== AR-15 rifles ==
The Vortex Flash Hider made for AR-15 type rifles weighs 3 ounces, is 2.25 inches in length and does not require a lock washer for attachment to the barrel of an AR-15. The use of a lock washer or crush washer was rejected as their use can increase visible flash from the shooter's perspective. The Vortex is tightened by hand and repeated firing of the rifle causes the Vortex to tighten to the barrel.

The Vortex Flash Hider has been called the "most effective flash hider available short of a (sound) suppressor" by writer and gunsmith Patrick Sweeney, when used on an AR-15. In a 2005 article appearing in SWAT magazine it was deemed to be superior to the M16A2 "bird cage" flash suppressor and the Yankee Hill Machine Phantom Flash Suppressor. Peter G. Kokalis of Soldier of Fortune magazine and Shotgun News wrote that he installed over 300 Vortex Flash hiders while working as a military advisor with a Central American paramilitary unit in the 1980s.

The Vortex Flash Hider is used by the US Military on M4 carbines and M16 rifles with the NATO Stock Number of NSN 1005-01-591-5825, PN 1001V.

== M14 rifles ==
The Vortex Flash Hider has been used on the US Army's SOCCOM M14 rifle as the SEI 2000V and was chosen because it reduces visible flash by 99%. Installation of the SEI 2000V requires removal of the factory front sight and shooters in need of a front sight for their rifle can replace the rifle's gas block with a unit from Smith that includes an attached front sight post. The Crazy Horse rifle and the Mk 14 Enhanced Battle Rifle (both made by SEI) utilize the M14 Vortex as well and the Wind Talker sound suppressor and its predecessor, the M14 Direct Connect, were designed to fit over the Vortex in a direct connect fashion.

== 50 caliber rifles and machine guns ==
In 2011 Naval Surface Warfare Center Crane Division adopted the Vortex Flash Hider for use on 50 caliber machine guns and rifles after it was rated the number one suppressor in their test report. The testing performed by CRANE showed that the Vortex maintained a 95% flash reduction threshold through 10,000 rounds of machine gun fire and was proven to not adversely affect normal combat functions, weapon firing or cycling, or interfere with mechanical sights. The US Military's NATO Stock Number for this flash hider is NSN 1005-01-603-1401, PN 6021.

== Other rifles and machineguns ==
Smith Enterprise manufactures the Vortex for a variety of other rifles such as the AK-47, HK91, Steyr Aug, FN-FAL and IMI Galil. Additionally, the company makes flash suppressors for installation on the M240 machine gun and M249 SAW with the NATO Stock Number 1005-01-600-857, PN 1041V. Vortex Flash Hiders can be installed on traditional bolt-action rifles and rifles such as the Ruger 10/22, Ruger Mini-14 and Ruger Mini-30, if the barrel is cut for the appropriate threads.
