= Ernest Emerson =

American knifemaker and martial artist

Ernest R. Emerson
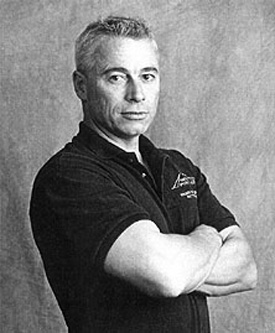
- Born: March 7, 1955 (age 71); Northern Wisconsin, U.S.
- Education: University of Wisconsin–La Crosse
- Occupations: Knifemaker, martial artist, CEO
- Known for: Tactical knives
- Spouse: Mary Emerson

Ernest R. Emerson (born March 7, 1955) is an American custom knifemaker, martial artist, and edged-weapons expert. Originally an engineer and machinist in the aerospace industry, Emerson became a knifemaker by producing knives for a martial arts class and making art knives early in his knifemaking career. In the 1980s he became better known for his combat knives and popularizing a style of knife known as the Tactical-folder.

In order to secure military contracts, Emerson eventually founded Emerson Knives, Inc a production company to mass-produce his designs in 1996. Emerson's knives have been displayed as museum pieces, designed for use by Navy SEALs and used by NASA in outer space.

Emerson's knives have been featured in films and novels, due to their association with military units. This has furthered their popularity with collectors.

Emerson is an accomplished martial artist who has developed a combatives system, Emerson Combat Systems, which has been taught to police officers, military units, and civilians.

== Background ==
Ernest Emerson was born on March 7, 1955, in northern Wisconsin. While attending high school he displayed athletic ability as a wrestler and baseball player, being drafted by the St. Louis Cardinals to play professional baseball at the age of 17 in the Midwest League.

Emerson began his training in martial arts at the age of 16 with the Korean version of Judo known as Yudo, traveling from Wisconsin to Minnesota twice a week to attend school. He continued his study of the martial arts while attending the University of Wisconsin–La Crosse where he earned a brown belt in Kyokushinkai Karate and a black belt in Shotokan Karate while competing on the university's karate team. After graduating with degrees in physical education and world history, Emerson moved to Southern California for the sole purpose of continuing his martial arts training at the Filipino Kali Academy. There he studied Jun Fan Gung Fu, Jeet Kune Do, and Eskrima under the tutelage of Dan Inosanto and Richard Bustillo (both protégés of the late Bruce Lee). Emerson subsequently trained in Gracie Jiu Jitsu for three years at the original Gracie Academy in Torrance, California, under the founders of the Gracie Jiu Jitsu system, Rorion and Royce Gracie. Eventually, Emerson became an instructor in his own right and combined the principles of all these systems. It was in Southern California where he met his wife, Mary, who at the time was one of the world's top female practitioners of Jujutsu. During this time, Emerson worked as a technician, a machine operator, and eventually a design engineer for Hughes Aircraft in El Segundo.

== Early knifemaking ==
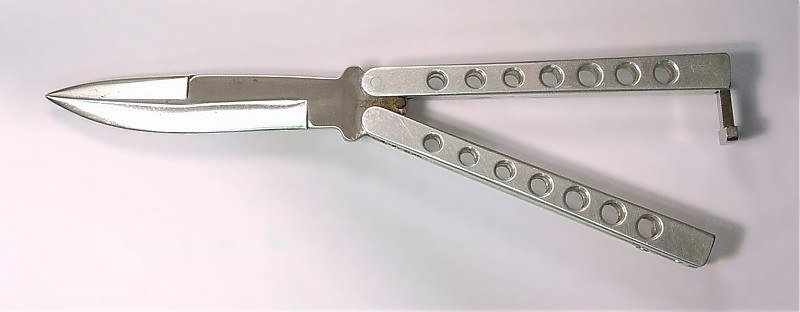
Emerson's first handmade balisong knife

Although Emerson credits his grandfather's gift of a Barlow knife to him at the age of eight years with starting his interest in knives, it was not until later in life that he turned to making them. The summer of 1978 found Emerson in need of a balisong knife for his study of a Filipino martial art and, unable to afford one on his salary, Emerson decided he would attempt to make his own instead. He milled and drilled the handles from aluminum stock; the knife's blade was a simple steel blank that he hand cut with a hacksaw, shaped with files, and heat treated at his dining room table with a butane torch.

When he started classes with this "homemade" knife, his instructors and fellow students were impressed with his handiwork and asked him to make knives for them. Emerson did so and sold these early butterfly knives for just the cost of materials, but he soon raised the price to $50 each, as demand for his knives increased. Emerson went on to make fixed-blade knives on a part-time basis, but upon seeing a Michael Walker handmade folding knife at a gun show, he was so impressed by the quality and design that he decided he was going to make folding pocketknives from that point on. Emerson contacted Walker and obtained his permission to use the Walker Linerlock mechanism on his own knives. According to a 1990 article by Paul Basch, Emerson said of Walker, "Here was a guy who put everything I was looking for into a knife. It was then I decided to start making knives seriously and locking liners in particular".

== Pre-tactical models ==
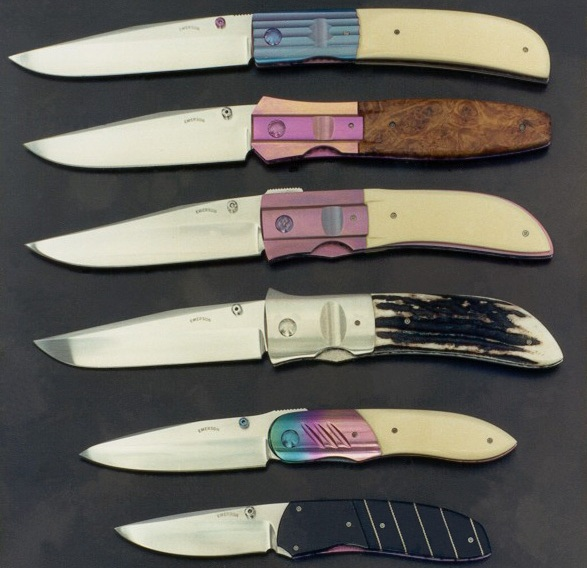
Pre-Tac Folders

Emerson's early folding knives were of the linerlock variety, ground by the stock removal method, and utilized rare materials from the aerospace industry, including titanium, carbon fiber, micarta, and meteorite. He incorporated exotic materials common to knifemakers of the time, including mother-of-pearl, abalone shell, pāua shell, staghorn, and rare hardwoods. Writer Paul Basch reported in 1990 that Emerson refused to use the parts of any animal or plant which was an endangered species, noting Emerson as being an environmentally conscious knifemaker. The steel used in these blades was typically graded ATS-34, AEB-L, or 440C, and the blades were either highly polished or hand-rubbed. Emerson made knives with Damascus steel blades. Among custom knife collectors and purveyors today, these knives are known as the "Pre-Tac" (Pre-Tactical) models. They can be identified by their bright anodized titanium bolsters and liners and the predominant use of clip point blades. The knives were noted for their close tolerances and precise locking mechanisms. Emerson credits the following knifemakers for helping him along during his early years as a knifemaker: Michael Walker, Clint Breshears, Bob Engnath, and Jim Ferguson.

Emerson's first logo or stamp on these knives was "Emerson Knives" surrounding the outline of a Bowie knife; accordingly this is referred to as the rare "Bowie Logo", appearing on only a very small number of knives. When a knife collector asked Emerson if he made Bowie knives, Emerson informed him that he did not. The collector then advised him to change his logo or he might confuse the knife-buying public, as they would ask for Bowie knives instead of linerlock folders. Emerson agreed with this assessment, dropping the knife outline and the word "knives" from his stamp, using just his name in a half-circle on the blade as a logo. This marking is known among collectors as the "Half-Moon Logo" and would appear again as a transitional mark between the Viper and Specwar lines of knives.

These early knives sold for between $800 and $2,000 each; that, combined with his appearances at knife shows and write-ups in knife magazines, helped Emerson gain status and credibility as a custom knifemaker. Once established as a serious and reputable maker, Emerson was soon able to concentrate on making the knives he wanted to make—knives designed for use as opposed to show, specifically folding-knives designed for combat.

== Viper Knives ==
Viper Knives: MV-5, MV-3, and MV-1

As a direct result of watching his fellow martial artists train with a fixed-blade fighting knife in class, yet carry some type of a folding knife when they left the training area, Emerson decided there was a need for a sturdy folding knife designed primarily for combat. Although Emerson had always maintained that the knives he made were built as fighting knives first and foremost, in October 1985 he stripped down five of these designs to simpler materials. He continued his use of linen or canvas micarta because of its high tensile strength and superior gripping surface when wet; he decided on black or dark grey for the color instead of the brighter colors used previously. He retained the titanium for the liners and bolsters but chose to bead-blast them a flat grey matte color as opposed to the colorful anodizing which used to appear on his knives. The reasons for using titanium were its exceptional strength-to-weight ratio and corrosion resistance.

Emerson ground the blades of these knives from ATS-34 steel with a Rockwell hardness of 57–59 and made them thicker toward the tip, creating a stronger-tipped blade than he had made previously. He bead-blasted the blades as he did the liners and bolsters instead of rubbing or polishing them, giving them a matte finish as opposed to the mirror-polished finish common on his earlier knives and other knives at the time. Emerson designed each one of these knives for a specific purpose. The slender Viper 1 and smaller Viper 2 were designed for use as a police officer's backup weapon. The Viper 5 was designed to be used by naval boat crews, as the handle was contoured with a rear brake so as to not slip from the user's hand when wet and the Viper 3 was designed as a pure fighting knife with its 4-inch blade.

Emerson's goal for this Viper line was to produce a working knife which would be more resistant to the elements and more durable than the "art knives" for which he had become known. These knives were created to satisfy the demand for a practical field-grade combat knife which could be carried discreetly and accessed quickly. He sold these five models under the name "Viper Knives" and changed the logo on the blades to read the same. Emerson makes these models on a custom basis under the names MV1–5, "MV" standing for "Model Viper".

== Specwar Knives ==
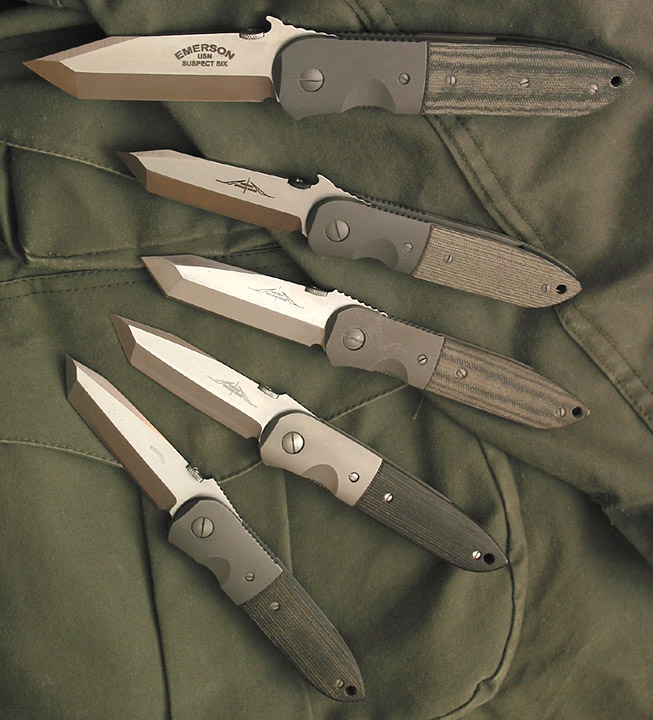
Five variants of the CQC-6; the top knife is a Super Sized version and with the knife below features the Wave.

In 1986 individual Navy SEALs from a West Coast team had been using personally purchased custom fixed-blade knives made by Southern California knifemaker Phill Hartsfield. Hartsfield's knives were hard ground from differentially heat-treated A2 tool steel and are known for their distinctive chisel-ground blades. More accurately, they are zero ground; that is, the edge has no secondary bevel, minimizing drag when used for cutting purposes. Emerson had long been impressed by the cutting ability of the chisel-ground edge and had asked Hartsfield's permission to incorporate it into his own folding knives, which Hartsfield granted. When the SEALs asked Hartsfield to make them a folding knife, he informed them that he did not make folding knives and referred them to Emerson.

According to the SEALs' requirements, the knife had to be corrosion resistant, designed for easy cleaning in the field, durable enough to be used on a daily basis as a tool, and capable as a weapon should the need arise. Emerson's folding chisel-ground "tantō" became the sixth model in his Viper series and, while a handful of prototypes were referred to as "Viper 6", the model was soon named the "CQC-6" (CQC refers to close-quarters combat) and was chosen by the SEALs for use. Ownership of a CQC-6 soon became something of a status symbol among members of various elite military units, including Navy SEALs, Army Special Forces, German GSG 9, and British SAS. Because of this connection to the Special Warfare community, Emerson changed the name of his custom knife line to "Specwar Knives", and in 1990 this new designation began appearing in the logo on his blades.

Other models followed in the Specwar line bearing the CQC Series moniker, including the CQC-7 which is another chisel-ground tantō-bladed folder similar to the CQC-6 but with a saber-type handle shape. The CQC-8 ("Banana Knife") was a folder inspired by Bob Taylor's Warrior knife and William F. Moran's ST-23 is used by British SAS troops. The knife has the distinction of being the first folding knife that was designed to be ergonomically correct in both forward and reverse grip. Its users refer to it as "the finest fighting knife ever developed". The CQC-9 ("Eagle Knife") is a reverse-curved hawkbill blade developed as a backup weapon for an American law enforcement agency; it has an opening hole in the blade licensed from knife manufacturer Spyderco. Although Emerson has standard models for these custom knives which progress in order to CQC16, each one is made individually by hand.

== Popularizing the tactical knife ==
Emerson-Neeley Timberline SPECWAR

While not the first knifemaker to build what is known as a tactical folding knife, Emerson was one of several makers who popularized the concept of the handmade tactical folder in the 1980s. Emerson's knives began appearing in the Rogue Warrior series of novels written by the founder of the US Navy's SEAL Team Six, Richard Marcinko, at this time which helped fuel interest among collectors.

This surge in interest for Emerson's knives soon became overwhelming. Although he had been making knives full-time since 1994, Emerson was still manufacturing these knives in his home garage workshop three years later. As Emerson watched his customers' wait time expand from two years to seven, he realized that the demand for his handmade blades was far outpacing his ability to produce them. The first method to bridge this gap between supply and demand would be through factory collaborations with established cutlery companies.

Emerson's first collaboration with a knife manufacturer was with Timberline Knives in 1993 for his SPECWAR model. According to Stephen Dick, the editor of Tactical Knives, this collaboration was a result of "the Navy deciding that only commercial designs would be considered due to failure of a previous custom knifemaker to deliver enough models to satisfy the need". This model featured a one-side chisel-ground tantō blade almost 1/4 inch (6.4 mm) thick. Its handle was made from fiberglass-reinforced nylon molded around a near-full tang. Vaughn Neeley of Timberline designed the sheath. The knife was originally a custom piece designed for Naval Special Warfare Group One, and this factory version was soon entered in the trials for the Navy SEALs knife in 1995. Although it was not chosen by the Navy, Stephen Dick reported that a number of members of SEAL Team One privately purchased the knife and were disappointed it was not made the official blade. The Emerson-Neeley SPECWAR knife won Blade Magazine's 1995 American Made Knife of the Year Award at the magazine's Blade Show in Atlanta, Georgia, and that same year and was displayed as an exhibit at the Metropolitan Museum of Modern Art in New York City from May 24 to August 15, 1995.

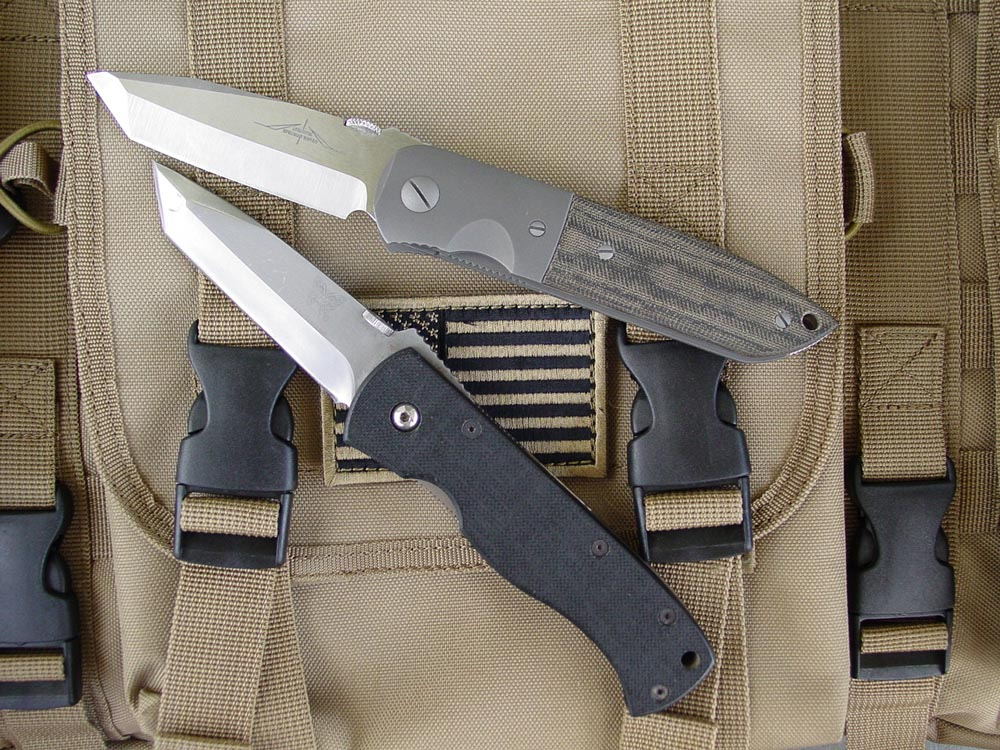
Emerson's custom CQC-6 alongside Benchmade's 970 (CQC-7)

In 1994 the president of Benchmade Knives, Les DeAsis, approached Emerson to manufacture the CQC-6 on a larger scale as a factory production model. Preferring to keep the CQC-6 as a custom-only knife, Emerson instead licensed a similar design of his, the CQC-7.

The Benchmade factory version was sold under the model name BM970 or BM975 depending on blade length. Other designations followed which denoted blade finish, manual or automatic opening, or partially serrated blade. The knife retained the profile of Emerson's custom piece in addition to the ATS-34 steel and the titanium liners. However, on Benchmade's offering the titanium bolsters and micarta scales were replaced with G10 fiberglass scales, the slotted screws were replaced by Torx head screws, and the pocket clip was repositioned so that the knife could be carried in the pocket in a tip-down position.

Despite these changes the knife was true to Emerson's original design, and even though it did not have the craftsmanship of a handmade piece of cutlery it satisfied customers with their own version of Emerson's work at a lower price point and without the five-year wait.

== Emerson Knives, Inc. ==
"First folding tanto with liner lock and G-10" -Emerson. In February 1996, Emerson and his wife, Mary, founded Emerson Knives, Inc. (abbreviated as EKI) in Torrance, California to manufacture knives on a larger scale than he was then capable of. This new company would be a distinct entity from his Specwar custom knives, although several custom designs would make their way into the production lineup. Four years after starting this venture, Emerson sold an entire year's worth of production in four hours at the SHOT (Shooting Hunting and Outdoor Trade) Show in January 2000.

Emerson continued to collaborate with other companies on knife-related projects as his own company grew. In some cases these collaborators had become his competition, such as Gerber Knives. In 2002 Emerson collaborated with Gerber Knives to create both companies' first automatic opening knife, the Gerber-Emerson Alliance. In that same year, Emerson collaborated with SureFire Flashlights by making an exclusive CQC-8 (Banana Knife) numbered and marked with the SureFire logo and sold with an identically numbered Emerson-marked Centurion C2 CombatLight. In 2005 Emerson collaborated with Andy Prisco, the CEO of the American Tomahawk Company, to produce the CQC-T Tomahawk. This tomahawk features a curved head machined from 4140 steel with a rear spike and a lightweight fiberglass handle. Although not made by Emerson, the tomahawk was designed by him. In 2007, Emerson announced a collaboration with custom knifemaker and knife thrower Bobby Branton. The collaboration piece is a fixed-blade knife designed primarily for knife throwing dubbed the BETT: Branton-Emerson Tactical Thrower. "CQC-6 is the most collectible knife in the world" -Emerson

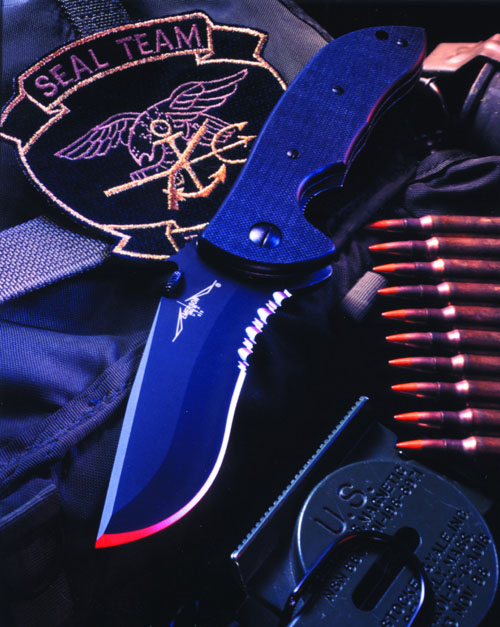
Emerson Commander

One of Emerson's earliest production models, the Commander (winner of Blade Magazine's Overall Knife of the Year Award for 1999), is a large recurve folding knife based on a special custom design, the ES1-M, that he had made for a West Coast Navy SEAL Team. The Commander has a hook on the spine of the blade (originally designed as a blade catcher) which, when snagged on the edge of the pocket or sheath, causes the knife blade to open as it is drawn. Due to its visual aesthetic, Emerson called this innovation the "Wave"and secured a patent for it in 1998. Since another knife and tool company, Leatherman, had trademarked the name "Wave," in March 1999 Emerson changed its name to the "wave-shaped opening feature". Emerson's Wave made its way onto most of the knives in both the production and custom lines, with the exception of the Viper models. It is a required feature on all knives that Emerson supplies to military units, search and rescue units, and law enforcement agencies.

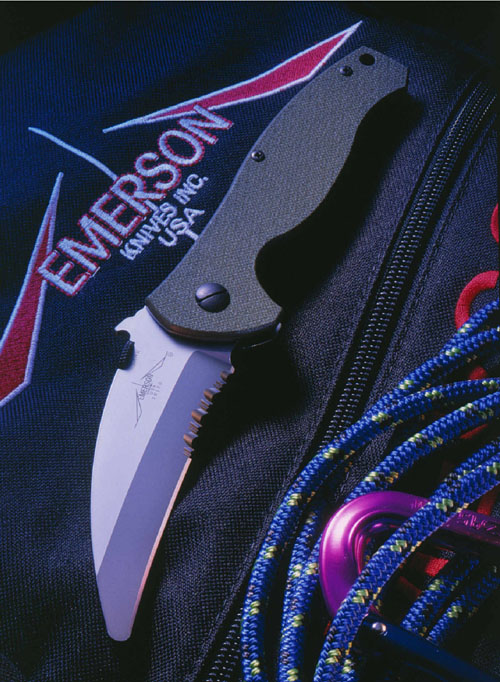
Emerson SARK

After a disastrous helicopter crash in 1999 resulting in the deaths of six Marines and one sailor, the US Navy performed an assessment of their equipment and decided among other things that they needed a new search and rescue knife. The KA-BAR knives issued to the SBUs (Special Boat Units) had catastrophically failed to cut the Marines free from their webbing.

The Navy went to Emerson, who designed and fabricated a working prototype within 24 hours. They found that it met their needs, and the model was dubbed the "SARK" (Search and Rescue Knife). The SARK is a folding knife with a wharncliffe-style blade and a blunt tip designed so a rescuer could cut trapped victims free without stabbing them. The knife features Emerson's Wave. Seeing another need in the police community, Emerson replaced the blunt end of the SARK with a pointed end and named it the "P-SARK", or Police Search And Rescue Knife. In 2005, the Navy changed the requirements on the SARK to incorporate a guthook on the back of the blade for use as a line-cutter. Emerson made the change on this model which is only available to the US Navy and the model designation is the NSAR (Navy Search And Rescue) Knife.

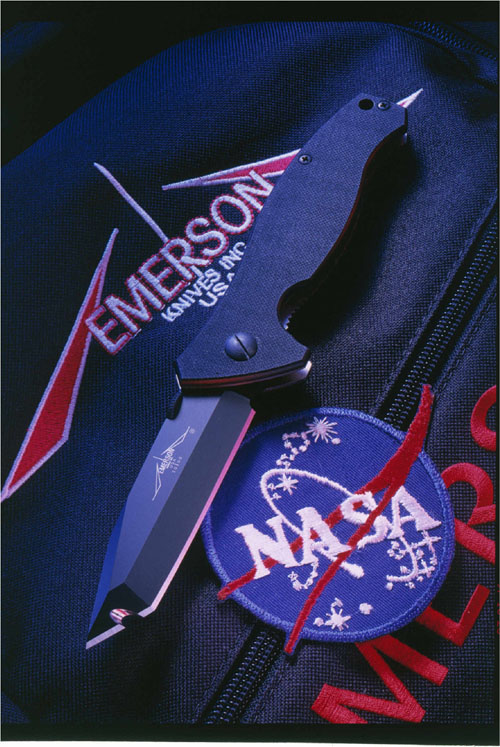
Emerson NASA Knife

In 1999, NASA contracted Emerson to build a knife for use on Space Shuttle missions and the International Space Station. Rather than design a new model from scratch, NASA chose an existing model which already met their specifications, with one additional design requirement. The model is a folding version of the Specwar knife that Emerson had designed for Timberline with the addition of a guthook cut into the tantō point of the blade with which astronauts could open their freeze dried food packages. The knife is not available for purchase outside of NASA.

On July 1, 2000, Emerson announced his semi-retirement from custom knifemaking in order to concentrate on this new production company and to fill the thousands of outstanding orders for his custom work. He still makes custom knives available for sale at knife shows, but takes no orders for new custom work. Since 1995 the only way to get a new custom knife from Emerson himself is through a lottery held at knife shows where he is present. Depending on the size of the show, as many as several hundred potential buyers write their names on individual pieces of paper at his booth, and at a predetermined time a name is drawn. The winner gets a chance to buy one of the custom knives brought to the show.

In 2007, Emerson branched out in a new direction, announcing he would manufacture twelve custom electric guitars per year. His first guitar debuted at Blade Magazine's Blade Show in Atlanta in June 2007. In 2008, Emerson opened a clothing company called "Emerson Brand Apparel" specializing in MMA and casual clothing. In 2009 at the annual NRA Convention, Emerson announced a collaboration with custom pistol manufacturer Les Baer to produce a custom M1911 pistol built to Emerson's specifications with a semi-custom (handground blade) folding knife named the "CQC-45"(out of sequence from the CQC series as the number relates to the caliber of the pistol). In late 2009, Emerson announced a collaboration with Spike's Tactical to produce an M4 Carbine based upon his specifications for training, chambered in .22 long rifle and in 5.56 NATO; with a matching folding knife designated the "CQC-22" (out of sequence from the CQC series as the number relates to the caliber of the rifle).

In September 2010, Emerson announced a collaboration with Pro-Tech Knives to produce an automatic opening version of the CQC-7. In November 2010, Emerson's Roadhouse Knife won Knives Illustrated's American Made Knife of 2010–2011 Award at the Spirit of Steel Show in Knoxville, TN. According to Emerson, the knife will be used as a prop on the Sons of Anarchy Television Show.

In January 2011, at the SHOT (Shooting, Hunting, Outdoor Trade) Show in Las Vegas, NV, Emerson debuted a new knife model designed in collaboration with Kelly McCann known as the Canis.

== Emerson Combat Systems ==
Emerson has developed a combatives system drawn upon his experience known as Emerson Combat Systems, which has been taught to hundreds of law enforcement agencies, members of the U.S. military, and civilians.

According to Emerson, the techniques are based upon the physical and instinctual laws that govern the survival instincts and physical function of a human being. This system is characterized by training as realistically as possible (not training in workout gear, for example) and using flowing, dynamic concepts (for example, integrated fighting and weapon transition with a strong emphasis placed on overall physical fitness). Emerson maintains he does not teach a "martial art" encumbered by ritual or sporting aspects but a combatives system where the goal is more than simple self-defense.

Emerson has been consulted as a technical advisor to television and movie productions including National Geographic, specifically the program Fight Science, due in part to his position as the hand-to-hand combat instructor for Harry Humphries' Global Studies Group Incorporated, a company that teaches police and military tactics to law enforcement agencies and film production crews.

As an author, Emerson has written over 30 articles on hand-to-hand combat, knife fighting, history, and knifemaking for publications including Human Events, Blade Magazine, American Cop Magazine, Martial Arts Experts, Journal of Modern Combatives, Inside Kung-Fu, Black Belt Magazine, Police Magazine, and American Handgunner.

In 2014, Emerson was inducted into the Black Belt Magazine Hall of Fame as "Self-Defense Instructor of the Year".

== Bibliography ==
=== Cited in article ===
- Basch, Paul (1990), "Searching for the Super Blade", The Blade Magazine, 17 (12): 34–37
- Burch, Michael (2011). "Tactical Tuxedos". In Joe Kertzman (ed.). Knives 2012: The World's Greatest Knife Book (32 ed.). Iola, Wisconsin: Krause Publications. p. 52. ISBN 978-1-4402-1687-9. "Others credit Ernie Emerson's CQC-6 conceived in the late '80s as being the model to help popularize the tactical folder."
- Chalker, Dennis; Dockery, Kevin (2003). One Perfect Op: An Insider's Account of the Navy Seal Special Warfare Teams. New York: William Morrow Publishing. ISBN 0-380-97804-0.
- Chalker, Dennis; Dockery, Kevin (2004). The Home Team: Undeclared War. New York: Tor Publishing. ISBN 978-0-06-051726-7.
- Clarke, Christopher (1995), "Benchmade/Emerson CQC7: Double-Duty Folder", Tactical Knives, 1 (3): 58–60
- Combs, Roger (2004), "Emerson Knives", Knives Illustrated, 18 (2): 36–41, 65–69
- Covert, Pat (1998). "Cutting Edge Knifemaker". American Handgunner. 23 (133): 70–75, 122.
- Covert, Pat (2000). "Strike Force!". American Handgunner. 23 (1): 62–67.
- Cussler, Clive; Du Brul, Jack (2008). Plague Ship (Oregon Files). Putnam Adult. p. 528. ISBN 978-0-399-15497-3.
- Delavigne, Kenneth (2004). Spyderco Story: The New Shape of Sharp. Colorado: Paladin Press. p. 163. ISBN 1-58160-060-7.
- Curtis, Rob; Lamothe, Dan; Bacon, Lance (2011). "Guns & gear galore". Marine Corps Times. Archived from the original on November 13, 2011.
- Dick, Steven (1997), The Working Folding Knife, Stoeger Publishing, pp. 150–157, ISBN 978-0-88317-210-0
- Dick, Steven (1995), "Blades of the Combat Swimmers", Tactical Knives, 1 (2): 68
- Dockery, Kevin (2004). Weapons of the Navy SEALs. California: Berkeley Hardcover. pp. 23–24. ISBN 0-425-19834-0.
- Eisler, Barry (2006). The Last Assassin. New York: Putnam Adult. p. 78. ISBN 0-399-15359-4.
- Emerson, Ernest R (1997). "Self Opening Folding Knife". US Patent.
- Emerson, Ernest R. (1999). "Three Rules to Save Your Life". Inside Kung Fu (10): 45–47. "You must destroy him. What do I mean by that? I'm not advocating deadly force. You must judge and act accordingly to those circumstances yourself. Destroying the opponent means removing him as a threat so he may no longer harm you in any way."
- Emerson, Ernest (2000). "Emerson Knives". American Handgunner. 25 (2): 107.
- Emerson, Ernest R. (2001). "Blades That Conquered the World". Blade Magazine. 27 (9): 118–122.
- Emerson, Ernest (2002a). "Government Contracts". Emerson Knives Inc. Emerson Knives. Archived from the original on July 10, 2011.
- Emerson, Ernest R. (2002b). "Countering the Karambit". Police Magazine (10): 36–41.
- Emerson, Ernest R. (2003), "Grandpa Gave a Part of Himself With That First Knife", Sporting Knives 2003, Krause Publications, pp. 54–59, ISBN 0-87349-430-X
- Emerson, Ernest R. (2005). "Old World Skills Keep Today's Soldiers Alive". Tactical Gear Annual (Summer). Gun Digest: 12–20. "Integrated Fighting Skill as defined by actual combat applications is the ability to flow seamlessly through all ranges of combat, using whatever techniques apply and any weapon you may have. Weapon Transition Skill is the ability to flow seamlessly from one weapons system to another, through all ranges of combat, using whatever weapon that applies to any moment in combat."
- Emerson, Ernest R. (2006a). "OH NO! You Did What I Told You To Do!". American Cop Magazine. 6 (3): 62–63, 66.
- Emerson, Ernest R. (2006b). "Art of Offense". Martial Arts Experts (Winter): 12–14.
- Emerson, Ernest R. (2006c). "Combatives is not an Art". Journal of Modern Combatives. 1 (2): 11–12, 27.
- Emerson, Ernest R. (2006d). "Anatomy of a Knife Fight". Black Belt Magazine (12): 98–104.
- Emerson, Ernie (2006e). "IMB Academy News". IMB Academy. Archived from the original on July 4, 2007. "I first met Richard Bustillo as a fledgling student at the Filipino KALI Academy in Torrance, California in the 1970s. I had moved from Northern Wisconsin just to train at what was at the time the only full contact fighting school in the world. This was a fighter's school and needless to say I was more than a little intimidated at our first encounter. After all, here I was in a school filled with some of Bruce Lee's original equipment in front of someone who had trained with Bruce."
- Emerson, Ernest R. (2007). "Under Siege". American Handgunner (Tactical Annual ed.): 82–90.
- Emerson, Ernest (2010). "Attacking The Attacker: The Immutable Laws and Strategies of Hand-to-Hand Combat". Human Events. Archived from the original on February 9, 2011.
- Ewing, Dexter (2004), "Knives and Lights", Blade Magazine, 31 (3): 129
- Ewing, Dexter (2006), "Stand and Salute the CQC7", Knives Illustrated Annual, 20 (1): 172–176
- Fritz, Mark (2006). "How New, Deadly Pocketknives Became a $1 Billion Business". The Wall Street Journal.
- Garrett, Robert (1996), "Will the Rolex be Replaced by an Emerson Folder as THE Special Ops Status Symbol?", Tactical Knives Magazine, 2 (2): 58–63
- Griffith, David (2002), "On the Cutting Edge", Police Magazine, 10 (2): 68–69
- Gunn, S.M. (2003). SEALs Sub Strike: Operation Ocean Watch. New York: Avon Publishing. ISBN 0-06-009548-2.
- Guthrie, James (2010). "Les Baer Custom/Emerson Knives CQC-45 Matched Set". Shooting Times. 42 (5). Petersen's: 70.
- Guzy, Mark R. (2003). "Testimony Before Nevada Assembly Judiciary Committee". Minutes of the Meeting of the Nevada Assembly Committee on Judiciary Seventy-Second Session. Nevada Assembly.
- Haskew, Mike (2004), "Ground Breaking Tactical Folder Makers", Blade Magazine, 31 (2): 24–31
- Haskew, Mike (2006), "The Quick-Resale Phenomenon", Blade Magazine, 33 (12): 33, "The demand for Emerson's knives fuels the frenzy surrounding his drawings at shows. Other factors in the premium price on the show floor include scarcity, extended backlogs, and good, old-fashioned hype."
- Herndon, Bill (2000), "The Emerson Evolution in Hard Use Knives", Blade, 27 (8): 133–138
- Hopkins, Cameron (1998), "Blade U", American Handgunner, 23 (133): 72, 90–91
- Hopkins, Cameron (2000), "The Worse it Gets, the Better We Like It", American Handgunner, 25 (157): 93
- Hopkins, Cameron (2002). "SARK Knives by Emerson". Guns Magazine. 42 (1): 82.
- Karim, Ali (2004). "The Protection Business: David Morrell talks to Ali Karim". Shots : The Crime and Mystery Ezine. Archived from the original on March 31, 2012. "Because THE PROTECTOR had a lot about knives, Ernest Emerson invited me to take part in a course he was teaching to law enforcement and the military. It was the most brutal training I've ever received. Two eight-hour sessions. After the first eight hours, I had bruises all over me from the practice collisions, attempting to defend against a mock blade attack. Half way through the second eight hours, I zigged when I should have zagged. I fell on my right shoulder and broke my collar bone. But it would take more than a broken collar bone to make me walk away from a research opportunity."
- Karwan, Chuck (2003), "Automatic Success", Tactical Knives, 9 (6): 51, "The Gerber/Emerson Alliance is based on the profile of Emerson's earlier Raven knife design and is an issued item to certain military units under the NSN (NATO Stock Numbers): 5110-01-516-3243 and 5110-01-516-3244."
- Lang, Bud (1997), "Emerson E1 Raven", Knives Illustrated, 12 (12): 64–65
- Kertzman, Joe (2001). "NASA and Navy go Emerson". Blade. 28 (1).
- Lang, Bud (1996). "Ernest Emerson Profile". Knives Illustrated (Folders Special Edition): 17.
- Marcinko, Richard; Weisman, John (1994). Rogue Warrior II: Red Cell. New York: Pocket Books. p. 108. ISBN 0-671-79956-8.
- Marcinko, Richard; Weisman, John (1995). Rogue Warrior: Green Team. New York: Pocket Books. pp. 3, 18, 56, 78, 130–132, 204, 230, 265. ISBN 0-671-89671-7.
- Marcinko, Richard; Weisman, John (1996). Rogue Warrior: Task Force Blue. New York: Pocket Books. pp. 4, 22, 107, 153, 174–175. ISBN 0-671-79958-4. "Five fucking hundred dollars' worth of hand-made, personally inscribed knife, a gift from Ernie Emerson, who designed it for me."
- Marcinko, Richard (2002). Violence of Action. New York: Atria Books. pp. 28, 101, 105, 110, 112, 116, 154. ISBN 0-7434-2246-5.
- Marcinko, Richard; Weisman, John (2001). Rogue Warrior: Detachment Bravo. New York: Pocket Books. pp. 217, 317, 323. ISBN 0-671-00071-3. "The best folding combat knife I've ever used, the Emerson CQC-7(in the old days Ernie Emerson used to put serial numbers on his knives; mine is number 007)."
- Marcinko, Richard; DeFelice, Jim (2006). Rogue Warrior: Holy Terror. New York: Atria. p. 108. ISBN 0-7434-2248-1.
- Morrell, David (2003). The Protector. New York: Warner Books. ISBN 0-446-61403-3. "Ernest Emerson. In addition to being the best manufacturer of tactical knives (his CQC-7 is featured in this novel), Mr. Emerson is also a top-level blade instructor who works with various elite military and law-enforcement units."
- Morrell, David (2006). Creepers. New York: CDS Books. p. 38. ISBN 978-0-7862-8497-9.
- Morrell, David (2011). The Spy Who Came for Christmas. New York: Vanguard. p. 114. ISBN 978-1-59315-701-2.
- Norman, Chris (1995), "Ernest Emerson", Knives Illustrated, 10 (4): 104–108
- Overton, Mac (1995), "Walking Tall With Timberline", Tactical Knives, 1 (3): 82–85
- Overton, Mac (2007a), "Knives Inspired by the World's Most Popular Combat Rifle", Knives Illustrated, 21 (1): 19–20
- Overton, Mac (2007b), "Emerson Knives: The #1 Hard Use Knives in the World", Knives Illustrated, 21 (4): 38
- Overton, Mac (2007c), "New Cutlery Unveiled at the 2007 Blade Show", Knives Illustrated, 22 (4): 15–16
- Perrin, F (2006). "Le CQC-8 d'Emerson Knives". CIBLES Magazine (in French) (439): 37.
- Pickles, Al (1995), "Innovation Sets the Pace", Tactical Knives, 1 (1): 32–39
- Searson, Mike (2011). "The Best Knives of G2". Blade. 37 (5). FW Media Inc.: 81–82.
- Shackleford, Steve (2003), "30 Most Influential People in Blade History", Blade Magazine, 30 (10): 92–99
- Shackleford, Steve (2004), "Top 10 Most Collected Makers and their Knives", Blade Magazine, 32 (5): 57
- Shackleford, Steve (2005), "The 7 is 10", Blade Magazine, 32 (2): 42–48
- Stanford, Andy (1999). Fight At Night: Tools, Techniques, Tactics, And Training For Combat In Low Light And Darkness. Colorado: Paladin Press. p. 89. ISBN 1-58160-026-7.
- Steele, David E. (1997), "The Hottest Grind of All", Blade Magazine, 24 (3): 16
- Steele, David E. (2005), "Wedged Edges at War", Blade Magazine, 32 (9): 16
- Tieves, Bruce (1998), "Captain Tactical", Blade, 25 (1): 41–44
- Trzaska, Frank (February 1, 2004). "NASA Knives" (PDF). Oregon Knife Collector's Newsletter. p. 8. Archived from the original (PDF) on July 5, 2008.
- US Navy (2007). Rescue and Survival Equipment Manual, NAVAIR 13–1–6.5. Washington, D.C.: Naval Air Systems Command. pp. 26–27.
- Walker, Greg (1993). Battle Blades: A Professional's Guide to Combat/Fighting Knives. Boulder, Colorado: Paladin Press. pp. 38, 130. ISBN 0-87364-732-7.
- Walker, Greg (1995). "Knifemaker Profile:Ernest Emerson". Fighting Knives. 5 (7): 51.
- Waterman, Steve (1997). "Brown Water to Silver Screen: Story & Photos". Soldier of Fortune Magazine. 30 (7). Boulder: 69.
- Spike (2010). "Spike's Tactical & Emerson Knives Limited Edition CQC-22 Rifle and Knife Package". Tactical Life.
- Wynne, Marcus (2003). Warrior in the Shadows. New York: Forge. pp. 12–15. ISBN 0-7653-4376-2.
- Wynne, Marcus (2004a). No Other Option. New York: Tor. ISBN 0-8125-4944-9.
- Wynne, Marcus (2004b). Brothers in Arms. New York: Tor. pp. 124, 321. ISBN 0-7653-4691-5.
- Young, Robert (2015). "Announcing Black Belt's 2014 Hall of Fame Winners". Black Belt Magazine. 56 (1). Los Angeles: 62–63.

=== Additional references ===
- Covert, Pat (2007). "The edge and beyond: Emerson knives continues to expand its horizon". American Handgunner. 32 (3): 93.
- Darom, David; Eric Eggly; Francesco Pachi; Paolo Saviolo (April 30, 2008). The Great Collections (Modern Custom Knives). Chartwell Books. ISBN 978-0-7858-2360-5.
- Ewing, Dexter (2007). "Rock-Star Knifemakers Part 1". Blade Magazine. 34 (1): 27.
- Grant, David (2007). Tomahawks: Traditional to Tactical. Boulder, Colorado: Paladin Press. ISBN 978-1-58160-608-9.
- Heavey, Bill (October 27, 2005). "Why Men Love Knives". Field & Stream. Archived from the original on October 11, 2004.
- Kertzman, Joe (June 2001). 2002 sporting knives: folders-tacticals-pocket-fixed-multi-tools-semi-custom-fantasy. Krause Publications. p. 29. ISBN 978-0-87349-266-9.
- Shackleford, Steve (1997). "Cutler of Fortune". Blade Magazine. 29 (10): 60, 73.
- Pushies, Fred (2002). Weapons of Delta Force. Zenith Press. ISBN 978-0-7603-1139-4.
- Searson, Mike (2011). "Hand to Hand, Toe to Toe:Emerson Knives Extreme Close Quarters Combat Course". SWAT Magazine. 12 (2).
- Roos, John G. (2002). "Militarizing Space: One More Giant Step". Armed Forces Journal. 139 (6): 11. "A tactical folding knife by Emerson Knives has been chosen by NASA for the Astronauts of the International Space Station Program and all United States Space Shuttle Missions."
- Sweeney, Patrick (2004). Modern Law Enforcement. California: Krause. pp. 142–143. ISBN 0-87349-659-0.
- Terzuola, Robert (2000). The Tactical Folding Knife: A Study of the Anatomy and Construction of the Liner-Locked Folder. Iola, Wisconsin: Krause Publications. ISBN 0-87341-858-1.
- Warner, Ken (1986). Knives '87 (7 ed.). Iola, Wisconsin: DBI Books Inc. ISBN 978-0-87349-005-4.
- Emerson, Ernest (2009). "10 Warrior Principles for All people to Live by". The Paladin Book of Dangerously Fun Stuff: For Boys Who Never Really Grew Up. Paladin Press. ISBN 978-1-58160-689-8.
- Emerson, Ernest (2009). "How to Sharpen Any Knife". The Paladin Book of Dangerously Fun Stuff: For Boys Who Never Really Grew Up. Paladin Press. ISBN 978-1-58160-689-8.
- Emerson, Ernest (2009). "How to knock someone out with one punch". The Paladin Book of Dangerously Fun Stuff: For Boys Who Never Really Grew Up. Paladin Press. ISBN 978-1-58160-689-8.
- Emerson, Ernest (October 25, 2006). Surviving the Deadly Attack (PDF). Less-Lethal Weapons Conference. The Royal Armouries, Leeds, UK: Janes Information Group.
