= Massad Ayoob =

American firearms and self-defence instructor

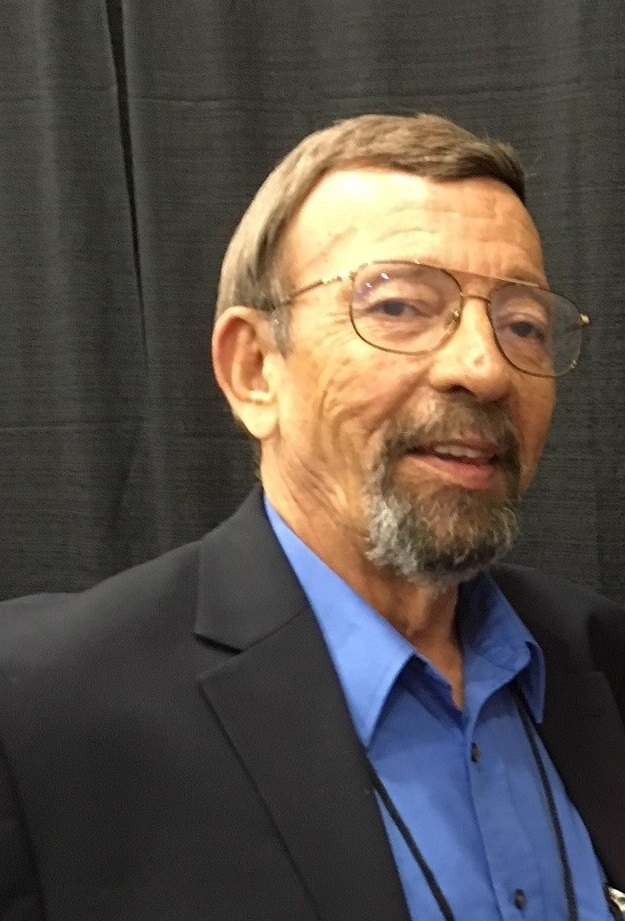
- Ayoob in 2018
- Born: July 20, 1948 (age 78)
- Occupations: Police officer, firearms and self-defense instructor, writer
- Website: massadayoobgroup.com

Massad F. Ayoob (born July 20, 1948) is an American firearms expert, self-defense instructor and security advisor. He has taught police techniques and civilian self-defense to both law enforcement officers and private citizens since 1974. He was the director of the Lethal Force Institute in Concord, New Hampshire, from 1981 to 2009, and now operates his own company. Ayoob has appeared as an expert witness in several trials. He served as a part-time police officer in New Hampshire since 1972 and retired in 2017 with the rank of captain from the Grantham police department in New Hampshire. On September 30, 2020, Ayoob was named president of the Second Amendment Foundation.

== Career ==
Ayoob has authored several books and more than 1,000 articles on firearms, combat techniques, self-defense, and legal issues, and has served in an editorial capacity for Guns Magazine, American Handgunner, Gun Week, Guns & Ammo and Combat Handguns. Since 1995, he has written self-defense and firearms related articles for Backwoods Home Magazine. He has a featured segment on the television show Personal Defense TV, which is broadcast on the Sportsman Channel in the US.

Ayoob has appeared in the courtroom as a testifying police officer, expert witness, and police prosecutor. He testified for the defence in the Luis Alvarez case. Ayoob is believed to be the only non-attorney to serve as Vice Chairman of the Forensic Evidence Committee of the National Association of Criminal Defense Lawyers (NACDL), a position he formerly held. His course for attorneys, titled "The Management of the Lethal Force/Deadly Weapons Case", was, according to Jeffrey Weiner: "the best course for everything you need to know but are never taught in law school."

Ayoob has designed two tactical knives; in 1998 a sheath knife for Master of Defense (currently Blackhawk), and in 2001 a folding knife for Spyderco.

== Personal life ==
Ayoob is of Syrian descent. His grandparents emigrated to North America in the latter part of the 19th century.

== Publications ==
=== Books ===
Title	ISBN	Year of first publication
Armed and Alive		1979
In the Gravest Extreme: The Role of the Firearm in Personal Protection	ISBN 978-0-936279-00-8	1980
The Experts Speak Out: The Police View of Gun Control		1981
The Truth About Self-Protection	ISBN 978-0-936279-13-8	1983
Stressfire. Volume I of Gunfighting for Police: Advanced Tactics and Techniques with Ray Chapman	ISBN 978-0-936279-03-9	1986
Gunproof Your Children/Massad Ayoob's Handgun Primer	ISBN 978-0-936279-05-3	1986
Hit the White Part	ISBN 978-0-936279-01-5	1986
The Semi-Automatic Pistol in Police Service and Self Defense	ISBN 978-0-936279-07-7	1987
Police Survival Shooting (How Close Is Too Close)		1990
Stressfire II: Advanced Combat Shotgun. Volume II of Gunfighting for Police: Advanced Tactics and Techniques	ISBN 978-0-936279-11-4	1992
Effective Defense: The Woman, the Plan, the Gun with Gila May-Hayes	ISBN 978-1-885036-01-8	1994
Ayoob on Firearms	CD collection of 40 articles from Backwoods Home Magazine	1994–2001
Ayoob Files: The Book	ISBN 978-0-936279-16-9	1995
Fundamentals of Modern Police Impact Weapons	ISBN 978-0-398-03748-2	1996
The Complete Book of Handguns		1998–2001
The Gun Digest Book of Combat Handgunnery 5th Edition	ISBN 978-0-87349-485-4	2002
The Gun Digest Book of SIG-Sauer: A Complete Look at SIG Sauer Pistols	ISBN 978-0-87349-755-8	2004
The Gun Digest Book of Beretta Pistols: Function, Accuracy, Performance	ISBN 978-0-87349-998-9	2005
The Gun Digest Book of Combat Handgunnery 6th Edition	ISBN 978-0-89689-525-6	2007
The Gun Digest Book of Concealed Carry	ISBN 978-0-89689-611-6	2008
Greatest Handguns of the World	ISBN 978-1-4402-0825-6	2010
Combat Shooting with Massad Ayoob	ISBN 978-1-4402-1857-6	2011
Greatest Handguns of the World Volume 2	ISBN 978-1-4402-2869-8	2012
Gun Digest Book of Concealed Carry 2nd Edition	ISBN 978-1-4402-3267-1	2012
Gun Safety in the Home	ISBN 978-1-4402-3987-8	2014
Gun Digest Book of SIG-Sauer 2nd Edition	ISBN 978-1-4402-3914-4	2014
Deadly Force: Understanding Your Right to Self Defense	ISBN 978-1-4402-4061-4	2014

=== Videos ===
Title	Year of first publication
LFI Handgun Safety	year unknown
Stressfire Series Part One: Handgun	1986
Stressfire Series Part Two: Shotgun	year unknown
Stressfire Series Part Three: Rifle	year unknown
Judicious Use of Deadly Force	1990
Physio-Psychological Aspects of Violent Encounters	1990
Post Shooting Trauma	1990
Shoot to Live: Gunfight Survival	1994
Cute Lawyer Tricks	1995
Masters of Defense: An Inside Look at the Designs, the Designers, and Their Tactics	1999
Make Ready with Massad Ayoob Home Defense	2011
Make Ready with Massad Ayoob On Concealed Carry	2013
Make Ready with Massad Ayoob Lethal Force FAQ	2013

=== Podcasts ===
Ayoob hosts the ProArms Podcast.

== See also ==
- Jeff Cooper
