= Poking =

Striking using the fingertips

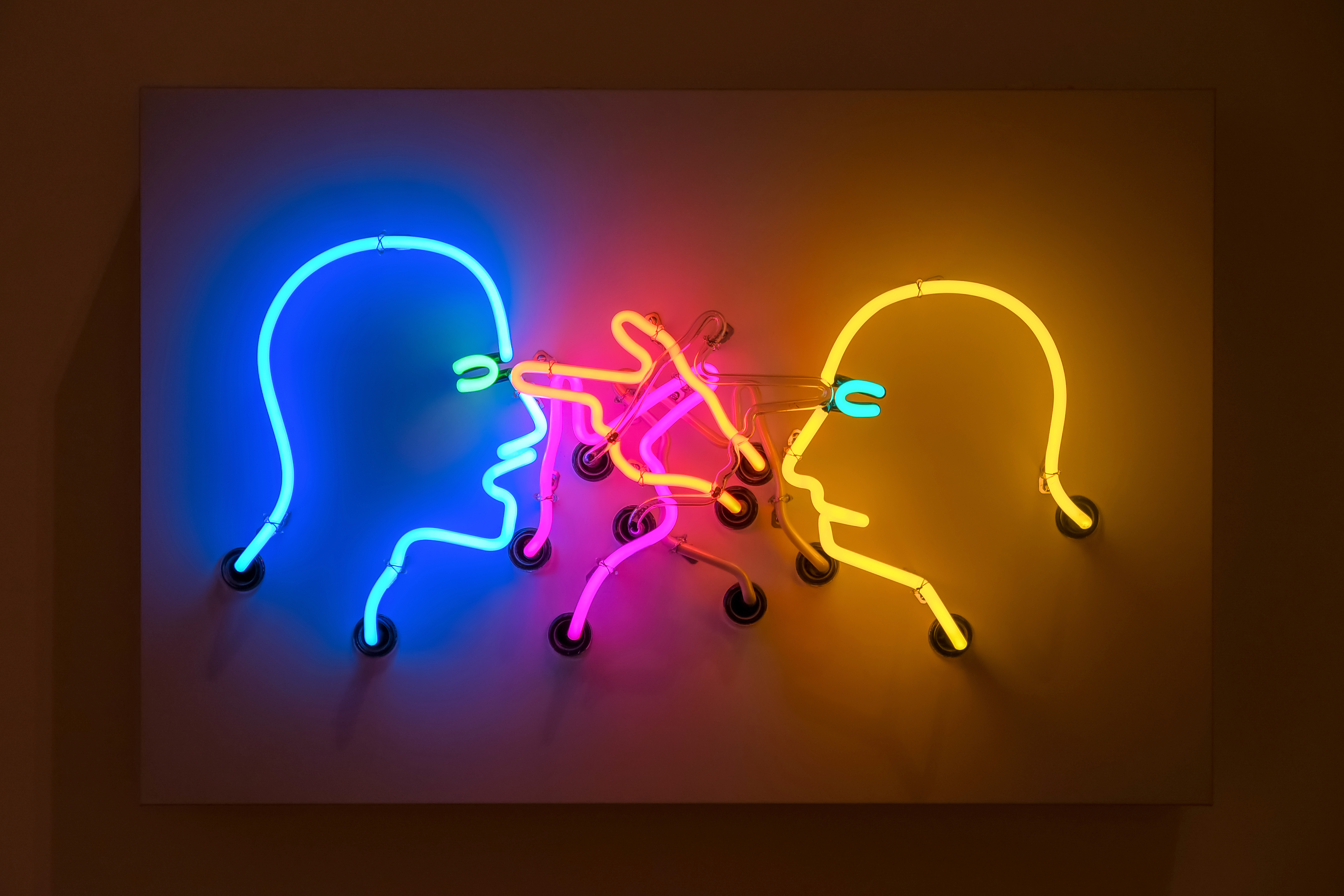
Double Poke in the Eye II, a 1985 sculpture by Bruce Nauman depicting eye-poking

A poke or prod is a blow using the tips of one or more fingers.

== Sports ==
In sporting events, a losing fighter will sometimes break the rules and poke someone in the eye, leading to the fight being ruled "no decision," thus preventing the poker from taking a loss. Some events try to prevent eye poking by having fighters wear gloves with webbing over the fingers.

== Self-defense ==
In a street fight situation, when one's opponent may be trying to inflict serious harm, martial arts expert Kelly McCann advises that the eyes should be a "persistent primary target". An eye poke needs little power to be effective, and it can stop even highly determined attackers. If the hand is kept at an approximately 45° angle to the opponent's face during the strike, there is less risk of hurting ones fingers, and even if they do not connect with the eye, the palm can impact on the opponent's face.

== Comedy ==
The eye poke was a signature move in the slapstick antics of the comedy and vaudeville act The Three Stooges, who mastered the technique. In reality, the Stooges poked each other on the eyebrows to avoid actual injury. The form of attack was well known among children who watched the show.

== Targets ==
=== Eyes ===
An eye poke, eye jab, eye stab, eye strike or poke in the eye is a strike at the eye or eyes of a human or animal. It is typically made with the fingers which may either be forked to jab both eyes or held together, like a bird's beak, to strike with force and protect the fingers from damage. The attack became better known among the public due to its use in comedy; the idea of using it to entertain was likely invented by the vaudeville duo of Joe Weber and Lew Fields.

== See also ==
- eye for an eye
- eye-gouging
- "fingerpoke of doom"
- one inch punch
- physical comedy
- poke (Facebook)

== Bibliography ==
- Vannoy-Rhoades, Cynthia (2000). Conceptual Self Defense. Turtle Press. Page 77. ISBN 1-880336-54-5
