= James Grover =

James or Jim Grover may refer to:

- Jim Grover (martial arts), instructor in World War II combatives and defensive shooting tactics
- James R. Grover Jr. (1919–2012), U.S. Republican politician
