= Smith Enterprise, Inc. =

American manufacturing company

Smith Enterprise, Inc
- Type: Private
- Industry: Defense
- Founded: 1973
- Founder: Ron Smith, Sonja Sommers
- Headquarters: Tempe, Arizona, United States
- Products: Firearms, weapons
- Revenue: ▲
- Owner: Ron Smith, Sonja Sommers
- Number of employees: 20
- Website: www.smithenterprise.com

Smith Enterprise Inc. (SEI) is a firearm and accessory manufacturing facility based in Tempe, Arizona that is known for making flash suppressors, muzzle brakes, sound suppressors, M14 rifles and accessories for M14 rifles.

Smith Enterprise played a key role in the M14 rifle modernization projects for the U.S. military in the early 21st century including the US Navy's Mark 14 Mod 0 rifle.

== History ==
Smith Enterprise was founded as Western Ordnance in 1979 by Ron Smith in Mesa, Arizona and the company made numerous types of rifles, but specialized in M1 Garands and M14s. In 1993, Ron Smith reformed the company as Smith Enterprise and relocated production to Tempe. In 2013 Smith Enterprise was identified as one of a group of firearms manufacturers who have taken a public stance against the gun control movement by publicly stating that they will not sell their products to any government agency in any state that severely restricts its citizens' rights to own firearms. Smith Enterprise has doubled its sales and production numbers during this same time period due to proposed legislation and its impact in social media.

== Vortex Flash Hider ==
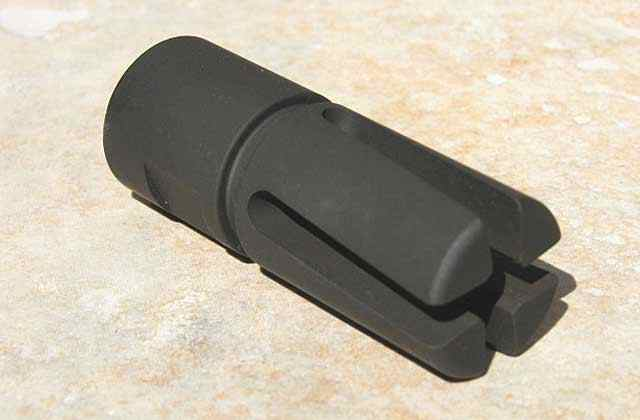
Vortex Flash Hider viewed from the front.

The Vortex Flash Hider is a flash suppressor made by Smith Enterprise and has been called the "most effective flash hider available short of a (sound) suppressor" by writer and gunsmith Patrick Sweeney, when used on an AR-15. The Vortex made for AR-15 type rifles weighs 3 ounces, is 2.25 inches in length and does not require a lock washer for attachment to the barrel.

The Vortex was developed in 1984 and a patent was secured in 1995. The Vortex is somewhat reminiscent of the original “three-prong flash hider” found on the original Vietnam-era M16 rifle. However, the Vortex is more robust and makes use of four solid tines which are closer together than those found on the original and are more closely proportioned . The Vortex is unique in that it is a helical flute design that breaks up the flash at multiple locations and angles. SEI makes the Vortex for M16s, AR-15s, M14s, Steyr AUGs and certain pistols such as the Heckler & Koch USP Tactical Model.

The Vortex Flash Hider has been used on the US Army's SOCCOM M14 and was chosen because it reduces visible flash by 99%.

In 2011 Naval Surface Warfare Center Crane Division adopted the Vortex Flash Hider for use on 50-caliber machine guns and rifles after it was rated the number one suppressor in their test report. The testing performed by CRANE showed that the Vortex maintained a 95% flash reduction threshold through 10,000 rounds of machine gun fire and was proven to not adversely affect normal combat functions, weapon firing or cycling, or interfere with mechanical sights. The Vortex 50 Caliber Flash Eliminator is assigned the NSN code of 1005-01-588-9516 - PN 6021V.

== M14 rifles ==
Since 1980, Smith Enterprise has built and rebuilt numerous M14 rifles for the US Military and the militaries of Colombia, Canada and other nations.

The United States Department of Defense has contracted Smith Enterprise to build and modify M14 rifles for use by soldiers, Marines and sailors in Iraq and Afghanistan. Smith Enterprise was a major player in the M14 rifle modernization projects for various US military units which resulted in the development of the United States Navy Mark 14 Enhanced Battle Rifle. The company's history included originally making forged receivers for M14 rifles and briefly switching to investment casting. Smith stopped making receivers for a few years, but reentered the market with receivers machined from bar stock in 2002.

In 2003 Smith Enterprise Inc. created its version of the M14 Enhanced Battle Rifle known as the MK14 Mod 0, type SEI. The rifle used a medium heavy weight 18.0" barrel and was used as a basis to create the US Navy's Mark 14 Mod 0 with Springfield Armory, Inc. being tasked to supply the necessary machinery in cooperation with the Naval Surface Warfare Center Crane Division. SEI builds an improved M14 gas cylinder as a component of their specialized rifles and a part for the military to upgrade older rifles. The gas cylinder is assigned the NATO Stock Number: NSN 5120-01-512-4959.

The M21A5 designated marksman rifle used by the US Military is built by Smith Enterprise Inc. and is known commercially as the Crazy Horse rifle. The M21A5's metal components are cryogenically treated prior to assembly, which eliminates the need for bedding the stock with fiberglass. Additional upgrades include a completely adjustable trigger system (from 2.5 to 5 lbs) and an extended bolt handle for use in extreme cold environments.

== Sound suppressors ==
Smith Enterprise manufactures a sound suppressor that is made to install over Vortex flash hiders in what the company refers to as a direct-connect method. The current production model is called the Wind Talker sound suppressor and it is the current evolution of the M14 Direct Connect Suppressor.

== Scope rings and scope mounts ==
Smith Enterprise builds 30 mm scope rings and scope mounts primarily for use on AR-15, M16, M1A and M14 rifles. In 2005, Smith was the only company in the United States to produce scope rings and mounts via wire-cut electrical discharge machining (EDM). All of these designs are currently used by the US Military and are assigned a NATO Stock Number.

- 30 mm Heavy Duty Scope Rings, High, 0.865" high for lenses up to 56 mm (NSN 1005-01-535-4385 - PN 7010)
- 30 mm Heavy Duty Scope Rings, Low, 0.264" high for lenses up to 44 mm (NSN 1005-01-535-4374 - PN 7008)
- 30 mm Heavy Duty Scope Rings, Medium, 0.50" high for lenses up to 50 mm (NSN 1005-01-535-4423 - PN 7018)
- 30 mm Heavy Duty Scope Rings, Low, 0.25" high for lenses up to 44 mm (NSN 1005-01-535-4417 - PN 7002)
- 30 mm .50 Cal BMG Scope Rings (NSN 1005-01-535-4395 - PN 7003)
- M14 Scope Mount Assembly, ACOG/MIL STD 1913 (NSN 1005-01-535-4430 - PN 2005)
- M14 Scope Mount (NSN 5855-01-506-5750 - PN 2006)
- M14 Extended Scope Mount (NSN 1005-01-533-8160 - PN 2008)
- M4/M16 Carry Handle MIL STD 1913/STANAG (NSN 1005-01-534-8696 - PN 1037)

== Other tools ==
SEI builds an M4/M16 Armorers Wrench which has been adopted by the United States Marine Corps to work on all of the M4 and M16 rifles in the Corps' inventory. The wrench is assigned the Nato Stock Number: NSN 5120-01-512-4959.

== Bibliography ==
- Poyer, Joe (2006). The M14-Type Rifles: A Shooter's and Collector's Guide, 3rd Edition. Tustin, California: North Cape Publications Inc. ISBN 978-1882391424.
