= Wind Talker sound suppressor =

The Wind Talker sound suppressor is a direct-connect sound suppressor made by Smith Enterprise Inc. for use by the US military on M14 rifles and M4 carbines that utilize a Vortex Flash Hider. It is an improvement over the older M14 Direct Connect (M14 DC) sound suppressor.

== History ==
The M14 is an accurate and reliable rifle, but it has had less than optimum results from being used with a sound suppressor. There are a number of factors which contribute to this. The first pertains to the fine threads on the muzzle which were not intended for attaching and removing different muzzle devices. The second is the rifle's gas system and the diversion of gases from the suppressor toward the face of the shooter.

In 2003 Ron Smith and Richard Smith of Smith Enterprise, Inc. and Dave Fisher of Fisher Enterprises developed and produced an M14 sound suppressor that quickly attached to and detached from the Smith Enterprise, Inc. Vortex flash hider for US troops in the wars in Iraq and Afghanistan. Prior attempts at suppressing the M14 included removing the rifle's existing flash suppressor with an attached sight and sometimes the gas lock which could result in losing parts for the rifle and rendering it ineffective.

The initial version was called the M14 Direct Connect, or M14 DC, and was a factory supplied part of the M14SE/M21A5 and Mk 14 Enhanced Battle Rifle systems. The M14 Direct Connect was unique in that it was the first sound suppressor expressly built for the M14 rifle that could be disassembled in the field for routine maintenance as opposed to returning it to the manufacturer.

In 2006 the body of the suppressor was changed to titanium and this dropped the weight of the suppressor from over 2 lbs to 1.42 lbs. In 2009 Fisher designed an optional locking collar for use on the M1A SOOCOM rifle, which uses a different style of flash suppressor/muzzle brake.

As the war effort began winding down in 2011, Fisher Enterprises and Smith Enterprise ceased their collaboration and Smith made some changes to the M14 DC and renamed the new model as the Wind Talker. These features included a new baffle design, a shortened locking collar made from nitrocarburized stainless steel and revolver cylinder cuts on the coupler which allowed propellant gas to exit just forward of the locking collar.

== Specifications ==
The Wind Talker is constructed with a stainless steel tube and a lightweight version is offered with an aluminum tube. The decibel rating level is 25 dB. The Wind Talker can be mounted to any rifle with either a 7.62 mm or 5.56mm bore diameter as long as it utilizes a Vortex flash hider. The Wind Talker sound suppressor is in the military inventory system as NATO Stock Number: NSN 1005-LLL-997965, utilizing the same NSN number as the M14DC which it replaced.
