= M39 Enhanced Marksman Rifle =

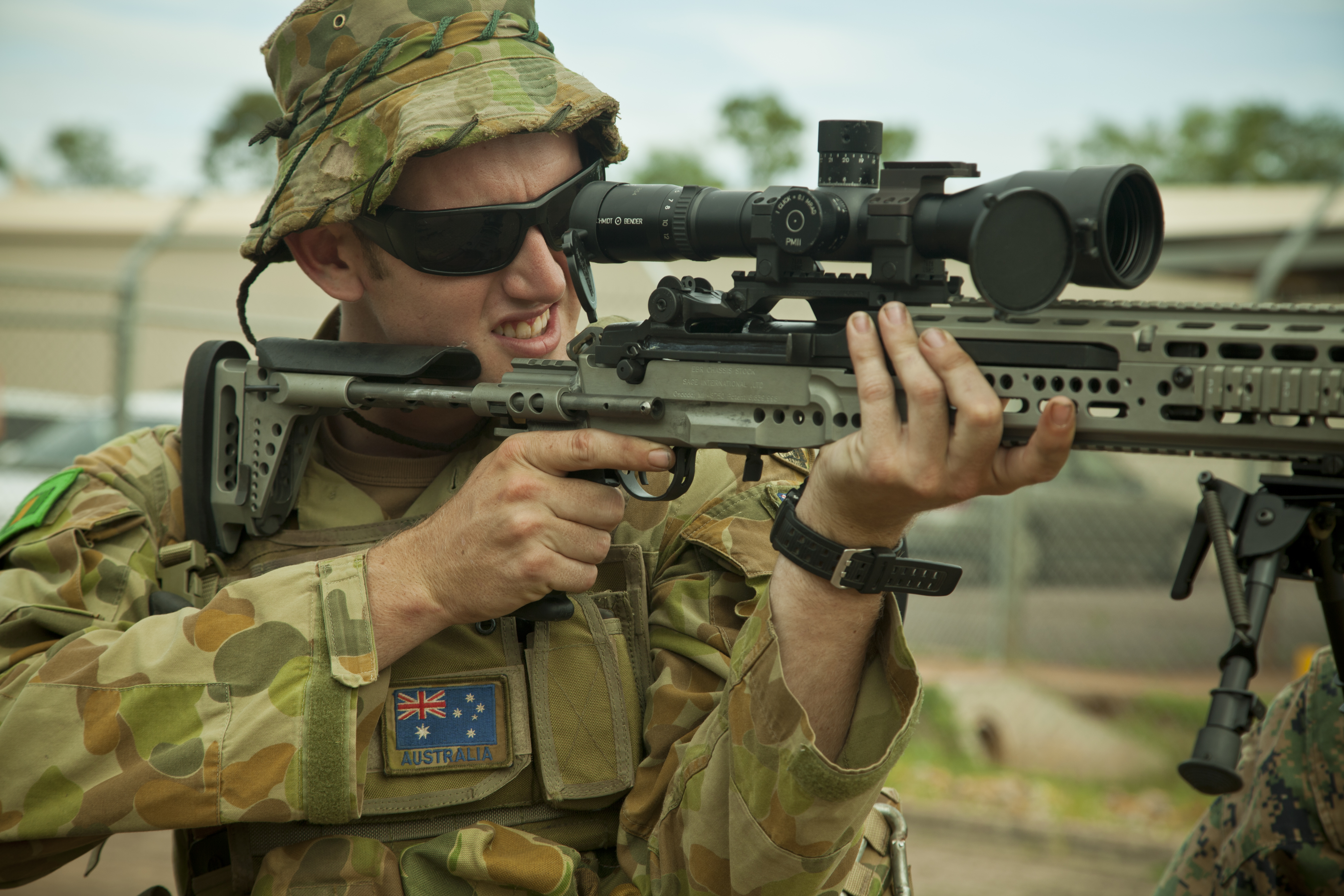
- The M39 Enhanced Marksman Rifle during a combined US-Australian training event.
- Type: Designated marksman rifle
- Place of origin: United States

Service history
- In service: 2008–present
- Used by: United States Marine Corps; United States Army
- Wars: War in Afghanistan (2001–2021); Iraq War

Production history
- Manufacturer: Sage International
- Unit cost: US$3,930.17

Specifications
- Mass: 16.5 lb (7.5 kg)
- Length: 44.2 in (112 cm)
- Barrel length: 22 in (56 cm)
- Cartridge: 7.62×51mm NATO
- Action: Gas-operated, rotating bolt, semi-automatic
- Rate of fire: 60 rounds/min
- Muzzle velocity: 2,837 ft/s (865 m/s)
- Effective firing range: 850 yd (780 m)
- Maximum firing range: 4,075 yd (3,726 m)
- Feed system: 20-round detachable box magazine
- Sights: Iron sights M8541 Scout Sniper Day Scope (telescopic sight)

The M39 Enhanced Marksman Rifle (EMR; formally Rifle, Caliber 7.62 mm, M39 Enhanced Marksman Rifle; NSN 1005-01-553-5196) is a semi-automatic, gas-operated designated marksman rifle chambered for the 7.62×51mm NATO cartridge. It is a modified and accurized version of the M14 rifle used by the United States military, similar to the Mk 14 Enhanced Battle Rifle. It is based on the United States Marine Corps Designated Marksman Rifle (DMR), which it replaced. It is manufactured by Sage International and maintained by the USMC's Precision Weapons Section.

The rifle is currently issued with match-grade M118LR 175-grain long range ammunition. The "basic" EMR (without telescopic sight, magazine, sling, basic issue items, cleaning gear, suppressor and bipod) weighs 13 pounds (5.9 kg) or less.

== History ==
In November 1992, Marine Corps Systems Command drafted a mission needs statement for an enhanced sniper support team weapon (SSTW). It called for a weapon to support the M40A1 sniper rifle in a Scout Sniper team for close-range engagements and to lay down rapid semiautomatic suppressive fire. At the time, the role was filled by the M16A2, which could not mount optics or night vision sights and used M855 5.56×45mm NATO ammunition, which was too inaccurate for the role.

A previous designated marksman weapon effort attempted to use the M14 for the role, but it was not as accurate as bolt-action rifles and could not fit into the Fleet Marine Forces logistics system. The enhanced SSTW had to engage targets out to 600 meters, use ammunition interchangeable with the M40A1, be able to mount a sound suppressor and optics, and be supportable. Even though the M14 was not initially suitable, rifle equipment builders continued to refine it and produced versions as "interim measures". They eventually became a program unto themselves and culminated as the M39 Enhanced Marksman Rifle.

== Specifications ==
There are several differences between the DMR and EMR.

- Stock: the metal stock is adjustable in length and in height to provide a more precise cheek weld. The pistol grip is modified for a better grip.
- Optics: the Picatinny rail allows for the use of any optic compatible with the rail; this includes a large variety of military scopes and imaging devices. The M8541 Scout Sniper Day Scope (SSDS), originally designed for the M40A3, is issued with the rifle as a set.
- Bipod: a Harris S-L bipod is used on the USMC DMR, but a modified version designed to be more durable is used on the EMR.

== Applications ==
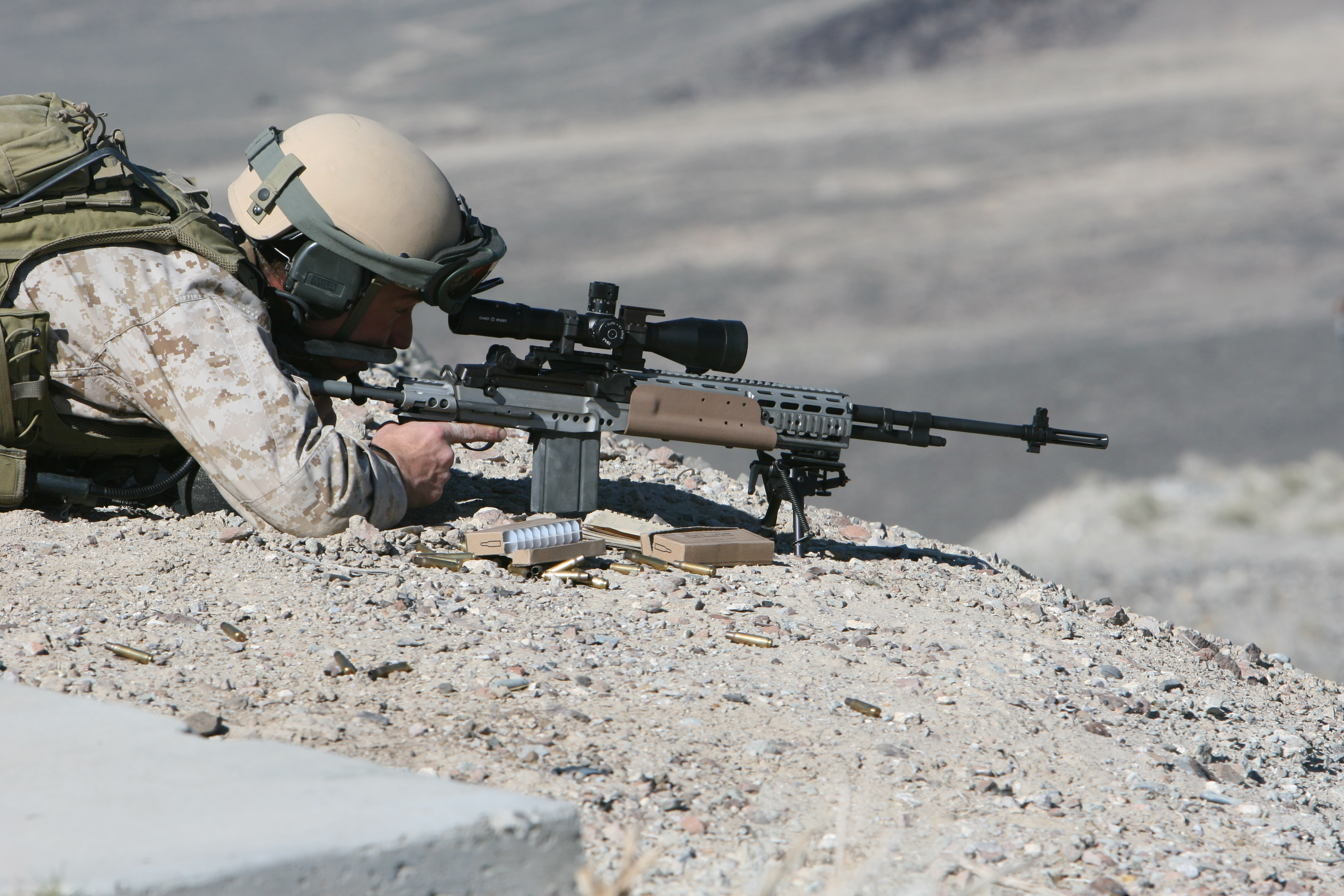
M39 Enhanced Marksman Rifle in use with a U.S. Marine.

The EMR is primarily used by a designated marksman, to provide precision fire for units that do not rate a scout sniper. As a replacement for the DMR, the EMR fills the need for a lightweight, accurate weapon system utilizing a cartridge more powerful than the M16A4's standard 5.56×45mm NATO—the 7.62×51mm NATO. The EMR is also used by Marine scout snipers when the mission requires rapid accurate fire and by Marine Corps explosive ordnance disposal teams.

In early 2012, the Marine Corps began replacing the M39 with the M110 Semi-Automatic Sniper System, originally developed for the U.S. Army, on a one-for-one basis, with the designation of Mk 11 Mod 2. The M110 better fills the requirements of the SSTW, being able to mount suppressors and night vision systems while maintaining zero, and having M16 training and supply commonality.

== Components ==
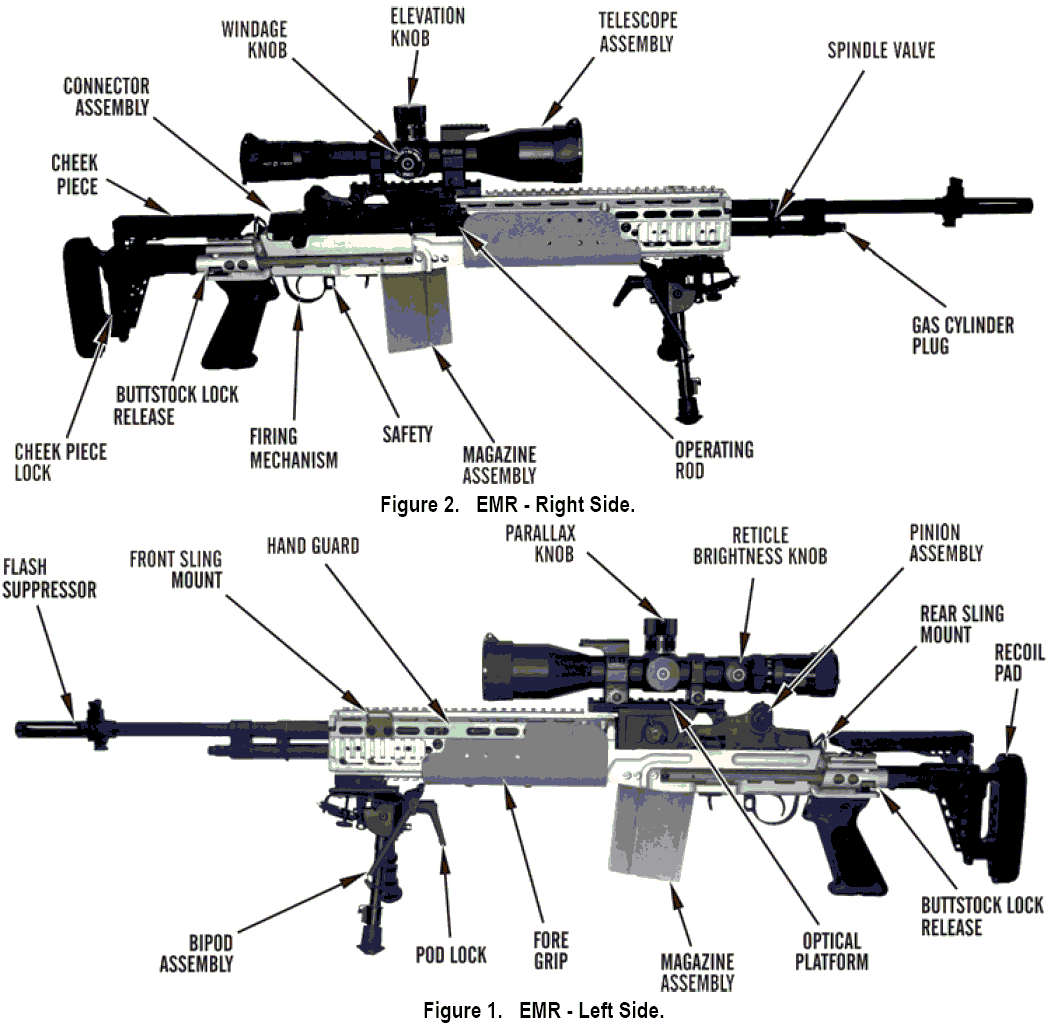
Component view of an EMR

== See also ==
- List of weapons of the United States Marine Corps
- Springfield Armory M1A
