= Phill Hartsfield =

American knifemaker (1931–2010)

- Born: 16 August 1931
- Died: 20 May 2010
- Occupation(s): Knifemaker, martial artist, CEO
- Spouse: Patricia Hartsfield

Phill Hartsfield (August 16, 1931 – May 20, 2010) was a Southern California sword and knifemaker based in Garden Grove who is noted for popularizing the chisel ground blade in the western world. Hartsfield's designs have influenced other knifemakers, primarily Ernest Emerson.

== Early life ==
Hartsfield joined the US Navy at age17 and served as a sonar technician. After serving four years, he was discharged and worked as a television repairman. After six months of working for a repair shop, Hartsfield opened his own repairshop at the age of 22 while making knives part-time. In 1977, he closed his TV repair business and became a full-time knifemaker.

== Knife making ==
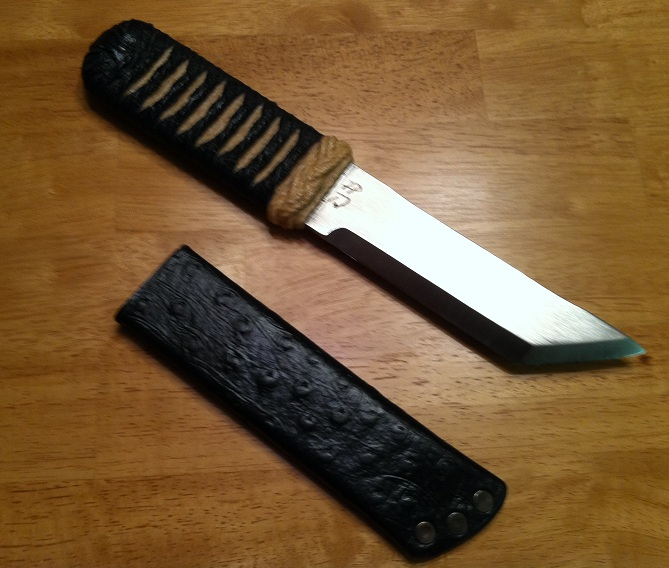
Phill Hartsfield Kwaiken

Hartsfield's blades are Japanese-influenced, each one was hand ground from various kinds of tool steel, including 01 and A2. They are differentially edge hardened to RC 60-61 on the Rockwell scale with the remainder of the blade hardened to 58-59 on the scale to allow for flex during the cut. This strength protected the life of a Special Forces advisor in El Salvador when a Hartsfield knife stopped a 7.62×51mm NATO rifle bullet fired by a guerrilla. Hartsfield's blades were zero-ground, meaning there is no secondary bevel edge on the knife, which allows the knife to cut without parasitic drag.

The majority of Hartsfield's blades are designed as tools with little to no ornamentation. However, Hartsfield makes museum quality pieces, some of which are on display at the Canadian Army Museum at Halifax Citadel as examples of Samurai swords.

Hartsfield built a unique hand-driven grinder, the "Lil Cranky", after his electric grinder had a mishap. While grinding a blade, a piece of metal embedded in the wheel and caused the wheel to explode. After a four-hour surgery and months in recovery, Hartsfield designed his machine and sold them from his shop to other knifemakers.

Hartsfield's knives are used by the US Navy SEALs and the USMC MARSOC teams.

Hartsfield died on May 20, 2010, at his home in Newport Beach, California, after a lengthy battle with brain cancer.
