= Ron Smith (firearms designer) =

American firearms designer

- Born: 8 April 1951 (age 75); Glendale, California, U.S.
- Occupations: Small arms designer, CEO
- Known for: Designer of the Smith Enterprise Inc. Vortex Flash Hider
- Spouse: Sonja Sommers

Ron Smith (born 8 April 1951) is an American small arms designer and President of Smith Enterprise Inc. Smith is most famous for developing the Vortex Flash Hider for use on a variety of small arms and developing the major upgrades and refinements found on the M14 rifle, particularly the United States Navy Mark 14 Enhanced Battle Rifle.

== Early life ==
Smith became a Certified Journeyman in Ordnance and Metallurgy at age 22 in California in the San Francisco Bay Area working at his father's facility in 1972, trained by immigrant German, Austrian, Hungarian, French and Czechoslovak craftsmen and ordnance manufacturers. In 1979 he became co-owner with his father and the company relocated to Mesa, Az and became Western Ordnance International (dba Smith Enterprise). The company produced over 500,000 M16 bolt carriers 60,000 M16 bolts, M14 receivers and building M14 and M16 rifles as well as M1911 handgunss, ANS/PVS5 night vision goggles for Lorton, ITT, and Varo of Garland, Texas.

Smith served in the US Army and the United States Marine Corps for a total of 16 years of active duty. While serving in the Army, Smith was stationed in South Korea as a staff sergeant and chief of a M109A3 Howitzer battery. He was certified with nuclear credentials to man the nuclear M109A3 in preparation for a possible invasion by North Korea.

== Western Ordnance ==
Smith was a partner at Western Ordnance, a firearms manufacturing firm that specialized in rifles such as the M1 Garand and M14. Western Ordnance was founded in 1979 by Smith's father, Richard Smith, in Mesa, Arizona. While at Western Ordnance, Smith was the first person to design and field a commercial flash suppressor. Smith would also invent a sound suppressor that could be rebuilt as opposed to being obsolete after firing a number of rounds.

He developed the first full size double action 1911 on a Series 70 frame for Colt's Manufacturing Company that later became the Colt Double Eagle.

== Smith Enterprise Inc. ==
In 1993, Ron Smith reformed the company as Smith Enterprise, Inc. and relocated production to Tempe, Arizona. The company is known for its Vortex Flash Hider, a proprietary heat treating processes, the Crazy Horse weapons upgrade and making numerous upgrades to the M14 rifle for the US Military; all of which came from Ron Smith's designs.

Ron Smith is the owner of 3 awarded patents and over 10 more initiated patents or patents pending and 5 trademarks in the Sound Suppressor and Flash Hider industry including the following: Vortex Flash Hider, Crazy Horse rifle, Good Iron Muzzle Brake and Wind Talker sound suppressor

== Bibliography ==
- Poyer, Joe (2006). The M14-Type Rifles: A Shooter's and Collector's Guide, 3rd Edition. Tustin, California: North Cape Publications Inc. ISBN 978-1882391424.
