= Crazy Horse rifle =

Crazy Horse rifle (M14SE)
- Type: Designated marksman rifle
- Place of origin: United States

Service history
- In service: 2003–present
- Used by: United States Army, United States Navy

Production history
- Designer: Ron Smith
- Designed: 2003
- Manufacturer: Smith Enterprise Inc.
- Produced: 2003–present

Specifications
- Mass: 5.27 kg (11.6 lb)
- Length: 1,118 mm (44.0 in)
- Barrel length: 560 mm (22 in)
- Cartridge: 7.62×51mm NATO
- Action: Gas-operated, rotating bolt
- Muzzle velocity: 853 m/s (2,800 ft/s)
- Effective firing range: 822 m (899 yd)
- Feed system: 5-, 10-, or 20-round detachable box magazine
- Sights: Front: National Match front blade .062 or hooded Rear: Match-grade hooded aperture with one-half minute adjustments for both windage and elevation. 26 3/4 in sight radius.

The Crazy Horse rifle or M14SE is a semi-automatic designated marksman rifle based on the M14 rifle. It is chambered for the 7.62×51mm NATO cartridge and is built by Smith Enterprise Inc.

== Overview ==
The goal of the Crazy Horse rifle project was to offer current military units a reliable and cost-effective modernization program for Squad Designated Marksmen (SDM) using existing M14 rifles in inventory. The Crazy Horse rifle was designed in conjunction with the Picatinny Arsenal and the Army Infantry School. Although the rifle has many "precision" features built in to make it accurate, it is not a sniper rifle and was designed as a battle rifle to fit the needs of the Army's SDM program.

The Crazy Horse rifle is built by Smith Enterprise Inc. and is used by various units within the US Military as the M21A5 and the M14SE. The Crazy Horse's metal components are cryogenically treated prior to assembly, which eliminates the need for bedding the stock with fiberglass and steel inserts. Additional upgrades include a completely adjustable trigger system (from 2.5 to 5 lbs) and an extended bolt handle for use in extreme cold environments.

The chamber is hand cut using chamber reamers specially designed for the M118LR round. Smith Enterprise Inc. is the only civilian rifle builder who uses these reamers. The gas system is unitized and hardened via Melonite. The gas piston is hard chromed to tolerances to ensure a precision fit within the hardened gas cylinder. Unlike traditional M14 rifles, the front sight is mounted on the gas lock as opposed to the muzzle to allow use of a direct-connect sound suppressor that mounts to the Vortex Flash Hider.

The scope is mounted to the rifle using a SEI scope mount and ring package made via electrical discharge machining (EDM). The scope mount is attached to the rifle's stock and not welded to the receiver.

=== Technical specifications ===
- Action: A M14NM (National Match) action.
- Barrel: A medium heavy barrel, 22” or an optional 18” length, of chrome moly 4140 steel
- Rifling: A right-hand rate of twist of 1 in 10" with 4 lands and grooves.
- Stock: A USGI synthetic stock modified by Smith Enterprise with an attachable SEI cheekpiece.
- Optics: Leupold Mk4 Tactical × scopes.
- Muzzle device: A SEI Direct Connect Vortex Sound Suppressor-capable Flash Suppressor
- Sound Suppressor: Wind Talker sound suppressor
- Bipod: A Smith Enterprise bipod is often attached for stability during prone firing.
- Sling: M1907 sniper/target sling in either leather or synthetic material.
- Finish: Black phosphate.
- Trigger: Adjustable trigger from 2.5 to 5 lbs.
- Sight: SEI Gas Lock Front Sight (hooded)

=== Former users ===
The Crazy Horse rifle was formerly in service with the 2nd Infantry Division of the US Army and the 101st Airborne Division as the M21A5.

== See also ==
- U.S. Marine Corps Designated Marksman Rifle
