= Bill Loëb =

American gun writer

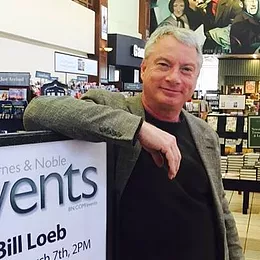
- Bill Loëb at book signing
- Born: Bill Loëb; New Orleans, Louisiana
- Education: University of New Orleans; Louisiana State University
- Occupation: Gun writer
- Notable work: The Custom 1911
- Website: billloeb.com

Bill Loëb is an American gun writer who writes for Gun Digest and Shooting Illustrated. He is also an inventor and real estate consultant. Formerly, he was a talk show host of a program called One on One on KWNX.

== Early life and education ==
Bill Loëb was born in New Orleans, Louisiana to a family which was involved in banking and bonds. Their projects included the Lake Pontchartrain Causeway.

Loëb received his education from University of New Orleans and Louisiana State University.

== Career ==
Loëb began his career in the wine industry, where he worked for twenty years. Starting in retail, he then moved into the wholesaling and importing business. Loëb continues to write wine articles and restaurant reviews.

Wanting to spend more time with his daughter, Briana Loëb, he became a realtor in the Austin, Texas area. He quickly became one of the leading agents, working with builders and investors. Now, Baymoon Properties takes clients on a referral basis.

His gun expertise caused him to be approached by Gun Digest to write the book, The Custom 1911.

Bill co-hosted a radio talk show called One on One on KWNX in Austin, Texas.

In addition to being a firearms expert, Loëb is a women's self-defense instructor and aerosol defense with the RAD Systems Program as well as certified instructor for radKIDS. Other experience includes Active Shooter Survival Training, specifically the outstanding ALICE Program.

As another way of giving back, Loëb helps fight property taxes. One year, he helped homeowners reduce their assessments by over 6 million dollars. In May 2022, he exposed the Hays County Central Appraisal District's illegal practice of using protected real estate data to value properties which sparked an investigation by KXAN. He is also active in local real estate and development issues.

== Personal life ==
Loëb and his wife and stepson live in Dripping Springs, Texas.

== Bibliography ==
- Loeb, Bill. The Custom 1911
- Chip McCormick Passes Away
- Early 1911 Customization
- Reloading the .300 WinMag
- CMC Railed Power Mag
- Wilson Combat 92G Brigadier Tactical Pistol
