= American Handgunner =

- Cover of an American Handgunner issue from January 2001.
- Editor: Tom McHale
- Former editors: Roy Huntington
- Frequency: Bi-monthly
- Circulation: 150,000
- Founded: 1976
- Company: FMG Publications
- Country: United States
- Based in: San Diego, California
- Website: americanhandgunner.com
- ISSN: 0145-4250

American Handgunner was a magazine dedicated to handguns, handgun hunting, competition shooting, reloading, tactical knife and other shooting-related activities in the United States. It was a sister publication to Guns and American Cop. The magazine ceased print publication in 2025, with the November/December 2025 issue being the final print issue.

== Content ==
The magazine primarily offered reviews on guns, ammunition, knives, and shooting gear; as well as gunsmithing tips, historical articles, gun collecting, self-defense and alerts on gun rights.

In addition to those departments, each issue contained a few featured articles and personality profiles of people in the firearms industry as well as press releases of new products.

== Writers ==
Staff writers for American Handgunner include Massad Ayoob, John Taffin, Mike Venturino, Pat Covert, Clint Smith, and J. D. Jones.
