= Emerson Combat Systems =

Form of modern combatives designed by Ernest Emerson

- Emerson Combat Systems
- Focus: Hybrid
- Country of origin: (United States) U.S.
- Creator: Ernest R Emerson
- Parenthood: Jeet Kune Do, Boxing, Shotokan, & Escrima

Emerson Combat Systems is a form of modern combatives designed by Ernest Emerson. The system is based on Emerson's accumulated 35 years of study of martial arts and combat and incorporates empty hand training as well as use of weapons from knives and sticks to rifles and pistols. In the United States, this system is taught to military, law enforcement, and civilians.

== History ==
Emerson Combat Systems was developed as one of numerous eclectic martial systems that arose in the 1980s. Rather than teach individual philosophies and parameters of different fighting styles that he studied such as Jeet Kune Do, Kyokushin, Shotokan, Brazilian Jujitsu, Boxing, and Escrima; Emerson took elements that he thought were useful from those arts and presented them as part of a system.

== Philosophy ==
An important component of Emerson Combat Systems is developing what Emerson calls "the combat mindset". Emerson's courses feature guest speakers from various walks of life such as active and former members of the US Military, former teachers of his such as Richard Bustillo, and authorities on legal aspects such as attorneys and judges. These speakers go into greater depth on the realities of the use of deadly force.

The techniques taught are based on two factors: the human body's physiological response to stress and its reduction to the use of gross motor skills. According to Emerson, the techniques are based upon the physical and instinctual laws that govern the survival instincts and physical function of a human being. For example, when unarmed and attacked with a knife or a stick, the student will drive forward into the attacker's zone, using the outer edges of the arms to protect the body and force the attacker off balance to where the student can gain an advantage.

This system is characterized by training "realistically": protective equipment is worn, and students wear street clothing as opposed to uniforms. Weapon transition skills are taught in advanced classes, including drills where a primary weapon might fail and the student falls back to a secondary weapon. There is a strong emphasis placed on overall physical fitness. Emerson maintains he does not teach a "martial art" encumbered by ritual or sporting aspects but a combatives system where the goal is more than simple self-defense.

Emerson's presumption is to treat all attackers as if they are armed. He breaks down attackers into three such as sociopaths, opportunistic predators, mentally disturbed, etc.

== Regimen ==
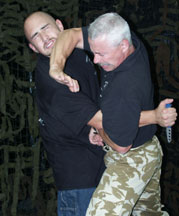
Emerson demonstrates an elbow strike in training

A course in the Emerson Combat Systems begins with various boxing drills. The student will hit a heavy bag while constantly moving for 5 minutes. The goal is to completely exhaust the body of oxygen. At the 5-minute mark, the student hits the heavy bag more aggressively without stopping; the body, depleted of oxygen, works off of adrenaline. From there, the student will perform a similar drill on an MMA dummy or a heavy bag lying on the ground, followed by picking up and slamming the dummy or heavy bag repeatedly for 5 minutes in various jiujitsu throws.

The coursework contains sparring, both armed and unarmed, with various partners to give the student exposure to opponents of various skill and strength levels.

New York Times bestselling author David Morrell underwent training in Emerson Combat Systems as research for several of his books about Special Operations and close quarters combat. The author claims Emerson is "the best manufacturer of tactical knives" as well as a "top level blade instructor for elite military and law-enforcement units". In an interview, Morrell indicated that he injured his collarbone during the training. Emerson has had also trained, not personally, smaller Military Personnel to include a fairly unknown artist of Southern Mississippi, Bobby Gladney, who was serving in the US Army during O.E.F/O.I.F 2003. Gladney stated that the combat system was definitely not easy yet applied to his previous practice, it brought forth a direct approach while engaging threats.

== Training videos ==
- Emerson Combat Systems-Unconventional Edged Weapons Combat I-V DVD
- Ernest Emerson Complete Combat Karambit Knife DVD
