= Offgrid =

RECOIL OFFGRID
- Editorial Content Director: Patrick Diedrich
- Former editors: Patrick McCarthy, Tom Marshall, Patrick Vuong
- Staff writers: Nicholas Italiano
- Categories: Survival, Preparedness, Self-Reliance
- Frequency: Bi-monthly
- Publisher: Glen Castle
- Founded: 2013
- First issue: 2013
- Company: CMG West LLC
- Country: United States
- Based in: Appleton, Wisconsin
- Language: English
- Website: offgridweb.com

RECOIL OFFGRID is an American bimonthly magazine covering disaster preparedness and survival, published by CMG West, LLC. It is a sister publication to RECOIL, and approaches emergency scenarios largely from an urban dweller's perspective.

== Content ==
The magazine publishes how-to articles on survival skills, gear and equipment reviews, shelter and tool construction, and profiles of preparedness practitioners. Each issue is organized around a central theme that ties the featured articles together. Recurring departments cover first aid, self-defense, knives and packs, and outdoor travel.

== History ==
Offgrid was founded in 2013 under The Enthusiast Network (formerly Source Interlink, later TEN). The title later moved with its sister brand RECOIL through subsequent ownership changes, and is currently published by CMG West, LLC.
