= Jim Grover (martial arts) =

American martial artist

Kelly McCann, also known as Jim Grover (as an author while he was still on active duty and operational but writing for Guns & Ammo magazine and publishing Combatives and shooting videos for Paladin Press). He has been a long time columnist for Black Belt Magazine as well. McCann is a former Major in the US Marine Corps and the founder and former owner of Crucible Security Specialists located in Fredericksburg, Virginia. Crucible is a GSA approved facility which provides high-risk environment training and security services to the US Government and armed forces. McCann is a writer and has appeared as a commentator on US Cable News Channels such as Fox and CNN amassing over 1,000 on—air interviews. In 2012 McCann created the Kembativz Brand, LLC with Michelle Washington. The company focuses on teaching individual protective measures to civilians and corporate clients. Kembativz Brand still includes several government agencies and law enforcement organizations among their clients. Kembativz Brand has conducted training across the US and internationally for various groups, agencies, allied armed forces, corporations and LEO's. McCann also co-owns and operates Renegade Combat Sports with Michelle Washington and their fighters compete regionally and nationally. Renegade Combat Sports holds four Championship belts in the Bantamweight and Heavyweight divisions. McCann was inducted into the Black Belt Hall of Fame in 2008.

== Background ==
While serving in the United States Marine Corps, McCann was responsible for standardizing all hostage recovery tactics and equipment, training all counter-terrorist forces and served as both a counter-narcotics officer and special missions officer.

McCann's techniques are drawn from his own experience in the Marine Corps as well as many other mentors, notable (historic) instructors and operationally developed tactics, techniques and procedures. McCann holds a Master Instructor rating in combative skills and is a subject-matter expert in close combat for the U.S. Marine Corps; close quarters battle for the Office of Naval Research; protective services for the United States Department of State; apprehension avoidance for the Joint Personal Recovery Agency, and high-risk environment tactics, techniques and procedures for the Department of Defense. He assisted local, state and federal law enforcement agencies in developing raid techniques for use against domestic hate groups prevalent in the Midwest from 1984 to 1986 while assigned to Omaha, Nebraska. His contributions earned him police commendations and he was inducted into the Governor's Great Navy of the State of Nebraska for service and assistance to law enforcement by Senator Bob Kerrey.

McCann was prominently featured in an article for Esquire magazine written by Tucker Carlson, whom he escorted through Iraq after the 2003 invasion. McCann was featured on the cover of the June 2008 issue of Black Belt Magazine in a two part article continued in the July issue and was voted Black Belt Magazine's "Self-Defense Instructor of the Year" for 2008. In 2010 Black Belt Magazine began running a monthly column written by McCann titled, "Mil-Spec", which explores various aspects of Combatives detailing mind set, physical skills, personal security and awareness and avoidance skills.

McCann previously wrote the “Personal Security” column for Guns & Ammo magazine for 8 years and created over 25 instructional videos for Paladin Press.

McCann made over 1,000 appearances as a commentator on CNN, MSNBC, and Fox News. McCann has developed four knife designs, one with Blackhawk Masters of Defense known as the Crucible II. The other design was unveiled in January 2011, at the SHOT (Shooting, Hunting, Outdoor Trade) Show in Las Vegas, NV, in collaboration with Ernest Emerson, the model is known as the Canis. The Canis is now a Spyderco production knife. McCann is currently Renegade Combat Sports Kru (head coach) and a licensed corner/cut man.

== Legacy ==
McCann trained many security professionals who continue to teach his precepts. The most prominent among these is Clint Seltzer who currently serves as the Rangemaster of the Atlantic County Police Academy in New Jersey. Seltzer has adapted the McCann's techniques and combined them with his experiences in Bosnia for a new generation of law enforcement professionals. Seltzer frequently cites McCann as the source of his training philosophies and techniques which remain unchanged since the 1980's.

== Videos ==
- Collapsible Baton Tactics
- Combative Pistol
- Combatives for Street Survival
- Inside the Crucible Vol. 1-5
- Jim Grover's Defensive Shooting
- Jim Grover's Situational Self-Offense
- Kelly McCann's Tactical Carbine
- Living Safely in Dangerous Times
- Minimum Damage, Maximum Effect
- Kembativz Remote Learning Program

== Books and publications ==
- Combatives for Street Survival: Hard-Core Countermeasures for High-Risk Situations
- Street Smarts, Firearms, and Personal Security
- Articles Published in Guns & Ammo magazine from 1996–2000
- http://www.blackbeltmag.com/category/kelly-mccann/
