= Craig Boddington =

American hunter and author (born 1952)

Craig Boddington is a professional hunter, TV show host, author and former US Marine.

== Biography ==
Craig Boddington was born in Kansas, U.S.A., in 1952. As a teenager, when not involved with hunting and shooting, he spent a lot of time pursuing Boy Scout activities. Boddington attended the University of Kansas graduating with an English degree and a regular commission in the United States Marine Corps.

He retired from the USMC Reserves in 2005 with the rank of colonel after service in the Gulf War in 1991 and Kuwait in 2001.

== Career ==
In 1979, he joined Petersen Publishing Company, where he served as associate editor for Guns & Ammo, Editor for Guns & Ammo Speciality Publications, Field Editor for American Blade,

His current position with Intermedia Outdoors (formerly Petersen's) is Executive Field Editor, Intermedia Outdoor Group, including Guns & Ammo, Petersen's Hunting, and RifleShooter. He is a member of Gander Mountain's Elite Pro-Staff and also serves as a consultant to SureFire LLC.

He is the host of Hornady's The Boddington Experience on the Sportsman Channel.
