= Guns & Ammo =

Magazine

- Editor: Eric R. Poole (2013–present)
- Contributors: Mike Anschuetz Tom Beckstrand; Craig Boddington; Dave Emary; Mark Fingar; Brad Fitzpatrick; Robert W. Hunnicutt; Garry James; Joseph Kurtenbach; Kyle Lamb; Lukas Lamb; Richard Nance; Alfredo Rico; Phil Schreier; Jeremy Stafford Keith Wood
- Former editors: Jim Bequette (2009–2013) Richard Venola; Scott Rupp; Lee Hoots; Garry James; Kevin Steele (1994–1997); E. G. "Red" Bell (1985–1994); Howard French (1974–1985); George Martin (1967–1974); Mike Kessee (1965–1967); Buzz Fawcett (1964–1965); Tom Siatos (1959–1964) Ken Bayless (1958–1959)
- Categories: Firearms, Outdoors, Sports
- Frequency: Monthly
- Circulation: 420,000 (print)
- Publisher: Chris Agnes
- First issue: 1958; 68 years ago
- Company: Kroenke Sports & Entertainment
- Country: United States
- Based in: Peoria, Illinois
- Language: English
- Website: www.gunsandammo.com
- ISSN: 0017-5684
- OCLC: 59807780

Guns & Ammo is a magazine dedicated to firearms, hunting, competitive shooting, reloading, and other shooting-related activities in the United States.

== Content and Circulation ==
The magazine offers reviews on firearms, ammunition, optics and shooting gear. Also included are historical articles, gun collecting, self-defense features and celebrity interviews. In addition to monthly department columns on specific topics, each issue contains several featured articles and profiles of the firearms industry, as well as technical evaluations and new products.

Guns & Ammo also publishes news and information relating to gun politics. As one journalist has stated: "Politics is implicit in cover-story headlines (“Ready to fight”) and explicit in the “politics” section of the Guns & Ammo website." Its annual assessment of "The Best States for Gun Owners" analyzes each U.S. state's laws, court decisions and positions on "stand your ground" and "castle doctrine" issues.

Guns & Ammo is published on a monthly basis. Its annual circulation is 5.3 million copies. 97% of readers are male; readers' average income is estimated at $102,000.

== History ==
Guns & Ammo was founded by Robert E. Petersen in 1958 and has featured famed gunwriters such as P.O. Ackley, Craig Boddington, Jeff Cooper, Garry James, Bill Jordan, Elmer Keith, Bob Milek, Patrick Sweeney, Col. Townsend Whelen and John Wooters. Charlton Heston, former president of the National Rifle Association of America authored a gun rights column for the magazine titled "From the Capitol" until 2007.

== Staff ==
Currently, Guns & Ammo magazine carries columns written by Eric R. Poole (Editorial), Garry James (Gun Room), Richard Nance (Gun Tech), Jeremy Stafford (Handgunning), Tom Beckstrand (Rifles & Glass), retired SGM Kyle E. Lamb (Lock, Stock & Barrel), Dave Emary (Bullet Board) and Keith Wood (Spent Cases).

The magazine was involved in controversy over the dismissal of one of its writers, Dick Metcalf, in 2014. According to The New York Times, an article by Metcalf took a stance on gun laws that prompted two major gun manufacturers to state that they would no longer do business with Guns & Ammo if Metcalf continued to work there. Among other things, Metcalf's article stated: "The fact is, all constitutional rights are regulated, always have been, and need to be." Metcalf was terminated soon after.

In 2012 Richard Venola, the magazine's editor from 2007 to 2009, was arrested for shooting and killing a friend who was reportedly visiting his home. The weapon was said to be a "high-caliber rifle." Venola was charged with second degree murder, but two separate trials resulted in deadlocked juries. Venola died in 2021.
