= Guns (magazine) =

American firearms magazine

- Editor: Brent Wheat
- Frequency: Monthly
- Circulation: 1.26 million
- Publisher: FMG Publications
- First issue: 1955
- Company: FMG Publications
- Country: United States
- Based in: Escondido, California
- Website: www.gunsmagazine.com
- OCLC: 60617016

Guns was a magazine dedicated to firearms, hunting, competition shooting, reloading, and other shooting-related activities in the United States. First published in 1955, it was one of the oldest periodicals about firearms in continuous publication in the United States. The magazine ceased print publication in 2025, with the November 2025 issue being the final print issue.

The magazine primarily offered reviews on guns, ammunition, and shooting gear; as well as gunsmithing tips, historical articles, gun collecting, self-defense, and alerts on gun rights. In addition to those departments, each issue contained a few featured articles and personality profiles of people in the firearms industry as well as press releases of new products.
