= Mk 14 Enhanced Battle Rifle =

American selective fire military designated marksman rifle

Mk 14 EBR
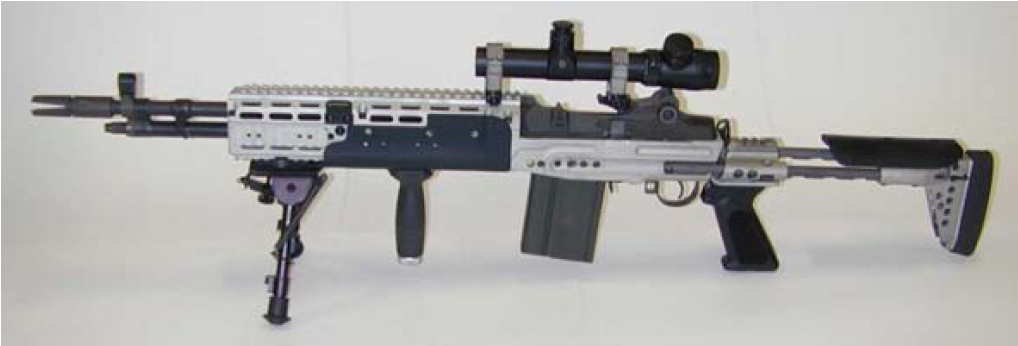
- Mk 14 Enhanced Battle Rifle
- Type: Designated marksman rifle Chassis base variant of M14 Battle rifle
- Place of origin: United States

Service history
- In service: 2002–present
- Used by: See Users
- Wars: War in Afghanistan (2001–2021); Iraq War; Syrian Civil War; War in Iraq (2013–2017); Russo-Ukrainian War

Production history
- Designer: Mike Rock and Jim Ribordy (Original); Smith Enterprise, Inc. (Current)
- Designed: 2001
- Manufacturer: Naval Surface Warfare Center Crane Division; Smith Enterprise Inc. Sage International

Specifications
- Mass: 11.24 lb (5.1 kg)
- Length: 35 in (889 mm)
- Barrel length: 18 in (457 mm) (Mod 0, Mod 1); 22 in (558.8 mm) (Mod 2, EBR-RI)
- Cartridge: 7.62×51mm NATO
- Action: Gas-operated, rotating bolt
- Rate of fire: 700–750 rounds/min
- Muzzle velocity: 853 m/s (2,800 ft/s)
- Effective firing range: 700 m (770 yd)
- Feed system: 10- or 20-round detachable box magazine
- Sights: Modified M14 iron sights, normally used with a magnifying scope

The Mk 14 Enhanced Battle Rifle (EBR) is an American military designated marksman rifle and a modernized/tactical chassis-based variant of the select-fire M14 battle rifle chambered for the 7.62×51mm NATO cartridge, which is originally built for use with units of United States Special Operations Command, such as the United States Navy SEALs, Delta Force, and task specific Green Berets ODA teams/units.

== History ==
Development began in 2000 with a request by the United States Navy SEALs for a more compact M14 battle rifle. A few prototype stocks were made that same year. In 2001, Mike Rock Rifle Barrels was the only barrel maker asked by United States Special Operations Command to participate in a SOPMOD conference to create what would become the Mk 14 MOD 0 EBR, which included a collapsible stock for the new rifle and an aluminum body with telescopic rails. Mike Rock collaborated with engineer Jim Ribordy to make the prototype. Tests showed that their rifle was effective, but had excessive noise.

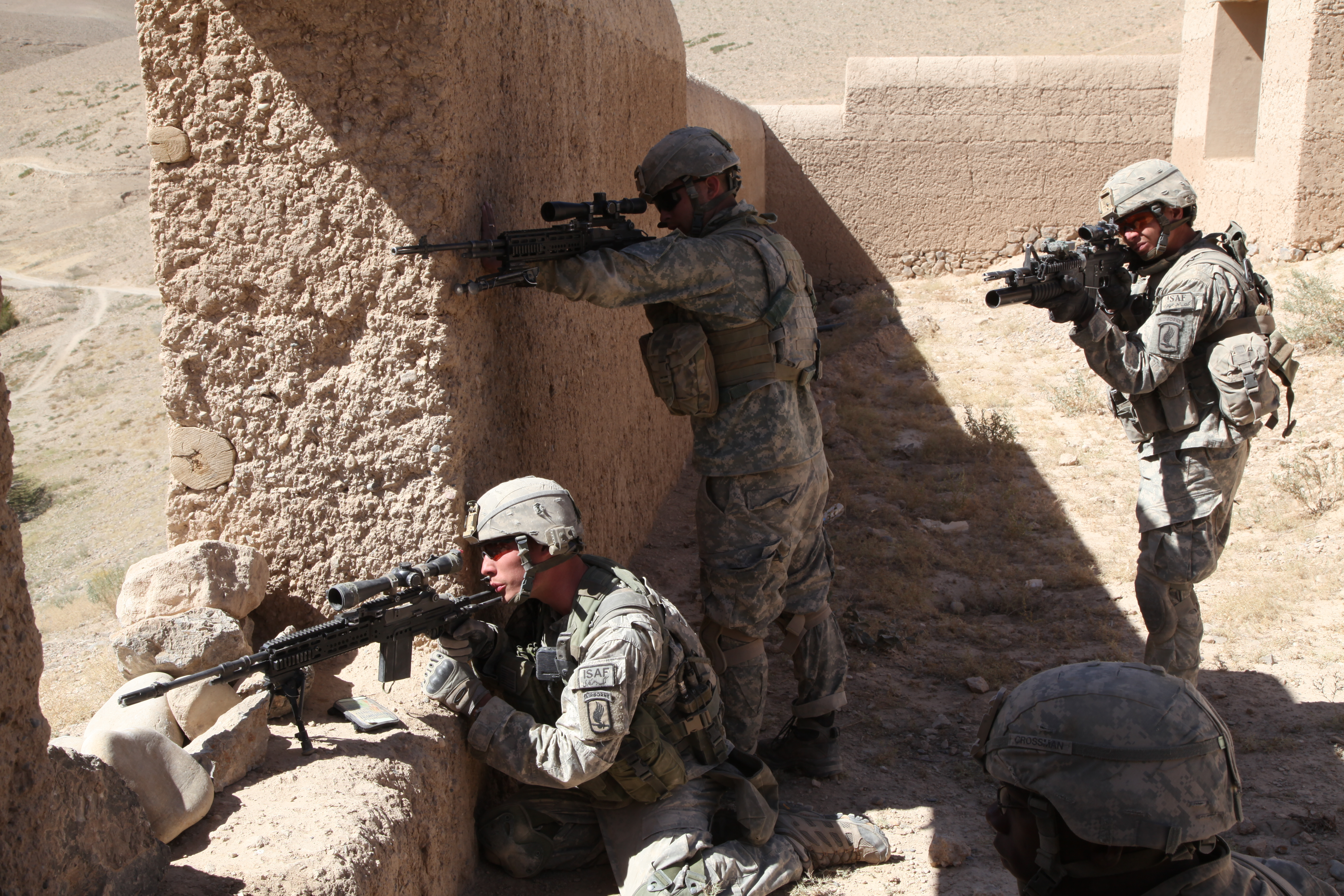
U.S. Army service in Afghanistan with an M14 EBR-RI, September 2010

In 2003, Ron Smith and Smith Enterprise, Inc. created their own version of the M14 EBR (MK14 SEI), which used a medium heavy weight 457 mm (18.0") barrel and was more widely favored than the rifle made by Rock and Ribordy. The Smith Enterprise-based MK14 was then used as a basis for the Mk 14 MOD 0 with Springfield Armory, Inc. being tasked to supply the necessary machinery needed to create the rifle in cooperation with the Naval Surface Warfare Center Crane Division.

United States Navy SEALs were the first to be armed with the EBR in 2004, followed by the U.S. Coast Guard. The U.S. Army also uses the M14 EBR-RI, being created and updated by the Weapons Product Support Integration Directorate of the TACOM Life Cycle Management Command at the Keith L. Ware Test Facility in Rock Island Arsenal, Illinois; having fielded approximately 5,000 units by mid-2010.

In early 2017, the Army began writing a new requirement for an SDM rifle (SDMR) for combat platoons and squads. Although the Army has been using the M14 EBR since 2009, they had to be turned in when returning from theater, and it was heavy, almost 15 lb (6.8 kg) unloaded. A new marksman rifle will equip each combat arms squad weighing about 11 lb (5.0 kg) firing standard M80A1 7.62 mm rounds fitted with a rifle optic rather than a telescopic sight. In March 2018, the Army announced that a version of the HK G28, which had already been selected to replace the M110 SASS, would be issued as the service's standard SDMR. Issuing a 7.62 mm SDMR is meant to increase individual squads' ability to defeat enemy body armor that standard 5.56×45mm rounds cannot penetrate. Fielding was planned to start in late 2018.

== Design details ==
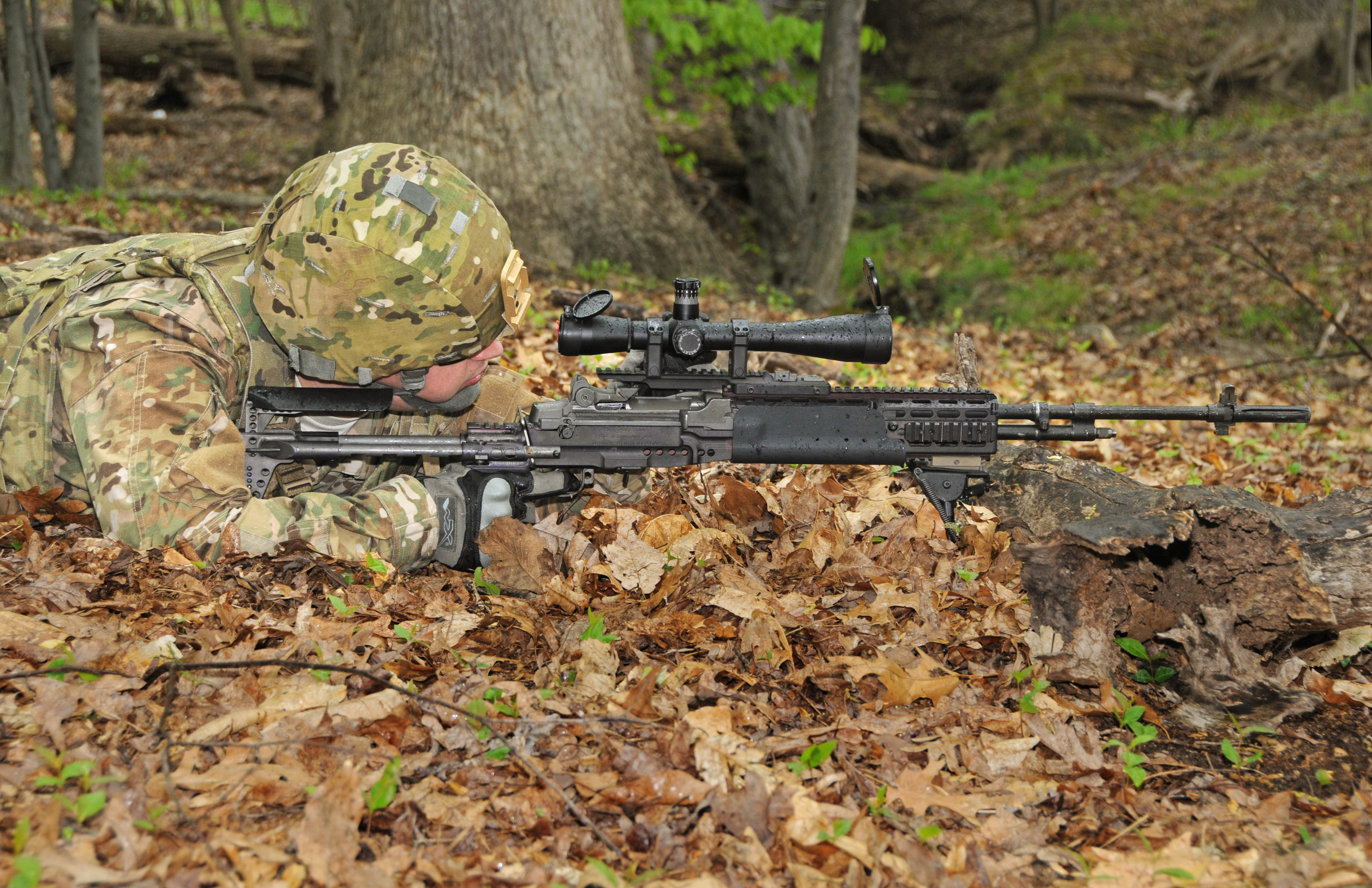
United States Army's Program Executive Officer training with the M14 EBR-RI

This rifle upgrades the standard M14 action and replaces the standard 22.0-inch (560 mm) barrel with an 18.0-inch (460 mm) barrel bolted onto a telescoping chassis stock system with a pistol grip, a different front sight, Harris bipod, four Picatinny accessory rails (which surround the barrel), and a more effective flash hider in place of the standard lugged USGI flash suppressor. A paddle-type bolt stop similar to that of the M4 carbine is used on the rifle. The EBR chassis system stock is made up entirely of lightweight aircraft alloy.

A Kydex hand guard and M68 CCO are also added, though they are almost always replaced with a vertical foregrip and magnifying scope for better handling and for use in a designated marksman role. A Wind Talker suppressor can be mounted on the DC Vortex flash hider, though the U.S. military did not adopt one to active service.

Sage International had some involvement in the decision of whether to invest approximately $120,000 in an injection mold incorporating rail attachments into the design or machine the replacement stock from a solid billet of aluminum. The latter option was selected, which was then shown at the SHOT Show in Orlando in 2003.

The Mk 14 has been criticised for being too heavy, at 14 pounds (6.4 kg) when loaded with a 20-round magazine, with most of this weight being at the front of the rifle, making it difficult to aim.

=== Configurations ===
Several configurations are available on the Mk 14 MOD 0 EBR, including the attachment of an AN/PVS-4 night vision scope. Others had included the capability of adding two different scopes or sights on the Picatinny rails, for more precision or zoom level.

== Variants ==
=== Mk 14 MOD 0 ===
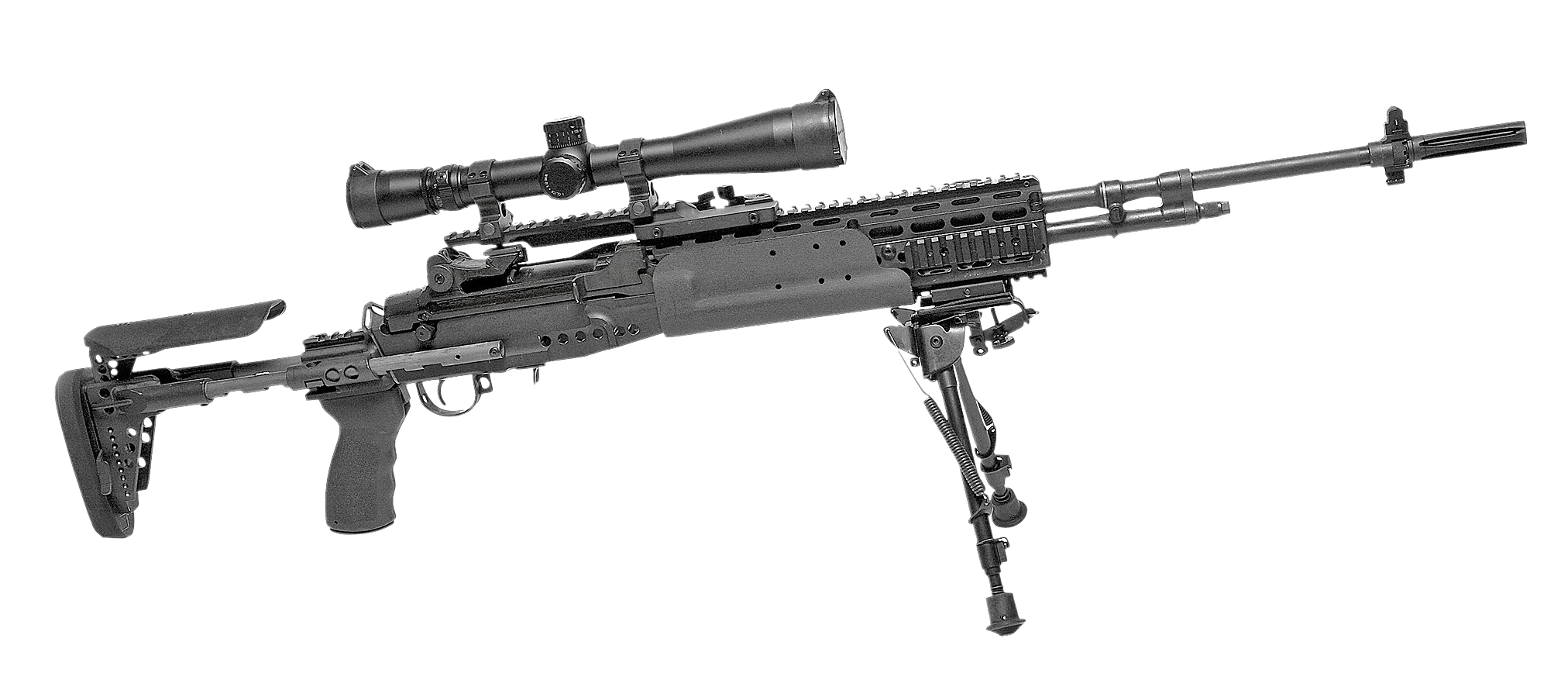
M14 EBR-RI with a telescopic sight

First fielded in 2013, the Mod 0 replaces the M14's stock and handguard, and the operating rod has been redesigned, connecting the barrel to the stock. Designed for use by the U.S. Navy and Marine Corps, its parts are coated with manganese phosphate to help resist corrosion.

=== Mk 14 MOD 1 ===
The Mod 1 variant is a CQB variant of the Mk 14. It has its battle rifle features featuring the EBR chassis with small hand guard and tube extension with a Magpul CTR stock (with the cheek riser), which were developed at the Naval Surface Warfare Center Crane Division in 2006.

=== Mk 14 EBR MOD 2 ===
This extremely rare prototype variant of the Mk 14 was made by taking M14 SSR (Sniper Security Rifle) barreled actions in Navy possession and fitting them into a prototype chassis. It thus has the locked fire selector and 22" precision barrel of the SSR. The chassis, made only in Navy Seal Grey, uses a unique buffer tube adapter (angled lower than that of the Mod 1) fitted with a Magpul PRS 2 Buttstock. Due to its greater accuracy/range, it was given to the Maritime Expeditionary Security Force for providing overwatch for VBSS teams. Sources suggest a range of 50-250 ever made.

=== M14 EBR-RI ===
Just like the Mod 0, it has the Sage EBR chassis, but it retained the M14 barrel length as the same thing mentioned from the Mod 2. This variant is adopted by Delta Force, US Marines (as a concept development to make the M39 EMR), US Army & US Coast Guard (under the name M14T), while in use by the Navy SEAL.

=== M39 Enhanced Marksman Rifle ===
The M39 Enhanced Marksman Rifle began development around 2006 at the request of Marine Corps Systems Command, who wanted a versatile semi-automatic rifle that could operate alongside the M40A5. It entered service in 2008, replacing the standard M14 DMR in Marine Corps usage. The M39 EMR generally features a lighter-color Navy Seal Grey chassis.

Variants
Model	Barrel Length	Fire Selector	Stock	Chassis Coloration	Primary Users
Mk14 EBR Mod 0	18"	Unlocked	Collapsible	Black or Navy Seal Grey	Navy SEALs
Mk14 EBR Mod 1	18"	Unlocked	Buffer Tube style	Black or Navy Seal Grey	Navy SEALs
Mk14 EBR Mod 2	22"	Locked	Magpul PRS 2 on custom low-angled adapter	Navy Seal Grey	Navy MESF
M14 EBR-RI	22"	Locked	Collapsible	Black	US Army
M39 Enhanced Marksman Rifle	22"	Locked	Collapsible	Navy Seal Grey	USMC

== Contractors ==
=== Military ===
While the Naval Surface Warfare Center Crane Division creates the military Mk 14 Mod 0 and Mod 1 rifles, Sage International was contracted to provide the rifle's chassis-type stock.

=== Civilian ===
The MK14 is available to civilian sales sold as a full rifle or a chassis for the M14 and M1A, as Sage International produced the chassis for civilians to make clones of the Mk 14.

One of the civilian versions is created by Smith Enterprise Inc, known as the MK14 SEI. The Sage EBR chassis stock is available in a carbine variant known as the M14ALCS/CV. The carbine variant is also known as the MK14 SEI Mod 1.

Fulton Armory manufactures a clone of the EBR chassis.

Troy Industries has created a replica of the EBR's modular system made by Naval Surface Warfare Center Crane Division called the Troy Modular Chassis System (MCS). The MCS can be used by mounting any functioning M1A or M14 rifle on it.

Philippine arms company FERFRANS has created their version of the Mk 14 Mod 0 called the FERFRANS SOPMOD M14/M1A Enhanced Battle Rifle, which uses a Sage International M14/M1A EBR Tactical Stock System aluminum chassis, an M4 buttstock, and a GRSC M4-62 General Purpose Combat Recticle.

== Users ==
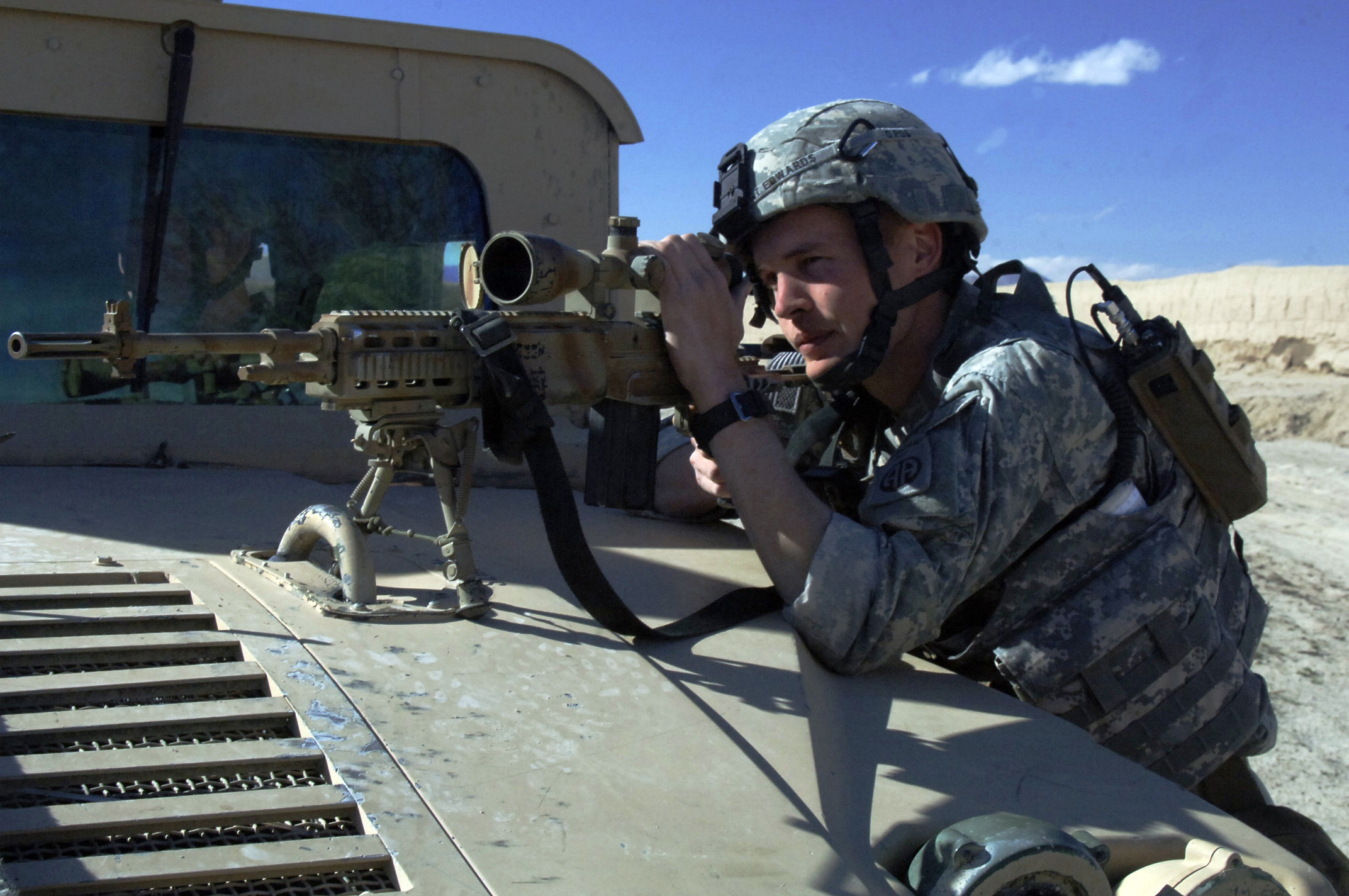
A U.S. Army sergeant with the M14 EBR-RI in Afghanistan, 2007

- Australia: Used by the Special Air Service Regiment in anti-Taliban operations. One used by Corporal Ben Roberts-Smith in October 2010 to provide sniper cover for his SASR teammates.
- Greece: Used by Special Forces. Donated by US Army.
- Iraq: Iraqi Counter Terrorism Service
- Philippines: Philippine National Police Special Action Force - Crisis Response Group. Built by Ferfrans from existing M14 rifles using Sage International M14/M1A EBR Tactical Stock System aluminum chassis but with an M4 buttstock, delivered in 2008.
- United States: Used in the wars in Iraq and Afghanistan

=== Non-state actors ===
- Free Syrian Army
- Islamic State
