= Patrick Sweeney (gunsmith) =

American gunsmith

- Born: Patrick Sweeney
- Occupations: gunsmith, author, firearms instructor
- Known for: writing, gunsmithing

Patrick Sweeney is a retired American gunsmith originally from Detroit, Michigan. According to an interview with Shotgun World magazine, he is a well-known author in the field of gunsmithing. Retired from gunsmithing, he writes full-time. He teaches law enforcement classes on the patrol rifle, and gunsmithing the AR-15.

In addition to writing books, he was the Handguns Editor of Guns & Ammo magazine from 2007 through 2017. He was co-host of Handguns in its inaugural season, and has been a contributor to Guns & Ammo TV since 2007.

== Publications ==
- Gunsmithing: Pistols and Revolvers (1st edition 1998, expanded 2nd edition 2004, 3rd edition 2009, 4th edition 2015)
- Gunsmithing: Rifles (1st edition 1999, 9th edition 2019)
- Gunsmithing: Shotguns (2000)
- The Gun Digest Book of the 1911: A Complete Look at the Use, Care & Repair of the 1911 Pistol (vol. 1 2001, vol. 2 2006)
- The Gun Digest Book of the Glock (1st edition 2003, 2nd edition 2008)
- The Gun Digest Book of Smith & Wesson (2004)
- The Gun Digest Book of the AR-15 (vol. 1 2005, vol. 2 2007, vol. 3 2010, vol. 4 2012)
- The Gun Digest Book of Ruger: Pistols & Revolvers (2007)
- The World Encyclopedia of Rifles and Machine Guns: An Illustrated Guide to 500 Firearms (with Will Fowler; 1st edition 2007, 2nd edition 2009)
- The Illustrated Guide to Guns of the World: Pistols, Rifles, Revolvers, Machine and Submachine Guns Throughout History in 1100 Color Photographs (with Will Fowler, Anthony North, and Charles Stronge; 1st edition 2008, 2nd edition 2018)
- Big Fat Book of the .45 ACP (2009)
- The Gun Digest Book of the AK & SKS: A Complete Guide to Guns, Gear and Ammunition (vol. 1 2009, vol. 2 2017)
- 1911: The First 100 Years (1st edition 2010, 2nd edition 2019)
- Gunsmithing the AR-15 (vol. 1 2010, vol. 2 2014, vol. 3 2016, vol. 4 2018)
- Cartridges of the AR-15: A Complete Reference Guide to AR-15 and AR-10 Ammo (2020)
- Gun Digest Book of the Tactical Rifle (2011)
- Reloading for Handgunners (1st edition 2011, 2nd edition 2021)
- Gun Digest Book of Suppressors (2016)
- The Suppressor Handbook (2017)
- Choosing Handgun Ammo: The Facts That Matter Most for Self-Defense (2018)
- AR-15: Setup, Maintenance and Repair (2022)
- Gunsmithing the 1911 (2024)
