= List of equipment of the Indonesian Air Force =

List of aircraft used by the Indonesian Air Force

This is a list of equipment currently in service or on order, with the Indonesian Air Force, as well as some of the formerly used equipment.

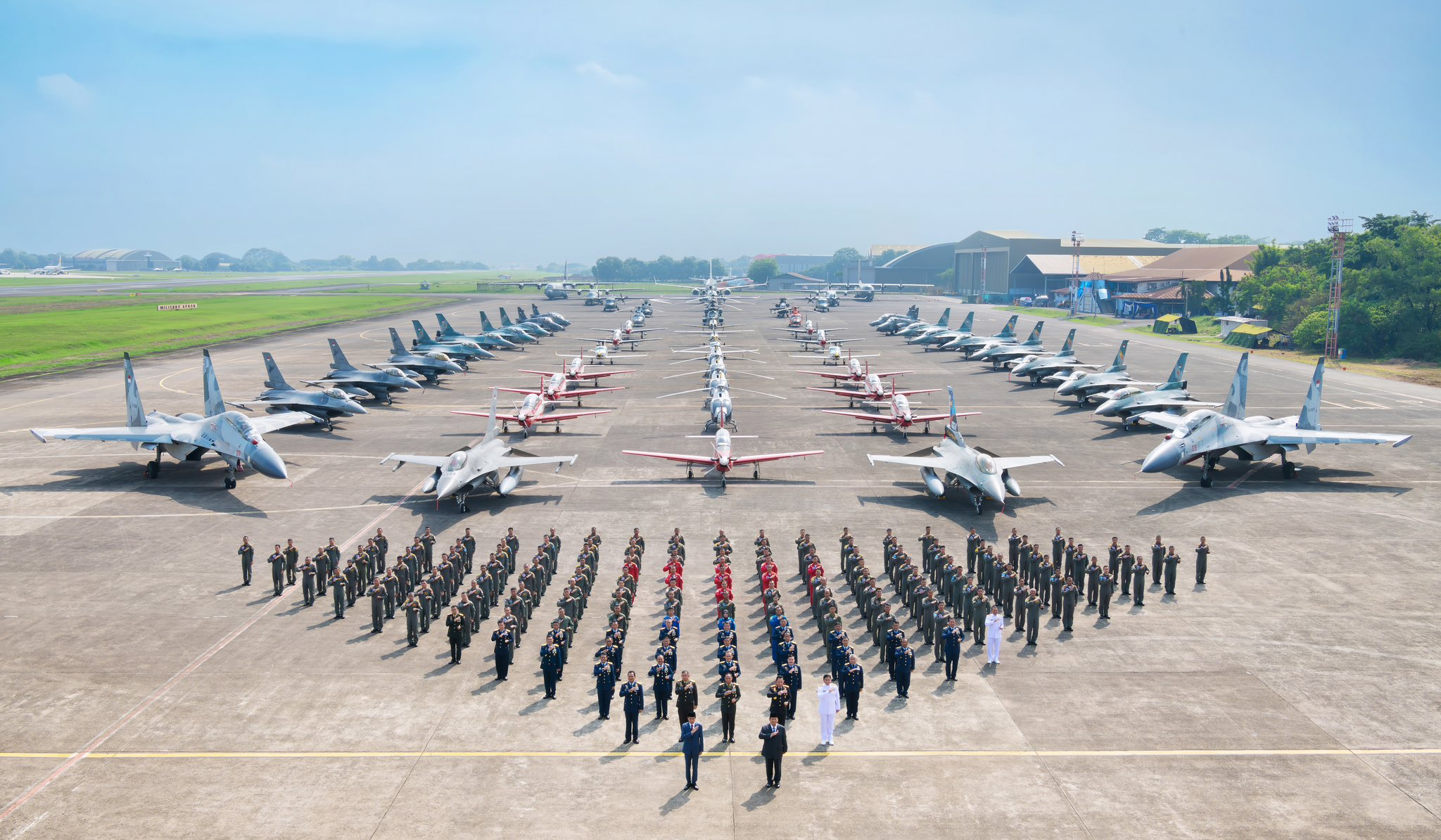
Aircraft of the Indonesian National Armed Forces shown during the TNI's 79th Anniversary in Halim Perdanakusuma Air Force Base

== List of aircraft ==
=== Fixed-wing aircraft ===
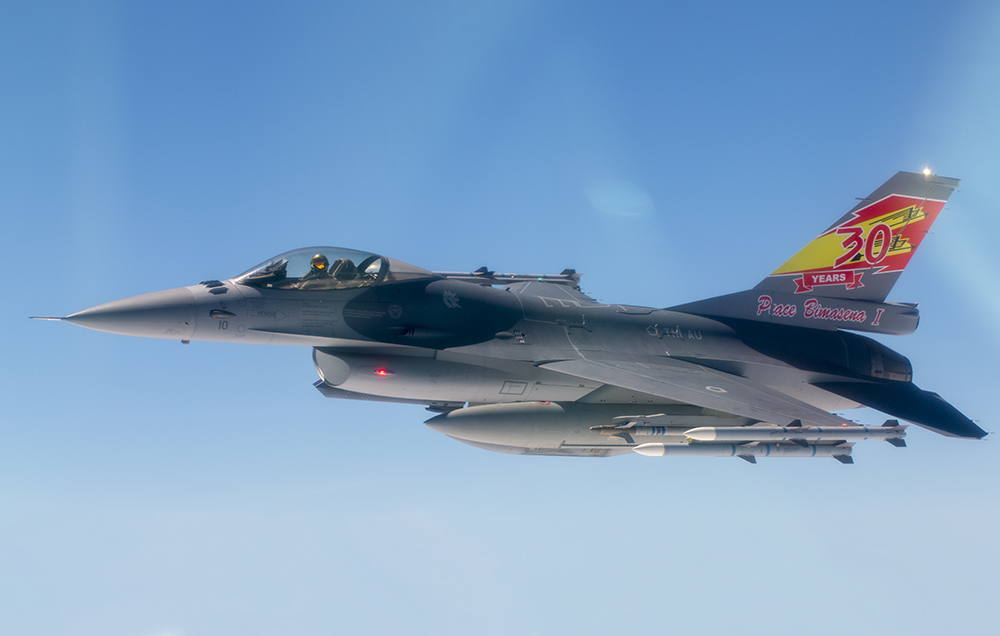
An F-16AM with 30 years anniversary tail art, 3rd Air Squadron

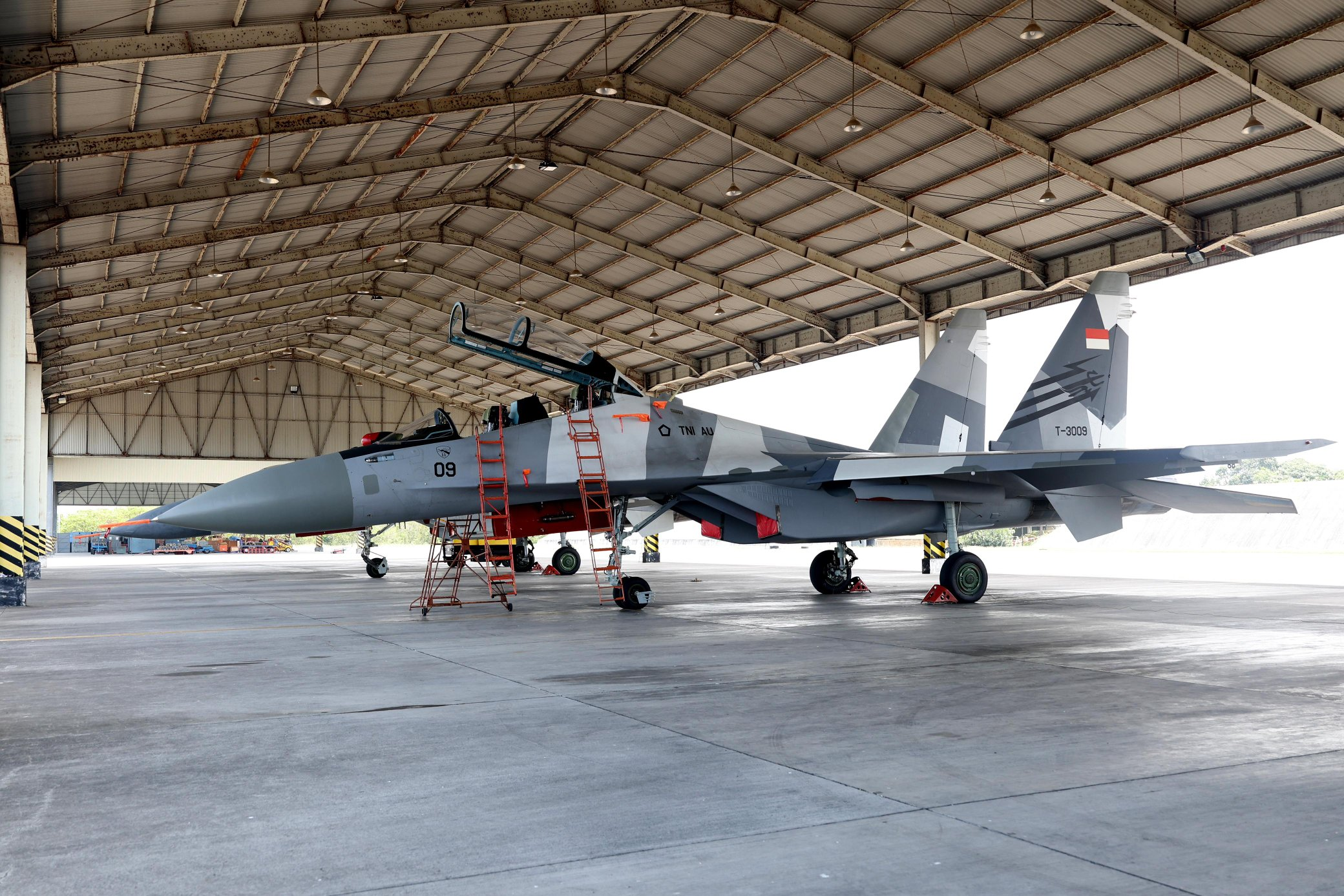
Su-30MK2, 11th Air Squadron

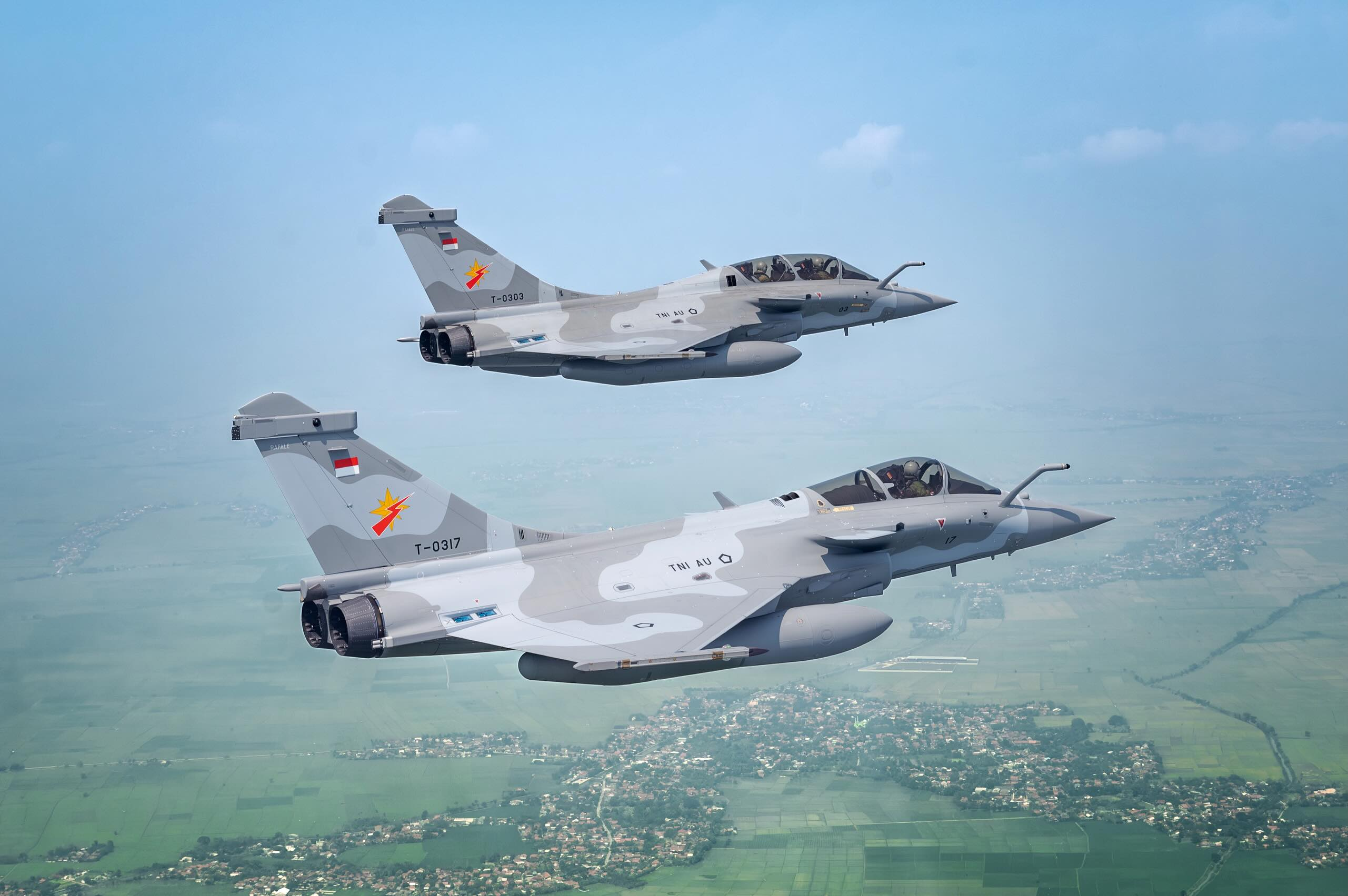
Rafale DI/EI F4.1 over the countryside, 12th Air Squadron

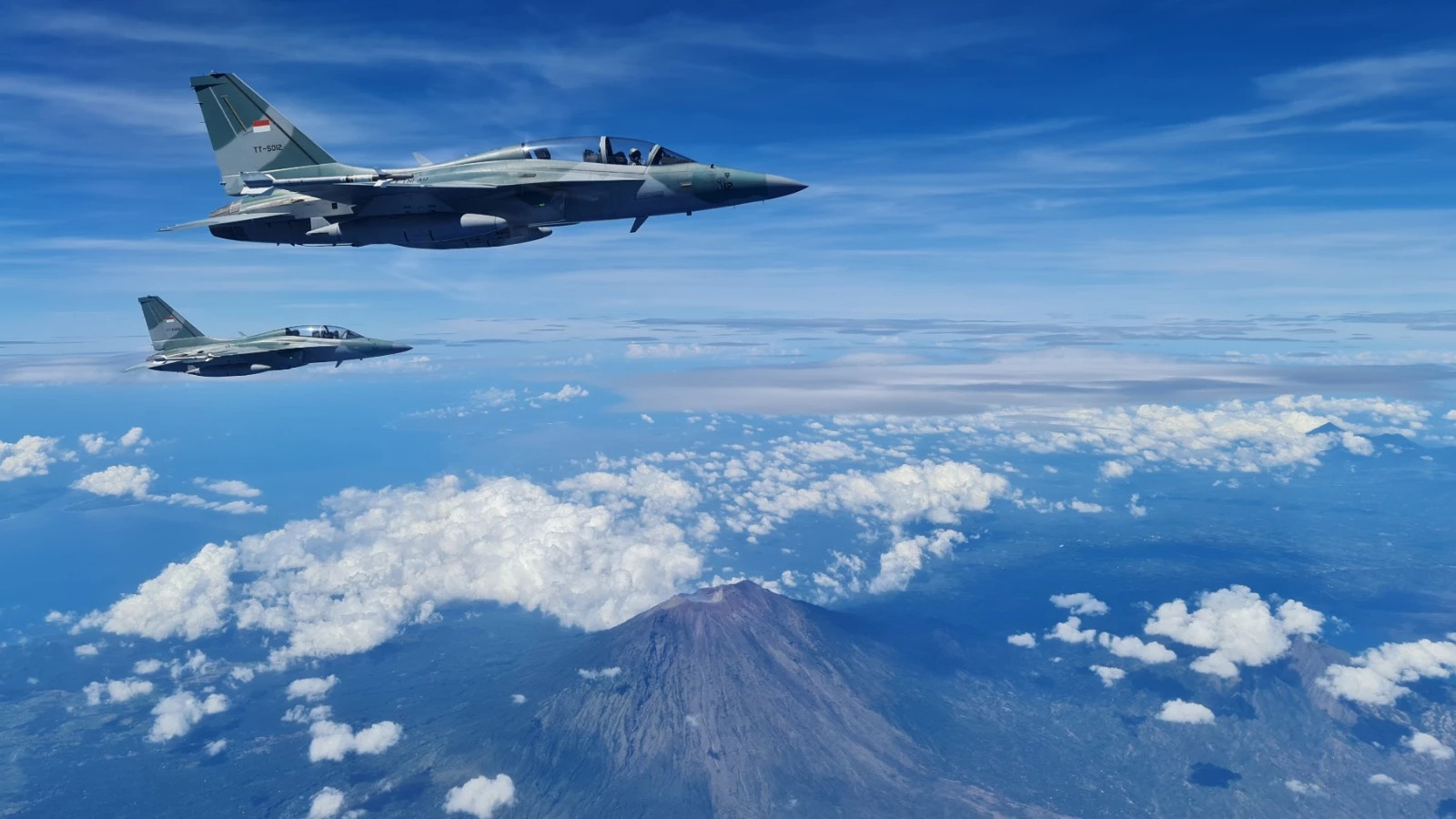
Two T-50i, 15th Air Squadron

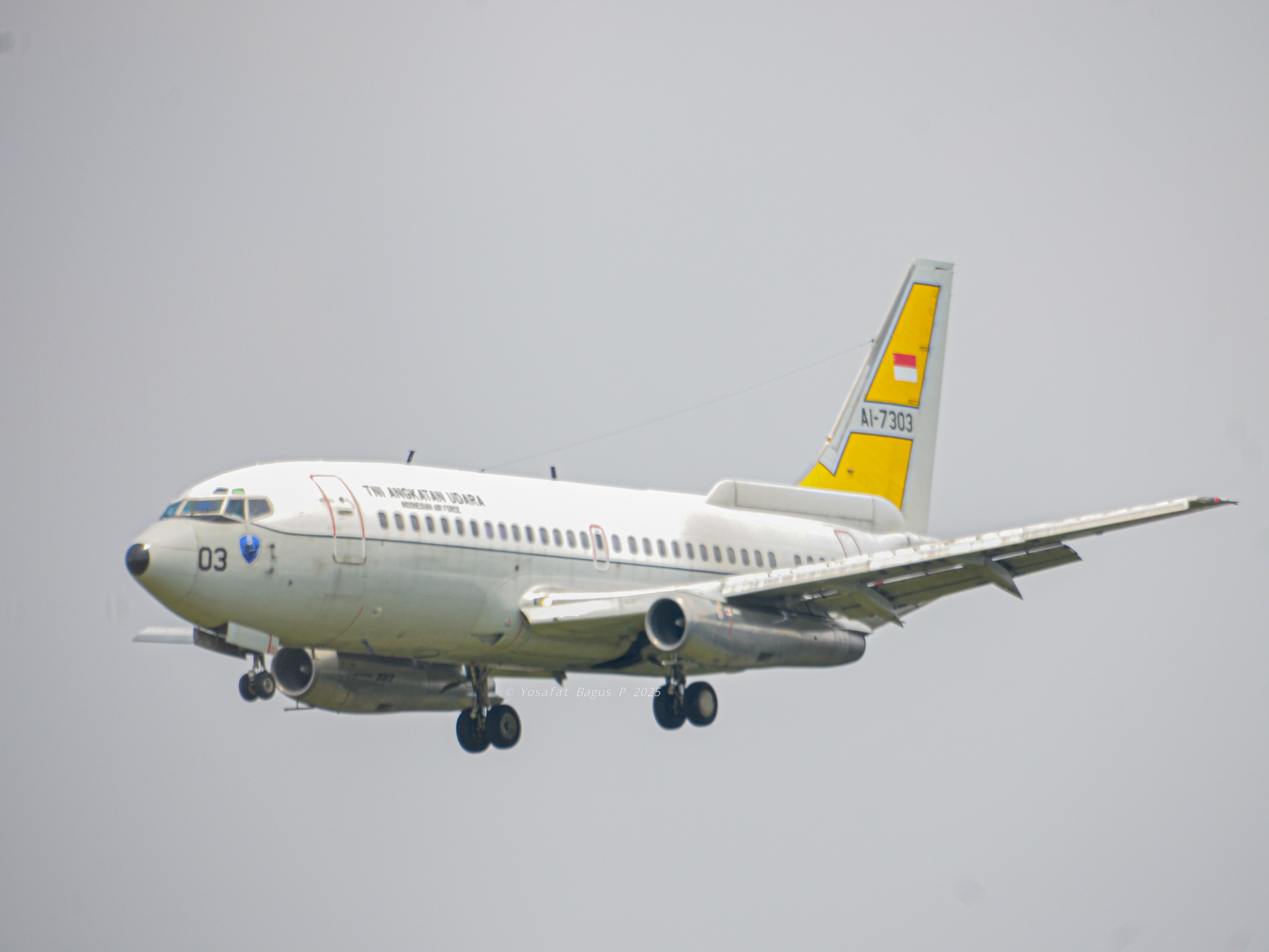
Boeing 737-2X9 surveillance aircraft landing at Halim AFB, 5th Air Squadron

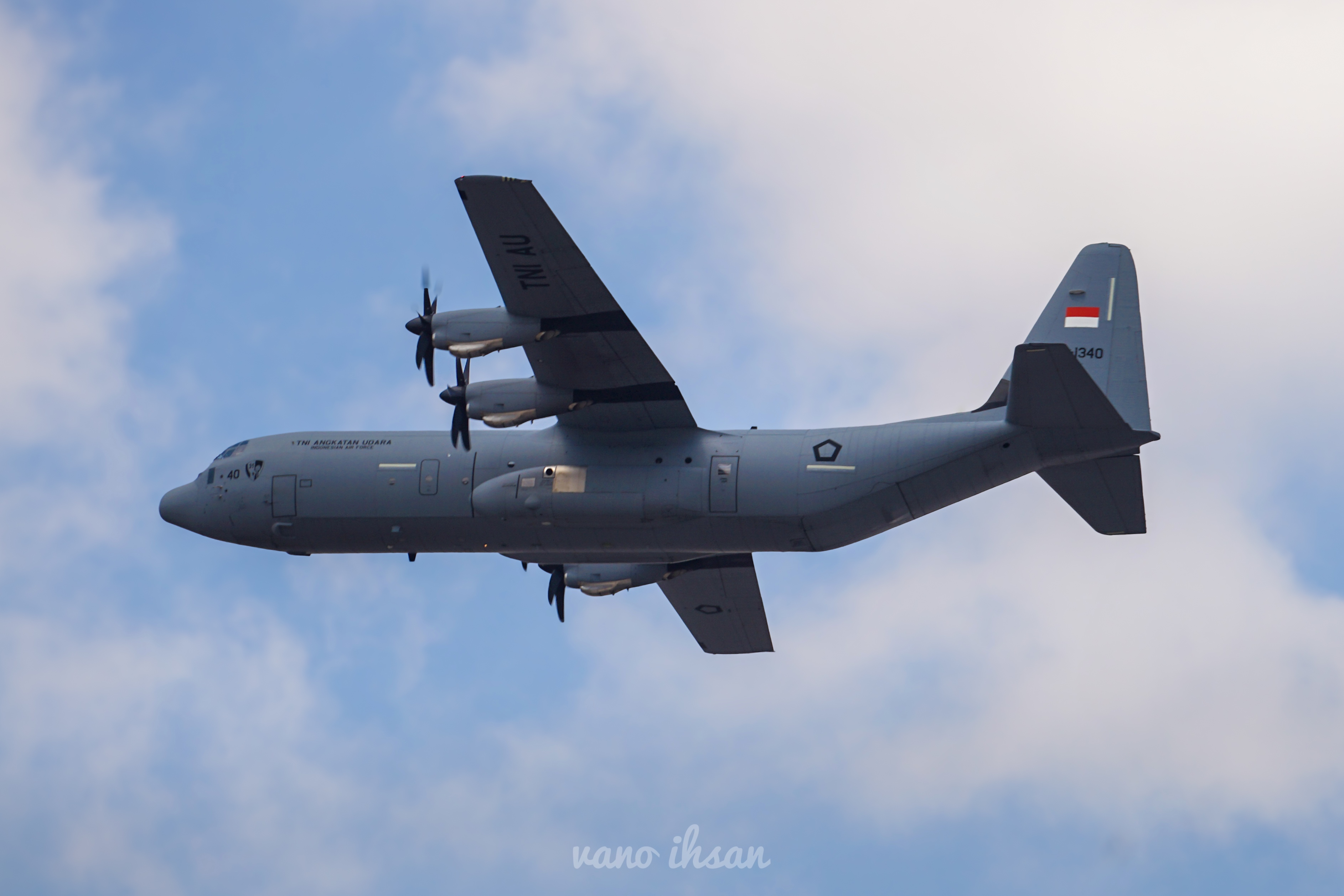
A Lockheed Martin C-130J-30 in Yogyakarta, 31st Air Squadron

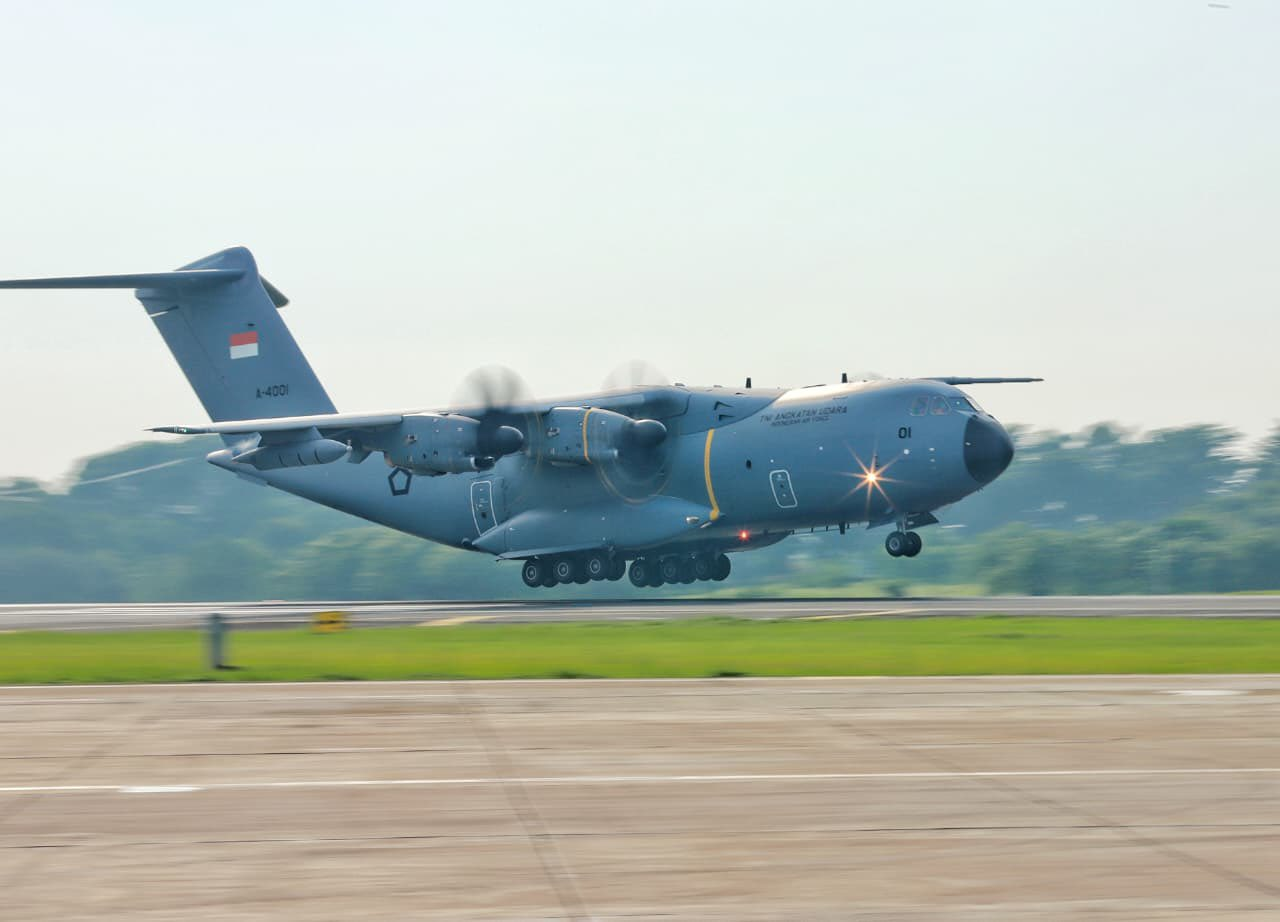
Airbus A400M Atlas arrived at Halim AFB, 31st Air Squadron

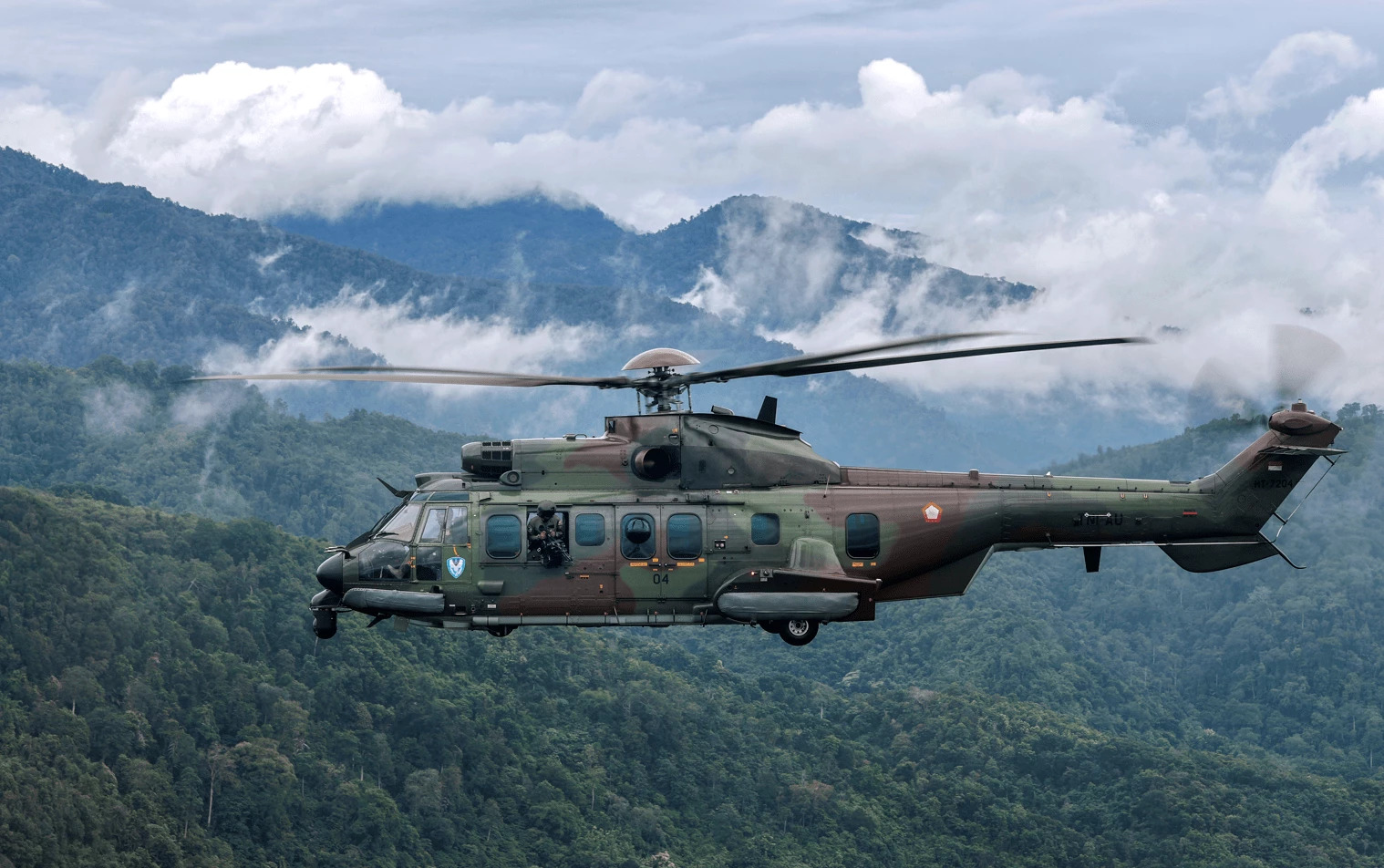
EC725, 8th Air Squadron

Aircraft	Origin	Type	Variant	In service	Notes
Combat aircraft
Dassault Rafale	France	Swingrole fighter	Rafale EI (F4.1)	2 (+ 24 on order)	(Note: Total 42 Rafale ordered, consisting of 26 Rafale EI and 16 Rafale DI, with an option for 24 additional Rafale. First delivery in May 2026.)
Dassault Rafale	France	Swingrole fighter	Rafale DI (F4.1)	4 (+12 on order)	(Note: Total 42 Rafale ordered, consisting of 26 Rafale EI and 16 Rafale DI, with an option for 24 additional Rafale. First delivery in May 2026.)
General Dynamics F-16 Fighting Falcon	United States	Multirole fighter	F-16AM	7	(Note: All 10 F-16 A/B Block 15 OCU has undergone Falcon STAR-eMLU (STructural Augmentation Roadmap-enhanced Mid-Life Update) upgrade program. Exact number of airframe in service: 7 F-16A, 3 F-16B, 18 F-16C, 5 F-16D. In total 33 aircraft. Upgraded F-16A/B are called AM/BM, sometimes also known as 'Falcon STAR eMLU' or just 'eMLU' as well as 'Block 20 MLU')
General Dynamics F-16 Fighting Falcon	United States	Multirole fighter	F-16BM	3	(Note: All 10 F-16 A/B Block 15 OCU has undergone Falcon STAR-eMLU (STructural Augmentation Roadmap-enhanced Mid-Life Update) upgrade program. Exact number of airframe in service: 7 F-16A, 3 F-16B, 18 F-16C, 5 F-16D. In total 33 aircraft. Upgraded F-16A/B are called AM/BM, sometimes also known as 'Falcon STAR eMLU' or just 'eMLU' as well as 'Block 20 MLU')
General Dynamics F-16 Fighting Falcon	United States	Multirole fighter	F-16C	18	(Note: All 10 F-16 A/B Block 15 OCU has undergone Falcon STAR-eMLU (STructural Augmentation Roadmap-enhanced Mid-Life Update) upgrade program. Exact number of airframe in service: 7 F-16A, 3 F-16B, 18 F-16C, 5 F-16D. In total 33 aircraft. Upgraded F-16A/B are called AM/BM, sometimes also known as 'Falcon STAR eMLU' or just 'eMLU' as well as 'Block 20 MLU')
General Dynamics F-16 Fighting Falcon	United States	Multirole fighter	F-16D	5	(Note: All 10 F-16 A/B Block 15 OCU has undergone Falcon STAR-eMLU (STructural Augmentation Roadmap-enhanced Mid-Life Update) upgrade program. Exact number of airframe in service: 7 F-16A, 3 F-16B, 18 F-16C, 5 F-16D. In total 33 aircraft. Upgraded F-16A/B are called AM/BM, sometimes also known as 'Falcon STAR eMLU' or just 'eMLU' as well as 'Block 20 MLU')
Sukhoi Su-27	Russia	Air superiority fighter / interceptor	Su-27SK	2	(Note: 2 × Su-27SK purchased in 2003. 3 × Su-27SKM purchased in August 2007.)
Sukhoi Su-27	Russia	Air superiority fighter / interceptor	Su-27SKM	3	(Note: 2 × Su-27SK purchased in 2003. 3 × Su-27SKM purchased in August 2007.)
Sukhoi Su-30	Russia	Multirole fighter	Su-30MK	2	(Note: 2 × Su-30MK purchased in 2003. 3 × Su-30MK2 purchased in August 2007. 6 × Su-30 MK2 purchased in December 2011.)
Sukhoi Su-30	Russia	Multirole fighter	Su-30MK2	9	(Note: 2 × Su-30MK purchased in 2003. 3 × Su-30MK2 purchased in August 2007. 6 × Su-30 MK2 purchased in December 2011.)
TAI TF Kaan	Turkey / Indonesia	Stealth fighter	Block 30	0 (+ 48 on order)	(Note: Contract signed in July 2025, deliveries planned for the 2032–2035 period.)
KAI KF-21 Boramae	South Korea / Indonesia	Swingrole fighter	–	0 (+ 1 on order)	Fifth prototype of the KF-21 transferred to Indonesia.
Light combat aircraft
BAE Hawk	United Kingdom	Light multirole fighter (single seat)	Hawk 209	21	(Note: 16 purchased in 1993, 16 in 1996. 11 were lost. 21 remain in service.)
KAI T-50 Golden Eagle	South Korea	Lead-in fighter trainer / light attack aircraft	T-50i	19	(Note: 16 delivered by January 2014, 3 of which were lost in accidents. 6 purchased in 2021 and delivered in 2026. First batch upgraded with combat capability in 2018.)
Embraer EMB 314 Super Tucano	Brazil	Light attack aircraft / Counter-insurgency	–	13	(Note: 16 purchase in 2011, 3 of which were lost in accidents.)
Leonardo M-346 Master	Italy	Lead-in fighter trainer / light multirole fighter	M-346F Block 20	0 (+ 12 on order)	(Note: Leonardo M-346F Block 20: A letter of intent was signed in February 2026 (Singapore Airshow 2026) for the purchase of 24 M-346F Block 20 and an option for 12 additional aircraft. The contract for the order of 12 M-346 Block 20 (of the 24 planned + 12 options) was signed in July 2026.)
Special mission
Boeing 737-200	United States	Maritime patrol	737-2X9 Surveiller	3	
Boeing 737-200	United States	Maritime patrol	737-2Q8 Adv	1	(Note: One 737-200 (A/AI-7304) converted from transport to surveillance mission.)
EADS CASA C-295	Spain / Indonesia	Maritime patrol	CN295 Special Mission	1	
CASA / IPTN CN235	Spain / Indonesia	Maritime patrol	CN235-220 MPA	2	
IAe NC212	Spain / Indonesia	Aerial photography (Recce) / cloud seeding	NC212i	3 (+ 1 on order)	(Note: Part of an order for 9 NC212i, by the Indonesian Air Force, 4 for transport, 1 for navigation training, 4 for aerial photography and cloud seeding.)
Tanker
Airbus A400M	Europe	Tanker / strategic and tactical airlifter / MEDEVAC	A400M MRTT	2	(Note: 2 ordered in 2021, delivered in November 2025 and March 2026. Configured for aerial refuelling, transport, medical evacuation and humanitarian missions.)
Lockheed KC-130	United States	Tanker / tactical airlifter	KC-130B	1	(Note: 2 KC-130B converted, one lost in 2015.)
Transport
Lockheed Martin C-130J Super Hercules	United States	Tactical airlifter	C-130J-30	5	
Lockheed C-130 Hercules	United States	Tactical airlifter	C-130B	2	(Note: 8 purchased from Lockheed in 1960, and 3 transferred from USAF in 1974. One was shot down in 1965, two were lost in 1964 and 2009, six were retired, and two remain in service.)
Lockheed C-130 Hercules	United States	Tactical airlifter	C-130H	11	(Note: 4 purchased from the RAAF in 2012, 5 additional in 2013, one of which was lost in 2016. 3 C-130H purchased in the 1970s by Indonesia remain in service. 9 being modernised since 2024)
Lockheed C-130 Hercules	United States	Tactical airlifter	C-130H-30	5	(Note: Of the 7 C-130H-30 purchased from Lockheed in the early 1980s, 1 is stored, 1 was lost.)
Lockheed L-100 Hercules	United States	Tactical airlifter	L-100-30	3	(Note: Out of 5 second-hand L-100 from civilian operators, 3 remain in service (1 lost in 2001, 1 crashed in 2009).)
EADS CASA C-295	Spain / Indonesia	Tactical airlifter	CN295	9	(Note: 9 ordered in 2012 in the transport variant. Licensed built by Indonesian Aerospace. Note: one of the 9 is damaged after an incident in March 2026.)
CASA / IPTN CN235	Spain / Indonesia	Tactical airlifter	CN235-100M	1	Back in service in early 2026.
CASA / IPTN CN235	Spain / Indonesia	Tactical airlifter	CN235-220M	3	
IAe NC212	Spain / Indonesia	Tactical airlifter	NC212-200M	9	
IAe NC212	Spain / Indonesia	Tactical airlifter	NC212i	4	(Note: Part of an order for 9 NC212i, by the Indonesian Air Force, 4 for transport, 1 for navigation training, 4 for aerial photography and cloud seeding.)
VIP transport
Boeing 737	United States	VIP transport	737-400 (737 classic)	3	(Note: Aircraft number and the variants: A-7305 Boeing 737-4U3, A-7306 Boeing 737-4U3, A-7308 Boeing 737-4Y0, A-7307 Boeing 737-5U3, A-7309 Boeing 737-8LD, A-7310 Boeing 737-8LD)
Boeing 737	United States	VIP transport	737-500 (737 classic)	1	(Note: Aircraft number and the variants: A-7305 Boeing 737-4U3, A-7306 Boeing 737-4U3, A-7308 Boeing 737-4Y0, A-7307 Boeing 737-5U3, A-7309 Boeing 737-8LD, A-7310 Boeing 737-8LD)
Boeing 737	United States	VIP transport	737-800 (737 NG)	2	(Note: Aircraft number and the variants: A-7305 Boeing 737-4U3, A-7306 Boeing 737-4U3, A-7308 Boeing 737-4Y0, A-7307 Boeing 737-5U3, A-7309 Boeing 737-8LD, A-7310 Boeing 737-8LD)
Boeing 737	United States	VIP transport	737-700 BBJ1	1	Primary Indonesian presidential aircraft. (Note: Primary Indonesian presidential aircraft, leased, and operated by the Air Force.)
Boeing 737	United States	VIP transport	737-800 BBJ2	1	Secondary Indonesian presidential aircraft. (Note: Secondary Indonesian presidential aircraft, operated by the Air Force, but owned by the State Secretariat of the Republic of Indonesia. Received in 2014, and supplemented by the BBJ1 in 2025.)
Airbus A340	Europe	VIP transport	A340-500	1	
Dassault Falcon 8X	France	VIP transport / liaison aircraft	–	4 (+ 2 on order)	(Note: 1 Falcon 7X amd 1 Falcon 8X interim transport aircraft operated from 2022 to 2024–2025. 4 Falcon 8X introduced in 2026.)
Lockheed L-100 Hercules	United States	VIP transport	L-100-30	1	(Note: 1 L-100-30 for VIP transport was purchased from Lockheed in 1979.)
Lockheed C-130 Hercules	United States	VIP transport	C-130H-30	1	(Note: 1 C-130H-30 for VIP transport was purchased from Lockheed in 1980.)
Trainer aircraft
BAE Hawk	United Kingdom	Advanced trainer / light attack aircraft	Hawk 109	7	(Note: 8 purchased in 1993. 1 was lost. 7 remain in service.)
KAI KT-1 Woongbi	South Korea	Basic trainer	KT-1B	16	(Note: 12 purchased in 2011, 3 in 2018.)
Grob G120	Germany	Ab initio trainer	G120TP	30	(Note: 18 ordered in 2011, 6 more received in 2016, and 6 more in 2018.)
Cessna T-41 Mescalero	United States	Ab initio trainer	T-41D	1	(Note: Transferred from the Indonesian Air Force Academy in 2021.)
IAe NC212	Spain / Indonesia	Navigation trainer	NC212-200M	1	
IAe NC212	Spain / Indonesia	Navigation trainer	NC212i NavTrain	1	(Note: Delivered in December 2025. Licensed built by Indonesian Aerospace.) (Note: Part of an order for 9 NC212i, by the Indonesian Air Force, 4 for transport, 1 for navigation training, 4 for aerial photography and cloud seeding.)
Cessna 172	United States	Ab initio trainer	172S Skyhawk SP	2	Used by Indonesian Air Force Academy
Cessna 182	United States	Ab initio trainer	182T Skylane	2	Used by Indonesian Air Force Academy
DG Flugzeugbau DG-1000	Germany	Glider trainer	–	N/A	Used by Indonesian Air Force Academy
Schweizer SGS 2-33	United States	Glider trainer	SGS 2-33A	N/A	Used by Indonesian Air Force Academy
Pilatus PC-24	Switzerland	Multi-engine trainer / liaison aircraft	–	0 (+ 12 on order)	Ordered in 2026.

==== Planned future fixed-wing aircraft ====
This lists the aircraft planned to be purchased by the Indonesian Air Force through its modernisation.

===== Combat aircraft =====
- Jet fighters:
  - KAI KF-21 Boramae: The fifth prototype of the development programme is to be transferred to Indonesia. In parallel, talks regarding the purchase of KF-21 aircraft are ongoing, with a potential quantity published of 16 aircraft. Some sources says the government will make the decision to acquire 48 aircraft (36 additional aircraft remaining).
  - J-10CE: The Air Force has discussed plans and budgetting for the aquisition of up to 24–42 J-10CEs, however no known contract has been signed yet. Republika reported that the J-10 may be delivered in April 2027.

===== Transport aircraft =====
- Airbus A400M: Indonesia signed a letter of intent for four additional A400M in 2021, when two A400M were ordered.

=== Rotary wing aircraft ===
Aircraft	Origin	Type	Variant	In service	Notes
Transport helicopters
Eurocopter AS332 Super Puma	France / Indonesia	Transport / VIP transport / utility	NAS 332C1	12	12 remain in service. Several units are used as VIP helicopters. Licensed built by Indonesian Aerospace.
Eurocopter AS332 Super Puma	France / Indonesia	Transport / VIP transport / utility	NAS 332L1	12	12 remain in service. Several units are used as VIP helicopters. Licensed built by Indonesian Aerospace.
Eurocopter AS332 Super Puma	France / Indonesia	Transport / VIP transport / utility	NAS 332L2	12	12 remain in service. Several units are used as VIP helicopters. Licensed built by Indonesian Aerospace.
Leonardo AW189	Italy	Transport / utility	–	0 (+ 5 on order)	6 AW 189 on order (1 at least in VIP configuration, likely 5 in transport / utility configuration).
Search and rescue (SAR)
Airbus H225M	France / Indonesia	CSAR (combat search and rescue)	–	12	14 H225M (12 in CSAR configuration, 2 in VIP transport configuration). (Note: 14 H225M are in service, 12 in CSAR configuration. They were assembled in Indonesia, and partially manufactured locally by PTDI. Orders: 6 in CSAR configuration in 2012; 8 in January 2019, 6 in CSAR configuration, 2 in VIP transport configuration.); Licensed built by Indonesian Aerospace.
AgustaWestland AW139	Italy	SAR	–	1	Operated by the Air Force for the National Search And Rescue Agency.
IPTN NBO 105	Germany / Indonesia	SAR	NBO 105CB	1	Operated by the Air Force for the National Search And Rescue Agency, and licensed built by Indonesian Aerospace.
VIP transport
Airbus H225M	France / Indonesia	VIP transport	–	2	Total 14 H225M (12 in CSAR configuration, 2 in VIP transport configuration). (Note: 14 H225M are in service, 12 in CSAR configuration. They were assembled in Indonesia, and partially manufactured locally by PTDI. Orders: 6 in CSAR configuration in 2012; 8 in January 2019, 6 in CSAR configuration, 2 in VIP transport configuration.); Licensed built by Indonesian Aerospace.
AgustaWestland AW101	United Kingdom / Italy	VIP transport	Mk 641	1	
Leonardo AW189	Italy	VIP transport	–	0 (+ 1 on order)	6 AW 189 on order (1 at least in VIP configuration, likely 5 in transport / utility configuration).
Trainer helicopters
Eurocopter EC120 Colibri	France	Rotorcraft trainer	EC120B	14 (Note: Orders of the EC-120 by the Indonesian Armed Forces: 2000: 15 EC-120B.; 10 for the Air Force; 5 for the Navy; 2008: 2 for the Army Transfers of the EC-120B from the other branches to the Air Force: 2 from the Army (2024); 2 from the Navy (2025))	(Note: Orders of the EC-120 by the Indonesian Armed Forces: 2000: 15 EC-120B.; 10 for the Air Force; 5 for the Navy; 2008: 2 for the Army Transfers of the EC-120B from the other branches to the Air Force: 2 from the Army (2024); 2 from the Navy (2025))
Airbus H145	Germany	Rotorcraft trainer / Light SAR	H145D3	0 (+ 4 on order)	Ordered in 2024.

Note: despite what the World Air Forces 2026 document mentions, the SA330 fleet was retired from the Indonesian Air Force in 2023.

=== Unmanned aerial vehicles ===
Aircraft	Origin	Type	Role	Variant	In service	Notes
Unmanned Combat Aerial Vehicle (UCAV)
CASC Rainbow	China	Fixed wing, MALE (medium-altitude long-endurance)	UCAV	CH-4B	6	
TAI Anka	Turkey	Fixed wing, MALE	UCAV	Anka-S	3 (+ 3 on order)	(Note: 12 TAI Anka-S ordered by the Indonesian National Armed Forces, 6 for the Indonesian Air Force, 3 for the Indonesian Army and 3 for the Indonesian Navy. 3 delivered in 2025.)
Bayraktar Akinci	Turkey	Fixed wing, HALE (high-altitude long-endurance)	UCAV	–	0 (+ 9 on order)	(Note: Deal for 12 systems signed in February 2025, local production under licence.)
Unmanned Intelligence, Surveillance, and Reconnaissance (ISR)
IAe Wulung	Indonesia	Fixed wing	ISR	–	3	
Aeronautics Defense Orbiter	Israel	Fixed wing, SUAV (small unmanned aerial vehicle)	ISR	Orbiter 2B	N/A	Used by Korpasgat.
Unmanned Trainer
Aeronautics Aerostar Tactical UAS	Israel	Fixed wing	Trainer	–	4	
IPCD UAV-D	France; Indonesia	Fixed wing	Trainer	–	N/A	licensed built by Indo Pacific Communication & Defense.

== Aircraft munitions ==
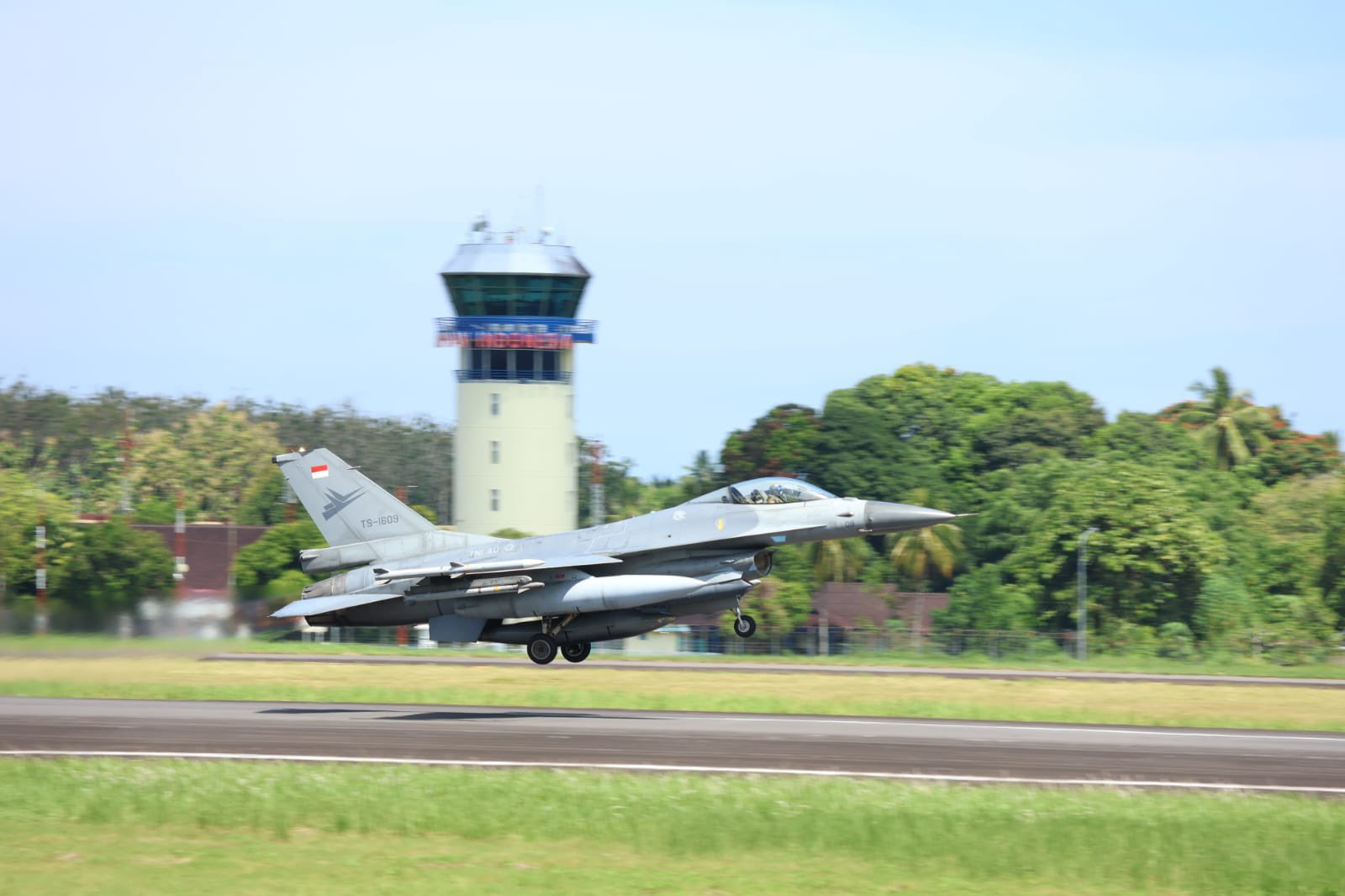
F-16AM fighter jet with AMRAAM C-7 and Sidewinder X Block II missile

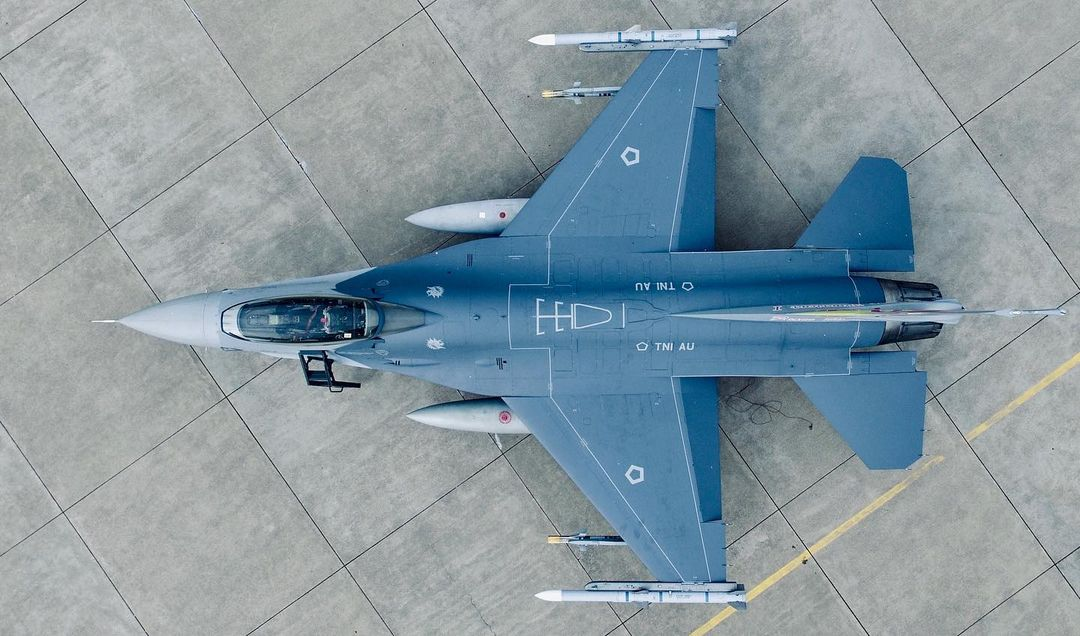
F-16AM fighter jet with AMRAAM and Sidewinder missile

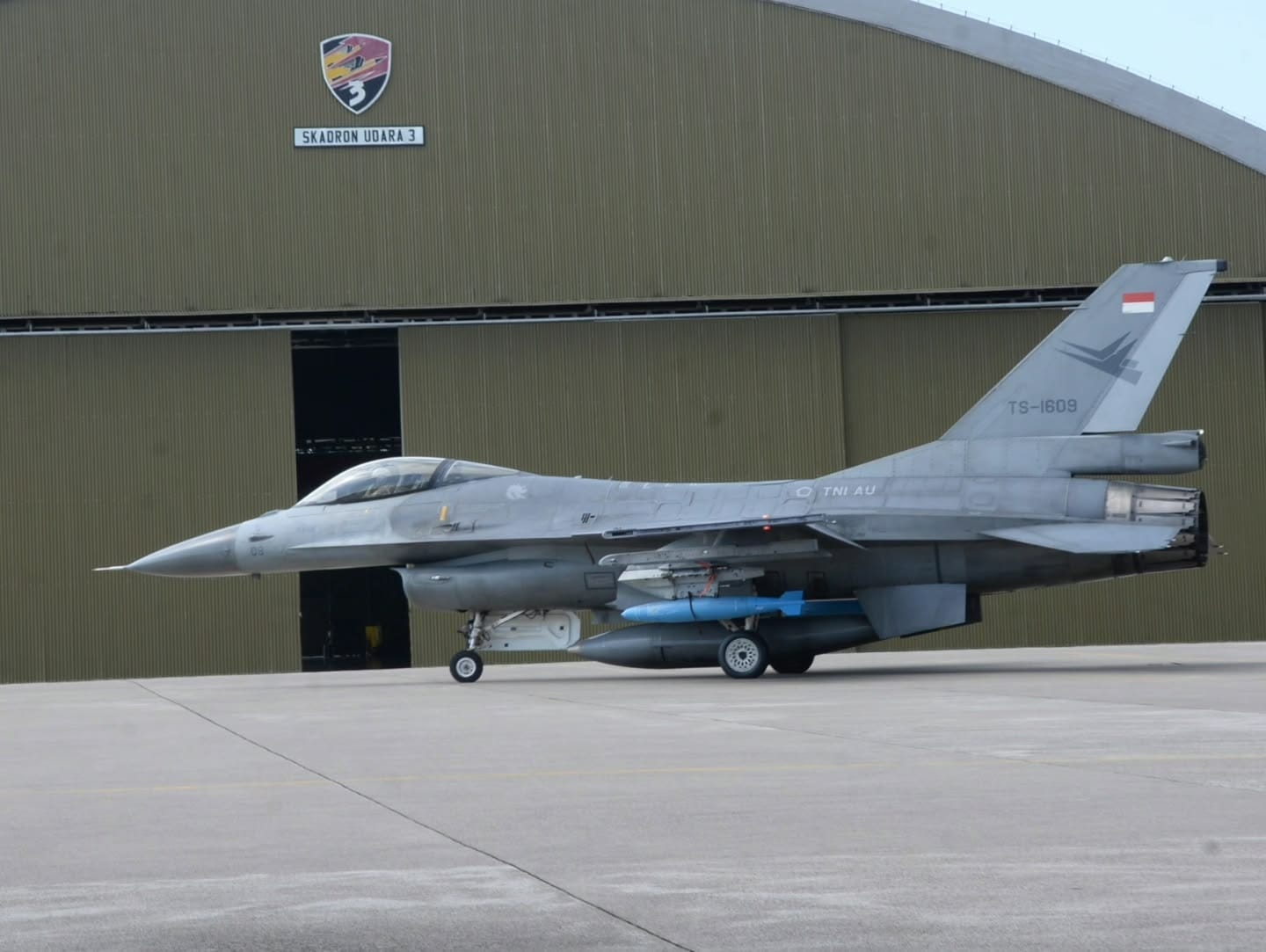
F-16AM TS-1609 with inert Mk 82 bomb at Iswahjudi AFB

Model	Origin	Type	Variant	Used with	Notes
Cannons
GIAT 30	France	Revolver cannon (30×150mm B)	GIAT 30M 791	Rafale EI (F4) / Rafale DI (F4)	
GSh-30-1	Russia	Autocannon (30×165mm)	–	Su-27SK / Su-27SKM / Su-30MK / Su-30MK2	
M61 Vulcan	United States	Rotary cannon (6 barrels) (20×102mm)	M61A1	F-16AM / F-16BM / F-16C / F-16D	
M61 Vulcan	United States	Rotary cannon (6 barrels) (20×102mm)	M61A2	KF-21	
M197	United States	Rotary cannon (3 barrels) (20×102mm)	–	T-50i	
FN M2	United States	Machine guns (12.7×99mm NATO)	FN M3P	EMB 314	1 integrated in each wing.
Air-to-Air Missile (AAM)
Meteor	Europe	BVR, radar homing (beyond-visual-range)	–	Rafale EI (F4) / Rafale DI (F4)	
AIM-120 AMRAAM	United States	BVR, radar homing	AIM-120C-7	F-16AM / F-16BM / F-16C / F-16D	Also potentially used with the NASAMS 2 air defence systems.
AIM-9 Sidewinder	United States	Short range, infrared homing	AIM-9P4 / AIM-9P5	F-16AM / F-16BM / F-16C / F-16D / Hawk 109 / Hawk 209 / T-50i	
AIM-9 Sidewinder	United States	Short range, infrared homing	AIM-9X Block II	F-16AM / F-16BM / F-16C / F-16D	
R-77	Russia	BVR, radar homing	RVV-AE	Su-27SKM / Su-30MK2	
R-27	Ukraine / Russia	Medium range, semi-active radar homing	R-27R1	Su-27SK / Su-27SKM / Su-30MK / Su-30MK2	Purchased from the Ukrainian manufacturer of the missile.
R-27	Ukraine / Russia	Medium range, semi-active radar homing	R-27ER1	Su-27SK / Su-27SKM / Su-30MK / Su-30MK2	Purchased from the Ukrainian manufacturer of the missile.
R-73	Russia	Short range, infrared homing	R-73E	Su-27SK / Su-27SKM / Su-30MK / Su-30MK2	
Air-to-Ground Missile (AGM)
Kh-59 Ovod	Russia	Air-launched, land attack cruise missile (EO guidance)	Kh-59M	Su-30MK / Su-30MK2	
Kh-31	Russia	Anti-radiation missile	Kh-31P	Su-30MK / Su-30MK2	
Kh-29	Russia	Air-to-ground tactical missile	Kh-29TE	Su-30MK / Su-30MK2	Short range missile with a heavy warhead.
AGM-65 Maverick	United States	Air-to-ground tactical missile (dual EO / IR guidance system) (close air support missile)	AGM-65D / AGM-65G / AGM-65K2	F-16AM / F-16BM / F-16C / F-16D / Hawk 109 / Hawk 209 / T-50i	The training variant (TGM-65G / TGM-65K2) is also in service.
C-907	China	Air-to-ground tactical missile (close air support missile)	–	Su-30MK / Su-30MK2	
AR-2	China	Air-to-ground tactical missile (close air support missile)	AR-2	CH-4B	
Guided bombs
AASM Hammer	France	Precision guided glide bomb	N/A (available options)	Rafale EI (F4) / Rafale DI (F4)	
JDAM	United States	Precision guided bomb	GBU-38	F-16AM / F-16BM / F-16C / F-16D / Hawk 109 / Hawk 209 / T-50i	Warhead, Mark 82, 500 lb (230 kg) bomb. Guided with the AAQ-33 Sniper ATP.
JDAM	United States	Precision guided bomb	GBU-54	F-16AM / F-16BM / F-16C / F-16D / Hawk 109 / Hawk 209 / T-50i	Warhead, Mark 82, 500 lb (230 kg) bomb. Guided with the AAQ-33 Sniper ATP.
Unguided bombs
Mark 81	Indonesia	General-purpose bomb (118 kg (260 lb))	Mk 81 RI	EMB 314	
Mark 82	United States	General-purpose bomb (500 lb (230 kg))	–	F-16AM / F-16BM / F-16C / F-16D / Hawk 109 / Hawk 209 / T-50i	Used with JDAM guidance kits.
BNT-250	Indonesia	General-purpose bomb (500 lb (230 kg))	–	–	Successor of the Mk 82.
M117	United States	Unguided bomb 790 lb (360 kg)	-	F-16AM / F-16BM / F-16C / F-16D / Hawk 109 / Hawk 209 / T-50i	
P-bombs	Indonesia	Unguided bomb 100 kg (220 lb)	P-100L	Su-27SK / Su-27SKM / Su-30MK / Su-30MK2	
P-bombs	Indonesia	Unguided bomb 100 kg (220 lb)	P-250L	Su-27SK / Su-27SKM / Su-30MK / Su-30MK2	
OFAB-100	Russia	Unguided bomb 100 kg (220 lb)	–	Su-27SK / Su-27SKM / Su-30MK / Su-30MK2	
OFAB-250	Russia	Unguided bomb 250 kg (550 lb)	–	Su-27SK / Su-27SKM / Su-30MK / Su-30MK2	
Rockets
FFAR 70mm	Belgium / Indonesia	Rocket / rocket pod (7 × 70mm)	–	Hawk 109 / Hawk 209 / T-50i / EMB 314	Licence made rockets from FZ (Thales Belgium).
S8 Kom	Russia	Rocket / rocket pod (2 × 80mm)	–	Su-27SK / Su-27SKM / Su-30MK / Su-30MK2	

== Air defence ==
=== Air defence systems ===
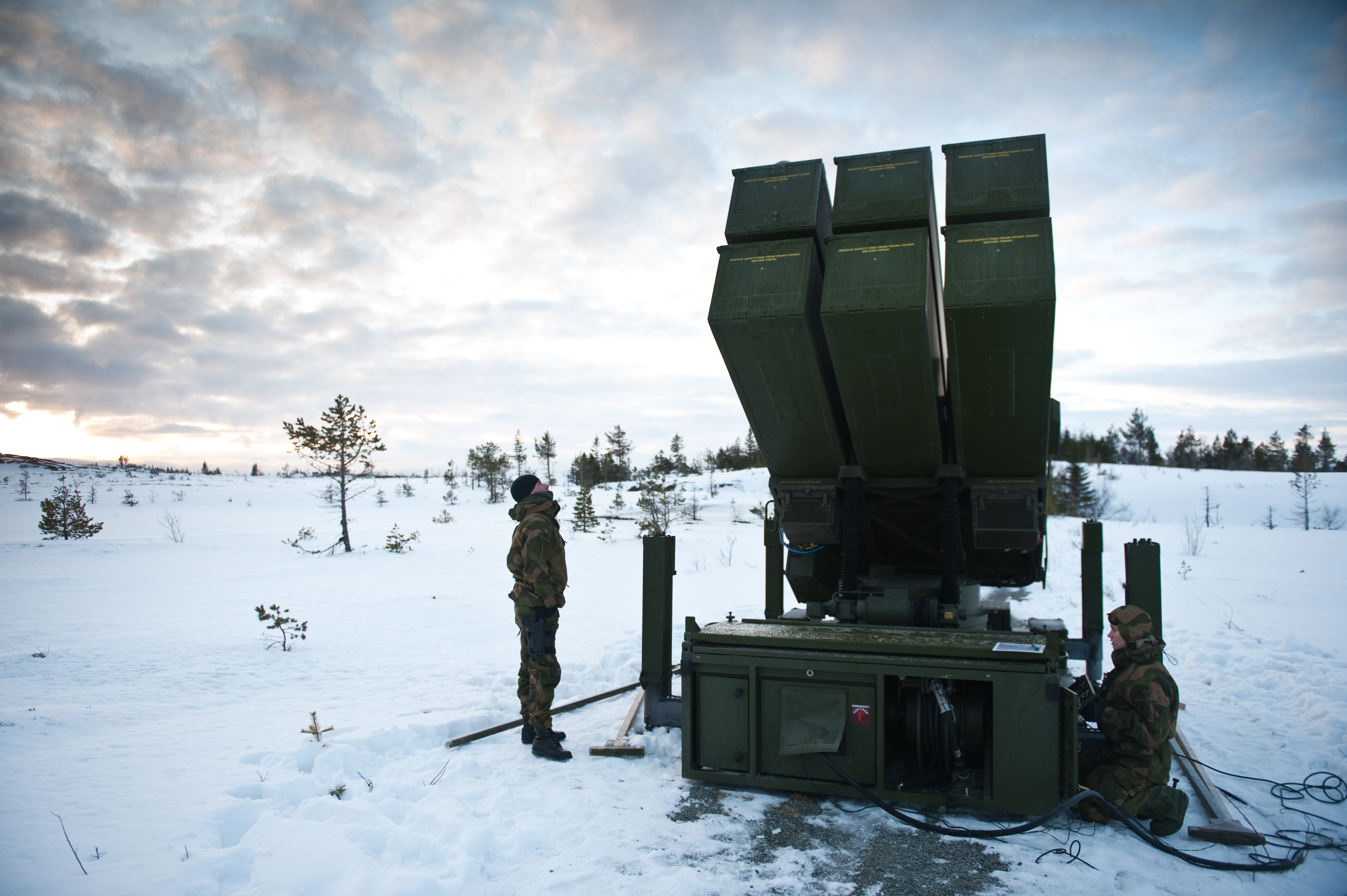
NASAMS 2

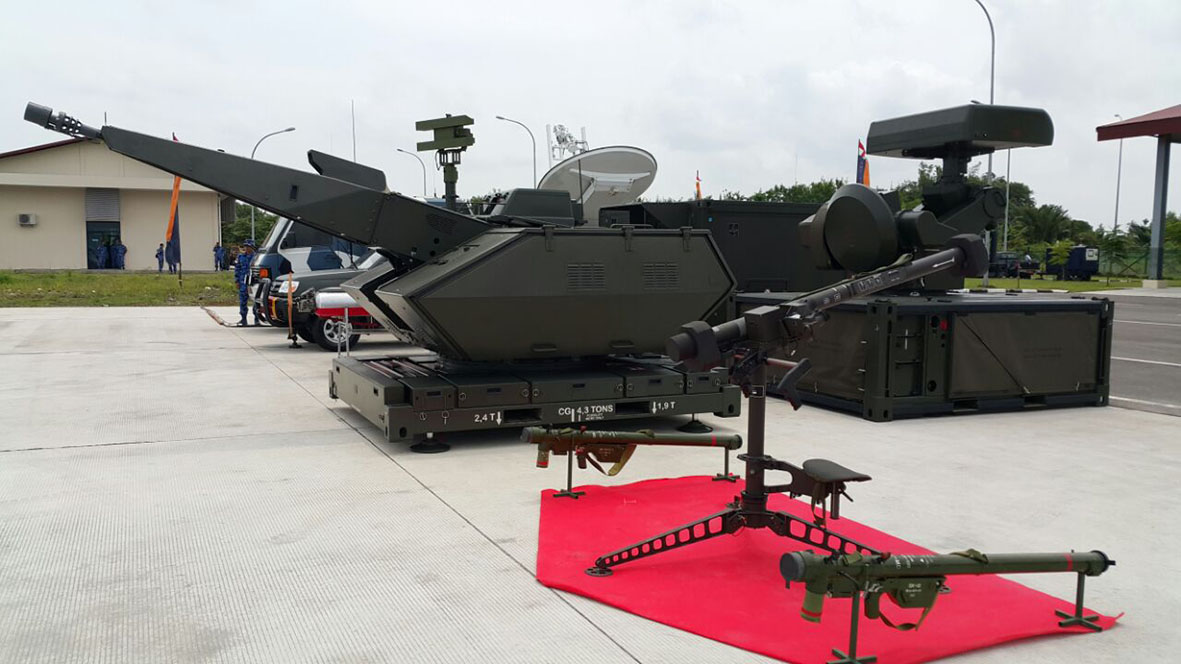
Skyshield air defence system

Model	Origin	Type	Elements of the air defence system	In service	Notes
Surface-to-Air Missiles (SAM)
NASAMS 2	Norway; United States	Medium range SAM system	Kongsberg SFC; SHORAD fire control (1 per fire unit)	2 (fire units)	Deployed from 2020.
NASAMS 2	Norway; United States	Medium range SAM system	2 AN/MPQ-64F1 Sentinel, X-band, electronically steered, pulse-Doppler, 3D radar (1 per fire unit)	2 (fire units)	Deployed from 2020.
NASAMS 2	Norway; United States	Medium range SAM system	6 NASAMS Mk2 launchers (3 per fire unit)	2 (fire units)	Deployed from 2020.
NASAMS 2	Norway; United States	Medium range SAM system	AIM-120C-7 anti-air missile	2 (fire units)	Deployed from 2020.
TriSula-U	Turkey; Czech Republic	Long range SAM system	Retia C2 fire control unit	0 (unknown quantity on order)	Indonesian variant of the Hisar-U system. Battery composed of: 1 × command unit / fire control unit; 1 × long range air surveillance radar; 2 × medium range air surveillance radar; 4 × missile launchers (6 × missiles per launcher); Support vehicles
TriSula-U	Turkey; Czech Republic	Long range SAM system	Retia RL-3DL long range radar	0 (unknown quantity on order)	Indonesian variant of the Hisar-U system. Battery composed of: 1 × command unit / fire control unit; 1 × long range air surveillance radar; 2 × medium range air surveillance radar; 4 × missile launchers (6 × missiles per launcher); Support vehicles
TriSula-U	Turkey; Czech Republic	Long range SAM system	Retia RL-3DM medium range radar	0 (unknown quantity on order)	Indonesian variant of the Hisar-U system. Battery composed of: 1 × command unit / fire control unit; 1 × long range air surveillance radar; 2 × medium range air surveillance radar; 4 × missile launchers (6 × missiles per launcher); Support vehicles
TriSula-U	Turkey; Czech Republic	Long range SAM system	SİPER block 2, surface-to-air missile / anti-ballistic missile (medium to long range)	0 (unknown quantity on order)	Indonesian variant of the Hisar-U system. Battery composed of: 1 × command unit / fire control unit; 1 × long range air surveillance radar; 2 × medium range air surveillance radar; 4 × missile launchers (6 × missiles per launcher); Support vehicles
TriSula-U	Turkey; Czech Republic	Long range SAM system	Tatra T815-7 8×8 trucks for the launch platforms, radar vehicles, command and control vehicles, ammunition transport vehicles, mobile maintenance units	0 (unknown quantity on order)	Indonesian variant of the Hisar-U system. Battery composed of: 1 × command unit / fire control unit; 1 × long range air surveillance radar; 2 × medium range air surveillance radar; 4 × missile launchers (6 × missiles per launcher); Support vehicles
TriSula-O	Turkey	Medium range SAM system	Retia C2 fire control unit	0 (unknown quantity on order)	Indonesian variant of the Hisar-O system. Battery composed of: 1 × command unit / fire control unit; 1 × long range air surveillance radar; 2 × medium range air surveillance radar; 4 × missile launchers (6 × missiles per launcher); Support vehicles
TriSula-O	Turkey	Medium range SAM system	Retia RL-3DL long range radar	0 (unknown quantity on order)	Indonesian variant of the Hisar-O system. Battery composed of: 1 × command unit / fire control unit; 1 × long range air surveillance radar; 2 × medium range air surveillance radar; 4 × missile launchers (6 × missiles per launcher); Support vehicles
TriSula-O	Turkey	Medium range SAM system	Retia RL-3DM medium range radar	0 (unknown quantity on order)	Indonesian variant of the Hisar-O system. Battery composed of: 1 × command unit / fire control unit; 1 × long range air surveillance radar; 2 × medium range air surveillance radar; 4 × missile launchers (6 × missiles per launcher); Support vehicles
TriSula-O	Turkey	Medium range SAM system	Hisar-O surface-to-air missile	0 (unknown quantity on order)	Indonesian variant of the Hisar-O system. Battery composed of: 1 × command unit / fire control unit; 1 × long range air surveillance radar; 2 × medium range air surveillance radar; 4 × missile launchers (6 × missiles per launcher); Support vehicles
TriSula-O	Turkey	Medium range SAM system	Tatra T815-7 8×8 trucks for the launch platforms, radar vehicles, command and control vehicles, ammunition transport vehicles, mobile maintenance units	0 (unknown quantity on order)	Indonesian variant of the Hisar-O system. Battery composed of: 1 × command unit / fire control unit; 1 × long range air surveillance radar; 2 × medium range air surveillance radar; 4 × missile launchers (6 × missiles per launcher); Support vehicles
Man Portable Air Defence System (MANPADS)
QW-3 Vanguard	China	MANPADS	Light anti-air missile	N/A	
QW-3 Vanguard	China	MANPADS	Pick-up equipped with a TH-5711 Smart Hunter radar system and a surveillance module	N/A	
QW-19 Vanguard	China	MANPADS	Light anti-air missile	N/A	
QW-19 Vanguard	China	MANPADS	Shoulder launcher	N/A	
KP-SAM Chiron	South Korea	MANPADS	Light anti-air LIG Nex1missile	N/A	Used in conjunction with the Skyshield anti-aircraft gun system.
KP-SAM Chiron	South Korea	MANPADS	Tripod and launcher	N/A	Used in conjunction with the Skyshield anti-aircraft gun system.
Anti-aircraft gun
Skyshield Mk2	Switzerland	Anti-aircraft gun system	Oerlikon X-TAR3D (container variant) (fire control unit, X-band radar, optical sensor, IFF)	10 (fire units)	Each fire unit is equipped with: 1 fire control and sensor unit; 4 revolver guns; transport trucks; 4 KP-SAM Chiron MANPADS which accompany the Skyshield system to protect itThe system is mobile thanks to trucks, and can be carried by C-130 transport aircraft.
Skyshield Mk2	Switzerland	Anti-aircraft gun system	Oerlikon Mk2 revolver gun (system with 2 × 35×228mm air defence, and optical sensor)	10 (fire units)	Each fire unit is equipped with: 1 fire control and sensor unit; 4 revolver guns; transport trucks; 4 KP-SAM Chiron MANPADS which accompany the Skyshield system to protect itThe system is mobile thanks to trucks, and can be carried by C-130 transport aircraft.
Skyshield Mk2	Switzerland	Anti-aircraft gun system	AHEAD ammunition (Airburst ammunition)	10 (fire units)	Each fire unit is equipped with: 1 fire control and sensor unit; 4 revolver guns; transport trucks; 4 KP-SAM Chiron MANPADS which accompany the Skyshield system to protect itThe system is mobile thanks to trucks, and can be carried by C-130 transport aircraft.
Skyshield Mk2	Switzerland	Anti-aircraft gun system	Hino Ranger 500 FM285 trucks	10 (fire units)	Each fire unit is equipped with: 1 fire control and sensor unit; 4 revolver guns; transport trucks; 4 KP-SAM Chiron MANPADS which accompany the Skyshield system to protect itThe system is mobile thanks to trucks, and can be carried by C-130 transport aircraft.
Zastava M55 A2	Yugoslavia	Towed anti-aircraft gun	3 × 20x110mm cannons	N/A	

==== Planned future air defence systems ====
Planned air defence system to be ordered:

- MSAM-II Cheongung II: Indonesia has issued Letter of Intent for two batteries of KM-SAM Block 2 in June 2026.

=== Air surveillance ===
Model	Origin	Type	In service	Notes
Ground controlled interception / early warning
AR-325 Commander	United Kingdom	Fixed, E / F-Band (IEEE), long range, early warning, 3D radar	≥ 3	
RETIA, a.s.	Czech Republic	Fixed ground controlled interception radar	12	
Selex RAT-31DL/M	Italy	Mobile, L-Band (IEEE), AESA, solid-state, long range, early warning, 3D radar	1	
Thales Ground Master 403	France	Mobile, S-Band (IEEE), AESA, GaN, long range, early warning, 3D radar	13	Indonesia purchased the radars with the Thales SkyView Command and Control system that integrated to the Indonesian Air Operation Centre.
ThalesRaytheonSystem Master-T	France; United States	Mobile, S-Band (IEEE), long range, early warning, 3D radar	8	Data transmission: Thales CRC system with SBM V-Sat Plus II.
Thomson TRS-2215	France	Mobile, S-Band (IEEE), long range, early warning, 3D radar	2	First order in 1978.
Thomson TRS-2230D	France	Fixed, S-Band (IEEE), long range, early warning, 3D radar	10	Same radar as TRS-2215, wider for fixed station, and remote command and control. First order in 1984.
Weibel MFSR-2100/45	Denmark	Mobile, X-band (IEEE), surveillance and tracking, 3D radar	2	
Short range air surveillance
MLAAD-SR	China	Mobile, short-range, 3D radar	16	
Passive radars
VERA-NG	Czech Republic	Passive radar and ESM	N/A	South China sea surveillance (air and sea).

== Ground vehicles ==
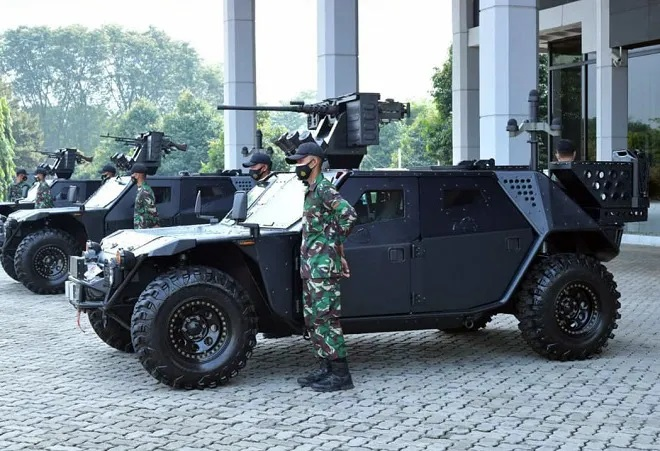
P6 ATAV

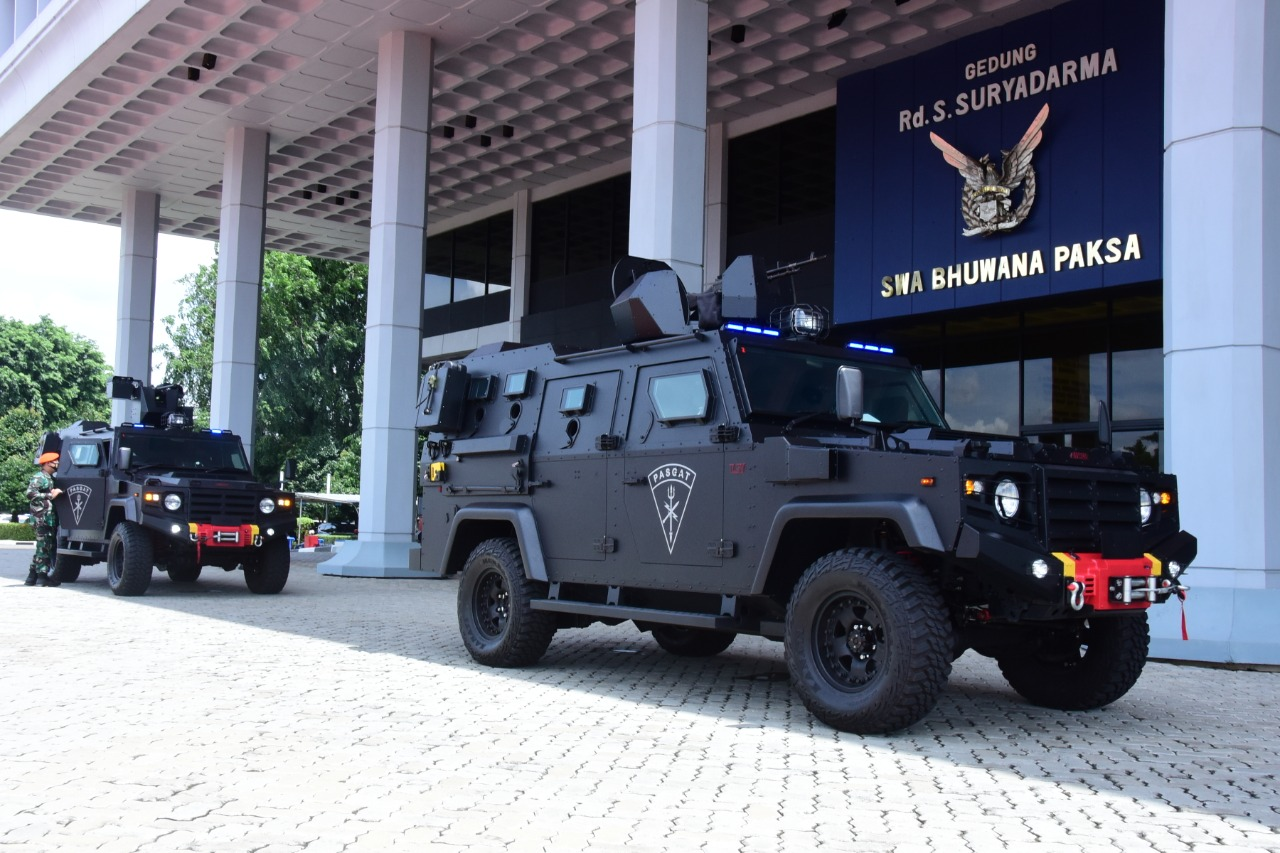
ILSV J-Force Korpasgat

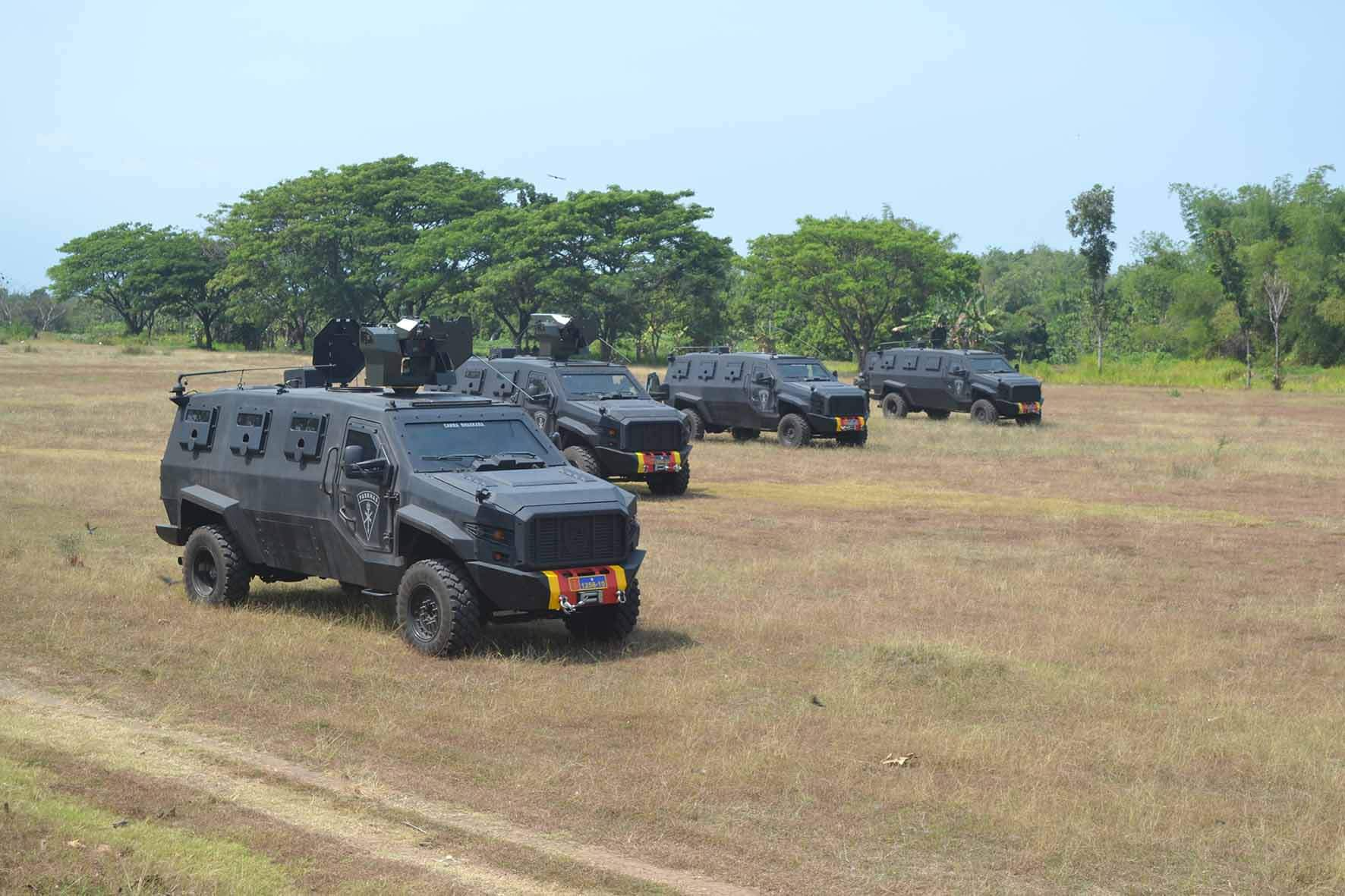
Korpasgat Turangga APC

Model	Origin	Type	In service	Notes
AFV
Pindad APS-3 Anoa	Indonesia	Anoa Command Anoa APC	N/A	
Light armored vehicles
TAD Turangga	Indonesia	–	N/A	Built by Karya Tugas Anda (TAD Defence)
J-Forces ILSV	Indonesia	Armored variant	N/A	Built by J-Forces
SSE P2	Indonesia	Commando II	N/A	
SSE P2 Tiger	Indonesia	–	N/A	Built by Sentra Surya Ekajaya (SSE Defence)
SSE P6 ATAV	Indonesia	P6 ATAV V3 (armoured)	N/A	Built by Sentra Surya Ekajaya (SSE Defence)
IAe/SSE DMV-30	Indonesia	DMV-30T DMV-30A	N/A	Built by Indonesian Aerospace and Sentra Surya Ekajaya (SSE Defence)
Utility vehicles
Pindad Maung	Indonesia	MV3	100	
Toyota Hilux	Japan	Hilux LSV	N/A	

== Small arms ==
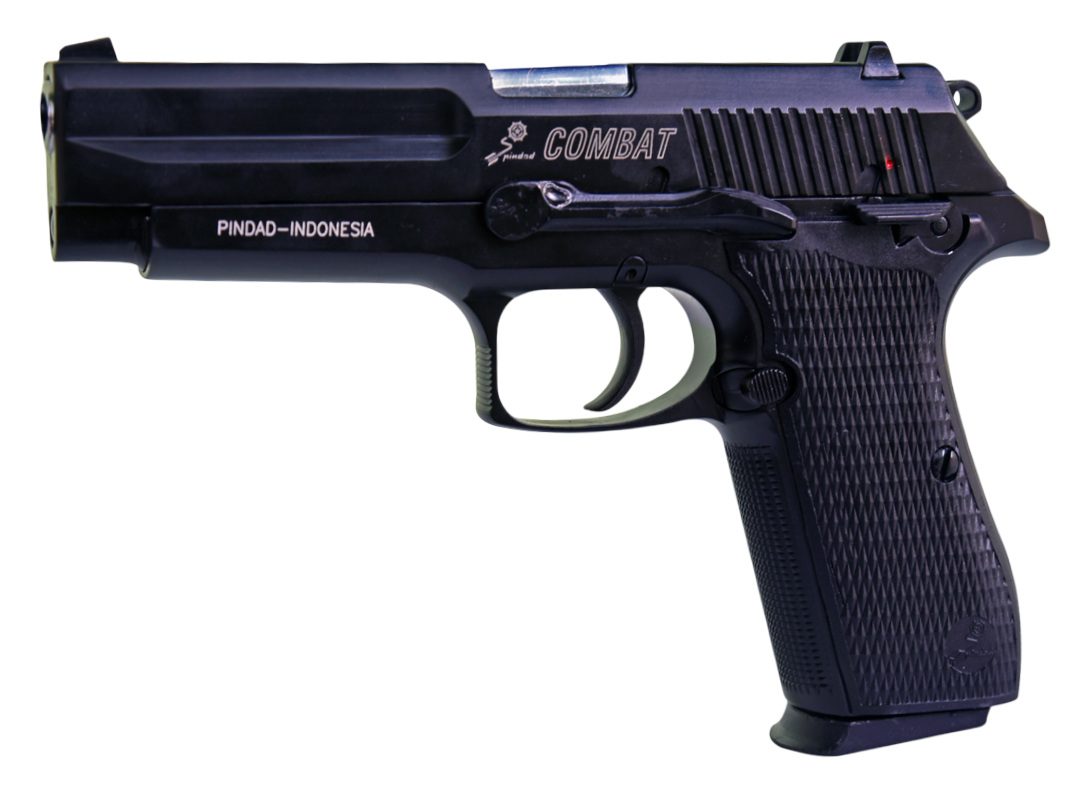
Pindad G2 Combat

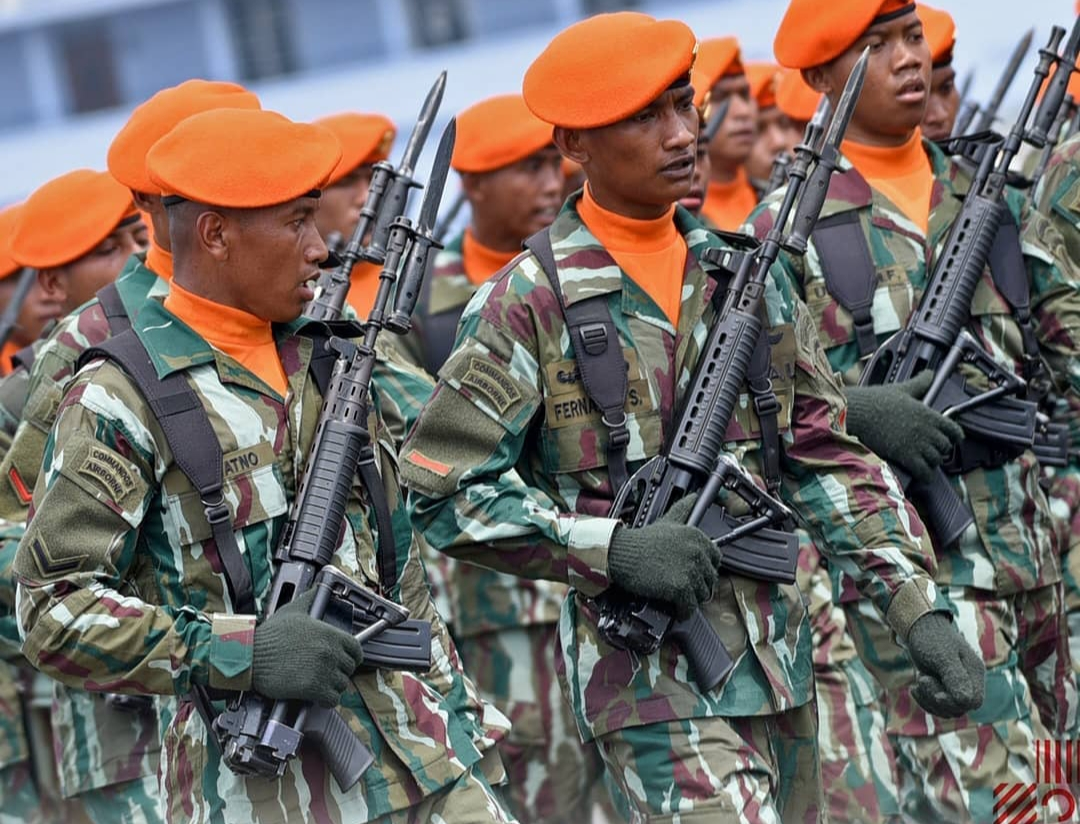
Korpasgat soldiers marching with Pindad SS1-V1 (left) and SS2-V4 (middle and right) assault rifle.

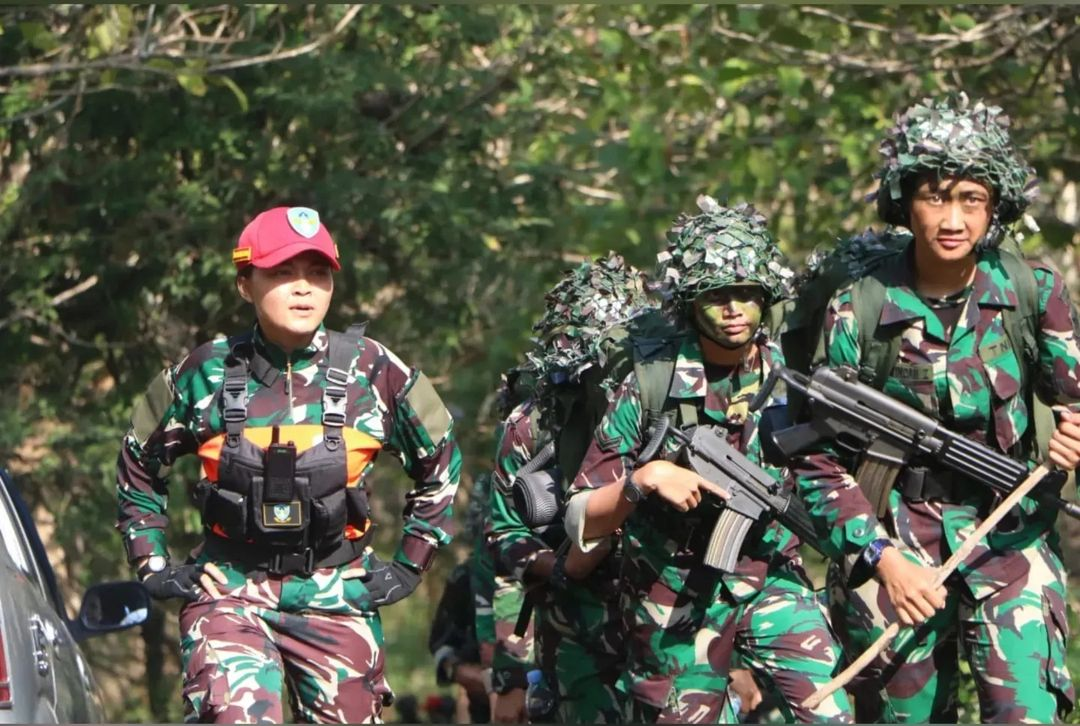
Military Police with Daewoo K1 carbines

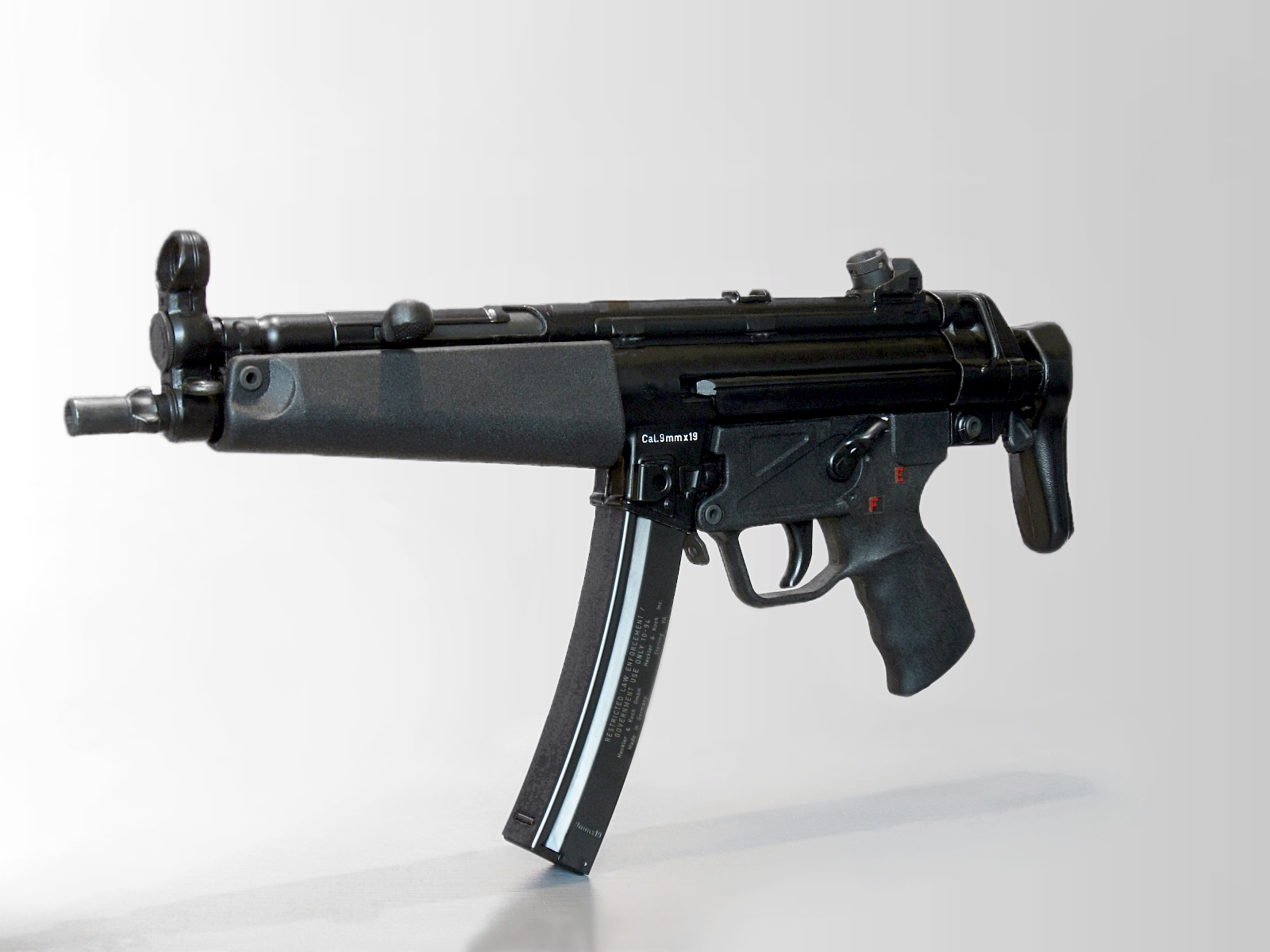
MP5 submachine gun

Model	Origin	Type	Calibre	Variant	Notes
Handguns
Pindad G2	Indonesia	Semi-automatic pistol	9×19mm Parabellum	G2 Combat	Standard issued sidearms.
Pindad G2	Indonesia	Semi-automatic pistol	9×19mm Parabellum	G2 Elite	Standard issued sidearms.
Beretta 92	Italy	Semi-automatic pistol	9×19mm Parabellum	92FS	Used by Korpasgat
Glock	Austria	Semi-automatic pistol	9×19mm Parabellum	Glock 17	
Glock	Austria	Semi-automatic pistol	9×19mm Parabellum	Glock 18	
Glock	Austria	Semi-automatic pistol	9×19mm Parabellum	Glock 19	
Glock	Austria	Semi-automatic pistol	9×19mm Parabellum	Glock 26	
Glock	Austria	Semi-automatic pistol	9×19mm Parabellum	Glock 34	
Glock	Austria	Semi-automatic pistol	.40 S&W	Glock 23	
Glock	Austria	Semi-automatic pistol	.40 S&W	Glock 27	
Glock	Austria	Semi-automatic pistol	.380 ACP	Glock 42	
Sig P226	Switzerland	Semi-automatic pistol	9×19mm Parabellum	P226	Used by Korpasgat
Sig P226	Switzerland	Semi-automatic pistol	9×19mm Parabellum	P228	Used by Korpasgat
SIG Sauer P320	United States	Semi-automatic pistol	9×19mm Parabellum	–	Used by Korpasgat
Zastava CZ99	Yugoslavia	Semi-automatic pistol	9×19mm Parabellum	CZ99	Used by Korpasgat.
Submachine guns
HK MP5	Germany	Submachine gun	9×19mm Parabellum	MP5K-PDW	Used by Bravo Detachment 90.
HK MP5	Germany	Submachine gun	9×19mm Parabellum	MP5-SD	Used by Bravo Detachment 90.
SIG MPX	United States	Submachine gun	9×19mm Parabellum	–	Used by Korpasgat.
Shotguns
Benelli M4	Italy	Semi-automatic combat shotgun	12-gauge	Super 90	Used by Bravo Detachment 90.
Assault rifles / Carbines
Pindad SS1	Indonesia	Assault rifle	5.56×45mm NATO	SS1-V1	Standard issued assault rifles.
Pindad SS1	Indonesia	Assault rifle	5.56×45mm NATO	SS1-V2	Standard issued assault rifles.
Pindad SS2	Indonesia	Assault rifle	5.56×45mm NATO	SS2-V1	Standard issued, gradually to replace the remaining SS1 in service.
Pindad SS2	Indonesia	Assault rifle	5.56×45mm NATO	SS2-V2	Standard issued, gradually to replace the remaining SS1 in service.
Pindad SS2	Indonesia	Assault rifle	5.56×45mm NATO	SS2-V4	Standard issued, gradually to replace the remaining SS1 in service.
Pindad SS2	Indonesia	Assault rifle	5.56×45mm NATO	SS2-V4HB	Standard issued, gradually to replace the remaining SS1 in service.
Heckler & Koch G36	Germany	Assault rifle	5.56×45mm NATO	G36C	Used by Bravo Detachment 90.
Heckler & Koch HK416	Germany	Assault rifle	5.56×45mm NATO	HK416	Used by Bravo Detachment 90.
IWI Tavor X95	Israel	Bullpup assault rifle	5.56×45mm NATO	X95 330	Used by Korpasgat.
SAR 21	Singapore	Bullpup assault rifle	5.56×45mm NATO		
Malyuk	Ukraine	Bullpup assault rifle	7.62×39mm		Used by Korpasgat.
Daewoo K1	South Korea	Carbine	5.56×45mm NATO	K1A	
Dasan DSAR-15	South Korea	Carbine	5.56×45mm NATO	DSAR-15P	Used by Bravo Detachment 90.
SIG 516	United States	Carbine	5.56×45mm NATO	SIG 516 CQB	Used by Korpasgat
SIG MCX	United States	Carbine	5.56×45mm NATO	Virtus SBR	Used by Korpasgat.
Battle rifles
Heckler & Koch G3	Germany	Battle rifle	7.62×51mm NATO	–	
Machine guns
FN Minimi	Belgium; Indonesia	Light machine gun	5.56×45mm NATO	Pindad SM3	Standard issued.
RPD	Soviet Union	Light machine gun	7.62×39mm	–	
FN MAG	Belgium; Indonesia	General-purpose machine gun	7.62×51mm NATO	Pindad SM2	Standard issued.
M60	United States	General-purpose machine gun	7.62×51mm NATO	–	
M134 Minigun	United States	Gatling-type machine gun	7.62×51mm NATO	–	
M2 Browning	United States; Indonesia	Heavy machine gun	12.7×99mm NATO	Pindad SMB-2	Standard issued.
DShK	Soviet Union	Heavy machine gun	12.7x108mm		
Precision rifles
Accuracy International Arctic Warfare	United Kingdom	Bolt action sniper rifle	7.62×51mm NATO	AX308	
Surgeon CSR	United States	Bolt action sniper rifle	7.62×51mm NATO	–	Uses by Bravo Detachment 90.
Accuracy International AW50	United Kingdom	Anti-materiel rifle	12.7×99mm NATO	AW50	
Barett M82	United States	Anti-materiel rifle	12.7×99mm NATO	M82A1	
PGM Hécate II	France	Anti-materiel rifle	12.7×99mm NATO	FR-12.7	
Denel NTW-20		Anti-materiel rifle	20×82mm	–	Used by Korpasgat.
Grenades and grenade launchers
M203	United States; Indonesia	Under barrel grenade launcher	40×46mm LV	SPG	Standard issued.
Anti-tank weapons
C90-CR	Spain	Rocket-propelled grenade	90mm	–	
M80 Zolja	Serbia	Rocket-propelled grenade	64mm	–	
Mortars
Commando Mortar	Indonesia	Infantry light mortar	40mm	–	
Pindad Mo-1 Mortar	Indonesia	Infantry light mortar	60mm	–	
Pindad Mo-2 Mortar	Indonesia	Infantry light mortar	60mm	Long range	
Pindad Mo-3 Mortar	Indonesia		81mm	–	

== Retired aircraft ==
Below is a list of some notable aircraft previous operated by the Armed Forces of Indonesia.

Extended content
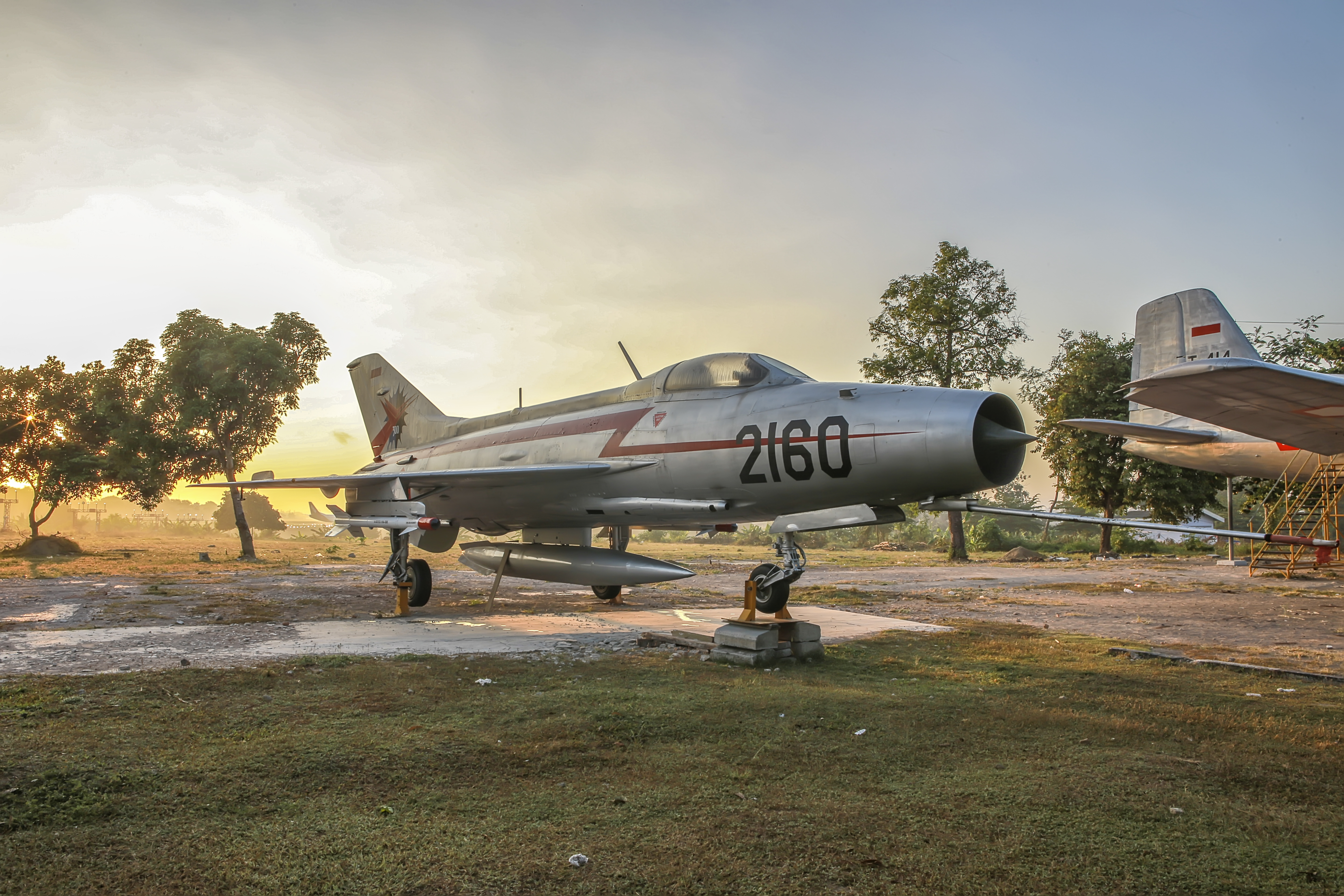
MiG-21F-13 Fishbed C

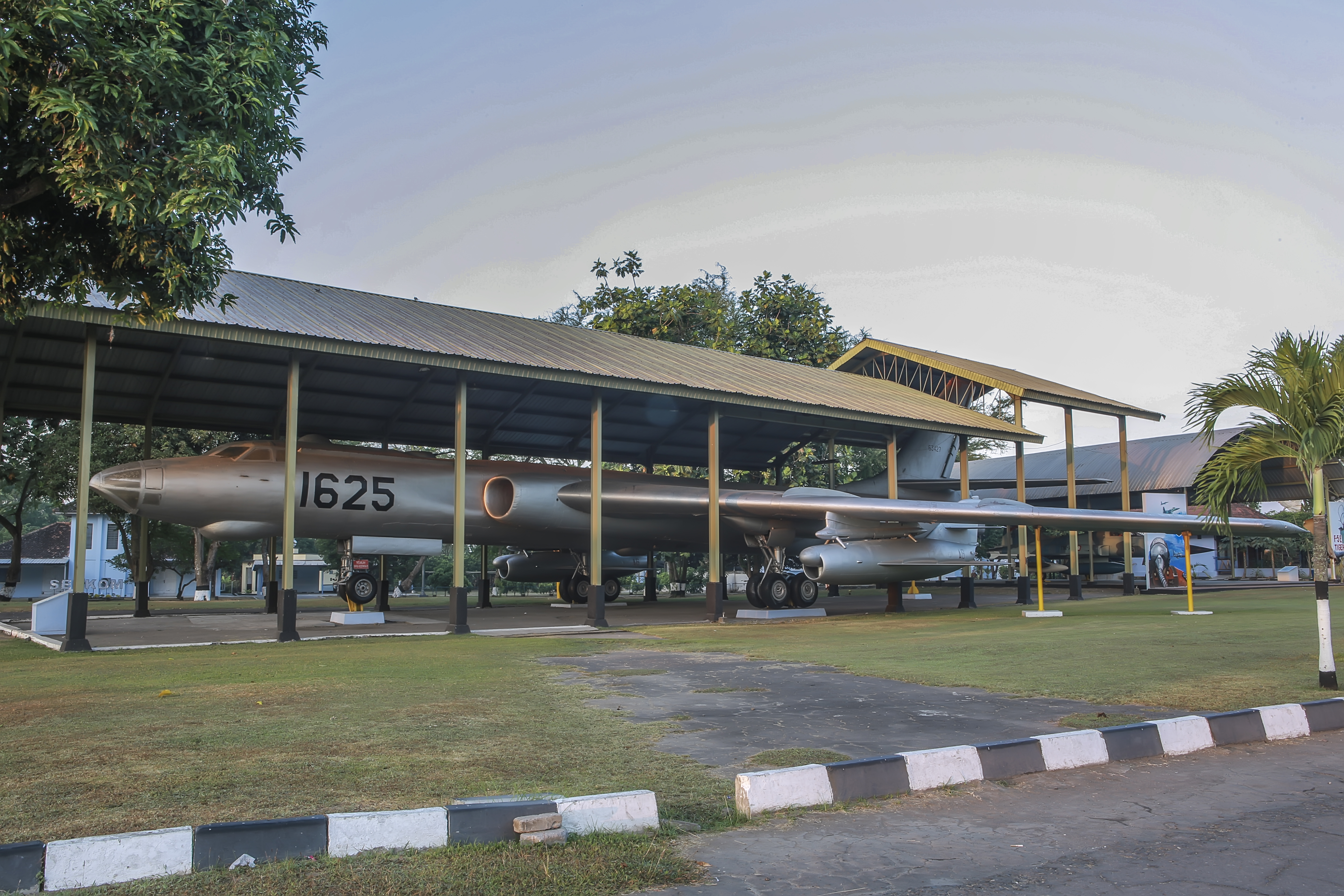
Tupolev-TU-16B KS

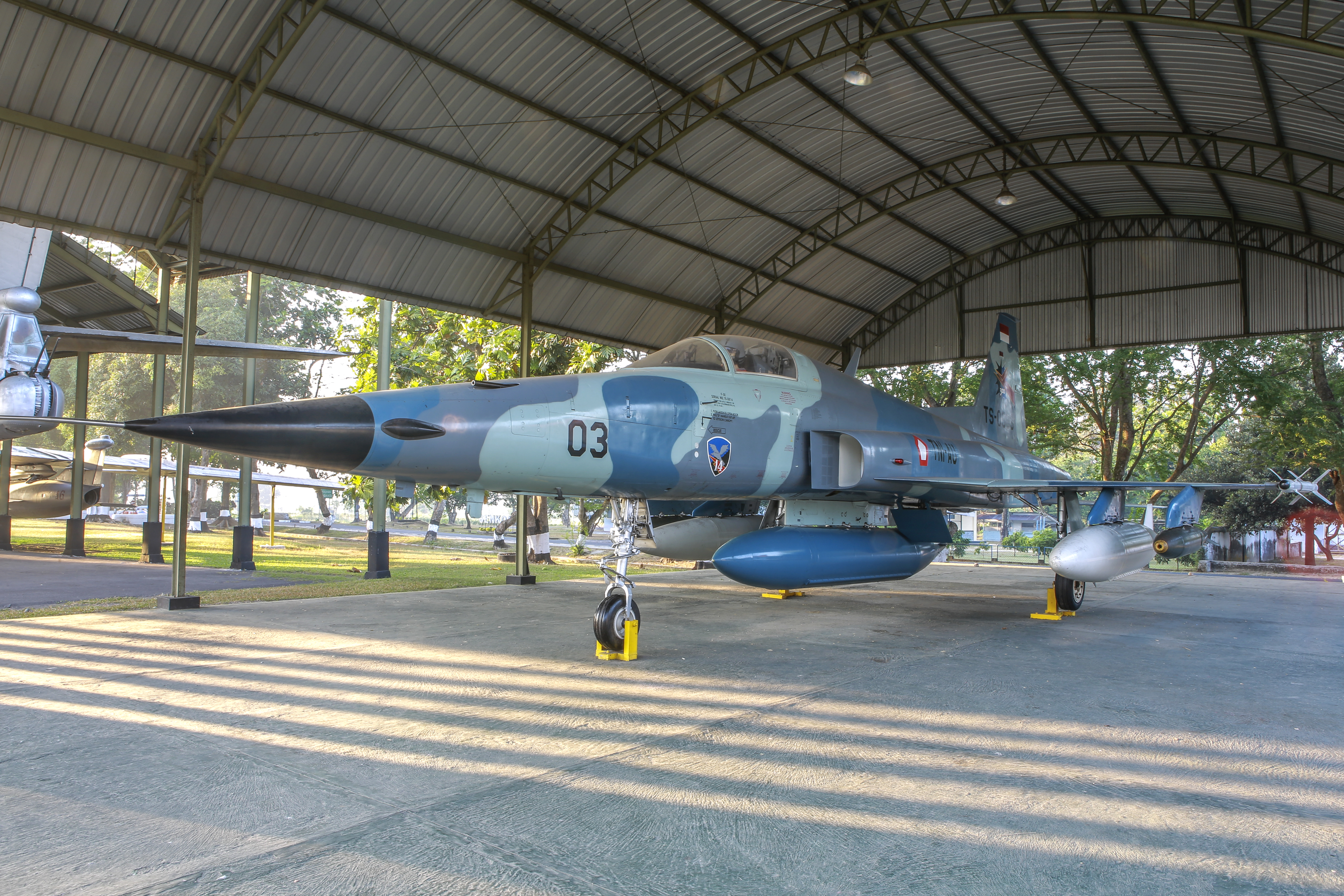
F-5E Tiger II fighter jet

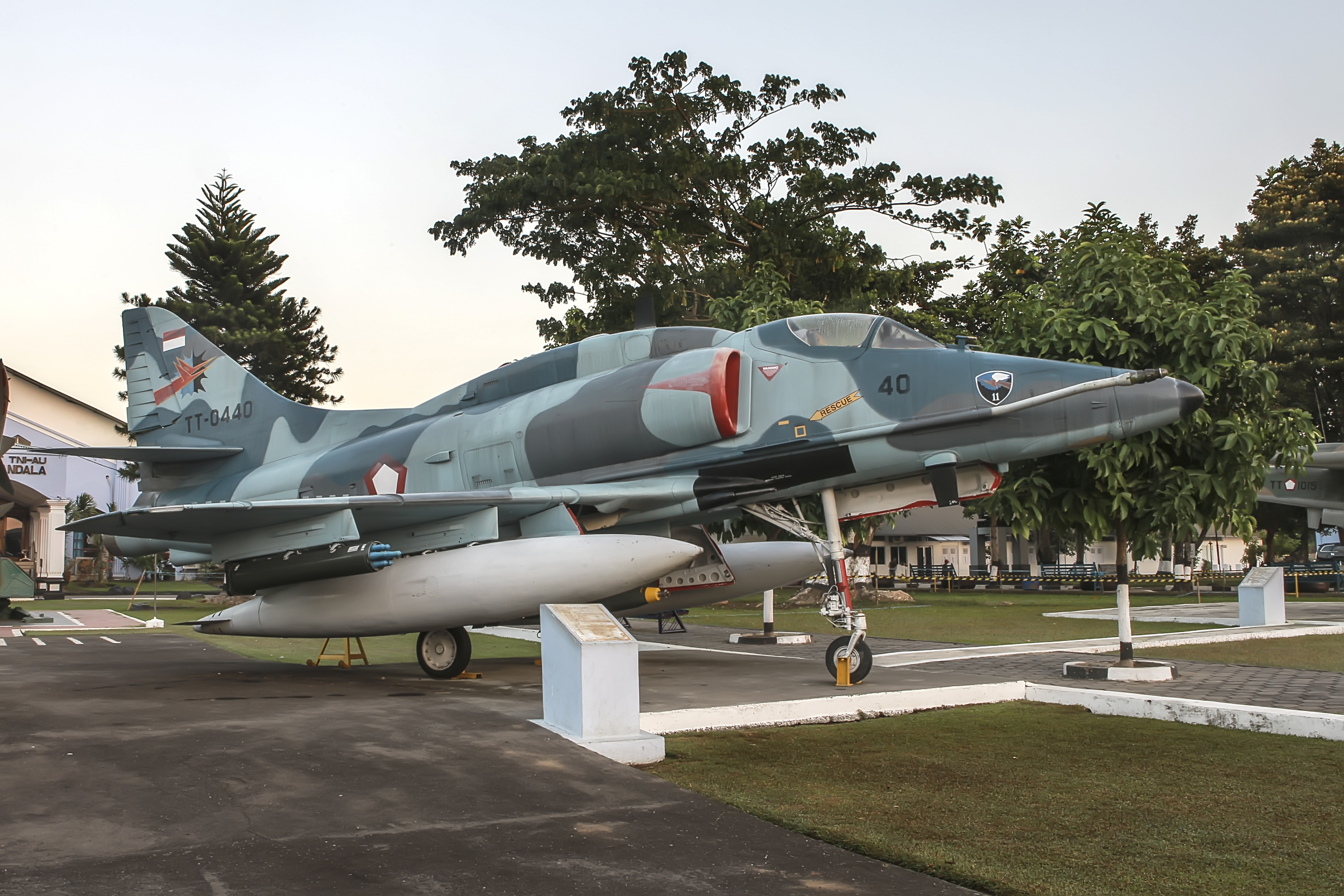
McDonnell Douglas A-4 Skyhawk at the Dirgantara Mandala Museum

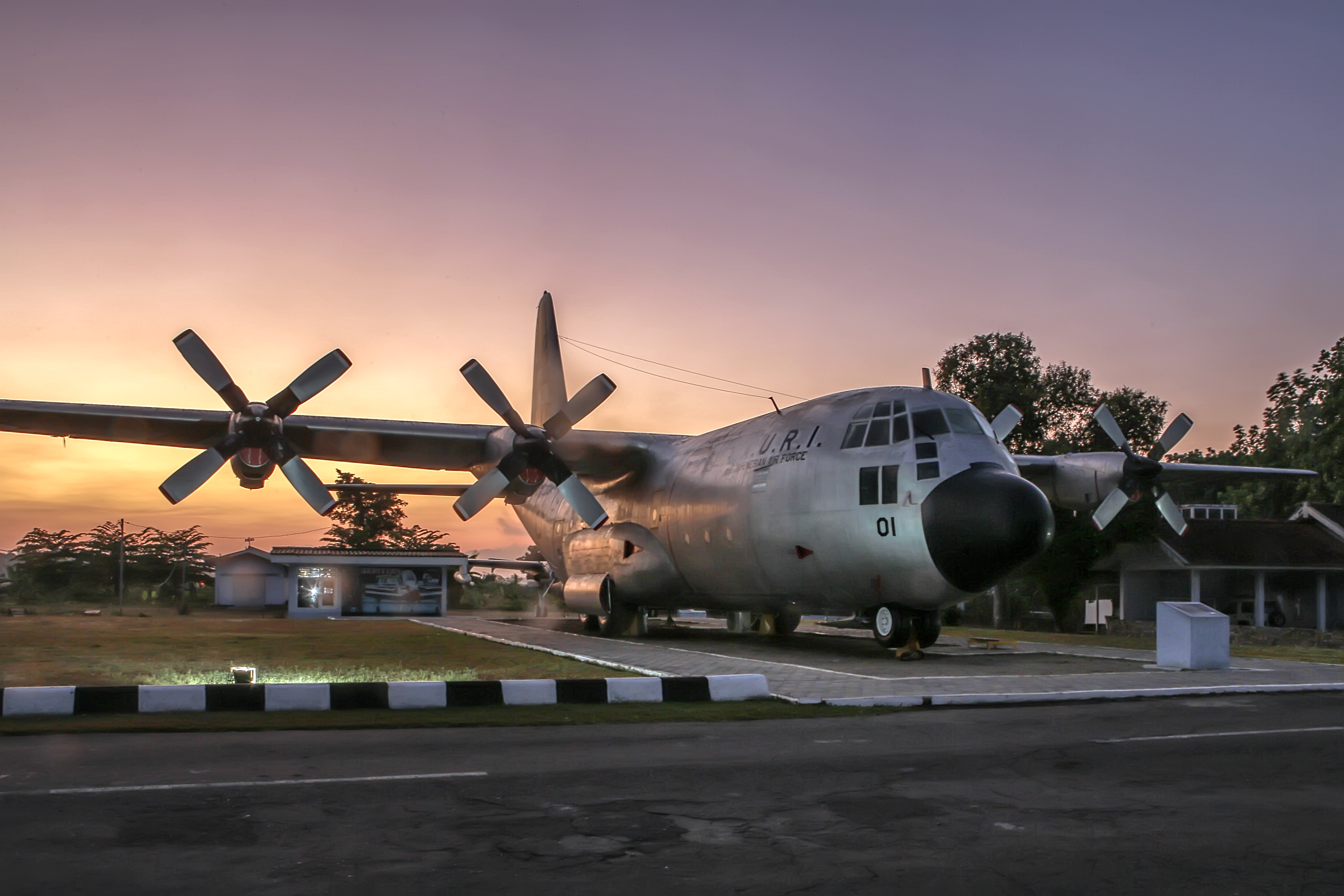
The air force's first C-130B Hercules aircraft

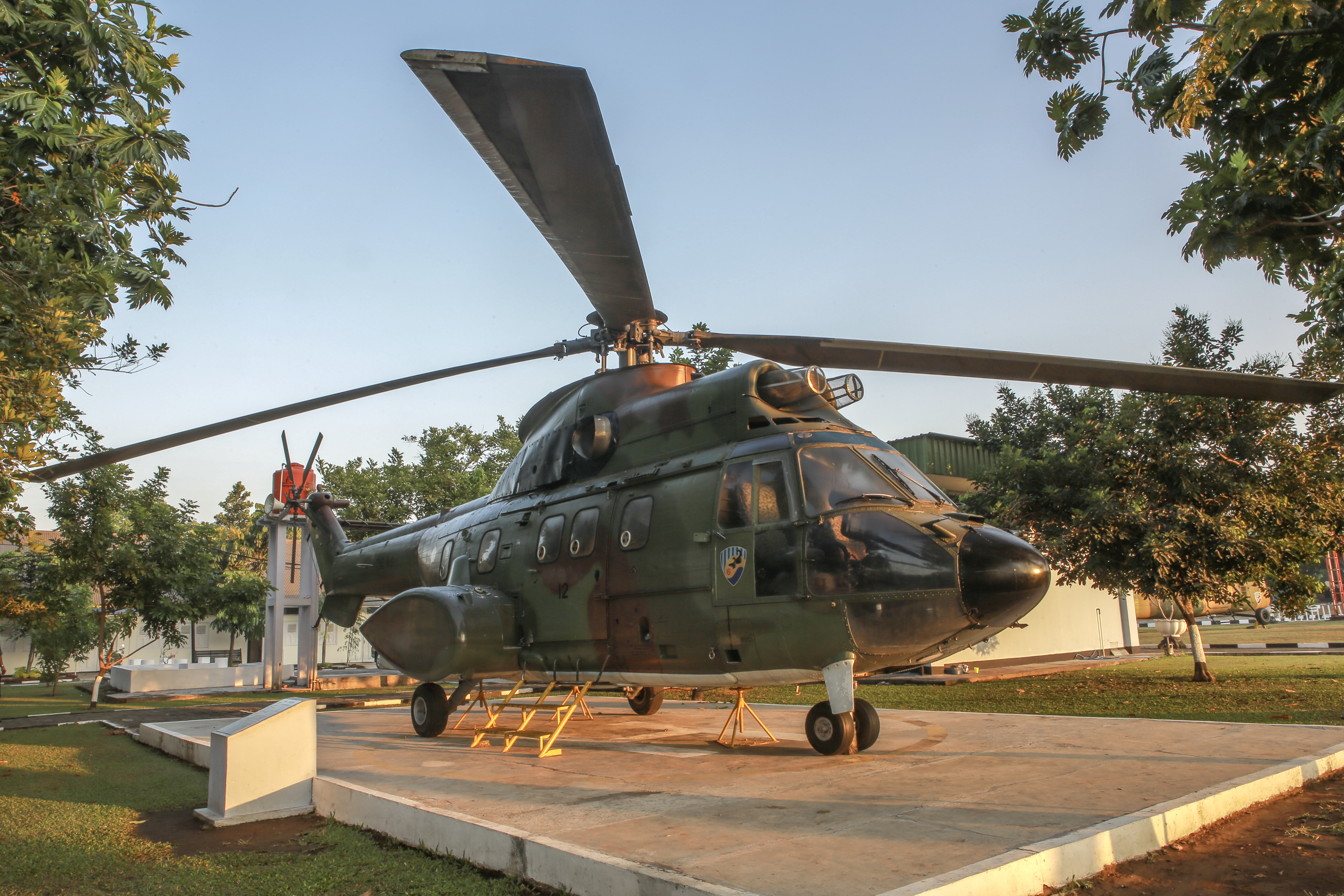
NAS-332 Super Puma helicopter

Aircraft	Origin	Type	Variant	In service	Notes
Combat aircraft
AC-47 Spooky	United States	Close air support gunship		2	Armed with 3x 12.7mm AN/M3 Browning HMG. It was replaced by OV-10 Bronco and converted into transport aircraft.
A-4 Skyhawk	United States	Fighter	A-4E	31	
B-25 Mitchell	United States	Bomber	C/D/J	42	Ex Royal Netherlands East Indies Army Air Force
B-26 Invader	United States	Bomber	A-26B	6	Supplied by United States under the Mutual Assistance Program.
BAE Hawk	United Kingdom	Light attack aircraft / Lead-in fighter trainer	Hawk 53	20	Replaced by the KAI T-50i Golden Eagle
Bristol Blenheim	United Kingdom	Bomber	Mk IV	1	It was re-engined with Nakajima Sakae engines.
CAC Sabre	Australia	Fighter	Mk.32	23	Variant of the F-86, 24 were delivered, 1 crashed on delivery flight
Ilyushin Il-10	Soviet Union	Attack	Avia B-33	14	Czechoslovak-built B-33. Supplied by Poland, returned to Poland due to poor performance.
Ilyushin Il-28	Soviet Union	Bomber		32	Czechoslovak-built B-228
Kawasaki Ki-48	Japan	Bomber		N/A	Nicknamed "Diponegoro II". At least an aircraft were in service between 1945 and 1948.
Kawasaki Ki-61	Japan	Fighter		N/A	Estimated 6 aircraft were in service in 1946.
Kawanishi N1K	Japan	Floatplane fighter	N1K1	N/A	Estimated 4 aircraft were obtained.
Lavochkin La-11	Soviet Union	Fighter		24	Supplied by People's Republic of China
MiG-17	Soviet Union	Fighter	MiG-17F; MiG-17PF	70	30 units were Czechoslovak-built S-104 and 40 were Polish-built Lim-5P
MiG-19	Soviet Union	Fighter	MiG-19S	35	
MiG-21	Soviet Union	Fighter	MiG-21F-13	26	
Mitsubishi Ki-51	Japan	Bomber		N/A	Nicknamed "Guntei". Estimated 8 aircraft were in service between 1945 and 1949.
Nakajima A6M2-N	Japan	Interceptor / fighter-bomber		N/A	Approximately one or more were obtained
Nakajima B5N	Japan	Torpedo bomber		N/A	Approximately one or more were obtained
Nakajima B6N	Japan	Torpedo bomber		N/A	Approximately one or more were obtained
Nakajima Ki-27	Japan	Fighter		N/A	At least one was known to be in service.
Nakajima Ki-43	Japan	Fighter	Ki-43-II	N/A	Estimated 11 aircraft were in service between 1945 and 1949.
Nakajima Ki-49	Japan	Bomber		N/A	Nicknamed "Diponegoro I". Estimated 2 aircraft were in service between 1945 and 1947.
Northrop F-5	United States	Multirole	F-5E/F Tiger II	16	12 F-5E and 4 F-5F - retired from service
OV-10 Bronco	United States	COIN / surveillance	OV-10F	16	Replaced by the EMB 314 Super Tucano
P-51 Mustang	United States	Fighter-bomber	P-51D/K; Cavalier Mustang II	49	Consisted of ex ML-KNIL P-51D/K and US-supplied Cavalier Mustang II under the Peace Pony programs.
Shenyang J-5	China	Fighter	Type 56	12	
Tupolev Tu-2	Soviet Union	Bomber		12	Supplied by People's Republic of China
Tupolev Tu-16	Soviet Union	Strategic bomber / reconnaissance	Tu-16; Tu-16KS-1 Tu-16R	26	12 Tu-16, 12 Tu-16KS-1, and 2 Tu-16R
Special mission
Cessna 188	United States	Agricultural	188 AgTruck	4	
Grumman HU-16 Albatross	United States	SAR / utility	UF-1	10	Amphibious
Kawanishi H6K	Japan	Flying boat / transport	H6K2-L	1	
Mitsubishi F1M	Japan	Reconnaissance floatplane	F1M2	N/A	
Mitsubishi Ki-46	Japan	Reconnaissance aircraft		N/A	Approximately 21 or more aircraft were obtained
PBY Catalina	United States	SAR / utility	PBY-5A	8	Amphibious aircraft
Pilatus PC-6 Porter	Switzerland	Agricultural	PC-6/B2-H2	5	
Yokosuka E14Y	Japan	Reconnaissance floatplane		N/A	
Transport
Antonov An-12	Soviet Union	Military transport	An-12B	9	
Boeing 707	United States	VIP transport	707-3M1C	1	Ex Pelita Air
Cessna 180	United States	Utility		6	
Cessna 185	United States	Utility		1	
Cessna 206	United States	Utility	T207	5	
Cessna 402	United States	Utility	401A; 402A	7	Five 401A and two 402A
de Havilland Canada DHC-2	Canada	Utility / military transport		1	STOL capable aircraft
de Havilland Canada DHC-3	Canada	Military transport		5	STOL capable aircraft
Douglas C-47	United States	Military transport	C-47A; C-47B	21	
Fokker F27	Netherlands	Military transport	F27-400M	8	
Fokker F28	Netherlands	VIP transport	1000; 3000R; 4000	4	All of the aircraft were ex commercial airliner. (Note: F28-1000 (A-2801) ex Pelita Air; F28-3000R (A-2802 and A-2803) ex Garuda Indonesia; F28-4000 (A-2804) ex Transwisata Prima Aviation) Retired completely in 2017/2018
G-21 Goose	United States	Utility		2	Acquired from Shell in 1957.
HU-16 Albatross	United States	SAR / utility	UF-1	10	Amphibious aircraft
Ilyushin Il-14	Soviet Union	Military transport	Avia-14F	28	Czechoslovak-built Avia 14
Interstate Cadet	United States	Light utility	L-4J	63	
L-12 Electra Junior	United States	Military transport	L-12A	7	Ex Royal Netherlands East Indies Army Air Force
Lockheed C-140 Jetstar	United States	VIP transport	JetStar 6	3	T-1645 "Pancasila", T-17845 "Irian", T-9446 "Sapta Marga"
Lockheed Model 18	United States	Military transport	C-60	10	Handed over upon independence from the Netherlands
Lockheed Super Constellation	United States	VIP transport	L-1049C/H	3	
Mitsubishi Ki-57	Japan	Military transport		N/A	Approximately 3 aircraft were obtained
Noorduyn Norseman	Canada	Utility	UC-64A	1	Ex Royal Netherlands East Indies Army Air Force (Note: c/n 536, Ex USAAF 44-70271, Ex PK-SAM, Ex ML-KNIL T-400)
PA-22 Tri-Pacer	United States	Utility	PA-22-125	N/A	
PA-32 Cherokee	United States	Utility		N/A	
Scottish Aviation Twin Pioneer	United Kingdom	Military transport	Twin Pioneer Series 1	12	Ex Royal Malaysian Air Force
Short SC.7 Skyvan	United Kingdom	Military transport	Skyvan 3M-400	3	
Taylorcraft Auster	United Kingdom	Liaison	Mk III	22	Ex Royal Netherlands East Indies Army Air Force
Helicopters
Aérospatiale SA 321 Super Frelon	France	Transport	SA 321J	1	Was operated by Pelita Air Service.
Aérospatiale SA 330 Puma	France / Indonesia	Transport	NAS 330J	18	Licensed built by Indonesian Aerospace
Bell 47	United States	Utility	Bell 47G-3B-1 "Soloy"	12	
Bell 47	United States	Utility	47J2A Ranger	4	
Bell 204	United States	Utility	Bell 204B	2	
Bell 206	United States	Liaison		2	
Hiller 12	United States	Utility	Hiller 360B	10	
Hughes 500	United States	Utility	500C	12	Ex Pelita Air.
Mil Mi-1	Soviet Union	Utility		8	Polish-built SM-1
Mil Mi-2	Russia	Utility		2	Retired from service
Mil Mi-4	Soviet Union	Utility	Mi-4A	26	
Mil Mi-6	Soviet Union	Transport	Mi-6T	8	
Sikorsky H-34	United States	Transport	VH-34D; UH-34D; UH-34G S-58T	16	A VH-34D were acquired in 1961 as VIP helicopter. Seven UH-34D and three UH-34G ex VNAF were acquired in 1970s. All but three H-34 were converted into S-58T in late 1970's. Further five S-58T were acquired in early 1980's
Sikorsky SH-3 Sea King	United States	VIP transport	S-61V-1	1	Presidential helicopter
Trainer aircraft
A-4 Skyhawk	United States	Conversion trainer	TA-4H/J	4	2 TA-4H and 2 TA-4J were obtained from Israel and United States respectively.
Aero L-29 Delfín	Czechoslovakia	Lead-in fighter trainer		18	
Antonov An-2	Soviet Union	Conversion trainer		1	In service with Indonesian Aero Sport Federation (FASI)
Beechcraft T-34	United States	Advanced trainer	B45; T-34C	40; 25	Forty Model B45 were acquired in 1962-64. Sixteen T-34C were acquired in 1978, while further nine in 1984.
de Havilland Vampire	United Kingdom	Conversion trainer	T.55	8	
FFA AS 202 Bravo	Switzerland	Ab initio trainer	AS 202/18A	40	
Il-28	Soviet Union	Advanced trainer	Il-28U	4	
L-4 Grasshopper	United States	Basic trainer / liaison aircraft	L-4J	63	Ex Royal Netherlands East Indies Army Air Force
LIPNUR Belalang	Indonesia	Basic trainer	NU-90	3	Used briefly by Indonesian Air Force Academy
Mansyu Ki-79	Manchukuo	Basic trainer / liaison aircraft	Ki-79b	N/A	Nicknamed "Nishikoren". At least 9 aircraft were in service between 1945 and 1949.
MiG-15	Soviet Union	Conversion trainer	MiG-15UTI	15	Czechoslovak-built CS-102
North American T-6 Harvard	United States	Advanced trainer	AT-16; T-6G	16; 25	The AT-16s were ex Royal Netherlands East Indies Army Air Force. Twenty five T-6G were bought from US in 1950.
Lockheed T-33	United States	Advanced trainer / light attack aircraft	T-33A	12	
Pazmany PL-1	United States	Ab initio trainer	PL-2	30	Locally-built as Lipnur LT-200
PZL-104 Wilga	Poland	Basic trainer / utility	Wilga 32	18	Locally-built as Lipnur Gelatik
PZL TS-8 Bies	Poland	Basic trainer		2	
SIAI-Marchetti SF.260	Italy	Advanced trainer	SF.260M/W	18	Received from RSAF
Tachikawa Ki-9	Japan	Advanced trainer		N/A	Approximately 6 aircraft were obtained
Tachikawa Ki-55	Japan	Advanced trainer		N/A	Nicknamed "Cukiu". At least 25 aircraft were in service between 1945 and 1949.
Vultee BT-13 Valiant	United States	Basic trainer		45	
Yokosuka K5Y	Japan	Advanced trainer / bomber	K5Y1	N/A	Nicknamed "Cureng". At least 20 aircraft were in service between 1945 and 1949.

== See also ==
- List of equipment of the Indonesian Army
- List of equipment of the Indonesian Navy
- List of equipment of the Indonesian National Police
- List of aircraft of the Indonesian National Armed Forces

== Bibliography ==
- Bowers, Peter M. (1989). Boeing Aircraft Since 1916. Annapolis, Md.: Naval Institute Press. ISBN 978-0-87021-037-2.
