= P-100 Bomb =

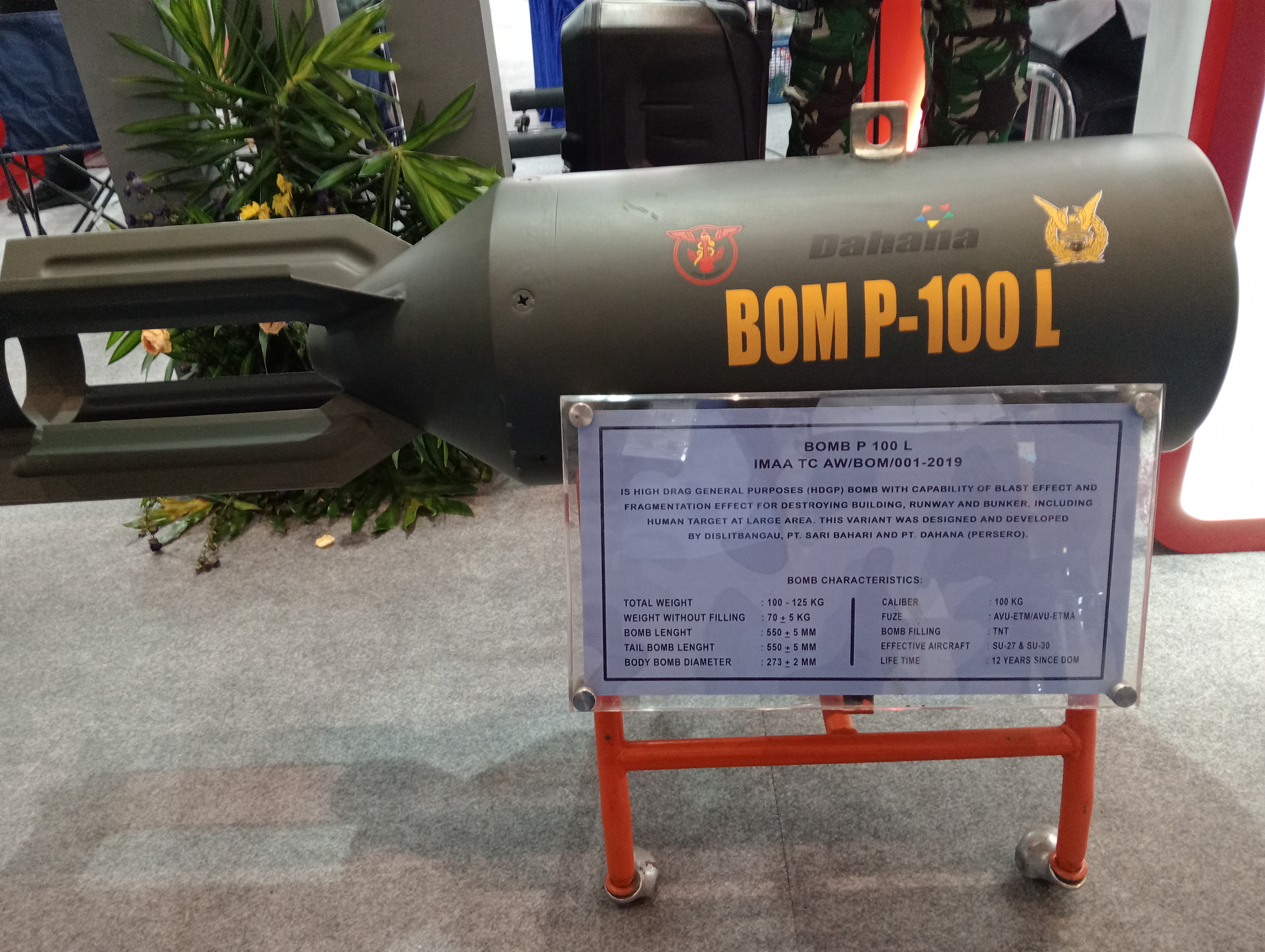
- A P-100 Live bomb displayed at the Indo Defence 2024 exhibition.
- Type: Low-drag general-purpose bomb
- Place of origin: Indonesia

Service history
- Used by: Indonesia; Vietnam

Production history
- Manufacturer: Sari Bahari (Casing); Dahana (Explosives)
- Variants: P-100P (Practice), P-100L (Live)

Specifications
- Mass: 100 to 125 kg (220 to 276 lb)
- Length: 1.1 m (43 in)
- Diameter: 273 mm (10.7 in)
- Filling: TNT (Live variant); Smoke (Practice variant)
- Filling weight: 43 kg (95 lb)
- Detonation mechanism: Nose fuse

The P-100 is a 100 kg unguided, low-drag general-purpose bomb developed in Indonesia. It is designed primarily for use on Russian-standard combat aircraft to engage surface targets during air-to-ground operations or for training purposes.

The bomb is part of the "P Series" family, developed through a partnership between Sari Bahari, which manufactures the bomb casing, and Dahana, which provides the explosive filling. The P-100 is the smallest variant in the P Series family, which also includes the P-250 and P-500 models.

== Variants ==
- P-100P (Practice)

The P-100 Practice bomb is used for pilot training on Russian-standard fighter aircraft. It is designed without a live fuse and emits thick white smoke upon impact, allowing pilots and instructors to verify the accuracy of bombing runs.

- P-100L (Live)

The P-100 Live is the high-explosive version of the bomb. It shares the same aerodynamic characteristics and weight as the practice variant but contains 43 kg of live explosives. It is intended for neutralizing personnel, destroying buildings, and damaging bunker foundations over a wide area.

== Operators ==
Indonesia

The Indonesian Air Force utilizes both Live and Practice variants for its Russian-made fleet, specifically the Sukhoi Su-27 and Sukhoi Su-30.

Vietnam

In August 2023, Sari Bahari completed its first export of 500 units of the P-100P (Practice) to the Vietnam People's Air Force (VPAF). The bombs were successfully tested on Vietnamese Su-30 aircraft.

== See also ==
=== Related Sari Bahari Products ===
- P-250 Bomb
- P-500 Bomb
- Petir V-101 – A surface-to-surface cruise missile co-developed with the Ministry of Defence.
- BNL-250

=== Comparable weapons ===
- Mark 81 bomb (United States)
- OFAB-100-120 (Russia)
