= Radar homing =

Radar homing may refer to:

- Active radar homing
- Semi-active radar homing

== See also ==
- Radar lock-on
