= OFAB-100-120 =

Soviet/Russian aerial bomb

Outline sketch of the OFAB-100-120

The OFAB-100-120 is a small bomb that can be carried on the Sukhoi Su-17, Sukhoi Su-25, MiG-29, Su-27, Sukhoi Su-30 and various other aircraft.

== Purpose ==
This bomb is designed to engage lightly armored materiel and military industrial facilities, as well as manpower. It is dropped from altitudes of 500 to 15,000 m at a speed of 500 to 1,150 km/h. This aircraft bomb is effective against personnel in open terrain and motorized infantry at the reserves concentration base either on the march or in battle array. It is filled with fragments and powerful explosive compositions based on TNT/RDX. The design of this aircraft bomb provides for better fragments distribution in the fragments flight area and high density of the fragmentation zone within the lethal range as compared to general-purpose munitions. Aircraft can carry this bomb with a single-point suspension bomb rack or on 14” NATO standard suspension systems, using the corresponding fuze type.

On 26 April 2024, 6 photos surfaced online, taken somewhere in Russia, which appeared to show a crashed Swift 2 fitted with a single OFAB-100-120 bomb in a centreline type rack. Along with other equipment to allow for it to become a “remotely piloted bomber”. Skyranger had been contacted and said it could be an existing aircraft or one built from a kit worth $55,000.00. Ukraine has previously modified a Aeroprakt A-22 Foxbat into a kamikaze drone.

== Technical characteristics ==
- Caliber, 100 kg
- Length, 1065mm
- Body Diameter, ø273mm
- Tail fin span, 345mm
- Characteristic time, s 21,10/6
- Suspension Single/250 mm/14"
- Explosive weight, 42 kg
- Number of balls 15 000/6 900
- Ball diameter, mm ø8,75/ø11,9
- Bomb weight, 123 kg
- Fuze AVU-ETM; AVU-ET; AVU; AMV-AE2; 2'-12UN-2B; 3,5-12UN-2B
