= Pindad APS-2 =

Armoured personnel carrier

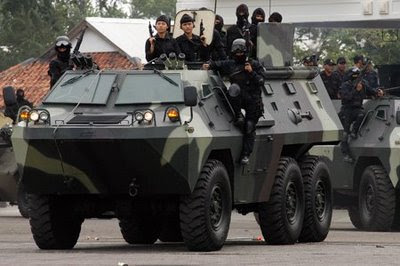
- Panser APS-2 in a parade
- Type: APC
- Place of origin: Indonesia

Service history
- Used by: Indonesian army

Production history
- Designer: Pindad
- Manufacturer: Pindad
- Unit cost: 600 million rupiah (2006), US$83,900 (2022)
- Produced: 2006
- No. built: Unknown

Specifications
- Mass: 12 ton (maximum)
- Crew: 15 men
- Armor: Monocoque body armor, 8–10 mm
- Main armament: 12,7 mm heavy machine gun or 40 mm grenade launcher
- Engine: Renault MIDR 062045 diesel turbo-charged 6 cylinder inline
- Maximum speed: 90 km/hour

The Pindad APS-2 or APS-2 (Indonesian: Angkut Personel Sedang-2, lit. 'Medium Personnel Carrier'), also known as APS-1V1 is an armored vehicle made by Pindad. It is a further development of the APR-1V 4×4 wheel drive run by BPPT and Pindad.

The refinement resulted in the APS-1 with 6×4 and APS-2 6×6 wheel drive, with a chassis derived from Perkasa trucks.

== History ==
The APS vehicle prototype (also known as APS-1) was built using the Perkasa truck chassis made by the Wahana Perkasa Auto Jaya (PT Texmaco) factory, Subang, West Java. The APS-1 armored vehicle has a capacity of 13 soldiers in which the driver sits in a separate cabin right next to the engine housing. Furthermore, the APS-1 design was refined by Pindad and BPPT, resulting in the APS-1 V1 variant (also known as APS-2).

The first appearance of the APS-2 in public was during the 2006 PTI (Pameran Teknologi & Industri - Technology & Industry Exhibition) at Jakarta's Plaza Parkir Timur Senayan, on 19–22 September 2006.

On January 13, 2010, 33 APS-2 armored units were handed over by Pindad. The total number of armored vehicles that have been submitted to the Ministry of Defense is 93 out of 150 APS-2 6×6 armored units and 4 reconnaissance units ordered by the Ministry of Defense, while the remaining 61 units with contract value of Rp473 billion is planned to be completed in 2010. Of the 33 units submitted, 13 units will be used by TNI troops for peacekeeping missions in Lebanon.

However, there seems to be a naming error in this order, where the actual order is the APS 6×6 which is Anoa.

== Design ==
The position of the engine is shifted from the driver's side to the center. This allows the commander and the rider to sit next to each other which can also help increase situational awareness for the driver.

At first glance, the APS-2 design resembles the Anoa 6×6 armored car.

== See also ==
- VAB
