= FK BRNO Field Pistol =

7.5 FK Field Pistol
- Type: Semi-automatic pistol
- Place of origin: Czech Republic

Production history
- Designer: FK BRNO
- Designed: 2011–2015
- Manufacturer: FK BRNO
- Unit cost: U$7,500
- Produced: 2015–present

Specifications
- Mass: 1,300 g (46 oz)
- Length: 240 mm (9.4 in)
- Barrel length: 152 mm (6.0 in)
- Width: 25.5 mm (1.00 in)
- Height: 136 mm (5.4 in) without sights 143 mm (5.6 in) with butterfly sight
- Cartridge: 7.5 FK
- Action: Short recoil operated
- Muzzle velocity: 610 m/s at muzzle 465 m/s at 100m
- Effective firing range: 100 m
- Feed system: 16+1-round detachable box magazine

The 7.5 FK Brno Field Pistol is a semi-automatic pistol developed by the Czech company FK Brno with support from Fratelli Tanfoglio S.N.C. It is a modified CZ 75 design.

== History ==
According to the manufacturer, development started in 2011. Main development objectives included:

- Muzzle velocities high enough to consistently hit a 100×100 mm (15.5-sq.in.or 3.94 inches square) target at 100 meters.
- Barrel length of 6 inches (152 mm) to achieve the required muzzle velocities.
- Felt recoil impulse should not exceed that of a hot .45 ACP +P load shot from an all-steel gun.
- Bullet's terminal performance at 100 m must be enough to effectively kill a 330-lb. living target.
- Target's permanent wound cavity should measure a minimum of 35 mm in diameter (1.38 in) and 300 mm in length (11.8 in).

Due to these specifications, FK BRNO had to design the 7.5 FK round from scratch. FK Brno first showcased the Field Pistol at the IWA 2015 expo.

== Design details ==
The 7.5 FK Field Pistol is a single action, tilting barrel semi-automatic pistol with a proprietary recoil attenuation system. It features a unique "butterfly" rear sight, designed to give the shooter a better view of the target and to naturally align with the front sight. The sight is adjustable for windage.

The 7.5 FK Field Pistol is significantly larger and heavier than other all-steel military pistols and about twice as heavy as current standard issue military pistols.

The proprietary cartridge is claimed to have an effective range—in terms of accuracy and terminal ballistics—of at least 100 meters (109 yards) for targets of up to 150 kg (330 lbs) while maintaining relatively low recoil and good controllability. To corroborate this claim, the manufacturer shot fenced domesticated hogs.

The cartridge produces 842 ft⋅lbf of muzzle energy (1142 J), roughly on par with the 10mm Auto and .357 Magnum.

== FK PSD Multi-Cal ==
7.5 FK PSD Multi-Cal

Production history
- Designed: 2015–2020
- Unit cost: US$1,650
- Produced: 2020–present

Specifications
- Mass: 38.8 oz (1,100 g)
- Length: 9.05 in (230 mm)
- Barrel length: 5.3 in (130 mm)
- Width: 1.2 in (30 mm)
- Height: 5.3 in (130 mm)
- Muzzle velocity: 1,922 feet per second (586 m/s) at muzzle
- Feed system: 16+1-round detachable box magazine (7.5 FK; 10 rounds for 10mm & .40, and 17 rounds for 9x19mm)

The FK PSD is the FK BRNO design adapted to have a polymer frame. Available at a much lower price-point, the PSD is lighter and roughly equal to the FK BRNO in performance. A multi-caliber design, it also shoots the cheaper 9x19mm, 10 mm Auto and .40 S&W ammunition types with a barrel replacement.

=== Variants ===
- PSD-C: Compact variant with the size of a Glock 19, with the height of 5.75 in (146 mm), overall length of 8.1 in (210 mm) and a 4.25 in (108 mm) barrel, weighing 38.8 oz (1,100 g).
- PSD-SL: Lightweight variant achieved by cutouts in the slide.

== See also ==
- Pindad PS-01—Handgun with 100 meters of effective range chambered in the 5.56×21mm bottleneck cartridge
