= Anoa (armoured personnel carrier) =

Pindad APS-3 "Anoa" 6x6
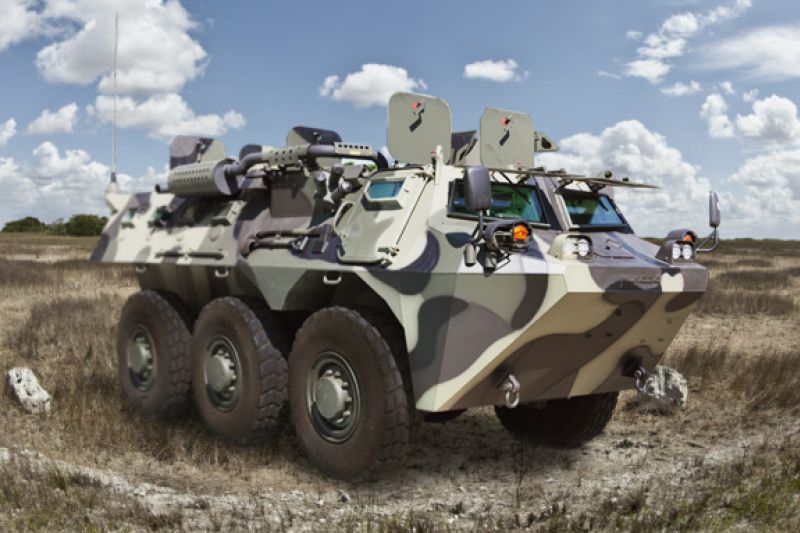
- First production model of the Anoa APC
- Type: Armoured personnel carrier
- Place of origin: Indonesia

Service history
- In service: 2009–present (Indonesian service)
- Used by: Indonesia
- Wars: Papua Conflict

Production history
- Designer: Pindad
- Designed: 2006
- Manufacturer: Pindad
- Produced: 2008–present
- No. built: 400+
- Variants: See Variants

Specifications
- Mass: 12.5 tonnes, 14.5 tons (combat)
- Length: 6 m
- Width: 2.5 m
- Height: 2.17 m hull top
- Crew: 3 + 10 passengers
- Armor: Monocoque steel armor, STANAG 4569 level 1; Optional upgrade to level 3 protection
- Main armament: 12.7 mm HMG/ 7.62 mm GPMG/ 40 mm AGL
- Secondary armament: 2×3 66 mm smoke grenade projectors
- Engine: Renault MIDR 062045 inline 6 cylinder turbo-charged diesel, Behr cooling pack 320 hp at 2500 rpm
- Power/weight: 22,85 hp/ton
- Transmission: Automatic, ZF S6HP502, 6 forward, 1 reverse
- Suspension: Independent suspension, torsion bar
- Ground clearance: 40 cm
- Fuel capacity: 200 litres
- Operational range: 600 km
- Maximum speed: ± 80 km/h (safety speed recommendation)

The Anoa is a 6×6 armoured personnel carrier developed by PT Pindad of Indonesia. The vehicle is named after the anoa, a type of buffalo indigenous to Indonesia. The prototype was first unveiled at the 61st anniversary of Indonesian National Armed Forces (TNI) on October 5, 2006, in TNI HQ at Cilangkap, east of the capital Jakarta.

The design of the Anoa resembles the Véhicule de l'Avant Blindé, which is also in service with Indonesia.

== History ==
The Anoa had been officially unveiled to the public under the designation APS-3 (Indonesian: Angkut Personel Sedang, English: Medium Personnel Carrier) at the Indo Defence & Aerospace 2008 exhibition from November 19 to November 22, 2008 after being shown in a TNI parade on October 5, 2008. By August 30, 2008, 10 APS-3s had been produced with the plan of producing 150 vehicles for the Indonesian Army in time for their first deployment in 2009.

Twenty of the vehicles were handed over to the Indonesian government through the Indonesian Defense Ministry, part of a deal from the initial 150 vehicles to 40 due to the economic crisis. 40 Pansers were delivered as part of PT Pindad's commitment to the total delivery of 154 vehicles. 33 Pansers were eventually submitted to the Ministry of Defense on January 13, 2010. Pindad had received loans from state-owned Bank Mandiri, Bank BNI and Bank BRI as part of payments for the manufacture of the Anoa.

The Anoas were officially placed into Indonesian military service in July 2009. They were publicly seen in service with the Mechanical TNI Battalion Task Force Garuda Contingent in Lebanon.

The Anoa made its first appearance overseas when it was publicly displayed in BRIDEX 2011 in Brunei. It was also displayed at DSA 2012 in Malaysia where a planned Malaysian-only marketed Anoa called the Rimau was unveiled to the public.

On November 5, 2019, it was announced that the Anoa would be promoted to DND officials for a possible purchase.

== Development ==
The development history of the Anoa started in 2003 as a result of increased military intervention in the Aceh province. During the military operations, the Indonesian Army put forward urgent requirements for an armoured personnel carrier for troop transport.

Pindad responded to this requirement in 2004, with the APR-1V (Angkut Personel Ringan) a light 4×4 armoured vehicle based on a commercial Isuzu truck chassis, 14 vehicles were built by Pindad and were sent to Aceh for evaluation and combat trials. However, the follow-on orders for another 26 vehicles were cancelled following the 2004 tsunami.

Pindad then continued the APC development program with assistance from the Agency For Assessment and Application of Technology or BPPT in 2004. The resulted prototype was the APS-1 (Angkut Personel Sedang), a 6×4 design that was again based on a commercial Perkasa truck platform by PT Texmaco.

Although it was not selected for production, the experience gained in developing the APS-1 convinced the Indonesian Army to give Pindad the go-ahead to develop the next generation of APS vehicles, the APS-2 at a production cost of IDR 600 million per unit. The APS-2 however, also failed to continue being mass-produced.

Together with BPPT in 2006, Pindad started new development of APS-3 from the development data of APS-2 which resulted in a production of the initial 4x4 prototype and followed by a more refined 6x6 prototype. The 6x6 prototype first undergoing testing and trials on the beginning of 2007 and then officially unveiled to the public during Indo Defence & Aerospace 2008 exhibition on November 19, 2008.

=== Design ===
The APS-3 differed from its predecessors which had been based on commercial truck platforms. Instead, the "Anoa" used a monocoque hull design consisting of armoured steel (RHA). The steel was made by PT Krakatau Steel to STANAG 4569 Level 3 standard to withstand 5.56 and 7.62 mm bullets. A new torsion bar suspension system was also developed for the Panser. The engine was imported from France with a Renault MIDR 062045 six-cylinder turbo-charged diesel engine fitted with ZF S6HP502 automatic transmission from Germany. The transmission consists of six forward gears and one reverse. The wheels are equipped with run-flat insert type super single 14.00 – R20 tires from Continental HSO-lineup and hydro-pneumatic controlled disc brake system on all wheels while the drive train of the vehicle comes in 6×6 configuration.

The crew enters the front compartment through two side doors. The driver sits on the right side of the vehicle while the vehicle commander sits on the left. The gunner sits behind commander inside the open turret beside the engine. The engine located in the middle (behind the driver), while the remaining space on the left of the engine (behind the commander) are fitted with an open turret for machine gun or automatic grenade launcher. Two additional hatches at the roof of the front compartment provide emergency exits for driver and commander. Two-banks (three each) of smoke grenade projectors were placed slightly behind the front side doors on each side.

The window and vision blocks are bullet-proof with the front windows also further protected by armoured shutters, which can be shut entirely, leaving a small observation slit for vision. A total of twelve vision blocks were placed on the Anoas with one on each of the front side door, four on the each side of troop compartment, and two on the hydraulic ramp door. A hydraulic ramp door at the rear provide access to troop compartment, there are also a single built-in door that could be opened manually in case of hydraulic system failures. The crew and mounted infantry both get direct access to the vehicle air-conditioning system. Two inward-facing benches, provide seating for five troops each (ten-troops total). Communications equipment include VHF/FM radios, crew intercom system, and GPS transceiver.

Emergency exit doors are present on either sides of the Anoas troop compartment as well as three roof hatches with one rear-facing light machine gun mounting can be seen on the right hatch, to be equipped and operated by the mounted infantries machine gunner. There are also tear-shaped firing port on the Anoas; with four port on each side of the troop compartment, two port on rear hydraulic ramp door, and one port on each of the front side doors, all of them located just below the vision blocks with total numbers of twelve firing ports fitted around the vehicle. A video camera was also placed at the rear of the vehicle to help driver while reversing the vehicle.

Several Anoas were equipped with locally produced Battlefield Management System (BMS) known as BMS CY-16H, developed and made by PT Hariff Daya Tunggal Engineering (DTE) together with Army Communication Directorate (Dithubad) since 2012.

On June 1, 2018, Pindad announced that it had entered into a partnership with Bhukhanvala Industries to research and develop a ceramic-based protection system for the Anoas.

In April 2019, Pindad announced that the Anoa 3 or Anoa Desert will be developed and sold to countries with desert terrain.

=== Anoa 2 ===
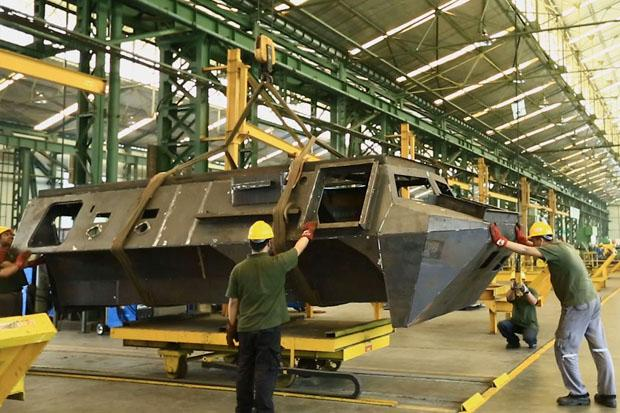
Pindad Anoa 2 hull construction (note the emergency exit door at the rear)

The Anoa 2 was officially revealed to the public in Indo Defence & Aerospace 2010. It was seen equipped with small waterjet propellers to swim in shallow water (replaced with additional storage bin for the mass-produced version). It is also equipped with an optional RCWS machine gun.

Some differences from the first generation of the Anoa include rounded roof hatches and re-positioning of the smoke grenade projectors from the sides of the vehicle to directly in front of the driver and commander hatches, modification to the armoured shutters which in previous version of Anoas required the crew to open and close them from the outside manually and only fitted to the front window now can be safely closed from inside and it also now present on each individual vision blocks, improved crew intercom systems, redesign of vehicles exhaust system from previously rounded muffler with long exhaust pipes now into rectangular muffler with short exhaust pipes mounted on the side, and reduction of vision blocks and firing ports in troop compartment from four on each side to three. Modification on the troop compartment also features individual roof/wall-suspended blast mitigation seat for ten troops and manual override for rear hydraulic ramp. Some vehicle also fitted with camera featuring night-vision capabilities at the front of the vehicle.

=== Anoa 3 ===
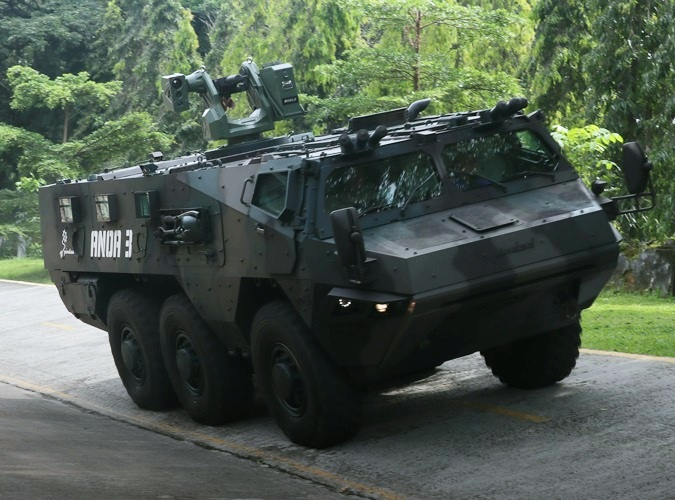
Anoa 3 demonstration, 27 January 2023

Revealed in Indo Defence 2022. A variant of the Arquus VAB Mk.3 with several adaptations conducted by Pindad known as the Anoa 3. It has STANAG Level 4 protection level.

=== Badak FSV ===
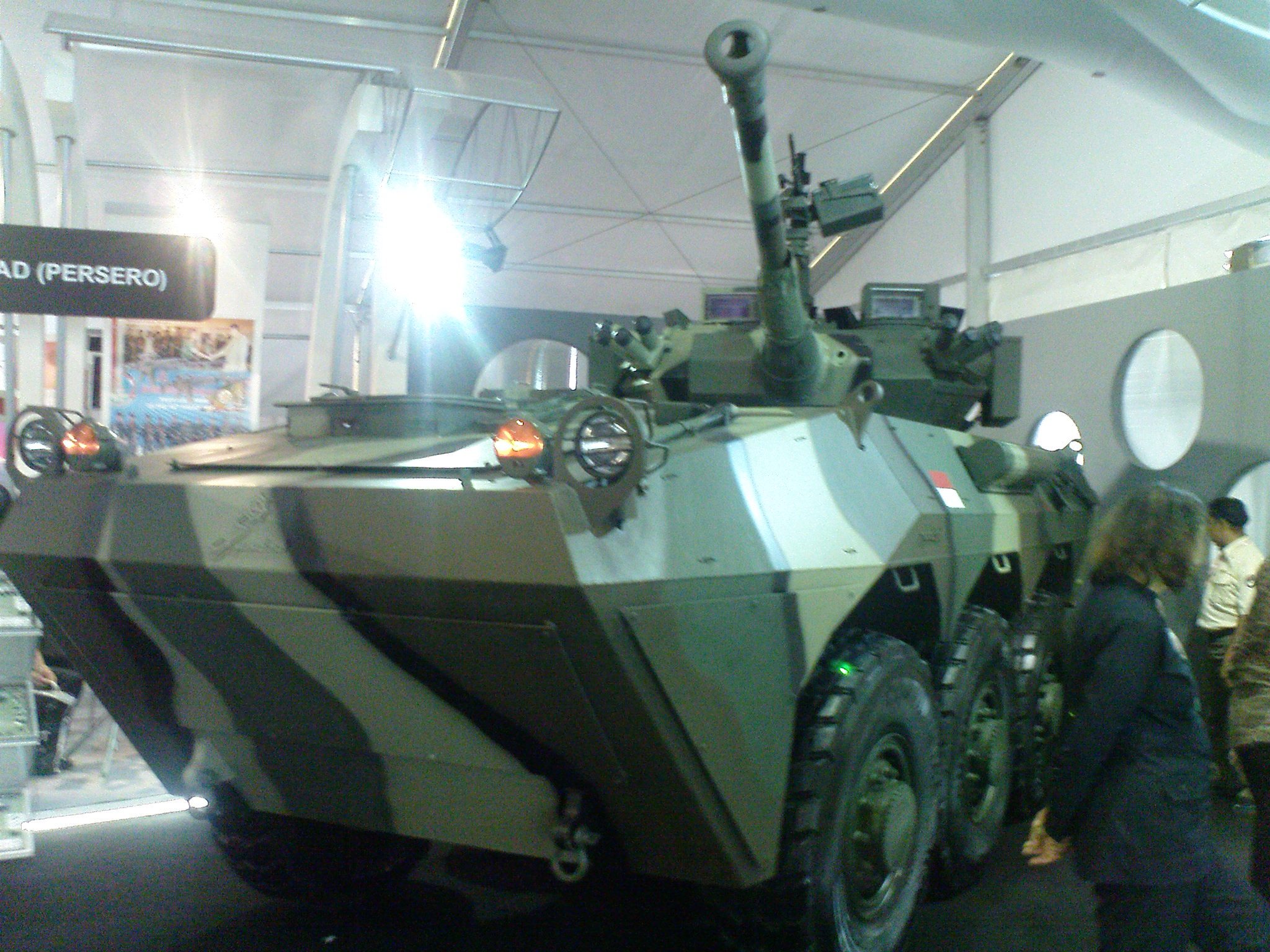
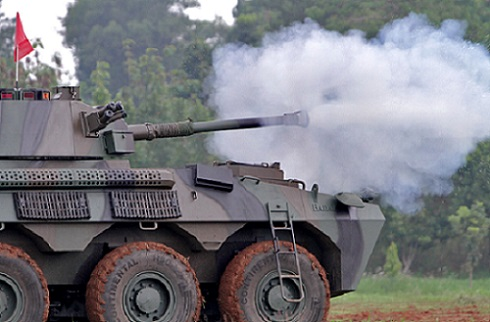
Left to right:
- A Pindad Anoa in a FSV configuration on display at the Indo Defence 2008
- Badak FSV during live-fire test, 2016

A prototype of Anoa fire-support version (FSV) using an Alvis AC 90 turret with the Cockerill 90 mm MkIII M-A1 gun was first unveiled at Indo Defence & Aerospace 2008, it was announced that the APS-3 fire-support version would be deployed into the Indonesian Army services by 2010.

The final, definitive version of the fire support variant was then unveiled at Indo Defence & Aerospace 2014 known as the Badak. The Badak featured a new design with all-welded monocoque steel hull with STANAG 4569 Level 3 protection, a new 340 hp power pack located at the front left and the driver now seated on the right side (beside the engine), leaving the remainder of the hull clear for the installation of the turret. The suspension also utilises double wishbone independent suspension (as opposed to torsion bar on the Anoa) for better stability while firing the 90 mm canon. The CMI Defence CSE 90LP two-person turret has a baseline protection of up to STANAG 4569 Level 1 (upgradable to Level 4) and is armed with a 90 mm low-pressure rifled gun. In addition, there is a 7.62mm co-axial machine gun, with another 7.62mm machine gun mounted on the left side of the turret roof for use in the limited air and self-defense roles, and also two-banks (four each) of 76 mm smoke grenade projectors on either side of the turret.

PT Pindad signed a contract with Ireland's Timoney Technologies during IDEX 2017 at Abu Dhabi, UAE for a customised Timoney modular drive-line, transfer case, and steering system to upgrade the Badak 6×6 fire support vehicle drive train.

=== Armament ===
The baseline vehicle is fitted with a small manually operated open turret on the left of the vehicle and armed with a 12.7 mm heavy machine gun, 7.62 mm general purpose machine gun, or a 40 mm automatic grenade launcher and also 2×3 66 mm smoke grenade projectors. There is one rear-facing 5.56 mm light machine gun mounting in front of right roof hatch in troop compartments for mounted infantry use.

In Indo Defence & Aerospace 2010, the Anoa 2 was shown to the public with a RCWS installed.

== Variants ==
The following variants are produced by Pindad:

- APC
- Up-armoured variants (fitted with add-on ceramic/composite armour)
- Ambulance
- Command
- Logistics (modular design for fuel/ammunition carrier)
- VIP variant (used by Paspampres)
- Armoured Recovery
- Reconnaissance/Surveillance
- 81mm Mortar Carrier
- Anoa 2
- Rimau (proposed Anoa 2 variant for Malaysia with Mercedes-Benz engine)
- Badak FSV
- APS-3 4x4 (prototype)
- Anoa FSV (prototype)
- Panser 20mm (fitted with Denel LCT20 turret) (prototype)
- Anoa 2 Amphibious (fitted with trim-vane, flotation kit, bilge-pump and large propeller) (prototype)

== Operators ==
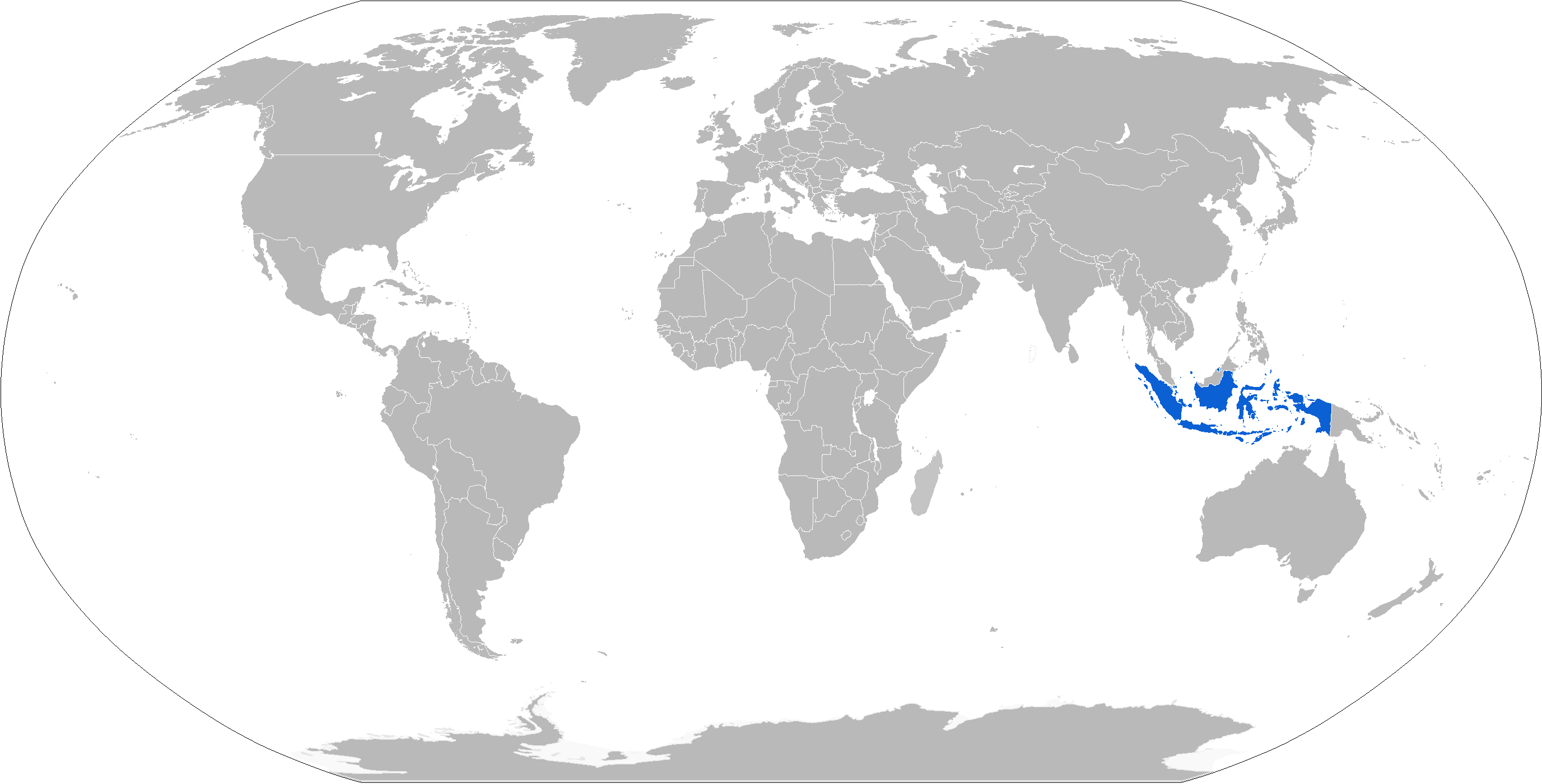
Map of Anoa operators Operator

=== Current operators ===
- Indonesia: 400+

=== Potential operators ===
- Bangladesh: In 2007, a visit by a Bangladeshi trade delegation to the Pindad office expressed interest in possible acquisition of the Panser. On March 30, 2021, it's reported that Pindad will export six Anoas.
- Brunei: In 2018, Brunei addressed intentions to purchase 45 Anoas alongside SS2s after holding informal talks back in 2015. The purchase was confirmed by the main director of Pindad Abraham Mose. No signed deal has materialised.
- Ghana: Ghana expressed interest in buying Anoa.
- Iraq: Iraq has expressed interest in buying the Anoa, taking the geography into account, during several meetings between Iraqi and Indonesian officials.
- Pakistan:
- Saudi Arabia: Indonesian Minister of Defense, Ryamizard Ryacudu said that Saudi Arabia was interested in buying Anoa combat vehicles.
- Timor Leste: Announced interest to purchase the Anoa.

=== Failed contracts ===
- Philippines: It was reported on November 5, 2019 that Prabowo was showing Filipino DND officials the Anoa for a possible purchase. The Philippine Army acquired the VBTP-MR Guarani.
- Malaysia: Malaysia reported to have shown interest to procure 32 Anoa "Rimau" variant. There is no signed deal available.
- Nepal: Nepal was reported to have shown interest for 28 6x6 versions of the Panser for its UN peacekeeping missions. There is no signed deal available.
- Oman: Unconfirmed reports of 200 units to be ordered. There is no signed deal available.

== See also ==
- VAB – (France)
- WZ-551 – (China)
- Patria Pasi – (Finland)
- TPz Fuchs – (West Germany)
