= Pindad PM3 =

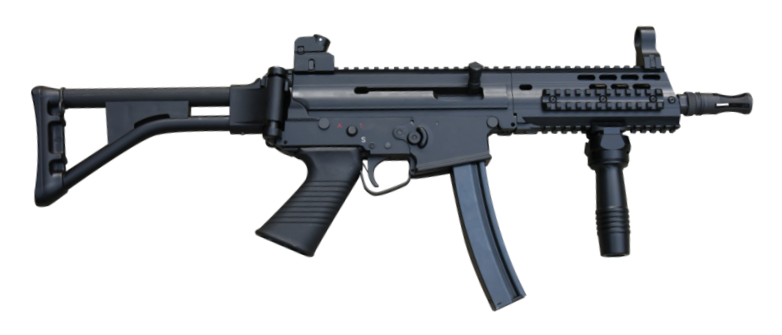
- Type: Submachine gun Semi-automatic Carbine (PM3A1, PM3 PCC Sport)
- Place of origin: Indonesia

Service history
- In service: 2019–present
- Used by: See Users

Production history
- Designer: Pindad
- Manufacturer: Pindad
- Produced: 2016–present
- Variants: See Variants

Specifications
- Mass: 3.15 kg (6.9 lb) without magazine
- Length: 494 mm (19.4 in), stock folded 720 mm (28 in) stock extended
- Barrel length: 210 mm (8.3 in)
- Cartridge: 9×19 mm Parabellum; 9×21 mm
- Action: Gas operated
- Rate of fire: 750–850 RPM
- Muzzle velocity: 380 m/s (1,247 ft/s)
- Effective firing range: 75 m (246 ft)
- Sights: Iron sights. Optical sights are possible with rail

The PM3 (Indonesian: Pistol Mitraliur 3) is a gas-operated submachine gun designed, developed and manufactured since 2016 by Pindad, an Indonesian state-owned enterprise specializing in military and commercial products. The PM3 submachine gun is primarily chambered in 9×19mm Parabellum, has variants of selective and semi-automatic fire only configurations.

== Development ==
The PM3 was first unveiled to the public on 9 June 2016, at the Hall of the Ministry of Defense of the Republic of Indonesia, in Jakarta. Its design and development was conducted by Pindad Directory of Development and Technology, including the implementation from input provided by users, to replace the previous generation PM2 submachine gun. Unlike the PM2, which uses blowback mechanism, PM3 uses a gas operated mechanism. PM3 also has rail integration system, which allows wider variety of attachments to be installed, such as sights, grips and tactical flashlight.

== Variants ==
=== Selective fire configurations ===
PM3 (Standard variant)

The standard variant of PM3 is a military version with three position firing selector (safe, single and automatic firing mode). Having barrel length 210 mm, 6 grooves rifling, standard weight 3.15 kg, weapon length 720 mm (extended buttstock), 494 mm (folded buttstock), rate of fire 750-850 rpm, and effective range 75 meters. This variant was first ordered by the Indonesian Marine Corps in 2021, and 95 PM3 delivered on 14 February 2023.

=== Semi-automatic only configurations ===
PM3A1

PM3A1 is a civil version with semi-automatic only firing mode, categorized as pistol caliber carbine. This variant was first ordered by the Indonesian Forest Rangers in 2018, and 100 PM3A1 delivered on 2019 as PM3 Cakrawana.

PM3-PCC Sport

PM3 PCC (Pistol Caliber Carbine) Sport is a civil version for sport, with semi-automatic only firing mode.

== Users ==
Country	Organization	Variant	Reference
Indonesia	Indonesian Forest Rangers	PM3A1	
Indonesia	Indonesian Marine Corps.	PM3	
