= Pindad APS-1 =

Armoured personnel carrier

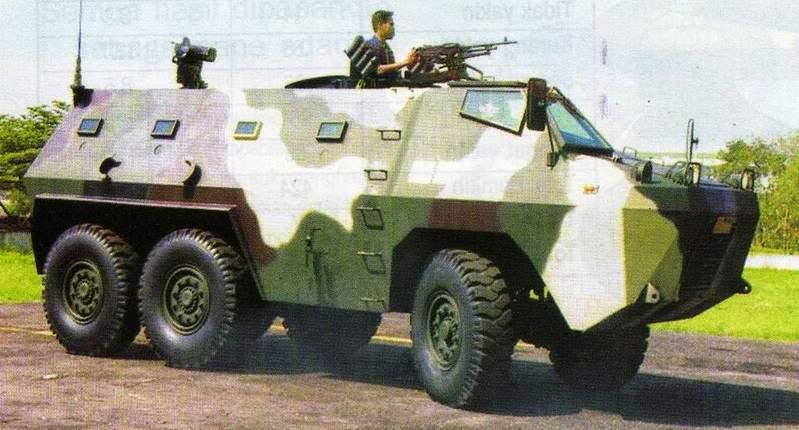
- APS-1 prototype. Note that the shape of the cabin is not symmetrical.
- Type: APC
- Place of origin: Indonesia

Production history
- Designer: BPPT, Pindad
- Manufacturer: Pindad
- No. built: Prototype only, not produced

Specifications
- Mass: 10–11 tons
- Crew: 13 men
- Armor: 8 mm steel armour
- Main armament: 12.7 mm machine gun 7.62 mm machinegun 40 mm Automatic grenade launcher
- Secondary armament: 6x 66 mm Smoke grenade launcher
- Engine: Renault MIDR 062045 turbo-charged diesel, 6 cylinder inline engine Steyr WD 612 6.600 cc 216 hp
- Transmission: Manual, 6 forward 1 reverse
- Ground clearance: 41 cm
- Maximum speed: 120 km/hour

The Pindad APS-1 or APS-1 (Indonesian: Angkut Personel Sedang-1, lit. 'Medium Personnel Carrier') is an armored vehicle made by the Indonesian defense manufacturer Pindad. The vehicle is based on the APR-1V with improved capabilities by using 6×4 wheel drive.

== Design ==
The difference with the APR-1V prototype is the replacement of the chassis model from Isuzu to the Perkasa truck chassis made by PT Texmaco. This nearly 11 tonne combat weight vehicle is powered by a diesel engine built into the Perkasa truck, namely the Steyr WD 612 with a cylinder capacity of 6,600 cc which produces 220 PS of power. The engine is paired with a manual transmission, 6 forward and 1 reverse.

The maximum speed on flat road reaches 120 km / hour. APS-1 has been equipped with power steering and air conditioning (AC). The APS-1 has a ground clearance of 41 cm making it agile enough to cross bumpy roads (off-road) and a turning radius of 8 m. This armored vehicle is capable of running on a 60 degree incline and a 30 degree slope.

== See also ==
- VAB
