= 7.5 FK =

Czech pistol cartridge

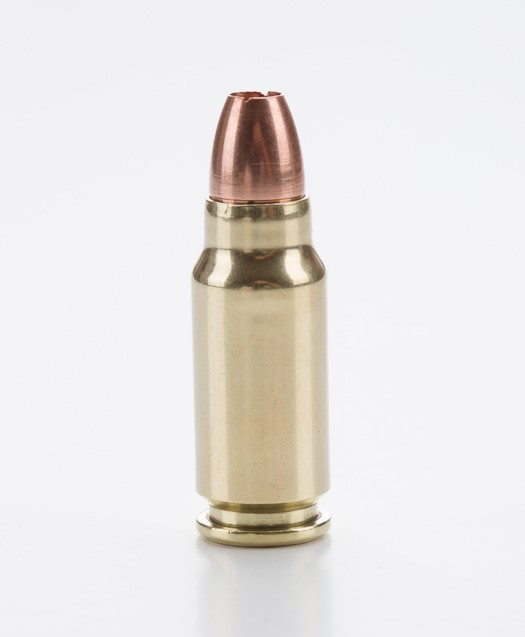
- Type: Pistol
- Place of origin: Czech Republic

Production history
- Designer: FK Brno Engineering s.r.o.
- Designed: 2009–2014
- Produced: 2014–present

Specifications
- Case type: Rimless, bottleneck
- Bullet diameter: 7.8 mm (0.307 in)
- Land diameter: 7.51 mm (0.296 in)
- Neck diameter: 8.5 mm (0.335 in)
- Shoulder diameter: 10.8 mm (0.425 in)
- Base diameter: 10.8 mm (0.425 in)
- Rim diameter: 10.80 mm (0.425 in)
- Rim thickness: 1.40 mm (0.055 in)
- Case length: 27 mm (1.063 in)
- Overall length: 35 mm (1.378 in)
- Case capacity: 1.50 cm^{3} (23.21 gr H_{2}O)
- Rifling twist: 270 mm (1 in 10,63 in)
- Primer type: Small pistol magnum
- Maximum pressure: 350.0 MPa (50,763 psi)

Ballistic performance
Bullet mass/type	Velocity	Energy
6.16 g (95 gr) FKB S95 JHP	2,000 ft/s (610 m/s)	850 ft⋅lbf (1,150 J)
6.54 g (101 gr) FKB CFN	1,950 ft/s (590 m/s)	850 ft⋅lbf (1,150 J)
- Test barrel length: 152mm (6")

The 7.5 FK (C.I.P.), also known as the 7.5 FK BRNO or the 7.5x27mm, is a bottlenecked rimless centerfire automatic pistol cartridge developed by the Czech firearms and ammunition manufacturer FK Brno Engineering s.r.o.

== History ==
The 7.5 BRNO was developed between 2009 and 2014, for the specific purpose of providing pistols the ability to engage combatant targets at a range of between 75–150 metres (82–164 yd) while retaining more kinetic energy at that range than a 9×19mm Parabellum cartridge can generate at the muzzle/point blank range.

Due to the length of the cartridge, relatively high energy, and the pressure that the cartridge generates, no current high-capacity automatic pistol existed that could accommodate the new caliber. FK BRNO developed a specialized platform to accommodate and use this caliber.

Initially, it was chambered in the all-steel FK BRNO Field Pistol (2015) which had a patented recoil attenuating system, but subsequently FK BRNO developed a polymer version of that design, designated as the FK PSD (2020).

== Cartridge dimensions ==
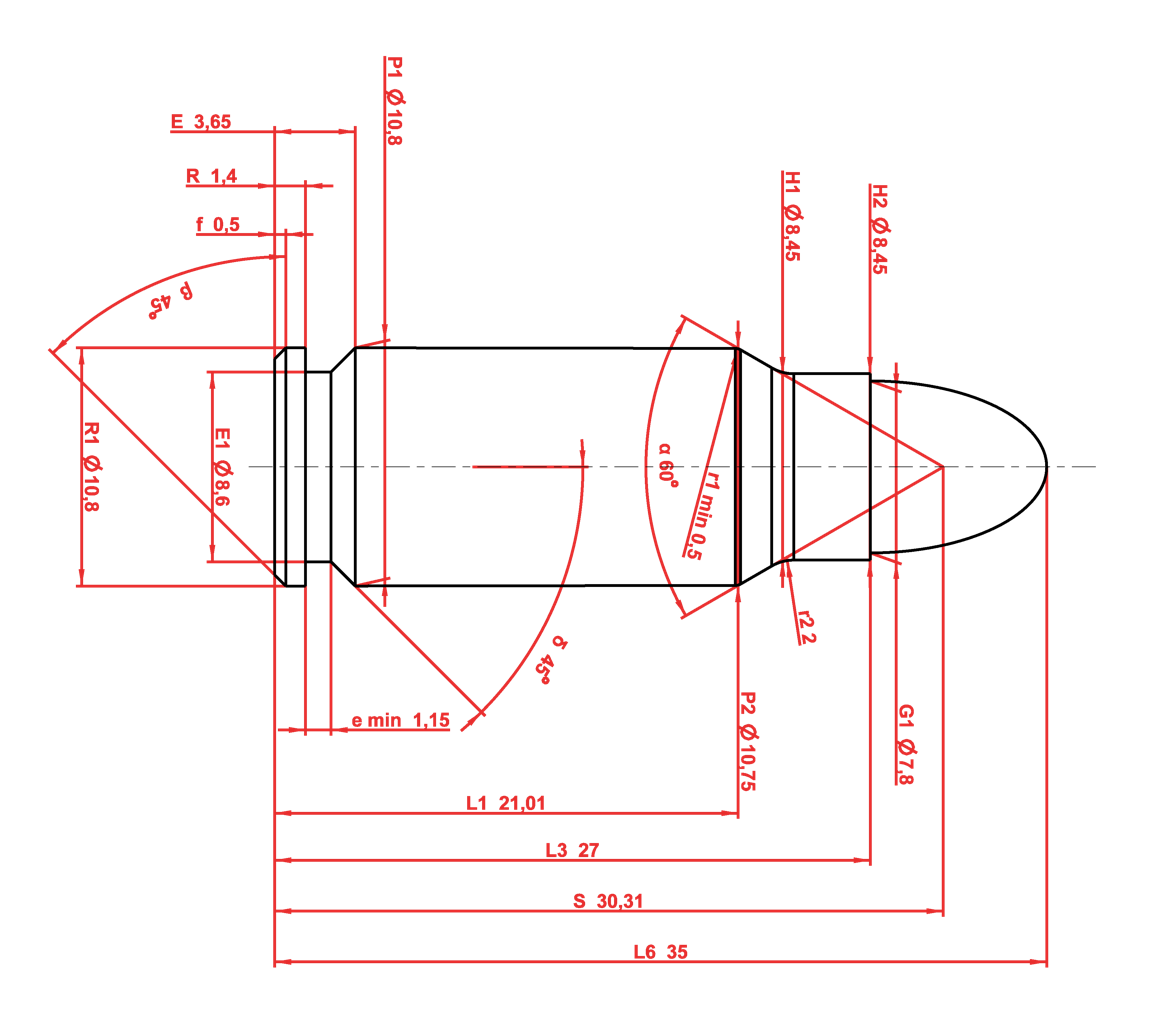
7.5 FK maximum C.I.P. cartridge dimensions

The 7.5 FK has 1.50 cm^{3} (23.21 grain of H_{2}O) cartridge case capacity. Americans would define the shoulder angle at alpha/2 = 30 degrees. The common rifling twist for this cartridge is 270mm (1 in 10.62" inch), 6 grooves, Ø lands = 7.5 mm, Ø grooves = 7.77mm, land width = 3.75 mm, and the primer type is small pistol.

According to C.I.P rulings, the 7.5 FK case can handle up to 350 MPa (50,763 psi) piezo pressure. In C.I.P regulated countries, every pistol cartridge combo has to be proofed at 130% of this maximum C.I.P pressure to certify for sale to consumers.

== Characteristics ==
The goal of the 7.5 FK project was to create a cartridge with a level of performance that could exceed that of the highly effective 125 gr (8.1 g) JHP .357 Magnum load, be at least as effective terminally as the 7.62x39mm Russian and 5.56×45mm NATO cartridges when fired from short (8–10 in (20–25 cm)) barrel AK and AR type platforms, and to provide a package small enough to fit a standard-size military automatic pistol. Another goal was to have a flat trajectory and be accurate enough to engage targets at 75–150 m (82–164 yd), which is the most common engagement distance in modern combat situations.

Measurements of standard 7.5 cartridges loaded with 95 gr (6.2 g) bullets showed a muzzle velocity of 2,000 ft/s (610 m/s) out of a 5.3 in (13.46 cm) barrel equal to 4 in (10.16 cm) of free bore and a muzzle energy of 845 foot-pounds force (1,146 J), which is almost 50% higher than the 357 magnum 125 grain JHP when using premium quality high pressure ammunition where the measured muzzle velocity is 1,450 ft/s (440 m/s) and muzzle energy of 584 foot-pounds force (792 J) when fired from a 4 in (10.16 cm) barrel.

More importantly, the 7.5 FK cartridge achieves this without compromising the sectional density of the projectile, which is critical for penetration and stopping power. The 95 gr (6.2 g) 7.5 FK cartridge has a sectional density of 0.150, while the 101 gr (6.5 g) 7.5 FK cartridge has a sectional density of 0.160. In comparison, the 357 magnum 125 cartridge has a sectional density of 0.140. The higher sectional density allows the 7.5 FK projectile to retain higher velocity and lower trajectory at longer ranges, while having significantly deeper penetration, especially since it has 40% more velocity. It is interesting to note that the measured velocity and energy of the 95 grain load 7.5 FK cartridge at the minimum design engagement distance of 75 m (82 yd) is 1,650 ft/s (500 m/s) and 577 foot-pounds force (782 J) respectively. Which is essentially almost the same as what the 125 grain JHP 357 magnum generates at point blank range from the same barrel length.

== Performance ==
The table below shows common performance parameters for several common automatic pistol calibers using kinetic energy as the main form of power comparison, using premium high-end ammunition using a 5 in (130 mm) barrel.

Caliber	Manufacturer	Load	Mass	Velocity fps @ 1m	Velocity fps @ 90m	Energy ft*lbs @ 1m	Energy ft*lbs @ 90m
9mm Luger	Cor-Bon	JHP+p	125 gr	1,250	1,016	434	286
.357 Sig	Cor-Bon	JHP	125 gr	1,425	1,119	564	348
.40 S&W	Fiocchi	JHP	165 gr	1,100	942	450	325
10mm Auto	Hornady	JHP/XTP	180 gr	1,275	1,052	650	443
5.7x28 FN	Speer	gold Dot	40 gr	1,790	1,322	285	155
7.5 FK	FK BRNO	F5	95 gr	2,000	1,610	845	548

The concept of using kinetic energy tables as a measuring method for incapacitating power has been used for almost a century but has been disputed for almost as long by various different authorities, scholars, and writers as it does not take into account the projectile construction and design which may affect terminal performance significantly. It also does not take into account penetration capability which is highly influenced by projectile material, design, and sectional density. Several theories have been published that claim better prediction of incapacitating power than kinetic energy such as Taylor KO index, Hatchers theory, Lethality index, Bekker knock out formula, and Hornady HITS among others. FK BRNO has published their own alternative method which they claim is more efficient and more accurate predictor of incapacitating power which they call Dynamic Shock Index (DSI). They have also published a video showing the 7.5 cartridge being used to hunt large boars where they claim that the terminal ballistics efficiency shown in the video is due to the high DSI of these loads.

== Available loads ==
F9: All copper monolithic wide meplat flat nose. This bullet is designed to create a wide and very deep permanent wound channel in addition to a very high dynamic shock effect. Accurate and effective for defence and medium game hunting up to 300 lb (140 kg) to 100 yd (91 m), and dangerous game up to 500 lb (230 kg) to 50 yd (46 m).

S95: Jacketed Hollow point made by Sierra bullets exclusively for FKB, it is designed to shatter and fragment on impact. This bullet makes huge, but shallower wound channels than the other versions. Accurate and effective for defence and medium game hunting up to 100 lb (45 kg) at 100 yd (91 m).

F5: All copper, monolithic nose discarding hollow point. The nose is designed to break off on impact, leaving a jagged 7 mm (0.28 in) meplat to create a large deep penetrating wound channel and a High Terminal Effect. Accurate and effective for defence and medium game hunting up to 200 lb (91 kg) to 100 yd (91 m).

F7: All copper, monolithic spoon tip. This bullet is designed to tumble after the initial impact and penetration, creating a very large eliptical and deep penetrating wound channel. Accurate and effective for tactical use up to 150 yd (140 m) and dangerous game hunting up to 500 lb (230 kg) to 50 yd (46 m).

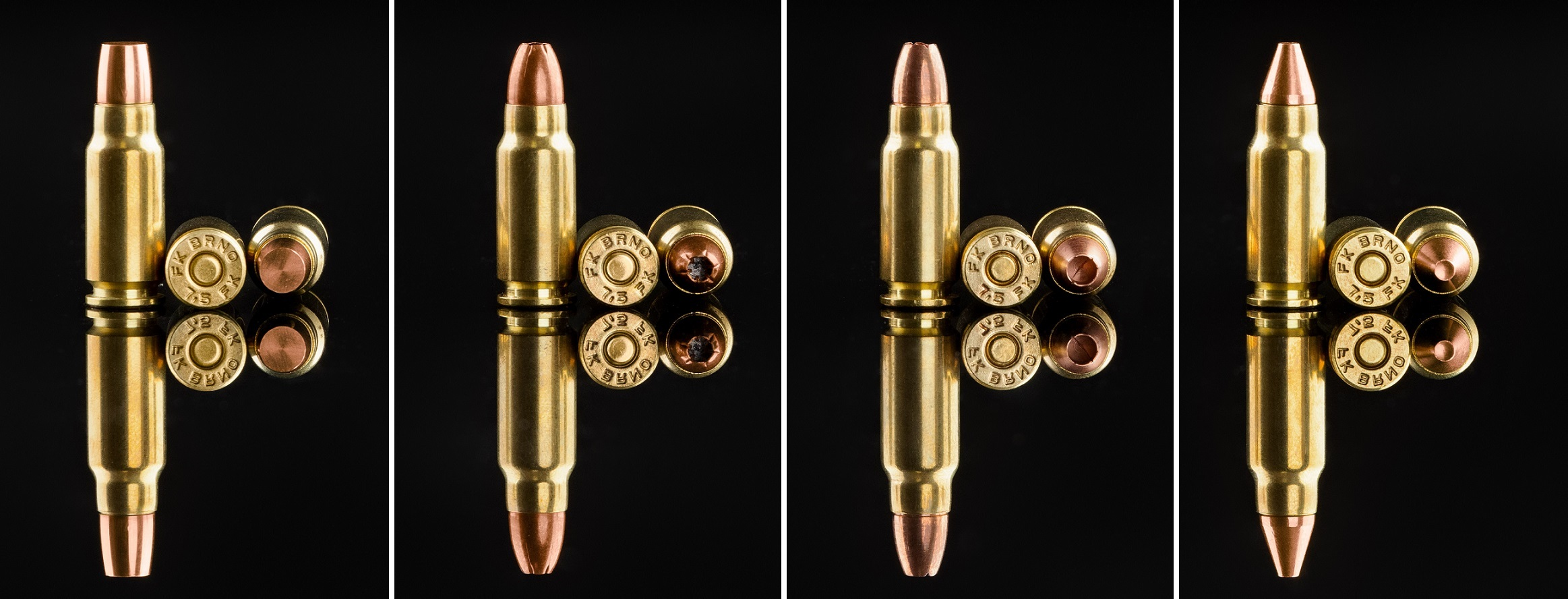
7.5 FK bullet types
