= Pindad Badak =

Badak
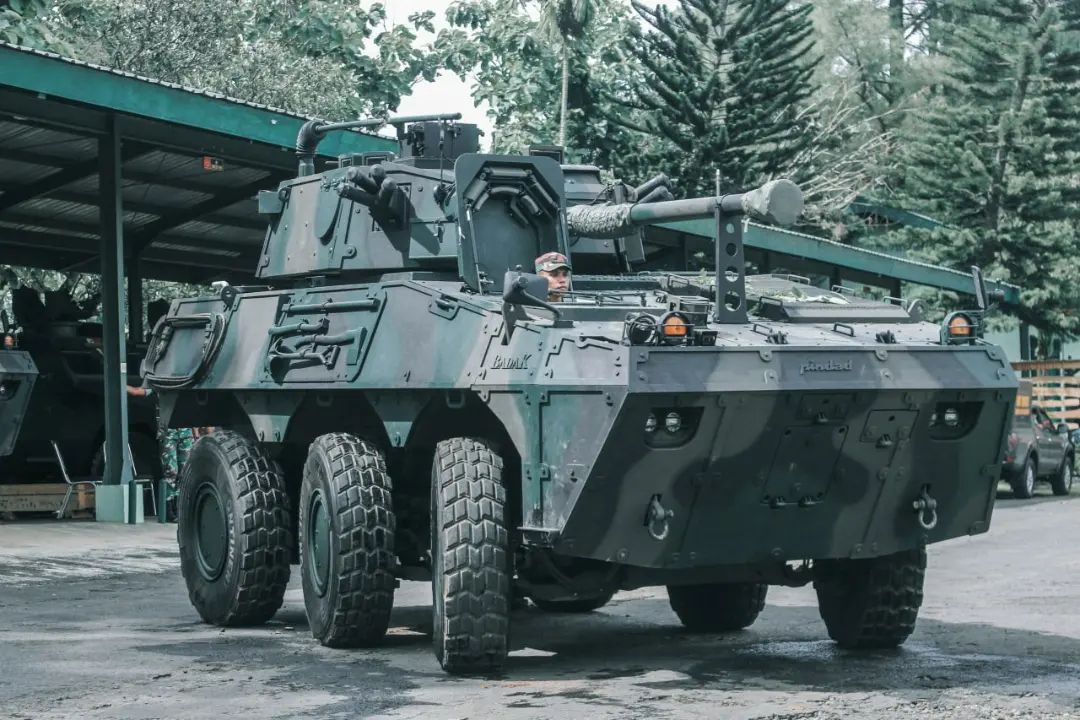
- Badak FSV
- Type: Fire support vehicle
- Place of origin: Indonesia

Service history
- In service: 2022–present
- Used by: Indonesia

Production history
- Designer: Pindad
- Designed: 2013
- Produced: 2014–present

Specifications
- Mass: 12.5 tons (empty), 14 tons (full)
- Length: 6 m (20 ft)
- Width: 2.5 m (8.2 ft)
- Height: 2.9 m (9.5 ft)
- Crew: 3
- Armor: STANAG 4569 level 3, can be up armoured to level 4
- Main armament: Cockerill 90 mm MkIII M-A1 gun mounted on Cockerill CSE 90LP turret
- Secondary armament: 7.62 mm machine gun
- Engine: Diesel inline 6, turbocharged and intercooled (340 HP)
- Suspension: Double wishbone suspension, 6x6 wheeled
- Operational range: 600 km (370 mi)
- Maximum speed: 80 km/h (50 mph)

The Pindad Badak is a 6×6 fire support vehicle designed and produced by PT Pindad. The name Badak means rhinoceros in Indonesian.

== Development ==
A prototype of the Anoa fire-support version (FSV) using an Alvis AC 90 turret with the Cockerill 90 mm MkIII M-A1 gun was first unveiled at Indo Defence & Aerospace 2008, it was announced that the APS-3 fire-support version would be deployed into the Indonesian Army services by 2010.

The final, definitive version of the fire support variant, known as the Badak, was then unveiled at Indo Defence & Aerospace 2014. The Badak featured a new design with all-welded monocoque steel hull with STANAG 4569 Level 3 protection, a new 340 hp power pack located at the front left and the driver now seated on the right side (beside the engine), leaving the remainder of the hull clear for the installation of the turret. The suspension also utilises double wishbone independent suspension (as opposed to torsion bar on the Anoa) for better stability while firing the 90 mm canon. The CMI Defence CSE 90LP two-person turret has a baseline protection of up to STANAG 4569 Level 1 (upgradable to Level 4) and is armed with a 90 mm low-pressure rifled gun. In addition, there is a 7.62 mm co-axial machine gun, with another 7.62 mm machine gun mounted on the left side of the turret roof for use in the limited air and self-defence roles, and also two-banks (four each) of 76 mm smoke grenade projectors on either side of the turret.

PT Pindad signed a contract with Ireland's Timoney Technologies during IDEX 2017 at Abu Dhabi, UAE for a customised Timoney modular drive-line, transfer case, and steering system to upgrade the Badak 6×6 fire support vehicle drive train.

A Pindad Badak with a mockup turret of the Oerlikon Skyranger was shown during Indo Defence 2022 Expo & Forum named as Badak 6x6 SPAAG.

== User ==
- Indonesia: Initially 50 vehicles would be built. As of 2018, the order was reduced from 50 to 14 vehicles. It is intended to replace the Alvis Saladin.

== See also ==
- VBC-90, French armoured vehicle modelled after VAB
- AMX-10 RC
- Panhard ERC-90
