= Pindad AM1 =

Pindad SS3-M1
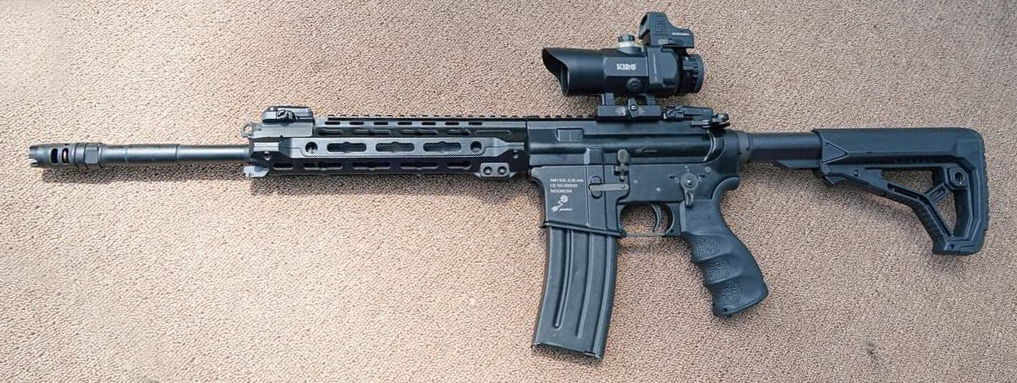
- Pindad SS3-M1 Assault Rifle
- Type: Assault rifle
- Place of origin: Indonesia

Service history
- Used by: See Users

Production history
- Designer: Pindad
- Designed: 2022 - Present
- Manufacturer: Pindad
- Produced: 2023 - Present
- Variants: Variants that may be developed in the future, according to the needs of the user.

Specifications
- Mass: 3.25 kg
- Length: 881 mm (34.7 in) stock extended, 797 mm (31.4 in) stock retracted
- Cartridge: 5.56×45mm NATO
- Caliber: 5.56mm
- Barrels: 14.5 in (370 mm); 10.5 in (270 mm)
- Action: Gas-Operated, short stroke piston, rotating bolt
- Feed system: 30-rounds STANAG magazine
- Sights: Iron sights, optical sights can be mounted on rail

The Pindad AM1 (Indonesian: Assault Military 1), or designated as Pindad SS3-M1 (Indonesian: Senapan Serbu 3 Modular 1, lit. 'Assault Rifle 3 Modular 1') for the Indonesian military, is an assault rifle produced by Pindad, which was first introduced in 2022.

== History ==
In 2023, Pindad published a product demonstration of the AM1 using a red dot sight with a range of 50 meters, which Pindad mentioned the demonstration was conducted on 6 January 2022.

On 3 July 2024, the President Director (CEO) of Pindad Abraham Mose stated that AM1 had passed the trial period by the Indonesian Army and 15,000 AM1s had been produced.

In September 2024, Pindad representatives commented at the International Indonesia-Africa Forum (IAF) that Congolese and Senegalese officials were interested in looking into the AM1.

On 2 October 2024, Pindad's CEO Abraham Mose stated that AM1 had received the certification, and highlighted the growing interest from foreign markets, particularly from the United States and several Southeast Asian nations. He also stated that 20,000 AM1s had been produced.

On February 26, 2025, the assault rifle is designated as the SS3-M1. Pindad announced that the rifle was produced following directives from the Minister of Defense, Sjafrie Sjamsoeddin.

== Design ==
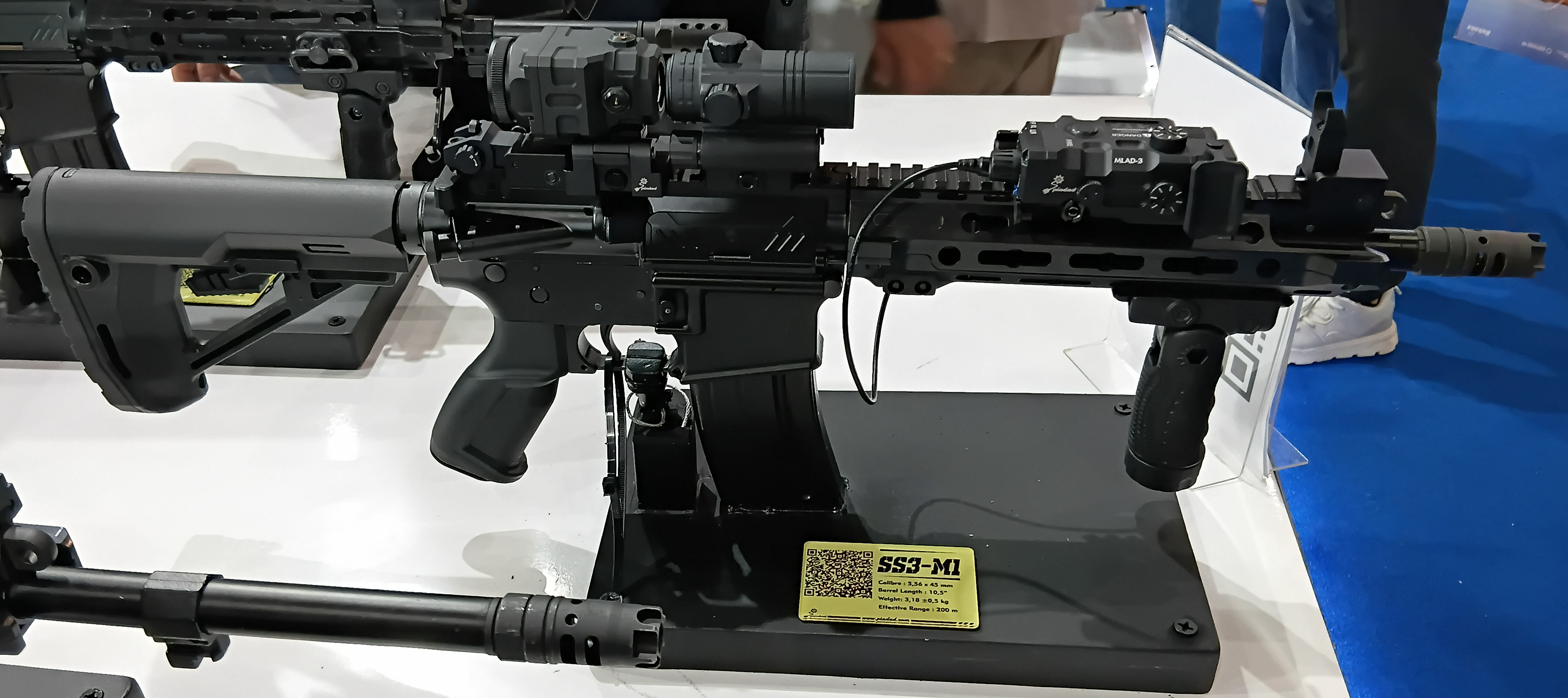
Pindad SS3-M1 assault rifle with 10.5 inch barrel, with mounted vertical handgrip, laser and sights.

The SS3-M1 is a 5.56×45mm NATO caliber assault rifle. It has 14.5-inch and 10.5 inch barrels with a retractable telescopic stock.

For 14.5-inch barrel has a total length of 881 mm with the stock fully extended, and 797 mm with the stock in the normal position. Weighs 3.25 kg without a magazine, making it relatively light and easy to carry and operate.

It is equipped with Picatinny and M-LOK rail systems, enabling various accessories such as optics, lights, and grips to be mounted according to different mission requirements.

Ergonomic considerations were paramount in the design process, with the SS3-M1 featuring improved grip textures and control layouts to enhance handling and reduce user fatigue.

=== Operation ===
The SS3-M1 is a third-generation and the latest iteration of assault rifle series produced by PT Pindad, based on the AR-15–style platform ergonomic architecture, but uses a short-stroke gas piston operating system (unlike the AR-15's piston-operated gas impingement system) with a user-adjustable gas system, while also incorporating feedback from users of the SS1 and SS2.

It was developed to provide a more advanced and adaptable weapon system for the Indonesian armed forces, incorporating several key features that enhance its performance, ergonomics, and modularity.

== Users ==
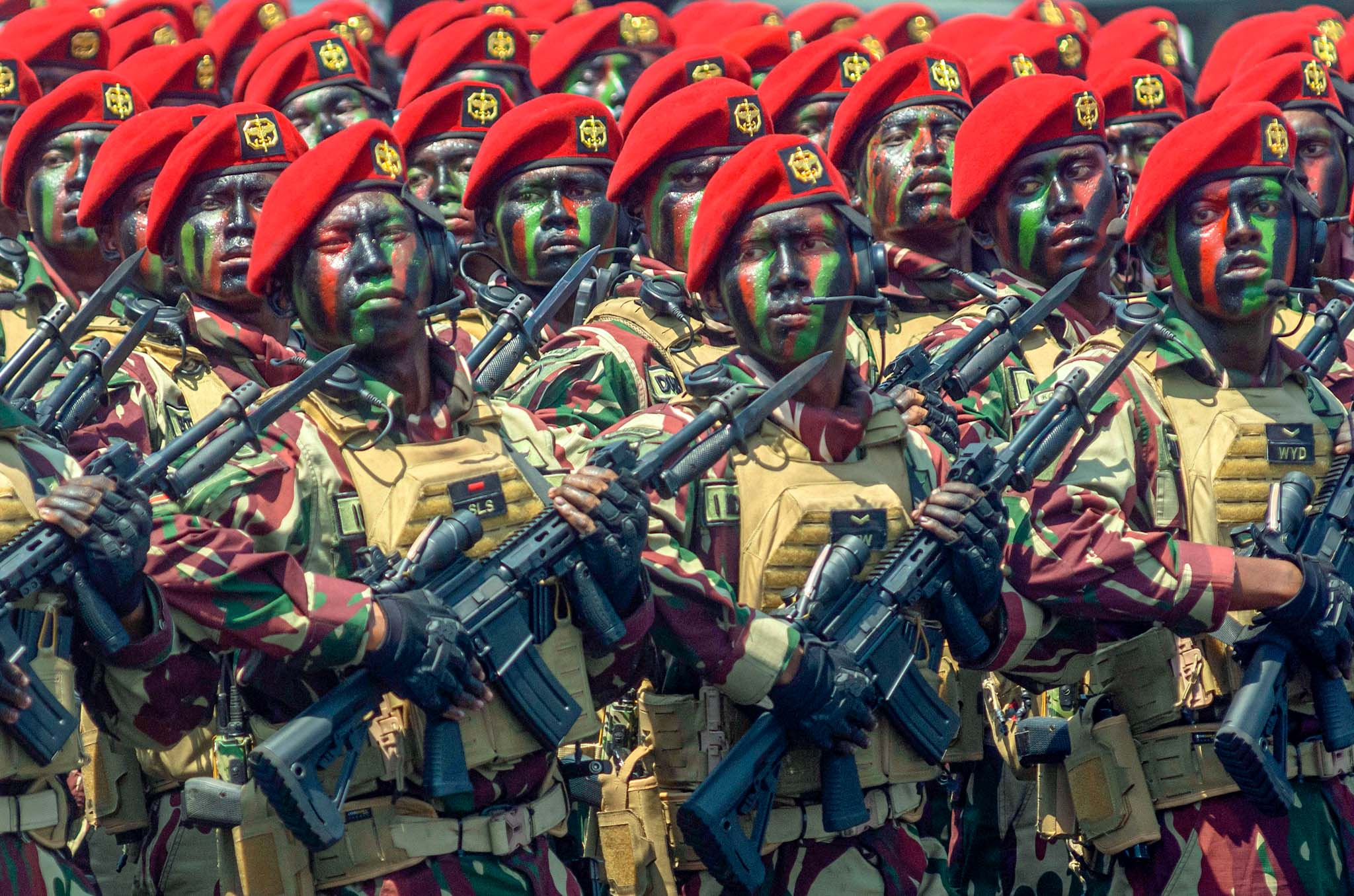
A number of Special Forces Command (Kopassus) soldiers equipped with Pindad SS3-M1 assault rifles, marched after the Operational Troops and Military Honors Ceremony on August 10, 2025.

- Indonesia: Indonesian Armed Forces
