= Pindad P3 =

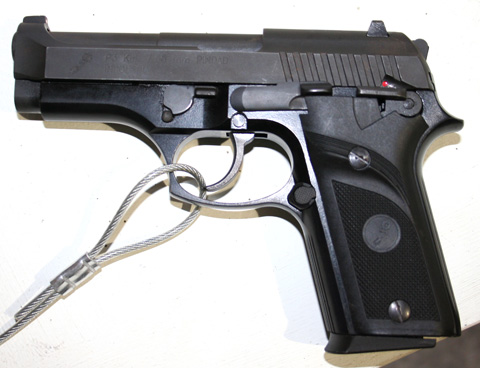
- Type: Semi-automatic pistol
- Place of origin: Indonesia

Production history
- Designer: Pindad
- Manufacturer: Pindad

Specifications
- Mass: 794 g (28.0 oz)
- Length: 177 mm (7.0 in)
- Barrel length: 102 mm (4.0 in)
- Cartridge: .32 ACP
- Effective firing range: 25 meters
- Feed system: 12-round detachable box magazine
- Sights: blade front, notch rear

The Pindad P3 is a double action/single action semi-automatic pistol made by PT Pindad as a compact and unobtrusive pistol for self-defense.

== Design ==
The Pindad P3 is chambered in .32 ACP and has a magazine capacity of 12. It resembles a compact version of the Taurus PT92 due to its Beretta-like design with a frame-mounted safety.

The sight on the P3 is a tritium three dot sight that was also used on the P1 and P2.
