= Pindad Mo-3 Mortar =

Pindad Mo-3 mortar
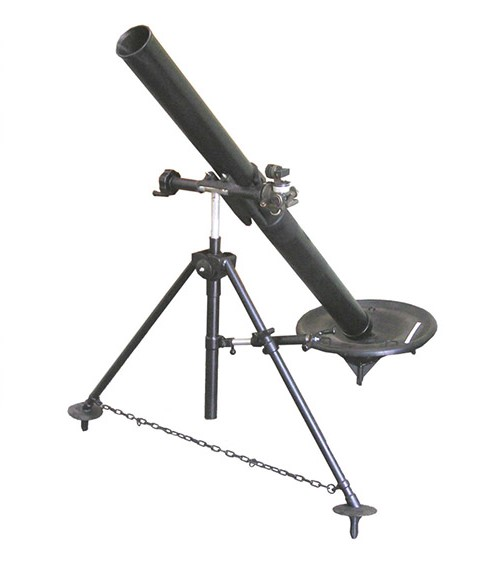
- Pindad Mo-3 Mortar
- Type: Mortar
- Place of origin: Indonesia

Service history
- In service: 2000–present
- Used by: Indonesian Army; Indonesian Marine Corps; Indonesian Air Force
- Wars: Counter-insurgency in Aceh; Counter-insurgency in Maluku; Papua conflict Operation Madago Raya; Operation Cartenz's Peace

Production history
- Manufacturer: Pindad

Specifications
- Mass: 41.3 kilograms (91 lb)
- Length: 50 in (127 cm)
- Barrel length: 1.27 metres (4 ft 2 in)
- Crew: 5
- Caliber: 81 millimetres (3.2 in)
- Elevation: 45°–85.2°
- Traverse: 5.6°
- Rate of fire: 8–16 rpm sustained 20–30 rpm in exceptional circumstances and for short periods
- Effective firing range: HE: 91–5,935 m (99–6,490.6 yd)
- Feed system: muzzle-loaded

The Pindad MO-3 81 mm medium weight mortar is an Indonesian-designed smooth bore, muzzle-loading, high-angle-of-fire weapon used for long-range indirect fire support to light infantry, air assault, and airborne units across the entire front of a battalion zone of influence. In the Indonesian Army and Indonesian Marine Corps, it is normally deployed in the mortar platoon of an infantry battalion.
