= Pindad =

Indonesian military and commercial company

PT Pindad (Persero)
- Type: Subsidiary
- Industry: Defense; Industrial; Construction; Automotive
- Founded: 1808 – As Constructie Winkel (CW)
- Founder: Herman Willem Daendels
- Headquarters: Bandung, West Java, Indonesia
- Key people: Sigit Puji Santosa (CEO); Akhmad Syakhroza (Commissioner)
- Products: See Known products
- Revenue: ▲ Rp 3.39 trillion (2019)
- Net income: ▲ Rp 101.07 billion (2019)
- Total assets: ▲ Rp 6.89 trillion (2019)
- Total equity: ▲Rp 1.463 trillion (2019)
- Number of employees: 2,588 (2019)
- Parent: Len Industri
- Subsidiaries: PT Pindad Enjiniring Indonesia (PT PEI) PT Pindad Medika Utama (PT PMU) PT Pindad International Logistics (PT PIL) PT Pindad Global Sources and Trading (PT PGST) PT Pindad MAN Diesel & Turbo PT Inti Pindad Mitra Sejati (PT IPMS)
- Website: pindad.com

PT Pindad (Persero) (formerly abbreviated from Perindustrian Angkatan Darat, lit. 'Indonesian Army Industries'), is an Indonesian state-owned enterprise specialising in military and commercial products. Pindad provides the armaments and munitions (alat utama sistem persenjataan, Alutsista) for the Indonesian National Armed Forces and other uniformed agencies mainly to support the defense and security capabilities of the Republic of Indonesia.

Aside from its defense industry, Pindad also produces industrial products for other fields such as transportation and commercial explosives. Pindad's activities include design, development, engineering and fabrication as well as maintenance.

== History ==
In 1808, Governor-General Daendels ordered the establishment of workshops for materiel, munitions, and weaponry maintenance named Constructiewinkel (CW) in Surabaya, which acted as a precursor to the defense industry in Indonesia. He also instructed the establishment of an artillery workshop known as Projektiel Fabriek (PF). The government further established naval materiel and explosives factory named Pyrotechnische Werkplaats (PW) in 1850. On 1 January 1851, PW was renamed Artillerie Constructie Winkel.

During the period 1923–1932, workshops in Surabaya were moved to Bandung and merged into a single entity named Artillerie Inrichtingen (AI). During Japanese occupation of the Dutch East Indies, ACW was renamed 第一構造 Dai Ichi Kozo (DIK). And afterward it was renamed Leger Productie Bedrijven (LPB).

On 29 April 1950, following the agreement on Dutch–Indonesian Round Table Conference, whereas Netherlands transferred sovereignty to United States of Indonesia, the Netherlands Ministry of Defense also transferred LPB to the Indonesian National Armed Forces and the Ministry of Defense. LPB was later renamed Pabrik Senjata dan Mesiu (PSM) and its management was entrusted to the Indonesian Army, making it a nationalized military industrial firm.

PSM was renamed Pabrik Alat Peralatan Angkatan Darat (Pabal AD) in 1958, and in 1962 as Perindustrian TNI Angkatan Darat (Pindad).

In 2020, Pindad was reported to have exported Indonesian-made ammunition to Myanmar.

=== COVID-19 ===
During the COVID-19 pandemic in Indonesia, PT. Pindad developed a ventilator prototype to be used as a breathing aid for COVID-19 patients. As the number of patients rose and demand for medical equipment in the country skyrocketed, Pindad produced and distributed inexpensive ventilators to hospitals across Indonesia.

=== Awards ===
Pindad has received awards for the creation of the Pindad SS1 and Pindad SS2 rifles that enabled the Indonesian Army to win at ASEAN Army Rifle Meet XVI contest in 2006.

== Facilities ==
The munitions division is located in Turen, Malang and has production facilities and laboratories on 166 hectares.

== Known products ==
=== Ammunition ===
- 12.7 mm Calibre Bullets
- 7.62 mm Calibre Bullets
- 5.56 mm Calibre Bullets
- 7.65 x 17 mm Calibre Bullets
- 7.62 x 45 mm Calibre Bullets
- 9 mm Calibre Bullets
- .45 ACP Calibre Bullets
- .40 S&W Calibre Bullets
- .38 mm Calibre Bullets
- .32 mm Calibre Bullets
- 44 mm Calibre Mortars
- 60 mm Calibre Mortars
- 81 mm Calibre Mortars

=== Weapons ===
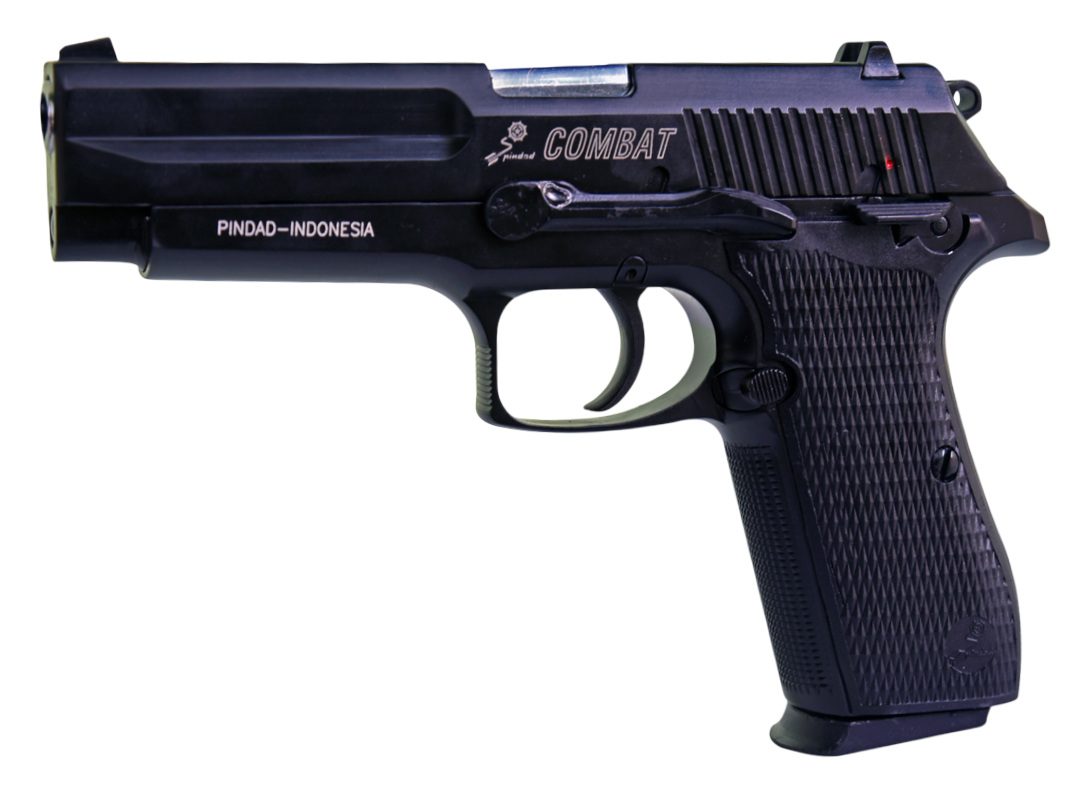
Pindad G2 Combat handgun.

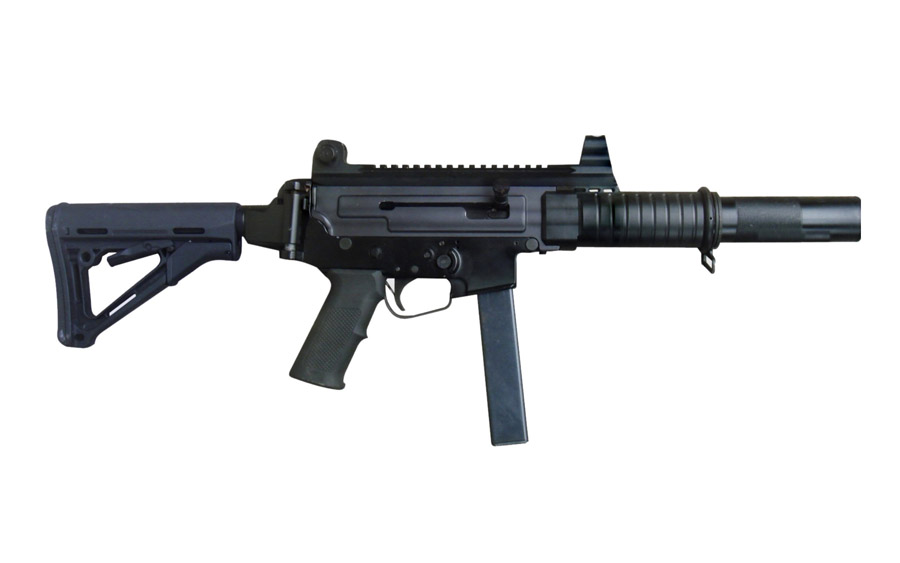
Pindad PM2-V2

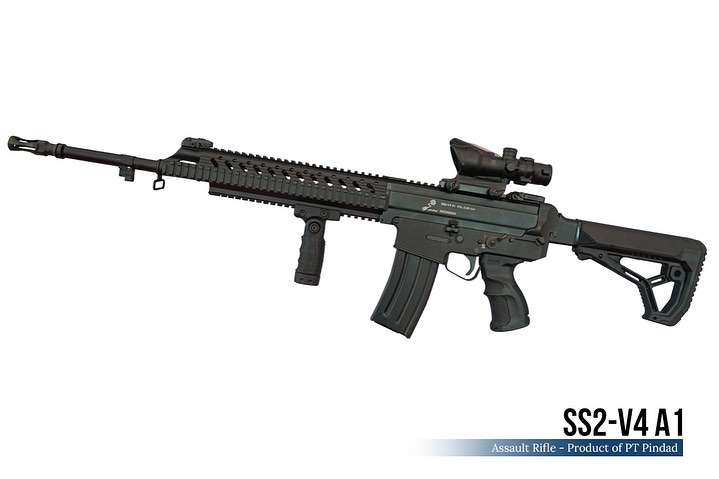
Pindad SS2-V4 A1

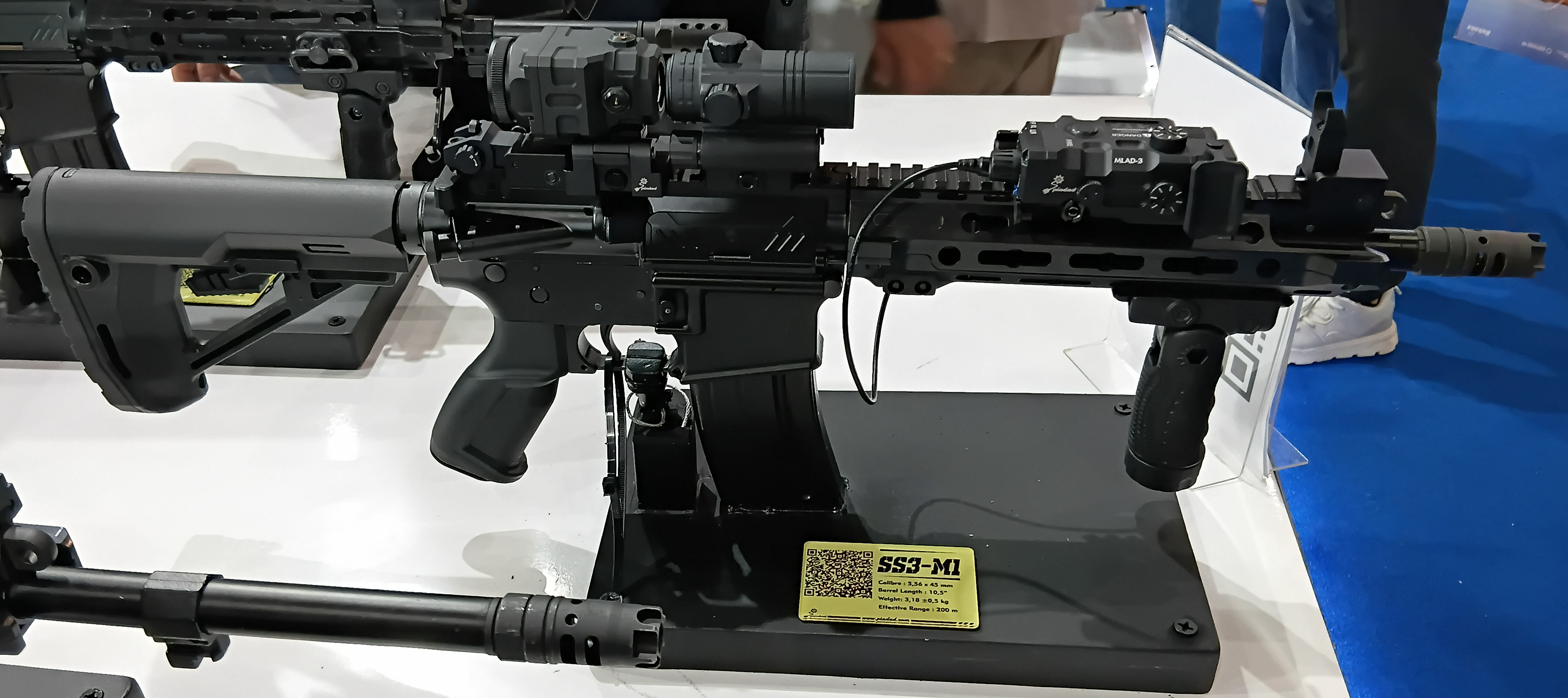
Pindad AM1 (SS3-M1) assault rifle.

Sidearms

- Pindad R1
- Pindad P1
- Pindad P2
- Pindad P3
- Pindad PS-01
- Pindad G2
- Pindad MAG-4
- Pindad Armo

Submachine Guns

- Pindad PM1
- Pindad PM2
- Pindad PM3
- Pindad SKPK

Shotguns

- Pindad SG1

Assault Rifles

- Pindad SS1
- Pindad SS2
- Pindad AM1
- PC 816 V1

Battle Rifles

- SP-1
- Pindad SS3

Designated marksman rifle

- Pindad SPM 1

Machine Guns

- Pindad SMR Madsen Saetter
- Pindad SM2
- Pindad SM3
- Pindad SM5
- Pindad SMB-1

Sniper Rifles

- Pindad SPR-1
- Pindad SPR-2
- Pindad SPR-3
- Pindad SPR-4

Grenade Launchers

- Pindad SPG-1
- Pindad SPG-2
- Pindad SPG-3

Non-lethal weapons

- PG BT1 (stun baton)
- PG Alpha-1 (stun flashlight)
- PG TZ1 (taser)

Mortars

- Pindad Mo-1 Mortar 60mm Mortar
- Pindad Mo-2 Mortar 60mm Mortar
- Pindad Mo-3 Mortar 81mm Mortar
- Pindad 40mm Silent Mortar

Others

- Pindad SPS-1 Anti drone
- Pindad PI Flare gun
- Pindad ME-105 105mm Howitzer
- Pindad PK-1 field knife
- Pindad PL-1 throwing knife

=== Vehicles ===
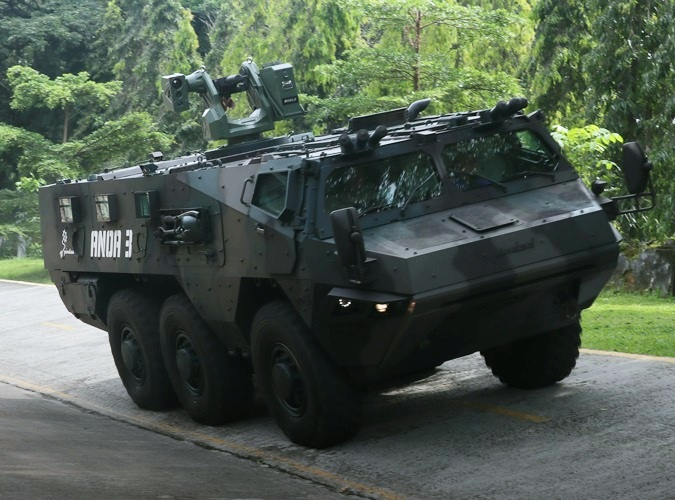
Pindad Anoa 3 6x6 APC.

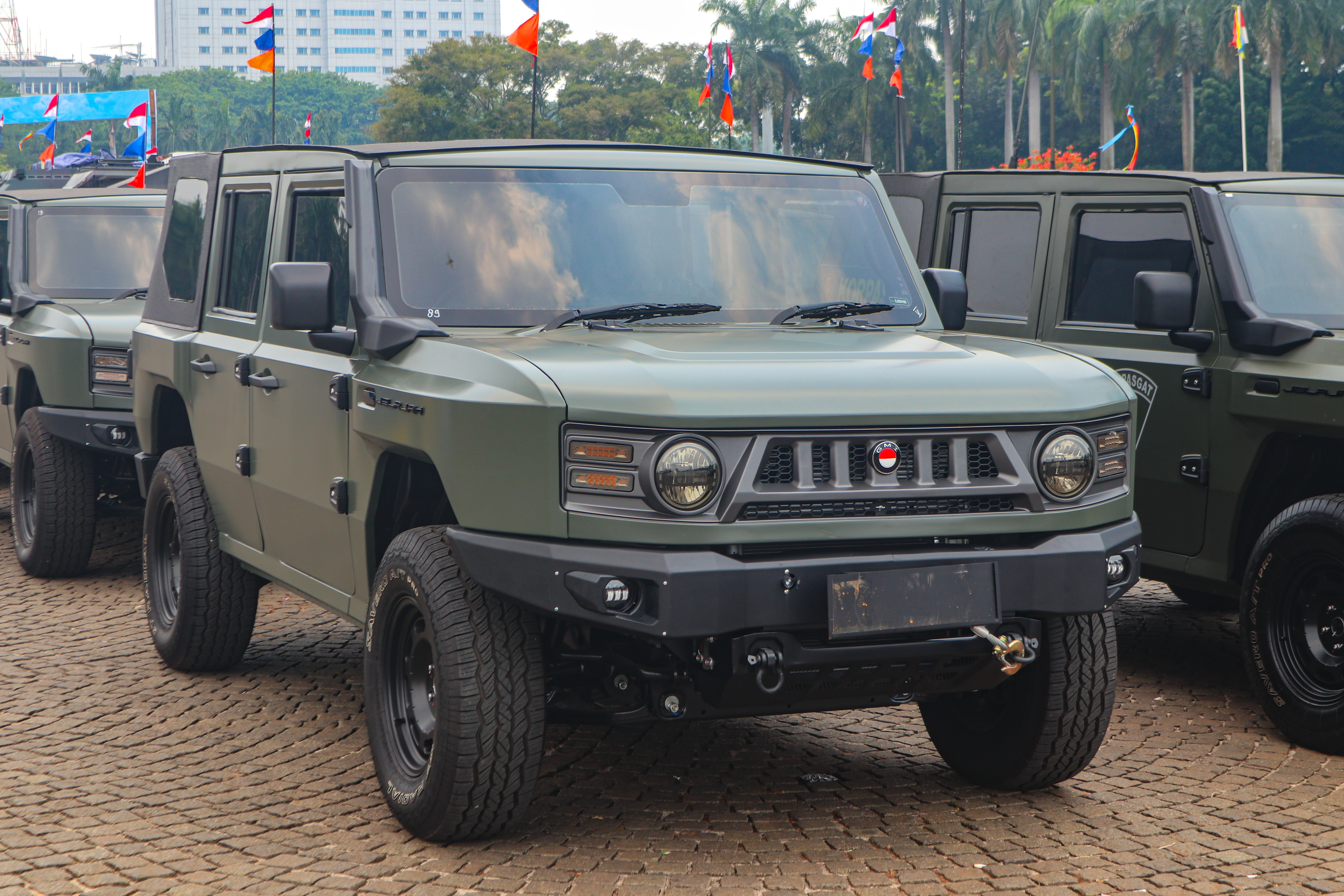
Maung MV3

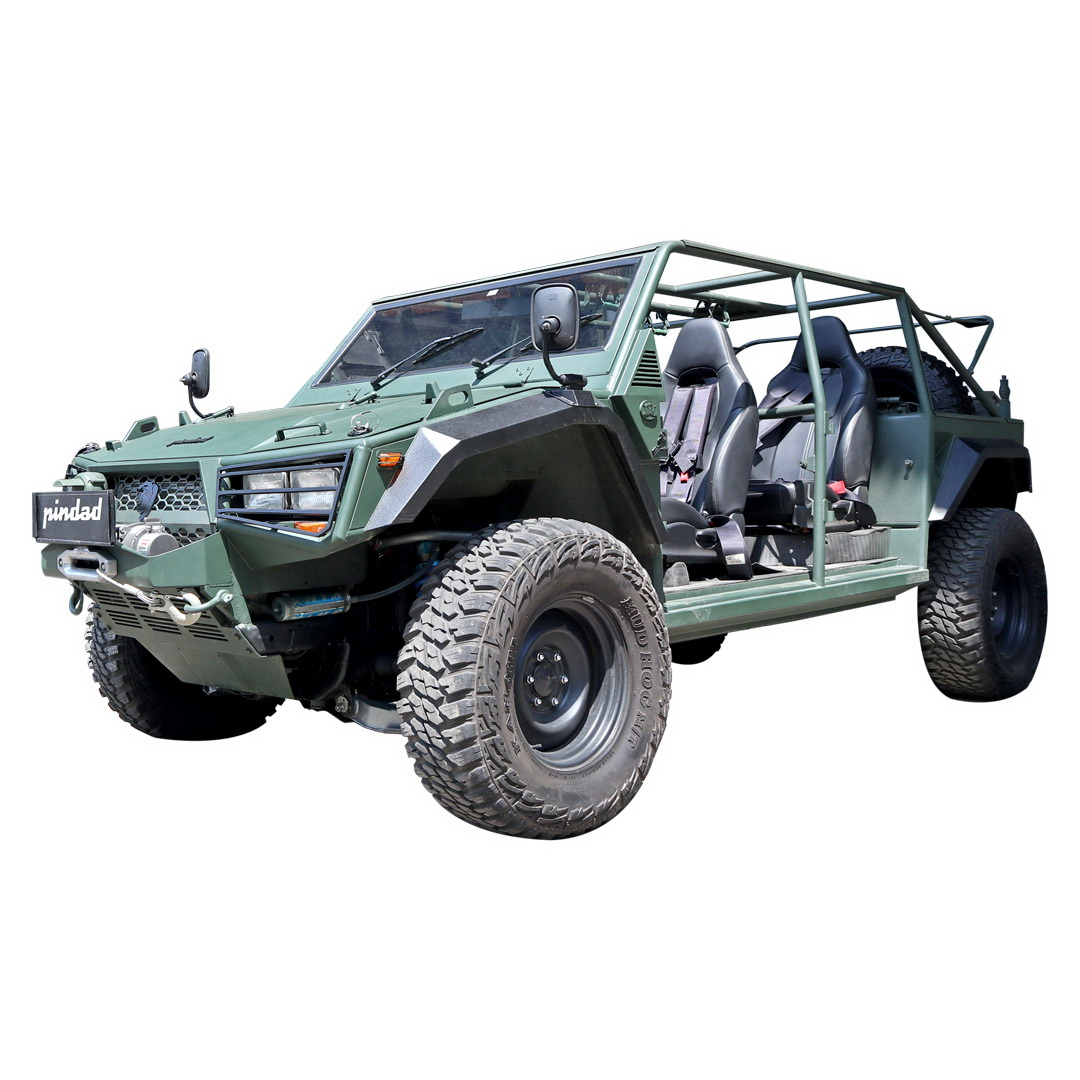
Maung MV1 4x4 Tactical

Armored Vehicles

- Pindad A.yani (APC)
- Pindad U.yani (APC)
- Pindad APR-1V
- Pindad APS-1
- Pindad APS-2
- Pindad APS-3 Anoa
- Pindad Komodo
- Pindad Sanca
- Pindad Elang
- Pindad Cobra
- Pindad Maung

Fire Support Vehicles

- Pindad Badak

Tank

- Harimau

Air-Defense

- Pindad Badak 6x6 SPAAG

Water Vehicles and Machinery

- Work Boat Amphibious (WBA)
- Pindad TPS (Garbage trapper barge)

Civilian Vehicles

- Pindad MotoEV
- Pindad MV2
- Pindad MV3 Garuda
- Kobo K1 Electric Motorcycle

=== Agricultural equipment ===
- Paddy dryer
- PA-1800 (tiller/rotavator)
- PP-160 (harvester)
- AMH-O
- Stungta x Pindad Incinerator

=== Heavy equipment ===
- Excava 50 (excavator)
- Excava 200 (excavator), Excava 200 long arm, Excava 200 amphibious
- PTM-45 (agricultural tractor)
- PTM-90 (agricultural tractor)
- Telehandler
