= Beretta BM 59 =

Beretta BM59
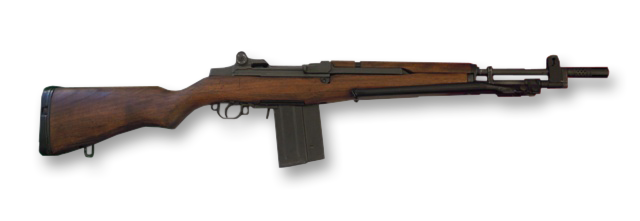
- BM59 battle rifle
- Type: Battle rifle
- Place of origin: Italy

Service history
- In service: 1959–present
- Used by: See Users
- Wars: Nigerian Civil War; Papua conflict Indonesian invasion of East Timor; Lebanese Civil War; Falklands War; Multinational Force in Lebanon; Somali Civil War; 1999 East Timorese crisis Libyan Civil War

Production history
- Designer: Domenico Salza
- Designed: 1950s
- Manufacturer: Beretta, Bandung Weapons Factory, Defence Industries Corporation
- Unit cost: $42 (1962)
- Produced: 1959
- Variants: Mark I, Mark II, III/Ital TA, BM59-Para, Mark IV, BM59E

Specifications
- Mass: 4.4 kg (9.70 lb)
- Length: 1,095 mm (43.1 in)
- Barrel length: 491 mm (19.3 in)
- Cartridge: 7.62×51mm NATO
- Action: Gas-operated, rotating bolt
- Rate of fire: 750 rounds per minute
- Feed system: 20-round detachable box magazine
- Sights: Rear aperture, front post

The BM59 is an automatic battle rifle developed in Italy in 1959. It is based on the M1 Garand rifle, chambered in 7.62×51mm NATO, modified to use a detachable magazine, and capable of selective fire. Later revisions incorporated other features common to more modern rifles.

== History ==
The BM59 was adopted in 1959 and served with Italian, Argentinian, Indonesian, and Moroccan armies. The earliest BM59s were manufactured from U.S.-manufactured M1 parts, including re-chambered barrels.

Beginning in 1990, the BM59 was replaced in Italian service by the Beretta AR70/90 assault rifles, although some may be in service in the Italian Navy.

== Development ==
After World War II, Italy adopted the US-designed M1 Garand rifle in .30-06 Springfield (7.62×63mm) and also manufactured it under license. This semi-automatic rifle proved itself well during World War II, but in the late 1950s it was considered outdated and obsolete and the Italian military also wanted a new rifle chambered for the NATO-standard 7.62×51mm round.

To meet these requirements, Beretta designed the BM59, which was essentially a rechambered M1 fitted with a removable 20-round magazine and capable of selective fire. Additional features include:

- The "tri-compensator" muzzle device, which combines the functions of a muzzle brake, a flash suppressor, and a rifle grenade launcher.
- A stripper clip guide similar to the M1
- A folding bipod attached to the gas cylinder
- A folding shoulder plate similar to the M14 rifle
- A folding grenade sight that doubles as a gas shut-off
- A folding winter trigger

The BM59 has a fire selector on the left side, which consists of “S” (“Semiautomatico”) to “A” (“Automatico”). The standard fixed stock has a hollow space to store cleaning/maintenance kit.

== Variants ==
The BM59 has several military and civilian variants that include the following:

=== Military ===
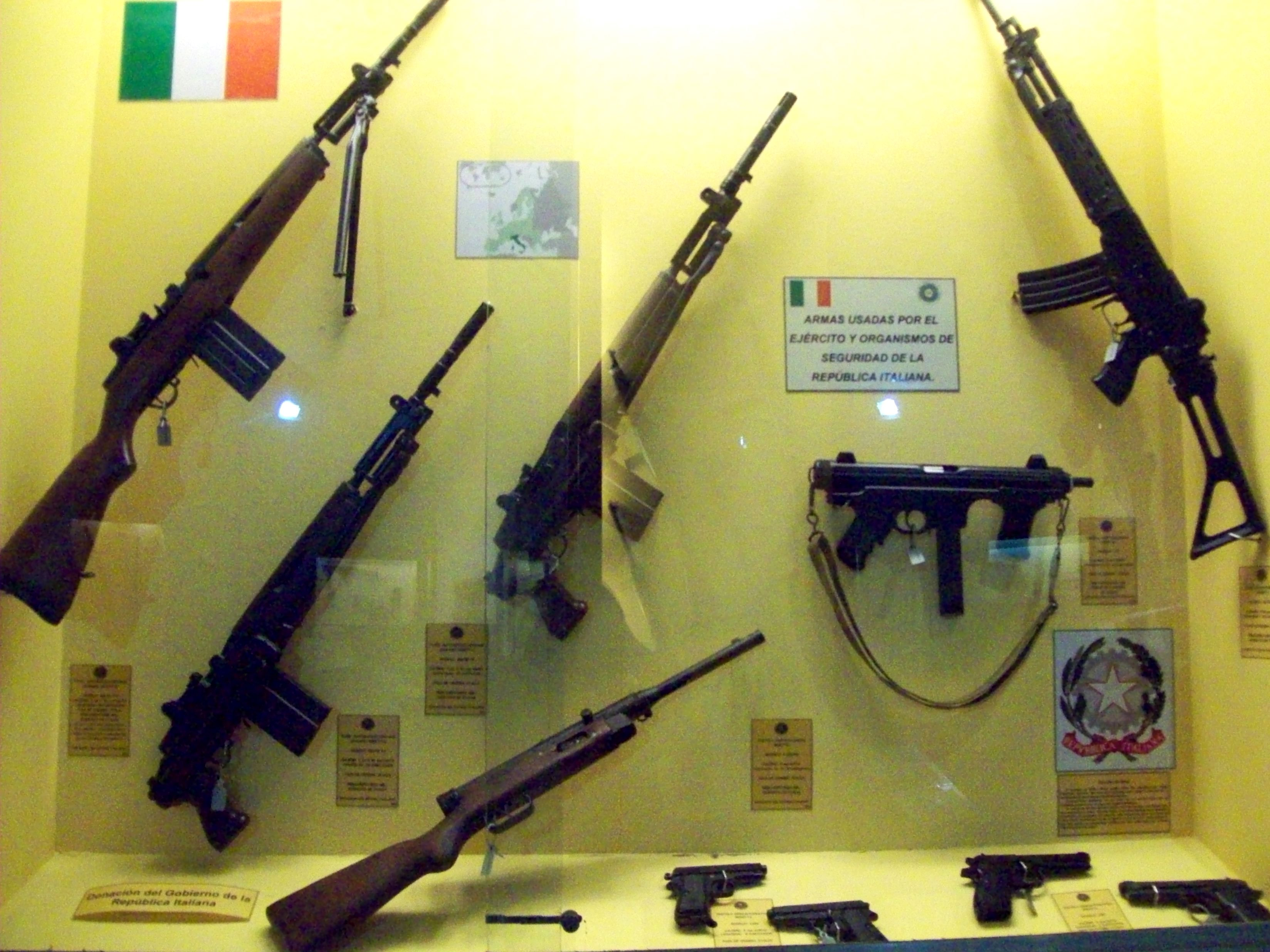
The BM59 (top left) on display at the Museo de Armas de la Nación, Buenos Aires

- BM59 ITAL: Implied "standard" variant with a semi-pistol grip. Described as having a tri-compensator, grenade-launching capacity, and bipods. Barrel length 19.3 inches (49 cm); overall length 43 inches (110 cm); mass 9.7 pounds (4.4 kg).
- BM59 Mark I: Has a wooden stock with a semi-pistol grip stock with a barrel length 17.4 inches (44 cm), no bipod, no grenade launcher, no cartridge clip guide, no bayonet lug. Model found in brochures older than those that mention ITAL.
- BM59 Mark II: Has a wooden stock with pistol grip to achieve a better control during full-auto fire.
- BM59 Mark III: Domestically known as BM59 Ital TA (for Truppe Alpine) or BM59 Alpini. Variant for mountain troops, with a pistol grip and a metal folding buttstock. Barrel length 19.3 inches (49 cm); overall length 43 inches (110 cm) (stock extended) / 33.7 inches (86 cm) (stock folded); mass 9.7 pounds (4.4 kg). Marketed overseas as the Mk. 3.
  - The BM59 Para (also Paracadutisti or ITAL-Para) was similar to BM59 Ital TA, but was intended for paratroopers. It was equipped with a shorter barrel and a removable grenade launcher and tri-compensator. Weights nearly 10 pounds (4.5 kg). Overall length is slightly shorter than 29 inches (74 cm) folded. Attaching the tri-compensator and unfolding the stock increases length to 48 inches (120 cm).
- BM59 Mark IV: Had a heavier barrel with a plastic pistol-grip stock designed for prone-firing, and was used as a light squad automatic weapon. Barrel length 20.8 inches (53 cm), empty mass 12 pounds (5.4 kg), overall length 44.5 inches (113 cm). Some sources consider it a Nigerian variant/type.
- BM59 "E": conversion of customer supplied rifles, maintained the Garand long barrel and front handguard and had no grenade launching devices. The only national military service to adopt this version was the Argentine Navy with approximately 2100 converted rifles originally supplied with American war ships purchased by Argentina during the 50s and 60s.

=== Civilian ===
Small numbers of both semi-automatic and selective-fire BM59s were imported to the United States in the 1960s and 1970s by Beretta. Most were marked "BM59 308 Win Berben Corp NY, NY".

Beretta also developed a civilian sporting variant called the BM62. It is semi-automatic, has no grenade-related components, no bipod, and a civilian flash hider (no bayonet lug, no grenade launcher, no tri-compensator).

In 1984, after Beretta ceased production and imports for the BM59 into the US, Springfield Armory, Inc.'s founder Bob Reese found out about the BM 59 design. He learned in a later visit to the Beretta headquarters that the BM59 machinery were still kept in the underground facility, and managed to purchase "most of the machines and tooling, plus tons of parts and receiver forgings" from Beretta. Using these material, Springfield Armory produced the following semi-automatic rifles:

- Beretta Garand: nearly identical to the M1 Garand with the exception of a slightly reduced length to accommodate the 7.62×51 NATO cartridge.
- BM59 "E": similar to the Beretta BM59 "E" in that it is also an intermediate model, except Springfield Armory does not make it as a conversion. "Retains the Garand's wooden front handguard and steel buttplate, and adds a 20-round box magazine and cartridge clip guide. A different muzzle-brake/flash-hider replaced the Garand's gas cylinder lock. Receiver markings on a photo sample read: P. Beretta, 7.62mm BM59, Gardone V.T., Italia".
- BM50: omits the cartridge clip guide and bayonet lug, similar to Beretta BM 59 Mark I and Mark II. Markings read: "P. Beretta, 7.62mm BM50, Gardone V.T., Italia."
- BM59: nearly identical to Beretta BM59 ITAL.
- BM59 Mark IV: essentially a semi-automatic version of Beretta's BM59 Mark IV. Has a stock similar to the pistol-gripped U.S. M14E2 stock, a carrying handle and a longer barrel.
- BM-62: "classic" sporting rifle with a feature set similar to Beretta's BM62.
- BM-69: BM-62 with the addition of folding bipod and tri-compensator.

=== Foreign variants ===
Pindad SP-1 (Indonesian: Senapan Panjang model-1, lit.: Long Rifle model-1) is a license-made of BM59, with 7.62x51 mm cartridge, manufactured by Pindad Indonesia and entered service for Indonesian military since 1968. Pindad also developed and launched another variants, such as SP-2 variant, which can release rifle grenades mounted on the end of its barrel; and SP-3 variant, which uses a new hand grip and a stabilizing bipod. The rifle was gradually replaced by M16A1 and AK-47 since 1976, then completely replaced by Pindad SS1 since 1991.

In 2010, Pindad re-designed SP-1 for sporting and hunting purposes, it fires 7.62x51 mm cartridge in semi-automatic mode designated for civilians market. It was introduced during SHOT Show 2024, in 23 – 26 January 2024 at Venetian Expo & Caesars Forum, Las Vegas Nevada, United States.

== Users ==
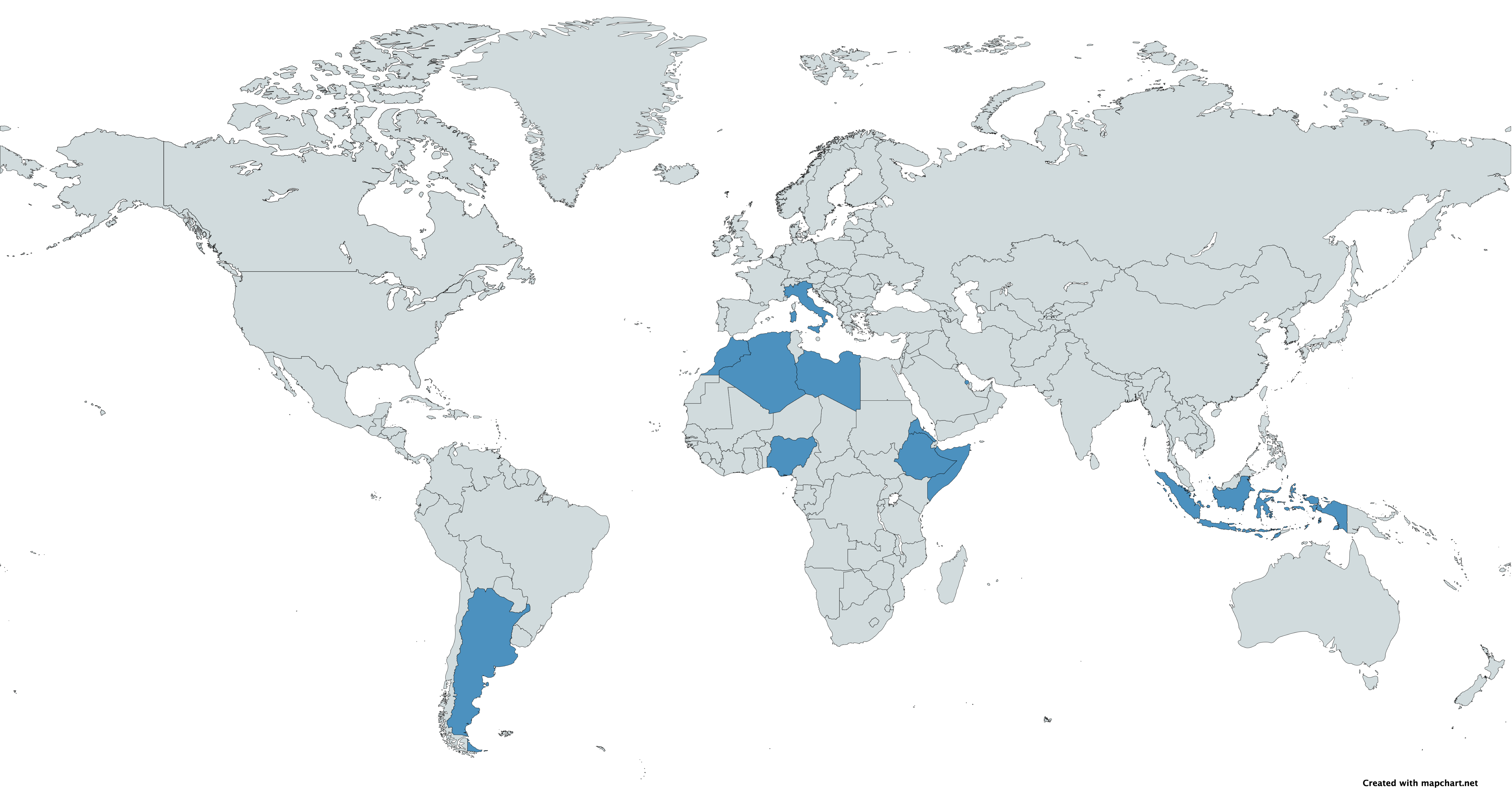
Map with BM 59 users in blue

- Algeria
- Argentina: Used in the Falklands War.
- Bahrain
- Eritrea
- Ethiopia
- Morocco: Built under license
- Nigeria: Under license by Defense Industries Corporation in Kaduna. Adopted by Nigerian Army in 1963.

=== Former ===
- Biafra: Some ex-Nigerian Army rifles
- East Timor: Inherited captured Indonesian SP from the FALINTIL.
- Indonesia: SP (Senapan Panjang) variants built under license by Pindad as the SP-1 (BM59 Mk I), SP-2 (BM59 Mk I with rifle grenade system) and SP-3 (BM59 Mk IV).
- Italy
- Libya
- Somalia

=== Non-state users ===
- Armed Forces for the National Liberation of East Timor (FALINTIL)
- Free Papua Movement
- Pro-Indonesia militias in East Timor

== See also ==
- M14 rifle
- MAS-49 rifle
- Ruger Mini-14
- Springfield Armory M1A
