= Indonesian Forest Rangers =

Indonesian Forest Rangers Polisi Kehutanan Indonesia
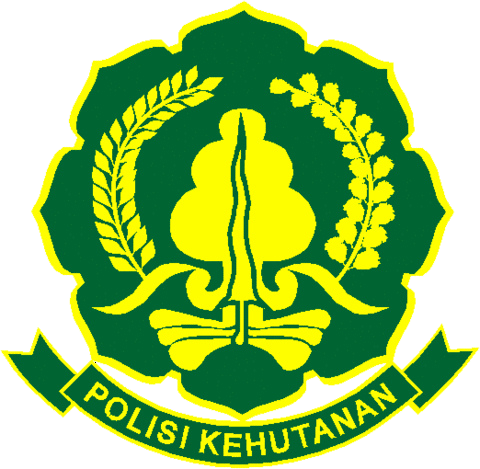
- Emblem of Polhut
- Abbreviation: Polhut

Agency overview
- Formed: 28 May 1999

Jurisdictional structure
- Operations jurisdiction: Indonesia
- Specialist jurisdiction: Environment, parks, heritage property

Operational structure
- Parent agency: Ministry of Environment and Forestry

The Indonesian Forest Rangers (Indonesian: Polisi Kehutanan Indonesia, lit. 'Indonesian Forest Police', abbreviated "Polhut") is a park ranger civil service within the Ministry of Environment and Forestry of Indonesia. It serves on a national and regional level in the country. Polhut is a dedicated unit in the Ministry of Environment and Forestry to preserve and protect forest within its authority given by law in forestry and wildlife. Despite having the word "Polisi", translated as "police", on its name, Polhut is not part of the Indonesian National Police (Polri).

== History ==
=== Dutch colonial rule ===
Before the colonization period of the Netherlands (before 1592), there was no dedicated unit acting as park ranger. However, the function was already covered in customary law and local culture and tradition in preserving and protection forest and its wildlife; these were already done from generation to generation.

Dedicated personnel as park rangers were created, Pengalasan, during the colonization period of the Netherlands.

In 1620, formal rules were introduced, including prohibitions against cutting down forest trees without permits, and the introduction of Boswaker, whose main purpose was to help Pengalasan in preserving and protecting the forest.

In 1870, an agrarian law to define the forest area was introduced. A year later, an official park ranger named Boschwacter was formed with the main task of overseeing any forest boundary violations. The first park ranger school was established in Madiun in 1941.

=== Japanese colonial rule ===
During the colonization period of Japan, the park ranger school in Madiun was closed and re-established in October 1943 as Sinrin Keisatsu Gakkou to train Mantri Polisi Kehutanan, which originated from Boswaker and Pengalasan.

During this period the park rangers were heavily trained in the military style.

=== Independent Indonesia ===
15 years after the independence of Indonesia, Director I Perhutani Central Java (now, Perhutani Unit I Central Java) with Commander of Police 94 Pati considered that it was necessary to form the park ranger police Polisi Chusus Kehutanan (PCK), or Special Forest Police, to tackle security disturbance in the forest within former Keresidenan Pati Central Java.

Minister of Agriculture Decree No 194/Kpts/Um/3/1982 dated 27 March 1982 regarding Special Forestry Police for all Indonesia was issued. The decree also defined the difference between Special Forestry Police and Special Forest Police (for Perhutani territory only).

Minister of Forestry Decree No 471/Kpts-II/1988 dated 30 September 1988, formally revised the Special Forestry Police's name to be Jagawana. Minister of Forestry Decree No 378/Kpts-V/1999 dated 28 Mei 1999, retracted the previous decree and revised the name of Jagawan to be Polisi Kehutanan, abbreviated POLHUT.

== Task and function ==
POLHUT have three main tasks, which are preemptive, preventive and repressive actions.

=== Preemptive ===
Preemptive actions' primary purpose is to prevent, reduce, and eliminate the intent of any person or group to perform forestry crimes. Such actions are as follows:

- Public awareness and counseling
- Guidance and community awareness

=== Preventive ===
Preventive action is any action in order to prevent, reduce, or eliminate any possibility of any person or group to perform forestry crimes. Such action are as follows:

- Forest patrol
- Guard certain areas
- Identification of threats, security problems, or crime potency

=== Repressive ===
Repressive actions consist of but not limited to:

- Law enforcement operations
- Evidence gathering
- Securing evidence
- Suspect arrest operations
- Wildlife conflicts
- Firefighting
- Suspect, witness or evidence escort

== Organization ==
POLHUT organization consists of:

- POLHUT Pusat (National Forest Rangers)
- POLHUT Daerah (Regional Forest Rangers)
- Polhutsus Perhutani (Polisi Kehutanan Khusus Perhutani (forest rangers for Perhutani, whereas Perhutani is a state-owned enterprise which has the duty and authority to manage the state forest resources in Java and Madura)

=== SPORC ===
POLHUT has its own rapid response unit formed in 2005, named SPORC (Satuan Polhut Reaksi Cepat) (Forest Rangers Rapid Response Unit), translated as POLHUT's rapid response unit.

Based on Minister of Forestry decree No.P.75/Menhut-II/2014 regarding POLHUT, SPORC is a unit within POLHUT with enhanced qualification to overcome forestry security issues.

== Weapons ==
POLHUT officers are trained in the use of firearms for protection.

Semi-automatic pistols are issued to most units. SPORC officers are also trained in the use of shotguns and sub-machine guns.

Model	Origin	Type	References
CZ 83	Czechoslovakia	Semi-automatic pistol	
Pindad PM1 A1	Indonesia	Submachine gun	
Pindad PM3	Indonesia	Submachine gun	
Vepr-12	Russia	Shotgun	
