= Pindad APR-1V =

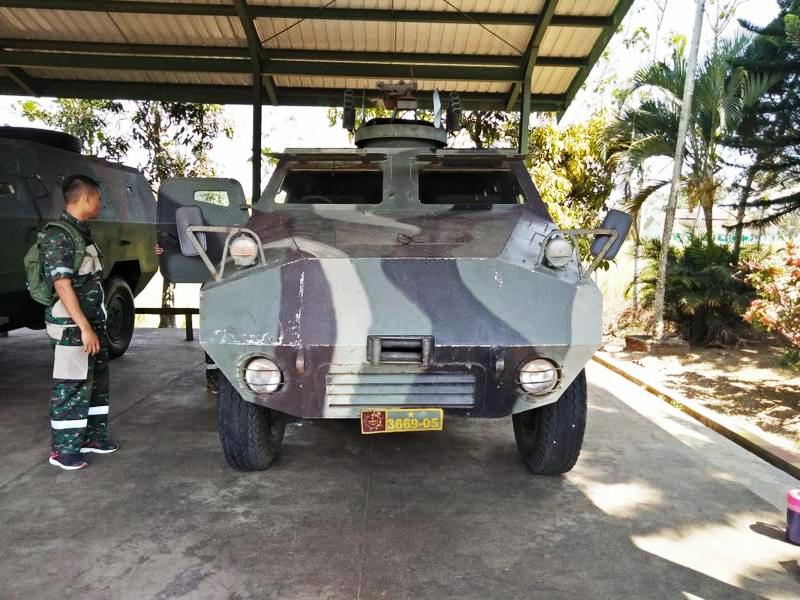
- Front view of APR-1V
- Type: Armoured personnel carrier
- Place of origin: Indonesia

Service history
- Used by: Indonesian Army; Mobile Brigade Corps
- Wars: Insurgency in Aceh

Production history
- Designer: Pindad
- Designed: 1999
- Manufacturer: Pindad
- Produced: 2002–?
- No. built: 14

Specifications
- Mass: 5.2 tons combat weight
- Crew: 2 crew + 10 soldiers

The Pindad APR-1V, also known as the APR-1V, APR-1 and the APR1V1, (Indonesian: Angkut Personel Ringan, lit. 'Light Personnel Carrier') is an armoured personnel carrier made by Indonesian military manufacturer Pindad.

The APR-1V is the first production model in a series of Pindad APCs, which began from a variant that uses 4x4 wheel drive and later developed into APS-1 and APS-2 with 6x4 wheels drive and then redeveloped into the 6x6 APC Anoa.

== History ==
The development history started as a result of increased military intervention in the Aceh province. During the military operations, the Indonesian Army put forward urgent requirements for an armoured personnel carrier for troop transport.

Pindad responded to this requirement in 2004, with the APR-1V chassis based on a commercial Isuzu truck chassis, 14 vehicles were built by Pindad and were sent to Aceh for evaluation and combat trials. However, the follow-on orders for another 26 vehicles were cancelled following the 2004 tsunami.

During the APR-1V's deployment in Aceh, two were damaged. One was damaged from the tsunami while another was destroyed in a vehicle accident.

On September 23, 2021, it's reported that the APR-1V was deployed in combat exercises held from September 14 to 16, 2021.

== Development ==
In 2002, PT Pindad produced the 4×4 APR using Isuzu's frame and 120PS engine. This is continued in 2004–2005 by cooperating with BPPT to produce a 4×4 APS (Medium Personnel Carrier) prototype. The development was then continued by developing armoured vehicles whose components developed indigenously by making a prototype of 6×6 wheeled armoured vehicle using a Perkasa truck undercarriage, including a 220 PS engine and a transmission produced by PT Texmaco.

The APR-1V has a capacity for 12 people. 10 soldiers with a driver and radio operator.

The prototype became the starting point for PT Pindad in developing a 6×6 armoured vehicle with a monocoque body, independent wheel drive and suspension system according to TNI specifications.

=== Armament ===
The APR-1V is equipped with a FN MAG GPMG or a STK 40 AGL on a turret mount; smoke grenade dischargers are also installed on the mount.

== Gallery ==
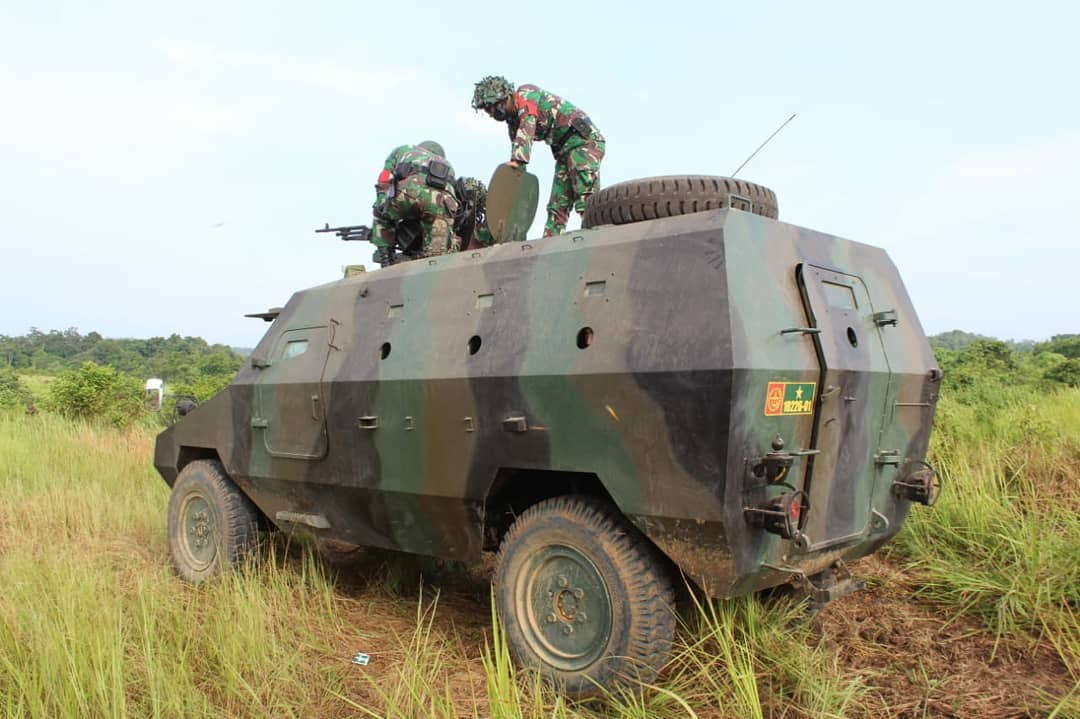
APR-1 of Peleton Kavaleri Serbu (Tonkavser - Assault Cavalry Platoon)

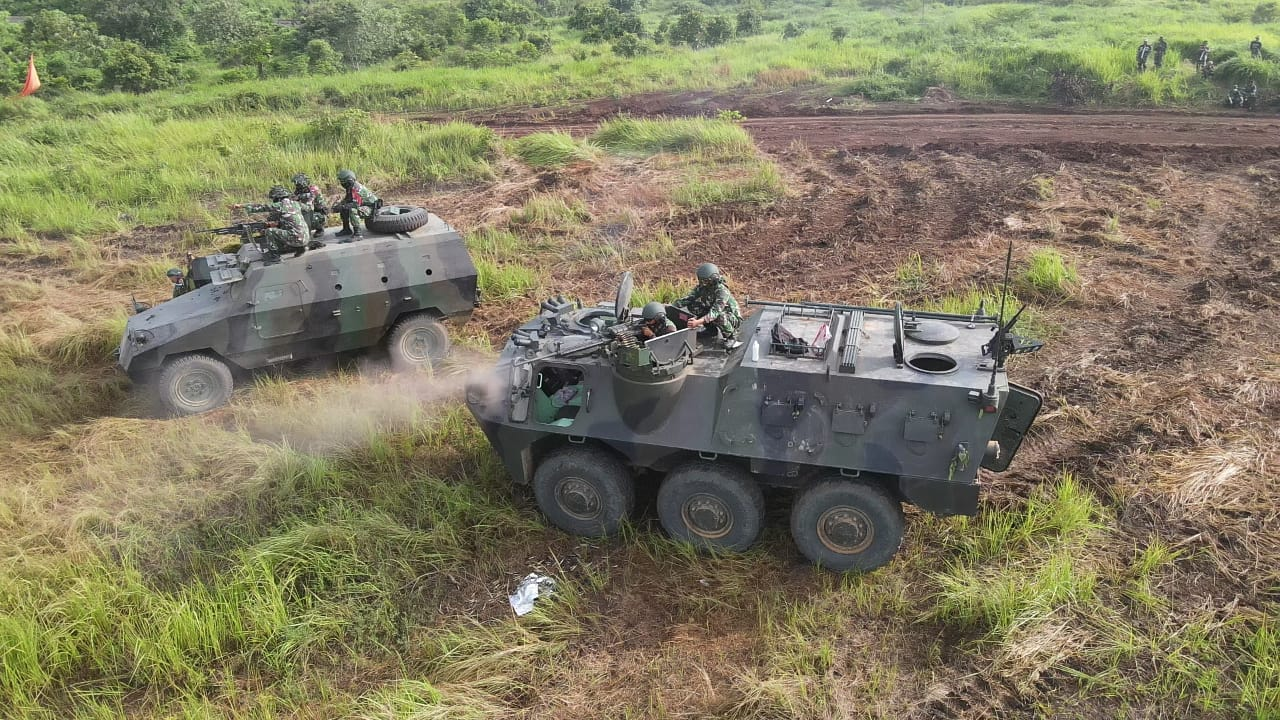
APR-1 and Anoa of Assault Cavalry Platoon, in November 2020 military drill.

== See also ==
- Panhard VBL – (France)
- Otokar Cobra – (Turkey)
