= Pindad PM2 =

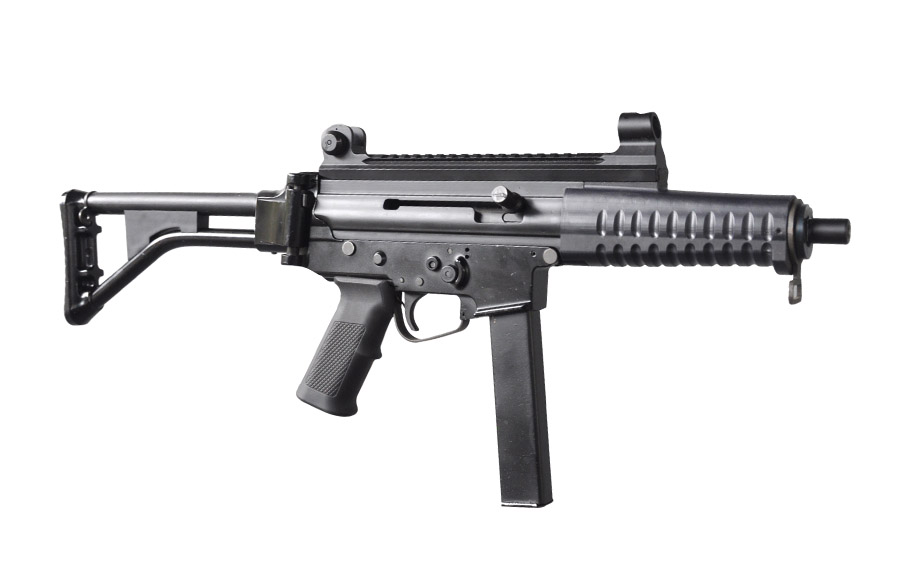
- Pindad PM-2.
- Type: Submachine gun
- Place of origin: Indonesia

Service history
- In service: 2006 to present
- Used by: See Users

Production history
- Designer: PT Pindad
- Manufacturer: PT Pindad

Specifications
- Mass: 2.9 kg (6.4 lb) (with empty magazine), 3.18 kg (7.0 lb) (with magazine)
- Length: 625 mm (24.6 in) (with buttstock extended), 417 mm (16.4 in) (with buttstock retracted)
- Height: 270 mm (with magazine), 225 mm (without magazine)
- Cartridge: 9×19mm Parabellum
- Action: Blowback
- Feed system: 20- or 30-round detachable box magazine
- Sights: Iron; MIL-STD-1913 rail provided for optics

The PM2 (short for Indonesian: "Pistol Mitraliur 2", "Submachine Gun 2") is a submachine gun manufactured by Pindad of Indonesia. This sub-machine gun is intended to be used by forest guard authorities and by law enforcement.

== History ==
Overseas, the PM2 was first shown to foreign visitors at the 2009 Tri-Service Asian Defense and Internal Security Event for Land, Sea and Air and Security event at the IMPACT Exhibition Center in Bangkok, Thailand.

The PM2 went on display in 2013 before VIPs at the Pusat Pendidikan Kavaleri in Bandung.

=== Exports ===
The PM2 was purchased for the PNTL in 2012. Secretary of State Francisco Guterres demanded an answer after a senior PNTL officer informed Tempo Semanala that a training session showed some of the submachine guns were defective. Around PM2-V1s were reported to be defective. An inquiry was set up in 2013 to investigate the issue.

PM2s are used by the PNTL during election security in 2017.

== Design ==
The Pindad PM2 is a submachine gun based on the Pindad SS2, using a similar receiver (although changed to use 9×19mm ammunition), grip, and folding stock. It is designed to exceed the performance of the popular German-made Heckler & Koch MP5. It has a standard MIL-STD-1913 rail on top for optics and comes with a suppressor.

All PM2 types have fixed iron sights.

== Variants ==
=== PM2-V1 ===
The V1 weighs 3.18 kg with its magazine. It is 625 mm long with a blowback firing system, outfitted with a folding stock.

=== PM2-V2 ===
The V2 is fixed with an integral suppressor. It weighs 3.45 kg and is 720 mm long with a folding stock.

=== PM2-V3 ===
The V3 is fixed with a forward grip and is longer than the V1 but shorter than the V2. It has a picatinny rail on the top body and has a different stock and grip design.

== Users ==
- Indonesia: Indonesian Army and Kopassus.
- Timor Leste: 75 PM2-V1s bought from PT Pindad in 2012. PM2s used by the PNTL.
