= 5.56×21mm PINDAD =

Indonesian PDW cartridge

- Type: Pistol cartridge
- Place of origin: Indonesia

Specifications
- Parent case: 5.56×45mm NATO

The 5.56×21mm PINDAD was a personal defence weapon round previously developed in Indonesia. The round is based on the 5.56×45mm NATO cartridge, being a cut down version of it. It is sometimes known as 5.56×23mm.

== History ==
In August 2008, Pindad announced that mass production of the PS-01 with 5.56x21mm rounds was planned after it was certified.

== Development ==
The 5.56×21 2.65 g (~41 gr) projectile fired out of a 190-mm-long (7.5 in) barrel has a muzzle velocity around 508–510 m/s. The cartridge is only used in the Pindad PS-01.

== See also ==
- .22 TCM
