= Pindad PS-01 =

- Type: Semi-automatic pistol
- Place of origin: Indonesia

Service history
- In service: Prototypes only

Production history
- Designer: PT Pindad
- Designed: 2007
- Manufacturer: PT Pindad

Specifications
- Mass: 1.2 kg
- Length: 275 mm (11 in)
- Barrel length: 190 mm (7 in)
- Cartridge: 5.56×21mm PINDAD
- Action: Blowback
- Maximum firing range: 100 m
- Feed system: 18-round detachable box magazine
- Sights: Iron

The Pindad PS-01 (Indonesian: Pistol Serbu, lit. 'Assault Pistol') is a PDW-caliber pistol developed by Pindad. It was meant to be used by special forces units, tank and aircraft crew personnel as a self-defense weapon.

== History ==
The PS-01 was developed by Colonel Rihahanto, who developed the pistol from August to September 2007. Pindad announced in August 2008 that the PS-01 and 5.56x21mm would be mass produced after they get certification.

Working models were first shown at the 2008 Indo Defence Expo & Forum, which was held from November 19-22, 2008.

After field tests were conducted, the Indonesian military dropped the PS-01 from consideration since it did not have full auto capabilities.

== Design ==
The PS-01 can be equipped with a suppressor on the barrel with pistol-based tactical accessories attached underneath the barrel, using 18-round magazines. The pistol has a barrel length of 190 mm and a weight of 1.234 kg. Its effective firing range is at 100 meters.
