= ASEAN Armies Rifle Meet =

Asian countries shooting competition

- Status: Active
- Genre: Military shooting competition
- Frequency: Annual
- Location: Rotates among host member states of ASEAN
- Years active: 34–35
- Founded: 1991
- Founder: Malaysian Army
- Most recent: AARM 2025 (Singapore); November 18-27, 2025
- Next event: AARM 2026
- Participants: Royal Brunei Land Force; Royal Cambodian Army; Indonesian Army; Lao People's Army; Malaysian Army; Myanmar Army; Philippine Army; Singapore Army; Royal Thai Army; People's Army of Vietnam
- Major events: Rifle match; Carbine match; Pistol match (Men); Pistol match (Ladies); Machine gun match
- Organizer: Association of Southeast Asian Nations

The ASEAN Armies Rifle Meet (AARM) is an annual rifle, pistol, and machine gun competition between the armies of the member states of the Association of Southeast Asian Nations (ASEAN). Its aim is to foster friendly competition and goodwill between the members' armies, and to give its officers and men the opportunity for professional interaction and to strengthen their social bonds and camaraderie.

== History ==
The ASEAN Armies Rifle Meet was the brainchild of a Commander-in-Chief of the Malaysian Army, who envisioned the participation of ASEAN armies in a joint military activity. The inaugural AARM was hosted by Malaysia in 1991 and included Brunei, Indonesia, Philippines, Singapore and Thailand as inaugural competitors. Malaysia took the first team championship crown that year.

The 2000 AARM was the first event wherein all ten ASEAN member countries participated, coinciding with the inaugural ASEAN Chiefs of Army Multilateral Meeting (ACAMM). The inaugural ASEAN Army Sergeant Majors Annual Meeting (ASMAM) was held 2011. All three meetings have been regular annual events since then.

As of 2026, Cambodia, Laos and Timor-Leste have yet to host an ASEAN Armies Rifle Meet competition.

== Events ==
The AARM consists of five main match disciplines: rifle, carbine, men's pistol, ladies' pistol, and machine gun. Each discipline consists of an individual and a team match. The top three in each match are awarded gold, silver and bronze medals. The trophy categories include overall individual champion for each discipline, overall team champion for each discipline, and overall champion in the "falling plate" event for each discipline.

== List of champion states ==
Indonesia has won the most number of championships since the AARM began in 1991; the Indonesian Army has 14 championships on record, followed by the Royal Thai Army with eight. Malaysia and Singapore have both won three times, while the Philippines won two times and Vietnam was champion once. Brunei, Cambodia and Laos have yet to win a championship.

In 2019, a new format for competition was adopted wherein the participating ASEAN member states were grouped into four teams, Team Alligator, Team Bear, Team Cheetah and Team Dragon. Team Alligator emerged as champion that year.

| | Year | Host | Champion |
|---|---|---|---|
| 1 | 1991 | Malaysia | Malaysia |
| 2 | 1992 | Indonesia | Indonesia |
| 3 | 1993 | Brunei | Malaysia |
| 4 | 1994 | Thailand | Thailand |
| 5 | 1995 | Philippines | Singapore |
| 6 | 1996 | Singapore | Singapore |
| 7 | 1997 | Malaysia | Malaysia |
| 8 | 1998 | Indonesia | Thailand |
| 9 | 1999 | Brunei | Thailand |
| 10 | 2000 | Thailand | Thailand |
| 11 | 2001 | Philippines | Thailand |
| 12 | 2002 | Singapore | Singapore |
| 13 | 2003 | Malaysia | Thailand |
| 14 | 2004 | Indonesia | Indonesia |
| 15 | 2005 | Brunei | Philippines |
| 16 | 2006 | Vietnam | Indonesia |
| 17 | 2007 | Thailand | Thailand |
| 18 | 2008 | Philippines | Indonesia |
| 19 | 2009 | Singapore | Indonesia |
| 20 | 2010 | Malaysia | Indonesia |
| 21 | 2011 | Indonesia | Indonesia |
| 22 | 2012 | Brunei | Indonesia |
| 23 | 2013 | Myanmar | Indonesia |
| 24 | 2014 | Vietnam | Indonesia |
| 25 | 2015 | Thailand | Thailand |
| 26 | 2016 | Philippines | Indonesia |
| 27 | 2017 | Singapore | Indonesia |
| 28 | 2018 | Malaysia | Indonesia |
| 29 | 2019 | Indonesia | Team Alligator |
| 30 | 2022 | Vietnam | Vietnam |
| 31 | 2023 | Thailand | Indonesia |
| 32 | 2024 | Philippines | Philippines |
| 33 | 2025 | Singapore | Philippines |
