= Texmaco Perkasa =

Indonesian truck and bus

Overview
- Manufacturer: PT Wahana Perkasa Auto Jaya
- Production: 1999–2004

Body and chassis
- Class: Truck and Bus
- Body style: Truck, bus

Powertrain
- Engine: Steyr Motors WD612 6-cylinder 6.500 cc, power: 195 PS (type B 07 A and B 07 B), 220 PS (type B 07 BI), and 240 PS (type BiS)
- Transmission: ZF6s-680, ZF6S-90

Texmaco Perkasa is a family of medium-duty commercial vehicles manufactured by Indonesian automaker PT Wahana Perkasa Auto Jaya, which is a company under the Texmaco group. Started production after the New Order in 1999 by making trucks, and in 2001 finally participated in producing variants of bus vehicles. Perkasa means "mighty" in Indonesian. These vehicles are well known in Indonesia for being the standard trucks and buses operated by the Indonesian Armed Forces. Perkasa truck was first launched in late 1998, with a claim of 90% local content. TNI (Indonesian armed forces) and Polri (Indonesian national police) are the first customers, intended as military vehicles (kendaraan militer — ranmil) and tactical vehicles (kendaraan taktis — rantis). Perkasa stopped production in 2004 after the Texmaco group went bankrupt by IBRA.

== Description ==
=== Truck ===
The Perkasa truck is claimed to have a local content of more than 90%, and was claimed as using the best technology in its class. Texmaco licensed technology from a variety of well-known truck and spare parts manufacturers in the world. As a core part, Texmaco licenses diesel engines, gears, axles, from Austrian manufacturer Steyr, they also licensed Cummins diesel engines from the United States. The diesel engine licensed by Perkasa (Texmaco Group) is a Steyr WD Series diesel engine, namely the WD 612 series and WD 602 series, the WD 612 series diesel engine is an inline 6 cylinder configuration engine with a capacity of 6956 cc, the bore × stroke size of this engine is 108 × 120 mm, the character of the engine is overstroke so that the torque is huge while the rpm is low. The engines used are:

A: Steyr Diesel WD612 A, 195 Ps (220Ps-JIS) at 2,400 rpm, 650 Nm of torque at 1,300 rpm

B: Steyr Diesel WD612 B, 220 Ps (250Ps-JIS) at 2,400 rpm, torque 720 Nm at 1,300 rpm

C: Steyr Diesel WD612 C, 240 Ps (265Ps-JIS) at 2,400 rpm, torque 825 Nm at 1,300 rpm

The transmission adopts the famous German brand ZF, while the axle used is licensed from Eaton America. For the civilian version, Perkasa markets 3 truck variants, namely Perkasa T30H (tractor head), Perkasa Bromo 195 ps 4×2, and Perkasa Bromo 220 ps 6×4. All production model of Perkasa used Leyland derived cabin. Perkasa also has one truck prototype called Laskar, a tractor head that uses the cabin from DAF.

=== Bus ===
The bus version is produced in 3 types, the first is front engined with code B 07 A, second rear engined with code B 07 B, B 07 Bi, the third is B 07 BiS for the ones with Turbo Intercooler engines. All variants of the Perkasa bus production use engines licensed from Steyr Motors GmbH, headquartered in Austria, type WD612 6-cylinder inline configuration of 6,500 cc with a power output of 195 PS (for types B 07 A and B 07 B) 220 PS for type B 07 BI, and 240 PS for the BiS type, and in 1997 this engine also passed the Euro 2 emission test in Europe.

The engine is assembled with the chassis in Purwakarta, and combined it with the ZF transmission. This German-imported transmission is used for the Perkasa Bus series A (front) and B (rear). The transmission used ZF6s-680 which has a short-ratio character, and for an engine that uses a Turbo Intercooler, Perkasa paired it with the ZF6S-90 which has a longer gear ratio.

The chassis itself consists of two variants with a length of 11,325 mm for the front engine and 11,675 mm for the rear engine variant. The wheelbase is 5,800 mm (A, front engine) and 6,000 mm (B), almost the same as the wheelbase of the Hino RG, equipped with the American-manufactured Eaton front-rear axle. In the specifications, the front axle can withstand loads of 7,725 kg and for the rear can withstand up to 10.5 tons. The vehicle has full air brake system S-Cam, where the drum has a diameter of 419 mm x 160 mm.

== Operators ==
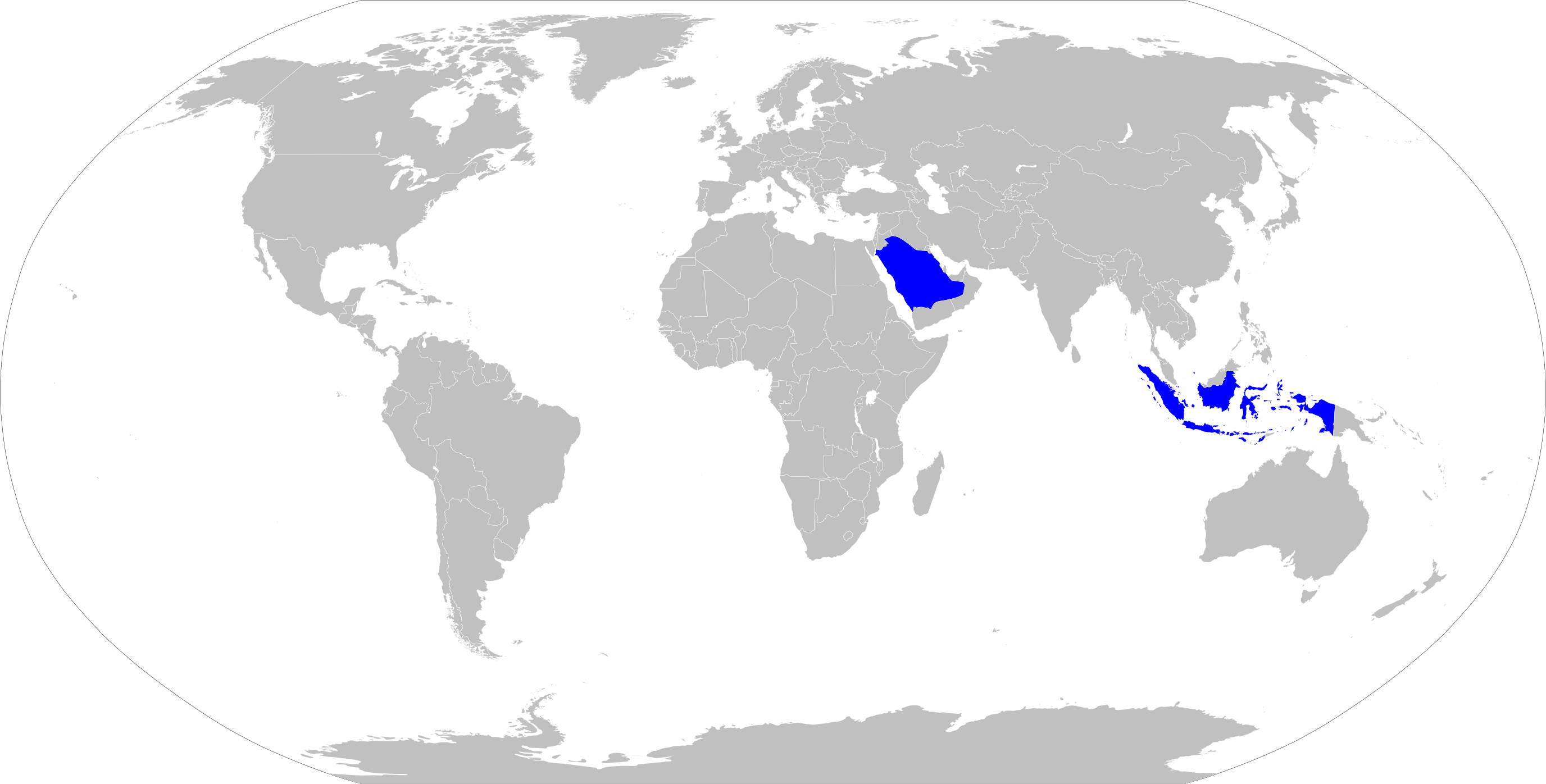
Perkasa user marked in blue.

- Indonesia: Used by armed forces and police. Production number for civilian usage is not known.
- Saudi Arabia: 100 units of Perkasa bus has been sold to Saudi Arabia for commercial use.

== See also ==
- Pindad
- AMMDes
