= List of killings by law enforcement officers in the United States, April 2024 =

This is a list of people reported killed by non-military law enforcement officers in the United States in April 2024, whether in the line of duty or not, and regardless of reason or method. The listing documents the occurrence of a death, making no implications regarding wrongdoing or justification on the part of the person killed or officer involved. Killings are arranged by date of the incident that caused death. Different death dates, if known, are noted in the description. The table below lists 123 people.

== April 2024 ==
Date	Name (age) of deceased	Race	Location	Description
2024-04-30	Devon Allen (25)	Black	New York City, New York	When members of NYPD and federal task force tried to arrest the man, the man fled and took out a gun during the chase. The federal task force members then fatally shot him.
2024-04-30	Jaevel Boulding (32)	Black	San Antonio, Texas	After conducting a welfare check, police officers found a woman who was shot to death in the morning. Then they started to track the suspect who stole her car. In the night, officers approached the suspect after he entered the car, he then opened fire at officers before being shot and killed. It was determined that the woman was the suspect's wife.
2024-04-30	Steven MacLean (35)	White	Raynham, Massachusetts	Four police officers were called to conduct a welfare check. When McClean opened his door, he pointed a gun at the officers before being fatally shot.
2024-04-30	James Summers Bennett (45)	Native American	Billings, Montana	
2024-04-30	Christian Acosta (39)	Unknown	Cove, Texas	
2024-04-30	Jasmine Denise Rhodes-Castro (30)	White	Lakewood, Colorado	Thornton police officers followed a car for about 13 miles after they noticed a car without license plate. One of the suspect exited the vehicle and fired at officers, he then entered the vehicle and the pursuit continued for about 3 miles. Two suspects then exited the vehicle, one of them was armed with a firearm. Police officers then fired their service weapons fatally striking them both.
2024-04-30	Joby Vigil (31)	White	Lakewood, Colorado	Thornton police officers followed a car for about 13 miles after they noticed a car without license plate. One of the suspect exited the vehicle and fired at officers, he then entered the vehicle and the pursuit continued for about 3 miles. Two suspects then exited the vehicle, one of them was armed with a firearm. Police officers then fired their service weapons fatally striking them both.
2024-04-29	unidentified male	Unknown	Los Angeles, California	A LAPD cruiser was T-boned by a vehicle which caused the cruiser to spin into the crosswalk, struck and killed a pedestrian.
2024-04-29	Arlette Christina Wiggins (40)	White	Lumberton, North Carolina	
2024-04-29	Adrian Jose Guzman (37)	Latino	Chaparral, New Mexico	Police responded to a possible burglary. After a short chase and a reported fight, Guzman allegedly pointed a taser at an officer. The officer shot Guzman, killing him.
2024-04-29	Andrew "Andy" Hyun Song (45)	Asian	Happy Valley, Oregon	Police receive a report that a man was armed with a knife and had poured gasoline inside the home. Tactical officers arrived and negotiated with the man but he made a deadly threat toward his family. Officers then shot and killed him.
2024-04-29	Luis Miquel Navarro (38)	Hispanic	Converse, Texas	Navarro was shot and killed by a DPS trooper after a high-speed pursuit.
2024-04-29	Terry Clark Hughes Jr (39)	Black	Charlotte, North Carolina	2024 Charlotte shootout: A U.S. Marshals Service task force attempted to serve a warrant on a man for being a felon in possession of a weapon. two suspects fired at the officers, killing four officers and wounding four. Terry Clark Hughes Jr, the target of the warrant, was killed by police. It was later confirmed that Deputy Marshal Thomas M. Weeks, Investigator William "Alden" Elliot, Samuel Poloche, and Officer Joshua Eyer were killed in the shootout.
2024-04-29	Angela Jaques (44)	Unknown	Abilene, Texas	Jaques allegedly shot at a person. Police engaged in a standoff for several hours before Jaques reportedly fired on them; the officers returned fire and killed her.
2024-04-28	Michael John Wiederrich (40)	White	Saco, Montana	Wiederrich, a shooting suspect, led police on a pursuit after threatening them. During the pursuit, he rammed into a police vehicle and disabling it. A police shooting occurred and he was killed.
2024-04-28	Michael Ward (33)	White	Beloit, Wisconsin	
2024-04-28	Cameron James Bielman (30)	White	Linn County, Oregon	The initial shooting happened in Coburg. The police later spotted the suspect’s vehicle and a pursuit occurred. Shortly after the pursuit ended, state troopers and Linn County deputies shot the suspect and a passenger in the vehicle in unknown circumstances. The passenger is injured and the suspect died.
2024-04-28	Matthew Lathers (31)	Black	Kenner, Louisiana	At the end of a standoff, a SWAT sniper from Jefferson Parish Sheriff's Office fatally shot Lathers, who was inside of a dwelling. In the same incident, five other people were shot and injured.
2024-04-28	Edgin Tavera (38)	Hispanic	Houston, Texas	After officers responded to an exposure call, they encountered a naked suspect, later identified as Tavera. Tavera fought with officers and was being tased once. Tavera became unresponsive about a minute after being arrested. He was later pronounced deceased at a hospital.
2024-04-28	Mikey Valdez (18)	Latino	San Antonio, Texas	The man was shot by a SAPD police officer shortly after reportedly shooting a 20-year-old Albert Cisneros Jr at Market Square. Both Valdez and Cisneros were pronounced dead at a hospital. Four bystanders were injured by gunfire.
2024-04-27	Jamauri Griffin (25)	Black	Knoxville, Tennessee	Police received a report of a man with a gun during a domestic violence situation. Shortly after they arrived, Griffin purportedly shot and injured a woman, which prompted the officers to fatally shoot him.
2024-04-27	Thomas Dray Price (44)	White	Austin, Texas	Austin Police officers fatally the man shot after he reportedly armed a gun in their direction at an apartment complex.
2024-04-27	Brian James Propes (42)	White	Chipley, Florida	Police were serving a warrant on Propes for child sexual abuse charges when he allegedly began fighting them and produced a firearm. Officers fatally shot Propes, who died at the scene.
2024-04-27	Robert Anthony Vicena (37)	White	New Haven, Indiana	Three New Haven Police officers responded to a call about a domestic battery. When they tried to arrest Vicena, a fight reportedly broke out and Vicena stabbed two officers before getting shot.
2024-04-27	Jamil Moreland (28)	Unknown	Pompano Beach, Florida	A deputy struck and killed a suspect lying on the road
2024-04-27	Kyran Caples (26)	Black	Lakeland, Florida	
2024-04-26	James Q. Hampton (30)	Black	Memphis, Tennessee	Police officers shot and killed Hampton after he purportedly sped toward them while they were serving a search warrant.
2024-04-26	Brandon Salgado (17)	Unknown	Long Beach, California	SWAT team officers shot and killed an armed man after a home invasion robbery in Long Beach.
2024-04-26	Christian Avalos Gonzales (38)	Hispanic	Peoria, Arizona	Police responded to a report about 38-year-old Gonzales firing a gun from his truck in the street. Police reportedly located him in the driveway with a gun before fatally shot him.
2024-04-25	Kevin Jeffrey Burks (32)	Unknown	Eureka, California	Burks allegedly shot and injured a 75-year-old woman. When deputies were chasing him, he reportedly pointed a gun at them before being shot. He died 9 days later.
2024-04-25	Michael Bassey (31)	Black	Arlington, Texas Officer Keany initially shot and injured Michael Bassey who died shortly after at the hospital.	
2024-04-25	Gilmar Tista-Morente (19)	Unknown	Knoxville, Alabama	
2024-04-25	unidentified male	Unknown	Yulee, Florida	Police responded to a suicidal man at a cemetery. They allegedly found a man with a pistol and shot him dead when he reportedly pointed the gun at them.
2024-04-25	Caden Mura (20)	White	Valparaiso, Indiana	Police received a report of a suspicious man who was allegedly waving around a handgun. When the officers arrived, they encountered Mura who matched the description. Police officers then shot and killed him during an shootout of a foot chase.
2024-04-25	Benoit Pasteur (38)	Black	Palm Beach County, Florida	Police shot and killed Pasteur who possessed a rifle and shotgun and allegedly pointed the guns at random people and officers.
2024-04-24	Michael David Dennis (29)	White	Orlando, Florida	In Downtown Orlando, Dennis was pulled over by Orlando Police. He reportedly then exited his vehicle with a handgun and shot at the officers, who then shot and killed him. Dennis had warrants out for his arrest on charges of attempted murder and stalking.
2024-04-23	Jacob Henson (31)	White	Sandersville, Georgia	A Georgia Department of Corrections inmate allegedly took an officer's gun and ran away. He encountered a second guard, who shot and killed him.
2024-04-21	Anthony Johnson Jr. (31)	Black	Fort Worth, Texas	
2024-04-21	Richard Zonjic (52)	White	Rock Hill, South Carolina	While serving warrants at a residence, officers fatally shot Zonjic occurred in unclear circumstances.
2024-04-21	Shawn Elrod (33)	White	Easley, South Carolina	Elrod was shot to death by police outside a Walmart after he allegedly confronted them with a hatchet.
2024-04-21	Dennis Mulqueen (65)	White	Boise, Idaho	Mulqueen shot and killed Ada County Sheriff's Department officer Tobin Bolter during a traffic stop on the evening of April 20. Shortly after midnight on April 21, Mulqueen was shot dead by officers after he reportedly fired at police.
2024-04-21	Sachin Kumar Sahoo (42)	Asian	San Antonio, Texas	Police responded to an aggravated assault on April 20 and found a 51-year-old woman, who had been allegedly struck by her 42-year-old roommate with a truck. The man returned to the scene after midnight on April 21 and reportedly drove into officers, injuring two before an officer opened fire and killed the suspect.
2024-04-20	Jabril Cheevers (14)	Black	Waldo, Florida	Police pursued a stolen vehicle containing four teenages, and performed a PIT maneuver when the driver refused to stop. The vehicle rolled and collided with a cement pole, killing two teens at the scene, and two in hospital. Two of the teens wearing ankle monitors, two were wearing ski masks, two were ex-convicts, three had active warrants, and all were students at Newberry High School.
2024-04-20	Lawrence McClendon (17)	Black	Waldo, Florida	Police pursued a stolen vehicle containing four teenages, and performed a PIT maneuver when the driver refused to stop. The vehicle rolled and collided with a cement pole, killing two teens at the scene, and two in hospital. Two of the teens wearing ankle monitors, two were wearing ski masks, two were ex-convicts, three had active warrants, and all were students at Newberry High School.
2024-04-20	Teleak Roberts (16)	Black	Waldo, Florida	Police pursued a stolen vehicle containing four teenages, and performed a PIT maneuver when the driver refused to stop. The vehicle rolled and collided with a cement pole, killing two teens at the scene, and two in hospital. Two of the teens wearing ankle monitors, two were wearing ski masks, two were ex-convicts, three had active warrants, and all were students at Newberry High School.
2024-04-20	Philemon Moore (16)	Black	Waldo, Florida	Police pursued a stolen vehicle containing four teenages, and performed a PIT maneuver when the driver refused to stop. The vehicle rolled and collided with a cement pole, killing two teens at the scene, and two in hospital. Two of the teens wearing ankle monitors, two were wearing ski masks, two were ex-convicts, three had active warrants, and all were students at Newberry High School.
2024-04-20	Jesus Nunez (65)	Latino	New York City, New York	Patrolling officers encountered a domestic dispute, allegedly finding Nunez holding a woman hostage with a knife. After a failed taser deployment, an officer shot and killed Nunez.
2024-04-20	Bryan Christopher White (33)	Black	Elizabeth City, North Carolina	White shot and killed a 39-year-old man before a nearby patrolling officer shot him to death.
2024-04-20	Daniel Jordan Russell (32)	Black	Paris, Tennessee	
2024-04-20	Iverson Latrell Black (24)	Unknown	Alton, Utah	
2024-04-20	Colten Foster (26)	White	Corpus Christi, Texas	Police responding to a domestic dispute were reportedly shot at by Foster, injuring one officer. Other officers returned fire and killed him. Corpus Christi Police Department officer Kyle Hicks, who was injured during the shootout, died in the hospital four days after the incident.
2024-04-19	Joseph Mudd III (44)	Unknown	Catalina, Arizona	Police responded to a man with a knife holding a hostage at a group home. An officer fatally shot the suspect after reportedly giving several commands, which the suspect did not follow.
2024-04-19	Santiago Elias Alfaro Munoz (36)	Hispanic	Whitehall, Ohio	Police responded to gunshots and found two men in a parked car. One man surrendered to police, and the other was shot dead by officers after he allegedly reached for an unknown object. A handgun was recovered inside the vehicle.
2024-04-18	Jared Michael Billard (33)	White	Colchester, Connecticut	Billard was shot and killed by police responding to a disturbance when he allegedly pointed a gun at them.
2024-04-18	Derrick Smith (34)	Black	Lorain, Ohio	During a federal warrant conducted by the United States Marshals Service and supported by local police, Smith allegedly assaulted officers with a wooden table leg. Police shot and killed him.
2024-04-18	Frank Tyson (53)	Black	Canton, Ohio	When Canton police officers responded a report of a crash, a motorist directed police to the bar, a woman asked the police to get Tyson out of there. Police officers then handcuffed Tyson while he was resisting. They then restrained him with a knee on his back. Five minutes later, officers check his pulse and found him dead after CPR. The officers involved was charged with reckless homicide.
2024-04-18	Steven Scott (39)	White	Gwinnett County, Georgia	Police conducted a traffic stop, but Scott fled and reportedly engaged in a shootout with officers. Police returned fire, killing Scott.
2024-04-17	Erica Allen (26)	Black	Toledo, Ohio	Allen reportedly slashed her grandmother with a knife while suffering from a mental episode. An officer arrived and shot Allen as she allegedly approached her children. When she reportedly stood up and continued towards the children, he shot her again. She died shortly before midnight at ProMedica Toledo Hospital.
2024-04-17	Samuel Sterling (25)	Black	Kentwood, Michigan	Sterling, who fleeing state troopers, died after he was struck by an unmarked cruiser.
2024-04-17	William Charles McBride Jr. (41)	Black	Knoxville, Tennessee	Police responded to a disturbance inside an Exxon gas station, where they found McBride allegedly armed with two knives. When he reportedly confronted an officer, police fatally shot him.
2024-04-17	Bruce Coval Meneley (67)	White	Tukwila, Washington	Police fatally shot Meneley at a DoubleTree hotel when he allegedly brandished a firearm. They were attempting to arrest him in an investigation on crimes against children.
2024-04-17	Ronald James Courtney (61)	White	Pueblo, Colorado	Police responded to reports of animal cruelty at a residence. A fatal officer-involved shooting occurred in unclear circumstances after a suspect was discovered.
2024-04-17	Donald Washington (46)	Black	Long Beach, California	Police shot and killed Washington in MacArthur Park. He was allegedly told to drop his weapon multiple times, but refused.
2024-04-17	Dominique Broadt (32)	White	Oakland, California	Oakland Police Department officers assisted a homicide investigation conducted at a home by the Sacramento Police Department. Broadt allegedly exited the house and was shot dead by Oakland officers.
2024-04-16	unidentified male	Unknown	Chelyan, West Virginia	A man stabbed a woman in their home. When he allegedly pointed a firearm at responding officers, they shot and killed him.
2024-04-16	Trevor James Myrick (26)	White	Ector County, Texas	Myrick shot and killed a 74-year-old homeowner in Odessa and stole his 2014 Ford Mustang before engaging in several other vehicular thefts. He was killed by police.
2024-04-16	Joshua Campbell (18)	Black	Ferguson, Missouri	Campbell fatally shot 26-year-old Detarius Haynes in the parking lot of a QuikTrip. Shortly after Campbell was shot by a Ferguson police officer, who witnessed the shooting when he exited the store.
2024-04-15	Walter Ernest Young Sr. (50)	Unknown	St. Louis, Missouri	
2024-04-15	Guyvenson Innocent (35)	Black	Ocean Township, Monmouth County, New Jersey	
2024-04-14	Patrick Hurst (47)	Black	Houston, Texas	Hurst was fatally shot by Harris County Sheriff’s deputies after exchanging gunfire with them during a traffic stop.
2024-04-14	Christopher Murphy (33)	White	Liverpool, New York	Murphy fatally shot a Syracuse Police officer and Onondaga County Sheriff's deputy before Murphy himself was fatally shot.
2024-04-13	Ezekiel Adell Carl Jackson (25)	Black	Pampa, Texas	Jackson was shot and killed by officers in unclear circumstances during a traffic stop.
2024-04-13	Steven Benjamin Woods (41)	Unknown	Salmon Creek, Washington	Clark County deputies fatally shot Woods, who was a suspect in a carjacking, inside of an American Legion bingo hall.
2024-04-13	Ricardo Guade Andrade (36)	Hispanic	Pasadena, California	After a car pursuit, Andrade fled into a residential neighborhood and allegedly committed several home invasions. As a K-9 approached him, Andrade reportedly brandished a handgun and was shot dead by police.
2024-04-13	Daniel Silver (43)	White	Durand, Michigan	A Michigan State Police officer shot and killed a man during a traffic stop during unknown circumstances.
2024-04-12	Christopher Leong	Asian	Folsom, California	
2024-04-12	Donovan Jelicich (32)	White	Cottonwood, Arizona	Jelicich was shot and killed by an officer after he allegedly assaulted the officer during a traffic stop.
2024-04-12	Marta Lamar Prater (49)	Latino	Balcones Heights, Texas	Prater was shot after she reportedly chased a Balcones Heights police officer with a homemade weapon.
2024-04-12	William Jae Kil Nelson (22)	White	Grand Chute, Wisconsin	Nelson was shot and killed by police when he was wielding a knife after a crash.
2024-04-12	Hussein Al-Raji (18)	Asian	Warren, Michigan	Warren Police fatally shot a man after he allegedly pointed a Semi-automatic pistol at them outside a residence. The man was the center of the domestic violence call the officers responded to.
2024-04-12	Jaylen Lobley (18)	Black	Memphis, Tennessee	Lobley died after being fatally shot by Memphis Police during a shootout in the Whitehaven Neighborhood. Memphis Police Officer Joseph McKinney was killed and two other police officers were injured. A 17-year-old who was with Lobley was shot and wounded. The Shelby County District Attorney's Office later stated McKinney had been killed by friendly fire.
2024-04-12	Joseph McKinney (26)	White	Memphis, Tennessee	Lobley died after being fatally shot by Memphis Police during a shootout in the Whitehaven Neighborhood. Memphis Police Officer Joseph McKinney was killed and two other police officers were injured. A 17-year-old who was with Lobley was shot and wounded. The Shelby County District Attorney's Office later stated McKinney had been killed by friendly fire.
2024-04-11	Randy May (65)	Unknown	Columbus, Arkansas	Hempstead County Sheriff’s deputies arrived at May's residence arrest who was the subject of a felony warrant. The deputies encountered May at the front door of his residence. At some point May allegedly charged at the deputies with a machete, and was fatally shot.
2024-04-11	Malachi Ephesian Jonah Williams (22)	Black	San Marcos, Texas	Williams was fatally shot by police as he ran towards a business while allegedly possessing two knives in his hands.
2024-04-11	Mark Benavidez	Latino	Albuquerque, New Mexico	At a Walmart supercenter, the man was fatally shot by multiple police officers after he grabbed an officer’s rifle and fired several rounds at the ground while they were attempting to detain him. Benavidez was attempting to conduct an armed robbery with another woman according to police.
2024-04-11	Martin Herrera (27)	Hispanic	El Paso, Texas	Police killed Herrera on April 11 after responding to a shots fired call that triggered a SWAT situation.
2024-04-11	Televise Sau (53)	Native Hawaiian and Pacific Islander	Maui, Hawaii	After responding to a report of a stolen vehicle, Officers located it and ordered the suspect to stop. Sau fled and was tased during a foot chase. He died a week later.
2024-04-10	Clint Lavelle Hoyhtya (28)	White	Minnetonka, Minnesota	The man was killed in a shootout with Hennepin County Sheriff deputies at a residence. Two deputies were wounded by gunfire.
2024-04-10	Jesus Huerta-Sanchez (28)	Hispanic	Tulsa, Oklahoma	Sanchez died after he was fatally shot by two Tulsa police officers after he purportedly pointed a semi-automatic pistol at them.
2024-04-10	unidentified male	Unknown	Austin, Texas	US Marshals fatally shot a man in southwest Austin who allegedly exited a blue Honda Accord with a weapon.
2024-04-10	Cameron Lee Atkins (54)	White	Sullivan, Indiana	Two Sullivan County sheriff's deputies fatally shot Atkins at his home after he allegedly pointed a firearm in their direction. The deputies were at Atkins home to discuss a protective order.
2024-04-10	Kevin Taylor II (29)	Unknown	Waynesboro, Virginia	Police received an emergency call for a shooting at Parkway Village Apartments. When they arrived, observed Taylor fleeing the scene and a pursuit began. Taylor then crashed during the pursuit which led it to an end. Taylor was shot and killed by police under unknown circumstances. A firearm was located at the scene.
2024-04-09	Rodney Osborne (43)	White	Orient, Ohio	A correctional officer and firearms instructor fatally shot Osborne, a corrections lieutenant, during a dry firing exercise. The instructor was charged with negligent homicide.
2024-04-09	Danielle Rachel Blake (23)	White	North Vernon, Indiana	Police officers from the North Vernon Police Department and Jennings County Sheriff’s Office responded to a disturbance at an apartment. Afterwards, they encounter Blake inside of a bathroom. At some point Blake allegedly brandished a "large" knife and allegedly lunged at the officers with the knife. Blake was then fatally shot by two officers from the North Vernon Police Department.
2024-04-09	Cheryl Gaines (54)	Unknown	Attica, Kansas	Gaines died after being fatally shot by a Harper County Sheriff deputy during a traffic stop. She allegedly charged at the deputy with a knife and scissors.
2024-04-09	Frank Lando Jr. (65)	White	Southampton Township, New Jersey	
2024-04-09	unidentified male	Unknown	Houston, Texas	
2024-04-08	Ashley Michelle Brown (34)	Black	Columbia, South Carolina	An officer struck and killed a driver while responding to a shooting report.
2024-04-08	Ryan Sean Oxley (43)	Unknown	Grand Prairie, Texas	Oxley was fatally shot by two Grand Prairie police officers after he allegedly pointed a firearm at them.
2024-04-08	Christopher Milakovich (50)	White	Waukesha, Wisconsin	Four Waukesha Police officer fatally shot Milakovich, who allegedly involved at an attempted theft at a CarMax. Milakovich was later found to be unarmed.
2024-04-08	unidentified male (42)	White	Saint Joseph, Michigan	St. Joseph charter township police were called to do a welfare check for the man, who was a semi- truck driver. When police arrived, the man crashed his truck into a police vehicle, before driving away and crashing into a home. The man was shot killed after he exited the truck. The reason for this is unclear.
2024-04-08	Riley Doggett (17)	White	Wyoming, Michigan	Police pursued a stolen Range Rover occupied by Doggett and another teenager. After crashing into a parked car, Doggett and the driver got out and fled on foot. A sheriff's deputy in a vehicle struck Doggett, who suffered head injuries and died on May 9. Later in May the county prosecutor announced they would not charge the deputy involved. The other teenager was charged with causing death by evading police.
2024-04-07	Stefan Sprincean (28)	White	North Charleston, South Carolina	
2024-04-06	Charles Ferree (72)	White	Shelton, Washington	
2024-04-06	Deolia Blandford (49)	White	Shelton, Washington	
2024-04-06	Jamal Wayne Wood (37)	Black	Doral, Florida	Wood got into an altercation at a bar and fatally shot a security guard who attempted to intervene. Two officers working security exchanged gunfire with Wood, killing him and wounding one officer. Six bystanders were also injured during the shootout.
2024-04-06	unidentified male	Unknown	Conway, Arkansas	A man drive a vehicle into a massage parlor at a shopping center. The man then barricaded himself inside the business. At some point, SWAT arrived and a shootout ensued and the man was killed.
2024-04-06	David Vanderhamm (39)	White	Cedar Rapids, Iowa	Police responded to a man allegedly challenging officers to a fight and making suicidal and homicidal statements whilst holding a rifle in his hand. Vanderhamm raised his rifle at one of the officers, causing them to open fire, killing Vanderham and wounding a bystander.
2024-04-05	Mauricio Sandoval (46)	Hispanic	Cerritos, California	CHP officers fatally shot a man during a shootout in the parking lot of the Los Cerritos Center in Cerritos.
2024-04-04	Bobby Dickens (44)	White	Martin, Tennessee	Dickens died after being shot by a deputy after he allegedly lunged at deputies with a sharp object.
2024-04-04	unidentified male (50s)	Unknown	Riverside, California	Riverside police shot and killed the man outside of an apartment complex after he allegedly ignored police officers commands to drop the knife he was holding The man was a suspect in a domestic violence situation.
2024-04-04	unidentified male	Unknown	Houston, Texas	An off-duty officer struck and killed a pedestrian when he was heading home.
2024-04-04	Javier Harvey Salinas Jr (27)	Hispanic	Roswell, New Mexico	When Roswell police attempted to pull over Salinas's vehicle, Salinas sped off. Salinas then crashed into a yard outside of an apartment complex. Salinas then exited the vehicle and shot at the detectives that were pursuing him. The detectives shot back Salinas. Salinas was later found deceased between two buildings. Salinas was a suspect in a March 29 fatal shooting.
2024-04-03	Jae Yong Friedman (51)	Unknown	Austin, Texas	After responding to a report of physical disturbance, officer arrived and encountered two suspects, one of them is armed. The officers recognized a threat and fatally shot the armed suspect. The armed suspect later identified as Friedman
2024-04-03	Jacob Dyer (27)	Unknown	Tucson, Arizona	
2024-04-02	Cameron Ammon Cloward (35)	White	Salt Lake City, Utah	Cloward was shot after advancing toward officers with a knife.
2024-04-02	Aaron James (17)	White	Victorville, California	James locked himself in a bathroom treating self-harm with a knife inside the home of one of his two sister's. San Bernardino sheriff's deputies entered the bathroom, and after a brief physical altercation, James was shot. Bodycam video of the shooting was released the following day.
2024-04-02	Joseph Carrico (47)	White	Lexington, Kentucky	
2024-04-01	Kevin Wayne Bayer (44)	White	Houston, Texas	
2024-04-01	Warren Burton (20)	Black	Ponchatoula, Louisiana	
2024-04-01	Zachary Andrew Athearn (30)	White	Hamilton, Montana	A Hamilton Police officer fatally shooting a man who recently robbed a convenience store. The man allegedly threatened the officer with a weapon.
2024-04-01	unidentified male (44)	Unknown	Houston, Texas	An off-duty officer struck and killed a pedestrian running across the freeway.
2024-04-01	Bart Barcelou (42)	Unknown	Florence, Alabama	Florence Police officers arrived at Barcelou's home to serve a warrant on Barcelou for rape. Barcelou was shot after he armed himself with two knives.

== See also ==
- Death in custody § United States
- Henry A. Wallace Police Crime Public Database
- List of cases of police brutality
- List of countries with annual rates and counts for killings by law enforcement officers
- List of law enforcement officers killed in the line of duty in the United States
- List of law enforcement officers convicted for an on-duty killing in the United States
- List of shootings by US immigration agents
- List of police reforms related to the George Floyd protests
- List of unarmed African Americans killed by law enforcement officers in the United States
- Lists of killings by law enforcement officers
- Police brutality in the United States
- Police misconduct § United States
- Police riot § United States
- Police use of deadly force in the United States
