= Charlotte shooting =

Charlotte shooting may refer to:

- 2019 University of North Carolina at Charlotte shooting
- 2024 Charlotte shootout
