= IFAR 22 =

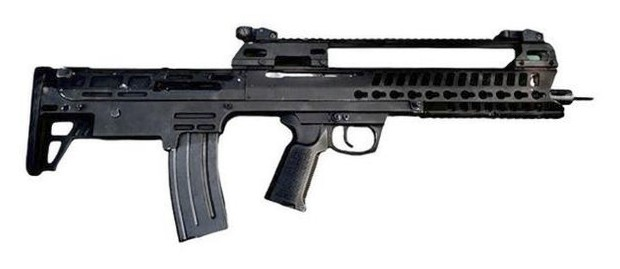
- Type: Bullpup assault rifle
- Place of origin: Indonesia

Service history
- Used by: See Users

Production history
- Designer: PT Republik Armamen Industri
- Manufacturer: PT Republik Armamen Industri
- Produced: 2023–present (disputed)
- Variants: See Variants

Specifications
- Mass: 3.6 kg (16 inch barrel); 3.7 kg (20 inch barrel)
- Length: 698 mm (16 inch barrel); 780 mm (20 inch barrel)
- Caliber: 5.56×45mm NATO
- Barrels: 16 and 20 inch barrels
- Action: Gas-operated reloading, rotating bolt
- Rate of fire: 600–800 rpm
- Effective firing range: 400 m
- Feed system: 30-rounds STANAG magazine
- Sights: Iron sights, telescopic sights can be attached

The IFAR 22 (short for "Indonesian Future Assault Rifle") is a bullpup assault rifle manufactured by PT Republik Armamen Industri, chambered in 5.56×45mm NATO. It was unveiled at the Indo Defence Expo 2022 at the Jakarta International Expo.

Development of the IFAR 22 is carried out in cooperation with the Ministry of Defense's Research and Development Agency and Pindad.

== History ==
The first examples of the IFAR 22 were sighted in 2022 at the Indo Defense 2022 exhibition in November.

The Research and Development Agency of the Ministry of Defense of the Republic of Indonesia (Balitbang Kemhan) tested this weapon to meet the needs of the Indonesian National Armed Forces on 13–16 March 2023.

After testing is complete, certification will be carried out to mass produce the IFAR 22.

== Design ==
The IFAR 22 is designed to be able to fired from the left or right shoulder with the safety/fire selector located on both sides of the rifle. The selector consists of safe, single and full auto mode.

It is a gas piston rifle that has a rate of fire at 600 to 800 rounds per minute. Tests were conducted on barrel life by firing the rifle up 4,000 rounds. The upper receiver has a picatinny and KeyMod rails for the user to install various scopes.

Some components are made from either other countries or other companies. For instance, the STANAG-based magazines are made by PT Pindad.

== Variants ==
The IFAR 22 is planned to be offered in 20-inch (508 mm) and 16-inch (406 mm) versions, with the barrels made by PT Pindad. They weigh at 3.7 and 3.6 kg.

== Users ==
=== Future ===
- Indonesia: Indonesia reportedly ordered 2,000 IFAR 22 assault rifles.

== See also ==
- Pindad SS2 – (Indonesia)
- Komodo Armament D5 – (Indonesia)
- FAMAS – (France)
- HS Produkt VHS – (Croatia)
