= Pindad SS2 =

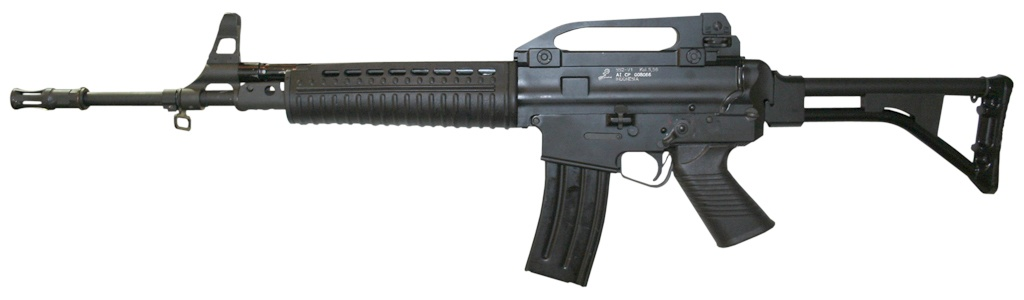
- The Pindad SS2-V1 assault rifle
- Type: Assault rifle Designated marksman rifle (SS3, SPM-1 & SPM-2); Semi-automatic rifle (Dopper)
- Place of origin: Indonesia

Service history
- In service: 2006–present
- Used by: See Users
- Wars: Insurgency in Aceh; Papua conflict Operation Madago Raya

Production history
- Manufacturer: Pindad
- Unit cost: Rp 4,911,590 (US$500, 2005)
- Produced: 2005–present
- No. built: 40,000 (Annually)
- Variants: See Variants

Specifications
- Mass: Without magazine: 3.8 kg (8.4 lb) (SS2-V2); 4.15 kg (9.1 lb) (SS2-V4); 3.35 kg (7.4 lb) (SS2-V5); 5.3 kg (12 lb) (SS3); 4.55 kg (10.0 lb) (DMR SPM-1)
- Length: SS2-V1: 990 mm (39 in) stock extended, 740 mm (29 in) folded; SS2-V2: 920 mm (36 in) stock extended, 670 mm (26 in) folded; SS2-V4: 990 mm (39 in) stock extended, 740 mm (29 in) folded; SS2-V5: 770 mm (30 in) stock extended, 520 mm (20 in) folded; SS3:1,150 mm (45 in) stock extended, 836 mm (32.9 in) stock retracted; SPM-1:1,026 mm (40.4 in) stock extended, 782 mm (30.8 in) stock folded
- Barrel length: SS2-V1 460 mm; SS2-V2 403 mm; SS2-V4 460 mm; SS2-V5 252 mm; SS2-V7 200 mm; SS3/SPM-1 500 mm
- Cartridge: 5.56×45mm NATO (SS2/SPM-1); 7.62×35 mm (SS Blackout); 7.62×51mm NATO (SS3/SPM-2/Dopper)
- Action: Gas-Operated, long stroke piston, rotating bolt
- Rate of fire: 720-760 rpm
- Effective firing range: 150-600 m (depends on variants)
- Feed system: Various STANAG magazines.
- Sights: Iron sights, but optical sights are possible with the Picatinny rail provision. Optical sight is a standard feature in SS2-V4 variant.

The SS2 (short for Senapan Serbu 2, 'Assault Rifle 2') is a replacement for the Pindad SS1 created by Pindad. It had been seen during the ASEAN Army Rifles contest by foreign media in 2006 aside from exposure by local Indonesian media.

The SS2 assault rifles are currently being brought into service with the Indonesian military and police. They will gradually replace the SS1 assault rifles which have been in service with the security forces since the 1990s.

== History ==
The SS2 was first ordered by the Indonesian military in 2002 and in 2003. It had then been announced that the rifle was launched in 2005 150 SS2-V4s were purchased in 2007. An SS2 with a solid stock, known as the SS2-V3 would have been produced by Pindad, but was rejected.

The Indonesian Army placed an order of 15,000 SS2s to replace their stock of SS1s back in 2005 with an additional order of 10,000 SS2s in 2006. Its first combat use was with Indonesian troops armed with SS2s in Aceh.

The SS2s were shown abroad in Malaysia during the Defences Services Asia Exhibition and Conference 2010.

Both Brunei and Iraq have expressed recent interest in purchasing SS2s for their militaries. Myanmar has expressed interest in purchasing SS2 rifles despite a statement from Indonesian Foreign Minister Marty Natalegawa that it was not true. Col. Jan Pieter Ate of the Indonesian Defense Ministry expressed his concerns that SS2 rifles can be used to threaten other countries and civilians while University of Indonesia security analyst Andi Widjajanto said that selling the rifles to the country can help improve relations while allowing the black market to lose its presence there.

Pindad plans to market the weapon to third world countries such as the Congo, Iran and Uganda as reported in November 2012. In April 2017, Pindad reported that some African and Middle Eastern countries expressed interest to acquire the SS2.

Brunei announced in May 2018 that plans to purchase the SS2 will finally push through after informal talks started in 2015. On June 1, 2018, Pindad announced that it had entered into a partnership with Bhukhanvala Industries to market the SS2 to Indian military and law enforcement agencies.

According to Pindad representatives in 2016, around 40,000 SS2s are made annually. SS2 has a local content between 51.31% (SS2-V5 A1) to 78.04% (SS2-V5) in 2021.

On 7 November 2022, the Deputy Commander of the Royal Cambodian Army expressed interest in the SS2 rifles. On 6 June 2024, Indonesian Government approved the military assistance to Cambodia in the form of 150 Pindad SS2-V5-A1 rifles and 20 Pindad G2 Elite pistols, with its ammunition. The military assistance was delivered and received by the Vice Commander of RCAF and Commander of the Royal Cambodian Army on 29 August 2024.

On June 4, 2023, Qatari Defense Minister Khalid bin Mohamed Al-Attiyah was gifted a SS2 V2 A1 during his visit to Indonesia. On February 1, 2025, French Defense Minister Bruno Le Maire was awarded a SS2 V2 A1 during a visit to the Indonesian Ministry of Defense.

== Development ==
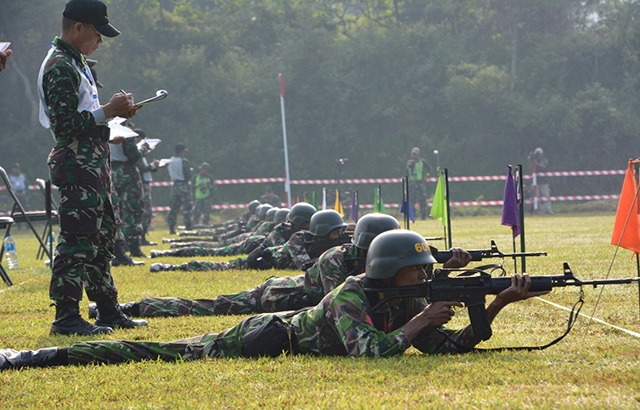
Indonesian soldiers assigned to Indonesian Army firing Pindad SS2 assault rifles during a combined arms live fire exercises

The need for improved infantry weaponry after Cold War and Indonesia's Reform Era led to the development of a new assault rifle that was lighter, more accurate, and more modular than its predecessor, the SS1. The SS2 was designed and developed by PT Pindad using a reverse engineering approach based on the licensed FN FNC platform previously used in the SS1. During development, the design team integrated features from various successful rifle systems: the accuracy and ergonomics of the M16, the durability and ruggedness of the AK-47, and the baseline design of the FN FNC.

Development began in the early 2000s and the SS2 was officially introduced in 2005 as a replacement for the SS1. Major improvements included reduced weight, enhanced accuracy, and ergonomic refinements tailored to the Indonesian Armed Forces. Although externally similar to the FN FNC, the SS2 underwent significant internal modification, particularly in the bolt carrier assembly, recoil guide system, and accessory mounting via Picatinny rails. The SS2 retained the gas piston operation with a two-lug rotating bolt, similar to the FNC and AK, but was adjusted with local manufacturing tolerances to better suit Indonesia’s tropical climate and harsh terrain.

== Design ==
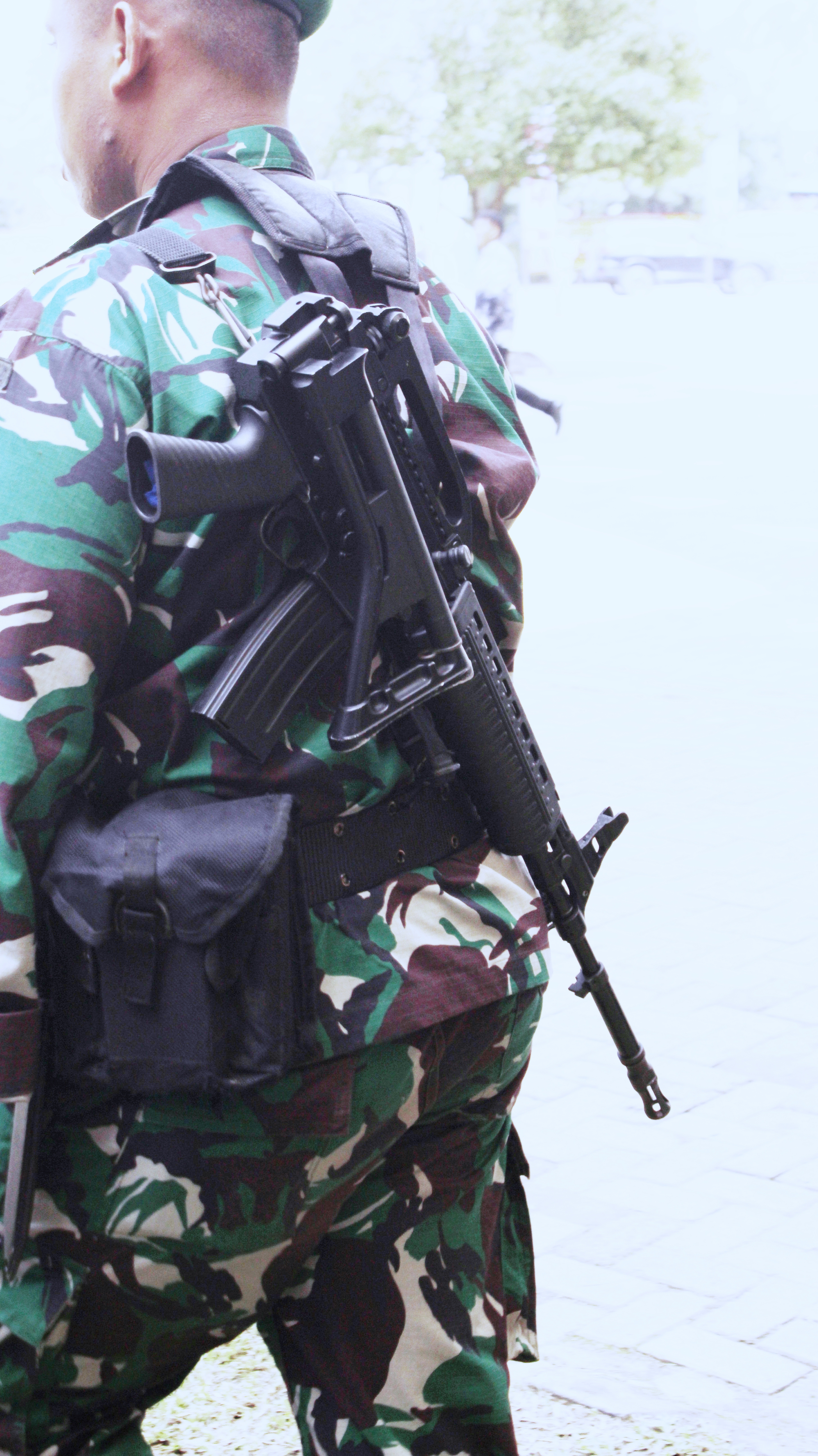
An Indonesian Army personnel armed with Pindad SS2. Note the folded buttstock.

The SS2 is an upgrade of the Pindad SS1, being a licensed version of the FN FNC. The SS2's flash suppressor is based on that of the Colt M16A2, and it has a reciprocating charging handle that can be used for forward assist, with the front sight being based on the AK rifles.

The carrying handle and detachable rear sight on top of the Picatinny rail can be removed in order to install various optics.

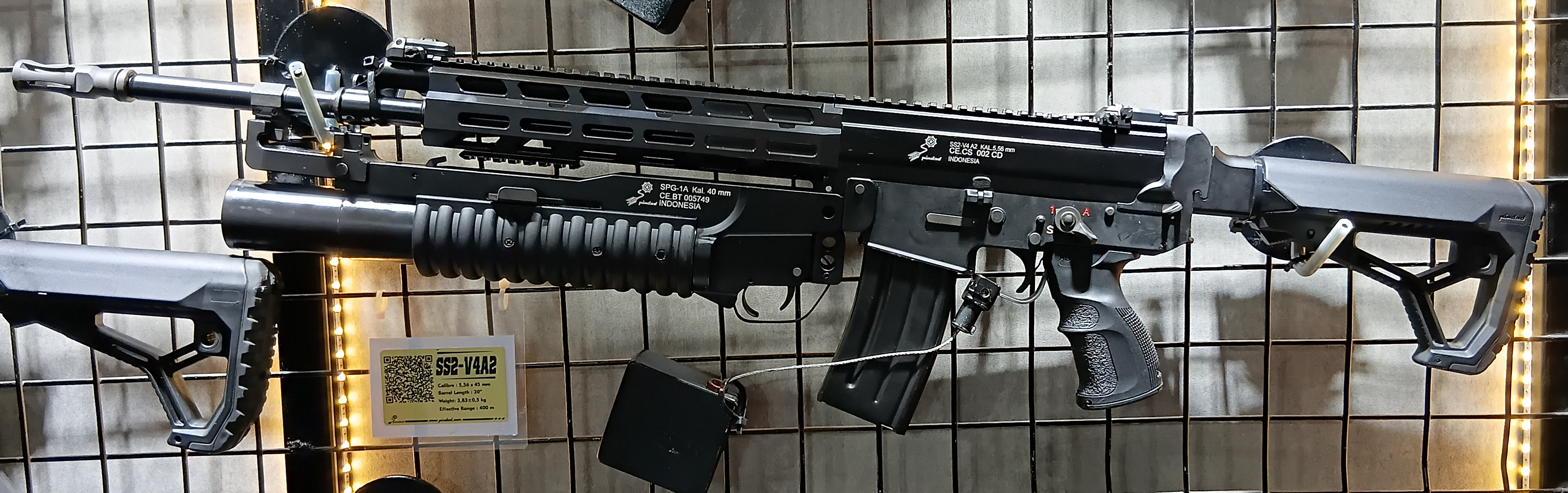
The SS2-V4A1 rifle with Pindad SPG-1A under-barrel grenade launcher

The rifle's front handguard is ribbed, with cuts for thermal ventilation. This design improves barrel cooling in situations where sustained fire is necessary. The SS2's barrels were originally produced in Germany before Pindad switched to South Korean-made barrels due to issues with an arms embargo at the time. The SS2 can be equipped with the SPG1, an under-barrel 40×46mm single shot grenade launcher patterned after the American M203.

The charging handle is on the right side of the SS2 with the fire/safety selector on the left side with provision for single and full auto fire alongside safe mode. Upper and lower receivers are made from aluminium alloy and are connected via cross pins.

== Variants ==
=== SS2-V1 ===
A new rifle based on the SS1, being replaced in the Indonesian military after tests had been conducted from 2003 to 2005. It has been adopted by Indonesian security forces in 2006. It has a carrying handle that can be replaced with a scope for scope mounting on a Picatinny rail and a side-folding stock.

==== SS2-V1HB ====
A sub-variant of the SS2-V1 with a heavy barrel.

==== SS2-V1 A1 ====
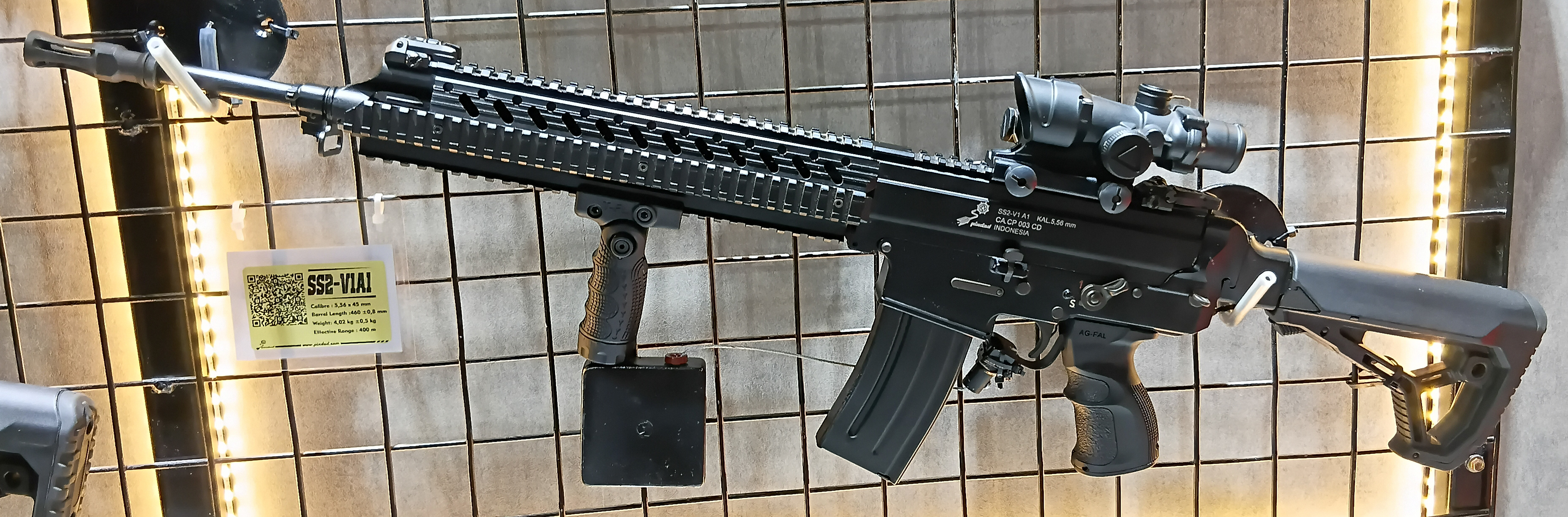
SS2-V1 A1

A sub-variant of the SS2-V1 with Picatinny rail handguard and foldable-telescoping stock (optional), frequently seen side-folding stock.

=== SS2-V2 ===
A carbine version of the SS2-V1 with a short barrel.

==== SS2-V2HB ====
A sub-variant of the SS2-V2 with a heavy barrel.

==== SS2-V2 A1 ====
A sub-variant of the SS2-V2 with new foldable-telescoping stock, new pistol grip and Picatinny rail handguard.

=== SS2-V3 ===
Instead of having the usual side-folding stock, the stock for the SS2-V3 was replaced with a fixed one for experimental purposes. The result seemed unsatisfactory with the project abandoned.

=== SS2-V4 ===
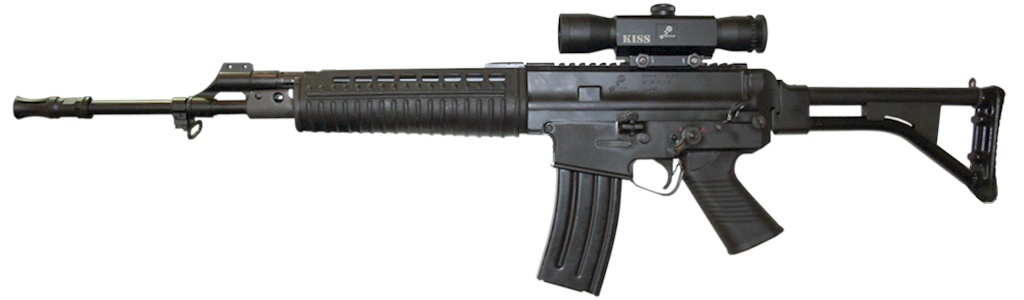
SS2-V4

Carrying handle replaced with a Picatinny rail for scope mounting as a designated marksman rifle. Said to be for the use of Indonesian special forces. The front sight has been removed and the barrel lengthened and accurised to improve accuracy.

==== SS2-V4HB ====
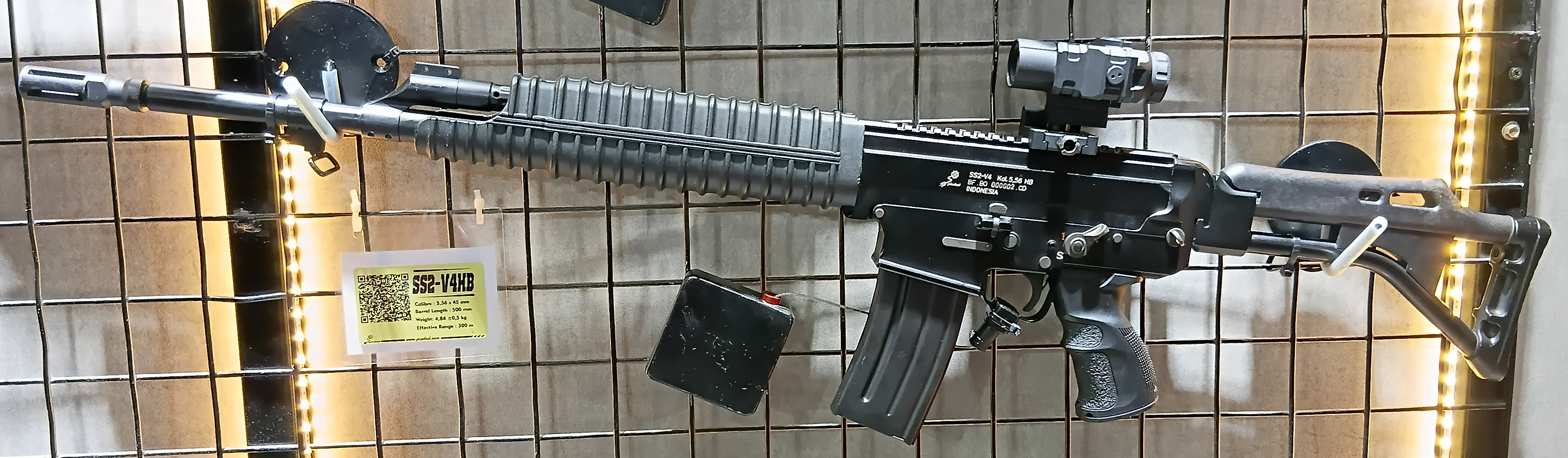
SS2-V4HB

A sub-variant of the SS2-V4 with a heavy barrel, accurate out to 600 meters.

==== SS2-V4 A1 ====
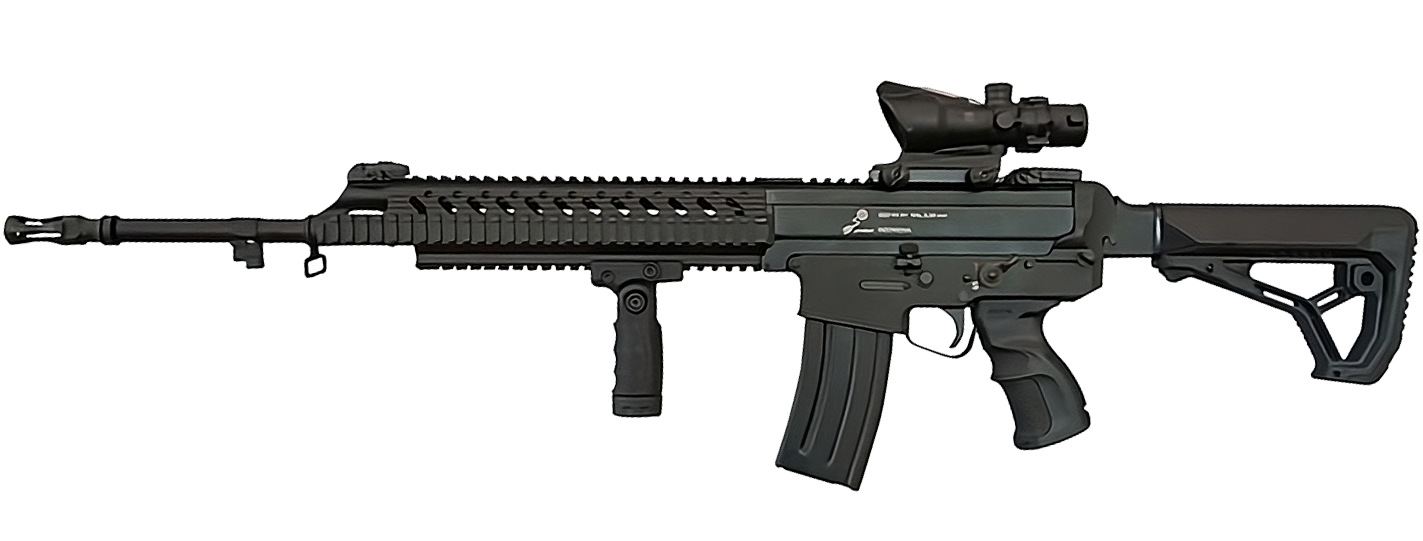
SS2-V4 A1

A sub-variant of the SS2-V4 with new foldable-telescoping stock, new pistol grip and Picatinny rail handguard.

==== SS2-V4 A2 ====
The SS2-V4 A2 has a 5.56x45 mm NATO caliber with a gas-operated and long-stroke piston working principle. With a weight without a magazine of 3.83 kg, a barrel length of 500 mm, and has a high level of accuracy. This weapon features a Picatinny Rail and M-Lok Slot for the addition of various combat accessories such as telescopes, optical sights, and other accessories. The use of a Flip-Up Sight and a folding and adjustable stock ensures optimal user mobilization and ergonomics for various combat scenarios.

=== SS2-V5 ===
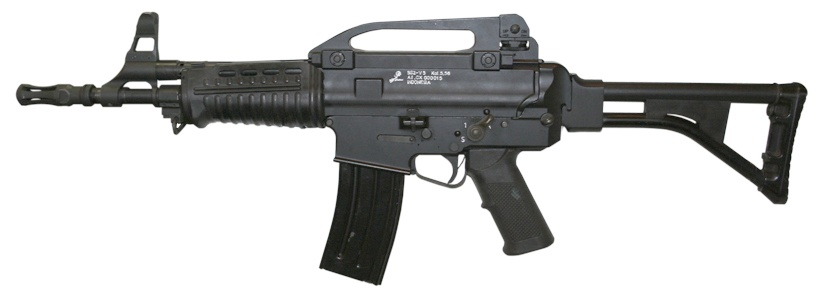
SS2-V5

A compact version of the SS2-V1. Unveiled at the Indo Defence & Aerospace exhibition in 2008.

==== SS2-V5 A1 ====
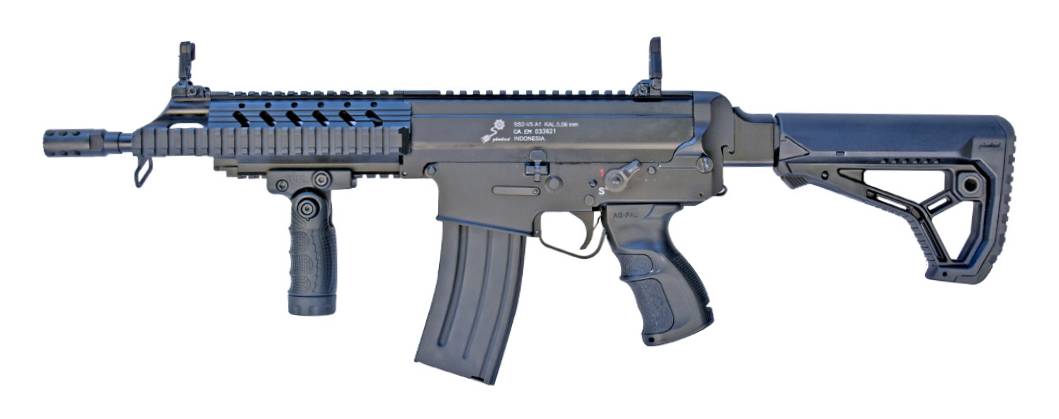
SS2-V5 A1

A sub-variant of the SS2-V5, with new picatinny rail handguard, new pistol grip and foldable-telescoping stock.

These were publicly unveiled in 2012.

These are ordered for Mobile Brigade Corps (Brimob), Army Strategic Reserve Command (Kostrad) and also for Armed Forces Reserve Component (Komcad). The Army's 411th Mechanized Infantry Battalion received 67 SS2-V5 A1s in January 2021.

==== SS2-V5 A2 ====
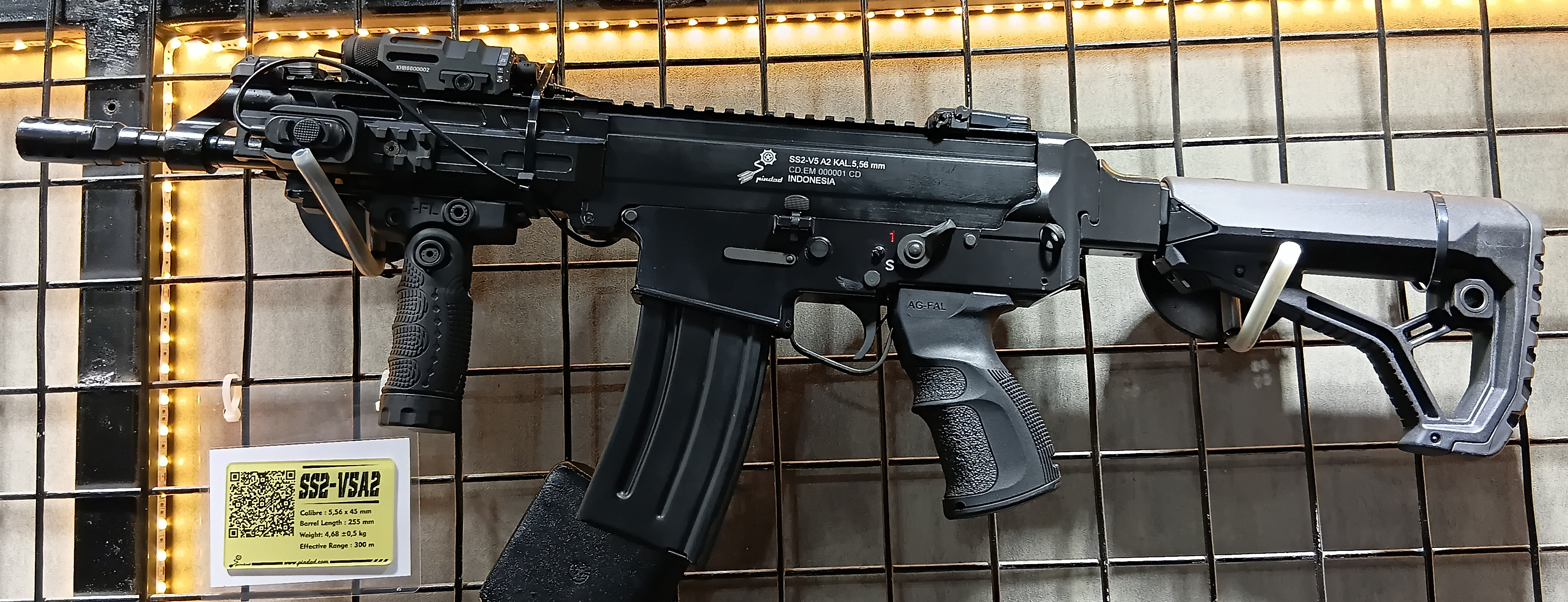
SS2-V5 A2

A sub-variant of the SS2-V5 with caliber 5.56 x 45mm, barrel length 255 mm, weight 4.68 ± 0.5 Kg, and effective range 300 m.

==== SS2-V5C ====
A sub-variant of the SS2-V5 with M4-style stock, these are ordered for Kopassus forces. These were publicly unveiled in 2012.

=== SS2-V7 ===
Launched in May 2016, the SS2-V7 is a subsonic variant intended to be used in special forces operations when stealth is required through the use of a mounted suppressor. Due to security concerns, there are no plans to market it overseas. It was officially revealed to the press in a public event sponsored by the Indonesian Ministry of Defense on June 9, 2016.

It can be used for up to 150 meters. SS2-V7 uses its own subsonic round. According to Pindad, it's much quieter than the MP7 when fired. This variant equipped with an ACOG sight in the sales package.

== Derivatives ==
=== SS Bullpup ===
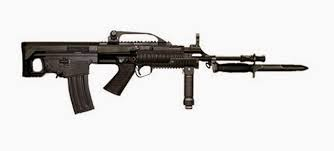
SS Bullpup, equipped with vertical handgrip and bayonet

A prototype bullpup-configured assault rifle, designed as a derivative of the SS2 series, with the goal of creating a more compact weapon without sacrificing barrel length or ballistic performance. The weapon was showcased at IndoDefence 2010, but it was never produced.

=== SS3 ===
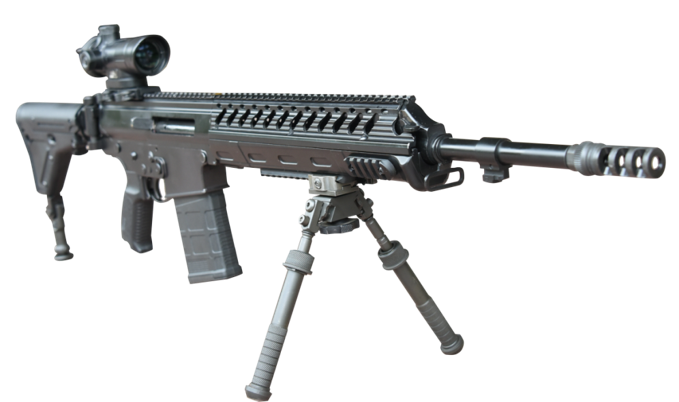
SS3

A 7.62 mm version of the in-service Pindad SS2 assault rifle. Pindad designed the SS3 as a designated marksman rifle for use in assault teams that require a high level of accuracy. The SS3 was exhibited at Indo Defence 2016.

=== SPM-1 DMR ===
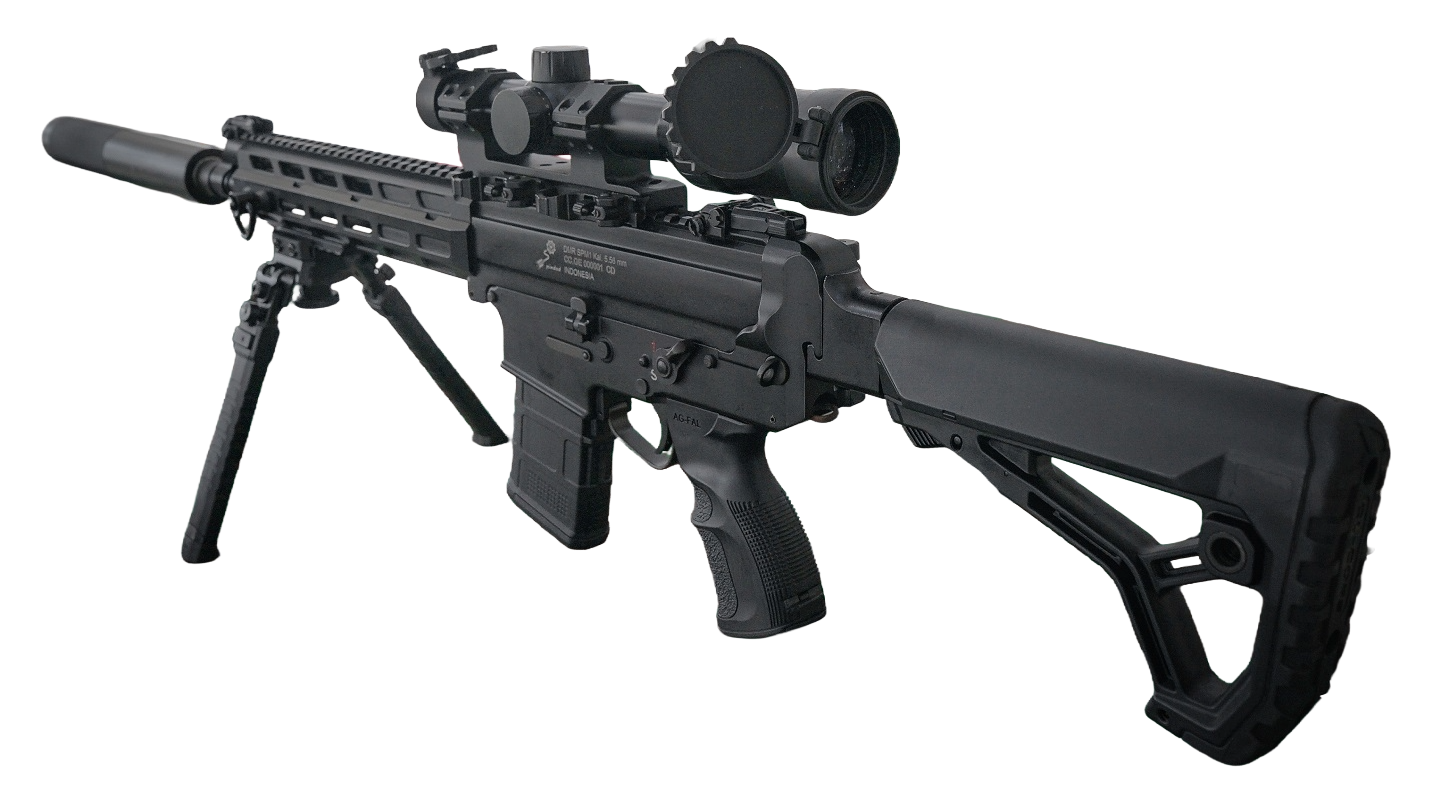
DMR SPM-1

A designated marksman rifle version, the SPM-1 (short for Indonesian: "Senapan Penembak Mahir 1") uses a gas acting system with a caliber of 5.56 x 45 mm NATO, and a barrel length of 500 mm. The DMR SPM-1 has a longer size, which is 1026 mm (stock extended) and 782 mm (stock folded). With effective range 400 m (mechanical offset) up to 600 m (with optic).

=== SPM-2 DMR ===
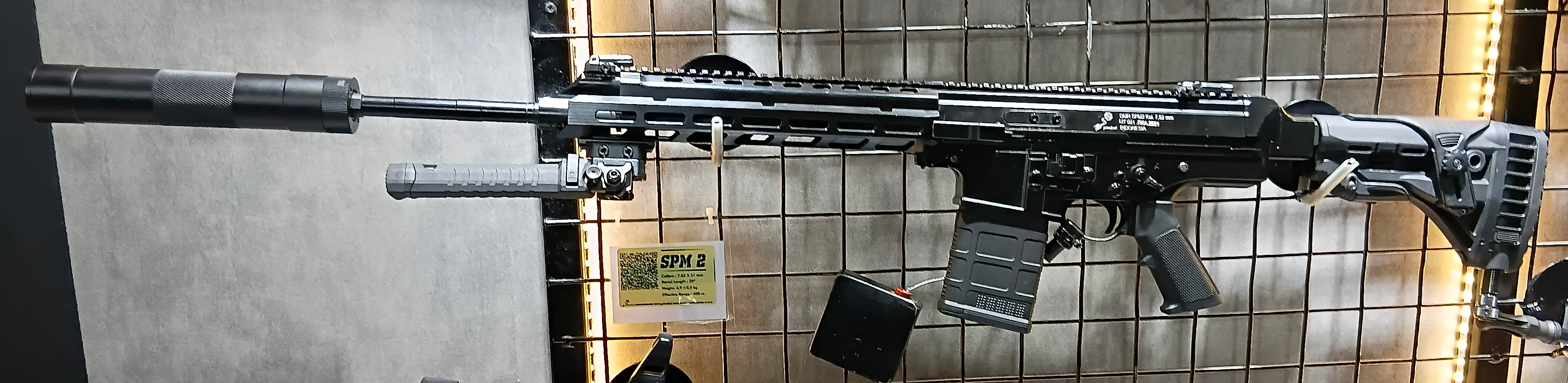
DMR SPM-2

A designated marksman rifle version, the SPM-2 (short for Indonesian: "Senapan Penembak Mahir 2") uses a gas acting system with a caliber of 7.62×51mm NATO, with 500±0.8 mm (20 inch) barrel length, maximum length 1060±0.5 mm (stock extended), minimum length 845±0.5 mm (stock folded), weight 5.3 kg (without magazine). With effective range 400 m (mechanical offset) up to 600 m (with optic).

=== SS Amphibious ===
A variant of the SS2 made for maritime operations, chambered in MU5-BA ammo. The SSA can be chambered in regular 5.56 NATO when used in non-maritime environment. Development of the SSA was based on the SS2-V4 HB. The rifle was unveiled in the Indo Defence 2022 exhibition.

The SSA was also marketed for United States civilian firearms market. The civilian variant was offered in semi-automatic only and without a stock to comply with United States foreign firearms import restrictions. It was unveiled at the SHOT Show 2024.

=== SS Blackout ===
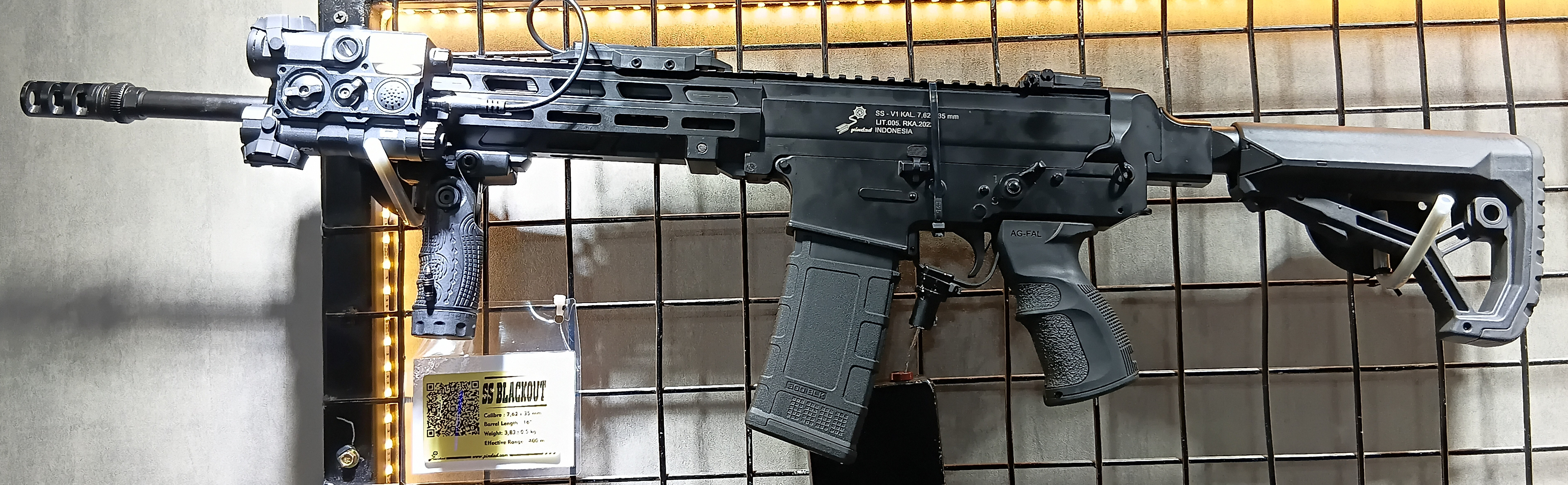
SS Blackout

A prototype compact assault rifle/carbine developed by PT Pindad. This firearm is based on the SS2 family but uses the .300 AAC Blackout (7.62×35mm) cartridge, optimized for special forces and close-quarters battle (CQB) operations.

=== Dopper Rifle ===
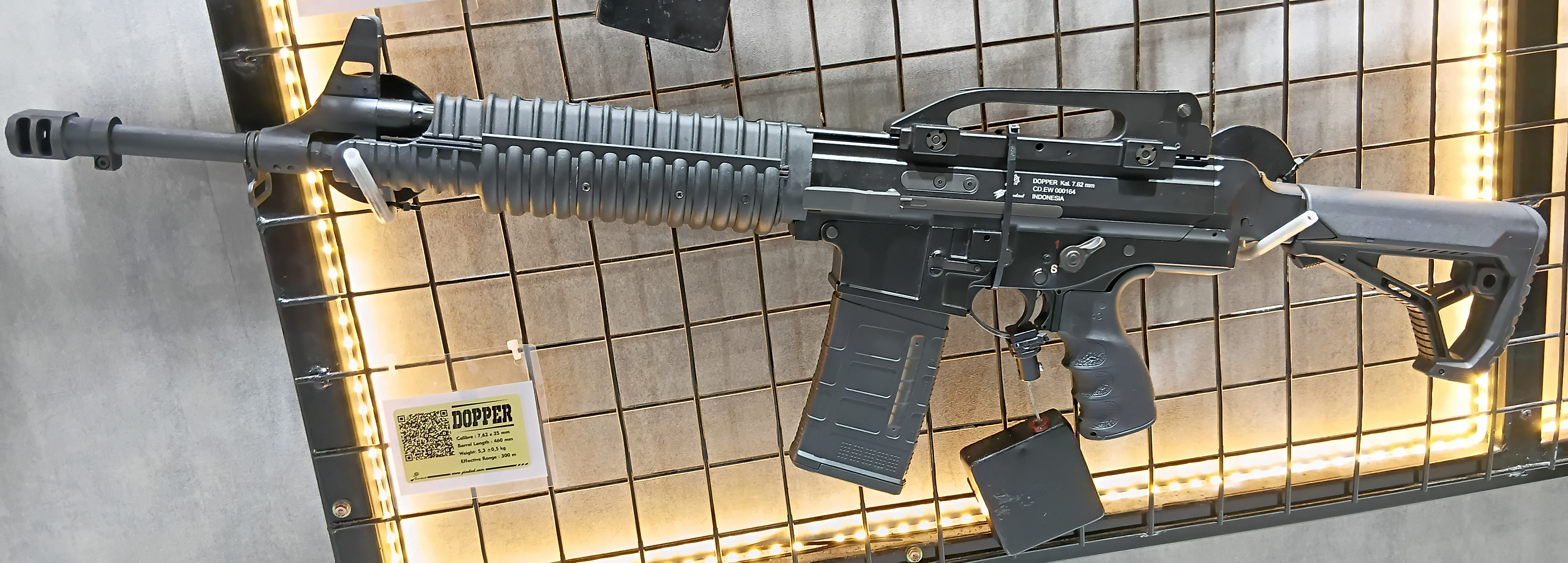
Pindad Dopper

A semi-automatic only variant of SS2 chambered in 7.62×51mm NATO for dopper training use. Dopper training consists of firing live rounds at the ground around soldiers or law enforcement operators while they crawl in a muddy environment. To avoid the projectile shattering or ricocheting when it impacts the ground, a proprietary round-nosed 7.62×51mm bullet was developed for use with the rifle. The rifle could also use regular 7.62mm bullet for combat use. The rifle weights around 4.6–5 kg, has a barrel length of 510 mm (20.1 in) and overall length of 908 mm (35.7 in).

== Users ==
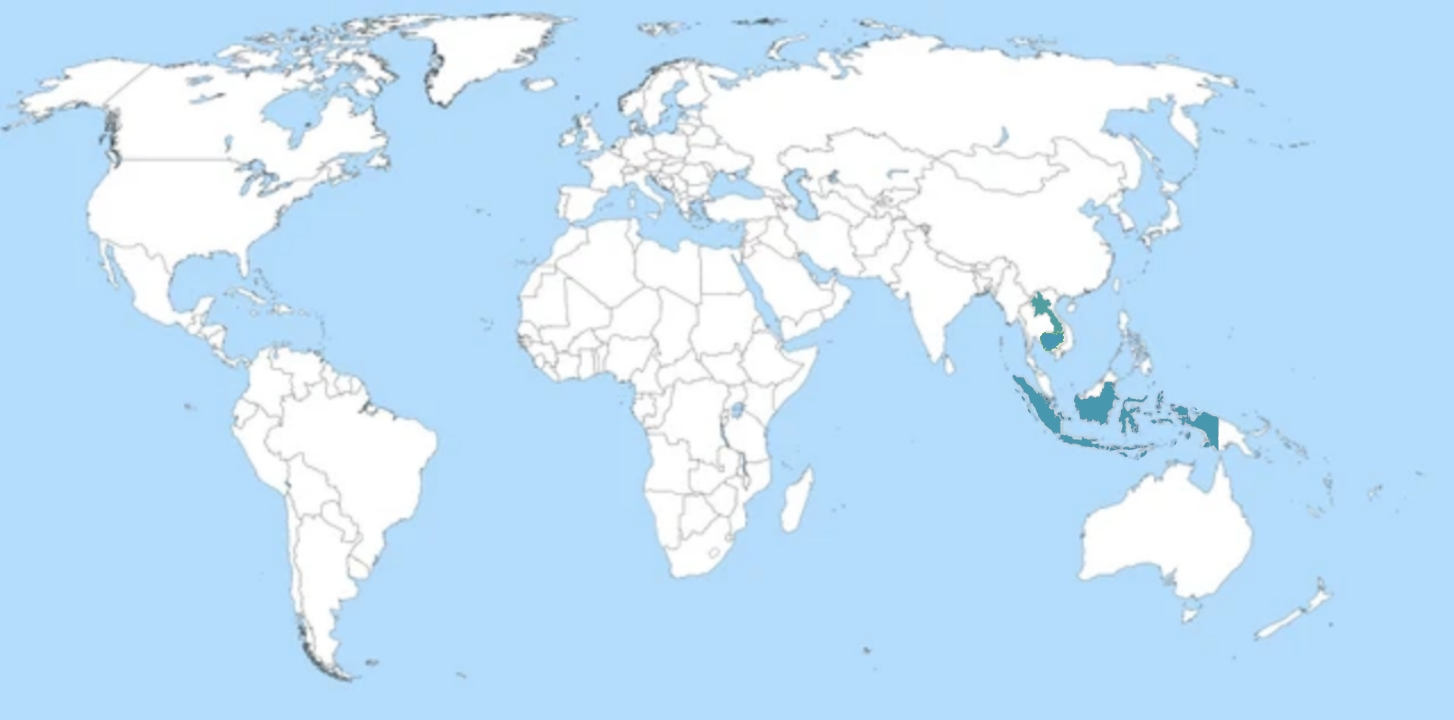
Current SS2 rifle operator countries

- Cambodia: Used by Special Forces Command of the Royal Cambodian Army.
- Indonesia: Standard issue for the Indonesian National Armed Forces. Over 25,000 SS2s have been purchased by the Indonesian Army as of 2006. Also used by the Komando Pasukan Katak (Kopaska) tactical diver group of the Indonesian Navy. Mobile Brigade Corps officers would acquire SS2-V5A1 assault rifles while Kopassus operators would be armed with SS2-V5Cs. Indonesian State Intelligence Agency ordered for 517 SS2s with the Indonesian National Police making an order for 5,000 SS2s. Additional 25,000 SS2-V5 A1 has been purchased in May 2021 for Komcad (Armed Forces Reserves Component). In 2024, Indonesian Army purchased DMR SPM-1. SS2-V4 A2 is reported to be used by the Indonesian Army.
- Laos: Used by Lao People's Armed Forces.

=== Potential users ===
- Bangladesh: Pindad reported in March 2021 that 556 SS2s will be exported.
- Brunei: Brunei has announced plans to buy SS2 assault rifles under a memorandum of understanding signed between Brunei and PT Pindad. In 2018, Brunei agreed to proceed with purchases of the SS2.
- Iraq: Iraq has some interest in obtaining SS2 rifles for its security forces with Iraqi and Indonesian officials having several meetings over possible plans on buying the rifles.
- Myanmar: Myanmar has expressed interest in acquiring SS2 rifles despite a previous statement from the Indonesian Foreign Minister that no such announcement was made public to Jakarta.
- Pakistan: In September 2016, Indonesia and Pakistan explored opportunities to offer each other defence equipment in a meeting between Wiranto and Rashad Mahmood. PT Pindad's Director of Technology and Development, Ade Bagdja would receive a Pakistani delegation led by Rear Admiral Mirza Foad Amin Baig and expressed interest in a number of weapons including the SS2.
- United Arab Emirates: To be locally produced in a joint effort with Continental Aviation Services. A Pindad-owned plant was set to be established in 2017.

=== Non-state users ===
- Free Papua Movement

=== Former users ===
- East Indonesia Mujahideen All SS2s have been seized during counter-terrorism operations.

== See also ==
- SS1
- FN FNC
- Colt AR-15 – (United States)
- AK-47 – (Soviet Union)
- Komodo Armament D5 – (Indonesia)
- IFAR 22 – (Indonesia)
- Daewoo Precision Industries K2 – (South Korea)
