= LVOA =

Semi-automatic rifle designed by War Sport Industries

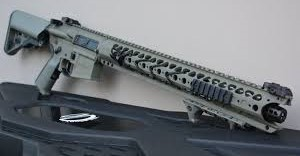
- An LVOA-C
- Place of origin: United States

Production history
- Designer: War Sport Industries
- Designed: 2010-2013
- Manufacturer: Warsport (2012-2018); ZRODelta (2020-Present)

Specifications
- Mass: 3.2 kg (7.1 lb)
- Caliber: 5.56×45mm NATO
- Barrels: .223 Wylde

The LVOA is an AR-15–style rifle designed by War Sport Industries and currently manufactured by ZRODelta. The LVOA is semi automatic, with multiple variants, such as the LVOA-S and the later LVOA-C and LVOA-SP.

== History ==
War Sport Industries developed the rifle as its option for "Low Visibility Operation / Applications for the modern warfighter", in an effort to provide a relevant response to current unconventional warfare environments and as a solution to short barreled rifles for close quarters combat. In late 2010, Warsport reached out to John Boyette from Trace Armory Group to help study the philosophy behind short barreled rifles, and how they were going to go about designing and creating a new solution to the short barreled rifle intended for close quarters combat. By 2012, Warsport had a working prototype of the LVOA rail that was intended to reduce muzzle flash and to manage the unspent gas. The rifle was shown off at SHOT Show of 2013 after Warsport had a full prototype and was released to the public that same year.

The LVOA's final testing was done by DMACK from Ranger Proof and had the same response as others who had also tested the rifle.

In 2017, Warsport changed the design of the handguard for the LVOA-C to be M-LOK

In 2018, War Sport was acquired by ZRODelta, which now maintains the LVOA weapons line. However, the design of the LVOA was slightly changed and no longer comes with some of the features and accessories it came with before such as the War Bungee cord and the B5 Systems stock.

== Specifications ==
The LVOA-C is a direct gas-impingement (DGI) operated rifle based on the Colt AR-15. It features a proprietary full-length fore-end with an integrated muzzle brake/flash suppressor, which prevents the use of a suppressor due to size constraints. The rifle is used for close-quarters combat with low visibility operation applications (LVOA). The sporting rifle has both chamber options of 5.56×45mm NATO for the carbine specification and .223 Wylde for the SBR specification.

The LVOA-C weighs 7 pounds (3.2 kg) unloaded (7.5 pounds (3.4 kg) with a 30-round magazine) and measures 35.5 inches (90 cm) in length (32.75 inches (83.2 cm) with a closed stock).
