= AR-15–style rifle =

Class of semi-automatic rifles

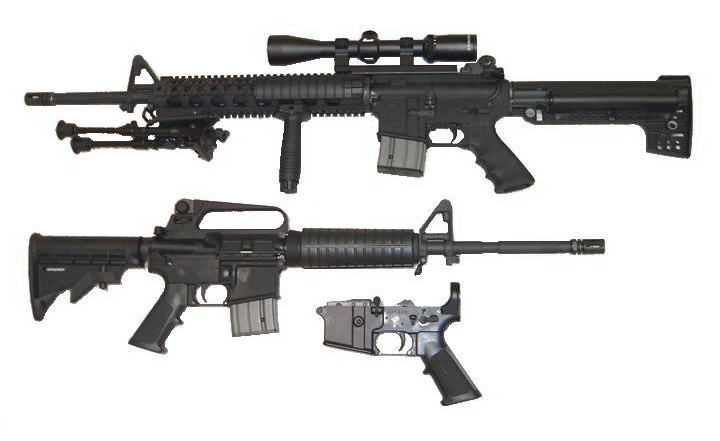
Rifles styled like the AR-15 come in many sizes and have many options, depending on the manufacturer. The lower receiver, without the receiver extension, rear takedown pin, and buttstock, is shown at bottom.

An AR-15–style rifle is a lightweight semi-automatic rifle based on or similar to the Colt AR-15 design. The Colt model removed the selective fire feature of its predecessor, the original ArmaLite AR-15, which is a scaled-down derivative of the AR-10 design (by Eugene Stoner). It is closely related to the military M16 rifle.

ArmaLite sold the patent and trademarks for both to Colt's Manufacturing Company in 1959 after the military rejected the design in favor of the M14. After most of the patents for the Colt AR-15 expired in 1977, many firearm manufacturers began to produce copies of the rifle under various names. While the patents are expired, Colt has retained the trademark to the AR-15 name and is the sole manufacturer able to label their firearms as such.

From 1994 to 2004, the Federal Assault Weapons Ban restricted the sale of the Colt AR-15 and some derivatives in the United States, although it did not affect rifles with fewer listed features.

Beginning in the 2010s, AR-15–style rifles became one of the "most beloved and most vilified rifles" in the United States, according to The New York Times; the rifles have gained infamy due in part to their use in high-profile mass shootings. Promoted as "America's rifle" by the National Rifle Association of America, their popularity is partially attributable to active restrictions, or proposals to ban or restrict them. They are emblematic as being on the frontline of the debate over U.S. gun control. As of 2024, there are over 28 million AR-15–style rifles in circulation in the United States.

== Terminology ==
Different sources attribute the letters "AR" in AR-15 to different origins in the early history of the rifle by its manufacturer, ArmaLite. According to the company's website, it stood for "ArmaLite Rifle". According to Jim Sullivan, Eugene Stoner's business partner, the letters "AR" stood for the first two letters of the company's name, while according to Stoner's daughter and son-in-law it stood for "ArmaLite Research". According to the NSSF, AR-15 is most-commonly used to refer to the civilian semi-automatic variants of the rifle which lack the fully automatic function. A common misconception is that "AR" is an abbreviation for assault rifle or automatic rifle, perhaps because of the weapon's inclusion in the Federal Assault Weapons Ban in 1994, or because the ArmaLite AR-15 was originally designed to replace the M14 rifle in the Vietnam War.

The AR-15 is closely related to the military M16 rifle and M4 carbine, which all share the same core design. Invented by infantry rifle designer Eugene Stoner in 1956 for use in the 7.62 NATO caliber ArmaLite AR-10 battle rifle, the design features a gas-operated, rotating bolt combined with an integral piston (instead of a conventional direct impingement, operating system), and was patented under U.S. patent 2,951,424. A lighter weight selective fire variant of the AR-10 was designed in 1958 for military use and designated the ArmaLite model 15, or AR-15. Due to financial problems and limitations in terms of manpower and production capacity, ArmaLite sold the AR-15 and AR-10 designs and trademarks to Colt in 1959.

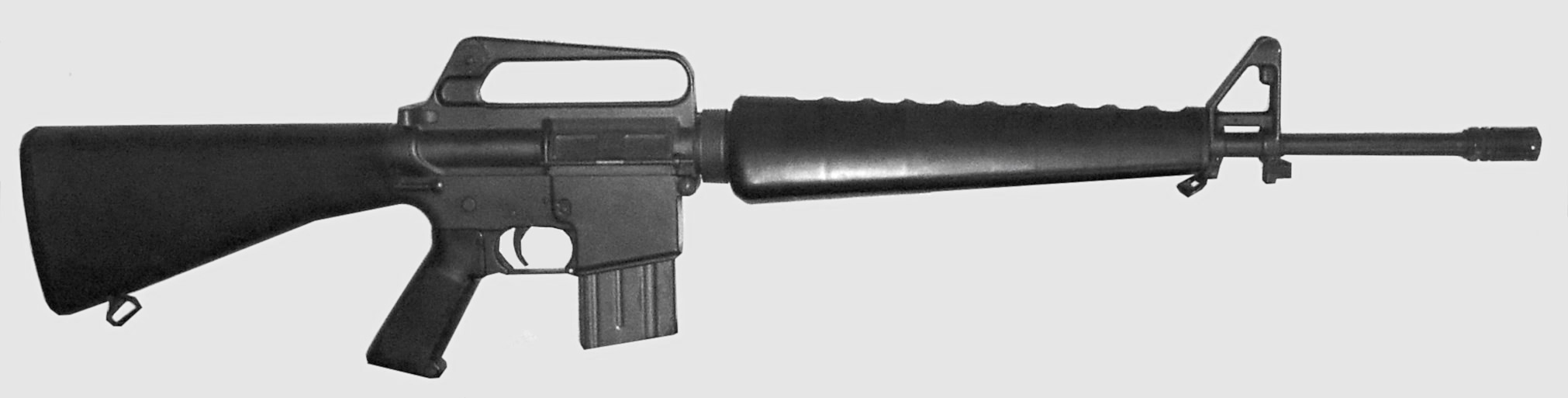
1973 Colt AR-15 SP1 rifle with 'slab side' lower receiver (lacking raised boss around magazine release button) and original Colt 20-round box magazine

In 1964, Colt began selling its own version with an improved semi-automatic design known as the Colt AR-15. After Colt's patents expired in 1977, an active marketplace emerged for other manufacturers to produce and sell their own semi-automatic AR-15–style rifles. Some versions of the AR-15 were classified as assault weapons and banned under the Federal Assault Weapons Ban in 1994 within the United States. This act expired in 2004.

In 2009, the term modern sporting rifle was coined by the National Shooting Sports Foundation for its survey that year as a marketing term used by the firearms industry to describe modular semi-automatic rifles including AR-15s. Today, nearly every major firearm manufacturer produces its own generic AR-15–style rifle. As Colt continues to own and use the AR-15 trademark for its line of AR-15 variants, other manufacturers must use their own model numbers and names to market their AR-15–style rifles for commercial sale.

Under US law, a firearm with a barrel length of less than 16 inches (41 cm) and an overall length (OAL) of less than 26 inches (66 cm), that was not made from a rifle (including through modification), is not considered to be a short-barreled rifle. As the inclusion of a buttstock constitutes intent to fire from the shoulder, and thus classifies the firearm as a rifle, many gun manufacturers offer AR-15–style pistols made to be sold stockless or with a stabilizing pistol brace. If a firearm was originally manufactured as a rifle, it cannot be converted into a pistol. However, if the firearm was originally a pistol, the resulting firearm with an attached shoulder stock is not an NFA firearm if it has a barrel of 16 in (410 mm) or more in length, and such rifle may be reconfigured as a pistol legally.

The lower receiver alone is legally defined as a firearm under United States federal law. However, the legality of this definition has been disputed in conflicting court rulings as to whether the AR-15 lower receiver matches the legal definition set forth in 27 CFR § 479.11, with some lower courts disagreeing while a 2021 case from the Eighth Circuit found otherwise.

== Modularity and customization ==
While most earlier breech-loading rifles had a single receiver housing both the trigger and reloading mechanism, an innovative feature of the AR-15 was modular construction to simplify substitution of parts and avoid need for arsenal facilities for most repairs of malfunctioning military rifles. A distinctive two-part receiver is used by both military and sporting AR-15–style rifles.

As civilian ownership of AR-15–style rifles became sufficient to create a market for improvements, numerous manufacturers began producing aftermarket parts—including parts with features not found on basic AR-15 rifles, and individuals with basic mechanical aptitude can often substitute these pieces for original equipment without needing a gunsmith. Due to the vast assortment of aftermarket parts and accessories available, AR-15–style rifles have also been referred to as "the Swiss Army knife of rifles", "Barbie Dolls for Guys", or "LEGOs for adults". These more or less interchangeable modules are a defining characteristic of AR-15–style rifles.

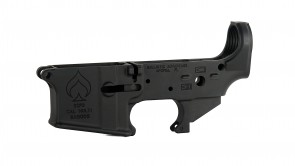
A stripped lower receiver, one that is lacking the additional parts included in a completed lower receiver, is the only part of an AR-15–style rifle that needs to be transferred through a federally licensed firearms dealer under United States federal law.

The lower receiver includes the trigger guard in front of the detachable pistol grip, and behind the magazine well. Lower receivers may be bought "stripped"—a single solid part and legally a firearm in the United States, albeit nonfunctional, with no fire control group or lower parts kit installed. End users may install their own choice of fire control group and lower parts kit. The lower receiver holds the trigger assembly including the hammer, and is the attachment point for the buttstock. The lower receiver is attached to the upper receiver by two removable pins. Disassembly for cleaning or repair of malfunctions requires disengaging these pins from the upper receiver. Releasing the rear take-down pin allows the receiver to be opened by rotation around the forward pivot pin as a hinge. Releasing the front pin as well allows the upper receiver to be separated from the lower for cleaning, maintenance or change of caliber by installation of a different upper receiver assembly.

The upper receiver contains the bolt carrier assembly and is attached to the barrel assembly. Sights may be attached to the upper receiver or the barrel assembly. A handguard usually encloses the barrel and is attached to the upper receiver, and depending on the handguard, also attached to the barrel's gas block.

=== Folding stocks ===
AR-15–style rifles may have folding or collapsible stocks which reduce the overall length of the rifle when folded, although some designs of the stock folding device may not allow the firearm to be fired until unfolded, or only fire once until unfolded. A few manufacturers have made full upper receivers, or even "bufferless" bolt carrier systems where the buffer system is wholly contained in the upper receiver, and therefore does not use the buffer tube, which allows for firing while the stock is in the folded position, or removal of the stock altogether.

=== Gas systems ===
The standard design includes a gas block and tube to vent burnt powder gas back into the bolt carrier assembly where it expands in a variable volume chamber forcing the bolt open to eject the spent cartridge case. The buffer spring in the buttstock then pushes the bolt closed after picking up a new cartridge from the magazine. This Stoner bolt and carrier piston system has the disadvantage of venting un-burned smokeless powder residue into the receiver where it may ultimately accumulate in quantities causing malfunctions. Some AR-15–style rifles use an alternative short-stroke gas piston design borrowed from the ArmaLite AR-18, where a metal rod pushes against the bolt carrier, driven by a piston located just behind the barrel gas port. This piston design keeps the rifle cleaner by not exhausting in to the receiver. Other AR-15–style rifles feature redesigned gas systems so the rifle is "over-the-beach capable", allowing it fire safely as quickly as possible after being submerged in water. The original design features a free-floating firing pin. To theoretically reduce the risk of slam-firing, the HK416 and its civilian variant MR556 feature a proprietary firing pin safety in the bolt. Such firing pin safeties may obstruct the upper from working with standard AR-15-type full height hammers located in the fire control group of the lower.

=== Left-handed users ===
Most rifles eject spent cartridges from the right side of the receiver away from right-handed shooters who place the butt against the right shoulder while sighting with the right eye and using a finger of the right hand to pull the trigger. Right-side ejection is a disadvantage for the third of the population whose left eye is dominant, and for the tenth of the population who are left handed, because holding these rifles against their left shoulder for maximum accuracy may cause the rifle to eject hot spent cases toward the chest, neck, or face of a left handed shooter. When the M16A2 was adopted by the Army in 1986, it incorporated a built-in brass deflector to keep ejected cartridges from hitting the user. Most civilian variants also copy that feature. The modular design of AR-15–style rifles has encouraged several manufacturers to offer specialized parts including leftward ejecting upper receivers and left-handed bolts/bolt carriers for converting right-handed AR-15–style rifles for left-handed use.

Ambidextrous lower receivers, magazine releases, and safety selectors have also been produced, allowing release of the magazine from the left side, closing of the bolt from the right side, and operation of the safety from the right side, respectively.

=== Calibers ===
The AR-15 is nominally chambered in .223 Remington or 5.56×45mm NATO, with the .223 Wylde chamber allowing for the safe chambering of both, but many variants have been produced in different calibers such as .22 LR (sometimes referred to as an AR-22), 7.62×39mm, 9×19mm Parabellum, 6.5mm Grendel, and shotgun calibers. Some of these firearms chambered in smaller calibers such as 9mm or .22 utilize simple blowback or delayed blowback operating principles instead of the default direct impingement/internal-piston based operating system, as insufficient gas pressure or volume is produced by the round to cycle the action, or the simpler blowback system is sufficient and may allow removal of the rear buffer tube and spring.

=== Compliance with state or local restrictions ===
Some AR-15–style rifles limit use of detachable magazines to comply with state regulations. Nearly all versions of the civilian AR-15 have a pistol grip like the military versions, but as the pistol grip is generally removable, grips and stocks that comply with various restrictions are available.

While AR-15–style rifles are banned in New York City, the FightLite SCR has been explicitly allowed, even though it accepts standard AR-15 upper receivers. The SCR lower receiver differs from the standard AR-15 lower receiver in that it uses a Monte Carlo stock instead of a pistol grip, which may allow it to be legally possessed in jurisdictions with assault weapon restrictions in place. It also uses a proprietary bolt carrier due to the angled buffer tube, and a proprietary fire control group that moves the trigger rearward.

A few manufactures offer bolt action or pump action AR-15–style rifles incapable of semi-automatic fire. These are most commonly marketed in jurisdictions where ownership of semi-automatic centerfire rifles is heavily restricted, such as in the United Kingdom and Australia.

== Comparison to military versions ==
The semi-automatic civilian AR-15 was introduced by Colt in 1963. The primary distinction between the civilian semi-automatic rifles and the military assault rifles is select fire. Military models are produced with multiple firing modes: semi-automatic fire, fully automatic fire mode and/or burst fire mode, in which the rifle fires multiple rounds in succession when the trigger is depressed a single time. Most components are interchangeable between semi-auto and select fire rifles including magazines, sights, upper receiver, barrels and accessories. The military M4 carbine typically uses a 14.5-inch (37 cm) barrel. Civilian rifles commonly have 16-inch (41 cm) or longer barrels to comply with the National Firearms Act.

To prevent a civilian semi-automatic AR-15 from being readily converted for use with the select fire components, several features were changed. Parts changed include the lower receiver, bolt carrier, hammer, trigger, disconnector, and safety/mode selector. The semi-automatic bolt carrier has a longer lightening slot to prevent the bolt's engagement with an automatic sear. Due to a decrease in mass, the buffer spring is heavier. On the select-fire version, the hammer has an extra spur which interacts with the additional auto-sear that holds it back until the bolt carrier group is fully in battery, when the automatic fire is selected. Using a portion of the select fire parts in a semi-automatic rifle will not enable a select fire option (this requires a registered part with the ATF). Lower receivers that are select-fire are identified by a pinhole above the safety/mode selection switch. As designed by Colt, the pins supporting the semi-auto trigger and hammer in the lower receiver are larger than those used in the military rifle to prevent interchangeability between semi-automatic and select-fire components. The pivot pin may also be slightly larger in diameter.

== Production and sales ==
After the 2004 expiration of the Federal Assault Weapons Ban, the firearms industry embraced the AR-15's political and cultural significance for marketing. Almost every major gunmaker produces its own version, with ~16 million Americans owning at least one.

The first version produced for commercial sale by Colt was the SP1 model AR-15 Sporter in .223 Remington, with a 20-inch (51 cm) barrel and issued with five-round magazines. Initial sales of the Colt AR-15 were slow, primarily due to its fixed sights and carry handle that made scopes difficult to mount and awkward to use. Military development of compact military AR-15 carbines encouraged production of a 16-inch (41 cm) barreled civilian SP1 carbine with a collapsible buttstock beginning in 1977. These carbines have become popular for police use in confined urban spaces, and the collapsible buttstock compensates for the additional thickness of body armor. The shorter barrel reduced bullet velocity by about five percent, and bullet energy by about 10%. The shorter barrel required moving the gas port closer to the chamber, exposing the self-loading system to higher pressures and temperatures which increased stress on moving parts like the bolt lugs and extractor. Although Colt offered a heavier 20-inch (51 cm) barrel for improved accuracy beginning in 1986, increased barrel weight may impair ergonomic balance; so shorter barrels have dominated recent rifle production.

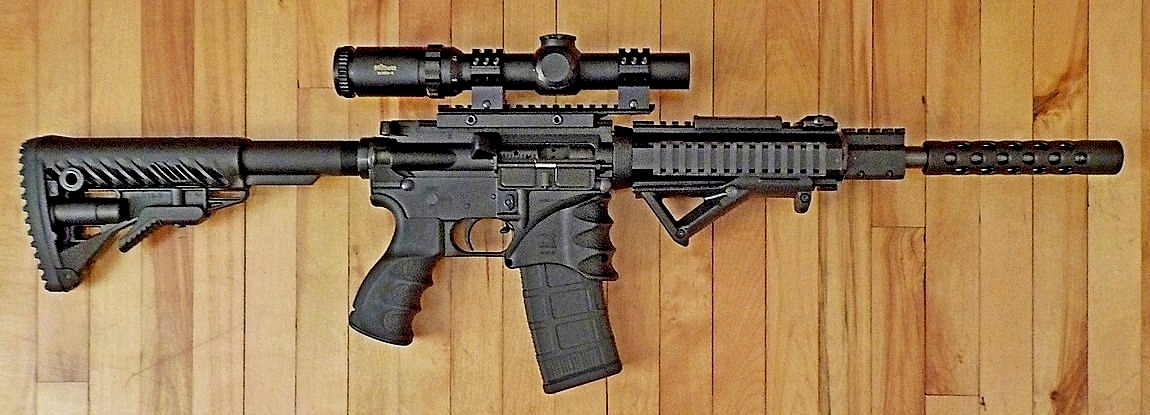
American Tactical OMNI AR-15–style rifle (lower in polymer), 5.56×45mm NATO caliber, with Millett DMS-1 scope and FAB Defense stock and grips

In the 1990s, sales of AR-15–style rifles increased dramatically, partly as a result of the introduction of the flat top upper receiver (M4 variant) which allowed scopes and sighting devices to be easily mounted as well as new features such as free floating hand guards that increased accuracy. While only a handful of companies were manufacturing these rifles in 1994, by the 21st century the number of AR-15–style rifles had more than doubled. From 2000 to 2015, the number of manufacturers of AR-15–style rifles increased from 29 to an estimated 500.

AR-15–style rifles are now available in a wide range of configurations and calibers from a large number of manufacturers. These configurations range from standard full-sizes rifles with 20-inch (51 cm) barrels, to short carbine-length models with 16-inch (41 cm) barrels, adjustable length stocks and optical sights, to long range target models with 24-inch (61 cm) barrels, bipods and high-powered scopes.

In September 2019, Colt Firearms announced it was discontinuing production of the AR-15 for the consumer market, citing "significant excess manufacturing capacity" across the industry and the company's "high-volume contracts" with military and police forces that were "absorbing all of Colt's manufacturing capacity for rifles". However, in 2020, Colt resumed production of the AR-15, following a surge in demand in the United States consumer market.

Estimates vary as to how many of the rifles are owned in the United States. The National Shooting Sports Foundation estimated in 2016 that approximately 5 million to 10 million AR-15–style rifles existed in the U.S. within the broader total of the 300 million firearms owned by Americans. According to the National Shooting Sports Foundation, there were an estimated 24.4 million AR-15s in private circulation in the United States in 2020. According to a 2021 Georgetown University poll of gun owners in the US, 24.6 million persons have an AR-15 or a comparable firearm in their possession.

== Hunting ==
Many hunters prefer using AR-15–style rifles because of their versatility, accuracy, wide variety of available features, and wide variety of calibers (see below). Collapsible stocks are convenient for hunters who pack their rifles into remote hunting locations or for length of pull adjustments to fit any sized hunter. Construction with lightweight polymers and corrosion-resistant alloys makes these rifles preferred for hunting in moist environments with less concern about rusting or warping wood stocks. Positioning of the AR-15 safety is an improvement over traditional bolt action hunting rifles. Many states require hunters to use reduced-capacity magazines. If a hunter misses with a first shot, the self-loading feature enables rapid follow-up shots against dangerous animals like feral pigs or rapidly moving animals like jackrabbits. Hunters shooting larger game animals often use upper receivers and barrels adapted for larger cartridges or heavier bullets. Several states prohibit the use of .22 caliber cartridges like the .223 Remington on large game.

== Cartridge variations ==
Since the upper and lower receivers may be swapped between rifles, forensic firearm examination of bullets and spent cartridges may reveal distinguishing marks from the barrel and upper receiver group without identifying the lower receiver for which legal records may be available. An individual may use several upper receiver groups with the same lower receiver. These upper receiver groups may have differing barrel lengths and sights and may fire different cartridges. A hunter with a single lower receiver might have one upper receiver with a .223 Remington barrel and telescopic sight for varmint hunting in the open country and another upper receiver with a .458 SOCOM barrel and iron sights for big-game hunting in brushy woodland. The dimensions of upper and lower receivers originally designed for the 5.56×45mm NATO cartridge impose an overall length limit and diameter limits when adapting modules for other cartridges included in this list of AR platform cartridges. The same magazine in the lower receiver group may hold differing numbers of different cartridges.

== Crime and mass shootings ==
=== United States ===
Most firearm-related homicides in the United States involve handguns. A 2019 Pew Research study found that 3% of US gun deaths were committed using rifles, a category which includes AR-15–style rifles. According to a 2013 analysis by Mayors Against Illegal Guns, 14 out of 93 mass shootings involved high-capacity magazines or assault weapons.

AR-15–style rifles have played a prominent role in many high-profile mass shootings in the U.S. and have come to be widely characterized as the weapon of choice for perpetrators of these crimes. AR-15 or AR-15–style rifles were the primary weapons used in four of the 10 deadliest mass shootings in modern American history: the 2012 Sandy Hook Elementary School shooting, the 2017 Las Vegas shooting, the 2017 Sutherland Springs church shooting, and the 2018 Parkland high school shooting.

The first known use of an AR-15–style rifle in a mass shooting was in 2007, during the Crandon shooting, according to Mother Jones's mass shooting database. Gun expert Dean Hazen and mass murder researcher Pete Blair claim that mass shooters' gun choices have less to do with the AR-15's specific characteristics but rather with familiarity and a copycat effect.

On July 13, 2024, at a Trump rally in Butler, Pennsylvania, Thomas Matthew Crooks used an AR-15–style rifle in an assassination attempt on then-former president Donald Trump.

=== Australia ===
Following the use of a Colt AR-15 rifle in the Port Arthur massacre, the worst single-person shooting incident in Australian history, the country enacted the National Firearms Agreement in 1996, restricting the private ownership of semi-automatic rifles, semi-automatic shotguns, and pump action shotguns. (Category D).

=== New Zealand ===
As a result of the Christchurch mosque shootings, which involved two AR-15–style rifles, during Friday Prayer on March 15, 2019, the New Zealand government enacted a law to ban semi-automatic center-fire rifles, magazines holding more than 10 rounds, and parts that can be used to assemble prohibited firearms.

=== Canada ===
After the 2020 Nova Scotia attacks, the deadliest rampage by a single person in Canadian history, Canada banned a class of firearms, including the AR-15.

== Partial list of models ==
- Barrett REC7
- Bushmaster XM-15
- CAR 816
- Carbon 15
- Haenel MK 556
- Heckler & Koch MR556
- IWI Zion-15
- IWI Arad
- Komodo Armament D5
- Taurus T4
- Kale KCR
- Dasan Machineries DSAR-15
- LVOA
- MKE MPT
- Norinco CQ
- Pindad AM1
- Radical Firearms RF-15
- Remington R5 RGP
- Ruger AR-556
- Ruger SR-556
- SIG Sauer SIG516
- SIG Sauer SIGM400
- Smith & Wesson M&P15
- Springfield Armory SAINT

== See also ==
- List of most-produced firearms
