= Remington R5 RGP =

R5 RGP
- Type: Assault rifle
- Place of origin: United States

Service history
- In service: 2010-present

Production history
- Manufacturer: Remington Arms
- Produced: 2010–c.2016

Specifications
- Mass: 3.0 kg (6.56 lb) (unloaded, w/ 10.5" barrel) 3.2 kg (6.95 lb) (unloaded, w/ 14.5" barrel)
- Length: w/ 10.5" barrel: 688 mm (27.10 in) collapsed, 768 mm (30.25 in) extended; w/ 14.5" barrel: 780 mm (30.6 in) collapsed, 860 mm (34 in) extended
- Barrel length: 270 mm (10.5 in) 370 mm (14.5 in)
- Cartridge: 5.56×45mm NATO
- Barrels: 10.5" or 14.5"
- Action: Gas piston
- Feed system: Various STANAG magazines.

R5 RGP (Remington Gas Piston) is a carbine that was designed and manufactured by Remington Arms. It is an AR-15 type rifle which uses a unique mid-length gas piston operating system in an attempt to improve the reliability of the weapon, and featured a monolithic upper, as the upper receiver and handguard were machined as a single piece.

Produced in 2011, the Remington R5 RGP also featured a unique handguard that included "Q-serts" which held screw holes that allowed Picatinny sections to be screwed into and directly interface with the handguard. This mounting system predated the use of KeyMod, founded by VLTOR in 2012, and M-LOK, founded in 2014 by Magpul Industries.

The R5 was available from Remington until some time prior to 2016. A Remington representative compared it to the expensive HK 416, and that how the R5 was double the price. It is assumed that the weapon did not sell as expected and was thus removed from offer.

== User ==
- United States

== See also ==
- Heckler & Koch HK416
- LWRC M6
- Barrett REC7
- SIG Sauer SIG516

== Further information ==
- Crane, David (18 April 2010). "Remington Military R-4 Gas Piston Carbine (GPC) Tactical AR Carbine with Proprietary Monolithic Rail System". Defense Review.
- Langston, Jay (10 September 2018). "Gun Review: Remington Defense R5 RGP 5.56mm Rifle". Tactical-Life.com.
- Remington Defense engineer (21 May 2012). Remington Defense R5 RGP - Remington Gas Piston Rifle (Television production). Firearms Guide.
