= 2021 Sunrise, Florida shootout =

Shootout in Florida, U.S.

- Location: 26.17608°N 80.28534°W; Sunrise, Florida, United States
- Date: February 2, 2021; 6:04 a.m.
- Target: Agents with the Federal Bureau of Investigation
- Attack type: Mass shooting, shootout, murder-suicide
- Weapon: "Assault-style" rifle
- Deaths: 3 (including the perpetrator)
- Injuries: 3
- Perpetrator: David Lee Huber
- Motive: Unknown

On February 2, 2021, a shootout occurred between David Lee Huber and several agents of the Federal Bureau of Investigation (FBI) at an apartment complex in Sunrise, Florida, United States. At the time, the agents were serving a warrant on Huber related to a child pornography case. Two FBI agents were fatally shot and three others were injured. Huber was later found dead after barricading himself inside the apartment. The incident was one of the deadliest in the FBI's history.

== Shootout ==
At 6:04 a.m., FBI agents investigating a child exploitation case served a federal warrant at the Water Terrace apartment complex, located in an upscale gated community in Sunrise, 11 miles (18 km) outside of Fort Lauderdale. They were seeking a computer and other evidence for the case. The agents were being backed up by officers with the Sunrise Police Department. As the agents were about to execute the warrant, the subject of their warrant, who had reportedly seen them coming through a doorbell camera, began firing at them with a rifle. Five agents were struck, two of them fatally, prompting a massive law enforcement response, including the SWAT team from the Broward County Sheriff's Office. One of the fatally wounded agents, Daniel Alfin, managed to return fire, despite being shot multiple times. The other deceased agent, Laura Schwartzenberger, was killed instantly. The gunman, who was wounded in the exchange, then barricaded himself inside the home for several hours and was later found dead from a self-inflicted gunshot wound. Witnesses calling 9-1-1 reported hearing multiple gunshots in the apartment complex.

The shootout was the most violent incident in the FBI's history since the 1986 Miami shootout that left two agents dead and five others injured, and it was also the first time an agent was fatally shot in the line of duty since 2008.

== Victims ==
Two FBI agents were killed in the shootout and three others were injured. Those killed were Special Agent Daniel Alfin, 36, and Special Agent Laura Schwartzenberger, 43. Schwartzenberger had been with the FBI since 2005, and Alfin since 2009. Both of them specialized in crimes against children. Two of the injured agents, both of whom suffered multiple gunshot wounds, were in stable condition at a hospital and eventually released, while the third did not require hospitalization and was treated at the scene.

== Perpetrator ==
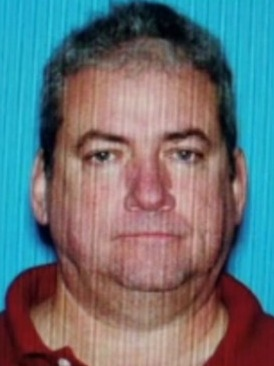
Huber's Department of Motor Vehicles photograph

The gunman, 55-year-old David Lee Huber (June 29, 1965 – February 2, 2021), was also identified as the subject in the federal warrant. The FBI and investigators said he was being investigated for possession of child sexual abuse material. A Sunrise Police spokeswoman said the department hadn't had any prior dealings with Huber, nor were they aware of any prior concern that he was armed. The department later said they had been called to his apartment three times in April 2020, twice in one day because of noise and nuisance complaints, and the third time for a "medical run". The noise incident was him setting off fireworks while shirtless, and when a neighbor complained, Huber allegedly threatened to chop his head off and made a slicing motion with his finger around his neck.

His only interactions with law enforcement were through a series of traffic tickets and an eviction in Colorado.

Huber was born and raised in Louisiana and lived in South Florida for most of his life. He had previously lived in New York, Colorado, and Atlanta for portions of his life. He married in late 2000 and had two children, but he divorced in 2016. Huber attended an unspecified college in Broward County, according to an online resume he wrote. He ran a computer troubleshooting company with his then-wife from 2004 to around 2006, then a computer consultation company from 2006 to 2011. From 2013 to 2020, he worked a series of computer-related jobs. He was also a former mortgage broker. A neighbor described Huber as an awkward, antisocial man who lived alone and with little furniture. He had been living in Pembroke Pines before the shooting.

A former coworker said Huber told him that he was suffering from bipolar disorder that he was taking medication for. The coworker also said Huber had been fired from his job as a systems analyst after ranting against President Donald Trump taking away his medical coverage during a company discussion on healthcare. Following the incident, employees were concerned about Huber returning and committing a workplace shooting in retaliation, which led to the company organizing escorts and allowing some employees to bring their firearms into the office.

== Reactions ==
President Joe Biden reacted to the shootout, saying his "heart ache[d]" for the deceased agents. FBI Director Christopher A. Wray praised the two deceased agents in a statement and also said the FBI "will be forever grateful for their bravery." The FBI Agents Association offered condolences to the injured and said the two agents' deaths were "devastating to the entire FBI community and our country."

== Subsequent events ==
The investigation led to Operation Bakis in Australia, leading to the arrests of 19 men and the rescue of 13 children in August 2023. As of November 23, 2023, at least 98 people have been arrested in the United States and Australia in connection with the investigation.

== See also ==
- 1986 FBI Miami shootout
- 2024 Charlotte shootout
