= Radical Firearms RF-15 =

RF-15
- Type: Semi-automatic rifle
- Place of origin: United States

Production history
- Manufacturer: Radical Firearms
- Produced: 2016-present

Specifications
- Mass: 6.5 lbs (unloaded)
- Barrel length: 16 inches
- Caliber: 5.56x45mm/.223 Remington; .300 AAC Blackout
- Action: Direct impingement
- Feed system: 30-round detachable STANAG magazine

The Radical Firearms RF-15 is an AR-15–style rifle assembled in Stafford, Texas, U.S. by Radical Firearms, originally released in 2016 at SHOT Show. Marketed at a competitively low price, it is considered to be a budget or entry level rifle designed for American consumers optimized for home defense or competition, usually chambered in 5.56/.223 and .300 Blackout.

The RF-15 is considered a competitor to other affordable AR-15-style platforms on the civilian market along with the Hi-Point HP-15 and the Palmetto State Armory PA-15.

== Design ==
It uses a direct impingement gas system, has a 16-inch barrel with a 1:7 inch twist, has a 15-inch free-floated handguard with M-LOK attachment points, and an adjustable stock, while the upper receiver has a Picatinny top rail.

== Users ==
- Brazil: Ceará State Civil Police

== Criminal use ==
There have been three recorded shootings involving the Radical Firearms RF-15:

- 2022 Bend, Oregon shooting: A 20-year-old gunman entered the shopping center armed with an RF-15, opened fired at a Safeway grocery store, killing two and wounded another two before committed suicide.
- 2023 Louisville bank shooting: An employee legally purchased an Radical Firearms RF-15 from a local store and opened fire during a morning staff meeting. Five bank executives killed and eight others injured before the shooter was fatally shot by responding officers.
- 2024 Charlotte shootout: A heavily armed fugitive opened fire with an RF-15 on a task force serving an arrest warrant for unlawful possession of a firearm. Four law enforcement officers killed and four others wounded before the shooter was killed by returning fire from officers during the prolonged standoff.

== Lawsuit ==
Families of victims from the Louisville bank shooting are suing River City Firearms, alleging the gun store negligently sold an RF-15 to the shooter just days before the attack. A judge denied a motion to dismiss the case in May 2025, allowing the lawsuit to proceed toward a 2027 trial date.
