= Freebore =

Portion of a gun barrel

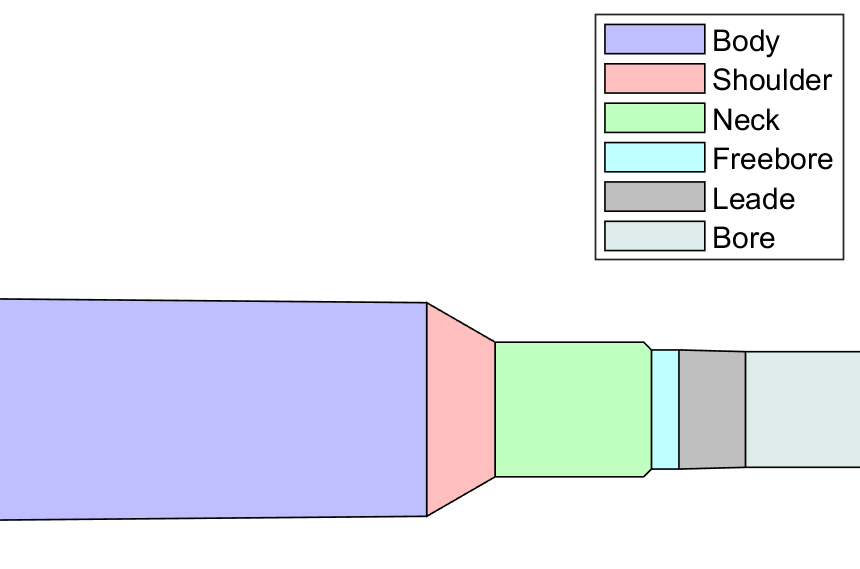
Chamber illustration indicating the various sections of a typical rifle chamber. The freebore is the cyan colored section just ahead of the neck.

In firearms, freebore (also free-bore, free bore, or throat) is the portion of the gun barrel between the chamber and the rifled section of the barrel bore. The freebore is located just forward of the chamber neck and is cylindrical in shape. The diameter of the freebore is larger than the groove diameter of the gun barrel bore so that no rifling is present and projectiles used in the firearm can accelerate through the freebore without resistance.

== Location and dimensions ==
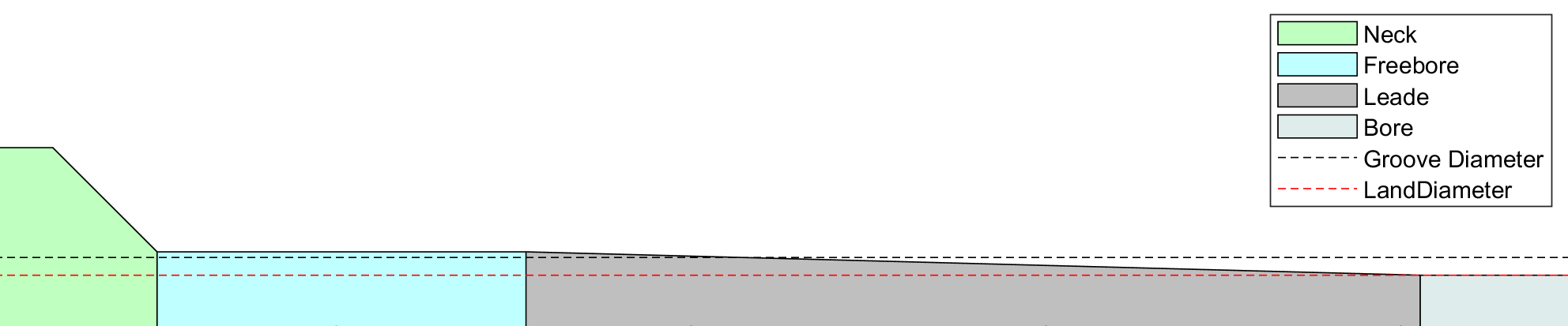
Closeup of chamber throat depicting relationship between freebore diameter, rifling groove diameter, and land diameter.

The chamber is the rearmost portion of a firearm barrel that has been formed to accept a specific handgun/rifle cartridge or shotgun shell. For firearms having a rifled barrel, the bullet typically extends forward from the leading edge of the cartridge case. The portion of the barrel forward of the chamber that provides clearance for the loaded bullet of a cartridge is known as the throat. The throat is composed of both a freebore and a leade. The freebore is slightly larger in diameter than the rifling grooves in order to allow the cartridge to be loaded into the chamber without resistance, as well as to increase the distance the bullet can move before it engages the rifling in the bore. The leade is the tapered section of the throat that transitions in diameter from the freebore to the rifling lands at a shallow angle, typically between 1° and 3° degrees.

Freebore length affects the distance the bullet will jump before engaging the rifling when the weapon is fired. Greater freebore length permits bullets to extend further out of the cartridge case to increase space for propellant within the case. Increasing freebore length in order to increase bullet jump is used to delay the onset of resistance from friction and deformation that results when the bullet engages the rifling. Dimensions of freebore length and diameter may gradually increase as hot gas wears the interior barrel surface each time the weapon is fired.

== See also ==
- Glossary of firearms terms
- Fluting (firearms)
- Squeeze bore
