= 2024 Charlotte shootout =

Shootout in North Carolina, U.S.

- Location: 5525 Galway Drive, Charlotte, North Carolina, U.S.
- Date: April 29, 2024; 1:33 – 1:50 p.m. (EDT)
- Target: Charlotte-Mecklenburg Police and United States Marshal officers
- Attack type: Mass shooting, mass murder, shootout, resisting arrest
- Weapons: Radical Firearms RF-15 AR-15–style rifle; Sig Sauer .40-caliber handgun (unused)
- Deaths: 5 (including the perpetrator)
- Injuries: 5 (4 by gunfire)
- Perpetrator: Terry Clark Hughes Jr.
- Motive: Attempted evasion of arrest

On April 29, 2024, multiple police officers were involved in a shootout in Charlotte, North Carolina, United States while serving active felony warrants on 39-year-old Terry Clark Hughes Jr., resulting in the deaths of three members of a U.S. Marshal task force and one local police officer. Police allege that Hughes initiated the event by firing on the officers as they approached his residence. After the police began returning fire, additional gunfire came from inside the residence, which officers say may have come from Hughes firing more shots while down before succumbing at the scene.

== Events ==
At approximately 1:33 p.m. EDT (UTC−04:00), a U.S. Marshals Service task force consisting of 18 people from several departments, arrived at 5525 Galway Drive to serve a warrant on Hughes. When the task force arrived in their vehicles, Hughes was standing in the doorway of his house's side door. He ran back in the house upon seeing the police vehicles. Several officers surrounded the house and announced their presence through a loudspeaker. They also commanded Hughes to leave the house.

Hughes ordered his daughter and girlfriend, who were in the house with him, to get down. He set up position at an upstairs bathroom window located at the rear of the house. He began opening fire on the officers surrounding the house. He then moved to a window at the east bedroom of the house and fired more rounds. He would alternate between the two windows, giving the officers the impression that there were multiple shooters. During this gunfire, Hughes killed two officers and wounded one on the side and backyard of the house. After Hughes opened fire on the officers with the rifle, officers called for backup and reported downed officers. A group of officers tried to reach the backyard to save the three downed officers. At 1:46 p.m., the group reached a tree in the backyard where one of the downed officers was located. Hughes noticed the team and fired additional rounds at them. He shot and killed two officers and wounded three. At 1:50 p.m., Hughes jumped out of a front 2nd story window and landed on the front lawn. Officers noticed Hughes' rifle and ordered him to drop the weapon. After not complying, several officers shot Hughes to death. Hughes was declared down at 1:50:28 p.m.

A few seconds later, an officer thought he saw movement and fired at a window of the house. This action caused several officers to shoot at the house as they began rescuing the downed officers. An armored vehicle arrived minutes later to assist in the operation and destroyed parts of the house. By 4:56 p.m., the house was cleared and Hughes' girlfriend and daughter were removed from the scene.

Hughes and three members of the task force died on the scene, and one Charlotte-Mecklenburg Police Department (CMPD) officer later died from his injuries. Four more law enforcement officers were injured.

After the attack, police recovered a .40-caliber handgun and an AR-15–style rifle. Ammunition was also found for both weapons, including two 30-round magazines in the suspect's pocket. An investigation revealed Hughes fired 29 rounds from his rifle and never fired his handgun throughout the shootout. It was also determined that 23 officers fired at Hughes. Thirteen officers fired 227 rounds from their rifles while 10 officers fired 113 rounds from their handguns. In total, 340 rounds were fired by the officers during the incident. An autopsy also confirmed Hughes was shot 10 times.

== Perpetrator ==
Terry Clark Hughes Jr. was born in Danville, Virginia and was raised in Roxboro, North Carolina. He was wanted on multiple warrants, including for possession of a firearm by a convicted felon in Lincolnton. Hughes had a criminal record dating back as early as his conviction of a Person County robbery in September 2009 and was once previously arrested for reckless driving and speeding as the result of a high-speed pursuit that ended with a crash on I-40/85 near Haw River in June 2012. At first, police believed there were two shooters, but on April 30, CMPD chief Johnny Jennings announced police were not seeking additional suspects. On May 31, police officially confirmed that Hughes was the only shooter.

Following the shootout, police initiated negotiations with the individuals inside the house. Two women came outside afterward and were taken in by police for questioning. Jennings said both suspects are cooperating with police, but no charges were filed.

== Law enforcement fatalities ==
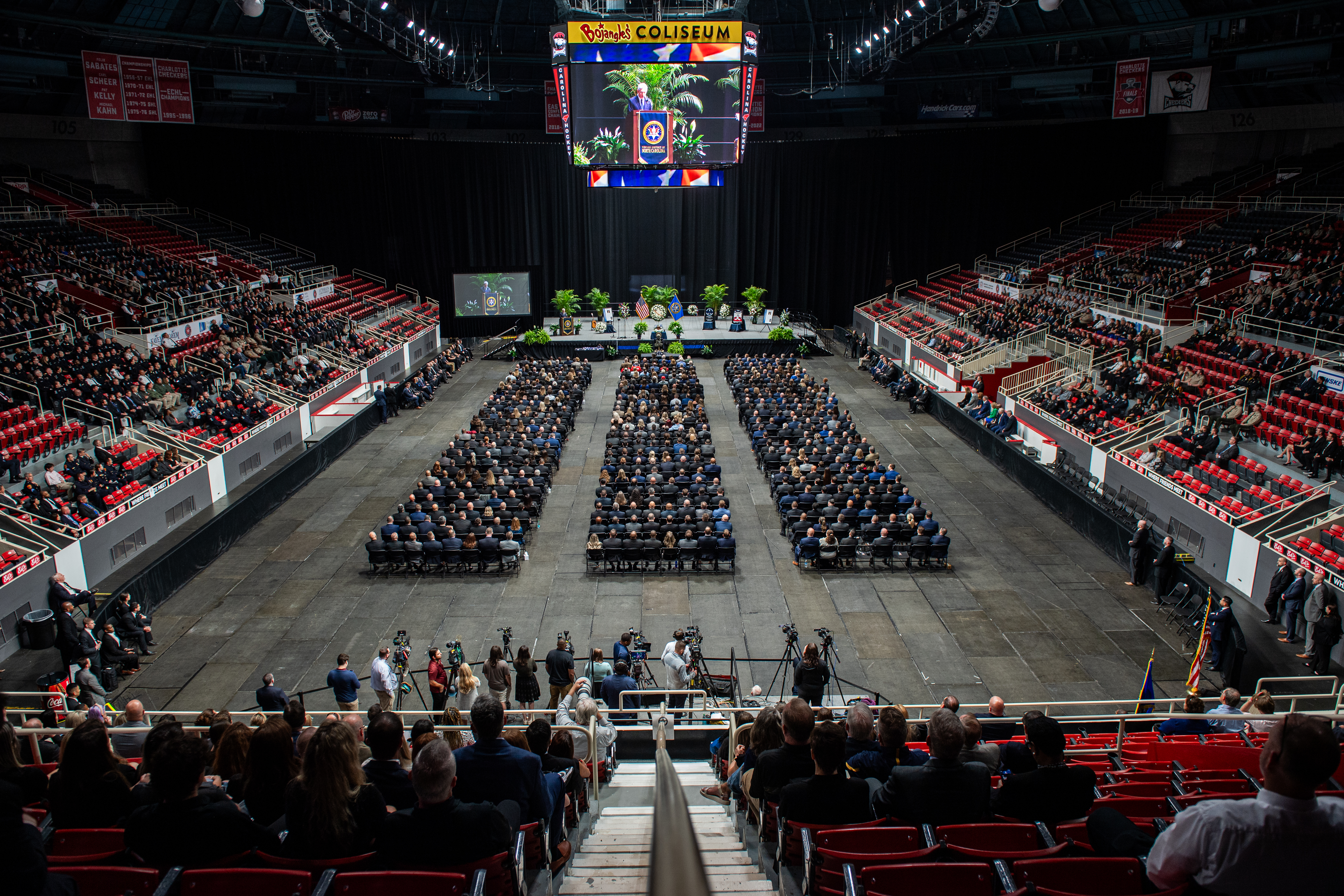
A memorial service for Thomas Weeks, one of the four law enforcement officers killed, was held at Bojangles Coliseum

The victims included a deputy U.S. marshal, two officers with the North Carolina Department of Adult Correction, and one CMPD officer. Four others were wounded as a result of the shootout. Sam Poloche, William "Alden" Elliot, and Thomas Weeks Jr. died at the scene, and Joshua Eyer was initially in critical condition but died in the hospital several hours later.

Three of the wounded officers were CMPD officers and the fourth was a Statesville Police Department officer. Another CMPD officer was not shot but broke his foot during the shootout.

== See also ==
- List of mass shootings in the United States in 2024
- North Hollywood shootout
- 1986 FBI Miami shootout
- 2009 shootings of Oakland police officers
- 2009 shooting of Pittsburgh police officers
- 2021 Sunrise, Florida shootout
- 2024 Burnsville shooting
