= .223 Wylde chamber =

Hybrid rifle chamber design

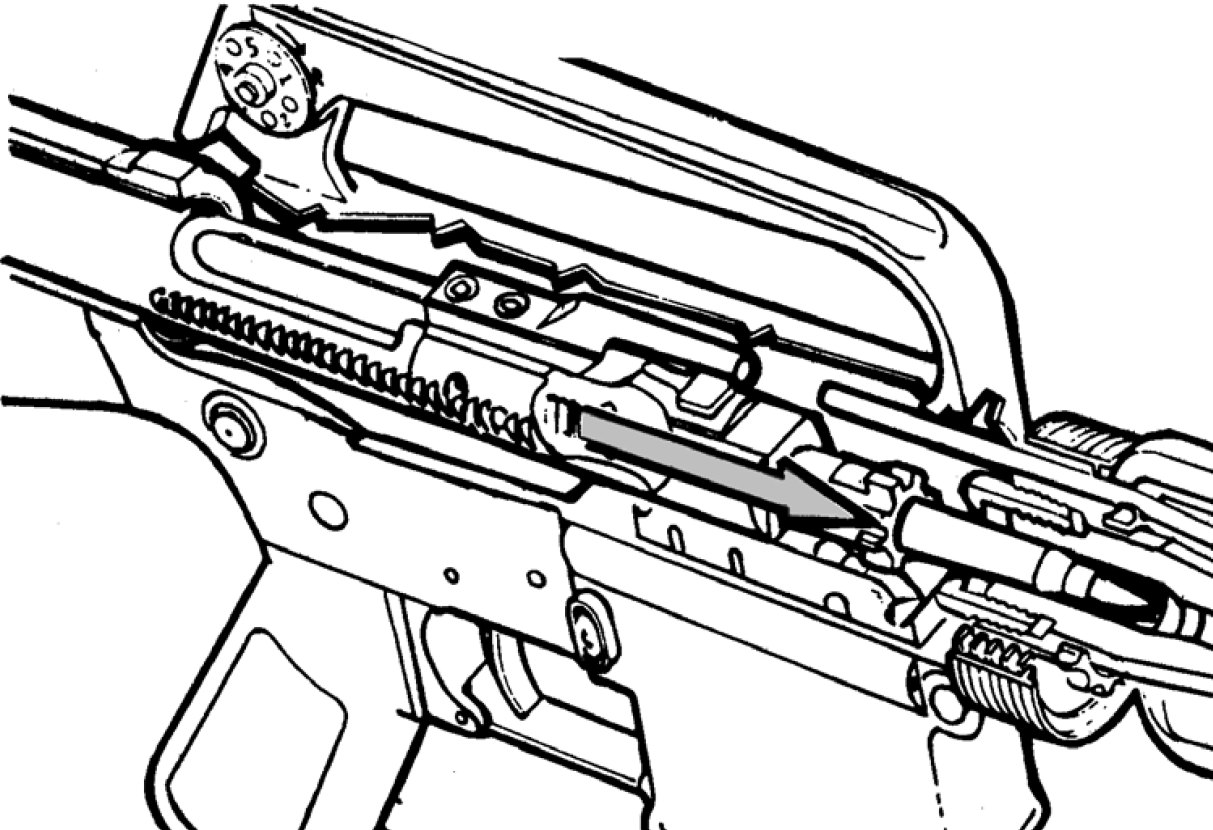
Diagram of an AR type rifle showing the location of the chamber

A .223 Wylde chamber is a wildcat rifle chamber designed to accurize the 5.56×45mm NATO chamber for NRA High Power competition.

== Background ==
In 1957, during research into the development of a military .22 caliber rifle, the .222 Remington Special was created by a joint effort of Fairchild Industries, Remington Arms, and U.S. Continental Army Command. Based on the .222 Remington, and with several other .222 caliber cartridges under development for civilian rifles at the same time, the .222 Remington Special was renamed .223 Remington. In 1963 it was adopted as the standard intermediate cartridge for the United States Army, as the M193 Cartridge.

In 1972, Fabrique Nationale (FN) created a new type of service ammunition for NATO. 5.56×45mm NATO was based on the .223 Remington cartridge being used by the U.S. Army but had greater range and effectiveness. The first iteration of this ammunition was designated SS109 in NATO countries, and later adopted in the U.S. as the M855.

== Chamber dimensions ==
Bill Wylde of Greenup, Illinois, compared the two cartridges and changed the chamber of the rifle's barrel to a specification he called the .223 Wylde chamber. The chamber is made with the freebore length and leade angle found in the military 5.56×45mm NATO cartridge and the 0.2240 in (5.69 mm) freebore diameter found in the civilian SAAMI.

Chamber reamer dimensions
| Name | Freebore diameter | Freebore length | Throat (leade) angle |
|---|---|---|---|
| PTG 223 Rem | 0.2240 in (5.69 mm) | 0.0250 in (0.64 mm) | 3.1° |
| JGS 223 Wylde | 0.2240 in (5.69 mm) | 0.0619 in (1.57 mm) | 1.25° |
| JGS 5.56 Nato | 0.2265 in (5.75 mm) | 0.0566 in (1.44 mm) | 1.2° |

=== Similar designs ===
- PTG 223 Rem Match is essentially the same concept. It uses a freebore diameter of 0.2240 in (5.69 mm), throat angle of 1.5° and freebore length of 0.0680 in (1.73 mm).
- JGS 5.56 Compass Lake uses a freebore with a 223-style length (0.250 in (6.4 mm)) and diameter (0.2240 in (5.69 mm)) but with a 5.56-like angle (1.5°).
- 5.56mm Noveske Match Mod 0 is intended for a similar use. Dimensions are unavailable.

== Use ==
The .223 Wylde chamber is used by rifle manufacturers who sell "National Match" configuration AR-15 rifles, barrels and upper receivers.

== See also ==
- 5 mm caliber
- Southern Cross Small Arms Taipan
