= Komodo Armament D5 =

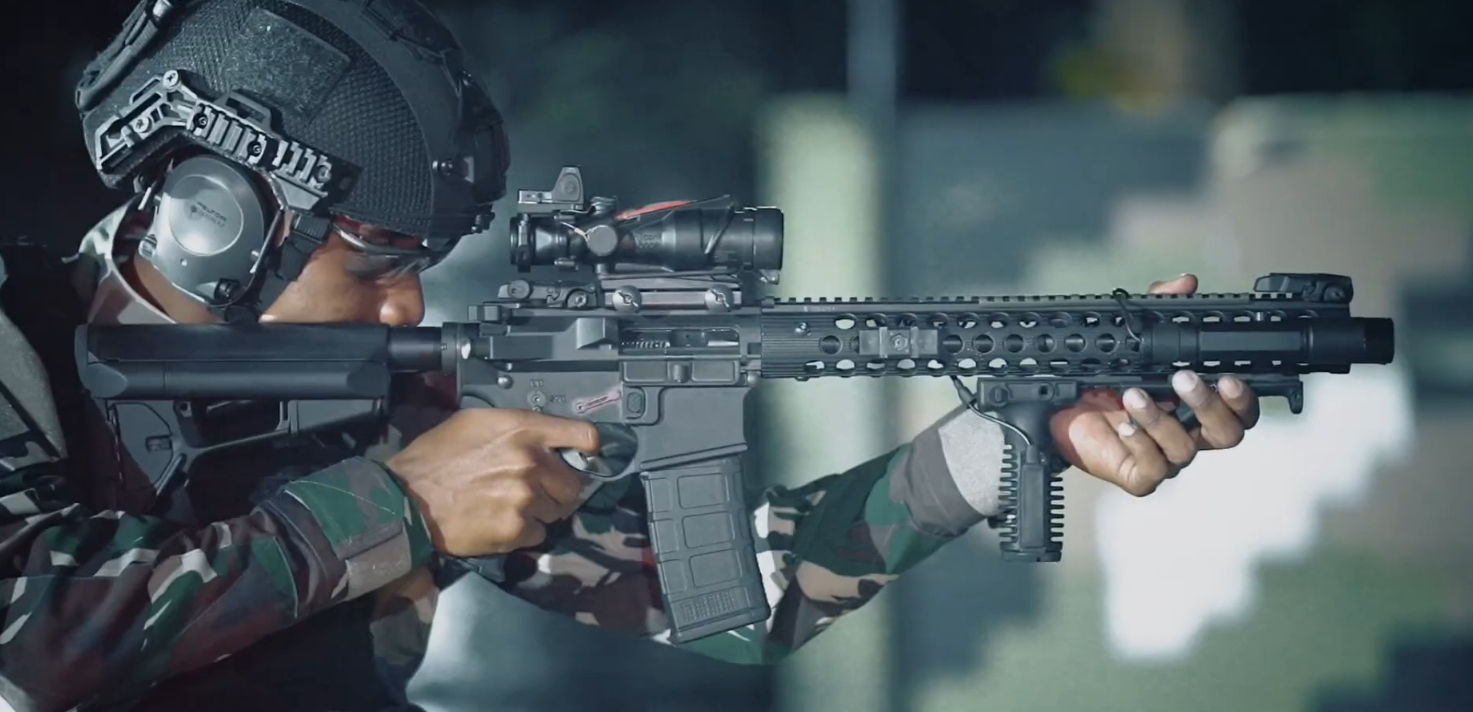
- D5 assault rifle equipped with Magpul ACS Carbine Stock, Magpul PMAG 30 AR/M4 GEN M3 and Troy Alpha BattleRail; with Trijicon ACOG 4x32 attached
- Type: Assault rifle
- Place of origin: Indonesia

Production history
- Designer: Komodo Armament
- Manufacturer: Komodo Armament
- Produced: 2014 (?)–present

Specifications
- Mass: 1.5 kg empty (D5 polymer); 3.4 kg empty (D5 standard)
- Length: 840 mm (With buttstock extended), 770 mm (With buttstock retracted)
- Barrel length: Short barrel 10.5 in (270 mm); Medium barrel 12.5 in (320 mm); Long barrel 14.5 in (370 mm)
- Cartridge: 5.56×45mm NATO
- Caliber: 5.56mm
- Action: Auto or semi auto, gas-operated, direct gas impingement. Piston-driven model is available
- Rate of fire: 700 rpm
- Muzzle velocity: 900 m/s
- Effective firing range: 400 m
- Feed system: 30 round polymer magazine
- Sights: Iron sights, but optical sights are possible with the picatinny rail provision.

The Komodo Armament D5 is an assault rifle produced by PT Komodo Armament Indonesia, chambered in 5.56×45mm NATO intermediate cartridge.

== Design ==
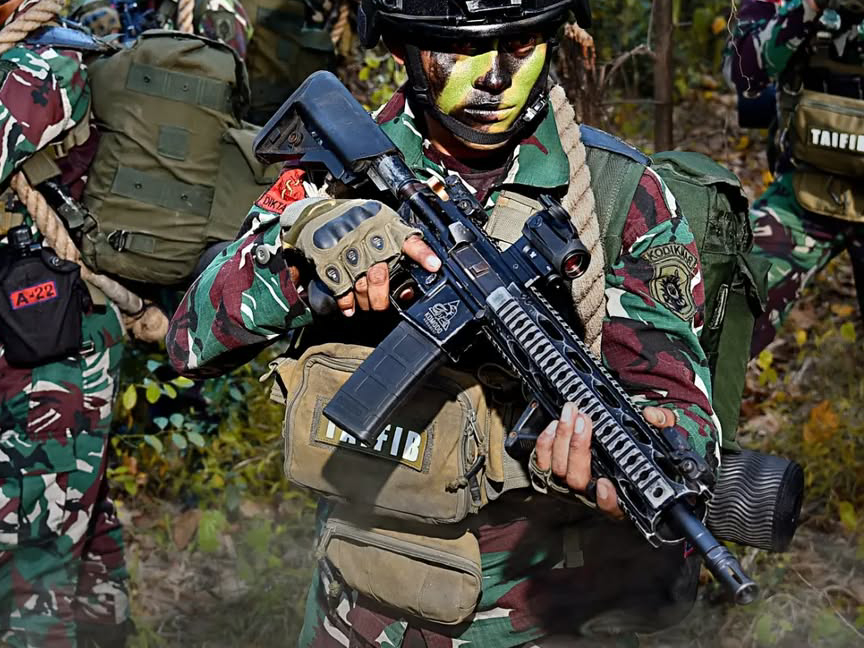
A student of the Indonesian Marine Reconnaissance School with Komodo Armament D5, equipped with sights.

Like other Komodo Armament rifles, the D5 assault rifle is manufactured using polymer material, with cerakote or hard anodized finish. It has 4 picatinny rails at 9, 12, 3, and 6 o'clock positions.

The barrel cover (hand guard) is a rail integration system (RIS) with several open cavities, making the heat dissipation process on the barrel faster when in full automatic firing mode. The barrel cover model is also designed to be lightweight but rigid. For the buttstock, the D5 adopts telescopic buttstock type of polymer material that can be adjusted. Polymer material is also used in the magazine, which contains 30 rounds. Local content for this weapon has reached 80%.

The barrel life is up to 6,000 rounds.

What is currently imported is the material for making the barrel and the telescopic sight. The rifling and shaping process is carried out in Indonesia.

== User ==
- Indonesia: Indonesian Navy
