= List of equipment of the Indonesian Army =

Military equipment list

This is a list of equipment of the Indonesian Army currently in service. The Indonesian Army (Indonesian: Tentara Nasional Indonesia-Angkatan Darat, TNI–AD), the land component of the Indonesian National Armed Forces, has an estimated strength of 300,000 active personnel.

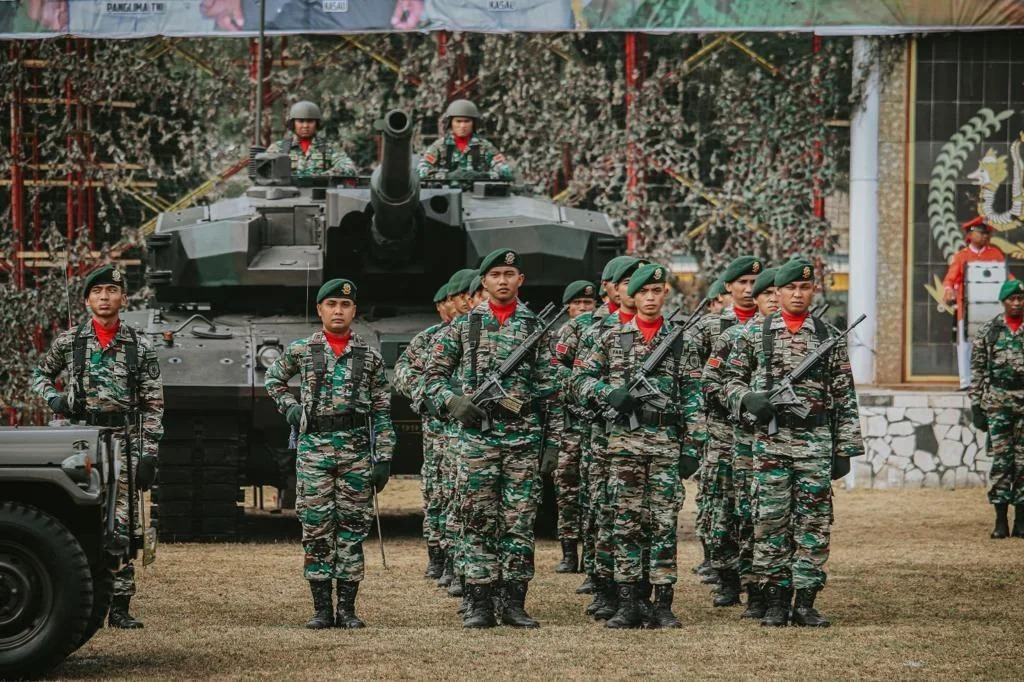
Indonesian troops with military equipment

== Individual equipment ==
=== Uniforms ===
Name	Image	Notes
PDL TNI Prima TNI Prima field uniform		"PDL TNI Prima" is the new field uniform featuring a digital camouflage pattern. The new pattern is planned to be adopted simultaneously on Oct 5, 2025, coinciding with the celebration of the National Armed Forces' 80th anniversary. Replacing the DPM inspired camouflage officially. Was also used before the universal adoption across the TNI-AD by the Kostrad. Originally known as "PDL TNI Motif Baru" or "Sage Green" or "Sage Green Digital" the name was later changed to PDL TNI Prima on 21 January 2026.
TNI Universal field uniform		Modified Version of British Disruptive Pattern Material locally known as Pakaian Dinas Lapangan (PDL) Loreng Malvinas. Previously standard issued uniform for Indonesian National Armed Forces Service Members and used in all occasions. Will be replaced with new field uniform featuring a digital camouflage pattern called "sage green digital". No longer standard issued but remained in use as the new TNI Prima uniform are being gradually rolled out to the troops, and will be discontinued once all members of the military has received the new camo.
TNI Desert field uniform		Modified Version of Tropical Malvinas which in turn a Variant of British Disruptive Pattern Material locally known as Pakaian Dinas Lapangan (PDL) Loreng Gurun. Standard Issue Uniform for Indonesian National Armed Forces Service Members for Overseas Deployment especially in Desert or Arid Condition.
Tactical Combat Gurun Army field uniform		Tactical Combat Gurun is the desert/arid color-palette for the Indonesian Multicam pattern PDL Khas Matra Darat. Unofficially called as Desert Indocam was intended to replace the older Desert Malvinas/DPM Style Pattern and was based on Tropical Version of Indonesian Army Field Uniform Camo Pattern. Sometimes officially referred to as 'Tactical Combat Gurun'.
PDL Khas Matra Darat Army field uniform		Camouflage pattern officially referred to as PDL Khas Matra Darat, is a variant of the MultiCam pattern based on the US Army Operational Camouflage Pattern (OCP) (unofficially, IndoCam) and locally as Pakaian Dinas Lapangan (PDL) Loreng Angkatan Darat "Army camo pattern". Currently, the uniform is used in conjunction for all Indonesian Army Soldiers with Loreng Malvinas and is only used for Limited Combat, Training, and other several other special occasions such as Ceremonial Events.
NKRI field uniform		Malvinas Color Palette combined with Pixelated Camouflage Pattern. The Uniform resembles the earlier developed Raider Field Uniform, the name stands for Pakaian Dinas Lapangan (PDL) Loreng Negara Kesatuan Republik Indonesia, it was phased out of service and was replaced by the Loreng Angkatan Darat as the main Army Field Uniform starting in 2022. Still in use for those who have yet to receive the IndoCam, and in certain situational condition.
Kostrad field uniform		Modified version of Kopaska Field Uniform. Initially developed by a Kostrad Officer Agus Harimurti Yudhoyono as a Special camouflage for Kostrad and its Airborne units. It features Pixelated Camouflage Pattern and was later used as the basis for Komcad Universal Field Uniform. Currently, the uniform is used in conjunction for Kostrad Soldiers with Loreng Malvinas & Loreng Angkatan Darat and is only used for Limited Combat, Training, and other several other special occasions such as Ceremonial Events.
Raider field uniform		Malvinas Color Palette combined with Pixelated Camouflage, developed for the new Raider-qualified Infantry Battalion, and it is the first Pixelated camouflage being adopted by the Indonesian National Armed Forces. Currently, the uniform is used in conjunction for Soldiers in Raider Infantry Battalion with Loreng Malvinas & Loreng Angkatan Darat and is used in Ceremonial Events only.
Kopassus field uniform		Modified Version of British Denison brushstroke locally known as Pakaian Dinas Lapangan (PDL) Loreng Darah Mengalir (Flowing Blood camouflage), it was initially used as the main Field Uniform for Kopassus before being replaced by Malvinas/DPM Camo in 1984. Currently, the uniform is used in conjunction for Kopassus Soldiers with Loreng Malvinas & Loreng Angkatan Darat and is used in Ceremonial Events only.
PDL SAMAR Spectrum Random Eye Adaptation Engineering		Used by the SAT-81/Gultor, unit of the Army Special Forces Command.
Various of MultiCam		Used by the Kopassus and SAT-81/Gultor.

=== Army uniform ===
==== Dress uniform ====
The current Indonesian Army full dress uniform known as Pakaian Dinas Upacara (PDU).

There are 4 different types of dress uniform that available: Type I, Type II, Type III, and Type IV.

New Army dress uniform – Service ribbons attached

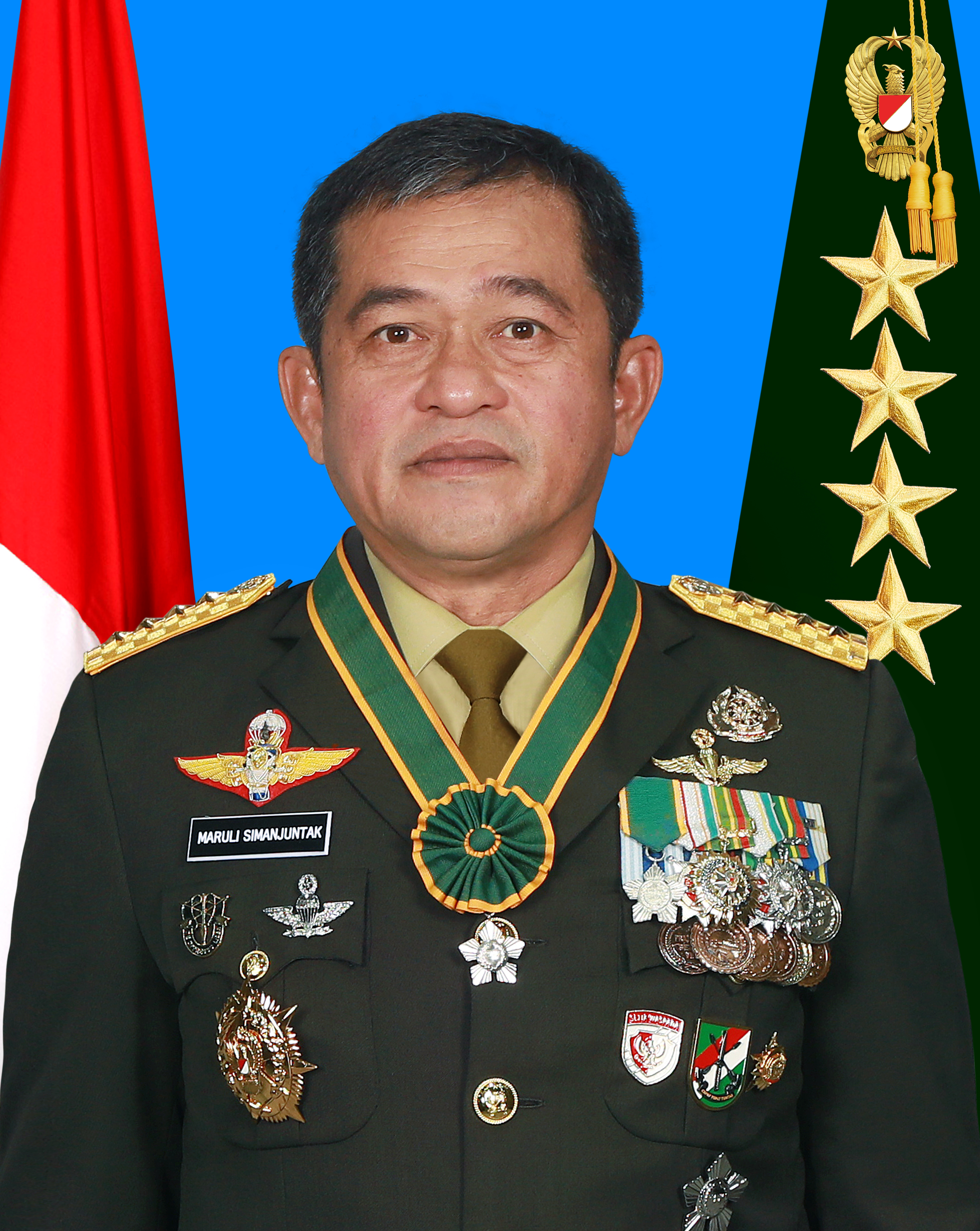
PDU I – Full medals and brevets

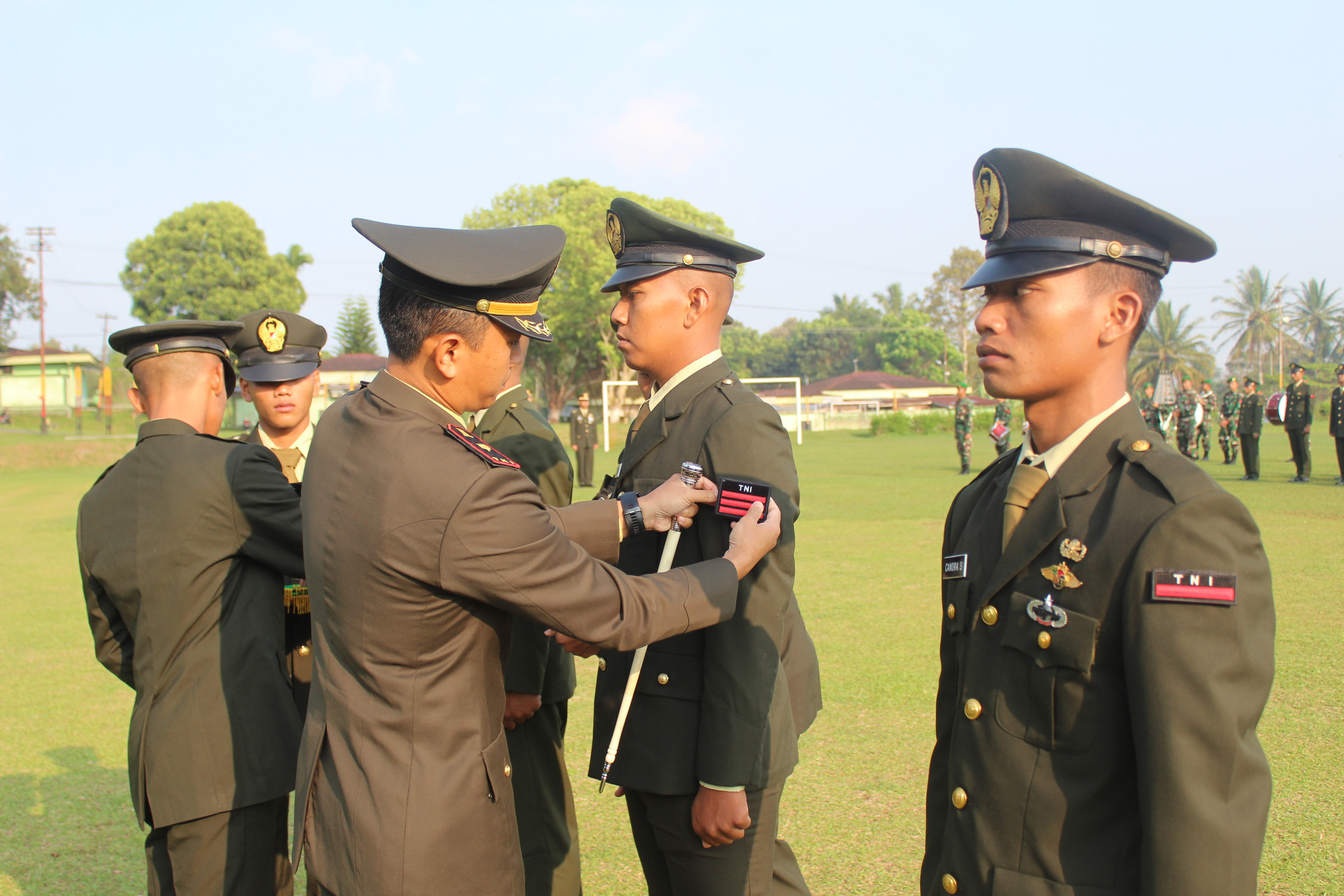
Army dress uniform

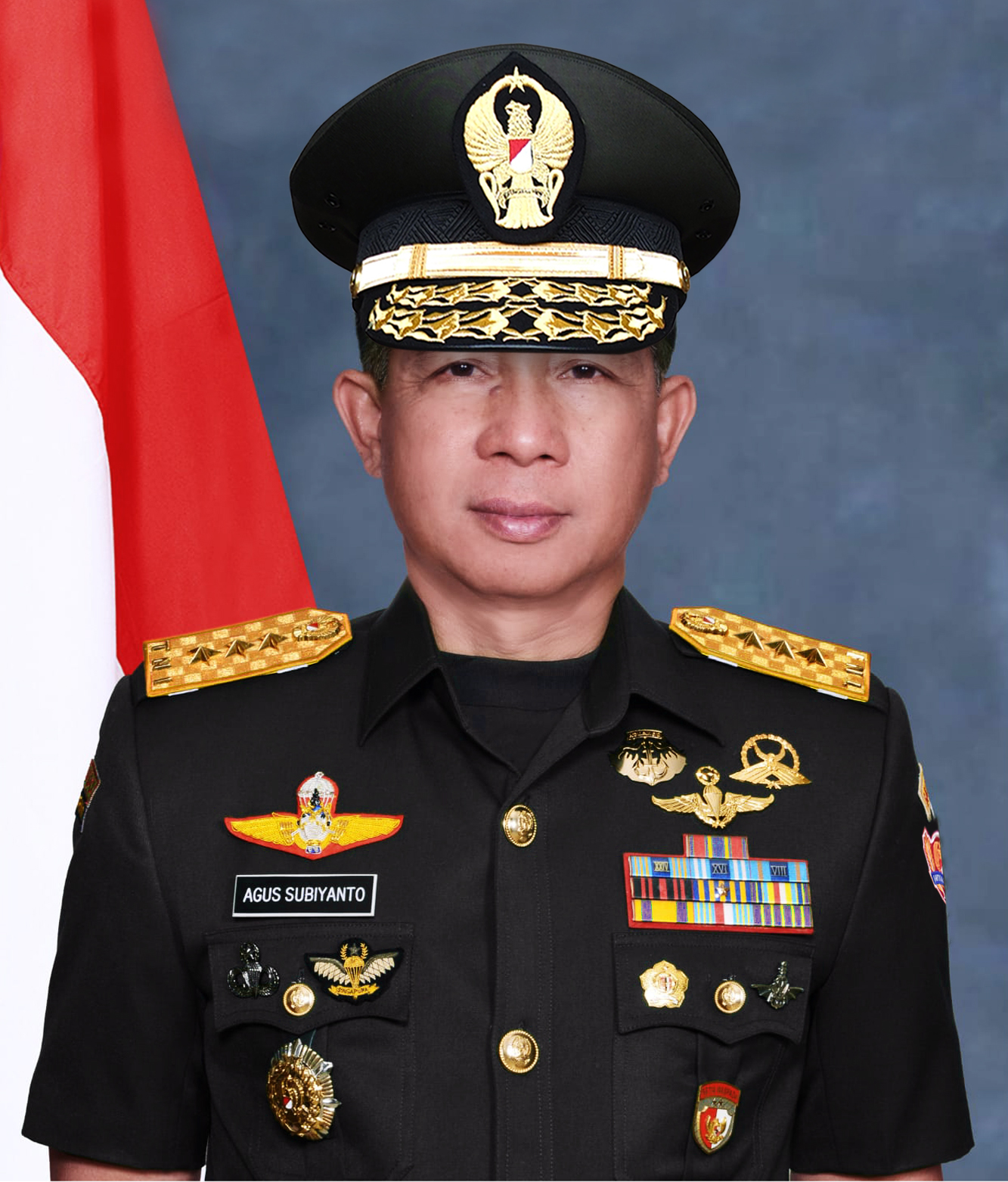
PDU IV – Service ribbons attached

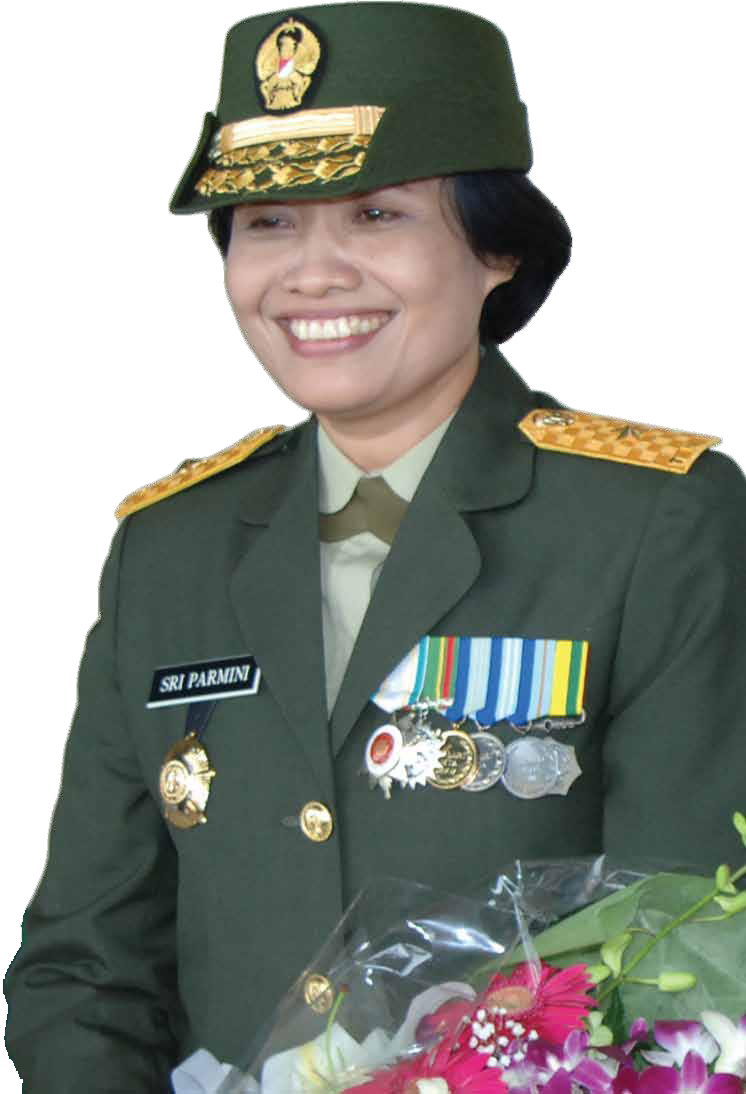
Army Dress Uniform

==== Service uniform ====
The current Indonesian Army service uniform known as Pakaian Dinas Harian (PDH). There are 3 different types of service uniform that available: Type I, Type II, and Type III.

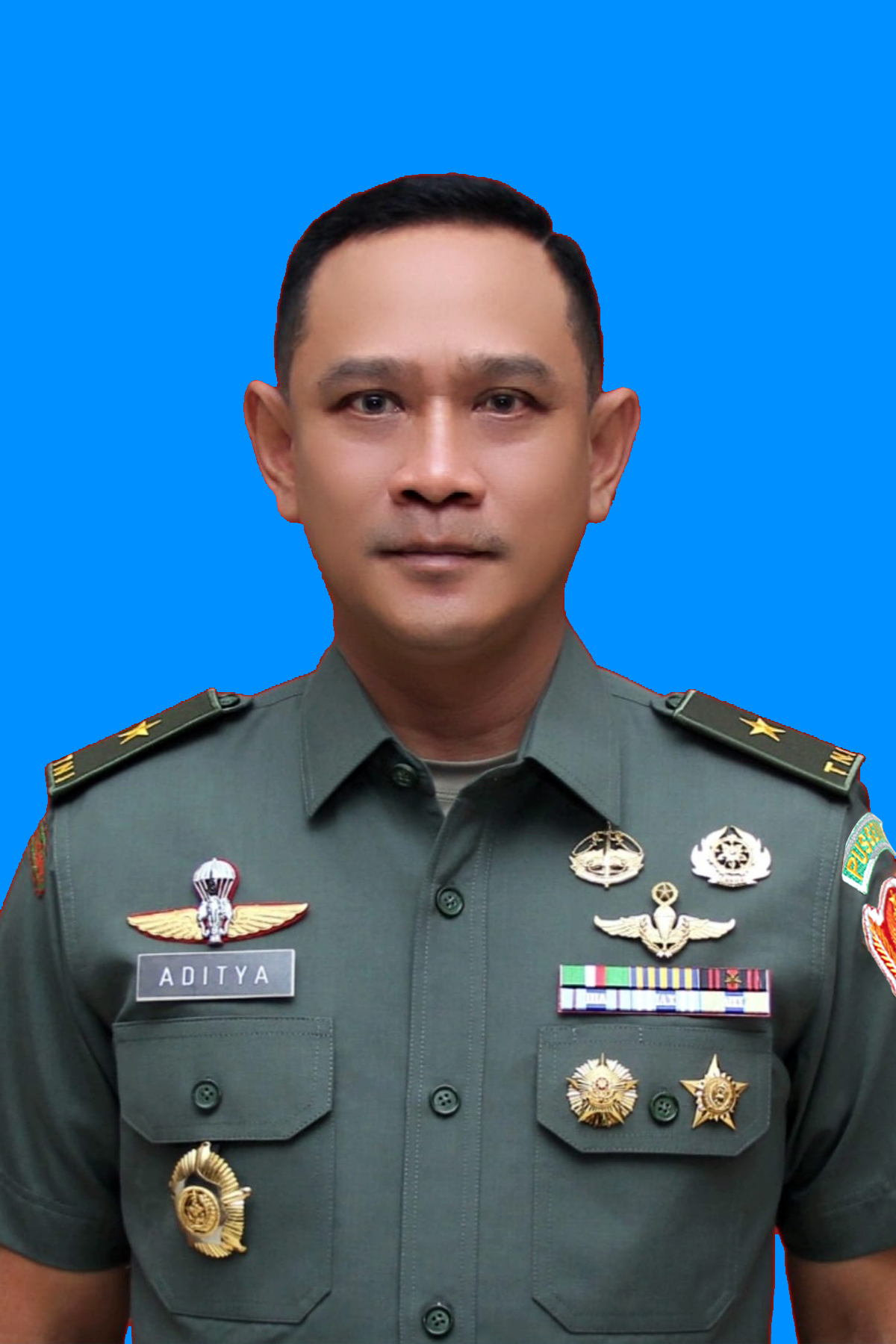
Army service uniform

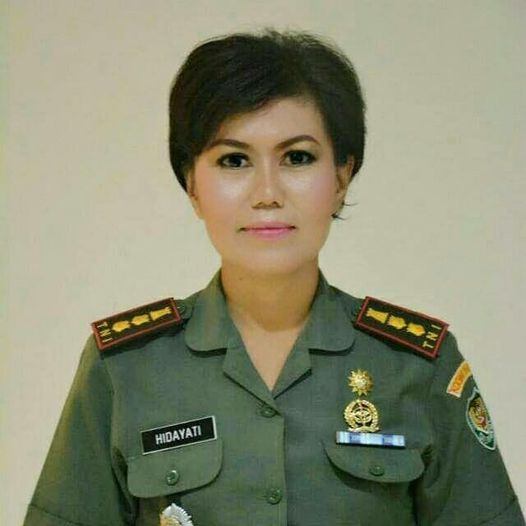
Army service uniform

==== Headgear ====
Different types of Indonesian Army headgear are:

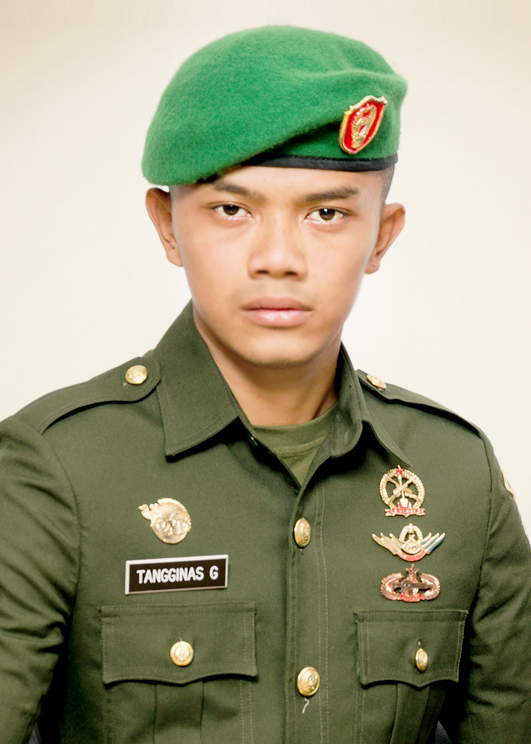
Beret (baret)

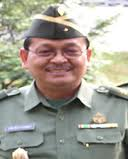
Side cap (topi mutz)

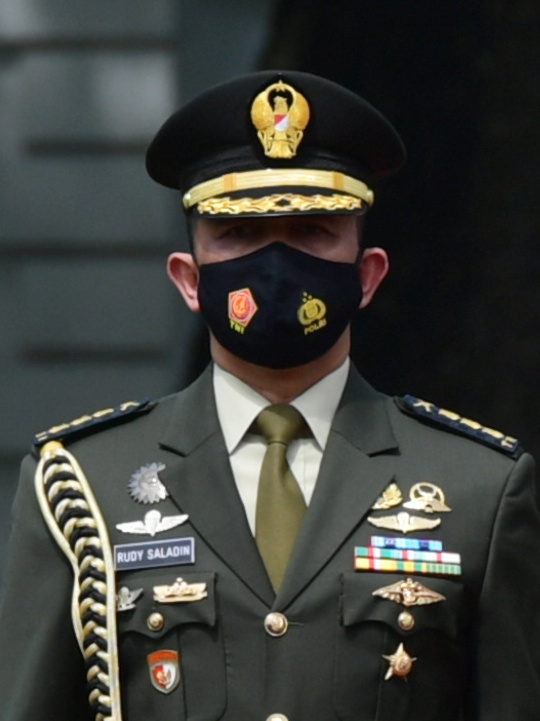
Peaked cap (topi PDU)

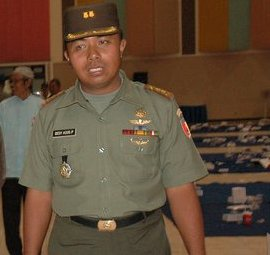
Field cap (topi pet)

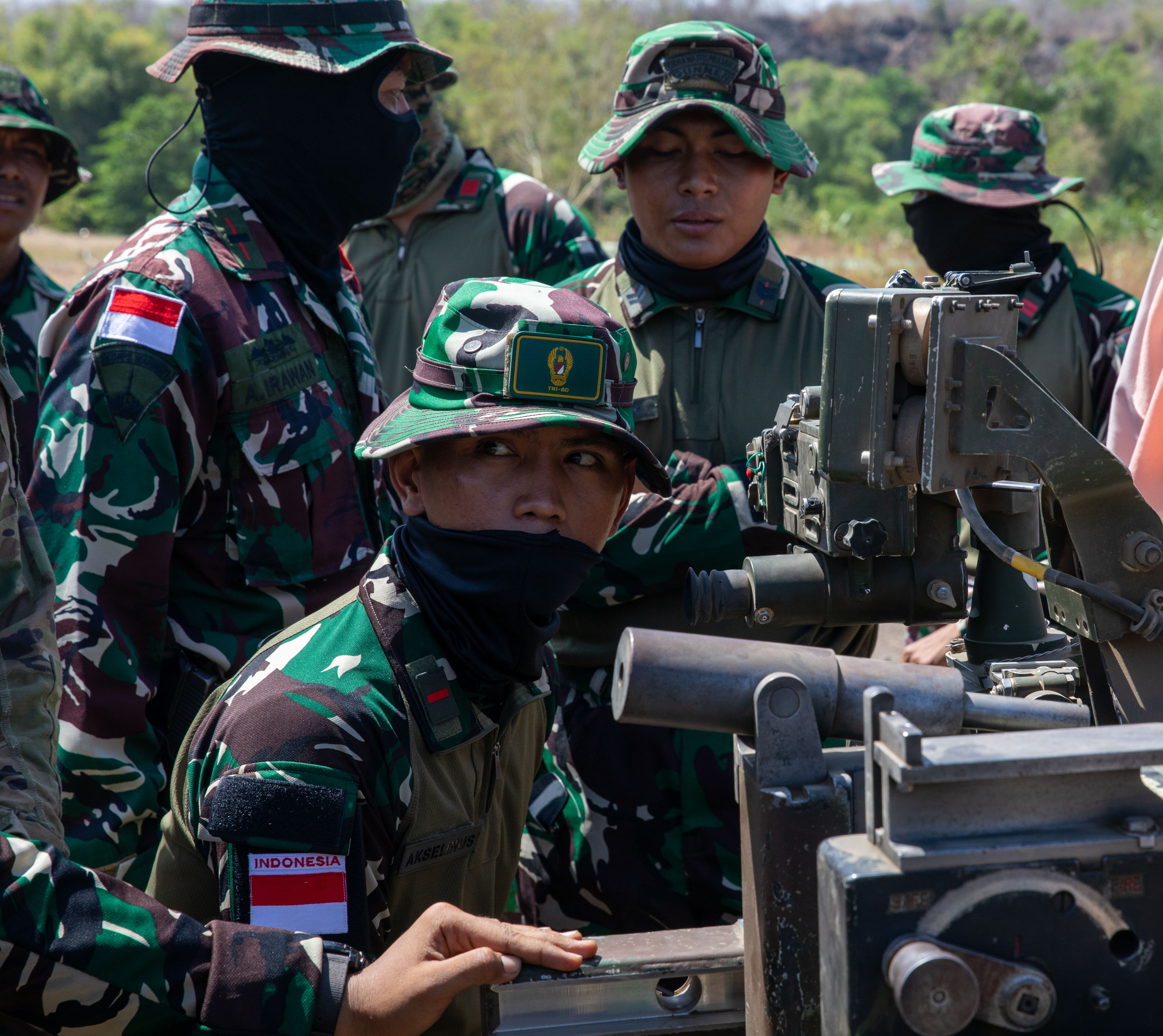
Boonie hat (topi rimba)

=== Load-carrying, vest & armour equipment ===
Name	Type	Image	Note
ALICE	load-carrying equipment		Still in use, for training purpose.
MOLLE-style	load-carrying equipment		Standard issue.
PASGT	Body armor		Large amount.
S.A.K.T.I	Plate carrier Tactical vest		Standard body armor for Kostrad and some unit.
Scalable Plate Carrier	Plate carrier		Large amount.

=== Ration ===
- Indonesian National Armed Forces Ration (Ransum TNI) - In the mid-1970s in order to standardize nutrition for soldiers in field, The Indonesian National Armed Forces (TNI) has introduced the Ransum TNI (formerly Dutch rantsoen). There are three types of ration and each daily ration consist of three menus:
  - T2P - The menus are meat-based meals (fish, beef, chicken, etc.) with cooked rice. The supplementary drinks are instant coffee, powdered fruit juice or vitamin supply, tea bags and powdered milk. This ration includes a portable stove.
  - T2SP - The menu is the same as T2P, but packaged in canned food form.
  - T2PJ - The menu consists of dry food packaged in plastic wrappers.

=== Helmets ===
Model	Image	Type	Origin	Notes
MICH		Combat helmet	United States; Indonesia	Current Standard Issue Helmet replacing PASGT in Service for Combat and Training Duties. 3 different variants of MICH has been used by the Army: MICH 2000 (Full Cut), MICH 2001 (High Cut), MICH 2002 (Gunfighter/Half Cut).
PASGT Style Helmets		Combat helmet	Germany; United Kingdom; Indonesia	Standard Issue Helmet, Procured RBR from England and then Schuberth B826 from Germany, later will be locally made modeled after the Schuberth B826. Currently started being replaced by newer MICH Helmet for Combat and Training, while PASGT Style Helmets are relegated to Non-Combat Duties.
FAST		Combat helmet	United States; Indonesia	Used by Paratrooper, Kopassus, and Kostrad Taipur
CVCH		Combat helmet	United States	Current Standard Issue Crewman Helmet for Armored Fighting Vehicle Crewman
M1 helmet		Combat helmet	United States; Indonesia	Currently phased out by PASGT, MICH, and FAST for Combat and Training duties. Plastic M1 Liners still being used by the Army Military Police, Honor Guards, and few real Steel Shell M1 is used for training in several Army School.

=== Night vision ===
Model	Image	Type	Origin	Notes
AN/PVS-14		Night-vision device	United States	In service as standard issue.
AN/PVS-7		Night-vision device	United States	In limited service.
AN/PVS-31		Night-vision device	United States	Used by Kopassus operators.
NVLS Minimus		Night-vision device	Spain	Used by Kopassus, Raider, and tier one operators.
NVLS Maximus		Night-vision device	Spain	Used by Taipur.

== Small arms ==
=== Pistols ===
Model	Image	Caliber	Type	Origin	Version	Details
Pindad P1		9×19mm	Semi-automatic pistol	Indonesia	Pindad P1 Pindad P2	Standard issue sidearm. Licensed domestic copy of the Browning Hi-Power. Approximately 30,000 P1s and 2,000 P2s manufactured.
Pindad G2		9×19mm	Semi-automatic pistol	Indonesia	G2 Combat G2 Elite	Standard issue sidearm to replace P1/P2. Regulation of the Minister of Defense of the Republic of Indonesia No.19 Year 2012 regarding Minimum Essential Force Alignment Policy.
HS2000		9×19mm	Semi-automatic pistol	Croatia	Unknown	
Mark 23		.45 ACP	Semi-automatic pistol	Germany	Mark 23	Used by Kopassus.
P226		9×19mm	Semi-automatic pistol	Switzerland	P226 P228	Used by Kopassus.
Beretta 92		9×19mm	Semi-automatic pistol	Italy	Beretta 92SB Beretta 92F	Used by Kopassus.
Five-seven		FN 5.7×28mm	Semi-automatic pistol	Belgium	Five-seven	Used by Kopassus.
Glock		9×19mm	Semi-automatic pistol	Austria	Glock 17 Glock 19	Used by Kopassus.
PP		.32 ACP	Semi-automatic pistol	Germany	PPK	Used by Kopassus. In limited service, and prison guard.
M1911		.45 ACP	Semi-automatic pistol	United States	Unknown	In limited service.
K5		9×19mm	Semi-automatic pistol	South Korea	K5	In limited service.

=== Shotguns ===
Model	Image	Caliber	Type	Origin	Version	Details
M3		12 gauge	Combat shotgun	Italy	M3T	Used by Kopassus.
Benelli M4		12 gauge	Combat shotgun	Italy		
Franchi SPAS-12		12 gauge	Combat shotgun	Italy		Used by Kopassus.
Pindad SG		12 gauge	Combat shotgun	Indonesia		Used by prison guard.

=== Submachine guns ===
Model	Image	Caliber	Type	Origin	Version	Details
PM2		9×19mm	Submachine gun	Indonesia	PM2-V1 PM2-V2 PM2-V3	Standard issue. Also used by Kopassus.
MP9		9×19mm	Submachine gun	Switzerland	MP9	Used by Kopassus.
K7		9×19mm	Submachine gun	South Korea	K7	Used by Raider units.
Uzi		9×19mm	Submachine gun	Israel	Micro Uzi	Used by Tontaipur.
MP5		9×19mm	Submachine gun	Germany	MP5 MP5SD2	Used by Raider units, Tontaipur, and Kopassus.
P90		FN 5.7×28mm	Submachine gun	Belgium	P90	Used by Kopassus.
MP7		4.6×30mm	Submachine gun	Germany	MP7A1	Used by Kopassus.

=== Rifles ===
Model	Image	Caliber	Type	Origin	Version	Details
SS1		5.56×45mm NATO	Assault rifle carbine	Belgium Indonesia	SS1-V1 SS1-V2 SS1-V3 SS1-V4 SS1-R5 Raider	Standard issue. The SS1-R5 Raider are used by the Raiders special infantry units and other units such as Kostrad or Kopassus. SS2 being issued to replace the SS1.
SS2		5.56×45mm NATO 7.62×51mm NATO	Assault rifle Semi-automatic rifle carbine	Indonesia	SS2-V1 SS2-V1 A1 SS2-V2 SS2-V2 A1 SS2-V4 SS2-V5 SS2-V5 A1 SS2-V5C SS2-Dopper	Current standard-issue assault rifle and carbine. Gradually replacing the SS1 and older weapons. Equipped with ACOG sight as standard-issue gunsight. Regulation of the Minister of Defense of the Republic of Indonesia No.19 Year 2012 regarding Minimum Essential Force Alignment Policy.
SS3		5.56×45mm NATO	Assault rifle	Indonesia	SS3-M1	Used by Kopassus.
D5		5.56×45mm NATO	Assault rifle	Indonesia	D5	Used by Kostrad.
CAR 816		5.56×45mm NATO	Assault rifle	United Arab Emirates Indonesia	PC 816 V1	Reported to be used by Kopassus, and Kostrad. Also used by the Infantry Training Center (Pusdikif TNI AD).
HK416		5.56×45mm NATO	Assault rifle	Germany	HK416	Used by Kopassus and tier one units
M4		5.56×45mm NATO	Carbine	United States	M4A1	Used by Kopassus and special units.
SIG MCX		5.56×45mm NATO	Assault rifle	United States	SIG MCX	Used by Kopassus.
SIG516		5.56×45mm NATO 7.62×51mm NATO	Assault rifle Battle rifle	United States	SIG 516 SIG 716	In service by Kopassus, Taipur, Raider, and tier one units.
Beretta ARX160		5.56×45mm NATO	Assault rifle	Italy Qatar	Barzan ARQ160	Used by several Territorial Development Infantry Battalion units.
FN SCAR		5.56×45mm NATO	Assault rifle	Belgium	SCAR-L	In service with Kostrad's Taipur.
CZ 805		5.56×45mm NATO	Assault rifle	Czech Republic	CZ 805 BREN A1	Used by Kostrad's Taipur and in limited service of Kopassus.
AR-15		5.56×45mm	Assault rifle	Czech Republic	Excalibur Army AR-15 10.5	Used by Raider units.
SG 550		5.56×45mm NATO	Assault rifle	Switzerland	SG 552	Used by Kopassus.
AUG		5.56×45mm NATO	Assault rifle	Austria	AUG A1 AUG A2 AUG A3	Used by Kopassus
FAMAS		5.56×45mm NATO	Assault rifle	France	FAMAS F1	Used by Kopassus.
G36		5.56×45mm NATO	Assault rifle	Germany	G36C	Used by Kopassus.
Galil		5.56×45mm NATO	Assault rifle	Israel	Galil MAR	The Galil MAR variant are used by the Tontaipur, reconnaissance platoons of the Kostrad.
M16		5.56×45mm NATO	Assault rifle	United States	M16A1	In limited service, previously standard issued before Pindad SS1 to replace older Pindad SP-1 series with at least 30.000 M16 procured. Still in use by some territorial units such as KODIM and KORAMIL as well as for ceremonial purposes such as Independence Day.
K2		5.56×45mm NATO	Assault rifle	South Korea	K2	In limited service.
AK-47		7.62×39mm	Assault rifle	Soviet Union	AK-47	Limited service. Only used for training and reserves purposes.
Lee–Enfield		.303 British	Bolt-action rifle	United Kingdom	SMLE Mk III	Used by some colour guard.
M1 Garand		.30-06 Springfield	Semi-automatic rifle	United States		Used for training and ceremonial purpose.

=== Designated marksman rifles ===
Model	Image	Caliber	Type	Origin	Version	Details
SPM-1		5.56×45mm NATO	Designated marksman rifle	Indonesia	SPM-1	Pindad SPM-1 as standard issue Designated marksman rifle. Used by Kostrad.
Galil		7.62×51mm NATO	Designated marksman rifle	Israel	Galil Galatz	Used by the Tontaipur.

=== Sniper rifles ===
Model	Image	Caliber	Type	Origin	Version	Details
SPR-3		7.62×51mm NATO	Sniper rifle	Indonesia	SPR-3	Standard issued.
M24		7.62×51mm NATO	Bolt-action rifle	United States	M24A2 M24A3	Used by Kopassus.
AW		7.62×51mm	Sniper rifle	United Kingdom	AW L96A1	
AWM		.300 Winchester Magnum.338 Lapua Magnum	Sniper rifle	United Kingdom	AWM	Used by Kopassus.
SPR-2		.50 BMG	Anti-materiel rifle	Indonesia		Standard issued.
M93		.50 BMG	Anti-material rifle	Serbia	M93	Used by Kopassus.
M82		.50 BMG.416 Barrett	Anti-materiel rifle Sniper rifle	United States	M82A1	Used by Kopassus.
SPR-1		7.62×51mm NATO	Sniper rifle	Indonesia		Previously standard issued before replaced by SPR-3. Currently reserved for training purposes.

=== Machine guns ===
Model	Image	Caliber	Type	Origin	Version	Details
Minimi		5.56×45mm NATO	Light machine gun	Belgium Indonesia	Minimi SM3	Standard issue. Domestically produced under licence as the Pindad SM3
Ultimax 100		5.56×45mm NATO	Light machine gun	Singapore	Mark 1 Mark 2	Also used by Kopassus.
K3		5.56×45mm NATO	Light machine gun	South Korea	K3	Also used by Kopassus.
MAG		7.62×51mm NATO	General-purpose machine gun	Belgium Indonesia	MAG SM2 V1; SM2 V2	Standard issue General-purpose machine gun. Also used by KOPASKA. Formerly produced under license with the name Pindad SPM2-V1 with tripod and V2 with bipod, also known as GPMG. Now produced as the SM2-V1 for the infantry version and SM2-V2 for the vehicle-mounted/coaxial version.
M240		7.62×51mm NATO	General-purpose machine gun	United States	M240C; M240D	Used as a Coaxial and Pintle Mounted gun for the loader in the Leopard 2 tank.
Dillon Aero minigun		7.62×51mm NATO	Gatling-type machine gun	United States	M134D	
M60		7.62×51mm NATO	General-purpose machine gun	United States	Unknown	
Madsen-Saetter		.30-06 Springfield	General-purpose machine gun	Denmark Indonesia	Mark II; Mark III	Produced under license in Pindad. Also known as SMR Madsen Saetter, SMR stands for Senapan Mesin Ringan.
M1919		.30-06 Springfield	General-purpose machine gun	United States	M1919A4	Mounted on vehicles.
STK 50MG		.50 BMG	Heavy machine gun	Singapore Indonesia	SM5	Standard issue. License produced and designated as the SM5, previously produced under the name Pindad SMB-QCB (Senapan Mesin Berat - Quick Change Barrel).
M2		.50 BMG	Heavy machine gun	United States Indonesia	M2HB; SMB-2 SM5-A1	Also used by cavalry regiments. Locally produced by Pindad as SM5-A1 (formerly SMB-2).
DShK		12.7×108mm	Heavy machine gun	Soviet Union	DShKM	mostly used by reserve units

=== Grenade launchers ===
Model	Image	Caliber	Type	Origin	Version	Details
M203		40×46mm grenade	Grenade launcher	United States Indonesia	M203A1 M203A2 SPG1	Fitted on M16, M4 and SS1 & SS2 rifles. Locally produced as the Pindad SPG1. M203 in limited use. SPG1-V1 for SS1. SPG1-V2 for SS1-V1&V2. SPG1-V3 for SS1-R5. SPG1-V4 for SS2-V1.
AG36		40×46mm grenade	Grenade launcher	Germany	AG36	Fitted on HK G36. Used by Kopassus.
M79		40×46mm grenade	Grenade launcher	United States	M79	In limited service
SAR2		38mm grenade	Grenade launcher	Indonesia	SAR2	
STK 40 AGL		40mm grenade	Automatic grenade launcher	Singapore Indonesia	SPG-3	Standard issued. Made under license by PT Pindad for the Indonesian military as Pindad SPG-3 in 1994.

=== Weapon attachments ===
Model	Image	Type	Origin	Notes
Trijicon ACOG		Telescopic sight	United States	Current Main Standard Issue Rifle Combat Optic (RCO) with the TA31 and TA11 being the common variant. Sometimes Paired with Trijicon RMR on Top.
Pindad K1SS		Telescopic sight	Indonesia	Standard Issue Rifle Combat Optic (RCO) with 4x Magnification.
Delta Optical Delta Hornet 3x Prismatic Sight		Telescopic sight	Poland	Standard Issue Rifle Combat Optic (RCO) with 3x Magnification.
Vortex Optics Spitfire		Telescopic sight	United States	Standard Issue Rifle Combat Optic (RCO) with 3x Magnification.
ELCAN Specter		Telescopic sight	United States	Rifle Combat Optic (RCO) with the Dual Role (DR) 1-4 variant. Used by Kopassus
EOTech Holographic Sight		Holographic weapon sight	United States	Current Main Standard Issue Close Combat Optic (CCO) replacing Meprolight M21
Meprolight M21		Red Dot Sight/Reflex Sight	Israel	Standard Issue Close Combat Optic (CCO), currently being replaced by EOTech Holographic weapon sight. Earliest CCO that was being used by the Indonesian Army.
Aimpoint CompM4		Red Dot Sight	United States	Used by Kopassus
Trijicon RMR		Red Dot Sight	United States	Standard issue Close Combat Optic (CCO). Often paired with Trijicon ACOG TA31 or TA11.
[UNKNOWN]		Telescopic sight	Germany	
Steiner M5x1		Telescopic sight	Germany	
Kahles ZF 69		Telescopic sight	Austria	
Lynx 8×56		Telescopic sight	South Africa	
AN/PEQ-2		IR laser and illumination	United States	
AN/PEQ-15		IR laser and illumination	United States	

=== Grenades ===
Model	Image	Caliber	Type	Origin	Version	Details
Pindad GT5			Frag grenade, High-explosive fragmentation	Indonesia	GT5 -PEA 2 GT5-HA 2 GT5-OFF	Standard Issued.
M26 grenade			Frag grenade	United States		Being phased out
M67 grenade			Frag grenade	United States South Korea	M67 K75	
F-1 grenade			Frag grenade	Soviet Union		In limited service
Pindad GT5-AS			Smoke grenade	Indonesia	GT5-AS GT6-AS	Standard Issued.
Pindad GT5-DE			Stun grenade	Indonesia		Standard Issued.

=== Mortars ===
Model	Image	Caliber	Type	Origin	Version	Details
MO-1		60 mm mortar	Mortar	Indonesia	MO-1	
MO-2		60 mm mortar	Mortar	Indonesia	MO-2	
MO-3		81mm mortar	Mortar	Indonesia	MO-3	
Type 87		81mm mortar	Mortar	China	W87	In limited service, mostly used in training
81 KRH 71 Y		81mm mortar	Mortar	Finland	81 KRH 71 Y	Also known as Mortir Tampella

=== Anti-tank ===
Model	Image	Caliber	Type	Origin	Version	Details
M80		64mm HEAT	Shoulder-fired missile	Yugoslavia	M80	In limited service
Armbrust		67mm	Anti-tank weapon	Germany	Armbrust AT	Being replaced and phased out; used by Kopassus.
SPG-9		73mm	Recoilless rifle	Soviet Union Bulgaria	ATGL	Bulgarian made SPG-9, In limited service, some are retired, some are on display on Satria Mandala Museum
AT4		84mm	Shoulder-launched missile weapon	Sweden	AT4	
M2CG		84mm	Recoilless rifle	Sweden	M2CG	Also used by Kopassus.
LRAC F1		89mm HEAT	Shoulder-launched missile weapon	France	LRAC 89 F1	In limited service
C90-CR (M3)		90mm HEAT	Anti-tank	Spain	C90-CR (M3)	In use with the infantry units and Special Forces. Versions C-90CR antiarmor, C-90-CR-RB (M3), C-90AM antipersonnel and C-90BK bunker buster.
MILAN		115mm HEAT	Anti-tank guided missile	France	MILAN 2	276 Launchers
PF-98		120mm HEAT	Anti-tank rocket	China	PF-98	In limited service
9K11 Malyutka		125mm HEAT	Anti-tank guided missile	Soviet Union	AT-3	Being phased out
FGM-148 Javelin		127mm HEAT	Anti-tank missile	United States	Block I Javelin	
9K115-2 Metis-M		130mm HEAT	Anti-tank guided missile	Russia	AT-13	
NLAW		150mm HEAT	Anti-tank missile launcher	Sweden United Kingdom	NLAW	600 Launchers
SS.11		165mm HEAT	Anti-tank guided missile	France	SS.11	Being phased out

== Ground vehicles ==
Vehicle	Image	Origin	Type	Version	Quantity	Notes
Tank
Leopard 2		Germany	Main battle tank	Leopard 2A4+ Leopard 2RI	103	Equipped with DM11, DM53, DM78, DM88, DM98 and RH88 ammunition. Indonesia purchased 42 units Leopard 2A4+ and 61 units Leopard 2RI plus 10 support vehicles from German Army surplus.
Kaplan MT / Harimau		Turkey Indonesia	Medium Main battle tank	Harimau	18	Jointly designed and developed by FNSS and PT Pindad for the army's MMWT program. Armed with 105mm Cockerill 3105 turret. First batch of 10 tanks have been received in February 2024, and the remaining 8 have been delivered by October of the same year.
FV101 Scorpion		United Kingdom	Light tank	FV101 Scorpion 90	90	Acquired in 1995. As of 2016, 90 operational according to IISS Military Balance. Armed with 90mm Cockerill M-A1 Mk3 Gun on Alvis AC 90 turret.
AMX-13		France Netherlands	Light tank	AMX-13/75 Modèle 51 FL-10; AMX-13/105 Modèle 58 FL-12; AMX-13/105 Retrofit	120+	175 AMX-13/75 and 130 AMX-13/105 or total of 305 AMX-13 acquired in 1960s. As of 2018, Janes reported that only half of the fleet (120+) operational and the remaining tanks were upgraded and retrofitted with new fire control system and 105mm rifled gun by PT Pindad. AMX-13 will be replaced by Harimau Medium Tank/Kaplan MT.
Armoured vehicle
Marder		Germany	Infantry fighting vehicle	Marder 1A2; Marder 1A3	50	50 1A3s including 8 spares. Purchased from German Army surplus. Armed with 20mm Rh 202 autocannon turret.
M113		Belgium Italy	Armoured personnel carrier	M113A1-BE; M113A1-BE Arisgator	160	Being phased out. Acquired from Belgian army's surplus in 2014–2017. 150 M113A1-BE APCs and 10 M113 Arisgator in service. Armed with 12.7mm machine gun.
Alvis Stormer		United Kingdom	Armoured personnel carrier	Stormer APC	40	in limited service, Acquired in 1995 together with FV101 Scorpion 90.
AMX-VCI		France Netherlands	Armoured personnel carrier	AMX-VCI; AMX-VCI Retrofit	75	Being phased out, Total of 200 AMX-VTT/VCI acquired in 1960s. As 2016, only 75 remains in service according to IISS Military Balance and the remaining vehicles were upgraded by PT Pindad.
Pandur II		Czech Republic Austria	Armoured fighting vehicle	Pandur II IFV	26	Locally known as Cobra 8x8. The variant includes APC, IFV (30mm), and FSV (105mm) and will be manufactured locally by PT Pindad.
Pindad Anoa		Indonesia	Armoured personnel carrier	APS-3 Anoa I APS-3 Anoa II; APS-3 Anoa VVIP; APS-3 Anoa Mortar Carrier (81mm)	500	As 2019 about 400 vehicle delivered according to PT Pindad. Additional 26 were delivered to the Army in January 2022. 12 vehicles delivered in 2024. Armed with 12.7mm machine gun, 7.62mm machine gun or 40mm AGL. 4 vehicle (3 in VVIP configuration) were known to be used by Paspampres.
Pindad Badak		Indonesia	Fire support vehicle	Badak FSV	14	Developed from Anoa by PT Pindad. Armed with Cockerill CSE 90LP turret. As of 2018, the order was reduced from 50 to 14 vehicles. It is intended to replace the Alvis Saladin. In January 2022, 7 vehicles were delivered to the Army. Another 3 vehicles were delivered to the Army in February 2024.
Hanwha Tarantula		South Korea	Amphibious fire support vehicle	Tarantula (Black Fox 6x6) FSV	22	Armed with Cockerill CSE 90LP turret. 11 units of the vehicles are assembled by PT Pindad.
WZ551		China	Armoured personnel carrier	WMZ-551NB APC	Unknown	Used by Tontaipur Special Force of Kostrad.
Véhicule de l'Avant Blindé		France	Armoured personnel carrier	VAB VTT; VAB Valorisé VTT; VAB SAN; VAB PC	50	Some 18 units were bought in 1997. Another 32 followed in 2006 for UNIFIL mission, including 6 Ambulance and 2 PC variants.
Cadillac Gage Commando		United States	Armoured fighting vehicle	V-150 APC - Twin-Light Machine Gun Turret; V-150 APC - Parapet and pintle mounted machine gun V-150 FSV - 90mm Mecar Gun; V-150 Reconnaissance - Twin-Machine Gun Turret (12,7mm & 7,62mm)	58	Total of 200 V-150 was purchased in 1977–1980. Currently 58 in service.
Casspir		South Africa	Mine-Resistant Ambush Protected Vehicle	Casspir Mk3 APC	2	Register of Conventional Arms (UNROCA) reported that 2 Casspir bought in 2004 and used by Unit 81 of Kopassus special forces.
Bushmaster Protected Mobility Vehicle		Australia Indonesia	Mine-Resistant Ambush Protected Vehicle	Bushmaster Troop Carrier	18	Used by Kopassus and produced in Indonesia as Sanca MRAP by PT Pindad. In September 2021, Australia announced that it would donate 15 Bushmasters to Indonesia to support peacekeeping missions. On 8 August 2023, Indonesia received the 15 units of donated Bushmasters.
Chaiseri First Win		Thailand	Mine-Resistant Ambush Protected Vehicle	Hanoman	Unknown	Used by Kopassus.
Mamba APC		United Kingdom	Mine-Resistant Ambush Protected Vehicle	Mamba Mk2 Alvis 8 4x4 APC	Unknown	Used by Unit 81 of the Kopassus special forces.
Patriot I		Czech Republic	Mine-Resistant Ambush Protected Vehicle	Patriot I APC	100	There are rumours that 100 more on order by undisclosed customer in SEA which is probably Indonesia.
Kozak		Ukraine	Mine-Resistant Ambush Protected Vehicle	Kozak-2M	2	2 units of Kozak-2M have been delivered as 7 January 2021
Pindad Komodo		Indonesia	Armoured vehicle	Komodo APC; Komodo Recon; Komodo Battering Ram (Halilintar); Komodo Mistral Atlas	100+	The Indonesian Army special forces (Kopassus) make the first order for special purpose vehicle (Halilintar). Then, another variant fitted with Mistral Atlas SAM launcher ordered and followed by another order for mobile command and communication version. Another 51 vehicles "Komodo Nexter" ordered in 2019 consists of: Battalion Command Vehicle (BnCV); Battery Command vehicle (BCV); Meteo Vehicle (MeV); Forward Observer Vehicle (FoV); Relay Vehicle (ReV); Logistic Vehicle (LoG).; Additional 10 vehicles has been delivered to the Army in January 2022. As of 2024, approximately 137 Komodo in service or on order.
Light tactical vehicle/Light scout vehicle/Light strike vehicle
BTR-40		Soviet Union	Light personnel carrier	BTR-40 Armoured Reconnaissance Vehicle	85	Total of 100 originally but 85 still in service. Locally modified from armoured personnel carrier to armoured reconnaissance variants.
SSE P1 PAKCI		Indonesia	Light personnel carrier	P1 Pakci APC	3	Made by PT SSE. Used as battering ram vehicle by Kopassus special force.
Pindad APR-1		Indonesia	Light personnel carrier	APR-1V APC	12	A light 4x4 armored vehicle based on a commercial Isuzu truck chassis made by PT Pindad. Total of about 40 units were planned with only 14 units delivered and deployed during Aceh Insurgency, 2 vehicle destroyed during December 2004 Tsunami.
URO VAMTAC		Spain	Light tactical vehicle	VAMTAC ST5 RapidRanger; VAMTAC LTV	57	40 unit ST5 fitted with RapidRanger MMS automatic launcher for 10 battery ST5 fitted with RapidRanger automatic launcher as part of Thales ForceShield Integrated Air Defence System. LTV fitted with Lightweight Multiple Launcher (LML/LML-NG) and also used as support vehicle for Thales ForceShield Integrated Air Defence System.
Renault Sherpa Light		France	Light tactical vehicle	Sherpa Light Scout; Sherpa Light Scout Armored; Sherpa Weapon System Carrier MPCV	18	12 Sherpa Light Scout units bought in 2011 together with VAB 320 power packs from Renault Trucks Defense. Used to be license produced by PT Pindad as Elang recon vehicles. 6 Sherpa Light Scout Armored were bought in 2017 to be used by Indobatt continget on UNIFIL mission. Several Weapon System Carrier variant were bought as platform for MPCV launching system as part of MBDA Ground Based Air Defence system.
Panhard VBL		France	Light scout vehicle	VBL	18	
Cadillac Gage Commando Scout		United States	Light scout vehicle	Commando Scout Twin-Machine Gun Turret; Commando Scout Observation Turret	28	Used by Paspampres and Tontaipur Special Force of Kostrad.
SSE P6 ATAV		Indonesia	Light strike vehicle	P6 ATAV	100+	Made by PT SSE. Used by Kopassus special force. Armed with 1x 7,62mm machine gun & 2x 5,56mm light machine gun or 1x M134D minigun & 2x 5,56mm light machine gun.
ILSV		Indonesia	Light strike vehicle		100+	Made by J-Forces and Indonesian Aerospace, different variants were made.
Flyer Light Strike Vehicle	Spider LSV avec missiles SPIKE	Australia	Light strike vehicle	Flyer R-12D LSV	5	
Utility
Pionierpanzer 2		Germany	Combat engineering vehicle	Pionierpanzer 2 Dachs AEV	3	The Indonesian Army ordered 3 Pionierpanzer which were formerly used by the Bundeswehr.
Brückenlegepanzer		Germany	Armoured vehicle-launched bridge	Panzerschnellbrücke Biber AVLB	3	
Bergepanzer 3		Germany	Armoured recovery vehicle	Bergepanzer 3 Büffel ARV	3	
Fahrschulpanzer	Leopard2 drivingschool	Germany	Driver training vehicle	Fahrschulpanzer Leopard 2	1	
M108 SPG		United States	Fire direction and command vehicle	M108 VBCL	4	Fire direction and command variant converted from Belgium M108 SPH. Acquired from Belgium together with 36 M109A4-BE howitzer.
M113		United States	Armoured recovery vehicle	M113A1-B-Rec; M113A1-B-MTC	Unknown	Similar to M806 (XM806); Similar to the M579
AMX-13		France Netherlands	Armoured multi-purpose vehicle	AMX-13 Modèle 55 (AMX-D) ARV	Unknown	
AMX-VTT		France	Armoured medical evacuation vehicle	AMX-VCTB	Unknown	
Alvis Stormer		United Kingdom	Armoured multi-purpose vehicle	Stormer Recovery; Stormer Ambulance; Stormer HMLC; Stormer Command Vehicle; Stormer Bridge Layer	Unknown	The vehicles purchased consist of personnel carrier, command post, ambulance, recovery, logistics and bridge laying variant.
Bandvagn 206		Sweden	Multi-purpose all-terrain vehicle	BV206 (BV2062A) Soft Top with ammo body	Unknown	Used by 2nd Group of the Kopassus special forces.
GAZ-34039		Russia	Multi-purpose all-terrain vehicle	GAZ-34039 Irbis	Unknown	
Pindad Anoa		Indonesia	Armoured multi-purpose vehicle	APS-3 Anoa Logistic; APS-3 Anoa Command Post; APS-3 Anoa Ambulace; APS-3 Anoa Recovery	Unknown	
Pindad Komodo		Indonesia	Armoured multi-purpose vehicle	Komodo Command Post; Komodo Ambulance	Unknown	Komodo Command Post (fire direction and command) variant of Pindad Komodo APC used as part of CAESAR SPH System. Komodo Ambulance was deployed by Garuda Contingent on UN mission in Sudan.
Pindad Maung		Indonesia	Military light utility vehicle	MV1 (soft top) MV3 Tangguh MV3 Komando MV3 Jelajah (soft top) MV3 Mobile Jammer + anti-drone system + SM5-A1 cal. 12.7 mm	947	947 have been received of a total of 5.500 orders
Avibras Astros II		Brazil	Battery support vehicle	AV-MET (Tatra T815-7 4x4); AV-RMD (Tatra T815-7 6x6); AV-UCF (Tatra T815-7 6x6); AV-PCC (Tatra T815-7 4x4); AV-VCC (Tatra T815-7 4x4); AV-OFVE (Tatra T815-7 6x6)	Unknown	Mobile weather station (AV-MET); Ammunition transporter/loader (AV-RMD); Radar fire control vehicle (AV-UCF); Battery Command and control vehicle (AV-PCC); Battalion Command and control vehicle (AV-VCC); Field repair/workshop vehicle (AV-OFVE)
M3 Amphibious Rig		Czech Republic	Amphibious bridging vehicle	M3I Amphibious Rig	18	Made by Czech Excalibur Army.
Pandur II		Czech Republic Austria	Support vehicle	Pandur II TCVA	3	Pandur II APC with raised exhaust pipe and add-on buoyancy kit for better amphibious capability. Used as support vehicle for M3I Rig.
Tatra FORCE T815-7 Trackway		Czech Republic	Trackway layer vehicle	T815-7 6×6 truck with FAUN HGMS-IV Trackway System	5	Heavy Ground Mobility System - Independent Variant (HGMS-IV). Fitted with FAUN Trackrack-IV with 30m of M150 Trackway with MLC70 capability.
KIA KM500		South Korea	Multi-purpose vehicle	KM500	50	Used as towing vehicles for KH-179 howitzer.
KIA KM250	M35 6x6 Truck - Marines(A)	South Korea	Multi-purpose vehicle	KM250	Unknown	Used as towing vehicles for KH-178 howitzer.
M35 2½-ton cargo truck		United States	Multi-purpose vehicle	M35; M49; M60	500	
Kaiser Jeep M715		United States	Light utility vehicle Medical evacuation vehicle	M715	Unknown	Ordered in the 1970s. Formerly used by the United States Army during the Vietnam War.
Land Rover Defender		United Kingdom Poland	Multi-purpose vehicle	Ulan (6x6); Defender 90 (4x4); Defender 110 (4x4)	200+	Ulan (6x6) version bought from Poland-based JLR (developed from Huzar 6x6) were used as a carrier for Poprad launcher, WD-95 command vehicle and radar carrier as part of Kobra Modular Air Defence System. 90 (4x4) version were used by military police units. 110 (4x4) version were used as towing vehicle for ZUR-23-2 kg-I as part of Kobra Modular Air Defence System, some newer build were used as a carrier for LML launcher as part of Thales ForceShield Integrated Air Defence System and also a lot of older build were used for some other purposes on army service.
Land Rover Wolf	LT SOP	United Kingdom	Special purpose vehicle	Land Rover Wolf 110 WMIK (4x4); Land Rover Wolf 90 (4x4)	Unknown	Used by Kopassus special forces. Mostly fitted with 12.7mm HMG or 40mm AGL.
Jankel Al-Thalab		United Kingdom	Long range patrol vehicle	Al-Thalab LRPV (4x4)	Unknown	First unveiled at 2017 TNI military parade. Used by Kopassus special force. Armed with 7,62mm or 12,7mm machine gun.
Unimog		Germany	Multi-purpose vehicle	Unimog U1300L (4x4); Unimog U1300L Double-Cab (4x4); Unimog U1550 (4x4); Unimog U5000 (4x4)	200+	200 U1300L family ordered in 1981. One U1300L Double-Cab are converted into amphibious vehicles in 2013. Unimog U5000 units were used as a carrying platform for (Mistral Coordination Post) as part of MBDA Ground Based Air Defence system.
Mercedes-Benz NG	Pumpen OV Paderborn	Germany	Multi-purpose vehicle	Mercedes-Benz NG74 1017 (4x4); Mercedes-Benz NG85 2028 LS (6x6)	Unknown	NG85 2028 version were used as carrier for Saab Giraffe 40 radar.
Mercedes-Benz Atego	Eddie Stobart (F1519) YP60DPN (8751856868)	Germany	Mobile field hospital	Mercedes-Benz Atego 1528 (4x2)	Unknown	Used as mobile surgical field hospital by medical battalion of first Kostrad's infantry division.
Iveco Eurotrakker	MAN CLA 26.280 6x4 rear tipper for overseas market. Spielvogel 1	Italy	Multi-purpose vehicle	Iveco Eurotrakker MP 380 (6x6)	Unknown	Used by the fourth army engineering battalion. Also used as a tank transporter for AMX-13 tanks.
RMMV TGS	TG MIL TGS (8x8) Swedish Army trials vehicle	Germany	Battery support vehicle	TG MIL TGS (8x8)	Unknown	Used as carrier for CONTROLMaster 200 radar/command station as part of Thales ForceShield Integrated Air Defence Systems.
Volvo N	1986 Volvo N10	Sweden	Battery support vehicle	Volvo N10 Turbo (6x4)	Unknown	Also used as carrier for Saab Giraffe 40 radar.
Tiema XC		China	Battery support vehicle	Tiema XC2030 (4x4)	Unknown	Used as platform for Battery Command and Control Vehicle (BCCV) as part of Giant Bow II air defence system.
Sinotruk HOWO	Chinese military truck during China's 60th anniversary parade	China	Battery support vehicle	Sinotruk HOWO (4x4)	Unknown	Used as platform for AS901A 3D searching radar as part of Giant Bow II air defence system.
Shaanxi SX		China	Battery support vehicle	Shaanxi SX-2110 (4x4); Shaanxi SX-2153 (6x6)	Unknown	Used as Battery Command Vehicle (4x4), mobile launcher (4x4) and SR-74 searching radar (6x6) as part of CPMIEC TD2000B Missile-Gun Integrated Air Defense System.
Isuzu NPS		Japan	Multi-purpose vehicle	Isuzu Elf NPS (4x4); Isuzu NPS 75 (4x4); Isuzu NPS (4x4)	500+	
Isuzu FVZ		Japan	Multi-purpose vehicle	Isuzu FVZ 34 (6x4)	200+	Used as ammunition carrier in army services.
Iveco Trakker 380	IMFT 6 2015 368	Italy	Multi-purpose vehicle	Iveco Trakker AD380T 38H (6x4)	Unknown	Being used as MGB (Medium Girder Bridge) carrier by Kostrad Engineering Corps.
Iveco Astra		Italy	Tank transporter	Iveco Astra HD9 (6x6) with Crew Cabin; Iveco Astra HD9 (6x6) with Basic Cabin	Unknown	Fitted with DOLL 3-axles Military Semi-Trailers (Semi Low-Loaders) from Germany.
Scania P		Sweden	Tank transporter	Scania P360 (6x6) with Crew Cabin	Unknown	Fitted with PATRiA 2-axles Low Bed Trailer 30 from Indonesia.
Scania G		Sweden	Tank transporter	Scania G410 (6x6) with Crew Cabin	Unknown	Fitted with PATRiA 2-axles Low Bed Trailer 30 from Indonesia.
Bedford MT		United Kingdom	Tank transporter	Bedford MT DROPS (4x4)	Unknown	
Leyland DAF DROPS	Leyland DAF DROPS Heavy Utility Truck (Demountable Rack Offload and Pickup System) pic5	United Kingdom	Tank transporter	Leyland DAF Scammel S-26 DROPS (8x6)	8	
OKA 4WD	SESWA OKA 4WD	Australia	Special purpose vehicle	OKA NT (4x4) Assault Ladder Vehicle	Unknown	Used by Unit 81 of Kopassus special force.
Božena		Slovakia	Remotely operated demining vehicle	Božena 4+	2	
TREVA-15	TREVA-15	Czech Republic	Armored recovery vehicle	TREVA-15	2	

== Artillery and missiles ==
Model	Image	Origin	Type	Version	Quantity	Notes
Ballistic Missile
Bora		Turkey	Tactical ballistic missile	Khan ITBM-600	4 batteries	First batch delivered in September 2025, second batch to be delivered in early 2026.
Rocket launcher
Avibras Astros II		Brazil	Multi caliber multiple rocket launcher	Astros II Mk6 (AV-LMU) - Tatra T815-7 (6x6)	63	Equipped with Rheinmetall FieldGuard 3 Fire Control and Measuring System (AV-UCF). Order of 36 launchers were confirmed to have been made before February 2019. Further batch of 27 launchers were received in June 2020.
Howitzer
Nexter CAESAR		France	155 mm self-propelled howitzer	CAESAR - Renault Sherpa 10 (6x6)	55	37 units have been purchased in 2012 and another 18 equipped with Nexter FINDART artillery firing control system have been ordered in 2017 for a total of 55 howitzers in service. Excluding training simulators and auxiliary vehicles.
M109		United States	155 mm self-propelled howitzer	M109A4-BE	36	36 used M109A4-BEs bought from Belgian Army.
AMX Mk-61		Netherlands France	105 mm self-propelled howitzer	AMX Mk 61	54	Original 54 Purchased. Not all operational.
FH-2000		Singapore	155 mm self-propelled howitzer	FH-2000	8	Used for training purpose only.
KH-179		South Korea	155 mm towed artillery	KH-179	18	Developed from M114A1 howitzer.
KH-178		South Korea	105 mm towed artillery	KH-178	54	Developed from M101 howitzer.
M101		United States	105 mm towed artillery	M2A2	180	Used by at least 10 field artillery battalions across Indonesia. If 1 field artillery battalion consist of 18 guns, then its approximately 180 guns for 10 field artillery battalions. At least 171 units according to LOA in 1981
M48		Yugoslavia	76 mm mountain gun	M-48 (B-1A1-I)	126 (estimated)	Used by at least 7 field artillery battalions across Indonesia. Currently on retiring process and will be replaced by more modern guns.
Heckler & Koch M635		Germany	75 mm saluting gun	M635	18	Used by 7th Field Artillery Battalion for ceremonial purpose.
Surface-to-air missile
Starstreak		United Kingdom	Short range air defense	Starstreak HVM	10 Batteries	10 battery of Starstreak missile system equipped with lightweight multiple launcher (LML) and LML-NG (Next Generation) mounted on Land Rover Defender and URO Vamtac LTV, RapidRanger Multi-Mission Launcher (MMS) mounted on URO Vamtac ST5, and CONTROLMaster 200 radar/command station as part of Thales ForceShield Integrated Air Defence System have been purchased at a cost of over £100m.
Martlet		United Kingdom	Short range air defense	LMM Martlet	Unknown	Unknown number, used with Thales ForceShield system. First spotted during Latbakjatrat 2022 exercise used by Army 14th Air Defence Artillery Battalion (Yonarhanud 14).
Mistral		France	Short range air defense	Mistral M3	Unknown	Several batteries of Mistral missile equipped with Atlas launcher mounted on Pindad Komodo 4x4, MPCV launching system mounted on Renault Sherpa, and Mistral Coordination Post as part of MBDA Ground Based Air Defence have been acquired.
Grom		Poland	Short range air defense	PZR Grom	2 Batteries	2 battery (2 system) of Grom missile have been acquired as part of Kobra (Aster) Modular Air Defence System equipped with Poprad launcher mounted on Land Rover Defender, twin launchers mounted on Zur-23-2 kg 23mm automatic cannon, "Soła" 3D multi-beam searching radar (MSSR), and WD-95 battery command vehicle.
RBS 70		Sweden	Short range air defense	RBS-70 Mk 1 RBS-70 Mk 2	Unknown	Indonesia operating RBS-70 Mk 1 and RBS-70 Mk 2 missile integrated with Saab Giraffe radars.
QW-3		China	Short range air defense	TD2000B	1 Battery	A battery of QW-3 missile equipped with automatic launcher mounted on Shaanxi truck, 57 mm AA autocannon, SR-74 searching radar, and fire control command vehicle as part of CPMIEC TD2000B missile–gun integrated air defense system have been acquired.
Anti-aircraft gun
Rh-202 Twin Gun		Germany	20 mm twin mounted anti-aircraft autocannon	Rheinmetall Zwillingsflak Rh-202 20 mm Twin Gun	121~	Integrated with Saab Giraffe radar.
ZUR-23-2KG		Poland	23 mm anti-aircraft autocannon	ZUR-23-2KG-I 23 mm Twin Gun TR-23-2	24 2	Purchased as part of the Kobra Modular Air Defence system
Giant Bow II		China	23 mm anti-aircraft autocannon	Giant Bow II 23 mm Twin Gun	18	Integrated with Battery Command and Control Vehicle (BCCV) and AS901A 3D searching radar.
Bofors L-70		Sweden	40 mm anti-aircraft autocannon	Bofors 40 mm L/70	90~	Integrated with Super Fledermaus fire control radar unit.
S-60	ParkPatriot2015part8-42	Soviet Union	57 mm anti-aircraft gun	AZP S-60 57 mm AZP S-60 Retrofit	188 48	Several guns were integrated with searching radar as part of CPMIEC TD2000B missile–gun integrated air defense system. 188 S-60, and 48 retrofit S-60.

== Aircraft ==
Model	Image	Origin	Type	Version	Quantity	Notes
Fixed wing aircraft
CASA C-212 Aviocar		Spain Indonesia	Transport aircraft	NC212-100; NC212-220M	6	Built under licence by PTDI.
Beechcraft Premier I		United States	Utility aircraft / VIP transport	Premier-1	1	
Attack helicopter
Boeing AH-64 Apache		United States	Attack helicopter	AH-64E Apache Guardian	8	Originally known as AH-64D Apache Block III Longbow. Equipped with AN/APG-78 Longbow radar, Hydra 70 and AGM-114R3 Hellfire missiles. All delivered.
Mil Mi-35		Russia	Assault helicopter	Mi-35P Mi-35M	5 (Note: Flightglobal's World Air Forces mentioned that Indonesian Army has 7 Mi-35, although according to SIPRI and the Indonesian military itself, the Indonesian Army only have 5 Mi-35, of which 2 were delivered in 2003 and 3 were delivered in 2010.) 2	Export version of Mi-24, equipped with a side-mounted twin-barell GSh-30K 30mm fixed-position automatic cannon, 240mm rockets launchers and AT-9 Ataka anti-tank missiles, AT-6 Spiral, and SA-16, can also be equipped with PT DI's FFAR. Two Mi-35M delivered in 2026.
Transport helicopter
Bell 412		Canada Indonesia	Utility helicopter	NBell-412SP; NBell-412HP; Bell-412EP; Bell-412EPI	60	Built under license by PTDI. Air assault helicopters are armed with 7.62mm MG such as SM2 or Dillon Aero minigun.
Eurocopter Fennec		France	Utility helicopter/light attack	AS350-B3; AS550-C3 AS555-AP	6 6	Assembled locally by PTDI. Most aircraft armed with 7.62mm MG, FZ219 rocket pod or FN HMP250 gun pod.
MBB Bo 105		Indonesia	Utility helicopter/light attack	NBO-105 CB	12	Built under licence by PTDI. Most aircraft have been converted into air assault helicopters armed with rocket pod and FN HMP250 gun pod. Will be replaced with Eurocopter Fennec.
Kamov Ka-32		Russia	Transport helicopter	Ka-32T	2	
Mil Mi-8M		Russia	Transport helicopter	Mi-8AMT	2	Previously used by the Ministry of Defense for humanitarian purpose.
Mil Mi-17		Russia	Transport helicopter	Mi-17V-5	10	Most aircraft armed with 7.62mm MG. 12 Mi-17V-5 were delivered from 2008 to 2011 according to SIPRI. 3 units have crashed from 2013 to 2020. 2 Mi-17V-5 were delivered in July 2026. 1 crashed in November 2026.
Hughes 300		United States	Trainer helicopter	Hughes 300C	20	
UAV
Shield AI MQ-35 V-BAT		United States	Reconnaissance		Unknown	Used by Kopassus
Teledyne FLIR Black Hornet Nano		Norway	Reconnaissance		Unknown	
Alpha A900		Spain	Reconnaissance		Unknown	Used by the Field Artillery
Elang Laut 25		Indonesia	Reconnaissance		Unknown	Used by the Army's Directorate of Topography.

== Watercraft ==
Vehicle	Image	Origin	Type	Version	Quantity	Notes
Fast boat
KMC Komando		Indonesia	Fast boat	Base variant	13	Used for coastal transport. Originally 14, but one was lost due to an accident.
RHIB		Indonesia	Fast boat		75+	Used for coastal transport and patrol.
Rajawali RI-1-2000		Indonesia	Hovercraft		Unknown	Built by PT Bhinneka Dwi Persada for Bekangad.
Yamaha FZR Turbo Charge		Japan	Jet ski/personal watercraft		Unknown	For Bekangad.
Transport ship
ADRI-LIII class		Indonesia	Landing craft utility	2500 DWT craft	2	Under Construction by PT MOS Karimun.
ADRI-LI class		Indonesia	Landing craft utility	1500 DWT craft	2	Built by PT Daya Radar Utama.
ADRI-L class		Indonesia	Landing craft utility	1200 DWT craft	1	Built by Dok & Perkapalan Kodja Bahari (Persero).
ADRI-XLVIII class		Indonesia	Landing craft utility	1000 DWT craft	2	
ADRI-XLIV class		Indonesia	Landing craft utility	1000 DWT craft	1	
ADRI-XCII class		Indonesia	Landing craft utility	500 DWT craft	1	65m Multipurpose Disaster Relief Vessel (MDV) Built by Noathu Shipyard.

== Aircraft weaponry ==
Model	Image	Origin	Type	Notes
Air-to-air missile
9K38 Igla		Soviet Union	AAM	For Mi-35P
Anti-tank guided missile
AGM-114 Hellfire		United States	ATGM	AGM-114R3 variant for AH-64E Guardian. 143 missiles delivered.
9M120 Ataka		Soviet Union	ATGM	AT-9 Spiral-2 for Mi-35P
9K114 Shturm		Soviet Union	ATGM	AT-6 Spiral for Mi-35P
Rocket
S-8		Soviet Union	rocket	S-8KOM for Mi-35P
Hydra 70		United States	rocket	For AH-64E Guardian
FFAR		United States Indonesia	rocket	Produced by Indonesian Aerospace

== Procurement ==
=== Tank ===
==== Altay (tank) ====
100 on order

=== Planes ===
==== CASA/IPTN CN-235 ====
3 on order

==== N219 Nurtanio ====
6 on order

=== Helicopters ===
==== Sikorsky UH-60/S-70 ====
In August 2023, Indonesian Aerospace and Lockheed Martin signed an agreement for the procurement of 24 UH-60/S-70 Black Hawk helicopters. In February 2024, during the Singapore Airshow 2024, it was announced that the Ministry of Defense of the Republic of Indonesia had reduced the Black Hawk programme to 22 airframes

==== Mil Mi-8/Mi-17 ====
The Indonesian Ministry of Defense is exploring the potential acquisition of Mi-8/Mi-17 helicopters. On 24 December 2025, Secretary General of the Ministry of Defense Brig. Gen. Rico Ricardo Sirait stated that “the Indonesian Ministry of Defense is in the technical exploration and evaluation phase, including testing the helicopter platform’s suitability to support various missions, particularly humanitarian operations and disaster relief.” He added that "we need to clarify that this information cannot yet be considered a purchase or procurement contract."

== Historical equipment ==
=== Sidearms ===
- Nambu Pistol
- Luger Pistol
- Mauser C96
- Tokarev TT

=== Rifles ===
- M1 Garand
- Lee–Enfield
- Geweer M. 95
- Mosin-Nagant
- Karabiner 98k
- Type 38 rifle
- Type 99 rifle
- vz. 52 rifle
- FN Model 1949
- M1 carbine
- M14 rifle
- SKS
- SP-1/2/3

=== Submachine gun ===
- M1A1 Thompson
- M3 submachine gun
- Madsen M-50
- MP-40
- Sten Gun
- Owen gun
- Type 100 submachine gun
- MP-18
- Lanchester submachine gun
- PPSh-41
- PM1

=== Machine guns ===
- M1918 BAR
- Type 96 light machine gun
- Type 99 light machine gun
- Bren light machine gun
- Madsen machine gun
- Degtyaryov machine gun
- Type 24
- Vickers machine gun
- Type 92 heavy machine gun
- Lewis gun

=== Armoured vehicles ===
- Universal carrier
- Marmon-Herrington armoured car
- Humber armoured car
- Humber scout car
- Ford Lynx
- Panhard EBR
- BRDM-1
- BTR-152
- BTR-50
- Alvis Saladin
- Alvis Saracen
- Ferret armoured car

=== Tanks ===
- PT-76
- M3 Stuart
- M4 Sherman
  - M32A1B3
- Type 97 Te-Ke
- Type 97 Chi-Ha

=== Rocket launchers and miscellaneous ===
- Bazooka
- ENTAC
- SS.11
- M67
- M40A1
- M-56
- Ordnance QF 25-pounder
- OTO Melara Mod 56
- RM-51
- SURA-D
- Rapier
- Type 1 47 mm anti-tank gun
- Type 94 75 mm mountain gun
- Type 92 battalion gun
- Type 96 15 cm howitzer

== See also ==
- List of equipment of the Indonesian Navy
- List of equipment of the Indonesian Air Force
- List of equipment of the Indonesian National Police
- List of aircraft of the Indonesian National Armed Forces
