= List of equipment of the Indonesian National Police =

This is a list of equipment of the Indonesian National Police currently in service.

== Aircraft ==
Fixed-wing aircraft
Aircraft	Image	Origin	Role	Versions	Quantity	Notes
Boeing 737 Next Generation		United States	Transport	737-800	1	Ex-Pobeda VP-BQY. In active service.
EADS CASA C-295		Spain; Indonesia	Transport	CN-295	1	In active service.
Fokker 50		Netherlands	Transport	Fokker F27 Mark 50	1	In active service.
CASA C-212 Aviocar		Spain; Indonesia	Transport	NC-212-200	2	
PZL M28 Skytruck		Poland	STOL transport	PZL M28	4	
Beechcraft 1900		United States	Transport	1900D	2	
Hawker 400		United States	VIP transport	Raytheon Hawker 400XP	1	
Diamond DA40 Diamond Star		Austria	Trainer		2	
Helicopter
Eurocopter AS365 Dauphin		France	Utility		3	In active service.
AgustaWestland AW169		Italy	Utility		9	In active service.
AgustaWestland AW189		Italy	Utility		2	
Bell 412		Canada; Indonesia	Utility	NBell 412; NBell 412EP	3	One NBell 412 (registration number P-3001 (ex P-5001)) and two NBell 412EP (registration number P-3002 and P-3003). In active service.
Bell 429 GlobalRanger		United States	Utility		2	In active service.
MBB Bo 105		Germany; Indonesia	Utility	NBO-105	14	From 15 aircraft delivered, 1 crashed in 2022, 14 in active service.
Enstrom 480		United States	Light helicopter	480B	18	
PZL Mi-2		Poland	Utility	Mi-2 Plus	12	

== Vessels ==
Class	Picture	Units	Length	Type	Ships	Origin	Note
Type A2		5	61 – 75 meters	Patrol ship	KP Bisma (8001)	Spain	In active service by Directorate of Water police and Aviation (Polairud).
Type A2		5	61 – 75 meters	Patrol ship	KP Baladewa (8002) KP Yudistira (8003) KP Bharata (8004) KP Wisanggeni (8005)	Indonesia	In active service by Directorate of Water police and Aviation (Polairud).
Type A3		16	48,69 –55 meters	Patrol ship	KP Arjuna (7001) KP Nakula (7002) KP Sadewa (7003)	Indonesia	KP Kresna donated from Japan in 1962. In active service by Directorate of Water Police and Aviation (Polairud).
Type A3		16	48,69 –55 meters	Patrol ship	KP Kresna (7004)	Japan	KP Kresna donated from Japan in 1962. In active service by Directorate of Water Police and Aviation (Polairud).
Type A3		16	48,69 –55 meters	Patrol ship	KP Antasena (7006) KP Antareja (7007) KP Gatot Kaca (7008) KP Parikesit (7009) KP Abimanyu (7010) KP Hanoman (7011) KP Laksmana (7012) KP Wibisana (7013) KP Bima (7014) KP Prahasta (7015) KP Anggada (7016) KP Sanjaya (7017)	Indonesia	KP Kresna donated from Japan in 1962. In active service by Directorate of Water Police and Aviation (Polairud).
Type B1		2	48 meters	Patrol boat	KP Ibis (6001) KP Kasturi (6002)	Indonesia	In active service by Directorate of Water Police and Aviation (Polairud).
Type B2		17	37 meters	Patrol boat	KP Kepodang (5001) KP Jalak (5002) KP Manyar (5003) KP Cucak Rawa (5004) KP Kutilang (5005) KP Bangau (5006) KP Belibis (5007) KP Pelikan (5008) KP Punai (5009) KP Tekukur (5010) KP Pinguin (5011) KP Kakatua (5012) KP Beo (5013) KP Puyuh (5014) KP Enggano (5015) KP Gelatik (5016) KP Perenjak (5017)	Indonesia	In active service by Directorate of Water Police and Aviation (Polairud).
Type B3		8	28 – 28.5 meters.	Patrol boat	KP Anis Kembang (4001) KP Anis Macan (4002) KP Walet (4003) KP Cendrawasih (4011) KP Kolibri (4015) KP Enggang (4016) KP Balam (4017) KP Murai (4018)	Indonesia	In active service by Directorate of Water police and Aviation (Polairud).
Type C1		19	16 – 22.72 meters	Patrol boat	KP Albatros (3001) KP Eider (3002) KP Parkit (3004) KP Perkutut (3005) KP Nuri (3006) KP Kenari (3007)	Indonesia	KP Hayabusa, KP Anis Madu, and KP Taka donated from Japan in 2007. KP Gagak, KP Sikatan, and KP Pelatuk donated from Australia in 2011. In active service by Directorate of Water police and Aviation (Polairud).
Type C1		19	16 – 22.72 meters	Patrol boat	KP Hayabusa (3008) KP Anis Madu (3009) KP Taka (3010)	Japan	KP Hayabusa, KP Anis Madu, and KP Taka donated from Japan in 2007. KP Gagak, KP Sikatan, and KP Pelatuk donated from Australia in 2011. In active service by Directorate of Water police and Aviation (Polairud).
Type C1		19	16 – 22.72 meters	Patrol boat	KP Gagak (3011) KP Sikatan (3012) KP Pelatuk (3013)	Australia	KP Hayabusa, KP Anis Madu, and KP Taka donated from Japan in 2007. KP Gagak, KP Sikatan, and KP Pelatuk donated from Australia in 2011. In active service by Directorate of Water police and Aviation (Polairud).
Type C1		19	16 – 22.72 meters	Patrol boat	KP Kedidi (3015) KP Bittern (3016) KP Perkakak (3017) KP Lory (3018) KP Gajah Laut (3019) KP Pulau Pomana XXII-3017 KP Pulau Padar XXII- 3018	Indonesia	KP Hayabusa, KP Anis Madu, and KP Taka donated from Japan in 2007. KP Gagak, KP Sikatan, and KP Pelatuk donated from Australia in 2011. In active service by Directorate of Water police and Aviation (Polairud).
Type C2		10+	15 meters	Patrol boat	KP X-2001 KP. Elang Laut – 2003 KP 2004 KP 2005 KP Mandeh III-2006 KP x-2006 KP. SBU – 017 KP.XXIII-2013 KP.XXIII-2016 KP Gamkonora XXX-2014 KP Sibela XXX-2015	Indonesia	In active service by Directorate of Water police and Aviation (Polairud).
Subdit Gakkum		1		Patrol boat	Subdit Gakkum	Indonesia	In active service by Directorate of Water police and Aviation (Polairud).

== Firearms ==
Model	Image	Calibre	Type	Origin	Variant	Details
Pistols
Pindad P1		9×19mm	Semi-automatic pistol	Indonesia	P1 P2	Licensed production of the Browning Hi-Power. Approximately 30,000 P1s and 2,000 P2s manufactured.
Pindad G2		9×19mm	Semi-automatic pistol	Indonesia	G2 Combat G2 Elite	Standard issued to replace P1/P2.
MAG-4		9×19mm	Semi-automatic pistol	Indonesia	MAG-4	5,000 MAG4 procured in 2017 for patrol unit (Sabhara).
Glock		9×19mm	Semi-automatic pistol	Austria	Glock 17	
HS2000		9×19mm	Semi-automatic pistol	Croatia		
Browning High-Power		9×19mm	Semi-automatic pistol	Belgium	Mk III	
SIG Sauer P228		9×19mm	Semi-automatic pistol	Switzerland	P228	
SIG Sauer P320		9×19mm	Semi-automatic pistol	United States		
SIG Sauer Pro series		9×19mm	Semi-automatic pistol	United States	SP2022 SPC2022	
M1911		.45 ACP	Semi-automatic pistol	United States		Locally known as Pistol FN 45
S&W Model 15		.38 Special	Revolver	United States	Model 15	
S&W Model 36		.38 Special	Revolver	United States	Model 36	
Colt Official Police		.38 Special	Revolver	United States	Official Police Commando	
Colt Police Positive Special		.38 Special	Revolver	United States		
Taurus Model 82		.38 Special	Revolver	Brazil		
Shotguns
Pindad SG-1		12 gauge	Shotgun	Indonesia		Used by prison officer
Remington 870		12 gauge	Shotgun	United States		Used by Detachment 88
Kel-Tec KSG		12 gauge	Bullpup pump action shotgun	United States		Used by Brimob.
Submachine guns
Beretta M12		9×19mm	Submachine guns	Italy; Indonesia	PM1A1	Manufactured under license by Pindad as PM1.
Pindad PM2		9×19mm	Submachine guns	Indonesia	PM2-V1 PM2-V2	Standard issued.
SIG MPX		9×19mm	Submachine guns	United States	MPX	Used by Detachment 88
Heckler & Koch MP5		9×19mm	Submachine guns	Germany	MP5A2 MP5A3	Used by Brimob and Detachment 88.
CZ Scorpion Evo 3		9×19mm	Submachine guns	Czech Republic	A1	Used by Criminal Detective Unit (Resmob).
Uzi		9×19mm	Submachine guns	Israel	Mini Uzi	
Heckler and Koch MP7		4.6×30mm	Submachine gun	Germany	MP7A2	Used by Detachment 88.
Škorpion vz. 61		.32 ACP	Submachine guns	Czechoslovakia		Used by Brimob
Madsen M-50		9×19mm	Submachine guns	Denmark	M/50	Limited use by regional police
Thompson submachine gun		.45 ACP	Submachine guns	United States		Limited use. Mostly used by regional police
Assault rifles and Carbines
Pindad SS1		5.56×45mm 7.62×45mm	Assault rifle	Indonesia	SS1-V1 SB1-V1 SB1-V2	Standard issued rifle. The SB1 variants is used by Sabhara units.
Pindad SS2		5.56×45mm	Assault rifle	Indonesia	SS2-V1 SS2-V2 SS2-V5 SS2-V5 A1	Standard issued to replace SS1. SS2-V5 A1 variants used by Brimob
Heckler & Koch HK416		5.56×45mm	Assault rifle	Germany	HK416	Used by Detachment 88.
SIG MCX		5.56×45mm	Carbine	United States	MCX Virtus SBR	Used by Detachment 88, and Brimob.
SIG516		5.56×45mm	Assault Rifle	United States	SIG516 Patrol	Used by Brimob.
M4 carbine		5.56×45mm	Carbine	United States	M4A1	Used by Detachment 88.
Steyr AUG		5.56×45mm	Bullpup Assault rifle	Austria	AUG A1 AUG A2 AUG A3	Used by Brimob.
IWI Tavor		5.56×45mm	Bullpup Assault Rifle	Israel	TAR21	Used by Brimob.
AK-101		5.56×45mm	Assault rifle	Russia		Used by Brimob and Detachment 88.
AK-102		5.56×45mm	Assault rifle	Russia		Used by Brimob and Detachment 88.
M16 rifle		5.56×45mm	Assault rifle	United States	M16A1	
Norinco AK-2000P		5.56×45mm	Assault rifle	China		Used by Brimob. A Chinese copy of AK-101 produced by Norinco labeled as AK-2000P for Indonesian Police. Mostly in storage due to poor quality.
AK-47		7.62×39mm	Assault rifle	Soviet Union	AK-47 Type 2 AKS	In limited service. Mostly for training.
vz. 58		7.62×39mm	Assault rifle	Czechoslovakia		In limited service. Mostly for training. Referred to as "AK M-58"
SKS		7.62×39mm	Semi-automatic carbine	Soviet Union		In limited service. Mostly used by regional police. Also used for Ceremonial duties
Ruger Mini-14		5.56×45mm	Semi-automatic rifle	United States	Mini-14 GB	Used by regional police
M1 Carbine		.30 Carbine	Semi-automatic carbine	United States	M1	In limited service. Mostly used by regional police
Zastava M48		7.92×57mm	Bolt action carbine	Yugoslavia	M48/63	In limited service. Mostly used by regional police and for training
Jungle carbine		.303 British	Bolt action carbine	United Kingdom		Limited use. Mostly used by regional police and for training
Sniper Rifles
Pindad SPR-3		7.62×51mm	Sniper rifle	Indonesia	SPR-3	Standard issued.
M14 rifle		7.62×51mm	Designated marksman rifle	United States		Used by Brimob
ArmaLite AR-10		7.62×51mm	Designated marksman rifle	United States	AR-10T	Used by Brimob and Detachment 88
SIG Sauer SIG716		7.62×51mm	Designated marksman rifle	Germany	SIG716	Used by Brimob
Kalekalıp KMR762		7.62×51mm	Designated marksman rifle	Turkey		Used by Brimob
Remington Model 700		7.62×51mm	Bolt-action rifle	United States		
Barrett MRAD		7.62×51mm	Bolt-action rifle	United States		Used by Brimob
Steel Core Designs Cyclone		7.62×51mm	Bolt-action rifle	United Kingdom	Cyclone LSR	Used by Brimob
Steyr SSG 08		7.62×51mm	Bolt-action rifle	Austria		Used by Brimob
Pindad SPR-1		7.62×51mm	Sniper rifle	Indonesia	SPR-1	Previously standard issued before replaced by SPR-3. Reserved for training purposes.
Accuracy International Arctic Warfare		7.62×51mm	Sniper rifle	United Kingdom	AX308	Used by Brimob
Pindad SPR-2		.50 BMG	Anti-materiel rifle	Indonesia		Used by Brimob.
Machine Guns
FN Minimi		5.56×45mm	Light machine gun	Belgium; Indonesia		Locally produced as the Pindad SM3
RPD machine gun		7.62×39mm	Light machine gun	Soviet Union		Used by Brimob.
Bren light machine gun		.303 British	Light machine gun	United Kingdom	Mk III	Used by Brimob
Madsen machine gun		.30-06 Springfield	Light machine gun	Denmark		In limited service. Mostly used by regional police
FN MAG		7.62×51mm	General-purpose machine gun	Belgium; Indonesia		Locally produced as the Pindad SPM2 GPMG
PK machine gun		7.62×51mm	General-purpose machine gun	Bulgaria	Arsenal MG-M2	Used by Brimob.
M2 Browning		.50 BMG	Heavy machine gun	United States	M2HB	Used by Brimob.
Grenade Launcher
Federal Riot Gun		37 mm flare	Riot gun	United States	M201-Z	
Pindad SAR-2		38 mm	Riot gun	Indonesia		
SAGL		40×46mm grenade	Grenade launcher	Bulgaria		
M203 grenade launcher		40×46mm grenade	Grenade launcher	United States; Indonesia		Locally produced as the Pindad SPG1
GP-25		40mm VOG-25 grenade	Grenade launcher	Russia		Used by Brimob
M79 grenade launcher		40×46mm grenade	Grenade launcher	United States		
CIS 40 AGL		40mm grenade	Automatic grenade launcher	Singapore		
Non-lethal weapons
Taser X26		-	Electroshock weapon	United States	X26	Indonesian Police are set to become the third in Southeast Asia police group after Royal Malaysia Police and Singapore Police Force to use the non-lethal Taser X26 stun guns.
Anti-tank warfare
RPG-7		40mm HEAT	Rocket-propelled grenade	Bulgaria	ATGL-L	Used by Brimob for training purpose.

== See also ==
- List of equipment of the Indonesian Army
- List of equipment of the Indonesian Navy
- List of equipment of the Indonesian Air Force
- List of aircraft of the Indonesian National Armed Forces
