= Indo Defence Expo & Forum =

Biannual defence industry trade fair in Jakarta, Indonesia

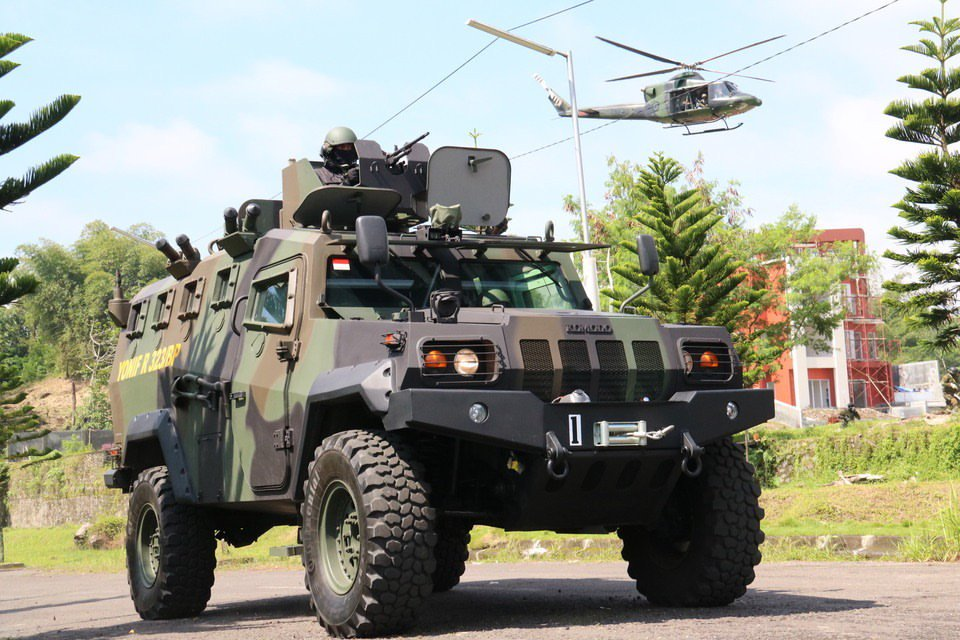
- Pindad Komodo armoured personnel carrier
- Status: Active
- Genre: Trade fair
- Frequency: Biannual
- Venue: Jakarta
- Country: Indonesia
- Years active: 2004–present
- Previous event: 11–14 June 2025
- Next event: TBD
- Organiser: Ministry of Defence
- Website: www.indodefence.com

Indo Defence Expo & Forum is a biannual arms and defence technology sales exhibition as well as promotional event for international defence and security equipment manufacturers, which has been held since 2004 at JIExpo, Jakarta, Indonesia. It is the largest exhibition of its kind in Southeast Asia and a world calendar event.

The latest military, aviation, and nautical defence and security technologies are typically showcased at the event, which also serves as a meeting point for key decision-makers from various defence authorities and companies worldwide. Defence companies from countries around the globe have participated in the exhibition. Seminars and symposiums are also arranged on the sidelines of the event to explore technology transfer among the participating countries.
