= China Precision Machinery Import-Export Corporation =

Chinese defense company

- Native name: 中国精密机械进出口总公司
- Type: State-owned
- Industry: Defense
- Founded: 1980
- Headquarters: Beijing, China
- Products: Air defense systems

China Precision Machinery Import-Export Corporation (CPMIEC, Chinese: 中国精密机械进出口总公司) is a Chinese defense company that acts as one of a number of authorized defense trading companies. It represents the domestic defense manufacturing industry in the export of arms and technology in missile and air defense systems.

== Turkish air defense system ==
In a notable announcement in September 2013, Turkey, a member of the NATO alliance, declared its intention to acquire the HQ-9 missile defense system from the company, in a deal valued at 3.44 billion US dollar. CPMIEC was selected against three other competitors. The Aster 30 missile with SAMP/T launcher from the Italo-French consortium Eurosam came second with a price tag of US$4.4 billion, the Patriot missile defense system offered by Lockheed Martin and Raytheon came third at a cost of US$5 billion and the S-300 system from the Russian Rosoboronexport fourth in the competition.

Following high level pressure by other NATO members, Turkey relented and announced giving up on the deal in November 2015. Earlier on February 20, 2015, the Turkish defense minister Ismet Yilmaz had confirmed the purchase.

== Venezuelan radar ==
In China's first major arms sale in Latin America, Venezuela in 2005 purchased JYL-1 radars from the company in a deal worth US$150 million. After this successful deal, the Venezuelan military explored buying other radars from CPMIEC and would go on to purchase aircraft from CATIC, another Chinese defense firm.

== Syrian missile development ==
The company has worked with Syrian Scientific Studies and Research Center and shipped missile components to the research institute, according to a US media report in 1996 citing the CIA.

US Treasury Sanctions

China National Precision Machinery Import/Export Corporation was included by the US Treasury Department's Office of Foreign Asset Control (OFAC) in its Sanction SDN List, which denotes a list of "Specially Designated Nationals and Blocked Persons" with "Strong" Category and are subject to Secondary Sanction. The list included entities associated or linked to the company such as CPMIEC, CHINA NATIONAL PRECISION MACHINERY I/E CORP., ZHONGGUO JINGMI JIXIE JINCHUKOU ZONGGONGSI, and CHINA PRECISION MACHINERY IMPORT/EXPORT CORPORATION. The listing includes not only their location in China but worldwide.
