= Pindad Komodo =

Indonesian armored vehicle

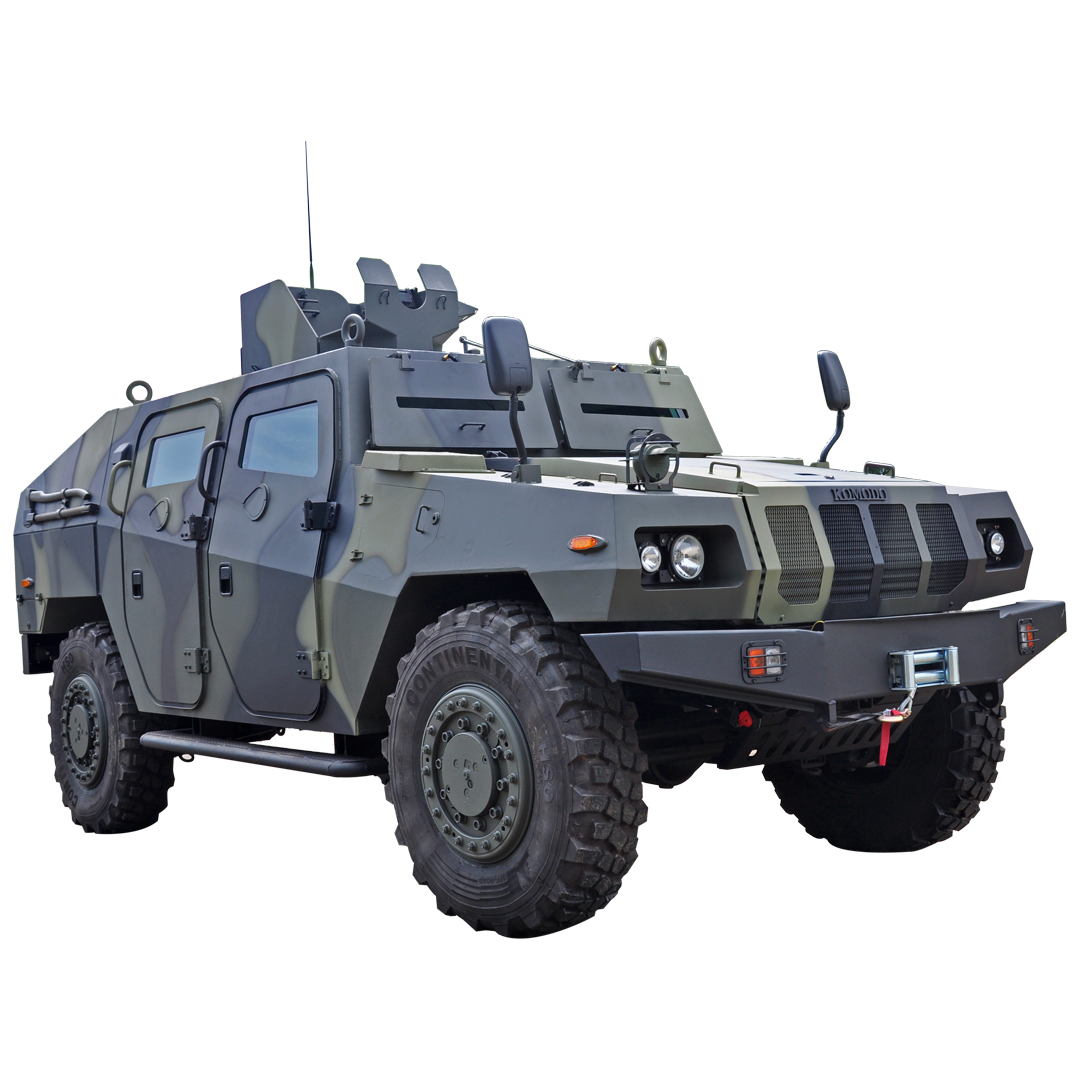
- Pindad Komodo Recon version
- Type: Armored car
- Place of origin: Indonesia

Service history
- In service: 2012 – present
- Used by: See Users
- Wars: Stabilization Mission in the Democratic Republic of the Congo

Production history
- Designer: Pindad
- Designed: October 2011 – March 2012
- Manufacturer: Pindad
- Unit cost: USD250,000 to USD300,000
- Produced: November 2012 – present
- Variants: See Variants

Specifications
- Mass: 5,800 kilograms (12,800 lb) (Empty); 7,300 kilograms (16,100 lb) (Combat)
- Length: 5,650 mm (222.4 in)
- Width: 2,250 mm (88.6 in)
- Height: 2,150 mm (84.6 in)
- Crew: 2 (driver and gunner), additional passengers depending on the variant.
- Armor: Bulletproof steel and glass
- Main armament: 12.7 mm HMG or 7.62 mm GPMG
- Secondary armament: Depends on variant
- Engine: Diesel; 200 PS (197 hp; 147 kW)
- Power/weight: 29.4 hp/t (30 PS/t; 22 kW/t)
- Transmission: Manual (6 Forward and 1 Reverse)
- Suspension: Rigid Axle; Front (Bushing Arm with coil Spring); Rear (Trailing Arm with Coil Spring), Stabilizer Bar; Telescopic Shock Absorber
- Ground clearance: 440 mm (17.3 in)
- Fuel capacity: 200 L (52.8 U.S. gal; 44.0 imp gal)
- Operational range: 450 km (280 mi)
- Maximum speed: 80 kilometres per hour (50 mph) (Maximum, flat); 50 kilometres per hour (31 mph) (Maximum, offroad); 100 kilometres per hour (62 mph) (Maximum, highway)

The Pindad Komodo is a 4x4 light armored car developed and produced by Pindad. The vehicle was developed after Indonesian president Susilo Bambang Yudhoyono made a visit to Pindad's main office and asked them to create an indigenous tactical vehicle in order to serve the needs of the Indonesian police and military as an alternative to other 4x4 tactical vehicles such as the Humvee as a personal challenge to the company. The vehicle was given its present name by President Yudhoyono after it was unveiled to the public at the 2012 Indo Defence Expo and Forum in Jakarta, Indonesia so that the Komodo can have a strong impression "in any combat field and could bring glory for Indonesia", especially since the Komodo dragon is an endemic animal native to Indonesia.

Its design features are made similar to the Renault Sherpa Light Scout family, which is also used by Indonesia. The Komodo's external designs also resembles the Humvee.

The Komodo tactical vehicles are slowly being adopted into Indonesian police and military service, which started after the vehicles made their public debut at Indodefence 2012. Production of these vehicles is seen to be a major shift by Pindad to move into the protected mobility domain in a cost-effective manner by the government by producing the Komodo on Indonesian soil.

== History ==
The creation of the Komodo first started on 26 October 2011, when President Yudhoyono personally visited a PT Indonesian Aerospace weapon system exhibition. During his visit, he gave a challenge to Pindad's Product Development Team to make an indigenous 4×4 tactical vehicle. Pindad's Special Vehicle Division technicians bore the responsibility to make the said vehicle. In the course of developing the vehicle, Pindad looked at other armored tactical vehicles that were being produced and sold such as the Armored Multi-Purpose Vehicle, the Nexter Aravis and the Sherpa Light family. During the visit, PT Pindad president Adik Aviantono Sudarsono was told to prepare on the production process of the vehicle when President Yudhoyono requested Pindad to have a working prototype ready in two months after his visit. Production of the Komodo was based at Pindad's factory in Bandung, West Java. The creation of a working Komodo prototype was completed in March 2012.

The Komodo made its first appearance when Pindad demonstrated the tactical vehicle to several visitors at the RITech Expo in September 2012, showing the Komodo alongside the Anoa and other Pindad-made small arms to the public. Production on a working Komodo by Pindad started on October 5, 2012. On November 10, 2012, President Yudhoyono gave the name Komodo to Pindad's new tactical vehicle at the Indo Defence 2012 Expo & Forum, Jakarta International Expo, Kemayoran, Jakarta. He was asked to give the tactical vehicle a name as a formality when he was a guest in Indodefence 2012. The naming of the vehicle was because the Komodo dragon symbolises Indonesia as a whole. President Yudhoyono was accompanied during the naming ceremony by various officials including Defence Minister Purnomo Yusgiantoro, Deputy Defence Minister Sjafrie, Police Chief General Timur Pradopo, Armed Forces Commander Admiral Agus Suhartono, Vice Governor of Jakarta Tjahaja Basuki Purnama and other high-ranking officials. A production plan of at least 240 Komodo tactical vehicles was planned after it was unveiled in Indodefence 2012.

The Komodo was also unveiled to visitors who were from the Royal College of Defence Studies when they visited Pindad manufacturing facilities during official visits. The vehicle was presented to Indonesian and Singaporean military personnel at the Weaponry System Display and Practice Assistance Latma Safkar Indopura 24/2012 from 21 to 28 November 2012. The Komodo was shown to the public at the 2013 Indonesian National Armed Force Leadership Meeting exhibition at Cilangkap.

Pindad has been awarded at the BUMN Award 2013 by the Indonesian government for their contribution in making the Komodo, since 80% of its components are being made locally. Pindad has reported confirmation that there are unnamed countries that are very interested to purchase Komodo tactical vehicles. Pindad has said that possible exports can be done for ASEAN member nations who wish to buy the Komodos. Defence Minister Purnomo Yusgiantoro, from Merdeka Palace, said that the production of the Komodo is a stepping stone that would eventually lead to the development of a tactical vehicle industry in Indonesia.

Pindad obtained a loan of 300–700 million Rupiah from the State Capital Participation or Penyertaan Modal Negara to assist in covering the costs of producing the Komodos. The company has been given a deadline of 10 years by the government to repay the loan made from PMN funds. Pindad said that they would be able to repay the loan as soon as possible.

== Design ==
The establishment of Law Number 16/2012 allowed Pindad to create the Komodo to their advantage, in which the law stipulates Indonesia to have local content used in the manufacturing of its defence products with international cooperation. The Komodo was designed in Pindad's Bandung, West Java manufacturing facility with a price tag of about US$300,000. According to Pindad, the Komodo's monocoque armored body is bulletproof and it can withstand 7.62 mm or lower calibre rifle and handgun bullets. The Komodo's glass is also made bulletproof. The Komodo's turbo intercooler diesel engine has a total horsepower of 215 PS (212 hp; 158 kW) at 2500 rpm, allowing the vehicle to achieve the weight ratio of around 30 horsepower per tonne (30 PS/t; 22 kW/t).

The Komodo can carry up to 200 litres (52.8 US gal; 44.0 imp gal) of diesel fuel. The vehicle only has a manual transmission system, which consists of 6 forward and 1 reverse gear, allowing the Komodo to have off-road capabilities. President Avianto said that the normal cruising range of the Komodo is at 450 kilometres (280 mi), with an average speed of 70 kilometres per hour (43 mph). The Komodo's off-road capabilities have been tested in various conditions ranging from mountainous terrain to mud and sand.

While most parts of the Komodo are made locally in Indonesia such as the frame, body and design, Pindad has publicly stated that they used imported components such as Hino for machinery parts and Michelin for the tyres. Its diesel engines were imported directly from Renault.

The Komodo's monocoque steel body was made locally by Krakatau Steel. The Indonesian Army's Research and Development Department or Dislitbang TNI AD has officially certified the Komodo as a road worthy vehicle after Pindad conducted static and dynamic tests.

Pindad collaborated with MBDA to create the mobile anti-aircraft SAM variant, which are armed with Mistral SAM missiles. According to the Indonesian military, a total of 56 mobile SAM units are to be made and purchased. Pindad also collaborated with Nexter to create Komodos that would serves as mobile command and communications vehicles with a total of 51 units being ordered. The Komodos can be modified by Pindad on the request of their customers in order to suit their own requirements, depending on the circumstances.

In Indo Defence 2016, Saab has entered into an agreement with Pindad to work on a Komodo anti-aircraft variant that will use the RBS 70 NG missile system and Giraffe 1X AESA radar.

On 1 June 2018, Pindad announced that it has entered into a partnership with Bhukhanvala Industries to research and develop a ceramic-based protection system for the Komodo. From the certification carried out by the Ministry of Industry and PT Surveyor Indonesia, it is known that Komodo has a TKDN (Tingkat Komponen Dalam Negeri — Domestic Component Level) of 40.86 to 40.91%.

== Operational history ==
A total of 14 units of Komodo have been handed over by Pindad since last June 2018 and departed for Democratic Republic of the Congo in November with 850 soldiers who served in MONUSCO. The Komodo that were handed over by Pindad consisted of 12 troop transport (APC) variants, 1 Command version, and 1 Ambulance unit.

== Variants ==
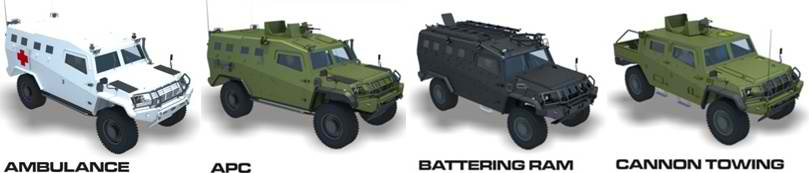
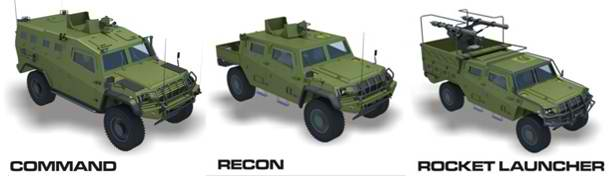
These are models being offered by Pindad as official Komodo variants.

Variants of the Komodo are offered by Pindad with the following being officially marketed to its customers:

- Ambulance
- Armoured personnel carrier / APC
- Battering ram
- Command and Communications
- Cannon Towing
- Mobile SAM launcher Mistral
- Recon
- Mortar: A mortar variant was in testing stages as of November 2018.
- 25/30mm autocannon: A turreted variant with 25/30 mm autocannon is demonstrated in Indo Defence 2018, using Cockerill CPWS Generation 2 turret and equipped with 2 slots for ATGM.

== Users ==
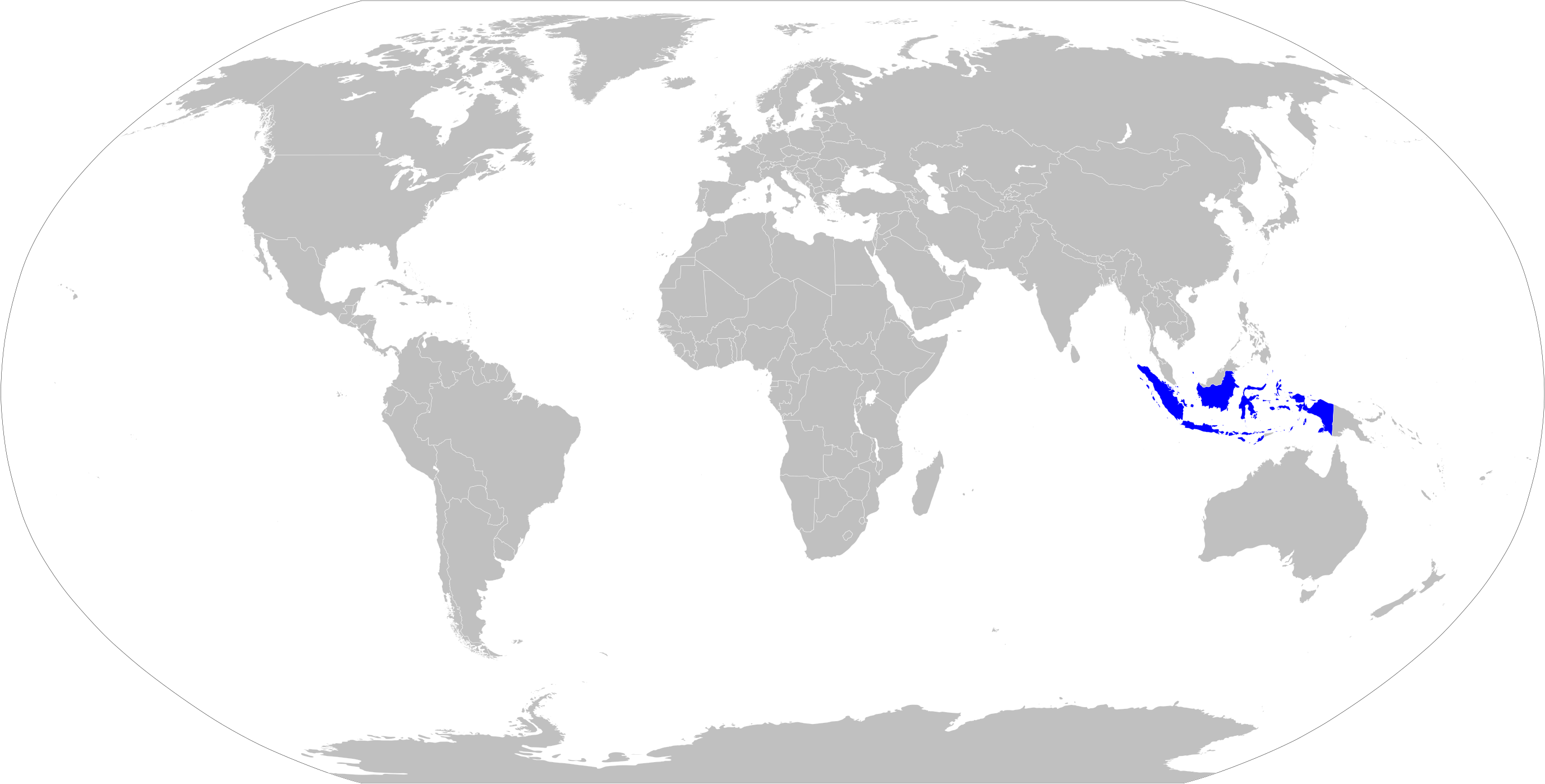
Map with Pindad Komodo operators in blue

=== Current ===
- Indonesia: The following are equipped/scheduled to be equipped with the Komodo:
  - The Indonesian Army has officially ordered 6 Komodos. The Mistral Mobile SAM launcher variant is also scheduled for orders with the Indonesian Army with a total of 56 Komodos, scheduled to be fully delivered by 2015. An additional fifty Komodos are ordered from Pindad. 8 Komodos modified to house communications equipments were also ordered. In 2019, another 51 Komodos were ordered by the army.
  - Kopassus has ordered an unknown number of Komodos modified for anti-terrorist missions, which includes the capability of ramming into brick walls measuring up to 30 centimetres. These will be used by SAT-81 Gultor in anti-terrorist operations. Tender Indonesia has publicly reported that an additional 10 Komodos were ordered for the same variant. In addition, they are equipped with electronic and communications equipment with tactical ladders as well as other special operations equipment.
  - The Mobile Brigade has ordered 2 Komodo APCs. These are to be customised for "Jungle Warfare" operations, which includes missions in urban and jungle areas. The Mobile Brigade has placed an additional order of 10 Komodos. They will have metal grilles installed on all windows due to their involvement in BRIMOB operations, which includes the suppression of violent demonstrations and riots.

=== Potential ===
- Ghana: Ghana's defence minister Dominic Nitiwul said in December 2019 that the Ghanaian government was interested in purchasing the Komodo.
- Malaysia: In November 2018, Malaysian Defense Minister Mohamad Sabu expressed interest in purchasing the Komodo.
- Philippines: On 29 February 2020, it was announced that the Philippines is interested in potentially purchasing Komodos.

== See also ==
- Renault Sherpa Light Scout family
