= Pindad SPR =

- Type: Sniper rifle Anti-materiel rifle (SPR-2)
- Place of origin: Indonesia

Service history
- In service: 2003–present
- Used by: See Users
- Wars: Insurgency in Aceh; Papua conflict

Production history
- Designer: Pindad
- Designed: 2000–present
- Manufacturer: Pindad
- Unit cost: SPR-2: IDR 300 million (US$22,128.00 as of 2017); SPR-3: IDR 148,330,000 (US$12,000 as of 2014)
- Variants: See Variants

Specifications
- Mass: SPR-2: 19.5 kg (43 lb); SPR-3: 6.94 kg (15.3 lb)
- Length: SPR-2: 1,755 mm (69.1 in); SPR-3: 1,250 mm (49 in)
- Barrel length: SPR-2: 1,055 mm (41.5 in); SPR-3: 660 mm (26 in)
- Cartridge: 7.62 mm (SPR-1 and SPR-3); 12.7 mm (SPR-2); 8.6 mm (SPR-4)
- Caliber: 7.62×51mm NATO (SPR-1 and SPR-3); .50 BMG (SPR-2); .338 Lapua Magnum (SPR-4)
- Action: Bolt-action
- Muzzle velocity: SPR-2: 900 m/s (3,000 ft/s); SPR-3: 810 m/s (2,700 ft/s)
- Effective firing range: SPR-1: 900 m (980 yd); SPR-2: 2,000 m (2,200 yd); SPR-3: 900 m (980 yd); SPR-4: 1,500 m (1,600 yd)
- Feed system: Single shot (SPR-1); 5 round detachable box magazine (SPR-2, SPR-4); 10 round detachable box magazine (SPR-3)
- Sights: optical sights, can be attached on upper receiver

The Pindad SPR (abbreviation from Indonesian: Senapan Penembak Runduk, Sniper Rifle) is a family of sniper rifles made by Pindad. The gun allows the shooter to adjust the height of the position and stability by regulating the bipod of the rifle located on the bottom front of the handguard.

The SPR is available in four variants. The SPR-1 and SPR-3 are chambered for the 7.62×51mm NATO cartridge, the SPR-2 is chambered for the .50 BMG cartridge and the SPR-4 is chambered for the .338 Lapua Magnum cartridge.

== History ==
Pindad SPR-1 was developed from 2000 and pressed into service in 2003 due to arms embargoes, as the Indonesian military was deployed into anti-insurgency operations against GAM during Insurgency in Aceh.

The SPR-2 was publicly shown in 2007 to visitors, including Vice President Jusuf Kalla. The SPR-3 introduced in 2010 to replace the SPR-1.

The SPR-4 was unveiled by Pindad in October 2017 when the company announced it alongside the production of a new ammunition facility with a loan granted by Penyertaan Modal Negara or State Capital Participation to VIPs, including President Jokowi. It is being marketed to India in cooperation with Bhukhanvala Industries to market it for future contracts to the Indian military and law enforcement agencies as of June 1, 2018.

== Variants ==
=== SPR-1 ===
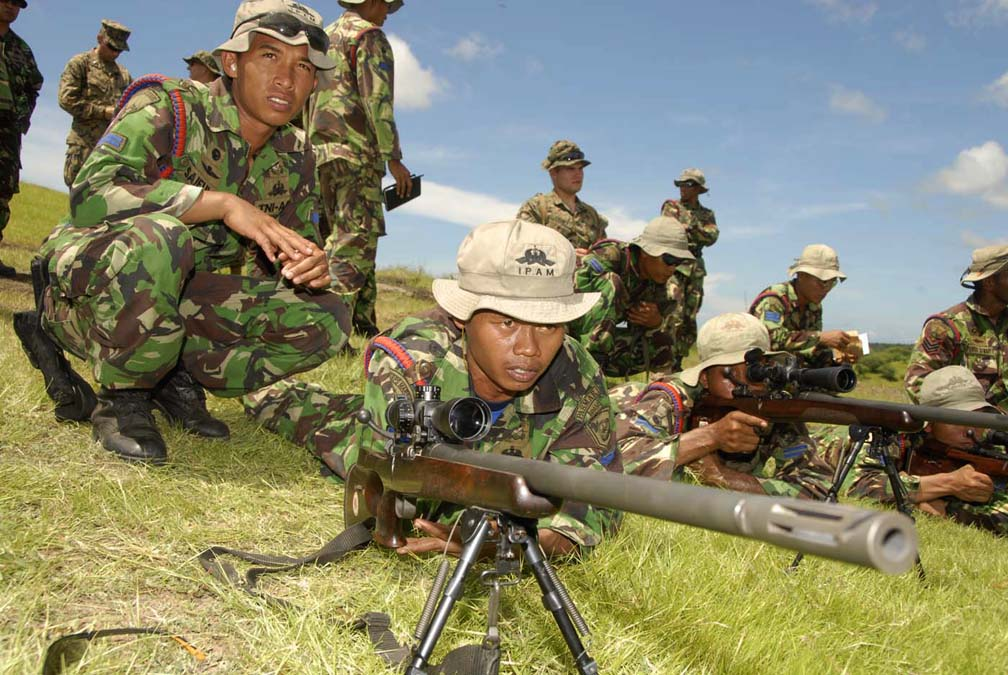
SPR-1 used by Indonesian Marines during live-fire exercise with US Marines at Karang Tekok, East Java, 11 March 2008.

The SPR-1 is a single-shot sniper rifle chambered for the 7.62×51mm NATO cartridge. Referred to as a "Precision Tactical Rifle" by Pindad, the SPR-1 is in fact essentially a well-made version of a locally available hunting rifle, brought to Indonesian military/police sniper standards since 2003.

It is confirmed in the book of Prabu Kresna di Pindad (2006) published by PT Pindad that SPR-1 operating system is similar to the Mauser SP 66 rifle, using a short-throw bolt action system. The only slight difference is the magazine capacity. While the Mauser SP 66 has a three-round magazine, the SPR-1 only holds one round (one shot). Changes from the original rifle include the addition of a Harris-type bipod adjustable for height and cant, the addition of an adjustable cheekpiece for the standard thumbhole stock, and a rail for the mounting of various scope rings.

=== SPR-2 ===
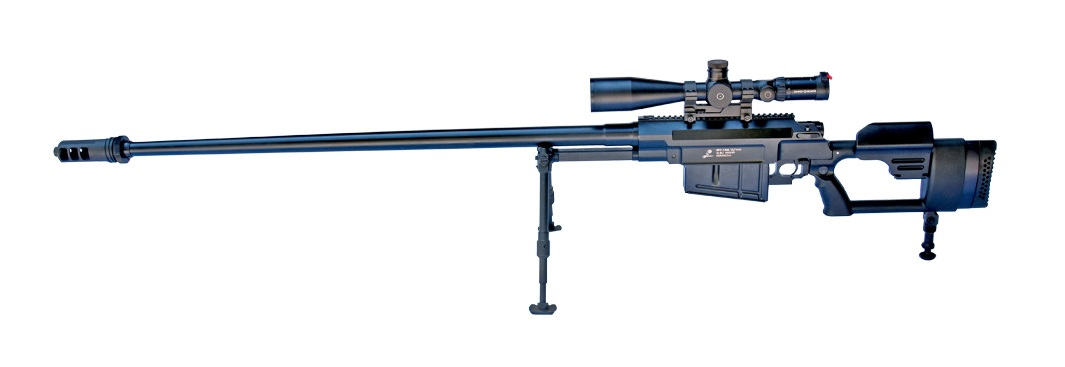
SPR-2

The SPR-2 is a .50 BMG anti-materiel rifle which is fed from a 5-round box magazine. It has a range of 2,000 meters (2 kilometers) and it can be equipped with a suppressor. The SPR-2 can be used to penetrate steel plating for up to 2 centimeters. It was first revealed in 2007.

The weapon has a foldable carry handle, which is used to carry it in case of short distance. The SPR-2 has a picatinny rail on the upper receiver to allow the easy installation of any optics with a foldable monopod on the stock.

Its design appears to be based on the Zastava M93.

=== SPR-3 ===
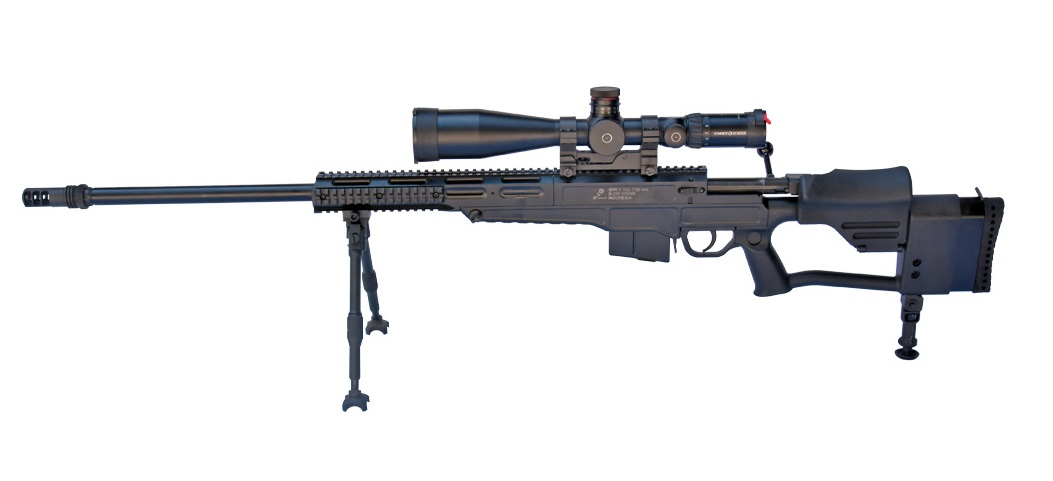
SPR-3

The SPR-3 is a magazine-fed variant of the SPR-1, chambered in 7.62×51mm NATO ammo. It was developed to replace the SPR-1 in Indonesian service. The SPR-3 was introduced in 2010 after development of the rifle was done from 2007. The rifle was shown to the public in 2011 at the APSDEX convention. Its known in the Indonesian military as the "Blue Angel".

The weapon is designed with a skeleton stock that has a foldable monopod with a free-floating barrel and a large multi-slot muzzle broke. Its design was based on the SPR-2. Changes from the first prototype rifles include the buttstock, front grip and the rod attachment for the bipod.

With a suppressor installed, the SPR-3 can be fired from up to 500 meters if subsonic ammunition is used.

=== SPR-4 ===
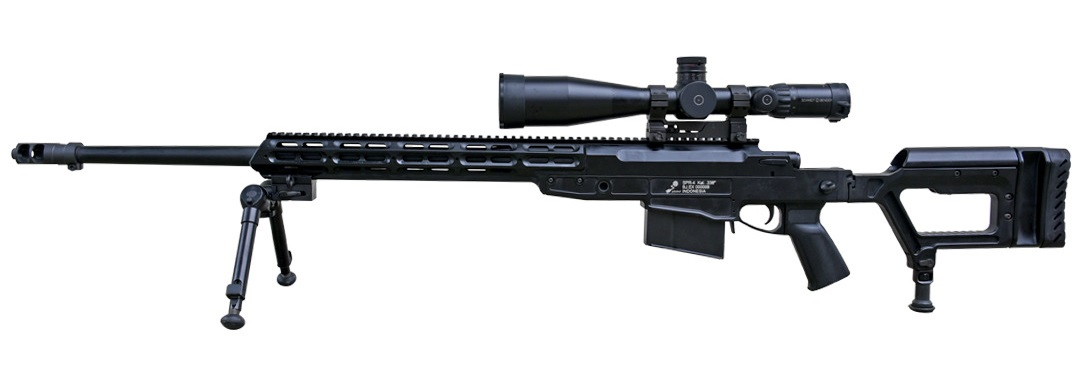
SPR-4

The SPR-4 is a .338 Lapua Magnum magazine-fed sniper rifle. It has an effective range of 1500 meters, which serve to fulfill firepower gaps between the SPR-1/SPR-3 and SPR-2. It has a capacity of five rounds.

It was first introduced by the company in October 2017.

== Users ==
- Bangladesh: Used by Bangladesh Armed Forces.
- Fiji: Exported SPR-2s to Fiji.
- Indonesia: SPR-2s/3s used by the TNI. 150 SPR-2s known to be used by Kopassus forces.

=== Future ===
- Laos: Laos has expressed an interest to acquire SPR-2s in a potential contract in a meeting between Pindad representatives and Laotian officials on September 21, 2017.

== Gallery ==
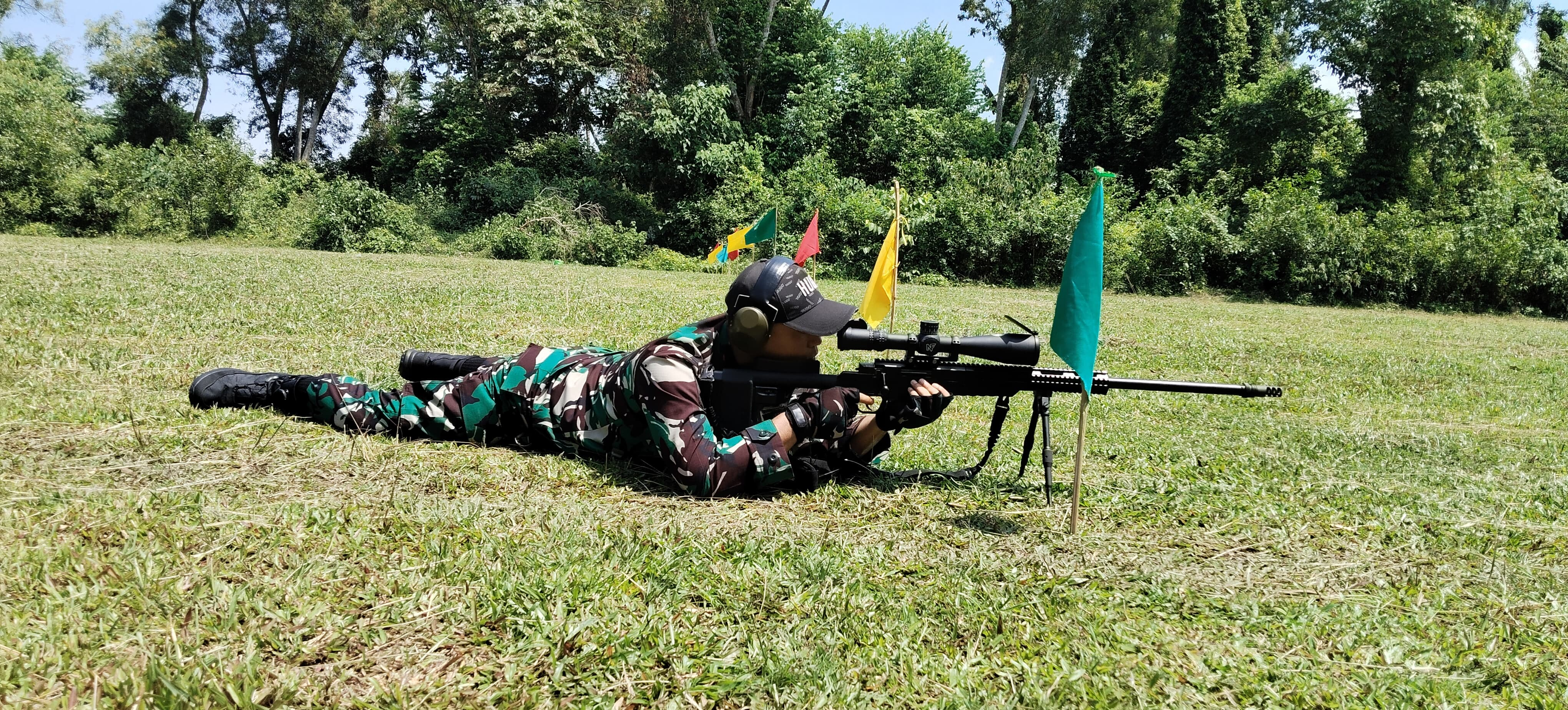
An Indonesian Marine sights on an SPR-3 during marksmanship training at the Sutanto Shooting Range of the 8th Marine Battalion, North Sumatra, 24 July 2025.
