= Ruger SR-556 =

Model of AR-15 style semi-automatic rifle

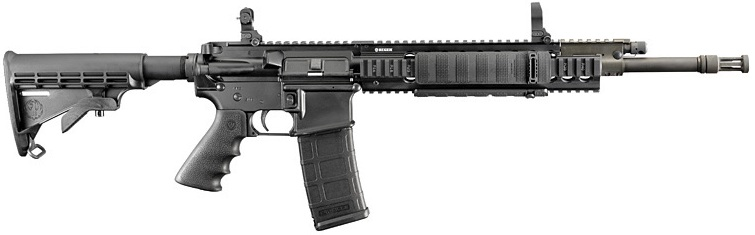
- Ruger SR-556 - Standard Configuration (discontinued)
- Type: Semi-automatic rifle
- Place of origin: United States

Production history
- Designed: 2009
- Manufacturer: Sturm, Ruger & Co.
- Produced: 2009–2018
- Variants: SR-556 (standard); SR-556C (carbine); SR-556U (6.8 SPC); SR-556E (essential); SR-556VT (Varmint/Target); SR-556TD (Takedown); SR-762 (7.62/308)

Specifications (Standard)
- Mass: 3.60 kg (7.94 lb)
- Length: 832 mm (32.75 in) (collapsed); 910 mm (36 in) (extended)
- Barrel length: 409 mm (16.12 in)
- Width: 64 mm (2.5 in)
- Height: 197 mm (7.75 in)
- Cartridge: 5.56×45mm NATO/.223 Remington.300 AAC Blackout (Aftermarket barrel); 6.8mm Remington SPC.308 Winchester/7.62×51mm NATO (SR-762 only)
- Barrels: 16 in (0.41 m)
- Action: Gas-operated short-stroke piston, rotating bolt
- Rate of fire: Cyclic rate of fire: 800 rounds/min Practical rate of fire: *Semi-automatic: 100 rounds/min *Full-automatic: 250 rounds/min
- Muzzle velocity: 945 m/s (3,100 ft/s)
- Effective firing range: 800 m (870 yd)
- Maximum firing range: 1,000 m (1,100 yd)
- Feed system: 30-round STANAG magazine or 40-round box magazine
- Sights: Iron sights

The SR-556 was a semi-automatic AR-15 style rifle manufactured by Sturm, Ruger & Co. The rifle was introduced in 2009 in .223 Remington/5.56×45mm NATO and as a .308 Winchester AR-10 variant in 2013, the SR-762. It is one of several AR-15 rifles to use a gas piston operation.

== History ==
Ruger announced on May 15, 2009, on the SR-556 being produced. On May 13, 2010, the SR-556C was announced.

In January 2016, Ruger discontinued all SR-556 rifles and introduced a new takedown variant, known as the Ruger SR-556 Takedown, with a lightweight KeyMod handguard in 2017.

== Design ==
The rifle features a short-stroke piston mechanism as opposed to the semi-direct impingement system of the AR-15. Gas flow is controlled by a four position regulator. Several key parts, such as the gas piston, gas regulator, and bolt/carrier group are chrome plated. The bolt carrier features an integral lug in place of the AR-15's gas key. The flash suppressor is similar to Ruger's AC-556 and Mini-14GB.

The 5.56 rifle includes a number of other manufacturer's parts such as a Troy Industries railed handguard and Samson folding iron sights, a Hogue rubberized pistol grip, and three Magpul PMAG 30-round STANAG magazines. The 7.62 variant uses SR-25 pattern magazines. The SR-556SC comes with three 10-round magazines and does not have the flash hider or collapsible stock, making it compliant in several states with restrictive rifle laws. The barrel is 409 mm (16.12 in), chrome lined, and features a six groove, right hand, 1:230 mm (9 in) twist.

In August 2010, Ruger announced that the rifle would be offered in the 6.8mm Remington SPC cartridge.

== Criticism ==
Ruger's introduction of the SR-556 was met with some criticism for its high price tag of around US$2,000. Ruger products are usually known for affordability, but the SR-556 is essentially a regular AR-15, but with a piston operated gas system instead of the standard direct impingement system . It differs from the less expensive alternatives like the Smith & Wesson M&P15 Sport and Sport II model rifles, of which the original Sport model lacked a forward assist and dust cover. The SR-556 was also criticized for being heavier than other AR-15s.

Ruger addressed these shortcomings by introducing a lighter and less expensive rifle, the SR-556E.

== Gallery ==
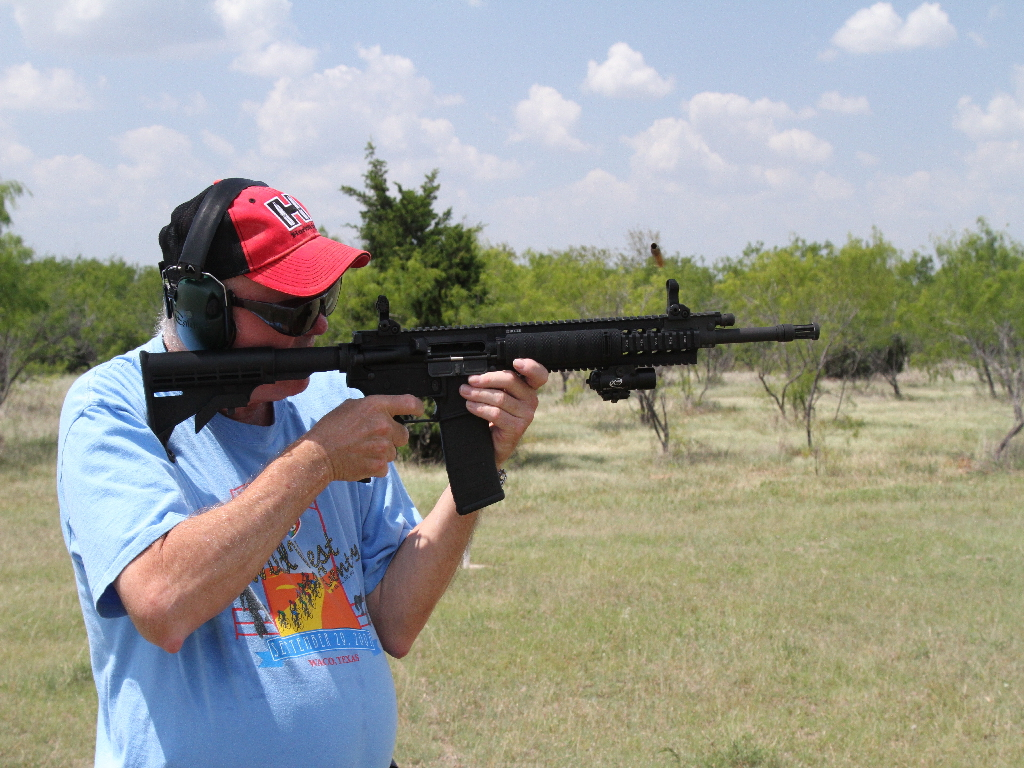
Firing the Ruger SR-556

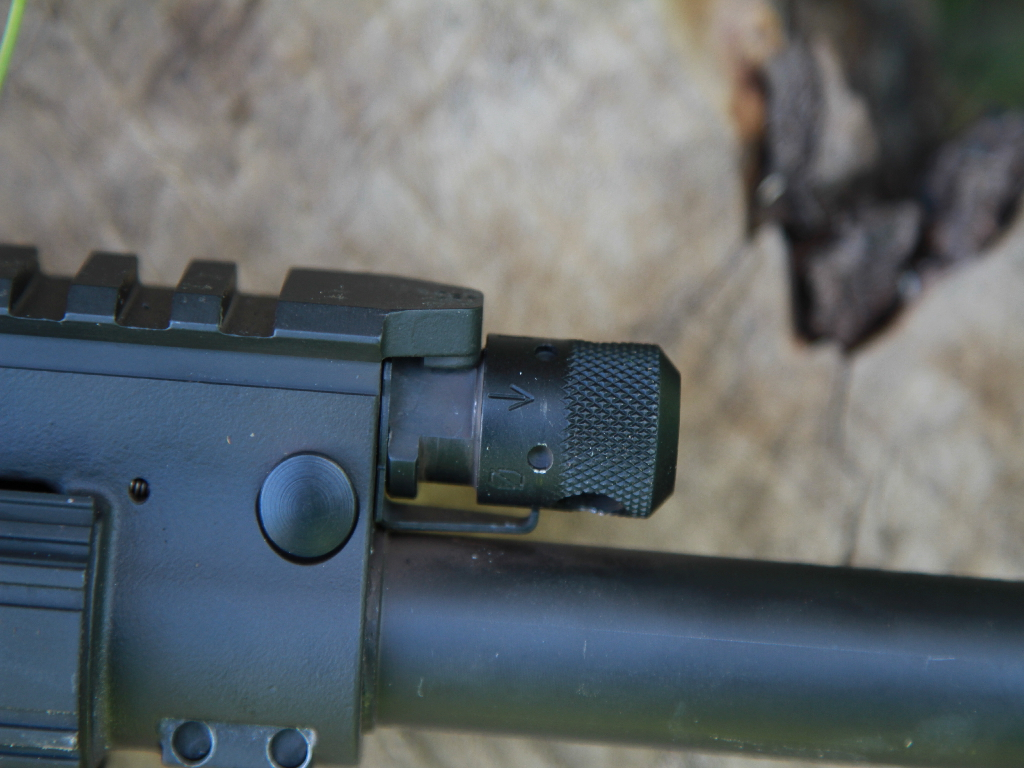
Adjustable gas key on Ruger SR-556 piston rifle

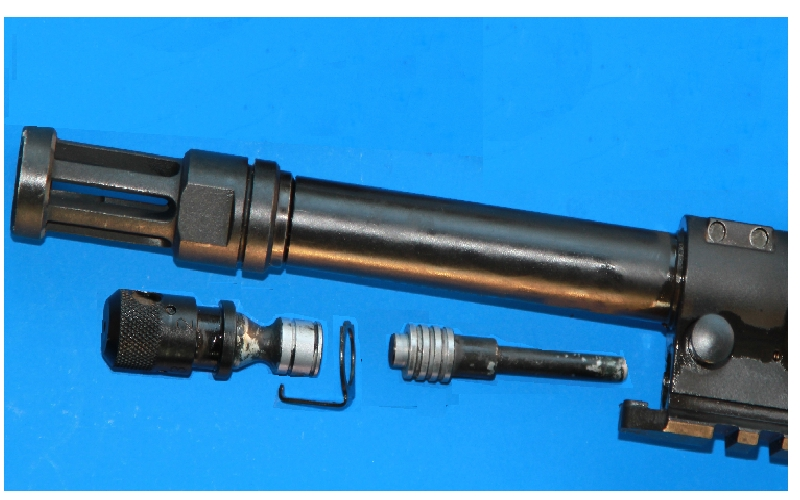
Elements of Ruger SR-556 gas system

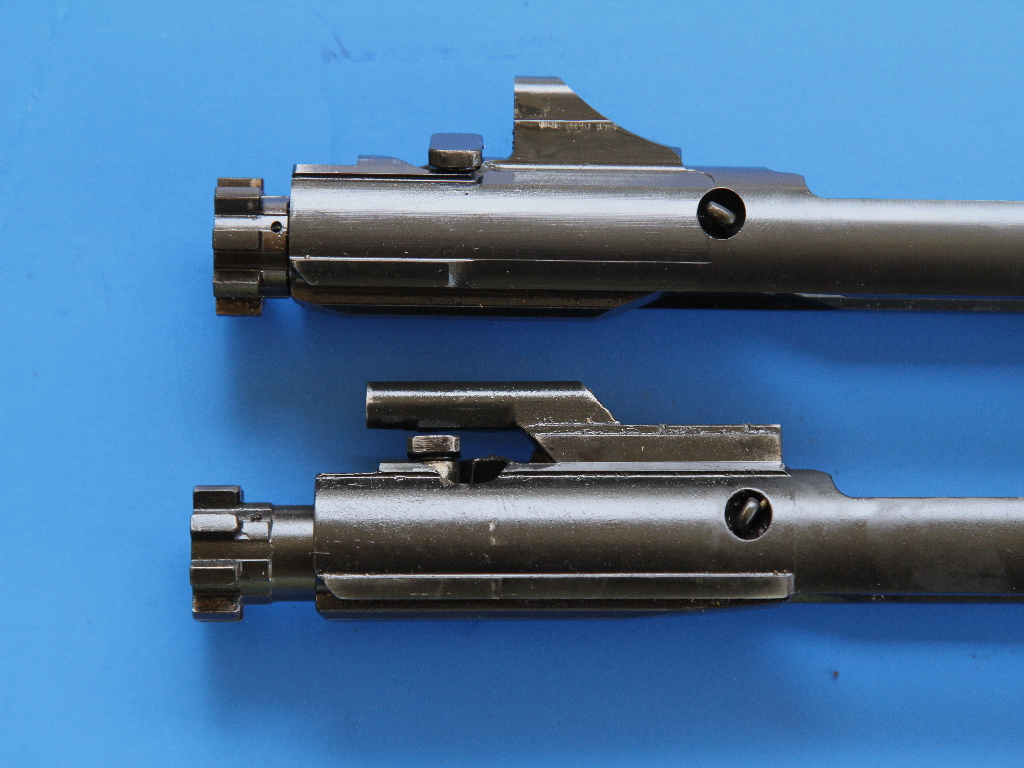
Top: Bolt and carrier for Ruger SR-556 gas piston rifle
Lower: Bolt and carrier for direct impingement AR 15 Rifle.
