= 2023 Lewiston shootings =

Spree shooting in Maine, U.S.

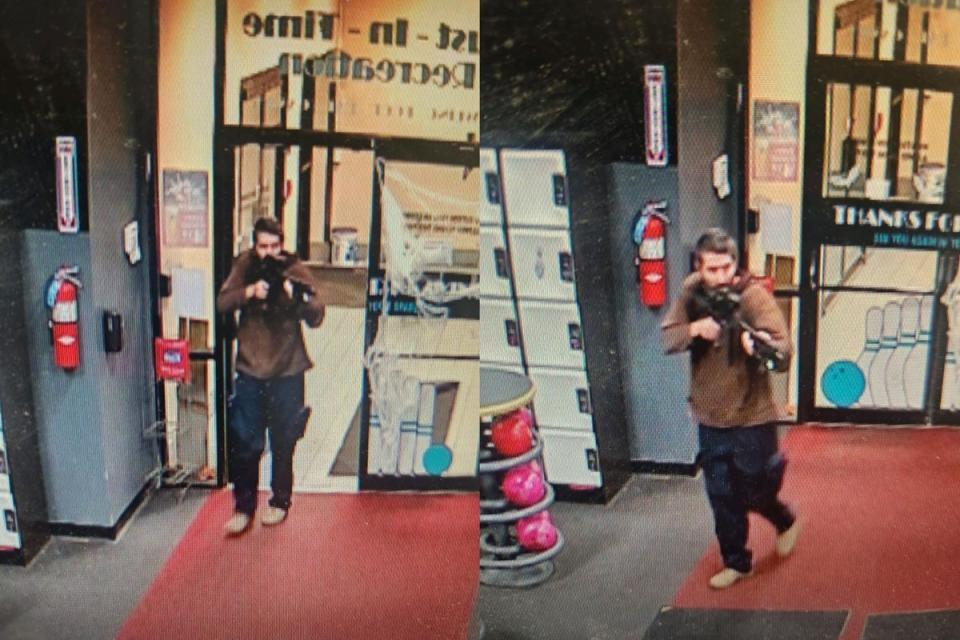
- CCTV stills of Card inside Just-In-Time Recreation, released by the Androscoggin County Sheriff's Office
- Location: Lewiston, Maine, U.S.
- Date: October 25, 2023 (3 years ago); 6:54 – 7:08 p.m. (EDT; UTC-04:00)
- Attack type: Mass shooting; mass murder; spree shooting; murder–suicide
- Weapons: Ruger SFAR .308 semi-automatic rifle; Smith & Wesson M&P .40-caliber semi-automatic pistol; Smith & Wesson M&P15 .223-caliber semi-automatic rifle (unused)
- Deaths: 19 (including the perpetrator)
- Injuries: 27 (13 by gunfire)
- Perpetrator: Robert Russell Card II
- Motive: Unknown (possibly mental illness, hallucinations or delusions related to traumatic brain injuries)

On October 25, 2023, 40-year-old Robert Card carried out a spree shooting in Lewiston, Maine, United States, killing 18 people and wounding 13 others. The initial attack occurred at the Just-In-Time Recreation bowling alley during a youth league event, followed shortly by a second shooting at the Schemengees Bar & Grille Restaurant. Following these events, Card escaped, prompting the Androscoggin Sheriff's Office to release his photograph identifying him as the suspect and the Maine State Police to initiate a homicide investigation and the most extensive manhunt in state history.

Forty-nine hours later, on October 27, Maine State Police discovered Card dead from a self-inflicted gunshot wound. His body was in a tractor-trailer near a recycling center in Lisbon, Maine, where he had been recently employed. Examination of Card's brain tissue revealed that he had traumatic brain injuries likely attributable to his eight years as a grenade instructor, when he was exposed to repeated blasts. The shooting is the tenth-deadliest in U.S. history and the deadliest in the history of Maine.

== Events ==
=== Just-In-Time Recreation shooting ===
The first shooting occurred on October 25, 2023, at Just-In-Time Recreation, a bowling alley in Lewiston, Maine, during a youth league event. The perpetrator, 40-year-old Robert Card, used a Ruger SFAR semi-automatic rifle chambered in a .308 Winchester equipped with an extended magazine, a flashlight, and an optic. At 6:54:20 p.m., Card entered the building and fired a single shot before the rifle jammed. As Card attempted to clear the malfunction, two league bowlers, Jason Walker and Michael Deslauriers II, charged at him in an effort to disarm him. Card successfully cleared the jam, loaded a new magazine, and killed Walker and Deslauriers. He then fired several additional shots at other patrons. The entire incident lasted 45 seconds from the moment Card entered the building until he departed.

Police received the initial emergency call at 6:55:31 p.m. EDT, which was followed by a series of additional calls. Plainclothes officers at a nearby shooting range also heard the gunfire and responded; the first officers arrived on the scene within four minutes of the initial call. Card killed eight people and injured three others at the bowling alley, firing 18 rounds.

=== Schemengees Bar & Grille shooting ===
The second shooting occurred shortly after at Schemengees Bar & Grille, located approximately 4 miles (6.4 km) south of the bowling alley. Card entered the building at 7:07:34 p.m. and opened fire as he moved toward the cornhole section. Bar manager Joseph Walker was fatally shot while attempting to intervene with a butcher knife. During the shooting, a patron cut the power to the building while Card was reloading; law enforcement later said this action likely saved numerous lives. Card fired additional shots before exiting through a side door six seconds after the power was cut. Within 78 seconds, Card fired 36 rounds inside and outside the business. Police arrived at the scene two minutes after the first emergency calls from the location were placed. Ten people were killed at this location, and ten others were injured.

In total, Card discharged his .308 rifle 54 times during the shootings.

The Central Maine Medical Center coordinated with local area hospitals to take in victims. Several were taken to the Maine Medical Center in Portland, the largest hospital in the state.

=== Manhunt ===
At 8:00 p.m., the Androscoggin County Sheriff's Office and the Maine State Police alerted residents of an active shooter. The sheriff's office also released images of Card inside the bowling alley with a "high-powered assault-style rifle", as well as an image of his 2013 Subaru Outback, warning residents that the shooter was "armed and dangerous".

Three hours after the shooting, police in Lisbon, a small town 8 miles (13 km) southeast of Lewiston, found Card's abandoned vehicle at a boat launch along the Androscoggin River. The Federal Bureau of Investigation (FBI), the Bureau of Alcohol, Tobacco, Firearms and Explosives (ATF), and the Federal Protective Service (FPS) assisted local authorities.

On October 26, the Maine State Police and Governor Janet Mills confirmed the number of victims and announced that an arrest warrant was issued for the suspect, who was charged with eight counts of murder. Police surrounded a house in Bowdoin while executing a search warrant.

On October 27, Michael Sauschuck, public safety commissioner of Maine, said that police were using dive teams, sonar, and remotely operated underwater vehicles (ROVs) to search for underwater activity near where Card's vehicle was found in Lisbon. Sauschuck said they did not definitively know Card's means of escape. That same day, the shelter-in-place order in Lewiston was rescinded, but hunting restrictions in Bowdoin, Lewiston, Lisbon, and Monmouth were imposed.

At 7:45 p.m. on October 27, Card was found dead near his former place of employment, a recycling center close to the Androscoggin River in Lisbon. The recycling center had been searched the night before, but his body was found in a box truck on a part of the land that had not been searched previously. The manner of death was suicide and the cause of death was a gunshot wound to the head fired from his handgun; the Maine Chief Medical Examiner's autopsy revealed he had likely died 8 to 12 hours before being found.

The hunting restrictions that had been put in place were subsequently removed.

== Victims ==
List of deaths

- Ronald Morin, 55
- Peyton Brewer-Ross, 40
- Joshua Seal, 36
- Bryan MacFarlane, 41
- Joseph Walker, 57
- Arthur Strout, 42
- Maxx Hathaway, 35
- Stephen Vozzella, 45
- Thomas Conrad, 34
- Michael Deslauriers II, 51
- Jason Walker, 51
- Tricia Asselin, 53
- William Young, 44
- Aaron Young, 14
- Robert Violette, 76
- Lucille Violette, 73
- William Brackett, 48
- Keith Macneir, 64

In total, 18 people were killed, and 27 others were injured, 13 by gunfire and 14 during the subsequent panic. Seven people, including six men and one woman, were killed at Just-In-Time Recreation. Eight men were killed at Schemengees Bar & Grille. Three other victims died at a hospital after arrival. Four of those killed at Schemengees were deaf and had been participating in a cornhole tournament for the deaf community. Ranging in age from 14 to 76, the victims were all identified on October 27. Of the 18 fatalities, 16 were male.

== Reactions ==
=== Local and state ===
Lewiston mayor Carl Sheline said that he was "heartbroken". Jason Levesque, mayor of Auburn, Lewiston's twin city, added "we will get this situation settled." Maine Governor Janet Mills urged residents to follow law enforcement instructions. Nirav Shah, former head of the Maine Center for Disease Control and currently the deputy director of the federal Centers for Disease Control and Prevention, offered his condolences for Joshua Seal, a victim who had been employed under Shah as an American Sign Language interpreter for the deaf during the COVID-19 pandemic. Similar condolences were offered by Karen Hopkins, director of the Maine Education Center for the Deaf and Hard of Hearing, as three of the victims killed were graduates of the center.

=== Federal ===
U.S. Senator Angus King of Maine wrote on Twitter that he was "deeply sad". Fellow Senator Susan Collins remarked, "This is the darkest day in Maine history in my lifetime." Jared Golden—who represents Lewiston—and Chellie Pingree, both U.S. Representatives from Maine, released statements expressing shock at the events. Following the shooting, Golden further announced his support for an assault weapons ban, reversing his previous opposition to gun control measures and asked for "forgiveness" from the community and victims' families for his previous position. On October 25, President Joe Biden made calls to several Maine lawmakers to offer full federal support. On October 26, he ordered that U.S. flags be lowered to half-staff for five days as "a mark of respect for the victims of the senseless acts of violence perpetrated in Lewiston, Maine". In a later statement, Biden urged lawmakers to impose an assault weapons ban and introduce more gun regulations, saying it is "not normal, and we cannot accept it" and that current safety measures are "simply not enough".

== Perpetrator ==
Robert Russell Card II (April 4, 1983 – October 27, 2023) was a longtime resident of Bowdoin, Maine. He was identified by the police on October 25, 2023, as a person of interest and was designated a suspect the next day. Card was a sergeant first class in the United States Army Reserve, enlisting in December 2002. For the next 12 years, he served as a petroleum supply specialist. In 2014, he joined a training unit with 3rd Battalion, 304th Infantry Regiment in Saco, Maine. He served there for eight years, until 2022, as an instructor training West Point cadets in the use of hand grenades. He had no overseas or combat deployments.

Growing up, Card attended Bowdoin Central School and later Mount Ararat High School in nearby Topsham. After graduating in 2001, he studied engineering at the University of Maine from 2001 to 2004, but did not complete his education. Card was known for his quiet and friendly demeanor, and for much of his life was dependable and did not cause trouble, according to his family. Before 2023, his only recorded interactions with law enforcement were a 2007 arrest for DUI, to which he pleaded guilty, and two speeding charges, in 2001 and 2002.

=== Mental health decline and subsequent concerns ===
In 2022, Card's hearing began to deteriorate, which his family noticed was accompanied by a change in his demeanor, which became more sullen and short-tempered. By the spring of 2023, he started to believe that people at a local market and the bar where he enjoyed playing cornhole were gossiping about him and labeling him a pedophile. He also experienced significant weight loss.

In May 2023, Card's son and ex-wife reported his declining mental health to a Sagadahoc County sheriff's deputy, associating his reports of auditory hallucinations to being fitted for hearing aids in February 2023. In July 2023, leaders of Card's unit (3rd Battalion, 304th Infantry Regiment) made a report to law enforcement about Card's alarming comments and erratic behavior while training at Camp Smith (close to the U.S. Military Academy at West Point, New York). The Army Reserve specifically told law enforcement that he threatened to "shoot up" a military base in Saco, Maine. He was removed from training exercises, and the New York State Police responded and transported Card to West Point's Keller Army Community Hospital for psychological evaluation. He received two weeks of additional treatment at the Four Winds Psychiatric Hospital in Katonah, New York. Doctors prescribed lithium but did not assess Card for a traumatic brain injury, according to his sister. After leaving the hospital, he discontinued the medication.

Card returned home on August 3, 2023, and the Army barred him from handling guns or ammunition, deeming him a "non-deployable" serviceman. That same day, a gun shop in Auburn, Maine, denied his access to purchase a silencer because he responded "yes" to the question "Have you ever been adjudicated as a mental defective OR ever been committed to a mental institution?" on the ATF Form 4473. In the subsequent months, Card had several angry and violent episodes. On one occasion, his mother found him crying on her front porch due to his delusions of being talked about. He also left his job as a recycling truck driver.

In mid-September 2023, the Army Reserve requested that the Sagadahoc County Sheriff's Department conduct a well-being check on Card after he punched a fellow reservist who asked him to stop talking about "shooting up places and people". Card did not answer the door but could be heard moving inside his trailer home by the sheriff's deputy outside. Because Card was described by his commanders as a top marksman, the deputy requested backup from the Kennebec County Sheriff's Department, about 45 minutes away, and wrote in a report that "due to being in a very disadvantageous position we decided to back away".

According to a police affidavit, Card's family members indicated Card believed he was being broadcast as a pedophile online by businesses and people including Just-In-Time, Schemengees, and a manager at Schemengees, who was one of the eight victims there that night.

=== Brain damage findings ===
At the request of the Maine Chief Medical Examiner's office, a sample of Card's brain tissue was examined at Boston University's CTE Center. The findings, released by Card's family, showed profound brain damage, including missing white matter; white matter with "moderately severe" damage; "disorganized clumps" of myelin (fatty sheaths surrounding axons); damage to axons; and scarring and inflammation throughout the brain. Although the tissue did not show evidence of chronic traumatic encephalopathy (CTE), it did confirm that Card had traumatic brain injury that resembled the brain damage in veterans exposed to blasts. Despite never seeing combat, Card's role as a grenade instructor would have exposed him to thousands of blasts over the eight years he served. However, because he never deployed, the military never tested him for symptoms of brain injury. (Such testing is standard practice for all soldiers deployed to war zones.) Neurologist Ann McKee, the director of the CTE Center, stated: "These findings align with our previous studies on the effects of blast injury in humans and experimental models. While I cannot say with certainty that these pathological findings underlie Mr. Card's behavioral changes in the last 10 months of life, based on our previous work, brain injury likely played a role in his symptoms."

== Aftermath ==
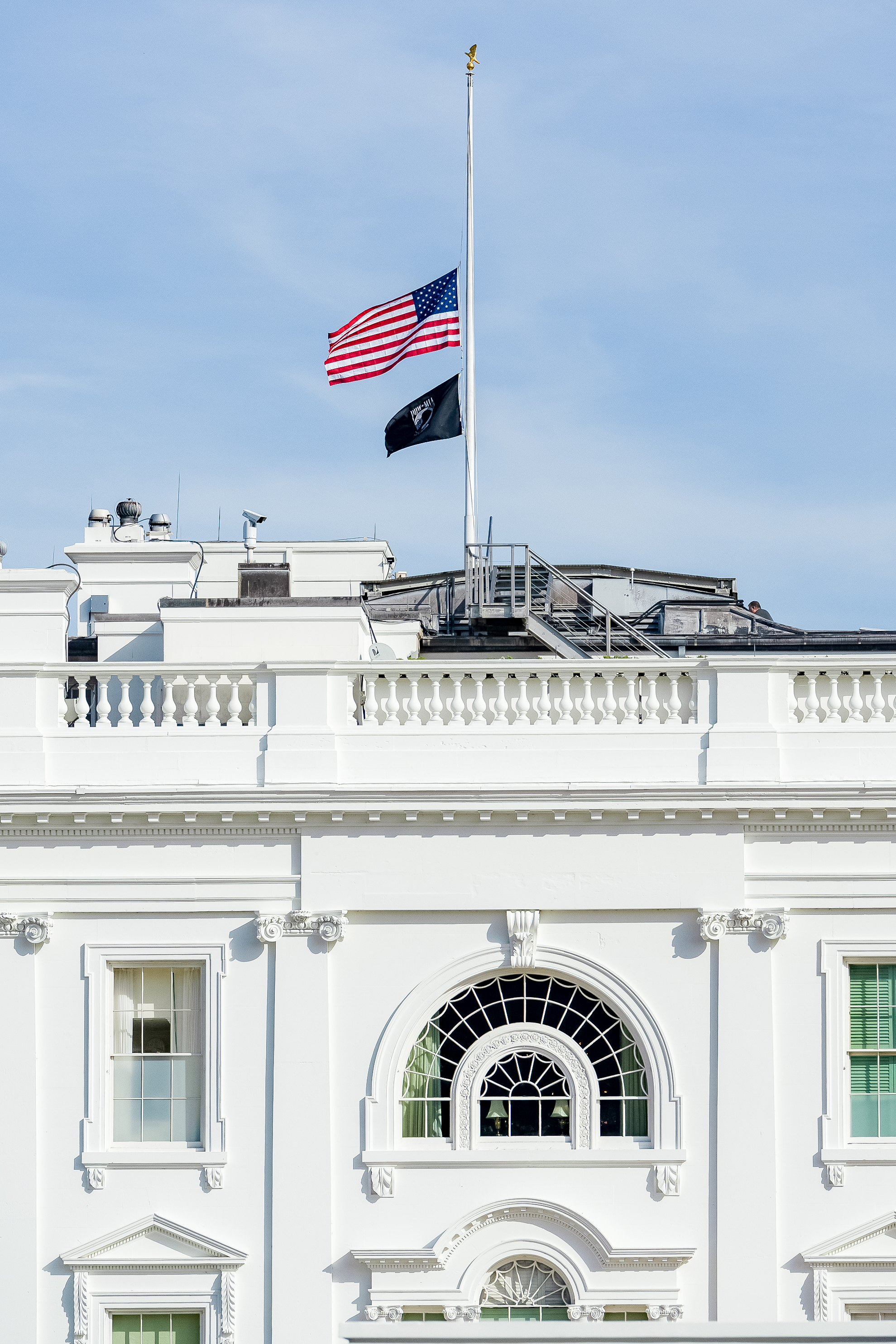
Flag above the White House flies at half staff following mass shootings in Lewiston, Maine on Thursday, October 26, 2023

Following the shootings, a shelter-in-place order was implemented in Lewiston, and schools were placed on lockdown, along with schools across the southern Maine area. Auburn issued its own shelter-in-place order and told businesses to lock down as well. Classes at schools in the Lewiston Public Schools district, Central Maine Community College, and Bates College were canceled on October 26, as well as several additional school districts within a 50-mile radius. The shelter-in-place advisory was extended to Bowdoin on October 26. Bates College also postponed its presidential inauguration, previously scheduled for October 27, until further notice. Additionally, extra security measures were taken along the Canada–United States border following an "armed and dangerous" alert issued by the Canada Border Services Agency.

Shortly after the shooting, there was an increase in the number of individuals within the state looking to purchase a weapon. A gun store owner told reporters that he had done more business the day after the shooting than he had in the prior month. Although deer season was scheduled to start the Saturday after the shooting, he believed most of the sales were safety-related. Prospective buyers allegedly waited in line for over an hour at one gun store.

=== Social media ===
In the days after the shootings, multiple outlets reported on Card's use of social media prior to the shootings. Card had used Twitter to like and retweet far-right extremist views, including transphobic views by right-wing figures like Tucker Carlson and Donald Trump Jr.

According to Wired, right after the shooting, social media platforms such as TikTok, Facebook, and Twitter were flooded with disinformation about Card. This included false claims that he had been arrested and was no longer at large. Some stated inaccurately, based on information about someone else with the same name, that Card was arrested in 2016 for possessing and disseminating sexually explicit materials.

=== Lawsuit ===
During a press conference held in October 2024, victims who had hired lawyers from the Berman & Simmons, Gideon Asen, Koskoff, and National Trial Law law firms—who were collectively representing 100 clients—announced their intention to file a tort complaint under the Federal Tort Claims Act in order to begin the process. On September 3, 2025, the lawsuit was filed against the Department of Defense, the U.S. Army, and Keller Community Army Hospital for criminal negligence for failing to respond to Card's mental illness.

According to the lawsuit, before Card committed the mass shooting, the Army did little to address his worsening mental condition. According to the lawsuit, the Army knew about mass violence, so Card's threats were predictable, yet it did nothing when it realized his unstable behavior and declining mental health. Cynthia Young feels that the Army's inaction cost them everything because her husband and son were killed in the incident.

Following a 2023 audit of the Army that found the Army neglected to make required reports of violent threats by service members, such as the shooter, about 50% of the time, attorneys refiled and amended a lawsuit to include the report from the U.S. Department of Defense. The Defense Department's assessment, which claims that the lack of protocol raised the likelihood of violence in the community, including the mass shooting in Maine, supports the accusations even more. The attorneys expect the Army will tighten up training and take action to guarantee protocols are followed. The public operations duty officer for the Defense Department, however, chose not to comment on ongoing legal proceedings.

In February 2026, the federal government asked that the court dismiss the lawsuit brought against the government, claiming that Robert Card was at fault and that the victims were not protected by the government from the shooter's act. Sovereign immunity was also maintained by the federal government. According to attorney Travis Brennan, his team responds by opposing the motion, but the court makes the final decision.

=== Findings of independent commission ===
Maine Governor Janet Mills established an independent commission to investigate the shooting. The seven-member commission, chaired by Daniel Wathen, reviewed thousands of pages of documents, gathered facts from many witnesses, and held public meetings. In August 2024, the commission issued a 215-page final report, announced at Lewiston City Hall. The report concluded that both police and the Army Reserve missed opportunities to prevent the tragedy. The report found that Card's behavior provided sufficient evidence for the local sheriff's office to have obtained a "yellow flag" order to seize Card's guns in September 2023, yet failed to do so. The report also concluded that the Army Reserves failed to provide appropriate healthcare for Card or to remove his access to weapons, even after a reservist sent a text message to an Army supervisor, saying, "I believe he [Card]'s going to snap and do a mass shooting."

== See also ==
- 2023 Bowdoin–Yarmouth shootings, which occurred in Maine in April 2023
- List of mass shootings in the United States in 2023
- List of filmed mass shootings
- List of disasters in Maine by death toll
