= Remington Model R-25 =

- Type: Hunting rifle
- Place of origin: United States

Production history
- Manufacturer: Remington Arms
- Produced: Circa 2012

Specifications
- Mass: 7.75 lb (3.52 kg)
- Length: 38.25 in (97.2 cm)
- Barrel length: 20 in (51 cm)
- Cartridge: .243 Winchester; 7mm-08 Remington; .308 Winchester
- Action: Semi-automatic
- Feed system: 4-round SR-25 pattern magazine

The Remington Model R-25 is a semi-automatic gas-operated rifle manufactured by DPMS for Remington Arms. The R-25 is Remington's attempt to join the AR market. It features a free-floating Chrom-Moly fluted barrel and is modeled after the classic AR-10. It has no built-in iron sights and instead has a Picatinny rail mounted atop the receiver to allow the user to mount their choice of scope or other sighting systems. The R-25 is advertised primarily as a hunting rifle, and as such normally comes painted in Mossy Oak camouflage.
