= Smith & Wesson M&P10 =

- Type: Semi-automatic rifle
- Place of origin: United States

Production history
- Manufacturer: Smith & Wesson
- Produced: 2013–present

Specifications
- Mass: 3.50 kg (7.71 lb); 4.11 kg (9.05 lb) Performance Center variant
- Length: 955 mm (37.6 in) collapsed 1,039 mm (40.9 in) extended 1,003 mm (39.5 in) Performance Center variant
- Barrel length: 457 mm (18 in); 508 mm (20 in) Performance Center variant
- Cartridge: .308 Winchester/7.62×51mm NATO; 6.5mm Creedmoor Performance Center variant
- Action: Direct impingement
- Feed system: 10-round detachable SR-25 pattern box magazine

The Smith & Wesson M&P10 is a Smith & Wesson AR-10 Styled semiautomatic long rifle.

== Design details ==
The M&P10 series of rifles is based on the AR-10. Smith & Wesson offers the M&P10 semi-automatic rifles in a variety of configurations tailored to specific shooting applications and styles. The standard model has a six-position collapsible stock, 4140 steel barrel, 7075 T6 aluminum receiver and a hard-coat black anodized finish.

== Variants ==
In 2013, the M&P10 line was expanded to include the .308 Winchester calibre. Unveiled at 2013 SHOT Show, the rifle is available in several variants; the M&P10 (CA Compliant), M&P10 (Compliant), and the M&P10 CAMO are chambered in .308 Winchester.

- M&P10 CA Compliant: features a California Bullet Button, making it compliant for sale to civilians in California.
- M&P10 Compliant: features a fixed extended stock and non-threaded barrel, making it compliant for sale to civilians in Maryland, New Jersey, and New York. It was available in Massachusetts until the Attorney General, Maura Healy, issued a unilateral ban of it and all AR type rifles.
- M&P10 CAMO: features a Magpul Original Equipment rifle stock and hunter's camouflage finish on the receiver, handguard, and pistol grip.
- M&P10 Performance Center: chambered in 6.5mm Creedmoor, features a 20” barrel, Threaded Muzzle with Thread Protector, Two-Stage Match Trigger, Magpul Original Equipment rifle stock, 15” Free-Float Troy® M-LOK® handguard, 2” Aluminum M-LOK® Accessory Rail Panel and Magpul pistol grip.

== See also ==
- Smith & Wesson M&P15
- Ruger SR-762
