= BCL 102 =

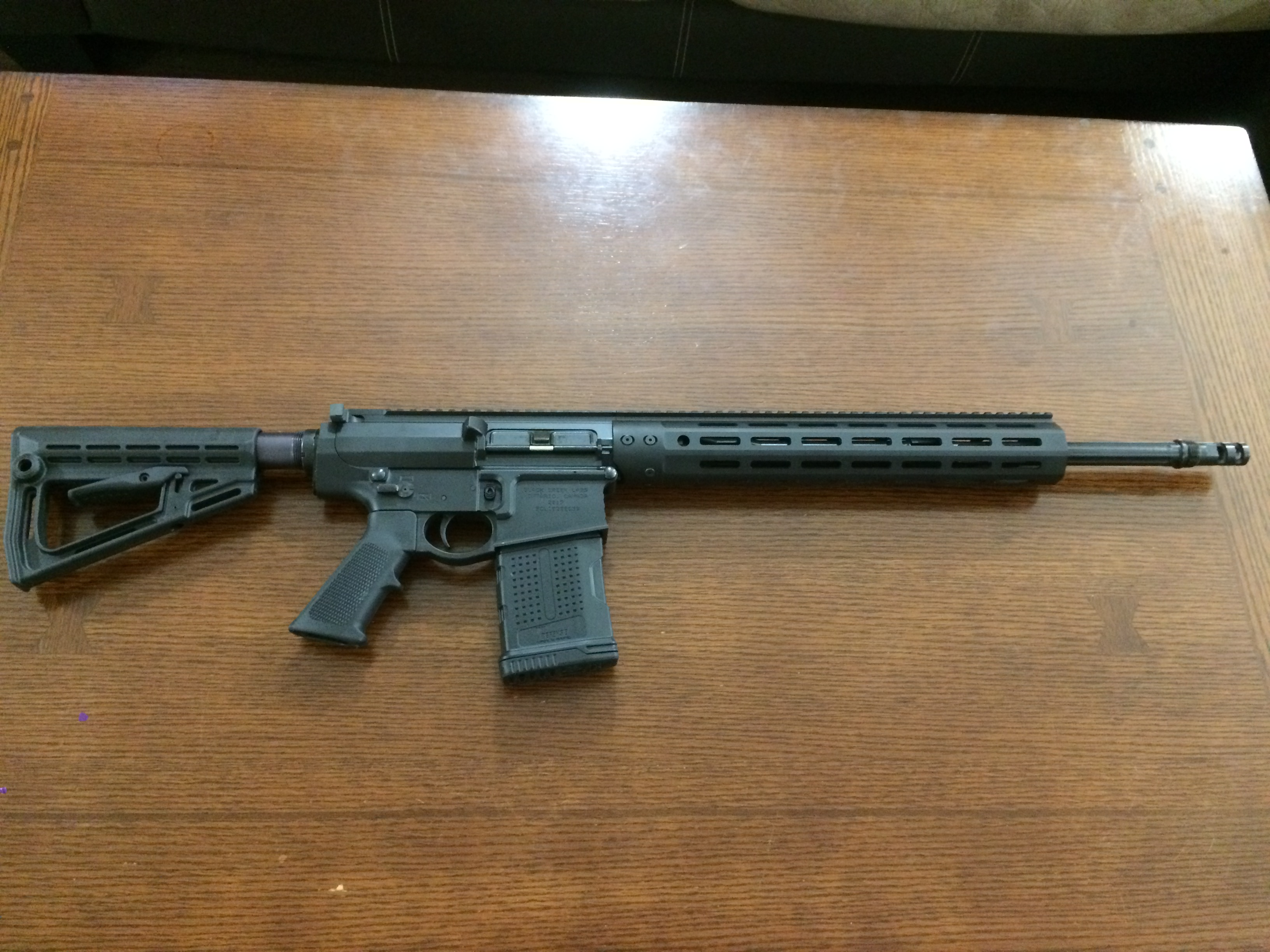
- BCL 102 (Wave 1)
- Type: Semi-automatic rifle
- Place of origin: Canada

Service history
- In service: N/A

Production history
- Designer: Black Creek Labs
- Designed: 7
- Manufacturer: Black Creek Labs (BCL)
- No. built: 300+
- Variants: MK7, MK7X

Specifications
- Barrel length: 18.6 inches (470 mm) (standard)
- Cartridge: .308 Winchester; 7.62×51mm NATO; 6.5mm Creedmoor
- Action: Direct impingement
- Effective firing range: ≈800 metres (870 yd)
- Feed system: 5-, 10-, 20- & 30-round STANAG magazines
- Sights: Picatinny rails, which allows the use of various scopes and sighting devices

The BCL 102 is a Canadian-made semi-automatic rifle made by BCL.

== History ==
BCL introduced the BCL 102 in 2017. This rifle reportedly takes its roots from the NEA102, which was its former name.

=== First Gen ===
Circa Aug 2017. First public release with collaboration with North Eastern Arms.

=== Second Gen ===
Circa Dec 2017. Changes from the first wave include: ambidextrous bolt release, redesigned upper receiver, redesigned brass deflector, redesigned BCL logo, redesigned bolt catch, addition of a trigger guard lowering gate, and flared magazine well, the charging handle was replaced by an ambidextrous in-house model. The stock was also changed to a "Captain Hook" style. The barrel nut now has lightening holes in it.

This generation was still designed and produced under the management of North Eastern Arms. Customers reportedly were having common extraction and ejection issues with their firearm.

=== Third Generation ===
Circa Summer 2018. Black Creek takes over all manufacturing and design from North Eastern Arms to rectify the consistent problems of extraction and ejection.

BCL released a public recall statement in March 2019:

"It has been determined that a previous extractor recall did not completely solve the issue, so further investigation, testing and evaluation was required and is now completed. It is now understood that any 102s with extraction or ejection issues should contact warranty support for an “extraction/ejection repair kit.” Kits may vary based on individual symptoms, but at minimum, the kit will include a new generation extractor and a new set of “made in Canada” gas rings developed and manufactured specifically for the 102."

Customers claim that the repair kit resolved their issues with extraction and ejection.

=== Fourth Generation ===
The BCL 102 Mk 7 was released in 2020.

== Features ==
=== Operating mechanism ===
The rifle action operates on a direct impingement system, chambered in 7.62x51mm NATO.

=== Upper receivers ===
The upper receiver incorporates the fore stock, the charging handle, the gas operating system, the barrel, the bolt and bolt carrier assembly. The BCL 102 employ a modular design with a MLOK handguard. Thus one upper receiver can quickly and easily be substituted for another. Upper receivers are available with barrels of different weights, lengths, calibers, and rail systems with various sights and accessories.

The standard BCL 102 rifle uses an 18.5" barrel, to be legally categorized as a non-restricted firearm in Canada.

==== Charge Handle ====
BCL uses an ambidextrous rear charging handle. Some users have reported that third party charge handle require shaving off some of the material off the 'ears' of these handles. This seems to affect Wave 2 rifles only.

=== Lower receivers ===
The lower receiver incorporates the magazine well, the pistol grip, the buttstock, the buffer and the buffer spring. The lower receiver also contains the trigger, disconnector, hammer and fire selector (collectively known as the fire control group).

=== Barrel ===
Some of their barrels were reportedly made by International Barrels Inc.

=== Sights ===
The BCL 102 uses standard picatinny rails, which allows the use of various scopes and sighting devices.

=== Muzzle devices ===
The BCL 102's barrel has standard 5/8" x 24 threading on the end, which allows a variety of muzzle devices to be installed on it. As of Wave 2, they come with a flash hider installed.

=== Magazines ===
The BCL 102 uses 10-20-30-round staggered-column AR-10/SR-25 style magazines. Due a clause in Canada's magazine restrictions, the maximum amount limit allowed is 10 rounds while using a XCR-M pistol magazine. All other common magazines available are pinned or physically limited to 5 rounds per Canadian law.

=== Calibers ===
The BCL 102 will have a 5.56 NATO version in Summer 2018, followed by a 9mm version in Fall 2018. Other calibers being considered include .243 Winchester, 6.5 Creedmoor and 7mm-08.

== BCL 102 MK7 & MK7X ==
The BCL 102 MK7 & MK7X are upgraded models of the 102. Introduced in November 2019, they are offered in two chamberings:

- .308 Winchester
- 6.5mm Creedmoor

The MK7 and MK7X were the first firearms that was fully redesigned and manufactured by Black Creek Labs. Earlier models of the BCL102 were operated under the control of company affiliate North Eastern Arms.

== Gallery ==
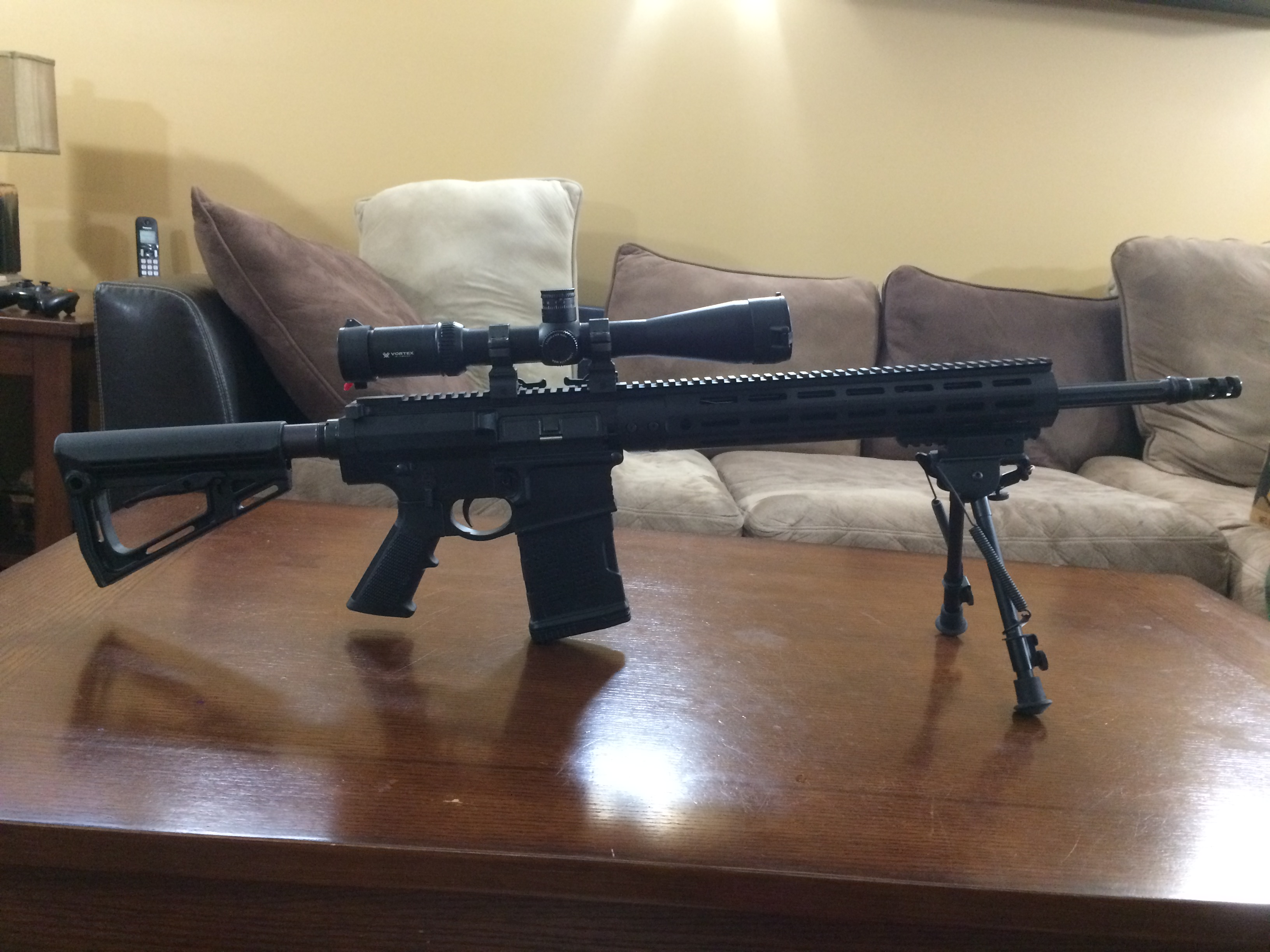
BCL 102 (Wave 1) with scope

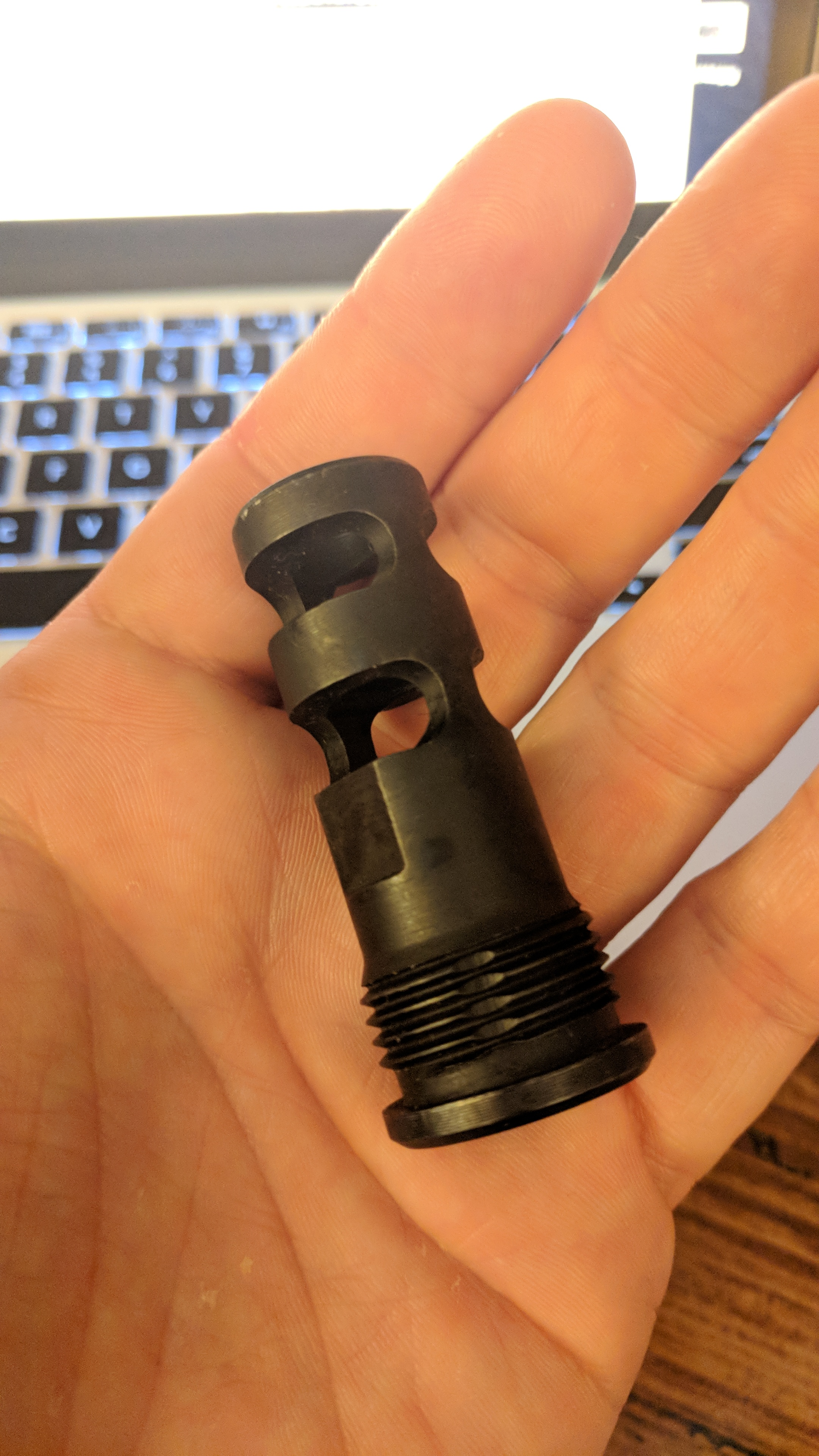
Stock muzzle device

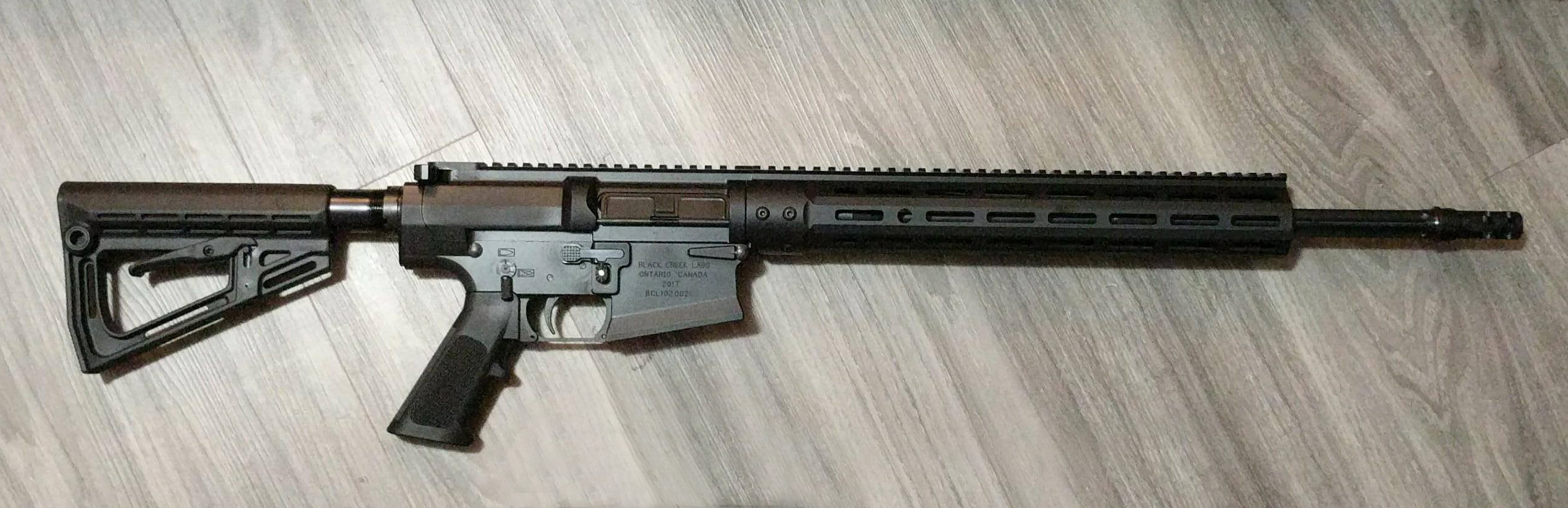
BCL 102 (Wave 2) stock hardware

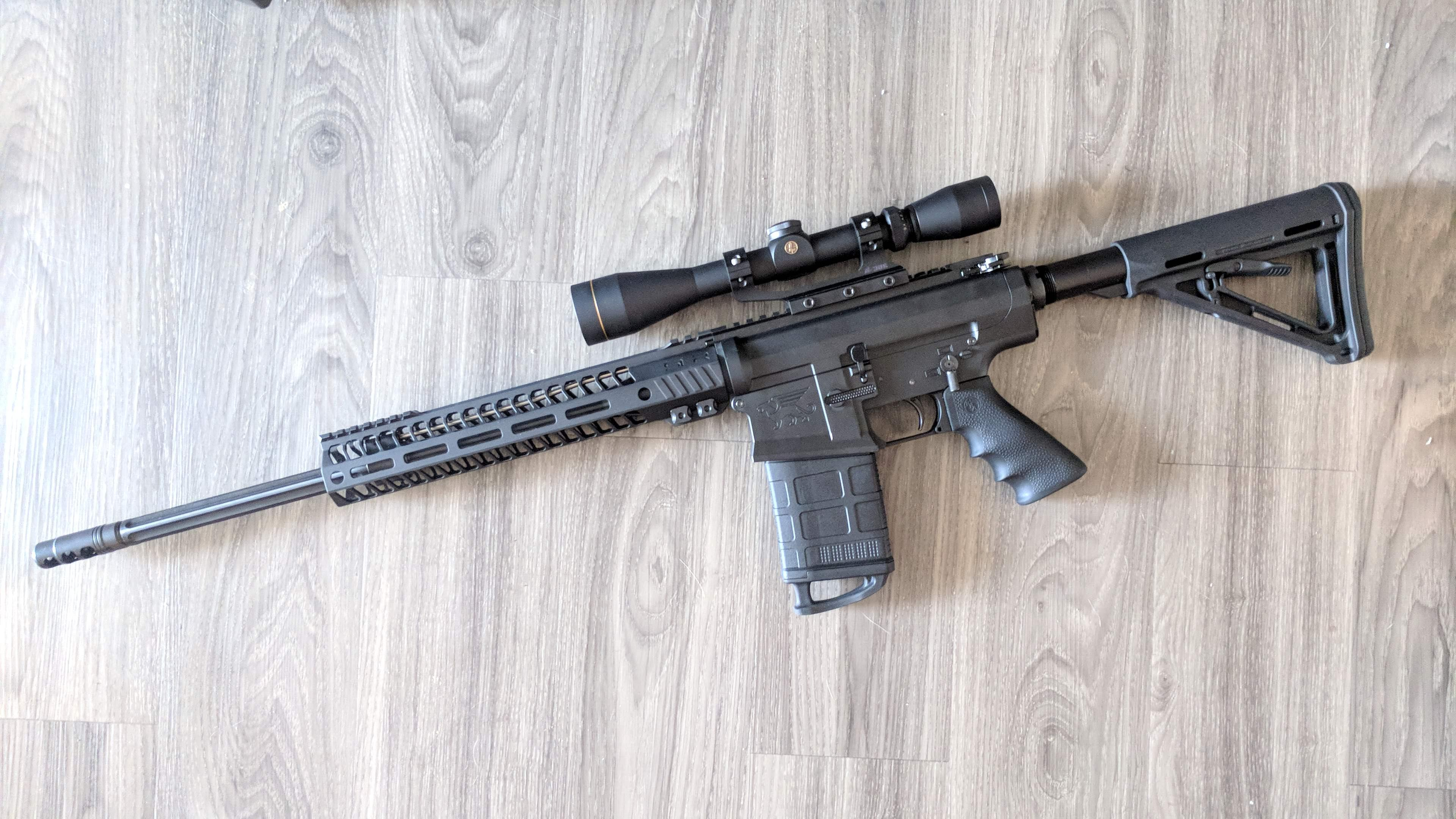
BCL 102 (Wave 2) with aftermarket parts
