= Colt CM901 =

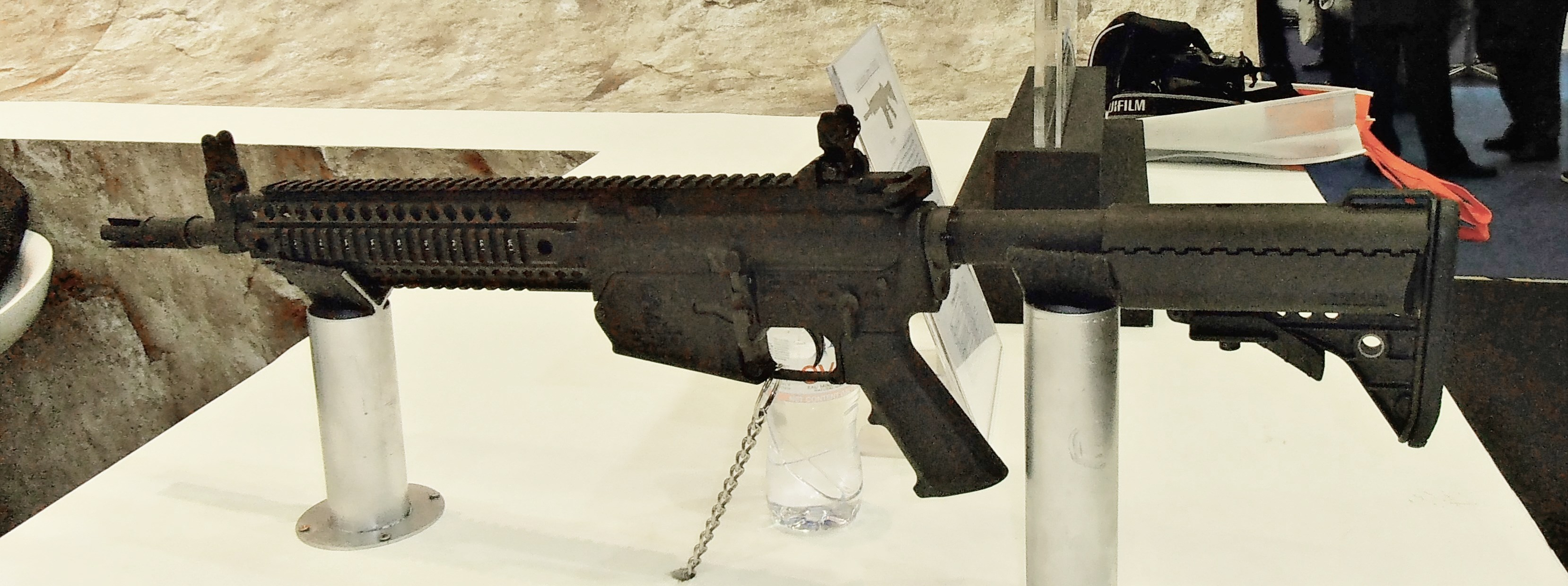
- The 7.62mm Colt CM901
- Type: Assault rifle Battle rifle
- Place of origin: United States

Service history
- In service: 2013–present
- Used by: See Users
- Wars: 2013 Lahad Datu standoff

Production history
- Manufacturer: Colt's Manufacturing Company
- Produced: 2010s–present
- Variants: SP901; LE901-16S

Specifications
- Mass: 4.3 kg (9.4 lb) (unloaded)
- Length: 950 mm (37.5 in) (stock extended); 870 mm (34.24 in) (stock retracted)
- Barrel length: 410 mm (16.1 in)
- Cartridge: 5.56×45mm NATO; 6.8mm Remington SPC; 7.62×39mm 7.62×51mm NATO
- Caliber: 5.56mm/.223 6.8mm/.277 7.62mm/.308/.311
- Action: Gas-operated, closed rotating bolt, Stoner bolt and carrier piston
- Rate of fire: 700–950 rounds per minute
- Effective firing range: 700 m
- Feed system: 30-round detachable STANAG magazines, or Proprietary box magazines (7.62×51mm NATO), or SR-25 pattern magazine (7.62×51mm NATO)
- Sights: Flip-up/Fixed (depends on upper receiver)

The Colt CM901 is a modular select-fire rifle. Its caliber and barrel length can be changed without the use of tools. The semi-automatic variant is classed as the LE901.

== Design ==
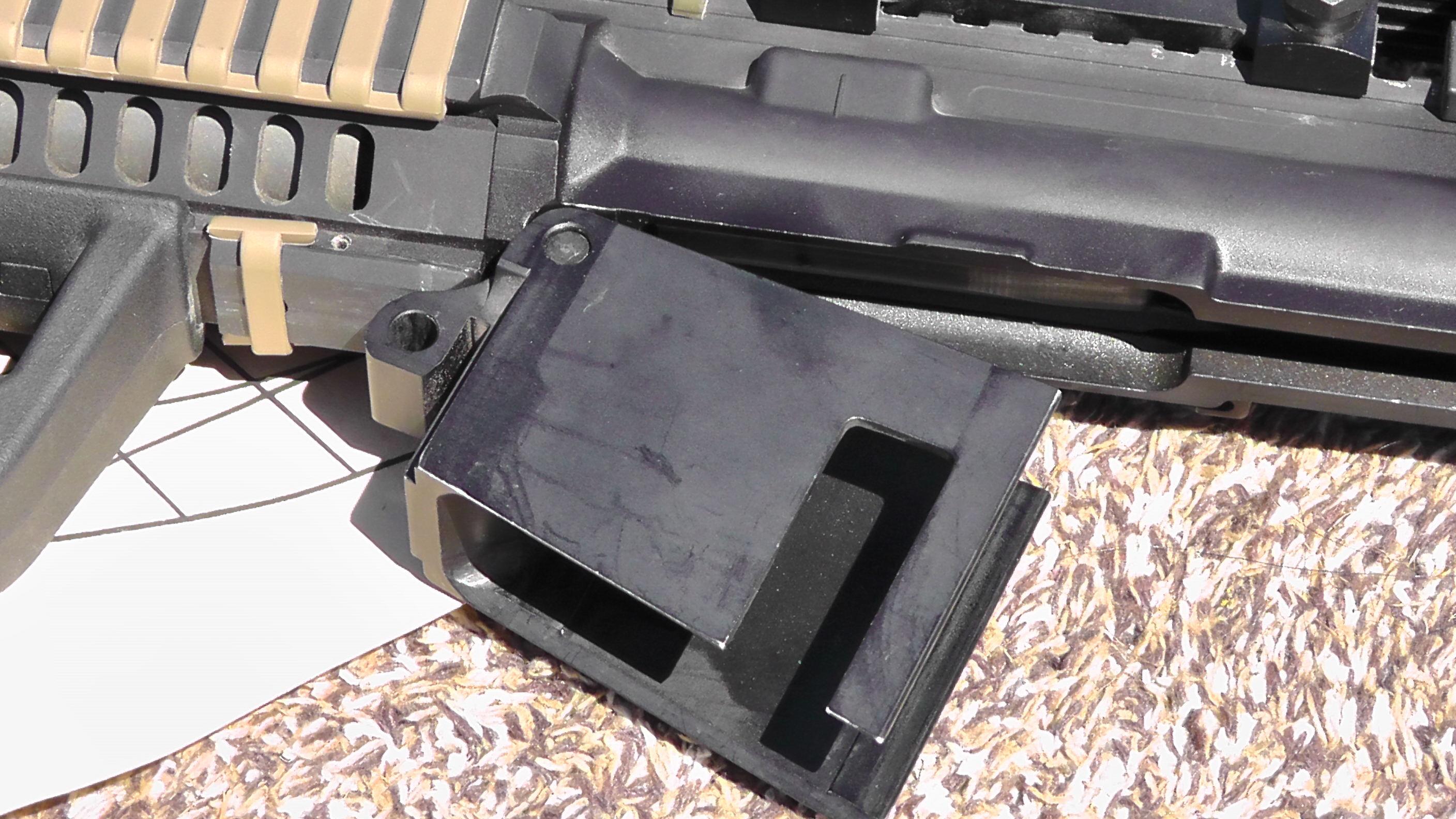
LE 901 Adapter block

The CM901 (Colt Modular) weapons system is based on Colt's existing M16/M4 military designs. It shares the direct gas impingement operation, as well as much of the action, controls, and basic aesthetics with previous Colt rifle designs. The system's heart is a common lower receiver housing an enlarged magazine well that will accommodate 5.56×45mm rounds using a STANAG magazine or larger caliber ammunition than NATO 5.56×45mm rounds using either a proprietary magazine or an SR-25 pattern magazine, ambidextrous controls for the bolt release mechanism, magazine release, and fire selector/safety lever, trigger group, pistol grip, telescopic stock, and buffer tube. The system will accept a series of upper receiver assemblies that contain the respective action required to accommodate the various caliber rounds accepted by the weapon. A re-designed upper receiver firing standard 5.56mm ammunition will be produced in various barrel lengths, all having a monolithic design with a full-length top rail, and three auxiliary rails for mounting accessories, free-floating barrels, and front and rear flip-up sights standard, when not using upgraded optics.

Upper receivers will be available in several calibers and barrel lengths, as short as 270 millimetres (10.7 in) for the 5.56mm model. The lower receiver will also accept older mil-spec M16 or M16 upper receivers with an adapter. Receivers will be available that accept 5.56×45mm NATO rounds, 6.8×43mm Remington SPC rounds, 7.62×39mm rounds, and 7.62×51mm NATO rounds. Each upper receiver has its own rail system, which allows scopes, or other optics to be pre-sighted for each configuration, and swapped quickly to perform different tasks.

The system can be anodized in a standard matte black finish, but has standard color options including Desert Brown, Digital Camouflage, and Vista Camouflage, which are applied during the anodizing process to prevent wear during use.

== Variants ==
=== Civilian model ===
Colt released the LE901-16S to civilian buyers on July 20, 2012. Colt planned to release several variants of the CM901 system, with the civilian "LE901-16S" being the first. The civilian model will be available with all the same features and finishes as the planned Law Enforcement and Military models, but will ship stock with a semi-automatic lower receiver, and an upper receiver with a 410 millimetres (16.1 in) barrel chambered for .308 Winchester ammunition. The barrel will come with a Vortex Flash hider. This variant will also accept civilian AR-15 upper receivers of multiple barrel lengths, and includes a magazine well adapter to accommodate smaller AR-15 magazines.

=== Colt CK901 ===
Colt CK901
- Type: Assault rifle

Service history
- In service: 2014–present
- Used by: Yemeni Republican Guard
- Wars: Yemeni Civil War

Production history
- Designed: 2014
- Manufacturer: Colt Canada
- Produced: 2014–present

Specifications
- Cartridge: 7.62×39mm
- Feed system: 30-round detachable box magazine
- Sights: Flip-up/Fixed

In June 2014 Colt Canada announced the new CK901 (Colt-Kalashnikov) in an interview with IHS Jane's at Eurosatory. It is a direct-impingement AR-AK hybrid chambered in 7.62×39mm that is similar to the KAC SR-47. The standard carbine has a 16-inch barrel, a monolithic picatinny rail along the upper receiver, a three-position accessory rail forend (sides and bottom), folding front sight, detachable rear sight, ambidextrous charging handle, and an ambidextrous 3-position selector (AUTO-SEMI-SAFE). The carbine weighs in at 3.6 kg (7.9 lbs) without accessories and 4.5 kg (9.92 lbs.) with accessories (like a loaded magazine and sling). A Short-Barreled Rifle (SBR) version with a 13-inch barrel is also rumored to be in the works. It comes with polymer 30-round AK-style magazines manufactured by US-Palm. It can supposedly feed from any AK-47-interface magazines, but cannot feed from AK-47/RPK-type drum magazines due to its longer magazine well.

The CK-901 was first sold to the Yemeni Republican Guard in 2014. Rifles made for that order can be identified by a serial number with the YEM prefix. Further contracts in the Middle East and the Gulf States are being sought. There is talk of a civilian model, but none have surfaced as yet.

Potentially, like the modular CM901, the CK-901 could be made to chamber the smaller-bore Soviet 5.45×39mm M-74 round. Much like the CM901 7.62 NATO / 5.56mm NATO rifle, it could be made to chamber the smaller-bore ammunition from a changed-out upper receiver. It would feed from AK-74-type magazines through an adapter block for the larger 7.62mm Soviet magazine well in the lower receiver.

=== Colt Canada C20 DMR ===
The LE901 would eventually be the basis of the 7.62 version of the Modular Rail Rifle inheriting several features from the rifle, including the lower receiver design and the ambidextrous controls. Eventually further development would lead to the creation of the C20 Rifle.

== Users ==
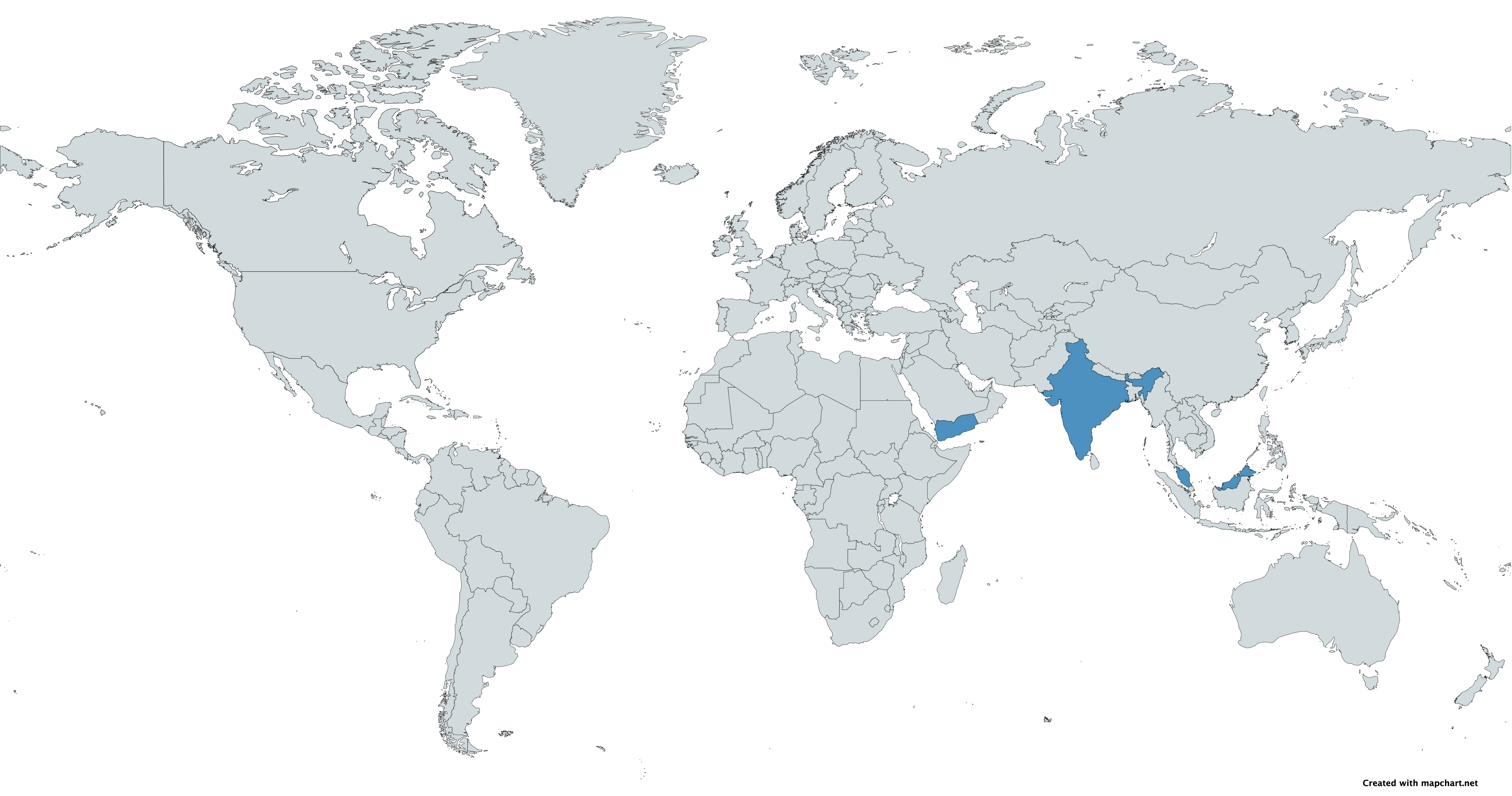
A map with Colt CM901 users in blue

- India: Unknown number of units procured by Greyhounds of Telangana Police
- Malaysia:
  - The Malaysian Army purchased 200 CM901s assault rifles, which will be used as a general issue rifle.
  - The Royal Malaysia Police of Sabah states were observed using CM901 7.62mm NATO battle rifles while responding to the 2013 Lahad Datu standoff.
- Yemen: Used by Yemeni Republican Guard.
