= SR-25 pattern magazine =

Detachable firearm magazine

An SR-25, AR-10 or LR-308 pattern magazine is a type of detachable firearm magazine based on the original Armalite AR-10 "waffle" magazine design introduced in the late 1950s, used for the .308 Winchester/7.62×51mm NATO and other similar-sized short-action full-power cartridges.

The design has been used on many AR-10 derivatives, for instance in the Knight's Armament SR-25 and DPMS Panther LR-308, as well as bolt-action rifles such as the Mossberg MVP .308, Ruger Precision Rifle and Q FIX. Aftermarket magazines are produced by Magpul, Lancer Systems, and others. Not all AR-10 rifles use magazines compatible with the SR-25 pattern. For example, HK417/MR308/MR762 uses a proprietary design. Notably, Armalite switched from their original pattern magazines to modified M14 magazines in 1996 with their new AR-10B model, but reintroduced their original (SR-25 pattern) magazine design with the AR-10A model in 2012.

== Firearms compatible with SR-25 pattern magazines ==
=== AR-10/AR-308 type rifles ===
- Armalite AR-10A
- Bushmaster .308 ORC
- Colt CM901-16S (.308 configuration)
- Colt Canada C20 DMR
- CORE Rifle Systems CORE30
- Diamondback DB10
- DPMS LR308
- JP Enterprises LRP-07
- KAC SR-25
- LaRue OBR
- Les Baer .308
- LMT .308 MWS/L129A1
- LWRCI REPR
- M110 SASS
- Mega Arms MATEN
- POF P-308 and Revolution/Rogue
- PSA PA-10
- Remington R-25
- Remington RSASS
- Ruger SR-762 and SFAR
- SIG716
- Smith & Wesson M&P10
- Sako M23 (7.62 TKIV 23)

=== Other rifles ===
- Beretta ARX200
- Brügger & Thomet APC308 Carbine and DMR
- IWI Tavor 7
- IWI ACE (7.62 NATO version)
- McMillan CS5
- Mossberg MVP
- POF USA ReVolt Heavy
- Q FIX
- SIG MCX Spear
- Troy Pump Action Rifle (PAR)

== Cartridges compatible with SR-25 pattern magazines ==
Some cartridges are dimensionally similar to .308 Winchester to fit into SR-25 pattern magazines, its not uncommon for the cartridges to have the same rim diameter, which allows the use of the same bolt.

Cartridge	Requires Modification to the magazine	Capacity in standard magazine
.260 Remington		20
6.5mm Creedmoor	no	20
6.5×47mm Lapua	no	20
.277 Fury	no	20
7mm-08 Remington		20
.308 Winchester/7.62×51mm NATO	no	20
8.6mm Blackout	no	20
.338 Federal	yes	20
.45 Raptor	yes	20
RAS-12 Shotgun	yes	5

== See also ==
- STANAG magazine, a standardized firearm magazine based on the 5.56×45mm cartridge
