= ArmaLite AR-10 =

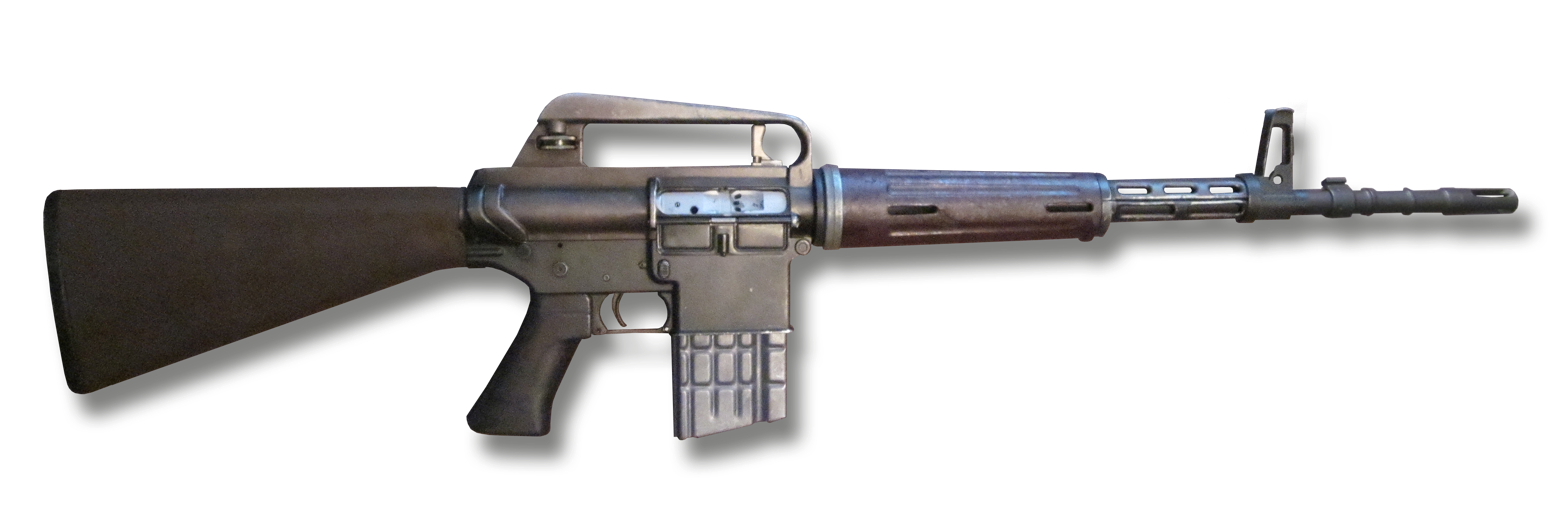
- An ArmaLite AR-10 (Portuguese model)
- Type: Battle rifle
- Place of origin: United States

Service history
- In service: 1960–1976 (Portugal); 1958–1985 (Sudan)
- Used by: See AR-10 purchasers by country
- Wars: Portuguese Colonial War; First Sudanese Civil War; Dominican Civil War; Operation Seroja; Second Sudanese Civil War; Militias-Comando Vermelho conflict

Production history
- Designer: Eugene Stoner
- Manufacturer: ArmaLite; Artillerie-Inrichtingen (AI); Colt's Manufacturing Company
- Produced: 1956–present
- No. built: 9,900

Specifications
- Mass: 3.29–4.05 kg (7.25–8.9 lb) w/o magazine
- Length: 1,050 mm (41.3 in)
- Barrel length: 528 mm (20.8 in)
- Cartridge: 7.62×51mm NATO
- Action: Gas-operated, closed rotating bolt, Stoner bolt and carrier piston
- Rate of fire: 700 rounds/min (fully automatic), variable (semi-automatic)
- Muzzle velocity: 820 m/s (2,690 ft/s)
- Effective firing range: 600 m (660 yd) (700 m (770 yd) with A.I. 3.6× telescopic sight)
- Feed system: 20-round detachable box magazine
- Sights: Adjustable aperture rear sight, fixed post front sight

The ArmaLite AR-10 is a 7.62×51mm NATO battle rifle designed by Eugene Stoner in the late 1950s and manufactured by ArmaLite (then a division of the Fairchild Aircraft Corporation). When introduced in 1956, the AR-10 used an innovative combination of a straight-line barrel/stock design with phenolic composite, a new patent-filed gas-operated bolt and carrier system and forged alloy parts resulting in a small arm significantly easier to control in automatic fire and over 1 lb (0.45 kg) lighter than other infantry rifles of the day. Over its production life, the original AR-10 was built in relatively small numbers, with fewer than 10,000 rifles assembled. However, the ArmaLite AR-10 became the sole ancestor for the AR-15 Styled Rifle platform.

In 1957, the basic AR-10 design was rescaled and substantially modified by ArmaLite to accommodate the .223 Remington cartridge, and given the designation ArmaLite AR-15.

In 1959, ArmaLite sold its rights to the AR-10 and AR-15 to Colt's Manufacturing Company due to financial difficulties, and limitations in terms of manpower and production capacity. After modifications (most notably, the charging handle was re-located from under the carrying handle like AR-10 to the rear of the receiver, and a change of the caliber to 5.56x45mm NATO), the new redesigned rifle (the AR-15) was subsequently adopted by the U.S. military as the M16 rifle. Colt continued to use the AR-15 trademark for its line of semi-automatic-only rifles, which it marketed to civilian and law-enforcement customers as the Colt AR-15.

== History and development ==
ArmaLite began as a small engineering company founded by George Sullivan, the patent counsel for Lockheed Corporation, and funded by Fairchild Engine and Airplane Corporation. On October 1, 1954, the company was incorporated as the ArmaLite Corporation, becoming a subdivision of Fairchild. With its limited capital and tiny machine shop, ArmaLite was never intended to be an arms manufacturer. The company focused on producing small arms concepts and designs to be sold or licensed to other manufacturers. Sullivan leased a small machine shop in Hollywood, California, hired several employees, and began work on a prototype for a lightweight survival rifle for use by downed aircrew.

The M1941 Johnson rifle served as a direct technical progenitor for the AR-10 and AR-15 platforms through the design innovations. After the Johnson R-14 rifle model was rejected by the U.S. Army, Melvin Johnson Jr. worked as a consultant for ArmaLite and Colt’s Manufacturing Company, where his multi-lug rotating bolt design was adapted for the AR-15 series and it successors.

While testing the prototype of the ArmaLite AR-5 survival rifle design at a local shooting range, Sullivan met Eugene Stoner, a small arms inventor, whom Sullivan hired to be ArmaLite's chief design engineer. At the time, ArmaLite Inc. was a very small organization (as late as 1956 it had only nine employees, including Stoner). With Stoner as the chief design engineer, ArmaLite quickly released a number of unique rifle concepts.

The first prototypes of the 7.62 mm AR-10 emerged between 1955 and early 1956. At the time, the United States Army was in the midst of testing several rifles to replace the obsolete M1 Garand. Springfield Armory's T44E4 and heavier T44E5 were essentially updated versions of the Garand chambered for the new 7.62 mm round, while Fabrique Nationale submitted their FN FAL as the T48.

ArmaLite's AR-10 entered the competition late, hurriedly submitting two hand-built "production" AR-10 rifles based on the fourth prototype in the fall of 1956 to the United States Army's Springfield Armory for testing. The AR-10 prototypes (four in all) featured a straight-line stock design, rugged elevated sights, an oversized aluminum flash suppressor and recoil compensator, and an adjustable gas system. In the fourth and final prototype, the upper and lower receiver were hinged with the now-familiar hinge and takedown pins, and the charging handle did not reciprocate and was not attached to the bolt carrier. For a 7.62mm NATO rifle, the AR-10 prototype was incredibly lightweight at only 6.85 lb empty. Initial comments by Springfield Armory test staff were favorable, and some testers commented that the AR-10 was the best lightweight automatic rifle tested by the Armory.

The rifle's aluminum/steel composite barrel (an untried prototype design specified for the tests by ArmaLite's president, George Sullivan, over Stoner's vehement objections) burst in a torture test conducted by Springfield Armory in early 1957. ArmaLite quickly replaced it with a conventional steel barrel, but the damage had been done. The final Springfield Armory report advised against the adoption of the rifle, stating that it would take "five years or more to take it through tests to adoption". While ArmaLite objected, it was clear that the AR-10, a brand-new rifle still in the prototype stage, was at a disadvantage compared to competing designs with longer development cycles, and by 1957, U.S. Army infantry forces urgently required a modern, magazine-fed infantry rifle to replace the M1. In the end, the Army chose the conventional T44, which entered production as the M14 rifle in 1957. That same year, ArmaLite completed about 50 production AR-10 rifles at its workshop for use as demonstrator models for its sales agents, including Samuel Cummings, a famous international arms dealer. Attempts to rush completion of these fifty rifles resulted in a few units that were assembled with improperly machined barrel extensions, a defect that went unnoticed at the time. These production rifles built at ArmaLite's workshop in Hollywood would later become known as the Hollywood model.

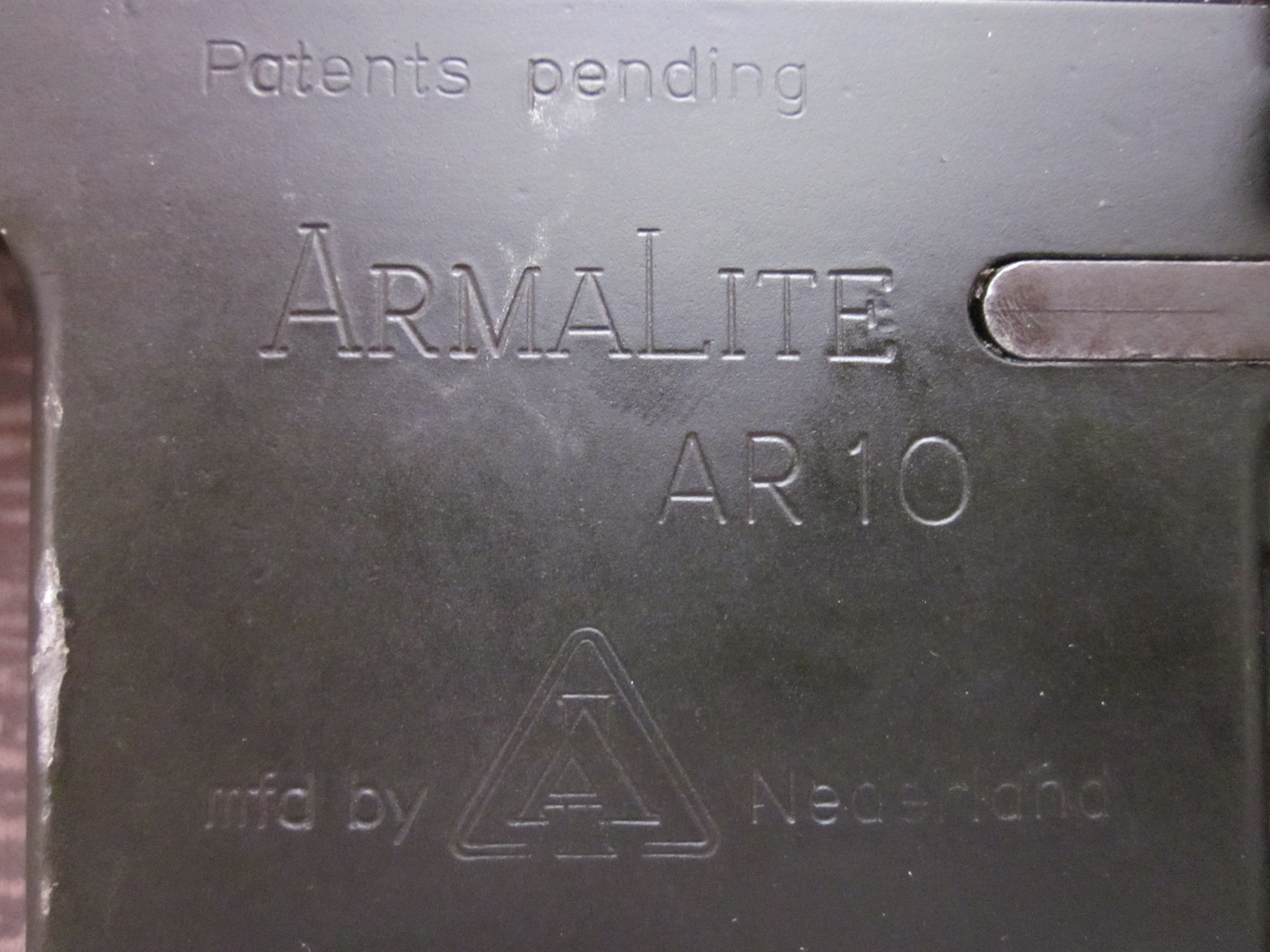
Close-up of ArmaLite AR-10 with Artillerie Inrichtingen (A.I.) markings

On July 4, 1957, Fairchild ArmaLite sold a five-year manufacturing license for the AR-10 to the Dutch arms manufacturer, Artillerie Inrichtingen (A.I.). With its large factory and production facilities, A.I. could produce the ArmaLite rifle in large quantities for which Fairchild expected orders would be forthcoming.

In 1957, Cummings secured an order of 7,500 AR-10 rifles from Nicaragua, with an initial delivery of 1,000 rifles to be delivered before January 1958. The order was contingent on a successful completion of a 7,500-round endurance test. With the AR-10 in short supply, Cummings left his personal demonstrator rifle with Nicaragua's chief military commander, General Anastasio Somoza, who personally conducted the endurance test trial. While General Somoza was firing this rifle for the trial, the bolt lug over the ejector sheared off and flew past Somoza's head. The general angrily returned Cummings' AR-10 and canceled the entire Nicaraguan order. The remaining Hollywood rifles were inspected and refitted as necessary with new parts to prevent the reoccurrence of the bolt lug failure, but the Nicaraguan order was lost for good.

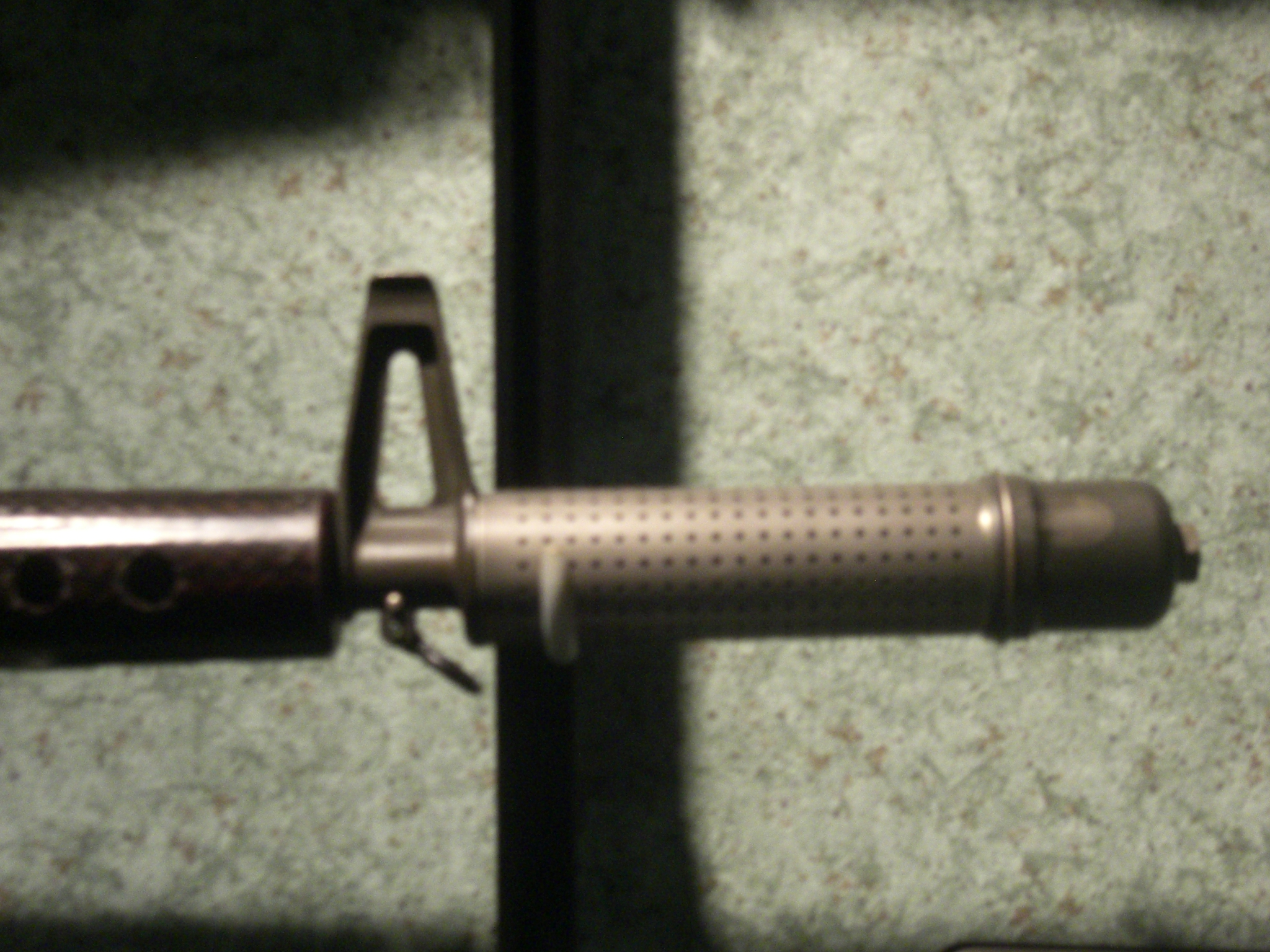
Close-up of flash Suppressor/compensator on early "Hollywood" model AR-10

A.I. officials meanwhile discovered a number of manufacturing and production issues in the Hollywood version of the AR-10, all of which had to be resolved before large-scale production could commence. In addition to designing and building tooling for the rifle, the design had to be converted to metric dimensions and subcontractors had to be found to supply materials or manufacture component parts. ArmaLite also continued to send A.I. product improvement requests, including an adjustable regulator, a repositioned gas tube, and a new three-prong flash suppressor. Accessories such as flash hiders, bayonet mounts, sling swivels, and sight graduations had to be designed.

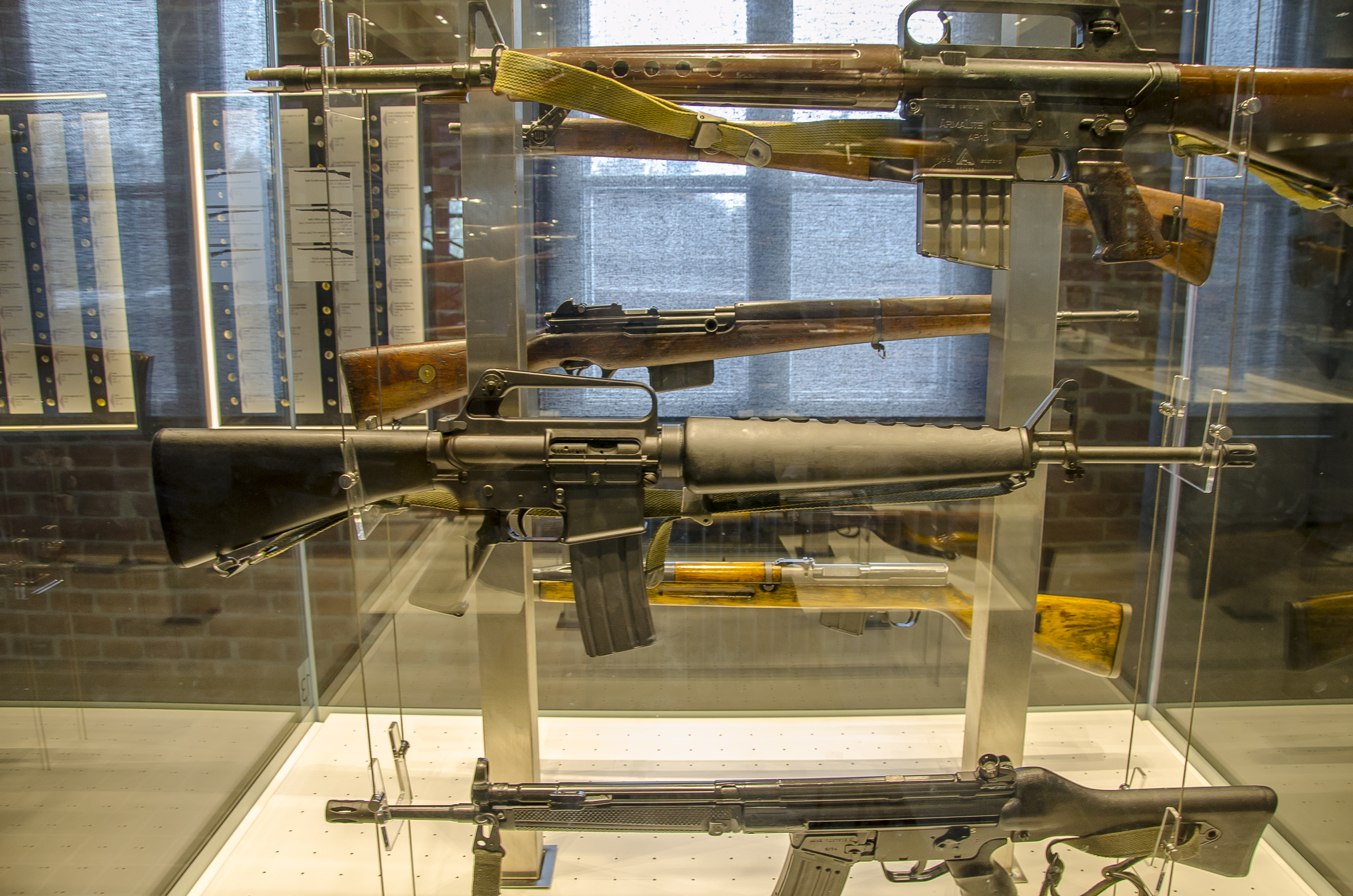
AR-10 Sudanese model (top) over an AR-15 successor model (center)

Firearms historians have separated AR-10 production under the A.I. license into at least three basic identifiable versions, along with various sporting, carbine, and other experimental designs and calibers. The three main variants have been termed the Sudanese model, the Transitional, and the Portuguese model AR-10. A.I. built all of these rifles, beginning with the Sudanese model AR-10. The Sudanese version derives its name from the sale of approximately 2,500 AR-10 rifles to the government of Sudan in 1958. The Sudanese model was equipped with a very lightweight, fluted steel barrel fitted with a trim, prong-style flash suppressor, a bayonet lug, lightweight fiberglass furniture, and sight graduations in Arabic. The Sudanese model weighed only 3.3 kg (7.3 lb) with an empty magazine. The price, including cleaning kit and four magazines, was US $225 per rifle. All AR-10s, whether produced by ArmaLite or by A.I., used the same Stoner-designed 20-round lightweight aluminum 'waffle' magazine with pressed-in, corrugated sides, intended to be discarded in combat once emptied.

AR-10 production was limited, though Guatemala, Burma, Italy, Cuba, Sudan and Portugal all purchased AR-10 rifles for limited issue to their military forces. Sudanese AR-10s were employed in frequent clashes with guerrilla forces and conflicts with neighboring countries, and a few captured rifles eventually turned up in unofficial service with various African and colonial armies, police, and guerrilla forces. The AR-10 remained in service with Sudanese Special Forces until 1985.

In 1958, a special 7.62×39mm caliber variant of the Sudanese AR-10 was produced in very small numbers for evaluation by Finland and Germany. That same year, an AR-10 with a 16" barrel was developed in response to a request by KLM Airlines for a carbine that could be issued to their crew for transpolar flights as part of an Arctic survival kit, and approximately 30 carbines were eventually produced. A number of Transitional AR-10s were also fitted with a folding bipod designed to lie flat under the forearm.

The Italian Navy acquired the AR-10 for its COMSUBIN underwater commando teams. Germany, Austria, the Netherlands, Finland, and South Africa also purchased small numbers of the AR-10 for test purposes, and Cuba's Batista government ordered 100 "Transitional" model rifles in 1958. The Cuban order was delivered to Havana, but in December 1958 Fidel Castro's forces took control of the country, including the warehouse containing the AR-10 shipment. In 1959, in response to a letter from ArmaLite's sales agent Sam Cummings, Castro invited Cummings to Havana to discuss payment for the AR-10 rifles. Fidel, his brother Raúl, and Che Guevara test-fired the AR-10 outside Havana. Impressed by the weapon's firepower, Castro paid Cummings for all 100 rifles.

However, rapidly worsening relations with the United States eliminated any chance of future AR-10 sales to Cuba, and Castro transferred the ex-Batista AR-10s to a group of Communist revolutionaries from the Dominican Republic. In June 1959, the rebels, led by Cuban officers, invaded the Dominican Republic. The invaders were defeated by the Dominican Army, and AR-10 rifles from the Batista shipment were found on the bodies of guerrillas.

The final Artillerie Inrichtingen design is known as the Portuguese model AR-10. This final version incorporated all that had been learned to date about the AR-10, including infantry service rifle and field test reports. In addition to a heavier barrel with chrome-lined chamber, optional bipod, and the removable plastic/metal handguards of the Transitional model, the Portuguese variant had wider bolt lugs, a stronger extractor, a new simplified three-position gas regulator, and a cocking handle featuring a forward bolt assist. It is believed that approximately 4,000-5,000 Portuguese variants were produced; nearly all of them were sold to the Portuguese National Defense Ministry by the Brussels-based arms dealer SIDEM International in 1960.

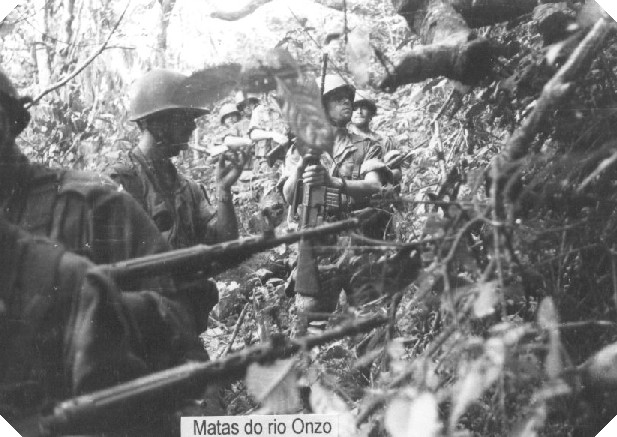
Portuguese paratroopers with AR-10 flash hiders visible.

The AR-10 was officially adopted by the Portuguese paratrooper battalions (Caçadores páraquedistas), and the rifle saw considerable combat service in Portugal's counter-insurgency campaigns in Angola and Mozambique.

In U.S. Army tests at Aberdeen Proving Ground in November 1960, and later in Portuguese service, the AR-10 gained a reputation for accuracy (some rifles would group into 25 mm (1 inch) at 100 meters with service ammunition). Portuguese paratroopers found the AR-10 to be not only accurate but reliable in combat, despite rugged service conditions in African jungle and savannah.

A few Portuguese and Sudanese model AR-10s found their way by various means to nearby African countries; in Chad, the AR-10 was much appreciated by members of the French Foreign Legion. As one police instructor in the Congo stated, "It was a good combat weapon that never failed me; a bit too long (but not as bad as the FAL or M14) for house-to-house work or really heavy brush, but great for 400-800 meters, in the flats - and really nice on the body, after wandering around 12-14 hours looking for bad guys."

Some Portuguese-model AR-10s were fitted with A.I.-modified upper receivers in order to mount 3× or 3.6× telescopic sights. These rifles were used by marksmen accompanying small patrols to eliminate individual enemies at extended ranges in open country. Other AR-10s were used by the paratroopers in a secondary role to launch rifle grenades. The AR-10's built-in gas cutoff design allowed it to fire Energa rifle grenades without adjustment of the gas system, and the self-loading action would even eject the spent blank shells and load the next one, permitting several grenades to be quickly fired. The added recoil took its toll on rifle stocks, and some Portuguese rifles were retrofitted with all-metal butt stocks to better withstand the strain caused by firing the heavy grenades. Additional sales of the AR-10 rifle were stymied after the Netherlands embargoed further shipments of the rifle to Portugal. Paratroopers deploying to Africa in later years were subsequently issued a collapsible stock version of the German Heckler & Koch G3 rifle. Nevertheless, the AR-10 continued in service with a few Portuguese airborne units and was in use as late as 1975 in the Portuguese Timor (now East Timor) decolonization emergency.

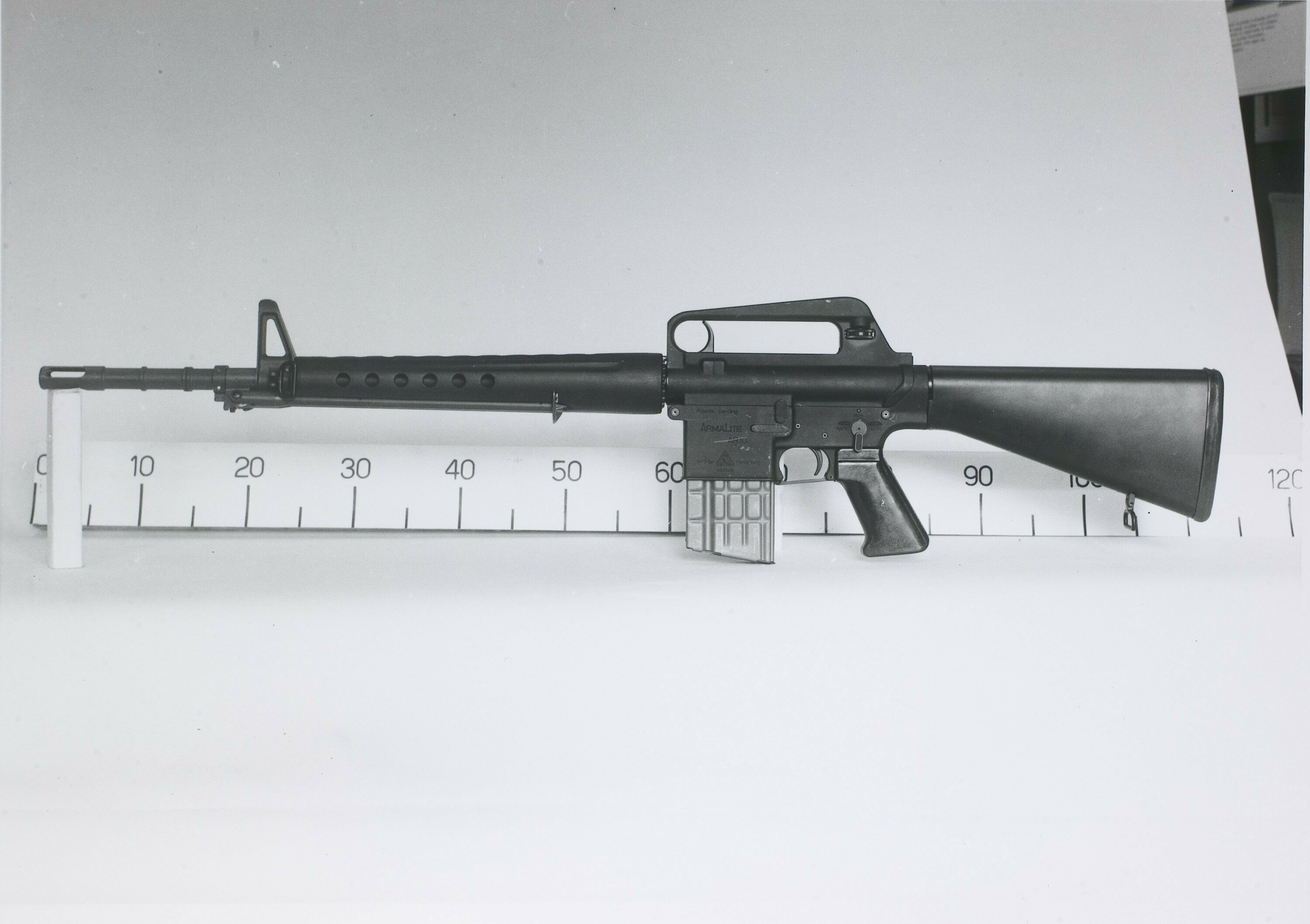
Artillerie Inrichtingen (A.I.) produced AR-10

Fairchild-ArmaLite was dissatisfied with the delays in setting up the tooling and production at A.I. for the AR-10, and made it clear that they would not be renewing A.I.'s license to produce the rifle. By 1960, hampered by Dutch export restrictions and discouraged by the lack of arms sales to major national purchasers, Artillerie Inrichtingen decided to exit the small arms production business altogether, and ceased all production of the AR-10 under its license from Fairchild-ArmaLite. By that time, fewer than 10,000 AR-10s had been produced, mostly military select-fire rifles, with a few semi-automatic only rifles produced for civilian use. All A.I. AR-10 parts inventories, tooling, and prototypes were either sold or scrapped; the barrel tooling was sold to Israel sometime in the early 1960s. All AR-10 production records, design drawings, manuals, literature, and other publications then in inventory were discarded.

In later years, some ex-military Sudanese and Portuguese model AR-10s were sold to civilian markets in the U.S., Canada, Australia, and New Zealand. Nearly all of the rifles imported to the latter three countries had their full-automatic fire selector disabled. Subsequently, as many as 2,500 Australian AR-10 rifles may have been confiscated and destroyed as a result of more restrictive firearms legislation passed in 1997.

Most of the AR-10 ex-military rifles shipped to the United States were in the form of parts kits, having been previously dismantled, though a few were legally imported as National Firearms Act (NFA) weapons. Large numbers of AR-10 7.62 mm magazines were imported as well. Many of these kit rifles were combined with various semi-auto receivers made by civilian manufacturers in order to permit legal ownership. During the early 1980s, Paragon Sales and Services in Joliet, Illinois, manufactured new semi-automatic lower receivers while using imported upper AR-10 receivers originally manufactured by Artillerie Inrichtingen in the Netherlands.

In 1957, in an effort to increase profits from the ArmaLite venture, Fairchild decided to compete in the U.S. Army's CONARC requirement for a new six-pound, high-velocity, .22-caliber selective-fire rifle accurate to 500 yards. In response, ArmaLite engineers Eugene Stoner, Jim Sullivan, and Bob Fremont used the basic AR-10 design to produce the ArmaLite AR-15 in .223 Remington, which was completed as a firing prototype in 1958. Fairchild-ArmaLite continued its efforts to sell both the AR-10 and AR-15 to various military forces around the world. However, the AR-10 rifle marketed by ArmaLite after 1958 was not the product-improved AR-10 developed by Artillerie Inrichtingen, but rather a design scaled-up from AR-15 plans and specifications, the AR-10A. None of the improvements incorporated by Artillerie Inrichtingen over three years of production were used in the new AR-10A.

Although the AR-10A did not benefit from the modifications undertaken by the Dutch licensee, it had some differences from the AR-15 (besides caliber and part dimensions), including a different bolt, trigger, and cocking handle design, along with a magazine canted forward at a five-degree angle. While interest in the AR-15 was considerable, the AR-10A failed to attract any orders from domestic or foreign military customers.

In 1959, ArmaLite sold its rights to the AR-10 and AR-15 to Colt Firearms due to financial difficulties, and limitations in terms of manpower and production capacity. After modifications (most notably, the charging handle was re-located from under the carrying handle like AR-10 to the rear of the receiver), the new redesigned rifle was subsequently adopted by the U.S. military as the M16 rifle. Colt continued to use the AR-15 trademark for its line of semi-automatic rifles marketed to civilian and law-enforcement customers, known as Colt AR-15.

== Design details ==
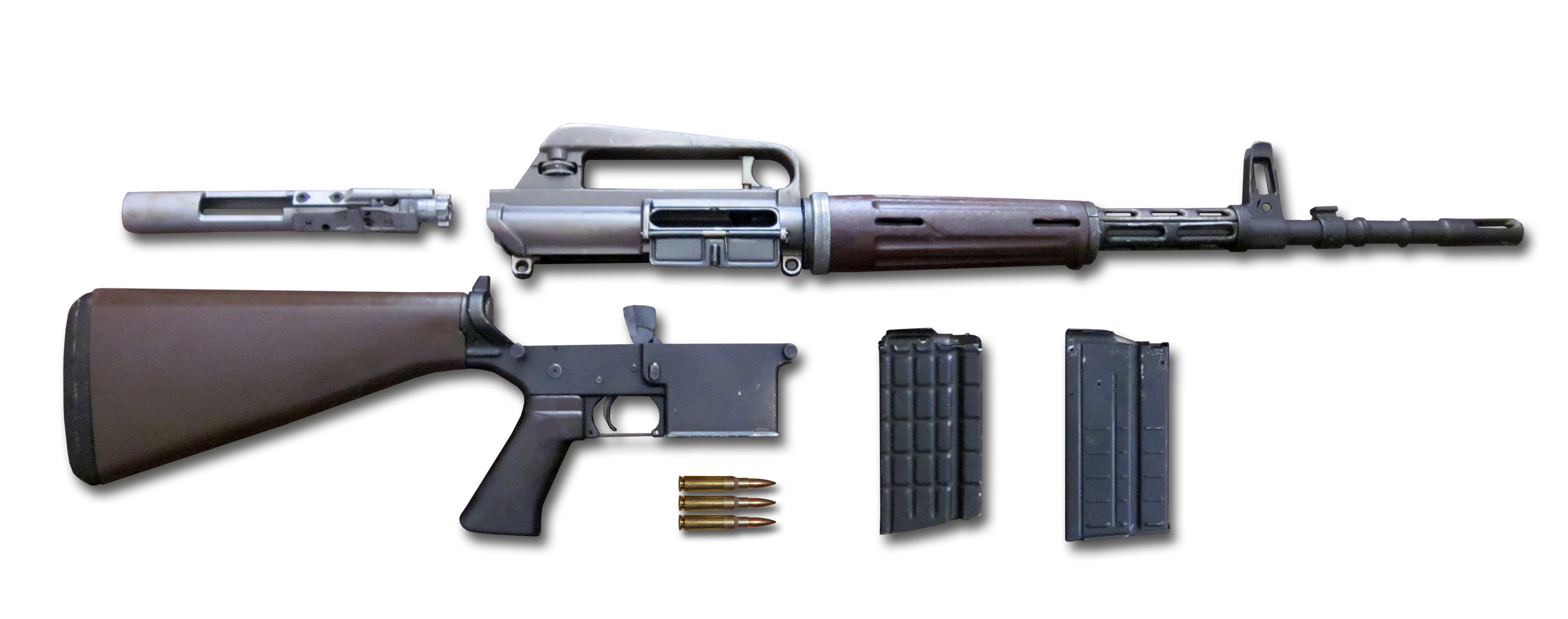
Stripped AR-10 (Portuguese model)

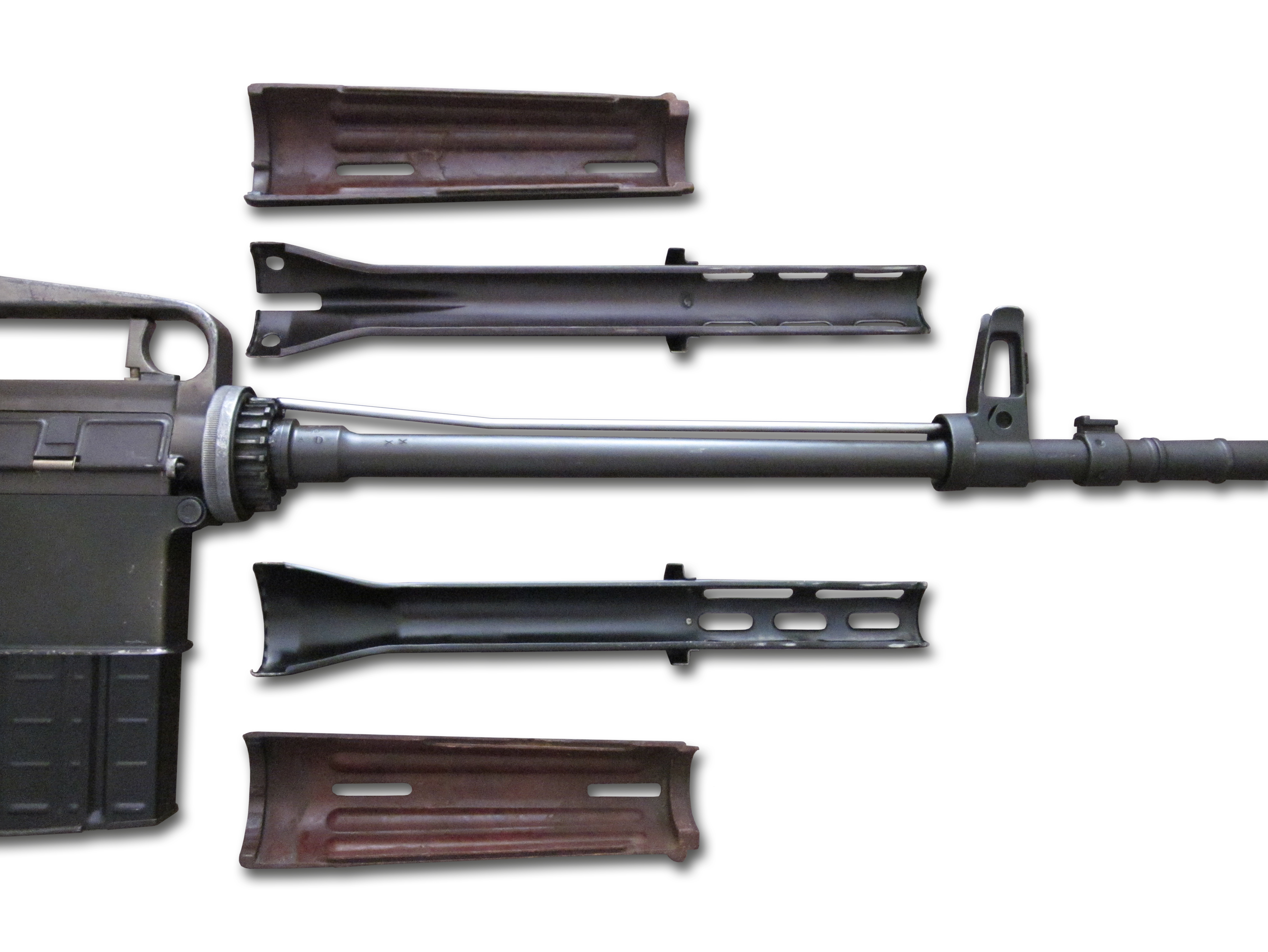
Close-up of stripped AR-10 barrel and gas tube (Portuguese model)

The AR-10 is a lightweight, air-cooled, magazine-fed, gas-operated rifle that uses a piston within the bolt carrier with a rotary bolt locking mechanism. The rifle has a conventional layout; it features an in-line stock, an aluminum alloy receiver and a fiberglass reinforced pistol grip, handguard, and buttstock. As part of the weight-saving design philosophy, in U.S. patent 2,951,424 the designer points out that:

By having the bolt carrier act as a movable cylinder and the bolt act as a stationary piston, the need for a conventional gas cylinder, piston and actuating rod assembly is eliminated.

While mostly an original design, the AR-10 built upon previously proven concepts. From the FAL it took the hinged receiver system allowing the rifle to be opened for cleaning much like a break-action shotgun. The ejection port cover is similar to that found on the German World War II-era StG44. The bolt locking mechanism is similar to the M1941 Johnson rifle (itself an adaptation of the Browning-designed Remington Model 8 bolt). From the German MG 13 light machine gun, FG 42 and M1941 Johnson machine gun came the idea of the straight-line stock layout. A "straight-line" recoil configuration increases controllability during burst or automatic fire by reducing muzzle climb. The AR-10's method of rotary bolt locking, straight-line recoil, and gas operation enhanced its inherent accuracy.

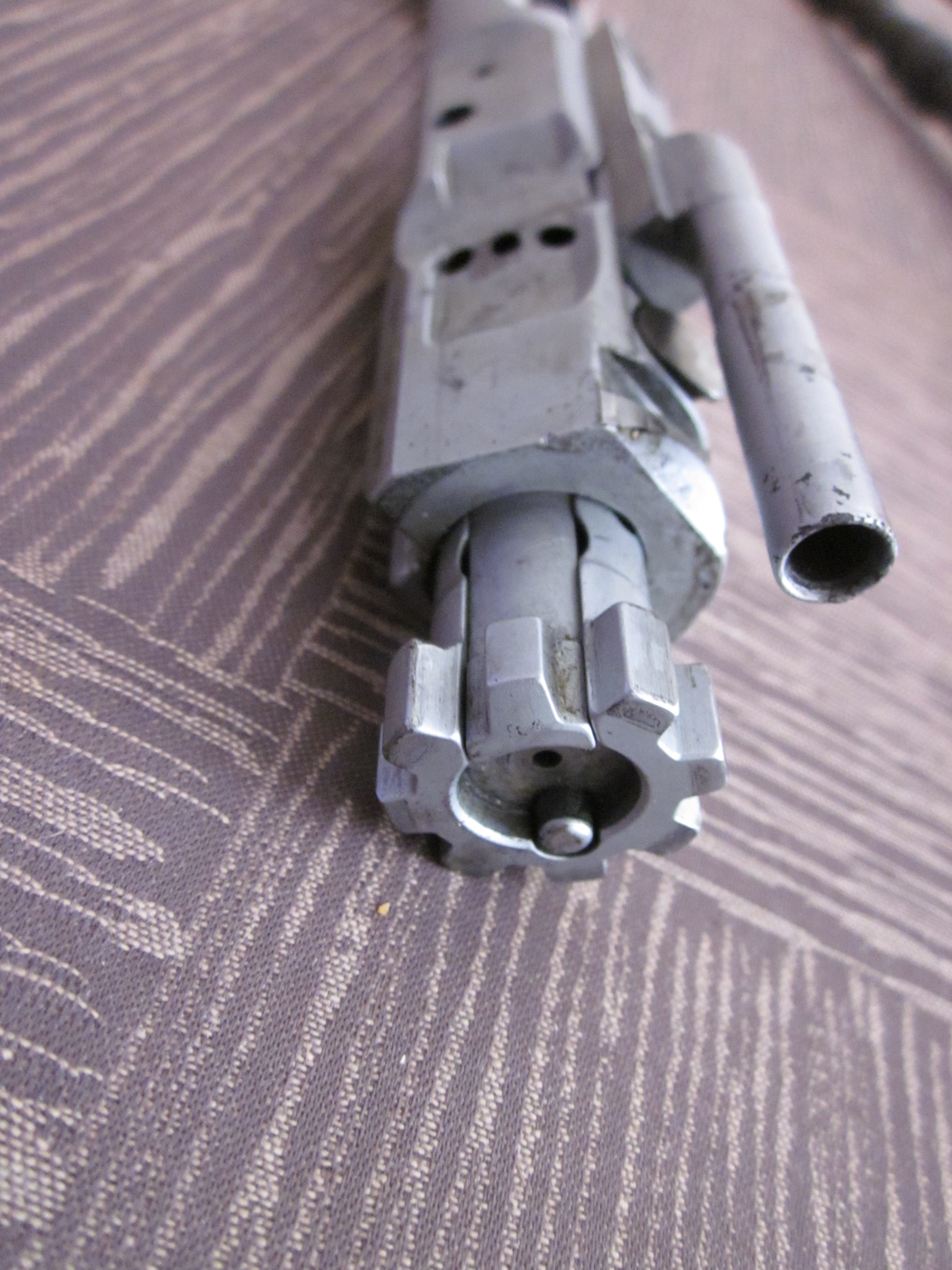
AR-10 bolt (Portuguese model)

The original AR-10 action (later developed into the ArmaLite AR-15 and M16 rifle) designed by Eugene Stoner is commonly called a direct impingement system, but it does not utilize a conventional direct impingement system. In U.S. patent 2,951,424, the designer states:

This invention is a true expanding gas system instead of the conventional impinging gas system.

The gas system, bolt carrier, and bolt-locking design were novel for the time. Most gas-operated rifles divert combustion gases from a port in the barrel to a piston and cylinder arrangement adjacent to the port. In Stoner's design, the gas travels from a port near the middle of the barrel through a steel tube back into the receiver. The gas enters a chamber inside the bolt carrier formed between the rear of the bolt and the inside of the bolt carrier. The bolt within the bolt carrier is fitted with piston rings to contain the gas. Once the bolt carrier moves to the rear a small distance, excess gas is vented through holes in its side. This use of the bolt and bolt carrier for the separate actions of a piston and gas cylinder simplified construction and saved weight. The Stoner bolt and carrier piston system is however ammunition specific, since it does not have an adjustable gas port or valve to adjust the weapon to various propellant and projectile or barrel length specific pressure behavior. Movement of the bolt carrier was in-line with the bore, greatly improving inherent accuracy, as well as keeping the rifle on target as the gun fired. Since the straight-line stock placed the shooter's eye well above the barrel the rifle's sights were mounted high, with the rear sight and elevation wheel calibrated for 7×51mm NATO for specific range settings contained in a carrying handle that also protected the cocking/charging lever. Windage was zeroed by drifting the rear sight.

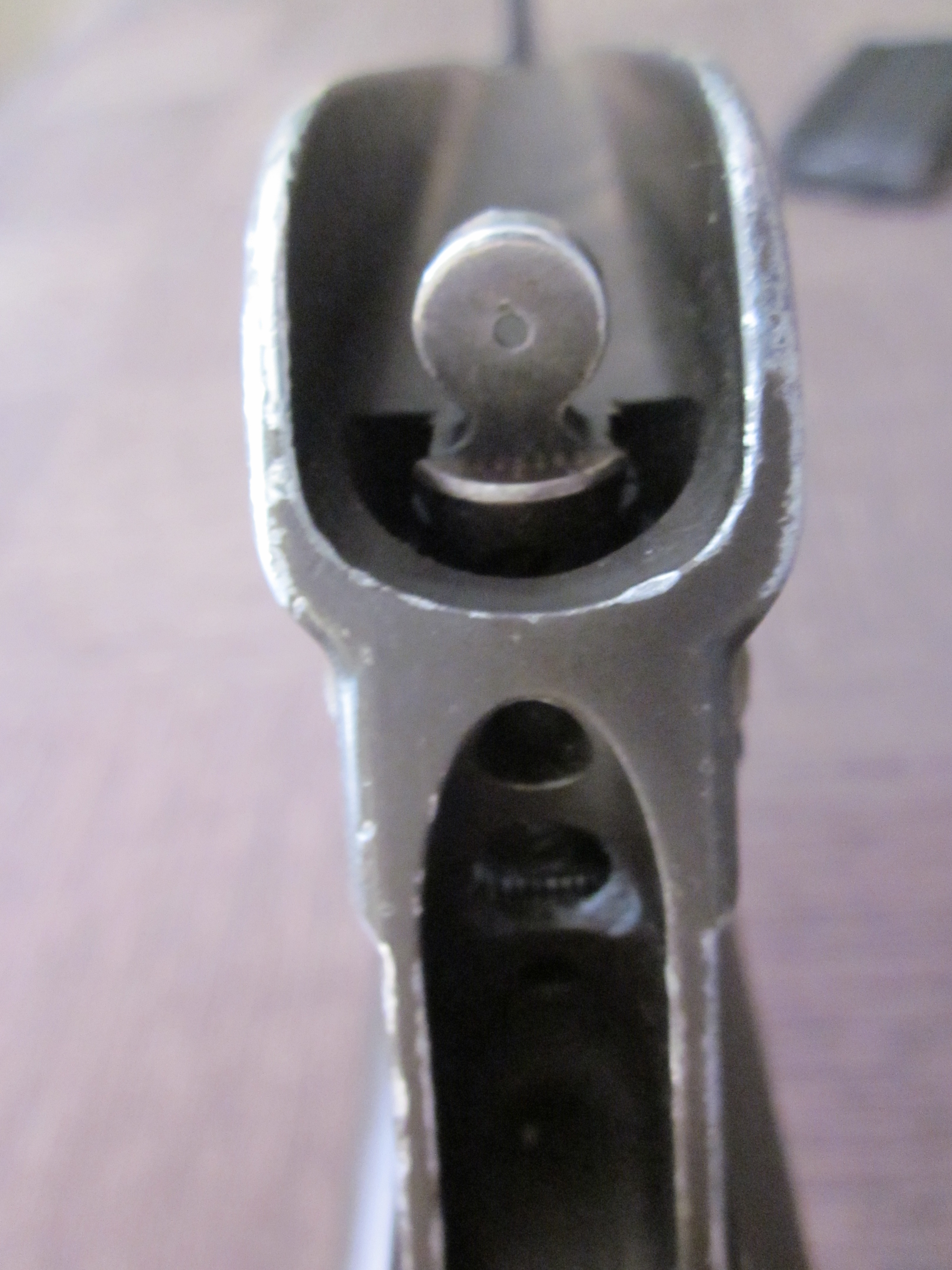
Range adjustable aperture rear sight (Portuguese model)

The receiver is made from forged and machined aluminum to reduce weight. The bolt locks into an extension on the barrel instead of the receiver allowing for a lightweight receiver while not compromising the strength of the bolt locking mechanism. On a few prototype guns, an all-aluminum ("Sullaloy") barrel was fitted at the insistence of George Sullivan – ArmaLite's president – though after the 1957 Springfield Armory tests, all production AR-10s were fitted with standard steel barrels. The stock is made from a fiberglass-reinforced phenolic composite with a core of rigid plastic foam. The handguards and pistol grip are also fiberglass reinforced plastic. Fairchild was an aircraft manufacturer, and the use of plastics, titanium, and aluminum were common in the aircraft industry at the time, though not generally used in firearms.

Several experimental prototypes of a belt-fed variant of the AR-10 were developed by ArmaLite and A.I. engineers, informally designated the AR-10 LMG. In one version, the belt was fed by a feed-chute connected to a 250-round ammo box carried on the user's back. All of the belt-fed prototypes experienced numerous issues with feed malfunctions and parts breakages, and these problems were never wholly solved during the weapon's development stage, which ended with the termination of A.I.'s production contract. As a result, no AR-10 LMG variants were ever sold.

== Semi-automatic only AR-10 production ==
=== ArmaLite AR-10B series ===
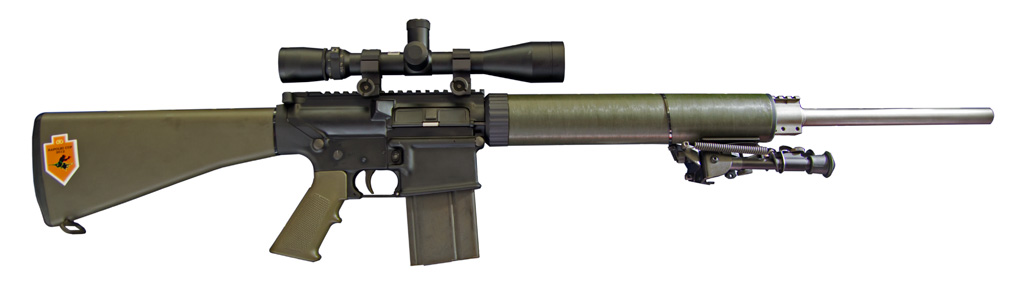
ArmaLite AR-10T

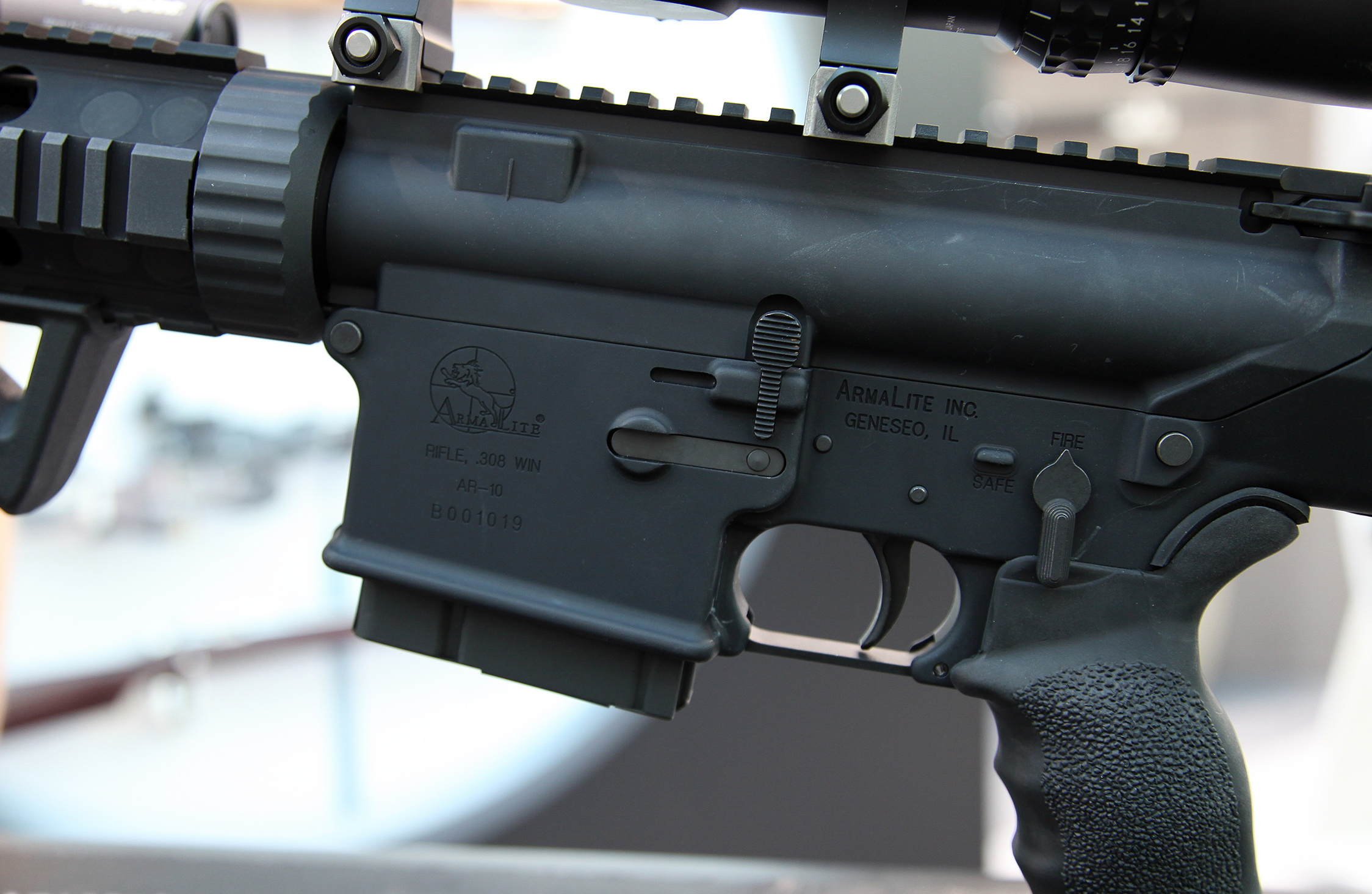
Close-up of an AR-10 National Match receiver

In 1995, former Army Ordnance officer Mark Westrom, owner of Eagle Arms, purchased the ArmaLite brand and the company became ArmaLite Inc. Shortly thereafter, ArmaLite Inc. introduced the completely new semi-automatic-only AR-10B rifle series. Notably, the AR-10B was not designed using the original AR-10 drawings from either ArmaLite or Artillerie Inrichtingen, but instead was based on the AR-15A2, with parts scaled up or redesigned as needed to fire the 7.62×51mm NATO (.308 Winchester) cartridge. The AR-10B prototype was composed of individual sub-components tested on a special lower receiver made of two slabs of aluminum fitted to a Knight's Armament Company SR-25 upper receiver assembly, and prototyped using computer analysis. The full prototype AR-10B was the first rifle off the production line.

Since 1995, the new ArmaLite company has also incorporated various other design and engineering improvements to the AR-10, including a newly designed steel magazine derived from the model used on the U.S. M14 rifle. The current ArmaLite AR-10 is offered in several versions including an A2 and A4 rifle or carbine with a collapsible stock, a target model (AR-10T), a "retro" AR-10B with Sudanese AR-10-style handguard and cocking lever (limited production) and one version chambered in 300 Remington SAUM. Current users include the Ontario Provincial Police Tactics and Rescue Unit.

=== New ArmaLite AR-10A series ===
After introducing the AR-10B model in 1996 which switched from the original pattern magazines to modified M14 magazines, ArmaLite reintroduced their original magazine pattern with their new AR-10A model in 2012 (also called SR-25 pattern magazine).

=== Other calibers offered ===
ArmaLite offers numerous other chamberings for the AR10 including: .243 Winchester, .260 Remington, 6.5mm Creedmoor, 7mm-08 Remington, and .338 Federal. Manufacturers of these barrels include Ballistic Advantage, Wilson Combat, and DPMS Panther Arms.

== Other .308/7.62x51 caliber ArmaLite type rifles ==
While ArmaLite Inc. holds a US trademark on the name "AR-10", other rifle manufacturers currently produce 7.62×51mm NATO auto-loading rifles that are based generally on the AR-10 design. These rifles differ from both the current and original ArmaLite AR10 in a few minor dimensions that make the ArmaLite AR10B not as modular as the rest of the AR-based firearms. Some of these companies offer selective-fire versions and versions in different calibers.

- Knights Armament Company SR-25
- Knights Armament Company M110 Semi-Automatic Sniper System
- Heckler & Koch HK417
  - M110A1 rifle
- IWI Zion-25
- Lewis Machine and Tool LM308MWS/L129A1
- Sako M23
- SIG Sauer 716i
- Smith & Wesson M&P10
- Colt CM901/LE901
  - Colt Canada C20 DMR
- Black Creek Laboratories BCL 102
- Ruger SR-762
  - Ruger SFAR

== AR-10 purchasers by country ==
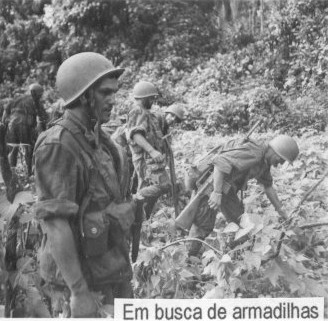
Portuguese pára-quedistas armed with AR-10 rifles during the Angolan War of 1961-1974.

- Bangladesh: Used by SWAT of Bangladesh Police
- Brazil - AR-10A4 variant used by BOPE of Military Police of Rio de Janeiro State and by CORE of Civil Police of Rio de Janeiro State. Armalite SuperSASS used by CORE
- Cuba
- Dominican Republic
- Finland
- Guatemala
- Italy
- Myanmar: Bought in 1960s
- Nicaragua
- Portugal
- Romania
- Sudan - Purchased 2500 rifles from the A.I. factory, delivery October 1958
- West Germany - Purchased 135 rifles from the A.I. factory, delivery August 1958

=== Non-state user ===
- KLM Royal Dutch Airlines - Purchased a few AR-10s as part of an Arctic survival kit carried on transpolar flights to stop large predators, including polar bears.

== See also ==
- AR-15 style rifle
