= Smith & Wesson M&P15 =

AR-15 style semi-automatic rifle

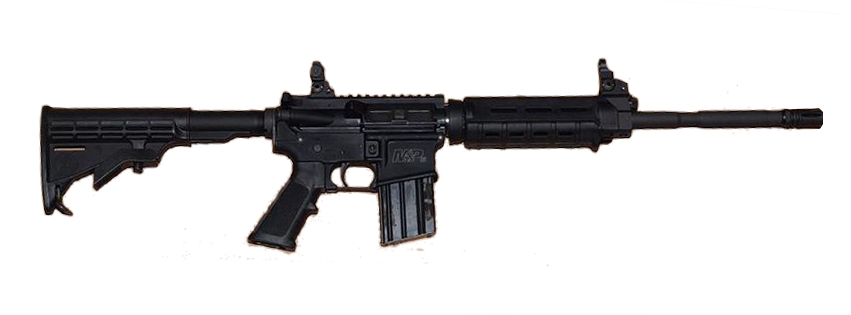
- Piston-driven M&P15 with standard grip, DPMS stock, and added Magpul hand guard
- Type: AR-15–style semi-automatic rifle
- Place of origin: United States

Production history
- Manufacturer: Smith & Wesson
- Produced: 2006–present
- Variants: See Variants

Specifications (M&P15)
- Mass: 3.06 kg (6.74 lb)
- Length: 813 mm (32 in) (collapsed); 889 mm (35 in) (extended)
- Barrel length: 406 mm (16 in)
- Cartridge: 5.56×45mm/.223 Remington
- Action: Gas-operated, rotating bolt
- Rate of fire: Semi-automatic
- Feed system: 10-, 20-, or 30-round detachable box magazine (STANAG 4179)

The Smith & Wesson M&P15 is an AR-15–style semi-automatic rifle by Smith & Wesson. Introduced in 2006, the firearm is designed for police use and consumer markets.

== History ==
"M&P" stands for "Military & Police" and is used to pay homage to the Smith & Wesson .38 Military & Police revolver. According to the company, the .38 Military & Police, now known as the Model 10 revolver, has been in continuous production since 1899, and over six million units have been produced."

The M&P15 was introduced at the 2006 SHOT Show in two varieties: the M&P15 and the M&P15T. Both are essentially the same rifle, chambered in 5.56×45mm NATO, with the T-model featuring folding sights and a four-sided accessories rail fore end. They include the standard direct impingement gas system. In order to decrease cost on the original design, both the dust cover and forward assist were omitted. These rifles were initially produced for Smith & Wesson by Stag Arms, but marked and marketed under the Smith & Wesson name. Currently, Smith & Wesson makes the lower receiver in-house, while the barrel is supplied by Thompson/Center Arms, an S&W company acquired in 2007.

Smith & Wesson's total rifle production has increased through the years since it entered the rifle market. In the past, the company had marketed rifles and shotguns made by other manufacturers, but had not manufactured a long gun in house since World War II when it fulfilled a British military contract. Smith & Wesson re-entered the US long gun market because it was estimated to be 80% larger than the handgun market.

Direct impingement

Short-stroke gas piston

In May 2008, Smith & Wesson introduced their first AR-15 style rifle in a new caliber, the model M&P15R, a standard AR platform rifle chambered for the Russian 5.45×39mm cartridge. This was due to the availability cheap surplus Communist Bloc 5.45mm ammunition and AK-series weapons. It had a 16-inch barrel, 6-position collapsible stock and a stainless-steel 30-round magazine. However, few shooters wanted an expensive AR-15 clone in a non-standard caliber that needed special magazines. As a result, the model was abandoned in 2011 due to poor sales.

== Design ==
The rifle model is based on the Colt AR-15. Smith & Wesson offers the M&P15 semi-automatic rifles in different configurations, tailored to specific shooting applications and styles. The rifle has different models that come chambered in 5.56mm NATO/.223 Remington, .22 Long Rifle, and 5.45×39mm. The barrels come with either a melonite lined or chrome-lined 4140 steel rifling, and 7075 T6 aluminum receiver with a hard-coat black anodized finish.

The Standard model has an adjustable CAR-15 stock and comes with 10-round or 30-round magazine. The Compliant model (designed for the California market) has a CAR-15 stock fixed in the open position (with an overall length of 33.75 inches) and comes with 10-round magazines.

The Smith & Wesson Performance Center target shooting version has an 18-inch bull barrel threaded to take any AR-15/M16-style compensator, a free-floated forend, integral Picatinny rail system and ships with a 10-round magazine.

== Variants ==
Smith & Wesson announced their first short-stroke gas piston action rifle, the M&P15 PS and PSX in January 2009. The M&P15 Sport and M&P15 Whisper were released in 2011. The M&P10 , a version of the AR-10, was introduced in 2013. The M&P15 Sport II was introduced in 2016. It includes additional features of a forward bolt assist and dust cover not found on the original M&P15 Sport model. The M&P15 Sport III was released in 2024. It features a free float handguard and mid length gas system, both not found on previous models.

The M&P15-22 is a blowback-operated, .22 Long Rifle version of the M&P15. It is made with a polymer upper and lower receiver.

The M&P15 Pistol is an AR-15-style pistol that was introduced by Smith & Wesson in December 2020. The M&P15 pistol features a 7.5-inch barrel, a free-float handguard with M-LOK slots, and an SB Tactical SBA3 pistol brace. It is designed to be a direct competitor to other popular AR-15 pistols on the market, including the IWI Zion-15 pistol & the Ruger AR-556 pistol.

== Official users ==
- United States
  - United States Internal Revenue Service, Criminal Investigative Division
  - Las Vegas Metropolitan Police Department
  - Maricopa County Sheriff's Office: M&P15 MOE Mid
  - West Virginia State Police

== Criminal use ==
The Smith & Wesson M&P15 has been used in multiple notable crimes, including:

- During the 2012 Aurora theater shooting, James Eagan Holmes used a .223 Smith & Wesson M&P15 Sport, alongside a smoke grenade, a 12 gauge Remington 870 Express Tactical and a .40 S&W Glock 22 Gen4 to kill 12 people and injure 70 others.
- On December 2, 2015, Syed Rizwan Farook used an illegally transfered .223 Smith & Wesson M&P15 Sport II, alongside a legally purchased 9mm Springfield Armory XD Bi-Tone to murder 14 and injure 24 others on an Islamic terrorist attack, alongside his wife, Tashfeen Malik.
- Nikolas Jacob Cruz used a .223 Smith & Wesson M&P15 Sport II during the 2018 Parkland high school shooting, leaving 17 dead and 17 others injured.
