= Ruger SR-762 =

Model of AR-10 style semi-automatic rifle

- Type: Semi-automatic rifle
- Place of origin: United States

Production history
- Designed: 2009
- Manufacturer: Sturm, Ruger & Co.
- Produced: 2013–2018

Specifications
- Mass: 3.90 kg (8.60 lb)
- Length: 883 mm (34.75 in) (collapsed); 970 mm (38 in) (extended)
- Barrel length: 410 mm (16 in)
- Width: 64 mm (2.5 in)
- Height: 200 mm (8 in)
- Cartridge: .308 Winchester/7.62×51mm NATO
- Barrels: 16 in (0.41 m)
- Action: Gas-operated short-stroke piston, rotating bolt
- Feed system: 10-, 20- or 25-round box magazines
- Sights: Iron sights

The SR-762 is a semi-automatic AR-10-style rifle that was manufactured by Sturm, Ruger & Co. from 2013 to 2018. It is short-stroke piston AR-10, using a similar AR-18 type system than of the original Direct Impingement.

== History ==
Ruger announced on October 17, 2013 on the SR-762 being produced.

By 2018, Ruger had discontinued the SR-762 (along with all of the SR-556 models), as the AR-556 began replacing all SR-556 rifles.

== Design ==
It comes with a patented chrome plated, two stage piston with multistage regulator provides a cleaner, cooler running, reliable firearm with superior operating endurance. Two-stage piston provides a smooth power delivery stroke to the bolt carrier. The round, smooth-sided ergonomic Ruger Lightweight Adaptable handguard with flattop receiver features a Mil-Spec 1913 Picatinny rail at the 12:00 position that extends the full length of the handguard. Drilled and tapped for additional rails at the 3:00, 6:00 and 9:00 positions, offering ample space for mounting sights, lasers, lights and other accessories. There are two additional rail sections included. Folding backup iron sights include a windage adjustable rear sight and an elevation-adjustable front sight. These sights provide a solid aiming system that can be folded out of the way to make room for optics, yet instantly redeployed when duty calls. For accuracy and longevity, the cold hammer-forged 41V45 chromemoly vanadium steel barrel has been precision-rifled and chrome-lined. Barrel is fluted for reduced weight and improved barrel-cooling and features an SR-556/Mini-14-style flash suppressor mounted with a 5/8"-24 thread. Chrome-plated bolt and one-piece bolt carrier with oversized and radiused-rear bearing surface. Six-position telescoping M4 style buttstock is mounted on a Mil-Spec diameter tube. Hogue Monogrip pistol grip. Includes three 20 round magazines, soft sided gun case and three finger-grooved rail covers.

== SFAR ==
Ruger SFAR
- Type: Semi-automatic rifle
- Place of origin: United States

Production history
- Designed: 2022
- Manufacturer: Sturm, Ruger & Co.
- Produced: 2022-2026

Specifications
- Mass: 3.08 kg (6.80 lb) (16 in); 3.31 kg (7.30 lb) (20 in)
- Length: 904 mm (35.60 in) (collapsed) 946 mm (37.25 in) (extended) (16 in); 1,003 mm (39.50 in) (collapsed) 1,048 mm (41.25 in) (extended) (20 in)
- Barrel length: 410 mm (16 in); 510 mm (20 in)
- Width: 64 mm (2.5 in)
- Height: 180 mm (7.2 in)
- Cartridge: .308 Winchester/7.62×51mm NATO; 6.5 Creedmoor
- Barrels: 16 in (0.41 m); 20 in (0.51 m)
- Action: Gas-operated, rotating bolt
- Feed system: 10-, 20- or 25-round box magazines
- Sights: Iron sights

The Ruger Small-Frame Autoloading Rifle (SFAR) is a semi-automatic AR-10-style rifle manufactured by Sturm, Ruger & Co..

== See also ==
- Ruger SR-556
- Ruger AR-556
- Smith & Wesson M&P10
