= Armalite (disambiguation) =

ArmaLite is a type of rifle.

Armalite may also refer to:

- Little Armalite, a song.
- Armalite and ballot box strategy

For types of ArmaLite, see List of ArmaLite rifles and the article ArmaLite itself.

== See also ==
- Armanite, an unrelated term.
