= Black rifle =

Black rifle may refer to:

- ArmaLite AR-15
- Black Rifle Coffee Company
- Colt AR-15
- M16 rifle
- Modern sporting rifle
