= ArmaLite AR-18 =

Type of assault rifle

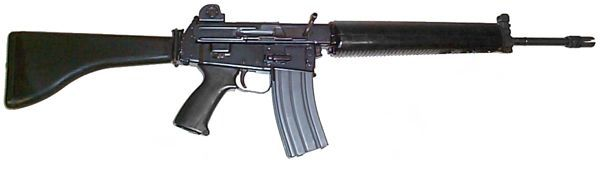
- The ArmaLite AR-18
- Type: Assault rifle Semi-automatic rifle (AR-180)
- Place of origin: United States

Service history
- Used by: See Users
- Wars: Communist insurgency in Malaysia; Lebanese Civil War; The Troubles; Mexican drug war

Production history
- Designer: Arthur Miller; George Sullivan; Charles Dorchester; Eugene Stoner (AR-16 only)
- Designed: 1963
- Manufacturer: ArmaLite (U.S.); Howa (Japan); Elisco Tool / Eagle Arms (Philippines); Sterling Armaments Company (UK)
- Produced: 1969–1985
- No. built: 1,171 (AR-18); 21,478 (AR-180)
- Variants: AR-18K; AR-18S; AR-180; AR-180B; Foreign derivatives based upon the AR-18 include the Singaporean SAR-80, Singaporean/British SAR-87 and the Japanese Howa Type 89; Bullpup adaptations include Australian Bushmaster M17S

Specifications
- Mass: 6.7 lb (3.0 kg) (empty); 7.18 lb (3.3 kg) (loaded w/20 rd. magazine)
- Length: 38 in (970 mm)
- Barrel length: 18.25 in (464 mm) (6-groove rifling)
- Cartridge: 5.56×45mm NATO
- Action: Short-stroke piston, rotating bolt
- Rate of fire: 750 rounds/min
- Muzzle velocity: 3,250 ft/s (991 m/s)
- Feed system: 20, 30, or 40-round detachable box magazine, STANAG magazines (AR-18B)
- Sights: Iron sights or removable 3× scope

The ArmaLite-18 (AR-18) is a gas-operated rifle chambered for 5.56×45mm NATO ammunition. The AR-18 was designed in 1963 at ArmaLite in California as an alternative to the Colt AR-15 design, a variant of which had just been selected by the U.S. military as the M16.

A semi-automatic version known as the AR-180 was later produced for the civilian market. While the AR-18 was never adopted as the standard service rifle of any nation, its production license was sold to companies in Japan and the United Kingdom, and it is said to have influenced many later weapons such as the British SA80, the Singaporean SAR-80 and SR-88, the Belgian FN F2000, the Japanese Howa Type 89 and the German Heckler and Koch G36.

== Background ==
Soon after the adoption of the 7.62×51mm NATO M14 rifle in 1957, the U.S. Army's Continental Army Command (CONARC) began an investigation of small-caliber, high-velocity (SCHV) rifles as an offshoot of the military's existing research program, Project SALVO. ArmaLite and Winchester Arms were solicited by CONARC to provide prototype automatic rifles chambered for high-velocity centerfire .22 rounds. The ArmaLite AR-15 was a scaled-down version of the 7.62mm AR-10, which had appeared too late to be a serious contender against the M14 for adoption by the US Army. Its competitor was the Winchester .224 Light Rifle, a "Carbine" Williams prototype carbine design in a .22 high velocity round which was similar to, but not interchangeable with, the .223 Remington (5.56×45mm). During the protracted U.S. military trials of the AR-15, ArmaLite's corporate owners Fairchild essentially gave up on the design, and sold the AR-15 production rights to Colt. Fairchild also spun off ArmaLite as an independent company, allowing the new owners to buy all of the company's designs except for the AR-10 and AR-15.

When the U.S. military ultimately selected the AR-15 as the M16, ArmaLite could no longer profit from its adoption, and began looking for a new rifle design that they could license for production to military forces. Development on the AR-18 would ultimately begin with the ArmaLite AR-16, chambered in 7.62mm NATO. Eugene Stoner designed the AR-16 in 1959, as he was interested in producing a low-cost alternative to the ArmaLite AR-10 that could be marketed to the militaries of developing nations. Unlike the M16, which was constructed from machined aluminum forgings and built around a modified direct impingement (DI) expanding gas system, the AR-16 was changed to a stamped steel construction and a more conventional SVT-40 pattern short-stroke gas piston. The AR-16 also differed from the AR-10 and M16 in that it had a side-folding wooden buttstock and weighed 8.75 pounds empty (about the weight of a Portuguese contract AR-10); only three examples were ever built. However, the AR-16 was Stoner's final design for ArmaLite, and it never made it out of the prototype stage. This was due largely to Stoner leaving the company in 1961 to go work for Cadillac Gage, where he would later design the Stoner 63. Stoner left ArmaLite shortly before Fairchild divested itself of ownership.

Although Stoner was now gone, ArmaLite was still interested in the AR-16 design to meet the demands of smaller, less developed nations for a less expensive, yet state-of-the-art selective-fire military rifle. Since the 7.62mm rifle market was already oversaturated with FN FALs and Heckler & Koch G3s, ArmaLite decided to revise and scale-down the AR-16 design to 5.56mm. The U.S. military's recent adoption of the M16 had given legitimacy to its 5.56mm cartridge, and ArmaLite sought to develop a competing design chambered in 5.56mm that did not infringe on the Colt license agreement, and could be manufactured by third world countries who could not afford or did not have the advanced aerospace manufacturing infrastructure to license the Colt M16 for domestic production. The 5.56mm was also attractive to ArmaLite because the M16 was the only assault rifle in that caliber at the time, so there was much less competition. Unlike the M16, which used expensive aluminum forgings which then had to be machined with advanced equipment, the AR-16 was designed with a simple stamped steel construction that was then welded together. Such techniques were at the time standard for weapons production. This rifle would eventually become the AR-18, and it was designed by a development team consisting of ArmaLite's new chief designer, Arthur Miller, as well as two other engineers, George Sullivan and Charles Dorchester. Design work on the AR-18 was completed in 1963, and Miller later received U.S. patent 3,246,567 for the rifle in 1969.

== Construction and design ==
Overall, the new AR-18 rifle is much more conventional than previous ArmaLite designs, although it uses the relatively new stamped steel construction from its predecessor, the AR-16. Despite being pioneered by the Germans during WW2 in weapons such as the MP 44, and later adopted for the Soviet AKM, the use of stamped and welded sheet metal components was still uncommon in the manufacture of military rifles in the West in the early 1960s, which had, until then, largely retained the use of traditional machined forgings. Compared to the smooth lines of the AR-15, which had demonstrably finer tolerances in parts fit, the AR-18 faced criticism over its stamped and welded construction. However, the rifle proved to be both reliable and very accurate at all ranges up to 460 metres (500 yards). Its simple construction promised significantly reduced production costs, and allowed it to be license-produced locally on less advanced machinery, potentially reducing dependence on foreign manufacturers.

Short-stroke gas piston

The AR-18's action is powered by a short-stroke gas piston above the barrel. The gas piston is of three-piece design to facilitate disassembly, with a hollow forward section with four radial gas vent holes fitting around a stainless steel gas block projecting rearwards from the foresight housing. The gas is vented from the barrel and travelled via a vent through the foresight housing into the hollow front section of the piston, which causes it to move rearwards a short distance. The rear end of the piston emerges through the barrel extension to contact the forward face of the bolt carrier, causing it in turn to move rearwards. The bolt itself is of similar configuration to the AR-15 with seven radial locking lugs engaging corresponding recesses in the barrel extension, and the extractor in place of the eighth lug. The bolt is moved into and out of the locked position via a cam pin that engaged a helical slot in the bolt carrier, which rides on two metal guide rods (each with its own return spring) instead of contacting the receiver walls, providing additional clearance for foreign matter entering the receiver. Unlike the AR-15, the cocking handle fits directly into a recess in the bolt carrier and reciprocates with it during firing, allowing the firer to force the breech closed or open if necessary. The cocking handle slot has a spring-loaded cover that can be closed by the user to prevent debris entering the receiver, and it will open automatically as the bolt carrier moves rearwards after the first shot. The recoil springs are housed within the receiver, differing from the AR-15 which houses its more elaborate buffer mechanism in the buttstock. The AR-18's compact design allows the use of a side-folding stock with a hinging mechanism (which proved to be less than adequately rigid).

The sights are of similar design and sight picture to those of the AR-15 - a 2-position flip aperture rear sight and post foresight - but the rear sight is made of stampings. A notable change is the use of a more conventional lower sight line closer to the axis of the bore, in contrast to the elevated sights of the AR-15. A dovetail is spot welded to the receiver in front of the rear sight for a proprietary ArmaLite quick-detachable scope mount.

The magazines were of a brand new proprietary design and were different than those of the AR-15. The original magazines made by ArmaLite and Howa were of gray anodized aluminum alloy with black plastic followers and came in 5- and 20-round capacities. (The 5-round magazine, like that of the Colt AR-15 Sporter, was just a full-size 20-round magazine blocked to only hold 5 rounds.) They lacked the magazine catch cutouts of the AR-15 magazines, making them incompatible. Sterling Armaments Company later produced black-enameled steel magazines in 20- 30- and 40-round capacities that did have cutouts and were able to feed from an AR-15. However, the AR-18/AR-180 was never capable of using the Colt AR-15/M16's stock 20- or 30-round STANAG magazines. Gunsmiths have been able to convert AR-15/M16 magazines to feed in the AR-18, though they require modified followers or they will put strain on the bolt catch.

The AR-18 was also designed to use the same standard accessories as the M16. It used a three-pronged flash hider that was similar to that used on the early M16. This was usually replaced by an aftermarket enclosed M16A1 "birdcage"-type model. It could mount the standard M7 bayonet, although it was not available for sale through ArmaLite. "Sporterized" late-production Howa-made AR-180 rifles had extended metal tabs through the mounting lugs to prevent this. A plastic copy of the fixed folding metal bipod issued with the early M-16 was available and came in a similar protective case. AR-180 users were leery of buying a non-adjustable bipod made of thermoset plastic so few were sold, making it a rare accessory today. A padded rifle case that could carry the rifle with the scope mounted was available. It could hold two spare 20-round magazines and the bipod or bayonet in pouches.

Overall, the design is simple and effective with some clever touches; for example the bolt guide rod assembly guides the bolt in the receiver, retains the recoil springs and the rear end of the top handguard, as well as serving as the latch holding the upper and lower receivers together in the closed position. Disassembly is somewhat similar to the AR-15, with the working parts accessed by the rifle pivoting open on a hinge pin immediately forward of the magazine well.

== Production ==
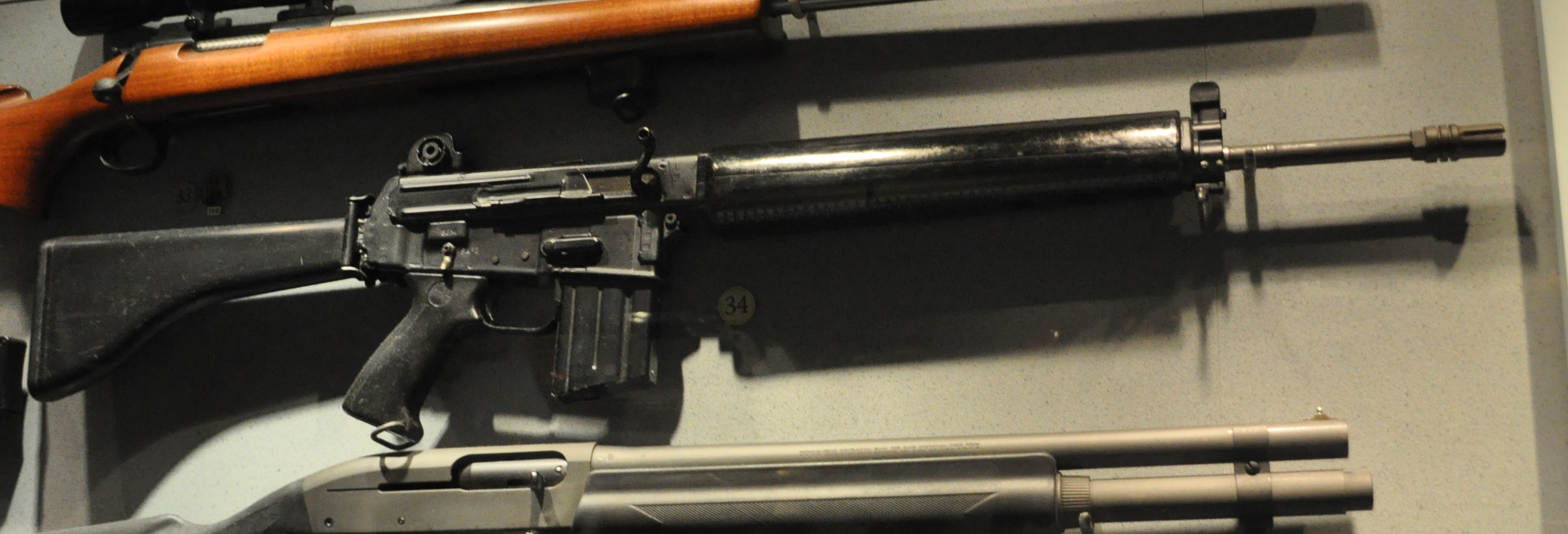
A Sterling Armaments AR-180 on display at the National Firearms Museum

The AR-18 was put into limited production at ArmaLite's machine shop and offices in Costa Mesa, California. A semi-automatic version of the AR-18 known as the AR-180 was later produced for the civilian market between 1969 and 1972. ArmaLite was never equipped to build small arms on a production basis, and the Costa Mesa AR-18 and AR-180 rifles frequently show evidence of hand-fitting. A production license was granted to Nederlandsche Wapen-en Munitiefabriek (NWM) of Den Bosch, the Netherlands, but it is doubtful that any AR-18 rifles were actually produced there. A license to produce the AR-18/180 was then sold to Howa of Japan, and the rifle was produced from 1970 until 1974, when new controls on export of military arms by the Japanese government forced the company to cease all small arms production.

Between 1975 and 1978, there was a brief pause in production as ArmaLite was finalizing an agreement with Sterling Armaments Company, United Kingdom to produce the rifle under license. From 1979 until 1985, Sterling produced the AR-18 and AR-180. In 1983, ArmaLite was sold to Elisco Tool & Manufacturing of the Philippines, which planned to pitch the AR-18 as a replacement for the license-produced M16A1 then in service with the Armed Forces of the Philippines. As a result, production stopped in 1985 as the tooling was sent to the Philippines. Under Elisco several modifications to the design were implemented and twenty (20) prototypes of four designated types (AR 101, AR 102, AR 103, AR 104) were built and underwent testing and evaluation. About 3,500 of these rifles, collectively designated the AR Series 100 were approved for production. Production plans for the AR Series 100 would fail to push through as Elisco would be dissolved and its assets liquidated in the late 1980s.

In mid-1968, ArmaLite set up pilot production in its Costa Mesa plant producing 1,171 AR-18s and 4,018 AR-180s between 1969 and 1972. Howa produced 3,927 AR-180s between 1970 and 1974. Sterling manufactured 12,362 AR-180s between 1979 and 1985. In all, just 21,478 AR-180s were manufactured over 16 years of production between 1969 and 1985.

== Operational use ==
Unlike the AR-15/M16, the AR-18 did not see substantial sales success, and was never officially adopted by any country as its standard service rifle. The reasons for this are unclear, but may have had something to do with the existing sales popularity of the AR-15/M16, as well as the need for additional field testing and evaluation of the Costa Mesa-produced rifles, which were still in the advanced prototype stage. The AR-18 was purchased for evaluation trials by various armed forces, including the United States (1964) and the United Kingdom (1966). These suffered various malfunctions during evaluation trials by various nations.

During the US trials at Aberdeen Proving Ground in 1964, the AR-18's functioning was found to vary from lot to lot of ammunition. The evaluating board concluded that while the basic design of the AR-18 was sound, it required additional minor revisions and changes to improve safety and reliability before it could be considered for adoption as a service rifle. The British Ministry of Defence (MOD) tested the AR-18 in March 1966, and found the design unsatisfactory in performance during mud and sand trials. ArmaLite made several minor production modifications to the design commencing in 1965, and the U.S. Army was directed to re-evaluate the AR-18 at the end of 1969. Testing was conducted at Aberdeen Proving Grounds, conducted by arsenal employees and the Infantry Board at Fort Benning, Georgia. However, American procurement officials were not interested in acquiring yet another 5.56 mm service rifle. A number of deficiencies were listed and the testing authority stated that, although the AR-18 had military potential, it needed further development. In 1968, dissatisfied with efforts to market the AR-18, Arthur Miller left ArmaLite.

Instead, the AR-180 was sold on the civilian market, while the AR-18 sold in small quantities to police and law enforcement organizations, as well as armies and security forces of nations such as Botswana, Haiti, Malaysia and Eswatini.

Others found their way into the hands of paramilitary groups, such as the Provisional Irish Republican Army (IRA) in Northern Ireland, (see also Provisional IRA arms importation). The ArmaLite rifle was for many years the most lethal weapon available to the IRA. For this reason, it became an iconic symbol within that movement. However, some AR-18s that were smuggled from the US were intercepted and captured by the Irish Navy.

An Irish rebel song, "Little Armalite", focuses on the role played by the AR-18 in the Provisional Irish Republican Army campaign. The Armalite company reportedly bought 1000 copies of a recording for its salesmen to distribute. The 1980s Republican political strategy of parallel political and paramilitary campaigns was also christened the "Armalite and ballot box strategy".

== Variants ==
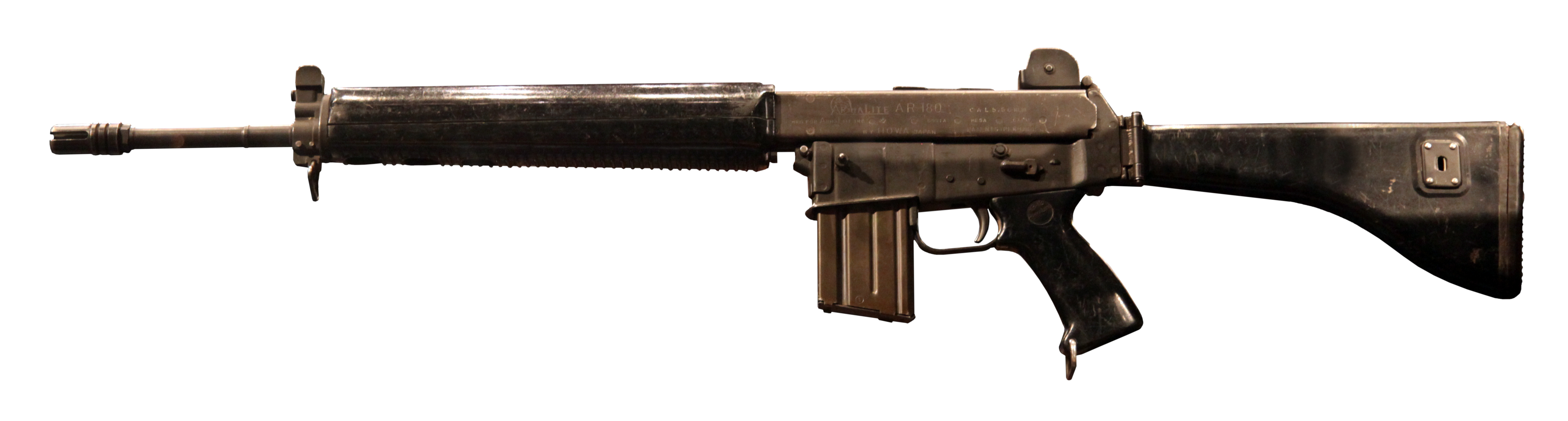
AR-180 variant made by Howa

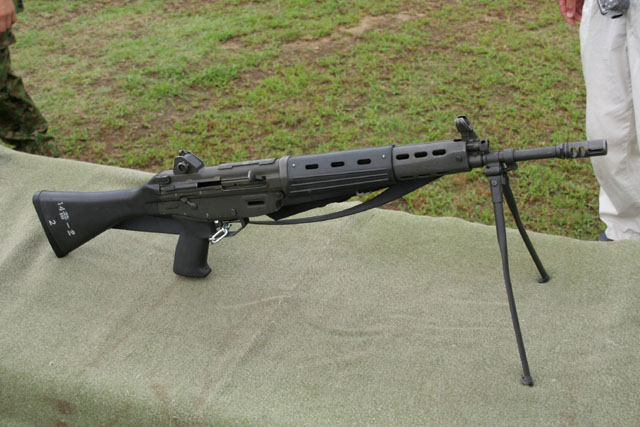
Japanese Howa Type 89 rifle also part of AR-18 variation

The standard AR-18 versions manufactured by ArmaLite, Howa and Sterling differ only in minor details. ArmaLite and Howa rifles have a satin grey phosphate finish, while Sterling rifles sported two finishes; Serial numbers S15001 through S20000 had a black, glossy enamel painted finish. Starting with serial number S20001, a blued finish was used for the remainder of production. Rifles were normally equipped with a sling, cleaning kit (bore/brush), and a knife-type bayonet with scabbard. An optional bipod with a case was available.

The AR-180 is capable of semi-automatic fire only and was externally identical in appearance to the AR-18 with one exception; the selector has only two positions, omitting the third "AUTO" position found on the AR-18. There are minor differences between the variants; to select "FIRE" on the Howa rifles the selector lever must be pivoted 180 degrees from "SAFE" so it is pointing forward towards the muzzle (where "AUTO" would be on a selective-fire rifle), while on the Sterling rifles, the "SEMI" position is the same as the "SEMI" position on a selective-fire rifle; 90 degrees from "SAFE" with the selector lever pointing down. Towards the end of AR-180 production at ArmaLite's Costa Mesa shop in 1972, some unused AR-18 lowers were used to assemble AR-180s. The "SEMI" and "AUTO" positions were scrubbed and the "AUTO" position was relabeled "FIRE". The selector lever on these particular rifles would have to be pivoted 180 degrees from "SAFE" to "FIRE" the same way as Howa manufactured rifles.

Sterling made an AR-180 sporter variant called the "Sharpshooter". It was identical to the regular AR-180 except it came with black neoprene covers for the forend and buttstock. The forend cover gave the shooter a positive gripping surface and the buttstock cover contained a cheekpiece pad to help gain a full cheekweld when shooting.

Sterling manufactured a small number of sporter variants called the AR-180 SCS, of which only 385 were reputed to have been made. It has a large single-piece wooden thumbhole stock that replaces the butt, pistol grip and handguard of conventional versions. The metal parts differ in the lack of the ejection port cover, a PH prefix to the serial number and adapted safety and magazine release controls.

Sterling also manufactured small numbers of a short version, the AR-18S. This version uses the same basic mechanism and folding butt, but has a 257 mm (10.1 in) barrel and a length of 765 mm (30.1 in) with the butt extended. The shortened barrel is fitted with a cone-shaped flash suppressor to address the additional muzzle flash resulting from the short barrel. Some examples have an additional pistol grip fitted to the underside of the handguard.

Sterling had also planned to market a pistol version of the AR-18S to complement the standard AR-180, known as the AR-180SP. A single prototype AR-180SP was completed and submitted to the ATF in 1982 to determine if it was suitable for importation, but it is not known if it was ever approved for import or if any more examples were imported beyond the lone prototype sent to ATF.

A 2.75 × 20 mm telescopic sight was available but few were sold. Early-production models are marked in meters rather than yards and have a different reticle. It is marked "ArmaLite", and has a quick-detachable, see-through mount that attaches to an integral dovetail spot-welded to the top of the receiver. The mount could also feasibly be used with other scopes if they had a 1-inch diameter tube.

- AR-18 - Semi/full-automatic
- AR-180 - Semi-automatic sporting rifle
- AR-180 SCS - Semi-automatic sporting rifle with wooden thumbhole stock
- AR-18S - Semi-automatic short-barrel carbine
- AR-180SP - semi-automatic pistol
- AR-18 LSW - Light Support Weapon (LSW) prototype with a quick barrel change capability and completed a calibre conversion to 7.62×39mm

A delayed-blowback upper was also developed by Ross Rudd using a hesitation lock but not manufactured due to financial backing reasons.

== Later developments ==
The ArmaLite brand was purchased in 1996 by Eagle Arms, a U.S. small arms manufacturer, which adopted the ArmaLite brand for its company. An updated model of the AR-180 was introduced in 2001 as the AR-180B, with a molded polymer lower receiver replacing the stamped steel original. The new lower receiver is combined with the buttstock, which is fixed on the AR-180B, instead of the side-folding butt on the original AR-18 and AR-180. Other AR-180B changes include the use of standard AR-15 trigger group and rear sight parts, a straight cocking handle replacing the earlier cranked style and the deletion of the original AR-18/180 spring-loaded dust cover for the cocking handle slot. The AR-15 magazine release is also used, in contrast to the original AR-18 which had a different magazine release and corresponding slot in the body of the magazine, meaning AR-15 magazines needed a new slot cut to fit properly in the AR-18. As a result, the AR-180B uses standard AR-15/M16 magazines. An AR-180B version with a Picatinny rail was planned for production. In 2007 the AR-180B was discontinued due to poor sales.

There are aftermarket parts to improve the AR-180B. NoDak Spud made a replacement black-anodized aluminum-alloy lower-receiver. StormWerkz made a series of stock adapters compatible with this model of lower receiver to allow the use of fixed or folding AR-180B or AR-15 stocks. StormWerkz also made an adapter that allowed the use of a Picatinny rail that comes in four variants and installs over the dovetail on the top of the receiver.

The Canadian company Wolverine Supplies teamed up with Canadian gunmaker Kodiak Defence to commission the creation of a new AR-180 variant, the WK180-C. The WK180-C does away with the stamped steel and polymer construction of the AR-18, AR-180, and AR-180B, instead, it uses 6061-T6 aluminium to form the upper and lower receivers. This rifle ships with an adaptor to mount AR-15 style stocks (and comes with a collapsible AR15 stock). As Length of pull (LOP) is long with many AR15 stocks, some users have retrofit Cz Vz58 folding stocks to these rifles. While this option works well, it requires the use of lower iron sights and optics.

In 2019 Brownells, Inc. released the BRN-180 complete upper assembly, a new take on the AR-180 design built around the AR-18 short-stroke piston system. The BRN-180 is designed to be fitted to mil-spec AR-15 lower receivers and unlike standard AR-15s the BRN-180 can be fired with the stock folded. The BRN-180 comes with an adjustable gas block and a free-floating modular handguard and is available in 18.5, 16 and 10.5 in (470, 410 and 270 mm) barrel lengths.

== Influence ==
When the AR-18 was designed, a plethora of different methods of gas and recoil operation existed in self-loading intermediate caliber rifles. Since then, self-loading intermediate caliber rifles have converged toward three methods of gas operation. These are: AR-15 style direct impingement, the AK-style long stroke gas piston and the short-stroke gas system found in the AR-18 rifle. While the AK and AR-15 are the first and second most produced intermediate caliber rifles of all time, the AR-18 gas system is the ancestor for the majority of short stroke gas systems found in selective fire military rifles.

The AR-18 mechanism is the basis for many rifles in major military service. Rifles which use a copy or derivative of the AR-18 gas system include: HK G36, HK416, FN F2000, FN-SCAR, Steyr AUG, CZ 805 BREN, FB MSBS Grot, Chinese QBZ-95, HOWA Type 89, SAR-88, T65, T86, T91, T112 and British SA80 family of weapon systems.

In some cases, designs borrow more than just the AR-18's gas system. Successive rifle designs borrow other components such as the bolt carrier group or upper receiver. The HOWA Type 89 is an AR-18, modernized to fit the needs of the Japan Self-Defense Forces. The Singapore SAR-88 utilizes a complete AR-18 upper receiver. Early British SA80 prototypes featured ArmaLite produced AR-18 upper receivers mated to a prototype stamped metal bullpup lower receiver. The finalized SA80 weapon systems use the AR-18 gas system and bolt carrier group. The Remington Adaptive Combat Rifle derives its bolt carrier group from the AR-18.

== Users ==
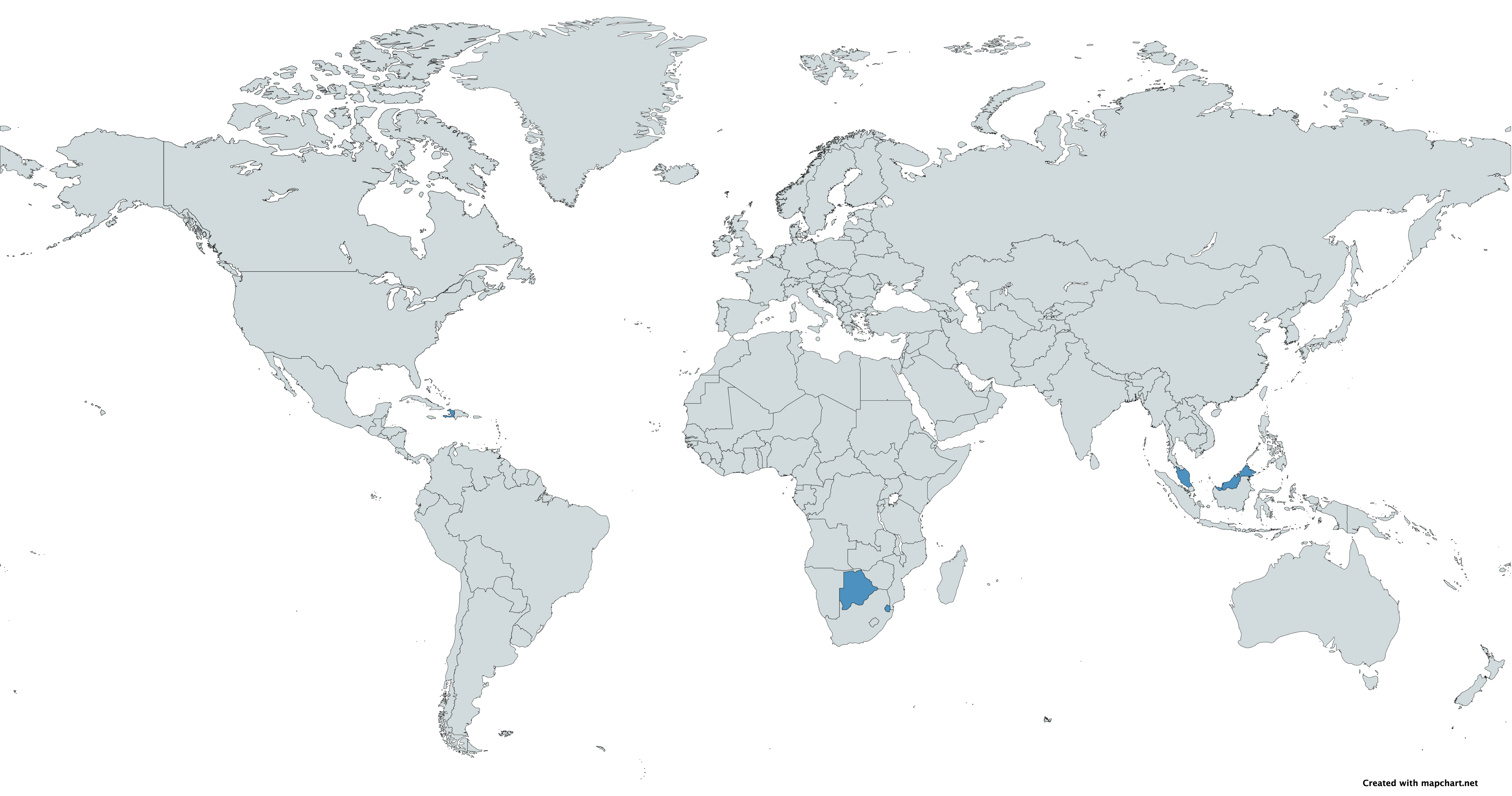
A map with AR-18 users in blue

- Botswana: Cited as part of their National Inventory by Jane's as of 1986.
- Eswatini
- Haiti
- Malaysia: Used by VAT 69 Commando during early phases of the Communist insurgency in Malaysia (1968–1989).
- United States of America: Los Angeles Police Department SWAT (Full Auto AR-18, AR-18S, and AR-180) Notably used during the 1974 shootout with the Symbionese Liberation Army. Also used by New Orleans Police Department during the New Orleans Sniper Case.

=== For trials ===
- Pahlavi Iran: Tested at least two AR-18s for consideration to the Imperial Iranian Army, but was never adopted.

=== Non-state users ===
- Alpha 66
- Grupos de autodefensa comunitaria
- Lebanese Forces militia – Used in small numbers by Commando units.
- Moro National Liberation Front
- Provisional Irish Republican Army and Official Irish Republican Army

== See also ==
- List of ArmaLite rifles
