= ArmaLite AR-30 =

- Type: Bolt-action rifle
- Place of origin: United States

Production history
- Designed: 2000–2002
- Manufacturer: ArmaLite
- Produced: 2003–present
- Variants: AR-30 (2003–2012); AR-30A1 (2013–present)

Specifications
- Mass: 10.1 lb (4.6 kg) (AR-30); 13 lb (5.9 kg) (AR-30A1)
- Length: 42 in (110 cm) (AR-30); 46–48 in (120–120 cm) (AR-30A1)
- Barrel length: 24 in (61 cm) (AR-30); 24–26 in (61–66 cm) (AR-30A1)
- Cartridge: .308 Winchester.300 Winchester Magnum.338 Lapua Magnum
- Action: Bolt action
- Feed system: 5-round detachable magazine
- Sights: Can use any scope with Picatinny railing

The ArmaLite AR-30 is a bolt-action rifle manufactured by Armalite. Based in part on Armalite's AR-50 rifle, the AR-30 is available in three cartridges: .308 Winchester, .300 Winchester Magnum and .338 Lapua. It was introduced at the 2000 SHOT Show.

== Design ==
The AR-30 features a 5-round detachable box magazine. The weight is 12 pounds empty. It includes a 26-inch chrome-moly barrel, 6-groove, RH 1:10-inch twist, and 48 inches overall length. The receiver is modified in octagonal form, drilled, and slotted for a scope rail. The bolt is a dual front locking lug. There is a Shilen standard single-stage trigger with approximately 5 lb. pull. A muzzle brake is optional on the .308 Win. and .300 Win. Mag models; it is standard on the .338 Lapua model. The scope rail is mil-standard with boss to engage cross-slot on the receiver. Stock comes in 3 sections, extruded forend, machine grip frame with vertical grip, forged, and machined removable buttstock. The buttplate is vertically adjustable, specifically built for heavy calibers.

== Variants ==
=== AR-30A1 ===
In November 2012, Armalite announced the introduction of the AR-30A1. The AR-30A1 is completely redesigned and shares few parts in common with the original AR-30. The new A1 model is available in two calibers: .300 Winchester Magnum and .338 Lapua Magnum. Both chamberings are available in a "standard", fixed stock version and a "target" version with a thumb-wheel adjustable stock and enhanced sight and accessory rails. The AR-30A1 replaces the AR-30 in the Armalite product lineup.

=== AR-31 ===
ArmaLite announced the introduction of the AR-31 at the National Association of Sporting Goods Wholesalers Expo in October 2013. The AR-31 is a short-action rifle based on the long-action AR-30A1. The initial rifle offered was chambered in .308 Win, and the rifle will accept AR-10B magazines.

== See also ==
- List of ArmaLite rifles
- Armalite AR-50, .50 caliber rifle
