= ArmaLite AR-50 =

Anti-materiel rifle

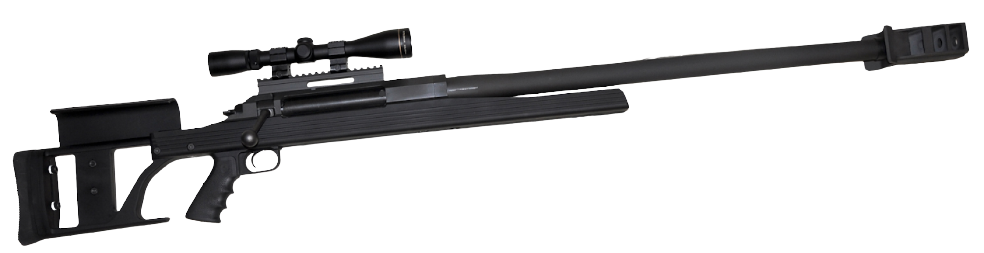
- Type: Anti-materiel rifle
- Place of origin: United States

Production history
- Designed: 1997–2012
- Manufacturer: Armalite
- Produced: 1999–present
- Variants: Armalite AR-30 (smaller caliber)

Specifications
- Mass: 34 lb (15.5 kg)
- Length: 59.5 in (1511 mm)
- Cartridge: .50 BMG.416 Barrett
- Action: Bolt action
- Effective firing range: 1,800 metres (2,000 yd)
- Maximum firing range: 2,430 metres (2,660 yd)
- Feed system: Single-shot

The ArmaLite AR-50 is a .50 BMG, single-shot, bolt-action anti-materiel rifle manufactured by ArmaLite.

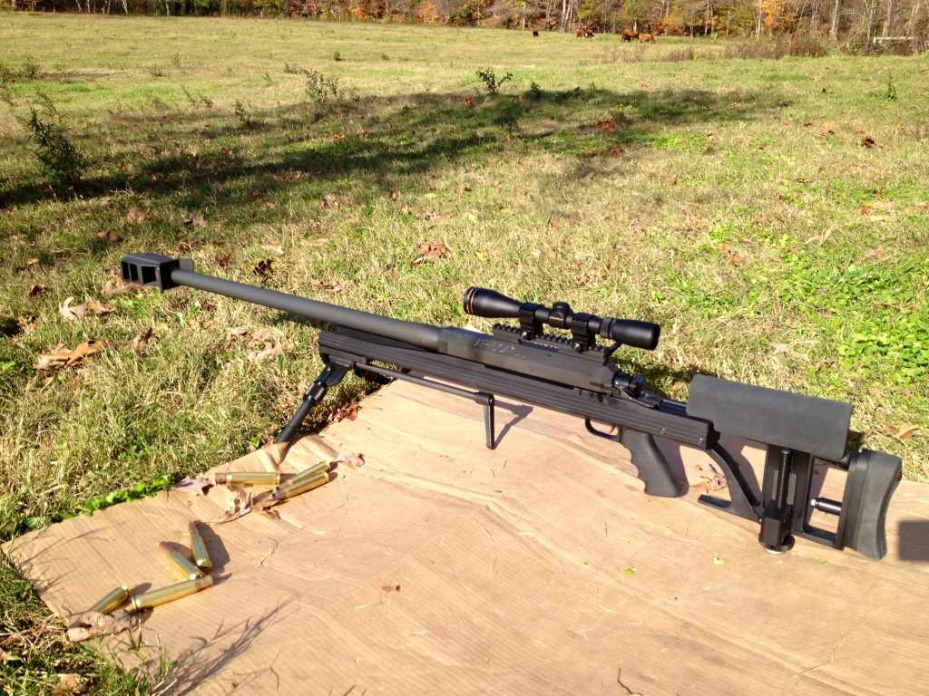
AR50 on display outdoors

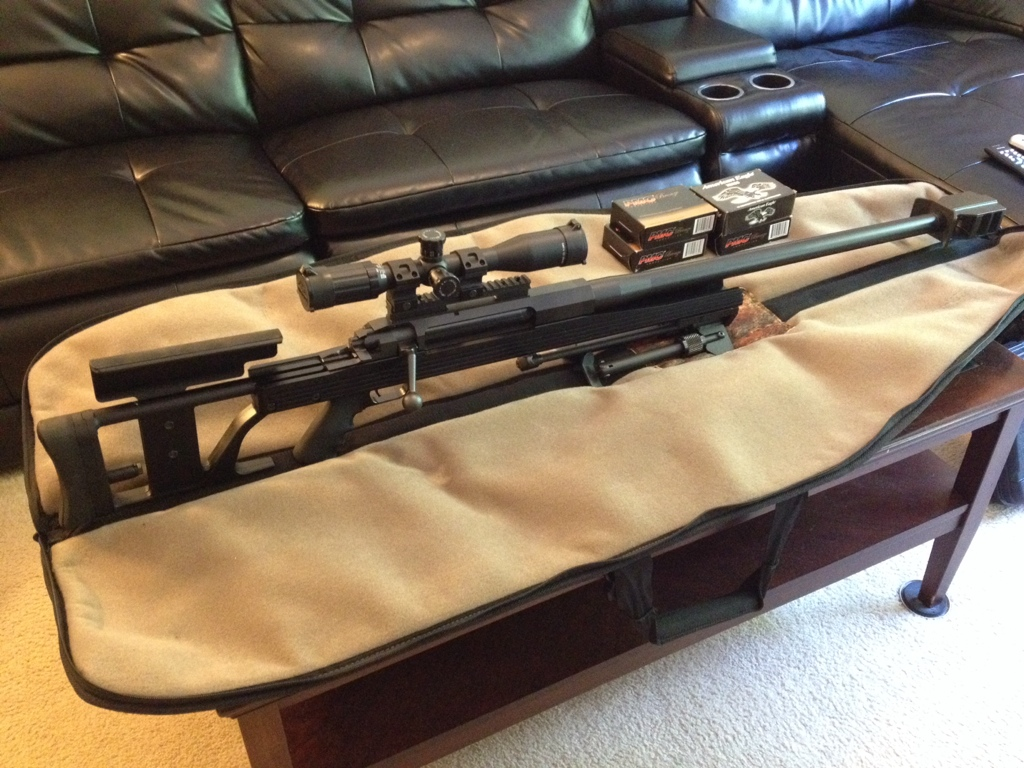
AR50A1B accessorized

== Design ==
The AR-50 rifle utilizes its weight and a large, fluted muzzle brake to reduce recoil. The AR-50 weighs approximately 34 pounds (15 kg) and is a single-shot bolt-action rifle. The barrel is thick and rigid to prevent it from flexing. All AR-50 barrels use 1:15 right hand rifling.

The receiver features Armalite's octagonal design, strengthening the receiver against flexing. The receiver is bedded to the V-shaped stock, while the barrel is free-floated above the forend. The three-piece AR-50 stock is constructed from aluminum. It features an extruded forend and a skeleton butt stock with a removable and vertically adjustable butt plate.

ArmaLite updated the rifle to the AR50-A1B model, which featured a smoother action and a more heavily reinforced muzzle brake. The newer bolt stop could be depressed by hand to release the bolt. The AR50-A1B was designed for long-range shooting, primarily firing the .50 BMG round.

ArmaLite manufactures the rifle in several configurations:

- AR-50A1 chambered for standard .50 BMG
- AR-50A1L, chambered for standard .50 BMG, left-handed version
- AR-50-A1BNM, chambered for standard .50 BMG with refinements for using match grade ammunition
- AR-50-A1B-416, chambered for .416 Barrett

== Advertising ==
The Italian Minister of Culture criticized Armalite in 2014 for running an advertisement depicting Michelangelo's David holding an AR-50A1. The Minister sent a legal notice and urged Armalite to withdraw it. The Italian government holds David's copyright, and Italian law says that "the aesthetic value of the work cannot be distorted", according to the director of the Accademia Gallery. The corporate parent of Armalite, Strategic Armory Corps, issued a statement apologizing for the advertisement, which it said was in "poor taste" and had been dropped.

== See also ==
- List of ArmaLite rifles
