= ArmaLite =

American small arms engineering company and brand

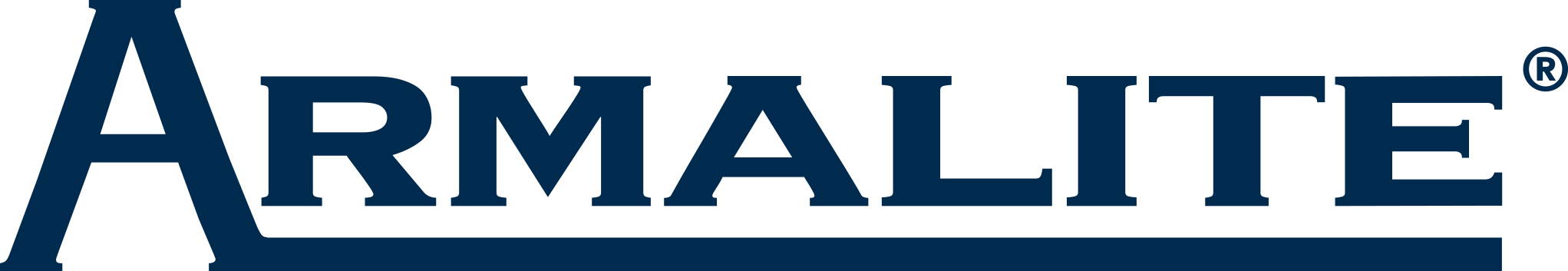
- Type: Subsidiary
- Industry: Arms industry
- Founded: 1954 (original company); 1996 (current company)
- Headquarters: Phoenix, Arizona, U.S.
- Products: Firearms and accessories
- Number of employees: 51–200 (est.)
- Parent: Fairchild Engine and Airplane Corporation (1954–1962); Strategic Armory Corps (2013–present)
- Website: armalite.com

ArmaLite, or Armalite, is an American small arms engineering company, formed in the early 1950s in Hollywood, California. It ceased doing business in the 1980s, though the brand was revived in 1996, by Mark Westrom.

Many of Armalite's products, as conceived by chief designer Eugene Stoner, relied on unique foam-filled fiberglass butt/stock furniture and a composite barrel using a steel liner inside an aluminum sleeve, including the iconic AR-15/M16 family.

Originating as the light firearms division of Fairchild Engine and Airplane Corporation, ArmaLite was formally incorporated in 1954. Stoner's first design, the AR-1 Parasniper (dating from 1952), was relatively unsuccessful. However, in 1956, when ArmaLite competed in a contest for an aircrew survival rifle, its AR-5 and AR-7 designs were put into production and adopted by elements of the US military. In 1957, ArmaLite also competed for the contract for a new main US combat rifle, in the NATO standard 7.62×51mm NATO caliber, with its AR-10. While that bid was unsuccessful, the rifle attracted the attention of both Colt and the Dutch company Artillerie-Inrichtingen, both of which acquired licenses to manufacture the AR-10.

In 1962, Fairchild relinquished its interest in ArmaLite, which continued as an independent company.

The AR-15, chambered for the new, lightweight, high velocity 5.56×45mm NATO round, included features of Stoner's previous designs. Under financial pressure, ArmaLite sold the entire rights to the AR-15 design to Colt, which quickly secured significant US military and law enforcement contracts for the weapon, beginning with the USAF Security Forces (1962). A variant of the Colt product was adopted as the US Army's main combat rifle, from 1964, as the Rifle, Caliber 5.56 mm, M16. By the 1980s, it had also been adopted by the militaries of many US allies, especially within NATO countries. The M16 remained the primary combat rifle of the US military until 2016. Furthermore, its replacements have often been derivatives of the M16 (e.g. the M4 carbine), or other ArmaLite and/or Eugene Stoner designs (e.g. M27–IAR).

ArmaLite had other brushes with success, especially with the AR-18 (also 5.56×45mm NATO). They were not enough to sustain the company and it ceased operations in the early 1980s. The design rights and name were purchased in 1996 by Mark Westrom, who re-launched the company ArmaLite, Inc., headquartered in Geneseo, Illinois, northwest of Peoria. In 2013, Westrom sold ArmaLite, Inc. to Strategic Armory Corps, which owns AWC Silencers, Surgeon Rifles, Nexus Ammo, and McMillan Firearms. SAC was formed to acquire and combine market-leading companies within the firearms industry. In 2014, 3-gun champion Tommy Thacker was appointed president. In 2015, ArmaLite introduced 18 new products, including the AR-10 and the M-15 platform firearms. In mid-2018, ArmaLite moved to Phoenix. As of mid-2023 Strategic Armory Corps and its subsidiaries (including Armalite) relocated headquarters to be based out of Bryan/College Station, Texas.

== History ==
ArmaLite began as a small arms engineering concern founded by George Sullivan, the patent counsel for Lockheed Corporation and funded by Fairchild Engine and Airplane Corporation. After leasing a small machine shop at 6567 Santa Monica Boulevard in Hollywood, Sullivan hired several employees and began work on a prototype for a lightweight survival rifle for use by downed aircrew. On October 1, 1954, the company was incorporated as the ArmaLite Corporation, becoming a subsidiary of Fairchild. With its limited capital and tiny machine shop, ArmaLite was never intended to be an arms manufacturer but instead was focused on producing small arms concepts and designs to be sold or licensed to other manufacturers. While testing the prototype of ArmaLite's survival rifle design at a local shooting range, Sullivan met Eugene Stoner, a talented small arms inventor, whom Sullivan immediately hired to be ArmaLite's chief design engineer. Stoner was a US Marine in World War II and an expert with small arms. Since the early 1950s, he had worked various jobs while building gun prototypes in his spare time. At the time, ArmaLite Inc. was a small organization. As late as 1956, it had only nine employees, including Stoner.

With Stoner as the chief design engineer, ArmaLite quickly released several innovative rifle ideas. The first ArmaLite concept to be adopted for production was the AR-5, a survival rifle chambered for the .22 Hornet cartridge. The AR-5 was adopted by the U.S. Air Force as the MA-1 Survival Rifle.

A civilian survival weapon, the AR-7, was later introduced and chambered in .22 long rifle. The semi-automatic AR-7, like the AR-5, could be disassembled and the components stored in the buttstock. Primarily made of alloys, the AR-7 floats, whether assembled or stored, due to the design of the buttstock which is filled with plastic foam. Several companies have produced the AR-7 and derivative models since their introduction in the late 1950s, including Henry Repeating Arms, of Bayonne, New Jersey, on the Bergen Neck peninsula east of Elizabeth.

ArmaLite engineers spent most of their time and engineering efforts in 1955 and 1956 developing the prototypes for what became the AR-10. Based on Stoner's fourth prototype, Springfield Armory tested two hand-built production AR-10s in late 1956 and again in 1957 as a possible replacement to the venerable yet outdated M1 Garand. The untested AR-10 faced competition from the two other significant rifle designs, the Springfield Armory T-44, an updated M1 Garand design which became the M14, and the T-48, a version of the famous Belgian FN FAL rifle. The T-44 and the T-48 were several years more advanced than the AR-10 in development and trial testing; the T-44 had the additional advantage of being an in-house Springfield Armory design. The US Army eventually selected the T-44 over both the AR-10 and the T-48.

ArmaLite continued to market the AR-10 based on a limited production of rifles at its Hollywood facility. The limited-production, virtually hand-built rifles are "Hollywood" model AR-10s. In 1957, Fairchild/ArmaLite sold a five-year manufacturing license for the AR-10 to the Dutch arms manufacturer Artillerie-Inrichtingen (AI). Converting the AR-10 engineering drawings to metric, AI found the Hollywood version of the AR-10 to be deficient in many respects and made many significant design and engineering changes in the AR-10 that continued throughout the production run in the Netherlands. Firearms historians have separated AR-10 production under the AI license into three identifiable versions of the AR-10: the "Sudanese" model, the "Transitional", and the "Portuguese" model AR-10. The Sudanese version derives its name from its sale to the government of Sudan, which purchased approximately 2,500 AR-10 rifles, while the Transitional model incorporated additional design changes based on experience with the Sudanese model in the field. The final AI-produced AR-10, the Portuguese, was a product-improved variant sold to the Portuguese Air Force for use by paratroopers. While AR-10 production at AI dwarfed that of ArmaLite's Hollywood business, it was still limited as sales to foreign armies proved elusive. Guatemala, Burma, Italy, Cuba, Sudan, and Portugal purchased AR-10 rifles for limited issue to their military forces, resulting in a total production of less than 10,000 AR-10 rifles in four years. ArmaLite never adopted AI's suggested design changes and product improvements.

Disappointed with AR-10 sales, Fairchild ArmaLite decided to terminate its association with AI and instead concentrate on producing a small-caliber version of the AR-10 to meet a requirement for the US Air Force. Using the Hollywood-produced AR-10, the prototype was downsized in dimensions to accept the .223 Remington (5.56 mm) cartridge. That resulted in the ArmaLite AR-15, designed by Eugene Stoner, Jim Sullivan, and Bob Fremont, and chambered in 5.56 mm caliber. ArmaLite also re-introduced the AR-10, this time using a design derived from the original Hollywood prototypes of 1956, and designated the AR-10A. Unable to produce either rifle in quantity, ArmaLite licensed both designs to Colt in early 1959. Also in 1959, ArmaLite moved its corporate offices and engineering and production shop to 118 East 16th Street in Costa Mesa, California next to Irvine.

Frustrated by what it perceived as unnecessary production delays at AI and poor AR-10 sales, Fairchild decided not to renew Artillerie-Inrichtingen's license to produce the AR-10. In 1962, disappointed with ArmaLite's meager profits, primarily derived from licensing fees, Fairchild dissolved its association with ArmaLite.

With the AR-10 and AR-15 designs sold to Colt, ArmaLite was left without a viable major infantry arm to market to potential manufacturers and end users. ArmaLite developed a series of less expensive new rifle designs in 7.62 mm and 5.56 mm. The 7.62 mm NATO rifle was designated the AR-16. The AR-16 and the other newly designed ArmaLites utilized a more traditional gas piston design with stamped and welded steel construction in place of aluminum forgings. Due to the success of the FN FAL, H&K G3, and the US M14, the 7.62 mm AR-16 (not to be confused with the M16) was produced only in prototype quantities. ArmaLite also developed the AR-17, a 5.5-pound, two-shot autoloading shotgun based on the short-recoil principle with aluminum and plastic construction; ArmaLite only produced about 1,200.

In 1963, development began on the AR-18 rifle, a "downsized" 5.56 mm AR-16 with a new gas system utilizing a short stroke gas piston instead of the Stoner direct gas impingement system used on the AR-10 and AR-15. Designed by Art Miller, ArmaLite accompanied the AR-18 with a semi-automatic version, the AR-180. However, the sales success of the AR-15 worldwide to the U.S. military and other nations proved the undoing of the AR-18, and the latter failed to garner substantial orders. In response to criticism of the rifle's performance in trials by the military in the United States and Great Britain, ArmaLite made a few minor improvements to the original design but did little else. ArmaLite manufactured some AR-18 and AR-180 rifles at its Costa Mesa facility and later licensed production to Howa Machinery Company in Japan. However, Japan prohibited the sale of military-style arms to combative nations. With the United States involved in the Vietnam War, production at the Howa plant was limited. ArmaLite then licensed production to Sterling Armaments Company in Dagenham, UK. Sales remained modest. Today, the AR-180 is best known for its use by the Provisional Irish Republican Army in Ireland, who received small quantities of the rifle from black market sources. The AR-18 gas system and rotating bolt mechanism served as the basis for the current British small arms family, the SA80, which came from the XL65, essentially an AR-18 in bullpup configuration. Other designs including the Singapore SAR 80 and German G36, are based upon the AR-18.

A derivative of the AR-16 was the AR-100 series. It came in four variants: the closed-bolt AR-101 rifle and AR-102 carbine, and the open-bolt fired AR-103 carbine and AR-104 light machine gun with ejecting magazines. ArmaLite intended the weapon to increase a squad's firepower and mobility. It was never adopted but led to the Ultimax 100.

By the 1970s, ArmaLite had essentially stopped all new rifle development, and the company effectively ceased operations. In 1983, ArmaLite was sold to the Elisco Tool Manufacturing Company of the Philippines. The AR-18 tooling at the Costa Mesa factory went to the Philippines. At the same time, some of the remaining ArmaLite employees acquired the remaining inventory of parts for the AR-17 and AR-18. Elisco had planned to pitch the AR-18 as a replacement for the license-produced M16A1 then in service with the Armed Forces of the Philippines and such made several modifications to the design. Twenty (20) prototypes of four types (AR 101, AR 102, AR 103, and the AR 104) were built and underwent testing and evaluation. About 3,500 of the rifles, collectively designated the AR Series 100 were approved for production. Production plans for the AR Series 100 failed to be completed as Elisco dissolved and liquidated its assets in the late 1980s.

=== Resurrection of the ArmaLite brand ===
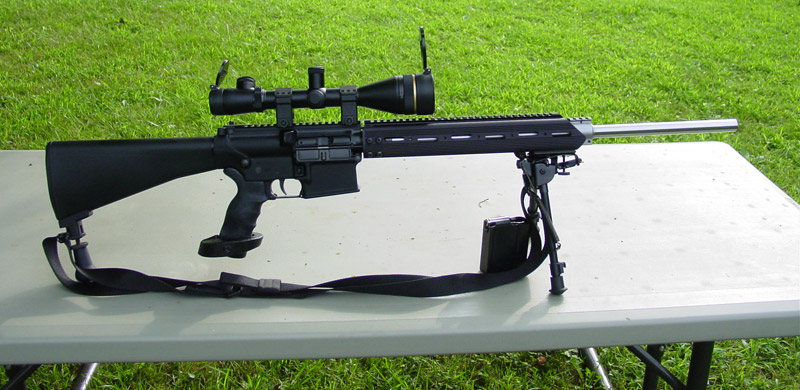
ArmaLite AR-10B

After passing through a series of owners, Mark Westrom, a former U.S. Army ordnance officer and inventor of a 7.62 NATO sniper rifle based on Eugene Stoner's design concepts, purchased the ArmaLite brand name and rampant lion logo in 1996. The company resumed business as ArmaLite Inc. ArmaLite produced some AR-15 and AR-10-based rifles, as well as .50 BMG rifles (the AR-50), and a modified AR-180 named the AR-180B (discontinued in 2009). In the mid-2000s, ArmaLite announced that it was introducing a handgun line including the AR-24 and AR-26 (both pistols also discontinued).

In 2013, Westrom sold ArmaLite, Inc. to Strategic Armory Corps, owner of AWC Silencers, Surgeon Rifles, Nexus Ammo, and McMillan Firearms. Strategic Armory Corps was formed to acquire and combine firearm companies.

== Products ==
=== (1954–1983) ===
- AR-1 "Parasniper", bolt-action rifle (1954 prototype, was not developed further)
- AR-3, 7.62×51mm NATO select-fire battle rifle (prototype, used as a test-bed for rifle design features)
- AR-5, .22 Hornet bolt-action survival rifle (1954–1955), was submitted to replace the Air Force's standard survival rifle
- AR-7 "Explorer",.22 long rifle (.22 LR) semi-auto survival rifle
- AR-9, semi-auto 12-gauge shotgun (1955 prototype, forerunner of the AR-17)
- AR-10, 7.62×51 mm NATO select-fire battle rifle (1955–1959)
- AR-11, .222 Remington select-fire rifle (prototype, smaller version of the AR-3)
- AR-12, 7.62×51 mm NATO select-fire battle rifle
- AR-14, .243 Winchester, .308 Winchester, or .358 Winchester semi-auto sporting rifle (1956)
- AR-15, .223 Remington select-fire rifle (smaller version of the AR-10 and forerunner of the M16 rifle, made from 1956-1959)
- AR-16, 7.62×51 mm NATO select-fire battle rifle (1959–1960)
- AR-17, semi-auto 12-gauge shotgun
- AR-18, .223 Remington select-fire rifle (smaller version of the AR-16, made from 1962–1964)
- AR-180, .223 Remington semi-auto sporting rifle (civilian version of the AR-18)

=== (ArmaLite, Inc. 1996–present) ===
- AR-10B, .308 Win semi-auto rifle (1994–Present)
- AR-10A, .308 Win semi-auto rifle (2006–Present) (re-designed AR-10 - most parts are not compatible with AR-10B)
- AR-10 SuperSASS, .308 Win semi-auto sniper system (2006–Present)
- AR-19, 9mm pistol caliber carbine (20?-Present)
- AR-20, .50 BMG single shot rifle (1998–1999)
- AR-22, blank firing device for the Mk 19 40 mm grenade launcher (1998–2008)
- AR-23, sub-caliber training device for the Mk 19 40 mm grenade launcher (1998–2008)
- AR-24, 9 mm pistol (2006–2012)
- AR-30, .308 Win, .338 Lapua Magnum, .300 WIN MAG bolt-action rifle (1999–2012)
- AR-30A1, .300 WIN MAG, .338 Lapua Magnum bolt-action rifle (2013–present) (re-designed AR-30; most parts are not compatible with AR-30)
- AR-31, .308 Win bolt-action rifle (2013–present)
- AR-50, .50 BMG single-shot rifle (1998–present)
- AR-180B, 5.56 mm semi-auto rifle (2001–2009)
- M-15, 5.56 mm semi-auto rifle (1994–present)

== See also ==
- List of ArmaLite rifles
- List of modern armament manufacturers
- ArmaLite and ballot box strategy
- List of ArmaLite Rifle Owner's Manuals
- List of ArmaLite Rifle Spec Sheets

== Sources ==
- McElrath, Daniel T. (December 10, 2004). "Golden Days At ArmaLite". American Rifleman. National Rifle Association of America.
- Pikula, Sam (Major), The ArmaLite AR-10, Regnum Fund Press (1998), ISBN 9986-494-38-9
- Walter, John (2006). Rifles of the World. Krause Publications. pp. 34–37. ISBN 978-0-89689-241-5.
