= Colt AR-15 =

Autoloading rifle

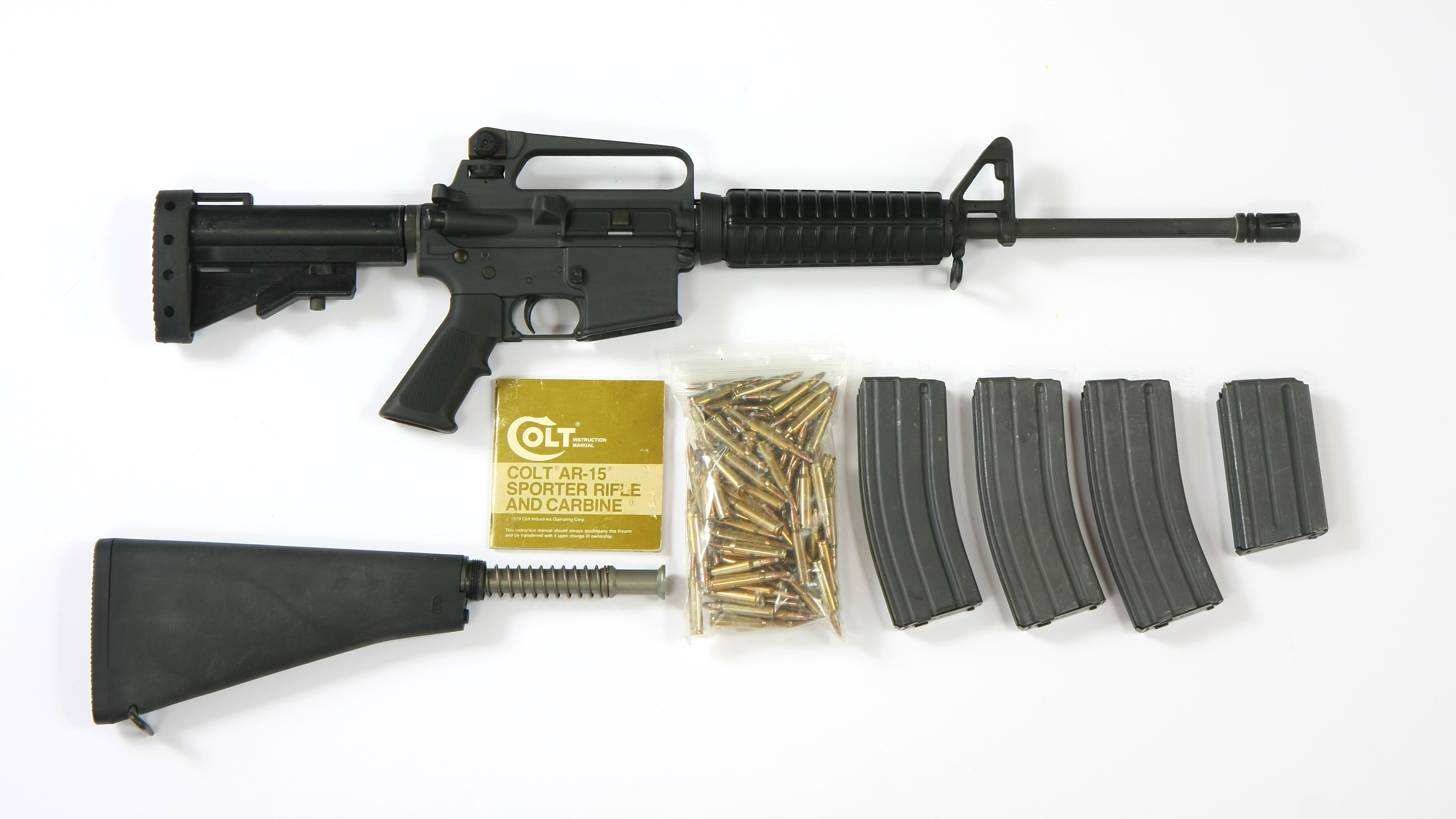
- Complete AR-15A2 rifle set with collapsible and fixed buttstocks, manual, 5.56 mm ammunition, and magazines
- Type: Semi-automatic rifle Automatic rifle
- Place of origin: United States

Production history
- Designer: Eugene Stoner, Jim Sullivan, Bob Fremont
- Manufacturer: Colt
- No. built: 2 million +
- Variants: see List of Colt AR-15 & M16 rifle variants

Specifications
- Barrel length: 20 inches (510 mm) (standard); 16 inches (410 mm) (carbine); 24 inches (610 mm) (target)
- Cartridge: .223 Remington; 5.56×45mm NATO; 9×19mm Parabellum; 7.62×39mm; .222 Remington
- Action: Gas-operated, closed rotating bolt, Stoner bolt and carrier piston
- Effective firing range: ~550 meters (600 yd)
- Feed system: Issued with 5-, 10-, 20- & 30-round STANAG magazines
- Sights: Fixed adjustable front and rear iron sights; Detachable carrying handle with adjustable rear iron sight assembly; Picatinny rails, which allows the use of various scopes and sighting devices

The Colt AR-15 is a product line of magazine-fed, gas-operated, autoloading rifles manufactured by Colt's Manufacturing Company ("Colt") in many configurations. The rifle is a derivative of its predecessor, the lightweight ArmaLite AR-15, an automatic rifle designed by Eugene Stoner and other engineers at ArmaLite in 1956.

Colt currently owns the AR-15 trademark and uses it for its line of semi-automatic AR-15 rifles.

== History ==
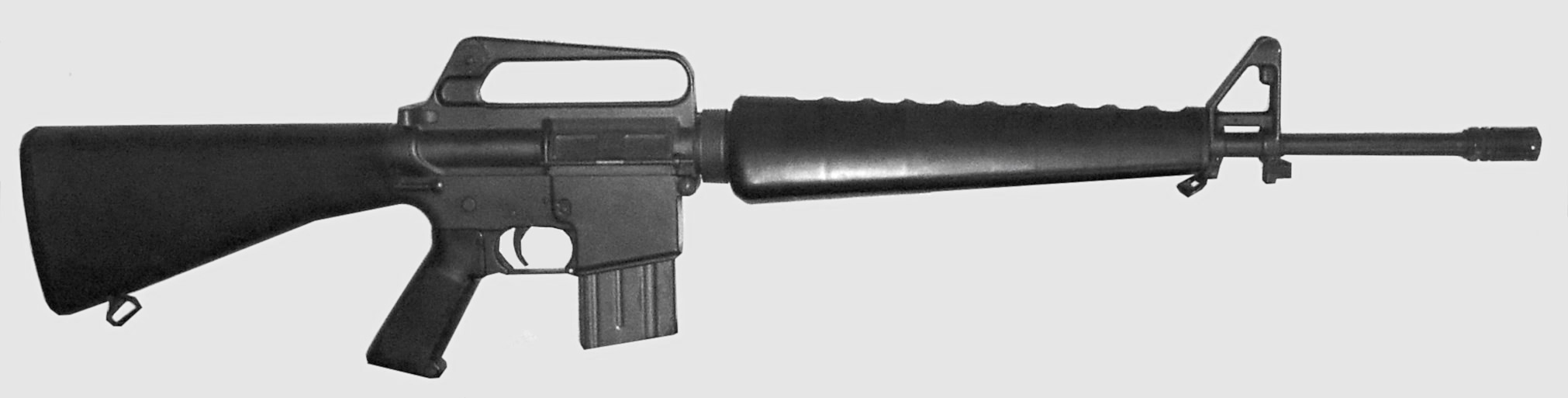
1973 Colt AR-15 SP1 rifle with "slab side" lower receiver (lacking raised boss around magazine release button) and original Colt 20-round box magazine

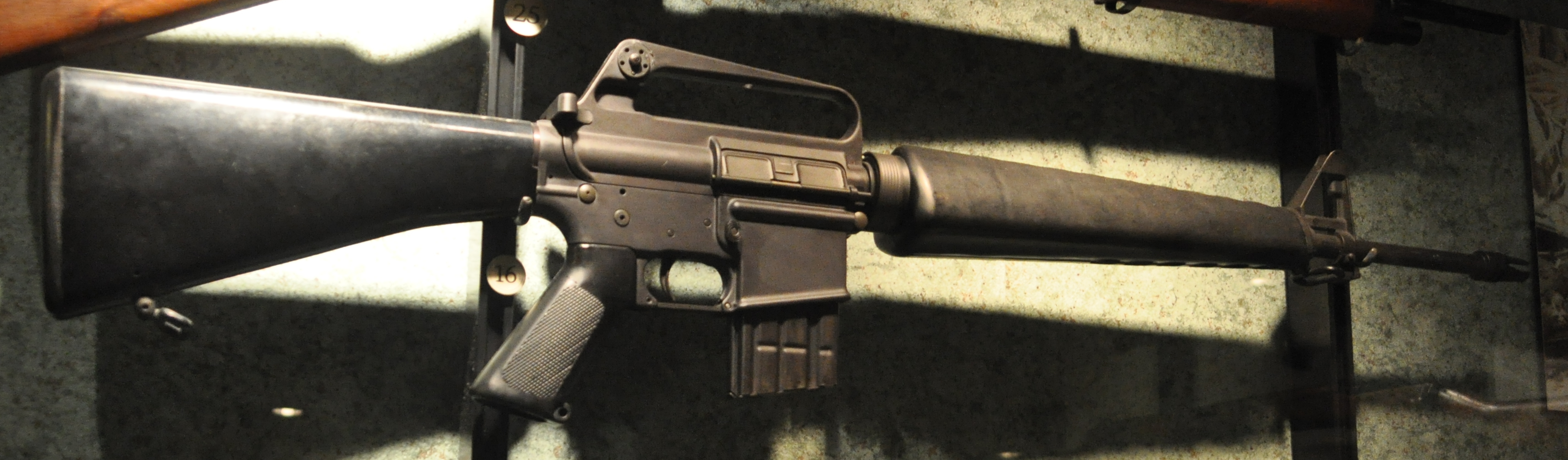
A Colt AR-15 on display at the National Firearms Museum. This example is fitted with an early waffle-patterned 20-round magazine.

Due to financial problems, and limitations in terms of manpower and production capacity, ArmaLite sold the AR-15 design and the AR-15 trademark along with the ArmaLite AR-10 to Colt's Manufacturing Company in 1959. Some of the first sales were of fully automatic Colt AR-15s to the Federation of Malaya and the United Kingdom in 1959. Colt started selling the semi-automatic version of the M16 rifle as the Colt AR-15 in 1964. The first mass production version was the Colt AR-15 Sporter, in .223 Remington, with a 20-inch barrel, issued with 5-round magazines. Colt has since made many different models of AR-15 rifle and carbine models, including the AR-15, AR-15A2, AR-15A3, AR-15A4, and others.

Sale of new AR-15s in the US was banned by the Federal Assault Weapons Ban from 1994 to 2004. Colt and others continued to sell legally compliant versions during that period. On September 20, 2019, Colt announced that it would no longer produce the AR-15 for private use, due to market saturation. It would still produce the AR-15 for police and military units. By May 2020, changed market conditions encouraged Colt to resume production for sales to private users.

== Operating mechanism ==
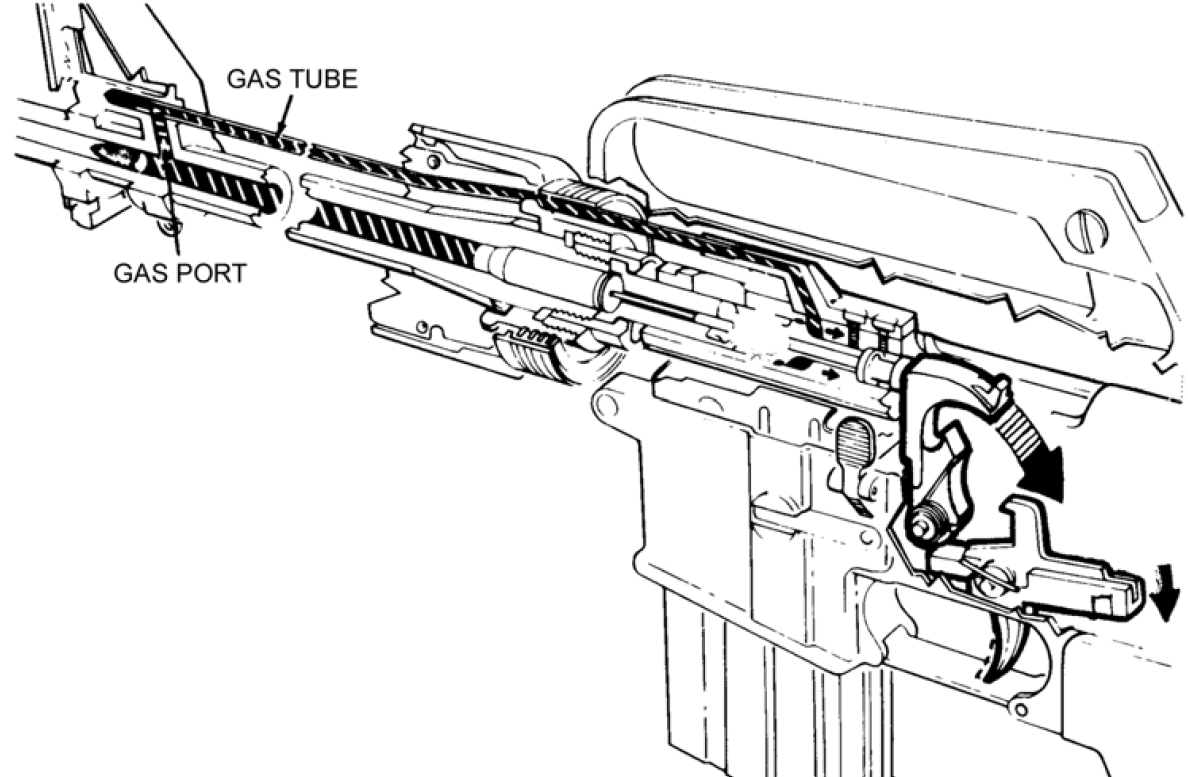
Diagram of an M16 rifle, firing

The 1956 U.S. patent 2,951,424 by Eugene Stoner describes the cycling mechanism used in the Armalite AR-10 rifle that is common with rifles that use the Stoner "Direct Impingement" gas operated bolt and carrier system including Colt AR-15s. The bolt carrier acts as a movable cylinder and the bolt itself acts as a piston. This mechanism is often called "direct gas impingement", although that is now considered to be a misconception. The mechanism is now referred to as an "internal gas piston operating system".

Gas is tapped from the barrel as the bullet moves past a gas port located above the rifle's front sight base. The gas expands into the port and down a gas tube, located above the barrel that runs from the front sight base into the AR-15's upper receiver. Here, the gas tube protrudes into a "gas key" (bolt carrier key), which accepts the gas and funnels it into the bolt carrier.

At this point, the bolt is locked into the barrel extension by locking lugs, so the expanding gas forces the bolt carrier backward a short distance. As the bolt carrier moves toward the butt of the gun, the bolt cam pin, riding in a slot on the bolt carrier, forces the bolt to rotate and thus unlocks it from the barrel extension. Once the bolt is fully unlocked, it begins its rearward movement along with the bolt carrier. The bolt's rearward motion extracts the empty cartridge case from the chamber. As soon as the neck of the case clears the barrel extension, the bolt's spring-loaded ejector forces it out the ejection port in the side of the upper receiver.

Behind the bolt carrier is a plastic or metal buffer, which rests in line with a return spring. The buffer spring begins to push the bolt carrier and bolt back toward the chamber once it is compressed sufficiently. A groove machined into the upper receiver guides the bolt cam pin and prevents it and the bolt from rotating into a closed position. The bolt's locking lugs push a fresh round from the magazine as the bolt moves forward. The round is guided by feed ramps into the chamber. As the bolt's locking lugs move past the barrel extension, the cam pin twists into a pocket milled into the upper receiver. This twisting action follows the groove cut into the carrier and forces the bolt to twist and "lock" into the barrel extension.

== Features ==
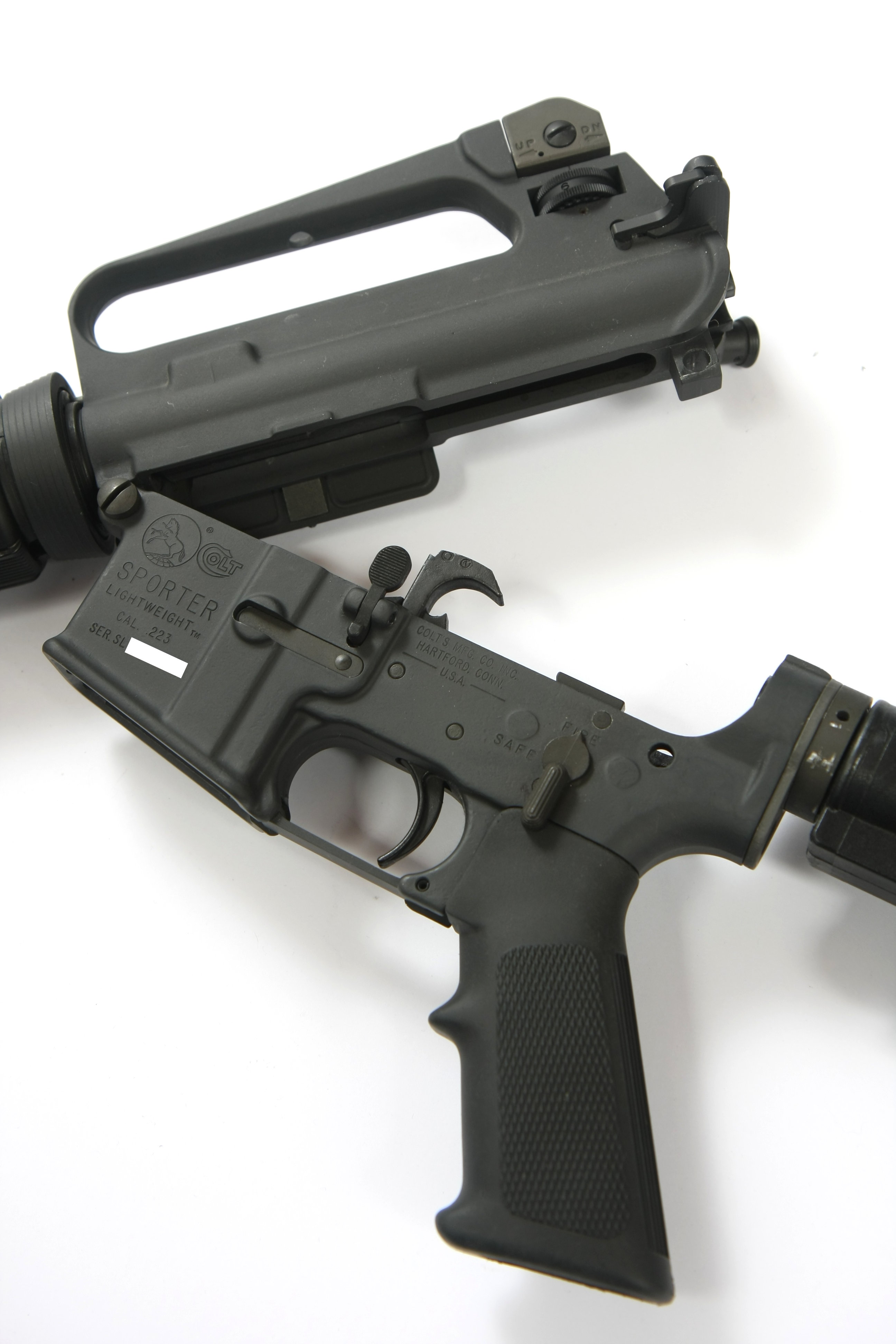
AR-15A2 with the upper and lower receiver opened at the front hinge

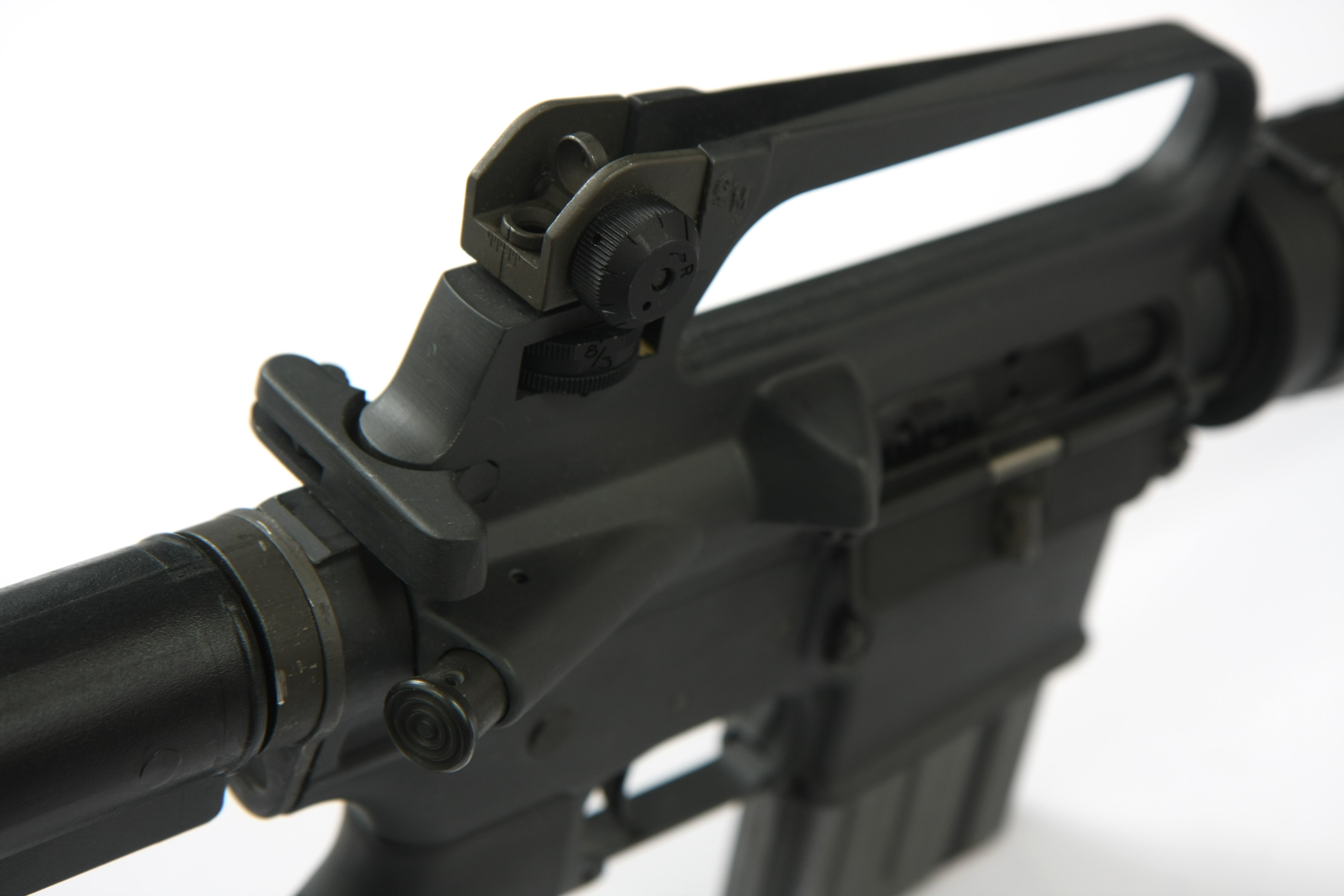
The AR-15A2's most distinctive ergonomic feature is the carrying handle and rear sight assembly on top of the receiver.

=== Upper receivers ===
The upper receiver incorporates the hand guard, the charging handle, the forward assist, the gas operating system, the barrel, the bolt and bolt carrier assembly. AR-15s employ a modular design. Thus one upper receiver can quickly and easily be substituted for another. Upper receivers are available with barrels of different weights, lengths, calibers, and rail systems with various sights and accessories. The standard AR-15 rifle uses a 20-inch (510 mm) barrel. Although, both shorter 16-inch (410 mm) carbine barrels and longer 24-inch (610 mm) target barrels are also available.

Early models had barrels with a 1:12 rate of twist for the original .223 Remington, 55-grain (3.6 g) bullets. Current models have barrels with a 1:9 or 1:7 twist rate for the 5.56×45mm NATO, 62-grain (4.0 g) bullets.

=== Lower receivers ===
The lower receiver incorporates the magazine well, the pistol grip, the buttstock, the buffer and the buffer spring. The lower receiver also contains the trigger, disconnector, hammer and fire selector (collectively known as the fire control group). Full-sized rifles use a fixed buttstock, while carbines generally use an adjustable telescoping buttstock.

The early commercial SP-1 AR-15s used a pair of 0.250-inch (6.4 mm) diameter receiver push pins, identical to those found on the military rifles. In 1966 the company replaced the front pin with a paired nut and screw hinge using a 0.315-inch-diameter (8.0 mm) pin to prevent shooters from being able to change receivers with military rifles or competitor rifles without the use of an adapter. They resumed production with the smaller and standardized 0.250-inch pin in the mid-1990s.

=== Sights ===
The AR-15's most distinctive ergonomic feature is the carrying handle and rear sight assembly on top of the receiver. This is a by-product of the original ArmaLite design, where the carry handle served to protect the charging handle. As the line of sight is 2.5 in (63.5 mm) over the bore, the AR-15 has an inherent parallax problem. At closer ranges (typically inside 15–20 meters), the shooter must compensate by aiming high to place shots where desired. The standard AR-15 rifle has a 500 mm (19.69-inch) sight radius. The AR-15 uses an L-type flip, aperture rear sight and it is adjustable with two settings, 0 to 300 meters and 300 to 400 meters. The front sight is a post adjustable for elevation. The rear sight can be adjusted for windage. The sights can be adjusted with a bullet tip or pointed tool. The AR-15 can also mount a scope on the carrying handle. With the advent of the AR-15A2, a new fully adjustable rear sight was added, allowing the rear sight to be dialed in for specific range settings between 300 and 800 meters and to allow windage adjustments without the need of a tool or cartridge. Current versions such as AR-15A4 have a detachable carrying handle and use Picatinny rails, which allows for the use of various scopes and sighting devices.

=== Muzzle devices ===
Colt AR-15 rifles most often have a barrel threaded in 1/2″-28 threads to incorporate the use of a muzzle device such as a flash suppressor, sound suppressor or muzzle brake. The initial design, the "duckbill," had three tines or prongs and was prone to breakage and getting entangled in vegetation. The design was later changed to close the end to avoid this problem. Eventually, on the A2 version of the rifle, the bottom port was closed to reduce muzzle climb and prevent dust from rising when the rifle was fired in the prone position. For these reasons, the US military declared this muzzle device a compensator, but it is more commonly known as the "GI", "A2", or "Birdcage" muzzle device. The standard AR15 muzzle device conforms to the STANAG dimensional requirements for firing 22 mm rifle grenades.

=== Magazines ===
The Colt AR-15 Sporter was introduced with 5-round magazines, later Colt AR-15 sporter and similar civilian rifles use 20- or 30-round staggered-column detachable box magazines. Low-capacity 5- or 10-round magazines are also available to comply with legal restrictions, for hunting, for benchrest shooting or where a larger magazine can be inconvenient. All military Colt AR-15s, such as those sold to countries such as Malaya and the UK were sold with only 20 round magazines.

=== Comparison to military versions ===
The primary distinction between civilian semi-automatic rifles and military models is select fire. Military rifles were produced with firing modes, semi-automatic fire and either fully automatic fire mode or burst fire mode, in which the rifle fires three rounds in succession when the trigger is depressed. Most components are interchangeable between semi-auto and select fire rifles including magazines, sights, upper receiver, barrels and accessories. The military M4 carbine typically uses a 14.5-inch (370 mm) barrel. Civilian rifles commonly have 16-inch or longer barrels to comply with the National Firearms Act.

In order to prevent a civilian semi-automatic AR-15 from being readily converted for use with the select fire components, Colt changed a number of features. Parts changed include the lower receiver, bolt carrier, hammer, trigger, disconnector, and safety/mode selector. The semi-automatic bolt carrier has a longer lightening slot to prevent the bolt's engagement with an automatic sear. Due to a decrease in mass the buffer spring is heavier. On the select fire version, the hammer has an extra spur which interacts with the additional auto-sear that holds it back until the bolt carrier group is fully in battery, when automatic fire is selected. As designed by Colt the pins supporting the semi-auto trigger and hammer in the lower receiver are larger than those used in the military rifle to prevent interchangeability between semi-automatic and select fire components.

== AR-15 style rifle ==
After Colt's patents expired in 1977, other manufacturers began to copy the design of the Colt AR-15. The term "AR-15" is a Colt registered trademark which it uses only to refer to its line of semi-automatic rifles. Other manufacturers marketed generic AR-15s under other designations, frequently referred to as AR-15s, as are some rifles and carbines not based on the AR-15 design.

AR-15 style rifles are available in a wide range of configurations and calibers from a large number of manufacturers. These configurations range from standard full-size rifles with 20-inch barrels, to short carbine-length models with 16-inch barrels, adjustable length stocks and optical sights, to long range target models with 24-inch barrels, bipods and high-powered scopes. These rifles may also have short-stroke gas piston system, forgoing the direct gas system standard in AR-15 rifles. These calibers include 5.56×45mm NATO, 5.7×28mm, 6.8mm Remington SPC, .300 Blackout, 9×19mm Parabellum and .458 SOCOM to name a few.

== Use in mass shootings ==
A Colt AR-15 Sporter was used in the 1977 Klamath Falls nightclub shooting where there were 7 killed, two injured. From April 28 to 29, 1996, Martin Bryant killed 35 and injured 23 in the Port Arthur massacre, during which he used a Colt AR-15 and a L1A1 SLR chambered in .308 Winchester. It was the worst mass shooting in modern Australian history and resulted in the 1996 National Firearms Agreement. A Colt AR-15 was also used in the Pittsburgh synagogue shooting, in which 11 were killed and 8 were wounded.

== Legality ==
The Colt AR-15 is banned by name in California with a list of additional AR-style and AK-style firearms in the Kasler v. Lockyer Assault Weapons List. This list deems the Colt AR-15, as well as the Armalite AR-15, Bushmaster XM-15, DPMS Panther, and many other AR-pattern rifles as assault weapons by name, thus illegal to own/possess in the state of California.

New Jersey passed its own assault weapon ban in 1990, becoming the second state to ban the firearm by name after California. New Jersey's ban also included any firearm with similar functional or cosmetic features, and many toys and imitations that are aesthetically similar. This legislation is still standing as of March 2023 (with additions to the ban over time).

Connecticut passed its original assault weapon ban in 1993, becoming the third state to ban the firearm by name.

The Federal Assault Weapons Ban was passed by Congress on August 25, 1994, largely mirroring the more restrictive aspects of the legislation found in the three preceding state-level bans. This was a 10-year ban on many firearms by name, including the Colt AR-15. The ban expired on September 13, 2004, in accordance with its sunset clause (which required satisfactory evidence of a positive impact on crime for renewal of the ban).

While the aforementioned federal ban was still active, four states followed suit with assault weapon bans of their own (including Maryland). One state enacted this legislation after the federal ban's expiry. Two states have also enacted restrictions on ownership without specific bans thereof.

Washington, D.C., also has an effective ban on the ownership and possession of the Colt AR-15.

== See also ==
- ArmaLite AR-18 – Type of assault rifle
- CAR-15 – Carbine of the United States
- Colt Automatic Rifle – Full-automatic-only firearm
- Smith & Wesson M&P15 – AR-15 style semi-automatic rifle
- Roberti–Roos Assault Weapons Control Act of 1989 – California legislation regarding assault weapons
- Ruger AR-556 – Semi-automatic rifle by Sturm, Ruger & Co.

== Bibliography ==
- Stevens, R. Blake and Edward C. Ezell. The Black Rifle M16 Retrospective. Enhanced second printing. Cobourg, Ontario, Canada: Collector Grade Publications Incorporated, 1994. ISBN 0-88935-115-5.
- Bartocci, Christopher R. Black Rifle II The M16 Into the 21st Century. Cobourg, Ontario, Canada: Collector Grade Publications Incorporated, 2004. ISBN 0-88935-348-4.
