= Little Armalite =

Irish rebel song

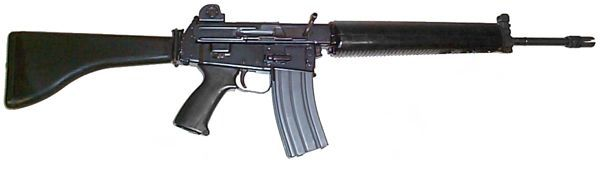
An Armalite AR-18, the subject of the song

"Little Armalite" (also known as "My Little Armalite" or "Me Little Armalite") is an Irish rebel song which praises the Armalite AR-18 rifle that was widely used by the Provisional Irish Republican Army (IRA) as part of the paramilitary's armed campaign in Northern Ireland during the Troubles. One recording of the song, by the Irish band Wolfhound, was released on 7" in 1975.

== Background ==
The song dates from the early 1970s, when the Provisional Irish Republican Army (IRA) illegally imported various forms of weaponry, including the Armalite AR-18 rifle, from the United States. The Armalite AR-18 was for many years the most lethal weapon available to the IRA; for this reason, it became an iconic symbol of the IRA's armed campaign. After the song was released, ArmaLite purportedly purchased 1,000 copies of a recording of it and distributed among their salesmen to boost weapons purchases. Writer Jim Dooley described "Little Armalite" as a "amusing and boastful rallying song". Historian Marc Mulholland described the song as embodying "sentiments of revenge [which] loomed large in the motivations of IRA volunteers".

== Lyrics ==
And it's down Along the Falls Road, that's where I long to be,
Lying in the dark with a Provo company,
A comrade on my left and another on me right
And a clip of ammunition for my little Armalite.

I was stopped by a soldier, he said, You are a swine,
He hit me with his rifle and he kicked me in the groin,
I begged and I pleaded, all my manners were polite
But all the time I'm thinking of me little Armalite.

And it's down in The Bogside that's where I long to be,
Lying in the dark with a Provo company,
A comrade on my left and another on me right
And a clip of ammunition for my little Armalite.

Well, this brave RUC man came marching up our street
Six hundred British soldiers he had lined up at his feet
"Come out, ya cowardly Fenians, come on out and fight".
He cried, "I'm only joking", when he heard the Armalite.

And it's down in Bellaghy that's where I long to be,
Lying in the dark with a Provo company,
A comrade on my left and another on me right
And a clip of ammunition for my little Armalite.

Well, the army came to visit me, 'twas in the early hours,
With Saladins and Saracens and Ferret armoured cars
They thought they had me cornered, but I gave them all a fright
With the armour piercing bullets of my little Armalite.

And it's down in the New Lodge that's where I long to be,
Lying in the dark with a Provo company,
A comrade on my left and another on me right
And a clip of ammunition for my little Armalite.

Well, when Prior came to Belfast to see the battles won,
The generals they had told him "we've got them on the run",
But corporals and privates on patrol at night,
Said 'Remember Narrow Water and the bloody Armalite.'

And it's down in Crossmaglen, that's where I long to be,
Lying in the dark with a Provo company,
A comrade on me left and another on me right
And a clip of ammunition for my little Armalite.

== Notes ==
In older versions of the song, the second last part had said:

"When Tuzo came to Belfast, he said, 'The battle’s won'
Said General Ford 'We’re winning sir, we have them on the run'
But corporals and privates, on patrol at night
Said 'send for reinforcements, it’s the bloody Armalite.'"
