= List of ArmaLite rifles =

An ArmaLite rifle (AR) is one of a series of rifles the ArmaLite company made or, more generally, a rifle based on one of its designs, such as the ArmaLite AR-15 rifle. Eugene Stoner, Jacques Michault, Melvin Johnson, Robert Fremont, and Jim Sullivan are some of the designers credited with their development. In the United States, these rifles are generally known by their model numbers. The AR before the model number stands for "ArmaLite Rifle".

Model number	Model name	Cartridges	Manufacturers	Notes	Image
AR-5	Aircrew survival weapon	.22 Hornet	ArmaLite	A bolt-action, take-down survival rifle.	
AR-7	Explorer	.22 Long Rifle	ArmaLite, Charter Arms, Henry Repeating Arms	A semi-automatic, take-down survival rifle.	
AR-10		7.62×51mm NATO, .308 Winchester	Fairchild ArmaLite, Artillerie Inrichtingen (AI)	A lightweight battle rifle.	
ArmaLite AR-14		Unknown	ArmaLite	A lightweight hunting style rifle that never made it past the prototype phase and according to reports had issues of exploding when fired.	
AR-15		.223 Remington, 5.56 NATO	ArmaLite, Colt's Manufacturing Company	A lightweight assault rifle. A smaller version of the AR-10 and adopted by the United States military as the M16 rifle. Later developed by Colt into a popular semi-automatic Colt AR-15.	
AR-16		7.62×51mm NATO	ArmaLite	Prototype battle rifle.	
ArmaLite AR-17		12 gauge		Semiautomatic 12ga 2shot shotgun based on the earlier AR-9.	
AR-18		5.56×45mm NATO	ArmaLite, Howa Machinery Company, Sterling Armaments Company	An inexpensive, easy to make, stamped steel rifle. Also known as "The Widowmaker" in Northern Ireland.	
AR-180		5.56×45mm NATO	Howa Machinery Company, Sterling Armaments Company	Semi-automatic rifle version of the AR-18.	
AR-100; AR-101; AR-102; AR-103; AR-104		5.56×45mm NATO	ArmaLite, Elitool	AR-100 series based on the AR-16 that used a self ejecting magazine device. Used in development of Ultimax 100 LMG.	
AR-30, AR-30A1, AR-31		.308 Winchester, .300 Winchester Magnum, .338 Lapua	ArmaLite	Bolt-action rifle based in part on the ArmaLite AR-50 rifle.	
AR-50		.50 BMG	ArmaLite	Single-shot, .50 caliber bolt-action sniper and long-range target rifle.	
