= Armalite and ballot box strategy =

Strategy pursued by the Irish Republican Army

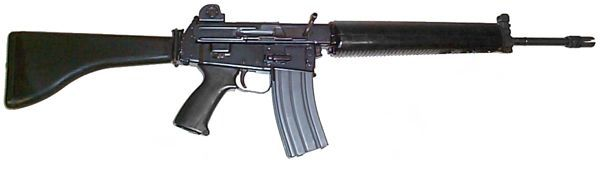
The AR-18

Armalite and ballot box was a political catchphrase used to define the strategy pursued by Irish republicans, from 1981 up until the 1994 IRA ceasefire, by which Sinn Féin ceased its policies of election boycott and abstentionism and instead contested elections in Northern Ireland and the Republic of Ireland, while the Provisional Irish Republican Army (IRA) pursued an armed campaign to end Northern Ireland's status as part of the United Kingdom.

Armalite refers to the AR-15 and AR-18 Armalite rifles. The Armalite corporation initially manufactured both; later Colt did so. The IRA smuggled significant quantities of these rifles into Northern Ireland during the early 1970s, and the "Armalite" became a symbol of republican armed struggle.

== History ==
The strategy emerged after the 1981 Irish hunger strike as a response to the electoral success of Bobby Sands in the April 1981 Fermanagh and South Tyrone by-election and pro-hunger strike campaigners in the Northern Ireland local elections and Republic of Ireland Dáil Éireann elections of the same year. It was first formulated by Sinn Féin organiser Danny Morrison at the party's Ard Fheis (Annual Conference) on 31 October 1981, when he said:

Who here really believes we can win the war through the ballot box? But will anyone here object if, with a ballot paper in this hand and an Armalite in the other, we take power in Ireland?

The strategy was a mixed success. Sinn Féin had a solid core of 9-13 percent of the vote in Northern Ireland, which gave the party some credibility on the international stage. However, at home, it highlighted the non-violent Social Democratic and Labour Party's (SDLP's) dominance in Northern nationalist politics, while Sinn Féin's vote in the Republic remained tiny once the emotion generated by the 1981 hunger strike subsided.

In the longer term, it had two significant political consequences, each of which fed into the emergent Northern Ireland peace process. When the governments of the UK and the Republic of Ireland drafted the Anglo-Irish Agreement, this convinced many in Sinn Féin that it was possible to make political gains without violence. However, Sinn Féin's electoral setbacks, such as the loss of 16 of the party's 59 council seats in 1989, pushed the emphasis of the Republican movement away from the Armalite and towards an election-focused strategy.

On 12 August 1994, just 19 days before the first IRA ceasefire, Danny Morrison declared that the Armalite and Ballot Box approach was over, and stated that "different times require different strategies". By that time, a confidential paper had been released within the IRA and Sinn Féin, referred to as the "TUAS document". The TUAS (Total Unarmed Strategy) set the goal of achieving a wide Irish nationalist consensus among the main nationalist players (Sinn Féin, SDLP and the Republic) with strong international support (especially from the U.S. and the European Union).

== Legacy ==
The Armalite and ballot box strategy has also been cited as having inspired members of the Loyalist Ulster Defence Association such as John McMichael to seek a similar route into electoral politics through vehicles such as the Ulster Loyalist Democratic Party (later Ulster Democratic Party (UDP)). However, parties directly linked to Loyalist paramilitaries had minimal success in elections in Northern Ireland, with the combined electoral share of the UDP and the Progressive Unionist Party (PUP) failing to exceed 1% before the May 1996 elections for the Northern Ireland Forum.

== See also ==
- Four boxes of liberty, a related concept
