= T48 rifle =

Rifle, Caliber .30, T48
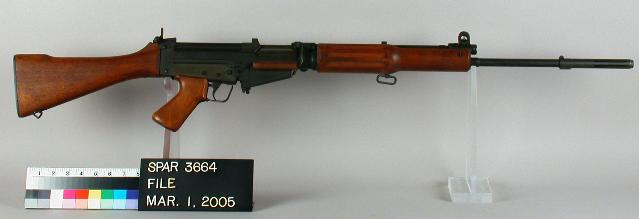
- Type: Battle rifle
- Place of origin: United States and Belgium

Service history
- Wars: See conflicts

Production history
- Designer: Dieudonné Saive
- Designed: 1947–1953 (FN FAL)
- Manufacturer: Fabrique Nationale (FN); Harrington & Richardson (H&R); High Standard Company
- No. built: ~3,200
- Variants: T48E1 HBAR

Specifications
- Cartridge: 7.62×51mm NATO
- Action: Gas-operated, tilting breechblock
- Feed system: 20-round detachable box magazine

The T48 (marked as "Rifle, Caliber .30, T48") was a battle rifle tested by the U.S. military in the mid 1950s during trials to find a replacement for the M1 Garand. It was a license-produced copy of the Belgian FN FAL rifle. The rifle did not enter service, as the U.S. military decided to adopt the M14 rifle instead.

== History ==
In the wake of World War II, the NATO "Rifle Steering Committee" was formed to encourage the adoption of a standardized NATO rifle. The Committee and the US interest in the FAL proved to be a turning point in the direction of the FAL's development. The U.S. and NATO interest in small arms standardization was the primary reason why the FAL was redesigned to use the newly developed 7.62×51mm NATO cartridge, instead of the intermediate cartridge designs originally tested by FN.

Two political factors are worth noting: the U.S. Government tacitly indicated to NATO, and specifically to the United Kingdom, that if the FAL were redesigned for the new American 7.62×51mm cartridge, then the FAL would become acceptable to the U.S., and they would presumably adopt it. Secondly, FN had indicated that it would allow former WWII Allied countries to produce the FAL design with no licensing or royalty costs as a gift to the World War II Allied countries for the liberation of Belgium.

=== Tests ===
The U.S. tested the FAL in several forms; initially as manufactured by FN in experimental configurations, and later in the final T48 configuration as an official competitor for the new Light Self-Loading Rifle intended to replace the M1 Garand. The US Army procured T48 rifles from three firms for testing, including two U.S. based companies in an effort to assess the manufacturability of the FN design domestically. A contract was issued to H&R for 500 T48 rifles.

The T48 was manufactured for testing by Fabrique Nationale (FN), of Herstal, Belgium; Harrington & Richardson (H&R) of Worcester, Massachusetts; and the High Standard Company of Hartford, Connecticut. The United States also received a small number of FAL Heavy Barrel Rifles (HBAR) (either 50.41 or pre-50.41) for testing, under the designation T48E1, though none of these rifles were adopted by US.

The T48/FAL competed head to head against the T44 rifle, basically a product-improved M1 Garand with detachable magazine and select-fire capability. Initial testing proved the T48 and the T44 roughly comparable in performance. In December 1953, both rifles competed in the arctic rifle trials. Springfield Armory, anxious to ensure the selection of the T44, had been preparing and modifying the test T44 rifles for weeks with the aid of the Armory's Cold Chamber, including redesign of the T44 gas regulator and custom modifications to magazines and other parts to reduce friction and seizing in extreme cold. The T48 rifles received no such special preparation, and began to experience gas system problems during the trials. FN engineers opened the gas ports in an attempt to improve functioning, but this caused early/violent extraction and broken parts as a result of the increased pressures. As a result, the T44 was ranked by the arctic test staff as decidedly superior in cold weather operation.

In the end, the T44 was selected over the T48/FAL primarily because of weight (the T44 was a pound lighter than the T48), simplicity (the T44 had fewer parts), the T44's self-compensating gas system, and the argument that the T44 could be manufactured on existing machinery built for the M1 rifle (a concept that later turned out to be unworkable). In 1957, the U.S. formally adopted the T44 as the M14 service rifle.

=== New Production ===
On January 22, 2025, Palmetto State Armory, current owner of the intellectual property including trade-marks of Harrington and Richardson, announced the introduction of a new production run of the T48 rifle for the US civilian market. A near-replica of the original in semi-automatic configuration, the project is being done in cooperation of US commercial FAL producer DS Arms. Production is slated to begin in 2025.

== See also ==
- Armalite AR-16 – (United States)
- M14 rifle – (United States)
- EM-2 rifle – (United Kingdom)
- KAL1 general purpose infantry rifle – (Australia)
- L1A1 Self-Loading Rifle – (United Kingdom)
