= SAR 80 =

Rifle, 5.56 MM, SAR 80
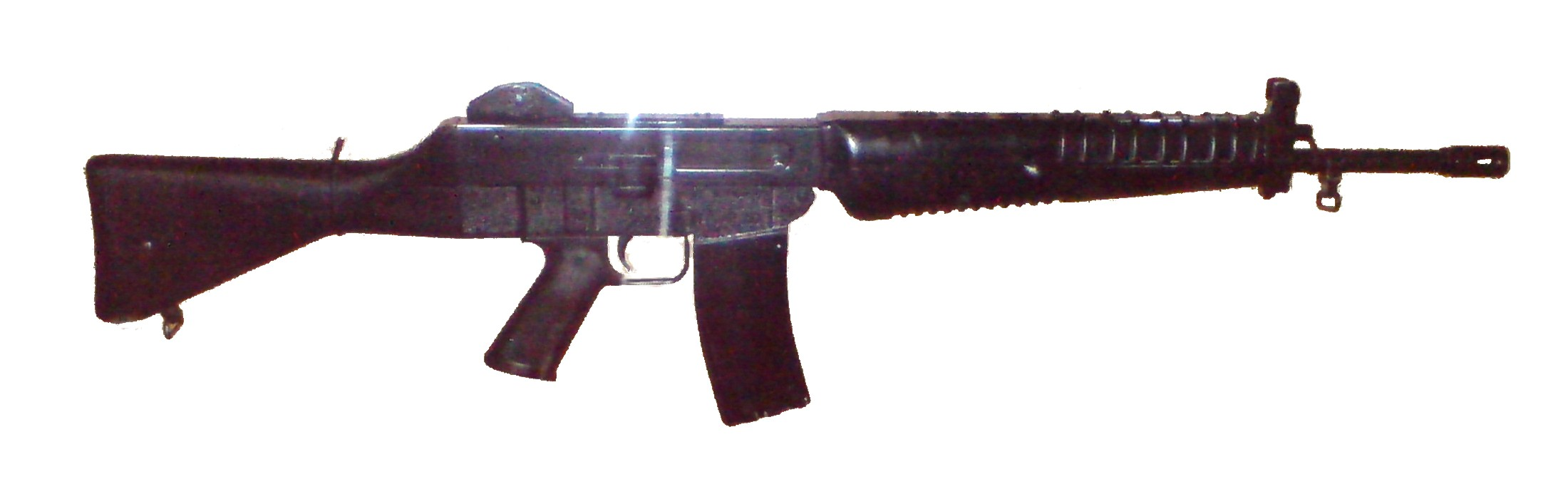
- The SAR 80 assault rifle
- Type: Assault rifle
- Place of origin: Singapore

Service history
- In service: 1984-present
- Used by: See Users
- Wars: Sri Lankan Civil War; Yugoslav Wars; Somali Civil War; Kivu conflict

Production history
- Designer: Frank Waters
- Designed: 1976-1984
- Manufacturer: Chartered Industries of Singapore (CIS, now ST Kinetics)
- No. built: 20,000 for Singapore, unknown number of exports
- Variants: Standard, Grenade launcher

Specifications
- Mass: 3.7 kg (8.2 lb) (empty and without accessories)
- Length: 970 millimetres (38 in), 738 millimetres (29.1 in) with butt folded
- Barrel length: 459 millimetres (18 in)
- Cartridge: 5.56×45mm NATO
- Action: Gas-operated, rotating bolt
- Rate of fire: 600 round/min
- Feed system: Various STANAG magazines
- Sights: Iron sights

The SAR 80 (Sterling Assault Rifle 80) is an assault rifle from Singapore.

== History ==
In the late 1960s, the Singapore Armed Forces (SAF) adopted the AR-15 as their main service rifle. Due to difficulties in obtaining the rifles from the United States, the Singaporean government purchased a license to domestically manufacture the M16 rifle, which was then designated the M16S1. It was introduced in 1967. Despite this restriction, around 10,000 M16S1s were reportedly sold to Manila without meeting approval from Washington DC. Other sales were made to Thailand, which was allowed to proceed with reluctance from DC due to pressure from Thai officials due to concerns on whether Bangkok can assure Washington DC that those M16s won't be sold to another country without permission.

The domestic rifle requirements were not sufficient to allow Chartered Industries of Singapore (CIS, now Singapore Technologies Kinetics) to economically maintain operations at its rifle factory. Export sales of the M16S1 were not a viable option. Due to the requirements of the license agreement, CIS had to request permission from Colt and the US State Department to allow any export sale, which they rarely granted. The only time Singapore received permissions is for export sales to Thailand in 1972.

== Development ==
In the early 1970s, Sterling Armaments Company engineers had developed their own 5.56 mm rifle design, the Light Automatic Rifle (LAR), but this had been shelved when Sterling acquired a manufacturing licence for the US-designed Armalite AR-18 assault rifle. While Sterling could not legally sublicense the AR-18, their AR-18 derived Sterling Assault Rifle (SAR) was available.

This was based on a refined version of the Light Automatic Rifle, fitted with a modified AR-15/m16 style trigger assembly. Notably the full auto trip is moved to the front of the receiver in front of the trigger pin itself. It does not share the AR-!8 stamped fire control group. Sterling licensed the SAR design to CIS, who put it into production as the SAR 80.

The successor to this weapon is the SR-88.

== Users ==
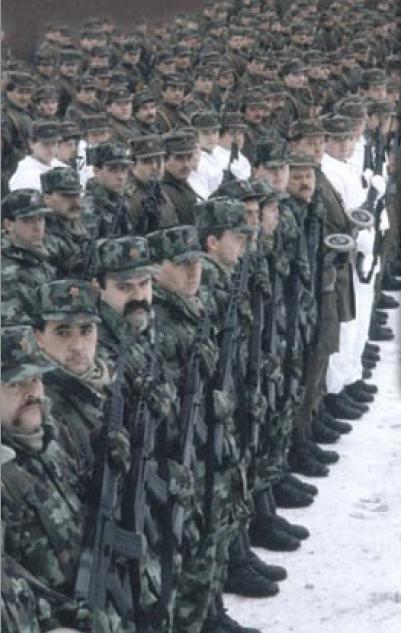
Slovenian Territorial Defence equipped with the SAR 80.

- Central African Republic: Seen in the hands of Central African Gendarmerie.
- Croatia: Croatian Army.
- DR Congo Some used by Democratic Forces for the Liberation of Rwanda in Democratic Republic of Congo
- Papua New Guinea: Papua New Guinea Defence Force.
- Singapore:20,00 rifles delivered to logistic units to supplement M16 and AR-15 rifles already in use. Replaced by the SAR 21 in the mid 2000s.
- Slovenia: Slovenian Army.
- Somalia: Somalia received SAR 80s during the 1980s. Most seen in the Middle East, heavily modified by various forces fighting in the region. 20,000 from Charted Industries of Singapore 1982-83
- Sri Lanka
- Zaire

=== Non state users ===
- Liberation Tigers of Tamil Eelam
