= Armalite AR-16 =

AR-16
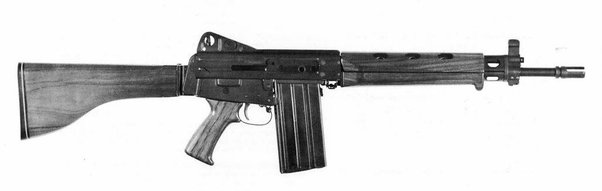
- Type: Battle rifle, Carbine
- Place of origin: United States

Production history
- Designer: Eugene Stoner
- Designed: 1959
- Manufacturer: ArmaLite
- Produced: 1959 to early 1960s
- Variants: See Variants

Specifications
- Mass: 8.75 pounds (3.97 kilograms) (Standard); 6.6 pounds (3.0 kilograms) (Carbine)
- Length: 44.5 inches (113 centimetres) (Standard); 36.9 inches (94 centimetres) (Carbine)
- Barrel length: 20 inches (51 centimetres) (Standard); 18.3 inches (46 centimetres) (Carbine)
- Caliber: 7.62×51mm NATO
- Action: Gas-operated, rotating bolt
- Rate of fire: 650 rpm
- Feed system: 20-round box magazine

The AR-16 was an American battle rifle produced by ArmaLite.

== History ==
The AR-16 was developed shortly after ArmaLite's previous rifle, the AR-15. It was designed by Eugene Stoner in 1959 and unlike the AR-15, it was not intended for domestic use by the US Army; it was instead marketed towards emerging nations with a limited industrial base. The 7.62×51mm cartridge was selected for the AR-16.

In a marketing ploy, ArmaLite also emphasized that the machine tools used to produce the gun could be re-purposed for agricultural and office purposes. The AR-16 was briefly marketed in the early 1960s but never entered full production due to a lack of sales. There was very little interest in the design, as countries were largely satisfied with the FN FAL. In order to adapt to the changing market, ArmaLite redesigned the weapon in 5.56mm; this evolved into the ArmaLite AR-18. Plans were made for several variants, including a 9mm submachine gun and a civilian sporting rifle, but ultimately, only a carbine variant was ever made.

== Design ==
The AR-16 was a gas-operated, selective-fire rifle that utilized a rotating bolt. In order to facilitate for ease of production, the design of the rifle was kept relatively simple and it was made from inexpensive sheet metal pressings. The only machined components were the barrel, bolt carrier, and a pair of brackets. The bolt, extractor, and flash hider could be machined but this was inessential. The carbine model of the AR-16 featured a folding stock.

== See also ==
- L1A1 Self-Loading Rifle – (United Kingdom)
- T48 rifle – (United States)
- CETME rifle – (Spain)
- Heckler & Koch G3 – (Germany)
