= SR 88 =

Type of assault rifle

- Type: Assault rifle
- Place of origin: Singapore

Service history
- In service: 1984–2000
- Used by: See users
- Wars: Bougainville conflict Solomon Islands conflict

Production history
- Designer: Chartered Industries of Singapore (CIS, now ST Kinetics)
- Designed: 1978
- Manufacturer: • CIS: 1982–2000
- Produced: • SR 88: 1988-1995 • SR 88A: 1990-2000
- Variants: See variants

Specifications
- Mass: • SR 88: 3.68 kg (8.11 lb) • SR 88A/Carbine: 3.7 kg (8.16 lb)
- Length: • SR 88: 912 mm (35.9 in) • SR 88A: 960 mm (37.8 in) • SR 88A Carbine: 810 mm (31.9 in)
- Barrel length: 460 mm (18.1 in)
- Cartridge: 5.56×45mm NATO
- Caliber: 5.56 mm (0.22 in)
- Barrels: Single barrel (progressive RH parabolic twist, 6 grooves)
- Action: Gas-operated long-stroke piston, rotating bolt
- Rate of fire: • SR 88: 750 rounds/min • SR 88A: 800 rounds/min
- Feed system: 30-round STANAG Magazine
- Sights: Iron sights

The SR 88 (Singapore Rifle 88) is an assault rifle designed and manufactured in Singapore by Chartered Industries of Singapore (CIS, now ST Kinetics).

== History ==
Following the poor sales of the SAR 80, and with their involvement with the Sterling SAR-87, CIS came up with an improved design – the new SR 88. Many of the parts and mechanisms are similar to its predecessor. Later production models were further improved with higher quality materials including a new handguard and buttstock, this version was designated the SR 88A.

The SR 88A was built in two versions, the standard model and the latest carbine model which is a heavy-duty mil-spec version with a shorter barrel and a retractable butt-stock popularly called today as the "baby ultimax" because of its overall shorter length and function and frame similarities with the Ultimax 100. Its magazine catch will accept a regular M16 magazine and a C-mag which is also used in M16 rifles.

== Design ==
It uses long-piston-stroke, gas-operated action with a rotating bolt. The gas piston and gas cylinder are chromium-plated. The gas system features a three position gas regulator – two open positions, for normal and harsh conditions, and one closed for launching of rifle grenades.

The barrel is equipped with flash hider, which also serves as a rifle grenade launcher. The lower receiver is an aluminium forging, and the upper receiver is made from stamped steel.

Furniture (stock, pistol grip, handguards) is made from plastic materials. The standard stock is of fixed type, but the SR 88 is also available with a side-folding stock. The side-folding carrying handle is mounted at the forward end of the receiver.

== Variants ==
SR 88
Standard rifle variant.
SR 88A
Improved variant of above.
SR 88A Carbine
Carbine variant for use by paratroopers.

== Users ==
- Bhutan: Royal Bodyguard of Bhutan
- Papua New Guinea: Papua New Guinea Defence Force and Royal Papua New Guinea Constabulary with the SR88A.
  - Bougainville: Used by Bougainville Revolutionary Army. Captured from Papua New Guinea Defence Force.
- Philippines: Philippine Marine Corps Rifles donated by Bangko Sentral ng Pilipinas to the PMC.
- Singapore: Singapore Armed Forces.
- Slovenia: Slovenian Armed Forces.
- Solomon Islands
  - Royal Solomon Islands Police Force
  - Malaita Eagle Force
- Somalia
- Sri Lanka: SR-88A variant used by Sri Lanka Army and Special Task Force
