= ArmaLite AR-15 =

American assault rifle

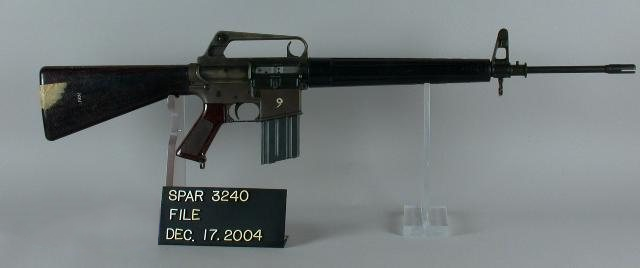
- ArmaLite AR-15 with 25-round magazine
- Type: Assault rifle (Note: The original ArmaLite AR-15 is unique among all rifles using the "AR-15" trademark, in that it is capable of selective fire and is an assault rifle. All other AR-15 style rifles are semi-automatic-only and descend from the civilian version, the Colt AR-15.)
- Place of origin: United States

Service history
- In service: 1962–1963
- Wars: Vietnam War; Indonesia–Malaysia confrontation (Note: Used by Indonesian forces.)

Production history
- Designer: Eugene Stoner (AR-10); L. James Sullivan; Bob Fremont
- Designed: 1956
- Manufacturer: ArmaLite; Colt's Manufacturing Company
- Produced: 1959–1964

Specifications
- Mass: 6.55 lb (2.97 kg) unloaded 7.30 lb (3.31 kg) with 20-round magazine
- Length: 39 in (991 mm)
- Barrel length: 20 in (508 mm)
- Cartridge: .223 Remington
- Action: Gas-operated, closed rotating bolt, Stoner bolt and carrier piston
- Muzzle velocity: 3,300 ft/s (1,006 m/s)
- Effective firing range: 500 yd (457 m)
- Sights: Iron sights

The ArmaLite AR-15 (Note: The AR prefix is short for ArmaLite rifle.) is a gas-operated assault rifle manufactured in the United States between 1959 and 1964. Designed by American gun manufacturer ArmaLite in 1956, it was based on its AR-10 rifle. The ArmaLite AR-15 was designed to be a lightweight rifle and to fire a new high-velocity, lightweight, small-caliber cartridge to allow infantrymen to carry more ammunition.

In 1959, ArmaLite sold its rights to the AR-15 to Colt due to financial difficulties and limitations in terms of manpower and production capacity. After modifications (most notably, the charging handle was re-located from under the carrying handle like AR-10 to the rear of the receiver), Colt rebranded it the Colt 601, however, it still carried the Armalite markings due to contractual obligations to Armalite/Fairchild Aircraft Co. Colt marketed the redesigned rifle to various military services around the world and was eventually adopted by the U.S. military in January 1962 and subsequently designated as M16 rifle in December 1963, which went into production and service in 1964.

Colt continued to use the AR-15 trademark for its line of semi-automatic-only rifles marketed to civilian and law-enforcement customers, known as Colt AR-15. The Armalite AR-15 is the parent of a variety of Colt AR-15 and M16 rifle variants.

== History ==
After World War II, the United States military started looking for a single automatic rifle to replace the M1 Garand, M1/M2 Carbines, M1918 Browning Automatic Rifle, M3 "Grease Gun" and Thompson submachine gun. However, early experiments with select-fire versions of the M1 Garand proved disappointing. During the Korean War, the select-fire M2 Carbine largely replaced the submachine gun in US service and became the most widely used Carbine variant. However, combat experience suggested that the .30 Carbine round was under-powered. American weapons designers concluded that an intermediate round was necessary, and recommended a small-caliber, high-velocity cartridge.

However, senior American commanders having faced fanatical enemies and experienced major logistical problems during WWII and the Korean War, insisted that a single powerful .30 caliber cartridge be developed, that could not only be used by the new automatic rifle, but by the new general-purpose machine gun (GPMG) in concurrent development. This culminated in the development of the 7.62×51mm NATO cartridge.

The United States Army then began testing several rifles to replace the obsolete M1 Garand. Springfield Armory's T44E4 and heavier T44E5 were essentially updated versions of the Garand chambered for the new 7.62×51mm NATO round, while Fabrique Nationale submitted their FN FAL as the T48, and the British submitted their EM-2 rifle. ArmaLite entered the competition late, hurriedly submitting several AR-10 prototype rifles in the fall of 1956 to the United States Army's Springfield Armory for testing.

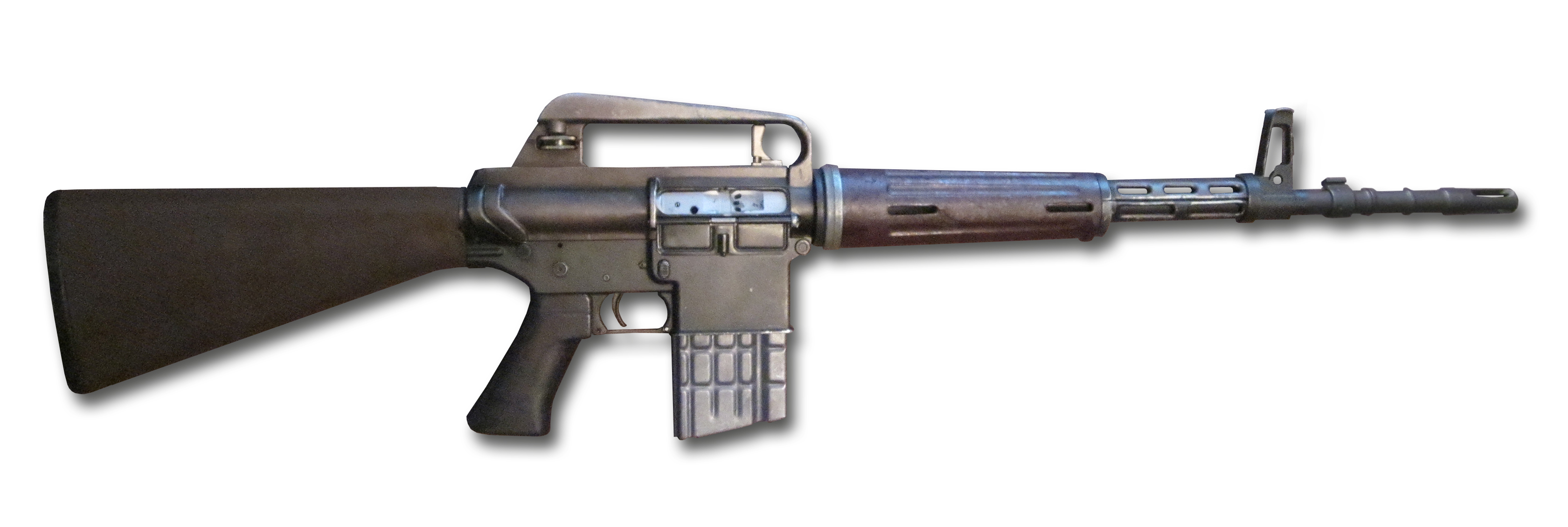
ArmaLite AR-10 made by Artillerie Inrichtingen (A.I.)

The ArmaLite AR-10 featured an innovative combination of a straight-line barrel/stock design, a new patent-filed gas-operated bolt, forged aluminum alloy receivers and with phenolic composite stocks resulting in a small arm significantly easier to control in automatic fire than other infantry rifles of the day. It had rugged elevated sights, an oversized aluminum flash suppressor and recoil compensator, and an adjustable gas system. The final prototype, featured an upper and lower receiver with the now-familiar hinge and takedown pins, and the charging handle was on top of the receiver placed inside of the carry handle. For a 1950s 7.62×51mm NATO rifle, the AR-10 was incredibly lightweight at only 6.85 pounds (3.11 kilograms) empty. Initial comments by Springfield Armory test staff were favorable, and some testers commented that the AR-10 was the best lightweight automatic rifle ever tested by the Armory.

In the end, the United States Army chose the T44, which entered service as the M14 rifle, which was an improved M1 Garand with a 20-round magazine and automatic fire capability. The U.S. also adopted the M60 general purpose machine gun (GPMG). Its NATO partners adopted the FN FAL and HK G3 rifles (Note: The British briefly adopted an intermediate cartridge weapon, the EM-2 rifle before the FN FAL for standardisation), and the FN MAG and Rheinmetall MG3 GPMGs.

The first confrontations between the AK-47 and the M14 came in the early part of the Vietnam War. Battlefield reports indicated that the M14 was uncontrollable in full-auto and that soldiers could not carry enough ammo to maintain fire superiority over the AK-47. While the M2 Carbine offered a high rate of fire, it was under-powered and ultimately outclassed by the AK-47. A replacement was needed: a medium between the traditional preference for high-powered rifles, such as the M14, and the lightweight firepower of the M2 Carbine.

=== Scaling down the ArmaLite AR-10 ===
As a result, the Army was forced to reconsider a 1957 request by General Willard G. Wyman, commander of the U.S. Continental Army Command (CONARC), to develop a .223 caliber (5.56 mm) select-fire rifle weighing 6 lb (2.7 kg) when loaded with a 20-round magazine. The 5.56mm round had to penetrate a standard U.S. M1 helmet at 500 yards (460 meters) and retain a velocity in excess of the speed of sound, while matching or exceeding the wounding ability of the .30 Carbine cartridge. This request ultimately resulted in the development of a scaled-down version of the ArmaLite AR-10, called the ArmaLite AR-15 rifle.

In 1958, ArmaLite submitted ten AR-15s and one hundred 25-round magazines for CONARC testing. The tests found that a five to seven man team armed with AR-15s had the same firepower as an 11-man team armed with M14s and soldiers armed with AR-15s could also carry three times more ammunition than those armed with M14s (649 rounds vs. 220 rounds). The AR-15 was found to be three times more reliable than the M14 rifle. However, General Maxwell Taylor, then Army Chief of Staff, "vetoed" the AR-15 in favor of the M14. In 1959, ArmaLite—now frustrated with the lack of results and suffering ongoing financial difficulties—sold its rights to the AR-10 and AR-15 to Colt.

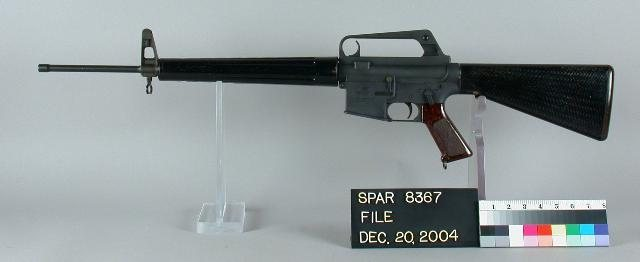
Early ArmaLite AR-15 without flash hider or magazine

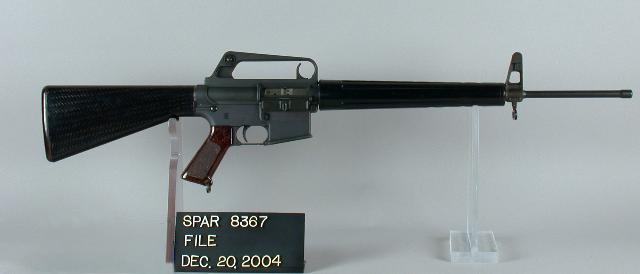
Early ArmaLite AR-15 without magazine or flash hider

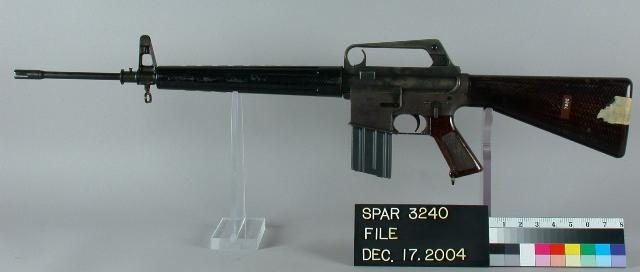
ArmaLite AR-15 with 25-round magazine and flash hider

=== Colt era ===
After acquiring the AR-15, Colt promptly redesigned the rifle to facilitate mass production. Colt then renamed and rebranded the rifle "Colt ArmaLite AR-15 Model 01". After a Far East tour, Colt made its first sale of Colt ArmaLite AR-15 rifles to Malaya on September 30, 1959. Colt manufactured their first batch of 300 Colt ArmaLite AR-15 rifles in December 1959. Colt would go on to market the Colt ArmaLite AR-15 rifle to military services around the world.

In July 1960, General Curtis LeMay, then Vice Chief of Staff of the United States Air Force, was impressed by a demonstration of the AR-15 and ordered 8500 rifles. In the meantime, the Army would continue testing the AR-15, finding that the intermediate cartridge .223 (5.56 mm) rifle is much easier to shoot than the standard 7.62×51mm NATO M14 rifle. In 1961 marksmanship testing, the U.S. Army found that 43% of AR-15 shooters achieved Expert, while only 22% of M14 rifle shooters did so. Also, a lower recoil impulse, allows for more controllable automatic weapons fire.

In the summer of 1961, General LeMay was promoted to Chief of Staff of the United States Air Force and requested an additional 80,000 AR-15s. However, General Maxwell D. Taylor, now Chairman of the Joint Chiefs of Staff, (who repeatedly clashed with LeMay) advised President John F. Kennedy that having two different calibers within the military system at the same time would be problematic and the request was rejected. In October 1961, William Godel, a senior man at the Advanced Research Projects Agency, sent 10 AR-15s to South Vietnam. The reception was enthusiastic, and in 1962, another 1,000 AR-15s were sent. United States Army Special Forces personnel filed battlefield reports lavishly praising the AR-15 and the stopping-power of the 5.56 mm cartridge and pressed for its adoption.

By intentionally choosing a slow twist rate the 55 grain bullet used in the 5.56 Ball M193 cartridge was only just stable in flight. The damage caused by the 5.56 mm bullet was originally believed to be caused by instantaneous "tumbling" on impact and render a wide, incapacitating wound due to the slow 1 in 14-inch (360 mm) rifling twist rate. However, any pointed lead core bullet will "tumble" after penetration in flesh, because the center of gravity is towards the rear of the bullet. The large wounds observed by soldiers in Vietnam were actually caused by bullet fragmentation, which was created by a combination of the bullet's velocity and construction. These wounds were so devastating that the photographs remained classified into the 1980s.

However, despite overwhelming evidence that the AR-15 could bring more firepower to bear than the M14, the Army opposed the adoption of the new rifle. U.S. Secretary of Defense Robert McNamara now had two conflicting views: the USAF's (General LeMay's) repeated requests for additional AR-15s and the ARPA report favoring the AR-15, versus the Army's position favoring the M14. Even President Kennedy expressed concern, so McNamara ordered Secretary of the Army Cyrus Vance to test the M14, the AR-15 and the AK-47. The Army reported that only the M14 was suitable for service, but Vance wondered about the impartiality of those conducting the tests. He ordered the Army Inspector General to investigate the testing methods used; the Inspector General confirmed that the testers were biased towards the M14.

In January 1963, Secretary McNamara received reports that M14 production was insufficient to meet the needs of the armed forces and ordered a halt to M14 production. At the time, the AR-15 was the only rifle that could fulfill a requirement of a "universal" infantry weapon for issue to all services. McNamara ordered its adoption, despite receiving reports of several deficiencies, most notably the lack of a chrome-plated chamber.

After minor modifications, the new redesigned rifle was renamed the "Rifle, Caliber 5.56 mm, M16". Meanwhile, the Army relented and recommended the adoption of the M16 for jungle warfare operations. However, the Army insisted on the inclusion of a forward assist to help push the bolt into battery in the event that a cartridge failed to seat into the chamber. The Air Force, Colt and Eugene Stoner believed that the addition of a forward assist was an unjustified expense. As a result, the design was split into two variants: the Air Force's M16 without the forward assist, and the "XM16E1 (AKA: M16A1)" with the forward assist for the other service branches.

In November 1963, McNamara approved the U.S. Army's order of 85,000 XM16E1s; and to appease LeMay, the Air Force was granted an order for another 19,000 M16s. In March 1964, the M16 rifle went into production and the Army accepted delivery of the first batch of 2129 rifles later that year, and an additional 57,240 rifles the following year.

The Colt ArmaLite AR-15 was discontinued with the adoption of the M16 rifle. Most AR-15 rifles in U.S. service have long ago been upgraded to M16 configuration. The Colt ArmaLite AR-15 was also used by the United States Secret Service and other U.S. federal, state and local law enforcement agencies.

Shortly after the United States military adopted the M16 rifle, Colt introduced its line semi-automatic-only Colt AR-15 rifles, which it markets to civilians and law enforcement. Colt continues to use the AR-15 name for these rifles.

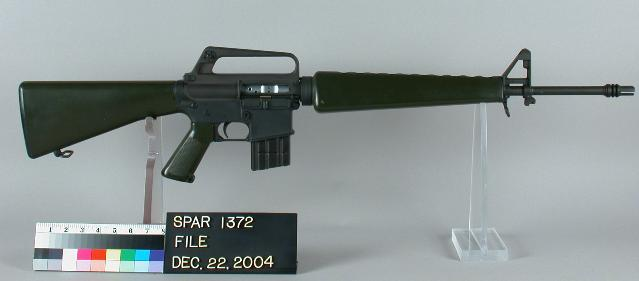
Colt ArmaLite AR-15 Model 01 with 20-round magazine

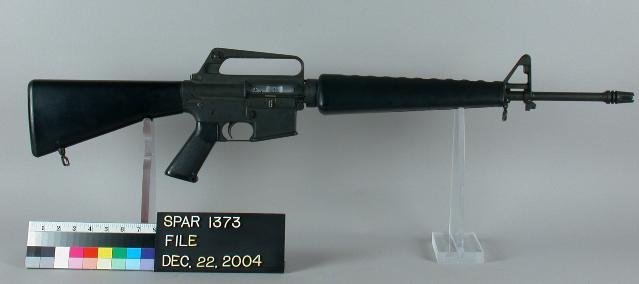
Colt ArmaLite AR-15 Model 02 without magazine and new 1 in 12-inch (300 mm) rifling twist rate

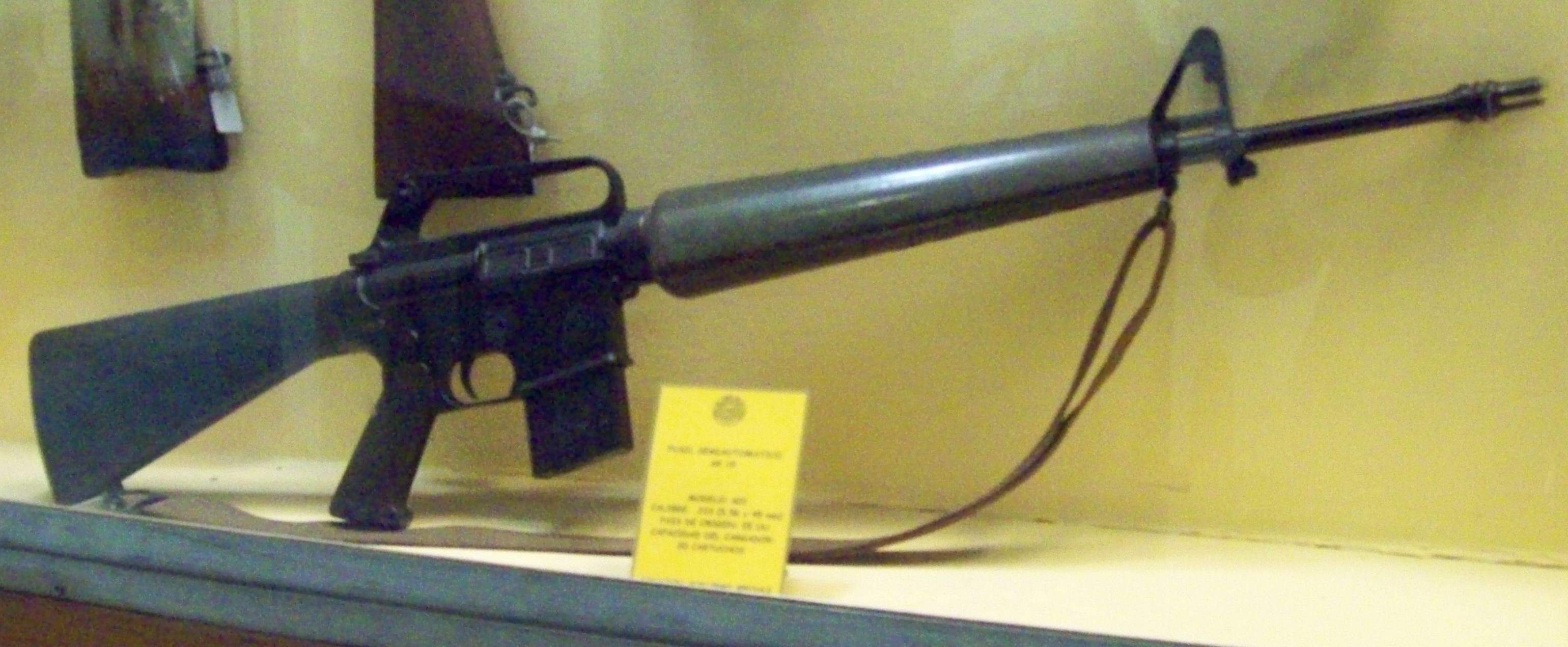
An early M16 rifle without forward assist

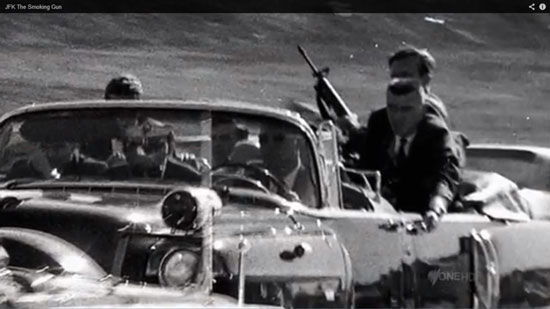
Secret Service agent George W. Hickey with an ArmaLite AR-15 Model 01 moments after President Kennedy was shot in Dallas on November 22, 1963

=== Colt ArmaLite AR-15 (Model 601 and 602) ===
Colt's first two models produced after the acquisition of the rifle from ArmaLite were the 601 and 602, and these rifles were in many ways clones of the original ArmaLite rifle (in fact, these rifles were often found stamped Colt ArmaLite AR-15, Property of the U.S. Government caliber .223, with no reference to them being M16s).

The 601 and 602 are virtually identical to the later M16 rifle without the forward-assist. Like the later M16 rifle their charging handle was re-located from under the carrying handle like AR-10 to the rear of the receiver. They were equipped with triangular fore-stocks and occasionally green or brown furniture. Their front sight had a more triangular shape. They had flat lower receivers without raised surfaces around the magazine well. Their bolt hold open device lacked a raised lower engagement surface and had a slanted and serrated surface that had to be engaged with a bare thumb, index finger, or thumb nail because of the lack of this surface. Their fire-selector was also changed from upward = safe, backward = semi-auto and forward = full-auto, to the now familiar forward = safe, upward = semi-auto, and backward = full-auto of the M16 rifle.

The only major difference between the 601 and 602 is the switch from the original four grooves, right-hand 1:14-inch (1:355.6 mm or 64 calibers) rifling twist rate to the more common four grooves, right-hand 1:12-inch (1:304.8 mm or 54.8 calibers) twist. This was done as the original 1:14-inch twist rate to just stabilize the 55 grain bullet used in the 5.56 Ball M193 cartridge under unfavorable conditions could induce too much yaw and due to the resulting excessive in flight bullet destabilization become inaccurate. The one turn in 12 inches increased accuracy and was optimized to adequately stabilize the M193 ball and longer M196 tracer bullets.

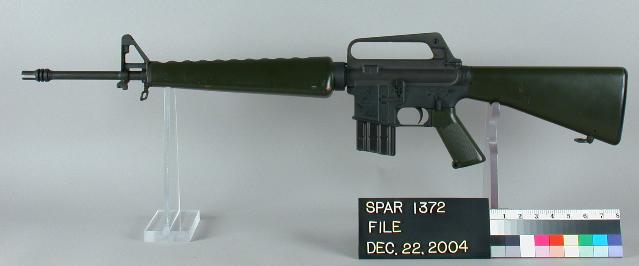
Colt ArmaLite AR-15 Model 01 with 20-round magazine, made from 1959 to 1964

Colt ArmaLite AR-15 Model 02 without magazine and new 1 in 12-inch (300 mm) rifling twist rate, made in 1964

== Design details ==
The ArmaLite AR-15 internal piston action was derived from the original ArmaLite AR-10 action and was later used in the M16 rifle action. This internal piston action system designed by Eugene Stoner is commonly called a direct impingement system, but it does not utilize a conventional direct impingement system. In U.S. patent 2,951,424, the designer states:

This invention is a true expanding gas system instead of the conventional impinging gas system.

The gas system, bolt carrier, and bolt-locking design were patented at for the time and is ammunition specific, since it does not have an adjustable gas port or valve to adjust the weapon to various propellant and projectile or barrel length specific pressure behavior.

The AR-15 is a modular weapon system. It is easy to assemble, modify and repair using a few simple hand tools, and a flat surface to work on. The AR-15's upper receiver incorporates the fore stock, the charging handle, the gas operating system, the barrel, the bolt and bolt carrier assembly. The lower receiver incorporates the magazine well, the pistol grip and the buttstock. The lower receiver also contains the trigger, disconnector, hammer and fire selector (collectively known as the fire control group). The AR-15's "duckbill" flash suppressor had three tines or prongs and was designed to preserve the shooter's night vision by disrupting the flash. Early AR-15's had a 25-round magazine. Later model AR-15s used a 20-round waffle-patterned magazine that was meant to be a lightweight, disposable item. As such, it is made of pressed/stamped aluminum and was not designed to be durable.

The AR-15's most distinctive ergonomic feature is the carrying handle and rear sight assembly on top of the receiver. This is a by-product of the design, where the carry handle serves to protect the charging handle. The AR-15 rifle has a 500 mm (19.75 inches) sight radius. The AR-15 uses an L-type flip, aperture rear sight and it is adjustable with two settings, 0 to 300 meters and 300 to 400 meters. The front sight is a post adjustable for elevation. The rear sight can be adjusted for windage. The sights can be adjusted with a bullet tip or pointed tool.

The Stoner system provides a very symmetric design that allows straight line movement of the operating components. This allows recoil forces to drive straight to the rear. Instead of connecting or other mechanical parts driving the system, high pressure gas performs this function, reducing the weight of moving parts and the rifle as a whole.

— Armalite Technical Note 54: Direct Impingement Versus Piston Drive

The AR-15's straight-line recoil design, where the recoil spring is located in the stock directly behind the action, and serves the dual function of operating spring and recoil buffer. The stock being in line with the bore also reduces muzzle rise, especially during automatic fire. Because recoil does not significantly shift the point of aim, faster follow-up shots are possible and user fatigue is reduced.

== See also ==
- List of ArmaLite rifles
- List of AR platform cartridges
