= ArmaLite AR-100 =

- Type: Assault rifle Carbine; Light machine gun
- Place of origin: United States

Production history
- Variants: AR-101 assault rifle AR-102 carbine AR-103 carbine AR-104 light machine gun

Specifications
- Cartridge: 5.56×45mm NATO
- Caliber: 5.56 mm (0.22 in)
- Action: Gas-operated, rotating bolt
- Rate of fire: 553-580rpm
- Feed system: 30 round detachable box magazine 100 round drum magazine

The ArmaLite AR-100 was an assault rifle based on the previous AR-16. The weapon was intended to increase firepower of a squad as well as mobility.

== Overview ==
The ArmaLite AR100 is a 5.56×45mm NATO caliber short-stroke piston gas-operated, 5.56×45mm NATO assault rifle fed from 30- round and 100-round drum magazines that eject from the magazine insert when empty and are discarded during a firefight. The AR-101 and AR-102 fire from closed bolt in semi-auto and open bolt in full auto whereas the AR-103 and AR-104 open bolt fire only.

== See also ==
- List of ArmaLite rifles
