= Car (disambiguation) =

A car is a motor vehicle with wheels.

Car, Cars, CAR or CARS may also refer to:

== Arts and entertainment ==
=== Film and television ===
- Cars (franchise), an animated film series
  - Cars (film), a 2006 animated film
- The Car (1977 film), an American horror film
- The Car (1997 film), a Malayalam film
- Car, one of the BBC Two 1991–2001 idents
- "The Car", an episode of The Amazing World of Gumball season 1
- "The Car", an episode of The Assistants
- "Car" (My Hero), a 2001 television episode
- "Car" (Not Going Out), a 2017 television episode

=== Literature ===
- Car (magazine), a British auto-enthusiast publication
- The Car (novel), by Gary Paulsen, 1993

=== Music ===
- The Cars, an American band
  - The Cars (album), 1978
- Peter Gabriel (1977 album), or Car
- Cars (soundtrack), the soundtrack to the 2006 film
- Cars (Now, Now Every Children album), 2009
- CARS, a 2011 album by Kris Delmhorst
- C.A.R. (album), by Serengeti, 2012
- The Car (album), by Arctic Monkeys, 2022
- "The Car" (song), by Jeff Carson, 1995
- "Cars" (song), by Gary Numan, 1979
- "Car", a song by Built to Spill from the 1994 album There's Nothing Wrong with Love

=== Other uses in arts and entertainment ===
- Cars (painting), a series of paintings by Andy Warhol
- The Car (Brack), a 1955 painting by John Brack
- Cars (video game), 2006, based on the film

== Businesses and organisations ==
- CAR Group, a global digital marketplace company
- Children of the American Revolution, a youth organization
- Conflict Armament Research, a British-based investigative organization
- Comité d'Action pour la Renouveau ('Action Committee for Renewal'), a political party of Togo
- Council for Aboriginal Reconciliation, in reconciliation in Australia
- Council for Aboriginal Rights (1951–1980s), in Australia
- Rugby Africa, formerly known as Confederation of African Rugby (CAR)
- World Skate Asia, formerly known as Confederation of Asia Roller Sports (CARS)

== Military ==
- Canadian Airborne Regiment, a Canadian Forces formation
- Colt Automatic Rifle, a firearm
- Combat Action Ribbon, a US military decoration
- U.S. Army Combat Arms Regimental System, a 1950s reorganisation of the regiments of the US Army

== People ==
- Car (surname), including a list of people with the name
- Cars (surname), including a list of people with the name

== Places ==
- Car, Azerbaijan
- Čar, Serbia
- Caribbean Community, UNDP country code
- Cars, Gironde, France
- Les Cars, Haute-Vienne, France
- Central African Republic (CAR)
- Cordillera Administrative Region (CAR), Philippines

== Science and technology ==
=== Astronomy ===
- Carina (constellation), abbreviation Car
- Theta Carinae, star in Carina

=== Computing ===
- C.a.R., geometry software
- Cache as RAM, a step of UEFI booting process
- CAR and CDR, commands in LISP computer programming
- Clock with Adaptive Replacement, a page replacement algorithm
- Computer-assisted reporting
- Computer-assisted reviewing

=== Biology and medicine ===
- Car (beetle), a genus of insects in the family Caridae
- CAR T cell, receptor proteins
- Childhood Autism Rating Scale (CARS), a behavior rating scale
- Conditioned avoidance response test, an animal test used to identify drug effects
- Constitutive androstane receptor, a protein
- Cortisol awakening response, on waking from sleep
- Coxsackievirus and adenovirus receptor, a protein

=== Other uses in science and technology ===
- Cable television relay service station (CARS), in telecommunications
- CCR and CAR algebras (canonical anticommutation relations), in quantum mechanics
- Central apparatus room, in broadcast facilities and television studios
- Coherent anti-Stokes Raman spectroscopy (CARS), a form of spectroscopy

== Transportation ==
- Railroad car, a vehicle on a rail transport network
- Tram, or streetcar, a type of railway that runs on streets
- Canada Atlantic Railway, 1879–1914
- Canadian Atlantic Railway, 1986–1994
- Canadian Aviation Regulations (CARs)
- Carlisle railway station, England, station code CAR
- Carrum railway station, Australia, station code CAR
- Car, the cab of an elevator

== Other uses ==
- Car (mythology), one or two figures in Greek mythology
- Car Allowance Rebate System (CARS), a vehicle scrappage program
- Car language, a language of the Nicobar Islands
- Carib language, ISO 639 language code car, a Cariban language of South America
- Caucasian Achievement and Recognition Scholarship, at Boston University
- Capital adequacy ratio, a measure of a bank's capital
- Club Always Ready, a Bolivian football club
- Cost accrual ratio, in finance
- Cumulative abnormal return, in investing
- Criminal Appeal Reports, in England & Wales

== See also ==
- Carr (disambiguation)
- Le Car (disambiguation)
- ICAR (disambiguation)
