= Le Car =

Le Car may refer to:

- Renault Le Car, the name used to market the Renault 5 automobile in the United States
- Le Car, an electric car model from LeEco
- LeCar, French transport network in Southern France (formerly Cartreize).

== See also ==
- Morris–Lecar model, biological neuron model
- Le Supercar, an electric car model from LeEco
- Boris Lekar (1932–2010) Soviet artist
- Ləkər, Azerbaijan; a village
- Car (disambiguation)
- Le (disambiguation)
