= Colt Machine Gun =

Colt Machine Gun-1
- Type: Belt-fed machine gun
- Place of origin: United States

Production history
- Designer: Robert F. Roy; Henry J. Tatro; George F. Curtis
- Designed: 1965
- Manufacturer: Colt Manufacturing Company
- Produced: 1965-1967
- Variants: CMG-1; CMG-1A; CMG-2; CMG-3

Specifications
- Cartridge: 5.56×45mm NATO (CMG-1, CMG-1A, CMG-2); 7.62x51mm NATO (CMG-3)
- Action: Gas operated
- Feed system: Belt-fed, open bolt, direct impingement Variants also exist that use a gas piston

The Colt Machine Gun or CMG was an open bolt belt-fed machine gun that fires 5.56×45mm cartridges designed by Colt Manufacturing Company in 1965. Colt hastily developed the CMG-1 to complement the CAR-15, a Colt branding of the M16 rifle, so that Colt might offer both of them as an alternative to the Stoner 63 weapons system. It failed to achieve any sales, and was replaced by the Colt CMG-2, which also failed to achieve any sales. The CMG-3 was a 7.62×51mm NATO version that failed as well.

== Colt Machine Gun #1 (CMG-1) ==
Though marketed together with the CAR-15, the CMG-1 had few parts in common with it. One CMG-1 used direct impingement and shared the bolt, gas tube, and other operating parts of the M16. However, other CMG-1s used gas pistons. The CMG-1s also used the M16's pistol grip, front sight block, and flash hider. Similar to the Stoner 63, the CMG-1 could be fed from either side. The rate of fire was 650 rounds per minute. Only two or three CMG-1s were ever made. Colt made them with sheet-metal stamping.

Colt offered the CMG-1 in four different versions: bipod-mounted, tripod-mounted, vehicle-mounted, or fixed mount. The 11.5 lb (5.2 kg). bipod-mounted version was marketed as a light machine gun for use by assault troops. It was the only version with a buttstock. The 12.5 lb (5.7 kg). tripod-mounted version was considered a medium machine gun. The vehicle mounted version was a pintle-mounted machine gun for use by soldiers in land vehicles. The fixed mount version was fired by a solenoid allowing for remote operation so it could be mounted in a helicopter or other aircraft.

== Colt Machine Gun #2 (CMG-2) ==
In 1967, Colt replaced the CMG-1 with the CMG-2. The CMG-2 abandoned any commonality with the M16 and was only available as a bipod-mounted full-automatic-fire-only light machine gun with a vertical foregrip. The CMG-2 was gas-piston operated, but used a modified M16 bolt. The firing pin was double-sided, so it could be reversed if it was damaged or broken. The extractor was machined into the bolt and ejected spent rounds down through the vestigial magazine well. The fixed plastic stock was built into the back of the bolt-carrier group.

The CMG-2's barrel was detachable and had a folding handle, so an overheated barrel could be replaced in the field. The barrel had a 1:9 twist and was meant to fire an experimental 68-grain (4.4 g) bullet, designed for longer ranges than the then-standard 55-grain (3.6 g) M193 bullet. Unlike the M60 machine gun then in use in the Vietnam War, which had its bipod and gas cylinder as integral to the spare barrel, an M2 bipod was mounted over the gas plug set in the CMG-2's ventilated handguard and was locked into place by the spare barrel's gas block.

The most unusual feature was that it lacked the charging handle of the M16. The operator charged the CMG-2 by unlocking the pistol grip and then sliding it forward and back to chamber a round from the belt and cock the weapon. A flat rectangular piece of metal slid on the trigger group's rails behind the trigger mechanism to act as a dust cover and keep debris out of the weapon.

It was fed from a disintegrating metal belt using Stoner's proprietary S-63 BRW links. The S-63 BRW was a scaled-down 5.56mm NATO version of the M-60's M13 metal links for the 7.62mm NATO cartridge. Belted ammo was contained in a 150-round Stoner green or black plastic drum that mounted on the left-hand side of the weapon.

Colt submitted a buttstock-less short-barreled CMG-2 to the Navy SEALs. The Navy classified the CMG-2 as the EX 27 Mod 0 machine gun but they ultimately chose the Stoner 63 MK23 Mod 0 Commando instead. The CMG-2 never left the prototype phase and Colt ceased development in 1969.

== Colt Machine Gun #3 (CMG-3) ==
A version chambered in 7.62 mm was made in the early 1970s. Only a limited number were manufactured, estimated to be around 5, with 2 remaining in existence.

== See also ==
- List of machine guns
- CAR-15 Heavy Assault Rifle M1 (AKA: Colt Automatic Rifle)
- Colt IAR6940
- Ares Shrike
- M+G project
- Stoner LMG
- Rodman Laboratories XM235

== Bibliography ==
- Stevens, R. Blake; Edward C. Ezell (1994) [1987]. The Black Rifle: M16 Retrospective. Modern U.S. Military Small Arms (Second Enhanced ed.). Cobourg, Canada: Collector Grade Publications Inc. ISBN 0-88935-115-5.
- Shea, Dan (June 1998). "SAR Identification Guide: The Colt Models (Part V)". Small Arms Review. 1 (9): 54–60. ISSN 1094-995X.
- Dockery, Kevin (2003). Weapons of the Navy SEALs. New York: Berkeley. pp. 317–319. ISBN 0-425-19834-0.
