= ICAR =

ICAR may refer to:

- I Car or HR 4102, a star in the constellation Carina
- i Car or HD 79447, a star in the constellation Carina
- ι Car or Iota Carinae (HD 80404), a star in the constellation Carina
- Indian Council of Agricultural Research
- Information Centre about Asylum and Refugees
- International Corporate Accountability Roundtable
- Circuit ICAR, a motorsports complex
- iCar (magazine), a British car magazine
- The Mitsubishi i car
- Apple "iCar", nickname for the Apple car project
- iCar (marque), an electric car brand by Chery
- Clemson University International Center for Automotive Research (CU-ICAR)
- Icar Air, a charter airline based in Bosnia
- Întreprinderea de Construcții Aeronautice Românești (ICAR), a former Romanian aircraft manufacturer
- International Commission for Alpine Rescue
- Istituto Centrale per gli Archivi (Central Institute for Archives), an institution based in Rome, Italy

== See also ==
- Connected car, internet connected car
- intelligent car, a type of semi- or autonomous vehicles
