= Colt Automatic Rifle =

Full-automatic-only firearm

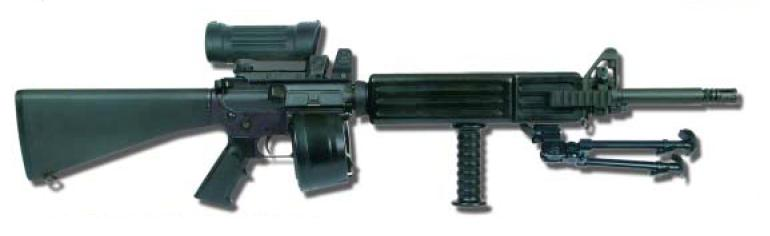
- Danish LSV (Light Support Weapon) M/04 with optical sight and 100-round Beta C-Mag.
- Type: Squad automatic weapon; Light machine gun
- Place of origin: United States

Service history
- In service: 1994-present
- Wars: War in Afghanistan (2001–2021); Iraq War; Operation Atalanta; Mali War; Military intervention against ISIL

Production history
- Designed: 1982
- Variants: See text

Specifications
- Mass: 5.78 kg (Unloaded)
- Length: 1,000 mm (39.4 in)
- Barrel length: 20 in (510 mm)
- Cartridge: 5.56×45mm NATO
- Action: Gas-operated, rotating bolt
- Rate of fire: 600–750 round/min
- Muzzle velocity: 991 m/s (3,251 ft/s; using the M193 round); 945 m/s (3,100 ft/s; using the M855 round)
- Effective firing range: 600 m
- Feed system: Various STANAG Magazines.
- Sights: Adjustable front and rear iron sight optical sights

The Colt Automatic Rifle or Colt Light Machine Gun is a 5.56 mm NATO, open-bolt, automatic squad automatic weapon developed by Colt Defense. It is based on the M16A2/A4, and has a distinctive squared-off handguard, vertical grip, carrying handle and integrated bipod.

It is one of many squad automatic weapon-type firearms that have been developed from the Armalite AR-15 that use the Stoner bolt and carrier piston system. The family name was derived from the original AR-15 by adding "Colt", resulting in the CAR-15, to stand for Colt Automatic Rifle, even though the "AR" in AR-15 stands for Armalite Rifle, the original manufacturer. The CAR-15 weapons system consisted of the AR-15 and five variations, including the Colt Machine Gun and CAR-15 Heavy Assault Rifle.

== Overview ==
The Colt Automatic Rifle is the name of a current product, but Colt has developed a number of similar weapons since the company obtained the rights to produce the Armalite AR-15 family at the end of the 1950s. Originally known as the Colt M16 LMG or simply as the Colt LMG (Light Machine Gun), this weapon was developed as a joint venture by Colt and Diemaco, a Canadian firm licensed by Colt in 1982 to produce variants of the M16 family for the Canadian Armed Forces. In 2005, Diemaco was acquired by Colt's Manufacturing LLC and renamed Colt Canada.

The Colt/Diemaco weapon traces its lineage to a number of weapons developed both at Colt and by the U.S. military. These weapons were all designed to fill the role of the earlier Browning Automatic Rifle. The BAR was originally to have been replaced by the M15 Squad Automatic Weapon, but instead was ultimately replaced by the M16A1; one rifleman was supposed to use this weapon's fully automatic setting while the rest of the squad used semi-automatic. Throughout the period between the introduction of the M16 and the introduction of the M249 as a purpose-built squad automatic weapon at the end of the SAW trials, interim weapons were developed and tested in order to fill the gap.

=== Colt Model 606 CAR-15 Heavy Assault Rifle M1 ===
Between 1964 and 1965, Colt began to expand the AR-15 beyond the realm of an infantry/assault rifle with the development of light machine gun weaponry. The result was the Model 606 series.

Colt made two of the model 606, called A and B models. The A model “featured forward assist devices found on the Colt 603 rifles.” The B model had a “four-position selector with burst fire as an option.” The M1 model, designed for sustained automatic fire, carried a heavy profile barrel. Colt developed a 30-round magazine for the weapon, and a bipod was designed for added stability.

The M2, designed with the same heavy barrel and bipod, also features a belt-fed drum mounted on top of the gun.

In February 1965, Colt submitted the Model 606A for the Small Arms Weapons Systems Trials (SAWS trials), sponsored by the U.S. Army, and would be known by the experimental classification as the GX–5856/Heavy Assault Rifle M1.

The 606 series was not successful as they were prone to rapid overheating, and the gas impingement system, together with the white nylon buffer, did not adapt effectively to sustained fire.

=== BRL XM106 ===
The U.S. Military followed the Small Arms Weapons Systems study with the Squad Automatic Weapon (SAW) program starting in the late 1970s. One of the four main concepts coming out of this program was the XM106, developed by the U.S. Army’s Ballistic Research Laboratory (BRL) in January 1978. The design, an open-bolt, magazine-fed adaption of the M16A1, was developed under the guidance of Timothy Brosseau.

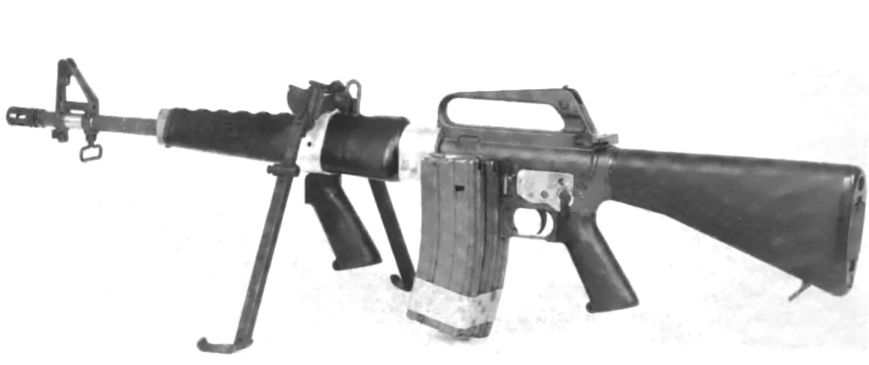
BRL XM106

The BRL gun differed primarily in having permanently fixed handguards and a special quick-change barrel system. The handguards also had an M2 bipod originally for the M14 rifle and a vertical foregrip fashioned from an M16A1 pistol grip. Early XM106s also had the front sight moved forward along the barrel to create a longer sight radius for more accurate long range fire, but this was dropped from later versions. In the end the Army used the XM106 as a control variable during the competition and instead selected the M249 Squad Automatic Weapon.

The Colt M16 HBAR was also included in the Squad Automatic Weapon (SAW) program, as requested by the U.S. Army’s Office of the Deputy Chief of Staff of Operations. The United States Marine Corps, in December 1977, had already invested funds for the development of a “sustained-fire capable version of the Colt M16 HBAR.”

=== Colt/Diemaco LMG ===
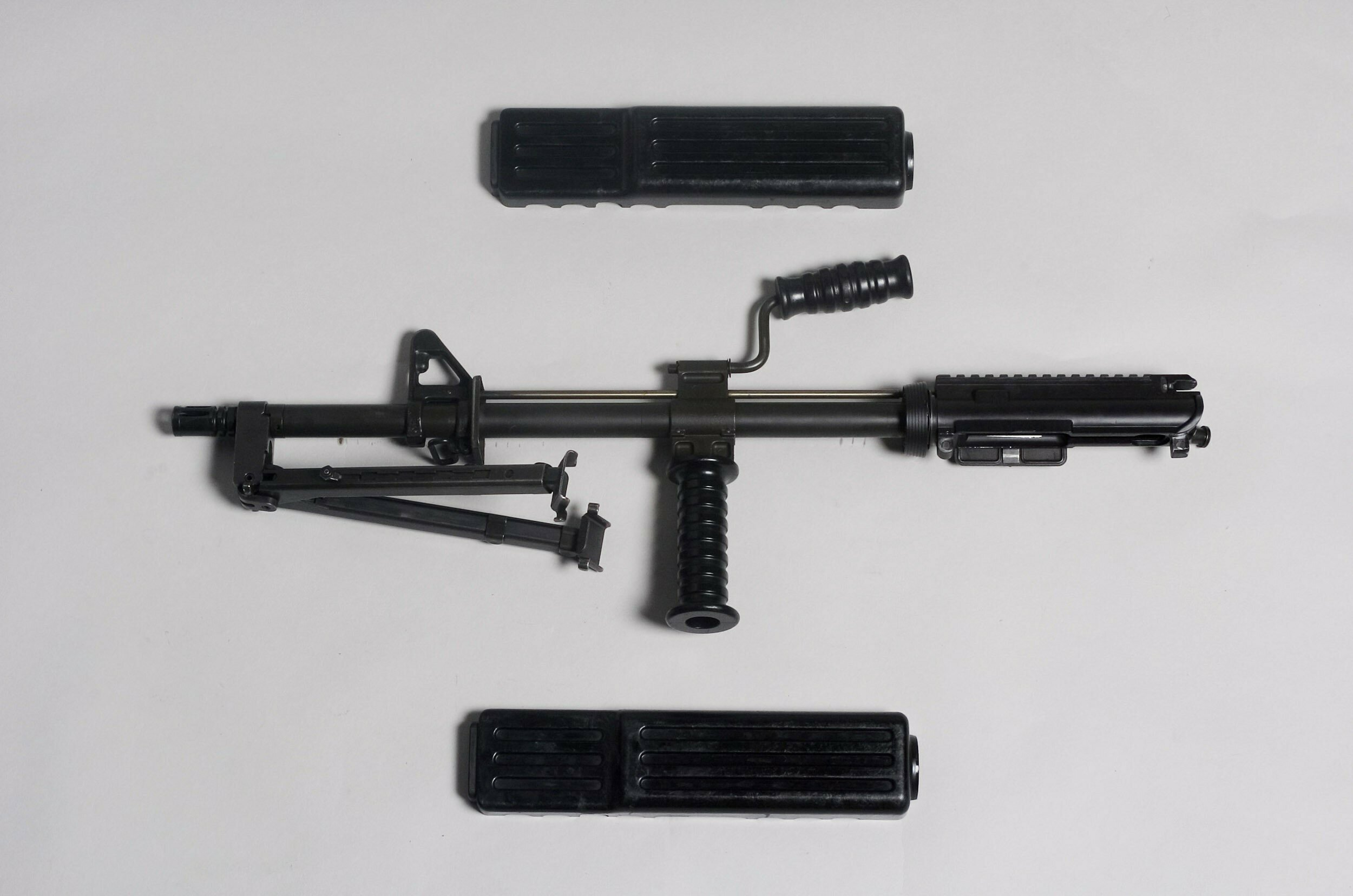
The heavy barrel profile and straight gas tube are seen with the handguards removed from the upper receiver of the C7 LSW

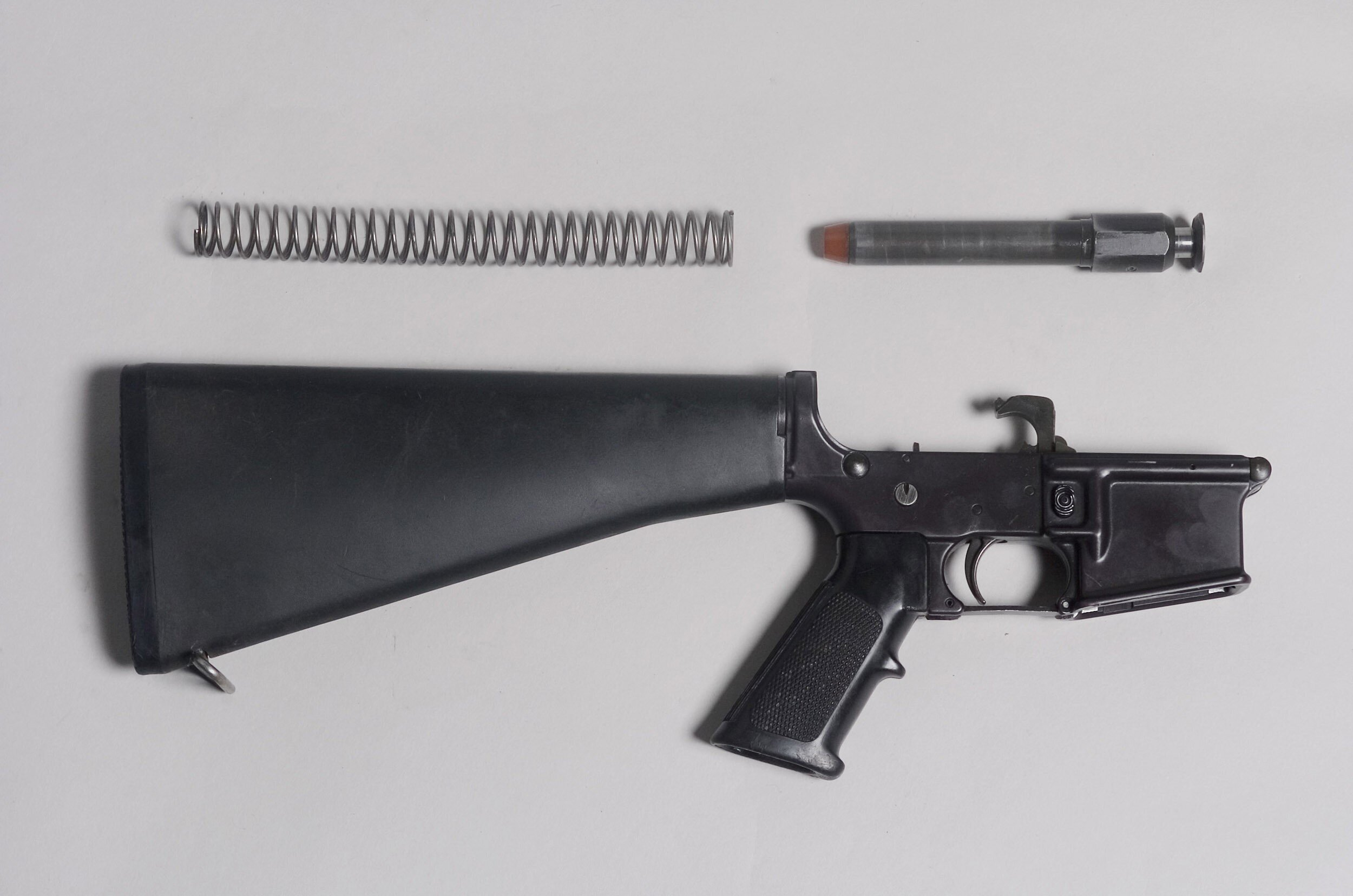
The return spring and hydraulic buffer assembly of the C7 LSW

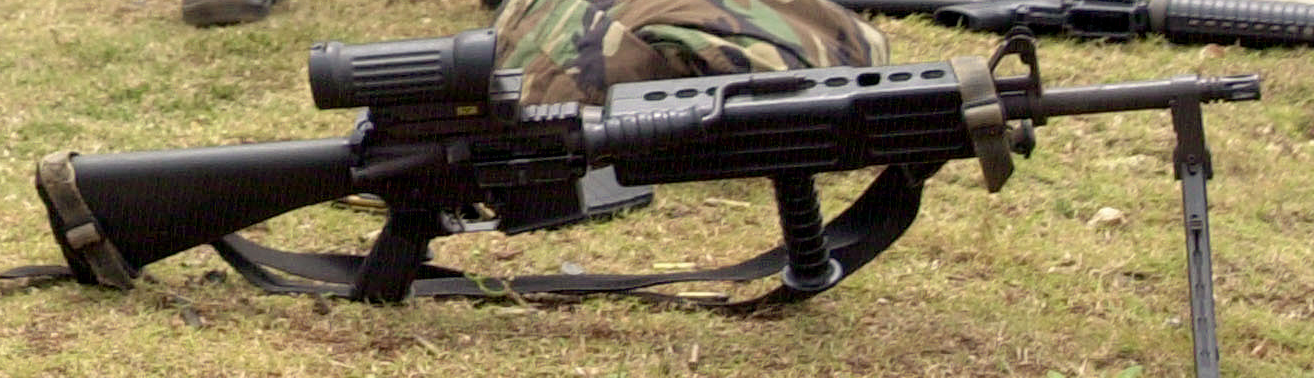
Diemaco Light Support Weapon (LOAW) in Dutch service, 2004

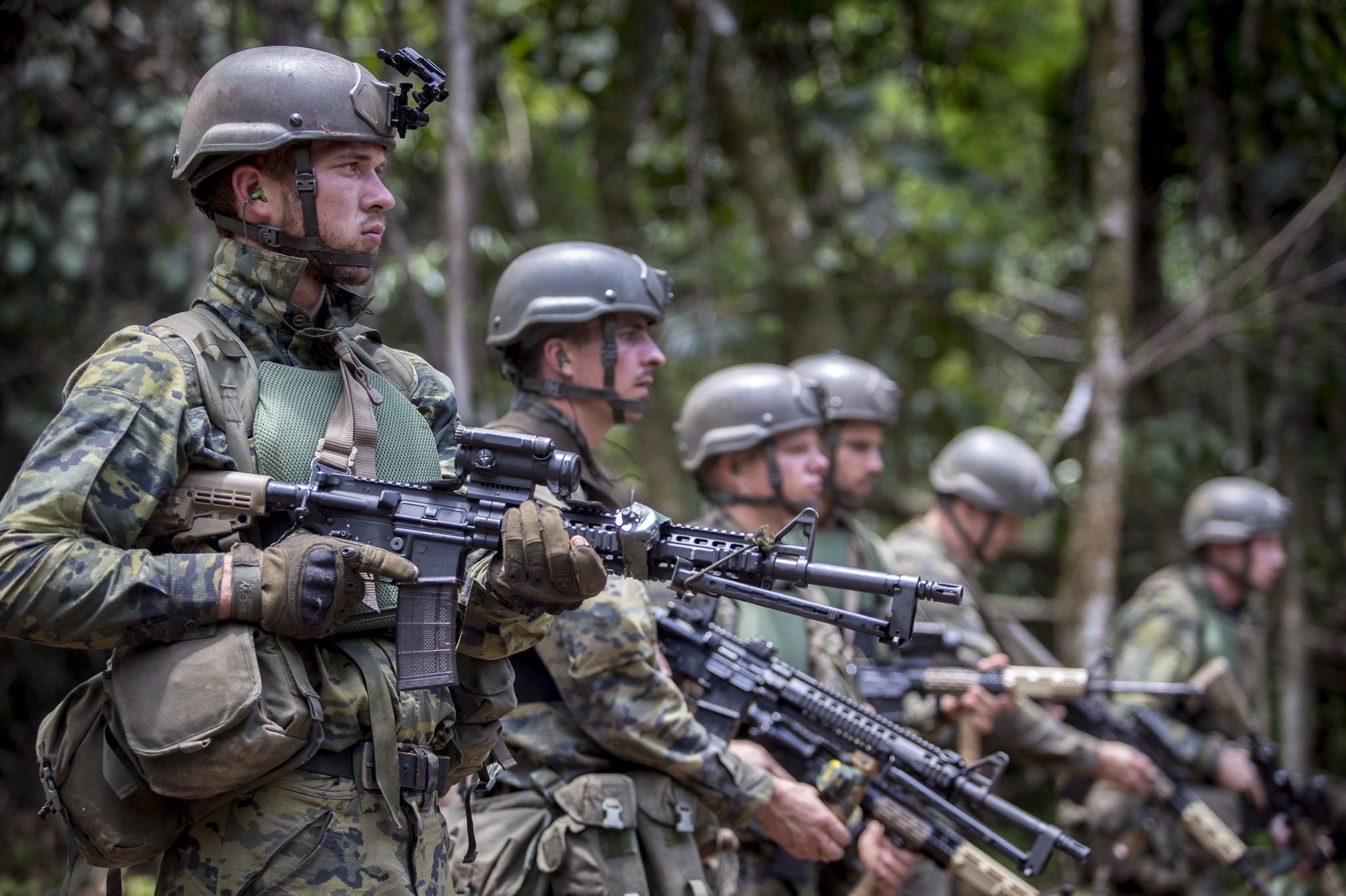
Upgraded Light Support Weapon (LOAWNLD) in Dutch service, 2020

During the 1980s Colt decided to expand on the basic ideas that had been developed in the WAK and BRL guns. The weapon was essentially a modified M16A1 with a new square handguard to cover the enlarged straight gas tube and almost 1 inch thick heavy barrel to make the barrel less susceptible for overheating and hence increase the sustained or effective rate of fire capability, a carry handle on top of the handguard, with a hydraulic buffer assembly and the ability to fire from an open bolt. The chrome-lined barrel was permanently fixed to the receiver and could not be replaced in the field. An angled foregrip was added to the handguard to improve handling as an automatic rifle. Rear sights later featured on the M16A2 were also introduced, and the weapon could only fire in fully automatic firing mode. Unlike many M16 variants, it fired from an open bolt, necessitating the removal of the forward assist for operating safety. Colt initially packaged these weapons with the MWG 90-round "snail drum" (later replaced with the Beta Systems C-Mag). Colt had also originally used the M60 machine gun bipod, but switched this to a proprietary design that was lighter for the subsequent Model 750.

The Colt Model 750 was an improvement of the basic principle of the Colt LMG, developed jointly by Colt and Diemaco with an eye to Canadian Army sales. The improved version featured all A2 parts and is essentially the same as the preceding variant externally except for the redesigned vertical foregrip, now of a ribbed straight cylindrical style. This weapon was marketed by Diemaco as the C7 Light Support Weapon (LSW) or simply as the LSW. The Netherlands Marine Corps designate it as "LOAW" (licht ondersteunend automatisch wapen/light supporting automatic weapon) and the Danish military as "LSV M/04". The LSWs used by the Netherlands Marine Corps and the Danish military like many M16 variants fire from a closed bolt and feature semi-automatic and fully automatic firing modes and a forward assist. With its 5.42 kg (14.5 lbs) the C7 LSW is relatively light and as it uses 5.56×45mm NATO ammunition fed from STANAG magazines, like assault rifles and carbines that are fed in the same way, ammunition is easy to redistribute between riflemen if the operator runs out of ammunition. The lack of belt feed and quick barrel change options limits the C7 LSW and similar magazine fed light support weapon's rapid rates of fire.

Colt and Diemaco further improved on the design, adding a flat top carry handle and a further improved bipod to the weapon in the 1990s. Colt refers to it as the Model 950, but markets it as the Colt Automatic Rifle, and until their purchase by Colt, as the Diemaco LSW. Because of the Colt-Diemaco partnership on this system, it was the only weapon in the Diemaco product line to feature M16A2-type range and windage adjustable rear sights, and when modified a detachable carry handle with M16A2 fully adjustable rear sights (the majority of Diemaco's product line had modified M16A1-type rear sights, and they actually developed a detachable carry handle with modified A1 rear sights). A maple leaf is stamped on the lower receiver of current Colt Automatic Rifles.

From 2009 onwards many of the Dutch LOAW purchased in 1994 have had an overhaul: the black furniture has now been replaced by dark earth furniture. New parts include a new retracting stock, ambidextrous controls, an Integrated Upper Receiver (IUR) with a free-floating barrel and RIS rails for mounting Laser Light Modules and other accessories. The ELCAN 3.4×28 optical sight has also disappeared in favour of the Swedish made Aimpoint CompM4 red dot sight and, if desired, an accompanying Aimpoint magnifier. The polymer STANAG compliant magazines became not exclusively black in color as translucent smoke colored Lancer L5AWM 30-round magazines (NSN: 1005-01-657-7839L5) were also introduced along the black Thermold magazines. This upgraded version is now known as "LOAWNLD".

== Users ==
- Brazil: RO750 used by Federal Police.
- Brunei: Replaced by Ultimax 100.
- Denmark: C7 Light Support Weapon designated as LSV M/04.

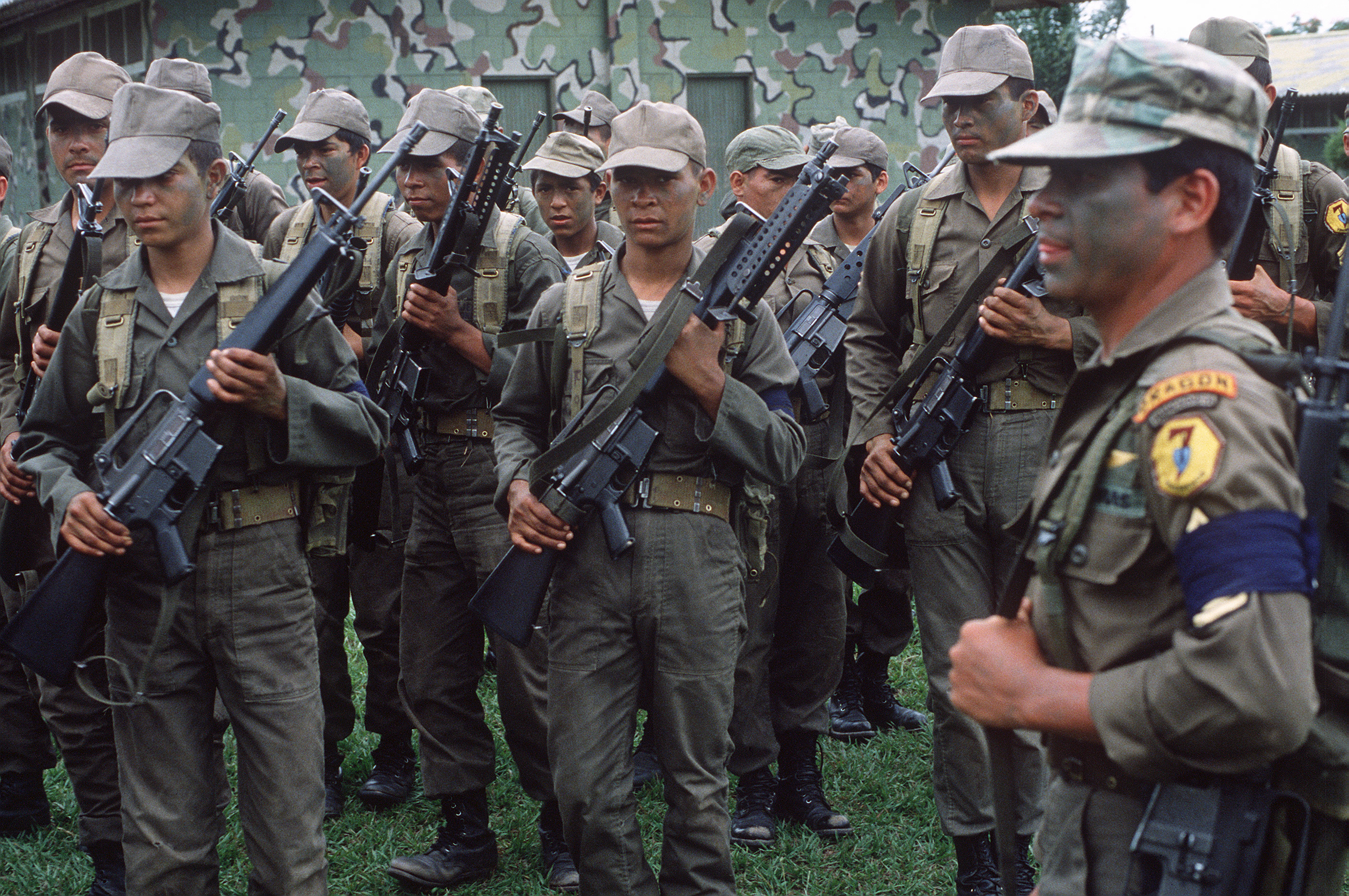
Honduran soldiers equipped with Colt Model 611s.

- Honduras: Colt Model 611.
- Mexico: M16A2 Light Machine Gun (LMG) variant operated by the Mexican marine infantry of the Mexican Navy (Armada de México).
- El Salvador: M16A2 Light Machine Gun (LMG) variant operated by the Salvadoran Army and also used by the Salvadoran Army in the Salvadoran Civil War from 1980 to 1992.
- Netherlands: C7 Light Support Weapon designated as LOAW(NLD) — Used by the Netherlands Marine Corps and Royal Netherlands Army.
- Panama: Colt Model 611.

== See also ==
- Colt AR-15 – (United States)
- CAR-15 Heavy Assault Rifle M2 (AKA: Colt Machine Gun) – (United States)
- Colt IAR6940 – (United States)
- Ares Shrike 5.56 – (United States)
- M27 IAR – (Germany)
- M+G project – (Netherlands)
- RPK – (Soviet Union)
- Squad automatic weapon
- Comparison of the AK-47 and M16
