= Light machine gun =

Machine gun for an individual soldier

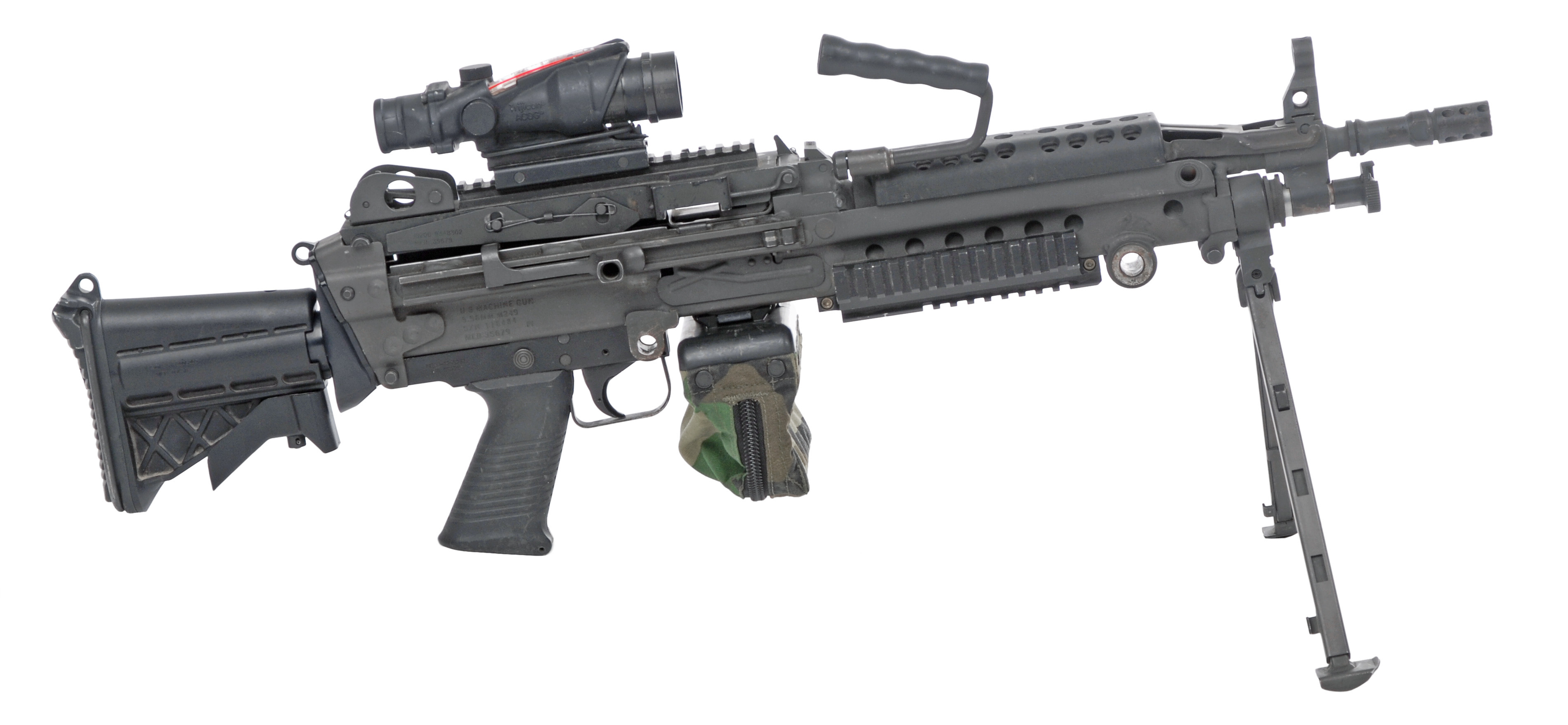
The Belgian Minimi M249 light machine gun, one of the most widespread modern 5.56 mm light machine guns amongst NATO countries. This one is an M249E3 "Para" model.

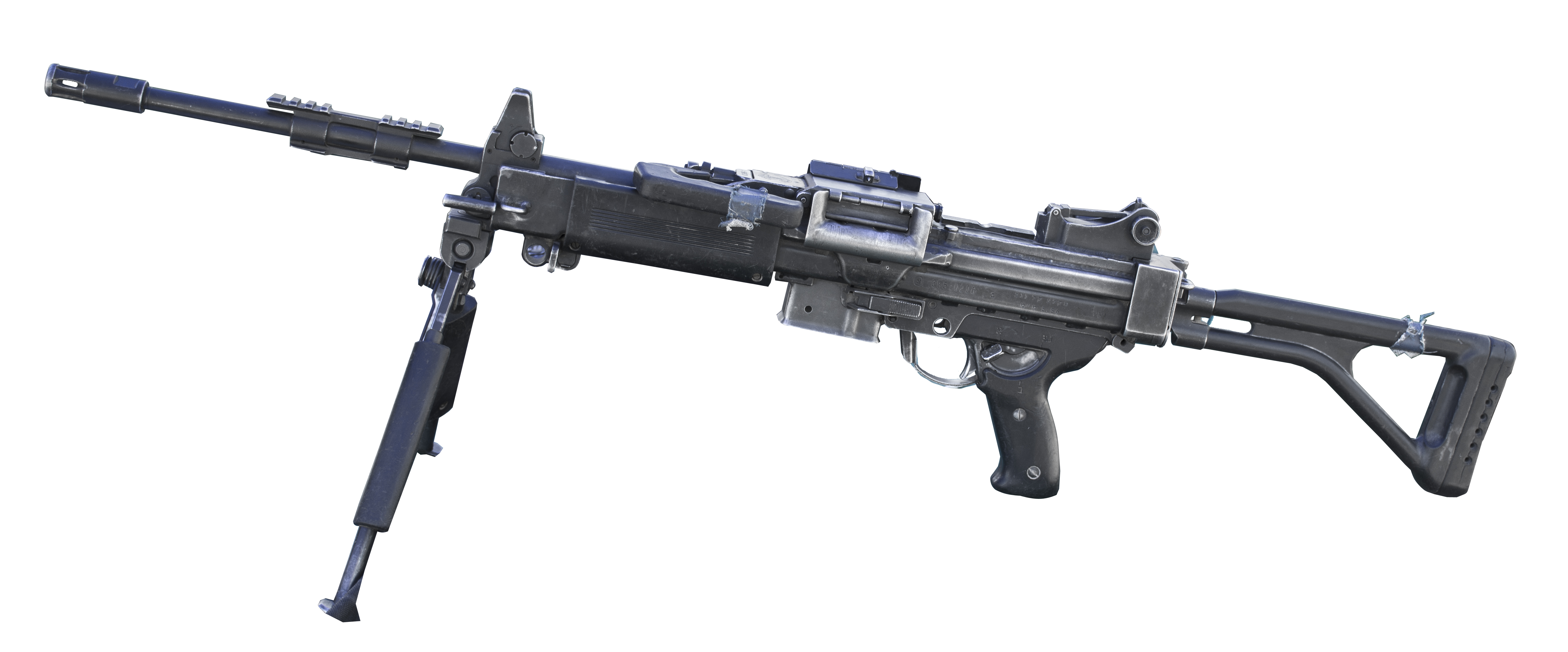
IWI Negev of the Israeli Army

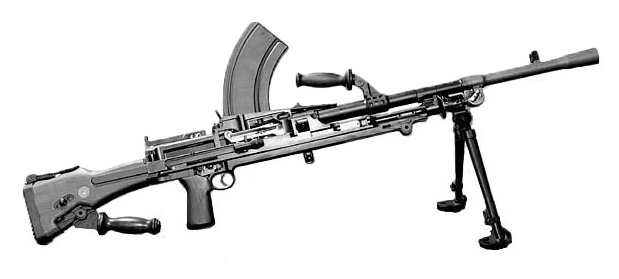
Bren light machine gun

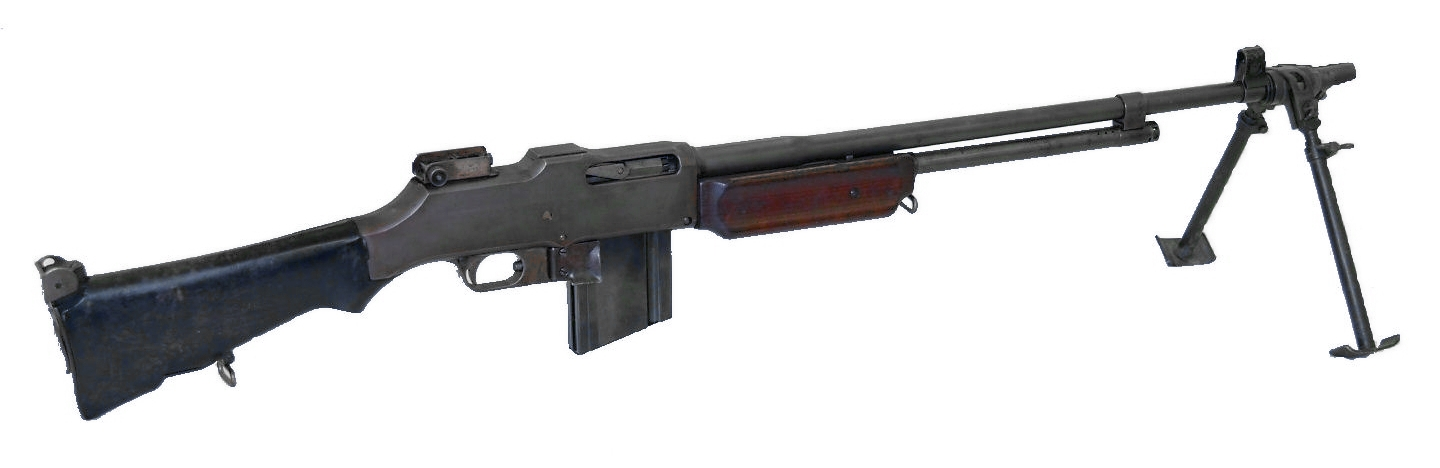
.30-06 Browning Automatic Rifle Model 1918

A light machine gun (LMG) is a light-weight machine gun designed to be operated by a single infantryman, with or without an assistant, as an infantry support weapon. LMGs firing cartridges of the same caliber as the other riflemen of the same combat unit are often referred to as squad automatic weapons. Unlike submachine guns, LMGs do not use pistol cartridges.

== Characteristics ==
While early light machine guns fired full-powered rifle cartridges, modern light machine guns often fire smaller-caliber rifle cartridges than medium machine guns – generally the same intermediate cartridge fired by a service's standard assault rifle – and are usually lighter and more compact. Some LMGs, such as the Russian RPK, are modifications of existing designs and designed to share the same ammunition. Adaptations to the original rifle generally include a larger magazine, a heavier barrel to resist overheating, a more robust mechanism to support sustained fire and a bipod.

A light machine gun is also defined by its usage as well as its specifications: some machine guns – notably general-purpose machine guns – may be deployed either as a light machine gun or a medium machine gun. Deployed on a tripod and used for sustained fire, it is a medium machine gun; if deployed with a bipod with the operator in a prone position and firing short bursts, it is a light machine gun.

Light machine guns are also designed to be fired from the hip or on the move as a form of suppressive fire intended to pin down the enemy. Marching fire is a specific tactic that relies on this capability.

Lighter modern LMGs have enabled them to be issued down at the fireteam level, with two or three at the section/squad level.

=== Ammunition feed ===
Many light machine guns (such as the Bren gun or the M1918 Browning Automatic Rifle) were magazine-fed. Others, such as the Hotchkiss M1922, could be fed either from a belt/strip or from a box magazine. Modern light machine guns are designed to fire smaller caliber rounds and, as such, tend to be belt-fed (from a container attached to the gun) or from a detachable drum magazine, but some, such as the FN Minimi, will also accept standard rifle magazine feeding as an auxiliary measure when belted ammunition has been exhausted.

== History ==
In 1903, French military theorists noticed that the heavy machine guns of the day were of little use in infantry assaults. They determined that "the machine gun must learn to walk". They researched the possibility of a light machine gun which could be carried by troops. A marching fire tactic was theorised, using incidental suppressive fire, with the advancing troops considered a deadlier threat than the un-aimed bullets, causing the enemy to fall back. The prototype guns were not approved for production, and none were in service when World War I began. The French quickly brought the prototypes to mass production to boost the firepower of advancing infantry.

By the end of World War II, light machine guns were usually being issued on a scale of one per fire team or squad, and the modern infantry squad had emerged with tactics that were built around the use of the LMG to provide suppressive fire.

== Selected examples ==
The following were either exclusively light machine guns, had a light machine gun variant or were employed in the light machine gun role with certain adaptations.

Model	Country of origin	Design date	Caliber(s)	Weight (base model) kg (lb)	Feed system	Rate of fire (rounds/min)	Model variants
Madsen machine gun	Denmark	1896	Various	9.07 (20.0)	Box magazine	450	M1902, Rexer, M1916, M1922, M1924, M1949
Chauchat (Fusil-Mitrailleur Mle 1915 'CSRG')	France	1907	8mm Lebel.30-06 Springfield	9.07 (20.0)	Magazine	240/360	M1918 CSRG Chauchat(USA)
Hotchkiss M1909 Benét–Mercié	United States; United Kingdom	1909	8mm Lebel.303 British.30-06 Springfield	12 (26.5)	Stripper clip fed	400–600	
Bergmann MG15 nA Gun	Germany	1910	7.92×57mm Mauser	12.9 (28.4)	Belt fed	500–600	
Vickers-Berthier	France; United Kingdom	1910	.303 British	11.07 (24.4)	Box magazine	450–600	
Lewis Gun	United States; United Kingdom	1911	.303 British.30-06 Springfield; 7.92×57mm Mauser	13 (28.7)	Pan magazine	600 (cyclic)	
Huot automatic rifle	Canada	1916	.303 British	5.9 (13.0)	Drum magazine	155/475	
M1918 Browning Automatic Rifle	United States	1917	.30-06 Springfield; 6.5×55mm 7.92×57mm Mauser	8.8 (19.4)	Box magazine	650 (cyclic)	Wz. 1928 (Poland)
Hotchkiss M1922	France	1922	Various	8.5 kg (18.7 lb)	Magazine	450	
Type 11 light machine gun	Japan	1922	6.5×50mm Arisaka	10.2 (22.5)	Stripper clip fed, hopper magazine	500 (cyclic)	
ZB vz. 26	Czechoslovakia	1923	7.92×57mm Mauser	10.5 (23.1)	Box magazine	500	
FM-24/29	France	1924	7.5×54mm French	9.1 (20.1)	Box magazine	450 (cyclic)	
Maxim-Tokarev	Soviet Union	1924	7.62×54mmR	12.9 (28.4)	Belt fed		
Lmg 25	Switzerland	1925	7.5×55mm Swiss	8.65 (19.1)	Box magazine	≈500	
Lahti-Saloranta M/26	Finland	1925	7.62×53mmR	9.3 (20.5)	Magazine	450–550	
Degtyaryov machine gun	Soviet Union	1927	7.62×54mmR	9.12 (20.1)	Pan magazine	550	
Mendoza RM2	Mexico	1928	7×57mm Mauser.30-06 Springfield	6.3 (13.9)	Box magazine	450–650	
Breda 30	Italy	1930	6.5×52mm Mannlicher–Carcano	10.6 (23.4)	Stripper clip fed, internal magazine	500 (cyclic)	
ZB vz. 30	Czechoslovakia	1930	7.92×57mm	9.1 (20.1)	Box magazine	550–650	
Bren	United Kingdom	1935	.303 British	10.35 (22.8)	Box magazine	500–520	
Type 96 light machine gun	Japan	1936	6.5×50mm Arisaka	9 (19.8)	Box magazine	450 (cyclic)	
Type 99 light machine gun	Japan	1939	7.7×58mm Arisaka	10.4 (22.9)	Box magazine	800	
RPK	Soviet Union	1960	7.62×39mm	4.8 kg (10.6 lb)	Drum or box magazine	600	RPK-74 RPK-16
Heckler & Koch HK21	West Germany	1961	5.56×45mm NATO; 7.62×51mm NATO	8.15 (18.0)	Belt fed or box magazine	900	HK11E; HK13E
Stoner 63	United States	1960s	5.56×45mm NATO	5.3 (11.7)	Drum or box magazine	1000 (cyclic)	
Colt Automatic Rifle	United States	1970s	5.56×45mm NATO	5.78 (12.7)	Drum or box magazine	750 (cyclic)	Diemaco LSW (CAN)
L86 LSW	United Kingdom	1970s	5.56×45mm NATO	6.58 (14.5)	Box magazine	775 (cyclic)	
FN Minimi	Belgium	1974	5.56×45mm NATO (standard); 7.62×51mm NATO	6.85 (15.1)	Belt fed or box magazine	1150 (cyclic)	M249 Squad Automatic Weapon (USA); MK 46 machine gun (USA)
CETME Ameli	Spain	1974	5.56×45mm NATO	5.3 (11.7)	Belt fed	1200 (cyclic)	MG82 (Spain)
Ultimax 100	Singapore	1977	5.56×45mm NATO	4.75 (10.5)	Drum or box magazine	600 (cyclic)	
Steyr AUG H-BAR	Austria	1977	5.56×45mm NATO	3.9 (8.6)	Box magazine	750 (cyclic)	
IWI Negev	Israel	1985	5.56×45mm NATO	7.4 (16.3)	Belt fed or magazine	1150 (cyclic)	
Negev NG7	Israel	2012	7.62×51mm NATO	7.9 (17.4)	Belt fed or magazine		
Heckler & Koch MG4	Germany	1990s	5.56×45mm NATO	8.55 (18.8)	Belt fed	885 (cyclic)	
Heckler & Koch MG36	Germany	1990s	5.56×45mm NATO	3.83 (8.4)	Drum or box magazine	750 (cyclic)	
INSAS LMG	India	1990s	5.56×45mm NATO	6.7 (14.8)	Box magazine	650 (cyclic)	
SAR-21 LMG	Singapore	1996	5.56×45mm NATO	3.82 (8.4)	Box magazine	650 (cyclic)	
Ares Shrike 5.56	United States	2000s	5.56×45mm NATO	3.4 (7.5)	Belt fed or magazine	800 (cyclic)	
Type-81 LMG	China	1981	7.62×39mm	5.15 (11.4)	75-round drum or 30-round STANAG	750 (cyclic)	BD-15 LMG (Bangladesh)
M27 IAR	Germany	2008	5.56×45mm NATO	3.6 (7.9)	Drum or box magazine	640 (cyclic)	
QJB-95	China	1997	5.8x42mm	3.25 (7.2)	60	900 (cyclic)	
Colt IAR6940	United States	2008	5.56×45mm NATO	4.32 (9.5)	Drum or box magazine	700 (cyclic)	Colt 6940E-SG (Singapore)
RPD	Soviet Union	1944	7.62×39mm	7.5 (16.5)	Belt fed	650	

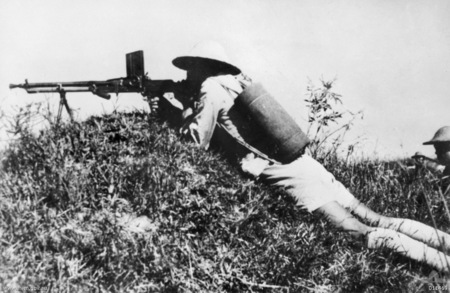
A Chinese soldier with a ZB vz.26 light machine gun.

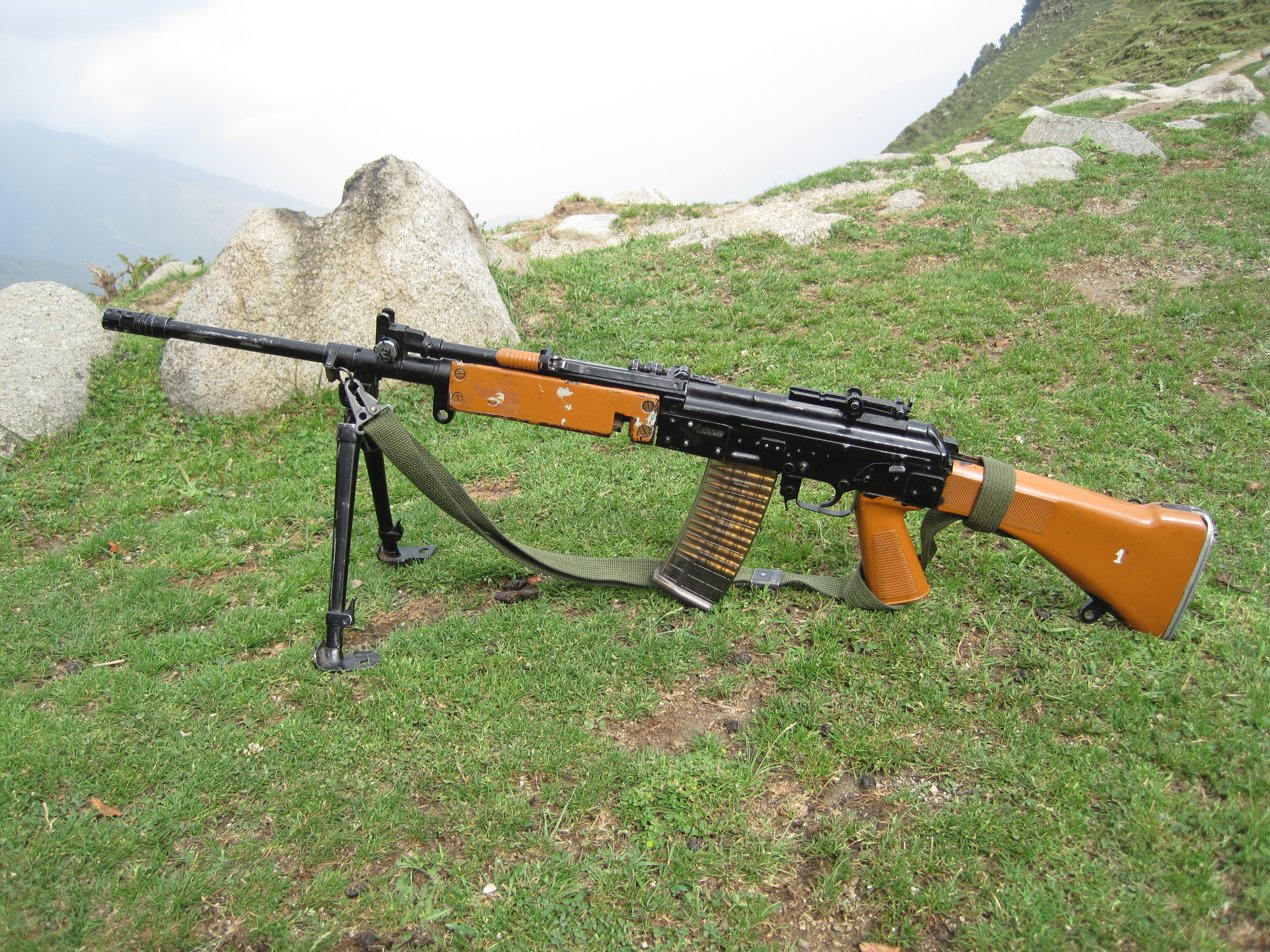
The early INSAS LMG, a weapon of Indian origin.

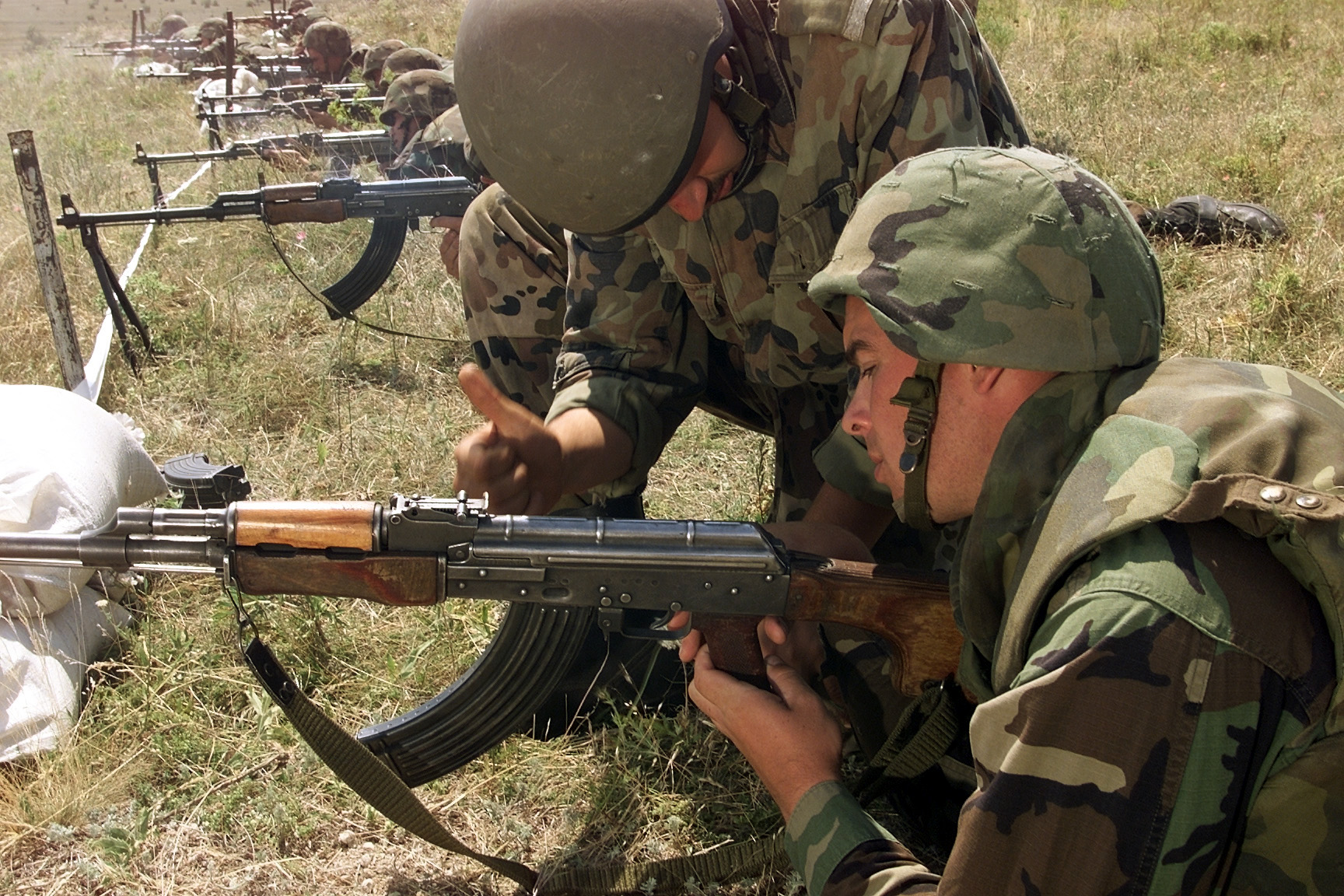
A Romanian soldier instructing a U.S. Marine in clearing an RPK

== See also ==
- Medium machine gun
- Heavy machine gun
- Automatic rifle
- Squad automatic weapon
- General-purpose machine gun
- Assault rifle
- List of machine guns
