= Bürsülüm =

- Municipality
- Location within Azerbaijan
- Coordinates: 38°39′52″N 48°38′54″E
- Country: Azerbaijan
- Rayon: Lerik

Population
  - Total: 426
- Time zone: UTC+4 (AZT)
  - Summer (DST): UTC+5 (AZT)

Bürsülüm (also, Barsalym, Bürsümlü, and Byursyulyum) is a village and municipality in the Lerik Rayon of Azerbaijan. It has a population of 426. The municipality consists of the villages of Bürsülüm and Ləkər.
