= Boris Lekar =

Soviet-Israeli multidisciplinary artist

- בוריס לקר
- Born: 28 October 1932; Kharkiv, Ukraine
- Died: 30 October 2010 (aged 78); Jerusalem, Israel
- Known for: Painting, architecture, sculpture
- Awards: Ish-Shalom Prize, Mordechai Narkis Prize, Israel's Ministry of Immigrant Absorption Prize
- Website: borislekar.com

Boris Lekar (Hebrew: בוריס לקר, Russian: Борис Лекарь; 28 October 1932 – 30 October 2010) was a multidisciplinary artist, considered by critics as one of the exceptional artists of the Soviet emigration to Israel.

== Biography ==
=== Biographical details ===
Boris Lekar was born in the year 1932 in Kharkiv, Ukraine. He immigrated to Israel at the age of 58 in 1990 and although he traveled profusely and worked worldwide Jerusalem remained his home. In Israel he became a focal point for immigrant artists – creating, exhibiting and teaching. In addition to his own exhibitions he hosted exhibitions in his home for tens of young artists and influenced the art of many of them. He died in October 2010.

== Awards ==
- Ish-Shalom Prize for Lifetime Achievement in Art (In the name of Mordechai Ish-Shalom).
- Israel's Ministry of Immigrant Absorption Prize
- Award for Research in Jewish Art (In the name of Mordechai Narkis).

== Selected solo exhibitions ==
- 1993 Jerusalem Theater, Jerusalem, Israel.
- 1994 Ein Harod Museum, Ein Harod, Israel.
- 1997 The International Convention Center Gallery, Jerusalem, Israel.
- 1997 Artist's House, Jerusalem, Israel.
- 1997 Beit Gabriel Museum, Israel.
- 1998 Tova Osman Gallery, Tel Aviv, Israel.
- 1998 Efrat Gallery, Tel Aviv, Israel.
- 1998 Prozdor Gallery, Tel Aviv, Israel.
- 1998 Uri and Rami Museum, Israel.
- 2001 Tadzio Gallery, Kiev, Ukraine.
- 2003 Knesset, Jerusalem, Israel.
- 2004 Cité internationale des arts, Paris, France.
- 2005 "Different Light", Artist's House, Jerusalem, Israel.
- 2007 "Transitions", Agripas 12 Gallery, Jerusalem, Israel.
- 2008 "In the Light of Other Language", Agripas 12 Gallery, Jerusalem, Israel.
- 2009 “Israel Landscapes”, Dudu Gerstein's Gallery, Tel Aviv, Israel.
- 2011 Memorial Exhibition, Agripas 12 Gallery, Jerusalem, Israel.

== Selected group exhibitions ==
- 1995 “New art of Israel” and “Art expo”, New York City.
- 1996 “landscapes – before and now”, The State Museum of Cyprus, Nicosia.
- 1999 "100 Years of the Israeli watercolors", Israel Museum, Jerusalem, Israel.
- 2002 "Object", Artist's House, Jerusalem, Israel.
- 2004 "Biennale of Graphic Arts", Artist's House, Jerusalem, Israel.
- 2005 "Paris" Gallery, Paris, France.
- 2005 "Light", Israel Museum, Jerusalem, Israel.
- 2006 “Vita Nova”, New Gallery, Jerusalem, Israel.
- 2007 “Summer in Agripas”, Agripas 12 Gallery, Jerusalem, Israel.
- 2007 “From the Tunnel Road to Uppsala”, Agripas 12 Gallery, Jerusalem, Israel.
- 2008 “Surface Fractures”, Artists House, Jerusalem, Israel.
- 2008 “Agripas Gallery In Tel Aviv”, Dudu Gerstein's Gallery, Tel Aviv, Israel.
- 2008 ” Israeli Symbols and Images”, Agripas 12 Gallery, Jerusalem, Israel.
