= Cost accrual ratio =

The Cost Accrual Ratio for a business is the total average cost per person per unit time, e.g. average cost per day per person. It is only useful for risk assessment in small projects where average wages are roughly equal.

== Context and limitations ==
The term "cost accrual ratio" is not widely recognised as a standard financial ratio in mainstream accounting or financial analysis literature. In most financial reporting contexts, accrual-based measures refer to the recognition of expenses when they are incurred rather than when cash is paid, consistent with accrual accounting principles.

Traditional financial ratio analysis more commonly includes liquidity ratios, profitability ratios, efficiency ratios, and leverage ratios. Measures related to accruals are typically discussed under earnings quality or accrual ratio analysis rather than as a "cost accrual ratio."
