= Icar Air =

Charter airline based in Bosnia

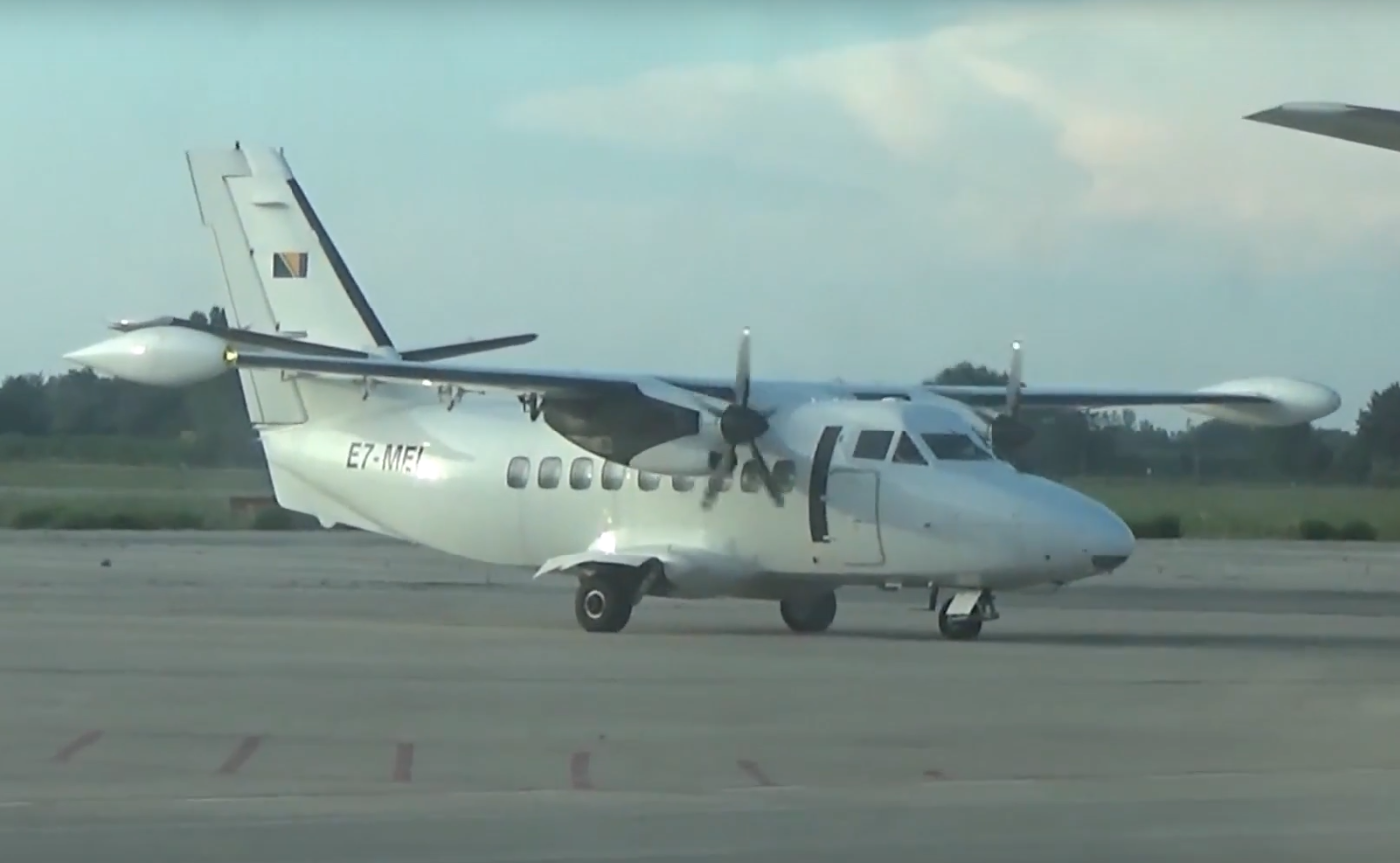
- Let L-410 Turbolet UVP-E
IATA	ICAO	Call sign
-	RAC	TUZLA AIR
- Founded: April 2000
- Fleet size: 2
- Headquarters: Tuzla, Bosnia and Herzegovina
- Key people: Osman Sarajlić

Icar Air is a privately owned passenger and cargo charter airline based in Tuzla, Bosnia and Herzegovina.

== History ==
The company was formed in 2000 and very soon started to operate a Boeing 737 leased from third party airline. It currently leases aircraft (ACMI), and operates ad hoc charter flights. The company holds a DHL Aviation contract for Bosnia and Herzegovina and operates a scheduled freight service between Sarajevo and Ancona, mainly with a Saab 340F.

== Fleet ==
The Icar Air fleet includes the following aircraft as of February 2023:

- 1 Saab 340
- 1 Let L-410 Turbolet UVP-E

The airline previously operated the following aircraft:

- 1 Boeing 737-300
- 1 Let L-410 Turbolet
