= Cable television relay service station =

Retransmission facility

In telecommunications, a cable television relay service station (CARS) is a fixed or mobile station used for the transmission of television and related audio signals, signals of standard and FM broadcast stations, signals of instructional television fixed stations, and cablecasting from the point of reception to a terminal point from which the signals are distributed to the public.
