= M27 Infantry Automatic Rifle =

American assault rifle

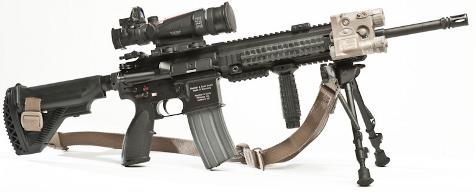
- M27 IAR with ACOG Squad Day Optic and AN/PEQ-16A weapon-mounted laser module with visible laser, infrared targeting laser, infrared illuminator, and white light
- Type: Assault rifle/Carbine; Squad automatic weapon Designated marksman rifle (M38 DMR)
- Place of origin: Germany/United States

Service history
- In service: 2010–present
- Used by: United States Marine Corps
- Wars: War in Afghanistan; Syrian Civil War: Operation Inherent Resolve

Production history
- Designer: Heckler & Koch
- Designed: 2008
- Manufacturer: Heckler & Koch
- Unit cost: US$1,300
- Produced: 2010–present
- No. built: 14,100

Specifications
- Mass: 7.9 lb (3.6 kg) empty 9.8 lb (4.4 kg) loaded weight with sling
- Length: 36.9 to 33 in (940 to 840 mm) with adjustable stock
- Barrel length: 16.5 in (419 mm); 11 in (279 mm) for RWK
- Width: 3.1 in (79 mm)
- Height: 9.4 in (240 mm)
- Cartridge: 5.56×45mm NATO
- Action: Gas-operated short-stroke piston, rotating bolt
- Rate of fire: Cyclic rate: 700–900 rounds/min; Sustained rate: 36 rounds/min
- Muzzle velocity: 2900 ft/s (884 m/s)
- Effective firing range: 550 m (600 yd) (point target); 700 m (770 yd) (area target)
- Maximum firing range: 3,938 yd (3,601 m)
- Feed system: 30-round STANAG magazine
- Sights: Typically Trijicon ACOG, flip-up rear rotary diopter sight and front post

The M27 Infantry Automatic Rifle (IAR) is a 5.56mm, select-fire assault rifle / squad automatic weapon developed from the HK416 by Heckler & Koch. It is used by the United States Marine Corps (USMC) and was originally intended for automatic riflemen, but is now issued to all infantry riflemen as a replacement for the M16A4 and the M4A1. The USMC initially planned to purchase 6,500 M27s to replace a portion of the M249 light machine guns employed by automatic riflemen within Infantry and Light Armored Reconnaissance Battalions. Approximately 8,000–10,000 M249s will remain in service with the Marine Corps to be used at the discretion of company commanders. In December 2017, the Marine Corps announced that it would equip every member of an infantry squad with the M27, supplanting the M4 carbine which would be retained at the platoon leadership positions and above. A further subvariant, the M38 DMR was created as a designated marksman rifle, retaining most features of the M27.

== Background ==
In 1999, a Universal Need Statement was issued for an IAR. Around 2000, the 1st Marine Division's 2nd Battalion, 7th Marines Regiment conducted initial, limited IAR trials which confirmed the desirability of a light automatic rifle. The key difference between a lighter infantry rifle and a more heavily built automatic rifle is the ability of the latter to maintain sustained continuous fire without stoppages, overheating, or loss of accuracy. Experiences in Iraq and Afghanistan resulted in formal requests for recommendations. The Universal Need Statement spent six years going through the procurement process before an official program was begun and a list of required capabilities was created in early 2005.

The Infantry Automatic Rifle program began on 14 July 2005, when the Marine Corps sent Requests For Information to arms manufacturers. Characteristics desired in the weapon included portability and maneuverability; similarity in appearance to other rifles in the squad, reducing the likelihood that the gunner will receive special attention from the enemy; facilitation of the gunner's participation in counterinsurgency operations; and capability of maintaining a high volume of fire. An initial requirement for a magazine with a minimum capacity of 100 rounds was dropped in favor of the 30-round STANAG magazine because, at the start of testing, available 100-round magazines were unreliable. Caliber was specified as 5.56×45mm with non-linked ammunition, so as to achieve commonality with existing service rifles.

=== Testing ===
In 2006, contracts were issued to several manufacturers for sample weapons. Fabrique Nationale d'Herstal submitted an IAR variant of the FN SCAR, Heckler & Koch (H&K) submitted an HK416 variant, and Colt Defense submitted two designs, one including the Colt IAR6940. Companies that attempted to compete but were not accepted as finalists for testing included the Land Warfare Resources Corporation M6A4 IAR, Patriot Ordnance Factory, and General Dynamics Armament and Technical Products with the CIS Ultimax 100 MK5 (marketed as the GDATP IAR).

In December 2009, the H&K weapon won the competition and entered into a five-month period of final testing. In the summer of 2010, it was formally designated as the M27 Infantry Automatic Rifle.

=== Fielding ===
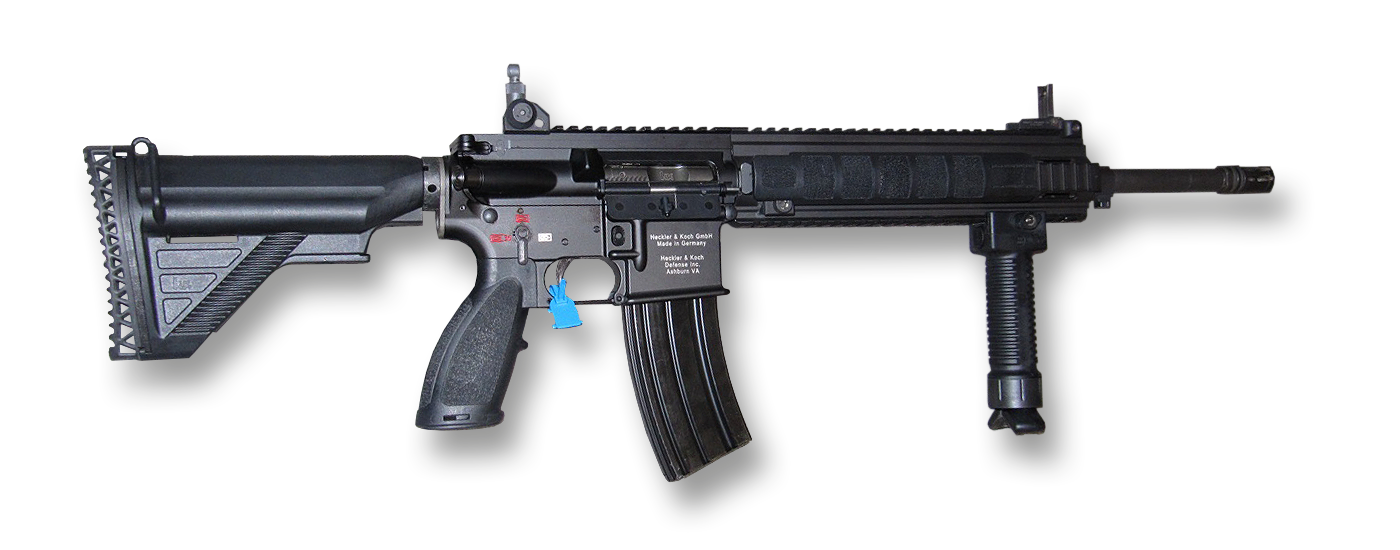
An M27 IAR displayed at the NDIA Joint Armaments Conference, May 2010

After the Marine Corps Operational Test and Evaluation Activity conducted further testing at Twentynine Palms, Fort McCoy and Camp Shelby for dust, cold-weather, and hot-weather conditions, respectively, limited fielding of 458 IARs were sent to four infantry battalions, one per each Marine expeditionary force, one reserve, and one light armored reconnaissance battalion, all of which deployed to Afghanistan in 2011.

In May 2011, Marine General James F. Amos approved the conclusion of the Limited User Evaluation (LUE) and ordered the replacement of the M249 LMG by the M27. Fielding of the approximately 6,500 M27 units was completed by 2013, at a cost of $13 million. Each M27 gunner was to be equipped with around 22 30-round magazines of the type currently in use with the M16 and M4 carbine, approximating the combat load of an M249 Squad Automatic Weapon gunner. The M27 gunner would not be expected to carry all 22 magazines. The individual combat load would be determined at the unit level and was expected to vary by unit, based on results of evaluations. Though program officials were aware that switching from the belt-fed M249 would result in a loss of suppressive fire capability, Charles Clark III, of the Marine Corps' Combat Development and Integration Office, cited the substantially increased accuracy of the M27 as a significant factor in the decision to replace the M249.

=== Replacement of M16/M4 ===
In early 2017, Commandant of the Marine Corps General Robert Neller said he wanted to equip every "0311" rifleman with an M27 IAR. Because of that, the Marine Corps issued a request in early 2017 for 11,000 M27 IARs from H&K. According to Chris Woodburn, deputy of the Maneuver Branch, Fires and Maneuver Integration at Marine Corps Combat Development Command, "The new order will replace all M4s in every infantry squad with an M27, except for the squad leader." He stated that the change includes infantry training battalions. The timeline for funding was planned for fiscal years 2019 and 2020, with the Corps acquiring some of the rifles in fiscal year 2018. As of August 2017, officials stated that "riflemen are the top priority", but that the M27 "will be in the hands of combat engineers and light armored reconnaissance battalion scouts next."

The Corps later issued a pre-solicitation notice for the M27. "The new pre-solicitation notice of 50,184 [M27s]", said Woodburn, "is [meant] to up the production capacity that H&K must be able to meet as the sole-source provider [of the M27], should the Marines decide to order more in the future." At SHOT Show 2018, the Marine Corps announced that the deal with H&K to produce 11,000 M27s for the Marine Corps had been finalized and that the M27 IAR would be adopted as the standard issue service rifle of the Marine Corps infantry, largely replacing the M4, which would be retained at platoon and company leadership levels. In 2019, it was reported that the last of the M27s would arrive at the Marine Corps inventory and are expected to be in the hands of each infantryman from platoon commander and below by mid-2021. Ultimately, the Marines bought just over 14,000 M27s, Manny Pacheco, spokesman for Marine Corps Systems Command, told Marine Corps Times. The Marine Corps more than doubled the contract with Heckler & Koch for the M27. The U.S. Department of Defense reported in a November 6, 2026 notice that the contract value for the M27 increased by $45.4 million, from $39.23 million to $84.6 million, which included new guns, parts and associated equipment.

=== Suppressive fire debate ===
While Marine Corps Systems Command was optimistic about operational testing, former Marine Commandant General James T. Conway remained skeptical, because of the reduction in firepower at the fireteam-level that would result if the M27 was adopted. He felt that, while more accurate, it was unlikely that the M27 could provide fire superiority over the belt-fed M249 SAW. A magazine-fed rifle, requiring frequent reloading, would not be able to sustain the same rate of fire. In a firefight, squad members carrying extra magazines for the M27 might not always be in a position to supply them to the gunner. Further, the SAW was already a battle-proven weapon. He regarded it as significant that the Army had chosen not to pursue the IAR concept.

The notion that the M27 represents a reduction in suppressive fire, has spawned considerable debate between proponents of the M249 SAW within the infantry and those who advocate that a lighter, more maneuverable, and accurate weapon is sufficient to support offensive operations at the squad level. With the M249 SAW, the doctrine of fire suppression is the sound of continuous fire with rounds landing close to the enemy. While the M249's volume of fire may be greater, it is less accurate. Experienced troops who have dealt with incoming fire, are less likely to take cover from incoming rounds if they are not close enough. With an IAR, the doctrine is that lower volume of fire is needed with better accuracy. Fewer rounds need to be used, and automatic riflemen can remain in combat longer and in more situations.

== Combat reviews ==
The IAR was initially fielded in December 2010. 1st Battalion, 3rd Marines were deployed to Afghanistan in April 2011 with 84 IARs. Former SAW gunners initially did not like the M27 but appreciated it as time went on. It weighed 9 lb (4 kg) loaded, compared to 22 lb (10 kg) for an M249, which was a significant difference when on five-hour missions. Gunners said it was "two weapons in one", being able to fire single shots accurately out to 800 meters (2,600 ft) and have fully automatic fire. It also blended in with standard M16-style service rifles, making it difficult for enemy forces to identify the machine gunner.

The battalion leadership saw the M27 IAR as better at preventing collateral damage, as it is more controllable on fully automatic than the M249. Concern of volume of fire loss was made up through training courses developed in December 2010. With the M249 SAW, the idea of suppression was volume of fire and the sound of the machine gun. With the M27 IAR, the idea of suppression shifts to engaging with precision fire, as it has rifle accuracy at long range and fully automatic fire at short range. Shooters transitioned from long-range precision fire at 700 meters to short-to-medium-range suppressive fire at 200 meters (660 ft), both while in the prone position. Some gunners in combat have been used as designated marksmen. An M27 gunner with one aimed shot has the effect of three or four automatic shots from the SAW and still has the option of a heavier volume with an accurate grouping.

Marines issued with the M27 enjoy its similarities to other M4-style weapons in service. Its gas-operated short-stroke piston action runs cooler and more cleanly, requires less maintenance, has less internal parts wear, and is less susceptible to malfunctions compared to previous direct impingement M4- and M16-style weapons. IAR gunners consider the rifle-grade accuracy to be a significant improvement over the SAW, despite the loss of sustained firing. Due to budget limitations, the Marine Corps is looking at ways to implement the IAR as a multipurpose weapon. Suggestions included use as an automatic rifle and as a designated marksman rifle, a role where it replaced the Squad Advanced Marksman Rifle. Additionally, the free-floating barrel offers improved accuracy at approximately 2 MOA compared with 4.5 MOA for M16A4 rifles.

== Design ==
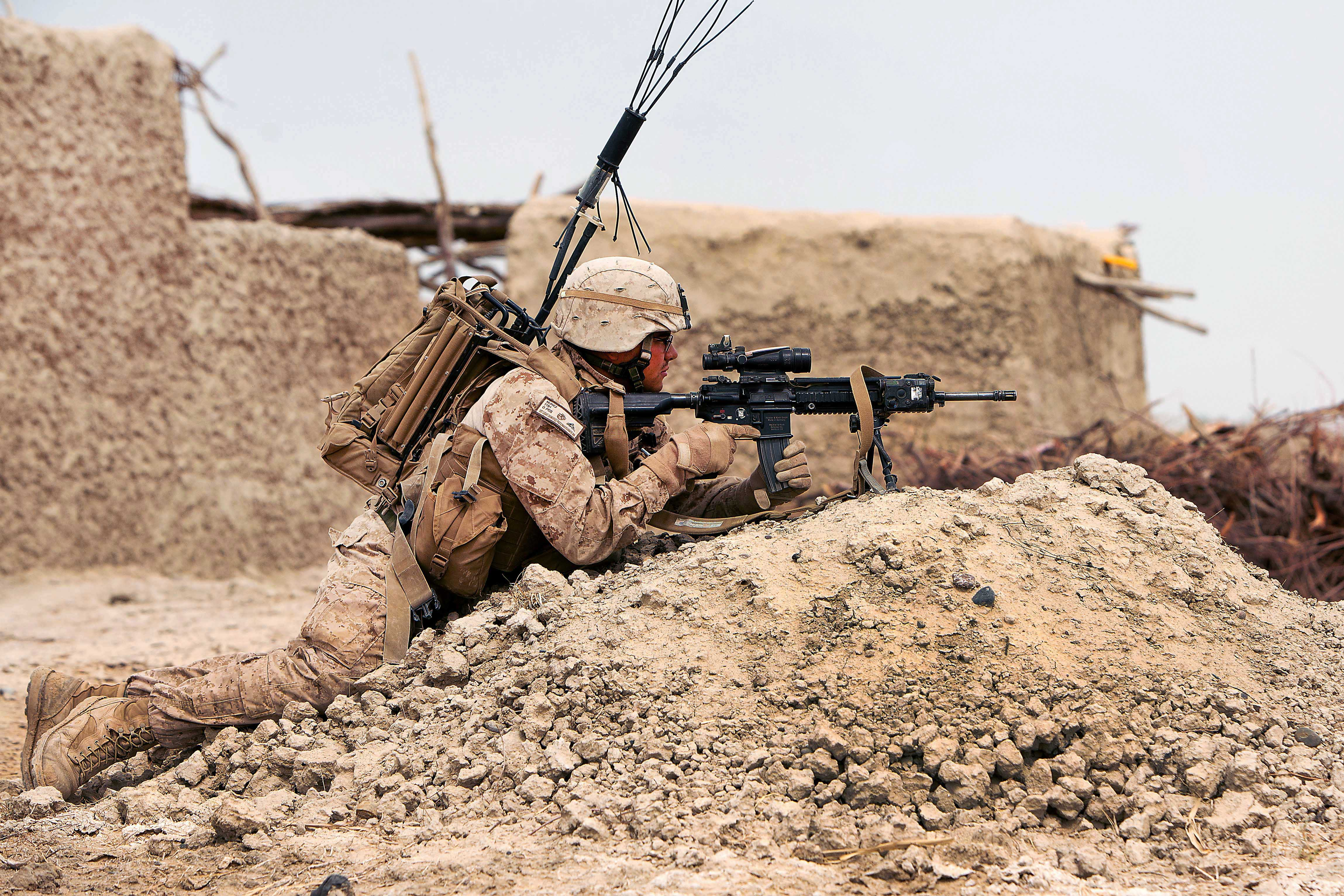
A US Marine armed with an M27 fitted with a Harris bipod and an ACOG Squad Day Optic covers his team in Afghanistan, March 2012.

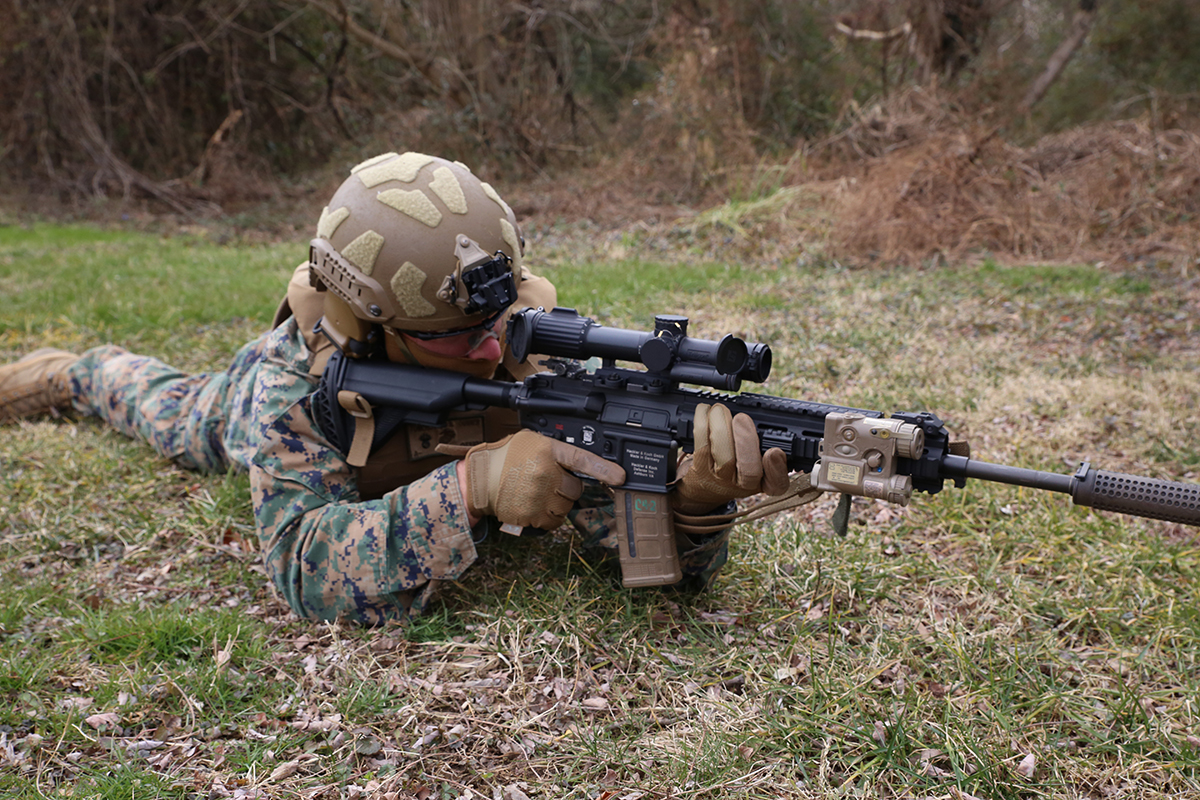
A US Marine with a 2021-standard M27 fitted with a VCOG Squad Common Optic and a KAC suppressor

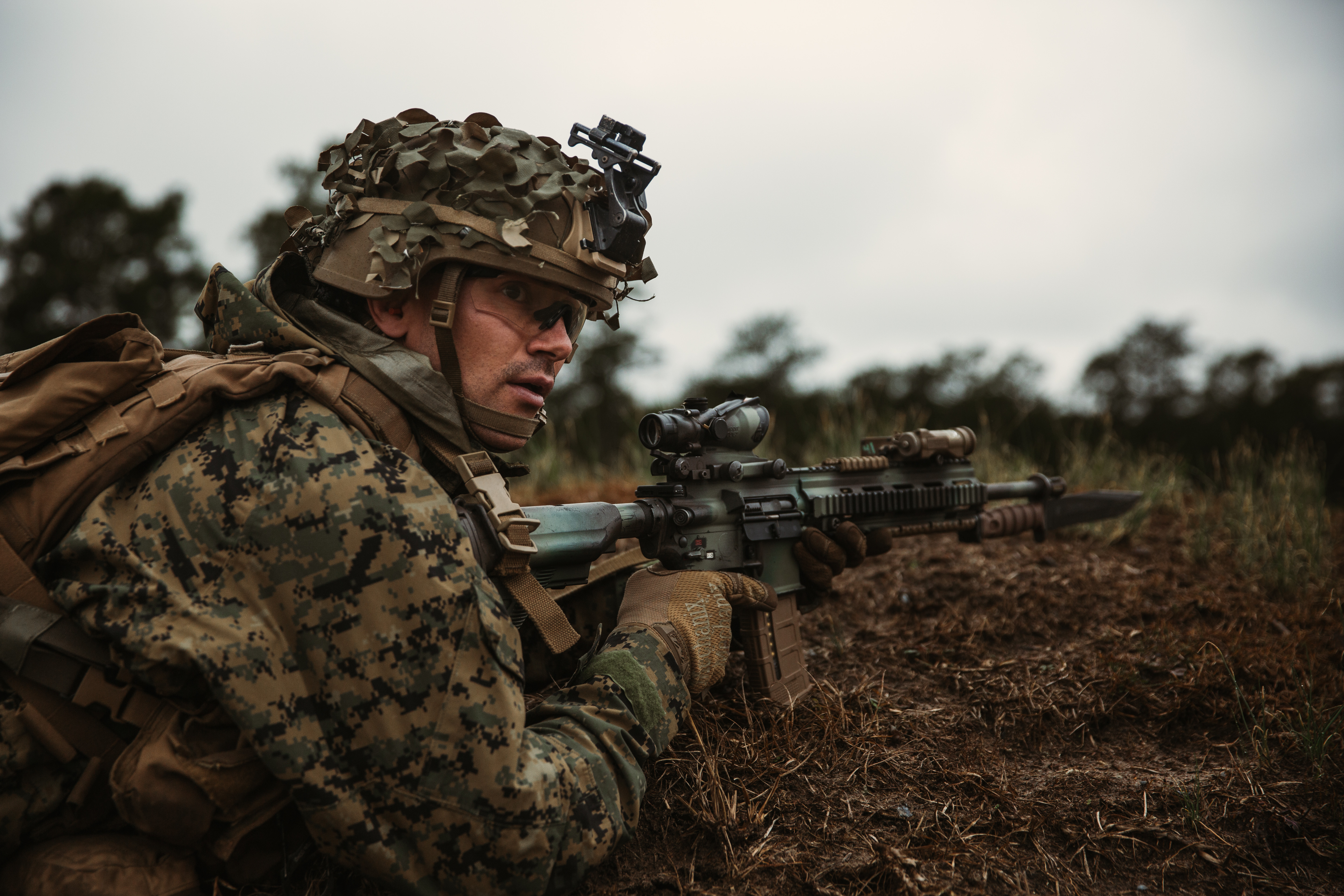
A US Marine with an M27 fitted with an ACOG Rifle Combat Optic and an OKC-3S bayonet

The M27 is an HK416 variant with accessories required by the Marine Corps. It features a gas-operated short-stroke piston action with a rotating bolt and a 16.5-inch (419 mm) cold hammer forged free-floating barrel. The handguard has four MIL-STD-1913 Picatinny rails for use with accessories and optics and has ambidextrous controls and charging handle, which the stock variant of the HK416 would only possess in their A5 and later variants. Alternate calibers other than 5.56 mm were considered for the M27, but eventually were not considered after the Marine Corps decided not to go through with procuring 6.8 SPC systems.

=== Magazine ===
The M27 IAR is fed from standard 30-round STANAG magazines. The improved STANAG magazine with the tan-colored anti-tilt follower is favored over the previous version with the green follower because it can be inserted more easily, and the anti-tilt follower can handle high rates of fully automatic fire with less chance of malfunction. There were issues with some STANAG magazines jamming inside the magwell, especially when painted or damaged. While a rifleman normally carries seven 30-round magazines, an IAR gunner carries up to 16 and may carry as many as 21 due to the requirements of the role and fully automatic rate of fire. The magazine well has a flared opening that aids in magazine insertion. PMAG 30 GEN M2 magazines are not compatible with the M27 as the frontal plastic bevel on the PMAG prevents it from being seated, similar to SA-80 and its parent rifle, HK416.

Due to M27's incompatibility for M2 PMAG magazines the Marines banned the polymer PMAG for issue to prevent interchangeability issues with the M4/M16 units. To rectify the incompatibiliy, Magpul developed the PMAG 30 GEN M3 magazine, which is compatible with both the M27 and M16-series rifles and is in the process of arranging verification and official testing. After Marine Corps testing of the M855A1 Enhanced Performance Round with the M27 showed reliability problems from feeding issues from standard magazines, leading to the introduction of the PMAG 30 GEN M3 Window, which had better reliability with the EPR, was approved for use by Marines in December 2016, so that M27 gunners who receive M855A1 rounds do not face such issues. Extended magazines of between 50 and 100 rounds were being explored to increase rifle capacity.

=== Accessories ===
Unlike the original HK416, the rifle does not utilize HK designed iron sights, instead using USMC approved accessories. It is issued with the Blue Force Gear Vickers Combat Applications sling and rail sling mounts, AIM Manta Rail Covers, Harris bipod, KAC backup iron sights, a foregrip, and bayonet lug. The M27 IAR initially was equipped with a grip-pod(a foregrip with integral bipod legs) but was replaced by a separate foregrip and bipod.

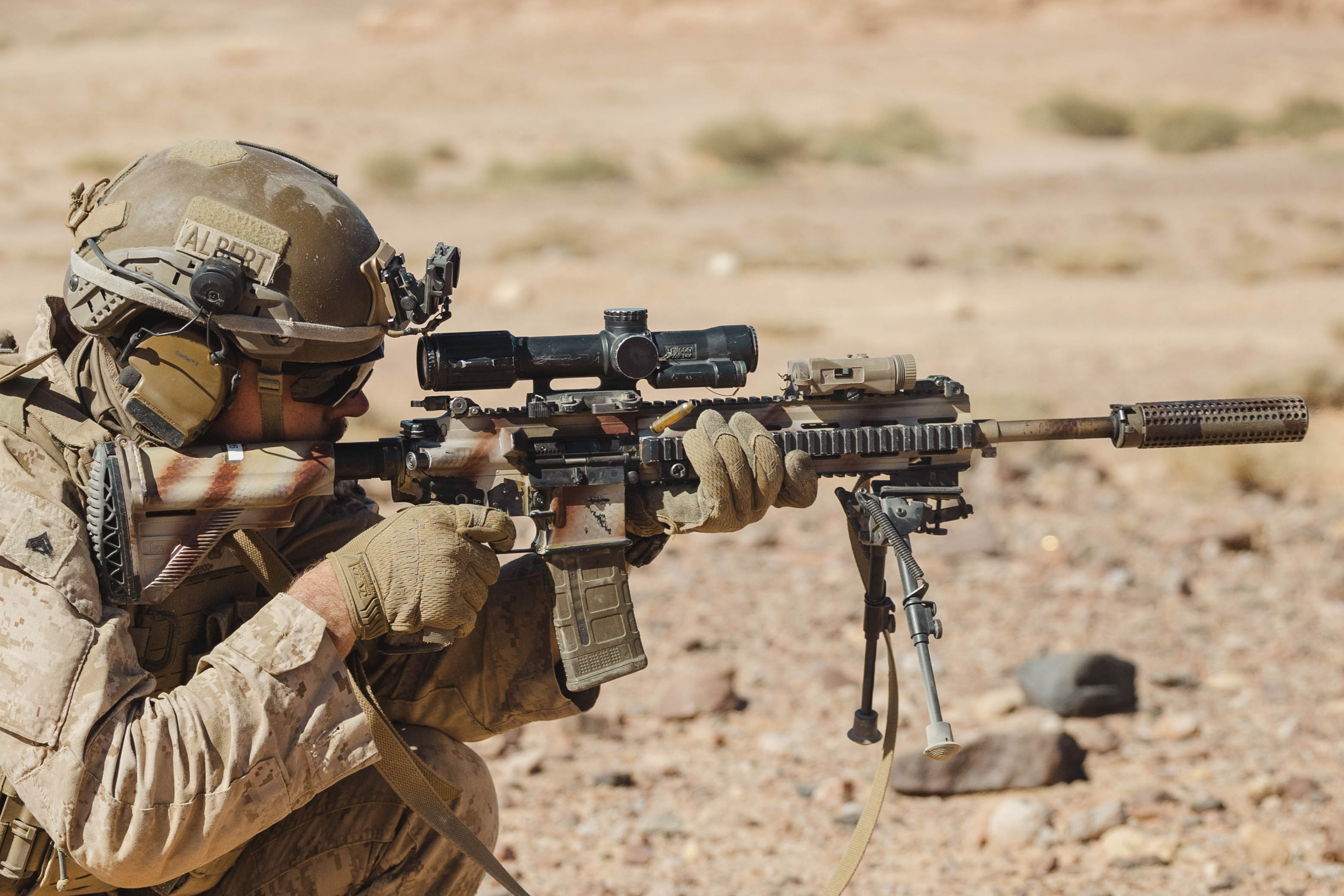
M27 with an SCO, KAC NT4 QDSS suppressor, AN/PEQ-16, and Harris bipod

The standard optic is the Trijicon Advanced Combat Optical Gunsight (ACOG) Squad Day Optic (SDO), officially designated the Sight Unit, SU-258/PVQ [TA11SDO]. It is a 3.5×35 machine gun optic that has a Ruggedized Miniature Reflex (RMR [RM05 RMR]) sight screwed on top for close-quarters engagements under 100 meters. Created for the SAW, the day optic offers slightly less magnification but longer eye relief than the ACOG Rifle Combat Optic (RCO) on M16s and M4s. The longer relief helps reduce injury risk from recoil.

In February 2020, it was announced that Trijicon would deliver approximately 19,000 units of its newer 1-8x28 Variable Combat Optical Gunsight (VCOG) between 2021 and 2023 under the SU-281/PVQ [VCOG 1x8-28] Squad Common Optic (SCO) designation. The SU-281/PVQ is a variable-power magnified day optic that comprises a noncaliber-specific reticle and an illuminated or nonilluminated aim-point and is intended to supplement the attrition and replacement of the older ACOG RCO and SDO sights for weapons including the M27. Fielding of the VCOG SCO began in January 2021. In December 2021, the USMC signaled intention to acquire 19,000 units of the SCO.

In January 2017, a USMC unit deployed with KAC NT4 QDSS suppressors mounted to their M27 rifles as part of a concept to suppress every weapon in an infantry battalion. Exercises showed that having all weapons suppressed improved squad communication and surprise during engagements. Disadvantages included additional heat and weight, increased maintenance, and the greater cost of equipping so many troops with the attachment. In July 2020, the Marine Corps announced it would be ordering suppressors for use by all M27s used by close combat units. The Marines began to roll out suppressors for all M27s in infantry, reconnaissance and special operations units in December 2020. The QDSS, in use since the 2000s, works on both M4/M16 rifles and M27/M38 rifles. It features a quick-detach mechanism. The USMC hopes to field 30,000 units before fiscal year 2023. As of December 2020, it has already obtained 13,700 units.

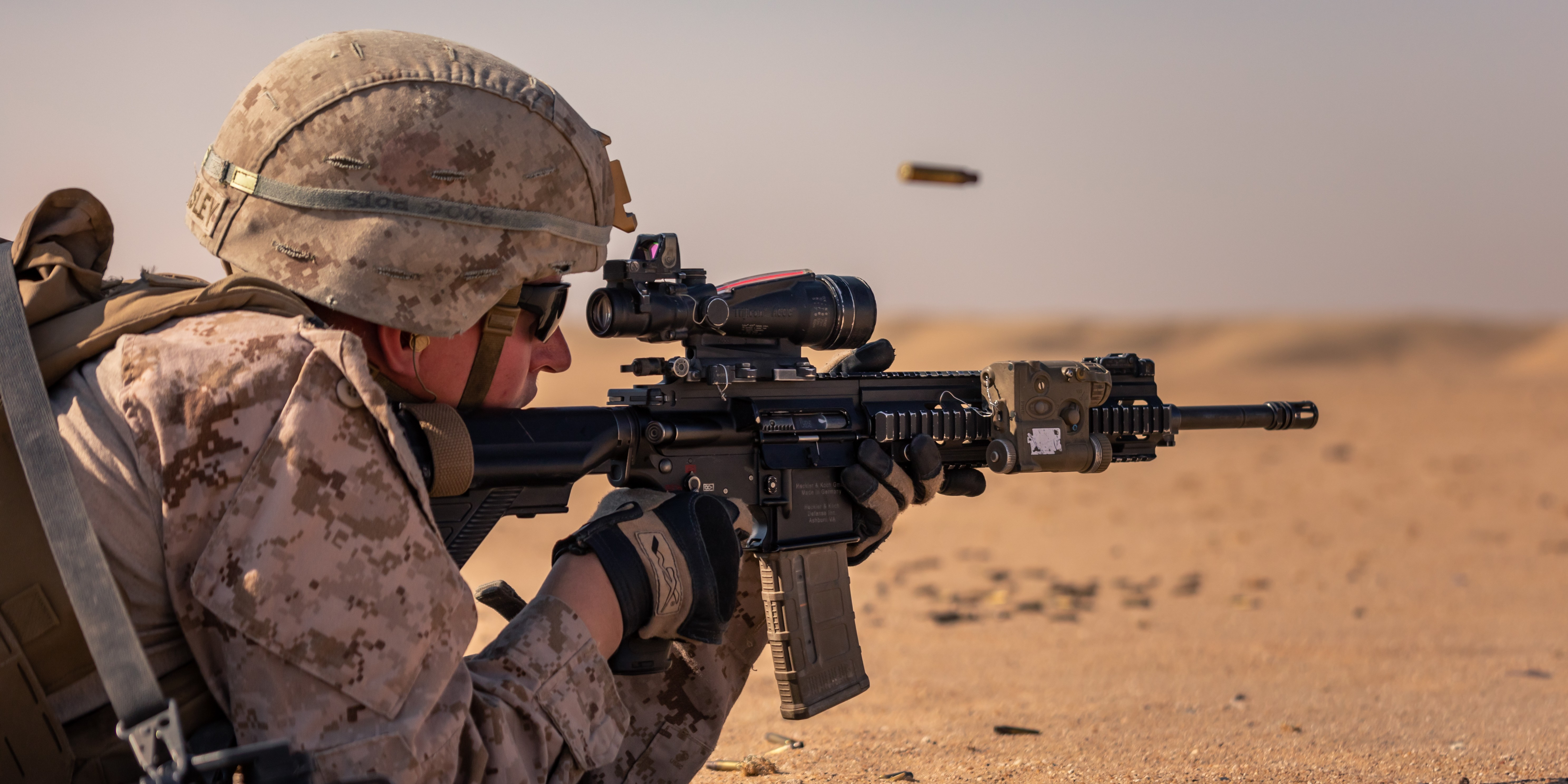
M27 with a Squad Day Optic (SDO) and AN/PEQ-16

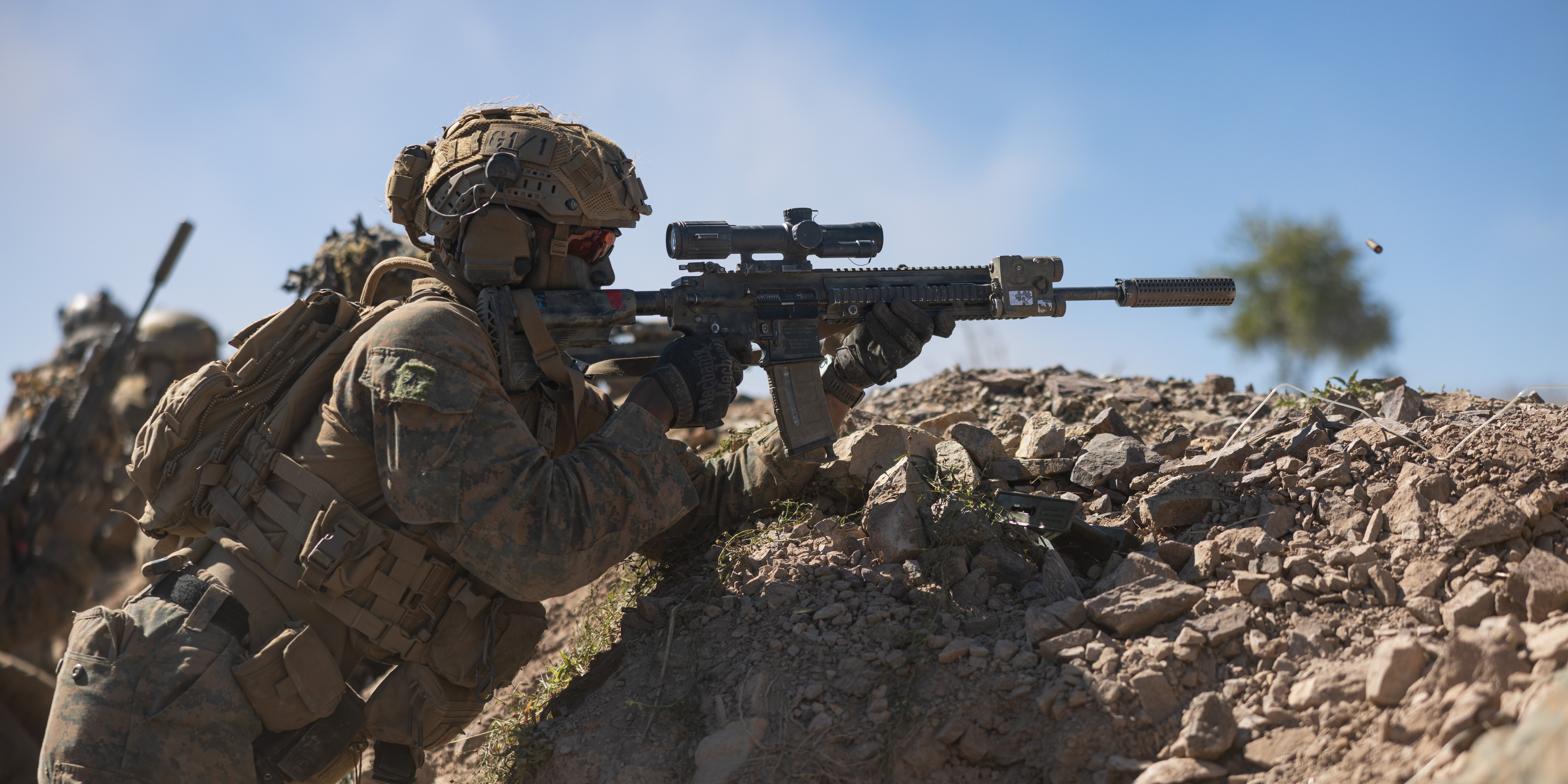
M27 with Squad Common Optic (SCO), KAC NT4 QDSS suppressor, and AN/PEQ-16

== Variants ==
=== M38 SDMR ===
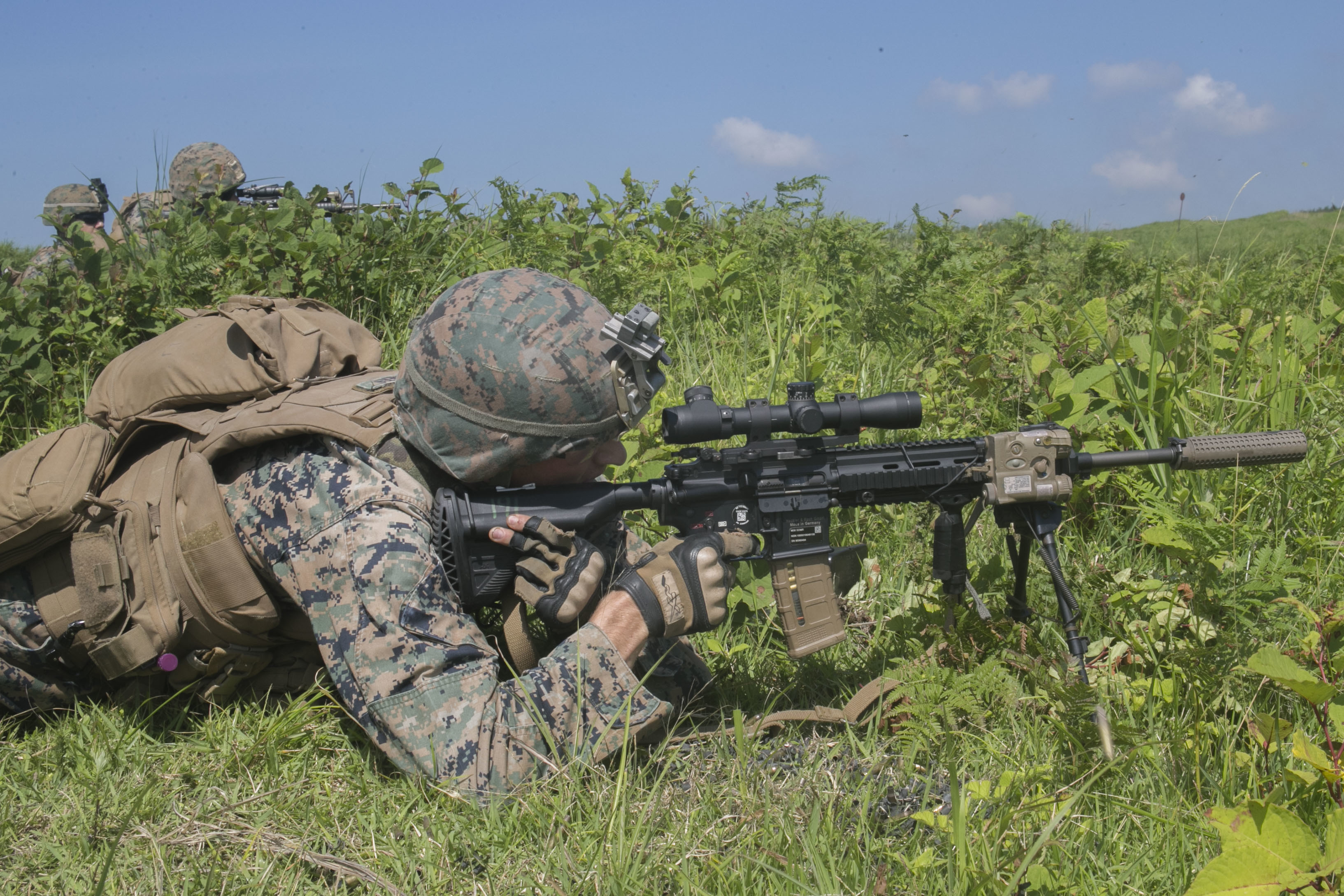
A Marine from 2nd Battalion, 5th Marines handling an M38 DMR

The M38 Squad Designated Marksman rifle (M38 SDMR) is essentially the same as the M27 IAR and retains its selective fire capabilities. The only difference is that it is fitted with a Leupold TS-30A2 Mark 4 MR/T 2.5-8x36mm variable power scope, the same optic fitted on the Mk 12 Special Purpose Rifle. Although certain selected M27s had been employed as marksman rifles since 2016, the M38 version uses an optic with greater magnification. The naming of the M38 followed a similar convention to the M27, being named after the 3rd Battalion, 8th Marines unit that tested the rifle.

By April 2018, fielding to all three Marine expeditionary forces had been completed. One M38 marksman version, fitted with a scope and QDSS suppressor, is to be fielded per infantry squad to engage targets out to 600 meters. Full operational capability is planned for September 2018.

=== M27 RWK ===
The M27 Reconnaissance Weapons Kit (RWK) is a variant of the M27 with an 11-inch (279 mm) barrel used by US Recon Marines in a demand for "shorter barreled URG" for close quarters combat.

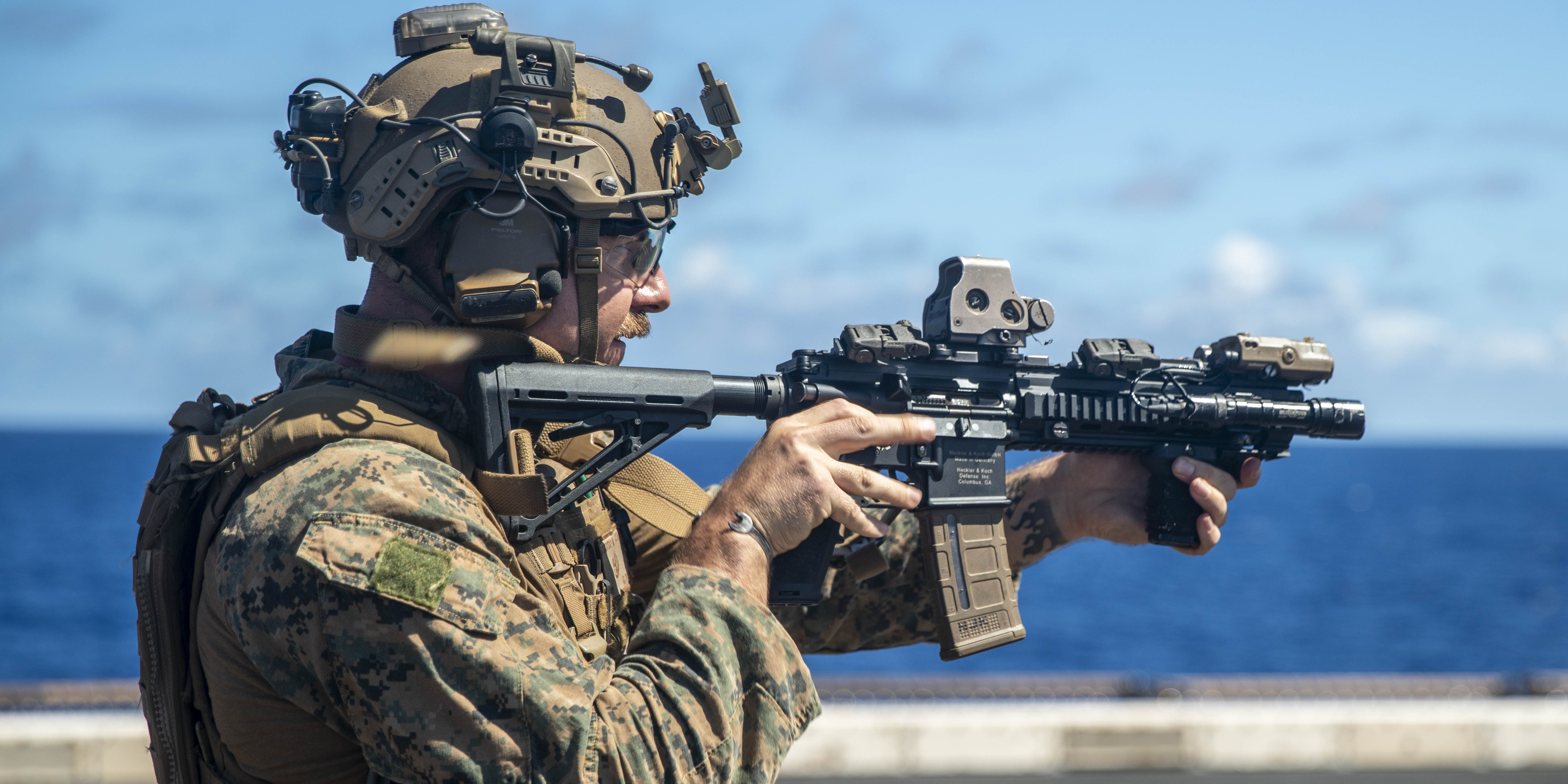
M27 Reconnaissance Weapons Kit (RWK)

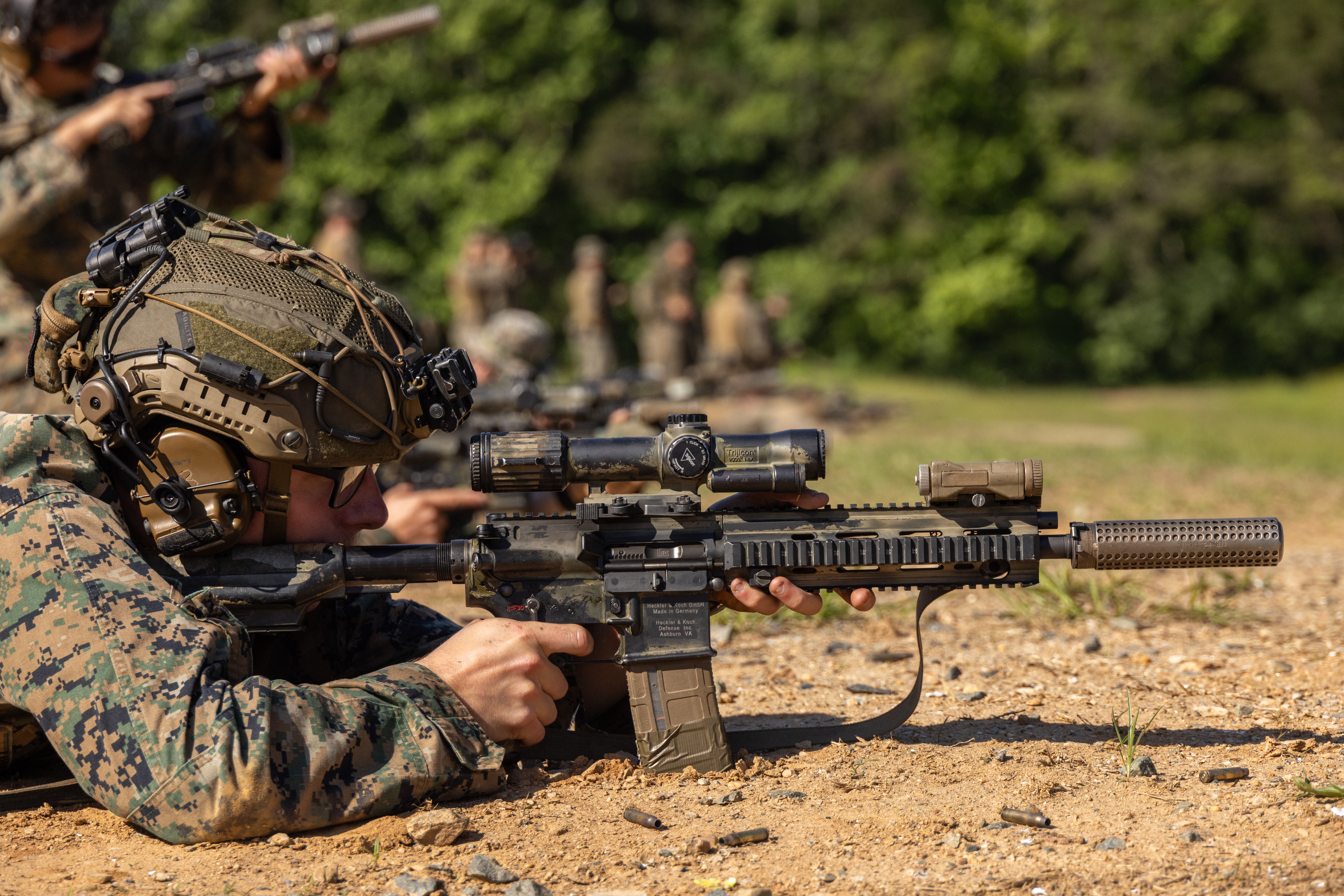
A Marine from 3rd Battalion, 2nd Marines firing an M27 RWK

== See also ==
- Colt Automatic Rifle
- L86 LSW
- M1918 BAR
- QJB-95
- HAMR IAR
- G95
- M7 rifle
- RPK
- Steyr AUG HBAR
- Ultimax 100
