= Istituto Centrale per gli Archivi =

Coordinates: 41.9061°N 12.5087°E

Istituto centrale per gli archivi

Public entity overview
- Formed: 1998-10-20
- Jurisdiction: Italy
- Website: https://icar.cultura.gov.it/

The Istituto Centrale per gli Archivi (ICAR) is the Italian Central Institute for Archives. It is housed in a building on Viale Castro Pretorio in Rome.

ICAR is one of the central institutes of the Ministry of Culture, coordinated and directed by the General Directorate of Archives and, under its supervision, in agreement with the General Directorate of Budget of the same ministry.

== History ==
ICAR was established by Legislative Decree 20 1998, n. 368 which, in paragraph 4, states: "The Central Office for Archives is established at the Ministry with the competences of defining standards for the inventory and formation of archives, research and study, and application of new technologies". The actual establishment of the Institute dates back, however, to 2006 when some rooms were identified and made available within the offices of the National Central Library of Rome.

The administrative organization, the responsibilities, the definitions of the areas of competence are consequent to the structure of the Ministry changed by effect of the Presidential Decree of 26 November 2007, n. 233, published in the Ordinary Supplement to the Official Journal on 17 July 2009.

In March 2010 the offices were transferred to via Sommacampagna and then returned, from 2013, to the National Central Library of Rome.

With the Prime Ministerial Decree of 2 December 2019, no. 169, published in the Official Journal no. 16 of 21-01-2020, the Central Institute for Archives, while continuing to functionally depend on the General Directorate of Archives, was placed among the central institutes with autonomy over which the Central Institute for the digitization of cultural heritage, Digital Library, carries out management functions; human and instrumental resources are assigned to it by the General Directorate of Education, Research and Cultural Institutes, in agreement with the Digital Library, the General Directorate of Organization and the General Directorate of Budget.

=== Directors ===
- Daniela Grana (ottobre 1998-agosto 2008)
- Luigi Londei (August 2008 – September 2009)
- Marina Giannetto (September 2009 – May 2015)
- Mauro Tosti Croce ad interim (May - September 2015)
- Stefano Vitali (October 2015 – June 2020)
- Elisabetta Reale (June 2020 – April 2022)
- Sabrina Mingarelli (May 2022 – May 2024)
- Chiara Veninata (May 2024 - ongoing)
