= Cars (surname) =

Cars is a surname. Notable people with the surname include:

- Hadar Cars (born 1933), Swedish politician
- Jean-François Cars (1661–1739), French engraver
- Laurent Cars (1699–1771), French designer and engraver
