= Ares Shrike 5.56 =

Shrike 5.56
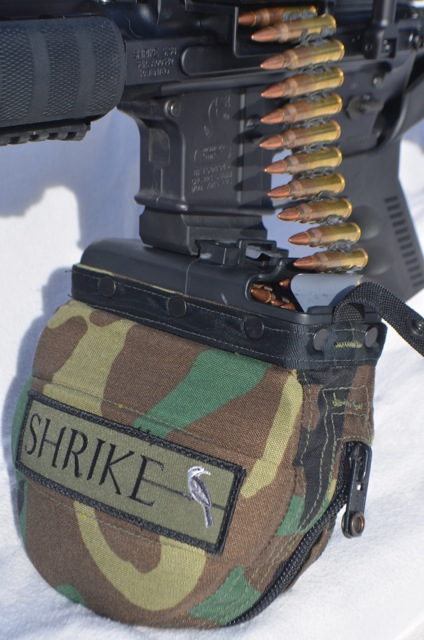
- A Shrike 5.56 with a 200-round M249 ammunition belt pouch and an Ares magazine well adapter block
- Type: Semi-automatic rifle, light machine gun
- Place of origin: United States

Production history
- Manufacturer: Ares Defense (formerly); Fightlite (currently)
- Produced: 2002–present

Specifications
- Mass: 3.4 kg (7.5 lb)
- Length: 711–1016 mm (28–40 in); Depends on barrel option
- Barrel length: 330–508 mm (13.0–20.0 in); 406 mm (16.0 in) standard
- Cartridge: 5.56×45mm NATO
- Action: Gas-operated, short-stroke tappet
- Feed system: Various STANAG magazines or disintegrating ammo belt or 100-round drum
- Sights: Iron or various optics

The Ares Defense Shrike 5.56 is an air-cooled, dual-feed light machine gun/rifle for semi or full-auto configurations that fires the 5.56×45mm NATO cartridge. The Shrike 5.56 is sold as either as a complete weapon, or as an upper receiver "performance upgrade kit" to existing AR-15 and M16-type service rifles and carbines. The name comes from the Shrike, a carnivorous passerine bird, and was designed by Geoffrey Herring.

== Overview ==
The Shrike 5.56 has gas-piston operation, a quick-change barrel with fixed headspace and MIL-STD-1913 rail interface for the mounting of accessories. It can utilize standard 30-round STANAG magazines, 100-round Beta C-Mag drum magazines, and M27-linked SAW ammunition from 100-round or 200-round "soft-pouches" and 200-round hard plastic SAW ammunition containers. At 7.5 lbs complete weapon weight, the Shrike 5.56 is lighter than other comparable squad automatic weapons, such as the M249 light machine gun and Heckler & Koch MG4. The design also appears to be also influenced by a multitude of weapons, including the Stoner 63. It features a short-stroke impinging gas piston system.

== Variants ==
There exist some notable differences between the current model and the older prototypes.

EXP-1
The initial proof-of-concept prototype. It features a modified M249 handguard, a unique firing mechanism and a quick-detach barrel latch derived from the Stoner 63.
EXP-2
This improved prototype featured a new Picatinny rail handguard, an improved firing mechanism using some M16 components, and a new barrel latch similar to that of the M60 machine gun.
03A
The production model. It has a compact side-mounted gas system different from the previous prototypes, and its firing mechanism is also significantly modified. Early production runs had a circular handguard. More recent production Shrikes have a Picatinny rail handguard. The barrel latch and some other components are similar to the EXP-1.
ARES-16SPW receiver
This receiver was designed by Ares specifically for the Shrike system. It is identical to the mil-spec M16 receiver, except its magazine well is cut away to save space. Shrikes mounted on this receiver can only use M249 box magazines with linked munitions, but they have a smaller vertical profile.
Ares AAR
Lightweight Infantry Automatic Rifle for squad support. Features quick-change barrel, telescoping stock, MIL-STD-1913 optics mount and rail interface handguard with USMC Grip-Pod system. Feeds from 30- and 100-round magazines and can be user-configured to dual-feed (belt and magazine) in minutes with optional belt-feed module.
Ares AAR/C
Ultra-Compact Infantry Automatic Rifle for squad support. Features quick-change barrel, side-folding stock, MIL-STD-1913 optics mount and rail interface handguard. Feeds from 30- and 100-round magazines. Compact design maximizes portability and dismounted maneuverability. This production variant can be fitted with multiple Picatinny rails. These enable it to mount various commercial scopes, flashlights, lasers, and even secondary underbarrel weapons such as grenade launchers and shotguns.
