= Colt IAR6940 =

American-made light machine gun

Colt Infantry Automatic Rifle 6940
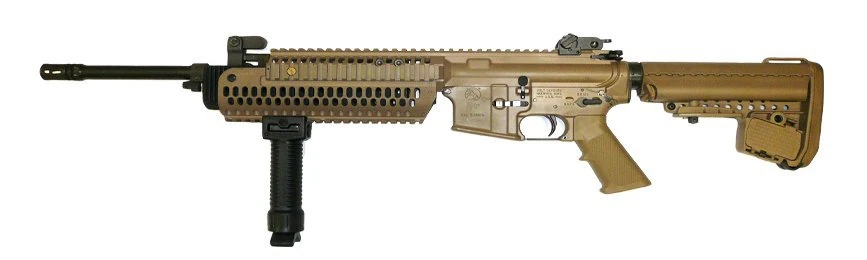
- The Colt IAR 6940 in FDE camo
- Type: Light machine gun Squad automatic weapon
- Place of origin: United States

Service history
- In service: 2010–present
- Used by: See Users

Production history
- Designer: Phil Hinckley
- Designed: 2008
- Manufacturer: Colt's Manufacturing Company
- Variants: See variants

Specifications
- Mass: 6940 & 6940E-SG unloaded: 4.32 kg (9.52 lb); 6940 & 6940E-SG loaded (30-round STANAG): 4.95 kg (10.91 lb); 6940H unloaded: 4.58 kg (10.1 lb); 6940H loaded (30-round STANAG): 5.21 kg (11.49 lb)
- Length: 851 mm (33.5 in) stock retracted, 934 mm (36.8 in) stock extended
- Barrel length: 406 mm (16 in)
- Cartridge: 5.56×45mm NATO
- Caliber: 5.56 mm (0.22 in)
- Action: Gas Operated, Rotating bolt
- Rate of fire: Cyclic: 700–1000 rounds per minute
- Muzzle velocity: 2900 ft/s (884 m/s) (M855)
- Effective firing range: 600 m (656 yd)
- Feed system: 30 round STANAG M16 box magazine, 100–150 round Beta C-Mag, PMAG D-60 Magazine
- Sights: Iron sights or Picatinny rail for various optical sights

The Colt Infantry Automatic Rifle 6940 (commonly shortened to Colt IAR or IAR6940) is a light machine gun designed by Phil Hinckley and manufactured by American firearms manufacturer Colt.

== History ==
=== Background ===
On March 27, 2008, the United States Marine Corps issued a Purchase Description outlining the requirements for the Infantry Automatic Rifle (IAR) to potential manufacturers. The Marines were specifically looking for designs that met precise criteria.

The primary objective of the IAR Program was to replace the M249 Squad Automatic Weapon (SAW) with a single-infantry marine-operated automatic rifle that prioritized lightweight and ease of portability to enhance dismounted maneuverability. The IAR would be a non-developmental, 5.56mm automatic rifle that would be more durable and reliable than the M249 SAW.

The Marine Corps put across a specified kit that would accompany the IAR, which were a rear aperture sight (Matech BUIS), a blank firing adapter, cleaning kit, Grip Pod, 3-point sling, an operators' manual and sufficient magazines to hold 300 rounds of ammunition.

=== US Trials ===
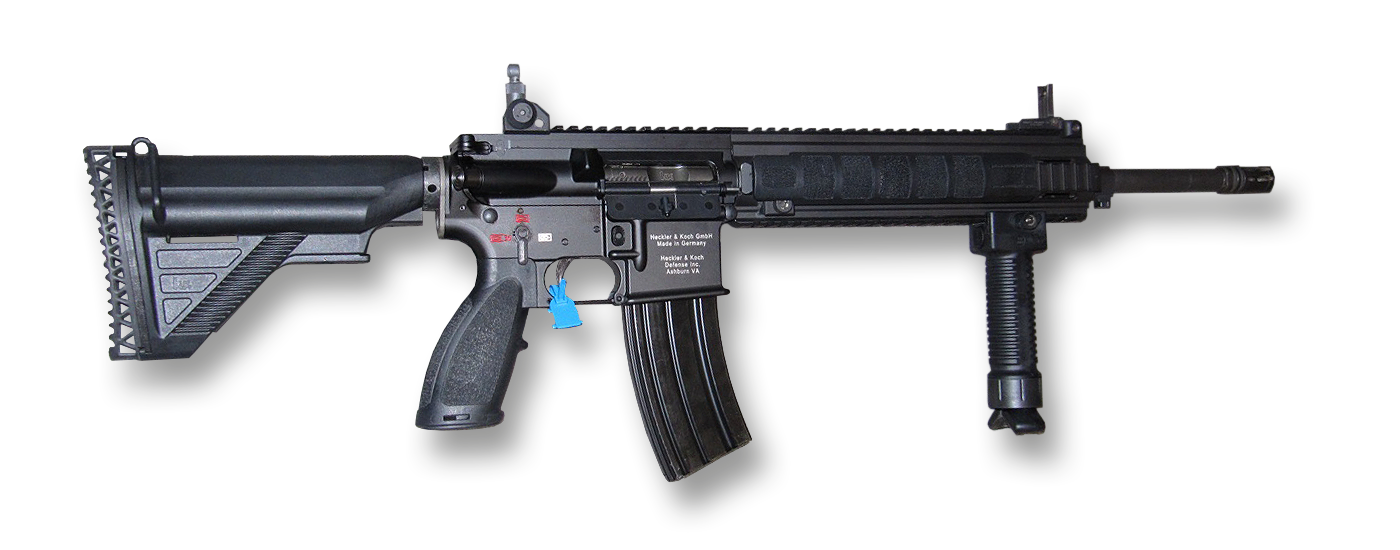
The M27 IAR won the USMC IAR program, beating out the IAR 6940, IAR 6940H and SCAR HAMR in supplementing the M249.

Colt Defense was awarded two contracts for each of their entries into the program; the IAR6940 and IAR6940H. The IAR6940 is marginally heavier than the IAR6940H at 10.1 lb (4.6 kg) compared to the latter at 9.28 lb (4.21 kg), with the main reason being that the IAR6940 sported a monolithic upper receiver while the IAR6940H used a lighter Knight's Armament Handguard. Colt submitted the two variants as contenders for to the IAR program.

With the kit, both models met the desired specifications of the USMC and were able to make it to the finals of the contest. However, it ultimately lost the contest to Heckler & Koch's M27 IAR. The rifle therefore never saw widespread usage in the U.S. Military but was released to the civilian market in 2017, albeit at a very low quantity at only 200 units by the U.S. Armament Company.

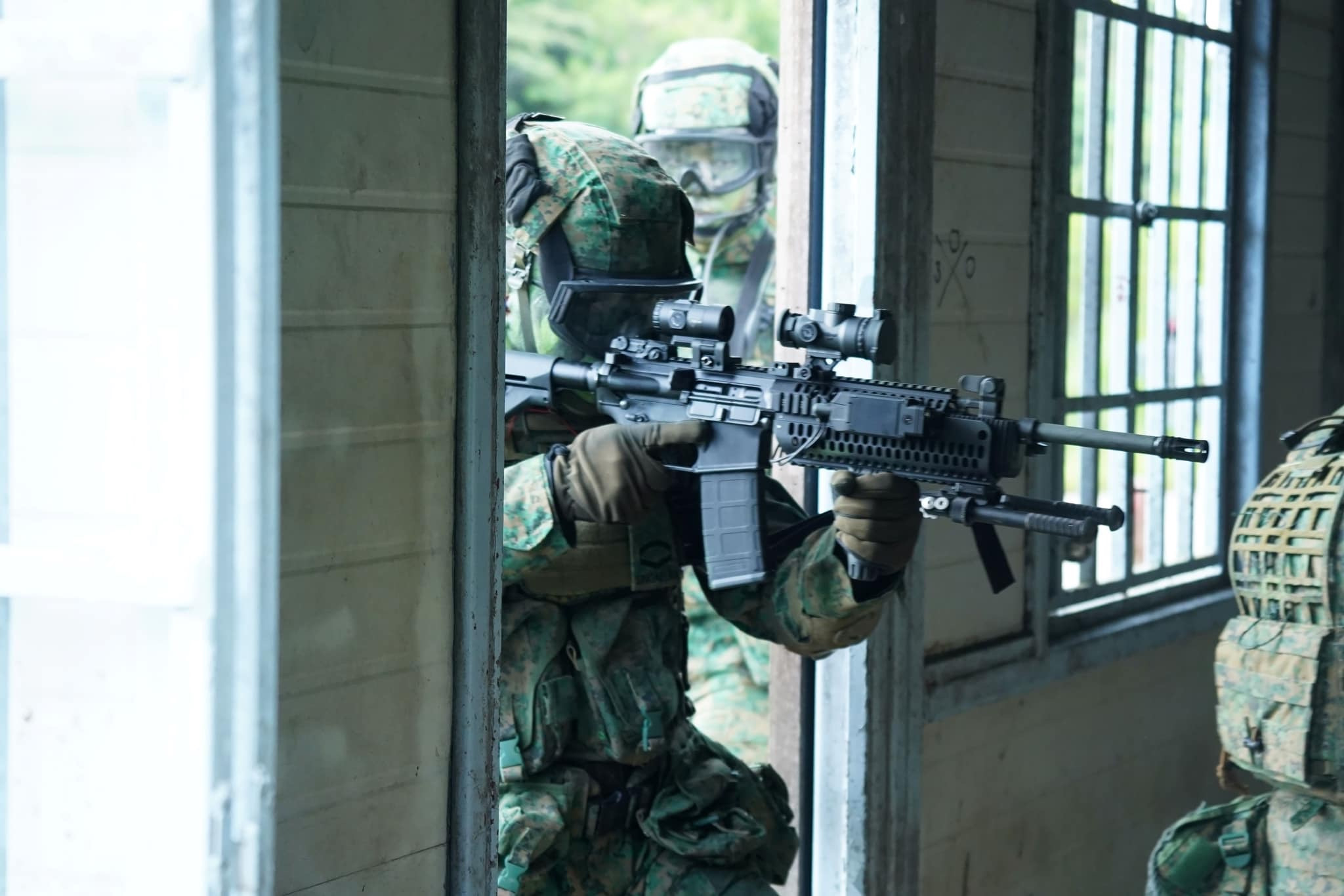
An SAF (Singapore Armed Forces) soldier entering a house with the Colt IAR6940E-SG

== Design ==
The IAR6940 is a magazine-fed light machine gun. It fires the 5.56×45mm NATO cartridge. The rifle accepts AR-15 magazines, such as STANAG, PMAG and drum magazines.

As a part of the IAR Program, it was built to be lighter and more portable than the M249. It weighs 4.32 kg (9.5 lb) compared to the M249 at 7.5 kg (17 lb). With the stock extended, it is 934 mm (36.8 in) in length.

The weapon uses a closed bolt, gas operated and air‐cooled system using direct impingement very similar to the CAR-15. The gas developed from the fired cartridge is vented directly towards the bolt, sending it rearward to cycle the action. This contributes to the weapon's lighter weight and reduces wear on parts.

All military models of the IAR6940 have select-fire capabilities between semi-automatic and full automatic. The rifle's gas regulator can be adjusted depending on the ammunition or desired fire rate (from 700 to 1000 rounds per minute).

The upper receiver is a monolithic design with the upper hand guard integrated. Features include a full-length MIL-STD-1913 Picatinny rail on the top, followed by 2 shorter rails on either side of the hand guard, with venting adjacent along the top side. Other characteristics of the upper receiver are largely similar to that of the M4/M16-type rifles, like the forward assist, cartridge deflector, and ejection port cover. The IAR6490 typically comes with a Matech BUIS Rear Sight, but many configurations also include accessories such as optics and lasers.

A large heat sink is implemented on the lower hand guard, which is aimed to increase the time it takes for the firearm to cook-off under extended periods of fire due to overheating. It can be replaced or equipped with grip attachments. Most configurations of the IAR6940 come with a Grip Pod (a vertical foregrip with an integrated bipod) for increased stability.

The bolt assembly is identical to the M4's and also shares the same factory charging handle and bolt carrier group. The lower receiver of the IAR6940 is functionally similar to the M4's as well with some changes including an ambidextrous fire selector and magazine release. The rear includes a H3 Buffer Tube which supports most AR stocks but comes default with a VLTOR E-Mod stock.

The barrel is 16 in (410 mm) in length. It is internally chrome-plated, with progressive 1/7 right-hand parabolic twist rifling. As a requirement for the USMC IAR Program, it has a bayonet stud for bayonet mounting and a folding front sight. It is equipped with a compensator for reduced recoil.

== Variants ==
Model	Description	Reference
Colt Infantry Automatic Rifle 6940	The default model of the Colt IAR. It features a monolithic upper receiver, increasing stability while also slighting increasing the weight with respect to the other models. The standard configuration includes a compensator, a Matech BUIS Sight and 30 round STANAG magazines. It is used by the Mexican Navy as support weapons in the Naval Infantry Corps.	
Colt Infantry Automatic Rifle 6940H	A variant jointly developed by Knight's Armament Company (KAC). It includes many modifications that were designed and created by KAC, such as the handguard, which weighed the weapon less than the IAR6940. The standard configuration includes a compensator, a KAC Rear Sight and 30 round STANAG magazines.The IAR6940H has since been discontinued by Colt following the conclusion of the IAR trial by the Marine Corps.	
Colt Infantry Automatic Rifle 6940P	A prototype variant that incorporated an external piston system in place of the direct gas impingement. It was a third model designed by Phil Hinckley but was never submitted into the US Marines' IAR Program.	
Colt Infantry Automatic Rifle 6940E-SG	A variant designed specifically for the Singapore Army. It is equipped with a red dot sight with a 3x magnifier scope as well as a multi-purpose Laser Aiming Device (LAD) capable of 4 modes, visible or infra-red (IR) laser, IR illuminator.	

== Adoption ==
=== Mexico ===
In 2010, the Colt IAR6940 was selected and sold to the Naval Infantry Corps of the Mexican Navy and is widely used in the ongoing drug war in Mexico.

=== Singapore ===
In 2023, Ministry of Defense Singapore performed trials for the New Section Automatic Weapon (NSAW) program, which would replace the aging Ultimax 100 which has been in use for roughly 42 years.

The new Light Machine Gun, the IAR6940E-SG, is a new variant of the Colt IAR that was evaluated and procured in partnership with the Defence Science and Technology Agency and has been assessed to be a suitable successor to the Ultimax 100.

It was introduced to the Singapore Army on April 24, 2024, and fully replaced the Ultimax 100 on the end of July 2024, as troops underwent more training on the Colt IAR6940.

The IAR6940E-SG uses a configuration that comes with a Red dot sight, a 3× Magnifier, a Laser Aiming Device and a foregrip. The modifications allowed for increased combat effectiveness and ergonomics.

== Users ==
- Mexico - Naval Infantry Corps
- Singapore - Singapore Armed Forces
- United States - Los Angeles County Sheriff's Department
