= Stoner 63 =

NATO modular weapon system

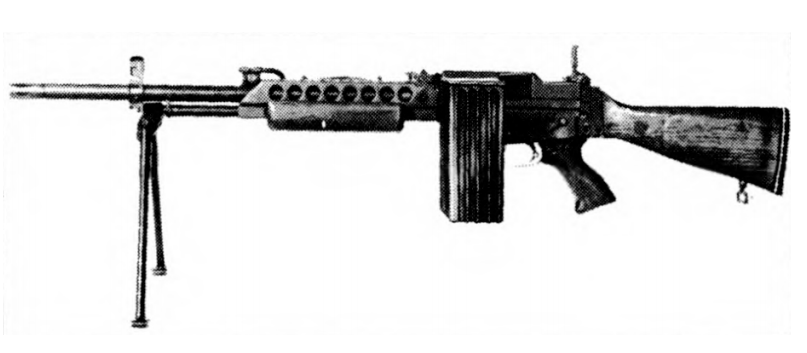
- Stoner 63 configured as a light machine gun
- Type: Modular weapon system; Carbine; Assault rifle; Light machine gun; Squad automatic weapon
- Place of origin: United States

Service history
- In service: 1963–1983 (U.S.)
- Used by: United States Navy SEALs; United States Marine Corps
- Wars: Vietnam War; Invasion of Grenada

Production history
- Designer: Eugene Stoner; L. James Sullivan; Robert Fremont
- Designed: 1963
- Manufacturer: Cadillac Gage; Knight's Armament Company; NWM De Kruithoorn N.V. (prototypes only)
- Produced: 1963–1971
- No. built: Approx. 4,000 (both versions)
- Variants: See Variants

Specifications
- Mass: LMG, MMG: 11.68 lb (5.30 kg); FMG: 10.31 lb (4.68 kg); Commando: 10.50 lb (4.76 kg); AR: 10.19 lb (4.62 kg); Rifle: 7.90 lb (3.58 kg); Carbine: 7.75 lb (3.52 kg)
- Length: LMG, MMG, AR, Rifle: 40.25 in (1,022 mm); Carbine: 36.68 in (931.7 mm) stock extended/26.60 in (675.6 mm) stock collapsed; Commando: 35.95 in (913.1 mm); FMG: 30.38 in (771.7 mm)
- Barrel length: LMG, MMG, FMG, AR, Rifle: 20 in (508.0 mm); Carbine, Commando: 15.7 in (398.8 mm)
- Cartridge: 5.56×45mm NATO
- Action: Gas-operated long stoke piston, rotating bolt
- Rate of fire: LMG, MMG, FMG: 700–1,000 rounds/min; AR, Rifle, Carbine, Commando: 700–900 rounds/min
- Muzzle velocity: LMG, MMG, FMG, AR, Rifle: 3,250 ft/s (991 m/s); Carbine, Commando: 3,050 ft/s (929.6 m/s)
- Effective firing range: 200–1000 m
- Maximum firing range: 2653 m
- Feed system: LMG, MMG, FMG: Disintegrating M27 ammunition belt; AR, Rifle, Carbine, Commando: 20- or 30-round detachable box magazine; LMG: 75-, 100-, 150-round drum magazine (post–Vietnam War model, rare, used by SEALs)
- Sights: Iron sights

The Stoner 63 is a 5.56×45mm NATO modular weapon system. Using a variety of modular components, it can be configured as an assault rifle, carbine, top-fed light machine gun, belt-fed squad automatic weapon, or as a vehicle mounted weapon. Also known as the M63, XM22, XM23, XM207 or the Mk 23 MOD 0 machine gun, it was designed by Eugene Stoner in the early 1960s. Cadillac Gage was the primary manufacturer of the Stoner 63 during its history. The Stoner 63 saw very limited combat use by US military units during the Vietnam War. A few were also sold to law enforcement agencies.

== History ==
=== Development ===
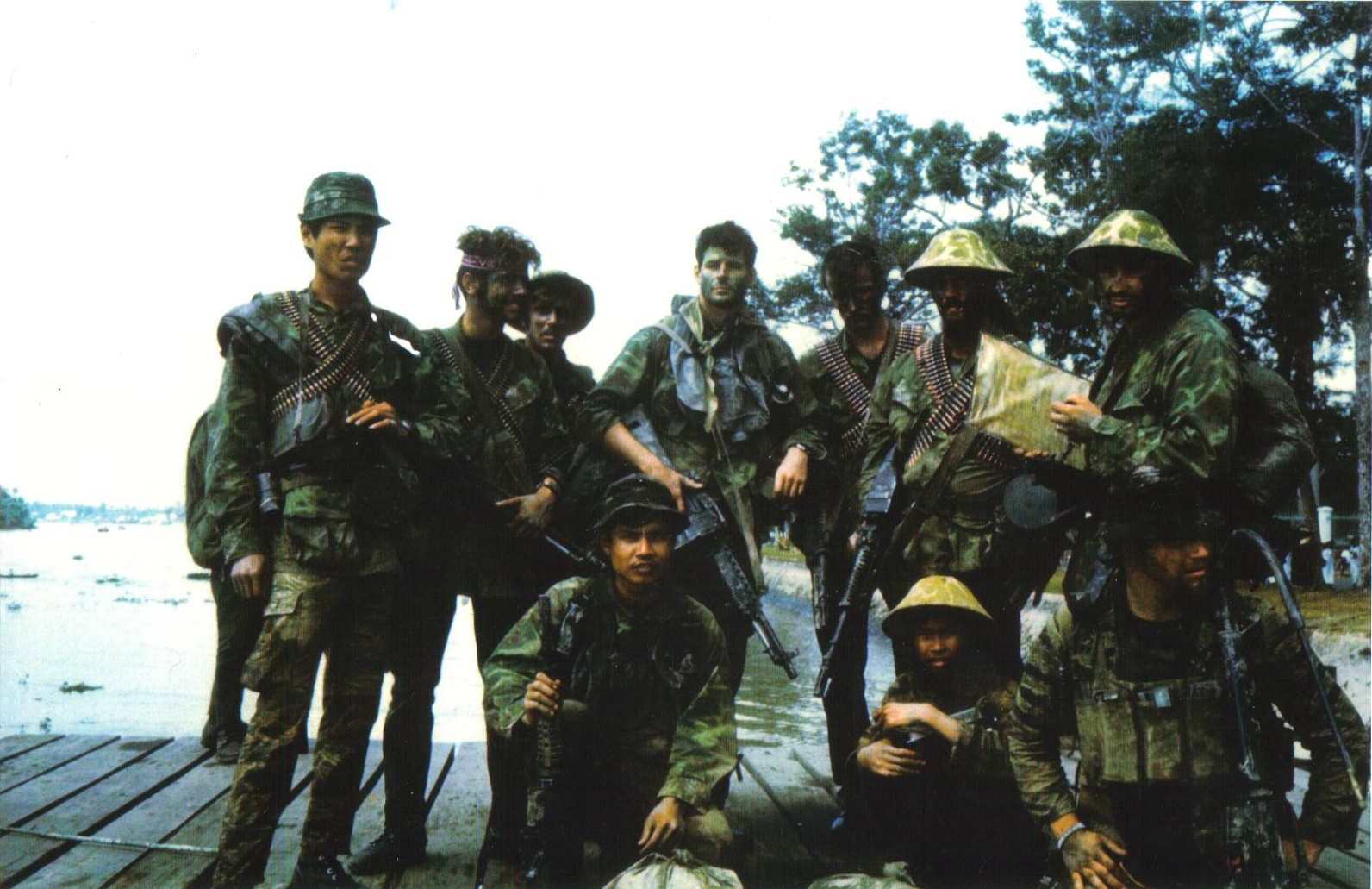
United States Navy SEALs pose for a photo somewhere in Vietnam, 1970. The SEAL in the center of the group is carrying a Stoner 63A1 Mk 23 Mod 0 Commando with a short 15.7 in (398.8 mm) barrel.

Soon after leaving ArmaLite, Eugene Stoner, one of the United States' most prolific modern military small arms designers, responsible for the design of the ArmaLite AR-15/M16 assault rifles, ArmaLite AR-10 battle rifle and Armalite AR-7 survival rifle, among others, devised a concept for a modular weapon that would be built around a common receiver and certain interchangeable components and could be transformed into a rifle, carbine or various machine gun configurations by simply fitting the appropriate parts to the basic assembly.

Stoner managed to solicit the help of Howard Carson, in charge of Cadillac Gage's West Coast plant in Costa Mesa, California (where Armalite was also located), in convincing the company's president, Russell Baker, of the feasibility and commercial potential of his new weapons system. Baker obliged and Cadillac Gage (a subsidiary of the Ex-Cell-O Corporation) established a small arms development branch in Costa Mesa. Stoner then recruited his two principal aides at Armalite: Robert Fremont and James L. Sullivan (who would later design the Ultimax 100 light machine gun for the Chartered Industries of Singapore).

The first working prototype was chambered in 7.62×51mm NATO and completed in 1962. It was designated the Stoner M69W (for no other reason than when turned upside down it reads the same, symbolizing Stoner's vision of a fully invertible receiver). The follow-up design, called the Stoner 62, also chambered in 7.62×51mm, was intended for mass production. However, the design team decided to focus on the 5.56×45mm small caliber high-velocity cartridge, as it appeared the new round was gaining mainstream military approval. Eugene Stoner had previously worked with the cartridge when he designed the AR-15. The weapon system using the smaller cartridge was known as the Stoner 63. The first models were produced in February 1963. The Costa Mesa facility produced 234 Stoner 63s, when production was then moved in September 1964 to the Cadillac Gage plant in Warren, Michigan. With the change in manufacturing plants, polycarbonate plastic was used for the stocks and grips instead of wood. The weapon is covered under U.S. patent 3,198,076.

=== Trials ===
On March 4, 1963, the Department of Defense's Advanced Research Projects Agency made the first purchase of the Stoner 63, ordering 25 units in various configurations. In August and September 1963, the Stoner 63 was sent to the Marines Corps Landing Force Development Center at Quantico for evaluation, where it made a positive impression with its light weight and high ammunition capacity; the Marines favored the rifle and light machine gun configurations. Trials were performed by the Army Materiel Command (responsible for logistical support for the Marine Corps) at their own test facilities.

Many bugs affected the outcome of the Army trials of the gun: the ammunition requirements proposed were unrealistic and the weapon was expected to perform with an extremely wide range of port pressures, leaving very little power reserve with some ammunition types. For instance, the tracer ammunition used in the Stoner 63 was of such low pressure that it even failed to function reliably in the M16.

These factors severely affected the weapon's reliability. After several months of testing, the Stoner 63 system was ultimately deemed to be unacceptable for service use. The Army submitted recommendations for improvements to the design—these included a stainless steel gas cylinder, a two-position fire selector with separate safety, ejection port dust covers and modifications to the belt feed mechanism. The upgrades resulted in the improved Stoner 63A, which began production in 1966. Only about 2,000 examples of the initial version were manufactured before the transition to the model 63A.

XM207 upgrades

From 1969 to 1971 Cadillac Gage Co initiated a program to upgrade the Stoner 63 light machine gun due to Marine Corps interest. They were given one last chance to make design improvements and have a final test by the Army Materiel Command. Several changes were made to the weapon, soon to be designated "XM207 Light Machine Gun". Misfires, high cyclic rates, jams and link separations were among the issues to be resolved.

The 63A used a stack of Belleville spring washers to absorb some of the shock and bounce when the firing pin struck the primer. By changing the configuration of the washers, a higher spring rate was achieved, and this was the solution for the bulk of the misfires.

The weapon, when cold, would fire at about 650 rounds per minute (rpm). When it was very hot, after several hundred rounds had been fired, the cyclic rate climbed as high as 1,100 rpm. The mechanical functions of the weapon just would not work properly at these high rates. There were several problems that occurred at high RPM, including link separation. A "rate regulator" similar to that used in M60 machine gun was installed in the buttstock. It was basically a shock absorber (designed by Cadillac Gage Co) that eliminated the recoil bounce off the back plate. This allowed the main drive spring to control the forward velocity of the carrier. With the "rate regulator" installed the cyclic rate of the weapon was limited to about 800 rpm. This resolved the mechanical malfunctions that occurred above 1,000 rpm. In combination with the "rate regulator" changes were made to the belt feed system for better reliability.

Another issue was low gas pressure when firing tracer rounds, causing failures to cycle. The addition of an expandable steel sealing ring in the gas chamber kept the external gas leaks to a minimum, retaining enough gas pressure to cycle the action reliably. The next issue was the polycarbonate buttstock being unable to withstand the 5,000+ pound recoil force of firing anti-tank grenades. With the weapon's tight weight restriction, using a heavier metal buttstock was not an option. Several ribbed designs were evaluated, but none were successful. The solution was to pressure-fill the hollow buttstock with a lightweight urethane foam, imparting structural rigidity and high impact strength. This solved the problem without going over the weight limit, and made the buttstock extremely durable.

Several weapons with these improvements were produced by Cadillac Gage for testing by the Army Materiel Command. This would be the last chance for the weapon, now designated XM207. With its latest design changes, the weapon passed all tests. But soon afterwards, president Nixon announced that the United States would be withdrawing from Vietnam, eliminating the urgency to adopt a new infantry weapon. The XM207 project was cancelled.

=== Deployment ===
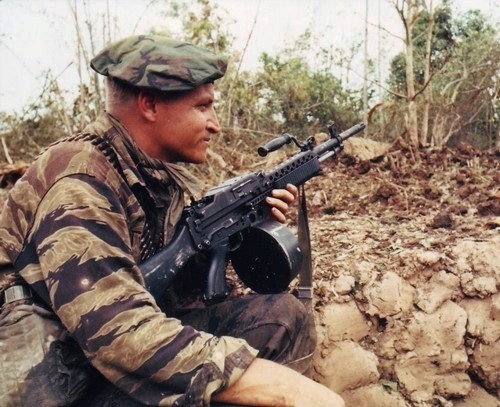
A Navy SEAL stonerman in Vietnam keeps his Stoner 63 light machine gun at the ready while the rest of his squad prepares demolition charges on a Vietcong bunker. The weapon is fitted with a 150-round drum belt container and is fed from the left-hand side. The retracting handle is locked forward and the ejection port closed with a dust cover to minimize dirt entry.

Even very early on in its development stage, a small number of weapons were hurriedly pressed into service with the U.S. Navy SEALs deployed to Southeast Asia. During 1967, the Stoner 63A system was field tested by Company L (Lima Company), 3rd Battalion, 1st Marine Regiment, 1st Marine Division. Riflemen were issued the weapon in the Rifle configuration (in both 63 and 63A variants, designated XM22 and XM22E1 respectively), while officers and certain other personnel received the Carbine (XM23). The Automatic Rifle configuration was deployed on a limited basis in the squad automatic role, while Lima's weapons platoon received both the LMG and MMG configurations.

In 1967, Dutch firm NWM (Nederlandsche Wapen-en Munitiefabriek) De Kruithoorn N.V. of 's-Hertogenbosch acquired licensing rights to manufacture and sell the weapon worldwide with the exception of the United States, Canada and Mexico. NWM assembled several prototypes but the company failed to secure any export customers and the weapon was withdrawn.

The Stoner 63 was also considered for the Swiss armed forces as the W+F Stgw 71 chambered in 5.6x48mm Eiger.

In 1970, the U.S. Army designated the light machine gun configuration XM207 and issued it to select Army Special Forces units for evaluation. However, due to its complexity and high maintenance requirements (especially when compared to the new M16), the design was rejected, and the project was dropped in 1971. That same year, Cadillac Gage ceased all production of the Stoner 63. Around 4,000 63 and 63A units were built in total. The Navy SEALs continued to use the Stoner 63 and had officially adopted the Commando version as the Mark 23 Mod 0 machine gun. By the late 1980s the Stoner 63 was completely phased out in favor of the new M249 SAW, and most of the remaining guns were destroyed.

== Design details ==
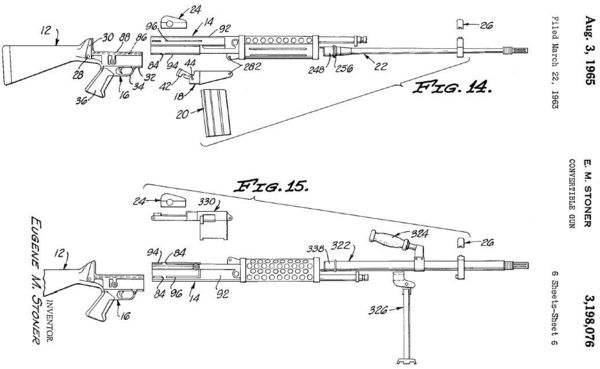
Drawing of Stoner 63 Modular Weapon System

=== Operating mechanism ===
The Stoner 63 series of weapons are piston driven, air-cooled, belt or magazine-fed and in rifle and carbine configuration, fire from a closed bolt to ensure maximum accuracy, or in machine gun mode, fire from the open bolt position to prevent cook-offs and enhance cooling. The weapon has a rotary bolt locking mechanism with 7 radially symmetrical locking lugs that engage a series of recesses in the barrel extension, and is actuated by a conventional long-stroke piston. The radial arrangement of locking lugs distributes the firing load evenly around the bolt head and barrel socket, reducing stress and increasing the longevity of these critical components. Attached to the piston extension is the bolt carrier which is equipped with a curved cam track that guides the bolt's cam pin (retained by the firing pin) and rotates the bolt 22.5° during the movement of the piston to either lock or unlock the bolt from behind the abutments in the barrel socket. Incorporated into the bolt carrier/piston group is an anti-bounce device, consisting of a 4 in (101.6 mm) carbide rod that rides within the piston extension's hollow interior and moves back and forth during the recoil and counter-recoil cycles, reducing bolt bounce and preventing the possibility of firing out of battery during closed bolt firing (in the Rifle/Carbine models).

When fired, propellant gases from the ignited cartridge following the projectile down the bore are vented through a gas port into a gas cylinder where they drive the piston and bolt carrier rearward. There is about 0.2 in (5.1 mm) of uninterrupted free travel calculated to permit the gas build-up in the bore to drop to a safe level before the carrier's cam slot rotates the bolt counter-clockwise to unlock. The locking lugs have no pitch therefore no primary extraction occurs during the unlocking sequence. A deeply seated spring-loaded claw extractor in the bolt head extracts the spent cartridge casing from the chamber and a spring-powered ejector fixed to the front feed mechanism trigger housing ejects the casing. The bolt carrier continues to the rear and compresses the captive recoil spring on its guide rod.

The Stoner 63 has a unique buffering system contained within the bolt carrier. In front of the carrier cap are a steel shim and a set of 27 saucer-shaped Belleville washers oriented in opposing sets of three, which absorb energy from the piston stroke by deforming into a flat plate when the bolt carrier strikes the receiver's end cap. When the plates return to their original shape they release a pulse of strain energy which propels the reciprocating parts forward in counter-recoil with a speed only slightly below that of the original recoil velocity. The plates will function without failure for between 40,000 and 50,000 rounds (depending upon the type of ammunition used and cyclic rates employed). This feature was designed to extend the weapon's service life.

=== Feeding ===
In the belt-fed configuration, belt movement is produced by a roller riding in the channeled feed arm and is actuated by the reciprocating movement of the bolt. The spring-loaded feed arm is protected by a hinged top cover and is pivoted at its rear end. As the bolt travels back, the front end of the feed arm moves across the feed tray and operates a lever attached to a single set of spring-loaded pawls. These pawls move a cartridge and link over the feed tray's stop pawl from where they are positioned onto the slotted feed path and held firmly in place by a spring-powered steel plate in the top cover. The cartridge is then pushed out of its link and the empty link is discarded through the link ejection port which is held closed by a spring-loaded dust cover.

The Stoner 63/63A is chambered for the now-standard 5.56×45mm intermediate rifle cartridge. When in the belt-fed role, the weapon would feed from a disintegrating metallic linked belt marked "S-63 BRW" which is a scaled-down version of the U.S. M13 link developed for the M60 GPMG. The Stoner 63/63A will not work reliably with the later M27 link developed for the M249 SAW. The belt is normally contained in a 150-round plastic ribbed container that has a tab allowing it to be clipped on to the side of the left-hand feed tray. Early ammunition boxes were olive drab in color and manufactured at Costa Mesa, this later changed to a black-colored plastic container made in Warren, Michigan. Stoner 63A boxes were also black but had a reduced capacity of 100 rounds as the larger container would unbalance the rifle. These can either be attached to the left-hand feed tray or held in a bottom box carrier when using the right-hand feed mechanism. Several drum-type belt carriers were designed for the left-hand feed system, with a 150-round drum container being the most popular and used frequently by SEALS in Vietnam. A 250-round drum carrier was also developed by NAWS China Lake, but this proved too heavy and cumbersome. SEALS would also resort to converting RPD belt carriers for use with their Stoners. The detachable magazines used in the Rifle, Carbine and Automatic Rifle models are fabricated from steel and weigh 8 oz (230 g) unloaded. In an effort to reduce weight, aluminum magazines were later developed cutting the weight down to 4 oz (110 g). Standard magazines have a 30-round cartridge capacity but a 20-round magazine was also offered.

=== Barrel ===
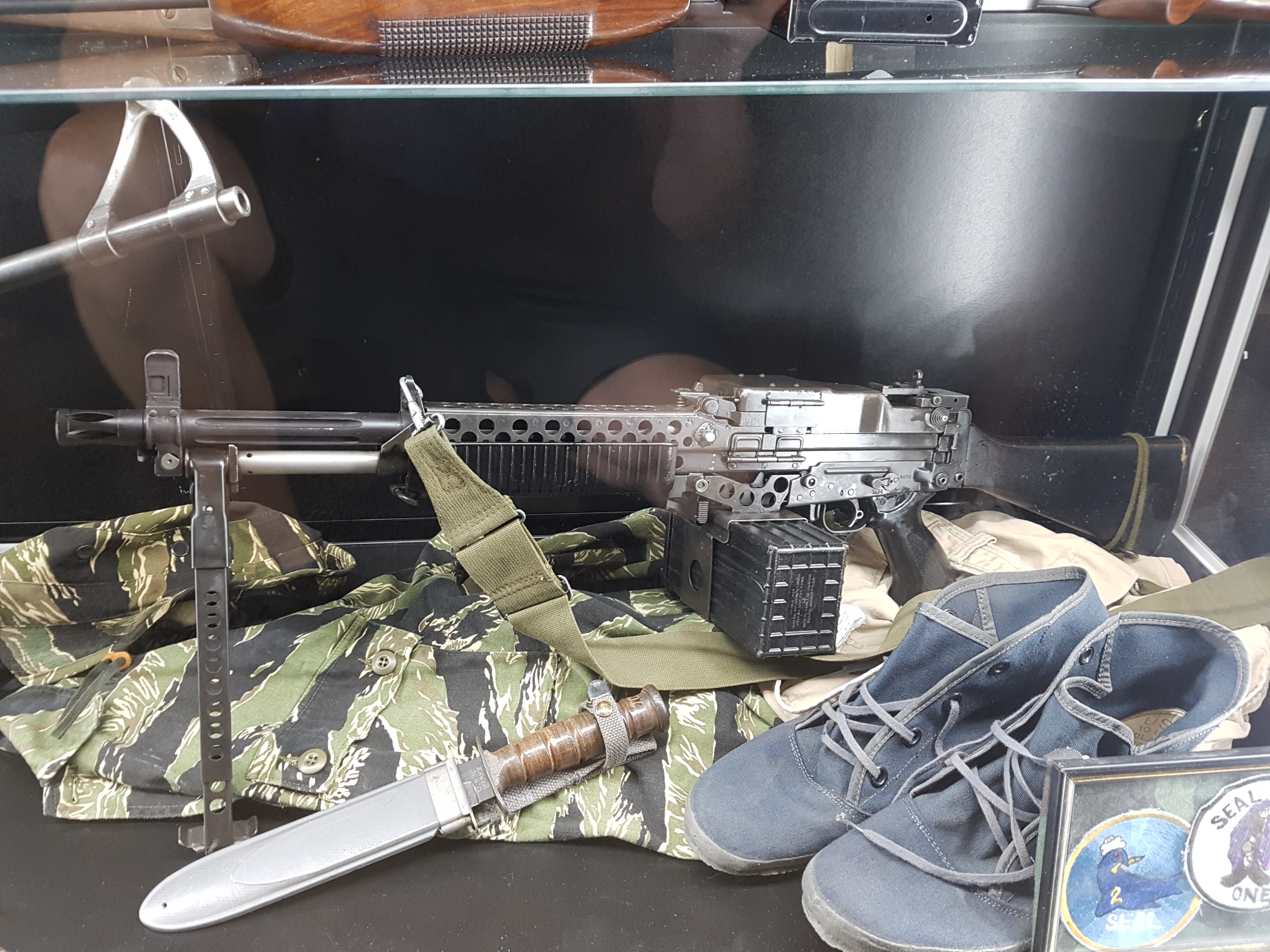
The Stoner 63A Commando lightweight SAW optimized for SEAL teams operating in Vietnam (US service designation XM-207). It features a short, 15.7" fluted barrel to reduce weight and several other minor modifications. Replaced in 1983 by the M249 SAW.

Barrel interchangeability is one of the main features that provides the Stoner 63 rifle its outstanding versatility. There are 5 barrel options available for the system: the Rifle, Carbine, Automatic Rifle (AR) and two types of machine gun barrels, a standard heavy barrel and a short Commando tube. The standard machine gun and AR barrels are 20 in (508.0 mm) in length (not including the flash suppressor). The Commando barrel has a length of 15.7 in (398.8 mm) and is fluted to reduce weight and enhance the barrel's cooling characteristics. This version was sometimes used by the Navy SEALS but was never fully reliable as the gas port is near the muzzle and as soon as the bullet leaves the barrel, gas pressures drop drastically leaving the operating system little to no power reserve. The gas port was drilled larger in an attempt to alleviate this problem; however this had the effect of merely accelerating the piston's initial displacement. The issue was never truly resolved. The Rifle, Carbine and AR barrels have no gas valves as they are exclusively used in magazine-fed configurations and do not require the energy surplus levels of belt-fed mechanisms. The standard machine gun barrel has a manually adjustable gas regulator that can be operated by inserting the nose of a cartridge into a hole over the regulator's lock detent, pushing down on the detent and rotating to the desired position. The gas regulator has three settings: a "slow" cyclic rate of about 700 rounds/min, produced when the narrowest indicator notch is set over the detent; a middle position with an intermediate rate of 830 rounds/min and a third "fouled" position that delivers the largest quantity of propellant gas to the system, resulting in a rate of fire of 865 rounds/min (the use of this setting should be limited as it induces excessive wear on the operating mechanism).

All Stoner 63/63A barrels are gas nitrided and have a quick-detach capability and can be removed in a matter of seconds in field conditions by simply pushing down a latch located on top of the weapon in front of the feed cover and pulling the barrel forward (with the bolt retracted). The chamber portion of the barrel rests on a U-shaped barrel bracket attached to the gas cylinder. The barrel is firmly locked in position by means of a spring-loaded latch (with two nested coil springs) which drives a steel pin into a hole in the barrel socket. All barrels have a gas block to which a bayonet lug and front sight assembly are mounted. The barrels are equipped with a bird cage type flash suppressor with six oval ports. The AR and standard machine gun barrels also have a carrying handle that can be snapped into one of three positions or removed altogether. The black-painted wooden handles are attached to a steel rod via roll pin. With a few exceptions, all the barrels used in the Stoner 63/63A have a six-groove right-hand rifling with a twist rate of 1:12-inch (305 mm), designed to stabilize the lightweight 55-grain M193 projectile, which was standard at the time. At the Army's request, Cadillac Gage submitted for testing rifles, carbines, and light machine guns, with 1:9-inch (230 mm) twist barrels, respectively designated XM22E2, XM23E2, and XM207E2. The different twist was to test the 68-grain XM287 and XM288 bullets. After NWM obtained a license to produce the Stoner 63A, some barrels were manufactured with a 1:8-inch (200 mm) in rifling pitch to be used with heavier experimental bullets. None of these were ever produced in significant numbers.

=== Fire control ===
The Stoner 63/63A LMG is an automatic weapon that fires from the open bolt and the trigger mechanism permits only fully automatic firing. The entire trigger unit has four trigger pins that give the unit its modularity. The front pin holds a flapper-type magazine catch/release (used in the Rifle/Carbine variants and the left-hand feed LMG with a 150-round drum-type belt container), a full dust cover (used with the top-feeding Automatic Rifle or vertically mounted ammo box on any belt-fed system) or a half size dust cover (used with the right-hand-feed bottom box carrier). The next two pins retain the timer and hammer, both of which are absent in the open bolt configurations. The final pin acts as the trigger's axis shaft; the spring-loaded sear pivots on the selector lever's axis pin. The selector is disconnected when firing from the open bolt and a sliding manual safety installed near the trigger guard disables the trigger when pushed to the rear. The rear portion of the trigger housing serves as a receiver end cap and is used to attach the shoulder stock. The black polycarbonate pistol grip is also attached to the trigger housing. The checkered grip is flared at the bottom to prevent the shooter's hand from sliding off and has an internal storage compartment sealed by a hinged cover with a spring-loaded hatch.

=== Features ===
The hooked, non-reciprocating steel charging handle is typically mounted on the right side of the receiver. It has 24 lightening holes and engages a projection on the piston to draw the piston and bolt group to the rear (cocked) position. The handle should then be pushed back forward allowing a flat-spring latch riveted to the front end to capture a slotted plate welded to the front of the receiver. With the right-hand feed mechanism with underslung box carrier installed the handle is awkward to operate, so a special slotted forearm with a bottom cocking handle was developed.

The nucleus of the Stoner 63 system is the receiver which is a rectangular sheet metal pressing. The gas cylinder, support structures, brackets, lugs and other devices are welded in place. The front portion carries the piston and barrel and is perforated to reduce weight and improve air circulation around the barrel and gas cylinder. The rear segment holds the piston extension and bolt group. The ejection port is on the right side when the receiver is inverted and the weapon is configured as a rifle or carbine and on the left side when in the various machine gun roles. The various components are phosphate finished and then coated with a black baked enamel finish called Endurion. Early examples of the Stoner 63 were delivered with all wood furniture, however these were soon replaced with black polycarbonate parts with the exception of the handguard, which remained wood, but was painted black.

The Stoner 63 bipod is a non-locking type that attaches to the gas tube; it does not pivot and has a limited height adjustment feature. The Stoner 63A bipod is extensively perforated with lightening holes and can be locked in either the stowed or deployed positions. It too does not pivot but is compatible with the earlier Stoner 63, whereas the Stoner 63 bipod will not work with the later 63A pattern guns as the gas tube is of a larger diameter.

=== Sights ===
The sight arrangement on the Stoner 63/63A differs amongst the various configurations. On the belt-fed LMGs, the rear sights are mounted on the top cover. These consist of a folding leaf aperture elevation scale graduated in 100 m increments from 200 to 1,000 m. The rear sight can also be corrected for windage in ¼-mil increments. When the primary sight is folded down, a battle sight aperture with a diameter of 0.09 in (2.29 mm) is exposed. The Rifle and Carbine versions have simple flip-type apertures with settings for 0–300 and 300–500 m contained between large perforated protective ears. The sights are adjustable in both windage and elevation in 1 MOA increments. All variants share the same front sight assembly—a semi-shrouded round threaded post adjustable for windage and elevation zero (similar to the M16 front sight).

=== Accessories ===
The Stoner 63/63A is supplied with several accessories, including: a blank-firing attachment (BFA), winter trigger guard, asbestos-lined spare barrel bag, cleaning kit, 40 mm grenade launcher, several types of slings and a wide range of belt box and magazine pouches.

The Stoner 63/63A used three different types of bayonets: the standard U.S. M7, the KCB 70, developed specifically for this rifle by the West German company Eickhorn-Solingen together with NWM and a rare bayonet made by the Swiss industrial conglomerate SIG. The KCB 70 features a 7-inch (180 mm) long Bowie blade with a clip-point and an integrated wire-cutter, it was inspired by Soviet bayonets for the AKM. A highly successful multi-purpose tool, it evolved into the KCB 77, a modular design that was adapted to many different assault rifles.

== Variants ==
The Stoner 63 was produced in several configurations, with 15 separate assemblies, which had limited parts commonality. These variants included a carbine, an assault rifle, and various light machine guns feeding linked ammunition from the left or right. The gas system was mounted in different positions depending on the weapon's configuration. Due to the multi-role nature of the design the carbine and rifle versions were heavier than comparable weapons of the same type.

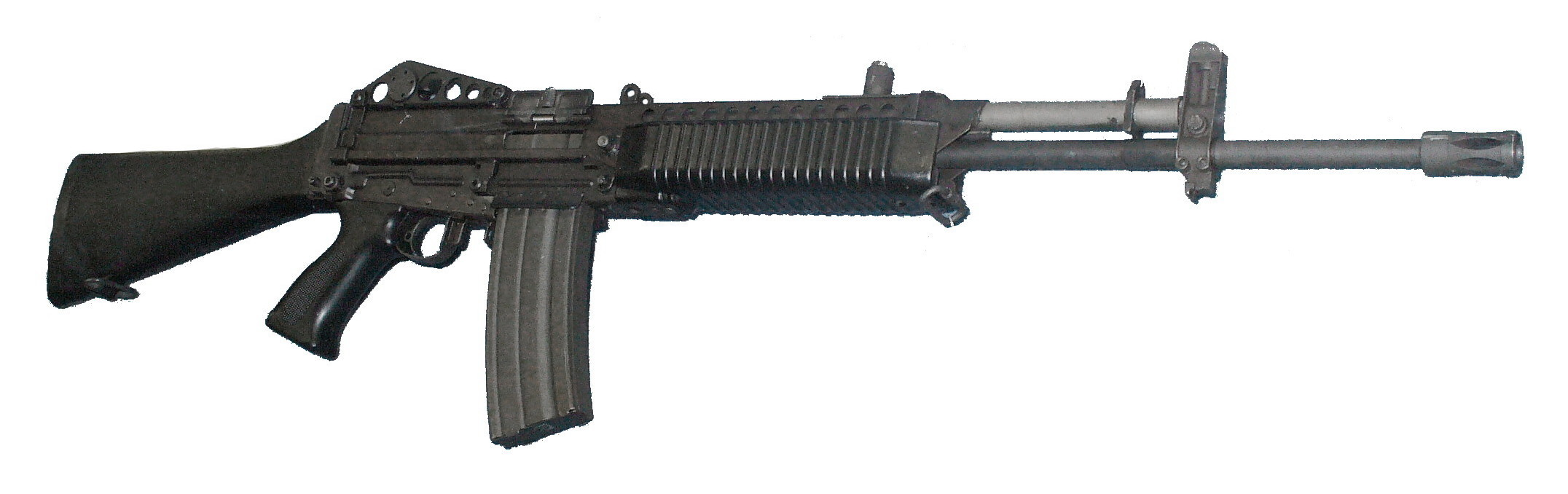
Stoner 63A side-view

- Stoner 63/63A Rifle: A standard assault rifle fed from below by a 30-round box magazine. Spent cases are ejected to the right. The cocking handle and gas system are mounted above the barrel. Unlike the belt-fed configurations, the Rifle fires from closed bolt. The rifle configuration was field tested by the USMC for a short period during April to June 1964 by a recruit company at MCRD Parris Island, SC and elsewhere in 1967. It was eventually fitted with a lightweight bipod that folded beneath the handguard.
- Stoner 63/63A Carbine: The Carbine is similar to the Rifle configuration, but with a shorter barrel and a folding shoulder stock. The carbine configuration was field tested by the USMC for a short period during 1967.
- Stoner 63/63A Automatic Rifle: The Automatic Rifle is an open-bolt rifle fed from a top-mounted, 30-round magazine. The front and rear sights are offset to the left to compensate for the magazine's position. The AR does not have a semi-automatic mode. The automatic rifle configuration was field tested by the USMC for a short period during 1967.
- Stoner 63/63A Light Machine Gun: The LMG configuration fires from an open bolt and is fed from the right-hand side by linked ammunition contained in a 75, 100, 150-round drum magazine. The receiver is identical to the Rifle variants, but is inverted, so that spent cases and links are ejected to the left. The LMG has a quick-change barrel and the gas cylinder is positioned below the barrel since the receiver is inverted. The LMG configuration was adopted for military use by Navy SEAL units operating in Southeast Asia.
- Stoner 63/63A Medium Machine Gun: Identical to the LMG configuration. The difference is that the MMG comes with a separate adapter that can be used to attach the weapon to an M2 or M122 tripod.
- Stoner 63/63A Fixed Machine Gun: Internally identical to the LMG configuration. Externally, the front sights, rear sights, foregrip and pistol grip are all removed. The trigger is activated remotely by a 24V solenoid. The FMG was designed for use with the Cadillac Gage Commando APC, but was never officially adopted.
- Stoner 63/63A Commando: The Commando is a derivative of the LMG configuration. It is fed from the right by a 100-round box magazine and has the charging handle located on the bottom of the handguard for easier access. To save weight, the Commando eschews the quick-change barrel found on the other belt-fed configurations. This variant was used by some United States Navy SEAL units in the Vietnam War.
- Stoner 63 Survival Rifle: The Survival Rifle was designed in 1964 to compete with the Colt Model 608 as an aircrew self-defense weapon. It is mechanically similar to the Rifle configuration, but has several external modifications made to fit into United States Air Force size constraints. These include a cut-down pistol grip, an absent handguard, shortened barrel and receiver, and a top-mounted cocking handle. The Survival Rifle does not incorporate the 63A upgrades. Only one prototype was ever produced—it survives to this day.
- Stoner 66 Civilian Rifle: A short-lived semi-automatic version for the civilian market. Never actually allowed to be sold.
- Stoner 93: A reworked Stoner 63 that was tested in the early 1990s by the Royal Thai Armed Forces using an ACOG scope.

The most recent descendant of this line is the Stoner LMG produced by Knight's Armament Company, which has significant changes from the older Stoner 63, being based on Stoner's later model 86.

Robinson Armament Co. also produced the semi-automatic M96 Expeditionary Weapon System which, though technically different, was based on the Stoner 63 design, and thus has some of its features and configurations.

=== Dutch variants ===
Although none were manufactured in the Netherlands, around 315 were modified and improved by NWM De Kruithoorn N.V. in various configurations for possible use in the Dutch Armed Forces as the Stoner 63A1 consisting of 6 variants One of the main modifications was an MP40 (later AK47) type underfolding and later side folding stock, a carbine, an assault rifle, heavy barrel assault rifle, belt fed machine gun, commando machine gun and fixed machine gun. The Stoner 63A1 was tested by the US Army and USMC as the XM22 assault rifle, XM23 carbine and XM207 machine gun. Various improvements was the Dutch pattern side folding stock, quick release bipod that folded under the handguard, an improved removable magazine floor plate, a quick release scope mount.

== Designations ==
The rifle, carbine, commando, and LMG variants were all given designations by the US Military. They are as follows:

US Army/USMC Designation	US Navy Designation	Description
XM22	N/A	Stoner 63, Rifle configuration, 1:12 twist barrel
XM22E1	N/A	Stoner 63A, Rifle configuration, 1:12 twist barrel
XM22E2	N/A	Stoner 63A, Rifle configuration, 1:9 twist barrel
XM23	N/A	Stoner 63, Carbine configuration, 1:12 twist barrel
XM23E1	N/A	Stoner 63A, Carbine configuration, 1:12 twist barrel
XM23E2	N/A	Stoner 63A, Carbine configuration, 1:9 twist barrel
XM207	N/A	Stoner 63, Light Machine Gun configuration, 1:12 twist barrel
XM207E1	N/A	Stoner 63A, Light Machine Gun configuration, 1:12 twist barrel
XM207E2	N/A	Stoner 63A, Light Machine Gun configuration, 1:9 twist barrel
N/A	Mk 23 MOD 0	Stoner 63A1, Commando configuration, 1:12 twist barrel

== See also ==
- M+G project
- Colt Machine Gun
- Ares Shrike 5.56
- Ingram FBM

== Bibliography ==
- Kokalis, Peter (2001). Weapons Tests And Evaluations: The Best Of Soldier Of Fortune. Boulder, CO: Paladin Press.
- Stoner 63 Weapons System. Boulder, CO: Paladin Press. 1994.
