= Knight's Armament Company LAMG =

Knight's Armament Company Light Assault Machine Gun
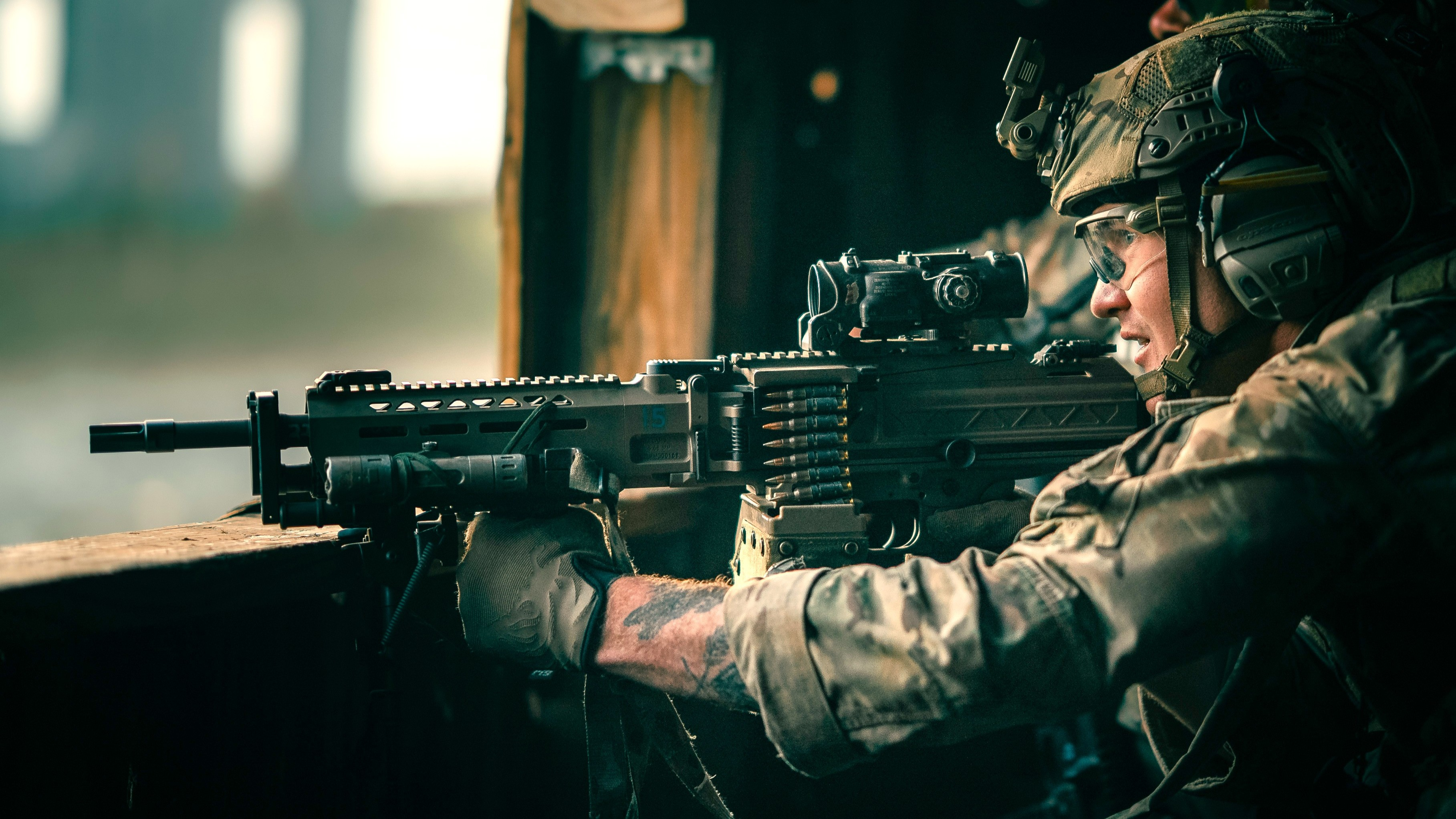
- A U.S. Army 75th Ranger armed with an LAMG having an ELCAN Specter prism sight at the upper receiver's picatinny rail.
- Type: Light machine gun
- Place of origin: United States

Service history
- Used by: See Users

Production history
- Designer: Eugene Stoner
- Designed: 1986
- Manufacturer: Ares Incorporated, Knight's Armament Company
- Produced: 1986–1993, 1996, 2018–present
- Variants: See Variants

Specifications
- Mass: 5.47 kilograms (12.1 lb) (LMG-1); 4.5 kilograms (9.9 lb) (KAC LMG); 5.1 kilograms (11 lb) (LAMG); 6.31 kilograms (13.9 lb) (AMG)
- Length: 895 millimetres (35.2 in); 890 millimetres (35 in) (LAMG); 1,085–1,168 millimetres (42.7–46.0 in) (AMG)
- Barrel length: 381 millimetres (15.0 in) (LAMG); 508 millimetres (20.0 in) (AMG)
- Cartridge: 5.56×45mm NATO (LMG-1, LMG, LAMG); 7.62×51mm NATO (AMG); 6.5 Creedmoor (AMG)
- Barrels: 1:7 Twist, Hammer Forged, Chrome Lined
- Action: Open bolt, Constant Recoil, Gas Operated
- Rate of fire: 550–600 rounds/min (LAMG); 500–525 rounds/min (AMG)
- Feed system: M27 linked disintegrating belt (LAMG)
- Sights: Iron sights and Picatinny rail for various optics

The Knight's Armament Company Light Assault Machine Gun (LAMG) is a light machine gun system developed by Eugene Stoner and manufactured by Knight's Armament Company (KAC). It was previously known as the Knight's Armament Company LMG. It is the current evolution of the Stoner Light Machine Gun concept.

== Development ==
The KAC LAMG's lineage can be traced back to the Stoner 63, which was designed by Eugene Stoner. The Stoner 63 was a lightweight, highly configurable machine gun that saw heavy use by U.S. Special Operations Forces during the Vietnam War. Though it was highly regarded by small specialized units, the Stoner 63 required a lot of maintenance to run properly; therefore, it was never adopted by standard infantry units.

In 1971, Eugene Stoner founded the firearms company ARES Incorporated. In 1986, Stoner and ARES introduced the ARES LMG-1 (AKA Stoner 86). The LMG-1 was Stoner's concept for a Squad Automatic Weapon (SAW). Like the Stoner 63, the LMG-1 was very lightweight, weighing only 12 lb (5.47 kg). It could also accept both an ammunition belt and STANAG magazines. Despite its merits, the LMG-1 was never adopted by a military unit. Instead, the FN Minimi would become the LMG of choice for many militaries around the world, including the M249 SAW in the U.S. military. Eugene Stoner would leave ARES Inc. in 1989.

In 1990, Eugene Stoner re-emerged on the scene with his partnership with Reed Knight Jr. and Knight's Armament Company (KAC). The two made many groundbreaking products, including the SR-25. In 1996, Stoner and Knight's Armament developed the KAC Stoner LMG (AKA Stoner 96). Unlike the Stoner 63 and LMG-1, the Stoner 96 was strictly a belt-fed weapon. The Stoner 96 LMG was extremely lightweight, weighing just under 10 lb (4.5 kg).

Following the death of Eugene Stoner in 1997, Knight's Armament Company decided to further improve upon his design. In 2017, Knight's Armament Company unveiled the KAC LMG/LAMG family of machine guns. The LMG (now named, LAMG) is chambered in 5.56×45mm NATO cartridge and the LAMG (now named, AMG) is chambered in 7.62×51mm NATO. Many features on the platform are unlike that of any other Light Machine Gun currently available. The LAMG and AMG weigh 11.4 lb (5.1 kg) and 13.9 lb (6.3 kg) respectively. In the design, Knight's Armament implemented the constant recoil system that was originally designed for the Ultimax 100. This resulted in the gun being extremely controllable, producing very little felt recoil. Knight's also implemented Magpul furniture for enhanced ergonomics. The LAMG and AMG can also be outfitted with sound suppressors.

Currently, there are few military users of the KAC LAMG/AMG system; however, it is highly regarded within the firearms industry as the latest evolution of the light machine gun. Notably, however, recent photos show the KAC LAMG has been adopted by USASOC in limited quantities, potentially for evaluation purposes.

== Design ==
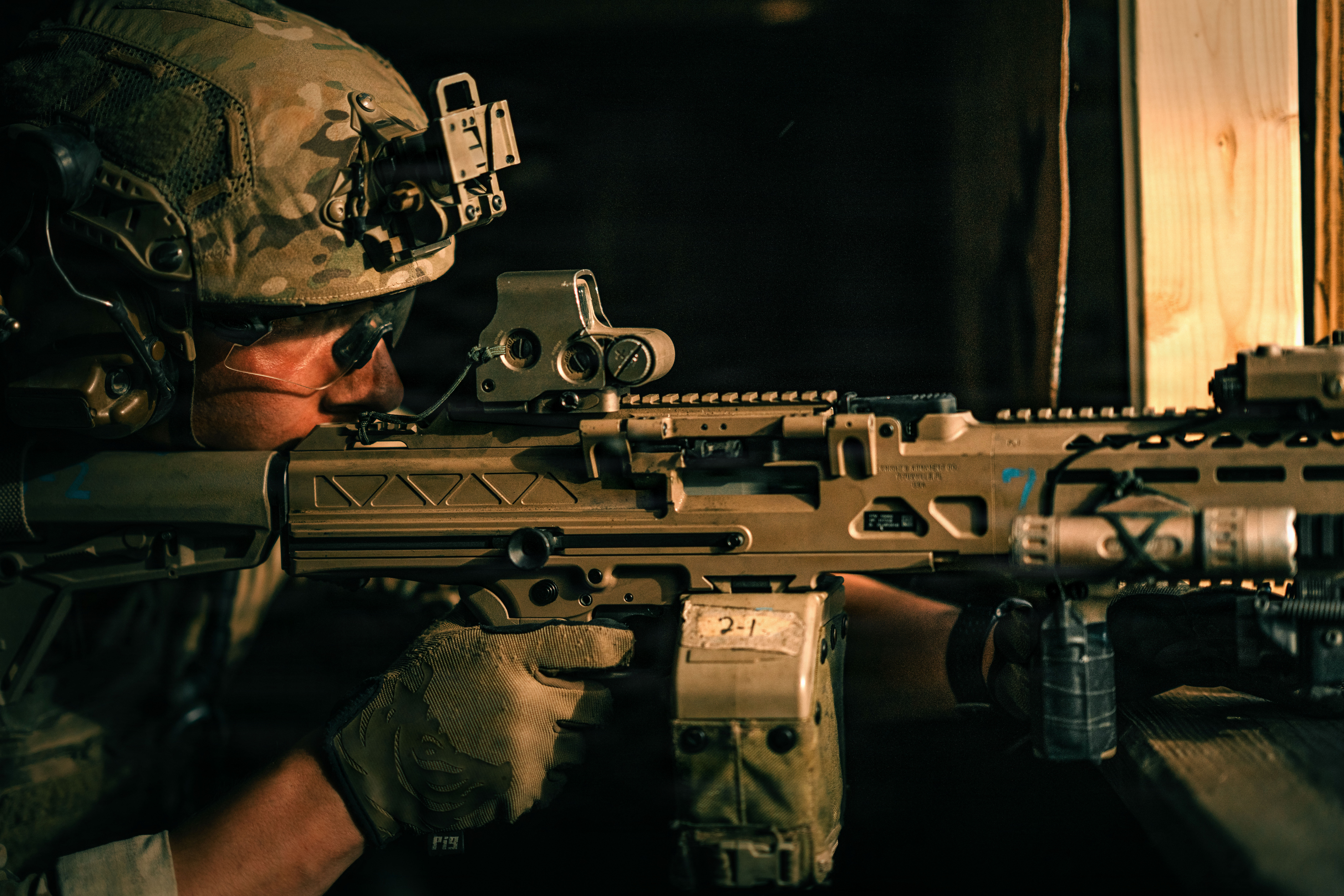
U.S. Army Ranger with 3rd Battalion, 75th Ranger Regiment, firing a KAC LAMG

The LAMG was intended to be lightweight but reliable. It is an open bolt, belt-fed, gas operated, air-cooled light machine gun utilizing the Constant Recoil system found on other machine guns such as Ultimax 100, designed by Stoner 63 contributor Jim Sullivan. In this system the bolt carrier group is fully decelerated by the return spring before hitting the housing to minimize felt recoil and improve controllability. For this reason, the KAC LAMG lacks a bolt buffer.

The belt feed mechanism is a lever-type one, somewhat reminiscent of the vz. 52 and the PK, but with an unusual exposed lever hinged at the side of the receiver swaying horizontally instead of vertically. The top cover above the feed tray is very short to allow for quicker reloading and the mounting a receiver-integral optics rail. The KAC LMG is extremely accurate due to the secure mounting of the “quick change” hammer forged chrome lined barrel.

== Variants ==
=== ARES LMG-1 ===
Introduced in 1986. Developed by Eugene Stoner and manufactured by ARES Inc.. Featured a magazine feed device, M16A2 pistol grip, and fixed tube stock.

=== KAC Stoner LMG ===
Introduced in 1996. Developed by Eugene Stoner and Reed Knight Jr.. Manufactured by Knight's Armament Company (KAC). Simplified derivative of the ARES LMG-1, lacking the magazine feed device. Has shorter barrel and M4 carbine type retractable stock for Close Quarters Battle (CQB) and Picatinny rails for sights/grips/bipods etc.

=== KAC ChainSAW ===
The ChainSAW was originally developed in 2008 as a technical exercise to test new ergonomic designs for light machine guns. The ChainSAW was designed to only be fired from the hip, with a handle along the top to hold the firearm (which is mounted instead of a stock) meaning the user would wield the ChainSAW as if they were using an actual chainsaw. As the ChainSAW is intended to be hip-fired, various targeting aids were developed alongside it to aid the aiming and accuracy, although KAC admits that more work on targeting aids will have to be made before the ChainSAW could be produced and used effectively.

=== KAC LAMG and AMG ===
Introduced in 2017 in both 5.56×45mm NATO and 7.62×51mm NATO. Both versions feature Magpul polymer pistol grips and butt stocks. Both are constructed of mostly aluminum and can be outfitted with Knight's Armament QDC sound suppressors. The AMG variant can be configured to fire 6.5mm Creedmoor as well as .260 Remington, 6.8mm PCP Ammunition polymer case-metal cartridge or .277 True Velocity polymer cased ammo.

== Users ==
- United States: USASOC
