= Eugene Stoner =

American firearms designer (1922–1997)

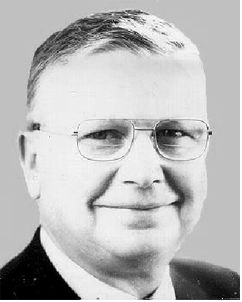
- Mr. Eugene M. Stoner in 1977
- Born: November 22, 1922; Gosport, Indiana, U.S.
- Died: April 24, 1997 (aged 74); Palm City, Florida, U.S.
- Resting place: Quantico National Cemetery
- Engineering career
- Significant design: AR-15 and other small arms

Eugene Morrison Stoner (November 22, 1922 – April 24, 1997) was an American machinist and firearms designer who is most associated with the development of the ArmaLite AR-15 rifle that was redesigned and modified by Colt's Patent Firearm Company for the United States military as the M16A1 rifle.

== Early life ==
Stoner was born in Gosport, Indiana, on November 22, 1922. He moved to Long Beach, California where he graduated from Long Beach Polytechnical High School. In 1939, after the Depression, there was not enough money for him to attend college, so he went to work as a machinist for Vega Aircraft Company, the forerunner of what became Lockheed Airplane Company (now the Lockheed Martin Corporation).

During World War II, he enlisted for Aviation Ordnance in the U.S. Marine Corps and served in the South Pacific and northern China. In the Corps, he had his first experience of working with heavy-caliber automatic weapons as an armourer. The work experience and combat training served him throughout his weapons designing career.

== Engineer ==
In late 1945 Stoner began working in the machine shop for Whittaker, an aircraft equipment company, and ultimately became a Design Engineer.

In 1954 he came to work as chief engineer for ArmaLite, a division of Fairchild Engine & Airplane Corporation. While at ArmaLite, he designed a series of prototype small arms, including the AR-3, AR-9, AR-11, and AR-12, none of which saw significant production. Their only real success during this period was the AR-5 survival rifle, which was adopted by the United States Air Force.

The Stoner bolt and carrier piston system is a widely known gas system designed by Eugene Stoner. The patent for the gas operated bolt and carrier system was filed in 1956 by ArmaLite for use in the AR-10, which was later developed into the ArmaLite AR-15, M16 rifle and M4 carbine. It is commonly called a direct impingement system, but it does not utilize a conventional direct impingement system. In U.S. patent 2,951,424, the designer states: ″This invention is a true expanding gas system instead of the conventional impinging gas system.″ Gas is routed from a port in the barrel through a gas tube, directly to a chamber inside the bolt carrier. The bolt within the bolt carrier is fitted with piston rings to contain the gas. In effect, the bolt and carrier act as a gas piston and cylinder. The subtleties involved in ArmaLite's patent on the gas system significantly diverge from classical direct impingement; upon firing, the pressurized propellant gasses exit the barrel via the gas port and travel the length of the gas tube, but instead of simply applying the inertia necessary to cycle the weapon directly to the bolt carrier, the gas is funneled inside the bolt carrier wherein the increase in pressure results in the bolt itself acting as a piston, forcing the bolt carrier away from the barrel face.

The Stoner bolt and carrier piston system is ammunition specific, since it does not have an adjustable gas port or valve to adjust the weapon to various propellant and projectile or barrel length specific pressure behavior. It provides a very symmetric design that allows straight line movement of the operating components. This allows recoil forces to drive straight to the rear. Instead of connecting or other mechanical parts driving the system, high pressure gas performs this function, reducing the weight of moving parts and the rifle as a whole. The straight-line recoil design, where the recoil spring is located in the stock directly behind the action, and serves the dual function of operating spring and recoil buffer.

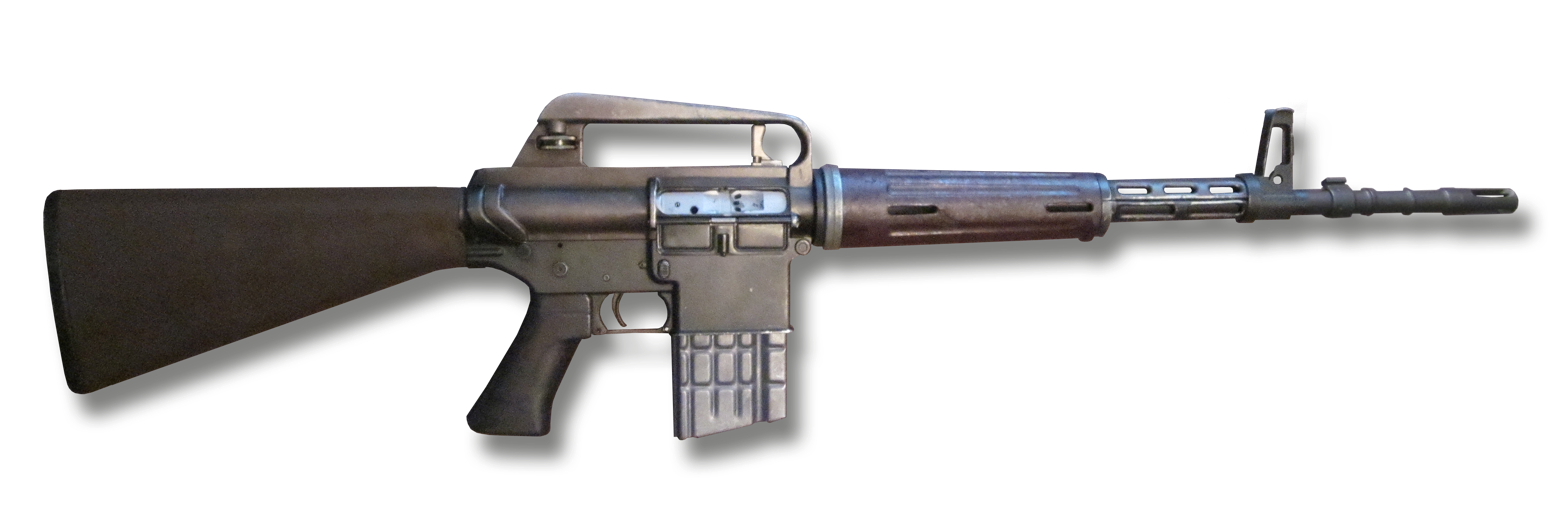
ArmaLite AR-10

In 1955, Stoner completed initial design work on the revolutionary ArmaLite AR-10, a lightweight (3.29 kg (7.25 lb)) select-fire infantry rifle in 7.62×51mm NATO caliber. Besides featuring the Stoner bolt and carrier piston system, the AR-10 stock was in line with the bore to reduce muzzle rise, especially during automatic fire. Because recoil does not significantly shift the point of aim, faster follow-up shots are possible, and user fatigue is reduced. The AR-10 was submitted for rifle evaluation trials to the US Army's Aberdeen Proving Ground late in 1956. In comparison with competing rifle designs previously submitted for evaluation, the AR-10 was smaller, easier to fire in automatic, and much lighter. However, it arrived very late in the testing cycle, and the army rejected the AR-10 in favor of the more conventional T44, which became the M14. The AR-10's design was later licensed to the Dutch firm of Artillerie Inrichtingen, which produced the AR-10 until 1960 for sale to various military forces.

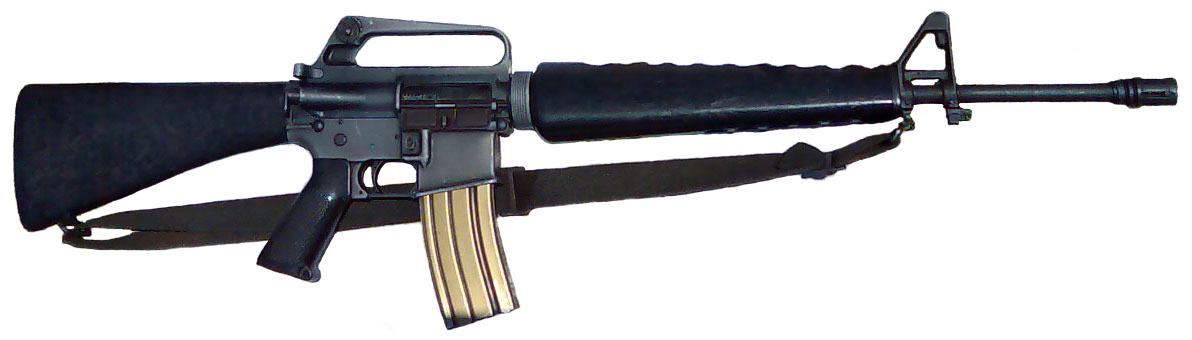
M16A1 rifle

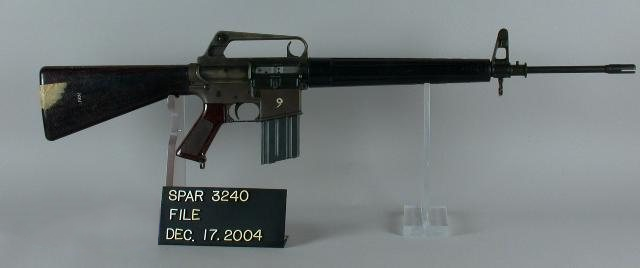
ArmaLite AR-15

At the request of the U.S. military, Stoner's chief assistant, Robert Fremont along with Jim Sullivan designed the Armalite AR-15 from the basic AR-10 model, scaling it down to fire the small-caliber .223 Remington cartridge. The AR-15 was later adopted by United States military forces as the M16 rifle.

After ArmaLite sold the rights to the AR-15 to the Colt Firearms Company, Stoner turned his attention to the AR-16 design. This was another advanced 7.62 mm rifle but used a more conventional short-stroke piston and a number of stamped parts to reduce cost. This weapon saw only prototype development, but adaptation to .223 Remington resulted in the somewhat successful and often imitated Armalite AR-18.

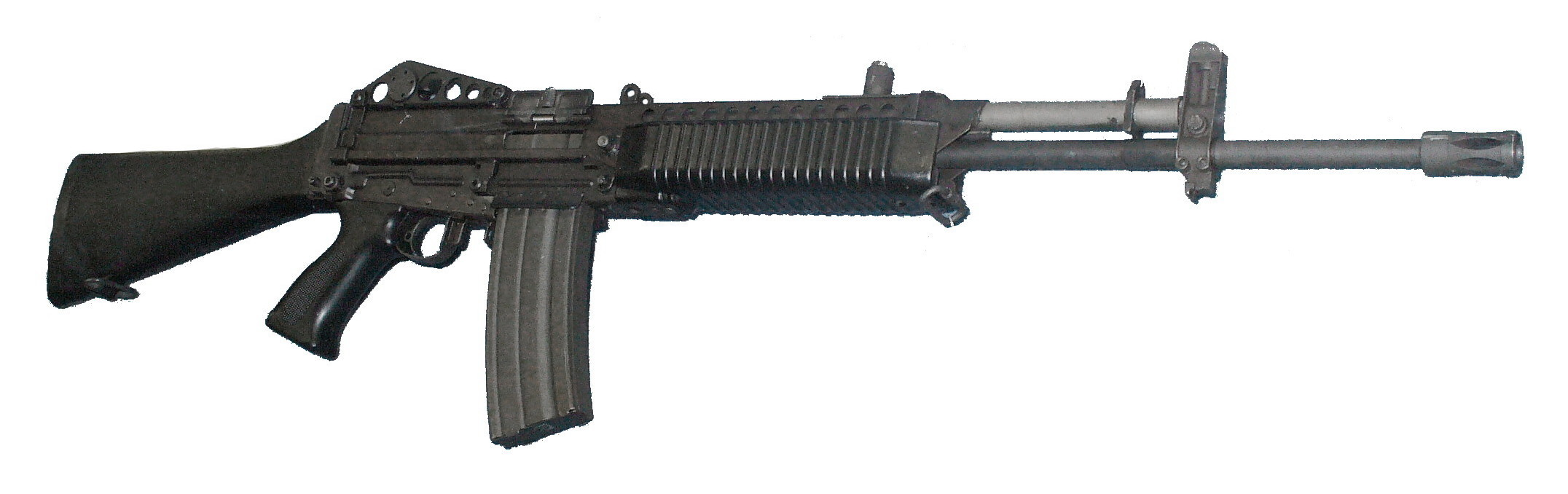
Stoner 63 rifle

Stoner left ArmaLite in 1961 to serve as a consultant for Colt. He eventually accepted a position with Cadillac Gage where he designed the Stoner 63 Weapons System.

This was a modular weapons system which could be reconfigured to be a standard automatic rifle, a light machine gun, a medium machine gun, or a solenoid-fired fixed machine gun.

The Stoner Weapons System used a piston-operated gas impingement system patented as US PAT No. 2,951,424 and granted in September 1960. Once again, Robert Fremont and Jim Sullivan took a Stoner rifle and redesigned it for the .223 Remington cartridge, to create the Stoner 63 Weapons System. Stoner then worked with TRW by designing the TRW 6425 25 mm Bushmaster auto cannon, which was later manufactured by Oerlikon-Bührle as the Oerlikon KBA 25mm.

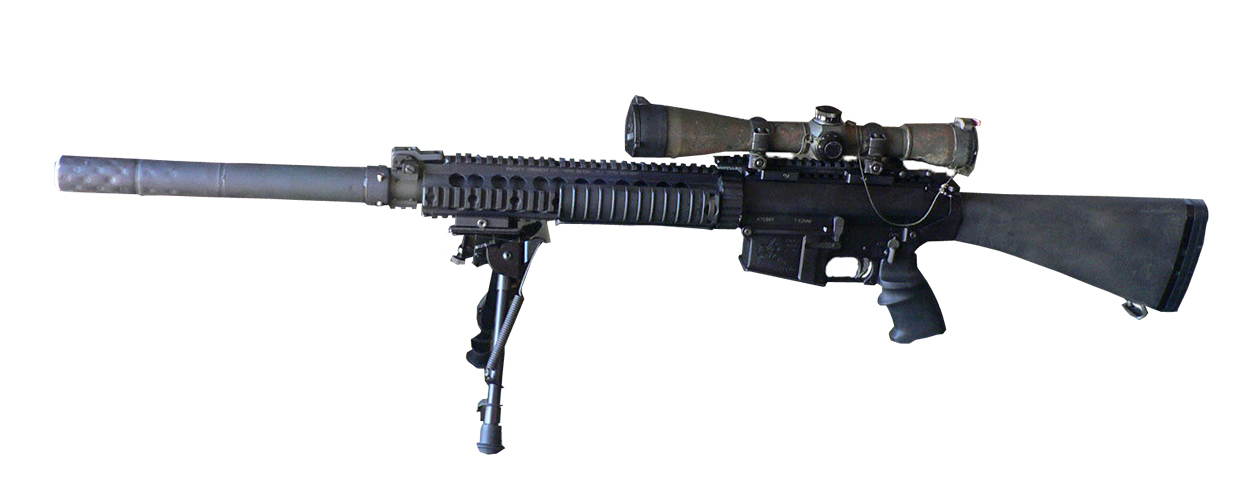
KAC SR-25 rifle

He co-founded ARES Incorporated of Port Clinton, Ohio, in 1972, but left the company in 1989, after designing the Ares Light Machine Gun, sometimes known as the Stoner 86. It was an evolved version of the Stoner 63. At Ares, he also designed the Future Assault Rifle Concept (FARC).

In 1990, he joined Knight's Armament Company (KAC) to create the Stoner Rifle-25 (SR-25), which currently sees military service as the United States Navy Mark 11 Mod 0 Sniper Weapon System. While at KAC, he also worked on yet another version of the Stoner Weapons System, called the Stoner 96. Among his last designs were the SR-50 rifle and the Colt 2000.

== Meeting with Kalashnikov ==
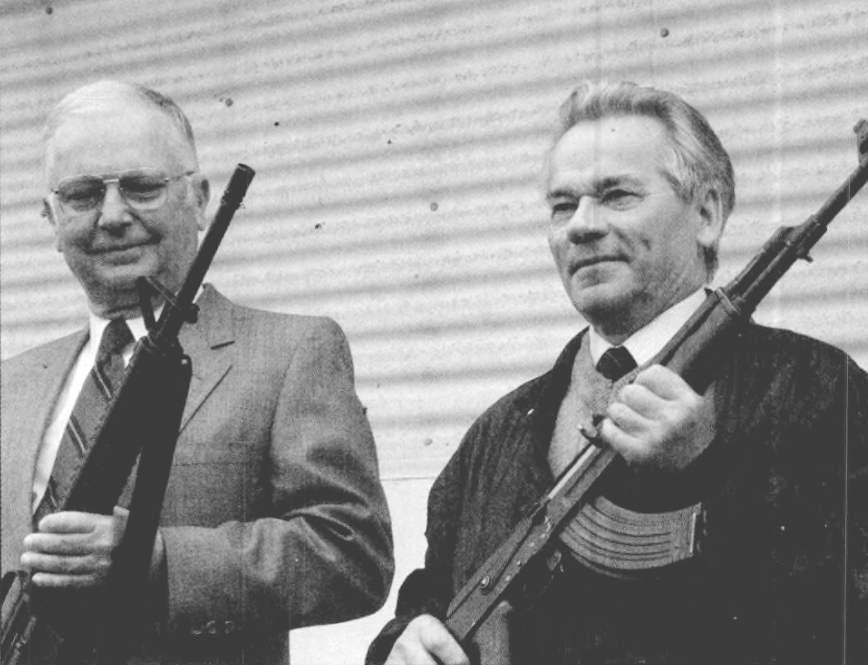
Stoner (left) and Kalashnikov hold the rifles they designed, May 22, 1990.

On May 16, 1990, Stoner and Mikhail Kalashnikov, inventor of the AK-47 and its derivatives, met for the first time. They spent the next few days talking, sharing stories, shopping, going out to dinner and touring Washington D.C. They visited the Smithsonian Institution, the NRA's National Firearms Museum, and a hunting lodge owned by the gun club at Star Tannery, where they went shooting. They also visited the Marine Corps base in Quantico, Virginia, where they watched new weapons being tested. During this short visit, both men, intimately familiar with the other's work, shared a common bond and became friends, "not needing an interpreter to get their thoughts across."

== Death ==
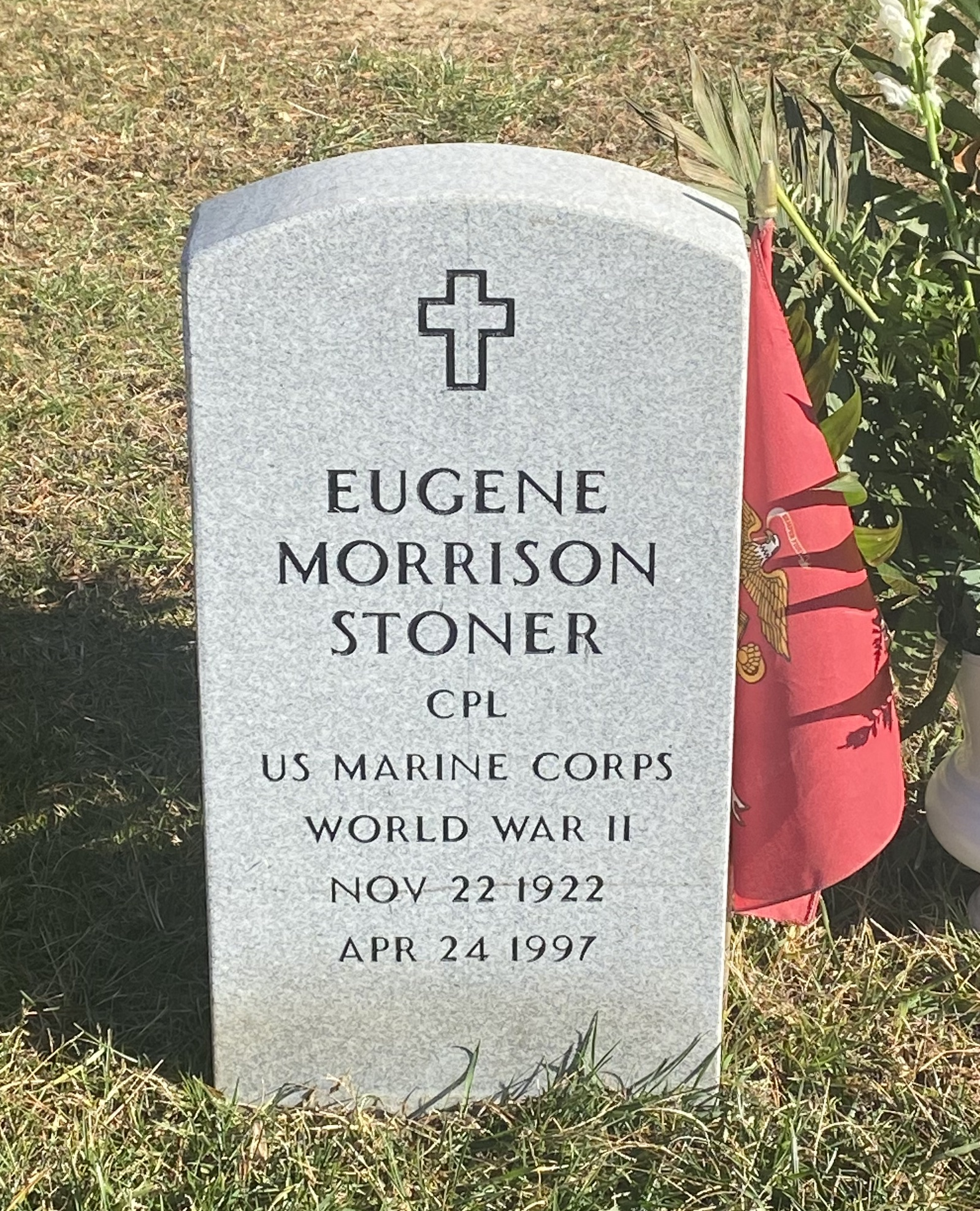
Eugene M. Stoner's grave marker at Quantico National Cemetery, Quantico, Virginia.

Eugene Stoner died of cancer at the age of 74 on April 24, 1997, and was interred in the Quantico National Cemetery, Quantico, Virginia.

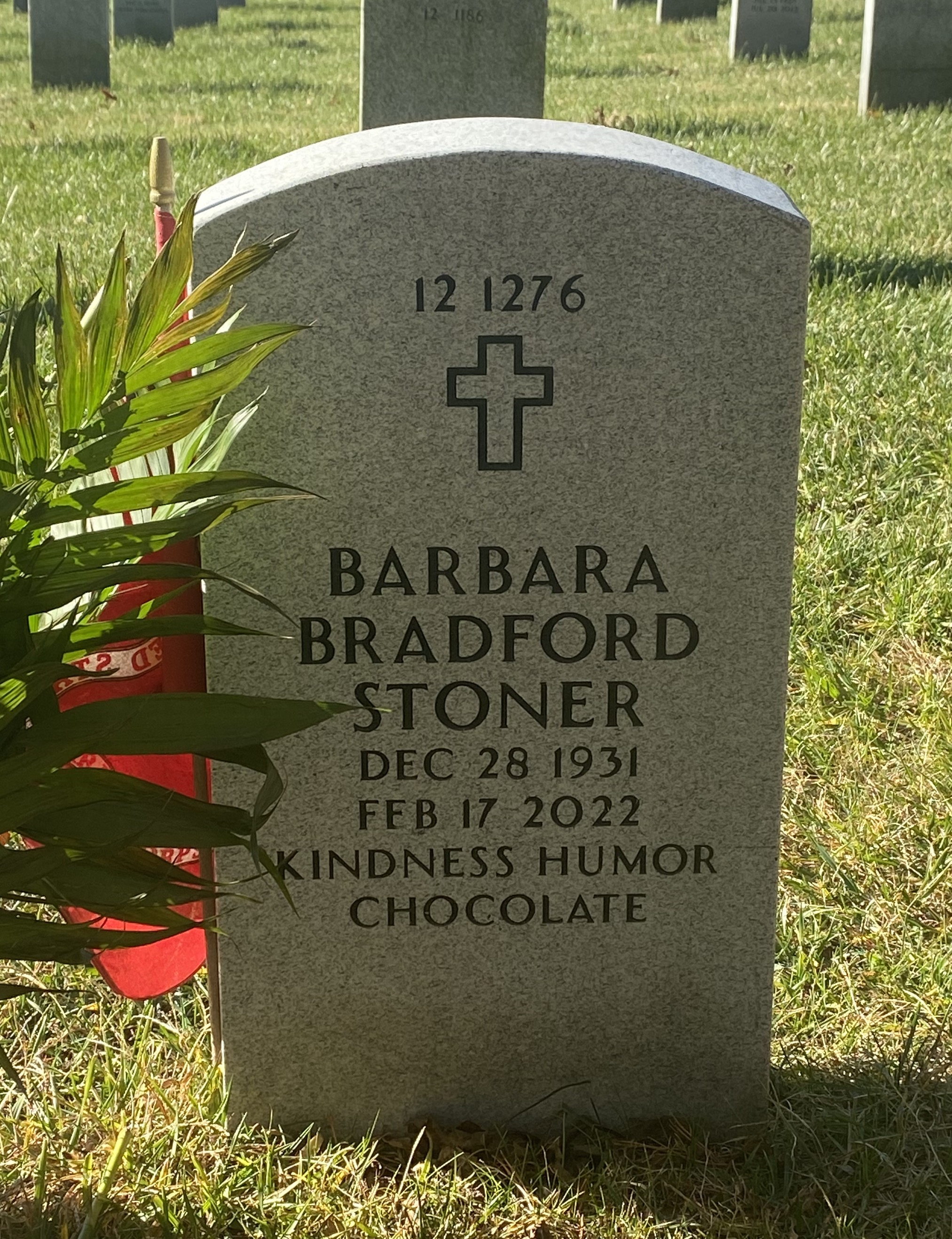
Back of Eugene M. Stoner's grave marker at Quantico National Cemetery, Quantico, Virginia.

He was survived by his wife, Barbara Hitt Stoner, whom he married in 1965; his first wife, Jean Stoner Mahony of Newport Beach, California, from whom he was divorced in 1962; four children from his first marriage, seven grandchildren and four great-grandchildren. Barbara Hitt Stoner died at her home in Plymouth, Michigan on February 17, 2022, and was interred with her husband.

== Weapon designs ==
=== Armalite designs ===
- AR-3
- AR-5
- AR-7
- AR-9
- AR-10
- AR-11
- AR-12
- AR-14
- AR-15
- M16 rifle
- AR-16
- AR-17
- AR-18
- AR-50

=== Other designs ===
- Stoner 62 / Stoner 63
- Oerlikon KBA 25 mm Autocannon (evolution of TRW 6425)
- ARES FMG (Folding Machine Gun)
- Ares Light Machine Gun (A.K.A. the "Stoner 86/96")
- Advanced Individual Weapon System (AIWS)
- Future Assault Rifle Concept (FARC)
- SR-25 (U.S. Navy Mark 11 Mod 0 Sniper Rifle)
- SR-15
- Mk 12 Special Purpose Rifle
- SR-50
- XM274 (tested on HSTV-L, HIMAG, RDF/LT and ELKE)
