= URX =

The three letters URX may refer to:

- British Rail used the acronym "URX" to refer to an Under Road Crossing, and it still appears as such on maps
- Knight's Armament Company's Universal Rail eXtension - an adapter system for adding components to firearms
- "URX" is the stock ticker symbol for United Refining Energy Corp., listed on NYSE MKT (formerly AMEX - American Stock Exchange)
- The Picatinny rail, an adapter system similar to KAC's Universal Rail eXtension, is also (incorrectly) referred to as "URX"
