= M96 =

M96 or M-96 may refer to:

- M96 (New York City bus), a New York City bus route in Manhattan
- Messier 96, an intermediate spiral galaxy about 31 million light-years away in the constellation Leo
- M-96 (Michigan highway), a state highway in Michigan
- M96 motorway, a mock motorway at the Fire Service College in England
- Robinson Armament M96 Expeditionary, a semi-automatic rifle chambered for the 5.56×45mm NATO round
- A Porsche flat-six engine
