= KS-1 rifle =

KS Carbine
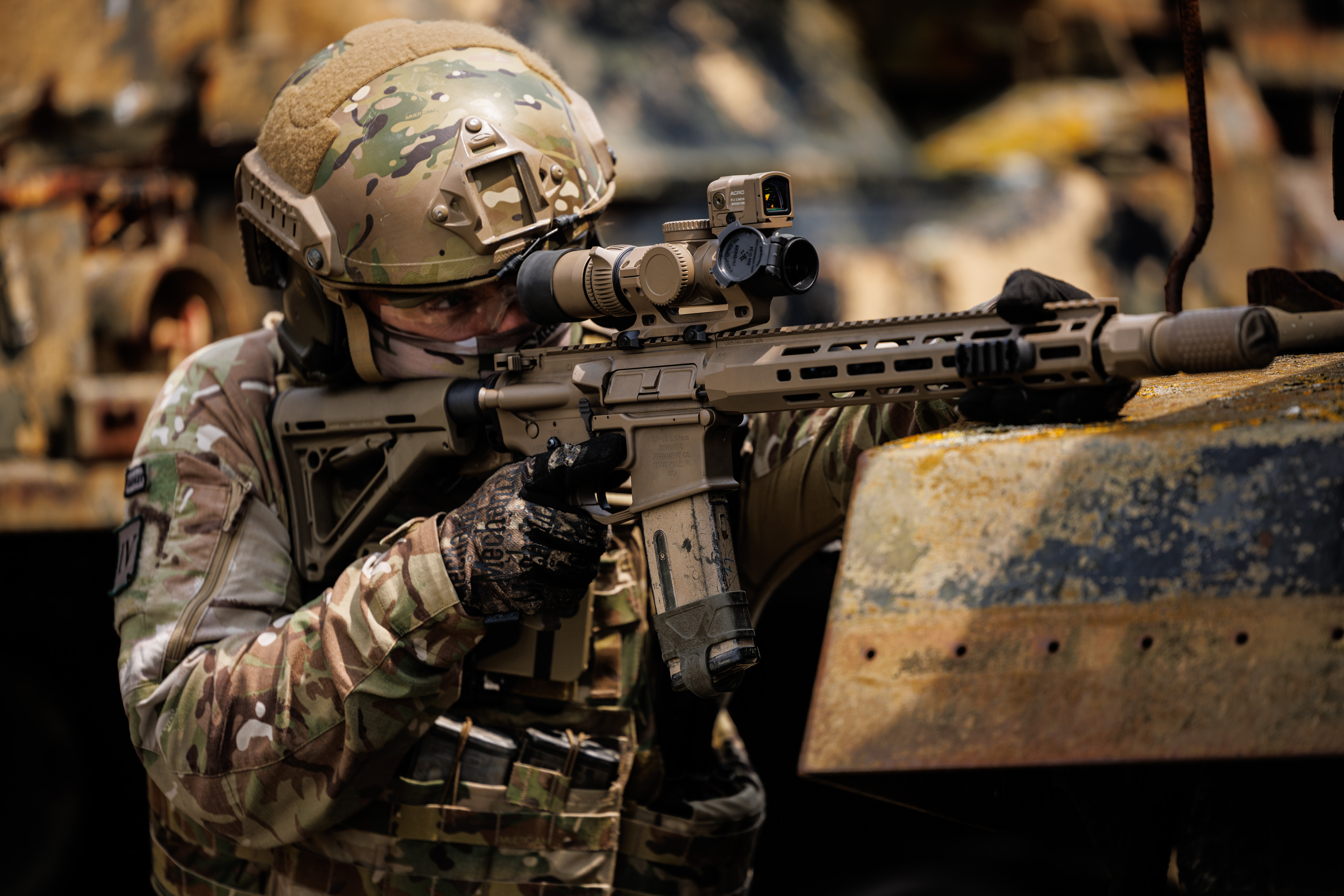
- British Ranger Regiment soldier with KS-1 (L403A1)
- Type: Assault rifle
- Place of origin: United States

Service history
- In service: 2023–present
- Used by: British Armed Forces; Republic of Korea Armed Forces

Production history
- Designed: 2022
- Manufacturer: Knight's Armament Company
- Produced: 2022–present

Specifications
- Mass: 3.12 kg (6.9 lb)
- Length: 818–869 mm (32.2–34.2 in)
- Barrel length: 292.1 mm (11.5 in), 347.98 mm (13.7 in), 368.3 mm (14.5 in), 406.4 mm (16.0 in)
- Cartridge: 5.56×45mm NATO
- Action: Gas-operated, closed rotating bolt, Stoner bolt and carrier piston
- Feed system: STANAG magazine
- Sights: Folding Back-Up Iron Sights

The KS series of rifles are produced by Knight's Armament Company (KAC). They are designed as updated versions of their AR-based SR-15 rifles. The 13.7" KS-1 variant was adopted as the L403A1-AIW by the British Armed Forces in 2023 to supplement the L85A2-A3 and L119A1-A2 rifles used by Royal Marines and the British Army Ranger Regiment.

== History ==
The KS family of rifles was unveiled at military small arms conventions in 2022 as being developed for an international special operations forces (SOF) requirement. In September 2023, the British Armed Forces selected the KS-1 rifle under Project Hunter to replace the L85A2-A3 and L119A1-A2 rifles used by the British Army Special Operations Brigade and elements of the Royal Marines including strike companies and the Surveillance and Reconnaissance Squadron.

The KS-1 has been given the designation L403A1 and is known as the Alternative Individual Weapon (AIW) system. The Royal Marines have purchased more than a thousand KS-1 rifles and the British Army has purchased 1,620 KS-1 rifles worth £15 million. Knights Armament's submission (KS-1) was selected over other notable competitors including Heckler & Koch, SIG Sauer, Daniel Defense, and Glock. The UK Ministry of Defence (MoD) contract includes a £90 million option to purchase up to 10,000 rifles over the next decade. KAC is working with Edgar Brothers to distribute the weapon in the UK.

In February 2025, the Royal Marines reportedly tested the KS-1 in Norway for use in cold weather operations.

== Design ==
The KS series features a self-indexing, highly-efficient gas system with a straight gas tube design. The fit of the gas system minimizes gas pressure loss between the gas block and carrier key. The gas block notably is held in place with a nut which simplifies removal and maintenance.

The KS rifles feature an enhanced bolt carrier group with Knights Armament's E3.2 Enhanced Bolt. It is a proprietary bolt which features an enlarged bolt face, dual ejectors, rounded bolt lugs, reduced diameter cam pin, and proprietary extractor and firing pin designs. These features increase the firearm's durability and reliability.

Unlike most AR-style rifles, the lower receiver of the KS is fully-ambidextrous. The fire control safety, magazine release, and bolt catch/release are mirrored on both sides of the rifle.

The KS rifles feature Knights Armament's Quick Detach Coupling (QDC) flash hiders and a drop-in two-stage match trigger. All current KS rifles feature cold hammer forged barrels which are chrome-lined. In addition, it utilizes Knight's Armament's proprietary free-floating handguard, the URX 6, which covers the entire length of the barrel and helps to protect the barrel from damage. The current series of KS rifles is chambered in 5.56×45mm NATO and comes in four barrel length configurations (11.5", 13.7", 14.5", 16").

== Variants ==
=== KS-1 ===
13.7" heavy-profile barrel with mid-length gas system. The barrel features distinctive ball-mill dimpling for weight-relief and reduction of heat-induced barrel shift. When paired with a small high-efficiency suppressor, the KS-1 notably has a similar overall length to a 10.3" M4 carbine with a full-sized suppressor, but with higher muzzle velocity.

==== L403A1 ====
British military designation for the KS-1 model. Equipped with L900A1 Optics Suite (Vortex 1–10x low power variable optic in a Reptilia AUS mount, combined with an Aimpoint ACRO P-2 red dot sight in a Reptilia ROF 90 mount) and KAC QDC/MCQ-PRT Inconel 3D printed reduced backpressure suppressor.

=== KS-2 ===
14.5" barrel with mid-length gas system.

=== KS-3 ===
11.5" barrel with carbine-length gas system. Its smaller size allows for easier stowing for transport, and less cumbersome to carry. With nearly 100% compatibility with other KS series rifles, it is the recommended choice for a secondary upper receiver for those with KS-1 or KS-2 rifles, or as a primary system for those that require a dependable, small, lighter carbine.

=== KS-4 ===
16" barrel with "extended" mid-length gas system that utilizes a 15" variant of the URX handguard.

== Users ==
- South Korea: An unknown number of KS-3s are used by the Korea Coast Guard and the 707th Special Mission Group.
- United Kingdom: Designated the L403A1. They are currently in use with the Royal Marines and the British Army Ranger Regiment as a replacement for the SA80.
