= Ingram FBM =

Fusil Automatico FBM
- Type: Assault rifle
- Place of origin: Bolivia

Production history
- Designed: 1990s
- Manufacturer: Fabrica Boliviana de Municiones

Specifications
- Cartridge: 5.56×45mm NATO; 7.62×39mm
- Caliber: 5.56mm 7.62mm
- Action: Gas-operated, rotating bolt
- Feed system: 30-round detachable STANAG magazine

The FBM assault rifle (Fusil Automatico FBM) is an assault rifle manufactured by FBM of Bolivia. The weapon was designed around the IMI Galil and the Stoner 63. The FBM was designed by Gordon Ingram and manufactured by Fabrica Boliviana de Municiones in the 1990s. It was designed for ease of cost/manufacture and with limited equipment such as lathes/mills etc. Although the design uses various combat proven design components, it is not known if the weapon was manufactured and if any more info is available.

== Design ==
The FBM assault rifle uses designs from the IMI Galil and the Stoner 63. It uses 5.56×45mm NATO (Galil/STANAG magazines) and 7.62×39mm M43 rounds (AK47 magazines) and exists in Rifle/Carbine/SMG layouts. Components are made from 4130 and 8620 chrome molybdenum heat treated alloy steel for durability. The bolt is enclosed in a one piece receiver attached to an inline barrel to the bore with the cocking handle at the rear to resist overheating. Weapon when fired using a roller hammer. Field stripping of the bolt is at the rear of the upper receiver allowing the secure low profile use of sights etc. low mounted on the receiver. The FBM also uses a fixed stock as well as FN/Galil side folding stock, bipod, bayonet, grenade launchers and electrical fire controls. Designed for ease of manufacture in facilities with limited equipment/resources, the basic structural components/lockwork are pressed sheet stampings with simplified outlines and contours for in house modular design. However, only the bolt and gas components are manufactured on lathes/mills.

The fire control group of the FBM has 3 positions: Forward position allows full auto, Middle allows semi auto, Rear allows safety. When field stripping, press down rear tab of the recoil spring guide at the rear of the upper receiver and hinge open forward (holding rear tab of the recoil spring guide). This would allow the recoil spring guide and bolt group to be removed from the upper receiver.

== See also ==
- List of assault rifles
