= Robinson Armament XCR =

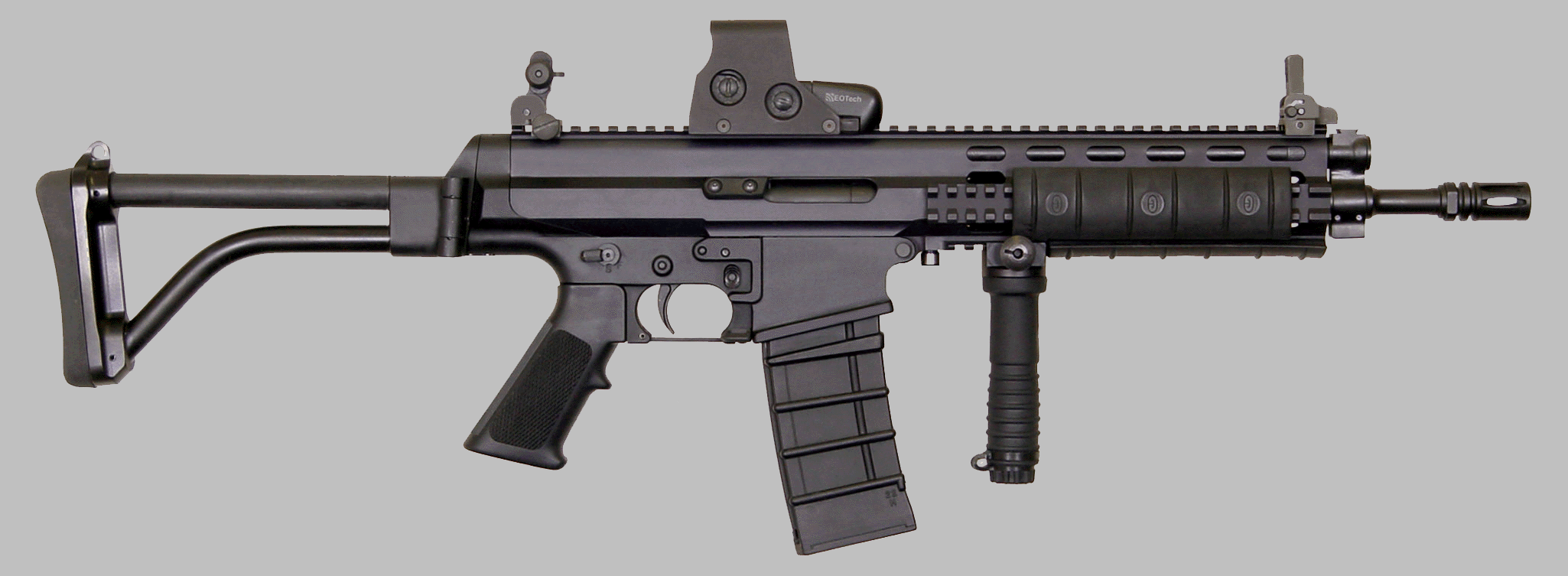
- XCR-L"CQB"
- Type: Assault rifle (XCR-L Series); Battle rifle (XCR-M Series)
- Place of origin: United States

Service history
- Wars: Russo-Ukrainian War

Production history
- Designer: Alex J. Robinson
- Designed: 2004
- Manufacturer: Robinson Armament Co.
- Produced: 2006–present
- Variants: XCR-L, XCR-PDW, XCR-M, XCR-Micro

Specifications
- Mass: XCR-L Standard (empty): 3.4 kg (7.5 lbs); XCR-L Mini (empty): 2.8 kg (6.2 lb); XCR-L Micro (empty): 2.4 kg (5.3 lb); XCR-L Pistol (empty): 2.35 kg (5.2 lb); XCR-M Standard (empty): 4.19 kg (9.2 lb); XCR-M Mini (empty): 3.719 kg (8.20 lb)
- Length: XCR-L Standard: 939.8 mm (37") / (Folded): 698.5 mm (27.5"); XCR-L Mini: 685.8 mm (27") / (Folded): 508 mm (20"); XCR-L Micro: 609.6 mm (24") / (Folded): 457.2 mm (18"); XCR-L Pistol: 457.2 mm (18") / (Folded): (No stock); XCR-M Standard: 939.8 mm (37") / (Folded): 762 mm (30"); XCR-M Mini: 863.6 mm (34") / (Folded): 711.2 mm (28")
- Barrel length: XCR-L Standard: 279.4 mm (11"); 304.8 mm (12"); 373.38 mm (14.7"); 388.62 mm (15.3"); 406.4 mm (16"); 472.44 mm (18.6"); XCR-L Mini: 254 mm (10"); XCR-L Micro: 190.5 mm (7.5"); XCR-L Pistol: 190.5 mm (7.5"); XCR-M Standard: 406.4 mm (16"); 472.44 mm (18.6"); XCR-M Mini: 330.2 mm (13"); 373.38 mm (14.7"); 406.4 mm (16")
- Caliber: XCR-L: 5.56×45mm NATO; .300 Blackout; 7.62×39mm; 5.45×39mm; 6.8mm Remington SPC; 6.5mm Grendel; 6mm ARC; .224 Valkyrie; XCR-M: 7.62×51mm NATO; .260 Remington; 6.5mm Creedmoor; .243 Winchester
- Action: Gas-operated long-stroke piston, rotating bolt
- Rate of fire: 700–900 rounds/min
- Muzzle velocity: 792–990 m/s (2600–3250 ft/s)
- Effective firing range: 300–600 m (330–660 yd), depending on configuration
- Feed system: 30-round detachable box (5.56 variant) magazine, staggered-column magazine (STANAG compatible), 20-round detachable box magazine (7.62mm and .260 Remington variants)
- Sights: Picatinny rail

The Robinson Armament XCR is a multi-caliber, gas piston weapon system developed by Robinson Armament Co. for U.S. Special Operations Command (SOCOM) to fill the requirements of the SOF Combat Assault Rifle, or SCAR competition, but was disqualified due to the manufacturer failing to provide blank firing adapters on time. It has been offered to law enforcement, the military, and the general public since 2006.

== History ==
The XCR was designed in 2004 by Alex J. Robinson of Robinson Armament Co., with production of the XCR-L variant of the rifle beginning in mid-2006.

One month after the September 11 attacks, Alex Robinson received an invitation from the 5th Special Forces Group to participate in a program to provide a design for the SPRV (Special Purpose Rifle Variant), with the requirement of being able to use common enemy ammunition types such as the 7.62×39 and 5.45×39 cartridges, in addition to .223 Remington. A full-auto variant of the M96 was built within 60 days, with the gun then sent to Blackwater for trials, where it was received positively.

Following submission by Steve Holland from 5th Special Forces Group, alongside Colonel Jack Dills, to the United States Special Operations Command for approval, the SCAR program commenced, with the XCR eventually becoming one of many designs brought forward by a number of participating manufacturers.

== Design ==
The XCR utilizes a heavy duty bolt and extractor connected to a long stroke type gas piston. The bolt and extractor are designed and patented by Robinson Arms, and promoted as offering higher performance over eight lug M16/M4 type bolts.

Other features include a folding stock, telescoping M4 Carbine style stocks, monolithic top Picatinny rail with side and under-barrel rails, and forward assist integrated into left-side charging handle.

=== Variants ===
The XCR-L is currently available in 5.56×45mm NATO, 300 Blackout, 6.8mm Remington SPC, 6.5mm Grendel, 5.45×39mm, .224 Valkyrie, 6mm ARC, .22 ARC, .338 ARC and 7.62×39mm calibers. Each of these calibers is available in kit form for converting an existing rifle to one of the other calibers.

The XCR-M .308 was officially confirmed via Robinson Arms email circulation to a public reveal at SHOT show 2011. The 6.8mm Remington SPC variant began shipping in November 2007.

The 7.62×39mm rifles and conversion kits began shipping in July 2008.

In August 2009, Robinson Arms began shipping 3 different sized upper receivers enabling PDW and pistol style variants:

- Standard Upper Receiver – The original length and designed to support barrel lengths from 11" to 18.6".
- Mini Upper Receivers – 15.25" long and designed to support barrel lengths from 9" to 18.6". Primarily intended for barrel lengths from 9" to 10".
- Micro Upper Receivers – 13.25" long and designed to support barrel lengths from 7.5" to 18.6". Primarily intended for barrel lengths from 7.5" to 8".

Variants are also available in "California" versions which are limited to meet the more restrictive State of California firearms laws.

Robinson Armament also produced an 18.6" barrel version for the Canadian market. The XCR rifles intended for the Canadian market were shipped with the FAST stock (fully adjustable stock), although aftermarket stocks are available as an accessory. These rifles shipped with a single magazine pinned to accept only five rounds. On May 1, 2020, the XCR was reclassified as a Prohibited Firearm and is no longer legal to import or sell in Canada.

Since its introduction in 2006, components of the XCR have been updated. Most of these enhancements are available to existing XCR owners.

- In November 2006 the firing pin was redesigned and made more durable and robust.
- The first few hundred XCRs shipped with Yankee Hill Machine (YHM) back up iron sights (BUIS). The most recent iteration ships either without BUIS or with BUIS designed by Midwest Industries.
- A 2nd generation adjustable gas system started shipping with XCR rifles in July 2007. The 1st generation gas system required tools (a 5/8" wrench) to adjust. The 2nd generation system can be adjusted by hand.
- The XCR's hammer was updated in July 2008 concurrent with the release of the 7.62×39 rifles/kits. The new heavier design allows the XCR to ignite some newer Wolf 7.62×39 ammunition made with extra-hard primers.
- In early 2009, Robinson began shipping rifles with an integral winter-style trigger guard and new paddle style safety. A provision for a quick detachable sling loop was added to the stock mount.
- A two-stage match trigger is available which will break at approximately 3.5 lbs. This trigger can be ordered with a new rifle or retrofitted to an older one. The older one was a two-stage trigger that was about twice as heavy, and some complaints included trigger slap. As of May 2009, the new trigger has been shipping with all new rifles.
- Ambidextrous mag release was demonstrated at SHOT 2010.
- XCR-M .308 and XCR-L 5.45 calibers have been confirmed for public announcement and display at SHOT show 2011 via Robinson e-mail bulletin.

=== Operating mechanism ===
The XCR rifle utilizes a gas-operated action with a long-stroke gas piston, similar to the Kalashnikov design, and the gas chamber is positioned above the barrel.

Its proprietary bolt features a three-lug design, securely locking onto the barrel extension, which helps to keep the upper receiver unstressed. The design eliminates the need to check headspace when changing barrels. The rifle incorporates a steel fixed ejector inside the receiver, secured by two bolts, which the manufacturer claims results in stronger ejection compared to the AR-15's spring-loaded ejector. Ejection pattern occurs at the two o'clock position relative to the operator, with an optimal distance of 15 to 20 feet, depending on the ammunition type and gas setting.

=== Magazines ===
The XCR uses STANAG 4179 type magazines.

== Operators ==
- Ukraine

== See also ==
- Robinson Armaments M96 Expeditionary
