= SR-25 =

Semi-automatic rifle designed by Eugene Stoner

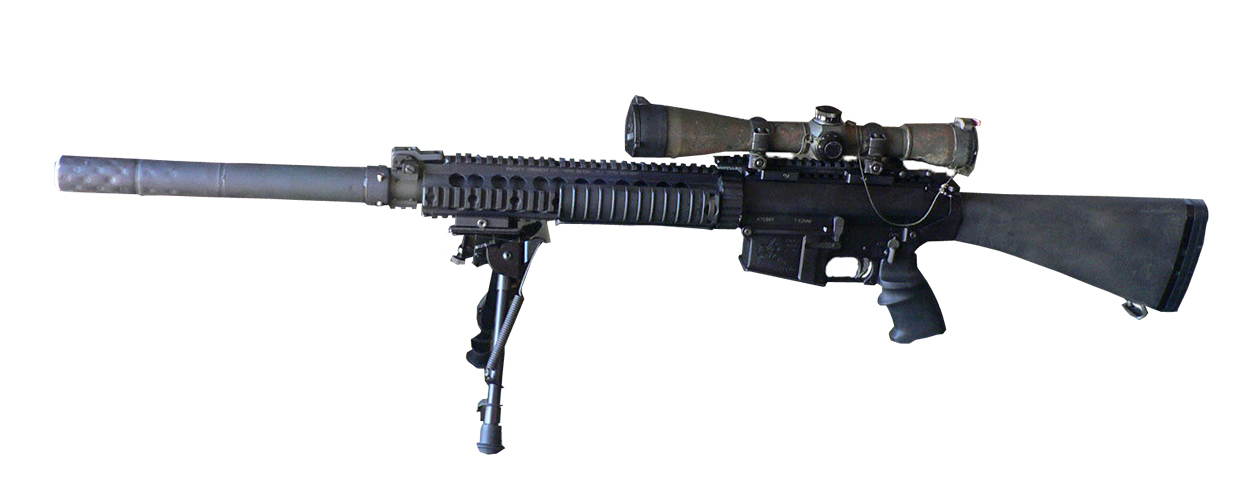
- An SR-25 outfitted with a riflescope, bipod and a detachable suppressor
- Type: Designated marksman rifle Semi-automatic sniper rifle
- Place of origin: United States

Service history
- In service: 1990–present
- Used by: See Users
- Wars: Second Intifada; War in Afghanistan (2001–2021); Operation Enduring Freedom - Philippines; Iraq War; 2006 East Timorese crisis; Zamboanga City crisis; Battle of Marawi

Production history
- Designer: Eugene Stoner
- Manufacturer: Knight's Armament Company
- Variants: SR-25 Enhanced Match rifle, with 20 in (510 mm) barrel; SR-25 Enhanced Match Carbine, with 16 in (410 mm) barrel and M110 flash suppressor; MK 11 MOD 0; MK 11 MOD 1; MK 11 MOD 2

Specifications
- Mass: Match Rifle 10.75 lb (4.88 kg); LwMatch 9.5 lb (4.3 kg); Carbine 7.5 lb (3.4 kg); Sporter 8.75 lb (3.97 kg)
- Length: 1,118 mm (44.0 in)
- Barrel length: Match Rifle 24 in (610 mm); LwMatch & Sporter 20 in or 510 mm Carbine 16 in or 410 mm)
- Cartridge: 7.62×51mm NATO
- Action: Gas-operated, closed rotating bolt, Stoner bolt and carrier piston
- Rate of fire: Semi-automatic
- Feed system: 10- and 20-round detachable SR-25 pattern box magazine

The SR-25 (Stoner Rifle-25) is a designated marksman rifle and semi-automatic sniper rifle designed by Eugene Stoner and manufactured by Knight's Armament Company.

The SR-25 uses a rotating bolt and a Stoner bolt and carrier piston gas system. It is loosely based on Stoner's AR-10, rebuilt in its original 7.62×51mm NATO caliber. Up to 60% of parts of the SR-25 are interchangeable with the AR-15 and M16—everything but the upper and lower receivers, the hammer, the barrel assembly and the bolt carrier group. SR-25 barrels were originally manufactured by Remington Arms with its 5R (five grooves, right twist) rifling, with twist 1:11.25. The heavy 24-inch (610 mm) barrel is free-floating, so handguards are attached to the front of the receiver and do not touch the barrel.

== History ==
In the late 1950s, Eugene Stoner designed the AR-10 battle rifle to equip U.S. troops. It was accurate for an auto-loading rifle, but it lost the competition to the M14 rifle. The patent rights for the AR-10 and the AR-15 were sold to Colt's Manufacturing Company. Colt focused on the AR-15, giving others the ability to capitalize on the AR-10 system.

In the early 1990s, Stoner joined Knight's Armament Company. He continued his AR-10 design work. The result was the SR-25 (adding together the numbers of the AR-10 and AR-15) which improved the AR-10 design with M16A2 advancements and parts commonality. The original SR-25 was released in the early 1990s and had a heavy free-floating 24 in (610 mm) match grade barrel with a fiberglass handguard. It had a flat top upper receiver with a Mil-Std 1913 rail for mounting optics and a 2-stage match grade trigger. The bolt carrier was similar to the AR-10's, being chrome plated and having a captive firing pin retainer pin. The SR-25 was designed specifically to fire 168 gr (10.9 g) open-tip match cartridges. Accuracy was guaranteed at or under 1 minute of angle. At first, AR-10 type 20-round magazines were used, but they were later replaced by steel 20-round magazines resembling those used by the M16.

United States Special Operations Command took interest in the SR-25, particularly its high magazine capacity and faster engagement time compared to bolt-action rifles. After some modifications, SOCOM adopted the SR-25 as the Mk 11 MOD 0 in May 2000. Changes included a shorter 20 in (510 mm) barrel that could fire M118 and M118LR 7.62×51mm NATO rounds and had a quick detachable sound suppressor mount. An 11.35 in (288 mm) free-floating handguard rail system allowed mounting accessories. Flip-up front sights and adjustable back-up iron sights were added, and an M16A2 stock and pistol grip were used.

Beginning in mid-2011, SOCOM began divesting the Mk 11 MOD 0 from their inventory and replacing it with the SSR Mk 20, the sniper variant of the FN SCAR. The Mk 11 was completely replaced by 2017.

== Design ==
The SR-25 enhanced match rifle utilizes the newer URX II Picatinny-Weaver rail system, rather than the older Mk 11 free-floating RAS, on the top of the receiver to accept different scope mounts or a carrying handle with iron sights (front sight mounted on the rail located on the forward end of the non-modular handguard). The match version is designed to shoot at a precision of 0.5 minutes of angle, which corresponds to 0.5-inch (13 mm) groups at 100 yards (91 m).

The Mk 11 MOD 0 system is chambered for 7.62×51mm NATO, and is designed for match-grade ammunition. The Mk 11 system includes the rifle, 20 round box magazines, QD (Quick Detachable) scope rings, Leupold Mark 4 Mil-dot riflescope, Harris swivel-base bipod on a Knight's mount, and QD sound suppressor, which is also manufactured by Knight's Armament Co. Flip-up BUIS (Back up iron sights) are attached to the modified gas block and upper receiver.

The Mk 11 MOD 0 utilizes an Obermeyer 20 in (510 mm) match target barrel, along with a RAS (Rail Accessory System) fore-end made by KAC, consisting of an 11.35 in (288 mm) long match fore-end. The RAS allows for quick attachment/detachment of MIL-STD-1913 components. The aluminum fore-end makes no contact with the barrel forward of the receiver, allowing for improved accuracy. The Mk 11 MOD 0 has an empty weight of 15.3 lb (6.9 kg), and an overall length of 45.4 in (115 cm). The civilian version, using the longer 24 in (610 mm) match barrel, is guaranteed to produce groupings of less than 1 in (25 mm) at 100 yd (91 m), or 0.3 angular mil, using factory match loads.

During the Iraq War, the United States Marine Corps ordered 180 Mk 11 MOD 1 rifles which were Mk 11s equipped with the upper receiver of the M110 Semi-Automatic Sniper System. The M110 upper gave the Mk 11 MOD 1 a URX modular rail system and a flash suppressor on the barrel. These saw limited use before they were phased out when the Marines chose to purchase the Mk 11 MOD 2, which was simply the USSOCOM and U.S. Navy designation for the complete M110 rifle.

The SR-25 Enhanced Match (E.M.) Carbine is very similar to the M110 Semi-Automatic Sniper System, though the M110 utilizes the newer URX Rail system, a length-adjustable fixed buttstock, and an integrated flash suppressor. Starting in late 2011, USMC snipers began to replace Mk 11 MOD 0 rifles with the M110 on a one-for-one basis.

== Users ==
- Australia: Australian Army, Royal Australian Air Force Airfield Defence Guards and Police Tactical Groups.
- Philippines: Light Reaction Regiment.
- United States

== See also ==
- List of individual weapons of the U.S. Armed Forces
- Mk 12 Special Purpose Rifle – American designated marksman rifle
