= Robinson Armament M96 Expeditionary =

- Type: semi-automatic rifle
- Place of origin: United States

Production history
- Manufacturer: Robinson Armament Co.
- Produced: 1999-2011
- Variants: Expeditionary Rifle carbine Recon Carbine top-feed carbine ("Bren" configuration).

Specifications
- Barrel length: 20" "Expeditionary Rifle"; 17.5" carbine 16" "Recon Carbine"; 17.5" barreled top-feed carbine ("Bren" configuration)
- Cartridge: 5.56 x 45mm NATO
- Caliber: .223
- Action: gas operated, rotating bolt, long stroke piston
- Muzzle velocity: 3,150 ft/s (960 m/s) (M855A1 round)
- Effective firing range: 500 meters
- Feed system: STANAG magazine
- Sights: adjustable rear aperture and front protected post

The Robinson M96 is a 5.56 x 45mm NATO, semi-automatic rifle based on the Stoner 63 Modular Weapon System. Made by the Robinson Armament Co., the M96 can be arranged in a variety configurations from a standard rifle with a 20' barrel, to a carbine with a 16" barrel or even a top-fed carbine with a 17.5" barrel.

== Description ==
The Robinson M96 is based on the Stoner 63 modular weapon system. It's chambered for the .223 Remington/5.56 mm NATO cartridge, and uses STANAG 4179 AR-15 magazines. Barrels have 1-in-9 twist ratio as is common for .223 Remington semiautomatic rifles. The M96 is gas operated, with a fixed gas cylinder and moving piston connected to the operating rod and bolt carrier. All variants are equipped with a gas regulator, which allows fine-tuning for low or high powered cartridges, outside temperature, etc. and is probably unique for a civilian rifle in this caliber. The bolt carrier has been specially designed for strength and slow cyclic rate for improved reliability. The M96 bolt is a six-lug design somewhat similar to an AR-15 bolt but with larger, stronger lugs. The M96 receiver is stamped stainless steel with a special blackening treatment. The barrel is parkerized chromoly steel and the stocks are molded plastic. Incidentally, the buttstock is the one part of the M96 that is interchangeable with the Stoner 63. The M96 has adjustable military-type sights (rear aperture and front protected post) and does not have a standard scope mount or Picatinny rail. The Stoner 63 was expensive to manufacture as small cast parts needed to be precision welded onto sheet metal, and these production limitations carry over to the M96, with the manufacture of each gun requiring 2 to 3 hours of hand welding.

== Variants ==
Rendering of Robinson M96 Recon Carbine

The M96 has been offered in a 20" barrel rifle version (the "Expeditionary Rifle"), a 17.5" barreled carbine (no special name), a 16" barreled carbine (the "Recon Carbine"), and a 17.5" barreled top-feed carbine ("Bren" configuration). The M96 is nearly identical in external appearance to the Stoner 63 rifle/light machine gun, and was designed to be modular and configurable like the Stoner. However, the M96 has a somewhat different internal mechanism and is semi-auto only. No internal parts exchange between the M96 and the Stoner 63.

In the mid-1990s a US-based Class-III manufacturer (Arms-Tech Ltd. located in Phoenix, Arizona) offered the "Revere" M96-A1 weapon system on the Law Enforcement market. It was basically a selective-fire conversion system that turned the standard M96 rifle in either a "Commando" 16" barreled STANAG magazine-fed carbine or a 20" barreled belt-fed Squad Automatic Weapon. It was never put into regular production because the Robinson M96 was discontinued.

The M96 has a relatively small following, probably due in large part to its high price and new manufacturer. There do not appear to have been any military or law enforcement sales of the M96, probably for the same reasons. As of 2012, the rifle is no longer in production and spare parts are very difficult to find.

== See also ==
- Robinson Arms XCR
- Stoner 63
