= Robinson Armament Co. =

- Company type: Private
- Founded: 1994
- Headquarters: North Salt Lake, Utah, United States
- Products: Firearms
- Website: robinsonarmament.com

Robinson Armament Co. is a firearms manufacturer based in North Salt Lake, Utah, United States.

As of 2009, it employed 15 people. The company manufactures military-style semi-automatic rifles, including the XCR Modular Rifle.

The company has been outspoken against federal gun regulations.

== See also ==
- Robinson Armament XCR
- Robinson Armament M96 Expeditionary
