= Knight's Armament Company =

American firearms and firearms parts manufacturer

- Type: Private
- Industry: Defense
- Founded: 1982; 44 years ago
- Headquarters: Titusville, Florida, U.S.
- Products: Firearms, weapons, firearm accessories
- Website: www.KnightArmCo.com

Knight's Armament Company (KAC) is an American firearms and firearms parts manufacturer, known for producing the rail interface system (RIS) and the rail adapter system (RAS) grips for firearms use. The company produces a variety of firearms, including AR-15 and AR-10-style rifles.

KAC is owned by C. Reed Knight and is based in Titusville, Florida. Knight's Manufacturing Company (KMC) is the division of KAC responsible for producing products for the civilian market.

== History ==
The United States military, as well as other special forces and police around the world, use KAC RIS/RAS conversions for many popular firearms, including the American M16/M4 rifles and Heckler & Koch MP5 series submachine guns. The RIS/RAS system allows for the mounting of accessories to firearms without additional tools or modifications. The system is utilized alongside a KAC suppressor and forward grip on the "Special Operations Peculiar MODification" (SOPMOD) M4 carbine package in use by United States Special Operations Command (USSOCOM). The mounted accessories can include tactical flashlights, laser targeting units, bipods, and vertical foregrips.

KAC produces sound suppressors for the Heckler & Koch Mark 23 SOCOM pistol. KAC also produces a line of clip-on night vision and thermal weapon sights, including the AN/PVS-22 Universal Night Sight. KAC produces mounts for optics and grenade launchers, as well as backup iron sights.

Knight's Armament produces a line of firearms including the semi-automatic SR-15 line of rifles, the fully automatic SR-16 carbine, the semi-automatic SR-25 sniper rifle, the SR-25 based Mark 11 Mod 0 Sniper Weapon System, and the M110 Semi-Automatic Sniper System. KAC designed and produces the Knight's Armament Company PDW and also produces the Stoner LMG in limited quantities. In 2011, KAC released the SR15/SR16 E3 line of rifles.

In September 2023, the company was selected to provide the Knight's Stoner 1 variant of its SR-16 rifle to the British Army Special Operations Brigade and to the Royal Marines.
