= List of 5.56×45mm NATO firearms =

The table below gives a list of firearms that can fire the 5.56×45mm NATO cartridge, first developed and used in the late 1960s for the M16 rifle, which to date, is the most widely produced weapon in this caliber. Not all countries that use weapons chambered in this caliber are in NATO.

This table is sortable for every column.

Name	Type	Country	Image	Years of service	Notes
FARA 83	Assault rifle	Argentina		1984–present	
Leader Dynamics Series T2 MK5	Assault rifle	Australia		1978	
F88 Austeyr	Bullpup assault rifle	Australia		1985–present	Licensed copy of the Steyr AUG.
EF88 Austeyr	Bullpup assault rifle	Australia		2015–present	Upgraded version of the F88 Austeyr.
F89 LSW	Light machine gun	Australia		1989–present	Licensed copy of the FN Minimi.
Omark Model 44	Bolt action target rifle	Australia		1968	
Steyr AUG	Bullpup assault rifle	Austria		1978–present	
Steyr Scout	Bolt action sniper rifle	Austria		1999–present	
FN CAL	Assault rifle	Belgium		1966–1975	
FN FNC	Assault rifle	Belgium		1979–present	
FN F2000	Bullpup assault rifle	Belgium		2001–present	
FN SCAR-L	Assault rifle	Belgium		2009–present	Also produced in the U.S.
FN Minimi	Light machine gun	Belgium		1974–present	
IMBEL MD	Assault rifle	Brazil		1985–present	
IMBEL IA2	Assault rifle	Brazil		2012–present	
AR-M1	Assault rifle	Bulgaria		2000–present	
Colt Canada C7	Assault rifle	Canada		1984–present	
Colt Canada C8	Carbine	Canada		1994–present	
Colt Canada C9	Light machine gun	Canada		1980s–present	Licensed copy of the FN Minimi.
Norinco CQ	Assault rifle	China		1980s–present	Unlicensed copy of the M16 rifle.
Norinco CQ-A	Carbine	China		2006–present	Unlicensed copy of the M4 carbine.
QBZ-97	Bullpup assault rifle	China		1997–present	5.56×45mm NATO variant of QBZ-95.
Norinco AK-2000	Assault rifle	China		2000s–present	Copy of the AK-101.
QBZ-03	Assault rifle	China		2003–present	Export variant is chambered in 5.56×45mm NATO.
QBU-97A	Semi-automatic bullpup sniper rifle	China		1997–present	5.56×45mm NATO variant of QBU-88.
SIG SG 530 FAMAE	Assault rifle	Chile		1991–present	Chilean version of SIG SG 540.
Galil Córdova	Assault rifle	Colombia		2015–present	
HS Produkt VHS	Assault rifle	Croatia		2009–present	
ČZ 2000	Assault rifle	Czechoslovakia		1990s	Also available as light machine gun and carbine.
CZ 805 BREN	Assault rifle	Czech Republic		2011–present	
CZ BREN 2	Assault rifle	Czech Republic		2017–present	
CZ BREN 3	Assault rifle	Czech Republic		2024–present	
Wieger StG-940	Assault rifle	East Germany		1985–1990	
FAMAS	Bullpup assault rifle	France		1978–present	
Sako M23	Assault rifle	Finland		2024–present	
Heckler & Koch HK33	Assault rifle	Germany		1968–present	
Heckler & Koch G41	Assault rifle	Germany		1984–present	
Heckler & Koch G36	Assault rifle	Germany		1997–present	
Heckler & Koch HK416	Assault rifle	Germany		2004–present	
Haenel MK 556	Assault rifle	Germany		2017–present	
Heckler & Koch HK43	Semi-automatic rifle	Germany		1974–1989	Civilian version of Heckler & Koch HK33.
Heckler & Koch SL6	Semi-automatic rifle	Germany		1980s-1991	
Heckler & Koch SL8	Semi-automatic rifle	Germany		1998–present	Civilian version of Heckler & Koch G36.
SIG Sauer SIG516	Semi-automatic rifle	Germany		2010–present	
Heckler & Koch HK23E	General-purpose machine gun	Germany		1980s-present	A magazine-fed variant, the HK13E, was also produced.
Heckler & Koch MG4	Light machine gun	Germany		2005–present	
AOR M21	Assault rifle	Greece		2020–present	
Gestamen G224	Light machine gun	Hungary		2025	
INSAS rifle	Assault rifle	India		1998–present	
Excalibur rifle	Assault rifle	India		2017–present	
DRDO Close Quarter Battle carbine	Carbine	India		2026–present	
Pindad SS1	Assault rifle	Indonesia		1991–present	Licensed copy of the FN FNC.
Pindad SS2	Assault rifle	Indonesia		2006–present	
Komodo Armament D5	Assault rifle	Indonesia		2014–present	
IFAR 22	Bullpup assault rifle	Indonesia		2022	
Pindad SS3-M1	Carbine	Indonesia		2022	Indonesian version of M4 carbine
PC 816	Assault rifle	Indonesia			Indonesian version of CAR 816
Pindad SPM-1	Semi-automatic rifle	Indonesia		2016–present	
Pindad SM3	Light machine gun	Indonesia		2006–present	Licensed copy of the FN Minimi.
KH-2002	Bullpup assault rifle	Iran		2003–2012	
Fateh rifle	Assault rifle	Iran		2014–present	
Masaf 5,56	Assault rifle	Iran		2017–present	Iranian version of HK416 and M4 carbine.
IMI Galil	Assault rifle	Israel		1972–present	
IWI Tavor	Bullpup assault rifle	Israel		2001–present	
IWI Galil ACE	Assault rifle	Israel		2008–present	
IWI Tavor X95	Bullpup assault rifle	Israel		2009–present	
IWI ARAD	Carbine	Israel		2019–present	
IWI Negev	Light machine gun	Israel		1997–present	
Beretta AR70/90	Assault rifle	Italy		1990–present	
Beretta ARX160	Assault rifle	Italy		2008–present	
Beretta AS70/90	Light machine gun	Italy		1980s	
Benelli MR1	Semi-automatic rifle	Italy		2005-present	
Howa Type 89	Assault rifle	Japan		1989–present	
Sumitomo Minimi	Light machine gun	Japan		1975–present	Japanese version of FN Minimi.
Howa Type 20	Assault rifle	Japan		2020–present	
VB Berapi LP06	Bullpup assault rifle	Malaysia		2006	
AGX-16	Rotary-barrel machine gun	Mexico		2023	
FX-05 Xiuhcoatl	Assault rifle	Mexico		2008–present	
SAX-200 Xiuhcoatl	Submachine gun	Mexico		2023–present	
DI MA-1	Assault rifle	Myanmar		2002–present	
DI MA-1 Mk. III	Bullpup assault rifle	Myanmar		2012–present	
M+G project	Squad automatic weapon	Netherlands		1962	
Special Operations Assault Rifle	Assault rifle	Philippines		2004–present	Based on the M4 carbine.
Marine Scout Sniper Rifle	Semi-automatic sniper rifle	Philippines		1996–present	
PVAR Rifle	Assault rifle	Philippines		2011–present	
FB Beryl	Assault rifle	Poland		1997–present	
FB Mini-Beryl	Carbine assault rifle	Poland		1997–present	
FB MSBS Grot	Assault rifle	Poland		2017–present	
Kbkm wz. 2003	Light machine gun	Poland		2000s	
A-91	Bullpup assault rifle	Russia		1990–present	
AK-108	Assault rifle	Russia		1994–present	5.56mm variant of the AK-107.
AK-101	Assault rifle	Russia		1995–present	
AK-102	Carbine assault rifle	Russia		1995–present	
AK-19	Assault rifle	Russia		2020–present	5.56mm variant of the AK-12.
Saiga semi-automatic rifle	Semi-automatic rifle	Russia		1990s-present	Designed for the civilian market.
Kalashnikov SR-1	Assault rifle	Russia		2018–present	Civilian variant of the AK-107.
Zastava M80	Assault rifle	Yugoslavia; Serbia		1980–present	
Zastava M85	Carbine assault rifle	Yugoslavia; Serbia		1985	
Zastava M90	Assault rifle	Yugoslavia; Serbia		1990–present	
Zastava M21	Assault rifle	Serbia		2004–present	Serbian issue AK variant.
SAR 80	Assault rifle	Singapore		1976–present	
SR 88	Assault rifle	Singapore		1984–2000	
SAR 21	Bullpup assault rifle	Singapore		1999–present	
Conventional Multirole Combat Rifle	Assault rifle	Singapore		2014	
BR18	Bullpup assault rifle	Singapore		2018–present	
Ultimax 100	Light machine gun	Singapore		1982–present	
Vektor R4	Assault rifle	South Africa		1980–present	Licensed variant of the IMI Galil.
Vektor CR-21	Bullpup assault rifle	South Africa		1997	Prototype – never entered service.
Vektor Mini-SS	Light machine gun	South Africa		1986–present	
Daewoo Precision Industries K1	Carbine assault rifle	South Korea		1981–present	Although the design is very similar to the carbine, it is officially classified as a submachine gun in the South Korean military. K1AC1, a modified version with modern specifications.
Daewoo Precision Industries K2	Assault rifle Carbine	South Korea		1985–present	There are two variants, K2C, a carbine version with a short barrel, and K2C1, modified with modern specifications.
S&T STC-16 (SNT Motiv K13)	Carbine assault rifle	South Korea		2016–present	Based on the AR-15 Carbine with some modification.
SNT Motiv K17	Carbine assault rifle	South Korea		2025–present	Based on the AR-15 Carbine with some modification.
Dasan Machineries K16	Assault rifle	South Korea		2018–present	Based on the M4 carbine and HK 416.
S&T Daewoo K11	Bullpup assault rifle	South Korea		2010–present	Also fitted with grenade launcher.
Daewoo Precision Industries K3	Light machine gun	South Korea		1991–present	
SNT Motiv K15	Light machine gun	South Korea		2018–present	
CETME Model L	Assault rifle	Spain		1987–1999	
CETME Ameli	Light machine gun	Spain		1982–present	
FFV 890	Assault rifle	Sweden		1975–present	Based on the IMI Galil.
Ak 5	Carbine assault rifle	Sweden		1986–present	Licensed copy of the FN FNC.
Automatkarbin 24	Assault rifle	Sweden		2024–present	Based on the AR-15–style rifle
Ksp 90	Light machine gun	Sweden		1990–present	Licensed copy of the FN Minimi.
SIG SG 530	Assault rifle	Switzerland		1960s–1970s	
SIG SG 540	Assault rifle	Switzerland		1977–present	
SIG SG 550	Assault rifle	Switzerland		1990–present	
SG 552 Commando	Carbine	Switzerland		1990–present	
SIG Sauer SIG516	Carbine assault rifle	Switzerland		2010–present	
B&T APC 556	Carbine assault rifle	Switzerland		2011–present	
MPT-55	Assault rifle	Turkey		2014–present	
KCR-556	Assault rifle	Turkey		2018–present	
T65 assault rifle	Assault rifle	Taiwan		1976–present	
T86 assault rifle	Assault rifle	Taiwan		2000–present	
T91 assault rifle	Assault rifle	Taiwan		2003–present	
XT-97 Assault Rifle	Assault rifle	Taiwan		2008	
T112 assault rifle	Assault rifle	Taiwan		2023–present	
T75 light machine gun	Light machine gun	Taiwan		1992–present	Unlicensed variant of the FN Minimi.
CAR 816	Assault rifle	United Arab Emirates		2014–present	
Sterling SAR-87	Assault rifle	United Kingdom		1980s	
SA80	Assault rifle	United Kingdom		1985–present	Also available as a light support weapon and carbine.
ArmaLite AR-15	Assault rifle	United States		1962–1963	
Stoner 63	Assault rifle	United States		1963–1983	Also available as light machine gun and carbine.
M16 rifle	Assault rifle	United States		1964–present	
ArmaLite AR-18	Assault rifle	United States		1969–present	
ArmaLite AR-100	Assault rifle	United States			Based on the ArmaLite AR-16. Also available as light machine gun and carbine.
M4 carbine	Carbine assault rifle	United States		1994–present	
LWRC M6	Carbine assault rifle	United States		2006–present	
Robinson Arms XCR	Assault rifle	United States		2006–present	
M27 Infantry Automatic Rifle	Assault rifle	United States		2010–present	Based on the Heckler & Koch HK416. Also available as a light support weapon and designated marksman rifle.
Remington ACR	Assault rifle	United States		2010–present	
Remington-Daniel Defense DDM4	Carbine Personal defense weapon	United States		2010s	
SIG MCX	Assault rifle	United States		2015–present	
Desert Tech MDR	Bullpup; Assault rifle Semi-automatic rifle	United States		2017–present	
Mk 12 Special Purpose Rifle	Designated marksman rifle	United States		2002–2017	
Ruger Mini-14	Semi-automatic rifle	United States		1973–present	Saw limited usage by police and military units as the fully-automatic AC556.
Smith & Wesson M&P15	Semi-automatic rifle	United States		2006–present	
Kel-Tec SU-16	Semi-automatic rifle	United States		2000s-present	Designed for the civilian market.
XM214 Microgun	Rotary-barrel machine gun	United States		1970s–1990s	Scaled down version of the M134 Minigun.
M249 light machine gun	Light machine gun	United States		1984–present	Derived from the FN Minimi.
Colt Automatic Rifle	Light machine gun	United States		1994–present	Derived from the M16 rifle.
STL-556 VN	Assault rifle	Vietnam		2024–present	Based on the Galil ACE.
SHMT-M1	Assault rifle	Vietnam		2024–present	Amphibious version based on the ACE.

== See also ==
- List of assault rifles
- List of 7.62×51mm NATO firearms
- List of 7.62×39mm firearms
- 5.45×39mm
- 5.8×42mm
