= FFV 890 =

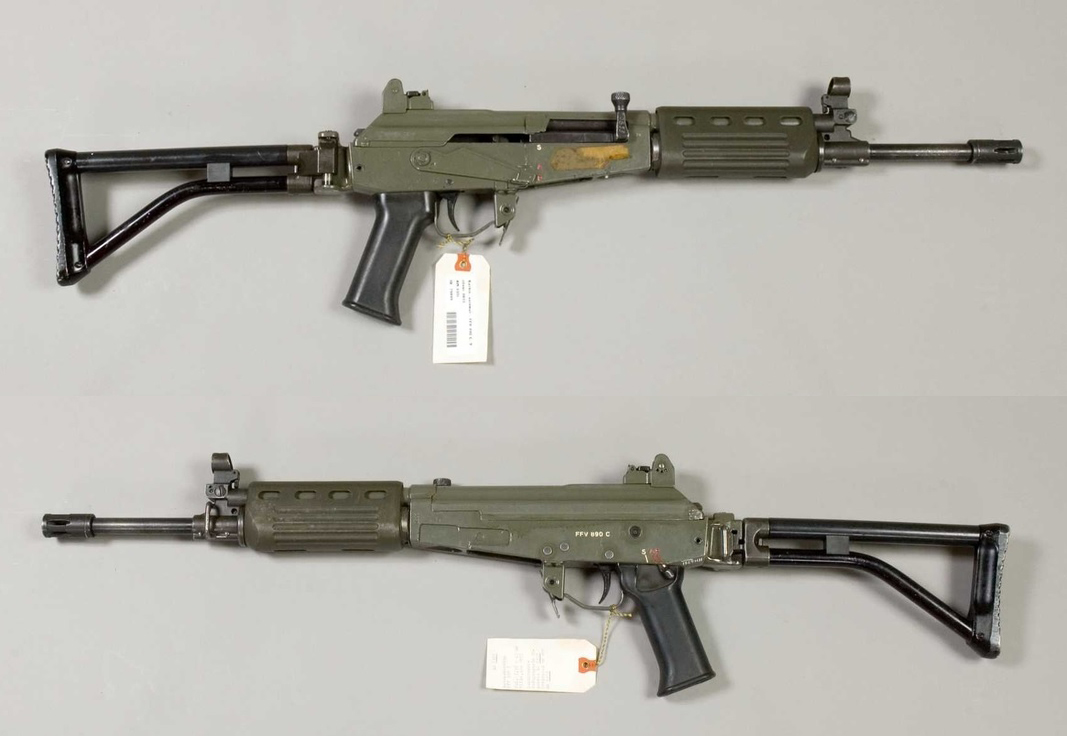
- FFV 890C
- Type: Assault rifle
- Place of origin: Sweden

Service history
- Used by: Swedish Armed Forces (trials only); Swedish Police Authority

Production history
- Designer: Israel Military Industries; Försvarets fabriksverk
- Designed: 1974–1980
- Manufacturer: Israel Military Industries; Försvarets fabriksverk
- Produced: 1975–1980
- No. built: <1,000
- Variants: FFV 890 (Galil ARM); FFV 890 (Galil SAR); FFV 890C

Specifications
- Mass: 3.5 kg (7.7 lb) empty (FFV 890C)
- Length: 860 mm (34 in) stock extended 625 mm (24.6 in) stock folded
- Barrel length: 348 mm (13.7 in)
- Cartridge: 5.56×45mm NATO
- Action: Gas-operated, rotating bolt
- Rate of fire: 650 rounds/min
- Muzzle velocity: 860 m/s
- Feed system: 35-round detachable double stack IMI Galil-type box magazine
- Sights: Two-setting rear aperture sight with flip up open night sight, forward hooded post with flip up night sight post.

The FFV 890 was a Swedish assault rifle manufactured and designed by Försvarets Fabriksverk. The FFV 890 was based on the IMI Galil through a manufacturing licence, which in turn was based on the Finnish Valmet RK 62 and ultimately the Soviet AK-47. The FFV 890 was designed between 1975 and 1980, and its final iteration, FFV 890C, competed in the Swedish Armed Forces trials for the new 5.56×45mm NATO assault rifle, where it ended up as a runner-up to the FN FNC, which was then chosen as the Ak 5. The FFV 890C was never widely adopted by any service, though some rifles were used by the Swedish police.

== History ==
The FFV 890 was initially based on the ARM variant of the IMI Galil, and the earliest rifles were indeed just plain Galil ARMs manufactured by Israel Military Industries (nowadays Israel Weapon Industries) in Israel. Over the course of the development FFV decided to move to the Galil SAR as a base design, and after some IMI manufactured FFV 890 rifles FFV started licence manufacturing in the Eskilstuna Carl Gustafs Stads Gevärsfaktori for the FFV 890C. It is unclear whether complete rifles ever had all of their parts manufactured by FFV. Both IMI and the Finnish state firearms company Valmet (Valmet firearms division was later merged to Sako) participated in the production of parts and assisting FFV in the production of the 890. The chief firearms designer of Valmet, Timo Hyytinen, described working with FFV as easy and unproblematic, but that the Swedish Armed Forces had resentment towards cooperation with Valmet.

FFV entered the FFV 890 into the Swedish Armed Forces trials for the new 5.56 mm assault rifle. The initial trials took place in 1974–1976, with the FFV 890 (both the ARM and SAR) competing against the Heckler & Koch HK33, FN FNC, FN CAL, Colt M16A1, Steyr AUG, Beretta AR70, ArmaLite AR-18, SIG SG 540 and Stoner 63. The FFV 890 and FN FNC turned out superior over the other competitors, especially in regard to reliability in winter conditions, which led to the disqualification of the other competitors (although FN CAL was disqualified due to production being shut down).

Between 1975 and 1979 FFV dropped the ARM variant and continued development with only the SAR variant. This development finally led to the FFV 890C, which was different to the Galil SAR in some aspects: it had a shorter gas system (shorter gas tube and piston), two-piece clamshell front handguard similar to FN FNC and Valmet RK 62 76, redesigned and larger magazine release lever, larger right side selector, larger trigger guard, shorter barrel (348 mm), case deflector attached to the receiver cover, OD green paint, rubber recoil buffer and Swedish-based markings for the selector positions.

After some trials, the Swedish Armed Forces requested some changes to the FFV 890C. FFV incorporated the following changes: horizontally oriented charging handle (similar to the AK) instead of the vertically oriented charging handle of the Galil, return to the standard Galil trigger guard and magazine release lever, additional notch to the right side selector lever, additional cross bar safety similar to the FN MAG, and the rear sight was changed to similar to the rear sight in the FN Minimi. The stock was also painted green.

After the 1979-1980 trials in the 11th Infantry Regiment at Växjö, the military and soldiers having participated in the trials described the FFV 890C as superior to the FN FNC, but the FN FNC was described as better in the official documents; officially neither rifle passed the trials. The FNC was cheaper and employed more modern manufacturing methods over the 890C, namely stamping instead of milling. FFV attempted to convert the manufacturing process of the 890C to stamped receivers similar to the AKM, but was unsuccessful in doing so. There were political difficulties between Israel and Sweden at the time, with the Swedish government not having high regard for Israel, which may also have played part in the decision. The adoption of an initially Soviet design would possibly also have been problematic to the neutral non-alignment policy of Sweden at the time. The Swedish Armed Forces were also unwilling towards any deeper cooperation with the Finnish state company Valmet, which was assisting FFV in the production of the parts of the 890C, and they sought a solution which wouldn't have included cooperation with Valmet.
The FMV (Swedish Defence Materiel Administration) officially declared the FN FNC as the winner after the trials had ended.

Over the course of the development of the FFV 890C, less than 1000 rifles were manufactured.

FFV later sold all of the blueprints and development work to Valmet, which presumably incorporated some features into its rifle development.

== Design ==
Gas operation with a long-stroke piston, a system found in FFV 890.

The FFV 890 is based on the Kalashnikov gas operation with a long-stroke piston, and a rotating bolt which locks to the receiver, to which (the receiver) the barrel is threaded in as in the IMI Galil and Valmet RK 62. The main control interface is very similar to that of the Galil and RK 62, with some minor differences, which vary between the initial and later FFV 890C versions.

Compared to the Galil and RK 62, the FFV 890C also has some unique features. The rifle is painted in OD green, and mounts a green clamshell front handguard. Some later versions incorporating features requested by the Swedish Armed Forces have such unique features as a cross bar safety, Ak 4 trigger groups, selectors and such. The rifle also lacks any bayonet mount.

The sights are identical to the Galil SAR, a two position rear aperture sight with trajectory for 300 and 500 metres, an open flip-up night sight and full circle hooded front sight with a flip up night sight post.

The rifle has a 22 mm flash hider which can be used to fire rifle grenades.

== Variants ==
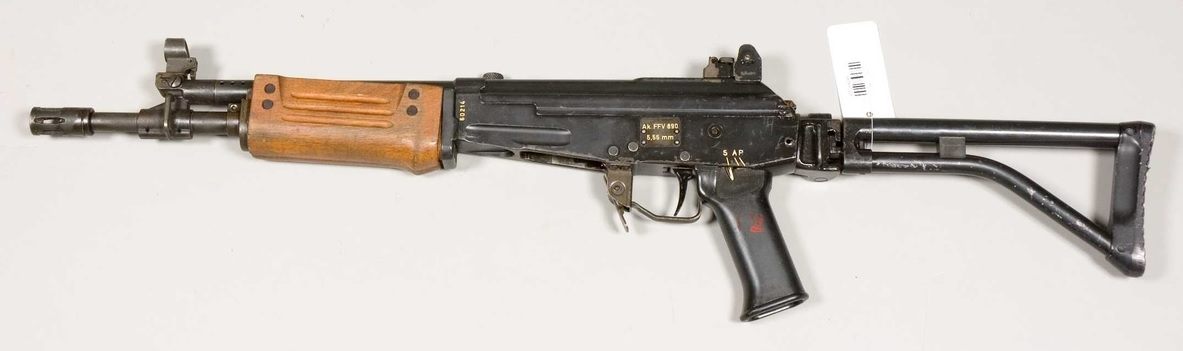
FFV 890 (Galil SAR) showing the brass plate affixed by FFV.

- FFV 890 type ARM: IMI manufactured Galil ARM renamed by FFV.
- FFV 890 type SAR: IMI manufactured Galil SAR renamed by FFV, with a brass plate affixed to cover IMI markings with FFV markings.
- FFV 890C: Main FFV manufactured variant for the Swedish Armed Forces trials, based on the FFV 890 SAR/Galil SAR. At least two different main subvariants exist, model 1 is the initial FFV variant sent to the 1979 trials, and model 2 incorporates the changes requested by the Swedish Armed Forces.

== Users ==
- Sweden: Tested by Swedish Armed Forces, some used by the Swedish police.
