= Automatkarbin 5 =

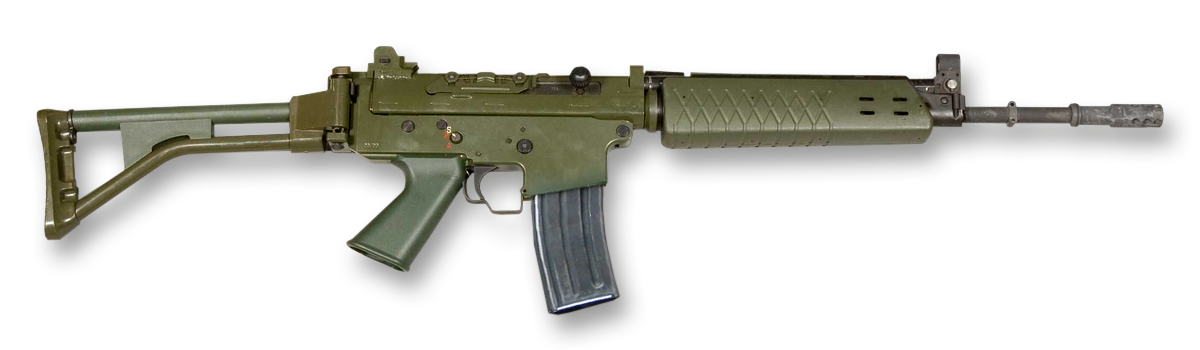
- Ak 5 with the old tubular steel stock
- Type: Assault rifle Carbine (AK5D)
- Place of origin: Sweden

Service history
- In service: 1986–present
- Used by: See Users
- Wars: Kosovo War; War in Afghanistan; Chadian Civil War (2005-2010); Operation Artemis; War in Mali

Production history
- Designed: 1982
- Manufacturer: FN Herstal; Carl Gustafs stads gevärsfaktori
- Produced: 1986–present
- No. built: 200,000
- Variants: See Variants

Specifications
- Mass: Ak 5 empty 3.9 kg (8.60 lb); Ak 5B empty 4.8 kg (10.58 lb); Ak 5C empty 4.0 kg (8.82 lb); Ak 5 loaded 4.5 kg (9.92 lb); Ak 5B loaded 5.4 kg (11.90 lb); Ak 5C loaded 4.5 kg (9.92 lb); 30-round steel magazine empty: 0.17 kg (0.37 lb); 30-round plastic magazine empty: 0.10 kg (0.22 lb)
- Length: Ak 5(B) 1,010 mm (39.8 in) (stock extended); Ak 5(B) 750 mm (29.5 in) (stock folded); Ak 5C 852 mm (33.5 in) – 914 mm (36.0 in) (stock extended); Ak 5C 667 mm (26.3 in) (stock folded)
- Barrel length: Ak 5 / Ak 5B 450 mm (17.7 in); Ak 5C 350 mm (13.8 in)
- Cartridge: 5.56×45mm NATO
- Caliber: 5.56 mm
- Action: Gas-operated, rotating bolt
- Rate of fire: 650–700 RPM
- Muzzle velocity: Ak 5(B) 930 m/s (3,051 ft/s); Ak 5C 870 m/s (2,854 ft/s)
- Effective firing range: 250 and 400 m sight adjustments
- Maximum firing range: 3,000 m (3,281 yd)
- Feed system: 30-round detachable STANAG magazine
- Sights: Rear flip aperture, front post iron sights 513 mm (20.2 in) sight radius (standard rifle) optical sights

The Ak 5 (Swedish: Automatkarbin 5 , lit. 'Automatic Carbine 5') is a license-built Swedish version of the Belgian FN FNC assault rifle, with certain modifications, mostly to adapt the weapon to the partially subarctic Swedish climate. The Ak 5 is the current service rifle of the Swedish Armed Forces, adopted in 1986, partially replacing the Ak 4, a license-built version of the Heckler & Koch G3.

In 2021, Sweden announced that they were looking to develop a new rifle in collaboration with Finland, which would replace the Ak 5. In 2023 this rifle took shape as the new Automatkarbin 24.

== History ==
In the mid-1970s, despite the failure of the Nytt infanterivapen (New Infantry Weapon) program, the Swedish Armed Forces decided to continue to follow the general transition towards smaller calibre ammunition and directed the Defence Materiel Administration to procure a suitable replacement for the Ak 4 capable of using 5.56×45mm NATO ammunition, which under STANAG 4172 is a standard cartridge for NATO forces as well as many non-NATO countries. The weapon was required to be highly reliable in the subarctic climate of northernmost Sweden, as well as being easy to handle and maintain, while meeting a certain minimum level of accuracy.

From 1975 the FMV evaluated and tested the Colt M16A1, Stoner 63A1, ArmaLite AR-18, Steyr AUG, Beretta M70, IMI Galil, FN FNC, FN CAL, SIG 540, HK33 and FFV 890C (a Swedish Galil variant) 5.56×45mm NATO assault rifles. The FN FNC and FFV 890C were tested from 1979 to 1980 at infantry regiment I11 in Växjö.

After further testing from 1981 to 1985 the FMV eventually chose the Belgian FN FNC, which received several modifications. These included a larger trigger guard and cocking handle (to allow for operation while wearing winter gloves, a necessity for temperatures reaching down to −30 °C (−22 °F)), a larger handguard, a different collapsible shoulder stock, different iron sights and gas block, a modified bolt, deletion of the 3-round burst capability, and a corrosion-resistant green (instead of black) finish. Further the detachable box magazines were modified to be interchangeable with the M16 rifle STANAG magazines. This rifle was finally accepted by the Swedish military as the Ak 5 in 1986.

Swedish blank ammunition uses a wooden plug in place of a bullet, so the flash suppressor was fitted with grooves to accept the Swedish blank-firing adaptor, which besides choking the barrel to ensure enough gas pressure for reliable operation also prevents potentially dangerous pieces of wood from leaving the weapon by smashing the plug into a fine sawdust. The flash suppressor was also designed to accept rifle grenades, although none have been accepted into service.

During the troop trials there were an alarming number of complaints by soldiers about damaged teeth from being struck in the mouth by the muzzle end. This was revealed to be caused by the practice of having the weapon slung across the chest rather than the back. Rather than changing this practice (which would reduce the ability of the soldier to rapidly bring the rifle into action), a special plastic cap (later changed to a hard rubber version) was issued to cover the muzzle.

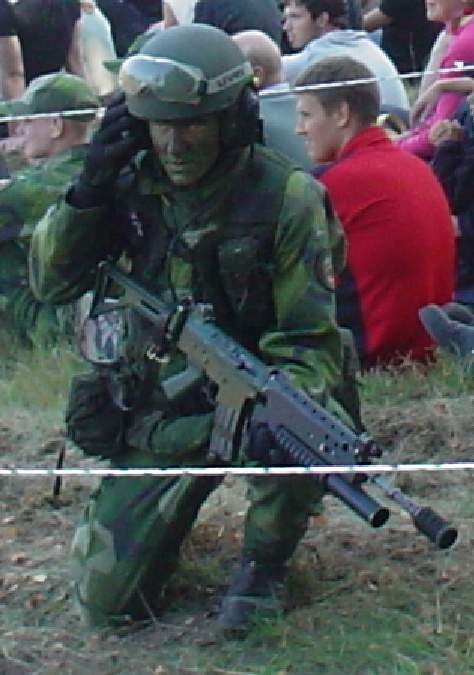
Ak 5 with teeth guard and M203 mounted at public exhibition event.

== Variants ==
The Ak 5 is the Swedish licensed produced version of the FN FNC. Along with its other variants (Ak 5B, Ak 5C and Ak 5D), all respectively have a cyclic rate of fire of around 650–700 rounds per minute (RPM).

=== CGA5C2 ===
The CGA5C2 (Carl Gustav Automatic Carbine 5 C2) was a prototype model during the evaluation and development of the Ak 5 in the late 1970s and early 1980s.

=== Ak 5 ===
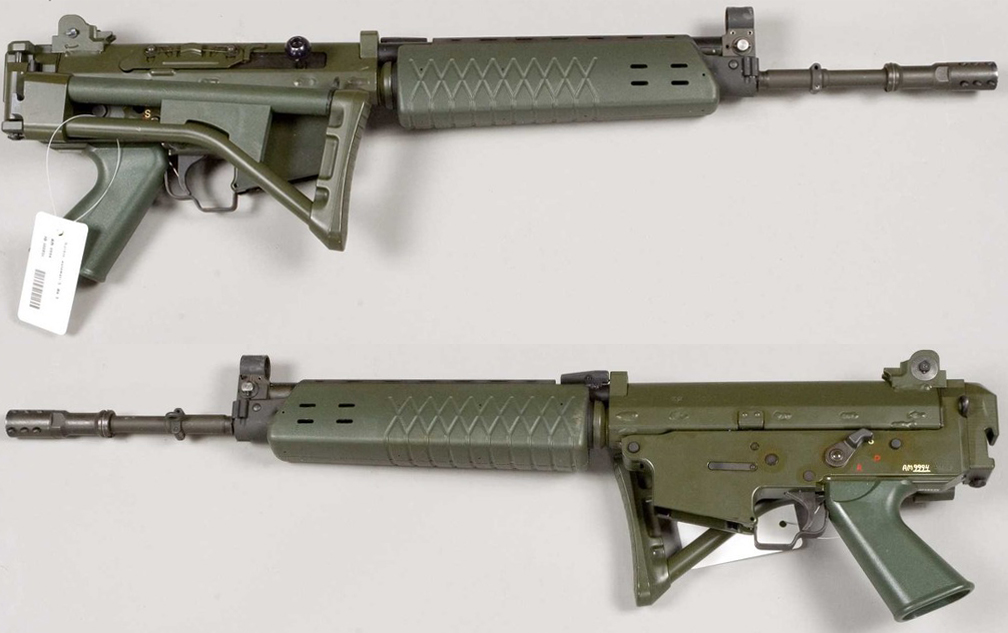
The FFV Ak 5 with its buttstock folded

The first versions of the Ak 5 family were made by the Swedish company FFV Ordnance AB (later part of Saab Bofors Dynamics) under license from FN, with deliveries starting in 1986. This version of the Ak 5 is still in the inventory of the Swedish Armed Forces, but is no longer issued to soldiers, having been replaced by the Ak 5C and Ak 5D. This version uses fixed iron sights, and the Swedish Armed Forces have estimated that the maximum practical distance is 400 meters, but it can be used at longer ranges. This brings it in line with the M16, using the Swedish Armed Forces definition of maximum practical distance.

As issued, the Ak 5 did not have a bayonet lug. A bayonet lug adaptor (using the Ak 4 bayonet) is fitted to some rifles for ceremonial duties, such as the Royal Guards at the Stockholm Palace.

=== Ak 5B ===
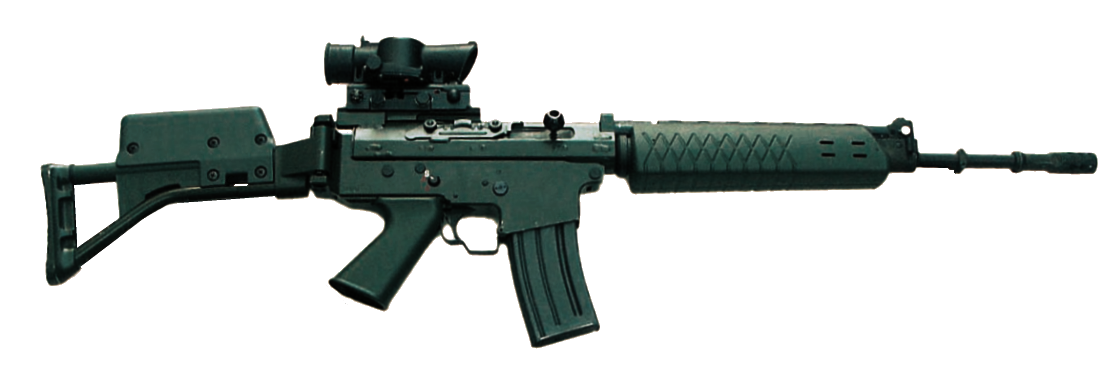
Ak 5B with 4×25.5 SUSAT sight

The Ak 5B is the designated marksman version of the Ak 5. Modifications include fittings for a 4×25.5 SUSAT L9A1 tritium sight, a cheek pad on the buttstock, and removal of the iron sights. This weapon was typically carried by squad leaders. This version weighs 4.8 kg (without magazine) and 5.4 kg (with full magazine). Approximately 5200 of this version were made. It is no longer in service.

=== Ak 5C ===
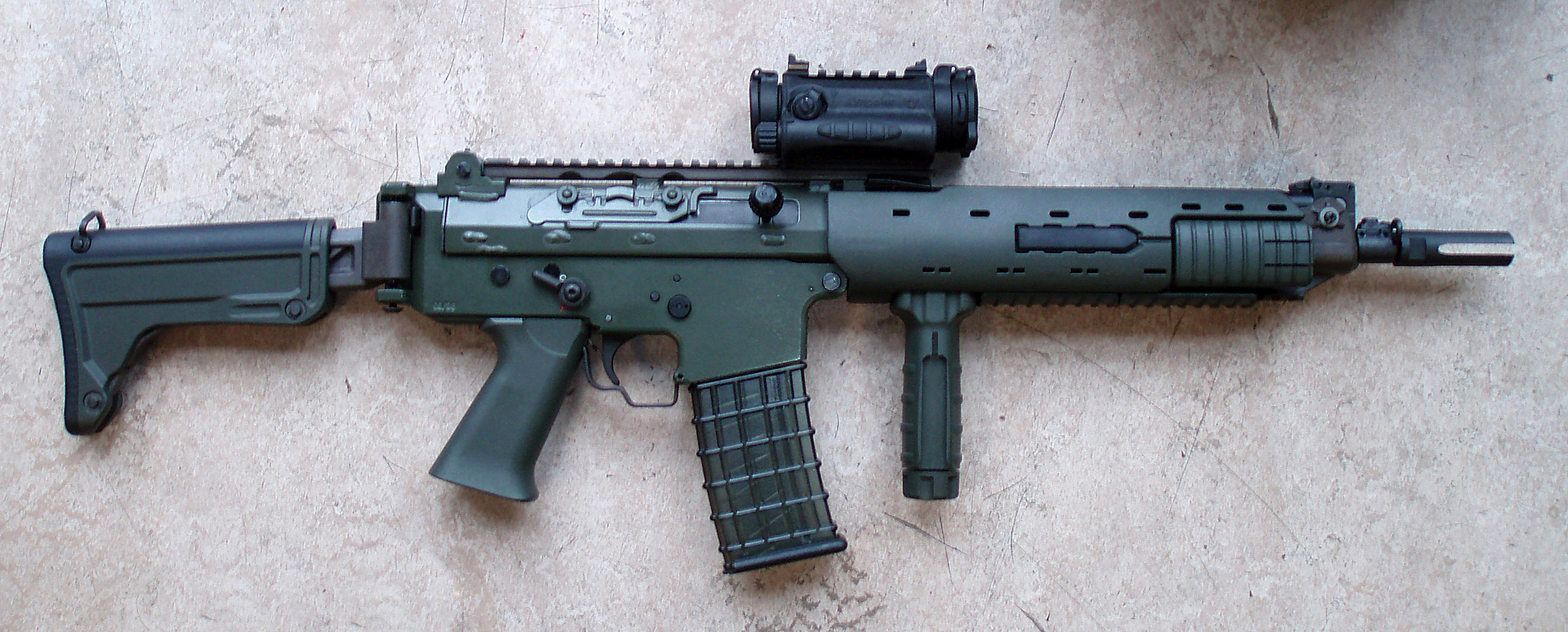
The final version of the Ak 5C with an Aimpoint red dot sight and forward vertical grip

At the beginning of the 21st century the Swedish military wanted a more modern assault rifle for integration in a future Swedish soldier program. The rifle had to have a Rail Integration System, better ergonomics and improved reliability. Instead of purchasing a new assault rifle, Sweden opted to modify the existing Ak 5B rifle family already in use reducing program risks and costs.

Before the Ak 5C went into mass production, it was thoroughly evaluated. This was done by having certain units use an experimental model designated Ak 5CF where "F" stands for the Swedish word försök (in this context, experiment or trial). During the trial over one million rounds were fired and the rifles exhibited a Mean Rounds Between Stoppage value of 3,500. The test users found the test weapon too heavy and long so the barrel length was reduced to 350 mm to reduce overall weight and move the center of gravity closer to the user. These tests were completed in June 2005 and four months later, the FMV signed a contract with Saab Bofors Dynamics covering the modification of nearly 40,000 Ak 5 assault rifles, which took the company approximately four years to implement. Serial deliveries were scheduled to begin in June 2006 and the Ak 5C was first issued to priority units serving in Afghanistan (ISAF), Chad (EUFOR Chad/CAR), and Kosovo (KFOR).

The Ak 5C is the modernized version of the original Ak 5, following the trend of modular weapons. One of the most significant improvements is the MIL-STD-1913 rail system to which a variety of different optics, lights and sights can be mounted, such as telescopic sights and image intensifiers. The double gas position, iron sights and bolt catch of the original Ak 5 rifle family were discarded.

New features of the Ak 5C compared to the original Ak 5:

- Increased reliability Mean Rounds Between Stoppage > 2,000
- Barrel shortened to 350 mm (13.8 in)
- Weight reduced to 3.8 kg (8.38 lb)
- MIL-STD-1913 Picatinny rail system at the top and bottom of the hand guard
- Adjustable buttstock
- Foldable emergency iron sights (for ranges up to 300 m)
- Automatic bolt catch
- Ambidextrous selector levers
- Translucent 30-round plastic box magazines
- New slimmer pistol grip at a different angle (similar to the one on Ksp 90)
- Modified hand guard with cut outs for pressure switches and cables on the right and left side
- Forward vertical grip at 6 o'clock position (detachable)
- New prong-type flash suppressor
- Tactical sling (nylon)
- Fire selector on both sides of the rifle.

The Aimpoint CS red dot sight with a 4 MOA red dot reticle was chosen as the standard optical sight for the Ak 5C. Other day or night aiming optics can also be mounted on the MIL-STD-1913 Picatinny rail system.

There has been some confusion about the M203 grenade launcher. While the Ak 5C is prepared to accept the launcher, the correct designation (translated from Swedish) would be "Ak 5[version] with grenade attachment" for the combination. The bayonet-lug adapter for the Ak 4 bayonet is not used with the Ak 5C. Instead a new bayonet for ceremonial use only was issued to the troops. This bayonet is attached to the 6 o'clock rail on the hand guard.

The Ak 5C is now the standard-issue rifle of the Swedish armed forces, and production of the A and B versions are currently discontinued and existing stock put in storage.

=== Ak 5D ===
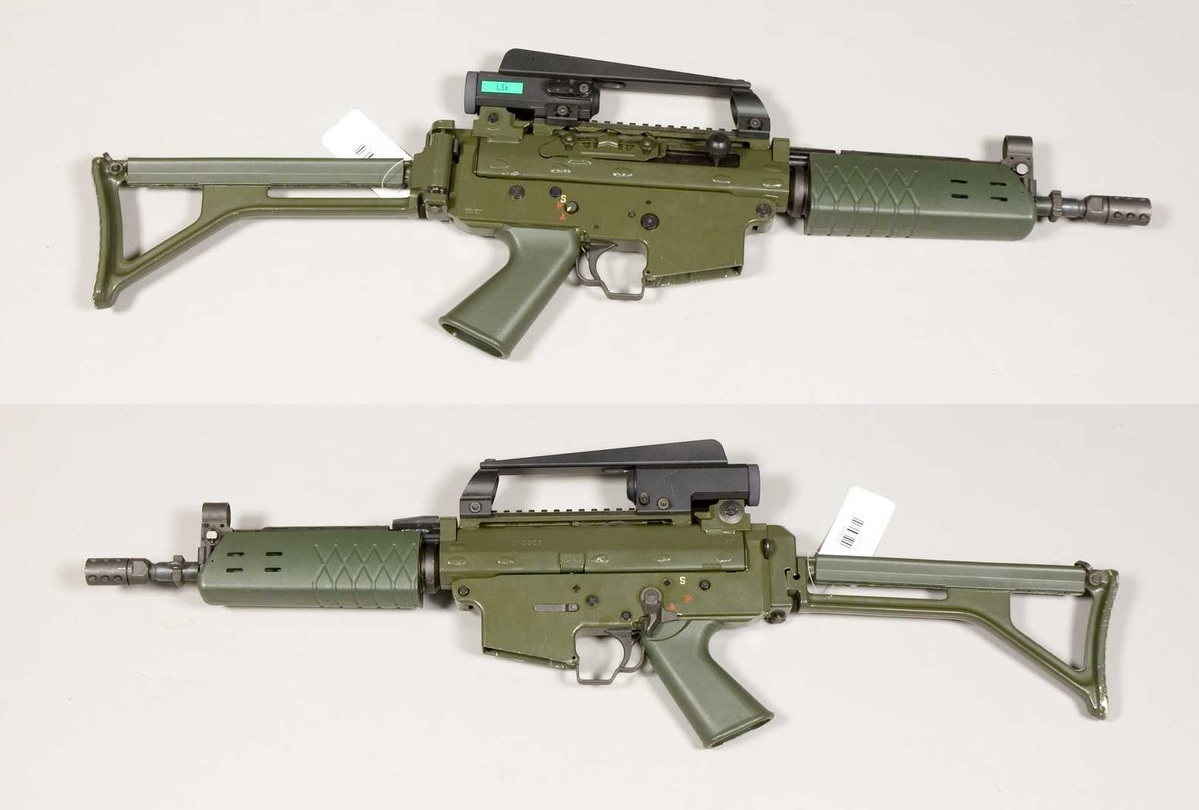
The Ak 5D with its magazine removed

The Ak 5D has a shortened barrel and handguard. It also features the MIL-STD-1913 rail system for easy mounting of a variety of sights.

Due to the smaller dimensions of the carbine, the Ak 5D is especially suited for ranger/urban warfare units and vehicle crews who often benefit from a more lightweight and compact weapon when taking into account the nature of their assignments and the environments in which they often operate. The Swedish Police have used a version of the Ak 5D; see below.

The newest Ak 5D Mk2 version has the same upgrades as the "C" model but retains the shorter barrel.

=== CGA5P ===
Some units of the Swedish Police have used a special version of the Ak 5D called CGA5P or sometimes (incorrectly) Ak 5DP. Essentially it is a black (instead of the regular military green) Ak 5D with automatic fire capability disabled by a hex screw, which can be removed if automatic fire is needed. Unlike the Ak 5D, the police version has fixed sights but is still equipped with the MIL-STD-1913 rail system to allow the use of telescopic sights or red dot sights. Unlike its military counterparts (except for the Ak 5C/D versions), the police version has safety catches on both sides of the weapon.

== Users ==
- Norway: Norwegian Police
- Sweden: Service rifle of the Swedish Armed Forces since 1987.

== See also ==
- Pindad SS1 - Indonesian assault rifle also derived from the FNC.
