= Automatkarbin 24 =

Swedish assault rifle

- Type: Assault rifle
- Place of origin: Finland

Service history
- In service: 2025–present
- Used by: See Users

Production history
- Manufacturer: SAKO
- Unit cost: SEK45,000 per unit in 2025
- Produced: 2024–present
- No. built: 1,400 (as of 2024)
- Variants: Automatkarbin 24A; Automatkarbin 24B

Specifications
- Mass: 3.2 kg (7.05 lb) empty
- Length: 714 mm (28.1 in) (Ak 24A); 800 mm (31.5 in) (Ak 24B)
- Barrel length: 292 mm (11.5 in) (Ak 24A); 368 mm (14.5 in) (Ak 24B)
- Cartridge: 5.56×45mm NATO
- Action: Gas-operated, short-stroke piston, closed rotating bolt
- Feed system: 30-round detachable STANAG magazine
- Sights: Rödpunktsikte 18 EHV B (Aimpoint Comp M5)

The Ak 24 (Swedish: Automatkarbin 24, lit. 'Automatic carbine 24') is the Swedish version of the Finnish Sako ARG 40 assault rifle, modified primarily to suit Swedish conditions.

== History ==
=== Initial procurement ===
Since at least 2012 it was widely recognised that the ageing Automatkarbin 5C rifles in service were in urgent need of replacement.

As part of the broader Nordic defence cooperation, Finland and Sweden signed a framework agreement in April 2021 to exchange information regarding future procurements of soldiers’ personal equipment. This was followed in September by an arrangement for joint procurement, and an implementation document was signed in December of the same year.

In spring 2023, the Swedish Armed Forces, together with the Finnish Defence Forces who were also seeking to replace their Cold War-era rifles, signed a contract with Finnish firearms manufacturer SAKO to supply their respective armed forces with firearms from the new Sako ARG family, which had entered production just one year earlier.

The Ak 24 was initially designated as the SSV 24 (Swedish: Självskyddsvapen 24, lit. 'Personal defence weapon 24'), which was later changed to avoid confusion with PDWs.

=== Adoption ===
As the new standard service rifle of the Swedish Armed Forces, it will gradually replace the Automatkarbin 5 and Automatkarbin 4 from 2025 onwards.

The rifle was first delivered to the Swedish Armed Forces in December 2024 and was adopted by conscripts at the Norrland Dragoon Regiment in January 2025. The rifle has been reported as a significant improvement over the Ak 5 and was praised for its overall balance, lightness, good ergonomics, and ease of use.

=== Temporary withdrawal ===
However, two months later, the newly introduced firearm was temporarily withdrawn from service after training instructors reported a delay between the trigger being pressed and the weapon firing, raising serious concerns about both safety and usability.

An investigation to uncover the root cause was immediately launched, and was reportedly linked to the production rifles, as the initial experimental versions did not exhibit the same problem.

In November 2025, the suspension of user trials was partially lifted, and trials resumed after a tolerance error in the production rifles had been identified and corrected. Deliveries are expected to resume in the second quarter of 2026.

== Design ==
The Ak 24 and its variants are lightweight, gas-operated firearms chambered in 5.56×45mm NATO calibre, featuring magazine-fed systems that utilise short-stroke pistons and closed rotating bolts.

The Ak 24 have a select-fire mechanism with semi-automatic and fully automatic modes, operated by a two-stage trigger requiring 2.5–3.5 kg (5.51–7.72 lb) of pressure to fire.

The firearm's variants differ in length. The Automatkarbin 24A features a short 292 millimetres (11.5 in) barrel designed for officers, while the Automatkarbin 24B has a longer 368 millimetres (14.5 in) barrel intended for general use by other service members.

== Users ==
- Sweden: 90,000 units to be delivered.
  - Swedish Armed Forces
  - Swedish Police Authority
  - Swedish Coast Guard

== Sources ==
- Puolustusvoimat (3 September 2021). "Finland and Sweden signed an Arrangement regarding weapons systems". puolustusvoimat.fi.
- FMV (27 March 2023a). "Nya eldhandvapen". Swedish Defence Materiel Administration (in Swedish).
- FMV (20 November 2023b). "Nya eldhandvapen" (PDF). Swedish Defence Materiel Administration (in Swedish).
- Försvarsmakten (29 November 2023). "Nya eldhandvapen – införandeledare är utsedd". forsvarsmakten.se (in Swedish). Archived from the original on 30 November 2023.
- Häggblom, Robin (7 July 2024). "SSV 24 is Dead, Long Live AK 24". corporalfrisk.com.
- Claesson, Helene (5 August 2024). "Här är nya AK 24". reservofficerarna.se (in Swedish).
- Taktisk (14 October 2024). "Hur ligger läget med den nya utrustningen?". taktisk.se (in Swedish).
- FMV (30 October 2024). "Leverans av automatkarbin 24 till Försvarsmakten". fmv.se (in Swedish).
- TFB (7 January 2025). "The Swedish Automatkarbin 24 (Ak 24) - A Detailed Summary". thefirearmblog.com.
- Folkesson, Ida (23 January 2025). "K 4 först ut att tilldelas nya vapnen: "Kommer bli jättestor förändring"". forsvarsmakten.se (in Swedish).
- Owetz, Josefine (13 March 2025). "Skjutförbud på nya AK 24 – problem med fördröjd avfyrning". officerstidningen.se (in Swedish).
- DN (12 March 2025). "Försvarets nya automatkarbiner får inte användas". dn.se (in Swedish). Dagens Nyheter.
- BDR (21 November 2025). Swedish AK 24 Shooting Ban Lifted: Trials Resume After 7 Months (Video). Baltic Defence Review.
- Ericson, Adrian (27 November 2025). "Polisen vill byta ut MP5 mot AK24". Polistidningen (in Swedish).
- Popenker, Maxim (2026). "Sako ARG, Automatkarbin 24 / AK 24 rifle (Finland)". modernfirearms.net.
- Brännström, Leif (15 May 2026). "Kustbevakningen beväpnar sig mot drönarattacker på Östersjön". Expressen (in Swedish).
