= FN FNC =

Belgian assault rifle

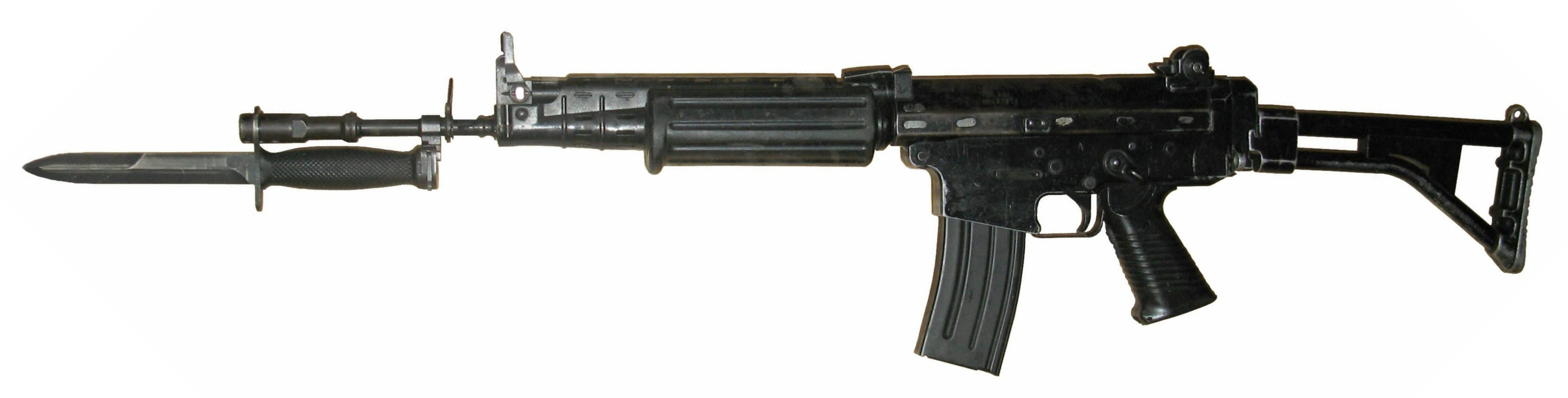
- FNC rifle with a bayonet
- Type: Assault rifle
- Place of origin: Belgium

Service history
- In service: 1979–present
- Used by: See Users
- Wars: Aceh Insurgency; Sri Lankan Civil War; The Troubles; Tuareg rebellion (1990–1995); Somali Civil War; War in Afghanistan (2001–2021); Conflict in the Niger Delta; 2007 Lebanon conflict Libyan Civil War; Russo-Ukrainian War

Production history
- Designer: FN Herstal
- Designed: 1975–1977
- Manufacturer: FN Herstal; Carl Gustafs Stads Gevärsfaktori; PT Pindad
- Produced: 1979–2004
- Variants: See Variants

Specifications
- Mass: Rifle: 3.840 kg (8.47 lb); Carbine: 3.7 kg (8.2 lb)
- Length: Rifle: 997 mm (39.3 in) stock extended / 766 mm (30.2 in) stock folded Carbine: 911 mm (35.9 in) stock extended / 667 mm (26.3 in) stock folded
- Barrel length: Rifle: 450 mm (17.7 in) (rifle); Carbine: 363 mm (14.3 in)
- Width: 70 mm (2.8 in) stock extended 75 mm (3.0 in) stock folded
- Height: 238 mm (9.4 in)
- Cartridge: 5.56×45mm NATO
- Action: Gas-operated long-stroke piston, rotating bolt
- Rate of fire: Approx. 700 rounds/min
- Muzzle velocity: M193: 965 m/s (3,166 ft/s); SS109: 925 m/s (3,034.8 ft/s)
- Effective firing range: 250–400 m sight adjustments
- Maximum firing range: 450 m (492 yd)
- Feed system: 30-round detachable STANAG box magazine (standard issue) or other STANAG magazines
- Sights: Rear flip aperture, front post 513 mm (20.2 in) sight radius (standard rifle)

The FN FNC (French: Fabrique Nationale Carabine) is a 5.56×45mm NATO assault rifle developed by the Belgian arms manufacturer FN Herstal and introduced in the late 1970s.

== Development ==
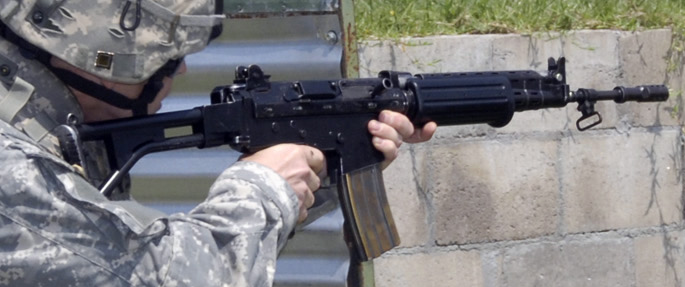
US Army infantryman firing an FNC at a target during a stress shoot

The FNC was developed between 1975 and 1977 for NATO standardization trials, as a less expensive alternative to the M16 rifle. The rifle's design is based on the FNC 76 prototype, a deep rework and simplification from the first FN 5,56x45 weapon, the commercially unsuccessful FN CAL rifle. The FNC 76 was soon withdrawn from the NATO competition after performing poorly due to its rushed development.

The first state to adopt the finalized FNC 80 was Indonesia, which purchased approximately 10,000 rifles in 1982 for its air force. The Indonesian government later acquired a license to permit Indonesian firm PT Pindad to manufacture the rifle for all branches of the armed forces, as the Pindad SS1 and Pindad SS2.

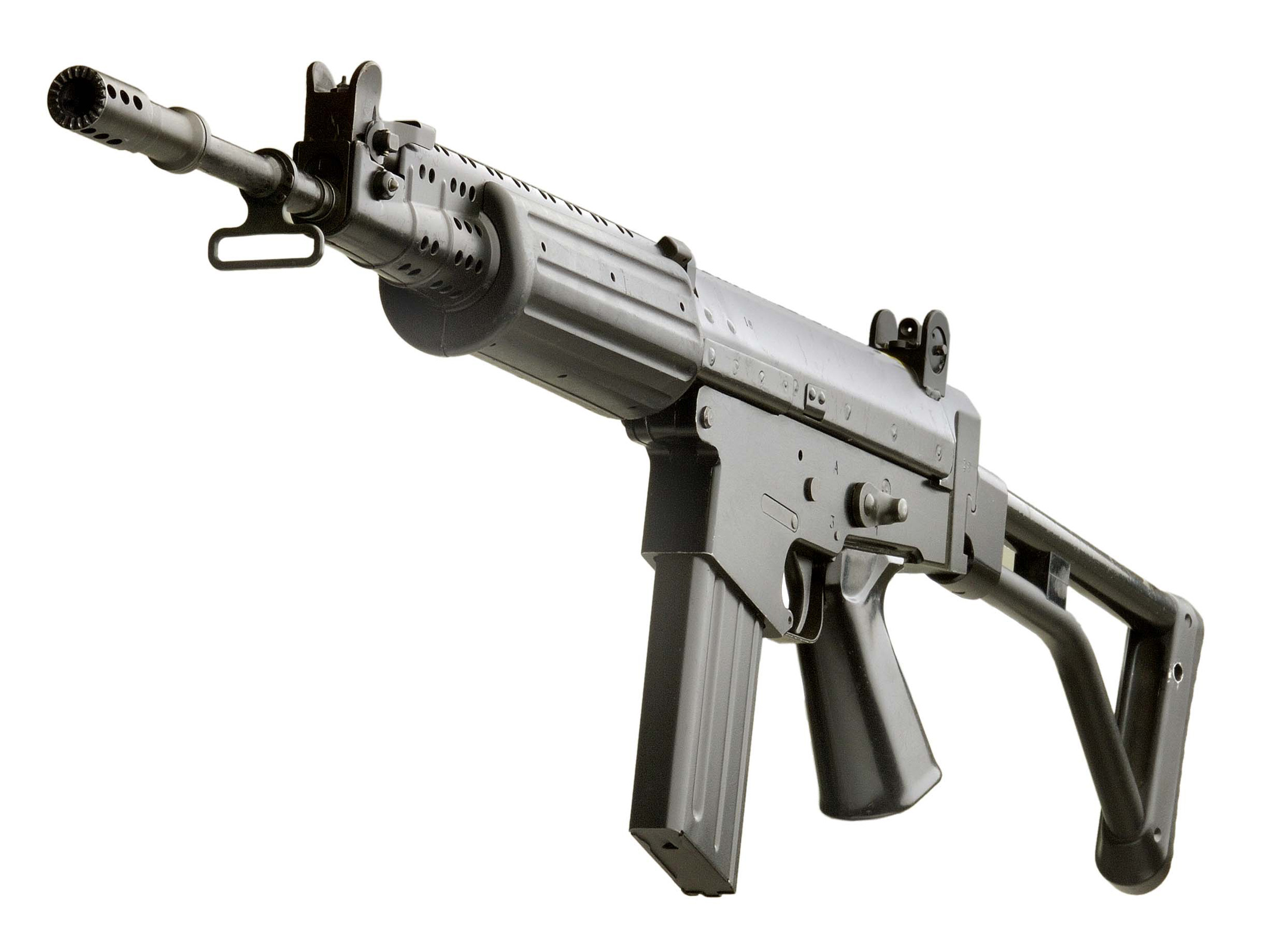

Trials for the Swedish Armed Forces were held between 1981 and 1982, using the finalized FNC 80 that proved the utility and efficiency of the design, impressing both the Swedish military and Belgian Army staff back at home. Sweden adopted a version of the FNC for domestic production in 1986, naming it the Automatkarbin 5. Slightly modified, it remains the main service rifle of the Swedish Armed Forces until replaced with automatkarbin 24.

The FNC 80 was finally adopted by the Belgian Armed Forces in 1989, as a service-wide replacement for the 7.62×51mm NATO FN FAL, after having been issued in small numbers to airborne infantry units for several years.

The rifle is also used as a service rifle by the armed forces of Tonga, a microstate in the Pacific Ocean.

== Design details ==
=== Operating mechanism ===
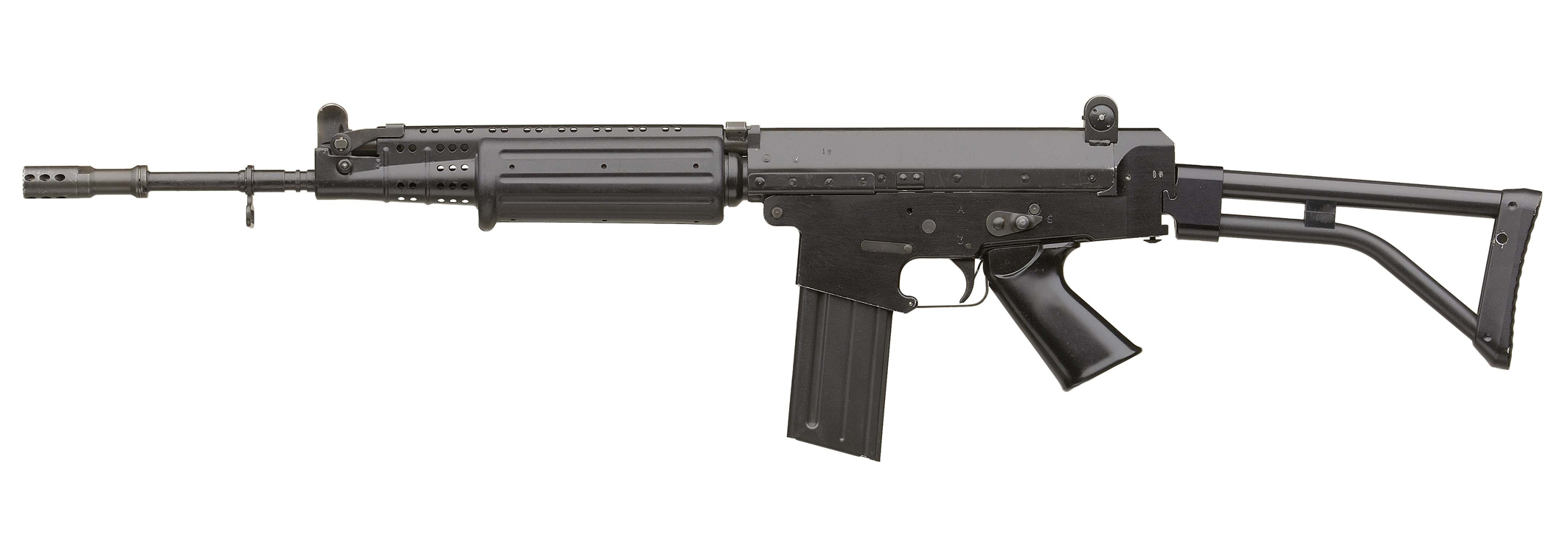
FNC 76 Left side, selector switch visible.

The FNC is a selective fire weapon that uses a gas-operated long-stroke piston system and a rotating bolt locking mechanism equipped with two locking lugs that engage corresponding recesses in the barrel extension. The bolt is rotated and unlocked by the interaction of the bolt's cam pin with a camming guide contained in the bolt carrier. Overall, the mechanism strongly resembles that of Kalashnikov rifles, but adapted to more advanced design and production methods. The rear part of the cocking handle slot, cut in the upper receiver for the cocking handle, is covered by a spring-loaded cover which automatically opens by the handle when it goes back and automatically closes the opening when the cocking handle returns forward.

=== Features ===
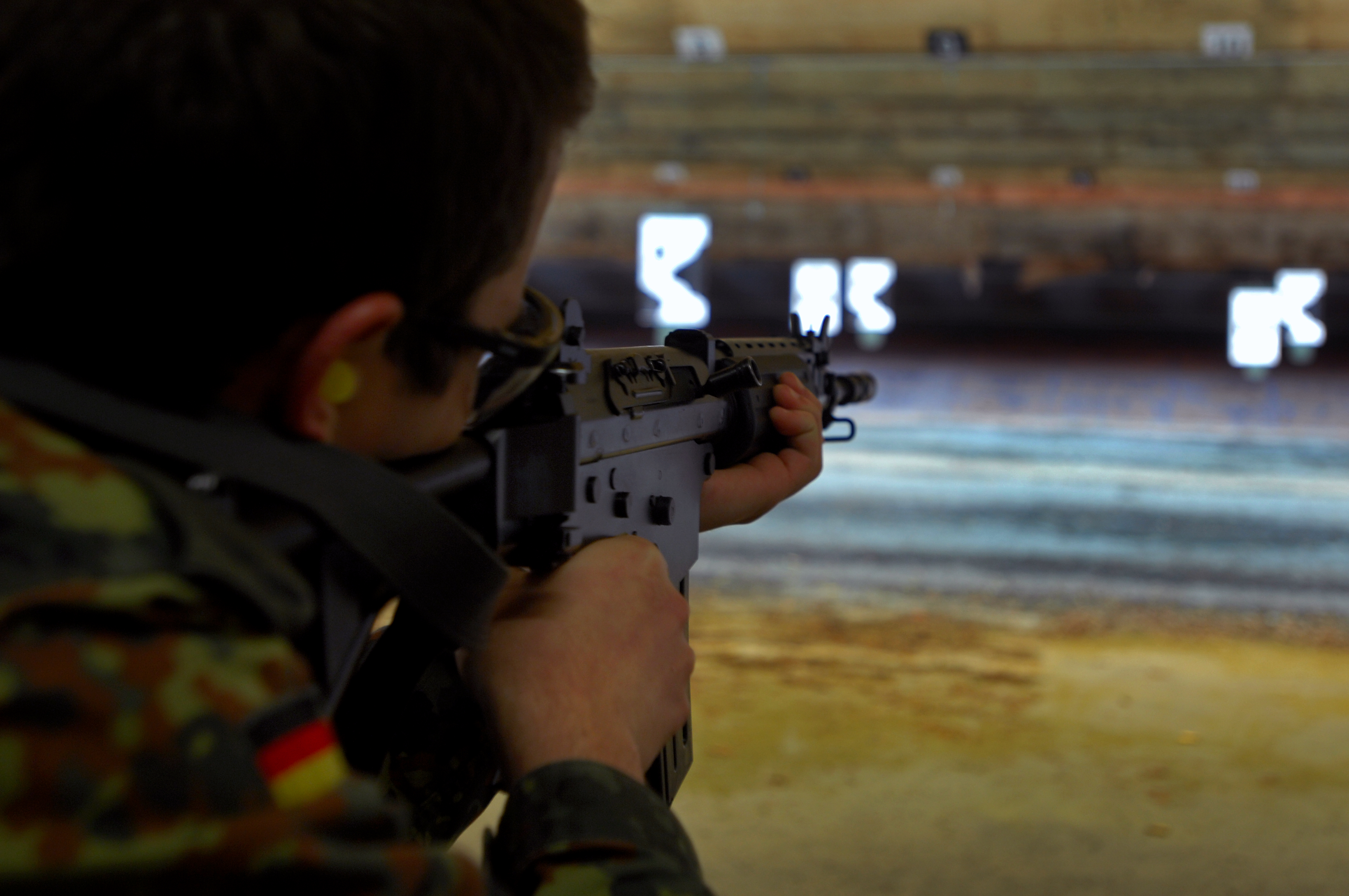
A German soldier aims an FN FNC during a Belgian/German weapons qualification at Ramstein Air Base, Germany, 2009.

The spring extractor is located inside the bolt head, the ejector is fixed and riveted to the inside of the receiver housing. The FNC uses a 2-position gas valve, a hammer-type firing mechanism and a trigger with a fire selector switch that is simultaneously the manual safety, securing the weapon from accidental firing. The selector lever is located on the left side of the receiver and has 4 settings: "S" - weapon safe, "1" - single fire mode, "3" - 3-round burst, "A" - continuous (automatic) fire.

The FNC's barrel features a flash suppressor that is also used to launch NATO standard 22mm rifle grenades (only the standard rifle model has this capability). The gas block contains a gas valve setting that is used to isolate the gas system, providing an increased volume of propellant required to fire a rifle grenade. The sheet-metal gas valve switch when pulled upright, acts as a V-notch sight used for aiming the rifle grenades. The piston head and extension, as well as the gas port block, barrel bore and chamber, are hard-chrome plated to minimize the effects of propellant fouling.

The rifle feeds from 30-round steel magazines that are interchangeable with magazines from the American M16 rifle (STANAG 4179 compliant). After the last round is fired, the bolt will remain closed as there is no provision for an automatic bolt hold open. However there is a manual locking possibility by engaging à notch in the receiver by pulling the charging knob in. FNC magazines will function in AR-15/M16-type rifles.

The plastic-coated, lightweight alloy skeleton stock folds to the right side of the receiver. A fixed synthetic (polyamide) buttstock is also available.

The upper receiver is made from stamped steel, the lower receiver, along with magazine housing, is made from machined aluminum alloy.

=== Sights ===
The rifle has a flip-type L-shaped windage-adjustable rear sight with two apertures with settings for 250 m (273 yd) and 400 m (437 yd), while the front sight post is adjustable for elevation. Optics such as the Hensoldt 4× telescopic sight can be attached with the use of a receiver-mounted adapter.

=== Accessories ===
Standard equipment supplied with the FNC includes a spike bayonet or a variant of the American M7 blade bayonet (with the use of a lug adapter) and a sling. The rifle can be deployed with a barrel mounted bipod and blank-firing adaptor.

== Variants ==
The FNC was produced in two primary configurations: a standard rifle and short (carbine) length. The "Standard" Model 2000 rifle and the "Short" Model 7000 carbine are equipped with barrels with 6 right-hand grooves and a 178 mm (1:7 in) rifling twist rate used to stabilize the longer and heavier Belgian SS109 bullet. The Model 0000 rifle and Model 6000 carbine use a slower 305 mm (1:12 in) twist rate for the shorter and lighter American M193 bullet.

Fabrique Nationale also offers semi-automatic-only Civilian and Law Enforcement carbine versions: the short Model 7030 with a 178 mm (1:7 in) rifling twist and the Model 6040 with a 305 mm (1:12 in) twist rate. These single-fire carbines feature a 410 mm (16.1 in) barrel and are also capable of firing rifle grenades and mounting a bayonet.

=== Sweden ===
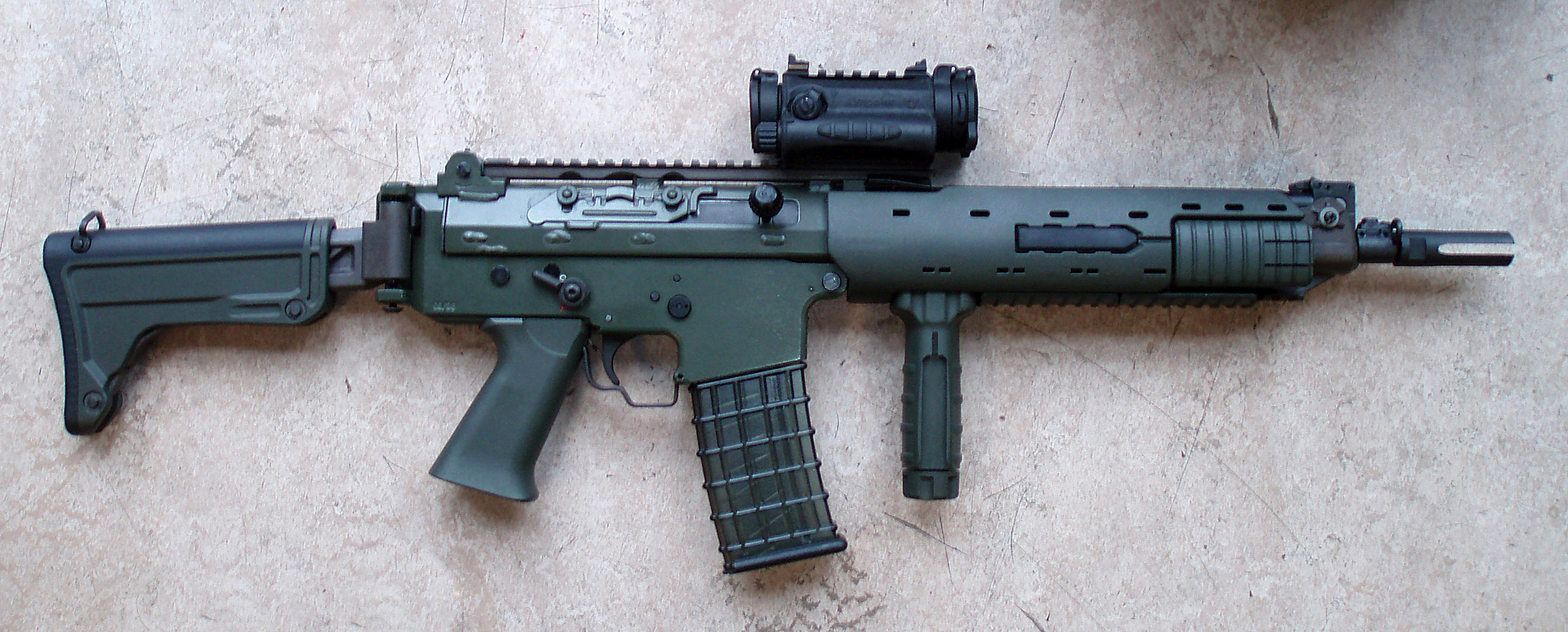
The Ak 5C represents the latest Swedish evolution of the FNC.

The Swedish service rifle built by Carl Gustafs stads gevärsfaktori (then part of FFV and currently BAE Systems Bofors) is a modernized Model 2000 rifle without the 3-round burst fire control setting. It was accepted into service in 1986 as the Ak 5 after extensive trials and receiving several modifications and replaced the 7.62mm Automatkarbin 4 (a licensed version of the Heckler & Koch G3). Bofors has produced several variants of the basic Ak 5: the Ak 5B (equipped with a British 4× SUSAT optical sight but no mechanical iron sights), the Ak 5C (a modular variant designed for compatibility with various accessories), and the Ak 5D (a compact variant for vehicle crews and rangers).

=== Indonesia ===
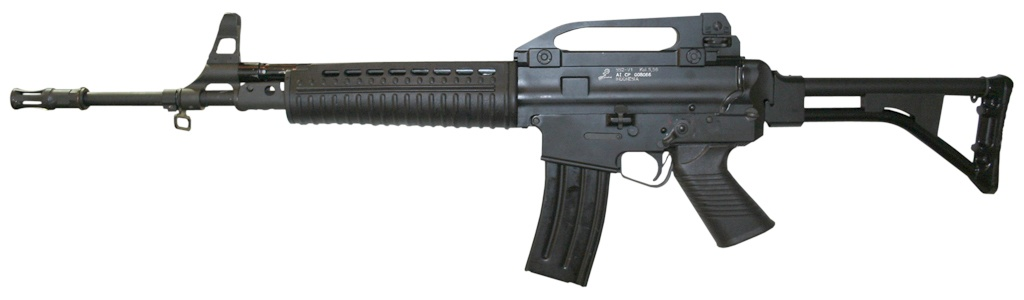
The Pindad SS2-V1 represents the latest Indonesian evolution of the FNC.

In Indonesia, a modified version of the FNC, produced under license as the Pindad SS1 with adaptations for jungle climate conditions, is used as the standard rifle of the Indonesian National Armed Forces. A Paramilitary variant of the SS1 created for police use exists as the V1-V2 used by the Korps Sabhara chambered in 7.62×45mm Pindad. This cartridge is a necked-up version of the 5.56×45mm cartridge, utilizing a round-nose bullet similar to the .30 Carbine and was created by Pindad for urban warfare/close quarter combat. The Pindad SS2 is an updated version of the Pindad SS1. SS2 rifles have been phased into service since 2006 in the Indonesian military and police in order to gradually replace the SS1 rifles which were in service from the 1990s. Another variant, the SS Blackout-V1 exists in the .300 Blackout caliber.

== Users ==
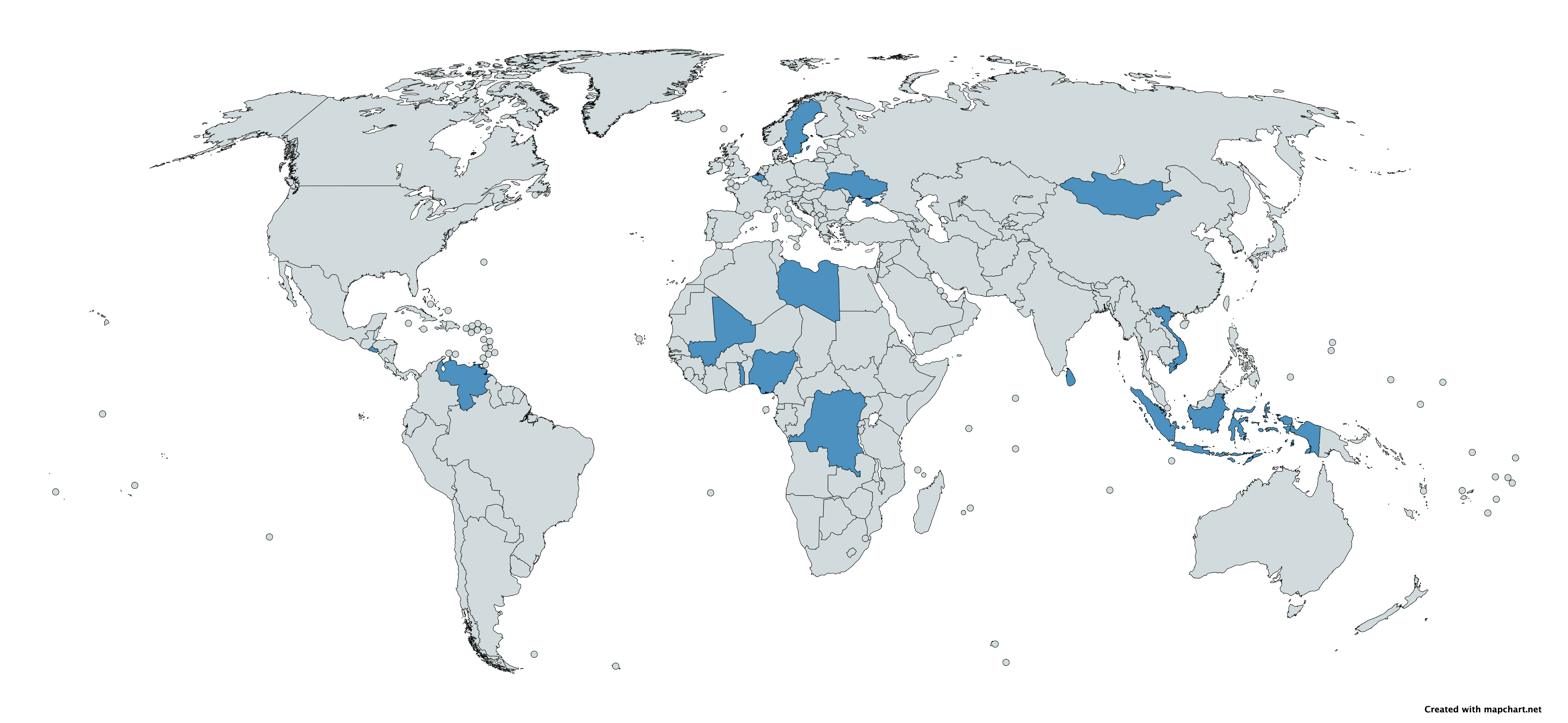
A map with FNC users in blue

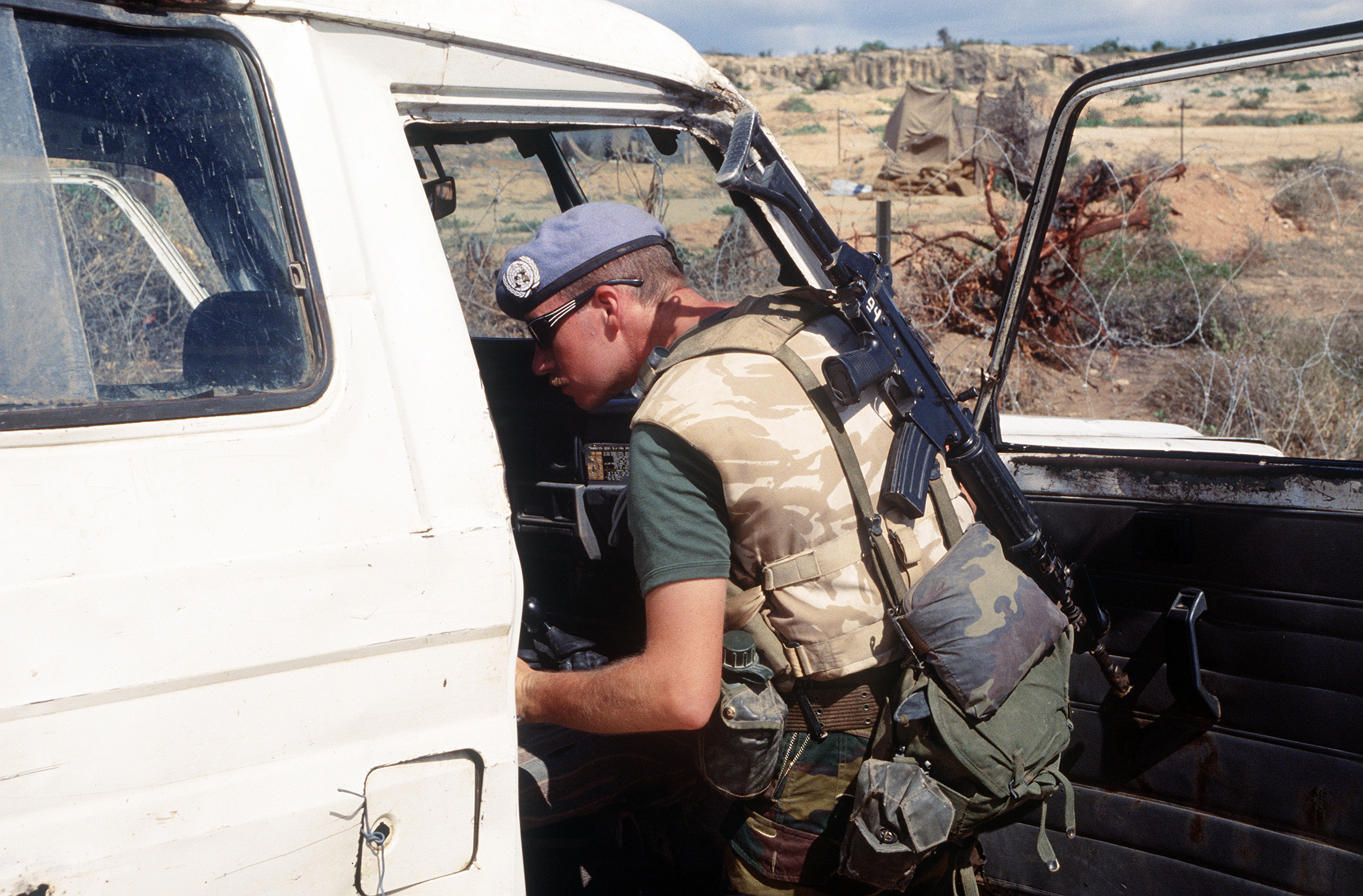
A Belgian soldier conducting traffic inspections in Somalia in 1993, part of the multinational Unified Task Force.

- Belgium: Previous standard rifle of the Belgian Land Component; used in both the standard and carbine variants (called the FNC M2 and FNC M3 respectively); replaced by the FN SCAR-L.
- Democratic Republic of Congo
- El Salvador
- Federal Republic of Yugoslavia: Used in unknown quantities by Special Operations Unit (Serbia)
- Indonesia: Purchased 10,000 rifles in 1982. Now made under license as the Pindad SS1.
- Libya
- Mali: People's Movement for the Liberation of Azawad
- Mongolia
- Nigeria
- Sri Lanka
- Sweden: Accepted for use in 1986 and manufactured under license by Bofors Carl Gustaf as the Ak 5 (Automatkarbin 5).
- Timor Leste: Used by special units of the National Police of East Timor.
- Tonga: Standard service rifle of the Tongan military.
- Ukraine: Received as military aid from Belgium reserve during the Russo-Ukrainian War.
- Venezuela
- Vietnam: Use in Military Marksman Demonstration Team.

=== Non-state users ===
- Free Aceh Movement
- Provisional Irish Republican Army

== See also ==
- FN SCAR, multi-calibre and multi-role successor

== Bibliography ==
- Crawford, Steve (2003). Twenty-first Century Small Arms: The World's Great Infantry Weapons. St. Paul, MN: Zenith Imprint. ISBN 978-0-7603-1503-3.
- Walter, John (2006). Rifles of the World (3rd ed.). Iola, WI: Krause Publications. ISBN 978-0-89689-241-5.
