= Carl Gustafs stads gevärsfaktori =

Swedish firearms manufacturer

- Industry: Armaments
- Founded: 1812; 214 years ago
- Defunct: 2005; 21 years ago
- Headquarters: Eskilstuna, Sweden

Carl Gustafs stads gevärsfaktori (English: rifle factory of Carl Gustaf's Town) was a Swedish firearms manufacturer based in Eskilstuna, Sweden.

== History ==
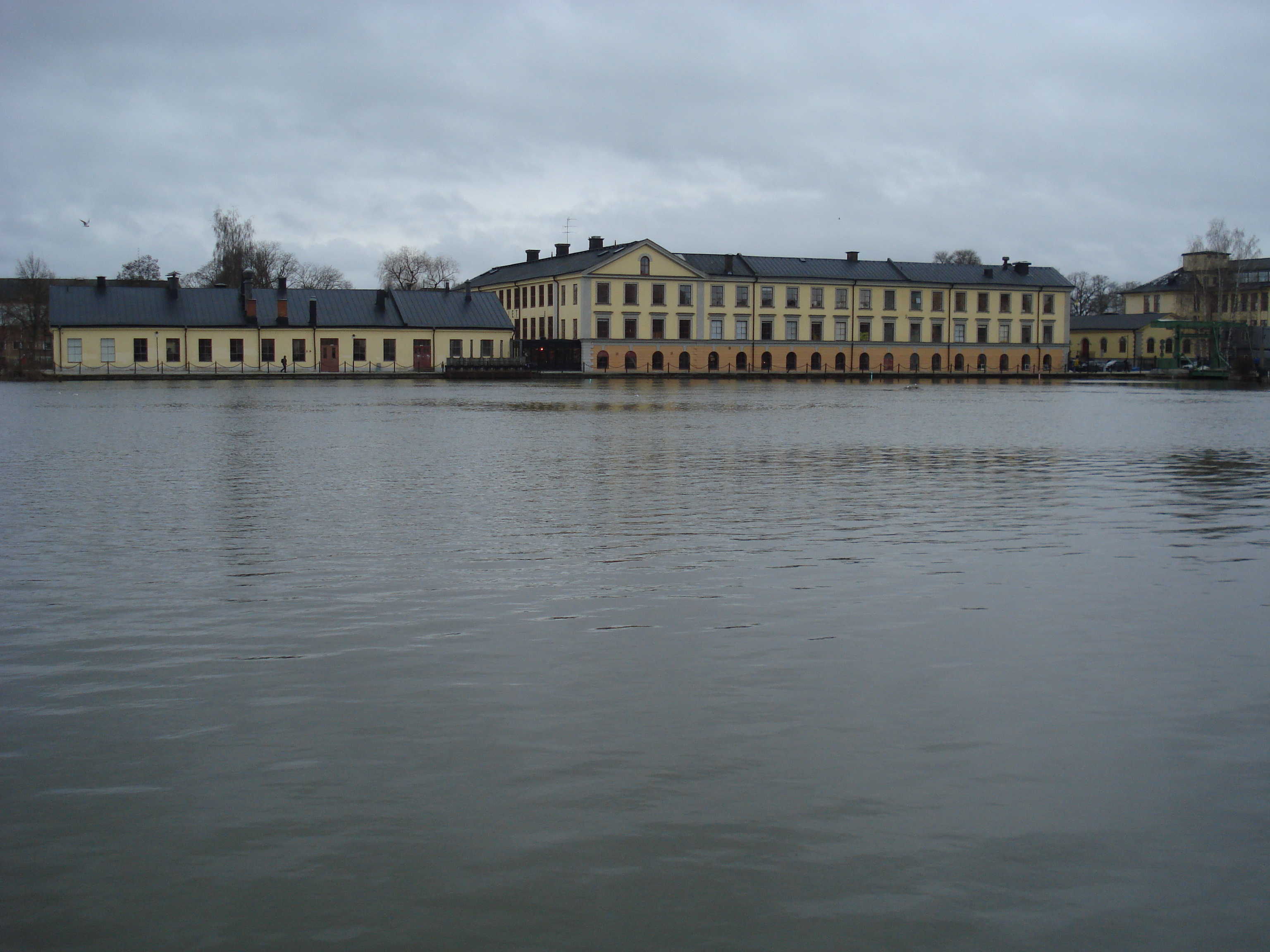
Eskilstuna factory in 2010

Carl Gustafs stads gevärsfaktori ("rifle factory of Carl Gustaf's Town") was founded in 1812 as a state-owned arsenal. The name "Carl Gustaf's Town" was used intermittently for the town of Eskilstuna after King Karl X Gustav gave the town city privileges.

Between 1943 and 1991, the factory was run by the state agency sv:Försvarets Fabriksverk (FFV), and the whole complex was often referred to as FFV-Carl Gustaf.

In 1970, the Husqvarna Group sold its firearms manufacturing division, Husqvarna Vapenfabriks Aktiebolag, to FFV. FFV-Carl Gustaf continued to manufacture the Husqvarna 1900 hunting rifle and also developed that firearm into the Carl Gustaf 2000 series.

In 1999, Saab AB purchased the Celsius Group, the then parent company of FFV-Carl Gustaf. In September 2000, United Defense Industries (UDI) of the United States acquired Bofors Weapons Systems (the heavy weapons division), while Saab retained the missile interests.

BAE Systems acquired UDI and its Bofors subsidiary in 2005, and BAE Systems Bofors is now a business unit of BAE Systems AB; Saab Bofors Dynamics is a unit of Saab AB.

=== Products ===
Along with Husqvarna Vapenfabrik, Carl Gustafs stads gevärsfaktori has provided the Swedish Army with small arms for over two centuries. There have been both foreign designs, such as the Remington M1867 rolling block and the Swedish Mauser rifles, as well as domestic designs such as the Ag m/42 semi-automatic rifle and the Kpist m/45 submachine gun.

In addition Bofors Carl Gustaf have produced a number of other weapons such as the m/42 Carl Gustaf 20mm recoilless rifle, the 20 mm m/45 autocannon and the famed 84 mm Carl Gustaf 8.4cm recoilless rifle, still one of the most common anti-tank weapons in the world.

The NIVA XM1970 (Nytt Infanteri Vapen, "New infantry Weapon") was an experimental combined 5.56mm automatic rifle / 45mm recoilless rifle concept by FFV-Carl Gustaf during the early 1970s. It failed to attract any buyers and was abandoned. The NIVA or Nytt infanterivapen (New Infantry Weapon) program was primarily intended to replace the Ak 4 battle rifle that was then in service with the Swedish Army. It was apparently also simultaneously intended to act as a lower cost alternative to use of the Carl Gustaf 8.4cm recoilless rifle. The automatic rifle section was of bullpup configuration with the 45mm recoilless rifle overhead. At least two prototypes were built and tested. Ultimately however, the XM1970 was not adopted by the Swedish military.

The company also produced the standard Swedish Army weapon, the Ak 5 automatic rifle. The Ak 5 is a modified version of the Fabrique Nationale 5.56 mm carbine FN FNC, produced with a folding stock and an option to mount the SUSAT sight from the British SA80.
