= AOR M21 =

Greek assault rifle

- Type: Assault rifle Battle rifle (M21-7); Designated marksman rifle (M21-5 DMR Sniper)
- Place of origin: Greece

Service history
- Used by: Proposed to the Hellenic Army

Production history
- Designed: 2019
- Manufacturer: AOR
- Produced: 2020-Present
- No. built: Unknown

Specifications
- Cartridge: 5.56×45mm NATO; 7.62×51mm NATO
- Caliber: 5.56mm 7.62mm
- Feed system: 30 round STANAG magazine
- Sights: Iron

The AOR M21 is a Greek assault rifle developed by the AOR design team for the Hellenic Army, mainly to replace the aging G3.

== History ==
The design was started in September 2019 and completed by March 2020.

However, the pandemic started by this time meaning that the official presentation to the Army General Staff was in July 2020.

According to unconfirmed reports, the rifle has been observed to be in use with 1st Raider–Paratrooper Brigade (Greece) in 2021.

== Features ==
The AOR is available in two variants; the M21-5 which uses the 5.56×45mm NATO round, and the M21-7 which uses the 7.62×51mm NATO.

The rifle is made of durable metal alloys as well as plastics. Furthermore, the rifle has surface treatments such as phosphating to increase its durability, as well as anti-IR paint. The rifle features ambidextrous control levers for the magazine release and safety.

The legislation given by the state requires that the rifle is made completely in Greece.

== Variants ==
There are four sub-variants for the M21-5:

=== M21-5 CQB Carbine ===
Fitted with a 10.5 inch long barrel.

=== M21-5 Carbine ===
Fitted with a 14.5 inch barrel.

=== M21-5 Standard ===
Fitted with a 16-inch barrel.

=== M21-5 DMR Sniper rifle ===
Fitted with a 18-inch barrel.

== Adoption ==
Ultimately, the AOR M21 was not adopted.
