= Kbkm wz. 2003 =

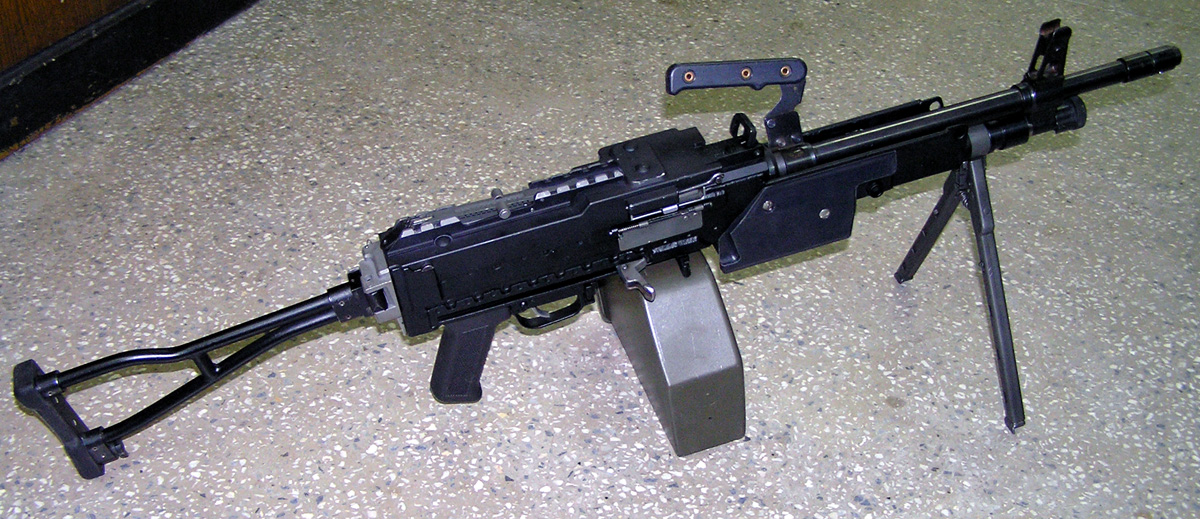
- 5,56 mm kbkm wz. 2003D
- Type: Light machine gun
- Place of origin: Poland

Production history
- Variants: kbkm wz. 2003S (standard), kbkm wz. 2003D (para model)

Specifications
- Mass: 7,53 kg (wz. 2003S); 7,29 kg (wz. 2003D)
- Length: 1099/829 mm (wz. 2003S); 979/709 mm (wz. 2003D)
- Barrel length: 500 mm (wz. 2003S); 380 mm (wz. 2003D)
- Cartridge: 5.56×45mm NATO
- Caliber: 5.56 mm
- Action: Gas-operated, rotating bolt
- Rate of fire: 650-1000 rounds/min
- Feed system: 200-round LGM-1 disintegrating M27 ammunition belt, 20/30-round magazines from kbs wz. 96

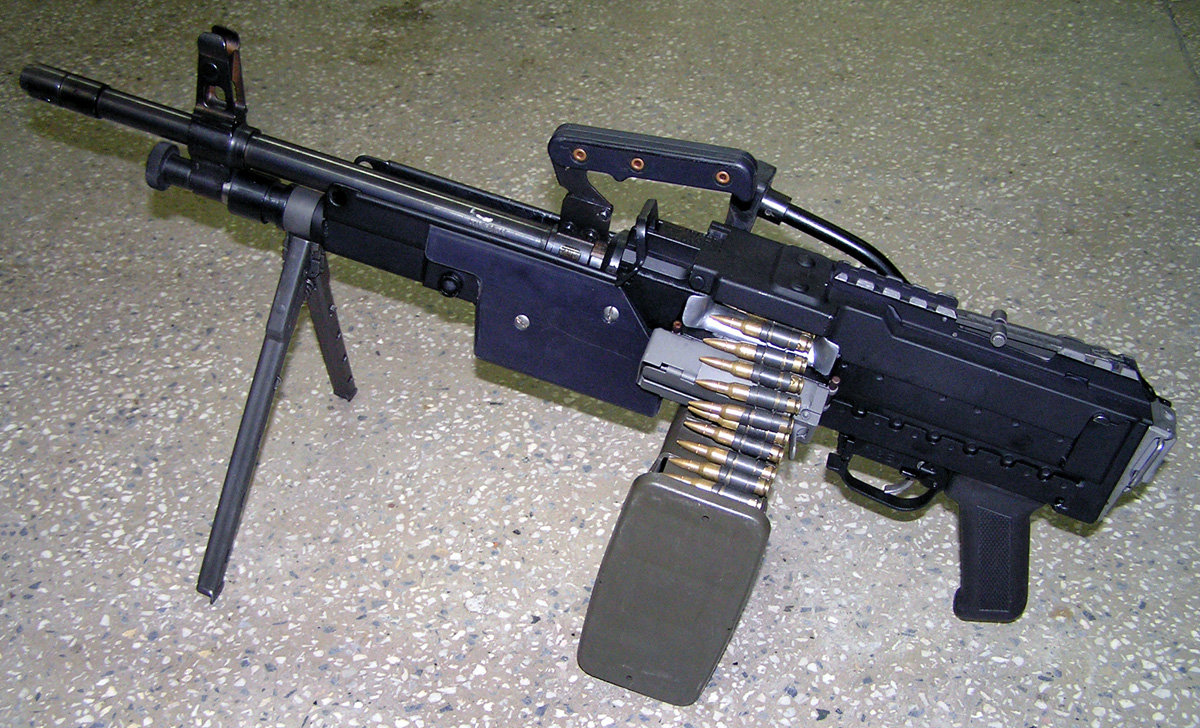
The Kbkm wz. 2003 with stock stowed.

The kbkm wz. 2003 (Polish: karabinek maszynowy wzór 2003, English: machine carbine pattern 2003) is a light machine gun of Polish origin, designed in the early 2000s to replace the 7.62×54mmR PKM series of support weapons. The construction if fully compatible with all NATO standards. There were 2 versions developed of this gun: kbkm. 2003S - standard version and kbkm. 2003D - version for airborne or assault units with shorter barrel. Overall it was put into tests and not purchased by the Polish Army.
