= Pindad SS1 =

Indonesian assault rifle

Pindad SS1-V1
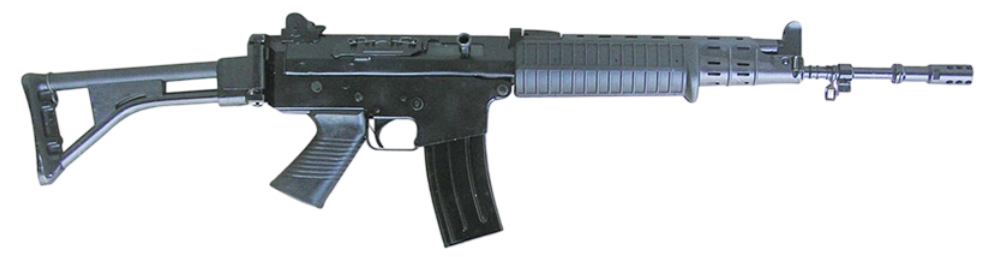
- Pindad SS1-V1 assault rifle
- Type: Assault rifle Semi-automatic rifle (SBC-1, SS1-C)
- Place of origin: Indonesia

Service history
- In service: 1991–present
- Used by: See Users
- Wars: Insurgency in Aceh; Papua conflict East Timor Conflict; Cambodian–Thai border stand-off Moro conflict 1997 Cambodian coup d'état Battle of Marawi; Operation Madago Raya

Production history
- Designer: Fabrique Nationale; Pindad
- Designed: 1975–2020
- Manufacturer: Pindad
- Produced: 1984–present
- Variants: See Variants

Specifications
- Mass: 4.01 kg (8.84 lb) (unloaded)
- Length: 997 mm (39.3 in) stock extended / 753 mm (29.6 in) stock folded
- Barrel length: 449 mm (17.7 in)
- Cartridge: 5.56×45mm NATO; 7.62×45mm (SB1 series)
- Action: Gas-Operated, rotating bolt
- Rate of fire: 600–650 rounds/min
- Muzzle velocity: 710 m/s
- Effective firing range: 450 m
- Feed system: Various STANAG magazines.
- Sights: Iron sights, but optical sights are possible if a mount is present. Optical sight is a standard feature in SS1-V4 variant.

The SS1 (short for Senapan Serbu 1, lit. 'Assault Rifle 1') is the standard assault rifle of the Indonesian armed forces and Indonesian National Police. It is based on the FN FNC rifle, but modified in order to meet ergonomic and tropical environment needs.

The assault rifle is a gas-operated automatic carbine with a foldable butt and is designed to meet NATO standards. The SS1 is a high performance light individual weapon that has been used by the Indonesian armed forces, including the Army, Navy, and Air Force, as well as police. It was adopted into Indonesian service in 1991.

It is currently being phased out and replaced by the Pindad SS2. The SS1 would possibly be used by reserve or paramilitary forces when the SS2 is fully adopted into service.

The SS1 is manufactured by PT Pindad, Bandung, Indonesia, under license from Fabrique Nationale, Belgium.

== History ==
In 1976 from experience gained in the field, an idea to create a new assault rifle to replace the existing standard issue Senapan Panjang lit. 'Long Rifle' or SP series battle rifle surfaced. In 1977 a prototype dubbed SS-77 (Senapan Serbu 1977) was born. The SS-77 assault rifle design and operating system were based on the ArmaLite AR-18, with a gas-operated, rotating bolt mechanism. It has a magazine capacity of 30 rounds chambered in 5.56x45 mm caliber with Safe-Semi-Auto firing modes. The SS-77 assault rifle design includes both a standard long-barreled version and a carbine (short-barreled) variant with a folding stock. In 1978, 150 prototypes with foldable stock were produced, of which 30 were sent to the Army Research and Development Service (Dislitbangad) for testing purposes.

In 1979, the SS-77 was further developed using 7.62x51mm ammunition, resulting in the SS-79 (Senapan Serbu 1979). The Indonesian Army (TNI AD) and the Department of Defense and Security (Dephankam) intended to adopt it as the standard infantry rifle, replacing the SP-1 as previously planned. However, due to considerations issued by the Agency for the Assessment and Application of Technology (BPPT) in 1982, the decision was not to produce it from scratch due to a lengthy timeframe and high research and development costs.

As a cost-saving and time-efficient approach, BPPT proposed licensing existing assault rifles that had already proven their durability and reliability in the field. During the initial evaluation, six types of assault rifles were considered: the German HK33, the American M16A1, the Belgian FNC, the Swiss SIG SG 540 (Note: The Army magazine specifically mentions "Sig G40" though it's possible it may have been a mistype of "SG 540"), the Austrian Steyr (Note: The Army magazine specifically mentions "Australia" though it's possible it may have been a mistype of "Austria"), and the Pietro Beretta AR70.

Under the order of the Chief of Staff of the Army in May 1978, the Commanding General (Danjen) of the Education and Training Development Command (Kobangdiklat) formed a trial team consisting of related elements, namely:

- Director of Research and Development of the Education and Training Development Command (Dirlitbang Kobangdiklat) as chairman
- Event activities (Lakgiat) carried out by: Col. Inf. Alex Suseno
- Infantry Center (Pussenif) from the Engineering Department: Major Inf. Pieter Hermanus
- Pindad from Head of the Weapons Development and Research Section (Kabanglitbangjat) and Military equipment (Almil): Major CPL. Sutartro
- Meanwhile, the troops were a Company of the Kostrad's 328th Airborne Battalion (Yonif 328 Linud Kostrad) with Battalion Commander Major Inf. Bambang Sembodo

The trials included:

- Ease of disassembling, and assembling weapons in the field
- Ease of lining up, formations, and marching
- Reliability combat tests in the field

The trial results are based on the assessment criteria and the assessment sequence is as follows:

1. HK33
2. M16A1
3. FNC
4. AR70
5. SG 540
6. Steyr

Then the possibility of further production in Pindad was evaluated.

From the test results, three strong candidates emerged: HK33, M16A1, and the FNC. While the HK33 was the top choice, its use of a delayed blowback system instead of a gas-operated mechanism (a requirement by Indonesia), complex and expensive technology, and certain components (especially the barrel) made local production unfeasible, certain components also have to be supplied from Germany especially rollers. Consequently, the adoption of HK33 was canceled.

The M16A1, which was favored by the troops for its light weight was the second candidate, faced stringent requirements. These included importing ammunition, main mechanical system components, and barrels directly from the United States. In 1977, the Government of Indonesia (GOI) aimed to transform the Indonesian Army Military Industries (Pindad) Small Arms Factory in Bandung into a co-production facility for M16A1 rifles. Both Colt Industries and Lockheed Aircraft Corporation submitted proposals. By 13 December 1977, the Defense Security Assistance Agency (DSAA) was processing Colt's request for an export license. At year’s end, the DSAA awaited contract details to draft a Memorandum of Understanding for approval by the Secretary of State and Congress. On 23 August 1978, Indonesia invited the US to negotiate regarding the use of the weapon. As a result, the US said that Indonesia could only produce 150,000 M16A1s, and not all components could be made in Indonesia, such as the trigger housing, munitions, upper and lower mechanical housings, and barrel. Consequently, the adoption of the M16A1 was canceled.

Ultimately, the FNC (the third candidate) was chosen and officially became the modern infantry assault rifle used by the entire Indonesian National Armed Forces. The decision to select the FNC was influenced by the ease of technology transfer offered by the principal manufacturer, FN Herstal SA from Belgium, which agreed to provide up to 100% technology transfer. With FNC, all technology is given, starting from the smallest down to the production machines, so that true technology transfer can be achieved.

Another key consideration was that the FNC assault rifle had already adopted a 7-inch barrel and used SS-109 ammunition (full metal jacket) as per NATO standards. Subsequently, in February 1983, BPPT, representing the Indonesian government, reached an agreement with FN Herstal SA of Belgium. As part of the deal, PT Pindad was required to produce a minimum of 200,000 FNC rifles. After meeting this requirement, no further royalties needed to be paid to the principal. Initially, the TNI imported these assault rifles directly from Belgium. It wasn’t until 1984 that production began at the PT Pindad factory in Kiara Condong, Bandung, Indonesia, after completing all necessary preparations. The officially designated name for this assault rifle became SS-1 (Senapan Serbu 1). According to the agreement, FN Herstal agreed to finance the repair and retrofit program of existing 20,000 FNCs that had issues which were already purchased by Dephankam.

After 10,000 FN FNC rifles were bought for the Indonesian military, Pindad secured a license in 1984 from FN to manufacture the FNC. Indonesia adopted the SS1s into official service by 1991.

A 2009 seizure of Pindad SS1 rifles alongside P2 pistols in the Philippines has led to a special investigation on Pindad on whether weapon smuggling took place. The Indonesian government, in response, made preparations to form a special agency to handle all overseas trade. The Ministry of State Enterprises conducted an investigation against Pindad over the seizure of its firearms.

== Design ==
The external looks of the SS1s are strongly similar to the FN FNC, ranging from the pistol grip to the stock, receiver and barrel. Optics can be mounted onto the SS1 rifles, but a special optic mount must be installed first.

The SS1s are designed by Pindad to allow for the use of their own SPG-1A underbarrel grenade launcher which patterned after the American M203, inserted underneath the barrel. Most SS1 rifle models, with the exception of the SBC-1, are made with selective fire modes that consist of single, three round burst and full auto firing modes.

== Variants ==
=== SS1-V1 ===
The V1 is the primary variant, and is most widely used by Indonesian regular infantry forces, with standard 449 mm (17.7 in) barrel and folding stock.

=== SS1-V2 ===
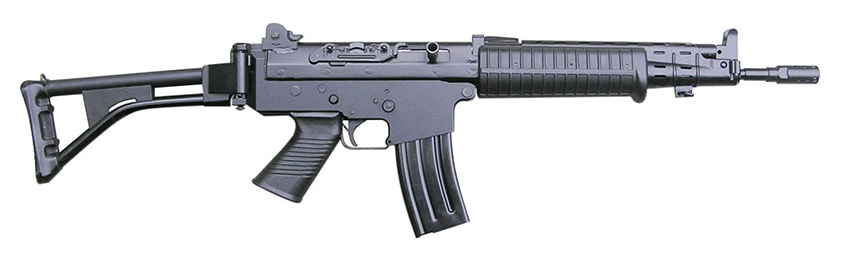
SS1-V2

The carbine variant with shorter 363 mm (14.3 in) barrel. Has overall length of 890 mm (35.0 in) and empty weight of 3.91 kg (8.62 lb).

=== SS1-V3 ===
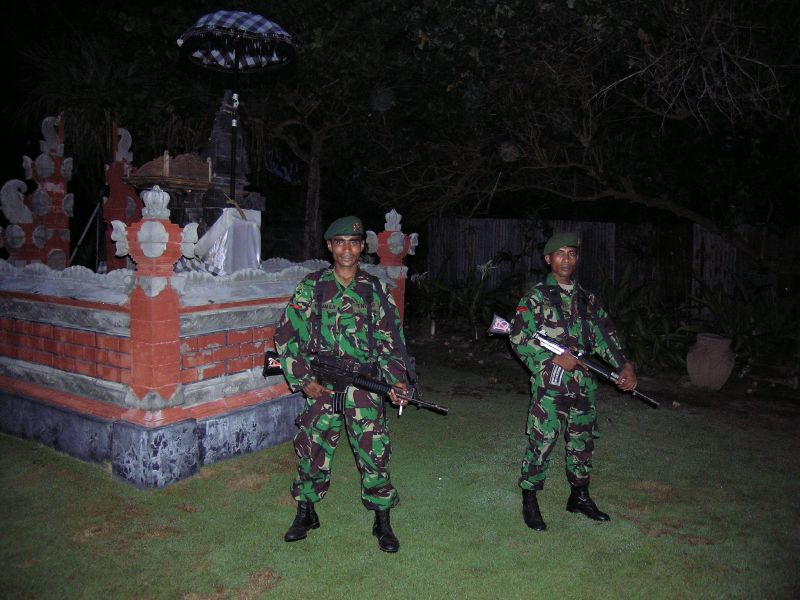
Two Indonesian Army guards in Bali equipped with SS1-V3

Standard 449 mm (17.7 in) barrel with fixed stock.

=== SS1-V4 ===
The designated marksman rifle variant similar to SS1-V1 except for the scope to extend the effective range during medium and long range firefights. Intended to be used similar in function to Dragunov Sniper Rifle.

=== SS1-V5 ===
The compact carbine variant of SS1 with a 252 mm (9.9 in) barrel and 3.37 kg (7.43 lb) empty weight with folding stock. Used by engineers, artillery forces, rear-echelon troops and by special forces.

==== SS1-R5 Raider ====
A sub-variant of SS1-V5 called SS1-R5 is designed for mainly special units within the Indonesian Military such as the special infantry Battalion Raiders and other units such as Kostrad or Kopassus. The SS1-R5 is a lighter and slimmer design which doesn't sacrifice high accuracy. Designed for special forces operations such as infiltration, short distance contact in jungle, mountain, marsh, sea and urban warfare. SS1-R5 can be attached with bayonet and various types of telescopes. It has Safe, Single and Full Automatic firing options. Has a barrel length of 249 mm (9.8 in), overall length of 776 mm (30.6 in) and empty weight of 3.55 kg (7.83 lb).

=== SS1-M1/M2/M5 ===
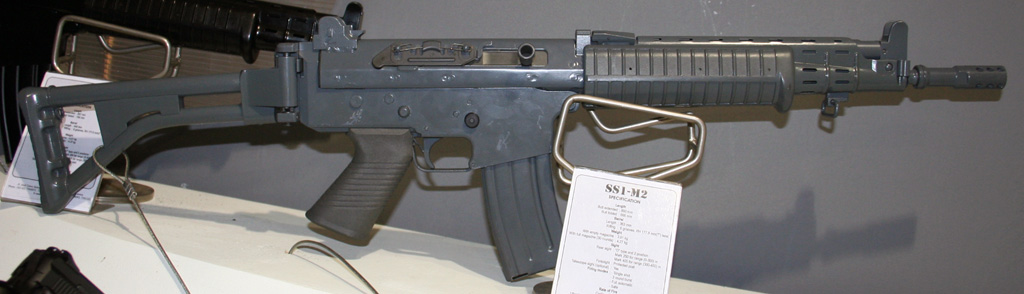
SS1-M2

The modified SS1 intended for the Indonesian Marine Corps. A special coating process ensures the SS1-M series to be able to hold up sea water and not easily rust. The variant is designed to function even after drenched in mud or sand. Available in 3 variants: SS1-M1, with a standard 449 mm (17.7 in) barrel and folding stock; SS1-M2, with a shorter 363 mm (14.3 in) barrel and folding stock and SS1-M5 Commando.

=== SB1-V1/V2 ===
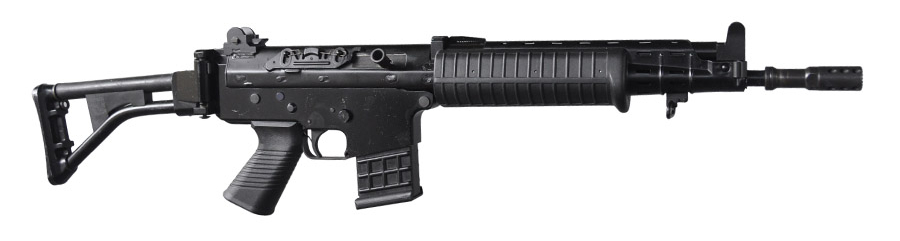
SB1-V1

A variant created for Indonesian police Sabhara unit use. It's the only rifle in the SS1 series chambered in proprietary 7.62×45mm cartridge (a necked-up version of the 5.56×45mm cartridge, utilizing a round-nose bullet similar to the .30 Carbine) created by PT Pindad for law enforcement conditions. The SB1 series has Safe, Single, and 3-round burst firing options. The SB1-V1 has a barrel length of 363 mm (14.3 in), overall length of 920 mm (36.2 in), and empty weight of 3.75 kg (8.27 lb). The SB1-V2 has a barrel length of 247 mm (9.7 in), overall length of 790 mm (31.1 in), and empty weight of 3.34 kg (7.36 lb).

=== SBC-1 ===
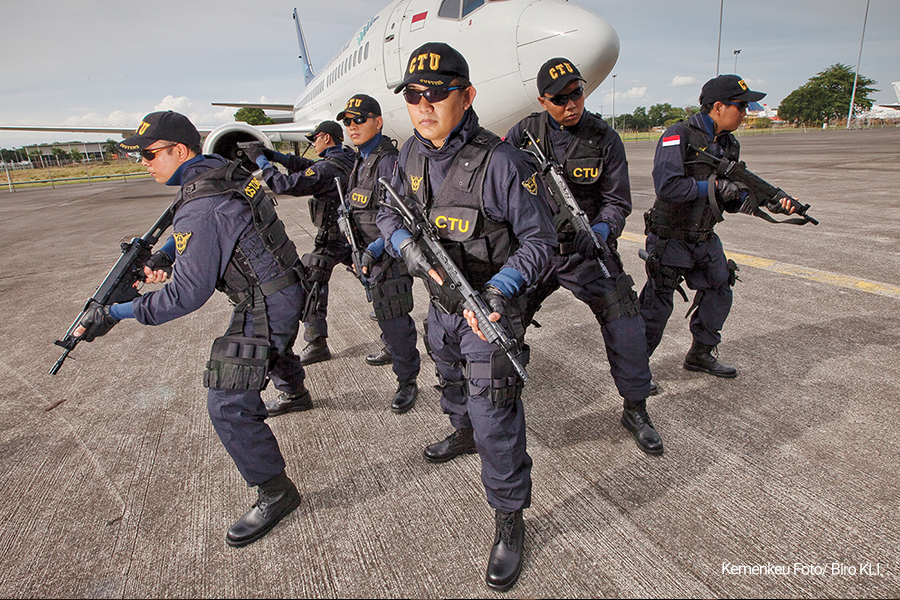
Indonesian customs with SBC-1

A variant of the SS1-V5 with semi-automatic mode only, made specifically for Indonesian customs as the rifle is named "Senapan Bea Cukai" (Indonesian: Customs & Excise Rifle).

=== SS1-C ===
In 2020, Pindad re-designed SS1 for civilians utilization, renamed as SS1-C. It fires 5.56×45mm NATO cartridge in semi-automatic mode. It has a 449 mm (17.67 inch) barrel, and weight 3.25 kg (7.16 lbs) without magazine. Firstly introduced during SHOT Show 2024 on 23–26 January 2024 at Venetian Expo & Caesars Forum, Las Vegas, Nevada, United States.

== Users ==
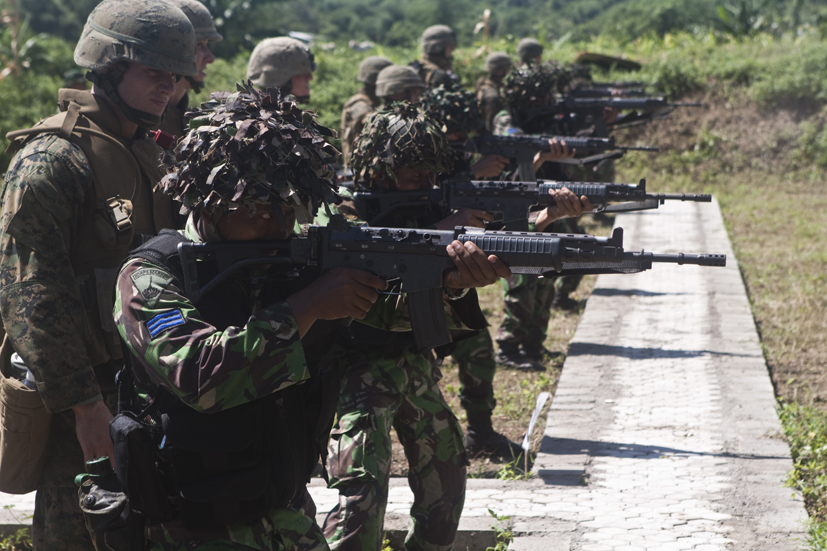
Indonesian Marines practice firing Pindad SS1-M1s at a shooting range in CARAT 2010.

- Cambodia: Exported in 1991.
- Indonesia: Komando Pasukan Katak (Kopaska) tactical diver group and Komando Pasukan Khusus (Kopassus) special forces group. Used by the Indonesian military and police.
- Laos: Purchased 35 SS1 V2 and 35 SS1 V4 assault rifles in 2014.
- Mali: Confiscated by Philippine customs officials when a ship bound to Mali, passing by the Philippines to deliver 10 P2 pistols, was raided after arriving in Philippine waters. The Malian government had ordered 100 SS-1V1 rifles. The rifles were meant to be used by Malian Ministry of Internal Security and Civil Protection. According to Fernandino Tuason of the Customs Intelligence and Investigation Service, he had received credible information that certain politicians were planning to use the weapons, mostly Galils, for destabilization efforts for the presidential elections scheduled to be held in 2010. Pindad officials have explained the misunderstanding since the SS1 rifles are not Galils. The Manila Bulletin has been the only media outlet to check that the Galils are not Galil rifles, but SS1s. In addition, they are presenting evidence that the small arms shipment is legal. It's suggested that a gun-running syndicate is the culprit for getting Indonesian-made weapons to the Philippines. According to further investigation, end user certificates issued by Indonesia were faked.
- Nigeria
- United Arab Emirates: Exported in 1992.

Non-state users:

- Free Papua Movement
- ISIL
  - East Indonesia Mujahideen
  - Maute Group

== See also ==
- FN FNC
- Ak 5 - Swedish assault rifle also derived from the FNC.
- Pindad SS2 - Replacement for the SS1.
