= Automatkarbin 4 =

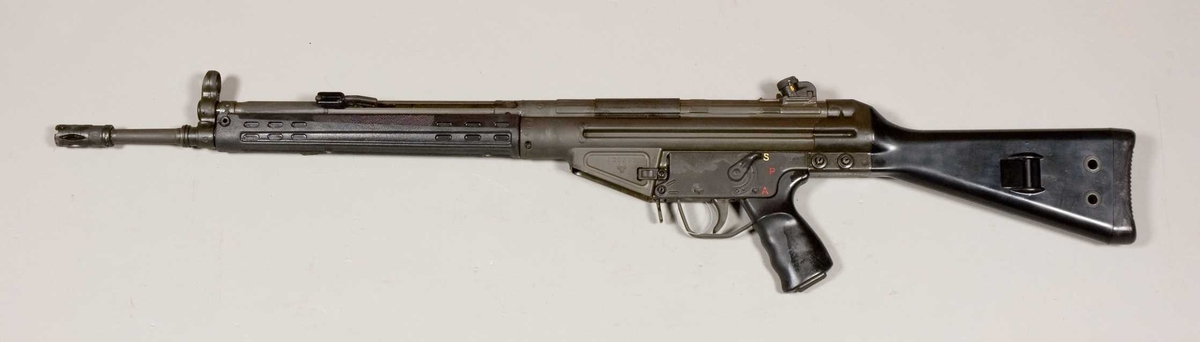
- An Ak 4 with magazine removed
- Type: Battle rifle
- Place of origin: Sweden; West Germany

Service history
- In service: 1964–present
- Used by: See Users
- Wars: War in Afghanistan

Production history
- Designer: Heckler & Koch
- Designed: 1950s
- Manufacturer: Husqvarna Vapenfabrik; Carl Gustafs stads gevärsfaktori
- Produced: 1965–1985
- Variants: See Variants

Specifications
- Mass: 4.1 kg (9.04 lb)
- Length: 1,045 mm (41.1 in)
- Barrel length: 450 mm (17.7 in)
- Width: 45 mm (1.8 in)
- Height: 220 mm (8.7 in) with inserted magazine
- Cartridge: 7.62×51mm NATO
- Action: Roller-delayed blowback
- Rate of fire: 500–600 rounds/min
- Muzzle velocity: 800 m/s (2,625 ft/s)
- Effective firing range: 500 metres (547 yd); 200–500 metres (219–547 yd) sight adjustments 100–600 metres (109–656 yd) with optics
- Maximum firing range: 3,700 metres (4,046 yd)
- Feed system: 20-round detachable box magazine.
- Sights: Rear: rotary diopter; front: hooded post

The Automatkarbin 4 (Ak 4; lit. 'Automatic Carbine 4') is a license-built Swedish version of the West German Heckler & Koch G3 battle rifle. It was adopted as the service rifle of the Swedish Armed Forces in 1965, replacing the bolt-action m/96 Mauser, the self-loading automatgevär m/42 and the automatic rifles Kulsprutegevär m/21, Kulsprutegevär m/40.

The initial Ak 4 incorporated some minor modifications compared to the original G3 design, including a 20 mm (0.79 in) longer buttstock, a serrated thumb groove on the bolt carrier to aid in silent bolt closure, a heavier recoil buffer for increased reliability and a rotary diopter rear sight with four apertures (numbered 2, 3, 4 and 5) used for: 200–500 metres (219–547 yd) in 100 metres (109 yd) increments.

The Ak 4 was manufactured from 1965 to 1985 by both Carl Gustafs stads gevärsfaktori in Eskilstuna and Husqvarna Vapenfabrik in Huskvarna.

It was replaced as the standard-issue service rifle in 1985 by the Ak 5, a license-built version of the FN FNC, but remains in use with the Home Guard and in specialist marksman roles within the regular armed forces.

== History ==
In the late 1950s, it was concluded that a plethora of older weapons needed to be replaced and that it would be advantageous to adopt the upcoming NATO cartridge to both lower the cost and allow import from abroad in crisis. Sweden held a trial of new weapons including: the Belgian FN FAL, the Swiss SIG SG 510, the Swedish Carl Gustaf GRAM 63, the American M14 and the German Heckler & Koch G3. After several different types of testing the FN FAL and Heckler & Koch G3 passed the tests. Due to its durability and lower price due to modern production methods the Ak 4 version of the Heckler & Koch G3 was selected as the new standard rifle in 1964, relegating the Carl Gustaf m/45 to second- and rear line service. Sweden and Heckler & Koch agreed a 15,000 round service life.

From 1965 to 1970 the Ak 4 was produced by Husqvarna and later changed to Carl Gustaf in Eskilstuna in 1970 until it was replaced by the 5.56×45mm NATO chambered Ak 5 (a version of the Belgian FN FNC), but the Ak 4 is still used in the Hemvärnet-Nationella skyddsstyrkorna (Swedish Home Guard). Sweden has supplied unmodified Ak 4s to Estonia, Latvia and Lithuania.

== Variants ==
- Ak 4: Swedish-made version of the G3A3. Many Ak 4 rifles have a windage table on the right side of the butt stock for correctly adjusting a telescopic sight for 1 metre per second (2.2 mph) and 5 metres per second (11.2 mph) crosswinds from 100–600 metres (109–656 yd) in 100 metres (109 yd) increments.
- Ak 4OR: Optiskt Riktmedel, optical sight. This model is fitted with a Hensoldt Fero Z24 4×24 telescopic sight mounted via a HK claw mount. During a few years it was not issued but it is now again in use by the Hemvärnet - Nationella skyddsstyrkorna (Swedish Home Guard). The Hensoldt Fero Z24 4×24 telescopic sight for G3 rifle and STANAG claw mount assembly were developed for designated marksman use. The Fero Z24 elevation knob features Bullet Drop Compensation (BDC) settings for 100–600 metres (109–656 yd) in 100 metres (109 yd) increments.
- Ak 4B: In this updated version the iron sights have been removed and replaced with an Aimpoint CS red-dot reflex sight mounted on a Picatinny rail (MIL-STD-1913). The rail is welded onto the rifle. Used by Hemvärnet - Nationella skyddsstyrkorna (Swedish Home Guard).'
- Ak 4C: An updated version of the Ak 4B with a 6-position adjustable-length buttstock with a cheek support comb optimized for aiming optics use designed and manufactured by the Swedish company Spuhr i Dalby AB. 5,000 Ak 4C began being fielded in 2017 by Hemvärnet - Nationella skyddsstyrkorna ("Swedish Home Guard").
- Ak 4D: An updated version of the Ak 4B with the adjustable-length buttstock of the Ak 4C as well as with the addition of a modular fore-end (also designed and manufactured by the Swedish company Spuhr i Dalby AB), a bipod and the Hensoldt Fero Z24 4×24 telescopic sight of the Ak 4OR mounted on a Picatinny rail (MIL-STD-1913). 400 Ak 4D will be used by the Swedish Army as a stop-gap designated marksman rifle (DMR).

== Users ==
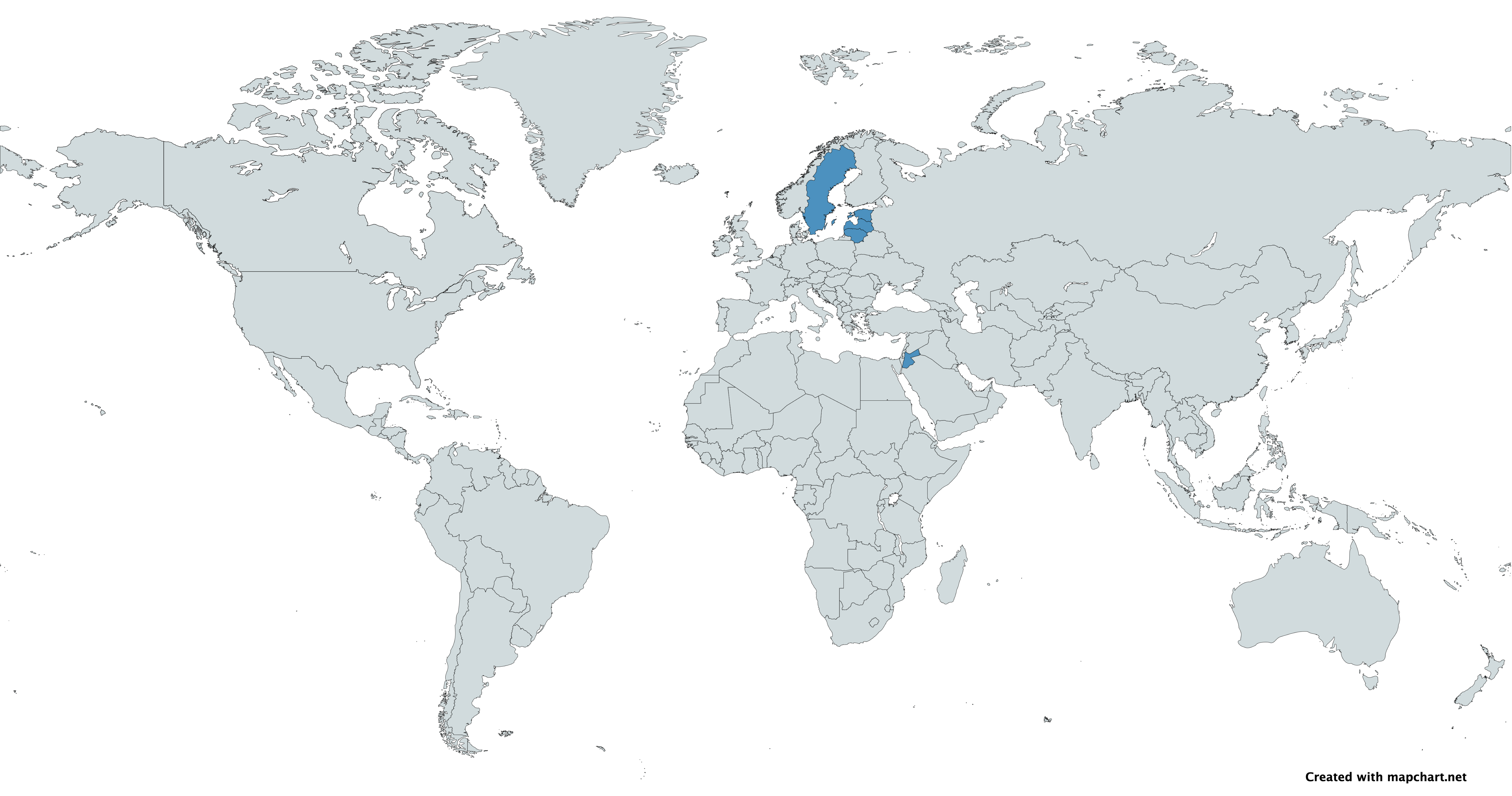
A map with users of the Ak 4 in blue

- Estonia - Some parts of the Estonian Defence League use the Ak4 variant.
- Jordan
- Latvia - Ak4 variant used by National Guard.
- Lithuania - Ak4 variant was used by the Lithuanian Armed Forces (reserve equipment), Lithuanian National Defence Volunteer Forces and is currently used in Lithuanian Riflemen's Union.
- Sweden - Made by three manufacturers, Heckler & Koch in Germany, and under license by Husqvarna Vapenfabrik (1965–70) and Carl Gustaf Gevärsfaktori (1965–80) which was later renamed to Förenade Fabriksverken (FFV) as the Ak 4 (Automatkarbin 4). Two sub-variants are known to exist, one equipped with a rail and Aimpoint sight (Ak4 B) and the other with a 4× magnifying optic, the Hensoldt Fero Z24 4×24 (Ak 4OR). It has since been replaced by the Ak 5 (Automatkarbin 5; a modified version of the FN FNC) in the regular army. Ak 4B and Ak 4OR, some times in combination with the M203 grenade launcher, is still in use in Hemvärnet – Nationella skyddsstyrkorna, the Swedish Home Guard. About 5,000 units received a new adjustable stock from 2016. An additional 5,000 units were ordered in 2019. In December 2020, the in-house review, Tidningen Hemvärnet, announced that 1,000 extra units had been ordered, meaning every soldier in the Home Guard would receive the new adjustable stock AK4C variant before the end of 2022.

== Gallery ==
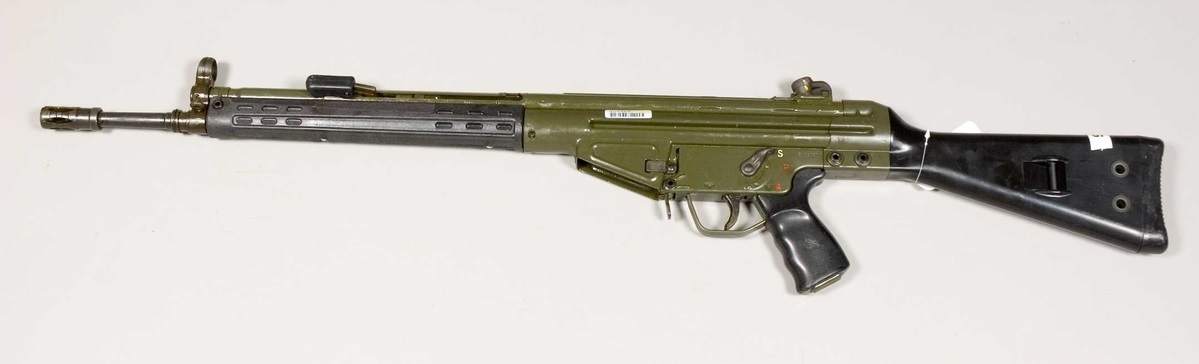
Ak 4 test model with green surface treatment

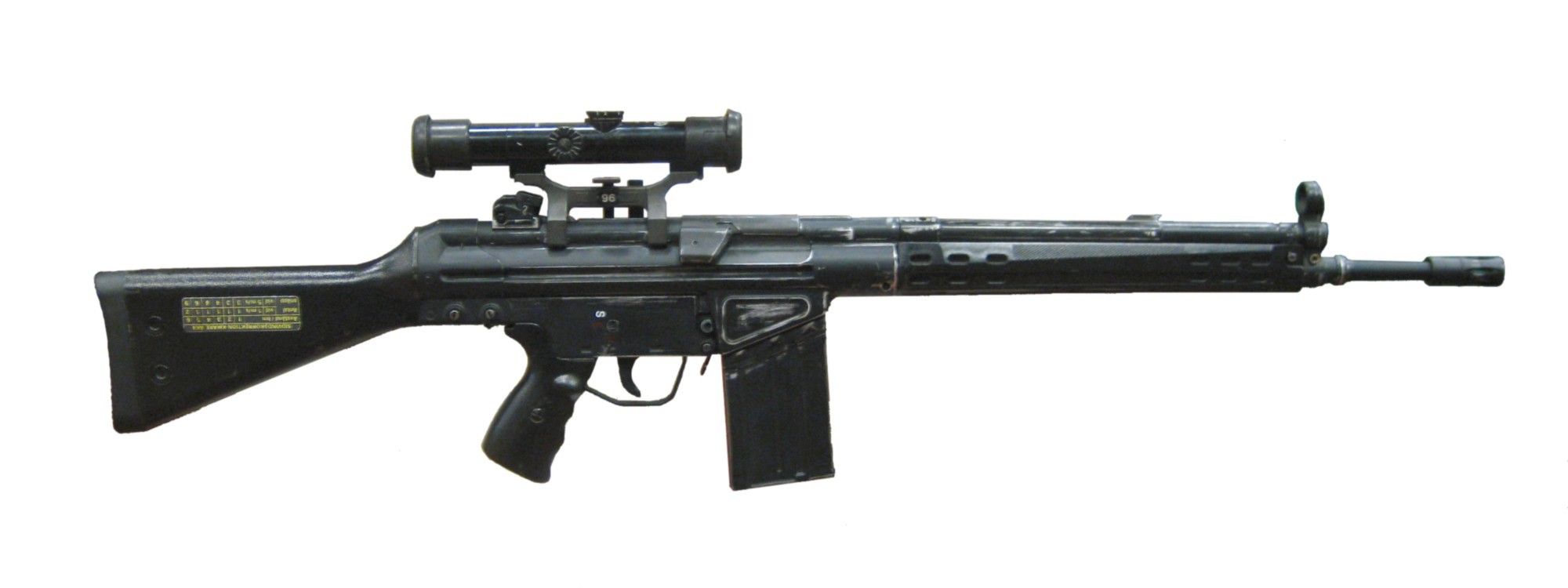
Ak 4OR with a Hensoldt 4×24 M1 telescopic sight of the Swedish Home Guard

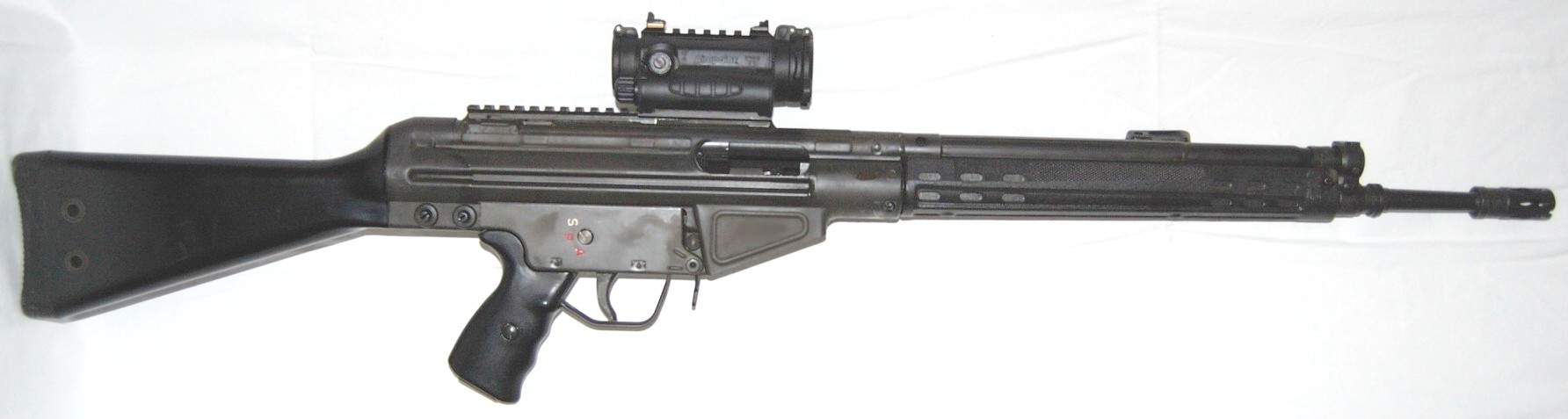
Ak 4B with Aimpoint sight of the Swedish Home Guard

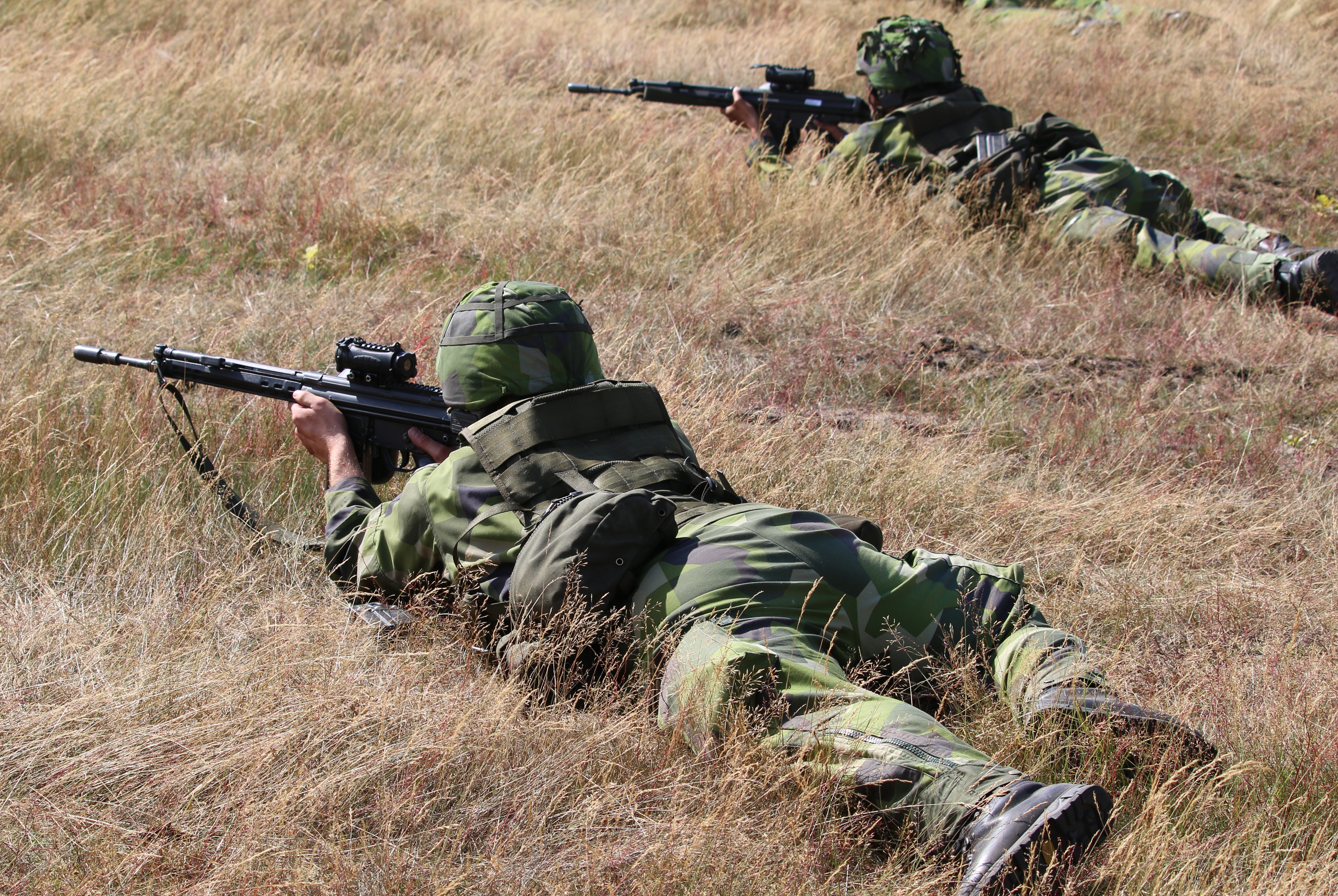
Ak 4B used by Swedish Home Guard members in 2015

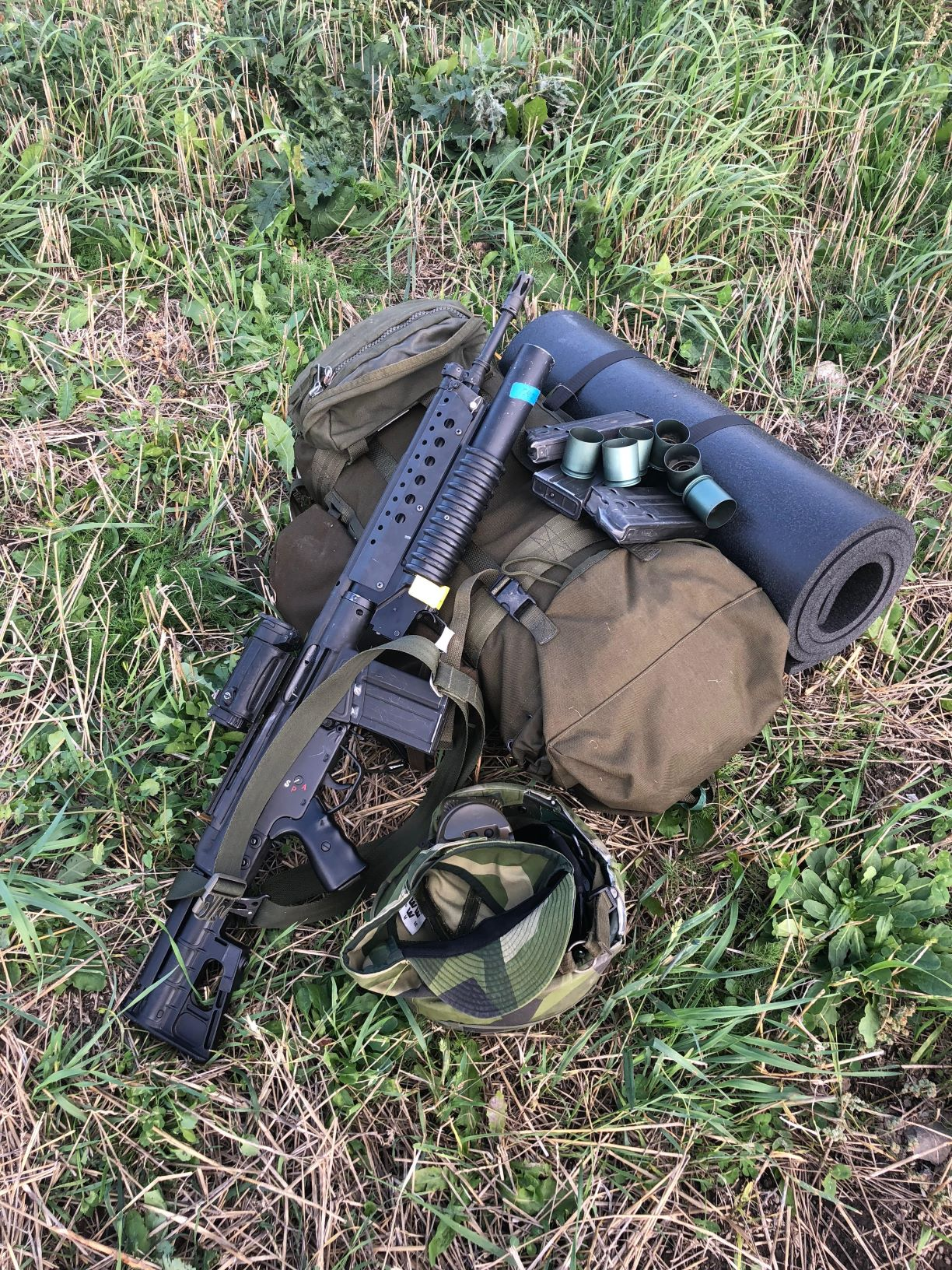
Ak 4C with underslung grenade launcher
