= FN CAL =

Belgian assault rifle

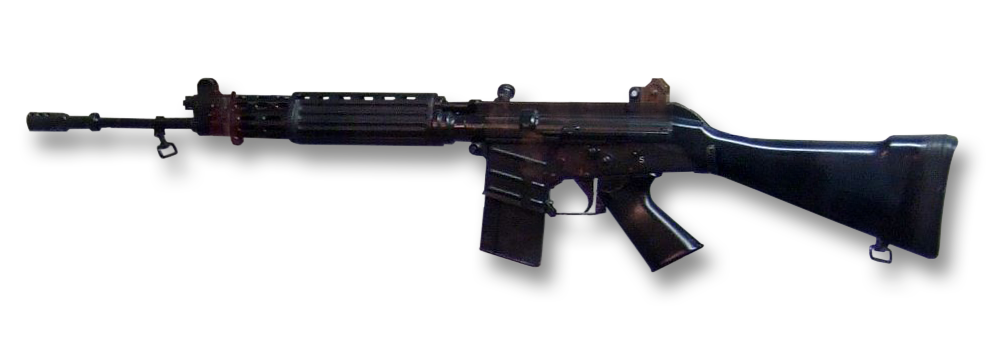
- FN CAL on display at the National Firearms Museum, United States.
- Type: Assault rifle
- Place of origin: Belgium

Service history
- Used by: See Users
- Wars: Vietnam War; Communist insurgency in Thailand; Colombian conflict Nicaraguan Revolution; Myanmar conflict The Troubles; Lebanese Civil War; Tuareg rebellion (1990–1995); 2014 Gaza War

Production history
- Designer: Ernest Vervier
- Designed: 1963–1966
- Manufacturer: FN Herstal
- Unit cost: (FY2022) $820
- Produced: 1966–1975
- No. built: Approx. 30,000

Specifications
- Mass: 3.35 kg (7.385 lbs)
- Length: 980 mm (38.58 in)
- Barrel length: 467 mm (18.4 in)
- Cartridge: 5.56×45mm NATO
- Action: Gas-operated, rotating bolt with interrupted thread
- Rate of fire: 850 rounds/min
- Feed system: 20-, 25-, or 30-round detachable box magazine
- Sights: Iron sights

The CAL (Carabine Automatique Légère, Light Automatic Carbine) is a Belgian assault rifle that was manufactured by Fabrique Nationale. It was the first 5.56 mm rifle produced by the Fabrique Nationale. It resembled the company's highly successful FN FAL, but was an original design. Unlike the FAL, it was a market failure, although its development led to the more successful FN FNC.

== Design details ==
Prior to the development of the CAL, FN had already constructed a scaled-down FAL prototype before shelving the idea as unmarketable. Noting the growing sales success of the cheaper and simpler HK G3 rifle, FN decided that for any future rifle to be competitive in the marketplace, it would need to use fewer expensive precision-machined parts. These would be replaced by less expensive castings and stampings where possible. While the construction of the new CAL reflected these design principles, it was still relatively expensive and complex, and met with no significant sales. It was eventually dropped for the even less expensive FN FNC. A small number of FN CALs were sold to the civilian market in the US.

== Operation ==
Although the weapon resembled a scaled-down FN FAL, it in fact used a rotating bolt, unlike the FAL, which used a tilting bolt design. The earlier models of the CAL had a three-round selector system, which allowed the weapon to fire a three-round burst with each trigger pull. The CAL could also fire in fully and semi-automatic modes.

The gun used long stroke gas piston to operate the bolt carrier, and the bolt itself had interrupted lugs to lock it into the chamber. Locking lugs were cut diagonally at a steep angle. So while the bolt is rotating to unlock, bolt face is slowly moving back, giving primary extraction of the case. Similar feature can be seen on MG 30, MG 15, MG 17 and MG 34.

== Users ==
- Belgium
- Colombia
- Gabon
- Lebanon: Lebanese Forces
- Mexico
- Morocco: Royal Moroccan Gendarmerie
- Myanmar: Karen National Liberation Army; captured by the Myanmar junta
- Nicaragua: National Guard and Sandinistas
- Palestine
- Thailand

=== For trials ===
- Pahlavi Iran: Tested the CAL for consideration to the Imperial Iranian Army, but was never adopted.
- France: Tested the CAL in the late 1960s and early 1970s for military adoption. It had a MAS-49/56 style rifle grenade launching system. But was never adopted.

=== Non-state users ===
- Abu Sayyaf: FN CAL was recovered when Abu Sayyaf leader was killed in a clash at Bohol.
- Provisional Irish Republican Army
- People's Movement for the Liberation of Azawad

== See also ==
- FN FAL, 7.62mm NATO predecessor
- FN FNC, successor
- List of assault rifles
