= Artillerie-Inrichtingen =

Former Dutch munitions manufacturer

- Type: State Company
- Industry: Artillery, Small Arms, Munitions, Explosives, Industrial Machinery, Precision Machinery, Lathes,
- Predecessors: Constructiewerkplaatsen, Artillerie Inrichtingen, Staatsbedrijf der Artillerie-Inrichtingen, Staatsbedrijf Artillerie-Inrichtingen
- Founded: 1679, Delft
- Founder: Willem III of Orange
- Defunct: 1983
- Successors: Eurometaal, Hembrug Machine Tools, Munitiefabriek Hembrug
- Headquarters: Netherlands
- Products: AR-10

Artillerie-Inrichtingen (Artillery Establishments, AI) was a Dutch state-owned artillery, small arms, and munitions company which also produced machine tools and was founded in 1679 in Delft, Netherlands. The company was split in 1973 with its defense related businesses becoming Eurometaal and its civilian manufacturing becoming Hembrug Machine Tools. During its years of operation as Artillerie Inrichtingen, the company manufactured armaments and an array of other industrial outputs for the Royal Netherlands Army and the Royal Netherlands East Indies Army (KNIL).

== History ==
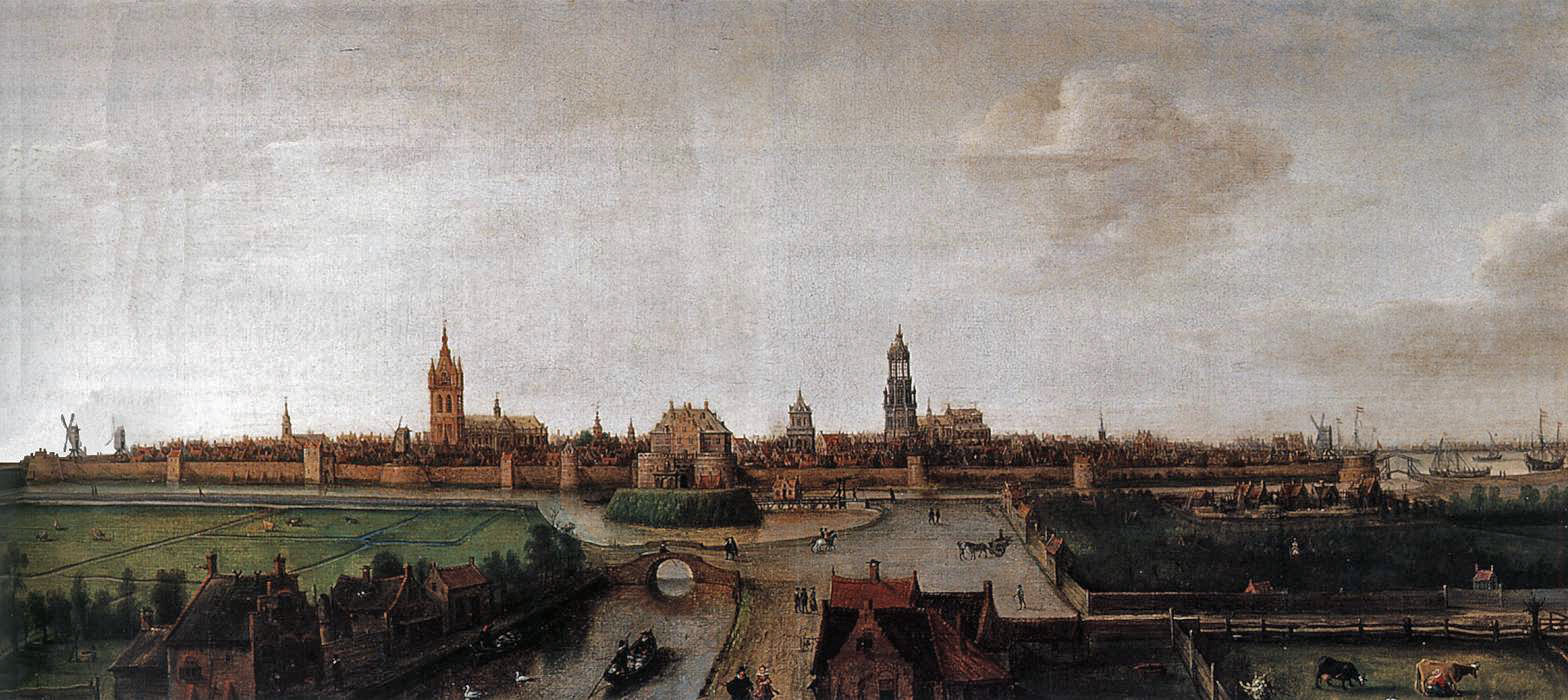
17th Century Delft, Netherlands

The tribulations of the year 1672 emphasized the neglected state in which the army of the Republic of the Seven Provinces found itself. Therefore, in 1677, Willem III of Orange founded the corps artillery. In 1679 the State Prosecution Company in Delft was established. It was not the only one in the Netherlands. For example, the Grof Geschut Gieterijin in The Hague and the Geweerfabriek in Culemborg were also known. With the creation of United Kingdom of the Netherlands in 1815 following the Napoleonic Wars and the period of French Occupation, there was a need for a strong army in order to provide a buffer against France. The artillery was improved under the direction of Prince Frederik. Arms production was reorganized and came under military leadership.

=== The Delft Company ===
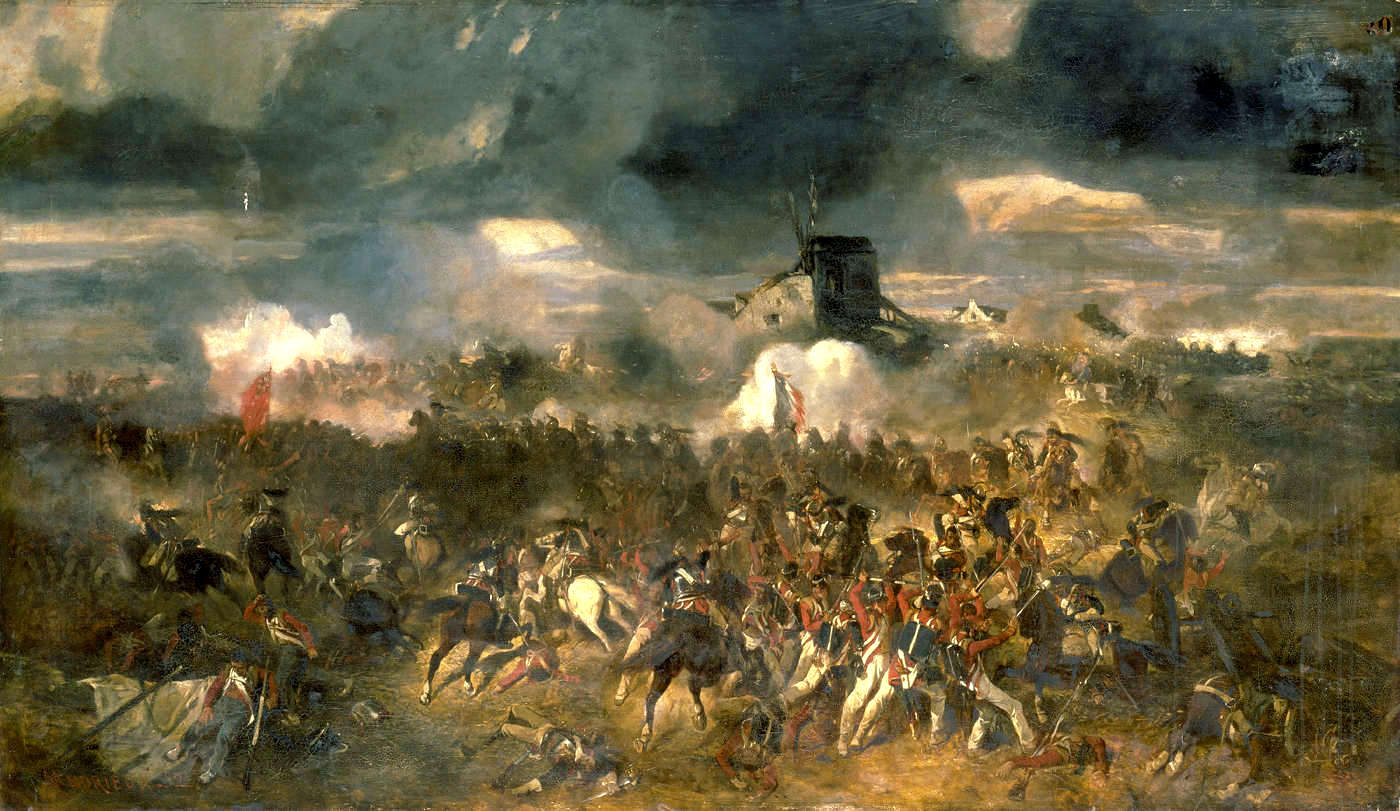
The Battle of Waterloo, 1815

In the period of peace between Waterloo in 1815 and the Belgian Revolution of 1830, the Delft company developed rapidly. By 1813, the company was already utilizing steam power and producing artillery, field guns, small arms and military vehicles. Other products were manufactured in facilities located in Liège, but this ended after 1830 when the Belgian Revolution geographically split off these facilities, leaving the company's production entirely in Delft. Again, a reorganization was undertaken and non-core tasks such as woodworking were rejected. The company focused its efforts on metalworking under the leadership of Colonel Ultich Huguenin (1755-1833). The company began to manufacture small arms and ammunition as well, while continuing to produce machinery and precision instruments. Because it was also a mining plant, lathes were required for the machining of artillery munitions and the like. Their manufacture of precision instruments required custom machines and, by 1836, the company was producing lathes for their own use. By about 1850 there were 500 people in the company. The quality of production was high.

In 1860 a pyrotechnic plant was set up for the manufacture of explosives. About 1880, the company consisted of a logistics center, a pyrotechnic school, a foundry, a workshop, a saddlery, a woodworking center, a gun shop, and a pattern factory. In 1884, the company introduced a small foundry for cast steel, which was the first industrial scale steel production in the Netherlands. With this addition, the company began using cast steel for the production of war materiels which were previously manufactured from cast iron or wrought iron.

=== The Hembrug Company ===
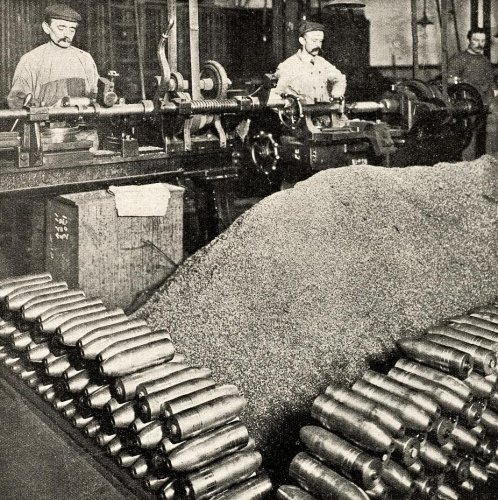
Artillerie Inrichtingen workers at the Hembrug plant use lathes to turn projectiles in the production of 75mm naval artillery shells Zaandam, Netherlands, 1912.

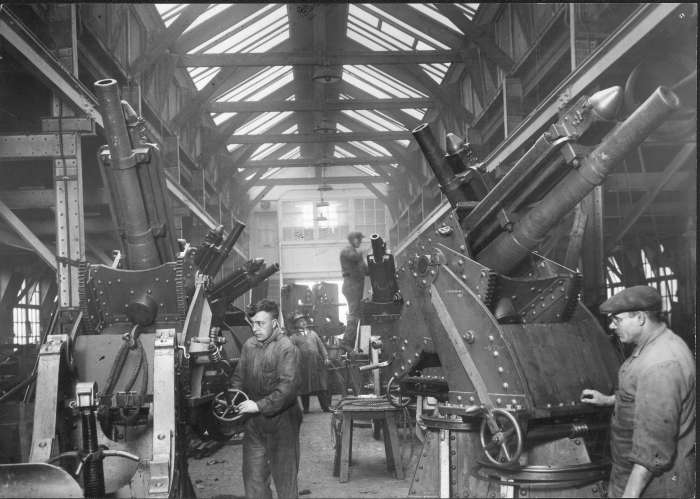
70MM Cannon Production, 1921.

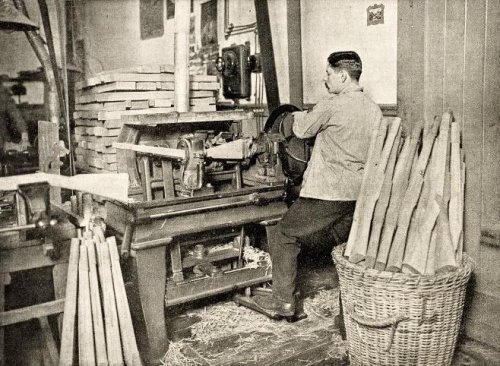
Rifle stock production. Zaandam, Netherlands, 1912.

In 1887 the company was renamed Artillerie Inrichtingen (A.I.). From this point, all production was no longer centered in Delft because the Hague Grove Geschut Gieterij was also included in the company. As the company's existing facilities had no space left to expand, a new site was sought. However, this search was limited to the territory within the defenses of The Stelling van Amsterdam. The company chose a new base of operations near Zaandam, where there were already some navy warehouses.

In 1899, Artillerie Inrichtingen moved to the Hemelveld on the Noordzeekanaal near Zaandam. The Hague shuttles were closed in 1904 and the services moved to Zaandam. In 1907, a gangway bridge was opened over the canal called Hembrug. Eventually the name of the bridge would pass on the company.

In 1912, Artillerie Inrichtingen was re-designated as a state-owned company, and was thereby withdrawn from the direct military authority. At this time, the company employed some 1200 people, including many soldiers. Most of its production was then going to the Dutch East Indies to suppress rebellions of the indigenous peoples, such as those the Aceh Wars.

After the outbreak of the First World War, production and staff increased quickly, reaching a height of 8500 people in 1917. Arms production increased by the large orders for the Royal Netherlands Army. After the end of the war, the country entered a period of disarmament with the establishment of the League of Nations. The number of employees fell to less than 2000 in 1921 and closure of the company was considered. As an alternative, automobiles were assembled and converted. The company also employed 200 drivers delivered mail, until this function was transferred to the "Mailies" of the Dutch National Postal Service in 1930.

In 1928, the organizational form of the company was changed to that of a public limited company which allowed for greater freedom of business management. The largest customer was still the KNIL, and the number of employees slowly recovered, before later falling back to 1200 in 1932 during the Depression, despite an increasing demand for the company's civilian production, including lathes. The German re-armament of the 1930s also led to increases in production. On 12 January 1940 AI got a Dutch order for the production of 10 infrared detection systems. In 1940, a plan was put in place to deny the Nazis use of Artillerie Inrichtingen's facilities, but this plan was not implemented before The Invasion.

=== World War II ===
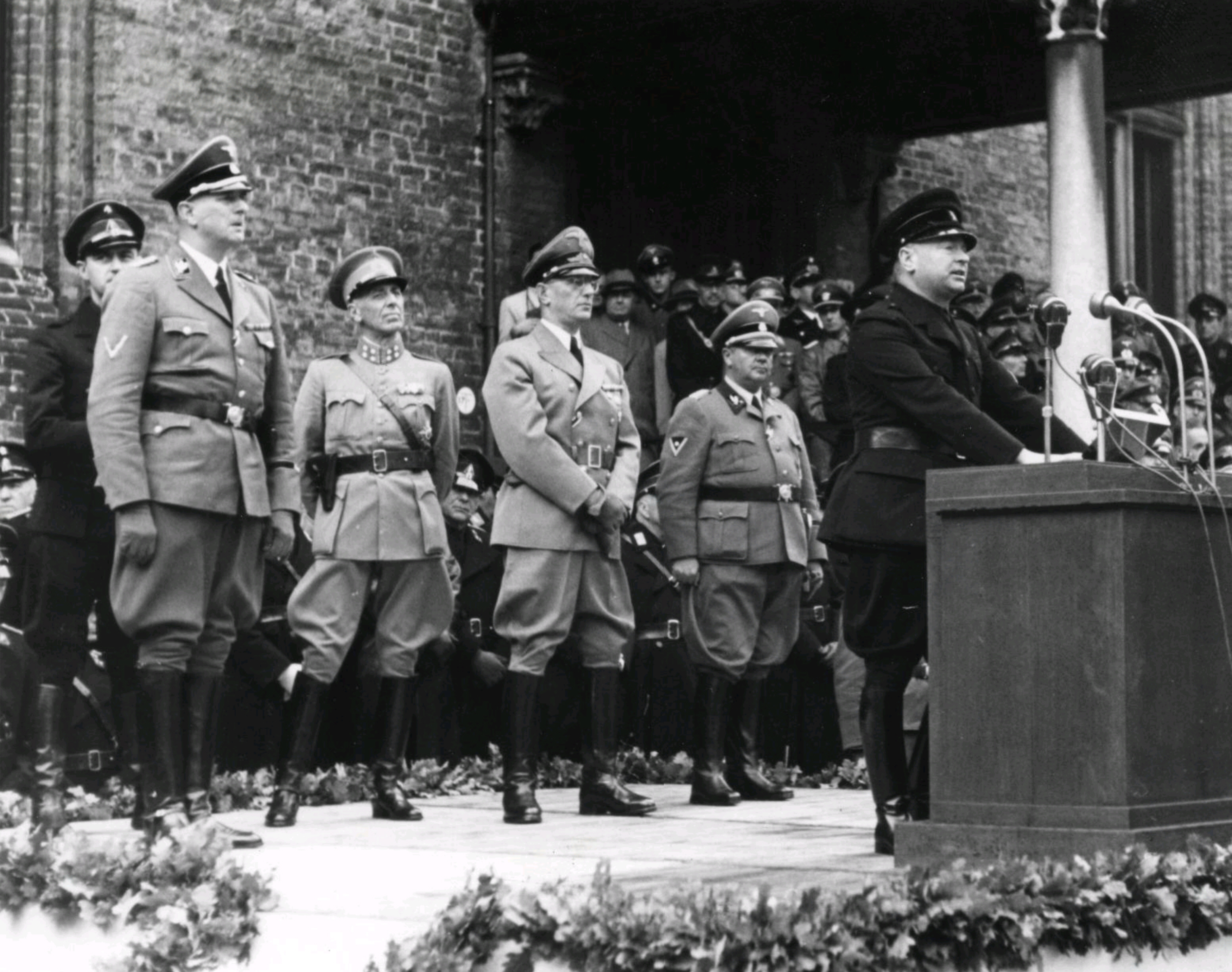
Wartime Dutch NSB Rally

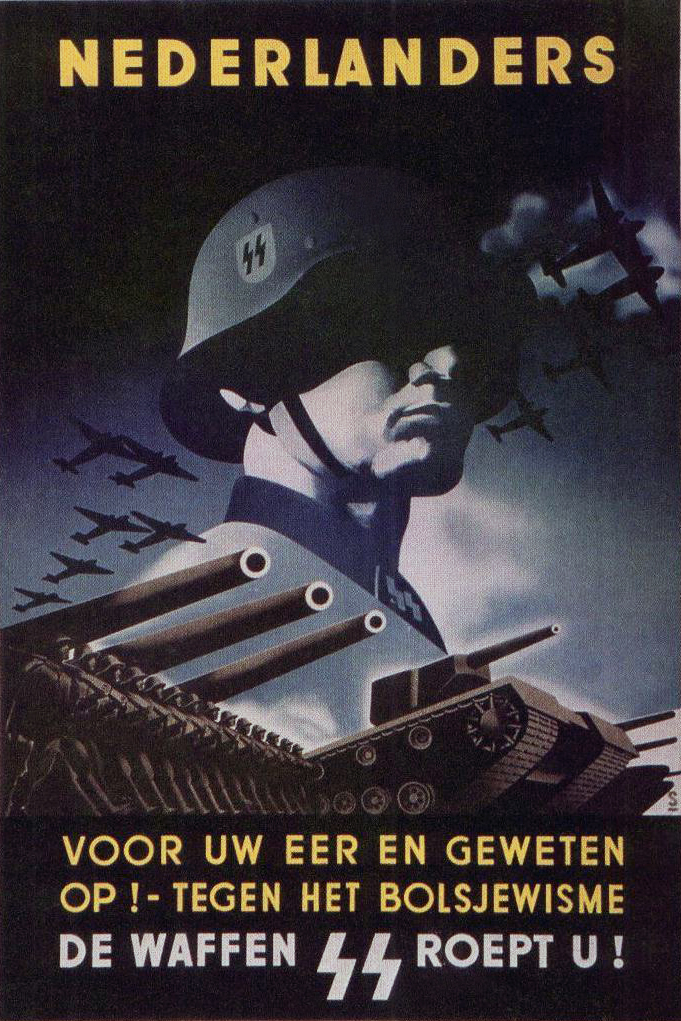

During the German occupation of the Netherlands, Frans den Hollander remained Director of Artillerie Inrichtingen, but he had contact with the Dutch government in exile. The Nazi's demanded immediate reopening of the factories following the surrender of the Netherlands, but Den Hollander and his superiors, Dutch Commander-in-chief Henri Winkelman and Secretary-General Cornelis Ringeling refused this initially, and succeeded in delaying the resumption of production for about a month. On June 20, 1940 production resumed. The Nazis kept the plants working during the war, but the workforce fell sharply. The company also tried to make as many civilian products as possible. This could be because the machine factory was sold in 1941. The Delft factory was also dismantled in secret in 1941. In 1944, when the Allies began to advance through The Low Countries and through the Hunger Winter the Artillerie-Inrichtingen factories were closed.

=== Post War ===
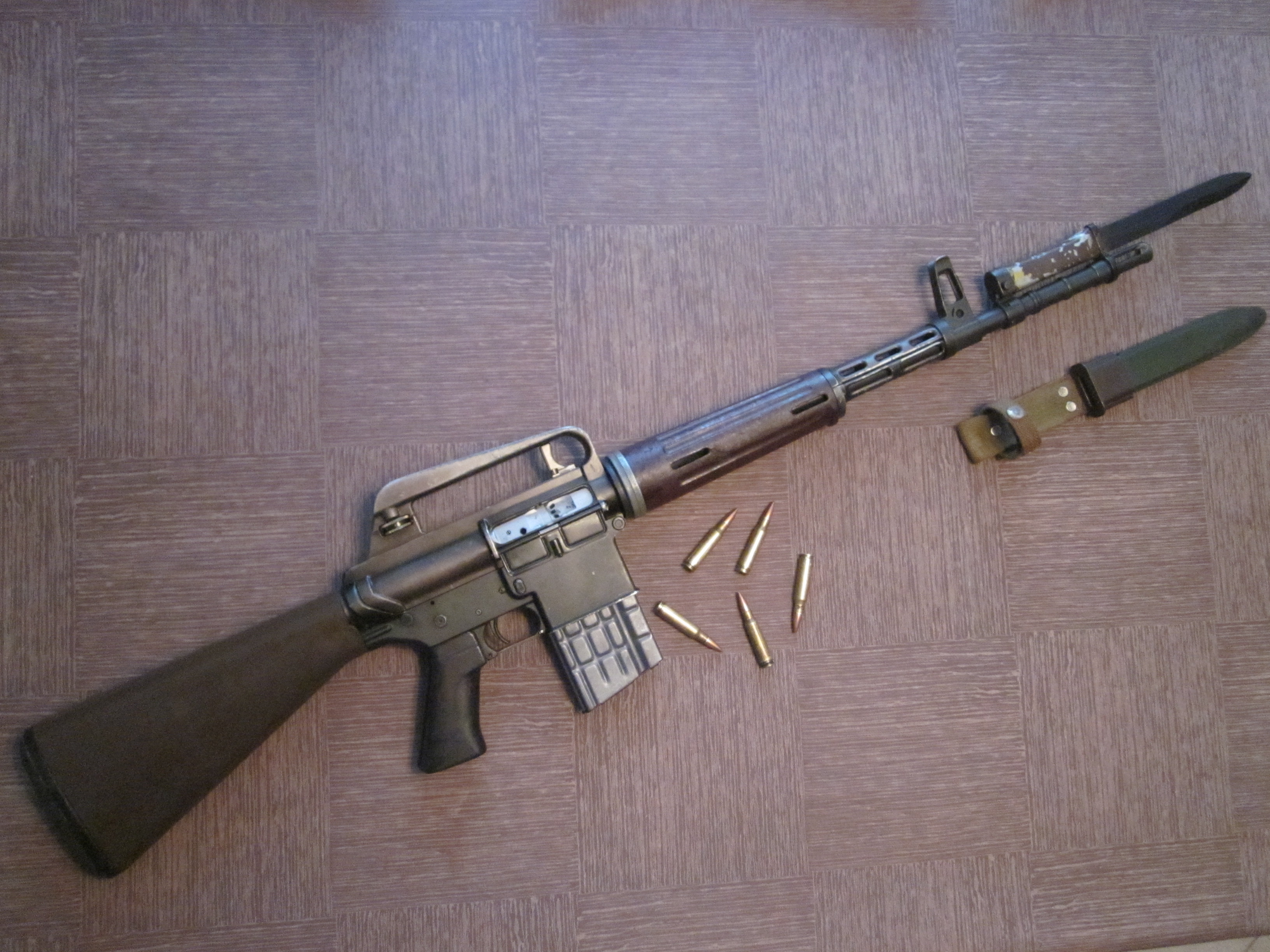
ArmaLite AR-10 with mounted bayonet made by Artillerie Inrichtingen (A.I.)

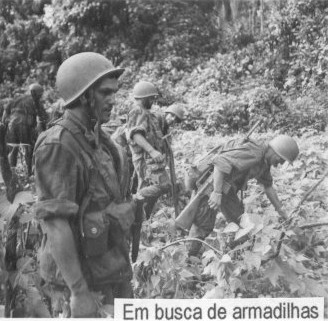
Portuguese Páraquedistas armed with Artillerie Inrichtingen produced AR-10 rifles during the Angolan War of 1961-1974.

After the Liberation in 1945, the company was restarted. The company, with the support of the Marshall Plan, produced agricultural tools such as seed and weeding machines and potato sorting machines for the post-war mechanization of Dutch agriculture. Thanks to the war in Dutch-India and The Cold War, there also remained a high demand for the company's ammunition and weapons production. It was during this time that the company became involved in the manufacture of AR-10 Battle Rifles for the Dutch, Portuguese, and Sudanese armies. This iconic rifle is the predecessor or the M16/M4/AR-15 series rifles, one of the world's most prolific assault rifle designs. The AR-10 was adopted by the Portuguese Paratroopers and came to be an iconic symbol of the Angolan War of Independence and the broader Portuguese Colonial Wars. The company also continued its long-standing production of lathes which led to numerous innovations. With the introduction of CNC Machining, the company's lathe making arm specialized in precision lathes from 1969 and went on to eventually become the Mikroturn division of Hembrug Machine Tools.

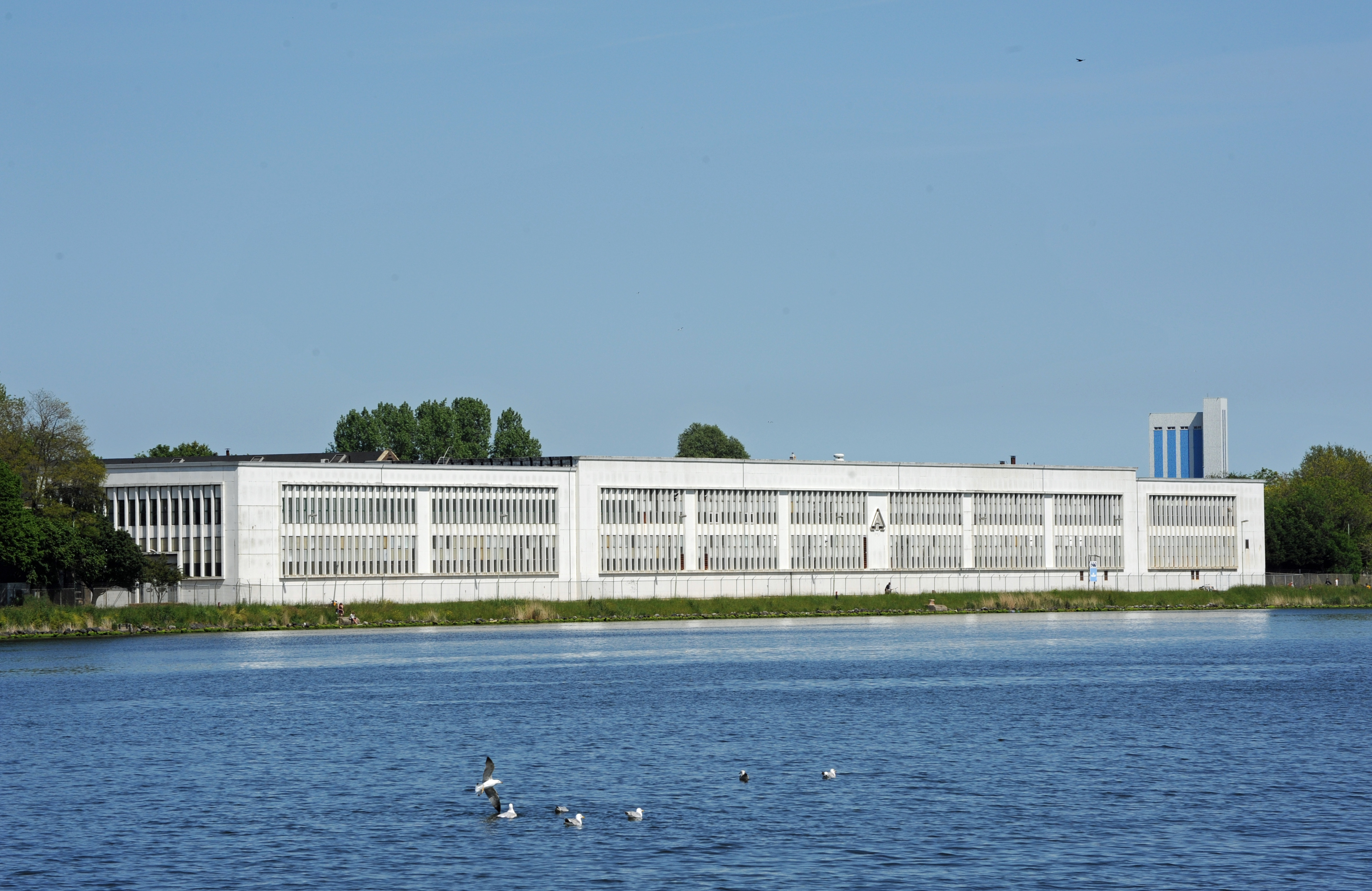
Eurometaal Headquarters

=== 1973 Split ===
In 1973 the Dutch government divided the company into two independent parts: Eurometaal, and Hembrug Machine Tools. Eurometaal took the company's military production facilities including those for arms and armaments, while Hembrug took the precision tool manufacturing. In 1983, the privatization of Hembrug followed the company moving to the Figeeweg in the Waarderpolder in Haarlem. Hembrug went on to develop ultra-precision lathes. Eurometaal also sought to target the civil market and manufactured parts for cars, forklifts, milking robots, high-precision precision tools, light commercials, sailboats, and durable locks. It also developed a press for the production of coins for the Dutch Mint, which struck guilders and later euro coins. A unique technical event was the acquisition of a 3000-ton soil pump, which was the largest in Europe in terms of capacity and stroke length.

=== Acquisition and repatriation ===
Rheinmetall

Eurometaal was eventually taken over by the German Rheinmetall and stopped production in 2003. The Eurometaal subsidiary at Bergen op Zoom, called Franerex, was also closed in 2003. Companies in Eurometaal Holding including Intergas at Coevorden and the German Heidel, which worked for the automotive industry, were rejected for a social plan for the last 200 employees. In the old mansion workshop at Zaandam, the Tetrix training center was established in the old Artillerie Inrichtingen masonry pattern factory, founded in 1939. They left the site in 2012.

=== Present ===
Production in the Hembrug area declined through the 1970s until the railway station serving the factory shut down in 1982. The old Artillerie Inrichtingen Hembrug factories fell into disuse. In 1983, the Hembrug Bridge, for which the area was named, was made obsolete by the Hemtunnel, then torn down in 1985. The former munitions factories were replaced by Eurometaal, then Rheinmetall facilities. As of 2017, the Hembrug Machine Tools company still makes precision lathes including the Mikroturn line in Haarlem. There are still a large number of industrial manufacturing plants in the Hembrug area, and the area is considered as an important industrial monument. On the site of the old Artillerie Inrichtingen Hemburg factories, the Hembrug Museum is furnished to provide information about the past, present and future of its activities.

As of 2021, the name Artillerie Inrichtingen is being used by the private company AI Armaments. The goal of this company is to provide domestic small arms and ammunition manufacturing within the Netherlands.

In 2026, they signed a major agreement to manufacture together with Israel Weapon Industries (IWI).

== Association with the AR-10 battle rifle ==
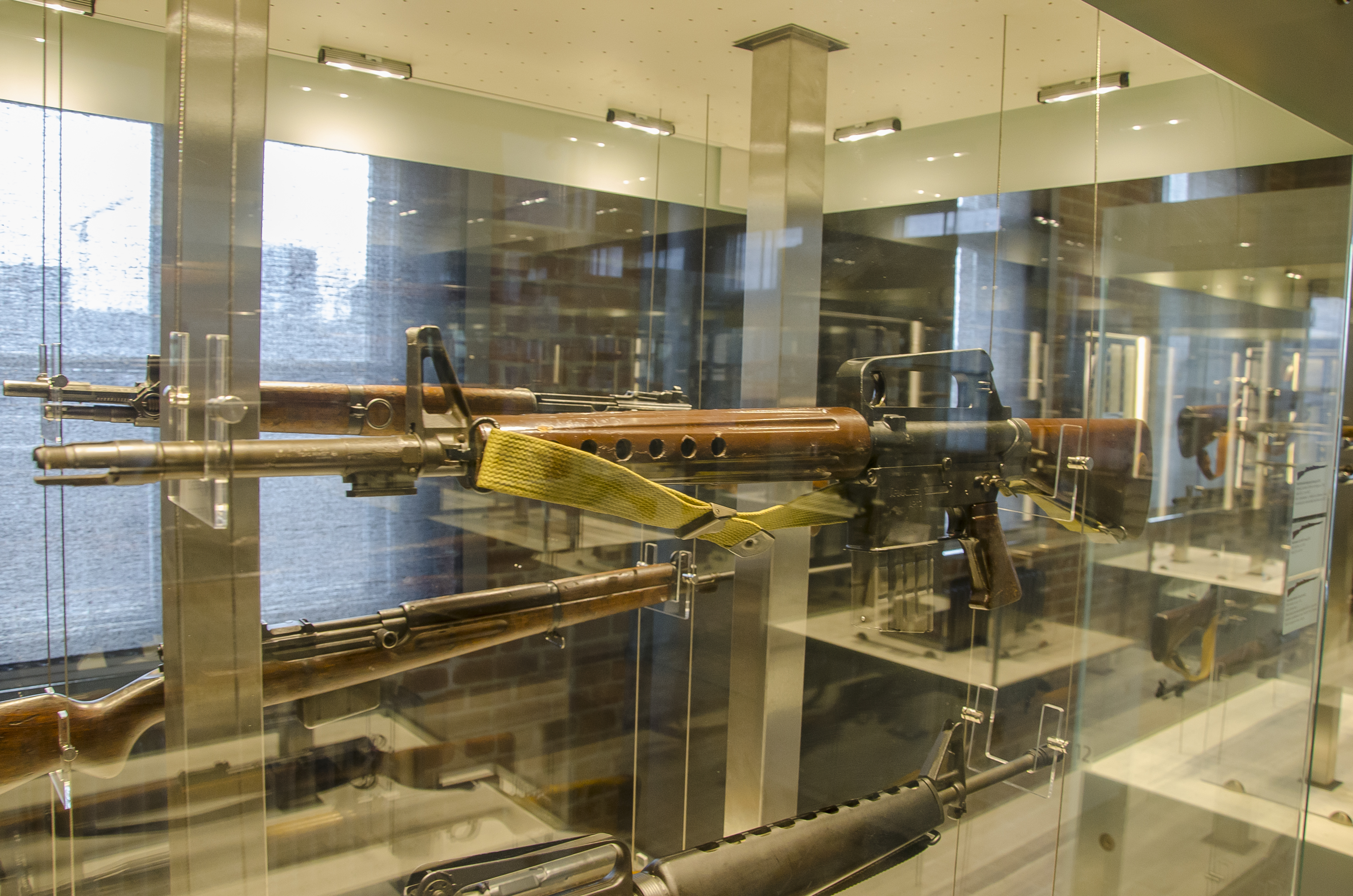
Artillerie Inrichtingen produced Sudanese AR-10

On July 4, 1957, Fairchild ArmaLite sold a five-year manufacturing license for the AR-10 to Artillerie Inrichtingen. The AR-10 was invented by Eugene Stoner in 1955 as a late entrant to the United States Army's Light Rifle Trials to replace the M1 Garand in US service. It was a revolutionary design in many ways, but lost the competition. It had however caught the interest of Foreign militaries which led to Armalite's deal with Artillerie Inrichtingen whose large factory and production facilities were felt could produce the ArmaLite rifle in the large quantities Fairchild anticipated would be needed to fulfill expected orders.

A.I. officials meanwhile discovered a number of manufacturing and production issues in the "Hollywood" (Armalite) version of the AR-10, all of which had to be resolved before large-scale production could commence. In addition to designing and building tooling for the rifle, the design had to be converted to metric dimensions and subcontractors had to be found to supply materials or manufacture component parts. ArmaLite also continued to send A.I. product improvement requests.

AR-10 production was limited, though Guatemala, Burma, Italy, Cuba, Sudan and Portugal all purchased AR-10 rifles for limited issue to their military forces with examples eventually turning up in unofficial service with various African and colonial armies, police, and guerrilla forces. The AR-10 remained in service with Sudanese Special Forces until 1985.

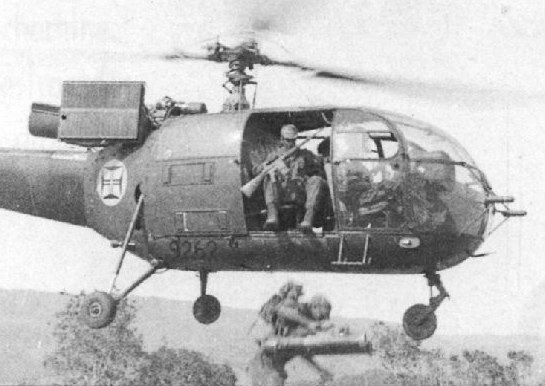
Portuguese páraquedistas armed with AR-10 rifles disembark from an Alouette III helicopter during the Angolan War of 1961-1974.

The final Artillerie Inrichtingen design is known as the Portuguese model AR-10. It is believed that approximately 4,000-5,000 Portuguese variants were produced; nearly all of them were sold to the Portuguese National Defense Ministry by the Brussels-based arms dealer SIDEM International in 1960. The AR-10 was officially adopted by the Portuguese Paratrooper Battalions (Caçadores páraquedistas), and the rifle saw considerable combat service in Portugal's counter-insurgency campaigns in Angola and Mozambique.

Additional sales of the AR-10 rifle were stymied after the Netherlands embargoed further shipments of the rifle to Portugal. The A.I. produced Portuguese AR-10s continued in service with a few Portuguese airborne units, and was in use as late as 1975 in the Portuguese Timor (East Timor) decolonization emergency.

Fairchild-ArmaLite was dissatisfied with the delays in setting up the tooling and production at A.I. for the AR-10, and made it clear that they would not be renewing A.I.'s license to produce the rifle. By 1960, hampered by Dutch export restrictions and discouraged by the lack of arms sales to major national purchasers, Artillerie Inrichtingen decided to exit the small arms production business altogether, and ceased all production of the AR-10 under its license from Fairchild-ArmaLite. By that time, fewer than 10,000 AR-10s had been produced, mostly military select-fire rifles, with a few semi-automatic only rifles produced for civilian use. All A.I. AR-10 parts inventories, tooling, and prototypes were either sold or scrapped; the barrel tooling was sold to Israel sometime in the early 1960s. All AR-10 production records, design drawings, manuals, literature, and other publications then in inventory were discarded.

== See also ==
- AR-10
- M+G project
- Eurometaal
- Rheinmetall
