= PVAR rifle =

Pneumatic Valve and Rod rifle
- Type: Assault rifle, Battle rifle
- Place of origin: Philippines

Service history
- Wars: Anti-guerilla operations against the New People's Army, Moro Islamic Liberation Front, Abu Sayyaf, Operation Enduring Freedom - Philippines, War in Afghanistan, International Peace Support and Humanitarian Relief Operations, UN Operation

Production history
- Designed: 2009
- Manufacturer: United Defense Manufacturing Corporation
- Produced: 2009-present

Specifications
- Cartridge: 5.56×45mm NATO; 7.62×51mm NATO
- Action: Proprietary Gas-operated long-stroke piston, rotating bolt
- Feed system: Various STANAG magazines, Beta C Mag
- Sights: Iron sights, Red-dot sights, Optical sights

UDMC PVAR rifles are Filipino variants of the Armalite AR-15 and AR-10, using the Pneumatic Valve and Rod system manufactured by United Defense Manufacturing Corporation.

== History ==
United Defense Manufacturing Corporation undertook the development of the rifle as a possible replacement for traditional AR-15 designs.

Philippine Letters of Patent Nos. 1-2009-000176 and 1-2011-000062 were issued in 2009 and 2011, respectively.

== Design ==
PVAR rifles are installed with one-piece free-floated M1913 quad rail handguards made of 7075-T6 aluminum mounted on a matching proprietary barrel nut.

UDMC offers the PVAR System on four series of rifles: the F5/F7-PVAR and the S5/S7-PVAR.

The “F-series” models are fully automatic, and “S-series” rifles are semi-automatic. The PVAR system is offered as F5/S5 variants of the M16 and M4 in 5.56 NATO with barrel lengths from 7.5" and 22", and also available as F7/S7 variants of the M110 in 7.62×51mm with barrels starting at 14.5" up to 25".

Three barrel types are available: black Parkerized 4150 carbon steel, matte finish SS-410 stainless steel, and AISI-416 supplied by Dikar S. Coop BERGARA of Spain. All barrels are threaded to accept standard AR muzzle devices. Accuracy is claimed to be 1 MOA from the factory.

A mil-spec single stage trigger comes standard with an optional two-stage trigger available for semi-auto precision use.

== Operation ==
The Pneumatic Valve and Rod system was created to be a more reliable alternative to the Stoner bolt and carrier piston system used in the AR-15 family, commonly but incorrectly referred to as a direct impingement system.

UDMC states that the PVAR system is designed to be easily removed from the front of the gas block, and does not require removal of the handguard to access the gas system for cleaning or repairs.

The PVAR system was designed in an attempt to reduce malfunctions by preventing the buildup of heat, lead and copper fouling inside the receiver by utilizing mechanical energy instead of the pressurized gases of the cartridge to cycle the bolt, the process by which a round of ammunition is fired, ejected, and a new round is loaded.

Instead of a hollow gas tube, it uses a one piece bolt carrier with a piston rod which transfers the energy of the gas produced by the round and pushes the bolt carrier rearwards. The manufacturer advertises that the PVAR system reduces the need for field maintenance and overall wear and tear compared to the standard AR-15 design.

Unlike many gas piston systems, the PVAR features a free-floating piston rod that, upon firing, travels rearward and essentially increases the mass of the bolt carrier group during most of the firing cycle in order to reduce recoil. The manufacturer states that this system is compatible with barrel twists of 1:7, 1:9, and 1:12, as well as M193 and M855 ammunition. Compared to a standard AR-15, the PVAS rifle has a slower rate of fire of around 750rpm due to the increased effective mass of the bolt carrier group when firing. The bolt head is milled from Carpenter 158 steel and the Bolt Carrier Groups are made of AISI 8620 steel.

== Users ==
- Philippines
  - Armed Forces of the Philippines
    - Special Operations Command

== See also ==
- CAR 816
- KS-1 rifle
- LWRC M6
- M4 carbine
- IWI ARAD
- Pindad AM1
- G13 carbine
- Haenel MK 556
- Dasan Machineries DSAR-15
- Special Operations Assault Rifle
