= MGX =

MGX may refer to:

- Magix, a German software company
- MGM Energy, a Canadian oil company (TSX ticker:MGX)
- Montenegro Airlines (1994–2020, ICAO:MGX)
- Mysterious Girlfriend X, a Japanese manga (2004–2014)
- Magnesium halide (MgX)
- .MGX, a brand of Materialise NV, a Belgium 3D printers'
- MGX (company), an Emirati investment firm
- SureFire MGX, a prototype machine gun
