= Beta C-Mag =

100-round drum magazine

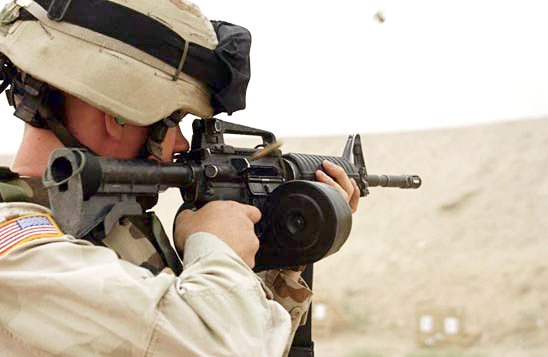
A Beta C-Mag undergoes field testing on an M4 carbine

The Beta C-Mag is a twin-drum, high-capacity magazine that accepts up to 100 rounds of ammunition. Manufactured by the Beta Company, it was designed by Jim Sullivan and first patented in 1987 and has been adapted for use in numerous firearms firing the 5.56×45mm NATO, 7.62×51mm NATO, and 9×19mm Parabellum cartridges. C-Mag is short for century magazine (The letter C is also the Roman numeral for the number 100), referring to its 100-round capacity. It has two drum units, each of which hold half of the cartridges inserted into the magazine. The latest version of the magazine is available with a transparent backing to allow the user to see the number of rounds remaining in the magazine. A C-Mag loaded with 5.56×45mm NATO ammunition typically weighs about 2.1 kg (4.63 lb); a C-Mag loaded with 7.62×51mm NATO ammunition weighs 4.77 kg (10.5 lb).

A version adapted for the M16 rifle is used by the U.S. military. The magazine design, including drawings, is covered in detail in U.S. patent 4,658,700.

== Design ==
Fully loaded.

Empty.

Schematic illustration between a full and empty Beta C-magazine

The C-Mag is a compact, twin-drum, high-capacity magazine design that accepts up to 100 rounds of ammunition. It consists of two main components: the twin-drum storage housing and an interchangeable feed clip assembly. The storage housing is standard and fits any like-caliber weapon. The feed clip assembly serves as an adapter for the specific weapon.

Before loading and after firing, the feed clip is filled with spacer rounds that are an integral part of the magazine. The upper half of the top spacer round is tapered to allow the weapon bolt to close after the last round is fired. The length of the string-set depends on the customized feed clip for the individual weapon.

During loading, cartridges are inserted on top of the spacer rounds, through the feed clip and into the drums. The cartridge column splits at the juncture of the feed clip and the housing to distribute the ammunition evenly into the drums in two concentric rows.

During firing, spring-driven rotors advance the cartridges in both drums until they meet at a cam blade that merges the cartridges into a single column that feeds up through the feed clip and into the weapon.

The Beta Company billed its magazine as "a revolutionary twin-drum high-capacity magazine for 5.56mm, 9mm and 7.62mm rifles, light support and other specialized weapons." At the time of closing its business, the Beta Company described the C-Mag as "the original high-capacity magazine." It had sold the magazine internationally for 37 years to law enforcement, militaries, and civilian firearm hobbyists.

== Firearms compatible with C-Mag cartridges ==
9×19mm Parabellum

- Colt 9mm SMG
- Heckler & Koch MP5
- Uzi
- Glock, plus these firearms using a Glock magazine:
  - KRISS Vector Gen II
  - Kel-Tec SUB-2000
- CZ Scorpion Evo 3

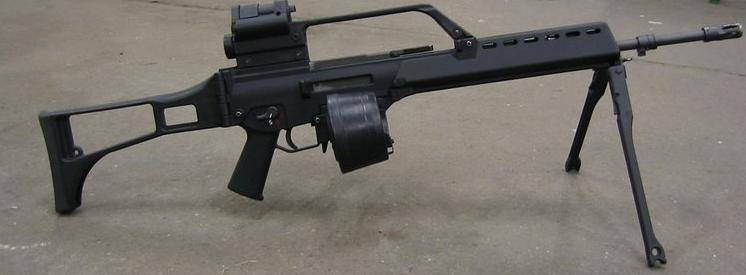
A Heckler & Koch G36 of the German Army equipped with a Beta C-Mag and bipod stand.

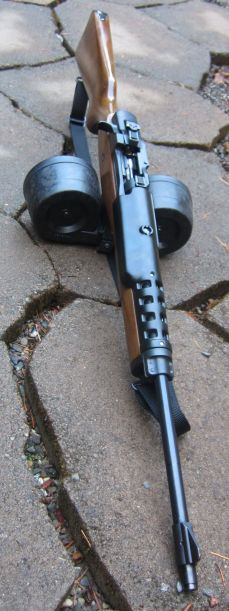
A Mini-14 carbine equipped with a Beta-C variant

5.56×45mm NATO (STANAG magazine with Mini-14 compatibility)

- FN Minimi
- M249 light machine gun
- Ultimax 100
- AR-15-style rifle
- AR-15-style pistol
- Beretta ARX-160
- FN SCAR
- Heckler & Koch G36
- Heckler & Koch HK33
- Heckler & Koch HK416
- Heckler & Koch HK 93
- Heckler & Koch XM8
- M4 carbine
- M16 rifle
- PVAR rifle
- Ruger Mini-14
- SA80
- SIG SG550 / 551 / 552 / 553 / 556
- Steyr AUG
- CZ 805 BREN
- IMI Galil

7.62×51mm NATO

- AR-10A, and various firearms using SR-25 pattern magazines.
- FN FAL (no longer available)
- FN SCAR (modified FAL-pattern)
- Heckler & Koch HK91 and Heckler & Koch G3
- M14 rifle
- AR-10B (modified M14-pattern)

Airsoft

- AR-15-style rifles and other rifles or pistols built for airsoft, like a Glock or other pistols as described earlier in the article (please find sources) can take airsoft designed Beta C-mags.
- Example: LevAR-15 modern lever action built for airsoft.

== Performance evaluations ==
A test in 2003 by U.S. Army soldiers in Afghanistan found the C-Mag unreliable in simulated combat conditions and reported frequent failures to feed among the issues; likewise, British Armed Forces trials found that the C-Mag did not give reliable performance when loaded with British-issue ammunition. The Beta C-Mag is not in widespread use by U.S. military forces, and has not been type-classified.

In November 2008, the U.S. Army Experimental Task Force (AETF) at Fort Bliss, Texas, evaluated six Beta C-Mag magazines. Four magazines—two with black covers and two with clear covers—were used with M4 carbines in three firing scenarios: controlled pair, controlled burst, and rapid fire. According to the memorandum summarizing the evaluation, the four magazines "performed flawlessly in all three scenarios without jams or stoppages". Additionally, two magazines with black covers were evaluated with M249 light machine guns in controlled burst and rapid-fire scenarios. These also performed without "issues", according to the memo, which also notes that soldiers "had only positive comments" about the C-Mag magazines during the After Action Review (AAR).

Test-fired with a Heckler & Koch HK91, Heckler & Koch G3 and two other Heckler & Koch-based weapons, the 7.62mm C-Mag was found to operate without problems in either loading or firing at rates up to 1,000 rounds per minute.

== See also ==
- Drum magazine
- Magazine
- North Hollywood shootout
