= Group of Thirteen =

Group of Thirteen could refer to:

- U15 Group of Canadian Research Universities, Group of Canadian Universities
- Protest of the Thirteen (March 18, 1923) Cuban Historical Event, in which the "Manifesto of the Group of Thirteen" was signed
- G8+5

== See also ==
- G13
