= SureFire MGX =

- Type: Squad automatic weapon, Light machine gun
- Place of origin: United States

Production history
- Designer: Jim Sullivan
- Manufacturer: SureFire LLC

Specifications
- Cartridge: 5.56×45mm NATO, 6.8x43mm Remington SPC
- Caliber: 5.56mm, 6.8mm
- Action: Gas-operated, rotating bolt
- Rate of fire: 550-650 rounds per minute
- Feed system: 30-round detachable STANAG magazine

The SureFire MGX is a light machine gun designed by Jim Sullivan, Bob Waterfield, Alan Ostrowski, Paul Latulippe Jr. and Hyunjung Samuel Eyssautier in 2002 and produced in prototype form only by ArmWest, LLC and marketed by SureFire, LLC as a technology demonstrator.

== Overview ==
The SureFire MGX is a light machine gun featuring various elements from the many arms Sullivan designed in the past. The MGX is essentially a unified machine gun and rifle concept, similar to that of the Stoner 63 system. It is also noted to feature a very similar bolt components to the AR-15 and the various operations and quick change barrel of the Ultimax 100. The weapon fires from a closed bolt when firing semi-auto and from an open bolt when firing full-auto. The MGX features a stock that can fold both ways and can also be removed.

== See also ==
- List of machine guns
- M+G project
- Stoner 63
- Ultimax 100
