= M+G project =

Dutch automatic rifle

Artillerie-Inrichtingen MG09
- Type: Automatic rifle Squad automatic weapon
- Place of origin: Netherlands

Production history
- Designed: 1962
- Manufacturer: Artillerie-Inrichtingen

Specifications
- Cartridge: 5.56×45mm NATO; 7.62x51mm NATO
- Caliber: 5.56mm 7.62mm
- Action: Gas-operated, rotating bolt

The M+G project / MG09 was a project by Artillerie-Inrichtingen for a rifle/squad automatic weapon to replace the M1 Garand in the Dutch armed forces.

The M+G project is a gas operated, long stroke piston operated rifle/squad automatic weapon using a 6-lug rotating bolt. The barrel is removable and comes with a folding vertical foregrip attached to the gas block. The belt feeder is a machined simplified variant of the MG42 and is on the left side of the receiver allowing the use of sights as well as target acquisition.

== See also ==
- List of machine guns
- ArmaLite AR-100 – (United States)
- Stoner 63 – (United States)
- SureFire MGX – (United States)
- Ultimax 100 – (Singapore)
