= Eurometaal =

Former ammunition company in the Netherlands

- Industry: Small Arms, Munitions, Explosives
- Headquarters: Zaandam, Netherlands

Eurometaal was one of the leading ammunition producing companies of the Netherlands. Its headquarters were in Zaandam.

== History ==
Originally, Eurometaal was an industrial military complex that set up camp in Zaandam around 1900, and adopted the name Eurometaal in 1973. Eurometaal has developed weaponry for the Royal Netherlands Army from NR20 C1 hand grenades to tanks.

In the nineties, an employee of the hand grenade factory in Liebenau revealed that their grenades were used in the Kurdish-Turkish conflict, which created a PR nightmare and led to the shutdown of the factory in Germany in 1993. The arms created in Germany had transited through the Netherlands before being delivered to Turkey, amid a German ban on arm trades with Turkey.

Eurometaal was a producer of M864 and M483A1 projectiles. It also had the licence to produce American DPICMs that it was producing both in Zaandam (since 1989) and in Turkey through a partnership with MKEK (since 1994). This production stopped in 2002. Following the European defense conversion program, Eurometaal successfully diversified its activities to gear to civilians, by laying off hundreds of employees and acquiring existing civil companies.

In 1999, Rheinmetall increased its stake in Eurometaal to 66%. In 2002, Rheinmetall sold Eurometaal's subsidiary Intergas (manufacturer of furnaces and boilers) and closed Eurometaal altogether.

== See also ==
- Artillerie-Inrichtingen
