= G13 =

G13 may refer to:

- G-13 (cannabis), a type of cannabis
- County Route G13 (California)
- G13 Baobab Alliance, a political alliance in Benin
- G13 carbine, a proposed Georgian firearm
- Gate 13, a group of supporters of the Greek football club Panathinaikos
- HMS G13, a Royal Navy G-class submarine
- Logitech G13, a computer keyboard
- Suzuki G13, an automobile engine
- G-13, a Swiss postwar version of the Jagdpanzer 38 Hetzer tank destroyer
- G13, a type of bi-pin lamp base
- G8+5, former international organization
