= Ruger Mini-14 =

Semi-automatic rifle

Mini-14
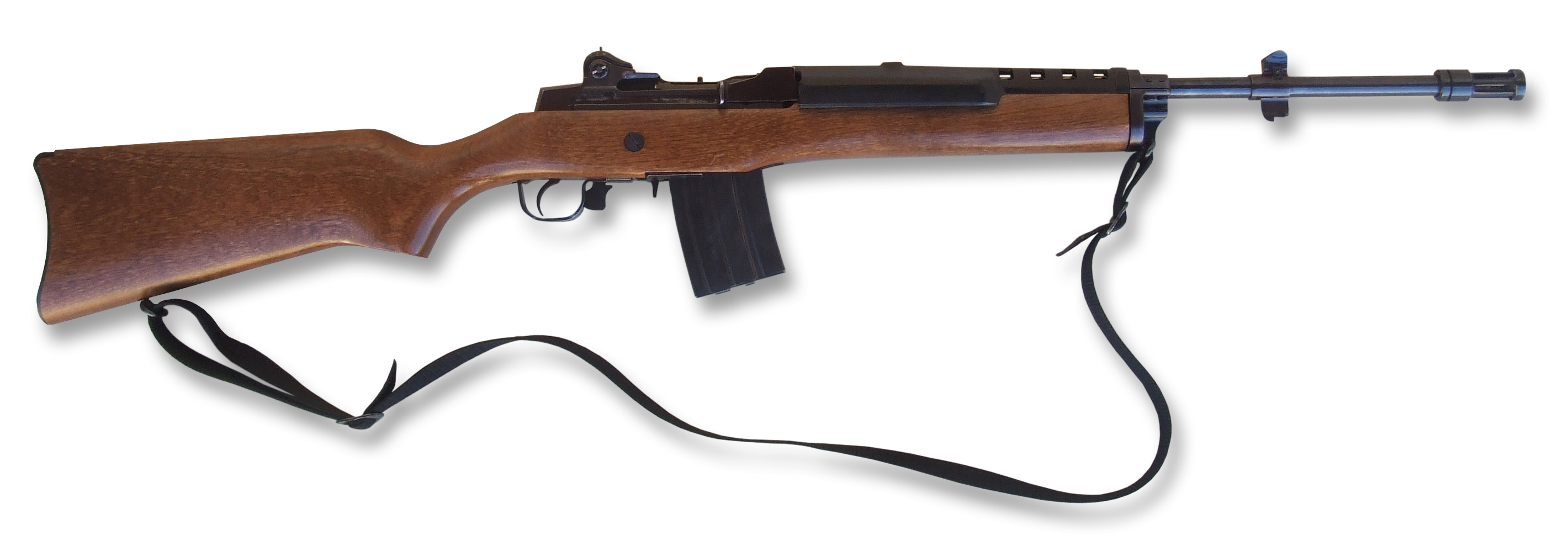
- The Mini-14 Government Barrel with sling
- Type: Semi-automatic rifle
- Place of origin: United States

Service history
- In service: 1974–present
- Used by: See Users
- Wars: Rhodesian Bush War; The Troubles; Basque conflict Militias-Comando Vermelho conflict

Production history
- Designer: L. James Sullivan, William B. Ruger
- Designed: 1967–1973
- Manufacturer: Sturm, Ruger & Co.
- Produced: 1973–present
- Variants: See Variants

Specifications
- Mass: 2.9 kg (6.4 lb)
- Length: Model 5816: 965 mm (38.0 in)
- Barrel length: 330–559 mm (13.0–22.0 in)
- Cartridge: .222 Remington; .223 Remington; .300 AAC Blackout; 5.56×45 mm NATO; 7.62×39 mm; 6.8 SPC
- Action: Gas-operated short-stroke fixed piston, rotating bolt
- Rate of fire: Semi-automatic mode: 40 rounds/min Full-automatic mode (AC-556 variant): 750 rounds/min
- Muzzle velocity: 3240 ft/s (990 m/s)
- Effective firing range: 200 yd (180 m)
- Feed system: 5- to 30-round factory box magazine Stripper clip (Cogburn Arsenal feed guide); Beta C-Mag
- Sights: Iron sights

The Mini-14 is a lightweight semi-automatic rifle manufactured by Sturm, Ruger & Co. Introduced in 1973, the design was outwardly similar to the M14 rifle and is, in appearance, a scaled-down version chambered in 5.56×45mm NATO, though with its own gas system design.

Since 1973, Ruger has introduced several variants, including variants chambered in both .223 Remington and 5.56×45mm NATO, the Ranch Rifle with a civilian style rear aperture sight and integral scope ring mounts on the receiver, the Mini-14 GB with a bayonet lug and flash suppressor, variants with folding stocks, stainless steel versions of the most popular variants, a target version featuring a heavyweight barrel and barrel tuner, the Mini Thirty, which is chambered for 7.62×39mm, as well as variants chambered in 6.8mm Remington SPC and .300 AAC Blackout. The rifle is currently used by military personnel, law enforcement, corrections personnel, and civilians in the United States and around the world.

== History and design ==
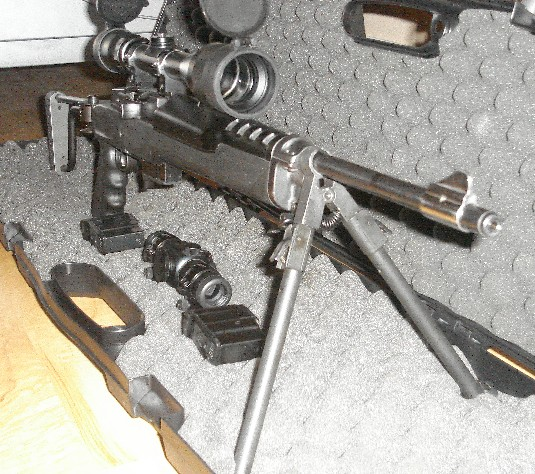
Stainless steel Mini-14 Tactical Rifle with various accessories

Introduced in 1973 by Sturm, Ruger & Co., the Mini-14 resembles a smaller version of the military M14 rifle. Designed by L. James Sullivan and William B. Ruger, it incorporated numerous innovations and cost-saving engineering changes. The Mini-14 rifle has an investment-cast, heat-treated receiver and is mechanically similar to the M1 rifle in the receiver area, but with a self-cleaning, fixed-piston gas system.

Initial rifles were produced with a complex, exposed-bolt hold-open device with no button for manual engagement. Stocks were somewhat angular, and heat shields were made of wood. These rifles, with serial number prefixes before 181, were tooled and redesigned with a new stock, new bolt hold-open mechanism, and other small changes.

The original Mini-14 rifle had a rear aperture sight with large protective wings and no integral scope bases. In 1982, Ruger introduced the Ranch Rifle with an integral scope base on the receiver, a new folding-aperture rear sight, and factory scope rings.

In 1987, Ruger introduced the Mini Thirty rifle chambered for the Soviet 7.62×39mm cartridge. At the time, large quantities of surplus military ammunition were being imported into the United States at rock-bottom prices. Also, the 7.62×39mm is ballistically similar to the .30-30 Winchester cartridge. As a result, the Mini Thirty proved to be an effective deer rifle.

In 2003, the design was overhauled to improve accuracy, update the styling, and reduce production costs. The standard Mini-14 was discontinued and the name became the family name for all Mini-14-type rifles. As of 2005, all Mini-14-type rifles are based on the Ranch Rifle design, with integral scope bases, a nonfolding ghost ring aperture rear sight, and a winged front sight similar to that used on the Ruger police carbine. They have serial numbers beginning with 580 and are sometimes referred to as 580-series Ranch Rifles. They also have a new modified gas system designed to reduce barrel vibration and can shoot two-inch groups at 100 yards, which is 2 minute of angle (MOA) accuracy.

Around 2007 or 2008, Ruger added a heavier, larger-diameter barrel visibly tapered from gas block to muzzle. These changes combined with tighter tolerances result in greater potential accuracy.

All Mini-14-type rifles are available in stainless steel or blued finish with hardwood, synthetic, or laminated stocks with 16.12-inch (409 mm) or 18.5-inch (470 mm) barrels.

== Variants ==
=== Ranch Rifle ===
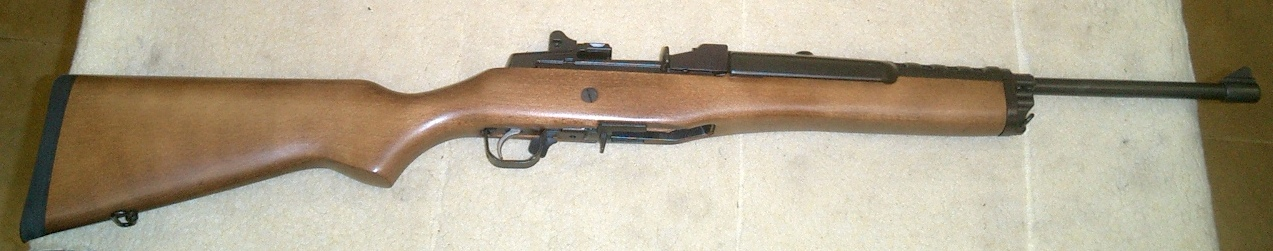
Ranch Rifle, note the scope mounts and ghost ring rear sight

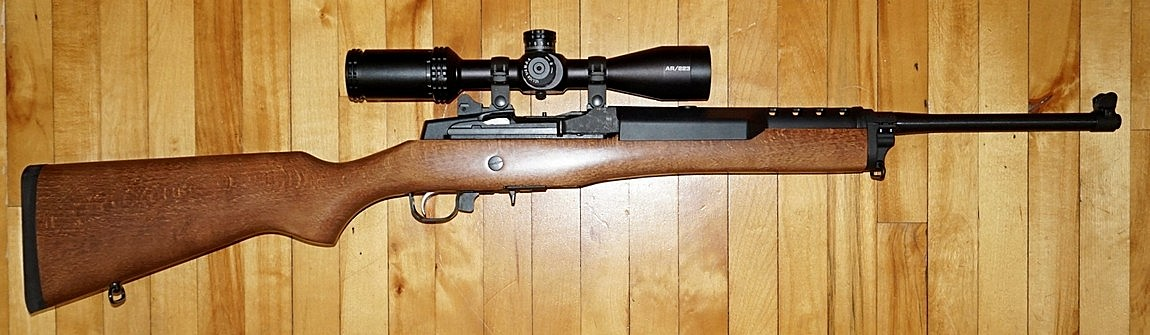
Ruger Mini-14 Ranch Rifle with a Bushnell 3-9 X 40mm rifle scope

The Ranch Rifle is a basic model offered in a wood or synthetic rifle stock paired with a blued or stainless steel receiver and a standard 18.5" tapered barrel (1:9" RH twist rate). These rifles feature an adjustable ghost ring rear sight and winged front sight, and they are sold with a detachable Picatinny scope rail mount and a choice of two 20-round or 5-round detachable box magazines to comply with some U.S. states and other countries, which have laws restricting magazine capacity. All models are chambered in both .223 Remington and 5.56×45mm NATO ammunition except the Target Rifle variant (which is .223 only).

==== Target Rifle ====
In 2007, the "Target Rifle" version was introduced with a 22-inch (560 mm) cold hammer-forged heavy barrel, adjustable harmonic tuner with adjustable MOA accuracy, and either a laminated wood or Hogue overmolded synthetic stock. The Target Rifle does not have iron sights but includes the standard scope rings and Picatinny rail mount. It is designed for use with the .223 Remington round only; 5.56 NATO is not warranted by Ruger.

==== Tactical Rifle ====
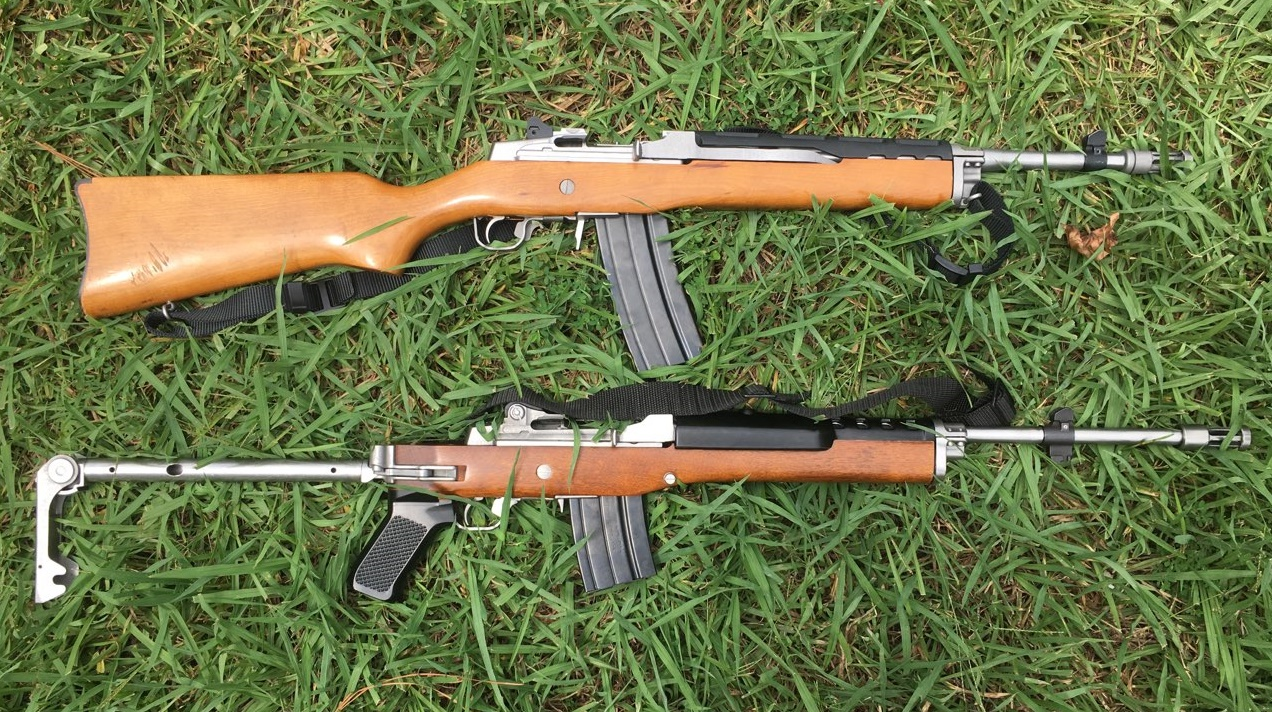
A stainless Mini-14 Tactical (top) and Mini-14 GB-F

Introduced in 2009, the "Tactical Rifle" is the newest variant, which includes the shorter 16.12" barrel with flash suppressor, and is available with a standard fixed stock/fore end, or a collapsible ATI-brand stock with Picatinny rails. This model is chambered in both .223 Remington/5.56×45mm NATO and .300 AAC Blackout as of 2015.

=== Mini Thirty ===
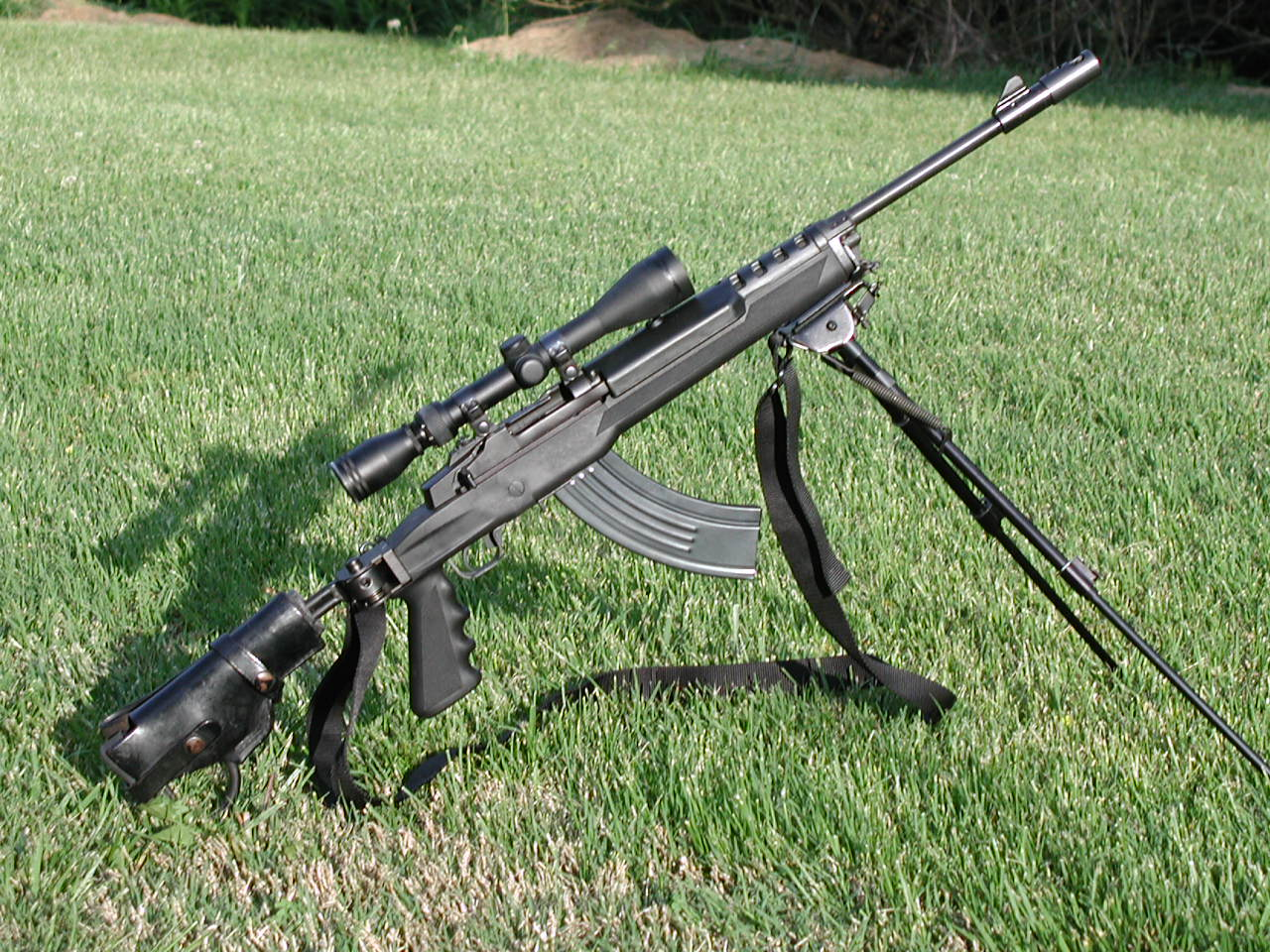
A Mini Thirty with aftermarket accessories

In 1987, Ruger began production of the Mini Thirty, which is chambered for the Russian 7.62×39mm cartridge, used in the SKS and AK-47, as many states prohibit hunting of deer with calibers smaller than 6 mm (.243 in). The 7.62×39mm has ballistics similar to the well-known .30-30 Winchester. The Mini Thirty is available with a 16.12" (Tactical Model) or 18.50" barrel having a twist rate of 1:10" RH, and is sold with two 20-round or 5-round box magazines. Ruger does not currently produce 30-round Mini Thirty magazines. The Mini Thirty shares many of the same design and accessory options with those of the smaller caliber Mini-14 Ranch Rifle.

==== Mini Thirty Tactical Rifle ====
The "Mini Thirty Tactical Rifle" variant was introduced in 2010. It closely mimics the Mini-14 Tactical Rifle variant, but in 7.62×39mm. It also has a shorter 16.12-inch barrel with flash suppressor, and is available with a standard fixed stock/fore end, or a collapsible ATI-brand stock with Picatinny rails.

=== Government models ===
==== Mini-14 GB ====
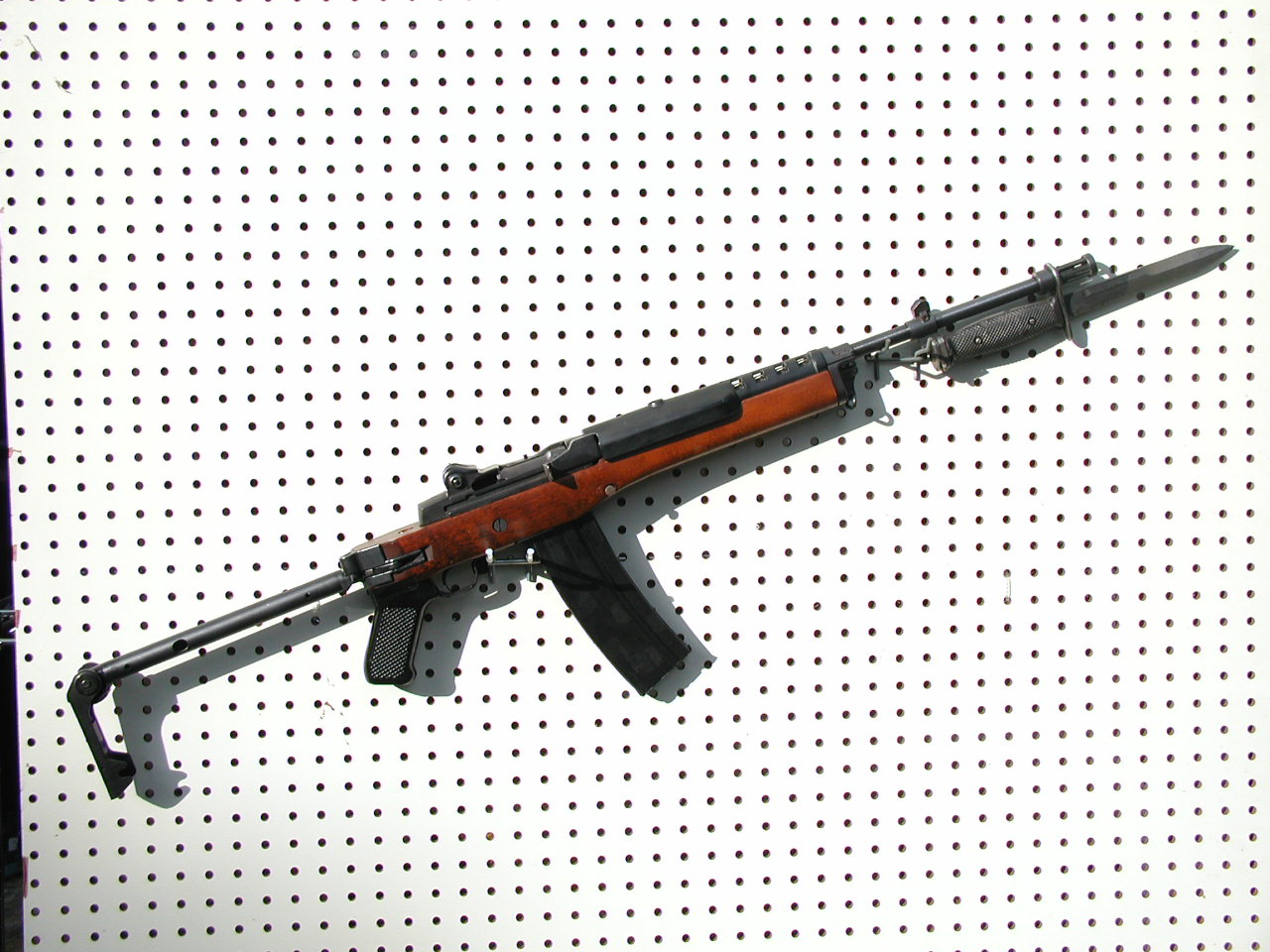
Ruger Mini-14 GB with a pistol grip, side-folding stock, 30-round magazine, bayonet lug, threaded barrel, flash suppressor, and M7 bayonet

The Mini-14 GB ("government barrel") models feature either a pistol grip, side-folding stock, or a standard semipistol grip rifle stock, a 20- or 30-round magazine, bayonet lug, threaded barrel, and flash suppressor. Proof that GB stands for "government barrel" and not "government bayonet" can be seen in Ruger's new Tactical models and Ruger continuing to use "GB", which are catalogued for example KM-14/20GBCP. These models have no bayonet lug but do have the flash hider. Sales of the models with bayonet lug were intended only for law enforcement, military, and private security markets, and could only be found in Ruger's Law Enforcement Catalog. Many have entered the civilian market, though.

==== AC-556 ====
Introduced in 1979, the AC-556 is a selective-fire version of the Mini-14 marketed for military and law-enforcement use. The design incorporates a selector on the right/rear of the receiver to select either semi-automatic, three-round burst, or full automatic fire modes; the manual safety at the front of the trigger guard operates the same as a standard Mini-14. The front sight is winged and incorporates a bayonet lug. The 13-inch (330 mm) or 18-inch (460 mm) barrel incorporates a flash suppressor, which can be used to launch approved tear-gas and smoke rifle grenades. A folding stock was used on the AC-556F and AC-556K. The rifle came equipped with 20-round magazines and a 30-round version was available for a time. The AC-556 was dropped from production in 1999 and Ruger stopped offering service for the rifle in 2009. By that time, some models became available for private civilian purchase in the NFA market.

===== Mousqueton A.M.D. =====
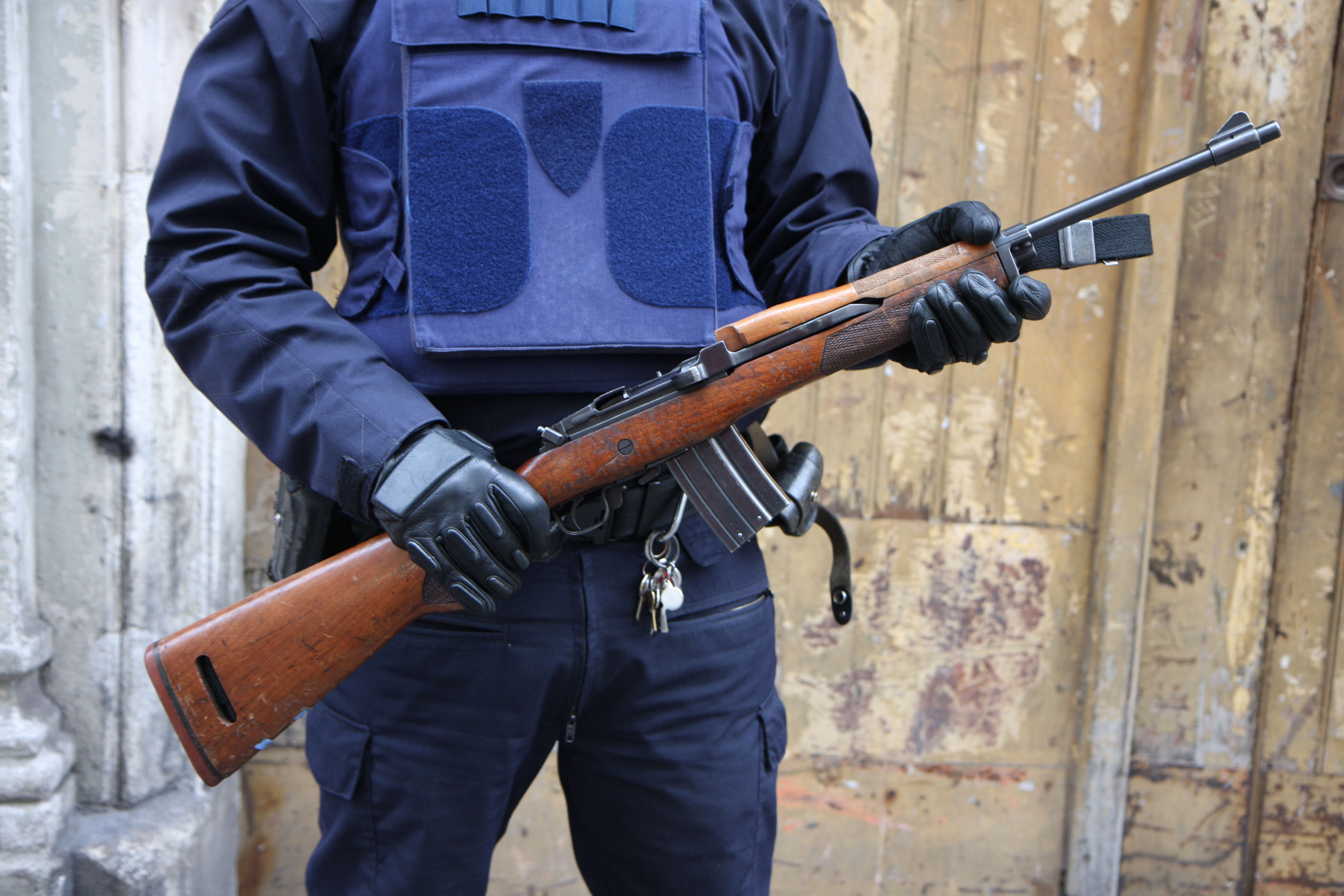
French CRS police officer with Mousqueton A.M.D. with tangent rear sight, note the selector lever at the rear of the receiver

In France, the AC-556 is known as the Mousqueton A.M.D. where it was used by several governmental agencies within the French Interior Ministry: the Police Aux Frontières ("P.A.F."—Border Police), the Police Nationale Compagnies Républicaines de Sécurité (or "C.R.S."—Riot Control Brigade), and the Groupe d'Intervention de la Gendarmerie Nationale ("GIGN") special-operations unit. The A.M.D. was made in two versions, the first has the standard Ruger aperture rear sight. On the other, the aperture rear sight has been completely removed and replaced with a tangent rear sight located on top of the barrel just forward of the receiver.

=== Straight-pull action ===
A small number of straight-pull only (or bolt-action only) Mini-14 and Mini Thirty rifles were manufactured for sale in the United Kingdom as a result of legislation that banned semi-automatic centerfire rifles in 1988.

=== Other calibers and accessories ===
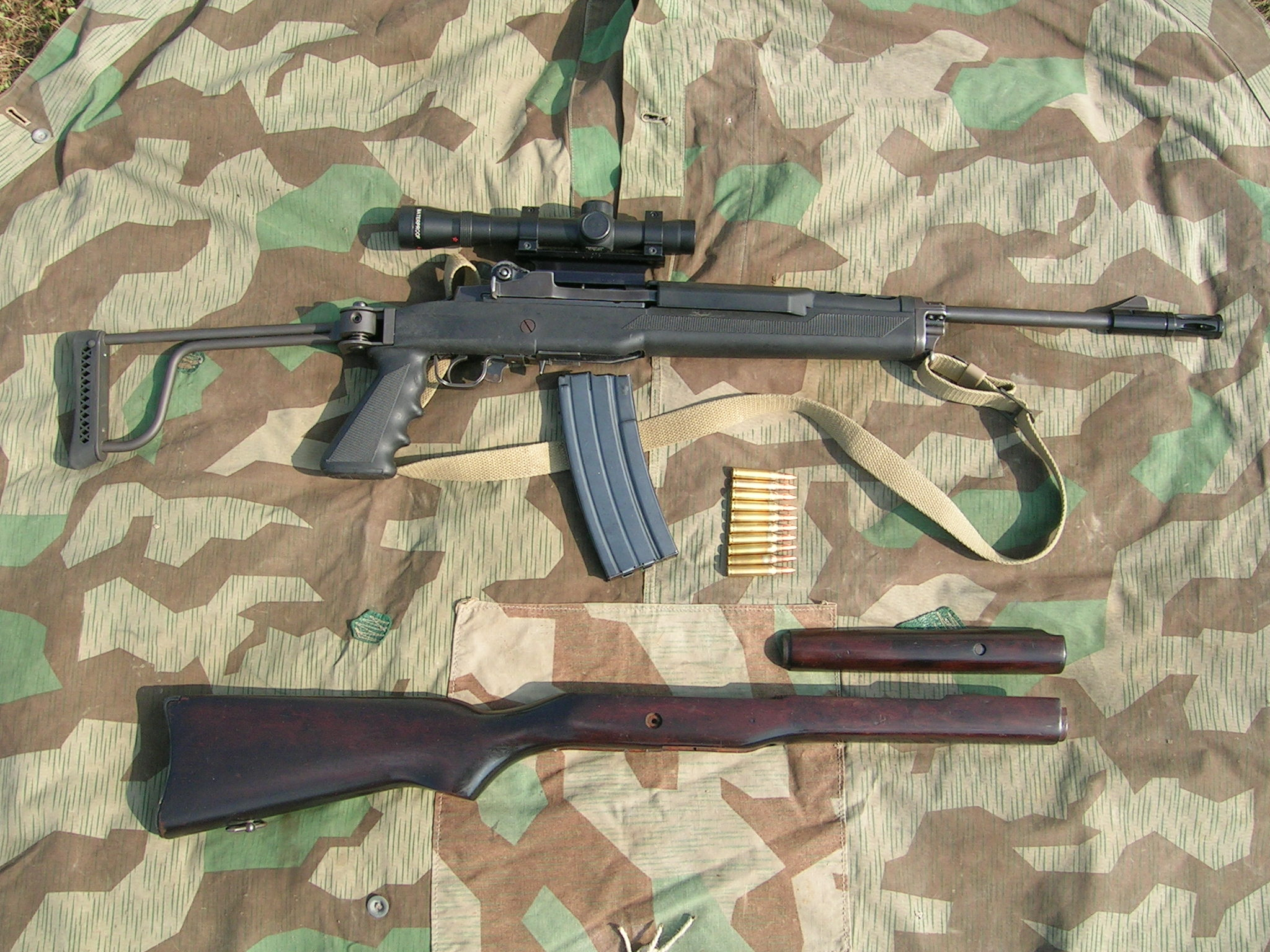
Mini-14 with various accessories

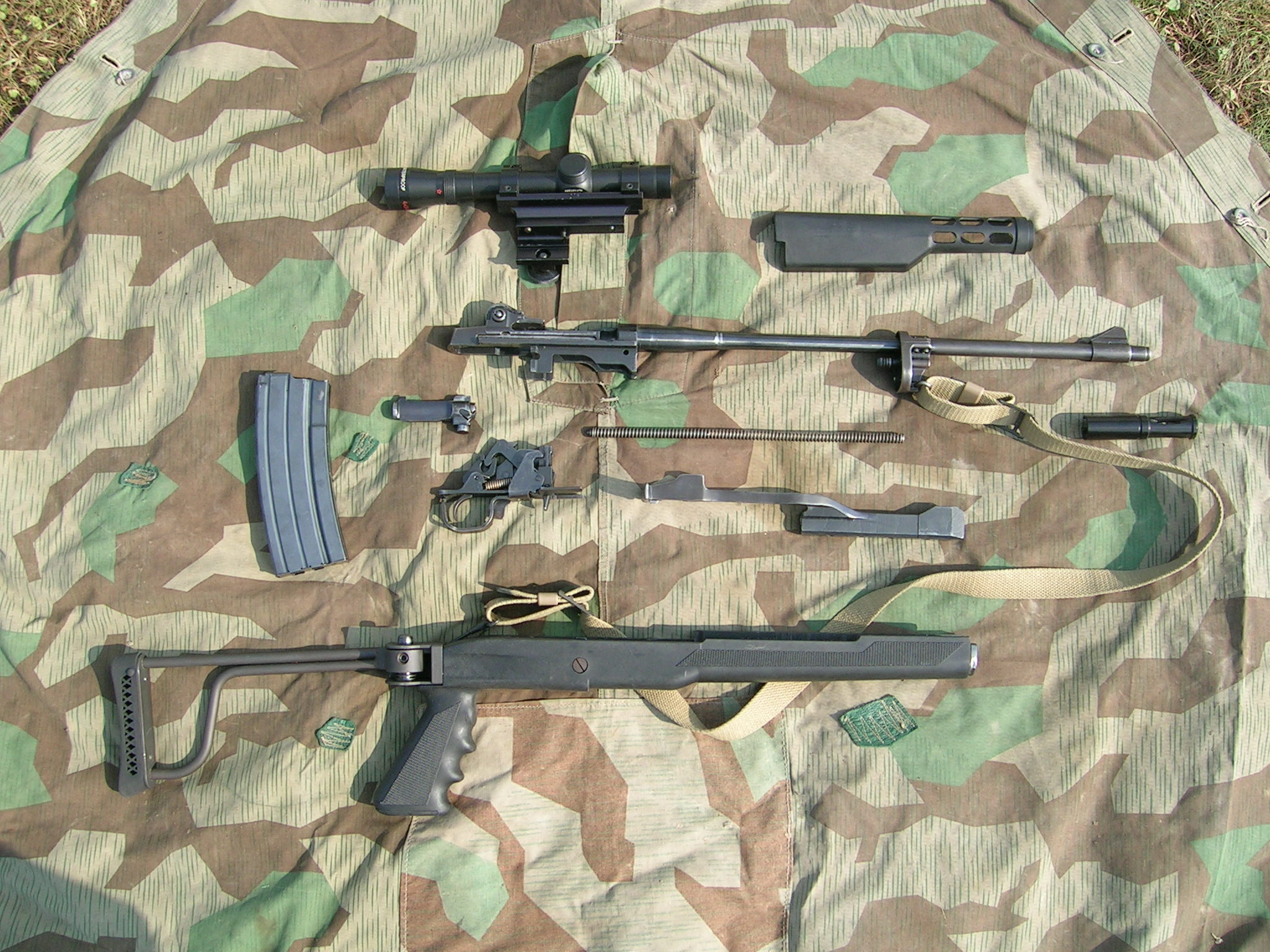
Disassembled Mini-14 with various accessories

==== .222 Remington ====
Ruger produced a .222 Remington caliber model as early as 1984. Designated Mini-14/5R.222, these rifles were made mostly for civilian markets overseas where .223 caliber and 5.56 mm firearms are generally banned. These were discontinued in the early 1980s.

==== 6.8 mm Remington ====
In 2007, Ruger began production of the Mini-6.8 using the commercial 6.8 mm Remington SPC cartridge. However, they were discontinued in 2012 and are no longer listed in the Ruger catalog.

==== Accessories ====
A wide range of aftermarket accessories are available for the Mini-14 and Mini Thirty, including numerous stocks, magazines, and Weaver and Picatinny rail mounts.

== Users ==
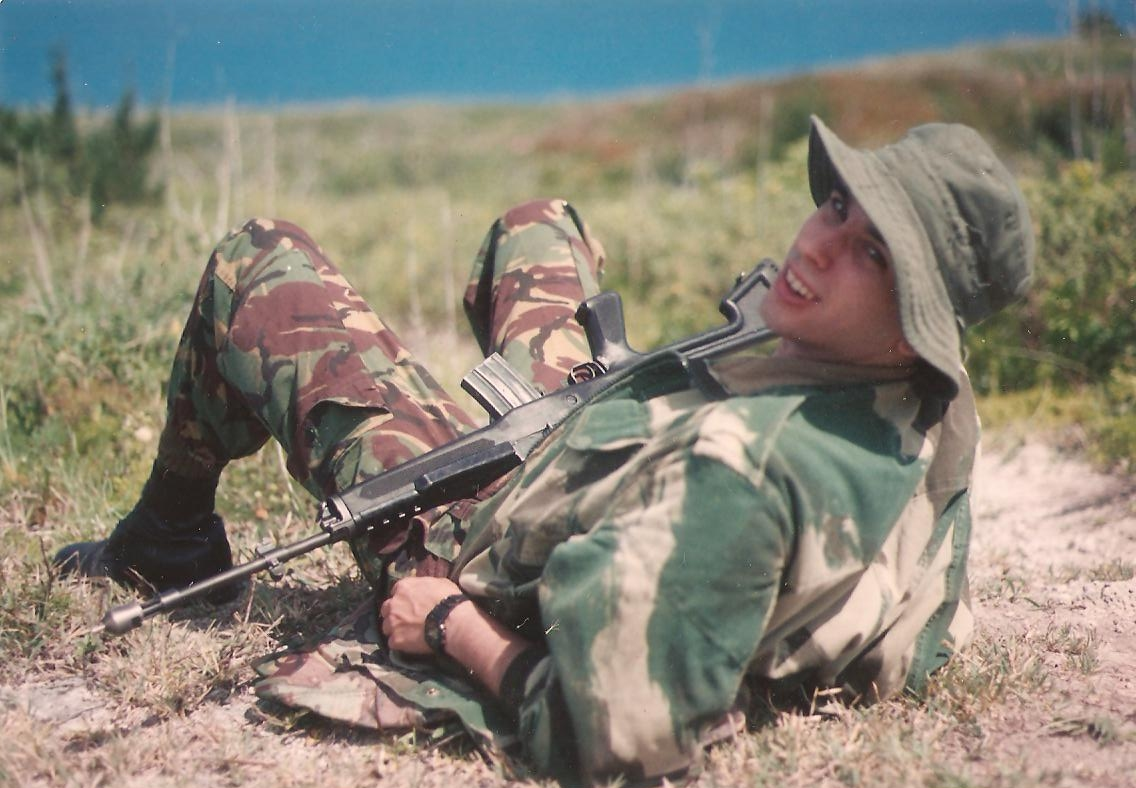
Royal Bermuda Regiment soldier armed with a Mini-14 GB in 1994.

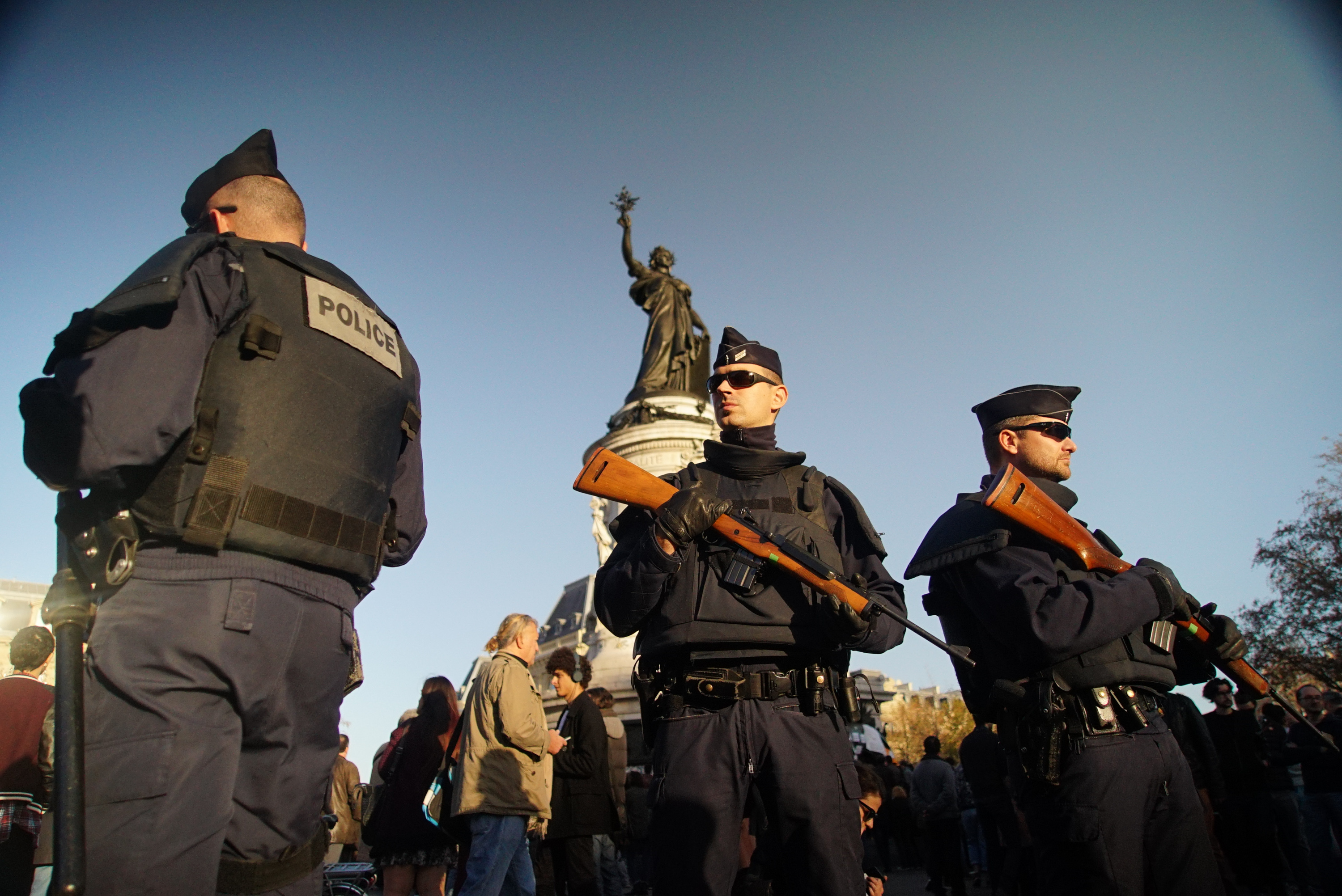
French police armed with Mousqueton A.M.D. rifles.

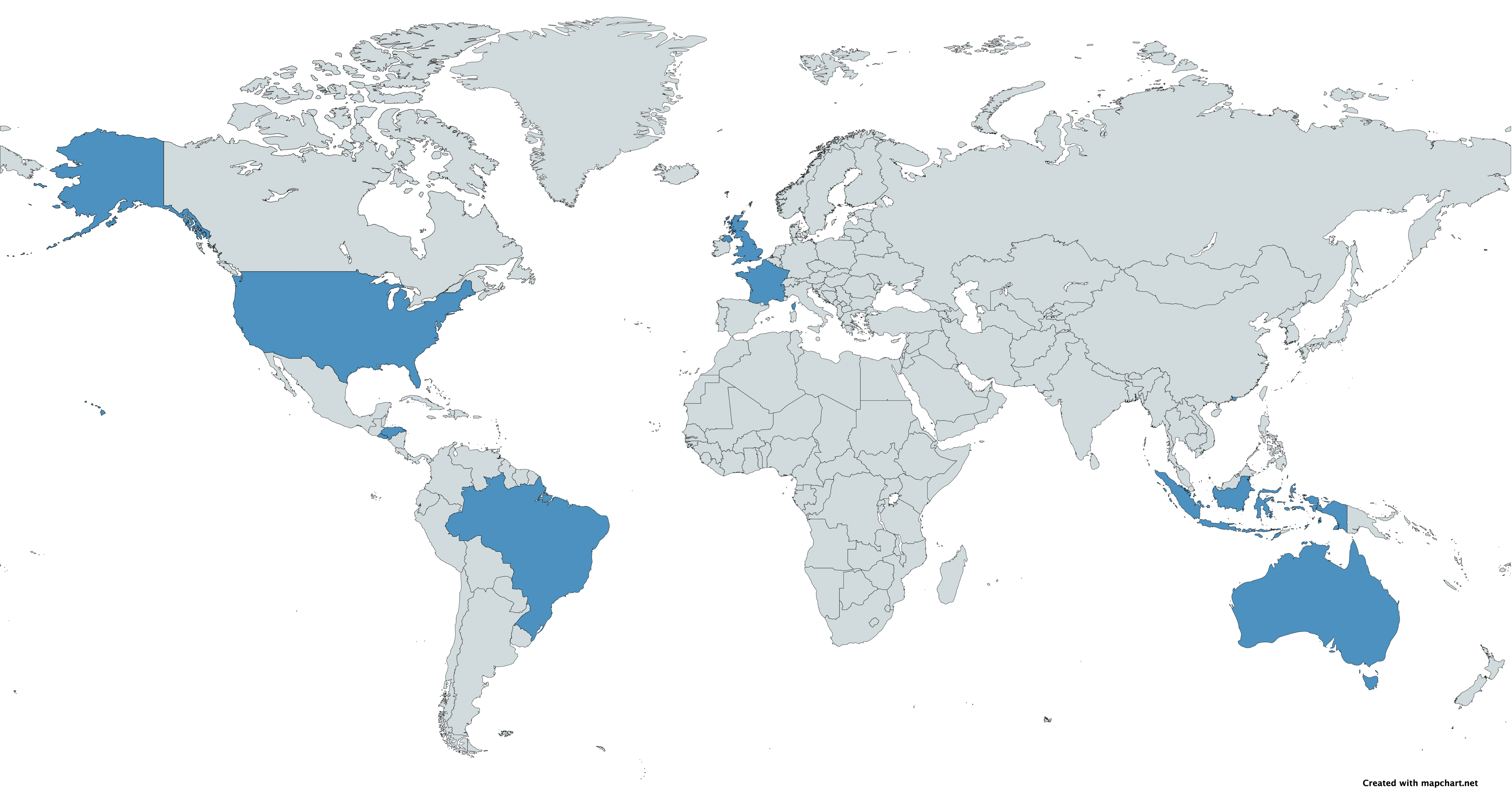
Map with Ruger Mini-14 users in blue.

- Australia: Currently used by the New South Wales Department of Corrective Services.
- Brazil: Used by some police agencies. The Rio de Janeiro Civil Police uses the folding stock variant.
- El Salvador: Mini-14GB and AC-556 used by the National Civil Police.
- France: Mousqueton A.M.D. variant used by French police forces (Police Aux Frontières, GIGN, CRS).
- Honduras
- Hong Kong: Used by the Hong Kong Police Force Hit Team and Hong Kong Correctional Services.
- Indonesia: Used by Indonesian National Police.
- United Arab Emirates: Customs Police, folding stock.
- United States:
  - The Mini-14 is the main rifle used by the California Department of Corrections and Rehabilitation, and the North Carolina Department of Correction.
  - The Nevada Department of Corrections uses the Mini-14.
  - US Marines that serve as guards at certain US embassies are sometimes issued Mini-14s.
  - Delta Force has some Mini-14s in inventory.

=== Former ===
- Rhodesia: Used by Rhodesian security forces during the Rhodesian Bush War.
- United Kingdom: The Royal Ulster Constabulary had used the AC-556 model prior to its inventory being destroyed by 1995. The Surrey Constabulary Firearms Support Team (now known as the Tactical Firearms Unit) was armed with Mini-14s in the 1980s modified with folding stocks.
  - Bermuda: The Royal Bermuda Regiment has used the Mini-14GB/20 as its standard service rifle since 1983, replacing the L1A1 Self-Loading Rifle. Original wooden stocks were replaced with Choate black plastic stocks about 1990. The regiment received L85A2 rifles in August, 2015, and the Ruger was phased out in January, 2016.
- United States:
  - Mini-14s were used by the New York City Police Department Emergency Service Unit with mostly 13 inch barrels, factory flash hiders and AC556 gas block front sights in both standard and folding stocks, the rifles eventually being replaced by the M4 carbine.
    - The NYPD's Organized Crime Control Bureau was armed with the Mini-14.

=== Non-state users ===
- The Rajneeshpuram Peace Force employed some Mini-14s in addition to IMI Galils and Uzis.

== Criminal use ==
The Ruger Mini-14 was used in several notable crimes:

- One of the shooters in the 1986 FBI Miami shootout used a Ruger Mini-14, which resulted in FBI agents and other American law-enforcement agencies adopting stronger body armor and discarding revolvers in favor of higher-capacity, magazine fed handguns.
- Marc Lépine used a Mini-14 in the École Polytechnique massacre, resulting in the Canada Firearms Act in 1995 and new police response procedures.
- On July 22, 2011, Anders Behring Breivik used a legally acquired Mini-14 semi-automatic carbine and a Glock pistol during the 2011 Norway attacks, methodically killing 69 people at a youth summer camp on the island of Utøya, following a car bombing in Oslo that killed eight people. The attack at Utøya is the deadliest mass shooting by a lone gunman in modern history. The attacks triggered intensive public and governmental debate regarding firearm availability, leading a national review panel to recommend strict bans on semi-automatic weapons. In 2021, Norway moved to implement comprehensive prohibitions targeting certain categories of semi-automatic rifles, phasing in tighter legislative restrictions on civilian ownership of these firearms.
- An illegally obtained Ruger Mini-14 was used along with several other firearms in the 2020 Nova Scotia attacks. This resulted in the reclassification of the Mini-14 and at least 1,500 models and variants of other "assault-style" firearms as prohibited firearms in the May 2020 Order in Council.

== See also ==
- List of carbines
- List of semi-automatic rifles
- Ruger XGI: 7.62x51mm NATO variant of the Mini-14
