= Hembrug =

Coordinates: 52°25′11″N 4°49′40″E

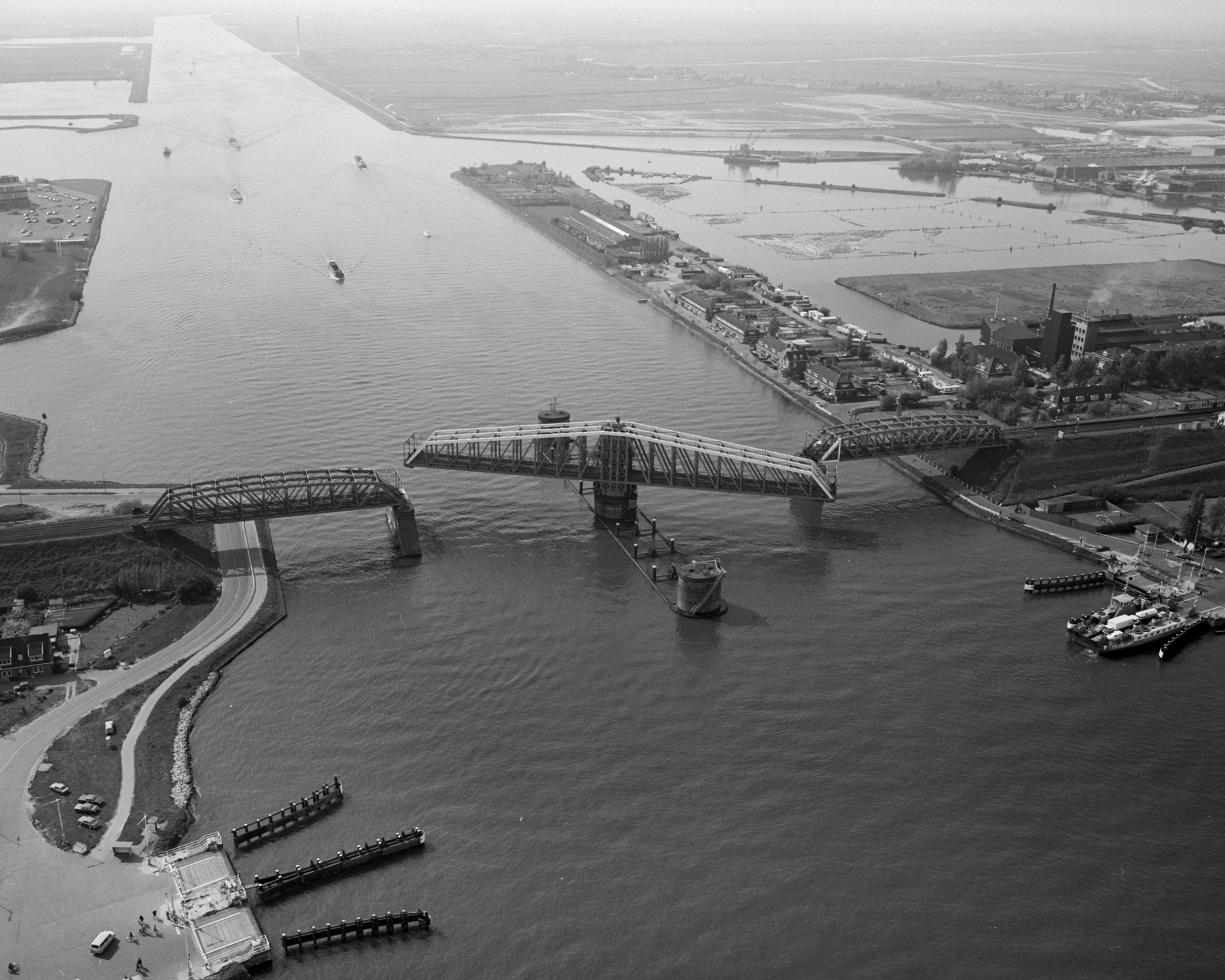
Hembrug c. 1978

The name Hembrug refers to various geographic entities in the municipality of Zaanstad, in the Netherlands.

== Area ==
The area called Hembrug was formerly a hem, that is, a headland later diked in to become part of a polder. Originally called De Hem, it later became named after the bridge across the North Sea Canal; see below.

== Bridge ==
The Hembrug is the name given to a swing bridge built in 1878 to carry the railroad between Amsterdam and Zaandam in the Netherlands across the North Sea Canal, and to its replacement, a longer and higher bridge built between 1903 and 1907, after the canal had been widened to cater for an increase in ship traffic. The newer bridge was approached by a long embankment, to enable the railroad to reach deck level on a moderate grade or slope.

During World War II, the bridge, which provided railroad access to the northern part of Holland, was rigged with demolition charges by the Germans, who loaded the central pier with 400 boxes, each containing 3 kilograms of explosives. Twice those explosives were removed by Dutch resistance operatives: on the night of 26 September 1944, two members of the local swimming team, Jaap Boll and Remmert Aten, dived down and got into the central pier by way of an underwater opening, and removed the explosives. The Germans discovered that the explosives had been removed when they saw packaging material floating around, so Remmert Aten swam down a second time, after the explosives had been replaced.

The operation of the bridge was twice disrupted by ships colliding with it. On 20 October 1974, Santa Fe Construction's semi-submersible derrick lay barge Choctaw II caused damage which was not completely repaired.

The bridge was made obsolete by the construction of the Hemtunnel, which became operational in 1983. On 27 May 1983 the last train passed over the bridge. Denied the status of Rijksmonument, the spans were removed later that year, and the bridge piers felled by explosives in the spring of 1985.

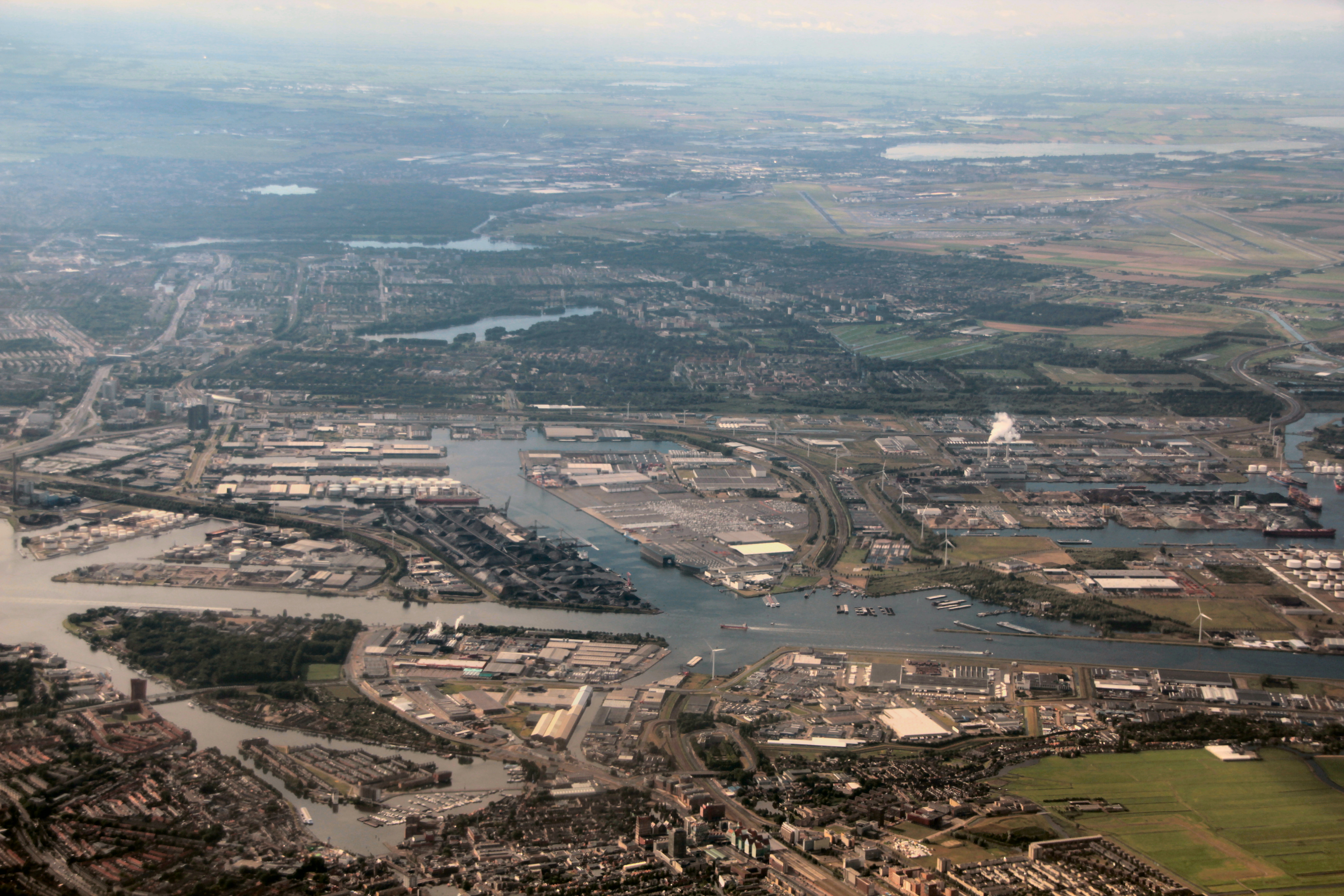
The ship in the center of the image is almost exactly where the Hemtunnel is now situated.

== Train station ==
From 1907 until 1982, Hembrug was the name of a halt on the railroad line north of the bridge, built for the employees of three factories: the Artillerie-Inrichtingen (a State-owned munitions factory, in operation under various names since the 17th century), the Norit factory (which made activated carbon), and Bruynzeel (doors and kitchens). Busy in the early morning and the evening with workers, the station was almost deserted during the day. It was opened on 1 January 1907 and originally had a station master. Latterly Hembrug became an unstaffed halt, with wooden shelters on each of the two platforms. Services to the halt ceased on 23 May 1982. In 1983, the part of the station was moved to Krommenie and converted to a garage.
