= SureFire ICAR =

SureFire Intermediate Combat Advanced Rifle (ICAR)
- Type: Semi-automatic rifle
- Place of origin: United States

Service history
- In service: 2026-present

Production history
- Designer: SureFire, LLC
- Designed: 2023
- Manufacturer: SureFire, LLC

Specifications
- Mass: 7.3 lb (3.31 kg)
- Length: 36.5" (Maximum), 33.5" (Minimium)
- Cartridge: 6mm ARC
- Barrels: 16.1", 1:7.5" Twist, 32CroMoV12-10 Steel Alloy, Ferritic Nitrocarburized
- Action: Internal Gas Piston, Rotating Bolt
- Feed system: Box-Magazine, 25-round Magpul ICAR PMAG
- Sights: Picatinny rail for iron sights and electro-optics

The SureFire Intermediate Combat Advanced Rifle (ICAR) is a magazine-fed, gas-operated rifle developed by SureFire, LLC. It is chambered in 6mm ARC and designed to address the functional deficiencies of running 6mm ARC in AR-pattern rifles designed for 5.56x45mm NATO.

== Development & Design ==
The development of the SureFire ICAR traces its roots back to SureFire's collaboration with firearms designer, L. James Sullivan on the Advanced Rifle Operating Core (AROC) in the mid to late-2010s. This was a internal upgrade to existing M4-pattern rifles to substantially increase the controllability and reliability of the weapon. This core featured bolt lugs that were 30% longer than the M4 TDP specification as well as a lengthened bolt carrier system to increase dwell time.

In 2023, SureFire adapted the design principles from the AROC into the creation of the ICAR. Much like the AROC, the ICAR features longer bolt lugs, barrel extension, and a modified cam path. This effectively eliminates the issue of stunted bolt life seen in drop-in 6mm ARC bolts for commercial off-the-shelf AR-15 rifles. Another deficiency that the ICAR addresses is magazine reliability. Due to the 6ARC's wider cartridge case, it has been shown have feeding issues in standard 5.56 rifles. SureFire addressed this by developing a lower receiver with a wider magazine well to fully accommodate the 6ARC cartridge. SureFire partnered with Magpul to create the PMAG 25 ICAR magazine, the first magazine designed specifically for 6mm ARC. The PMAG 25 ICAR is a derivative of Magpul's 6.8mm SPC magazine that was originally designed for LWRCI's Six8 family of rifles.

Unveiled to the public in 2025, the ICAR is reportedly undergoing test and evaluation by Joint Special Operations Command as part of their medium-range assault rifle program.
