= 1672 in the Netherlands =

Events from the year 1672 in the Dutch Republic

== Event ==
  - January: Rampjaar
  - 7th June: Battle of Solebay
  - 9th June: Siege of groenlo
  - 22 July: Siege of Groningen

== Deaths ==
- January 21 – Adriaen van de Velde, painter (b. 1636)
- August 20
  - Cornelis de Witt, politician (b. 1623)
  - Johan de Witt, politician (b. 1625)
- October 8 – Johan Nieuhof, traveler who wrote about his journeys to Brazil (b. 1618)
- November 16 – Esaias Boursse, painter (b. 1631)
- November 19 – Franciscus Sylvius, physician and scientist (b. 1614)
- December 30 – Hendrick Bloemaert, painter (b. 1601)
