= L. James Sullivan =

American firearms inventor (1933–2024)

Leroy James Sullivan
- Born: June 27, 1933; Nome, Alaska, U.S.
- Died: September 22, 2024 (aged 91); United States
- Other name: Jim Sullivan
- Education: University of Washington
- Occupation: Small arms designer
- Known for: M16 rifle; Ruger Mini-14; Ultimax 100

Leroy James Sullivan (June 27, 1933 – September 22, 2024) was an American firearms inventor. Going by Jim Sullivan, he designed several "scaled-down" versions of larger firearms.

== Early life ==
Sullivan was born on June 27, 1933, in Nome, Alaska. Sullivan lived in Nome until he was seven years old, concerned that World War II would spread to Alaska, Sullivan's family moved to Seattle, Washington.

== Education ==
Sullivan attended the public schools of Seattle, and later in Kennewick, Washington. Sullivan went on to study engineering, for two years, at the University of Washington in Seattle. Aware that he was about to be drafted to fight in the Korean War Sullivan wanted to become an Army diver, so he left the University of Washington to attend the Sparling School of Deep Sea Diving in Long Beach, California.

== Military service ==
Sullivan served in the US Army, from 1953 to 1955, although he was trained by the Army to be a telephone installer and repairman. Due to his civilian training he went overseas to Korea in 1954, where he was assigned by the Army to be a diver to repair oil pipelines and other facilities damaged during the US invasion of Inchon Harbor.

== Small arms designer ==
Sullivan is notably responsible for the Ultimax 100 light machine gun and the SureFire MGX. He also contributed to the Ruger M77 rifle, M16, Stoner 63, and Ruger Mini-14 rifles (scaled from the AR-10, Stoner 62, and M14 rifle respectively).

=== Ruger Mini-14 ===
In 1967, Sullivan was hired by Ruger to develop the Mini-14 rifle. The impetus of the Mini-14 came from Bill Ruger and the advent of 5.56x45mm NATO as a military cartridge. Ruger wanted to capitalize on this by developing a semi-automatic version of the M14 chambered for the new round. Though primarily developed for the civilian market, the Mini-14 was designed to be a select-fire weapon to garner military interest. It utilizes the same design principles as the M14, but was re-designed to be made with cast components which were standard for Ruger's production processes at the time. Though not adopted en masse by the U.S. military, numerous countries around the world adopted the Mini-14; particularly for law enforcement applications. The Mini-14 remains an extremely popular rifle in civilian markets and has been in production since its release in 1973.

=== Armwest LLC M4 ===
In 2014, Sullivan was interviewed regarding his contributions to the M16/M4 family of rifles while working for Armalite. A noted critic of the M4, he illustrated the deficiencies found in the rifle's current configuration. In the video, he demonstrated his "Arm West LLC Modified M4", with enhancements he believed were necessary to rectify the issues with the weapon. The Armwest Modified M4 borrowed features from Sullivan's previous designs, particularly the Ultimax. A unique feature of the Modified M4 is that it fires from the closed bolt in semi-automatic firing and switches to open bolt in fully automatic, which improves accuracy. The weight of the cyclic components of the gun were doubled while keeping the weapon's overall weight under eight pounds. Compared to the standard M4, which in automatic fires 750-950 rounds per minute, the rate of fire of the Armwest M4 is significantly reduced to both save ammunition and reduce barrel wear. The reduced rate also renders the weapon more controllable and accurate in automatic firing.

=== Armwest/SureFire Advanced Rifle Operating Core (AROC) ===
In 2012, Sullivan filed a patent for a modified operating "core" for the M4 carbine. It was dubbed the Advanced Rifle Operating Core (AROC) and featured several changes to the M4's technical data package (TDP). Sullivan's AROC consisted of a new upper receiver, bolt carrier group, as well as recoil spring and buffer - all of which can be used with existing M16/M4 lower receivers. The AROC's bolt lugs are 30% longer than M16 TDP specifications, making them twice as strong as a standard mil-spec bolt. Although requiring a proprietary barrel extension, the increased length reduces the steep feed ramp angle as found in a standard M4. This results in smoother and more reliable feeding of ammunition. The AROC bolt carrier has an additional .400" of travel into the receiver extension, requiring a shortened buffer. Along with the additional bolt carrier travel, the AROC featured a spring-loaded weight in the rear of the carrier that acts as a counter weight to increase dwell time. This reduces the cyclic rate to 590-610 rounds per minute, depending on ammunition. These changes make the weapon easy to control on fully-automatic fire. They also increase both the accuracy and overall effectiveness of the weapon. The AROC's bolt also features interlocking inconel gas rings that are effectively indestructible in the context of the weapon's service life. The AROC also featured a heavy duty gas tube to handle full automatic fire. The delayed unlocking of the bolt reduces carbon fouling, allowing the AROC to fire thousands of rounds without cleaning or lubrication.

In 2016, Sullivan licensed the AROC's bolt carrier group technology to SureFire as a drop-in upgrade for standard AR-15 pattern rifles. Sold as the SureFire Optimized Bolt Carrier (OBC), it features the modified cam path, gas key, and proprietary buffer system of the AROC. However, it lacks the longer bolt lugs and inconel gas rings.

In 2017, Sullivan wrote a letter to then Commandant of the U.S. Marine Corps, Robert Neller offering the AROC to the USMC. This was in response to an article published by the Marine Corp Times in which Neller expressed interest in finding improved infantry rifles to replace the M4. In the letter, Sullivan promoted the AROC as a single weapon to replace the M4 Carbine, M249 SAW, and Heckler & Koch M27. Along with the letter, Sullivan included a DVD showing relevance and proof to his claims.

In 2020, SureFire partnered with Geissele Automatics to make a weapons platform combining the AROC operating system with Geissele's 'Super Duty' rifle. In 2022, the joint SureFire-Geissele AROC rifle was reportedly selected by the U.S. Army's Delta Force to replace their inventory of Heckler & Koch HK416s. However, due to contract disputes between SureFire and Geissele, the rifles were never delivered. The SIG Sauer MCX Spear LT, which was the runner-up in the competition, was selected instead.

In 2023, SureFire adapted the design principles from the AROC into the creation of the Intermediate Combat Advanced Rifle (ICAR), an AR-pattern rifle chambered in 6mm ARC. Unveiled to the public in 2025, the SureFire ICAR is reportedly undergoing test and evaluation by Joint Special Operations Command as part of their medium-range assault rifle program. Much like the AROC, the ICAR features longer bolt lugs, barrel extension, and a modified cam path. This effectively eliminates the issue of stunted bolt life seen in drop-in 6mm ARC bolts for commercial off-the-shelf AR-15 rifles.

== Death ==
Sullivan died on September 22, 2024, at the age of 91.
