= Ultimax 100 =

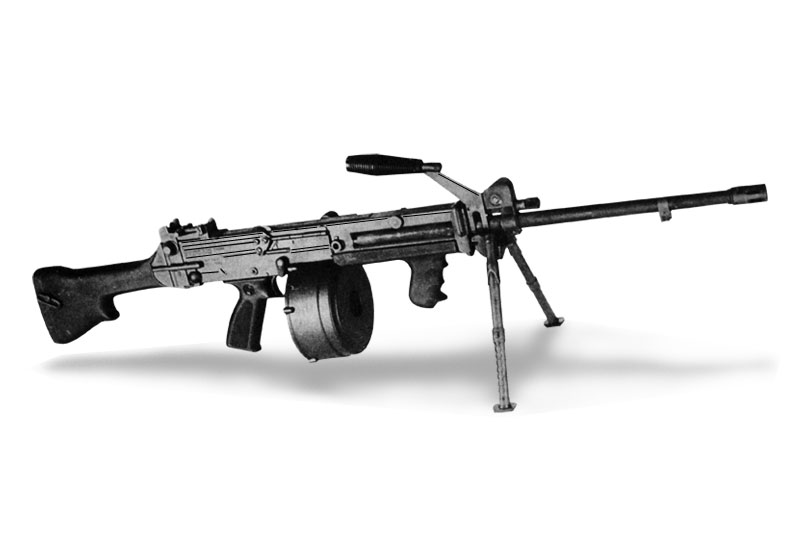
- Ultimax 100 Section Automatic Weapon (SAW)
- Type: Light machine gun, Squad automatic weapon
- Place of origin: Singapore

Service history
- In service: 1982–present
- Used by: See Users
- Wars: Sri Lankan Civil War; Bougainville conflict Yugoslav Wars; Anti-guerrilla operations in Indonesia & the Philippines; 2006 Fijian coup d'état Solomon Islands coup War in Afghanistan

Production history
- Designer: L. James Sullivan for Chartered Industries of Singapore (CIS, now ST Kinetics)
- Designed: 1978
- Manufacturer: CIS: 1982–2000; ST Kinetics: 2000–present
- Produced: 1982–present
- No. built: ~80,000
- Variants: See variants

Specifications
- Mass: Mark 2: 4.75 kg (10.47 lb); Mark 3: 4.90 kg (10.8 lb); 6.8 kg (15 lb) when loaded 100 rounds
- Length: Mark 2: 1,030 mm (40.6 in) with buttstock, 800 mm (31.5 in) w/o buttstock; Mark 3: 1,024 mm (40.3 in) with buttstock, 810 mm (31.9 in) w/o buttstock
- Barrel length: Standard: 508 mm (20.0 in); Ultimax 100 para: 330 mm (13.0 in)
- Cartridge: 5.56×45mm NATO
- Caliber: 5.56 mm (0.22 in)
- Barrels: Single barrel (progressive RH parabolic twist, 6 grooves)
- Action: Gas-operated, rotating bolt
- Rate of fire: 400–600 rounds/min
- Muzzle velocity: 970 m/s (3,182 ft/s) (M193 cartridge); 945 m/s (3,100.4 ft/s) (SS109/M855 cartridge)
- Effective firing range: 100–1,200 m sight adjustments
- Maximum firing range: 460 m (M193 cartridge); 1,300 m (SS109/M855 cartridge)
- Feed system: 100-round drum magazine or 30-round STANAG M16 box magazine Mark 9: belt-fed or STANAG magazine
- Sights: Rear aperture sight and front post 472 mm (18.6 in) sight radius

The Ultimax 100 is a Singapore-made 5.56mm light machine gun, developed by the Chartered Industries of Singapore (CIS) by a team of engineers under the guidance of American firearms designer L. James Sullivan. It is currently produced by ST Kinetics, a merger between CIS and ST Auto. The weapon is extremely accurate due to its constant-recoil operating system and is one of the lightest machine guns in the world.

Work on a new light support weapon for the Singapore Army began in 1978. The weapon is produced by CIS, initially in the Mark 1 version, later—the Mark 2, and currently, in the Mark 3 and Mark 4 variant. The Ultimax 100 (also called the U 100) is used in significant numbers by the armed forces of Singapore, Croatia and the Philippines. The Mark 3 variant is currently used in the Singapore Armed Forces primarily as a support arm, and is both classified and known by soldiers as the SAW (Section Automatic Weapon).

== Design details ==
The Ultimax 100 is a gas-operated automatic weapon (capable of fully automatic fire only) with a short-stroke gas piston operating system powered by ignited powder gases diverted from the barrel through a port in the gas block. The Ultimax 100 is a locked breech weapon with a rotating bolt that contains seven locking lugs. It fires from an open bolt position. The bolt contains both a spring extractor and a casing ejector. The weapon's non-reciprocating cocking handle is located on the left side of the receiver and occupies the forward position during firing. The Ultimax 100 is striker-fired.

The feature that grants the weapon its low recoil (compared to similar light machine guns) is the "constant recoil" principle. The overall design allows the bolt carrier group to travel all the way back without ever impacting the rear, instead stopping gradually along the axis of movement against the resistance of the return springs. Jane's International Defence Review correspondent—Andrew Tillman, in an exclusive invitation from ST Kinetics to participate in the Product Improvement Program (PIP, initiated in 1989) to test fire the gun, elaborated:

This article began by praising the Ultimax for its ease of control, which allows accurate fire. A comment to the author by an experienced SEAL team leader aptly underlines the importance of having an accurate light machine gun: "Men react one of two ways when they are shot at. If you just shoot at them, they will take cover and return fire, but if you start hitting them, they withdraw."

The magazine catch consists of two tapered pins on a bar, controlled by the magazine release button. The machine gun feeds from a proprietary 100-round synthetic drum magazine (early models also used 60-round drum magazines), or from a modified 20 or 30-round STANAG 4179 magazine (from the M16 rifle). An unusual feature among modern machine guns is the fact the Ultimax was purposely designed to feed from magazines as opposed to belts.

The Ultimax 100 uses a manual safety mechanism that consists of a lever installed on the left side of the receiver (just behind the trigger) with two possible settings: "S", indicating the weapon is safe, and "F", continuous fire. An internal safety achieved through the proper arrangement of parts and mechanisms secures against premature detonation. The light machine gun was also designed to mount an M16-type bayonet and either day or night-time optics. The Ultimax 100's ergonomics are similar to that of the Thompson submachine gun, specifically the forward grip.

Widespread adoption of the design might have been compromised by its feed system. The original Ultimax 100 was meant to be used with a drum magazine holding 100 rounds. The drum magazine was bulky and difficult to reload without a special mechanism. The shape of the drum magazine also occupied more space compared to M16 magazines or the FN Minimi box holding a belt of 200 rounds. The machine gunner also could not take magazines from other squad members who were equipped with M16s.

M16 magazines were subsequently modified to allow them to be used with the production model Ultimax 100. This was done by drilling two holes right at the left feeding lip of the magazine. This improved the handiness of the weapon and allowed magazines to be loaded in the field.

The system was modified to use only STANAG compatible magazines in the Mk 4 version of the design, which was submitted for the USMC Infantry Automatic Rifle competition. This meant the original drum could no longer be used, making the design closer to the IAR than a light machine gun. This has been rectified in the latest Mk 5 variant which allows the usage of the Beta C-Mag.

== Variants ==
- Mark 1: Model with a quick-change barrel (pre-production).
- Mark 2: Equipped with a fixed barrel.
- Mark 3/3A: Quick-change barrel. Currently the Mark 3 variant is available in two different barrel lengths, a standard and short. The short barrel is designed for use with paratroopers and special forces. There is also an optional 10.5-inch (270 mm) VIP protection barrel. The barrel on all versions has a slotted flash suppressor and a carrying handle used to transport the weapon and assist in barrel removal. The Ultimax Mark 3 has a three-position gas regulator (early models had a five-position gas adjustment valve) that allows the rate of fire to be controlled and enables reliable operation in various environmental conditions. The gas regulator is usually pre-adjusted prior to operations. Where there is sluggish operation due to fouling, the gas setting may be increased by two clicks using the provided C-tool. The weapon features a standard pistol grip, a vertical forward grip integrated into the forend and a detachable buttstock. The mild felt recoil allows the weapon to be used effectively without the buttstock, using only the pistol and forward grips to support and aim the firearm. The adjustable bipod has a height adjustment mechanism and is secured to the weapon's forend, providing stability in a sustained-fire role. The bipod is quick-detachable and can be mounted or removed without the use of tools. The Ultimax 100 features an aperture type rear sight (with range settings for distances up to 1,200 m, graduated every 100 m) placed on a sliding scale and a forward vertical post housed in the front sight base and protected by two metal tabs. The weapon incorporates sheet metal stamping and the use of synthetic components in its design. The drum magazine, buttstock, pistol grip and forend with vertical grip are all made of an impact-resistant polymer. The Mark 3/3A can fire both the American 5.56×45mm M193 cartridge (with 1:12 (305 mm) twist barrel fitted) or the heavier SS109/M855 cartridge (178 mm (1:7 in) twist rate barrel).
- Mark 4: Developed for the United States Marine Corps Infantry Automatic Rifle program, with the addition of a new fire selector module. The Marine Corps did not select the Ultimax and chose an automatic rifle based on the HK416.
- Mark 5: Updated variant of the Mark 4 with a folding stock, Picatinny rails and M16 STANAG 4179 magazine well that will accept 30-round box magazines and the 100-round Beta C-Mag drum.
- STK also developed a vehicle-mounted variant of the weapon for use on the Bronco All Terrain Tracked Carrier and on the Spider Light Strike Vehicle.
- Mark 8: New variant unveiled at the 2012 Singapore Airshow.
- Mark 9: Features belt-fed system.

== Users ==
- Bosnia & Herzegovina
- Brunei: Adopted to replace Colt M16 HBAR LMGs.
- Chile: Chilean Marine Corps, replaced in 2014 by the Heckler & Koch MG4.
- Croatia
- Fiji
- Indonesia: Komando Pasukan Katak (Kopaska) tactical diver group and Komando Pasukan Khusus (Kopassus) special forces group.
- Papua New Guinea
- Peru
- Philippines
- Serbia: Used by the SAJ.
- Singapore: Commissioned by the Singapore Army in 1982. It will gradually be replaced by the Colt IAR6940E-SG.
- Slovenia: Used by the Specialna Enota Policije.
- Solomon Islands: Royal Solomon Islands Police Force purchased 50.
- Thailand
- United States: Known to be used by US Army Special Forces and Delta Force operators.
- Zimbabwe

=== Non-state users ===
- Karen National Liberation Army
- New People's Army
- Tamil Tigers
- Moro Islamic Liberation Front
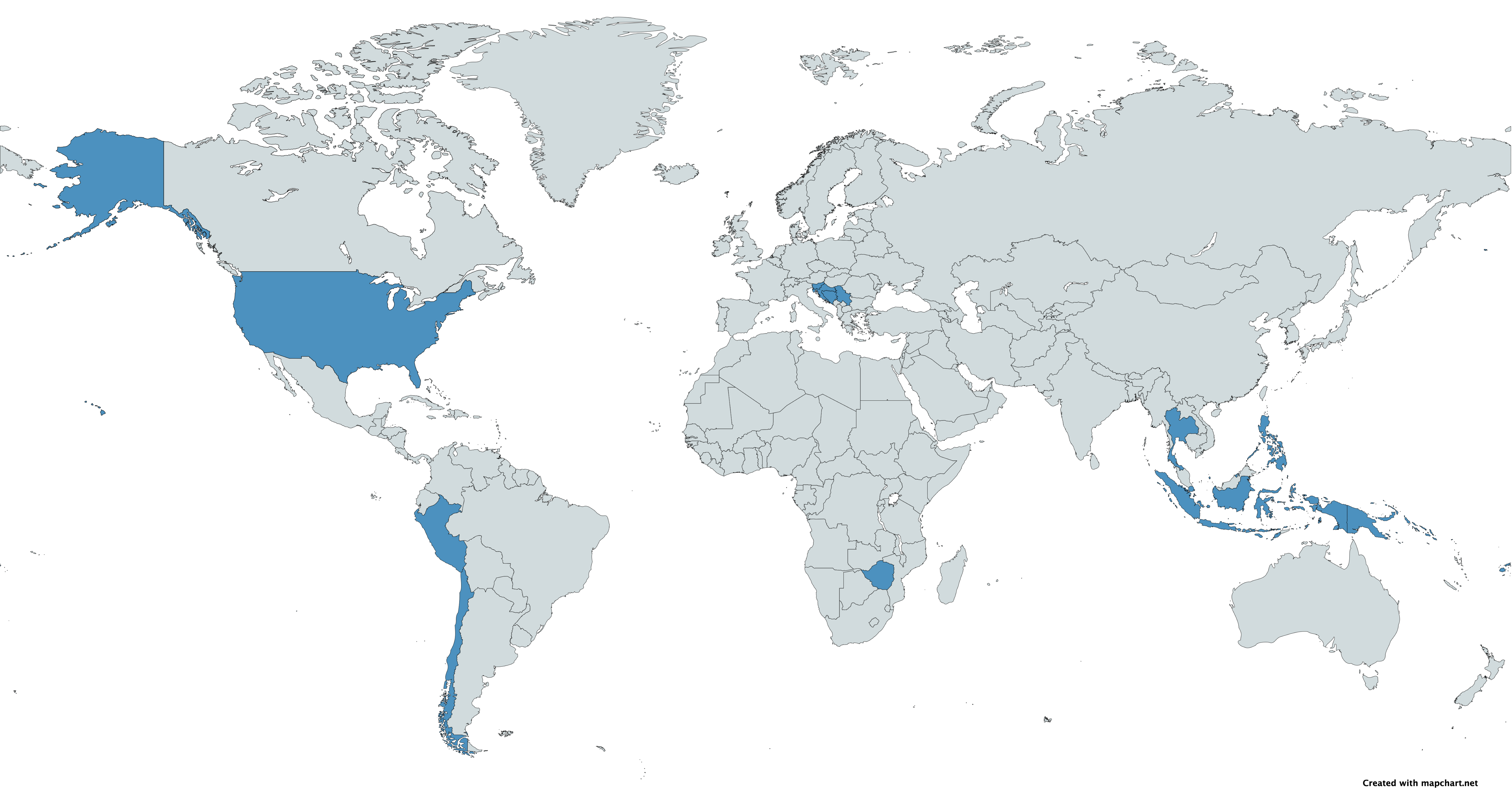
Map with users of the Ultimax 100 in blue

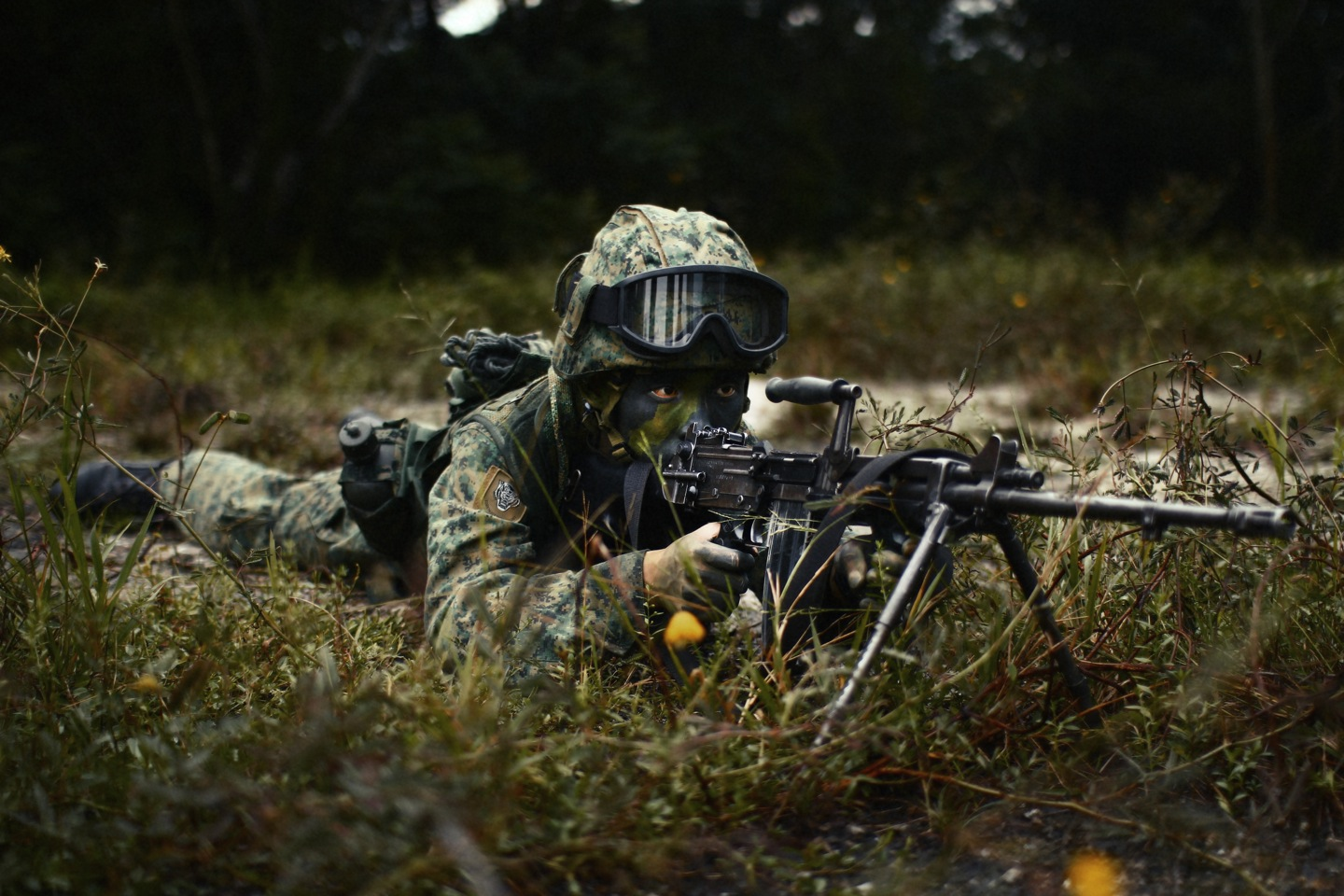
A Singaporean soldier with a deployed Ultimax 100 Mk 2 Section Automatic Weapon (SAW)

== See also ==
- ArmaLite AR-100 – (United States)
- M+G project – (Netherlands) – (Netherlands)
- Stoner 63 – (United States)
- STK 50MG – (Singapore)
