= Heidel =

Heidel is a surname. Notable people with the surname include:

- Alexander Heidel (1907–1955), American assyriologist
- Christian Heidel (born 1963), German football executive
- Edith Ogden Heidel (1870–1956), American sculptor
- Jimmy Heidel (born 1943), American football player
- Willi Heidel (1916–2008), Romanian handball player
