= G13 carbine =

- Type: Carbine
- Place of origin: Georgia

Production history
- Manufacturer: STC Delta

Specifications
- Length: 840 mm (33 in) (stock extended); 750 mm (30 in) (stock retracted)
- Barrel length: 370 mm (15 in)
- Cartridge: 5.56×45mm NATO
- Action: Gas-operated (short-stroke piston), rotating bolt
- Rate of fire: 700–950 round/min cyclic
- Effective firing range: 400–500 m (1,300–1,600 ft) (without optics)
- Feed system: 30-round box magazine or STANAG magazines.
- Sights: Iron and optical sights

The G13 carbine was a proposed Georgian military firearm which was supposed to be an analogue to the American M4 carbine and German HK416 carbine.

== History ==
The G14 has been developed in 2012 by the Georgian military Scientific-Technical Center "Delta" in order to construct an alternative to the M4 carbine, which is in service of the Georgian Armed Forces.

== Characteristics ==
According to DELTA, the G13's design is primarily based on the M4 but differs significantly in terms of firing mechanism and durability.

The interior bears a short-stroke piston gas operated system in combination with improved back components. The probability of problematic issues that would occur with standard issue M4 carbines like jamming or overheating after a certain number of rounds were fired are decisively reduced so that the overall reliability is improved.

Furthermore, the developer states that during tests the carbine showed slightly better precision than the original M4. These changes made it necessary to develop new iron sights, optics and other parts which would not apply to the M4.

The G13 was to come with modified attachment kits and optics as standard issue.
