= Beretta AR70/90 =

Italian assault rifle

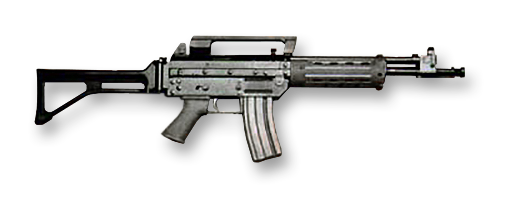
- A Beretta AR70/90 SCP
- Type: Assault rifle
- Place of origin: Italy

Service history
- In service: AR70/223: 1972–1990; AR70/90: 1990–present
- Used by: See Users
- Wars: War in Afghanistan; Iraq War; Mexican drug war Syrian Civil War

Production history
- Designer: Beretta
- Designed: AR70/223: 1972; AR70/90: 1985
- Manufacturer: Beretta
- Variants: See Variants

Specifications
- Mass: 3.99 kg (8.80 lb) (varies slightly)
- Length: 998 mm (39.3 in) (varies slightly)
- Cartridge: 5.56×45mm NATO
- Action: Gas-operated
- Rate of fire: 650 RPM (varies slightly)
- Muzzle velocity: 950 m/s (3,100 ft/s)
- Effective firing range: 500 m (1,600 ft)
- Feed system: 30-round STANAG Magazine; 100-round C-Mag drum magazine
- Sights: Iron/grenade sights

The Beretta AR70/90 is a gas operated assault rifle chambered for the 5.56×45 mm NATO cartridge, and is the standard issue service rifle of the Italian Armed Forces. The weapon is also designed to be fitted with a rifle grenade, and has grenade sights. The AR series comes in many variants such as the AR90, with a wire folding stock, for use by paratroopers.

== History ==
=== Beretta AR70 ===
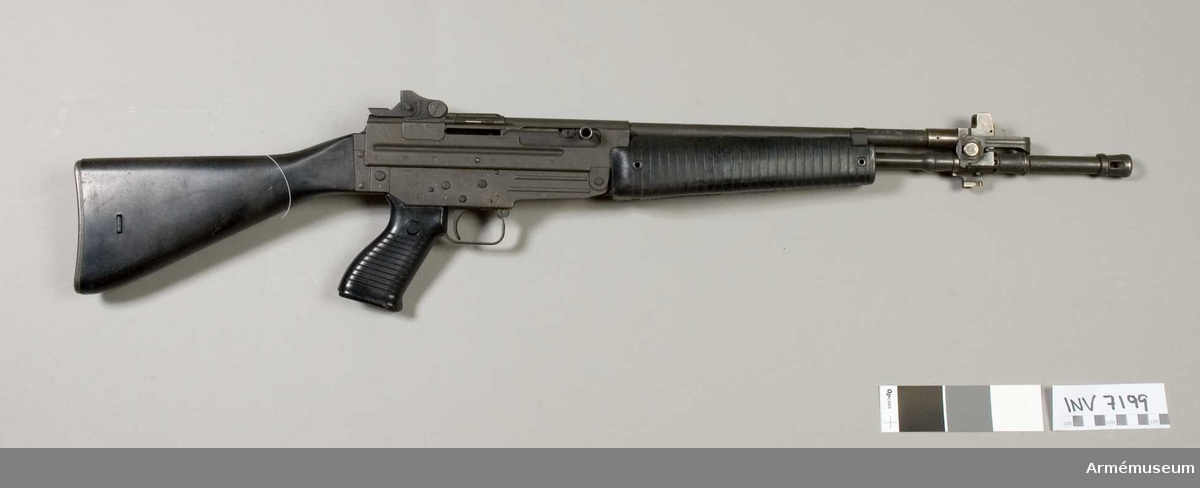
Beretta AR70/223, the AR70/90's predecessor, which was created from Beretta's experiences in developing the SIG SG 530.

In 1963, SIG and Beretta began a joint development of the SIG SG 530. In 1968, Beretta decided to cease development with SIG, with the latter developer choosing to continue work on the SG 530, which was refined into the SG 540 and, later, the SG 550. Beretta instead pursued development of its own off-shoot of the SG 530, using the information and experience they had gained from the project. The result was the Beretta AR70, which externally resembled its parent weapon, the SG 530, while differing in the internal firing mechanism/locking system.

The AR-70 was introduced in 1972. Following the successful testing of the rifle's capabilities, it was adopted by various outfits of Italian military and police. These include COMSUBIN, the San Marco Battalion of the Italian Navy, the NOCS of the State Police and was also issued by Italian Airforce to men of VAM (Vigilanza Aeronautica Militare). Exports to foreign armies include Jordan, Malaysia and others.

The rifle was initially designated AR-70, but was later redesignated as AR-70/223 to distinguish it from the later AR70/90. AR-70/223 was available in three variants. The AR-70/223 standard automatic rifle, SC-70 carbine which was 223 with the same muzzle length but with foldable stock, and a special SCS-70/223 rifle with detachable shortened muzzle and foldable stock). A light support weapon variant of 70/223 was also developed, with a removable box magazine and a quick-change barrel, but it did not achieve considerable success.

=== Italian Army adoption of the AR70/90 ===
Development of Beretta AR70/90 rifle began when in the 1980s when the Italian Government decided that its military and law enforcement agencies needed a new standard service weapon. It was made to be compatible with other NATO weapons by the adoption of standard 5.56 mm STANAG loaders, whereas the AR70/90's predecessor, the BM59, derived from the U.S. M1 Garand, was chambered in 7.62 mm (.308), another NATO caliber which today is considered suitable mostly for sniper or machine gun use.

The Beretta AR70/223 in its current state could not be submitted for the trials. In October 1980, NATO had chosen the Belgian 62 gr SS109 cartridge as the new standard for the 5.56×45mm round. Because the AR70/223 still ran on the older 5.56mm M193 cartridge, the platform required changes to accommodate the newly standardized SS109 cartridge. Furthermore, a significant defect in build of AR70/223 had been discovered. The receiver of the AR70/223 model was pressed steel box with bolt guides pressed in. It was found that the receiver would distort and jam the firing bolt, if the weapon was subjected to harsh circumstances. The result of these and other upgrades to AR70/223 platform would eventually spawn a new assault rifle design, which would become known as AR70/90.

The first working samples were ready in 1985 and the AR-70/90 was submitted to the rifle evaluation trials conducted by Stabilimento Militare di Armamento Leggero di Terni (Light Armament Military Plant of Terni) in the years 1988 and 1989.

During the trials, the AR-70/90 competed with a variant of H&K G41 licensed and produced domestically by Franchi and the Mod.378 VB-SR, a modified clone of the Galil SAR developed by Bernardelli. There was also intent to request Colt to submit the M16A2 to be evaluated, but legal troubles involving Renato Gamba and his company (currently Bremec S.r.l) – which was Colt's Italian representative – blocked the evaluation of M16A2. AR70/90 would win the trials and be adopted as Italian Army's standard assault rifle.

=== Civilian versions ===
In 1990 the AR70/90 (Automatic Rifle) model was adopted as a standard automatic rifle; in addition to the basic version with fixed stock, the SC70/90 variants (Special Carbine) with folding stock were adopted, mainly for the Alpini troops, and the SCP70/90 (Special Carbine Paratroopers) rifle for paratroopers with recoil pad foldable and shorter barrel than the SC which allows insertion into the rifle sheath used in parachute jumps.

A light support weapon variant, known as the AS70/90, was also developed. It could be fed with either ammo-belt or standard 30-round STANAG magazine. However, it was not adopted by Italian Armed Forces, whom had instead adopted the Belgian FN Minimi.

As with BM59, the AR70/90 also supplanted the older AR70/223 models in all departments that had adopted it.

Both the 70/223 automatic rifles and the 70/90 automatic rifles are also available in semi-automatic only versions for the law enforcement and civilian market. Known as the AR-70/90s, it was mostly identical to military variant, with exception of deleted flash hider, bayonet mount and carrying handle.

Since January 2018, the latest civilian versions have been marketed by Nuova Jager S.r.l. These are mainly rifles acquired from the reserves of the Carabinieri, which have been modified by the distributor for semi-automatic operation only. These variants still maintain the original .223 Remington caliber, ability to take NATO/STANAG magazines, while barrel length has been reduced to 21mm.

=== Replacement ===
In 2008, Italian Armed Forces initiated the layered Soldato Futuro (Future Soldier) program, which sought to modernize the elements of the Armed Forces following the wake of innovations and battlefield experiences in 2000s. One of the program's perimeters was examining a potential replacement/upgrade for the Beretta AR70/90.

Beretta began to develop an upgraded version of the Beretta AR70/90 platform, but the product in development would eventually evolve into the Beretta ARX-160, which would be chosen as AR70/90's successor as standard automatic rifle of Italian Armed Forces.

Between 2008 and 2014, there were around 30,000 ARX160 A2s that are chambered in 5.56×45mm NATO cartridge that have been supplied to the Italian Army, Italian Navy, Italian Air Force and Italian Special Forces, supplementing the AR70/90. ARX-160 has been since the deployed in several operations conducted by Italian Armed Forces, including missions in Afghanistan.

== Description ==
The AR70/90 is manufactured according to 1980s standards, i.e. with limited use of polymer plastic parts and using stainless steel whenever possible (a Beretta staple). It weighs approximately 4 kg (8.82 lb) in standard configuration. It has three firing positions (full auto, three-round burst, and semi-auto) and a safe, and has a carrying handle not unlike the Vietnam-era M16, a long, bulky barrel, and a hollow stock. It is usually fitted with an ACOG or a red dot optic.

== Users ==
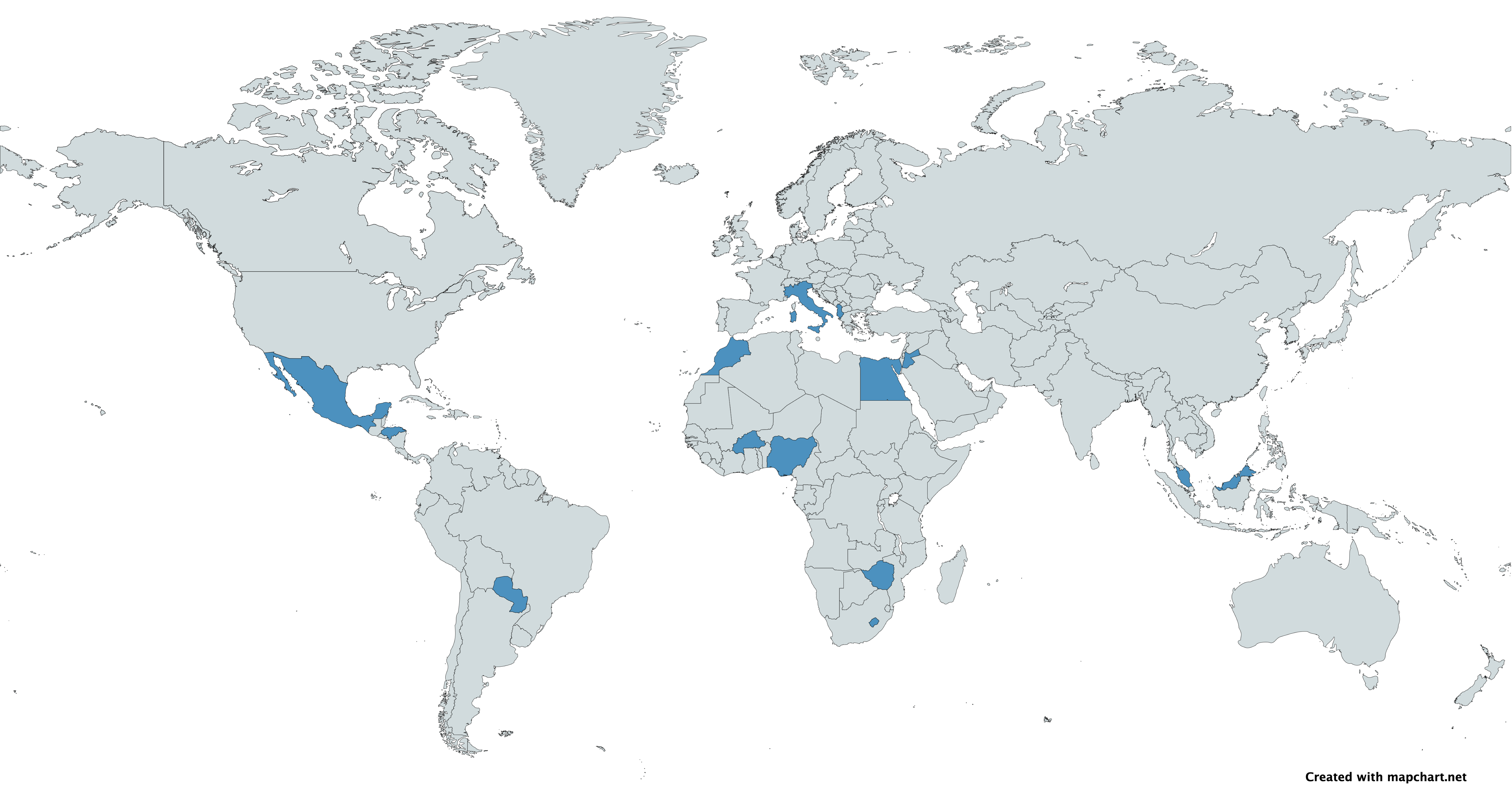
Map with Beretta AR70/90 users in blue

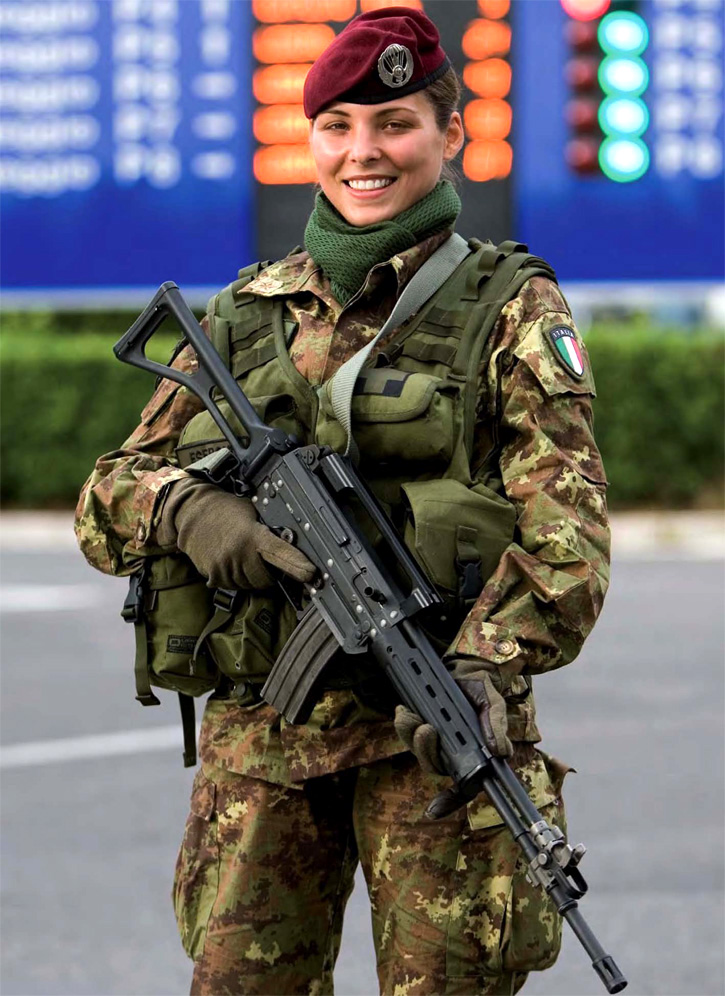
Italian soldier of the Folgore Brigade armed with an SC70/90 rifle.

- Albania: 5,000 units gifted to the Albanian Armed Forces by Italy.
- Burkina Faso: Police
- Egypt: Used by police forces
- Honduras: Delivered 1,000 in 2006. Used by the Honduran Police.
- Italy: Army has 105,000 AR70/90 and SC70/90, as well as 15,000 SCP70s in service; the weapons are also in service with the Navy, Air Force, Carabinieri, Guardia di Finanza and Polizia di Stato. Those models will be decommissioned in favor of the ARX-160.
- Jordan – SC70/223 is the standard carbine of the Special Forces from the 1980s
- Lesotho
- Malaysia
- Mexico
- Morocco
- Nigeria
- Paraguay
- Ukraine
- Zimbabwe

== See also ==
- FARA 83
- FN FNC
- SIG 530
- List of assault rifles
