= SIG SG 530 =

- Type: Assault rifle
- Place of origin: Switzerland

Production history
- Designer: Schweizerische Industrie Gesellschaft (SIG)
- Designed: 1963–1972
- Manufacturer: Swiss Industrial Group (SIG); Beretta (until 1968)

Specifications
- Mass: 3.45 kg (7.61 lb)
- Length: 940 mm (37.0 in)
- Cartridge: 5.56x45mm NATO.223 Remington
- Action: Gas-operated, roller-delayed blowback
- Rate of fire: 600 rounds/min
- Muzzle velocity: 912 m/s (2,992 ft/s)
- Maximum firing range: 500 m (547 yd)
- Feed system: 30-round detachable box magazine
- Sights: Iron sights

The SIG SG 530 was a prototype Swiss assault rifle developed in the 1960s by Schweizerische Industrie Gesellschaft (SIG) and Fabbrica d'Armi Pietro Beretta to take the then-new M193 ball and M196 tracer 5.56x45mm NATO military rounds. The 530 was only ever manufactured in small numbers, but was the basis for later, more successful projects, like the SG 540 and SG 550 rifles, as well as the Beretta AR-70.

== Development ==
Development of the rifle started in 1963 as a joint project between SIG and Beretta to create a modern, light, and affordable rifle chambered in 5.56×45mm NATO. Beretta had already cooperated with SIG on the production of the SG 510-4 rifle for Chile. The SIG SG 530 was constructed primarily out of stamped sheet steel and hardwood furniture. The roller delayed-blowback operating system of the SIG SG 510 was retained for controlled unlocking, but adapting this mechanism for the 5.56 mm cartridge proved difficult: the rifle had extraction difficulties due to the round's higher velocity and there was a higher potential for ammunition cook-off in overheated chambers. To solve these problems, it was decided that the roller-lock mechanism would be paired with a long-stroke gas piston.

The SG 530 is arguably unique as a rifle that is both gas operated and roller-locked. After firing, the 530 is designed to tap propellant gases from a port in the barrel and directed into the gas cylinder, where they impinge on the piston head attached to the bolt carrier. This force drives the carrier rearward, with a cam on the carrier rotating the bolt head to unlock and cam the rollers inward, extracting the cartridge. This hybrid configuration also improved controllability by leveraging gas pressure to manage bolt movement more effectively than the original delayed-blowback setup.

In addition to the SG 510, significant inspiration for the 530's design was taken from the German Heckler & Koch G3 rifle and the Spanish CETME Model 58, in particular with the charging handle being located on a gas cylinder mounted over the barrel. This gas cylinder doubles as the housing for the long-stroke gas piston and the recoil spring, and also isolated the chamber from residual heat to prevent premature ignition of loaded rounds. In 1968, Beretta ceased development with SIG, and went to work on their own 5.56 mm rifle design, while SIG continued development on the 530 singlehandedly. Beretta released the outwardly similar AR70 in 1972, with some notable differences between the two being that the AR-70 moved the charging handle to the right side of the bolt carrier and changed the bolt to a rotating type, similar to that on an AK.

Development progressed through late-1960s testing phases, including evaluations by the Swiss military that provided feedback on ergonomics and portability, with a key goal of reducing weight below 3.5 kilograms (7.7 lb) to meet infantry requirements for maneuverability. However, the SG 530's complex hybrid design proved overly complex and expensive to produce, failing to align with the Swiss Army's requirements for affordability and operational simplicity. According to the Helvetic Arms virtual small arms museum, only about twenty prototype SIG SG 530 rifles were ever built before the project was abandoned in the mid-1970s. Having seen the success of the Beretta AR-70 design, SIG lifted a number of design elements from the AR-70, including the charging handle and gas system, and this led to the creation of the SG 540 series. The 540 contained even more design inspiration from the G3, namely the rear sight. The 540 design was far more popular and would ultimately evolve into the SIG SG 550. The magazine for the 530 was retained in the 540 and AR-70 designs.

== Bibliography ==
- Hogg, Ian V. and Weeks, John S. Military Small Arms of the 20th Century. Iola, WI, 7th edition, 2000. Pages 280–281. ISBN 0-87341-824-7.

== See also ==
- SIG SG 540
- SIG SG 550
- SIG Sauer SIG516
- Beretta AR70/90
- FARA 83
- FN CAL
- List of assault rifles
