= Beretta AS70/90 =

- Type: Light machine gun Squad Automatic Weapon
- Place of origin: Italy

Specifications
- Mass: 5.4 kg (11.8lbs) unloaded
- Length: 1000 mm (39.4inches)
- Barrel length: 460 mm (18.3inches)
- Caliber: 5.56×45mm NATO
- Action: Gas-operated, rotating bolt, selective fire
- Rate of fire: 800 rounds/min
- Feed system: Various STANAG Magazines.
- Sights: Adjustable front post, 2 position rear flip aperture

The Beretta AS70/90 was a light machine gun or squad automatic weapon derived from the Beretta AR70/90 rifle system. It used the same gas operated, rotating bolt system as the rifle but fired from an open bolt and had a much heavier fixed barrel.

There were some minor cosmetic changes from the rifle, including an enhanced front hand grip and enlarged handguard around the barrel. The stock was modified slightly to support the shooter's shoulder and provides a grip for the support hand.

The carrying handle was removable and its mounting can be used for a variety of optics.

The AS70/90 light machine gun had been introduced by Beretta as a response to the requests of the Italian Army, which by the time (the late 1980s) was looking for a more compact and handy squad automatic weapon to replace in this role the MG-42/59 (Italian license-made version of the German Rheinmetall MG3 machine-gun). The AS70/90 anyway never passed well the extremely stringent trial tests it underwent by the Alpini troops of the Italian Army. The open bolt working system made this gun more sensitive to the penetration of dirt and other elements which caused frequent jamming and malfunctions. Furthermore, the AS70/90 fed only by STANAG magazines; and although this includes the possibility of using the high-capacity (100-rounds) Beta C-Mag, this was still too little for the necessity of the Italian Armed Forces, who wanted a belt-fed weapon with magazine-feeding possibility as an emergency optional. As a result, the AS70/90 was discarded, the FN MINIMI light machine-gun being adopted instead (and being since manufactured under license in Italy by Beretta). The AS70/90 never interested any other customer, and quickly went out of the Beretta Defence/Police catalogues. The very few samples manufactured are today in the hands of Beretta itself and of the Italian Armed Forces, which make no use of it.

== See also ==
- RPK – (Soviet Union)

== Sources ==
- Charles Cutshaw, Tactical small arms of the 21st century
