= FARA 83 =

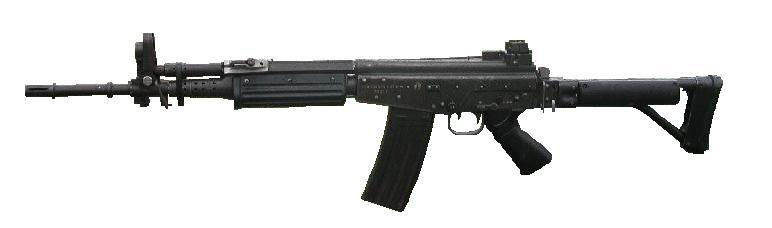
- Type: Assault rifle
- Place of origin: Argentina

Service history
- In service: 1984–present
- Used by: Argentine Army

Production history
- Designer: Enrique Chichizola
- Designed: 1981
- Manufacturer: FMAP-DM
- Produced: 1984-1990
- No. built: 1193

Specifications
- Mass: 3.95 kg (8.71 lb)
- Length: 1,000 mm (39.4 in)
- Barrel length: 452 mm (17.8 in)
- Cartridge: 5.56×45mm NATO
- Caliber: 5.56mm
- Action: Gas-operated reloading
- Rate of fire: 700-800 rounds/min
- Muzzle velocity: 980 m/s (3,215 ft/s)
- Effective firing range: 500 metres (550 yd)
- Feed system: 30 round detachable box magazine
- Sights: Iron sights

The FARA 83 (Spanish: Fusil Automático República Argentina; "Argentine Republic Automatic Rifle") or FAA 81, "Argentine Automatic Rifle" (Spanish: Fusil Automático Argentino) was a rifle locally designed and developed for the Argentine Army in the 1980s. It is one of the first indigenously designed assault rifles in South America.

== Development ==
The FAA project started in the early 1980s, when the government was still controlled by the National Reorganization Process. The DGFM (General Government Directorate for Military Manufacturing, or Dirección General de Fabricaciones Militares) ordered a replacement be designed for the FMAP FAL, a FN FAL license-built in Argentina. The prototype was completed in 1981, but production didn't start until 1984, and continued until 1990.

By the late 1980s, under Carlos Menem's tenure as president, the country was undergoing economic difficulties. The economic crisis severely limited the production of modern weapons. This factor forced President Menem to cancel several projects, including the Condor I and Condor II, the FARA 83, and SAIA 90. He was also forced to close armament factories, including TAMSE (Tanque Argentino Mediano Sociedad del Estado), which was responsible for the TAM tanks and Domecq Garcia Shipyard (the only submarine-related shipyard). Production of the rifle ground to a halt after 1193 rifles had been completed, however, it was resumed in 1990; it is unknown how many rifles were made, but for the most part the Argentine Armed Forces are still armed with the FAL rifle, while the FARA 83 is a secondary weapon.

== Main characteristics ==
The FARA-83 was mostly inspired by the Beretta AR70 (Model of 1982). Features include a folding buttstock and tritium sights for aiming in low light conditions; the rifle uses a proprietary 30-round Beretta AR70 magazine (early issue), and has a trigger group that enables semi-automatic and fully automatic fire.

== In popular culture ==
The FARA 83 is featured in the first-person shooter video game Call of Duty: Black Ops Cold War as part of the Season 2 battle pass which is claimed at tier 15.
