= SIG SG 540 =

SG 540
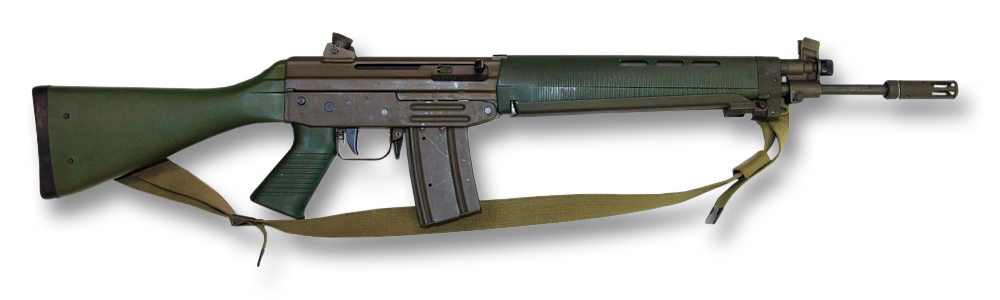
- The SIG SG 540 with fixed stock
- Type: Assault rifle (SG-540, SG-543); Carbine (SG-543); Battle Rifle (SG-542)
- Place of origin: Switzerland

Service history
- In service: 1977–present
- Used by: See Users
- Wars: Lebanese Civil War; The Troubles; Somali Civil War; Ivorian Civil Wars; Syrian Civil War; Militias-Comando Vermelho conflict

Production history
- Designer: Schweizerische Industrie Gesellschaft (SIG)
- Designed: 1973–1977
- Manufacturer: Manurhin (France); INDEP (Portugal); FAMAE (Chile)
- Produced: 1977–2002
- Variants: SG 542, SG 543

Specifications
- Mass: SG 540: 3.52 kg (7.76 lb) fixed stock SG 542: 3.55 kg (7.8 lb); SG 543: 3 kg (6.6 lb) folding stock
- Length: SG 540: 950 mm (37.4 in) stock extended / 733 mm (28.9 in) stock folded SG 542: 1,000 mm (39.4 in) stock extended / 754 mm (29.7 in) stock folded SG 543: 805 mm (31.7 in) stock extended / 569 mm (22.4 in) stock folded
- Barrel length: SG 540: 460 mm (18.1 in); SG 542: 465 mm (18.3 in); SG 543: 300 mm (11.8 in)
- Cartridge: SG 540, SG 543: 5.56×45mm NATO; SG 542: 7.62×51mm NATO
- Action: Gas-operated, rotating bolt
- Rate of fire: 650–800 rounds/min
- Muzzle velocity: SG 540: 980 m/s (3,215 ft/s); SG 542: 820 m/s (2,690.3 ft/s); SG 543: 875 m/s (2,870.7 ft/s)
- Effective firing range: 100–500 m sight adjustments
- Feed system: 20- or 30-round detachable box magazine
- Sights: Rear: rotating diopter drum; front: hooded post

The SG 540 is a 5.56×45mm NATO assault rifle developed in the early 1970s by Schweizerische Industrie Gesellschaft (SIG, currently SAN Swiss Arms AG) of Neuhausen, Switzerland as a private venture primarily destined for export markets and as a potential replacement for the 7.5×55mm Swiss SG 510 automatic rifle known as the Stgw 57 in Swiss service.

== History ==
Work on a new generation of lightweight rifle using the intermediate 5.56mm round began at SIG in the 1960s and resulted in the somewhat unsuccessful SG 530-1 design that employed a gas-assisted roller-delayed blowback operating mechanism which proved too complicated and expensive to manufacture. As a result, in 1969 SIG chose to dispense with the complex roller-delayed action opting instead for a design using the more robust and simple piston-operated rotating bolt locking mechanism (derived from the Soviet 7.62×39mm AK-47 assault rifle). This combination proved successful and the rifle entered production as a family of weapons consisting of the base 5.56mm SG 540, the 7.62mm SG 542 battle rifle and the 5.56mm SG 543 carbine, where both 5.56mm variants were designed for use with 5.56×45mm M193 ammunition, while the SG 542—the full size 7.62×51mm NATO rifle cartridge.

Production began between 1973 and 1974, but due to Swiss federal restrictions on firearms exportation, manufacturing had to be carried out at the Manurhin (Manufacture de Machines du Haut Rhin) facility in Mulhouse, France.

The SG 540 series has entered service with the armed forces of several countries in Africa, Asia and South America as well as numerous law enforcement and security services. In 1988, the nationally owned Portuguese defense manufacturer INDEP purchased rights to license build the SG 543 carbine for its own forces. Currently the SG 540, SG 542, and the SG 543 are manufactured in Chile, under license by FAMAE for the Chilean Armed Forces. Based on the SG 540, FAMAE developed a 9×19mm Parabellum submachine gun version of the weapon known as the SAF.

== Design details ==
=== Operating mechanism ===
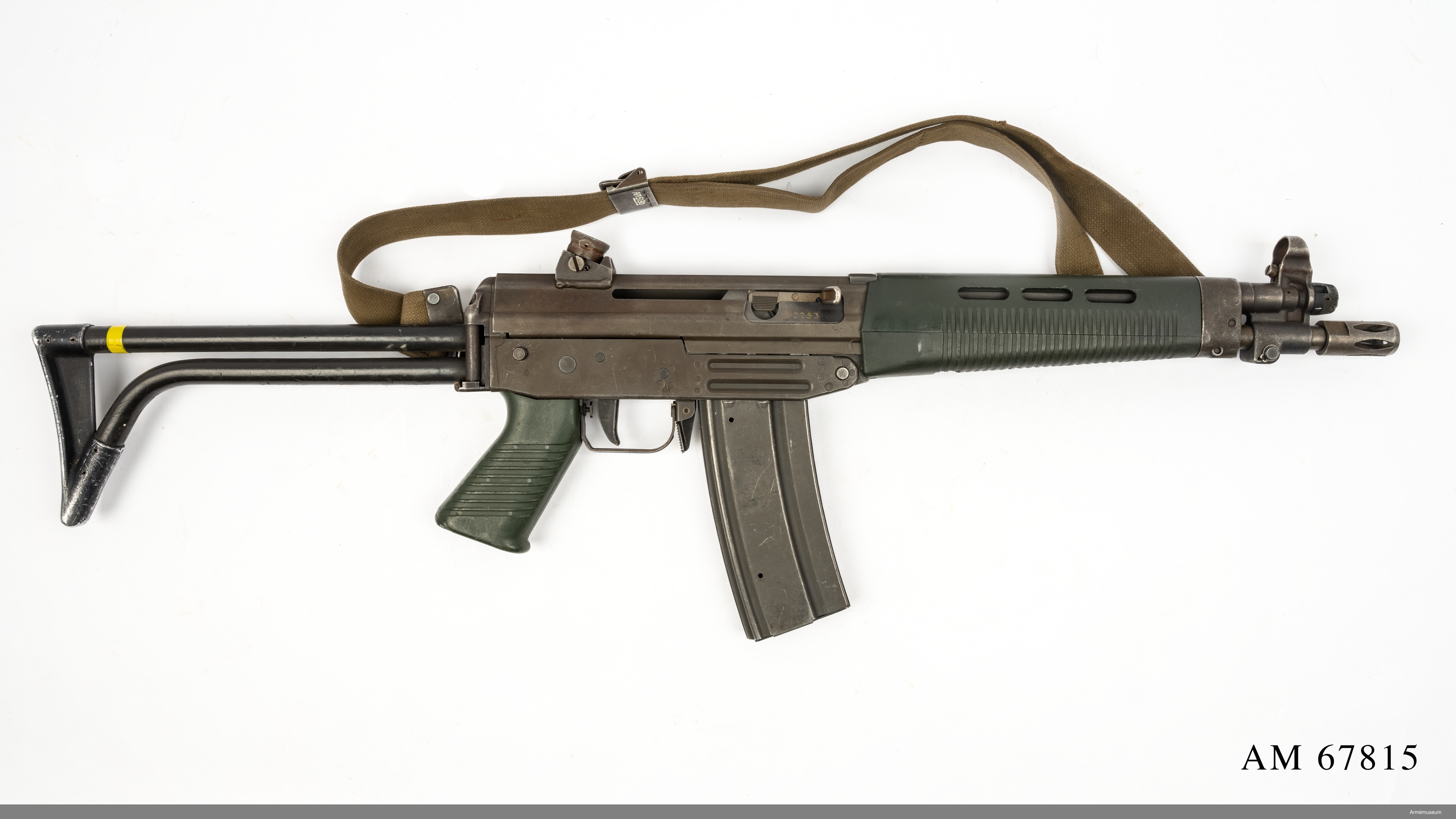
SG 543 carbine with stock extended.

The SG 540 is an air-cooled, gas-operated, selective fire assault rifle that fires from a closed bolt position. SIG designers used a long-stroke piston-driven action (with the recoil spring wrapped around the piston rod itself) and an adjustable gas regulator with three settings: "0" (used to launch rifle grenades), "1" (used in normal operating conditions), and "2" (used in extreme environmental conditions or in the presence of heavy fouling). The firearm is locked into battery by means of a rotating bolt which features two heavy steel locking lugs.

The bolt head is rotated by a control cam riding in a helical guide slot machined into the bolt carrier. When a shot is fired, propellant gases from the barrel are fed into the gas cylinder located above the barrel and impart rearward pressure on the piston rod, which drives the bolt carrier back. After a certain amount of free travel built into the system to allow the projectile to depart the barrel, residual gas pressures in the bore drop to a safe level, allowing the breech to be opened. The cam slot in the bolt carrier proceeds to actuate the camming stud in the bolt, rotating the bolt head out of engagement with the locking abutments in the receiver. The spent cartridge casing is extracted by a claw extractor contained in the bolt assembly while a protrusion on one of the internal bolt carrier guide rails in the upper receiver acts as the fixed ejector, removing the casing through a port on the right side of the receiver housing.

=== Features ===
The rifle is hammer-fired and has a fire control selector mechanism that is also the safety (lever in the "S" position—indicates the gun is safe, "1"—semi-automatic fire, "3"—3-round burst and "20"—fully automatic fire). The SG 540 is fed from either 20 or 30-round staggered box magazines. After the last round is fired, a hold-open tab in the magazine engages the bolt catch that locks the bolt in its rear (open) position. A bolt release button is located on the left side of the receiver.

The rifled barrel is fitted with a flash suppressor, which is also used to attach 22 mm spigot-type rifle grenades and a bayonet. The iron sights consist of a hooded foresight that can be corrected in elevation and an adjustable (windage only), a rear rotating diopter drum that contains four apertures with settings for firing at: 100, 200, 300 and 500 m. The receiver top surface can be used to mount adapters enabling the use of optics.

The SG 540 series come equipped with either a fixed buttstock or a side-folding metal skeleton stock. Another standard feature is a folding lightweight aluminium bipod that folds into grooves in the lower handguard when not in use. The fixed stock, pistol grip and handguard are all made of high-strength polymers to reduce overall weight. In order to minimize costs, the weapon made extensive use of cost-saving pressed and stamped steel components rather than machined parts.

== Variants ==
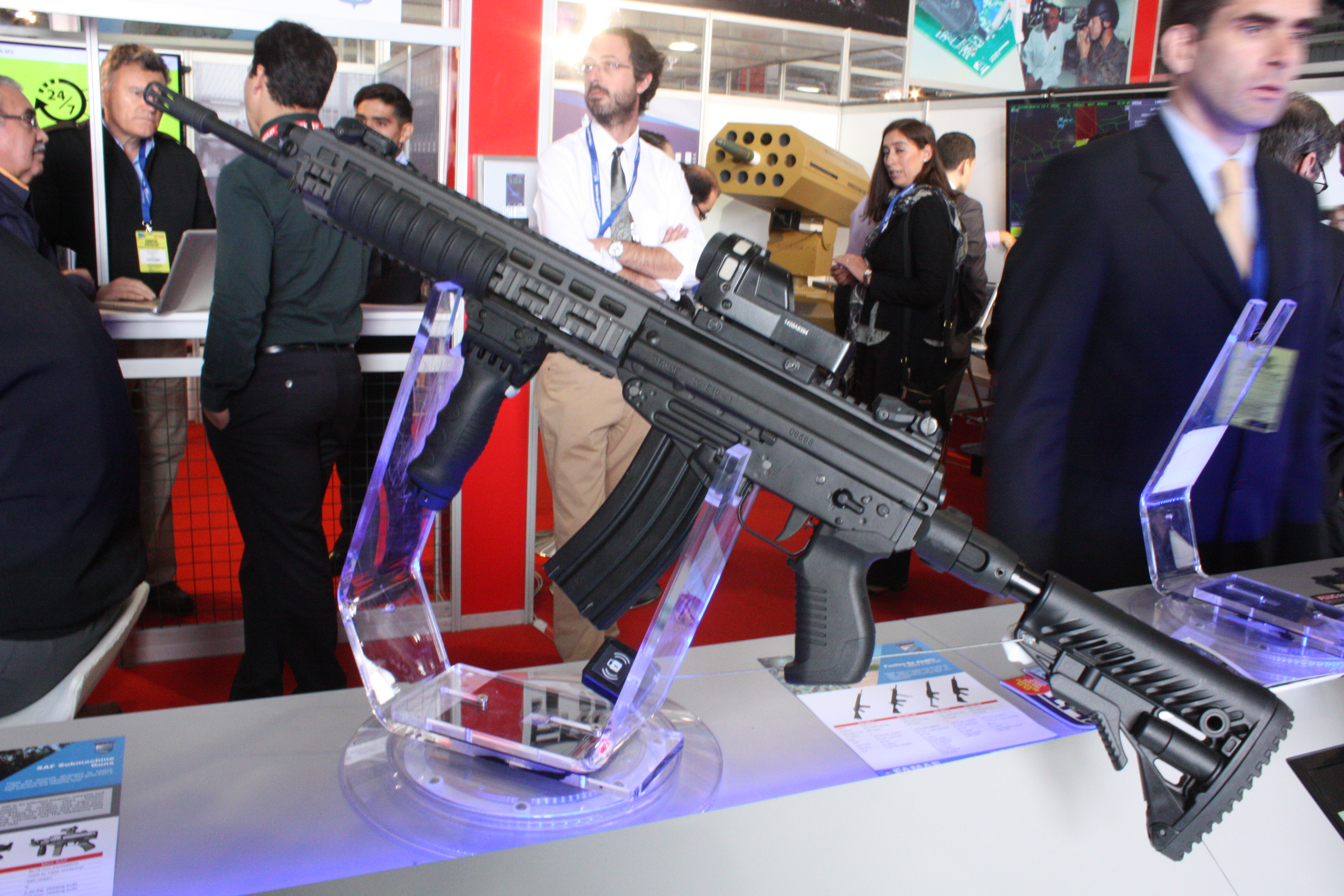
SG 540-1M upgraded by FAMAE in Chile.

Differences between the SG 542 and the SG 540 are mainly the result of adopting the more powerful 7.62×51mm cartridge. The SG 542 also uses normally 20/30-round box magazines (5 and 10 magazines were also manufactured) but the sights were modified with a 600 m setting in addition to the 100, 200, 300 and 500 m sight drum positions.

The SG 543 carbine is a shortened variant of the SG 540 that has been modified with a short 300 mm (11.8 in) barrel, a shorter gas cylinder and piston rod as well as a different handguard and sights with four apertures with settings for firing at 100, 200, 300 and 400 m firing range. The SG 543 lacks the integral bipod of the SG 540/542 and the reduced barrel cannot be used to fire rifle grenades. The SG 540 served as the basis for the SG 541 prototype, which would later become the SG 550 that entered service with the Swiss Armed Forces as the Stgw 90 (Sturmgewehr 90).

Additionally, two semi-automatic variants were manufactured by MANURHIN between the late 1970s and the early 1980s specifically for the European civilian market: called the SIG Manurhin F.S.A. and the SIG Manurhin C.S.A.. These rifles were chambered in .222 Remington and .243 Winchester respectively. Both were available with either 30-round or reduced 5-round magazines, and the option of a folding or fixed stock. The unusual chambering for this type of military-style rifle was an attempt to comply with regulations in certain European countries imposing restrictions on the civilian ownership of "military" cartridges such as the 5.56×45mm NATO/.223 Remington or 7.62×51mm NATO/.308 Winchester.

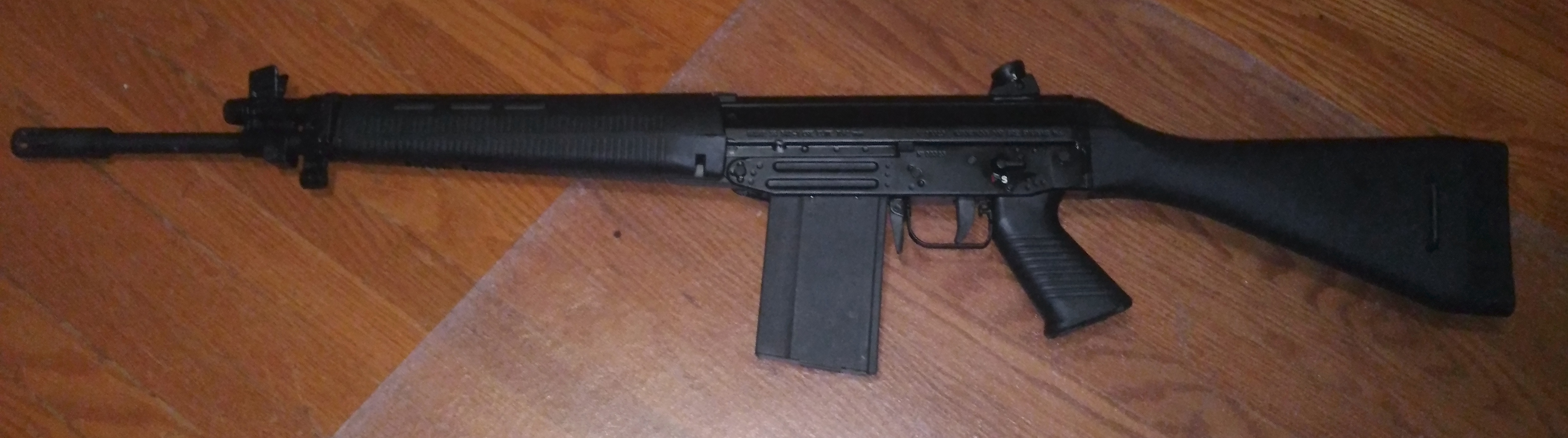
SG 542 Made by FAMAE for the Canadian civilian market

== Users ==
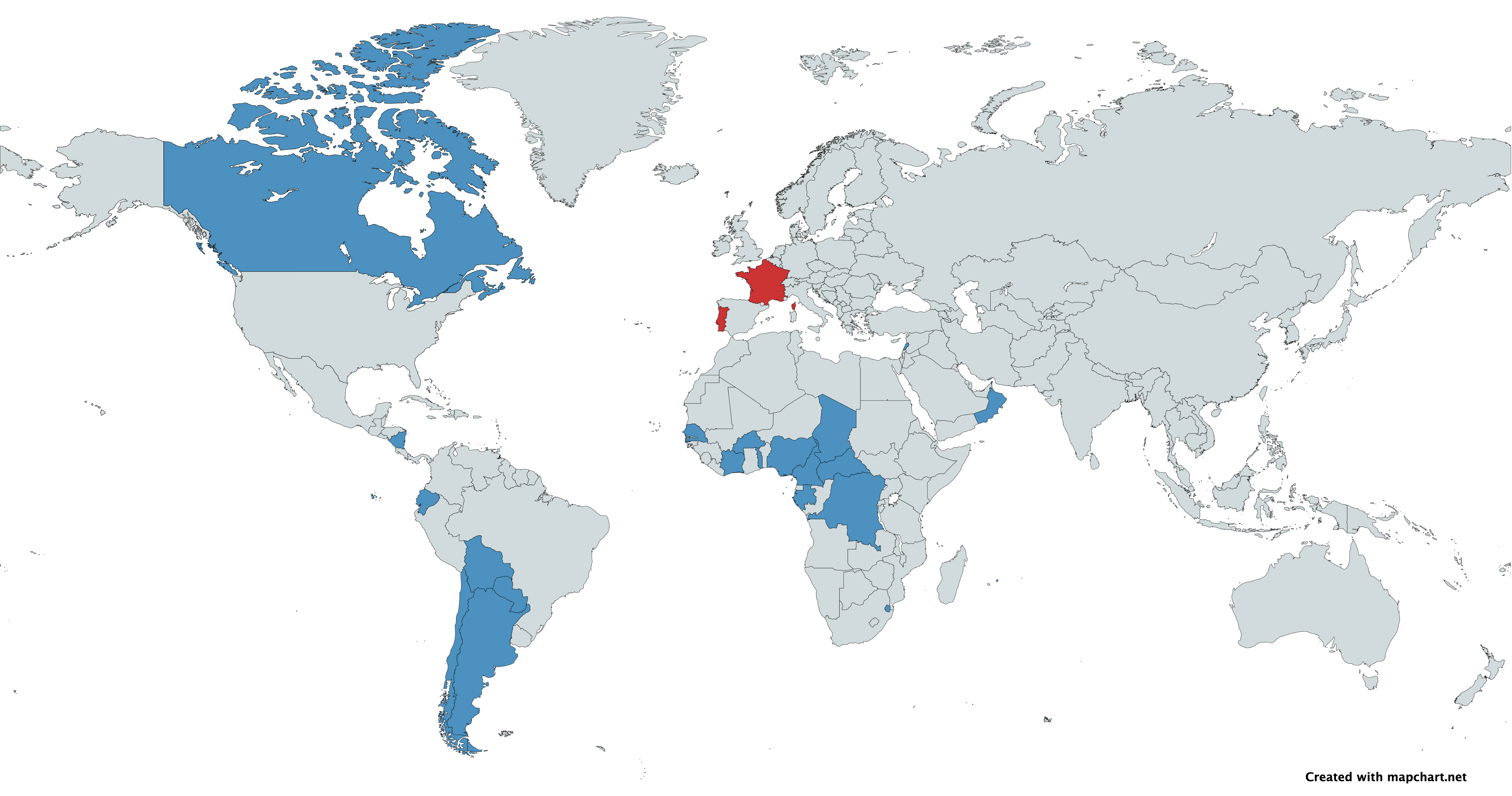
Map with SIG SG 540 users in blue and former users in red

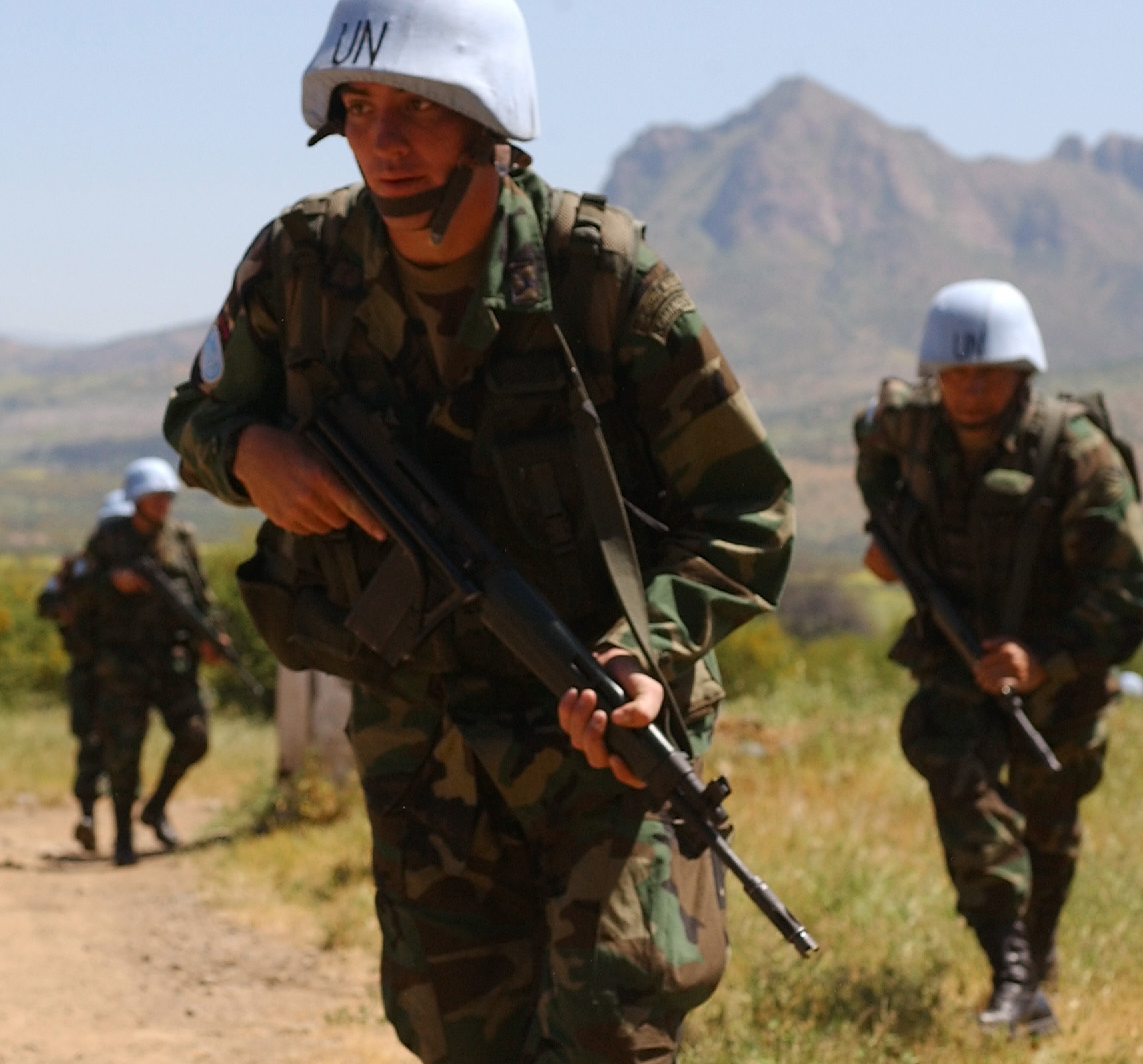
Ecuadorian Army soldiers equipped with the SG 542, circa 2002.

- Argentina: FAMAE SG540-1 and FAMAE SG543-1 issued to federal penitentiary service
- Bolivia: SG542 issued to the army. SG540-1 issued to special forces.
- Burkina Faso
- Cameroon
- Canada - Lethbridge Police Service
- Central African Republic
- Chad - Uses the SG 542 variant.
- Chile - Uses the SIG-FAMAE SG 542–1, SG 540 and SG 543 variants. In process of upgrade to M variant. Produced under license by FAMAE. Currently in the process of being replaced with the IWI Galil ACE locally produced.
- Côte d'Ivoire - SG 540 and SG 543s
- Democratic Republic of the Congo
- Djibouti
- Ecuador
- Eswatini
- Gabon
- Lebanon
- Mauritius
- Nicaragua
- Nigeria
- Oman
- Paraguay
- Senegal
- Seychelles
- Syrian Opposition
- Togo
- Turkey

=== Former users ===
- France - Produced under license by Manurhin and as a temporary resort in limited service used during the late 1970s by the French Armed Forces, RAID (French police unit) and National Police Intervention Groups. Replaced by the FAMAS in the early 1980s.
- Portugal - SG543-1 was used by Portuguese army Commandos and Special Operations Troops Centre since 1980s until 2019, when it was replaced by FN SCAR.

== See also ==
- SIG SG 510
- SIG SG 530
- SIG SG 550
- SIG Sauer SIG516
- Gun politics in Switzerland
- List of assault rifles
- List of carbines

== Bibliography ==
- Chloupek, Ireneusz (October 2002), "Karabiny szturmowe SIG cz. 1", Nowa Technika Wojskowa, Warsaw, pp. 19–23
- Long, Duncan. (1989). Assault Pistols, Rifles And Submachine Guns, Boulder: Paladin Press
- sigarms.com
