= SIG SG 550 =

Swiss assault rifle

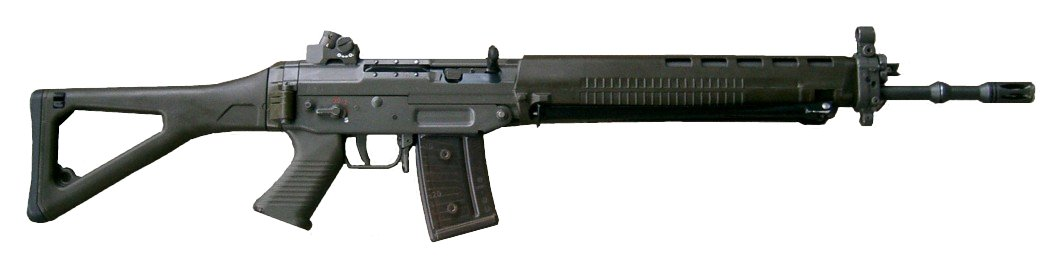
- SIG SG 550 adopted as the standard service rifle of the Swiss Army, designated as the Stgw 90
- Type: Assault rifle; Carbine; Battle rifle; Designated marksman rifle; Semi-automatic rifle
- Place of origin: Switzerland

Service history
- In service: 1990–present
- Used by: See Users
- Wars: War in Afghanistan (2001–2021); Sinai insurgency 2013 Lahad Datu standoff Yemeni Civil War (2014–present)

Production history
- Designer: Schweizerische Industrie Gesellschaft
- Designed: 1970s–1980s
- Manufacturer: SIG Sauer AG (formerly Schweizerische Industrie Gesellschaft and Swiss Arms)
- Produced: 1986–present
- No. built: 600,000
- Variants: See Variants

Specifications
- Mass: 4.1 kg (9.04 lb)
- Length: 1,000 mm (39.4 in) (stock extended); 772 mm (30.4 in) (stock folded)
- Barrel length: 528 mm (20.8 in)
- Cartridge: 5.56×45mm NATO (Note: Known as 5.6 mm Gw Pat 90 in Switzerland.); 7.62×39mm (SG 553R, SG 556R & SIG563R); .300 AAC Blackout (SG 553 BK and SIG563 BK); 6.5mm Creedmoor (SG 750); 7.62×51mm NATO (SG 750 and SG 751)
- Action: Gas operated, rotating bolt
- Rate of fire: c. 700 rounds/min
- Muzzle velocity: 911 m/s (2,989 ft/s)
- Effective firing range: 100–400 m sight adjustments
- Feed system: Proprietary 10-, 20-, 30-round box magazines (SG 550 series & SG 560 series); STANAG magazines (SIG 556 series, SG 560 series, SG 550 series (with STANAG mag well)); AKM-pattern magazines (SG 553R, SG 556R); SG 750 series magazines (SG 750 and SG 751)
- Sights: Rear: rotating diopter drum with tritium night inserts; front: hooded post with folding night post 540 mm (21.3 in) sight radius (SG 550)

The SIG SG 550 is an assault rifle manufactured by SIG Sauer AG (formerly a division of Schweizerische Industrie Gesellschaft, now known as SIG Holding AG) in Switzerland. "SG" is an abbreviation for Sturmgewehr ("assault rifle"). The SG 550 was co-developed by SIG Sauer AG and the Italian firearm manufacturer Beretta; it is based on its predecessor, the SIG SG 540, chambered in 5.56×45mm NATO.

== History ==
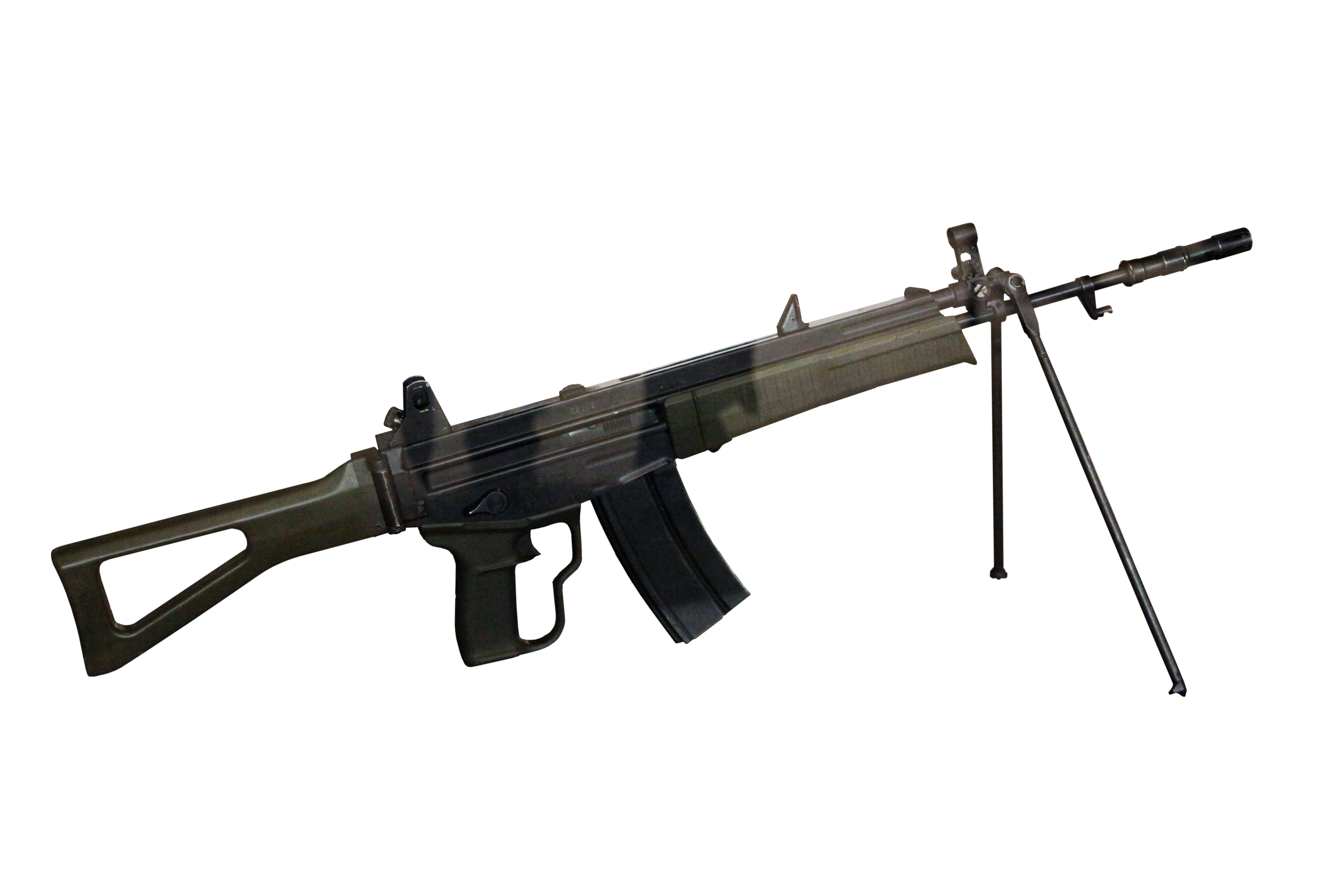
The C42 by Waffenfabrik Bern, 6.45mm Rifle version

=== Development ===
In 1978, the Swiss armed forces formulated requirements for a successor to the Stgw 57 battle rifle (known commercially as the SG 510) using the 7.5×55mm GP 11 cartridge. Emphasis was placed on modularity; the weapon family was to include several variants of the base design, including a compact carbine that would be issued to rear-echelon and support troops, command staff, vehicle crews, special forces personnel and paratroopers. Another aim was to reduce the overall weight of the rifle while retaining comparable or improved accuracy out to 300 m. The solicitation was narrowed down to two designs: the W+F C42 (developed by the state-owned Waffenfabrik Bern, using both 6.45×48mm and 5.56×45mm cartridges) and the SG 541 (developed by SIG using the SG 540 as the basis for the SG 541 prototype). In 1981, the experimental 6.45mm GP 80 cartridge was rejected in favour of the more conventional SIG 5.6×45mm Gw Pat 90 round (with a 4.1 g, tombac-jacketed, lead core projectile) that is the Swiss equivalent to NATO's standard 5.56×45mm cartridge.

=== Production ===
In February 1983, the decision to adopt the SG 541 was publicly announced (the designation of the rifle was changed in October of the following year to SG 550, while the carbine version became known as the SG 551). Production began in 1986 and four years later the rifle was officially accepted into service in 1990, hence the military designation Stgw 90. Over 600,000 rifles have been delivered since then and production for the military has now ceased.

=== Regulation in Canada ===
On 27 February 2014, the Canadian semi-automatic "Classic Green" sporting rifle, also known as the "Swiss Arms PE 90", was re-classified as a "prohibited weapon". The rifle had been popular with hunters and gun enthusiasts, who until February 2014, only required a possession and acquisition licence to obtain the rifle.

In 2013, a gun dealer had imported some PE 90 rifles from Switzerland and brought them to Canada for sale. After some were sold, it was alleged that the rifles in question were of a variant not allowed in Canada (PE90). Upon investigation and examination by the RCMP, this was proven inconclusive, however, the RCMP went further and decided the versions in Canada were too close to the PE90 and reclassified the rifles and declared the entire model line prohibited, with possible confiscation for destruction. This caused outrage amongst owners and lobbyists, who felt that the RCMP exceeded their authority, and that such policy changes should be enacted by legislation.

The National Firearms Association of Canada considered pursuit of the matter through the legal system. On 31 July 2015, the Canadian government overturned the reclassification and returned the Swiss rifles to the original classifications.

On 1 May 2020, in the wake of the Nova Scotia attacks, the rifles were again reclassified as Prohibited Firearms via Order in Council.

== Design details ==
=== Operating mechanism ===
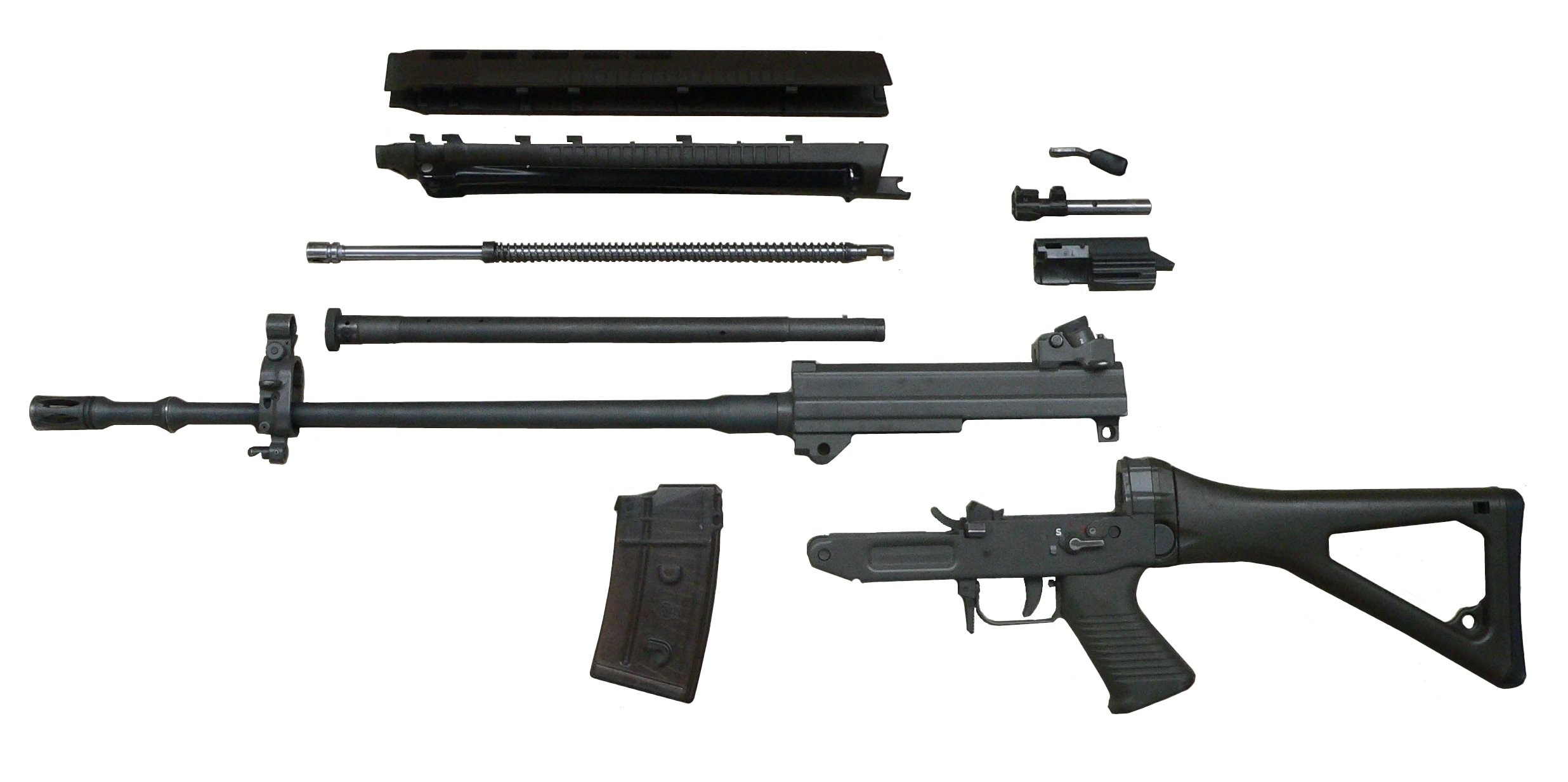
SG 550 disassembled into its main constituent groups

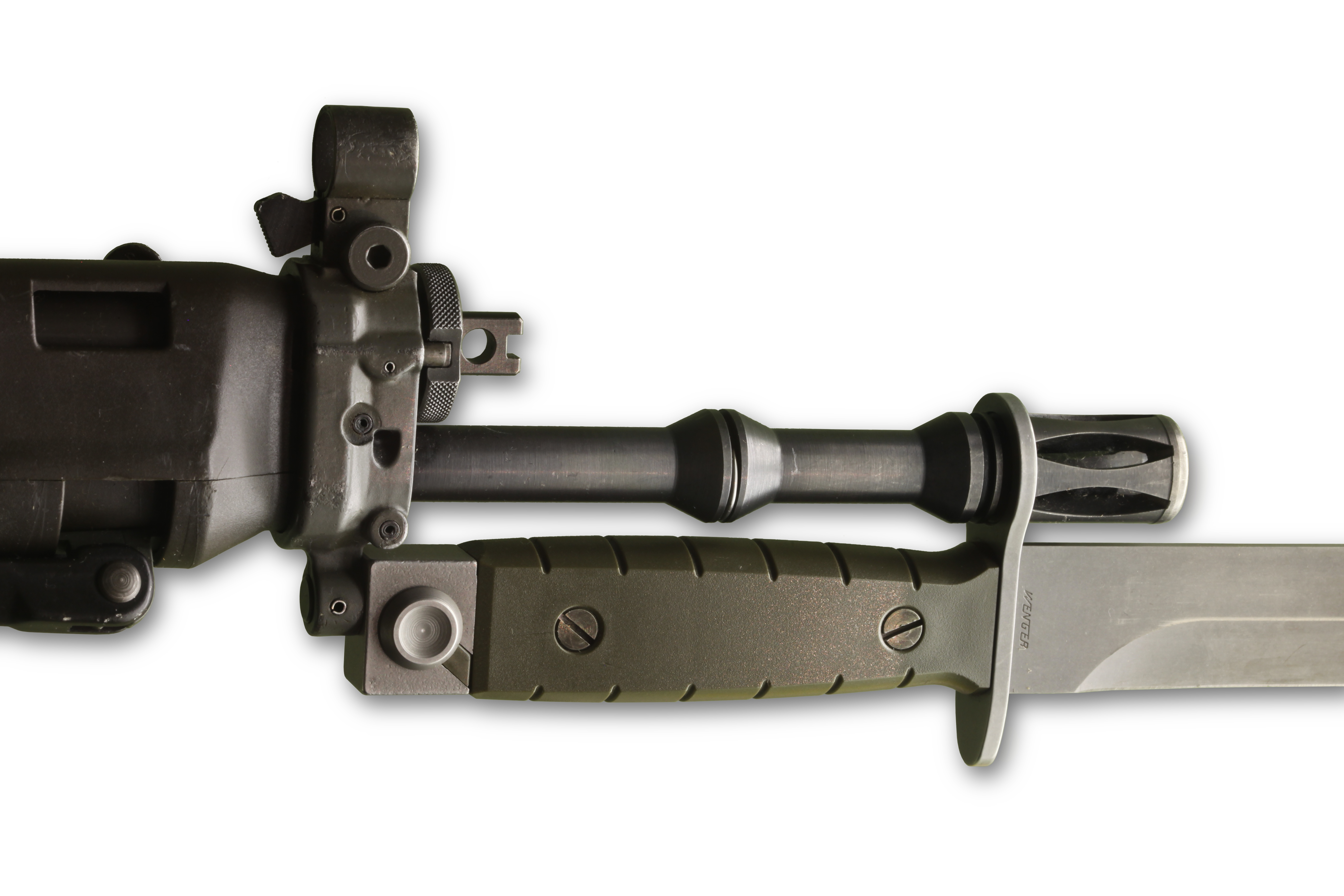
A close-up look on the integrated adjustable gas regulator on the gas block, the front sight with a flip-up night sight post, and the bayonet lug attaches on the flash suppressor

The SG 550 is a selective-fire 5.56×45mm NATO assault rifle firing from a closed bolt. It has a gas-actuated piston-driven long-stroke operating system derived from the SIG SG 540 series of rifles, which uses burnt powder gases vented through a port in the barrel to power the weapon's moving parts. Once inside the gas cylinder, propellant gases pass through an L-shaped channel machined in the piston head and are directed forward towards the gas valve. The pressure build-up in front of the piston head pushes the piston and bolt carrier rearward. As the piston is driven back, the gas port and the L-shaped channel move out of alignment, cutting off the supply of gas to the cylinder. Surplus gas and powder residues are evacuated through an exhaust port in the gas cylinder. The manually adjustable gas valve has two settings, one for normal operation, and the second setting for use in the presence of heavy fouling or icing.

The rotary bolt locking mechanism consists of two steel locking lugs that engage locking recesses in the breech, and is identical to that used in the SG 540. A spring-loaded extractor is incorporated into the bolt while a fixed protrusion on one of the receiver's internal guide rails ejects the spent cartridge casings.

=== Features ===
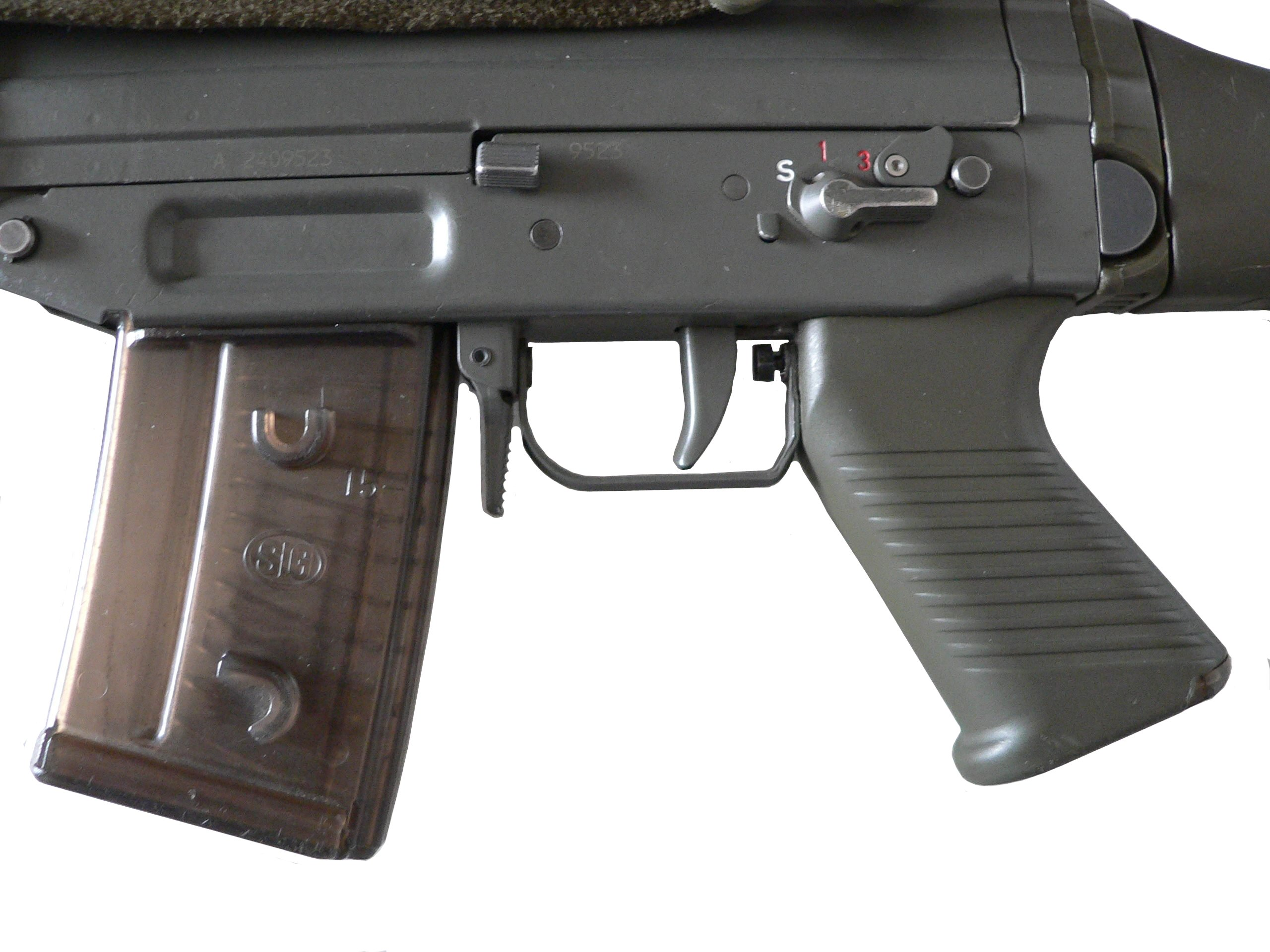
The rifle controls, including fire selector/safety.

The rifle is hammer-fired and has a trigger mechanism with an ambidextrous safety and fire selector switch that has 4 settings: "S"—safe, "1"—single fire, "3"—3-round burst and "20"—fully automatic fire. The 3-round burst mode "3" and the fully automatic "20" position can be disabled by a rotating safety guard to avert accidentally activating the continuous fire mode. The trigger is enclosed in a pivoting trigger guard which can be folded down to the left or right side allowing for unhindered operation with winter gloves. The trigger pull is approximately 35 N (7.9 lb_{f}).

The firearm is fed by lightweight 20-round box magazines, 30-, 10- and 5-round magazines are also available. The magazines are molded from a translucent polymer and can be locked together using studs in order to facilitate quicker reloading (Jungle style). The empty weight of a 20-round magazine is 95 g (3.4 oz) and 110 g (3.9 oz) for a 30-round magazine.

A bolt hold-open device locks the bolt carrier assembly open after expending the last cartridge from the magazine and is released by lifting the bolt catch lever located on the left side of the receiver. Alternatively, a left-handed shooter may release the bolt by pulling the rubber-coated charging handle to rear a short distance.

The SG 550 has a side-folding skeletonized buttstock (folds to the right side of the receiver) and a lightweight aluminium bipod that folds into grooves in the lower handguard. The hinged stock is firmly locked in the folded position by a socket in the butt which clips into a plastic stud on the handguard; a firm pull will release the stock which is then swung into the closed position and locked by a button catch. A collapsible side-folding stock is also available. The stock, pistol grip, and handguards are made of a high-strength polymer, and are produced in either green or black colour options. The steel receiver housing and several other components are manufactured using stamping and welding; external steel surfaces are finished with a ceramic-reinforced enamel coat known as Ilaflon.

The heavy, cold hammer-forged barrel is screwed into the receiver and is equipped with a slotted "bird cage" type flash suppressor that is also used to launch rifle grenades (using standard, live ammunition) or attach a knife bayonet (the bayonet is supported by a lug located at the base of the gas block). The rifled barrel has 6 right-hand grooves and the Swiss Army specification 254 mm (1:10 in) rifling twist rate is optimized for Swiss military GP 90 ammunition. An export-oriented 5.56×45mm NATO barrel configuration with a 178 mm (1:7 in) twist rate is also available, to adequately stabilize the relatively long NATO L110/M856 5.56×45mm NATO tracer projectile.

All rifles are test fired for accuracy and function prior to leaving the factory at the manufacturer's underground 300 m test range. Random new rifles out of production were tested on a machine rest. In a 24 single shot string starting with a cold weapon and using GP 90 ammunition, the R_{50} or 50% windage and elevation dispersion of any individual weapon must have been within an 11 cm (4.3 in) group at 300 m, the 50% windage and elevation dispersion must have averaged 7 cm (2.8 in). The employed circular error probable method cannot be converted and is not comparable to US military methods for determining rifle accuracy. When the R_{50} results are doubled the hit probability increases to 93.7%.

The gas system's components are made of stainless steel. The barrel, bolt, bolt carrier, and firing pin are all made with steel that has been gas nitrided, hardened and tempered. The bolt and carrier, along with most other components internal to the receiver undergo a phosphating process.

=== Sights ===
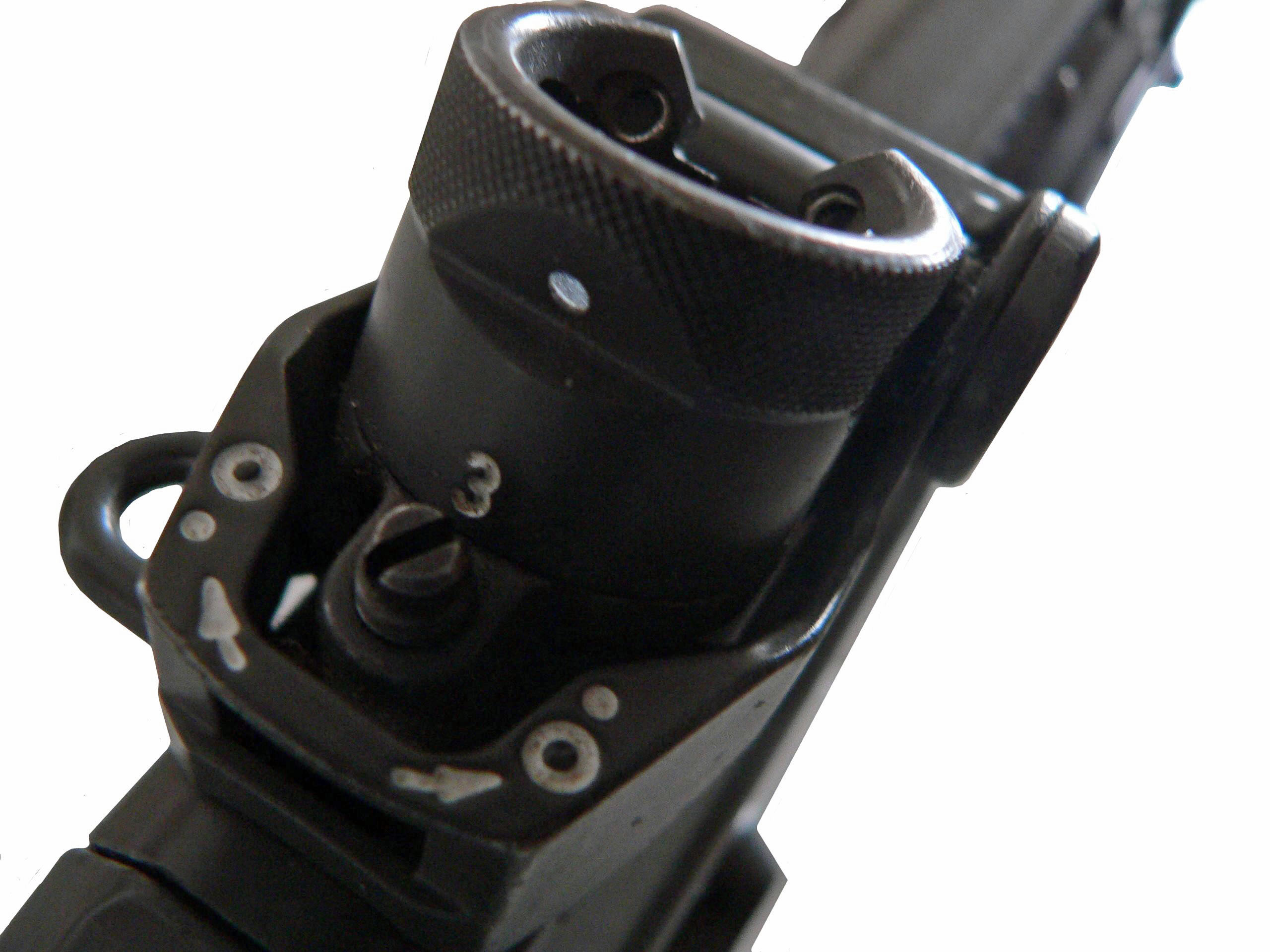
Rotating diopter drum rear sight.

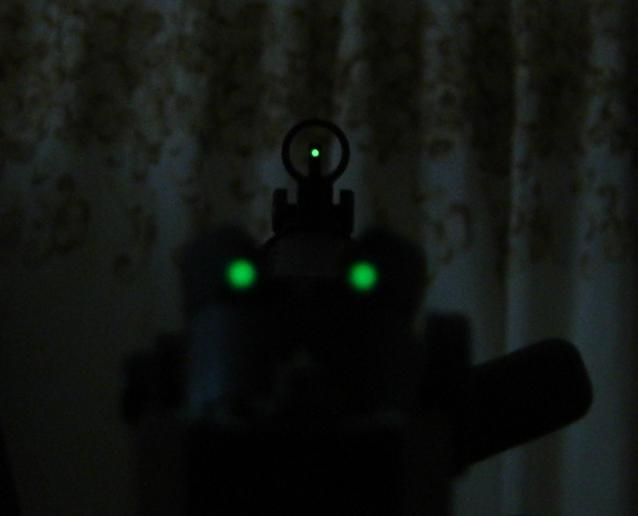
Tritium-illuminated night sights.

The SG 550 series rifles have a 540 mm (21.3 in) long sight radius and are equipped with iron sights adjustable for both windage and elevation. The sights are similar to those on some Heckler & Koch weapons, such as the HK G3 or HK MP5. The sights consist of a rear, rotating diopter drum soldered to the receiver and a hooded front post installed in the gas block. The rear sight has an open notch setting marked "1" designed for immediate firing up to 100 m but also contains apertures with settings "2", "3" and "4" corresponding to 200, 300 and 400 m firing ranges. The 400 m setting has a removable iris for sportive shooting. The sights are adjustable via micrometer screws with windage and elevation increments of 0.15 mil (≈0.52 moa), or 15 mm (0.6 in) at 100 m. For night use, the dedicated "1" notch setting in the rear sight drum is provided with two self-luminous tritium-powered inserts fitted laterally on each side of the notch and additionally in a flip-up post attached to the foresight. When firing rifle grenades the front sight hood is aligned with the uppermost edge of the grenade's warhead, this provides an estimated point of impact up to 75 m. The rifle grenades intended for this purpose were FN/Luchaire Type 58-N bullet-through anti-tank grenades.

For designated marksman use, the SG 550 is equipped with a Kern 4×24 telescopic sight on a quick-detachable mount. The sight weighs 730 g (26 oz) and includes a variety of features, such as STANAG 2324/MIL-STD-1913 compliant mounting components, a Bullet Drop Compensation (BDC) elevation adjustment knob for ranges from 100 to 600 m, a tritium-illuminated reticle that enables target acquisition in low-light conditions and a diopter eyesight correction adjustment. Included with the sight is a lens hood for mounting on the ocular that reduces image quality-impairing stray light and a gray filter for glare reduction. The basic model of this optical sight was already used on the Stgw 57.

The upper receiver can accept quick-detachable rails and adapters used to mount optics (STANAG 2324 compliant). The scope mounting system consists of a centering hole located on the front face of the rear sight assembly and a dovetail-like mounting point at the front end of the receiver. Swiss Arms (respectively Brügger & Thomet) offer several types of quick-release scope mounts and Picatinny rails. A version of the rifle with an integral receiver-mounted Picatinny rail is also offered; in this configuration the weapon is fitted with flip-up emergency battle sights—a rear aperture sight which folds down into a recess in the rail and a folding front blade.

=== Accessories ===
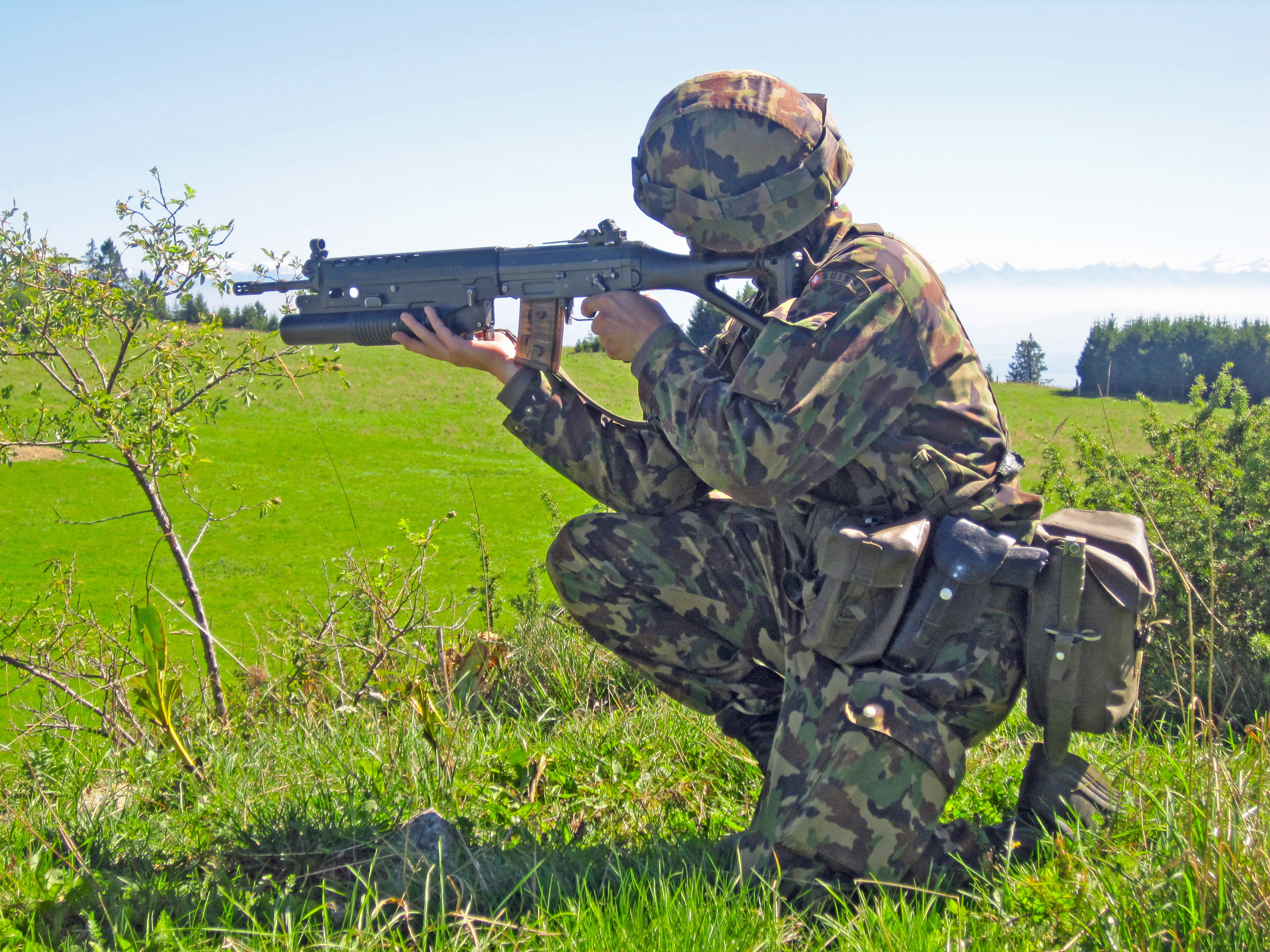
Swiss soldier with a SG 550 and a GL 5040/5140 grenade launcher

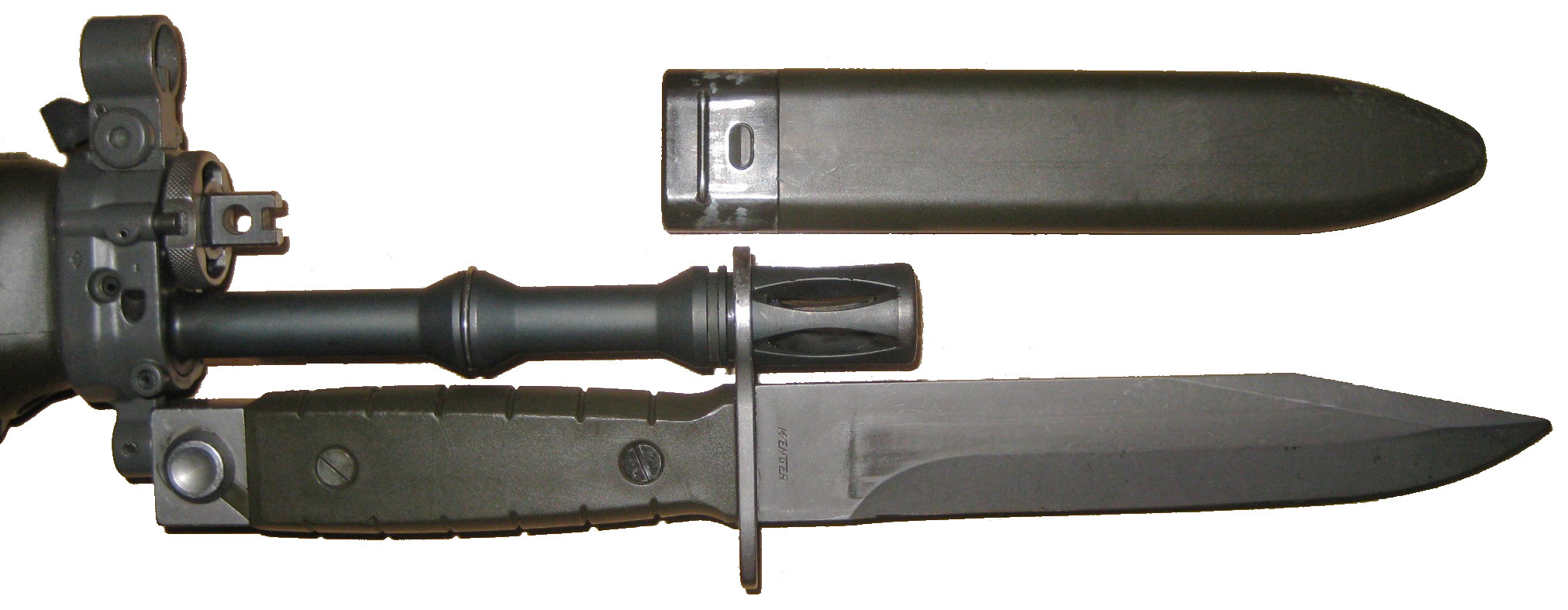
Stgw 90 bayonet made by Wenger

Both the rifle and carbine come standard with a spare magazine, sling, cleaning kit and a loading aid for rapid magazine filling.

The full-sized SG 550/551 will accept SIG's 40 mm GL 5040/5140 grenade launcher (Swiss military designation: 40 mm Gewehraufsatz 97), which is mounted under the barrel via an eccentric latch and replaces the lower handguard. The grenade launcher is a single-shot breech-loaded weapon that is supplied with a leaf sight that attaches to the rifle's rear sight base and enables accurate firing out to 200 m. The lightweight aluminium launcher weighs 1.7 kg (3.7 lb) unloaded, and is operated independently of the rifle. It can use a wide array of 40×46mm grenades, including extended range high-pressure types and non-lethal baton or anti-riot projectiles. The compact SG 552/553 can be fitted with smaller GL 5340 underbarrel grenade launcher.

An Stgw 90 bayonet can also be mounted to the rifle. The bayonet has an overall length of 310 mm and a muzzle ring diameter of 22 mm. The 177 mm long blade is single-edged and it has no fuller. The bayonets are manufactured exclusively for the Swiss Army by Victorinox and in the past by Wenger until Victorinox acquired Wenger in 2005. With a proper lug adaptor, the rifle will also accept a NATO-pattern KCB-77 (made originally by Carl Eickhorn of Solingen, West Germany) or the American M9.

== Variants ==
=== SG 550 ===
The SG 550 was adopted by the Swiss Armed Forces as the Stgw 90.

==== SG 550-1 Sniper ====
The SG 550-1 Sniper variant was designed as a precision/marksman rifle at the request of the Swiss Police. Introduced in 1988, This accurized rifle has a refined two-stage trigger (the pull force was reduced from 35 N (7.9 lb_{f}) to 15 N (3.4 lb_{f}), a heavy, hammer-forged 650 mm (25.6 in) long barrel with a 254 mm (1:10 in) rifling twist rate (it has no flash hider) and is used exclusively with telescopic sights. The new folding stock has an adjustable cheek piece and a spacer system on the butt, the ergonomic pistol grip's angle of inclination can be regulated, the forend was shortened, and the bipod features a height and cant adjustment mechanism. This model is no longer in production.

=== SG 551 ===
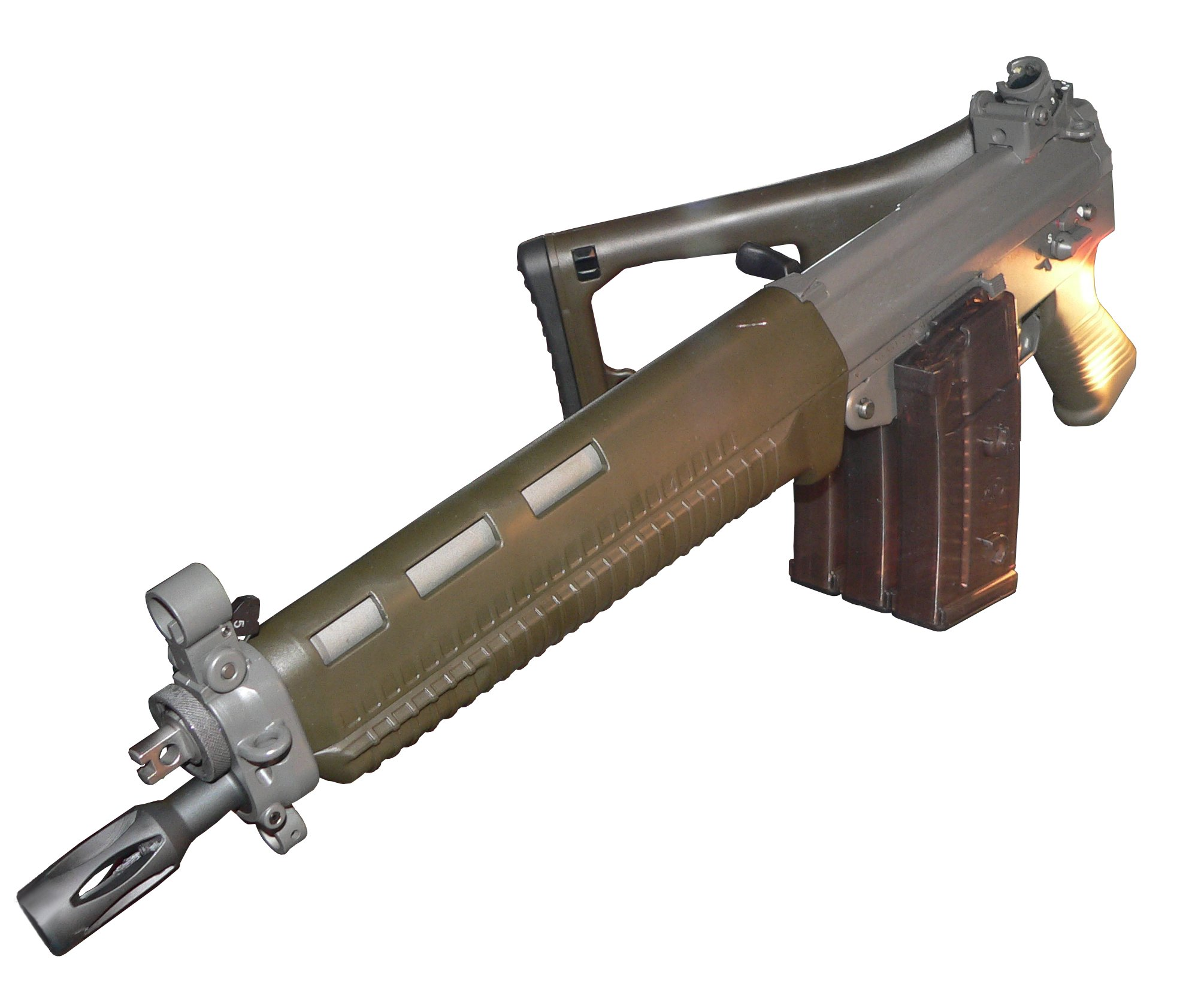
SG 551 carbine

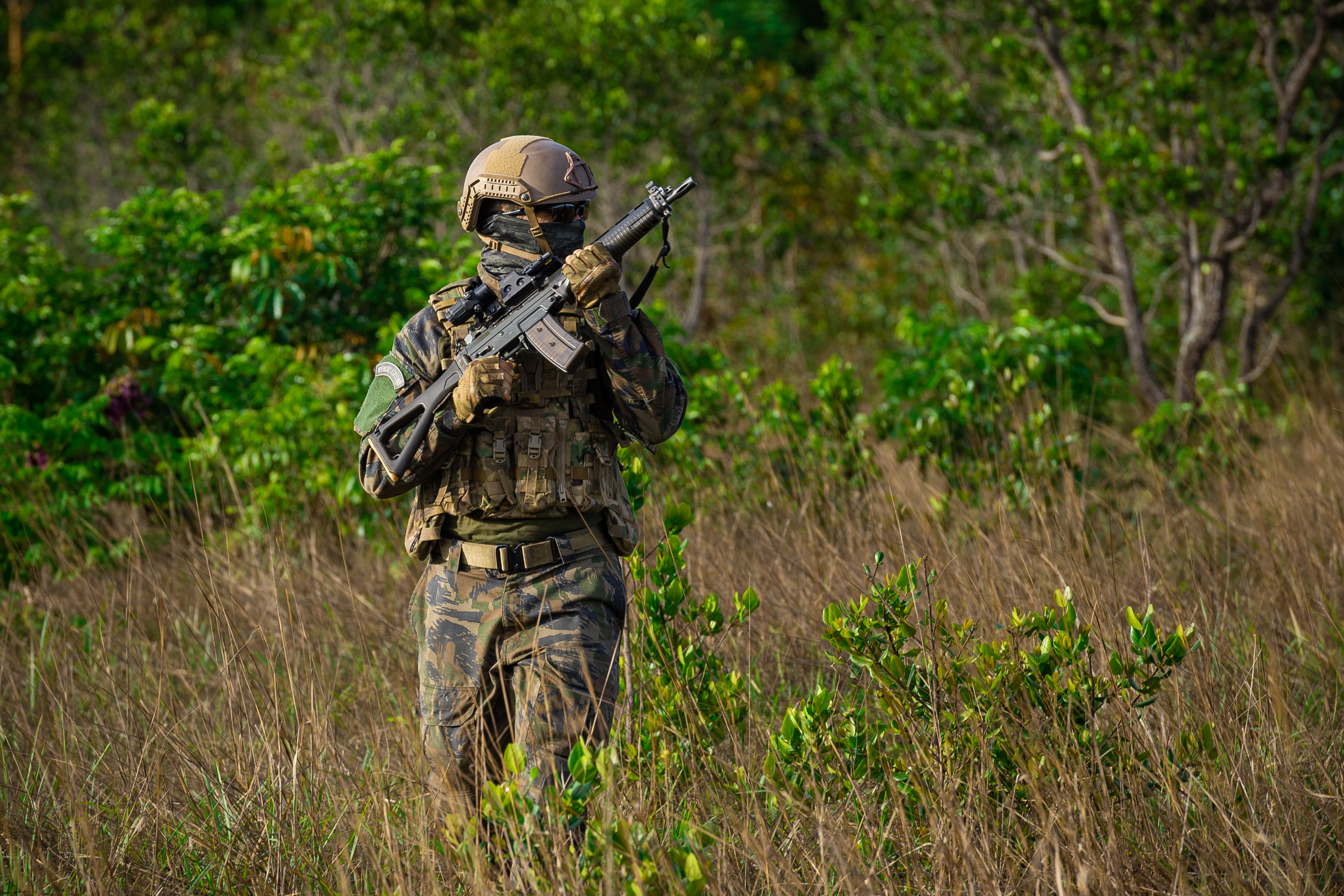
Brazilian special forces with the SG 551

The SG 551 carbine introduced in 1990, has a short pattern 363 mm (14.3 in) barrel, gas tube and piston compared to the SG 550. The SG 551 series rifles have a 466 mm (18.3 in) long sight radius. The handguards were also changed and the bipod removed. The SG 551 cannot be used with a bayonet or fire rifle grenades. The SG 551 comes in several specialized variants designed for use with security and special forces. Among those variants are:

- SG 551-1P police carbine, designed to engage point targets out to 300 m; equipped with a Hensoldt 6×42 BL telescopic sight and detachable cheek riser.
- SG 551 SWAT carbine, coated with a corrosion-resistant finish and equipped with an optical sight mount used with a wide array of sights, and can also accept mission-critical accessories such as a bipod, laser pointer or tactical light.
- SG 551 LB carbine with an extended 454 mm (17.9 in) barrel that enables the use of rifle grenades and a bayonet.

=== SG 552 Commando ===
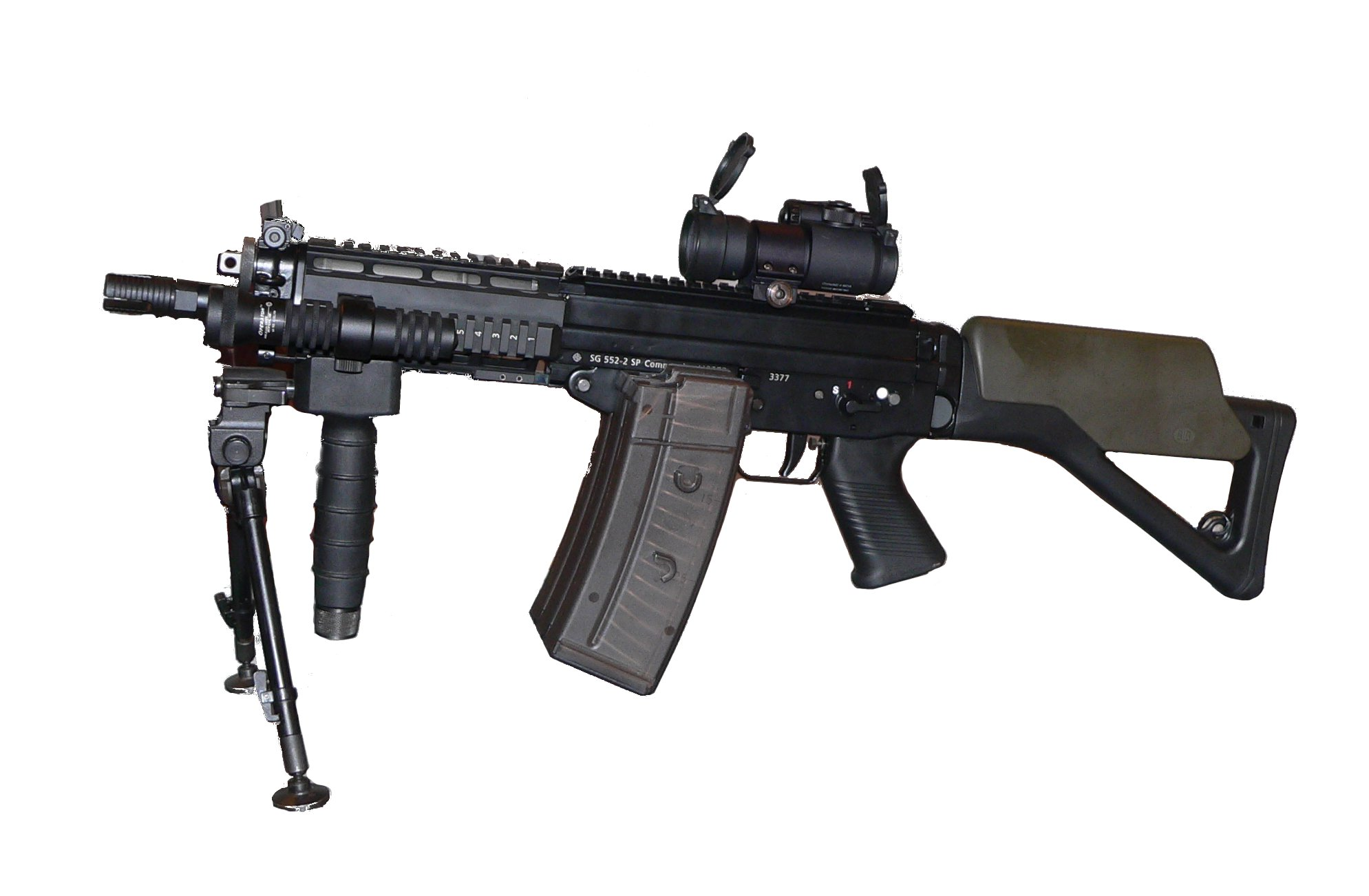
SG 552 Commando

The compact SG 552 Commando (full designation as the 552-2P) carbine was released in July 1998. It has a shorter 226 mm (8.9 in) barrel (with an open, 3-prong flash suppressor) and gas tube, ventilated handguards and a redesigned bolt carrier group that was integrated with the piston rod to form a single moving assembly. The SG 552 series rifles have a 360 mm (14.2 in) long sight radius. The return mechanism has been moved to the rear of the receiver housing and its recoil spring is guided in a way analogous to that of the AK-47: on a steel guide rod (later models feature a polymer guide rod) resting against the lower receiver's rear surface under tension of the compressed recoil spring. Like the SG 550/551, this model can accept rails and accessories enabling the use of optics. A long barrel version of the SG 552 known as the SG 552 LB incorporates a 346 mm (13.6 in) barrel with provision to fire rifle grenades and support a bayonet. The SG 552 models were discontinued in 2008 and replaced by the SG 553. Upgrade part kits are available to convert a SG 552 in to a SG 553.

==== SG 552-A1 ====
The SG 552-A1 is a SG 552 rifle that has been modified to function like the SG 553. The modifications are available as a conversion kit that includes a new bolt carrier, charging handle, recoil spring and gas tube.

=== SG 553 ===
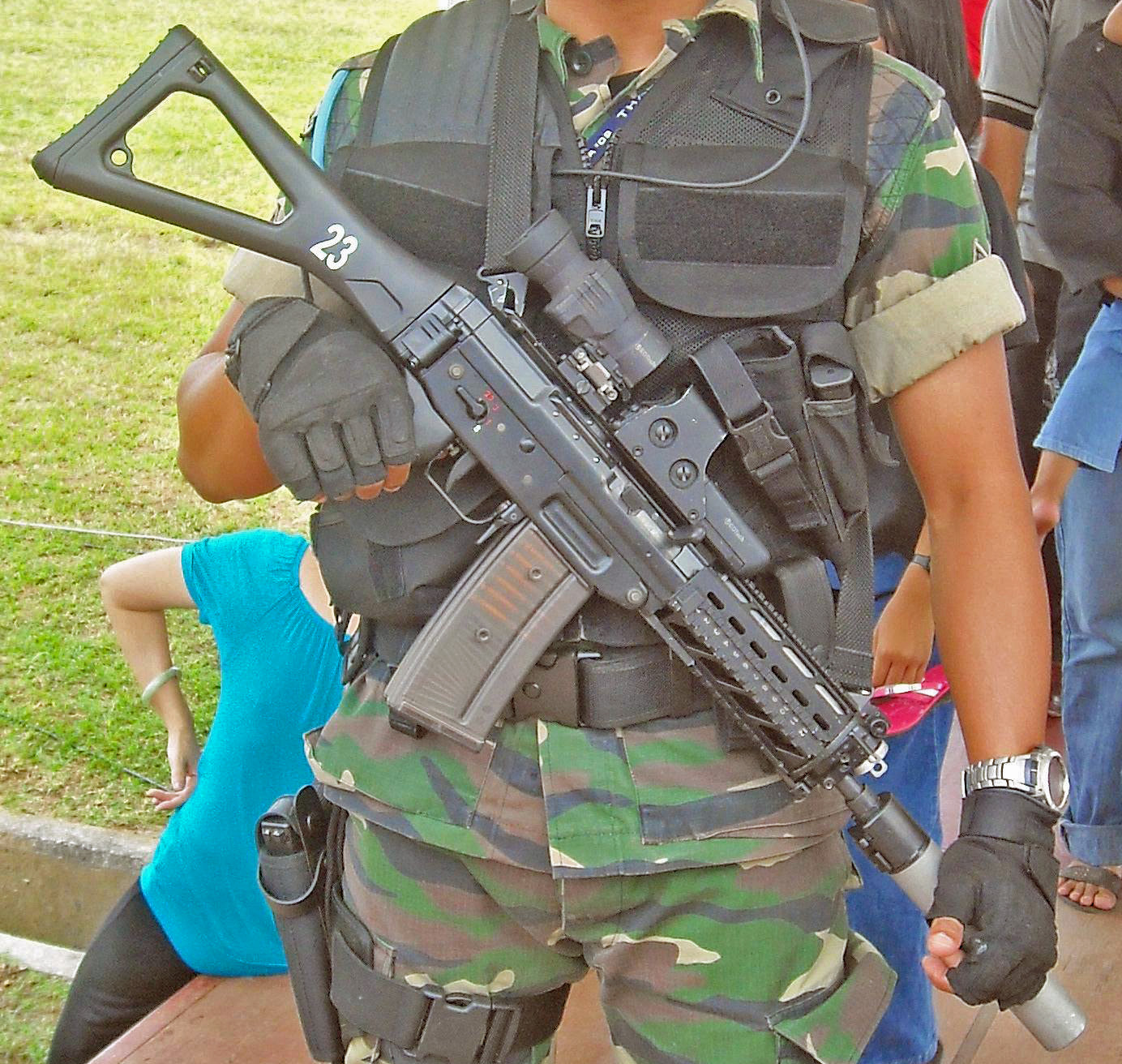
SG 553 in the hands of Malaysian Air Force PASKAU commando during LIMA 2009

The SG 553 is an improved version of the SG 552 and was released in 2008. Even though it mostly resembles the SG 552, the SG 553 has one key advantage, the recoil spring is now wrapped around the piston rod as in the SG 550/551 models, which address several reliability issues encountered in the SG 552 and also allows the usage of the standard SG 550/551 charging handle. The SG 553 series rifles have a 339 mm (13.3 in) long sight radius. A long barrel version of the SG 553 known as the SG 553 LB incorporates a 347 mm (13.7 in) barrel with provision to fire rifle grenades and support a bayonet. Further factory options for the SG 553 rifle series are an integrated receiver Picatinny rail and an adjustable butt stock. The SG 553 R is a variant chambered for the 7.62×39mm cartridge fed from AK family box magazines. There is also a .300 AAC Blackout variant of the SG 553 known as the SG 553 BK which was first shown at IWA OutdoorClassics in 2016.

=== SG 750 and SG 751 SAPR ===
The SG 750 and SG 751 SAPR are fully powered rifle variants of the SG 550, which features a cyclic rate of fire of around 650–700 rounds per minute and was first announced in 2004. The SG 750 rifle is chambered in 6.5mm Creedmoor, while the SG 751 SAPR is chambered in 7.62×51mm NATO and was adopted by the Swiss Armed Forces as their designated marksman rifle. Both the SG 750 precision rifle and SG 751 SAPR battle rifle are also available for the civilian market and have select-fire versions in the military.

=== Civilian variants ===
The SIG 550/551/552/553 are also available in semi-automatic only configurations, intended for the civilian shooting market. Among these variants are the SIG 550/551/552 SP, PE 90 and SIG Sport rifles. The SIG 550 series is available with either 178 mm or 254 mm (1:7 and 1:10 in) twist rate barrels. Rifles designated SG 55x-1 have a 254 mm (1:10 in) twist rate, while models marked SG 55x-2 have a 178 mm (1:7 in) twist rate. The ordinance GP 90 ammunition is optimized for use with the original Swiss 254 mm (1:10 in) rifling twist rate.

=== SIG 556 ===
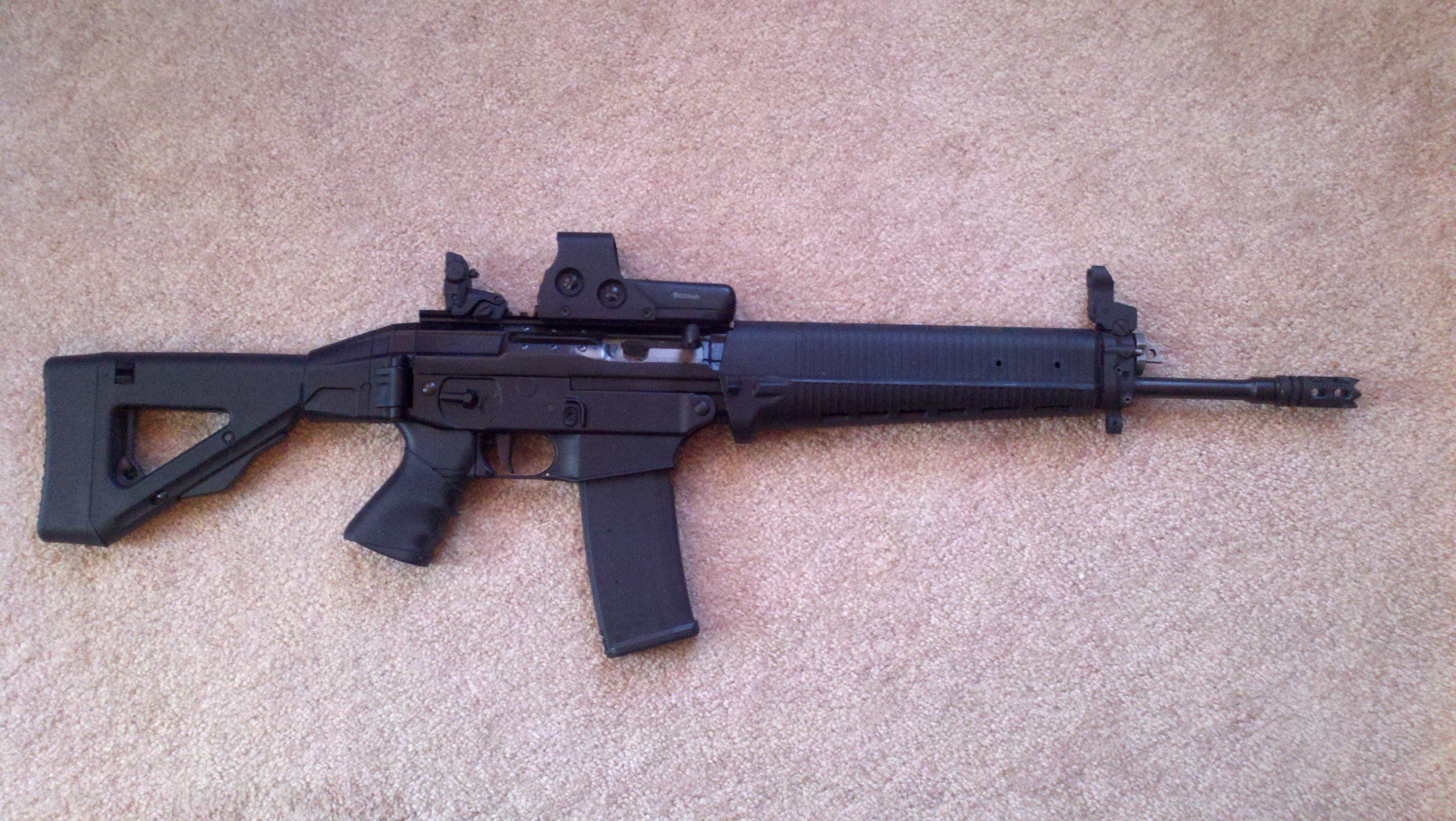
SIG 556 Classic equipped with an EOTech 512 holographic weapon sight and STANAG magazine

Due to import restrictions, the American civilian market required a partially American-made version assembled by SIG Sauer, Inc. in Exeter, New Hampshire. The SIG 556 is designed to meet these requirements. The overall length is 940 mm (37.0 in). One difference is a new aluminum lower receiver that accepts M16 STANAG magazines and an M4 telescoping buttstock. The barrel's twist rate is 178 mm (1:7 in).

There are many variants of this rifle offered for sale. The first variant was sold with an aluminum Picatinny rail on the upper receiver and a series of plastic rails on the handguard. The market pushed SIG to produce the rifle with the slimmer profile 551-type handguards and a hooded front sight; this version is marketed as the SIG 556 Classic. Several folding stock models have been released as well as variants with railed forend combinations. Another variant is the SIG 556 DMR featuring a 18 in (457.2 mm) barrel. SIG P556 pistol variants with 10-inch barrels are also available. In 2012 the SIG 556 R or SIG 556 Russian chambered for the 7.62×39mm cartridge and using AK-pattern box magazines was introduced. The first generation of SIG 556R rifles had a number of performance issues that were later resolved in later production runs of the SIG 556R.

In January 2014, SIG introduced the 556xi series rifles as an improvement of the SIG 556 and SIG 556R series of rifles.

As of May 2017, SIG has discontinued the SIG 556, SIG 556R, and 556xi series of rifles and no longer displays those models on the products section of their website.

==== SIG 522LR ====
The SIG 522LR is a .22-caliber sporting rifle styled after the SG 551. It uses a simple blowback semi-automatic operating system and its barrel has a 406 mm (1:16 in) twist rate. Due to its operating principle, the rifle has no mechanical commonality with other SG 550 variants. The SIG 522 accepts commonly available AR-style .22-caliber conversion magazines.

In the U.S., a variety of semi-automatic SwissArms firearms are available for sale. Due to U.S. import regulations, they are imported as a pistol.

=== SG 560 ===
The SG 560 was introduced in 2024 as a next-generation rifle series by the Swiss Shooting Association to commemorate its 200th anniversary. It features SIG MCX-like upgrades and magwell adapters, allowing the use of both SG 550 magazines and STANAG magazines. Variants in the series include the SG 560, SG 561, and SG 563 LB / SB / R / BK, which are convertible to 7.62×39mm and .300 Blackout.

== Gallery ==
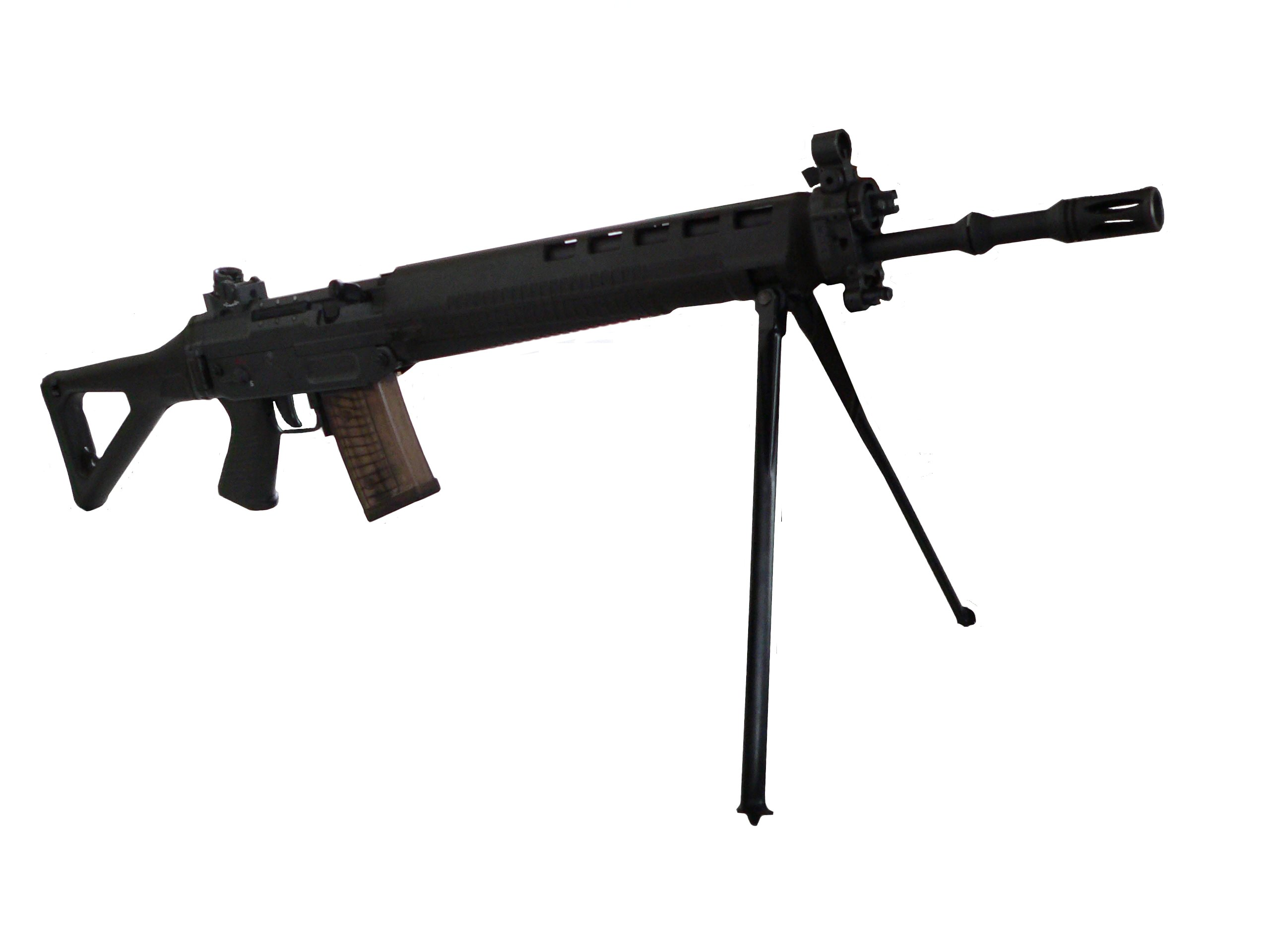
SG 550 with its bipod extended

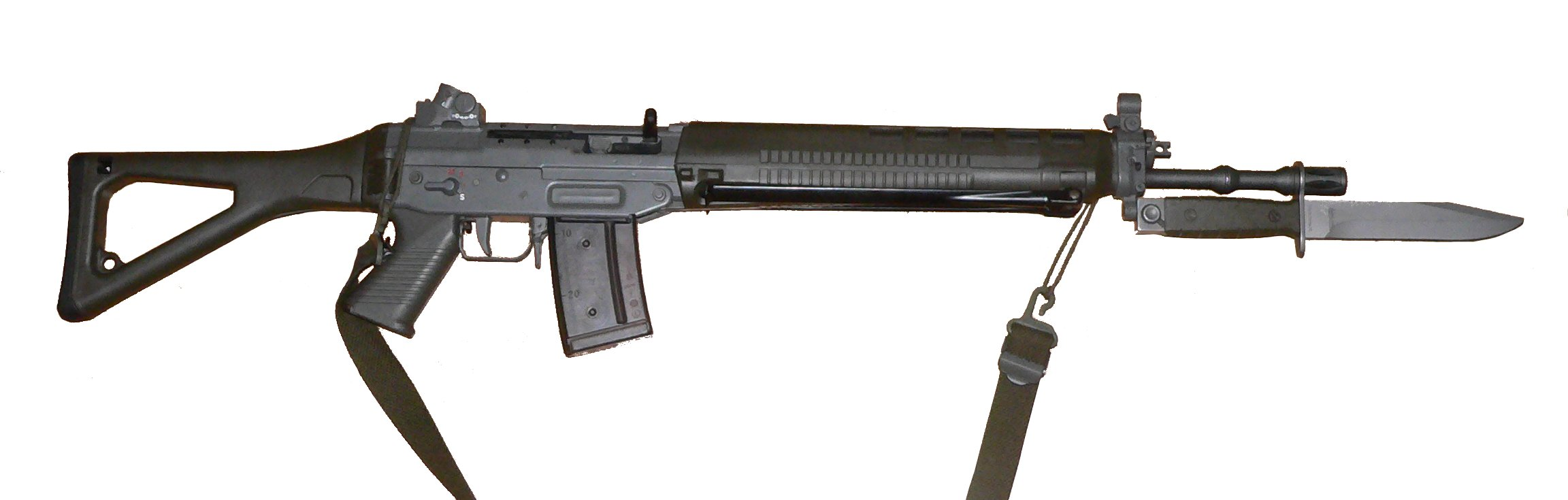
SG 550 with a bayonet

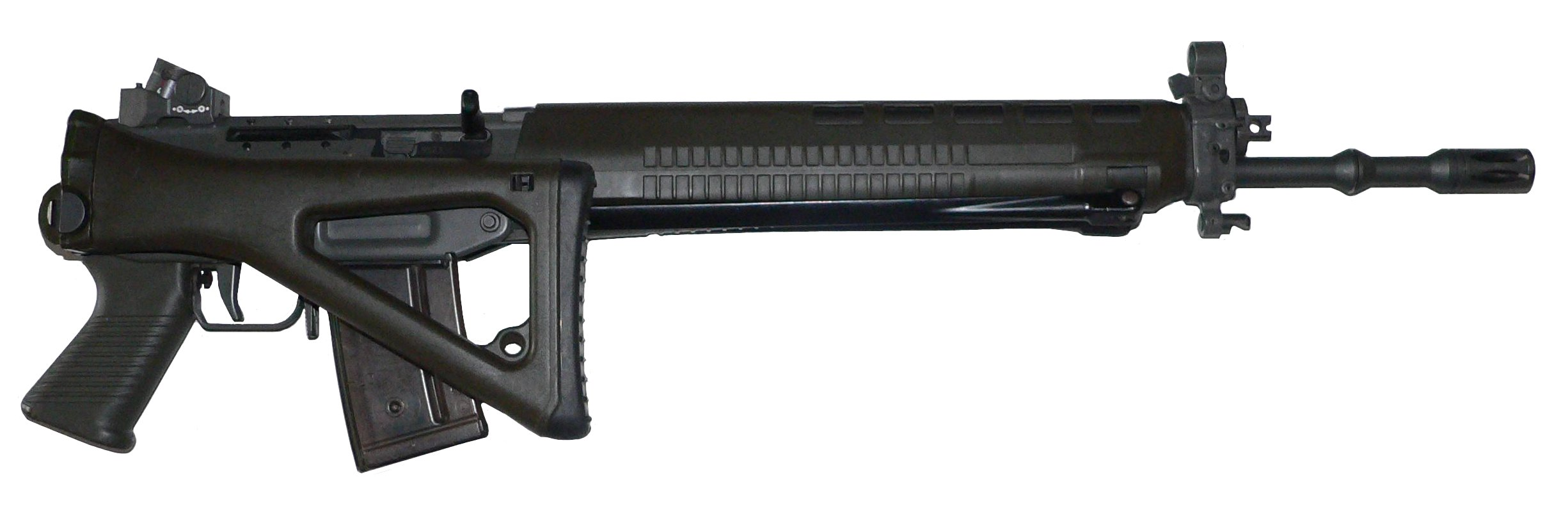
SG 550 with its stock folded

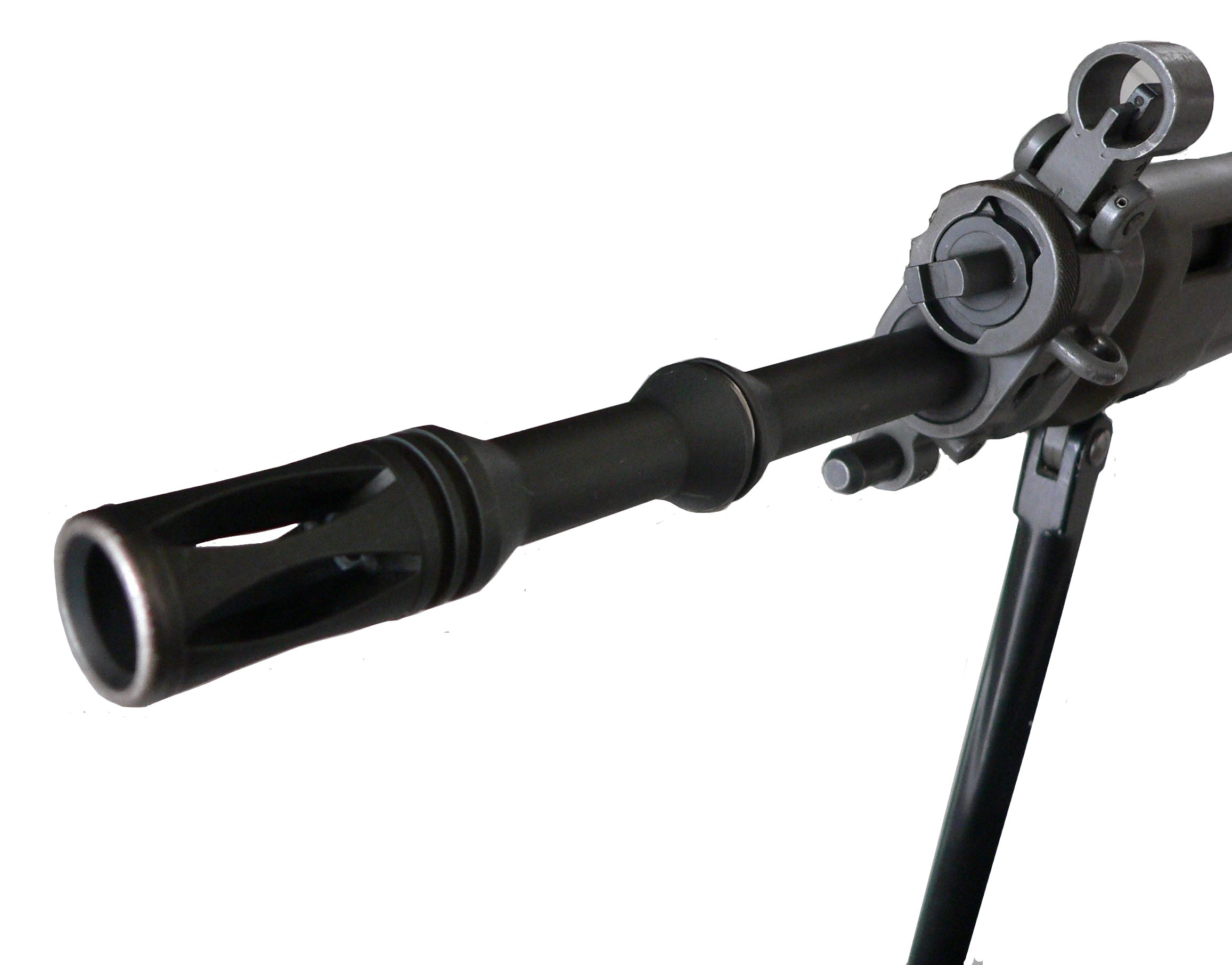
A close-up look on the flash suppressor and gas regulator

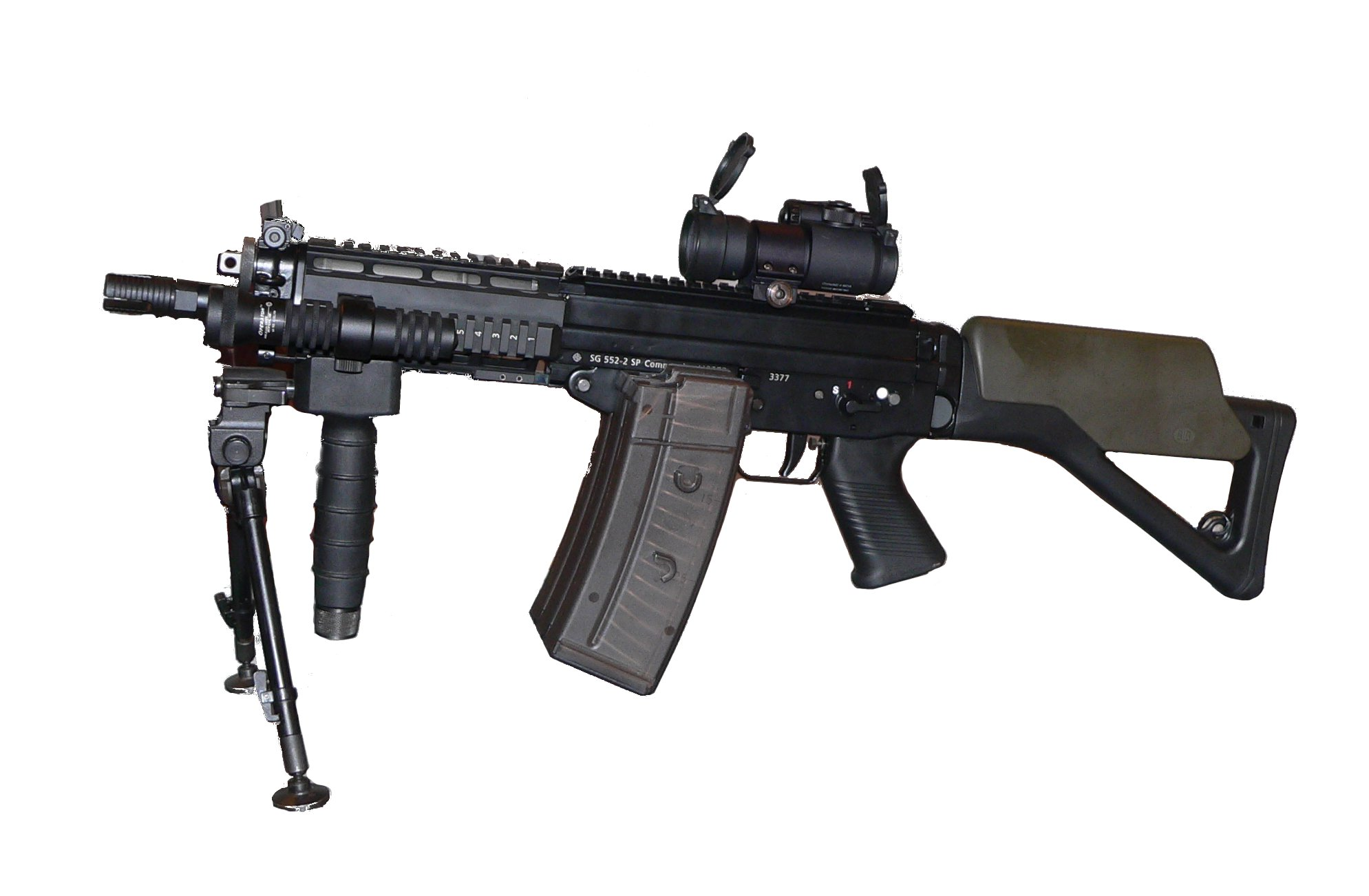
SG 552 Commando with an integral Picatinny rail and various accessories

== Users ==
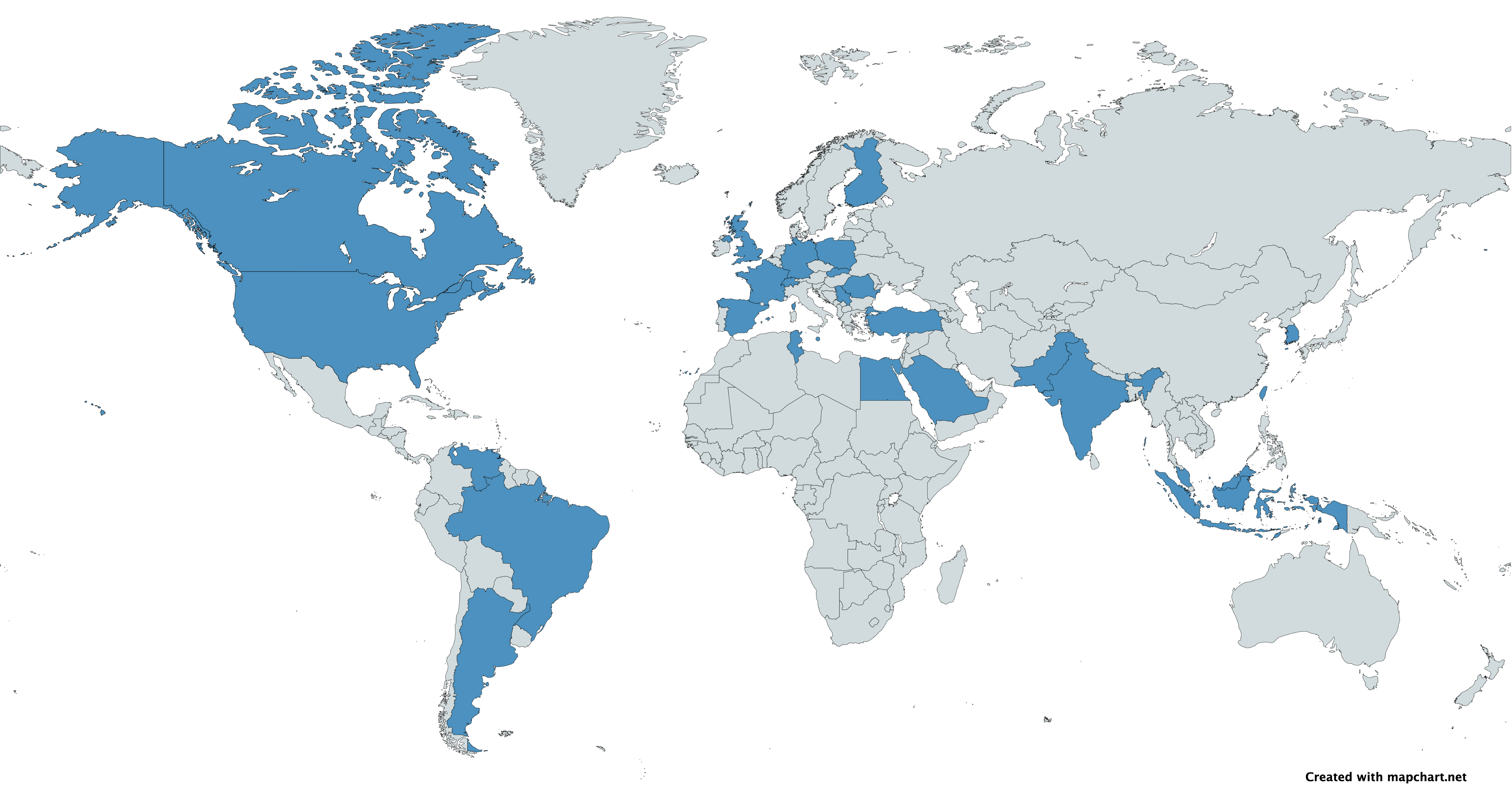
Map with SIG SG 550 users in blue

Country/Territory	Organization	Model	Quantity	Date	Reference
Argentina	GEOF, Federal Police Grupo de Especial de Seguridad, Policia de Mendoza	SG 553 SOW SG 556	_	_	
Brazil	Brazilian Federal Police, Brazilian Air Force PARA-SAR	SG 550; SG 551	_	_	
Canada	Lethbridge Police Service	SG 553	_	_	
Canada		SG 553	_	_	
Egypt	Sa'ka Forces and Unit 777	SG 552	_	_	
Finland	Helsinki Police Department, Karhu Team	SG 552	_	_	
France	Special Operations Command of the French Army	SG 551; SG 551 LB	_	_	
France	National Gendarmerie Intervention Group (GIGN) of the National Gendarmerie	SG 553 SOW	_	_	
Germany	GSG 9 of the German Federal Police	SG 553 SOW	_	_	
Germany	Spezialeinsatzkommando (Special Task Force) groups of some Landespolizei (State Police)	SG 553 SOW	_	_	
India	National Security Guard	SG 551	675	~2010	
Indonesia	Komando Pasukan Khusus (Kopassus) special forces group of the Indonesian Army	SG 550; SG 552	_	_	
Indonesia	Komando Pasukan Katak (Kopaska) tactical diver group of the Indonesian Navy	SG 550; SG 552	_	_	
Indonesia	Indonesian Marine Corps	SG 550-1	_	_	
Malaysia	Grup Gerak Khas (GGK) Counter-Terrorism Forces of the Malaysian Army	SG 553 LB; SG 553 SB	_	_	
Malaysia	JMF Elite Forces Counter-Terrorism Forces of the Royal Johor Military Force	SG 553 LB; SG 553 SB	_	_	
Malaysia	Pasukan Khas Udara (PASKAU) Counter-Terrorism Forces of the Royal Malaysian Air Force	SG 553 LB; SG 553 SB	_	_	
Malaysia	Special Task and Rescue (STAR) Maritime Counter-Terrorism Forces of the Malaysian Maritime Enforcement Agency	SG 553 LB; SG 553 SB	_	_	
Malta	Armed Forces of Malta	SG 550	_	_	-
Pakistan	Special Service Group Counter-Terrorism Forces of the Pakistan Army	SG 552	_	_	
Papua New Guinea	Royal Papua New Guinea Constabulary	_	_	_	
Poland	GROM special forces of the Polish Armed Forces	SG-551P SWAT	_	_	
Romania	Detașamentul de Căutare-Salvare prin Luptă (DCSL; Combat Search and Rescue) special forces of the Romanian Air Force	SG 551; SG 552; SG 553	_	_	
Romania	Romanian Naval Forces 307th Marine Infantry Regiment – reconnaissance units	SG 551; SG 552; SG 553	_	_	
Romania	Brigada Specială de Intervenție a Jandarmeriei (BSIJ)	SG 551; SG 552; SG 553	_	_	
Saudi Arabia	Royal Saudi Navy Special Forces Units	SG 556 SWAT; SG 552; SG 556 SBR	_	_	
Serbia	Specijalna Antiteroristicka Jedinica (Special Anti-terrorist Unit) of the Serbian Police	SIG SG 552	_	_	
Slovakia	Útvar Osobitného Určenia (Special Assignments Unit) of the Slovak Police	SG 551 SWAT	_	_	
Republic of Korea	Special Sea Attack Team (SSAT) of the Korea Coast Guard	SG 556	_	_	
Spain	Grupo Especial de Operaciones of the Spanish National Police	SG 551 SWAT; SG 552	_	_	
Switzerland	Swiss Armed Forces	SG 550; SG 552; SG 553	450,000	_	
Taiwan	Wei-An Police Special Services Commando	SG 551-1P	_	1994	
Turkey	Karşı Atak Timi (Counter Attack Team), police special forces of the General Directorate of Security	SG 553	_	_	
Tunisia	Groupe d'Intervention Présidentielle (GIP) special forces of the Presidential Guard	SG 552	_	_	
United Kingdom	West Mercia Police	SG 551 SWAT	_	_	
United Kingdom	Derbyshire Police (previously used)	SG 552	_	_	
United Kingdom	West Yorkshire Police	SG 553	_	_	
United Kingdom	Staffordshire Police	SG 553	_	_	
United States	Drug Enforcement Administration	SG 551; SG 553 SOW	_	_	
United States	Federal Bureau of Investigation	SG 551	_	_	
United States	Special Weapons And Tactics (SWAT) counter-terrorism forces of the United States Capitol Police	SG 550	_	_	-
Vatican City	Pontifical Swiss Guard	SG 550; SG 552	_	_	
Venezuela	Venezuelan Marine Corps	SG 550; SG 552	_	_	

== See also ==
- Gun politics in Switzerland
- List of assault rifles
- List of carbines
- List of sniper rifles
- SIG Sauer SIG516
- SIG SG 530
- SIG SG 540

== Bibliography ==
- Règlement 53.96 Fusil d'assaut 5.6 mm 1990
