= Bodeo Model 1889 =

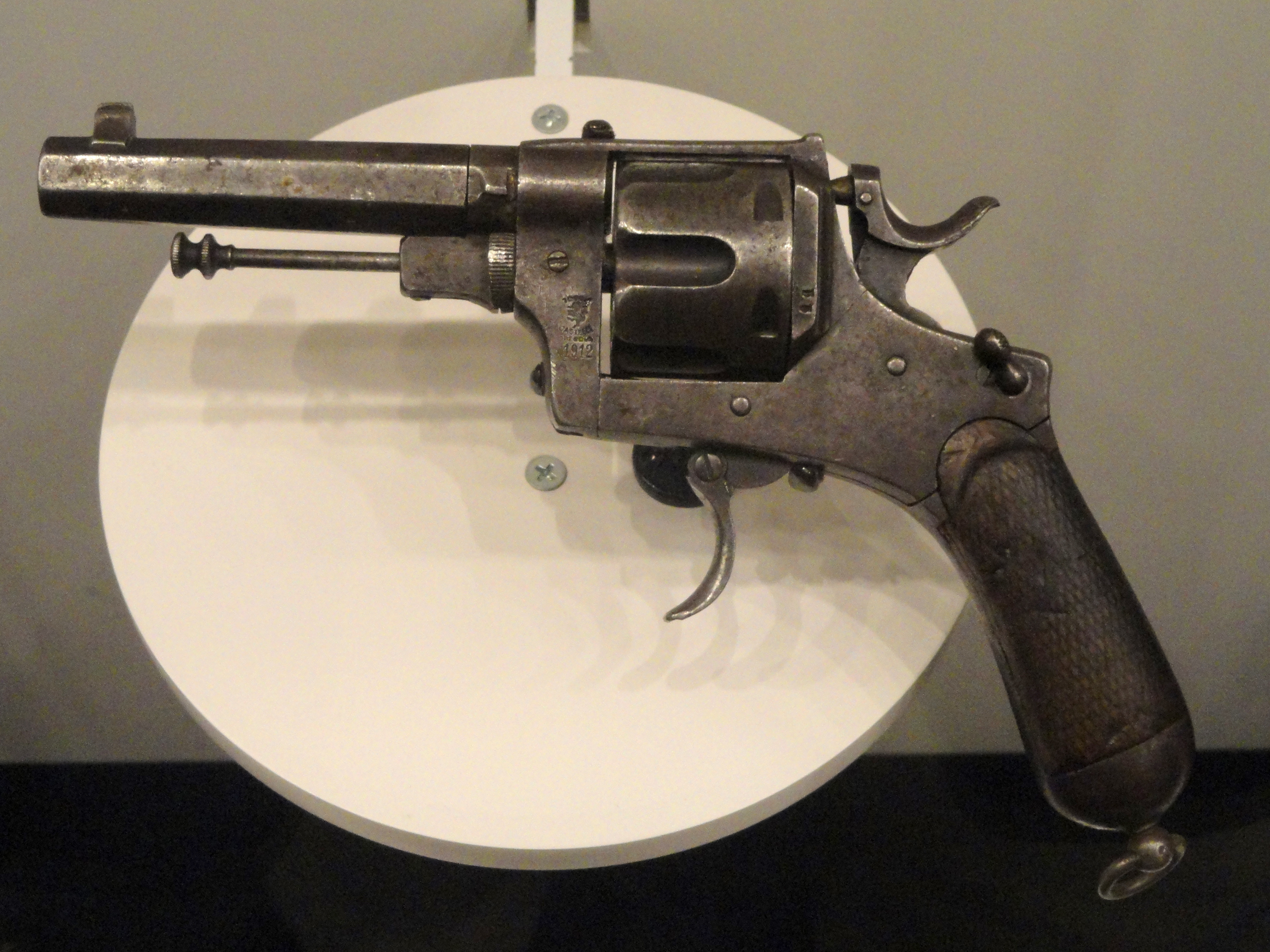
- A Bodeo Model 1889, with folding trigger.
- Type: Service revolver
- Place of origin: Kingdom of Italy

Service history
- Used by: Royal Italian Army
- Wars: Italo-Turkish War; Boxer Rebellion; World War I Second Italo-Abyssinian War; Spanish Civil War; World War II

Production history
- Produced: 1889 to c. 1931

Specifications
- Mass: 950 g (2 lb 2 oz)
- Length: 232 mm (9.1 in)
- Barrel length: 115 mm (4.5 in)
- Cartridge: 10.35mm Ordinanza Italiana
- Action: Single-action
- Muzzle velocity: 256 m/s (840 ft/s)
- Feed system: 6 round cylinder
- Sights: Fixed iron sights

The Bodeo Model 1889 (Italian: Pistola a Rotazione, Sistema Bodeo, Modello 1889) was an Italian revolver named after the head of the Italian firearm commission, Carlo Bodeo. It was produced by a wide variety of manufacturers between 1889 and 1931 in both Spain and Italy. The Bodeo was employed by the Royal Italian Army in World War I, the Interwar Italian colonial wars, and World War II. The Bodeo was manufactured in three distinct varieties, the Tipo A for Enlisted soldiers, the Tipo B for Officers.

== History ==
Made by a large variety of Italian gun-makers, the Bodeo became the service revolver of the Italian Army in 1891. The revolver was named after the head of the Italian commission that recommended its adoption, Carlo Bodeo. It remained the principle handgun of the Italian Army until it was increasingly supplanted by the Glisenti Model 1910. The revolver was never declared obsolete and remained as a reserve weapon until the end of World War II. The Italian manufacturers identified with the production of the Bodeo include: Societa Siderurgica Glisenti, Castelli of Brescia, Metallurgica Bresciana, and Vincenzo Bernardelli of Gardone Val Trompia. During World War I, Spanish manufacturers Errasti and Arrostegui of Eibar produced the Bodeo for the Italian government. The Italians nicknamed this revolver coscia d’agnello ("leg of lamb"). During World War II, the Wehrmacht designated the Bodeo as Revolver 680(i) when utilized as an alternative firearm.

== Design details ==
The Bodeo Model 1889 is a solid-framed, six-shot revolver. The barrel, the cylinder, the trigger components, the loading gate, the ejection rod, the springs and the screws were made in steel; while the frame, the backplate, and the ejection rod collar were made of iron. An external hammer block drop safety was designed and retrofitted to many revolvers in 1894, though this external hammer block safety was replaced with an internal safety during an arsenal refinishing program in 1915. Prior to World War I, the infantry version of the Bodeo was originally produced "in the white". The Italians underwent a program to arsenal refinish many revolvers in 1915, with changes including bluing the revolvers and installation of an internal hammer block drop safety. Later models of the Bodeo were blued from the factory.

== Variations ==
The revolver was designed in two distinct versions: The Type A Enlisted model, with an octagonal-barreled version with a folding trigger; and a Type B officer's model, designed with a trigger guard, Both the Tipo A and Tipo B featured an octagonal-shaped barrel. It is commonly misreported that the Tipo B had a round barrel. The round barrel only appeared on the Alleggerito model that was designed in the 1920’s to reduce the weight of the gun. They were sold to civilians and some police agencies, with very few entering military service. The folding trigger version was produced in greater numbers.

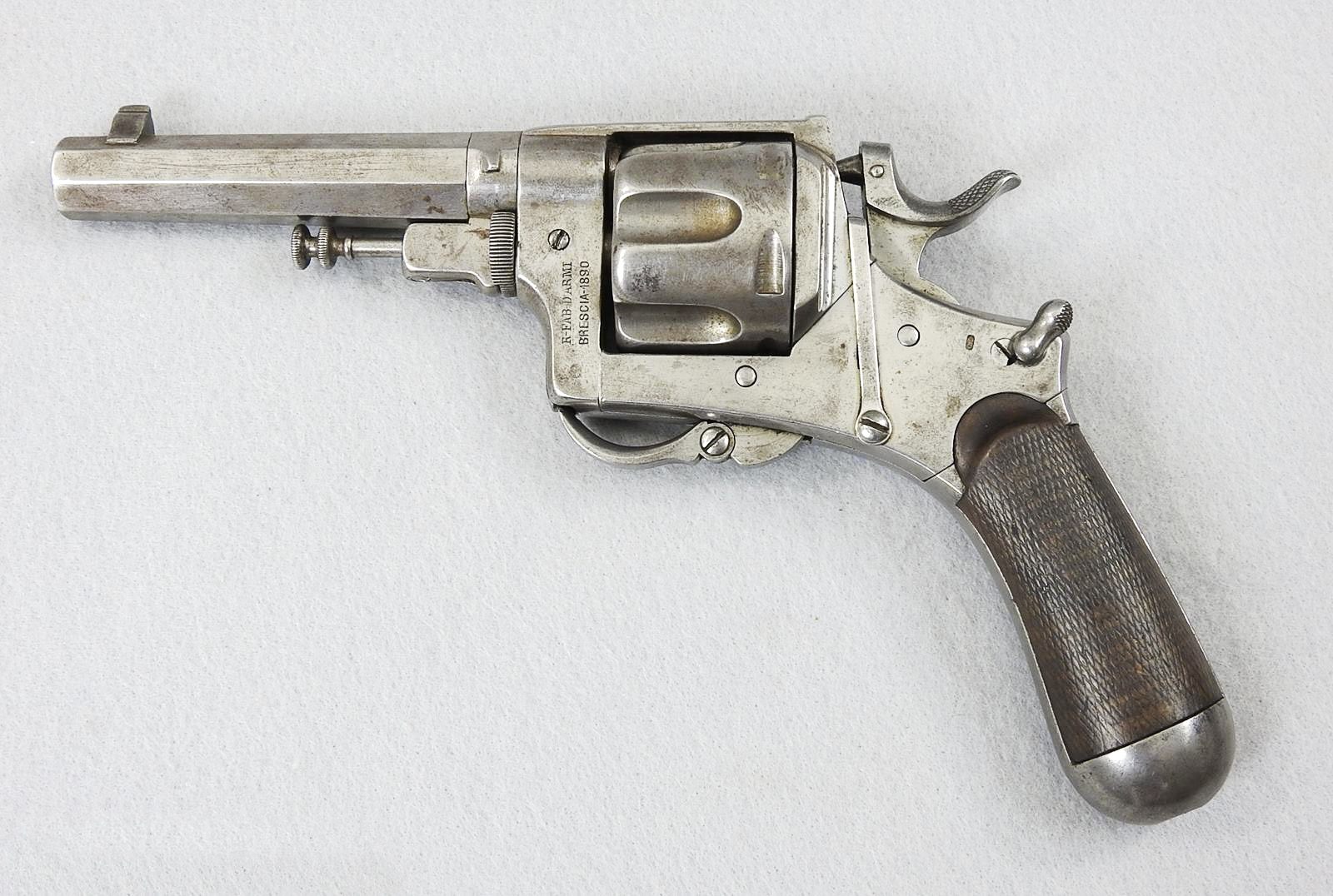
1890 Production Tipo A Bodeo with correct in the white finish and external safety

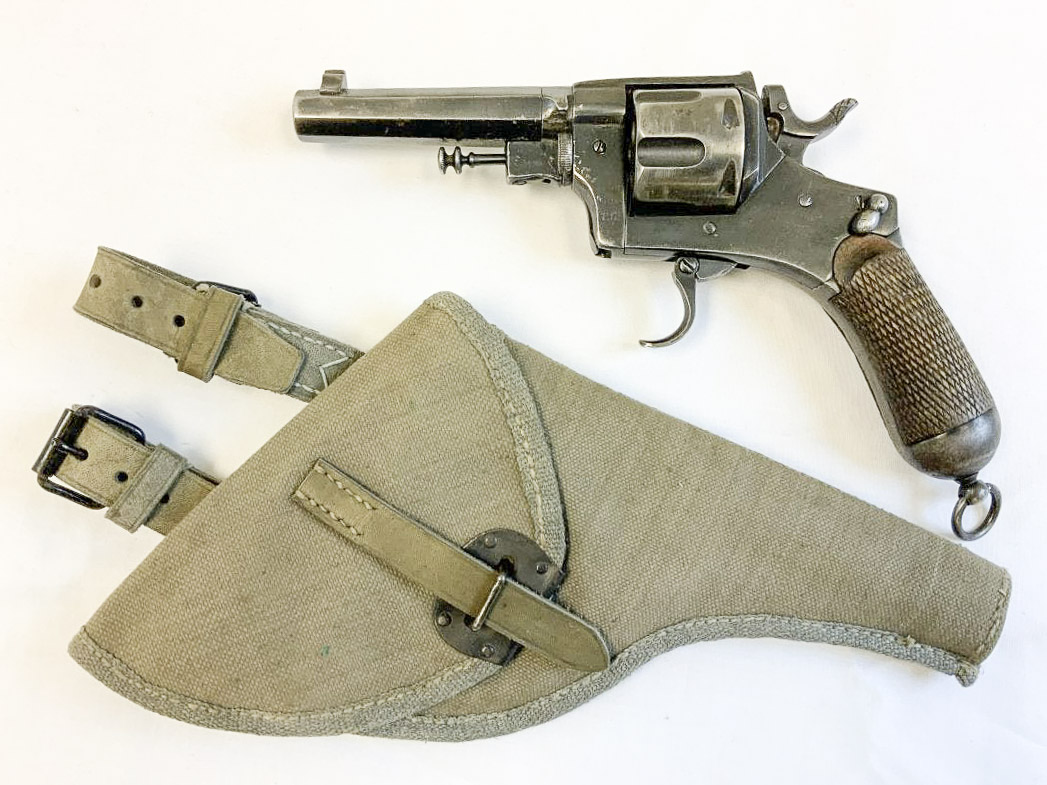
WW1 Production Tipo A Bodeo with internal hammer block safety and blued finish

The Type A Enlisted model has an 4.5" octagonal barrel with a distinctive iconic folding trigger. This variation was first produced by the Royal Arms Factory at Brescia from 1889 to 1891, then, by Glisenti at Brescia from 1891 to 1906. Early production Bodeo revolvers were produced in the white (i.e., unfinished), and will have an external hammer block safety. Production was paused until the Italo-Turkish War in 1911, when production was resumed by Toschi e Castelli. Upon entering World War I in 1915, the Italians contracted with many private producers to produce Bodeo revolvers, including Toschi e Castelli, Mida Gia a Castelli, and Mida Brescia. The Italians also contracted several Spanish firms from Eibar to produce Bodeo Tipo A revolvers during the war. Later Italo-Turkish War and World War I variants of the Tipo A revolver will have an internal hammer block safety. Many early production Bodeo revolvers from pre-war production were arsenal re-blued and retrofitted with the internal hammer safety in 1915 in preparation for Italy's entrance to the war. Production of Tipo A revolvers continued after the war until the late 1920s for a total production of approximately 300,000. All Italian manufactured Tipo A revolvers have a year of manufacture stamped on the left side of the frame, while some Eibar-contracted revolvers lack this year marking.

The Tipo B Revolvers can be distinguished from Tipo A revolvers by the presence of a trigger guard. This variation was manufactured by many firms both before and after World War I, and many Tipo B revolvers were adopted for use by local police forces, as well as the Italian custom's officers.

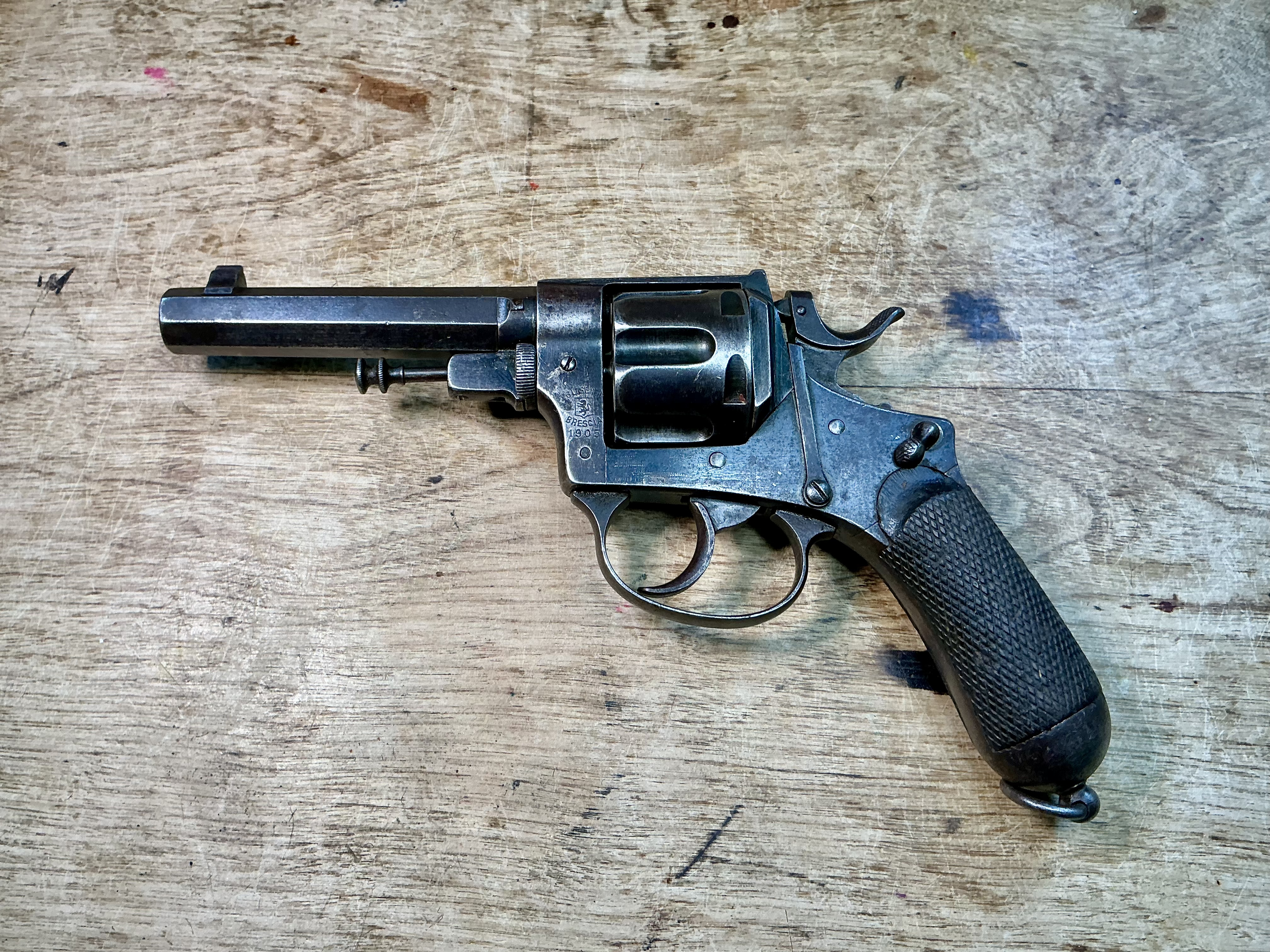
Bodeo Model 1889 Tipo B Revolver

== Mechanics ==
The Bodeo was considered simple and robust. Due to the revolver being produced by a multitude of manufacturers, the quality of the weapon varied greatly, with the early production models made by the Brescia Arsenal and Glisenti Brescia between 1889 and 1906 showing much greater workmanship and quality than wartime production models.

Frames were made from a wide variety of materials ranging from brass to brazed copper plates. The loading gate was connected to the hammer via the Abadie patent with the barrel screwed into the frame. Ejection was achieved by the rod normally housed in the hollow axis pin. The hammer block was designed to prevent firing unless the trigger was fully cocked.

== Users ==
• Kingdom of Italy

• Nazi Germany (Designated as Revolver 680(i).)

• Albanian Kingdom
