= Galil Córdova =

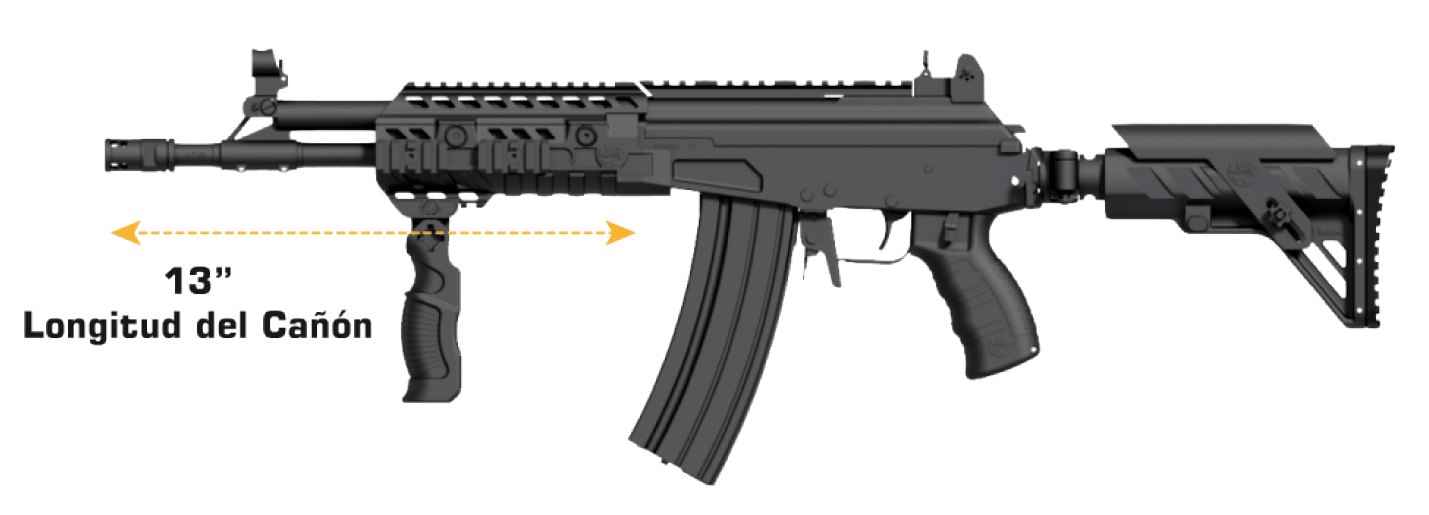
- 13 inch Galil Córdova.
- Type: Assault rifle
- Place of origin: Colombia

Service history
- In service: 2015–present
- Wars: Colombian conflict

Production history
- Designer: Indumil
- Manufacturer: Indumil
- Produced: 2015
- Variants: Córdova 8; Córdova 13; Córdova 18; Galil-C Pistol

Specifications
- Cartridge: 5.56×45mm NATO
- Action: Gas-operated, rotating bolt
- Rate of fire: 650 rounds/min
- Feed system: 35-round Galil box magazine

The Galil Córdova is an assault rifle designed and developed by Colombian company Indumil, based on the Galil AR. It is the main assault rifle of the Colombian Armed Forces and National Police.

The Córdova is named after the Colombian independence hero José María Córdova.

== History ==
With the escalation of the Colombian conflict and the restrictions on the sale of arms and spare parts from manufacturing countries, the government was forced to find a supplier that would satisfy not only the demands of the conflict, but also guarantee the continuous supply of new material, spare parts, but and more importantly, the transfer of technology.

In 1994, Israel sold Galils under license and assembly equipment to the Colombian state company Indumil in 1994.

In 2015, Indumil developed a prototype semi-automatic Galil AR.

In 2020, Indumil reported the sale of 8,000 Córdova under a contract of USD10 million. In 2021, Haiti said that they are looking into potentially purchasing the Córdovas.

== Design ==
A modernization kit of the Galil SAR was produced to improve its current characteristics, allowing the placement of combat accessories (sights, flashlights, laser, foregrip) and improve ergonomics and user comfort through a telescoping stock.

With the conversion kit in place, the need arose to carry out a second update to the weapon, improving some of its technical characteristics (weight, barrel length, caliber, rate of fire and ergonomics), making it also an urban defense tactical rifle adapted to the current security needs of Colombia.

== Variants ==
=== Córdova 8 ===
A version of the Córdova with an 8 inch barrel.

=== Córdova 13 ===
A version of the Córdova with a 13 inch barrel.

=== Córdova 18 ===
A version of the Córdova with an 18 inch barrel.

=== Galil-C Pistol ===
A version of the Córdova with a short barrel and pistol grip with no stock.

== Users ==
- Colombia
- Guatemala: A contract was signed in September 2019 for 8,000 Córdovas for a cost of USD10 million.

=== Potential Users ===
- Haiti: In 2021, Haiti said that there are looking into Colombian-made Córdovas.

== Gallery ==
Córdova 18 inches"

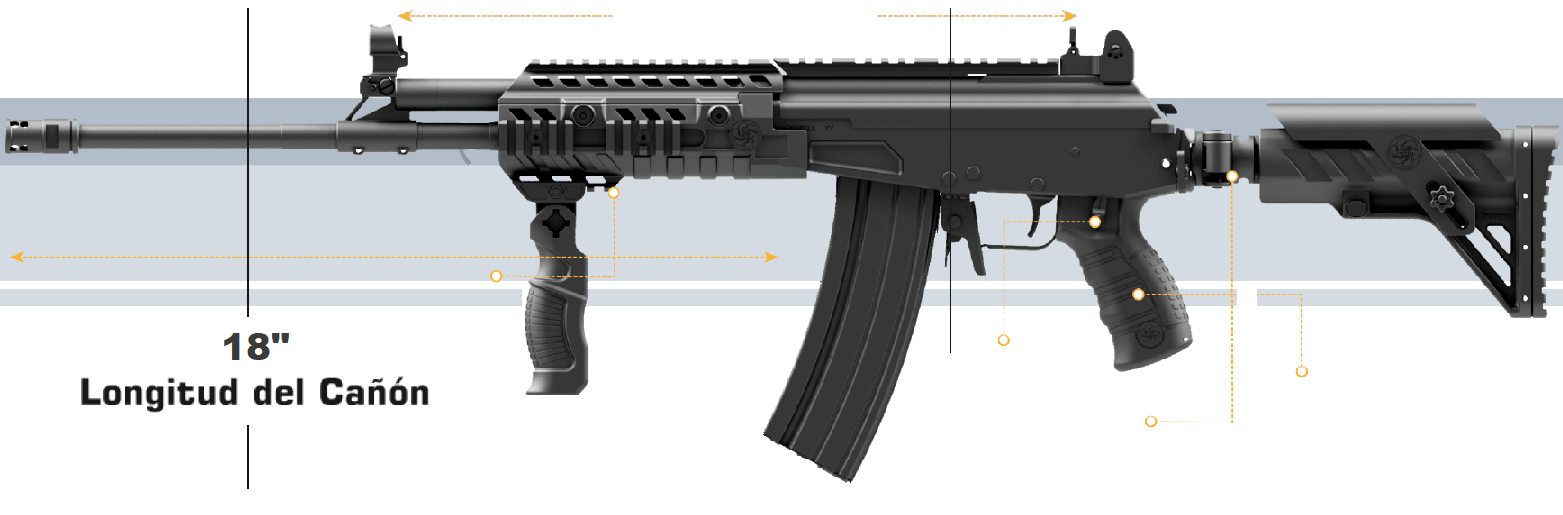
Córdova AR 18"
