= BT/AT 52 =

- Type: Rifle grenade
- Place of origin: Israel

Service history
- Used by: Israeli Defence Force

Production history
- Manufacturer: Israel Military Industries

Specifications
- Mass: 510 g (18 oz)
- Length: 400 mm (16 in)
- Diameter: 50 mm (2.0 in)

The BT/AT 52 is a rifle grenade manufactured by Israeli Military Industries. It is propelled by a bullet trap, and is derived from the earlier MA/AT 52 model.

In Israeli service, it can be fired from either the 7.62 FN FAL or the 5.56 IMI Galil rifle.
