= IWI Galil =

Family of Israeli automatic rifles

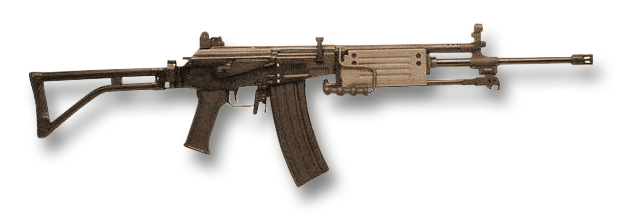
- Galil ARM
- Type: Assault rifle Carbine; Battle rifle
- Place of origin: Israel

Service history
- In service: 1972–present
- Used by: See Users
- Wars: Guatemalan Civil War; Nicaraguan Revolution; Colombian Armed Conflict; Insurgency in the Philippines; Operation Litani; Salvadoran Civil War; 1982 Lebanon War; War in Somalia; Communist insurgency in Thailand; South African Border War; Cenepa War; First Congo War; Congo Civil War; War in Afghanistan; Iraq War; Nepalese Civil War; Central African Republic Civil War; 2025 Cambodian–Thai border crisis

Production history
- Designer: Yisrael Galili; Yakov Lior
- Manufacturer: Manufactured by: Israel Military Industries; Licensed to: Bernardelli; Indumil; Ka Pa Sa State Factories (Myanmar); Denel Land Systems; PLR Systems, India; Z111 Factory (Vietnam)
- Produced: 1972–1998
- Variants: See Variants

Specifications
- Mass: SAR: 3.75 kg (8.27 lb); AR: 3.95 kg (8.7 lb); ARM: 4.35 kg (9.6 lb)
- Length: SAR : 850 mm (33 in) stock extended / 614 mm (24.2 in) stock folded
- Barrel length: SAR: 332 mm (13.1 in); AR, ARM: 460 mm (18.1 in)
- Cartridge: 5.56×45mm NATO; 7.62×51mm NATO; .30 carbine (Magal variant)
- Action: Gas-operated, rotating bolt
- Rate of fire: 650 rounds/min
- Muzzle velocity: SAR: 900 m/s (2,953 ft/s); AR, ARM: 950 m/s (3,116.8 ft/s)
- Effective firing range: 410 meters (Galil ARM)
- Feed system: 5.56×45mm NATO: 35-, 50-, or 65-round detachable box magazine, or 30-round STANAG magazine; 7.62×51mm NATO: 25-round proprietary box magazine; .30 carbine: 15 or 30-round box magazine from the M1 carbine, and or 27-round box magazine (Magal variant)
- Sights: Flip-up rear aperture with protective ears, flip-up tritium night sights, hooded front post

The IWI Galil (Hebrew: גליל) is a family of Israeli-made automatic rifles chambered for the 5.56×45mm NATO and 7.62×51mm NATO cartridges. Originally designed by Yisrael Galili and Yakov Lior in the late 1960s, the Galil was first produced by the state-owned Israel Military Industries and is now exported by the privatized Israel Weapon Industries.

The first Galil rifle was manufactured using RK 62 receivers. Moreover, the Galil design is largely based on the Finnish rifle RK 62 (a derivative of the AK-47).

The Israeli Ground Forces initially deployed the 5.56×45mm NATO Galil in three basic configurations; the automatic rifle machine-gun (ARM), the automatic rifle (AR), and the short automatic rifle (SAR). A modernised, redesigned version of the Galil is produced since 2008, known as the Galil ACE.

== History ==
The Belgian FN FAL battle rifle had initially been adopted by the Israeli Defense Forces in the late 1950s (chambered for the 7.62×51mm cartridge). The FAL had its limitations, a common complaint being that the abundant local sand and dust exposure would cause weapon malfunction (later attributed to lack of stringent maintenance). Overall, however, the FN FAL was considered long and bulky. Its length and malfunctions became such consistent issues that during the 1973 Yom Kippur War some soldiers began arming themselves with the much smaller Uzi.

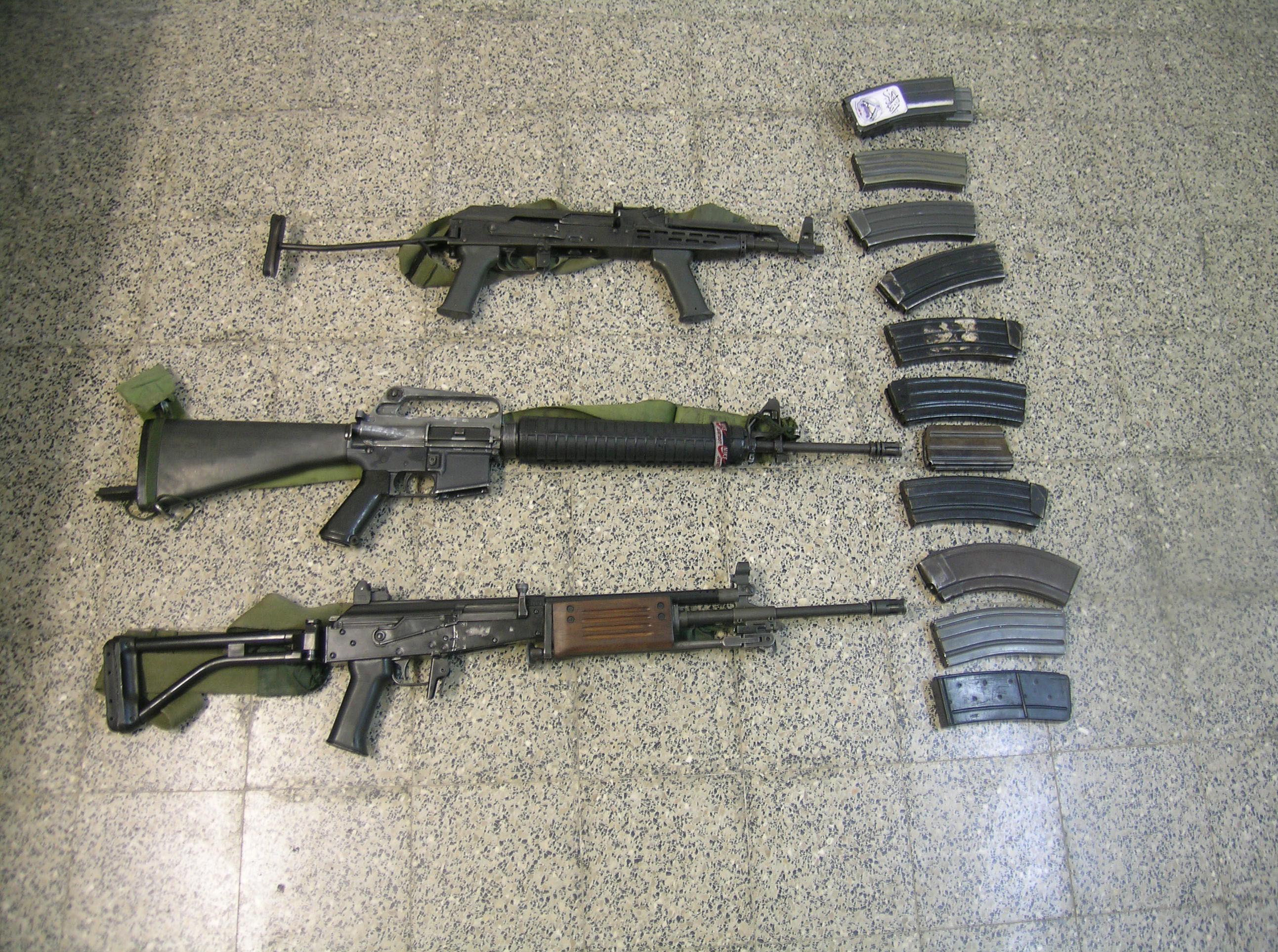
Comparison of the Hungarian AMD-65 (top), the American M16A1 with A2 handguard (middle) and the Israeli Galil ARM (bottom)

During the March 1962 Battle of Nukeib (Operation Swallow), the IDF Golani Brigade captured 11 AK-47 rifles from Syrian forces.

When the IDF began the process of procuring a new, automatic rifle, the AK-47 was considered, but the difficulty of procurement limited its viability. Hence the IDF specifically sought a weapon that would offer the same benefits as AK-47, such as low maintenance requirements, but would also have the accuracy of the M16 and FN FAL. The would-be standard weapon was originally named the Balashnikov, after the weapon's designer Yisrael Galili, whose last name was coincidentally similar to Kalashnikov before he changed it to the more Hebrew sounding Galili. Several weapons were tendered to the Israeli Army, in response to its specifications for a standard-issue assault rifle. These included the M16A1 and Stoner 63 from the US, and the HK33 (West Germany). An indigenous design was offered by Uziel Gal, creator of the Uzi submachine gun. This was found complex and unreliable.

The successful design was offered by Yisrael Galili and Yakov Lior, based on the 7.62×39mm Valmet RK 62, an AK-47 derivative from Finland. (The first Galils were manufactured with Valmet RK 62 receivers.) At the time, the US was replacing European countries (especially France) as Israel's main partner and weapons supplier. Hence, Galil's rifle was chambered for the US 5.56×45mm round (originally the US M193 55-grain version). Tests conducted from the end of the 1960s to the early 1970s led to Galili's rifle emerging as the winner. However, issuance of the Galil was delayed by the sudden onset of the Yom Kippur War in 1973.

The Israeli army first used the 5.56×45mm NATO caliber Galil in three basic configurations:

- The Automatic Rifle Machine-gun (ARM) with bi-pod, wire-cutter and carrying handle; would become the standard service rifle issued to front line infantry troops. Also the version that famously features a bottle opener in the front hand-guard.
- The Automatic Rifle (AR) with no bi-pod, wire-cutter or carrying handle. Issued to support troops and military police units.
- The Short Automatic Rifle (SAR) with shortened barrel. Issued to vehicle crews, army staff and specialty troops.

Although the Galil was the official service rifle of Israel from the mid-1970s to the early 1990s, it was never the principal rifle used (in terms of numbers). Around 1975, 60,000 M16A1s from the U.S. Military Aid Program (MAP) began to arrive in Israel that were quickly integrated into IDF service. The cost of producing the Galil for all IDF forces was very expensive, and Israel continued to purchase M16s and later M4s with military credit from the US, which had replaced many Galils then in service. In general, Israeli troops preferred the M16, because it was lighter and more accurate, if not quite as rugged and reliable. When the M4 came along, this weapon (with its short length and light weight) became even more attractive, along with the M4's versatility in using different optics without losing zeroing when the weapon was disassembled, plus other rail-mounted accessories. The M16 and M4 also proved to be better suited to the grenade launching role, using the US M203 integrated 40mm launcher. Israeli paratroops in particular preferred the M4 carbine to the Galil, while the M16 was retained for training recruits, reservists, Artillery Corps, and the Armored Corps (Heil HaShiryon).

By 2000, both the Galil ARM and AR variants were phased out from standard issue and replaced by M4 and M16 variants. The Galil SAR (G'lilon) was kept in use by some rear-line services, including the Knesset Guard and the Artillery and Armored Corps, until around 2004.

For a short time, the Galil was licensed by NWM (Nederlandsche Wapen-en Munitiefabriek) De Kruithoorn N.V. for sales to a NATO country.

Currently they are only manufactured in Colombia by Indumil, alongside the Galil Ace and the Galil Córdova, the latter of which was designed by Indumil.

400 Galil rifles were purchased through the Antiguan government for the Medelin cartel.

== Design details ==
=== Operating mechanism ===
The Galil series of rifles are selective fire weapons operated by a Kalashnikov-pattern gas-driven long-stroke piston system with no regulator. The weapon is locked with a rotary bolt with two locking lugs that lock into recesses milled into the receiver.

When fired, a portion of the propellant gases are evacuated into the gas cylinder through a 1.8 mm (0.07 in) port, drilled at a 30° angle in the barrel, and a channel in the gas block. The high-pressure gases drive the piston rod (which is attached to the bolt carrier) rearward. During this rearward movement, a cam slot machined into the bolt carrier engages a cam pin on the bolt and rotates the bolt, unlocking the action. The arrangement of parts on the bolt carrier assembly provides for a degree of free travel, allowing gas pressure in the barrel to drop to a safe level before unlocking. To the immediate rear of the chrome-plated piston head is a notched ring which provides a reduced bearing surface and alleviates excess gas build-up. As the bolt carrier travels back, it compresses the return spring guided in a hollowed section of the bolt carrier and the return energy contained in the spring drives the moving assembly back forward, stripping a new round from the magazine and locking the action. The cocking handle is attached to the bolt carrier on the right side of the receiver and reciprocates with each shot; the handle is bent upwards allowing for operation with the left hand while the shooting hand remains on the pistol grip.

The ejection of spent cases from the Galil is sometimes a violent action. Cases can be dented by the ejector and be thrown as much as 40 ft away from the rifle in some cases, depending on position.

=== Features ===
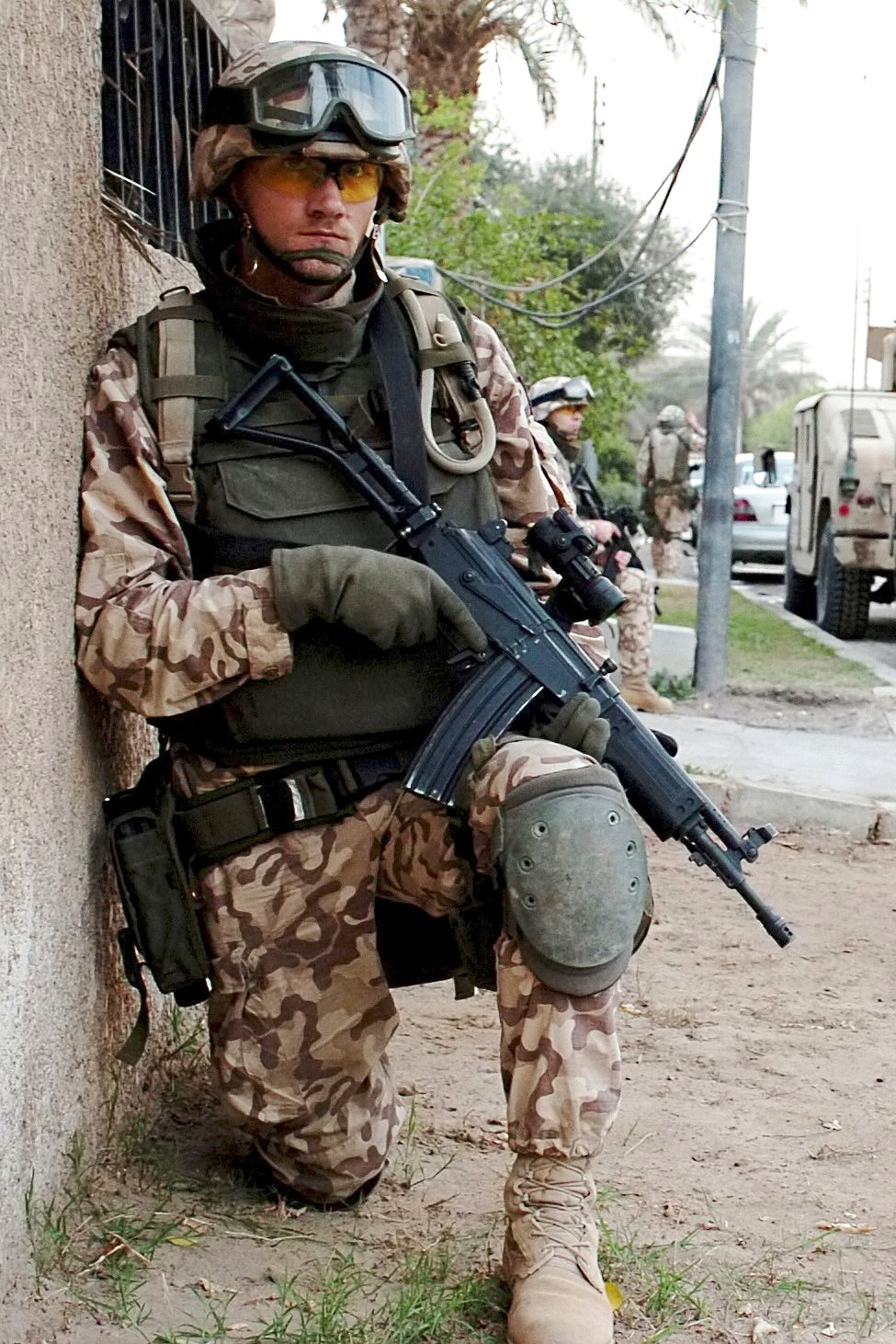
An Estonian soldier on patrol in March 2005, during the Iraq War, with a compact Galil SAR in 5.56×45mm.

The Galil is hammer-fired and has a trigger mechanism patterned after the trigger used in the American M1 Garand. The rifle's fire selector switch has three positions: S-A-R. The standard AK-47 style selector is retained on the right face of the receiver, and a dual thumb-selector is present on the left face above the pistol grip for easier manipulation. Pushing the left-selector to the rear position "R" (British terminology for "repetition"), provides semi-automatic fire. Pushing it to the middle position "A" produces fully automatic fire. Pushing the lever fully forward to "S" will activate the safety. Some models use a reverse-linkage RAS mechanism that performs the opposite action; pushing forward sets the rifle to Repetition or Automatic, and pulling rearward engages the safety,

The Galil prototypes used a stamped and riveted sheet metal steel receiver, but due to the higher operating pressures of the 5.56×45mm cartridge, this solution was discarded and the designers turned to a heavy milled forging. As a testament to its heritage, early prototypes were fabricated using Valmet Rk 62 receivers manufactured in Finland. All exterior metal surfaces are phosphated for corrosion resistance and then coated with a black enamel (except for the barrel, gas block, and front sight tower). The machined solid steel billet action avoided cracking problems the AK-series had with steel stamped sheet actions, but this made the Galil heavier.

The Gas-Block, handguard retainers and folding-stock mechanism components are cast pieces that are finish-machined and accordingly fitted. The sighting arrangements are also entirely cast and machined for greater durability. The only stamped components on the Galil are the magazine-catch, trigger guard, dust cover (on the R5 and R6 the rear handguard-retainer is stamped versus cast) and the magazines.

The weapon is fitted with a high-impact plastic handguard and pistol grip and a side-folding (folds to the right side) tubular steel skeleton stock. The rifle can be used with a sound suppressor. The weapon features a bottle opener in the front handguard and wire cutter built into the bipod. The bottle opener feature was included to prevent damage to magazines being used to open bottles, due to the large civilian reservist components of the IDF. Use of magazines to open bottles was a common source of magazine lip damage with Uzi submachine guns. Wire cutters were included to reduce the time necessary for IDF troops to cut down wire fences common to rural areas in Israel.

=== Barrel ===
Early production models were supplied with barrels that had six right-hand grooves and a 305mm (1:12 in) rifling twist (optimized for use with M193 ammunition), while recent production models feature a 178mm (1:7 in) twist barrel with six right-hand grooves (used to stabilize the heavier SS109/M855 projectile). The barrel has a slotted flash suppressor with 6 ports and can be used to launch rifle grenades (such as the BT/AT 52) or mount a bayonet lug attachment (it will accept the M7 bayonet).

=== Feeding ===
The Galil is fed from a curved, steel box magazine with a 35-round capacity (SAR and AR versions), a 50-round capacity (ARM model) or a special color-coded 12-round magazine blocked for use exclusively with ballistite (blank) cartridges, used to launch rifle grenades. The magazine is inserted front end first in a similar manner to the AK family. An optional magazine adaptor enables the use of M16 type STANAG magazines. Some who have used the Galil ARM with the 50-round magazine have noted that it is difficult to engage targets at elevated heights while firing on the ground in the prone position due to the magazine's extended length.

=== Sights ===
The L-shaped rear sight has two apertures preset for firing at 0–300 m and 300–500 m respectively (the rear sight can only be adjusted for elevation). The front post is fully adjustable for both windage and elevation zero and is enclosed in a protective hood. Low-light flip-up front blade and rear sight elements have three self-luminous tritium capsules (betalights) which are calibrated for 100 m when deployed. When the rear night sight is flipped up for use, the rear aperture sights must be placed in an offset position intermediate between the two apertures. Certain variants have a receiver-mounted dovetail adapter that is used to mount various optical sights.

=== Stock ===
The standard stock found on the Galil is a rough-copy of the FN-FAL Paratrooper stock, with modifications for simpler production and ease of use. Unlike the FAL folding stock, the Galil uses no locking button and is operated entirely by a pin and spring pivoting mechanism; to fold the stock, the "L" bracket on the stock portion is pressed down to where the spring is fully compressed and the entire stock is allowed to pivot on the buttstock hinge. The same operation is done for unfolding to the stock to the open-position.

The bracket and knuckle assemblies feature camming surfaces that allow the emergency unfolding of the stock by simply pulling the buttstock rearwards, however this should generally be avoided as it will wear down the mechanism rapidly over time, and lead to the stock wobbling in both positions.

There were six different types of Galil folding stock (not including the Micro or Galatz models) that were utilized over time on the Galil and R4 series of weapons. Wooden AK47 type buttstocks were also offered by request, although none are known to have been used by any militaries and were mostly relegated to the civilian market.

Contrary to popular belief, all Galil folding stocks are made of tubular aluminum like its FAL rendition; steel was never used, as it would have added too much additional weight, and the aluminum stocks were more than durable for standard firing and rifle-grenade usage.

== Variants ==
=== Galil AR ===
This variant is the standard rifle version, fitted with a high-impact plastic handguard and pistol grip, a side-folding tubular metal skeleton stock that folds to the right side (fitted to all variants except the Galil Sniper). The 5.56mm NATO version uses a 35-round magazine and a has a 460 mm (18.1 in) barrel, while the 7.62mm NATO version uses a 25-round magazine and has a 535 mm (21.1 in) barrel.

=== Galil SAR ===
This variant (aka: G'lilon) is configured with a shorter barrel. Due to having a shorter barrel, a corresponding shorter piston and gas tube as well as a unique gas block are also found on the SAR. The SAR variant saw the longest service life in the IDF, being used with the Armored Corps until 2005. The 5.56mm NATO version uses a 35-round magazine and a has a 332 mm (13.1 in) barrel. While the 7.62mm NATO version uses a 25-round magazine and has a 400 mm (15.7 in) barrel.

=== Galil ARM ===
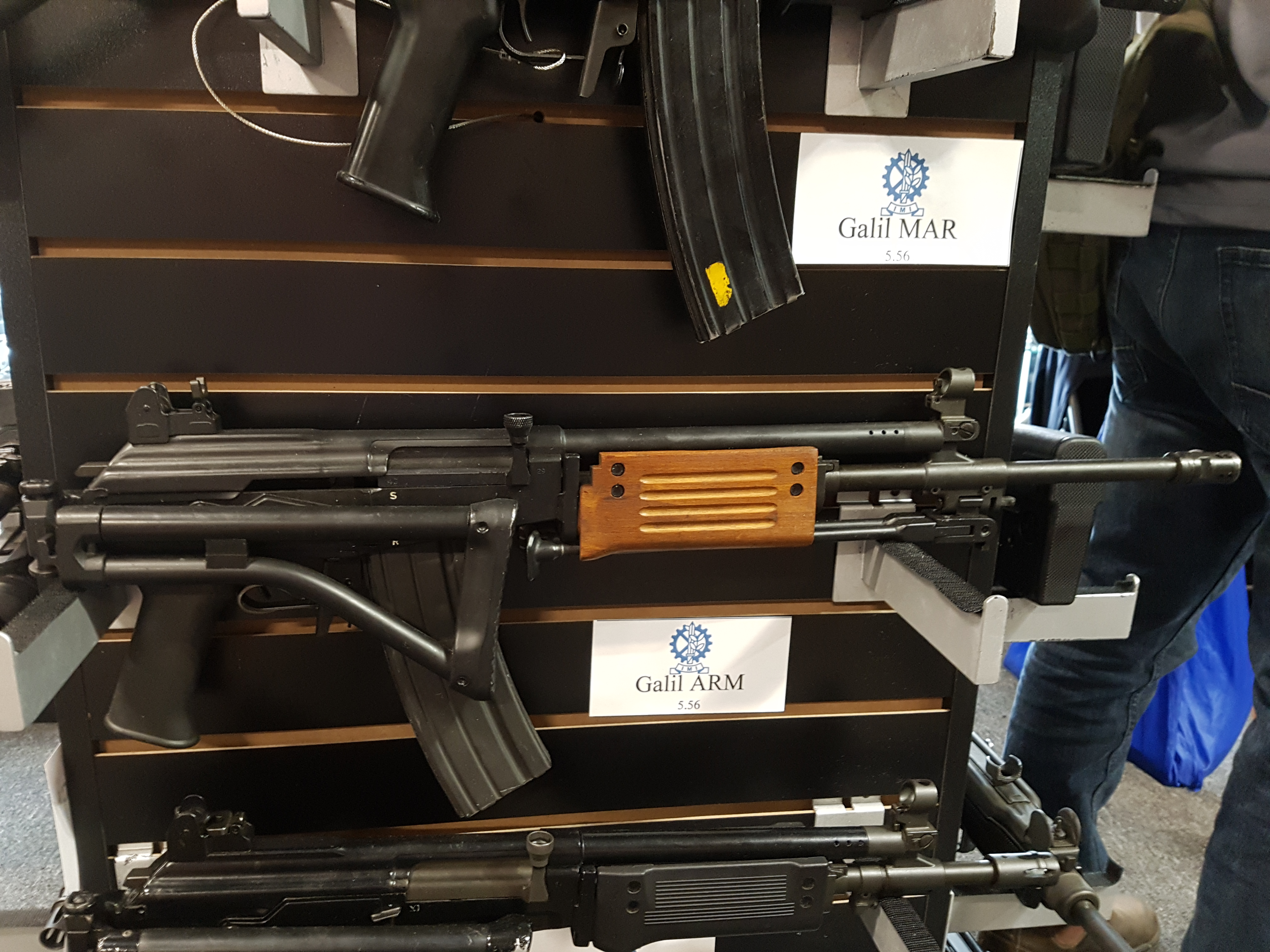
Galil ARM 5.56mm with 35-round magazine

This variant is additionally equipped with a carrying handle, folding bipod and a larger wooden handguard. The wooden handguard remains cooler in temperature during sustained automatic fire, and also has grooves for bipod storage. When folded, the bipod's legs form a speed chute for rapid magazine insertion; the bipod will form a wire cutter and the rear handguard ferrule, which retains the bipod legs, can be used to open bottles by design (in order to prevent soldiers using magazine lips for this purpose, which damaged them). The 5.56mm NATO version uses a 35-round magazine and a has a 460 mm (18.1 in) barrel, while the 7.62mm NATO version uses a 25-round magazine and has a 535 mm (21.1 in) barrel.

=== Micro Galil ===
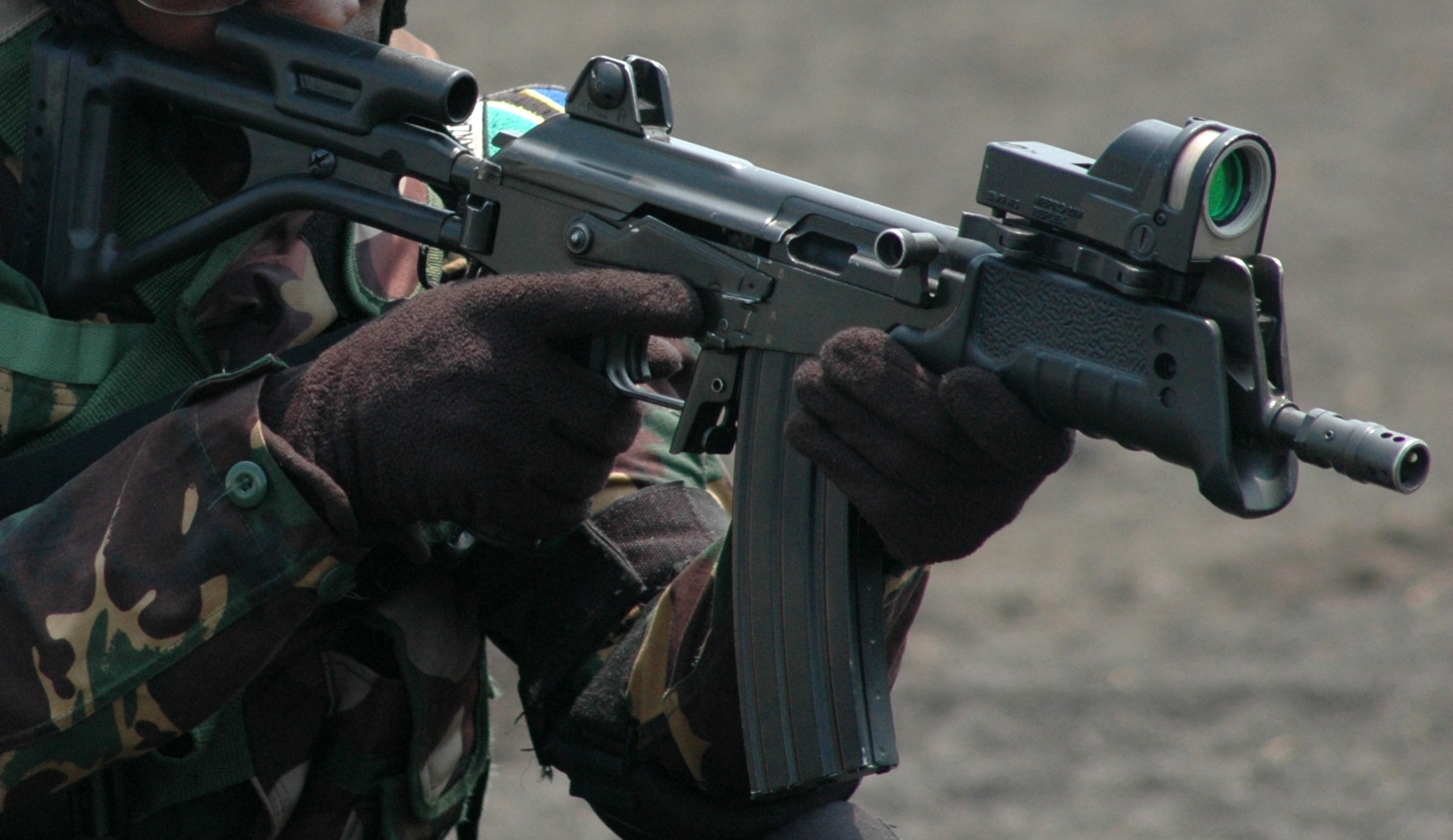
IMI Galil MAR (Micro Assault Rifle) used by Tanzanian soldier.

The most recent addition to the Galil family of weapons is the MAR compact carbine, which retains the internal features of the original Galil with a completely new frame, operating system and an even shorter barrel. Introduced to the public at the second International Defence Industry Exhibition in Poland in 1994, the weapon was developed for use with the army and police special units, vehicle crews, army staff, special operations personnel and airborne infantry.

The MAR, or the Micro Galil, is a reduced-size version of the Galil SAR (706 mm stock extended / 465 mm folded), weighing 2.98 kg (6.57 pounds) empty. Compared to the original carbine, the MAR has a shortened barrel 210 mm (8.3 in), receiver, piston, gas tube and foregrip. The firearm is fed from a 35-round steel magazine which can be clipped together to increase reload speed. The MAR has a cyclic rate of fire of around 650–750 RPM (rounds per minute), which is a bit higher than the full sized rifles. An optional magazine adapter inserted inside the magazine well allows the use of standard 20- and 30-round M16 magazines. The lever safety and fire selector (located on both sides of the receiver) has four settings: "S"—weapon is safe, "A"—automatic fire, "B"—3-round burst, "R"—semi-automatic mode. The barrel has a multifunction muzzle device. The MAR is equipped with a folding tubular aluminum stock and a flip aperture sight with two settings: 0–300 m and beyond 300 m. The MAR can also be equipped with a night vision device (attached through an adapter mounted to the left side of the receiver), a daytime optical sight (mounted via a receiver cover adapter), low-light sights with tritium illuminated dots, a vertical forward grip with integrated laser pointer, silencer, and a nylon sling. Upon request, the weapon can be supplied with a bolt catch, plastic magazines weighing 0.164 kg, or an enlarged trigger guard for use with gloves.

The MAR has undergone several changes over time, and it is worth noting that it may also be found with a polymer-coated aluminum stock or an all-polymer stock. The Model 699 is available with a 267mm barrel and optional left-side charging handle which is welded onto the left side of the bolt carrier and protrudes through a slot cut in the receiver cover that is covered by a spring-loaded cover while the bolt carrier is forward.

=== Galil Sniper ===
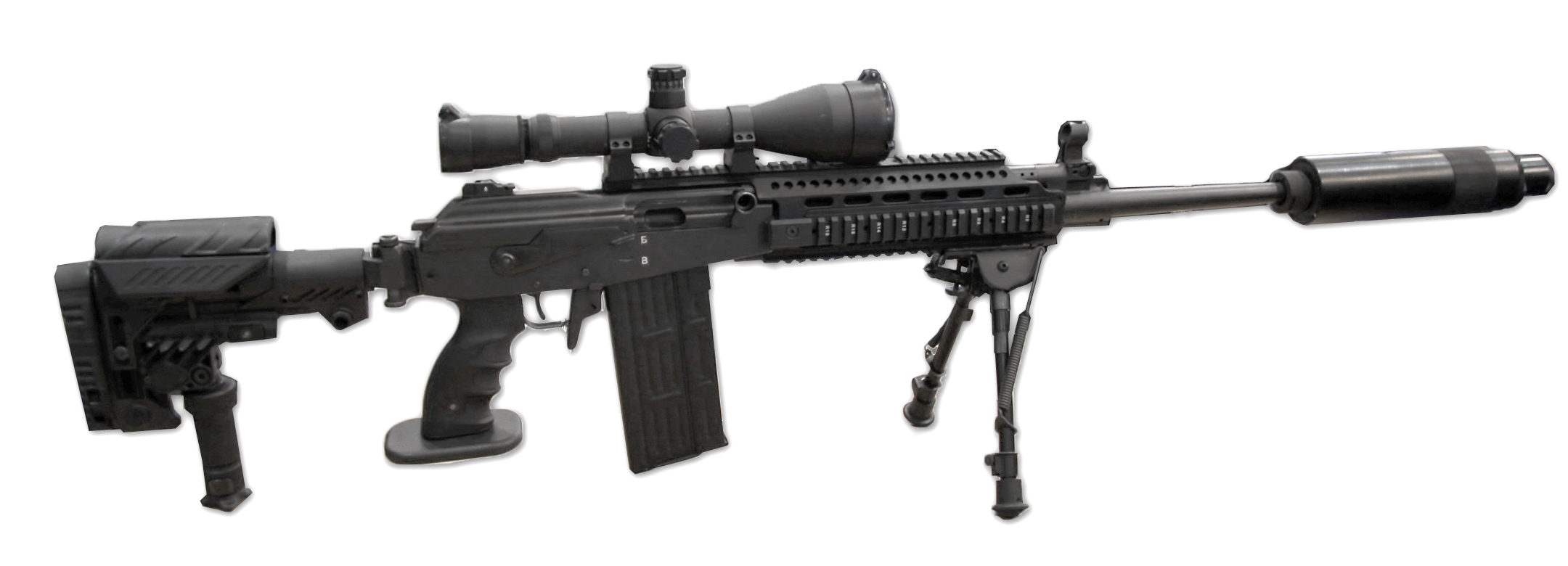
IWI Galil Sniper (Galatz) semi-automatic sniper rifle.

The 7.62mm Galil Sniper (aka: Galil Tzalafim or "Galatz") is a derivative of the ARM that is used in conjunction with high-quality 7.62×51mm NATO ammunition for consistent accuracy.

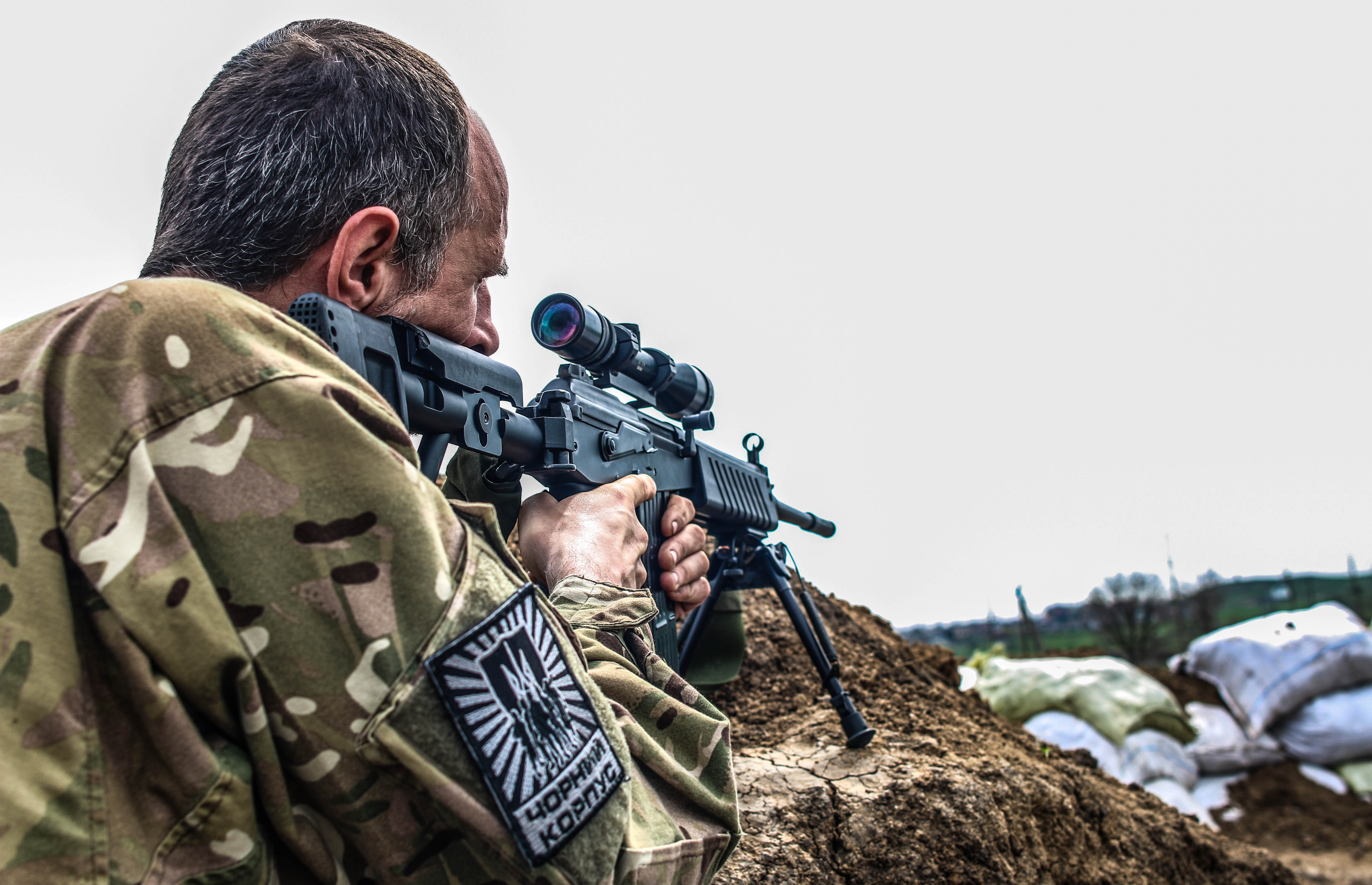
Ukrainian Azov Battalion marksman with a Galatz rifle

The precision rifle is a semi-automatic-only rifle with a similar operating system to other Galil variants, but optimised for accuracy. The rifle is fed from a proprietary 25-round box magazine. It uses a heavy-profile match barrel that is heavier than that used on other variants. It is fitted with a multi-functional muzzle device, which acts as both a flash suppressor and a muzzle brake. It can be replaced with a sound suppressor, which requires the use of subsonic ammunition for maximum effectiveness.

The weapon was modified with a two-stage trigger mechanism with an adjustable pull force, a wooden buttstock that folds to the right side of the weapon and a heavy-duty bipod, mounted to the forward base of the receiver housing that folds beneath the handguard when not in use. The buttstock is fully adjustable in length and height and features a variable-height cheek riser. The rifle comes with mechanical iron sights and an adapter used to mount a telescopic day sight (Nimrod 6×40) or a night sight. The mount is quick-detachable and capable of retaining zero after remounting. The precision rifle is stored in a rugged transport case that comes with an optical sight, mount, filters, two slings (for carrying and firing), and a cleaning kit. Recent production models feature synthetic plastic furniture and a skeletonized metal stock.

The Galatz was first introduced in 1983. The SR-99 is a modernized version of the Galatz featuring an adjustable skeleton stock instead of a wooden stock, synthetic handguard, and a synthetic pistol grip. It is somewhat less rugged but more ergonomic.

The Galatz is made under license by Punj Lloyd Raksha Systems and the Z111 Factory in Vietnam.

=== Other variants ===
- Magal: A law enforcement carbine variant of the Galil MAR chambered in .30 carbine. It uses the same 15- and 30-round magazines as the M1 carbine, as well as a dedicated 27-round magazine incorporating a bolt hold-open device. First issued in 1999, the MAGAL was withdrawn from service in 2001 after numerous complaints of malfunctions.
- Marksman Assault Rifle Mark 1: 5.56mm designated marksman rifle introduced in 1996. Has a scope and padded stock.
- Golani: A civilian version with a new-production milled semi-automatic receiver and barrel built in the United States. All other components are original IMI Galil production parts.
- Galil ACE: The new generation of the Galil rifle, utilizing a left-side-mounted charging handle, a spring-loaded dust cover, and a plastic or polymer lower receiver designed to lower cost and weight. The ACE has been produced in three versions (Micro, SAR and AR) chambered for 5.56mm NATO, 5.45×39mm, 7.62mm Soviet M43 and 7.62mm NATO. All variants have up to five picatinny rails for mounting optical devices and accessories. It can be stripped without any tools.

=== Foreign variants ===
==== Italian variants ====
The Italian firearms manufacturing firm Vincenzo Bernardelli manufactured under license quantities of the Galil assault rifle in two different models for governmental use in the 1980s. The Bernardelli Mod.377 VB-STD assault rifle was an outright clone of the Galil AR/ARM variant.

The Bernardelli Mod.378 VB-SR assault carbine was a modified clone of the Galil SAR with a different magazine well that accepted STANAG magazines, much similar in concept and look to the above-mentioned optional magazine adapter currently available for the Israeli-made models, except that the Bernardelli VB-SR could be manufactured with permanent STANAG magazine well modification on demand. The rifles competed to the trial for the adoption of a new 5.56×45mm NATO caliber rifle, but lost to the Beretta 70/90 assault weapons system.

Both rifles have the A-R-S trigger group (S-E-F; Safe, Semi-Auto, Full-Auto). The STD can be adapted to mount the M203.

The VB-SR's parts can be changed with the R5 and the Galil SAR.

==== Vietnamese variants ====
The SBT-7.62VN (Note: Some sources state that its actual name is the SBT7MK4.) is a clone of the Galatz, having a M-LOK handguard with an adjustable stock. It was shown to the public in 2024.

== Users ==
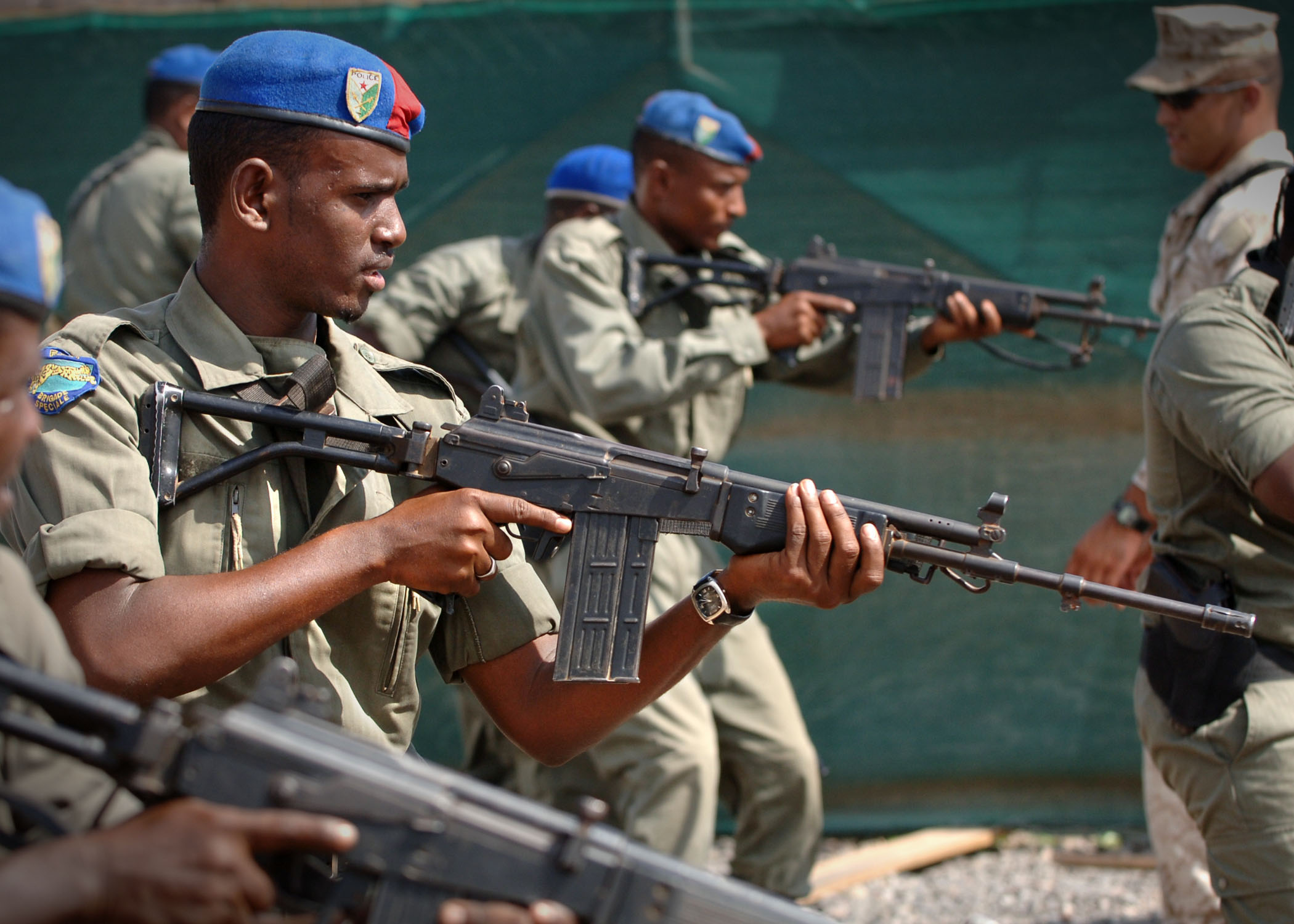
Djiboutian National Police officers training with the 7.62mm Galil AR.

- Bolivia
- Botswana
- Brazil: The Polícia Militar do Estado do Pará (PMPA; Military State Police of Pará) ordered 555 Magal carbines in 2001.
- Cameroon: Issued to presidential guard units and the BIR.
- Central African Republic
- Chad: Delivered in 2006.
- Chile Currently the ARM and SAR variants still on duty with the Chilean Air Force. ACE N22 variants adopted by the Chilean Army since 2014.
- Colombia: Standard issue rifle. Produced under license by Indumil. Also adopted the Galil ACE rifle by the middle of 2010, produced by Indumil. FARC rebels use captured examples against the Colombian armed forces.
- Republic of Congo: delivered in 1994.
- Costa Rica
- Democratic Republic of Congo
- Djibouti
- El Salvador
- Estonia: Uses 5.56mm versions of the Galil AR, SAR, ARM, and the 7.62mm Galil Sniper. In 2008, most Galils in service were given upgrades.
- Eswatini
- Equatorial Guinea
- Fiji
- Georgia: Uses GALATZ sniper and Micro-Galil assault rifles.
- Guatemala: 15,000 Galils.
- Haiti
- India: 200 Galil Snipers bought in 2002.
- Indonesia: Komando Pasukan Katak (Kopaska) tactical diver group and Komando Pasukan Khusus (Kopassus) special forces group.
- Italy: As of 2009, the Bernardelli Mod.377 VB-STD and the Bernardelli Mod.378 VB-SR are in the inventories of the Italian National Police, and are known to be deployed with the NOCS team.
- Kenya: Galil Sniper rifle.
- Kosovo: Kosovo Security Forces.
- Lesotho
- Mexico: Secretaría de Seguridad Pública.
- Montenegro: The Galil sniper used by the Montenegrin Special Police Unit.
- Myanmar: Made with assistance from Israeli weapon specialists as the MA series.
- Nepal: 2,000 Galils, used by Special forces and Ranger battalion.
- Nicaragua
- Papua New Guinea: Galil sniper variant.
- Paraguay: Indumil-made Galils for the Fuerzas de Operaciones de Policias Especiales (Special Police Operations Forces), SENAD (Drug Enforcement), and main rifle of the Paraguayan Police.
- Peru
- Philippines: Philippine National Police-PNP Mobile Forces. Special Action Force.
- Rwanda
- Sierra Leone: 112+ Galil AR acquired by the Sierra Leone Police.
- Senegal: Galil sniper used by special forces.
- South Africa: Standard assault rifle of the South African National Defence Force. Produced under license in a modified form as the R4 by Denel Land Systems.
- Tanzania: Galil MAR version seen in use by Tanzanian special forces in the Congo.
- Thailand: Used in small numbers in Department of Corrections.
- Trinidad and Tobago
- Tonga: Donated by Israel.
- Uganda: Used by the Chieftaincy of Military Intelligence (CMI), and by the Presidential Guard Brigade (PGB), a division of the Special Forces Command (SFC), all within the Uganda People's Defence Force (UPDF).
- United States: Ventura County Sheriff's Department.
- Ukraine: Galil Sniper produced under license as Fort-301.
- Vietnam: Uses Galil ACE and Galil Sniper.

=== Former users ===
- Panama: Reportedly used by the defunct Panama Defense Forces 'UESAT' Anti-terrorism unit.
- Portugal: 5.56mm AR and ARM versions were used by the Portuguese Army airborne infantry until 2019, when was replaced by FN SCAR.
- Syrian National Coalition

=== Non-state actors ===
- United States: Rajneeshpuram Peace Force.
