= INDUMIL Córdova =

Semi-automatic handgun

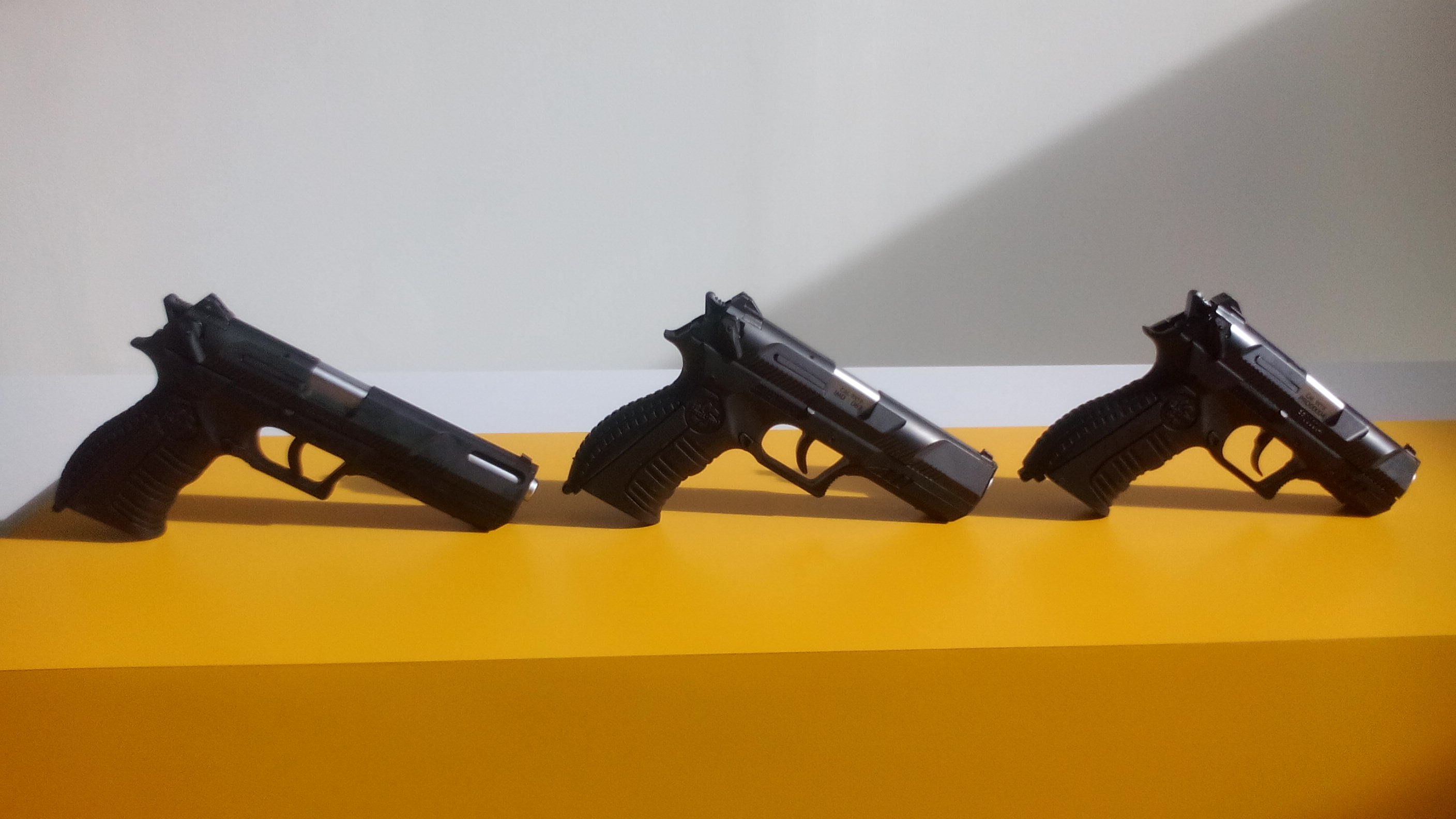
- three types of Cordova pistols: Tactical, Standard, and Compact
- Type: Semi-automatic pistol
- Place of origin: Colombia

Service history
- In service: 2013–present

Production history
- Designer: INDUMIL
- Designed: 2010
- Manufacturer: INDUMIL
- Variants: Córdova Compacta; Córdova Táctica

Specifications
- Cartridge: 9×19mm Parabellum
- Action: Short recoil operated
- Feed system: Detachable box magazine
- Sights: Rear sight and sight (for combat). Backlit for night operations.; Optional: Tritium scope

The INDUMIL Córdova is a semi-automatic pistol developed by INDUMIL. Made of a fiberglass reinforced polymer, the locked breech system operates by mass recoil. It is the first commercial pistol to have a receiver system with the fire control system. It is initially designed for government agencies and the Military Forces of Colombia; the Córdova became available in late 2015 for the civilian commercial market. Its objective is to make the country self-sufficient in the field of weapons for personal use and carry, and thus replace the importation of this type of weapons.

== History ==
In early 2014, the first commercial production of 500 units was carried out exclusively for the Ministry of National Defense, planning its export in that year. The tests were positive and the pistol began its commercialization in the Colombian private market, being able to be acquired by some active military, others in retirement, as well as personnel of security companies.

After these particular users started using it, they found some faults, especially in the ammunition feed. They all believed they were bugs in their own gun. In December 2014, an experienced firearms aficionado made a YouTube video demonstrating the gun's flaws, unofficially calling it "Generation 1." After this, the José María Córdova Factory assumed the titanic task of collecting all the pistols that had been sold up to that moment with the purpose of correcting the errors that had been detected.

Taking advantage of the fact that the pistols were collected, at the factory, the spaces were in the frame, the chamber was reinforced (replacing the barrel as well), and safety locks were adjusted, softening the recovery spring and opting to use 100% metal magazines, instead of those made of polymer;, slide weight was also lowered. Hence there is talk of the "evolution" of the weapon.

Production of the Córdova stopped completely because the factory focused solely on correcting the flaws in the pistols they had produced to date. By May 2015, 75% of the pistols on the market had been corrected, and the same firearms enthusiast made a new YouTube video demonstrating the new corrected Córdova pistol, unofficially calling it the "Generation 2". By August 2015, 99% of the pistols were ready, with commercial production starting again in September of the same year.

In June 2016 a definitive version of the pistol is released, and the same firearms enthusiast made a new YouTube video demonstrating the new final Córdova pistol, unofficially calling it the "Generation 3".

== Users ==
- Colombia
