= INDUMIL =

Colombian state-owned weapons manufacturing company

Military Industry of Colombia
- Native name: Spanish: Industria Militar de Colombia
- Type: State-owned enterprise
- Industry: Defense
- Predecessor: Taller Nacional de Artes Mecanicas
- Founded: 1954; 72 years ago
- Headquarters: Bogotá, Colombia
- Area served: Americas
- Key people: Gustavo Matamoros Camacho (General manager)
- Products: Munitions, Firearms, Artillery, Explosives, Clothing, Entrenching tools
- Number of employees: 602
- Website: www.indumil.gov.co

INDUMIL (a portmanteau of the Spanish words Industria Militar, Military Industry) is a Colombian-based military weapons manufacturer. The company is run by the Colombian government.

== History ==
Indumil was originally known as National Workshop of Mechanic Crafts (Spanish: Taller Nacional de Artes Mecánicas). It was founded in 1908 as a dependency of the Ministry of War. The institution was renamed Indumil in 1954 as an autonomous organisation.

In 1954 Indumil's main facilities were opened. Its first factory, named General José María Córdova, was intended to produce small arms and ammunition. This facility is located in Soacha, Cundinamarca. In 1955 a second facility was set up under the name of Santa Bárbara. This second unit makes heavy munitions and artillery equipment for Colombian military forces.

In 1964 an explosives factory under the name Antonio Ricaurte was inaugurated. In 1968 this facility became an integral part of Indumil. In 1975, documentation from Heckler & Koch mentioned that the company was allowed to produce the G3, MP5 and the HK21 under license.

During the 1980s and 1990s the Colombian government started a commercial relationship with Israeli Military Industries. Through a staged process Indumil developed licensed production of IMI Galil rifles for the use of the Colombian military.

In 2000 Indumil was granted a certification ISO 9002/94. During the new millennium Indumil received a number of awards as a defense industry.

== Products ==
List of products:

=== Rifles ===
- Galil AR & SAR
- Galil ACE 21, 22 and 23
- Galil Córdova
- Jaguar (formerly Miranda)

=== Handguns ===
- Beretta 92FS
- Berreta APX & Centurión
- CZ P-07 & 10C
- Walther P22
- Jericho 941 PSL, PL and FBL
- MASADA
- M&P 2.0
- Córdova
- Glock 17, 19, 26, 43, & 44
- Llama Revolver models Cassidy, Scorpion and Martial

=== Shotguns ===
- Mossberg Maverick
- Hatsan Arms shotgun.

=== Ammunition ===
- 5.56×45mm NATO SS109
- 7.62×51mm NATO M80
- .38 Special
- .32 Long Colt
- 9×19mm
- 7.65×21mm
- 12 gauge
- 16 gauge
- 20 gauge

The 5.56×45mm and 7.62×51mm are also produced in all their variations such as tracer and blank cartridges.

=== Explosives ===
- M26 grenade H.E
- 40mm H.E - AP grenade.
- IM 60 mm H.E. mortar shell.
- IM 81 mm H.E. mortar shell.
- IM 120 mm H.E. mortar shell.
- IM 125 lb PG aerial bomb.
- IM 250 lb PG aerial bomb.
- IM 500 lb PG aerial bomb.
- 50g - 11 kg Satchel charge

All mortar shells, grenades and aerial bombs are also produced in variations made for training.

=== Miscellaneous ===
- MGL Grenade Launcher
- IMC-40 grenade launcher

Indumil's flagship small firearm is the Llama revolver. It is a 6 to 10 shot capacity, caliber .38 Special revolver, which is produced mainly at the General José María Córdova factory.

Indumil is one of two companies that produce the IMI Galil rifles outside Israel, the other being Denel of South Africa. After two decades of stage by stage manufacturing cycle, the company now fully produces all the necessary parts of the IMI Galil rifle. The company produces the ARM (assault rifle and machine gun).

== See also ==
- COTECMAR
