= Vincenzo Bernardelli S.p.A. (firearms) =

Italian firearms manufacturing company

Vincenzo Bernardelli S.p.A. (also referred to as Bernardelli) was an Italian firearms manufacturing company, founded in 1721 by Vincenzo Bernardelli.

== History ==
=== Foundation ===
The origins of the Bernadelli family's involvement in the firearms business can be traced to 1631, when Bernadelli forebear Bartolino Barnelli married into the noble Acquisti family which owned several gun factories in Gardone Val Trompia at Brescia, Italy. In the following year, Bartolino's sister would marry his wife's brother to further seal the tie between the two families. Sometime between 1632 and 1721, the Barnelli family name changed to Bernardelli. In 1721, some Bernardelli brothers are recorded to have bought a large gun factory in Gardone Val Trompia.

The proper genesis of the gun company that would bear his namesake, would begin with Vincenzo Bernardelli (birthdate unknown). Vincenzo Bernardelli learned gun-making as an employee of the Franzini Arms Factory, that at the time, was one of the most important firearms manufacturers in Gardone Val Trompia. Working in company, Bernardelli would eventually become chief of the Damascus twist shotgun barrel division.

In 1865, Vincenzo Bernardelli would branch out from the Franzini Arms Factory and would start his own firearms business. He founded a large factory with water-powered machinery, which served as the institution to his firearm company. The Bernardelli company utilized water to power its machinery right up to the end of the 20th century.

As at Franzini Arms Factory, Vincenzo Bernardelli originally made Damascus twist shotgun barrels. In the following decade, he would start making complete firearms in limited numbers. He would be joined by his four sons, whom each were assigned a particular role in manufacturing process. The firm soon outgrew its original quarters and began a search for better facilities and room for expansion. In 1899 Vincenzo Bernardelli died and the management was taken over completely by his capable sons.

=== 20th Century ===
In 1908 a large textile factory became available for purchase and was secured by the brothers. Following World War I the factory was modernized yet again.

The company entered commercial sporting arms market in 1928 proper. From 1928 to 1933, the company was one of many Italian firearm companies that manufactured the 10.4mm Italian service revolver, the Bodeo Model 1889. This was the first handgun their company produced, with a total production in excess of 25,000.

During World War II the company began manufacturing artillery fuses, which the company would produce up until 1986.

Following World War II the plant was again expanded and newer machinery and manufacturing methods were installed. The company started to offer differing types of firearms in their line-up, from automatic pistols and automatic rifles. Their first self-loading pistol was the VP (Vest Pocket) Model, which was based on the Walther Model 9.

In 1980s, Bernardelli acquired license to manufacture quantities of the IMI Galil assault rifle in two different models for governmental use. Their domestically produced rifles, including a special variant able to accept NATO STANAG magazines, were entered to the 1988/1989 rifle trials conducted by Italian Armed Forces in search for a Beretta BM59 replacement. Ultimately, the Beretta AR70/90 would be chosen as Army's new standard assault rifle.

=== Closure ===
In 1997 the V. Bernardelli company was forced into bankruptcy and its assets, brands, and trademarks were acquired by the Turkish Sarsılmaz Arms.

== Firearm Products ==
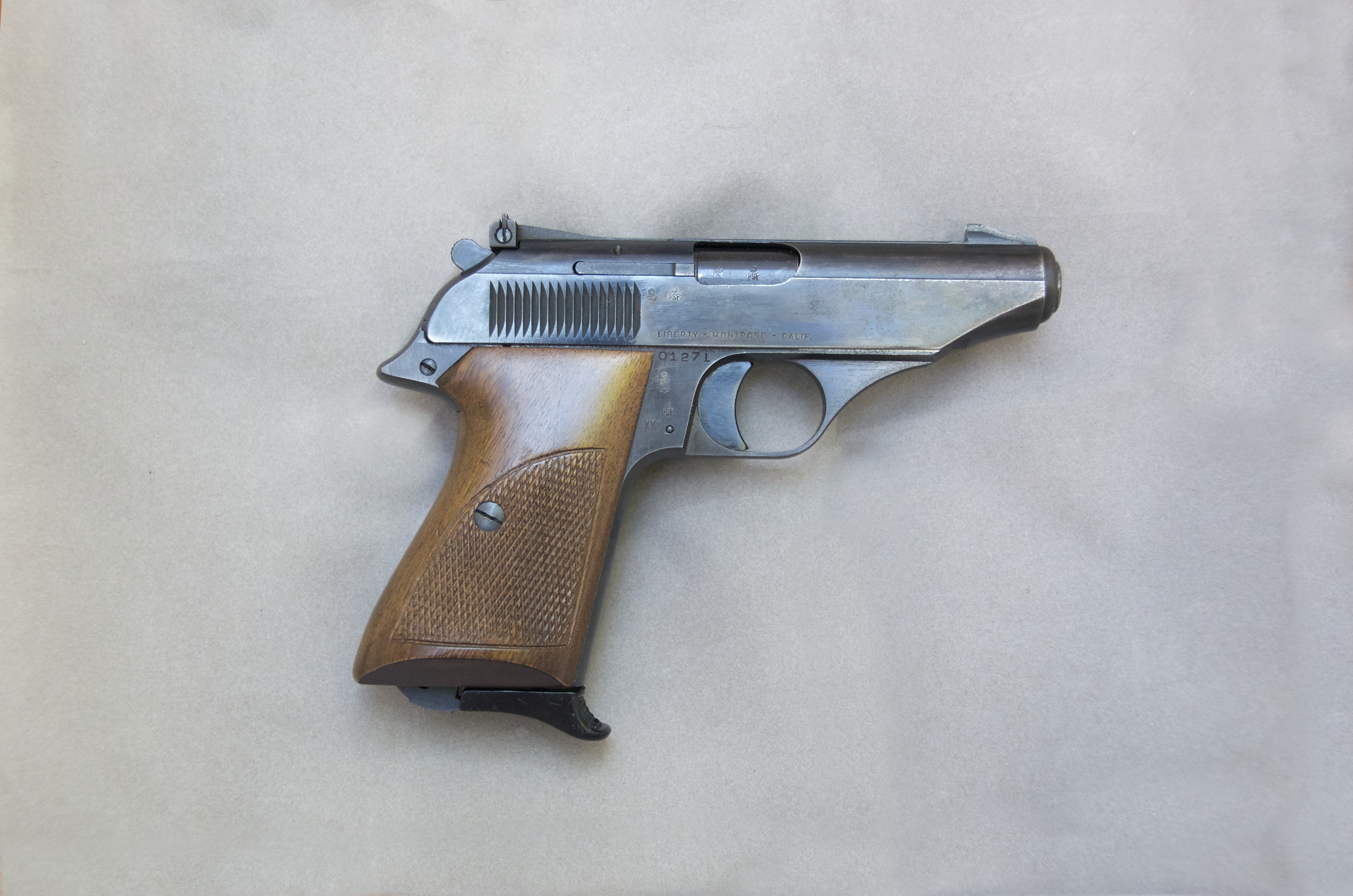
Bernardelli Model 80 .380 ACP semi-automatic pistol.

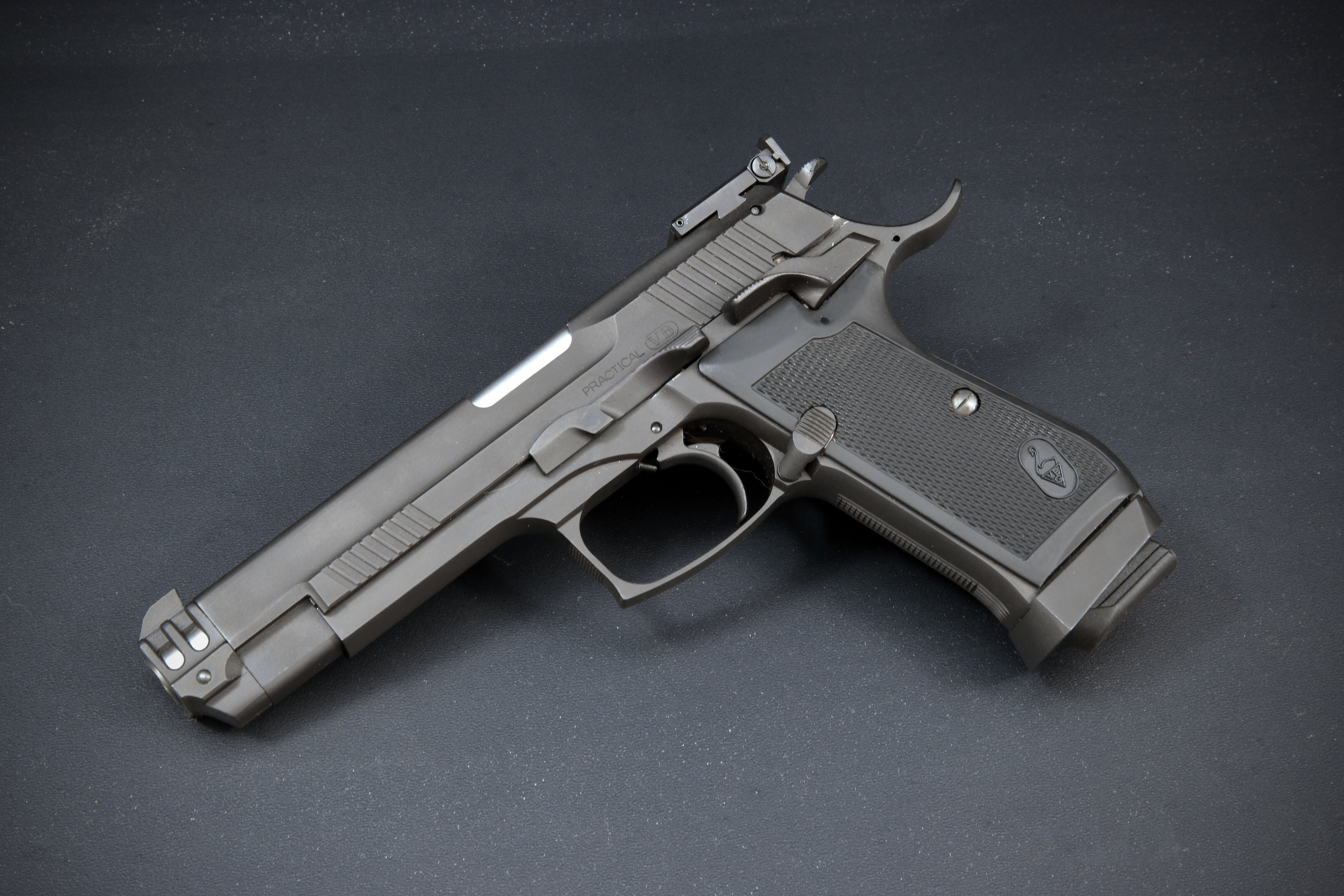
Bernardelli VB Practical 9x19mm.

=== Shotguns ===
- Model 115 Series
- Model 190 Series
- Orione series
- Brescia
- Italia
- Italia Extra
- S. Uberto series
- Roma Series
- Elio
- Elio E
- Hemingway
- Hemingway Deluxe
- Las Palomas Pigeon Model
- Holland V.B. series
- Luck
- Giardino/Garden Gun (9mm Rimfire)

=== Handguns ===
- Vest Pocket Model
- Pocket Model
- Baby Model
- Sporter Model
- Revolvers
- Model 60
- Model 68
- Model 80
- Model 90
- Model AMR
- Model 69
- Model PO10
- Model PO18
- Model PO18 Compact
- Model P. One
- Model P. One-Compact
- Practical VB Target
- Practical VB Custom
- Practical VB Elite
- Model USA

=== Rifles ===
- Carbina VB Target
- Comb 2000
- Express 2000
- Express VB
- Express VB Deluxe
- Minerva
- Mod.377 VB-STD – assault rifle, licensed clone of the Galil AR/ARM variant.
- Mod.378 VB-SR – assault carbine, a modified clone of the Galil SAR with a different magazine well that accepted STANAG magazines.

== Other Products ==
Besides firearms manufacture, Bernardelli has also manufactured components for Alfa Romeo aircraft engines in the late 1920s.

== Legacy ==
In season one of the American television series The X-Files, FBI Special Agent Dana Scully (Gillian Anderson) carries a Bernardelli Model 60 chambered in .32 ACP as her main sidearm.

In the Trigun manga series and its 1998 anime adaptation, the Bernardelli Insurance Society is a reference to Bernardelli firearms.
