= Brescia Arsenal =

Former arms manufacturing facility in Italy

The Brescia Arsenal was a small arms factory located in Brescia, Italy, active from the early 19th century to the end of World War II.
It was originally built as a convent for Servite monks in the 15th century, and continued to be used for religious purposes until the end of the 18th century.

Following Napoleonic suppressions the convent was turned into barracks and, in 1812, the production of small arms and ammunition was started. Many kinds of small arms in use by the Regio Esercito were overhauled in the Brescia Arsenal, including the Vetterli rifle and the many versions of the Carcano rifle. Thousands of Carcano rifles were manufactured on assembly lines, including all the M91 Cavalry Carbines and the M91 TS (Special Troops) carbines made between 1893 and 1919.

The Brescia Arsenal was formally closed down around 1922, returning the former convent buildings to barracks use, while its production facilities in Gardone Val Trompia were kept functional as a separate section of the main Terni Arsenal.

The military facility was attacked by a massive USAAF air raid on 2 March 1945, during World War II, that wrought damage all over the city. The former Arsenal was leveled and the church of St. Afra (now rebuilt as Saint Angela Merici) in "Via dell'Arsenale" (now via Francesco Crispi) was directly hit and collapsed, killing 21 people who had sought refuge there. Eighty people were killed by the bombing.

After the war the building was named after Sottotenente Serafino Gnutti, an Alpini officer who had earned a posthumous Gold Medal of Military Valor in the Greco-Italian War. The Headquarters and Signals section of the "Brescia" mechanised brigade were accommodated there.

Following the post-Cold War reorganization of the Italian Army, the Brigata was disbanded and the barracks were left empty. As of 2024 there were plans to redevelop them into residential apartments.
